= 2014 Indian general election in Bihar =

- 10, 17, 24, 30 April, 7 and 12 May 2014.

All 40 constituencies from Bihar to the Lok Sabha
- Turnout: 56.28%(▲11.81%)
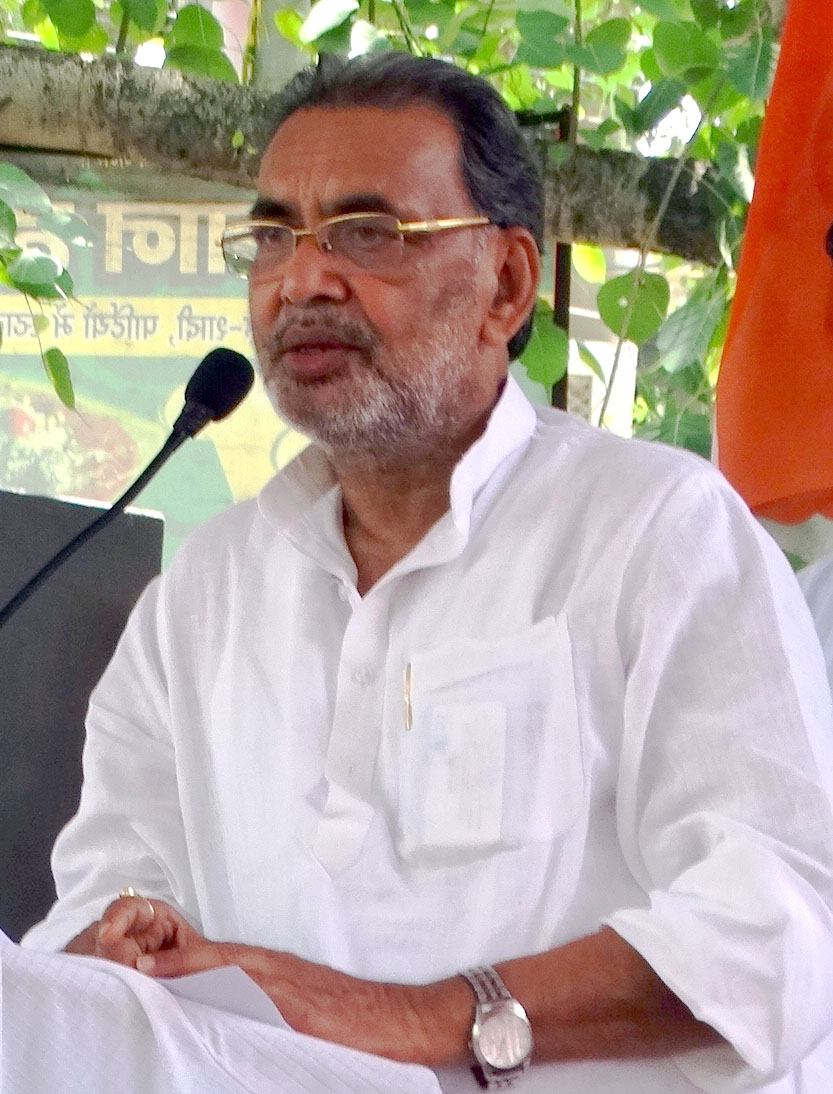

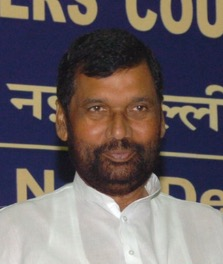

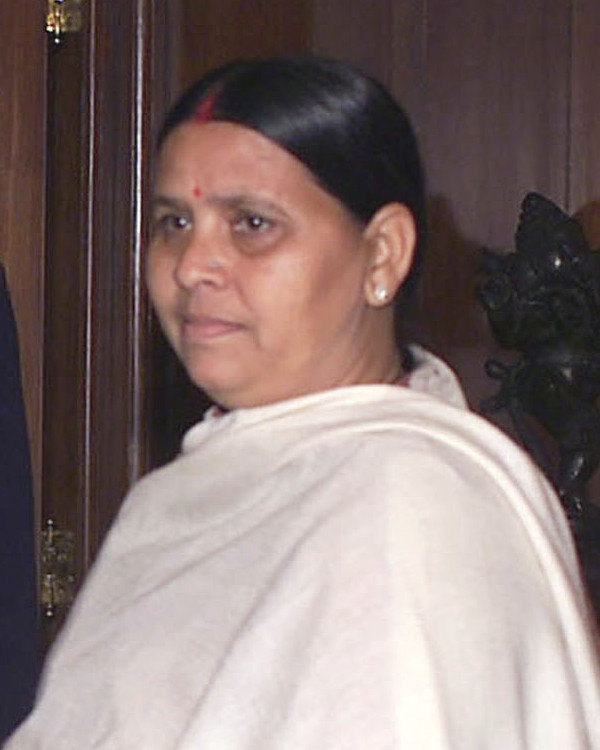

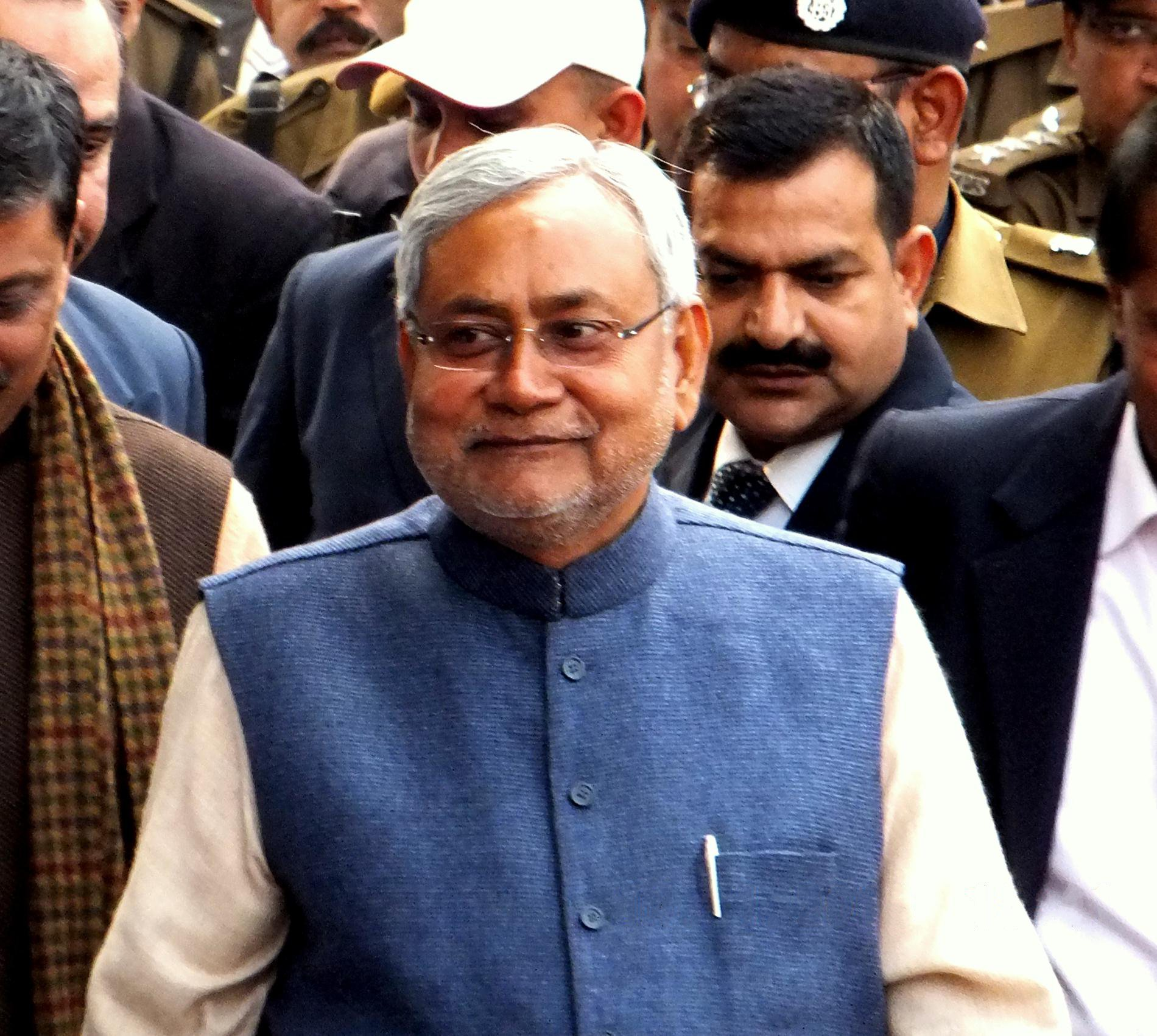
	Majority party	Minority party	Third party
Leader	Radha Mohan Singh	Ram Vilas Paswan	Rabri Devi
Party	BJP	LJP	RJD
Alliance	NDA	NDA	UPA
Leader's seat	Purvi Champaran (won)	Hajipur (won)	Saran (lost)
Last election	12	0	4
Seats won	22	6	4
Seat change	▲10	▲6	Steady
Percentage	29.87%	6.39%	20.46%
Swing	▲15.94%	N/A	▲1.16%
	Fourth party
		INC
Leader	Nitish Kumar
Party	JDU
Alliance		United Progressive Alliance (India)
Leader's seat		'
Last election	0	2
Seats won	2	0
Prime Minister before election
Manmohan Singh
INC
Prime Minister after election
Narendra Modi
BJP

The 2014 Indian general election in Bihar was held in six phases on 10, 17, 24, 30 April, 7 and 12 May 2014.

== Parties and alliances ==
=== National Democratic Alliance ===
Seat sharing agreement between NDA in Bihar Lok Sabha

National Democratic Alliance
Party	Flag	Symbol	Leader	Seats
Bharatiya Janata Party			Radha Mohan Singh	30
Lok Janshakti Party			Ram Vilas Paswan	7
Rashtriya Lok Samata Party			Upendra Kushwaha	3
Total				40

=== United Progressive Alliance ===
Seat sharing between UPA in 2014 Bihar Lok Sabha

United Progressive Alliance
Party	Flag	Symbol	Leader	Seats
Rashtriya Janata Dal			Rabri Devi	27
Indian National Congress			Ashok Chaudhary	12
Nationalist Congress Party			Tariq Anwar	1
Total				40

=== Janata Dal (United) + Communist Party of India ===
JD(U) + CPI
Party	Flag	Symbol	Leader	Seats
Janata Dal (United)			Nitish Kumar	38
Communist Party of India				2
Total				40

== Candidates ==
Constituency		NDA		UPA		JD(U) + CPI	
#	Name	Party	Candidate	Party	Candidate	Party	Candidate
1	Valmiki Nagar	BJP	Satish Chandra Dubey	INC	Purnmasi Ram	JD(U)	Baidyanath Mahto
2	Paschim Champaran	BJP	Sanjay Jaiswal	RJD	Raghunath Jha	JD(U)	Prakash Jha
3	Purvi Champaran	BJP	Radha Mohan Singh	RJD	Vinod Srivastava	JD(U)	Avaneesh Kumar Singh
4	Sheohar	BJP	Rama Devi	RJD	Md Anwarul Haque	JD(U)	Shahid Ali Khan
5	Sitamarhi	RLSP	Ram Kumar Sharma	RJD	Sitaram Yadav	JD(U)	Arjun Ray
6	Madhubani	BJP	Hukmdev Narayan Yadav	RJD	Abdul Bari Siddiqui	JD(U)	Prof. Ghulam Ghous
7	Jhanjharpur	BJP	Birendra Chaudhary	RJD	Mangani Lal Mandal	JD(U)	Devendra Prasad Yadav
8	Supaul	BJP	Kameshwar Chaupal	INC	Ranjeet Ranjan	JD(U)	Dileshwar Kamait
9	Araria	BJP	Pradeep Kumar Singh	RJD	Sarfaraz Alam	JD(U)	Vijay Kumar Mandal
10	Kishanganj	BJP	Dilip Jaiswal	INC	Asrarul Haq Qasmi	JD(U)	Akhtarul Iman
11	Katihar	BJP	Nikhil Kumar Choudhary	NCP	Tariq Anwar	JD(U)	Ram Prakash Mahto
12	Purnia	BJP	Uday Singh	INC	Amarnath Tiwari	JD(U)	Santosh Kushwaha
13	Madhepura	BJP	Vijay Kumar Singh	RJD	Pappu Yadav	JD(U)	Sharad Yadav
14	Darbhanga	BJP	Kirti Azad	RJD	Md. Ali Ashraf Fatmi	JD(U)	Sanjay Kumar Jha
15	Muzaffarpur	BJP	Ajay Nishad	INC	Akhilesh Prasad Singh	JD(U)	Bijendra Chaudhary
16	Vaishali	LJP	Rama Kishore Singh	RJD	Raghuvansh Singh	JD(U)	Vijay Kumar Sahni
17	Gopalganj (SC)	BJP	Janak Ram	INC	Jyoti Bharti	JD(U)	Anil Kumar
18	Siwan	BJP	Om Prakash Yadav	RJD	Hena Shahab	JD(U)	Manoj Kumar Singh
19	Maharajganj	BJP	Janardan Singh Sigriwal	RJD	Prabhunath Singh	JD(U)	Manoranjan Singh
20	Saran	BJP	Rajiv Pratap Rudy	RJD	Rabri Devi	JD(U)	Saleem Perwez
21	Hajipur (SC)	LJP	Ram Vilas Paswan	INC	Sanjeev Prasad Toni	JD(U)	Ram Sundar Das
22	Ujiarpur	BJP	Nityanand Rai	RJD	Alok Mehta	JD(U)	Ashwamedh Devi
23	Samastipur (SC)	LJP	Ram Chandra Paswan	INC	Ashok Kumar	JD(U)	Maheshwar Hazari
24	Begusarai	BJP	Bhola Singh	RJD	Tanveer Hasan	CPI	Rajendra Prasad Singh
25	Khagaria	LJP	Mehboob Ali Kaiser	RJD	Krishna Kumari Yadav	JD(U)	Dinesh Chandra Yadav
26	Bhagalpur	BJP	Shahnawaz Hussain	RJD	Shailesh Mandal	JD(U)	Abu Qaiser
27	Banka	BJP	Putul Kumari	RJD	Jay Prakash Yadav	CPI	Sanjay Kumar
28	Munger	LJP	Veena Devi	RJD	Pragati Mehta	JD(U)	Lalan Singh
29	Nalanda	LJP	Satyanand Sharma	INC	Ashish Ranjan Sinha	JD(U)	Kaushalendra Kumar
30	Patna Sahib	BJP	Shatrughan Sinha	INC	Kunal Singh	JD(U)	Dr. Gopal Prasad Sinha
31	Pataliputra	BJP	Ram Kripal Yadav	RJD	Misa Bharti	JD(U)	Ranjan Prasad Yadav
32	Arrah	BJP	R. K. Singh	RJD	Bhagwan Kushwaha	JD(U)	Meena Singh
33	Buxar	BJP	Ashwini Kumar Choubey	RJD	Jagada Nand Singh	JD(U)	Shyam Lal Kushwaha
34	Sasaram (SC)	BJP	Chhedi Paswan	INC	Meira Kumar	JD(U)	K.P. Ramaiah
35	Karakat	RLSP	Upendra Kushwaha	RJD	Kanti Singh	JD(U)	Mahabali Singh
36	Jahanabad	RLSP	Arun Kumar	RJD	Surendra Prasad Yadav	JD(U)	Anil Kumar Sharma
37	Aurangabad	BJP	Sushil Kumar Singh	INC	Nikhil Kumar	JD(U)	Bagi Kumar Verma
38	Gaya (SC)	BJP	Hari Manjhi	RJD	Ramji Manjhi	JD(U)	Jitan Ram Manjhi
39	Nawada	BJP	Giriraj Singh	RJD	Raj Ballabh Yadav	JD(U)	Kaushal Yadav
40	Jamui (SC)	LJP	Chirag Paswan	RJD	Sudhansu S. Bhaskar	JD(U)	Uday Choudhary

== Results ==
22	6	3	2	4	1	2
BJP	LJP	RLSP	JDU	RJD	NCP	INC

=== Results by Alliance or Party ===
Alliance/ Party		Popular vote			Seats		
Alliance/ Party		Votes	%	±pp	Contested	Won	+/−
NDA	BJP	1,05,43,025	29.38		30	22	▲10
NDA	LJP	22,95,929	6.40		7	6	▲7
NDA	RLSP	10,72,804	2.99		3	3	▲3
NDA	Total	1,39,11,758	38.77		40	31	
UPA	RJD	72,24,893	20.13		27	4	Steady
UPA	INC	30,21,065	8.42		12	2	Steady
UPA	NCP	4,31,292	1.20	Steady	1	1	▲1
UPA	Total	1,06,77,250	29.75		40	7	
JD(U)+	JD(U)	56,62,444	15.78		38	2	
JD(U)+	CPI	4,13,347	1.15		2	0	
JD(U)+	Total	60,75,791	16.93	Steady	40	2	Steady
BSP		7,65,758	2.13		40	0	
CPI(M-L)L		4,63,045	1.29		23	0	
AAP		3,38,637	0.94		39	0	
JMM		1,89,265	0.53		8	0	
SHS		1,47,906	0.41		7	0	
CPI(M)		1,06,297	0.30		4	0	
SP		98,331	0.27		12	0	
Others		9,91,397	2.76	Steady	184	0	Steady
IND		15,33,264	4.27	Steady	169	0	Steady
NOTA		5,80,964	1.62	Steady			
Total		3,58,85,332	100%	Steady	606	40	Steady

=== Constituency-wise results ===
Constituency		Winner				Runner Up				Margin	%
#	Name	Candidate	Party	Votes	%	Candidate	Party	Votes	%	Margin	%
1	Valmiki Nagar	Satish Chandra Dubey	BJP	364,013	40.44	Purnmasi Ram	INC	246,218	27.35	117,795	13.09
2	Paschim Champaran	Sanjay Jaiswal	BJP	371,232	43.43	Prakash Jha	JD(U)	260,978	30.53	110,254	12.90
3	Purvi Champaran	Radha Mohan Singh	BJP	400,452	48.68	Binod Kumar Srivastava	RJD	208,289	25.32	192,163	23.36
4	Sheohar	Rama Devi	BJP	372,506	44.19	Anwarul Haque	RJD	236,267	28.03	136,239	16.16
5	Sitamarhi	Ram Kumar Sharma	RLSP	411,265	45.67	Sitaram Yadav	RJD	263,300	29.24	147,965	16.43
6	Madhubani	Hukmdev Narayan Yadav	BJP	358,040	41.61	Abdul Bari Siddiqui	RJD	337,505	39.22	20,535	2.39
7	Jhanjharpur	Birendra Chaudhary	BJP	335,481	35.64	Mangani Lal Mandal	RJD	280,073	29.75	55,408	5.89
8	Supaul	Ranjeet Ranjan	INC	332,927	34.30	Dileshwar Kamait	JD(U)	273,255	28.15	59,672	6.15
9	Araria	Taslimuddin	RJD	407,978	41.81	Pradeep Singh	BJP	261,474	26.80	146,504	15.01
10	Kishanganj	Asrarul Haq Qasmi	INC	493,461	53.15	Dilip Jaiswal	BJP	298,849	32.19	194,612	20.96
11	Katihar	Tariq Anwar	NCP	431,292	44.11	Nikhil Choudhary	BJP	316,552	32.37	114,740	11.74
12	Purnia	Santosh Kushwaha	JD(U)	418,826	41.15	Uday Singh	BJP	302,157	29.69	116,669	11.46
13	Madhepura	Pappu Yadav	RJD	368,937	35.65	Sharad Yadav	JD(U)	312,728	30.22	56,209	5.43
14	Darbhanga	Kirti Azad	BJP	314,949	37.98	Ali Ashraf Fatmi	RJD	279,906	33.75	35,043	4.23
15	Muzaffarpur	Ajay Nishad	BJP	469,295	49.46	Akhilesh Prasad Singh	INC	246,873	26.02	222,422	23.44
16	Vaishali	Rama Kishore Singh	LJP	305,450	32.99	Raghuvansh Prasad Singh	RJD	206,183	22.27	99,267	10.72
17	Gopalganj (SC)	Janak Ram	BJP	478,773	52.99	Jyoti Bharti	INC	191,837	21.23	286,936	31.76
18	Siwan	Om Prakash Yadav	BJP	372,670	42.16	Hena Shahab	RJD	258,823	29.28	113,847	12.88
19	Maharajganj	Janardan Singh Sigriwal	BJP	320,753	37.88	Prabhunath Singh	RJD	282,338	33.34	38,415	4.54
20	Saran	Rajiv Pratap Rudy	BJP	355,120	41.12	Rabri Devi	RJD	314,172	36.38	40,948	4.74
21	Hajipur (SC)	Ram Vilas Paswan	LJP	455,652	50.31	Sanjeev Prasad Toni	INC	230,152	25.41	225,500	24.90
22	Ujiarpur	Nityanand Rai	BJP	317,352	36.95	Alok Mehta	RJD	256,883	29.91	60,469	7.04
23	Samastipur (SC)	Ram Chandra Paswan	LJP	270,401	31.33	Ashok Kumar	INC	263,529	30.53	6,872	0.80
24	Begusarai	Bhola Singh	BJP	428,227	39.72	Md. Tanveer Hassan	RJD	369,892	34.31	58,335	5.41
25	Khagaria	Mehboob Ali Kaiser	LJP	313,806	35.01	Krishna Kumari Yadav	RJD	237,803	26.53	76,003	8.48
26	Bhagalpur	Shailesh Mandal	RJD	367,623	37.74	Shahnawaz Hussain	BJP	358,138	36.76	9,485	0.98
27	Banka	Jay Prakash Narayan Yadav	RJD	285,150	31.71	Putul Kumari	BJP	275,006	30.58	10,144	1.13
28	Munger	Veena Devi	LJP	352,911	38.59	Lalan Singh	JD(U)	243,827	26.66	109,084	11.93
29	Nalanda	Kaushalendra Kumar	JD(U)	321,982	34.93	Satya Nand Sharma	LJP	312,355	33.88	9,627	1.05
30	Patna Sahib	Shatrughan Sinha	BJP	485,905	55.04	Kunal Singh	INC	220,100	24.93	265,805	30.11
31	Pataliputra	Ram Kripal Yadav	BJP	383,262	39.16	Misa Bharti	RJD	342,940	35.04	40,322	4.12
32	Arrah	R. K. Singh	BJP	391,074	43.78	Bhagwan Singh Kushwaha	RJD	255,204	28.57	135,870	15.21
33	Buxar	Ashwini Choubey	BJP	319,012	35.88	Jagada Nand Singh	RJD	186,674	20.99	132,338	14.89
34	Sasaram (SC)	Chhedi Paswan	BJP	366,087	43.19	Meira Kumar	INC	302,760	35.72	63,327	7.47
35	Karakat	Upendra Kushwaha	RLSP	338,892	42.88	Kanti Singh	RJD	233,651	29.56	105,241	13.32
36	Jahanabad	Arun Kumar	RLSP	322,647	39.74	Surendra Prasad Yadav	RJD	280,307	34.53	42,340	5.21
37	Aurangabad	Sushil Singh	BJP	307,941	39.16	Nikhil Kumar	INC	241,594	30.72	66,347	8.44
38	Gaya (SC)	Hari Manjhi	BJP	326,230	40.30	Ramji Manjhi	RJD	210,726	26.03	115,504	14.27
39	Nawada	Giriraj Singh	BJP	390,248	44.12	Raj Ballabh Yadav	RJD	250,091	28.28	140,157	15.84
40	Jamui (SC)	Chirag Paswan	LJP	285,354	36.79	Sudhansu Shekhar Bhaskar	RJD	199,407	25.71	85,947	11.08

== Post-election Union Council of Ministers from Bihar ==
#	Name	Constituency	Designation	Department	From	To	Party
1	Ravi Shankar Prasad	Rajya Sabha (Bihar)	Cabinet Minister	Law and Justice	27 May 2014	9 Nov 2014	BJP
1	Ravi Shankar Prasad	Rajya Sabha (Bihar)	Cabinet Minister	Communications and Information Technology	27 May 2014	5 July 2016	BJP
1	Ravi Shankar Prasad	Rajya Sabha (Bihar)	Cabinet Minister	Electronics and Information Technology	5 July 2016	30 May 2019	BJP
1	Ravi Shankar Prasad	Rajya Sabha (Bihar)	Cabinet Minister	Law and Justice	5 July 2016	30 May 2019	BJP
2	Radha Mohan Singh	Purvi Champaran	Cabinet Minister	Agriculture and Farmers' Welfare	27 May 2014	30 May 2019	BJP
3	Dharmendra Pradhan	Rajya Sabha (Bihar)	MoS (I/C)	Petroleum and Natural Gas	27 May 2014	3 Sept 2017	BJP
3	Dharmendra Pradhan	Rajya Sabha (Bihar)	Cabinet Minister	Petroleum and Natural Gas	3 Sept 2017	30 May 2019	BJP
3	Dharmendra Pradhan	Rajya Sabha (Bihar)	Cabinet Minister	Skill Development and Entrepreneurship	3 Sept 2017	30 May 2019	BJP
4	Rajiv Pratap Rudy	Saran	MoS (I/C)	Skill Development and Entrepreneurship	9 Nov 2014	3 Sept 2017	BJP
4	Rajiv Pratap Rudy	Saran	MoS	Parliamentary Affairs	9 Nov 2014	5 July 2016	BJP
5	Giriraj Singh	Nawada	MoS	Micro, Small and Medium Enterprises	9 Nov 2014	3 Sept 2017	BJP
5	Giriraj Singh	Nawada	MoS (I/C)	Micro, Small and Medium Enterprises	3 Sept 2017	30 May 2019	BJP
6	Ram Kripal Yadav	Pataliputra	MoS	Drinking Water and Sanitation	9 Nov 2014	5 July 2016	BJP
6	Ram Kripal Yadav	Pataliputra	MoS	Rural Development	5 July 2016	30 May 2019	BJP
7	Raj Kumar Singh	Arrah	MoS (I/C)	Power; New and Renewable Energy	3 Sept 2017	30 May 2019	BJP
8	Ashwini Kumar Choubey	Buxar	MoS	Health and Family Welfare	3 Sept 2017	30 May 2019	BJP
9	Ram Vilas Paswan	Hajipur (SC)	Cabinet Minister	Consumer Affairs, Food and Public Distribution	27 May 2014	30 May 2019	LJP
10	Upendra Kushwaha	Karakat	MoS	Rural Development; Panchayati Raj; Drinking Water and Sanitation	27 May 2014	9 Nov 2014	RLSP
10	Upendra Kushwaha	Karakat	MoS	Human Resource Development	9 Nov 2014	11 Dec 2018	RLSP

- Note: Dharmendra Pradhan represented Bihar in the Rajya Sabha until 3 April 2018, after which he represented Madhya Pradesh

== Assembly segments wise lead of Parties ==
2014 Bihar Lok Sabha Elections Assembly Wise Leads Map

Party		Assembly segments
NDA	BJP	123
NDA	LJP	33
NDA	RLSP	17
NDA	Total	173
UPA	RJD	33
UPA	INC	14
UPA	NCP	5
UPA	Total	52
Others	JD(U)	17
Others	CPI	1
Others	Total	18
Total		243

=== Constituency Wise ===
Lok Sabha		Constituency		Winner		Runner-up		2nd Runner-up		Margin
#	Name	#	Name	Party	Votes	Party	Votes	Party	Votes	Margin
1	Valmiki Nagar	1	Valmiki Nagar	BJP	76,708	INC	33,543	JD(U)	14,949	43,165
1	Valmiki Nagar	2	Ramnagar (SC)	BJP	67,172	INC	44,883	IND	13,895	22,289
1	Valmiki Nagar	3	Narkatiaganj	INC	50,970	BJP	38,753	IND	24,882	12,217
1	Valmiki Nagar	4	Bagaha	BJP	72,408	INC	41,608	JD(U)	15,078	30,800
1	Valmiki Nagar	5	Lauriya	BJP	57,530	INC	30,683	JD(U)	16,636	26,847
1	Valmiki Nagar	9	Sikta	BJP	51,287	INC	44,429	JD(U)	17,774	6,858
1	Valmiki Nagar	—	Postal Ballot	BJP	153	INC	102	JD(U)	19	51
2	Paschim Champaran	6	Nautan	BJP	60,623	JD(U)	48,768	RJD	10,038	11,855
2	Paschim Champaran	7	Chanpatia	JD(U)	65,036	BJP	58,066	RJD	6,531	6,970
2	Paschim Champaran	8	Bettiah	BJP	60,206	JD(U)	58,938	RJD	7,261	1,268
2	Paschim Champaran	10	Raxaul	BJP	65,956	JD(U)	34,072	RJD	29,106	31,884
2	Paschim Champaran	11	Sugauli	BJP	66,115	JD(U)	36,208	RJD	23,261	29,907
2	Paschim Champaran	12	Narkatia	BJP	60,172	RJD	45,590	JD(U)	17,913	14,582
2	Paschim Champaran	—	Postal Ballot	BJP	94	JD(U)	43	RJD	13	51
3	Purvi Champaran	13	Harsidhi (SC)	BJP	57,758	RJD	39,004	JD(U)	22,980	18,754
3	Purvi Champaran	14	Govindganj	BJP	61,709	JD(U)	24,789	RJD	21,966	36,920
3	Purvi Champaran	15	Kesaria	BJP	55,636	RJD	27,239	JD(U)	20,869	28,397
3	Purvi Champaran	16	Kalyanpur	BJP	57,133	RJD	31,358	JD(U)	20,615	25,775
3	Purvi Champaran	17	Pipra	BJP	78,882	RJD	45,166	JD(U)	22,499	33,716
3	Purvi Champaran	19	Motihari	BJP	89,317	RJD	43,550	JD(U)	16,852	45,767
3	Purvi Champaran	—	Postal Ballot	BJP	17	RJD	6	JD(U)	0	11
4	Sheohar	18	Madhuban	BJP	61,177	RJD	23,840	JD(U)	13,763	37,337
4	Sheohar	20	Chiraia	BJP	54,256	RJD	40,411	JD(U)	16,009	13,845
4	Sheohar	21	Dhaka	BJP	65,787	RJD	64,224	JD(U)	11,994	1,563
4	Sheohar	22	Sheohar	BJP	62,386	RJD	35,551	JD(U)	14,703	26,835
4	Sheohar	23	Riga	BJP	75,175	RJD	39,074	JD(U)	14,751	36,101
4	Sheohar	30	Belsand	BJP	53,607	RJD	33,080	JD(U)	7,879	20,527
4	Sheohar	—	Postal Ballot	BJP	118	RJD	87	JD(U)	9	31
5	Sitamarhi	24	Bathnaha (SC)	RLSP	82,004	RJD	35,552	JD(U)	14,312	46,452
5	Sitamarhi	25	Parihar	RLSP	72,866	RJD	49,921	JD(U)	15,195	22,945
5	Sitamarhi	26	Sursand	RLSP	63,674	RJD	48,235	JD(U)	20,785	15,439
5	Sitamarhi	27	Bajpatti	RLSP	59,589	RJD	51,216	JD(U)	17,592	8,373
5	Sitamarhi	28	Sitamarhi	RLSP	73,968	RJD	44,363	JD(U)	15,188	29,605
5	Sitamarhi	29	Runnisaidpur	RLSP	59,121	RJD	33,964	JD(U)	14,110	25,157
5	Sitamarhi	—	Postal Ballot	RJD	49	RLSP	43	JD(U)	6	6
6	Madhubani	31	Harlakhi	BJP	53,991	RJD	43,324	JD(U)	18,967	10,667
6	Madhubani	32	Benipatti	BJP	55,436	RJD	44,586	JD(U)	10,095	10,850
6	Madhubani	35	Bisfi	RJD	67,239	BJP	56,523	JD(U)	10,164	10,716
6	Madhubani	36	Madhubani	BJP	73,170	RJD	64,762	JD(U)	6,283	8,408
6	Madhubani	86	Keoti	RJD	61,791	BJP	55,489	JD(U)	4,953	6,302
6	Madhubani	87	Jale	BJP	63,380	RJD	55,757	JD(U)	5,926	7,623
6	Madhubani	—	Postal Ballot	BJP	51	RJD	46	JD(U)	4	5
7	Jhanjharpur	33	Khajauli	BJP	58,473	RJD	52,611	JD(U)	24,216	5,862
7	Jhanjharpur	34	Babubarhi	BJP	55,757	RJD	45,152	JD(U)	35,679	10,605
7	Jhanjharpur	37	Rajnagar (SC)	BJP	62,945	RJD	43,928	JD(U)	15,828	19,017
7	Jhanjharpur	38	Jhanjharpur	BJP	65,528	RJD	40,579	JD(U)	20,479	24,949
7	Jhanjharpur	39	Phulparas	RJD	48,626	BJP	48,382	JD(U)	35,399	244
7	Jhanjharpur	40	Laukaha	JD(U)	51,974	RJD	49,128	BJP	44,355	2,846
7	Jhanjharpur	—	Postal Ballot	RJD	49	BJP	41	JD(U)	16	8
8	Supaul	41	Nirmali	JD(U)	49,021	BJP	48,322	INC	45,792	699
8	Supaul	42	Pipra	JD(U)	53,481	INC	49,756	BJP	40,016	3,725
8	Supaul	43	Supaul	INC	52,088	JD(U)	45,661	BJP	36,370	6,427
8	Supaul	44	Triveniganj (SC)	INC	63,453	JD(U)	46,172	BJP	33,949	17,281
8	Supaul	45	Chhatapur	BJP	58,135	INC	51,535	JD(U)	35,483	6,600
8	Supaul	72	Singheshwar (SC)	INC	70,301	JD(U)	43,437	BJP	32,895	26,864
8	Supaul	—	Postal Ballot	BJP	6	INC	2	JD(U)	0	4
9	Araria	46	Narpatganj	RJD	61,044	BJP	50,839	JD(U)	39,807	10,205
9	Araria	47	Raniganj (SC)	RJD	59,227	BJP	40,488	JD(U)	40,481	18,739
9	Araria	48	Forbesganj	BJP	64,771	RJD	60,978	JD(U)	42,017	3,793
9	Araria	49	Araria	RJD	88,106	BJP	38,147	JD(U)	23,589	49,959
9	Araria	50	Jokihat	RJD	92,575	BJP	29,436	JD(U)	16,836	63,139
9	Araria	51	Sikti	JD(U)	59,039	RJD	46,045	BJP	37,789	12,994
9	Araria	—	Postal Ballot	BJP	4	RJD	3	JD(U)	0	1
10	Kishanganj	52	Bahadurganj	INC	84,710	BJP	48,140	JD(U)	3,999	36,570
10	Kishanganj	53	Thakurganj	INC	85,395	BJP	66,545	JD(U)	4,906	18,850
10	Kishanganj	54	Kishanganj	INC	84,488	BJP	63,552	JD(U)	3,355	20,936
10	Kishanganj	55	Kochadhaman	INC	67,406	BJP	35,218	JD(U)	14,791	32,188
10	Kishanganj	56	Amour	INC	1,03,240	BJP	44,041	JD(U)	4,503	59,199
10	Kishanganj	57	Baisi	INC	68,055	BJP	41,266	JD(U)	24,257	26,789
10	Kishanganj	—	Postal Ballot	INC	167	BJP	87	JD(U)	11	80
11	Katihar	63	Katihar	BJP	59,729	NCP	50,652	JD(U)	24,027	9,077
11	Katihar	64	Kadwa	NCP	65,878	BJP	43,381	JD(U)	22,630	22,497
11	Katihar	65	Balrampur	NCP	1,00,882	BJP	55,389	CPI(ML)	6,829	45,493
11	Katihar	66	Pranpur	NCP	83,643	BJP	60,264	JD(U)	9,437	23,379
11	Katihar	67	Manihari (ST)	NCP	67,177	BJP	54,697	JD(U)	12,141	12,480
11	Katihar	68	Barari	NCP	62,940	BJP	42,955	JD(U)	28,188	19,985
11	Katihar	—	Postal Ballot	BJP	137	NCP	120	JD(U)	24	17
12	Purnia	58	Kasba	JD(U)	82,620	BJP	48,996	INC	12,899	33,624
12	Purnia	59	Banmankhi (SC)	JD(U)	52,265	BJP	43,327	INC	39,101	8,938
12	Purnia	60	Rupauli	JD(U)	68,603	BJP	48,139	INC	18,448	20,464
12	Purnia	61	Dhamdaha	JD(U)	66,714	BJP	49,231	INC	27,256	17,483
12	Purnia	62	Purnia	JD(U)	75,707	BJP	68,977	JMM	9,215	6,730
12	Purnia	69	Korha (SC)	JD(U)	72,808	BJP	43,309	INC	18,130	29,499
12	Purnia	—	Postal Ballot	BJP	178	JD(U)	109	INC	69	69
13	Madhepura	70	Alamnagar	JD(U)	69,141	BJP	49,742	RJD	44,732	19,399
13	Madhepura	71	Bihariganj	RJD	60,887	JD(U)	58,501	BJP	34,612	2,386
13	Madhepura	73	Madhepura	RJD	83,357	JD(U)	53,711	BJP	30,825	29,646
13	Madhepura	74	Sonbarsha (SC)	JD(U)	54,182	RJD	49,028	BJP	35,533	5,154
13	Madhepura	75	Saharsa	RJD	72,311	BJP	68,538	JD(U)	40,235	3,773
13	Madhepura	77	Mahishi	RJD	58,561	JD(U)	36,941	BJP	33,216	21,620
13	Madhepura	—	Postal Ballot	BJP	68	RJD	61	JD(U)	17	7
14	Darbhanga	79	Gaura Bauram	BJP	45,714	RJD	39,048	JD(U)	15,871	6,666
14	Darbhanga	80	Benipur	BJP	47,362	RJD	44,883	JD(U)	25,341	2,479
14	Darbhanga	81	Alinagar	RJD	50,302	BJP	45,031	JD(U)	17,702	5,271
14	Darbhanga	82	Darbhanga Rural	BJP	48,589	RJD	47,476	JD(U)	16,427	1,113
14	Darbhanga	83	Darbhanga	BJP	75,183	RJD	47,366	JD(U)	12,309	27,817
14	Darbhanga	85	Bahadurpur	BJP	53,054	RJD	50,830	JD(U)	16,844	2,224
14	Darbhanga	—	Postal Ballot	BJP	16	RJD	1	JD(U)	0	15
15	Muzaffarpur	88	Gaighat	BJP	76,258	INC	41,404	JD(U)	15,820	34,854
15	Muzaffarpur	89	Aurai	BJP	66,377	INC	48,185	JD(U)	11,944	18,192
15	Muzaffarpur	91	Bochaha (SC)	BJP	83,802	INC	35,223	JD(U)	13,575	48,579
15	Muzaffarpur	92	Sakra (SC)	BJP	71,521	INC	40,074	JD(U)	13,729	31,447
15	Muzaffarpur	93	Kurhani	BJP	76,535	INC	43,945	JD(U)	15,221	32,590
15	Muzaffarpur	94	Muzaffarpur	BJP	94,789	INC	38,038	JD(U)	14,846	56,751
15	Muzaffarpur	—	Postal Ballot	BJP	13	JD(U)	5	INC	4	8
16	Vaishali	90	Minapur	LJP	51,418	RJD	38,222	JD(U)	29,453	13,196
16	Vaishali	95	Kanti	LJP	52,321	RJD	43,666	IND	24,273	8,655
16	Vaishali	96	Baruraj	LJP	41,589	RJD	27,874	JD(U)	24,131	13,715
16	Vaishali	97	Paroo	LJP	52,428	RJD	31,278	JD(U)	22,937	21,150
16	Vaishali	98	Sahebganj	LJP	49,229	RJD	27,015	JD(U)	22,954	22,214
16	Vaishali	125	Vaishali	LJP	58,461	RJD	38,125	JD(U)	25,810	20,336
16	Vaishali	—	Postal Ballot	LJP	4	RJD	3	JD(U)	2	1
17	Gopalganj (SC)	99	Baikunthpur	BJP	79,280	INC	30,665	JD(U)	13,946	48,615
17	Gopalganj (SC)	100	Barauli	BJP	73,513	INC	37,411	JD(U)	11,284	36,102
17	Gopalganj (SC)	101	Gopalganj	BJP	85,644	INC	41,620	JD(U)	12,965	44,024
17	Gopalganj (SC)	102	Kuchaikote	BJP	88,598	INC	28,052	JD(U)	14,143	60,546
17	Gopalganj (SC)	103	Bhorey (SC)	BJP	74,133	JD(U)	30,886	INC	21,884	43,247
17	Gopalganj (SC)	104	Hathua	BJP	77,590	INC	32,200	JD(U)	17,193	45,390
17	Gopalganj (SC)	—	Postal Ballot	BJP	15	INC	5	JD(U)	2	10
18	Siwan	105	Siwan	BJP	80,966	RJD	57,546	JD(U)	7,267	23,420
18	Siwan	106	Ziradei	BJP	48,244	RJD	32,532	CPI(ML)	23,313	15,712
18	Siwan	107	Darauli (SC)	BJP	49,841	CPI(ML)	36,918	RJD	28,970	12,923
18	Siwan	108	Raghunathpur	BJP	53,321	RJD	49,283	JD(U)	13,729	4,038
18	Siwan	109	Daraundha	BJP	66,077	RJD	37,912	JD(U)	19,774	28,165
18	Siwan	110	Barharia	BJP	74,210	RJD	52,575	JD(U)	12,202	21,635
18	Siwan	—	Postal Ballot	BJP	11	RJD	5	JD(U)	0	6
19	Maharajganj	111	Goriakothi	BJP	66,992	RJD	53,538	JD(U)	15,894	13,454
19	Maharajganj	112	Maharajganj	BJP	53,168	RJD	39,370	JD(U)	30,220	13,798
19	Maharajganj	113	Ekma	BJP	50,831	RJD	40,427	JD(U)	30,384	10,404
19	Maharajganj	114	Manjhi	BJP	54,182	RJD	47,688	JD(U)	21,609	6,494
19	Maharajganj	115	Baniapur	RJD	53,413	BJP	51,557	JD(U)	25,685	1,856
19	Maharajganj	116	Taraiya	RJD	47,735	BJP	43,915	JD(U)	25,644	3,820
19	Maharajganj	—	Postal Ballot	RJD	167	BJP	108	JD(U)	47	59
20	Saran	117	Marhaura	BJP	53,870	RJD	47,220	JD(U)	18,298	6,650
20	Saran	118	Chapra	BJP	81,291	RJD	43,035	JD(U)	16,034	38,256
20	Saran	119	Garkha (SC)	RJD	64,097	BJP	63,538	JD(U)	15,297	559
20	Saran	120	Amnour	BJP	52,597	RJD	41,050	JD(U)	19,125	11,547
20	Saran	121	Parsa	RJD	55,764	BJP	42,632	JD(U)	21,147	13,132
20	Saran	122	Sonepur	RJD	62,712	BJP	60,810	JD(U)	17,015	1,902
20	Saran	—	Postal Ballot	BJP	382	RJD	294	JD(U)	92	88
21	Hajipur (SC)	123	Hajipur	LJP	96,736	INC	39,932	JD(U)	12,499	56,804
21	Hajipur (SC)	124	Lalganj	LJP	92,363	INC	32,002	JD(U)	13,496	60,361
21	Hajipur (SC)	126	Mahua	LJP	68,422	INC	40,310	JD(U)	16,395	28,112
21	Hajipur (SC)	127	Raja Pakar (SC)	LJP	63,202	INC	30,271	JD(U)	19,356	32,931
21	Hajipur (SC)	128	Raghopur	LJP	63,786	INC	55,974	JD(U)	14,555	7,812
21	Hajipur (SC)	129	Mahnar	LJP	70,365	INC	31,327	JD(U)	19,400	39,038
21	Hajipur (SC)	—	Postal Ballot	LJP	778	INC	336	JD(U)	89	442
22	Ujiarpur	130	Patepur (SC)	BJP	61,054	RJD	37,465	JD(U)	15,908	23,589
22	Ujiarpur	134	Ujiarpur	BJP	55,570	RJD	51,176	JD(U)	19,427	4,394
22	Ujiarpur	135	Morwa	BJP	54,253	RJD	43,669	JD(U)	19,924	10,584
22	Ujiarpur	136	Sarairanjan	BJP	56,032	RJD	45,539	JD(U)	24,871	10,493
22	Ujiarpur	137	Mohiuddinnagar	BJP	52,291	RJD	43,689	JD(U)	14,085	8,602
22	Ujiarpur	138	Bibhutipur	BJP	38,139	RJD	35,343	CPI(M)	25,064	2,796
22	Ujiarpur	—	Postal Ballot	BJP	13	RJD	2	JD(U)	0	11
23	Samastipur (SC)	78	Kusheshwar Asthan (SC)	INC	34,642	JD(U)	32,458	LJP	32,017	2,184
23	Samastipur (SC)	84	Hayaghat	INC	40,072	LJP	32,685	JD(U)	26,671	7,387
23	Samastipur (SC)	131	Kalyanpur (SC)	LJP	60,535	INC	42,452	JD(U)	37,387	18,083
23	Samastipur (SC)	132	Warisnagar	INC	48,307	JD(U)	46,205	LJP	41,182	2,102
23	Samastipur (SC)	133	Samastipur	LJP	52,913	INC	51,125	JD(U)	19,934	1,788
23	Samastipur (SC)	139	Rosera (SC)	LJP	51,059	INC	46,930	JD(U)	37,465	4,129
23	Samastipur (SC)	—	Postal Ballot	LJP	10	JD(U)	4	INC	1	6
24	Begusarai	141	Cheria Bariarpur	BJP	51,650	RJD	49,750	CPI	23,232	1,900
24	Begusarai	142	Bachhwara	BJP	58,815	RJD	56,135	CPI	25,905	2,680
24	Begusarai	143	Teghra	BJP	68,278	RJD	45,529	CPI	29,636	22,749
24	Begusarai	144	Matihani	BJP	74,058	RJD	59,321	CPI	29,897	14,737
24	Begusarai	145	Sahebpur Kamal	RJD	62,553	BJP	45,628	CPI	19,084	16,925
24	Begusarai	146	Begusarai	BJP	78,009	RJD	51,078	CPI	25,919	26,931
24	Begusarai	147	Bakhri (SC)	BJP	51,549	RJD	45,333	CPI	38,919	6,216
24	Begusarai	—	Postal Ballot	BJP	240	RJD	193	CPI	47	47
25	Khagaria	76	Simri Bakhtiarpur	LJP	59,204	JD(U)	46,738	RJD	35,225	12,466
25	Khagaria	140	Hasanpur	RJD	48,475	LJP	41,160	JD(U)	30,980	7,315
25	Khagaria	148	Alauli (SC)	JD(U)	41,264	LJP	34,736	RJD	34,171	6,528
25	Khagaria	149	Khagaria	LJP	54,497	RJD	32,462	JD(U)	31,789	22,035
25	Khagaria	150	Beldaur	LJP	50,156	JD(U)	48,065	RJD	39,765	2,091
25	Khagaria	151	Parbatta	LJP	73,983	RJD	47,674	JD(U)	21,453	26,309
25	Khagaria	—	Postal Ballot	LJP	70	RJD	31	JD(U)	27	39
26	Bhagalpur	152	Bihpur	RJD	62,876	BJP	50,749	JD(U)	11,292	12,127
26	Bhagalpur	153	Gopalpur	RJD	54,935	BJP	51,818	JD(U)	25,236	3,117
26	Bhagalpur	154	Pirpainti (SC)	RJD	64,032	BJP	57,343	JD(U)	30,941	6,689
26	Bhagalpur	155	Kahalgaon	RJD	62,029	BJP	60,335	JD(U)	28,812	1,694
26	Bhagalpur	156	Bhagalpur	BJP	79,301	RJD	46,926	JD(U)	17,101	32,375
26	Bhagalpur	158	Nathnagar	RJD	76,821	BJP	58,537	JD(U)	18,874	18,284
26	Bhagalpur	—	Postal Ballot	BJP	55	RJD	4	AAP	3	51
27	Banka	157	Sultanganj	BJP	54,314	RJD	52,097	CPI	33,528	2,217
27	Banka	159	Amarpur	BJP	58,552	RJD	47,071	CPI	33,290	11,481
27	Banka	160	Dhauraiya (SC)	CPI	61,464	RJD	40,559	BJP	36,386	20,905
27	Banka	161	Banka	BJP	47,498	RJD	42,614	CPI	29,804	4,884
27	Banka	162	Katoria (ST)	RJD	49,782	BJP	39,602	CPI	21,523	10,180
27	Banka	163	Belhar	RJD	53,025	CPI	41,094	BJP	38,628	11,931
27	Banka	—	Postal Ballot	BJP	26	CPI	5	RJD	2	21
28	Munger	165	Munger	LJP	64,567	RJD	45,718	JD(U)	34,175	18,849
28	Munger	166	Jamalpur	LJP	55,634	JD(U)	34,179	RJD	31,900	21,455
28	Munger	167	Suryagarha	LJP	49,973	JD(U)	49,696	RJD	35,135	277
28	Munger	168	Lakhisarai	LJP	65,679	JD(U)	56,674	RJD	27,519	9,005
28	Munger	178	Mokama	LJP	60,042	JD(U)	33,661	RJD	18,771	26,381
28	Munger	179	Barh	LJP	56,968	JD(U)	35,433	RJD	23,913	21,535
28	Munger	—	Postal Ballot	LJP	48	RJD	15	JD(U)	9	33
29	Nalanda	171	Asthawan	JD(U)	48,146	LJP	39,479	INC	11,033	8,667
29	Nalanda	172	Biharsharif	LJP	64,761	JD(U)	58,048	INC	16,542	6,713
29	Nalanda	173	Rajgir (SC)	LJP	56,143	JD(U)	36,409	INC	17,390	19,734
29	Nalanda	174	Islampur	JD(U)	38,755	LJP	33,343	INC	26,436	5,412
29	Nalanda	175	Hilsa	JD(U)	39,632	LJP	33,215	INC	22,829	6,417
29	Nalanda	176	Nalanda	LJP	50,540	JD(U)	46,409	INC	15,881	4,131
29	Nalanda	177	Harnaut	JD(U)	54,539	LJP	34,834	INC	17,147	19,705
29	Nalanda	—	Postal Ballot	JD(U)	44	LJP	40	INC	12	4
30	Patna Sahib	180	Bakhtiarpur	BJP	51,514	INC	40,756	JD(U)	20,000	10,758
30	Patna Sahib	181	Digha	BJP	96,398	INC	35,235	JD(U)	17,900	61,163
30	Patna Sahib	182	Bankipur	BJP	88,724	INC	26,108	JD(U)	12,389	62,616
30	Patna Sahib	183	Kumhrar	BJP	93,286	INC	29,253	JD(U)	13,765	64,033
30	Patna Sahib	184	Patna Sahib	BJP	1,04,473	INC	42,364	JD(U)	13,907	62,109
30	Patna Sahib	185	Fatuha	BJP	50,063	INC	45,977	JD(U)	12,748	4,086
30	Patna Sahib	—	Postal Ballot	BJP	1,447	INC	407	JD(U)	315	1,040
31	Pataliputra	186	Danapur	BJP	78,737	RJD	54,973	JD(U)	11,418	23,764
31	Pataliputra	187	Maner	RJD	70,268	BJP	63,293	JD(U)	11,565	6,975
31	Pataliputra	188	Phulwari (SC)	BJP	69,021	RJD	52,921	JD(U)	26,538	16,100
31	Pataliputra	189	Masaurhi (SC)	RJD	64,864	BJP	52,734	JD(U)	23,268	12,130
31	Pataliputra	190	Paliganj	RJD	47,058	BJP	45,773	JD(U)	14,229	1,285
31	Pataliputra	191	Bikram	BJP	72,674	RJD	52,394	JD(U)	9,988	20,280
31	Pataliputra	—	Postal Ballot	BJP	1,030	RJD	462	JD(U)	222	568
32	Arrah	192	Sandesh	BJP	48,154	RJD	38,691	CPI(ML)	17,807	9,463
32	Arrah	193	Barhara	BJP	72,526	RJD	30,917	JD(U)	14,389	41,609
32	Arrah	194	Arrah	BJP	74,361	RJD	40,959	JD(U)	8,860	33,402
32	Arrah	195	Agiaon (SC)	BJP	37,894	RJD	28,517	CPI(ML)	22,989	9,377
32	Arrah	196	Tarari	BJP	49,640	RJD	30,856	CPI(ML)	26,200	18,784
32	Arrah	197	Jagdishpur	RJD	47,671	BJP	45,562	CPI(ML)	14,540	2,109
32	Arrah	198	Shahpur	BJP	62,816	RJD	37,569	JD(U)	12,717	25,247
32	Arrah	—	Postal Ballot	BJP	121	RJD	24	AAP	6	97
33	Buxar	199	Brahampur	BJP	66,559	RJD	39,542	BSP	17,740	27,017
33	Buxar	200	Buxar	BJP	61,007	BSP	33,364	RJD	27,909	27,643
33	Buxar	201	Dumraon	BJP	52,855	RJD	28,256	BSP	25,950	24,599
33	Buxar	202	Rajpur (SC)	BJP	49,455	BSP	45,956	RJD	27,771	3,499
33	Buxar	203	Ramgarh	BSP	44,291	BJP	38,596	RJD	37,660	5,695
33	Buxar	210	Dinara	BJP	50,482	RJD	25,529	JD(U)	18,969	24,953
33	Buxar	—	Postal Ballot	BJP	58	RJD	7	AAP	5	51
34	Sasaram (SC)	204	Mohania (SC)	INC	56,995	BJP	54,376	JD(U)	8,653	2,619
34	Sasaram (SC)	205	Bhabua	BJP	60,663	INC	40,299	JD(U)	19,102	20,364
34	Sasaram (SC)	206	Chainpur	BJP	68,923	INC	38,200	JD(U)	18,720	30,723
34	Sasaram (SC)	207	Chenari (SC)	BJP	59,738	INC	48,423	JD(U)	10,150	11,315
34	Sasaram (SC)	208	Sasaram	BJP	66,704	INC	64,566	JD(U)	9,821	2,138
34	Sasaram (SC)	209	Kargahar	BJP	55,172	INC	53,902	JD(U)	26,692	1,270
34	Sasaram (SC)	—	Postal Ballot	BJP	511	INC	375	JD(U)	172	136
35	Karakat	211	Nokha	RLSP	50,519	RJD	36,751	JD(U)	15,445	13,768
35	Karakat	212	Dehri	RLSP	65,162	RJD	34,332	JD(U)	8,245	30,830
35	Karakat	213	Karakat	RLSP	56,211	RJD	40,925	CPI(ML)	11,256	15,286
35	Karakat	219	Goh	RLSP	55,455	RJD	47,556	JD(U)	14,551	7,899
35	Karakat	220	Obra	RLSP	56,115	RJD	42,074	JD(U)	16,392	14,041
35	Karakat	221	Nabinagar	RLSP	55,359	RJD	31,981	BSP	11,209	23,378
35	Karakat	—	Postal Ballot	RLSP	71	RJD	32	JD(U)	10	39
36	Jahanabad	214	Arwal	RLSP	53,612	RJD	36,875	JD(U)	11,694	16,737
36	Jahanabad	215	Kurtha	RLSP	49,835	RJD	41,322	JD(U)	14,026	8,513
36	Jahanabad	216	Jahanabad	RLSP	62,019	RJD	55,817	JD(U)	16,604	6,202
36	Jahanabad	217	Ghosi	RLSP	55,615	RJD	45,235	JD(U)	17,990	10,380
36	Jahanabad	218	Makhadumapur (SC)	RLSP	50,907	RJD	47,087	JD(U)	13,907	3,820
36	Jahanabad	233	Atri	RJD	53,750	RLSP	50,434	JD(U)	26,590	3,316
36	Jahanabad	—	Postal Ballot	RLSP	225	RJD	221	JD(U)	40	4
37	Aurangabad	222	Kutumba (SC)	BJP	42,359	INC	32,042	JD(U)	25,500	10,317
37	Aurangabad	223	Aurangabad	BJP	53,180	INC	50,994	JD(U)	15,868	2,186
37	Aurangabad	224	Rafiganj	BJP	50,403	INC	46,333	JD(U)	26,700	4,070
37	Aurangabad	225	Gurua	BJP	49,281	INC	37,348	JD(U)	27,226	11,933
37	Aurangabad	227	Imamganj (SC)	BJP	47,315	INC	30,032	JD(U)	26,157	17,283
37	Aurangabad	231	Tikari	BJP	65,067	INC	44,684	JD(U)	14,594	20,383
37	Aurangabad	—	Postal Ballot	BJP	336	INC	161	JD(U)	92	175
38	Gaya (SC)	226	Sherghati	BJP	45,635	RJD	35,618	JD(U)	22,923	10,017
38	Gaya (SC)	228	Barachatti (SC)	BJP	39,385	RJD	35,786	JD(U)	31,499	3,599
38	Gaya (SC)	229	Bodh Gaya (SC)	BJP	48,563	RJD	44,837	JD(U)	27,893	3,726
38	Gaya (SC)	230	Gaya Town	BJP	72,691	RJD	22,577	JD(U)	11,741	50,114
38	Gaya (SC)	232	Belaganj	BJP	54,153	RJD	39,633	JD(U)	16,598	14,520
38	Gaya (SC)	234	Wazirganj	BJP	64,613	RJD	31,591	JD(U)	20,749	33,022
38	Gaya (SC)	—	Postal Ballot	BJP	1,190	RJD	684	JD(U)	425	506
39	Nawada	170	Barbigha	BJP	56,544	JD(U)	23,686	RJD	14,877	32,858
39	Nawada	235	Rajauli (SC)	RJD	51,614	BJP	50,636	JD(U)	27,468	978
39	Nawada	236	Hisua	BJP	87,372	RJD	52,331	JD(U)	25,847	35,041
39	Nawada	237	Nawada	BJP	63,468	RJD	53,552	JD(U)	31,374	9,916
39	Nawada	238	Gobindpur	BJP	45,902	RJD	34,538	JD(U)	33,398	11,364
39	Nawada	239	Warsaliganj	BJP	86,283	RJD	43,174	JD(U)	26,436	43,109
39	Nawada	—	Postal Ballot	BJP	43	JD(U)	8	RJD	5	35
40	Jamui (SC)	164	Tarapur	LJP	47,956	RJD	39,662	JD(U)	38,531	8,294
40	Jamui (SC)	169	Sheikhpura	LJP	38,797	JD(U)	38,041	RJD	23,257	756
40	Jamui (SC)	240	Sikandra (SC)	LJP	43,521	JD(U)	35,904	RJD	30,725	7,617
40	Jamui (SC)	241	Jamui	LJP	65,059	RJD	31,635	JD(U)	26,665	33,424
40	Jamui (SC)	242	Jhajha	LJP	44,650	RJD	40,968	JD(U)	40,585	3,682
40	Jamui (SC)	243	Chakai	LJP	45,351	RJD	33,154	JD(U)	18,865	12,197
40	Jamui (SC)	—	Postal Ballot	LJP	20	JD(U)	8	RJD	6	12
