= Jhanjharpur Lok Sabha constituency =

Lok Sabha constituency in Bihar

Coordinates: 26.2667°N 86.2833°E

Jhanjharpur
- Lok Sabha constituency

Constituency details
- Country: India
- Region: East India
- State: Bihar
- Established: 1971
- Reservation: None

Member of Parliament
- 18th Lok Sabha
- Incumbent Ramprit Mandal
- Party: JD(U)
- Alliance: NDA
- Elected year: 2024

Jhanjharpur Lok Sabha constituency is one of the 40 Lok Sabha (parliamentary) constituencies in Bihar state in eastern India.

== Assembly segments ==
From the 2009 Lok Sabha elections, Jhanjharpur Lok Sabha constituency comprises the following six Vidhan Sabha (legislative assembly) segments:

#	Name	District	Member	Party	2024 lead
33	Khajauli	Madhubani	Arun Shankar Prasad	BJP	JD(U)
34	Babubarhi	Madhubani	Mina Kumari	JD(U)	JD(U)
37	Rajnagar (SC)	Madhubani	Sujit Paswan	BJP	JD(U)
38	Jhanjharpur	Madhubani	Nitish Mishra	BJP	JD(U)
39	Phulparas	Madhubani	Sheela Mandal	JD(U)	JD(U)
40	Laukaha	Madhubani	Satish Kumar Sah	JD(U)	JD(U)

== Members of Parliament ==
Year	Name	Party
1971	Jagannath Mishra	Indian National Congress
1977	Dhanik Lal Mandal	Janata Party
1980	Dhanik Lal Mandal	Janata Party (Secular)
1984	Gauri Shankar Rajhans	Indian National Congress
1989	Devendra Yadav	Janata Dal
1991	Devendra Yadav	Janata Dal
1996	Devendra Yadav	Janata Dal
1998	Surendra Yadav	Rashtriya Janata Dal
1999	Devendra Yadav	Janata Dal (United)
2004	Devendra Yadav	Rashtriya Janata Dal
2009	Mangani Lal Mandal	Janata Dal (United)
2014	Birendra Chaudhary	Bharatiya Janata Party
2019	Ramprit Mandal	Janata Dal (United)
2024	Ramprit Mandal	Janata Dal (United)

== Election results ==
=== 2024 ===
2024 Indian general elections: Jhanjharpur
Party	Candidate	Votes	%	±%
JD(U)	Ramprit Mandal	533,032	48.73	−8.07
VIP	Suman Kumar Mahaseth	3,48,863	31.9	N/A
NOTA	None of the Above	35,928	3.28	
Independent	Rajiv Jha	12,513	1.1	None
Majority		1,84,169	16.83	−13.62
Turnout		10,94,117	54.56	
JD(U) hold		Swing		

=== 2019 ===
2019 Indian general elections: Jhanjharpur
Party	Candidate	Votes	%	±%
JD(U)	Ramprit Mandal	602,391	56.80	+37.3
RJD	Gulab Yadav	2,79,440	26.35	−3.4
IND	Bipeen Kumar Singhwait	29,506	2.78	
SJDD	Devendra Prasad Yadav	25,630	2.42	
IND	Om Prakash Poddar	21,988	2.07	
IND	Ganpati Jha	21,632	2.04	
NOTA	None of the Above	9,203	0.87	
Majority		3,22,951	30.45	+24.56
Turnout		10,62,391	57.35	
JD(U) gain from BJP		Swing		

=== 2014 ===
2014 Indian general elections: Jhanjharpur
Party	Candidate	Votes	%	±%
BJP	Birendra Kumar Chaudhary	3,35,481	35.64	+35.64
RJD	Mangani Lal Mandal	2,80,073	29.75	−1.91
JD(U)	Devendra Prasad Yadav	1,83,591	19.50	−24.13
IND	Pawan Kumar	17,790	1.89	+1.89
BSP	Manilal Sahu	14,190	1.51	+0.18
IND	Barun Kumar Jha	13,833	1.47	+1.47
NOTA	None of the Above	8,043	0.85	
Majority		55,408		
Turnout		9,41,249	57.02	
BJP gain from JD(U)		Swing		

== See also ==
- Madhubani district
- List of constituencies of the Lok Sabha
