= Guljar Devi Yadav =

Indian politician

Member of Bihar Legislative Assembly
- In office 2010–2020
- Preceded by: Deo Nath Yadav
- Succeeded by: Sheela Kumari
- Constituency: Phulparas

Personal details
- Born: Guljar Devi Yadav; 1 July 1960 (age 65) Vill+Post-Siswabarhi, Maya-Phulparas, Dist-Madhubani, Bihar
- Party: Janata Dal (United)
- Spouse: Deo Nath Yadav (Husband)
- Profession: Politician, social worker

Guljar Devi Yadav is an Indian politician. She was elected to the Bihar Legislative Assembly from Phulparas. She is a member of the Bihar Legislative Assembly as a member of the JDU. Her husband Deo Nath Yadav also served as a member of the Bihar Legislative Assembly from Phulparas constituency.
