= Karpoori Thakur ministry =

Government of Bihar, India (1977–79)

In the 1977 election to the Bihar Vidhan Sabha, the Janata Party secured 214 out of a total of 325 seats. Karpoori Thakur (जननायक) was elected as leader of the Janata party legislature, defeating Janata party chief Satyendra Narain Sinha, and was sworn in as the Chief Minister of Bihar on 17 June 1977. Here are the names of the ministers:

Portfolio	Minister	Took office	Left office	Party
Chief Minister; Home; General Administration; Education; Information; Power; Labour; Other departments not allocated to any Minister	Karpoori Thakur	24 June 1977	21 April 1979	JP
Second in Command; Minister of Finance	Kailashpati Mishra	24 June 1977	21 April 1979	JP
Minister of Co-operative	Syed Ali Haidar Warsi	24 June 1977	21 April 1979	JP
Minister of Industries	Thakur Prasad	24 June 1977	21 April 1979	JP
Minister of Agriculture; Minister of Parliamentary Affairs	Kapildeo Singh	24 June 1977	21 April 1979	JP
Minister of River Valley Projects	Anup Lal Yadav	24 June 1977	21 April 1979	JP
Minister of Rural Development	Jageshwar Mandal	24 June 1977	21 April 1979	JP
Minister of Urban Development	Sumitra Devi	24 June 1977	21 April 1979	JP
Minister of Irrigation	Sacchidanand Singh	24 June 1977	21 April 1979	JP
Minister of Health & Family Welfare	Jabir Husain	24 June 1977	21 April 1979	JP
Minister of Social Welfare	Kameshwar Paswan	24 June 1977	21 April 1979	JP
Minister of Forest; Minister of Tribal Welfare	Lalit Oraon	24 June 1977	21 April 1979	JP

== Cabinet ministers ==
- Thakur Muneshwar Singh - Energy and later Irrigation Minister
- Samsher Jang Bahadur Singh - Labour Minister
- Yadunath Baskey - Tribal Welfare Minister
