= Bharat Bhushan Mandal =

Indian politician

Member of the Bihar Legislative Assembly
- In office 16 May 2020 – 2025
- Preceded by: Lakshmeshwar Roy
- Succeeded by: Satish Kumar Sah
- Constituency: Laukaha

District President of Rashtriya Janata Dal of Madhubani
- Incumbent
- Assumed office 9 February 2020

Personal details
- Born: 13 November 1958 (age 67) Madhubani, Bihar, India
- Party: Rashtriya Janata Dal
- Spouse: Ragini Devi
- Parent: Dhanik Lal Mandal (father)
- Profession: Politician

Bharat Bhushan Mandal is an Indian politician currently serving as the member of the Bihar Legislative Assembly since 2020 and currently affiliated with Rashtriya Janata Dal party. He was elected as MLA from Laukaha Assembly constituency in Madhubani district, Bihar.

== Early life ==
Mandal was born to Dhanik Lal Mandal in 1958 in Madhubani, Bihar.

== Political career ==
Following the 2020 Bihar Legislative Assembly election, he was elected as an MLA from the Laukaha Assembly constituency by defeating Lakshmeshwar Ray of the Janata Dal (United) with a margin of 9,471 votes.

Mandal was nominated as the new district president of the RJD on 9 February 2020.

== Personal life ==
He is married to Ragini Devi. He is a brother-in-law of another Bihar politician and former minister for transport in Government of Bihar Sheela Mandal.
