= Akhtarul Islam Shahin =

Indian politician

Member of Bihar Legislative Assembly
- In office 2010–2025
- Preceded by: Ram Nath Thakur
- Succeeded by: Ashwamedh Devi
- Constituency: Samastipur

Personal details
- Born: Samastipur, Bihar, India
- Party: Rashtriya Janata Dal

Akhtarul Islam Shahin is an Indian politician from Bihar. He is serving as a third term member of the Bihar Legislative Assembly from Samastipur Assembly constituency since 2010. He is a representing the Rashtriya Janata Dal, led by Lalu Prasad Yadav and Tejashwi Yadav. He is the deputy chief whip of Rashtriya Janata Dal, the main opposition party in the state legislature since 2022.

== Early life and education ==
Shahin was born to Abdus Salam in Samastipur district of Bihar. He has completed his Intermediate from Inter College, Patna.

== Career ==
Akhtarul Islam Shahin fought 2010 Bihar Legislative Assembly election at the age of 31 from Samastipur Assembly constituency as a candidate of Rashtriya Janata Dal and won against nearest rival Ram Nath Thakur of Janata Dal (United) with a margin of 1827 votes. He again won 2015 Bihar Legislative Assembly election from the same constituency against the nearest rival Renu Kumari, a candidate of Bharatiya Janata Party with a margin of 31080 votes. He won 2020 Bihar Legislative Assembly election from the same constituency against the rival candidate Ashwamedh Devi of Janata Dal (United) with a margin of 4714 votes.
