= Lal Bihari Yadav =

Lal Bihari Yadav may refer to:

- Lal Bihari Yadav (Bihar politician)
- Lal Bihari Yadav (Uttar Pradesh politician)
