= Karpoori Thakur =

Indian politician (1924–1988)

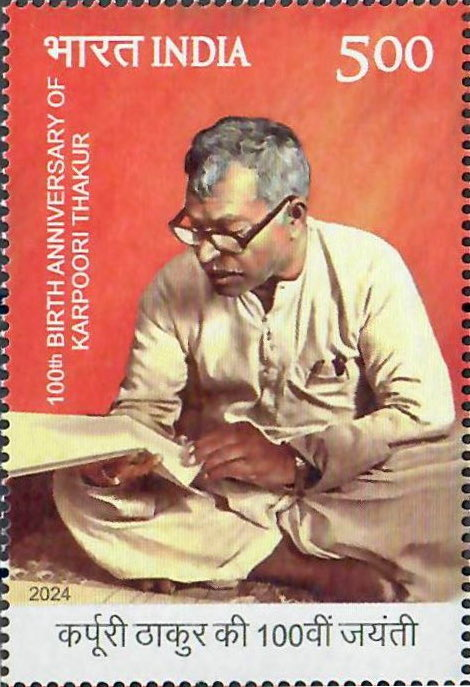

Leader of the opposition Bihar Legislative Assembly
- In office 30 June 1980 – 12 February 1988
- Chief Minister: Jagannath Mishra; Chandrashekhar Singh; Bindeshwari Dubey
- Preceded by: Jagannath Mishra
- Succeeded by: Lalu Prasad Yadav

11th Chief Minister of Bihar
- In office 24 June 1977 – 21 April 1979
- Preceded by: Jagannath Mishra
- Succeeded by: Ram Sunder Das
- In office 22 December 1970 – 2 June 1971
- Preceded by: Daroga Prasad Rai
- Succeeded by: Bhola Paswan Shashtri

2nd Deputy Chief Minister of Bihar
- In office 5 March 1967 – 31 January 1968
- Chief Minister: Mahamaya Prasad Sinha
- Preceded by: Anugrah Narayan Sinha
- Succeeded by: Sushil Kumar Modi

Minister of Education Government of Bihar
- In office 5 March 1967 – 31 January 1968
- Chief Minister: Mahamaya Prasad Sinha
- Preceded by: Satyendra Narayan Sinha
- Succeeded by: Satish Prasad Singh

Member of Bihar Legislative Assembly
- In office 1985–1988
- Preceded by: Anwarul Haque
- Succeeded by: Ram Jiwan Prasad
- Constituency: Sonbarsa
- In office 1980–1985
- Preceded by: Chandra Shekhar Singh
- Succeeded by: Ashok Singh
- Constituency: Samastipur
- In office 1977–1980
- Preceded by: Devendra Prasad Yadav
- Succeeded by: Surendra Yadav
- Constituency: Phulparas
- In office 1952–1977
- Preceded by: Constituency created
- Succeeded by: Constituency defunct
- Constituency: Tajpur

Personal details
- Born: 24 January 1924 Pitaunjhia, Bihar and Orissa Province, British India
- Died: 17 February 1988 (aged 64) Patna, Bihar, India
- Party: Socialist Party, Bharatiya Kranti Dal, Janata Party, Lok Dal
- Spouse: Phuleshwari devi
- Children: Ram Nath Thakur (son)
- Occupation: Freedom fighter, teacher, politician
- Awards: Bharat Ratna (2024)

Karpoori Thakur (24 January 1924 – 17 February 1988) was an Indian politician who twice served as the 11th Chief Minister of Bihar, first from December 1970 to June 1971, and then from June 1977 to April 1979. He was popularly known as Jan Nayak (transl. people's leader). On 26 January 2024, he was posthumously awarded India's highest civilian honour, the Bharat Ratna, by the Government of India. This was announced by the President of India Draupadi Murmu on 23 January 2024.

== Biography ==
Karpoori Thakur was born to Gokul Thakur and Ramdulari Devi at Pitaunjhia (now Karpuri Gram) village in Samastipur District of Bihar. He belonged to the Nai community. He was influenced by Mahatma Gandhi and Satyanarayan Sinha. He joined the All India Students Federation. As a student activist, he left his graduate college to join the Quit India Movement. For his participation in the Indian independence movement, he spent 26 months in prison.

After India gained independence, Thakur worked as a teacher in his village's school. He became a member of the Bihar Vidhan Sabha in 1952 from Tajpur constituency as a Socialist Party candidate. He was arrested for leading Post and Telegraph employees during the general strike of the Central Government employees in 1960. In 1970, he undertook a fast unto death for 28 days to promote the cause of Telco labourers.

Thakur was a votary of Hindi language, and as the education minister of Bihar, he removed English as the compulsory subject for the matriculation curriculum. It is alleged that the Bihar's students suffered due to the resulting low standards of English-medium education in the state. Thakur served as a minister and Deputy Chief Minister of Bihar, before becoming the first non-Congress socialist Chief Minister of Bihar in 1970. He also enforced total prohibition of alcohol in Bihar. During his reign, many schools and colleges were established in his name in the backward areas of Bihar.

Academic S.N. Malakar, who belongs to one of the Most Backward Classes (MBCs) of Bihar and had participated in the agitation supporting Karpoori Thakur’s reservation policy in the 1970s as a student activist belonging to the All India Students Federation (AISF) contends that the subaltern classes of Bihar – MBCs, dalits and upper OBCs had already gained confidence during the time of the Janata Party government.

Chet Ram Tomar of Bulandshahr was his close ally. A socialist leader, Thakur was close to Jaya Prakash Narayan. During the emergency in India (1975–77), he and other prominent leaders of Janata Party led the "Total Revolution" movement aimed at non-violent transformation of Indian society.

In the 1977 Bihar Legislative Assembly election, the ruling Indian National Congress suffered a heavy defeat at the hands of Janata Party. Janata Party was a recent amalgam of disparate groups including Indian National Congress (Organisation), Charan Singh's Bharatiya Lok Dal (BLD), Socialist Party and Hindu Nationalists of Bharatiya Jana Sangh. The sole purpose of these groups joining together was to defeat Prime Minister Indira Gandhi, who had imposed a nationwide emergency and curtailed many freedoms. There were also social cleavages with Socialists and BLD representing backward castes and Congress(O) and Jana Sangh the upper castes.

After the Janata Party came to power, Thakur became Chief Minister of Bihar for the second time by winning the legislative party election against Janata Party President Satyendra Narayan Sinha, formerly of Indian National Congress (Organisation), by a vote of 144 to 84. Infighting in the party broke over the question of Thakur's decision to implement the Mungeri Lal Commission report, that recommended the institution of reservations for Backward Castes in government jobs. Upper caste members of the Janata Party tried to water down the reservation policy by unseating Thakur as Chief Minister. To wean away Dalit MLAs, Ram Sundar Das, a Dalit himself, was nominated as the candidate. Though both Das and Thakur were socialists, Das was considered more moderate and accommodating than the Chief Minister. Thakur resigned and Das became the Chief Minister of Bihar on 21 April 1979. The reservation law was weakened by allowing upper castes to obtain a greater percentage of government jobs. The internal tensions in the Janata Party caused it to split into multiple factions which led to Congress to return to power in 1980. However, he could not last his full term because he lost the leadership battle in 1979 from Ram Sundar Das whom his adversaries placed against him and was replaced as chief minister.

When Janata Party split in July 1979, Karpoori Thakur sided with the outgoing Charan Singh faction. He was elected from Samastipur (Vidhan Sabha constituency) to Bihar Vidhan Sabha as Janata Party (Secular) candidate in 1980 elections. His party changed its name to Bharatiya Lok Dal later, and Thakur was elected to Bihar Vidhan Sabha as its candidate in 1985 election from Sonbarsa constituency. He died before this Vidhan Sabha could complete its term.

Thakur was known as the champion of the poor. In 1978, Karpoori Thakur introduced 26% reservation model in Bihar, for the backward classes in the government jobs. In this layered reservation regime, Other Backward Class got 12%, Most Backward Class got 8%, women got 3%, and economically backward classes (EBWs) from among the upper castes got 3% reservation in state government jobs. In 1977, Devendra Prasad Yadav resigned from the Bihar Vidhan Sabha and paved the way for Thakur to contest the Phulparas Vidhan Sabha constituency by-election. Thakur won by the margin of 65000 votes, defeating Ram Jaipal Singh Yadav of INC.

Thakur served as the President of Samyukta Socialist Party. He is called a mentor to the prominent Bihari leaders such as Lalu Prasad Yadav, Ram Vilas Paswan, Devendra Prasad Yadav and Nitish Kumar.

== National honours ==
=== India ===
- 2024 – Bharat Ratna, India's highest civilian award.

== Legacy ==
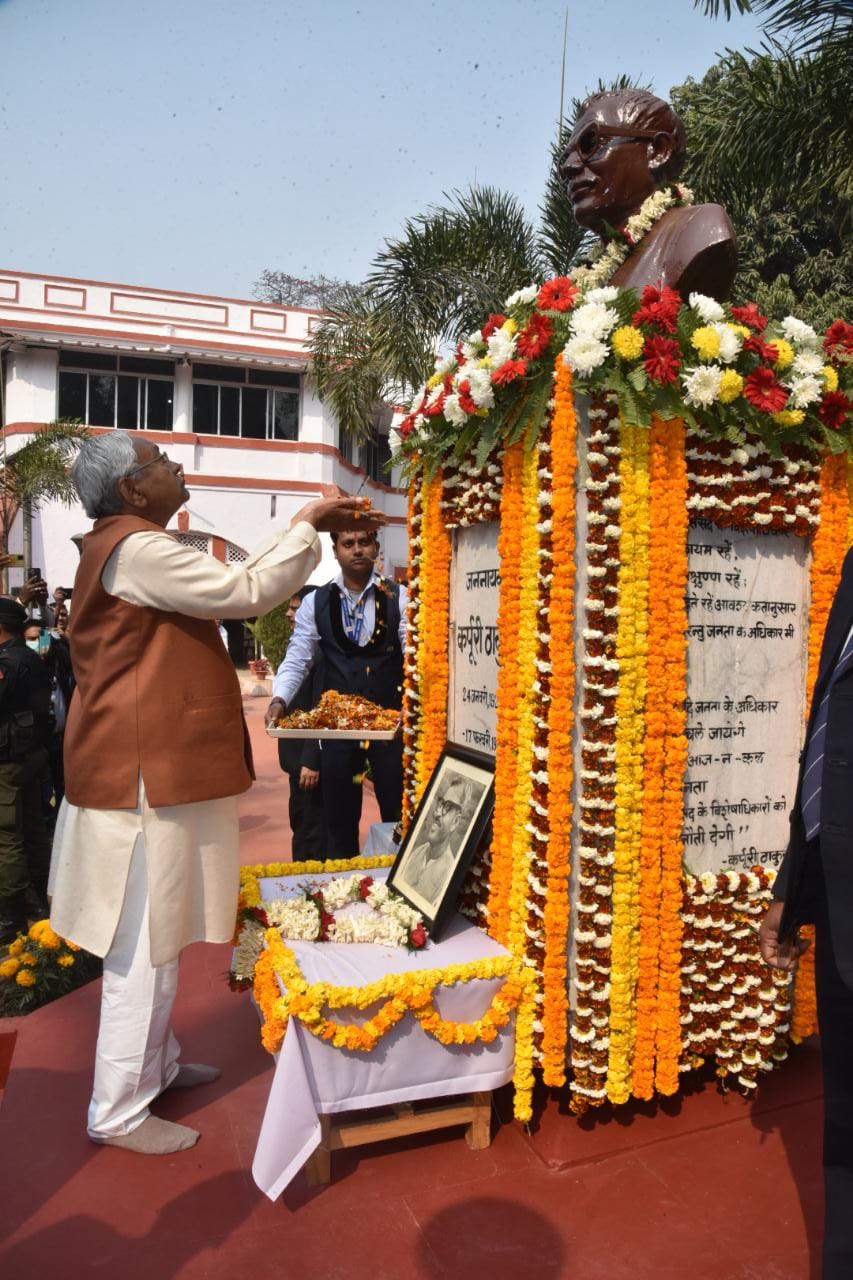
Chief Minister of Bihar, Nitish Kumar paying tribute to Karpoori Thakur on 17 February 2023.

- Karpoori Thakur's birthplace, Pitaunjhia, was renamed to Karpuri Gram (Hindi for "Karpuri village") after his death in 1988.
- Commemorative coin of denomination Rupees 100 launched
- The Jan Nayak Karpuri Thakur Vidhi Mahavidyalaya (Law College) in Buxar is also named after him.
- Bihar Government opened Jannayak Karpoori Thakur Medical College in Madhepura.
- The Department of Posts released a commemorative stamp in his memory.
- Tussle on legacy by Janata Dal (United) and Rashtriya Janata Dal
- Jan Nayak Express Train running between Darbhanga & Amritsar by Indian Railway.
- The government has taken immense commemorative measures that include naming several stadiums after Jan Nayak Karpuri Thakur in the state, establishment of scores of colleges and statues in most of the districts, Karpuri Thakur Museum, Jan Nayak Karpuri Thakur hospitals in Samastipur and Darbhanga, publication of Karpuri Thakur's speeches in legislative and documentary formation on Karpuri Thakur.
- A commemorative postage stamp was released by department of India Post to mark his 100th birth anniversary.
- January 24, holds increasing political significance in Bihar, marked by the birth anniversary of former Chief Minister Karpoori Thakur. Despite his Hajjam community constituting under 2% of the population, his legacy is fiercely claimed due to his association with the influential Extremely Backward Classes (EBC), which represent 29% of voters. Karpoori’s leadership helped shape Bihar's politics, especially in empowering marginalized groups. He was Bihar’s first non-Congress CM and served twice as Chief Minister. His influence remains central, with his legacy often invoked in political debates. His son, Ram Nath Thakur, notes the growing competition for his father's legacy.

== See also ==
- Karpoori Thakur ministry (1977–79)
