= Jabir Husain =

Indian politician

Member of the Rajya Sabha
- In office 5 April 2006 – 2 April 2012
- Constituency: Bihar

Chairperson of the Bihar Legislative Council
- In office 1995–2006

Minister of Health Government of Bihar
- In office 1977–1979

Member of the Bihar Legislative Assembly
- In office 1977–1979
- Constituency: Munger, Bihar

Personal details
- Born: 5 June 1945 (age 81) Nonhi, Rajgir, Bihar

Jabir Husain (born 5 June 1945) is an Indian writer, historian and politician. He is a former Member of the Rajya Sabha representing Bihar. He was affiliated with the Janata Dal and Rashtriya Janata Dal.

== Background ==
Jabir Husain was born on 5 June 1945 in Nonhi Village, Rajgir in a well-to-do Shia Muslim family. He started his professional journey as a professor in English language and literature in RD&DJ College Munger, a constituent college of Bhagalpur University. In 1974 on call of Jayprakash Narayan, he got deeply involved and actively participated in Total Revolution. As a result, he was persecuted and suspended from University service. He was also an English teacher.

== Political career ==
In 1977 on Janta Party ticket, Prof Husain fought the Bihar Legislative Assembly election from Munger constituency. He won the election by 41441 votes, the highest margin in the state. This stellar result earned him a cabinet berth in the Karpoori Thakur ministry. He was appointed as Health Minister.

From October, 1990 to March, 1995 Prof Husain served as Chairman of the Bihar State Minority Commission.

=== Bihar Vidhan Parishad ===
In June 1994 the Governor of Bihar nominated Prof Husain to Bihar Legislative Council . A year later in April 1995, he was appointed as Acting Chairman of the council. And finally on 26 July 1996 he was elected uncontested the Chairman of Bihar Legislative Council. After competing his term he was reappointed and elected unopposed as Chairman again on 7 May 2000.

=== Rajya Sabha ===
Prof. Jabir Husain was elected to the Rajya Sabha on 29 March 2006 and subsequently, he relinquished the post of chairman, Bihar Vidhan Parishad on 15 April 2006. He completed his 6-year term on 2 April 2012.

== Literary works ==
Prof. Husain has authored more than two dozen books in Hindi, Urdu and English. He is also credited for editing over 50 rare Urdu-Persian manuscripts.

=== Honours ===
Sahitya Akademi Puraskar for "Ret par Khema" in Urdu language category in 2005.

Vishwa Hindi Samman at the 9th Vishwa Hindi Conference in Johannesburg in 2012.
