= Sheela Kumari =

Indian politician

Sheela Kumari Mandal
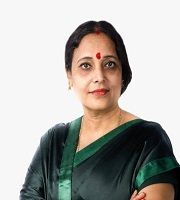

Minister of Science, Technology and Technical Education Government of Bihar
- Incumbent
- Assumed office 07 May 2026
- Chief Minister: Samrat Choudhary
- Preceded by: Vijay Kumar Chaudhary

Member of the Bihar Legislative Assembly
- Incumbent
- Assumed office 10 November 2020
- Preceded by: Guljar Devi Yadav
- Constituency: Phulparas

Minister of Transport Government of Bihar
- In office 16 November 2020 – 20 November 2025
- Chief Minister: Nitish Kumar
- Preceded by: Santosh Kumar Nirala
- Succeeded by: Shrawan Kumar

Personal details
- Born: 1970 (age 55–56) Darbhanga district, Bihar
- Party: Janata Dal (United)
- Spouse: Shailendra Kumar Mandal (m. 1991)

Sheela Kumari Mandal (born 1970) is an Indian Politician and serving as a member of the Bihar Legislative Assembly, from the Phulparas Assembly constituency in the Madhubani district in the state of Bihar. She is currently serving as the Minister of Science, Technology and Technical Education in the Government of Bihar. She won over the symbol of the Janata Dal (United). She formerly served as Minister for Transport and Communication in Government of Bihar.

== Personal life ==
Sheela Kumari Mandal is married to Shailendra Kumar Mandal, an engineer in 1991, they have one son and one daughter.

Her father-in-law Dhanik Lal Mandal was also a Politician and his brother-in-law Bharat Bhushan Mandal is also a politician who is elected Member of Bihar Legislative Assembly from the Laukaha Assembly constituency.

== Controversies ==
In 2020, Sheela Mandal was in controversy for her statement on Veer Kunwar Singh. In a public meeting, she stated that Veer Kunwar Singh belonged to Rajput caste, thereby even amputation of his hand gave him nationwide fame as indian independence activist, on the other hand Ramphal Mandal, who was also an independence activist from an Extremely Backward Caste was not given due recognition despite his sacrifice for the cause of nation.
