= Phulparas Assembly constituency =

Coordinates: 26°20′55″N 86°29′47″E

Phulparas
- Constituency No. 39 for the Bihar Legislative Assembly

Constituency details
- Country: India
- Region: East India
- State: Bihar
- District: Madhubani
- Established: 1951
- Total electors: 320,615
- Reservation: None

Member of Legislative Assembly
- 18th Bihar Legislative Assembly
- Incumbent Sheela Kumari
- Party: JD(U)
- Alliance: NDA
- Elected year: 2025

Phulparas Assembly constituency is an assembly constituency in Madhubani district in the Indian state of Bihar. River Bhutahi Balan, which is one of the wildest rivers in Bihar, flowing through the heart of it.

== Overview ==
As per Delimitation of Parliamentary and Assembly constituencies Order, 2008, No. 39 Phulparas Assembly constituency is composed of the following: Ghoghardiha community development blocks Md. Zubair Alam Pirozgarh panchayat; Mahindwar, Dharamdiha, Godhiyari, Mahathour Khurd, Siswa Barhi, Phulparas, Ramnagar gram panchayats of Phulparas CD Block; Sunder Birajit, Matras, Tardiha, Mahisham, Madhepur East, Madhepur West, Nawada, Karhara, Dara, Doalakh, Mahpatia, Basipatti, Garhgaon, Bhakrain, Bath, Bakwa, Bhargawan, Barsham, Bheja and Rohua Sangram gram panchayats of Madhepur CD Block.

Phulparas Assembly constituency is part of No. 7 Jhanjharpur (Lok Sabha constituency).

== Members of the Legislative Assembly ==
Year	Name	Party
1952	Kashinath Mishra	Indian National Congress
1957	Rashik Lal Yadav	Indian National Congress
1962	Rashik Lal Yadav	Indian National Congress
1967	Dhanik Lal Mandal	Samyukta Socialist Party
1969	Dhanik Lal Mandal	Samyukta Socialist Party
1972	Uttam Lal Yadav	Samyukta Socialist Party
1977	Devendra Prasad Yadav	Janata Party
1977^	Karpoori Thakur	Janata Party
1980	Surendra Yadav	Janata Party (Secular)
1985	Hemlata Yadav	Indian National Congress
1990	Ram Kumar Yadav	Janata Dal
1995	Deo Nath Yadav	Indian National Congress
2000	Ram Kumar Yadav	Janata Dal (United)
2005	Deo Nath Yadav	Samajwadi Party
2005	Deo Nath Yadav	Samajwadi Party
2010	Guljar Devi Yadav	Janata Dal (United)
2015	Guljar Devi Yadav	Janata Dal (United)
2020	Sheela Kumari	Janata Dal (United)
2025	Sheela Kumari	Janata Dal (United)

^by-election

== Election results ==
=== 2025 ===
Bihar Assembly election, 2025: Phulparas
Party	Candidate	Votes	%	±%
JD(U)	Sheela Kumari	93,677	45.65	
INC	Subodh Mandal	79,578	38.78	+3.54
JSP	Jalendra Mishra	6,274	3.06	
Independent	Ram Kumar Yadav	5,553	2.71	
Independent	Vijay Kumar Chaudhari	3,728	1.82	
AAP	Gauri Shankar Yadav	3,635	1.77	
Independent	Baiju Safi	2,872	1.4	
Ekta Dal United	Krishna Mohan	2,423	1.18	
BSP	Vijay Kumar	1,896	0.92	
NOTA	None of the above	4,206	2.05	−0.09
Majority		14,099	6.87	+0.85
Turnout		205,223	64.01	+8.03
JD(U) hold		Swing		

=== 2020 ===
Bihar Assembly election, 2020: Phulparas
Party	Candidate	Votes	%	±%
JD(U)	Sheela Kumari	75,116	41.26	+0.66
INC	Kripanath Pathak	64,150	35.24	
LJP	Binod Kumar Singh	10,088	5.54	
Independent	Gulajar Devi	4,939	2.71	
JAP(L)	Gauri Shankar Yadav	4,916	2.7	−0.43
Independent	Sanjay Kumar Singh Urf Sahil Kumar Singh	4,448	2.44	
Samajwadi Janata Dal Democratic	Ram Kumar Yadav	2,831	1.56	
Independent	Vijay Kumar	2,617	1.44	
Independent	Hriday Narayan Kamat	2,105	1.16	
NOTA	None of the above	3,894	2.14	−1.5
Majority		10,966	6.02	−2.44
Turnout		182,055	55.98	+3.37
JD(U) hold		Swing		

=== 2015 ===
2015 Bihar Legislative Assembly election: Phulparas
Party	Candidate	Votes	%	±%
JD(U)	Guljar Devi	64,368	40.6	
BJP	Ram Sundar Yadav	50,953	32.14	
Independent	Jyoti Jha	10,861	6.85	
CPI(M)	Umesh Kumar Roy	7,431	4.69	
JAP(L)	Gauri Shankar Yadav	4,970	3.13	
SP	Ram Kumar Yadav	3,785	2.39	
BSP	Durganand Mandal	2,626	1.66	
Hind Congress Party	Shambhu Nath Mishra	2,111	1.33	
Independent	Aruna Nand Singh	2,065	1.3	
Aadarsh Mithila Party	Vijay Kumar Jha	1,493	0.94	
NOTA	None of the above	5,778	3.64	
Majority		13,415	8.46	
Turnout		158,555	52.61	
