= Ram Nath Thakur =

Indian politician

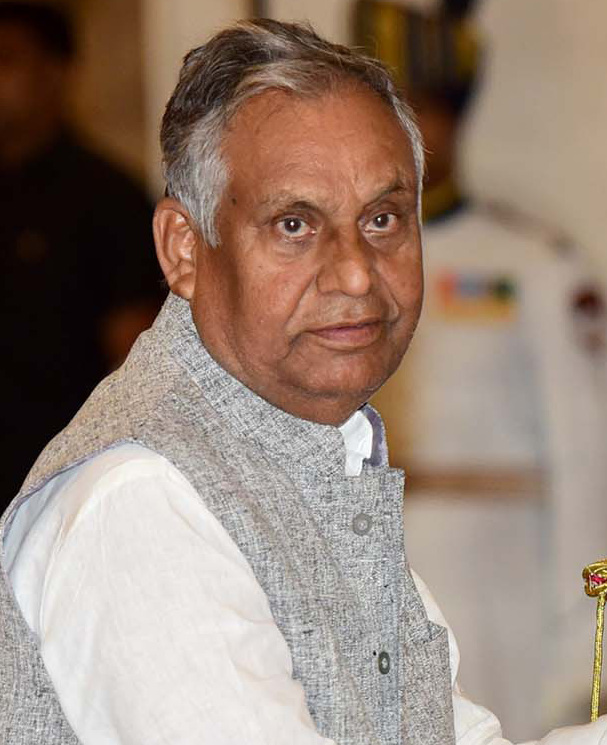
- Thakur In 2024

Union Minister of State Government of India
- Incumbent
- Assumed office 11 June 2024
- Prime Minister: Narendra Modi
- President: Draupadi Murmu
- Ministry&Department's: Ministry of Agriculture and Farmers Welfare
- Minister: Shivraj Singh Chouhan
- Preceded by: Shobha Karandlaje

Member of Parliament, Rajya Sabha
- Incumbent
- Assumed office 10 April 2014
- Preceded by: Sabir Ali
- Constituency: Bihar

Cabinet Minister Government of Bihar
- In office 24 November 2005 – 26 November 2010
- Chief Minister: Nitish Kumar
- Ministry&Department's: Revenue & Land Reforms (until april 2008); Information & Public Relations (from april 2008)
- In office 10 March 1990 – 28 March 1995
- Chief Minister: Lalu Prasad Yadav
- Ministry&Department's: Sugarcane Industries

Member of Bihar Legislative Assembly
- In office 25 February 2000 – 24 November 2010
- Preceded by: Ashok Singh
- Succeeded by: Akhtarul Islam Sahin
- Constituency: Samastipur

Member of Bihar Legislative Council
- In office 28 April 1988 – 25 February 2000

Personal details
- Born: Ram Nath Thakur; 3 March 1950 (age 76) Karpoori Gram, Samastipur district, Bihar
- Party: Janata Dal (United)
- Spouse: Asha Rani
- Children: Three daughters
- Parents: Karpoori Thakur (father); Phooleshwari Devi (mother)
- Profession: Agriculturist
- As of 23 June 2020 Source: Rajya Sabha

Ram Nath Thakur (born 3 March 1950 in Karpoori Gram, Samastipur district, Bihar) a politician from the Janata Dal (United) party, is a member of the Parliament of India representing Bihar in the Rajya Sabha, the upper house of the Parliament. He is Leader of Janata Dal (United) in Rajya Sabha .

Now, He is Minister of State of India in Ministry of Agriculture and Farmers Welfare Modi Cabinate

He was a member of the Bihar Legislative Council and became Minister of Sugarcane Industries in Lalu Prasad's first cabinet. From November 2005 to November 2010 was Minister of Revenue and Land Reforms, Law, Information and Public Relations in the Second Nitish Kumar ministry.

He was elected in for the term April 2014-April-2020. He is son of Late Karpoori Thakur Ex Chief Minister of Bihar.

He belonges to the Nai (OBC) community

== See also ==
- Third Modi ministry
