= Yogeshwar Ghosh Yadav =

Indian politician

- Born: Laukaha, Madhubani, Bengal Presidency
- Died: Madhubani, Bihar
- Other names: Yogeshwar Ghosh
- Occupation: Politician

Yogeshwar Ghosh Yadav was an Indian politician. He was elected as a member of Bihar Legislative Assembly from Laukaha constituency in Madhubani district, Bihar.

== Political life ==
Yogeshwar Ghosh was elected from Laukaha constituency as a ticket on Indian National Congress.
