= Birendra Kumar Chaudhary =

Indian politician

Member of Parliament, Lok Sabha
- In office 2014–2019
- Preceded by: Mangani Lal Mandal
- Succeeded by: Ramprit Mandal
- Constituency: Jhanjharpur

Deputy Chairman of Bihar Legislative Council
- In office 4 August 2009 – 13 June 2010
- Chairman: Tarakant Jha

Member of Bihar Legislative Council
- In office 14 June 2004 – 13 June 2010
- Constituency: elected by Legislative Assembly members

Personal details
- Born: 4 March 1953 (age 72); Jhanjharpur, Madhubani
- Spouse: Geeta Devi
- Children: 2 Sons & 1 Daughter
- Parent: Anant Lal Chaudhary (father)
- Occupation: Political and Social Worker

Birendra Kumar Chaudhary (born 4 March 1953) is an Indian politician from Bihar. He was a former member of parliament from Jhanjharpur Lok Sabha constituency.

== Early life and education ==
Chaudhary was born in Jhanjharpur, Madhubani district, Bihar. He is the son of Anantlal Choudhary. He did his post graduation in 1980 at Lalit Narayan Mithila University after completing his graduation from L.N. Janta College in 1974. He later did L.L.B. at Janata Law College, Dharbanga, in 1983. He married Geeta Devi and they have two sons and a daughter.

== Career ==
Chaudhary started his political life as an MLC and he was a member of the Bihar Legislative Council from 2004 to 2010. From 2006 to 2009, he was a whip in the council. He was elected as an MP in the 2014 Indian general election in Bihar as a Bharatiya Janata Party candidate.
