= Gulab Yadav =

Indian politician

Member of Bihar Legislative Assembly
- In office 2015–2020
- Preceded by: Nitish Mishra
- Succeeded by: Nitish Mishra
- Constituency: Jhanjharpur

Personal details
- Born: 15 February 1968 (age 58) Gangapur, Madhubani, Bihar, India
- Party: Rashtriya Janata Dal (Expelled)
- Education: Matric
- Profession: Politician

Gulab Yadav is an Indian politician. He was elected to the Bihar Legislative Assembly from Jhanjharpur in the 2015 elections as a member of the Rashtriya Janata Dal (RJD).

== Political career ==
Yadav contested the 2019 Lok Sabha election from Jhanjharpur (Lok Sabha constituency) as an RJD candidate but lost. He was later expelled from the Rashtriya Janata Dal for six years due to anti-party activities after he rebelled to field his wife in the MLC elections, which she eventually won.

== Controversies ==
Yadav has faced legal scrutiny regarding financial irregularities and personal conduct. The Enforcement Directorate (ED) conducted raids at multiple locations linked to him in Madhubani and Pune, recovering luxury watches, details of properties in Punjab and Goa, and ₹4 crore in his bank accounts. In October 2024, the ED arrested Yadav along with Bihar-cadre IAS officer Sanjeev Hans in connection with a money laundering case. He was later granted bail by the Patna High Court. Additionally, a woman leveled serious allegations against both Yadav and Hans.
