= Sahdeo Mahato =

Indian politician (1922-74)

Bihar Legislative Assembly
- In office 1952–1957
- Constituency: Dalsinghsarai East
- In office 1957–1962
- Constituency: Samastipur East
- In office 1962–1967
- Constituency: Samastipur East
- In office 1969–1972
- Constituency: Rosera
- In office 1972–1977
- Constituency: Samastipur

Sahdeo Mahato was an Indian independence activist and politician from Bihar, who served as member of Bihar Legislative Assembly for five terms. He was a prominent leader of Indian National Congress in the Samastipur district. Mahato also served in several ministerial offices in his long political career of three decades.

== Life and career ==
Mahato was born in a Koeri Kushwaha family in 1922 in Haripur village, in Rosera police station area of Darbhanga district of contemporary Bihar province in British India. His father was a farmer and as per tradition of those times, his initial education took place at his home. Later, he was enrolled in a primary school at Bhirha. After completing his middle school education, he passed matriculation from Rosera High school. He completed his Intermediate from Chandradhari Mithila college. By this time the Quit India movement of 1942 was launched in India. He participated in this movement as a student and to escape the colonial police he had to seek refuge in the home of his maternal grandparents.

By 1950, he completed his graduation from Arrah college and also completed his master's degree in political science. He also took the bachelor's degree in law. After Indian independence, he started practicing as a lawyer. In 1950s, he worked as lawyer in Samastipur district court. After working as lawyer for two years, he started his political journey and in 1952, he got the opportunity to contest in Bihar Legislative Assembly elections as a member of Indian National Congress. He won in the 1952 Bihar Legislative Assembly elections from Dalsinghsarai East Assembly constituency. In 1957 and 1962 Assembly elections, he won from Samastipur East constituency. In 1969 Assembly elections, he won again from Rosera Assembly constituency and in 1972 Assembly elections, he won for the fifth time from Samastipur constituency again. He also served as parliamentary secretary and soon caught the attention of contemporary Chief Minister Sri Krishna Singh. He served as state minister multiple times (for example in the cabinet led by Binodanand Jha) and got the portfolio of prison affairs, irrigation, power and public works department. In his third term as legislator, he was made cabinet minister of Food and Civil Supplies and later made cabinet minister of production department. He also established Backward Class stipend commission for the financial welfare of backward communities. He was later elected as president of All India Kushwaha Mahasabha, a caste organisation.

== Commemoration ==
In commemoration of Mahato, Government of Bihar established a lane in the Sri Krishna Puri locality of Patna named Sahdeo Mahto Maarg.
