= Tarkishore Prasad =

Indian politician (born 1956)

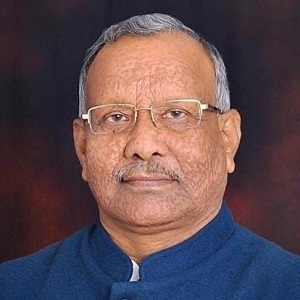

7th Deputy Chief Minister of Bihar
- In office 16 November 2020 – 9 August 2022 Serving with Renu Devi
- Chief Minister: Nitish Kumar
- Preceded by: Sushil Kumar Modi
- Succeeded by: Tejashwi Yadav

Minister of Finance Government of Bihar
- In office 16 November 2020 – 9 August 2022
- Chief Minister: Nitish Kumar
- Preceded by: Sushil Kumar Modi

Minister of Urban Development & Housing Government of Bihar
- In office 16 November 2020 – 9 August 2022
- Chief Minister: Nitish Kumar
- Preceded by: Suresh Kumar Sharma

Minister of Environment & Forest Government of Bihar
- In office 16 November 2020 – 9 February 2021
- Chief Minister: Nitish Kumar
- Preceded by: Sushil Kumar Modi
- Succeeded by: Neeraj Kumar Singh Bablu

Minister of Information Technology Government of Bihar
- In office 16 November 2020 – 9 February 2021
- Chief Minister: Nitish Kumar
- Preceded by: Sushil Kumar Modi
- Succeeded by: Jivesh Mishra

Minister of Disaster Management Government of Bihar
- In office 16 November 2020 – 9 February 2021
- Chief Minister: Nitish Kumar
- Preceded by: Lakshmeshwar Roy
- Succeeded by: Renu Devi

Member of Bihar Legislative Assembly
- Incumbent
- Assumed office 2005
- Preceded by: Ram Prakash Mahto
- Constituency: Katihar

Personal details
- Born: 5 February 1956 (age 70) Saharsa, Bihar, India
- Parent: Ganga Prasad Bhagat (father)
- Education: Darshan Sah College, Lalit Narayan Mithila University

Tarkishore Prasad Bhagat (born 5 February 1956) is an Indian politician belonging to the Bharatiya Janata Party who served as the 5th Deputy Chief Minister of Bihar from 16 November to 9 August 2022.He held the portfolios of Finance & Commercial Taxes along with Urban Development and Housing. He has been elected the BJP's leader in the Bihar assembly. He is currently elected as a Member of the Bihar Legislative Assembly from Katihar constituency in 2020 Bihar Legislative Assembly election.

== Early life and education ==
Tarkishore Prasad Bhagat was born to Ganga Prasad Bhagat, representing the Kalwar caste (Bhagat) In 1956, Tarkishore completed Intermediate of Science from Darshan Sah College in Katihar under Lalit Narayan Mithila University, Darbhanga.

== Political career ==
Prasad is a member of the Rashtriya Swayamsevak Sangh and began his political career with the Akhil Bharatiya Vidyarthi Parishad. He won his first assembly term in 2005 from Katihar seat, defeating Ram Prakash Mahato by just 165 votes. He later won the seat in 2010, 2015 and 2020 elections as well.
