= Ramprit Mandal =

Indian politician

Member of parliament, Lok Sabha
- Incumbent
- Assumed office 23 May 2019
- Preceded by: Birendra Kumar Chaudhary
- Constituency: Jhanjharpur

Personal details
- Born: 1 January 1956 (age 70) Durgipatti (Khutauna Madhubani)
- Party: Janata Dal (United)
- Spouse: Saraswati Devi
- Children: 5
- Parent: Thakan Mandal
- Occupation: Politician

Ramprit Mandal (born January 1, 1956) is an Indian politician and a member of the Indian Parliament, representing the Janata Dal (United) party (JDU) in the Lok Sabha, the lower house of Parliament. He was elected to the 17th Lok Sabha from the Jhanjharpur constituency. In 2024, he has been nominated by the JDU to contest again from the same constituency and won.

== Political background ==
Ramprit Mandal successfully retained the Jhanjharpur seat in the 2024 Lok Sabha election, defeating the candidate from the Vikassheel Insaan Party, an ally of Indian National Developmental Inclusive Alliance by a margin of 184,000 votes. Mandal is a member of Dhanuk caste of Bihar, which is categorised as an Extremely Backward Caste by the state government.

== See also ==
- List of politicians from Bihar
