= Kapildeo Singh =

Indian politician

Kapildeo Singh was an Indian Socialist leader and the General Secretary of the Samajwadi Party.

== Life ==
Singh was a veteran follower of Ram Manohar Lohia and designated the new Samajwadi Party's ideology as one based on socialist ideals of Mahatma Gandhi and Ram Manohar Lohia. He took an active part in the freedom struggle and political emancipation of the masses after independence. He died in 2002, and his funeral was attended by both Mulayam Singh Yadav and Laloo Yadav.
