= Nitish Mishra =

Indian politician

Minister of Housing and Urban Development Government of Bihar
- Incumbent
- Assumed office 07 May 2026
- Chief Minister: Samrat Choudhary
- Preceded by: Samrat Choudhary

Minister of Information Technology Government of Bihar
- Incumbent
- Assumed office 07 May 2026
- Chief Minister: Samrat Choudhary
- Preceded by: Samrat Choudhary

Minister of Industries Government of Bihar
- In office 15 March 2024 – 20 November 2025
- Chief Minister: Nitish Kumar
- Preceded by: Samir Kumar Mahaseth
- Succeeded by: Dilip Kumar Jaiswal

Minister of Rural Development Government of Bihar
- In office 26 November 2010 – 22 February 2015
- Chief Minister: Nitish Kumar; Jitan Ram Manjhi
- Preceded by: Bhagvan Singh Kushwaha

Minister of Disaster Management Government of Bihar
- In office 13 April 2008 – 26 November 2010
- Chief Minister: Nitish Kumar

Minister of Sugarcane Industries Government of Bihar
- In office 24 November 2005 – 13 April 2008
- Chief Minister: Nitish Kumar
- Succeeded by: Gautam Singh

Member of Bihar Legislative Assembly
- Incumbent
- Assumed office 10 November 2020
- Preceded by: Gulab Yadav
- Constituency: Jhanjharpur
- In office 2005–2015
- Preceded by: Jagdish Narayan Chaudhary
- Succeeded by: Gulab Yadav
- Constituency: Jhanjharpur

Minister of Tourism Government of Bihar
- In office 15 March 2024 – 26 February 2025
- Chief Minister: Nitish Kumar
- Preceded by: Tejashwi Yadav
- Succeeded by: Raju Kumar Singh

Personal details
- Born: 9 July 1973 (age 53) Patna, Bihar, India
- Party: Bhartiya Janata Party
- Spouse: Richa Mishra
- Parents: Jagannath Mishra (father); Veena Mishra (mother)
- Relatives: Lalit Narayan Mishra (Uncle)
- Education: Maastricht School of Management, Netherlands (MBA); University of Hull, United Kingdom (Post-graduated diploma)
- Profession: Politician

Nitish Mishra (born 9 July 1973) is an Indian politician hailing from eastern Indian state of Bihar, India. He represented Jhanjharpur assembly constituency in Madhubani district in 13th, 14th and 15th Bihar Legislative Assembly. Presently, he is member of 17th Bihar Legislative Assembly from Jhanjharpur and also former Vice President, BJP - Bihar.

Mishra had been at the helm of various ministries in Bihar government between 2005 and 2015. These included ministry of Rural Development, Department of Social Welfare, Department of Disaster Management(Minister of State, Independent Charge) and Department of Sugarcane Development (Minister of State, Independent Charge).

== Early life and education ==
Nitish Mishra was born in a prominent political family of Bihar. His father Jagannath Mishra served thrice as the Chief Minister of Bihar. Mishra's uncle, Lalit Narayan Mishra was also a well-known politician who held many cabinet berths during his career.

=== School Days ===
Mishra did his schooling at St. Michael's High School, Patna and was also the school captain in 1990-91.

=== College Years ===
Mishra earned a bachelor's degree in history from the Zakir Husain Delhi College University of Delhi in 1994. He won College Crest Award for Co-curricular and Academic Excellence in the same year. In 1995, he graduated from the Fore School of Management, New Delhi and Maastricht School of Management, Netherlands with a Masters in Business Administration) In 1998, he went on to earn a post graduate diploma in Global Political Economy from the University of Hull, United Kingdom. He has also been awarded a Certificate of Completion for the Emerging Leader's Programme from Kennedy School at Harvard University, Executive Education.

=== Pre political career ===
Before joining politics, Mishra was an educationist and also dabbled in social work. From April 1999 to March 2002 he worked as Assistant Director for Bihar Institute of Economic Studies, a non-profit economic and social research organization. From April 2002 to February 2005 Mishra was Additional Director (Administration) of the LN Mishra College of Business Management, Muzaffarpur an autonomous institution under Babasaheb Bhimrao Ambedkar Bihar University.

== Political career ==
=== Performance in Assembly elections ===
Mishra has been consecutively elected to the 13th, 14th and 15th Bihar Legislative Assembly from Mishra family stronghold of Jhanjharpur Assembly Constituency in Madhubani. His father Jagannath Mishra also won the same seat five times(1972 to 1990).

=== Ministerial Berths in Bihar Government ===
Between 2005 and 2015, Mishra held charge of three different ministries in the Bihar Government. He served as Minister, Department of Rural Development,(November 2010 to February 2015), State Minister(Independent Charge), Department of Disaster Management(April 2008 to March 2009), and State Minister(Independent Charge, Department of Sugarcane Development(November 2005 to April 2008).

=== Performance as Minister, Department of Rural Development ===
Mishra is credited with revamping Department of Rural Development during his stint as minister. The department won three national prizes/recognition during his tenure. Two of these prizes were for effective and transparent implementation of the Mahatma Gandhi National Rural Employment Guarantee Act, The department won the first prize in ‘Transparency and Accountability in Implementation in MGNREGA’ and the second prize in ‘Convergence in MGNREGA’.

To ensure transparency and accountability in Department of Rural Development, all panchayat bank accounts were mapped on the Central Plan Scheme Monitoring System to streamline release of funds from district to panchayats. E-muster rolls were made mandatory to put an end to fake muster rolls and to make the process transparent and fool proof and regular social audits were conducted by gram sabhas. Weekly MGNREGA Diwas was also observed every Wednesday to monitor the quality of work and processes in MGNREGA. Information related to MGNREGA was put in public domain through a management information system. Mishra also made it mandatory for the schemes to be wall painted, photographed and uploaded on a management information system.

For effective convergence with state rural development mission (Jeevika), self-employment and small entrepreneurship scheme as poultry farming, pond management, goat Rearing etc. were allowed to be taken up under MGNREGA. Young professionals with degrees from prestigious institutes like LSE and IRMA were hired to implement state projects under National Rural Livelihood Mission.

Department of Rural Development, under the stewardship of Mishra inked memoranda of understanding with companies to provide training to the youth in state through skill development centres.

To bring about transparency and integrity in implementation of Indira Awas Yojna he came up with the innovative idea of holding block level disbursement camps for beneficiaries of the scheme. These camps were held in front of Ministers and Secretaries in charge of various districts, Divisional Commissioner, District Magistrate and panchayat level public representatives.

In an unprecedented move, Mishra adopted a policy of strict action to ensure people completed construction of their houses within a stipulated time period . Block administration was directed to issue white notices to those failed to complete their houses after two years of getting the first instalment. If the beneficiaries did not take action even after three months of issuance of the white notices, they are again issued red notices.

If he took action against defaulters, Mishra also made sure that he encouraged those who adhered to deadlines. An incentive of Rs. 2000 was announced for Mahadalit beneficiaries who completed their houses within two month of getting their second installment. Madalit families were also given incentives to build toilets in their houses. Much before "Swach Bharat Abhiyan" gained popularity, Mishra took steps to enforce cleanliness by linking payment of final installment to Indira Awas Yojna beneficiaries with construction of toilets.

Mishra also introduced monitoring of Indira Awas Yojna completions through satellite based geotagged and time-stamped photography. This was an unheard of practice in Bihar and unparalleled in Indira Awas Yojna monitoring in the nation.

Mishra facilitated the setting up of online recruitment portal "Samvida" to recruit over 10,000 block and panchayat level staff for looking after Indira Awas Yojna. These recruitments were made in a short period of four months. Project Samvida got national recognition when it won the National Award for e-Governance (gold medal ) in the specific sector award category.

Department of Rural Development under Mishra’s leadership played an active role in setting up Development Management Institute, a state of art management institute in Bihar. This institute has been oriented to create a cadre of development management professionals and enhance competence of existing practitioners.

During Mishra’s tenure as the Minister for Department of Rural Development, Bihar became the first State to publish the draft list of Socio Economic and Caste Census (SECC) and distribute it to the actually surveyed people for putting forth their claims and objection against the draft publication. This was a mammoth task considering the size of population and limitations like delay in release of funds from the GoI(Government of India). Fifty lakh application were received from across the state for redressal of claims and objections in the draft publication which were disposed of in a record time. This SECC data was made available to the Food and Consumer Protection Department, Bihar and thus became the basis of rollout of the Food Security Act in Bihar.

As the Rural Development Minister, Mishra paved the way for creation of a separate cadre of Rural Development Officers and young officers were appointed for all 534 Blocks of Bihar through Bihar Public Service Commission. These officers were provided quality training of governmental rules and regulations, best practices in management and leadership, need for re-engineering governmental process, official etiquette and sensitivity to the needy at Bihar Institute of Public Administration and Rural Development. He also designed a performance appraisal mechanism for the regular and transparent evaluation of these BDO’s across state with the help of Harvard Kennedy School.

=== Performance as Minister, Department of Social Welfare ===
While at the helm of affairs at the Department of Social Welfare, Mishra initiated development of MIS wherein all information related to any Anganwadi Centre and the tagged/covered families was to be put online. An iris based bio-metric identification system for all the beneficiaries of any AWC was also created along with transferring funds directly to them. This process expedited the fund delivery system and reduced scope of any leakage in the process.

=== Performance as Minister of State, Department of Disaster Management ===
As MoS, Department of Disaster Management, Mishra supervised one of nation's biggest rescue and relief operations for over three million people affected by flooding of river Kosi in August 2008. The floods were declared as a national calamity by the then Prime Minister, Manmohan Singh.

Supaul, Madhepura, Araria and Saharsa were the four worst affected districts. Stationing himself at Araria, Mishra personally monitored relief and rescue operations. He used his personal rapport to reach out to NGOs and corporate groups to lend a helping hand to flood affected families. 300 relief camps and mega camps were established where 2155 hand pumps and 3750 temporary toilets were built. 200 health centers and 150 veterinary centers were put in motion.

=== Performance as Minister of State, Department of Sugarcane Development ===
In his debut ministerial role, Mishra displayed business-like acumen in reviving the sick sugarcane sector in Bihar. He conceptualised state’s Sugar Industry Incentive Policy. Within two years of its launch, sugar industry in Bihar staged a turnaround. A privatisation policy was also initiated for 15 sick and closed sugar units in Bihar three of which were successfully privatised during his tenure. Signs of revival of sugar industry became evident as Bihar received proposal worth rupees 20 thousands cores for setting of new sugar complexes. Existing sugar mills witnessed over 40% expansion in production capacity. Mishra ensured that payments worth Rs. 8.84 crores pending in the Bihar State Sugar Corporation since 1997 were also cleared.

== Other posts ==
- Member, Committee on Public Sector Undertakings and Member Public Accounts Committee of Bihar Legislative Assembly (March 2009 – November 2010).
- Member Railway Users Consultative Committee, Ministry of Railways, Govt. of India (2000-2001).
- Member Telecom Advisory Committee, Ministry of Communications, Govt. of India (2000-2001).

== Awards and achievements ==
Mishra was voted as the Pepsi MTV Youth Icon (Young Achievers) 2008. He won this award in a tough competition which had over 8000 national entries. Mishra was also identified as one of the most promising social entrepreneur by Digital Partners a Seattle (USA) based organization for the project on E-Swasthya in Madhubani district of Bihar. He won the prestigious British Foreign and Commonwealth(Chevening) Fellowship in 1997). He has been organising T-20 Annual Rural Cricket Tournament in Madhubani district since 2008. Mishra was also nominated for Fame India-CVoter survey 'Minister no. 1' (मंत्री नं. 1) and voted for rank 2 during his regime as Rural Development and Sugarcane minister in 2013. He has received the India-UK Achievers Honours 2025. The award in the Government and Politics category at a function held in London to mark the achievements of Indian students and alumni of UK institutions.

== Publications ==
Essays in Political Economy – A Global Perspective, New Delhi: Vikas Publishing House, 1998.

External Alienation and Internal Apathy – An Analysis of Bihar’s Backwardness, New Delhi: Vikas Publishing House, 1999.
