= Laukaha Assembly constituency =

Coordinates: 26°33′N 86°27′E

Laukaha
- Constituency No. 40 for the Bihar Legislative Assembly

Constituency details
- Country: India
- Region: East India
- State: Bihar
- District: Madhubani
- Lok Sabha constituency: 7. Jhanjharpur
- Established: 1951
- Total electors: 336,961
- Reservation: None

Member of Legislative Assembly
- 18th Bihar Legislative Assembly
- Incumbent Satish Kumar Sah
- Party: JD(U)
- Alliance: NDA
- Elected year: 2025

Laukaha Assembly constituency is an assembly constituency in Madhubani district in the Indian state of Bihar.

== Overview ==
As per Delimitation of Parliamentary and Assembly constituencies Order, 2008, No. 40 Laukaha Assembly constituency is composed of the following: Laukaha and Laukahi community development blocks; Ekhatha, Bathnaha, Gohumabairia, Saini, Dhanouja, Sugapatti, Kalapatti, Siswar gram panchayats of Phulparas CD Block.

Laukaha Assembly constituency is part of No. 7 Jhanjharpur (Lok Sabha constituency).

== Members of the Legislative Assembly ==
Year	Name	Party
1952	Yogeshwar Ghosh Yadav	Indian National Congress
1957	Ramdulari Shastri	Indian National Congress
1962	Deonarain Gurmaita	Praja Socialist Party
1967	S. Sahu	Indian National Congress
1969	Prayag Lal Yadav	Communist Party of India
1972	Dhanik Lal Mandal	Samyukta Socialist Party
1977	Kuldeo Goit	Indian National Congress
1980	Lal Bihari Yadav	Communist Party of India
1985	Abdul Hai Payami	Indian National Congress
1990	Lal Bihari Yadav	Communist Party of India
1995	Lal Bihari Yadav	Communist Party of India
2000	Hari Prasad Sah	Samata Party
2005	Anis Ahmad	Rashtriya Janata Dal
2005	Hari Prasad Sah	Janata Dal (United)
2010	Hari Prasad Sah	Janata Dal (United)
2015	Lakshmeshwar Roy	Janata Dal (United)
2020	Bharat Bhushan Mandal	Rashtriya Janata Dal
2025	Satish Kumar Sah	Janata Dal (United)

== Election results ==
=== 2025 ===
2025 Bihar Legislative Assembly election: Laukaha
Party	Candidate	Votes	%	±%
JD(U)	Satish Kumar Sah	111,761	48.43	+15.68
RJD	Bharat Bhushan Mandal	86,250	37.37	−0.2
Independent	Ram Lakhan Yadav	7,652	3.32	
JSP	Renu Yadav	4,579	1.98	
Independent	Soman Pandit	3,754	1.63	
BSP	Badri Mukhiya	2,097	0.91	
NOTA	None of the above	5,755	2.49	+0.34
Majority		25,511	11.06	+6.24
Turnout		230,783	68.49	+7.35
JD(U) gain from RJD		Swing	NDA	

=== 2020 ===
2020 Bihar Legislative Assembly election: Laukaha
Party	Candidate	Votes	%	±%
RJD	Bharat Bhushan Mandal	78,523	37.57	
JD(U)	Lakshmeshwar Ray	68,446	32.75	▼10.89
LJP	Pramod Kumar Priyedarshi	30,494	14.59	
PP	Dinesh Gupta	6,319	3.02	
Samajwadi Janata Dal (Democratic)	Alok Kumar Yadav	4,930	2.36	
Independent	Baleshwar Gurmaita	4,703	2.25	
JAP(L)	Lalit Kumar Mahto	2,460	1.18	▼0.01
NOTA	None of the above	4,486	2.15	▼0.41
Majority		10,077	4.82	▼8.18
Turnout		209,006	61.14	▲1.89
RJD gain from JD(U)		Swing		

=== 2015 ===
2015 Bihar Legislative Assembly election: Laukaha
Party	Candidate	Votes	%	±%
JD(U)	Lakshmeshwar Roy	79,971	43.64	
BJP	Pramod Kumar Priyedarshi	56,138	30.64	
SS	Manoj Kumar 'Bihari'	14,455	7.89	
CPI(M)	Rampari Devi	5,393	2.94	
Independent	Dinesh Prasad Sah	4,110	2.24	
SP	Surendra Prasad Yadav	3,856	2.1	
Independent	Bhupinder Prasad Yadav	3,295	1.8	
Independent	Surendra Prasad Suman	2,409	1.31	
JAP(L)	Poonam Goit	2,187	1.19	
BSP	Shakuntala	1,881	1.03	
NOTA	None of the above	4,698	2.56	
Majority		23,833	13.0	
Turnout		183,235	59.25	
