= Satish Kumar Sah =

Indian politician

Member-Bihar Legislative Assembly
- Incumbent
- Assumed office 2025
- Preceded by: Bharat Bhushan Mandal
- Constituency: Laukaha

Personal details
- Party: Janata Dal (United)
- Relations: Hari Prasad Sah (Father)
- Profession: Farmer

Satish Kumar Sah is an Indian politician and a member of the Bihar Legislative Assembly (MLA). He is from the Laukaha of the Madhubani district, Bihar. He studied up to the 8th standard in a school located in Nirmali Supaul. Belonging to the Janata Dal (United) party (JDU), he contested and won the Laukaha assembly constituency general election of Bihar Legislative Assembly in the year 2025.

== Electoral Performance ==
=== 2025 ===
2025 Bihar Legislative Assembly election: Laukaha
Party	Candidate	Votes	%	±%
JD(U)	Satish Kumar Sah	111,761	48.43	
RJD	Bharat Bhushan Mandal	86,250	37.37	
NOTA	None of the above	5,755	2.49	
Majority		25,511		
Turnout		230,783		
JD(U) gain from RJD		Swing	NDA	
