= Katihar Assembly constituency =

Coordinates: 25°32′N 87°35′E

Katihar
- Constituency No. - for the Bihar Legislative Assembly

Constituency details
- Country: India
- Region: East India
- State: Bihar
- District: Katihar
- Established: 1957
- Total electors: 262,016
- Reservation: None

Member of Legislative Assembly
- 18th Bihar Legislative Assembly
- Incumbent Tarkishore Prasad
- Party: BJP
- Alliance: NDA
- Elected year: 2025

Katihar is an assembly constituency in Katihar district in the Indian state of Bihar.

== Overview ==
As per Delimitation of Parliamentary and Assembly constituencies Order, 2008, No 63. Katihar Assembly constituency is composed of the following: Katihar community development block including Katihar nagar nigam; and Hasanganj CD Block. In 2015 Bihar Legislative Assembly election, Katihar will be one of the 36 seats to have VVPAT enabled electronic voting machines.

Katihar Assembly constituency is part of No 11 Katihar (Lok Sabha constituency).

== Members of the Legislative Assembly ==
Year	Name	Party
1957	Babulal Manjhi	Indian National Congress
1957	Sukhdeo Narain Singh	Indian National Congress
1962	Sukhdeo Narain Singh	Indian National Congress
1967	Jagbandhu Adhikari	Bharatiya Jana Sangh
1969	Satya Narain Biswas	Lok Tantrik Congress
1972	Raj Kishore Prasad Singh	Communist Party of India
1977	Jagbandhu Adhikari	Janata Party
1980	Sitaram Chamaria	Indian National Congress
1985	Satya Narayan Prasad	Indian National Congress
1990	Ram Prakash Mahto	Janata Dal
1995	Jagbandhu Adhikari	Bharatiya Janata Party
2000	Ram Prakash Mahto	Rashtriya Janata Dal
2005	Ram Prakash Mahto	Rashtriya Janata Dal
2005	Tarkishore Prasad	Bharatiya Janata Party
2010	Tarkishore Prasad	Bharatiya Janata Party
2015	Tarkishore Prasad	Bharatiya Janata Party
2020	Tarkishore Prasad	Bharatiya Janata Party
2025	Tarkishore Prasad	Bharatiya Janata Party

== Election results ==
=== 2025 ===
2025 Bihar Legislative Assembly election: Katihar
Party	Candidate	Votes	%	±%
BJP	Tar Kishore Prasad	100,255	50.52	+2.05
VIP	Saurabh Agarwal	78,101	39.36	
Independent	Dr. Ram Prakash Mahto	7,411	3.73	
Peoples Party of India (Democratic)	Manisha Kumari	3,253	1.64	
JSP	Dr Ghazi Sharique	2,853	1.44	
NOTA	None of the above	2,178	1.1	+0.64
Majority		22,154	11.16	+4.99
Turnout		198,448	75.74	+13.45
BJP hold		Swing		

=== 2020 ===
2020 Bihar Legislative Assembly election: Katihar
Party	Candidate	Votes	%	±%
BJP	Tar Kishore Prasad	82,669	48.47	+5.49
RJD	Dr. Ram Prakash Mahto	72,150	42.3	
Independent	Md Kalamuddin Ansari	2,533	1.49	
NCP	Rajesh Gurnani	2,173	1.27	−11.0
NOTA	None of the above	787	0.46	−0.28
Majority		10,519	6.17	−3.52
Turnout		170,554	62.29	−0.99
BJP hold		Swing		

=== 2015 ===
2015 Bihar Legislative Assembly election: Katihar
Party	Candidate	Votes	%	±%
BJP	Tarkishore Prasad	66,048	42.98	
JD(U)	Bijay Singh	51,154	33.29	
NCP	Dr. Ram Prakash Mahto	18,856	12.27	
Independent	Jaynandan Paswan	1,801	1.17	
Independent	Samrendra Kunal	1,777	1.16	
NOTA	None of the above	1,139	0.74	
Majority		14,894	9.69	
Turnout		153,667	63.28	

=== 1977 ===
- Jagbandhu Adhikari (JNP): 27,588 votes
- Raj Kishare Prasad Singh (CPI): 6684 votes

=== 1972 ===
- Rajkishor Prasad Singh (CPI): 18,315 votes
- Satya Narayan Biswas (IND): 13,127 votes
- Jagdish Prasad Mandal (Jana Sangh): 10,945 votes
