= Mangani Lal Mandal =

Indian politician

President of Rashtriya Janata Dal of Bihar
- Incumbent
- Assumed office 19 June 2025
- Preceded by: Jagada Nand Singh

Member of Parliament, Lok Sabha
- In office 2009 — 2014
- Preceded by: Devendra Prasad Yadav
- Succeeded by: Birendra Kumar Chaudhary
- Constituency: Jhanjharpur

Personal details
- Born: 1 July 1948 (age 78) Madhubani district, Bihar, India
- Party: Rashtriya Janata Dal

Mangani Lal Mandal (born 1 July 1948) is an Indian politician from the Rashtriya Janata Dal party and a former Member of the Parliament of India representing Jhanjharpur constituency in the Lok Sabha.

Previously, he was a member of Bihar Legislative Council from 1986 to 2004. During this period, he was also a minister in the state cabinet. From 2004 to 2014, he was also a Member of Rajya Sabha.

He left Rashtriya Janta Dal and join Janta Dal (United) during parliyamentry election 2019.
