= Devendra Prasad Yadav =

Indian politician

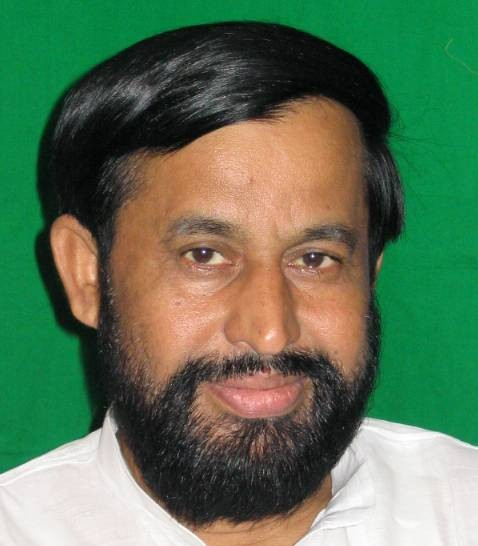
- Yadav in 1989

President of Samajwadi Janata Dal (Democratic)
- In office 2010 – 24 March 2022

Union Minister of Food Union Minister of Civil Supplies, Consumer Affairs and Public Distribution
- In office 1 June 1996 – 21 April 1997
- Prime Minister: H. D. Deve Gowda
- Preceded by: Atal Bihari Vajpayee
- Succeeded by: Inder Kumar Gujral

Union Minister of Commerce
- In office 1 June 1996 – 29 June 1996
- Prime Minister: H. D. Deve Gowda
- Preceded by: Atal Bihari Vajpayee
- Succeeded by: Bolli Bulli Ramaiah

Member of Parliament, Lok Sabha
- In office 13 May 2004 – 16 May 2009
- Preceded by: Surendra Prasad Yadav
- Succeeded by: Mangani Lal Mandal
- Constituency: Jhanjharpur
- In office 2 December 1989 – 3 March 1998
- Preceded by: G. S. Rajhans
- Succeeded by: Surendra Prasad Yadav
- Constituency: Jhanjharpur

Member, Bihar Legislative Assembly
- In office 1977–1980
- Preceded by: Uttam Lal Yadav
- Succeeded by: Surendra Yadav
- Constituency: Phulparas

Personal details
- Born: 26 November 1953 (age 72) Madhubani, Bihar, India
- Party: Rashtriya Janata Dal
- Other political affiliations: Samajwadi Janata Dal Democratic
- Spouse: Sita Devi (m. 1972)
- Children: 4
- Education: R.K. College, Madhubani (Bihar), B.Sc.(Biology)
- Profession: Agriculturist, Social Worker
- As of 25 September, 2006

Devendra Prasad Yadav (born 26 November 1953) is a former member of the 14th Lok Sabha of India. He represented the Jhanjharpur constituency of Bihar and was a member of the Rashtriya Janata Dal, Janata Dal (United) and Janata Dal. He joined Jan Suraaj Party in August 2024.

He was the Secretary of Bihar Janata Party from 1977 to 1979 and was elected to Bihar Legislative Assembly from Phulparas but resigned for Karpoori Thakur who became the Chief Minister of Bihar. He was elected to Bihar Legislative Council and remained from May 1978 to November 1989. He was the National President of Yuva Lok Dal.

He was a Member of Parliament from Jhanjharpur from 1989 to 1998 and from 1999 to 2009. He was Union Cabinet Minister for Food, Civil Supplies, Consumer Affairs, and Public Distribution with an additional charge of Commerce in June 1996 in Deve Gowda ministry and Gujral ministry. During this tenure, he passed the Historical food bill for farmers which is praiseworthy.

He was deputy leader of Janata Dal (United) in Lok Sabha but left soon to join Rashtriya Janata Dal. He formed Samajwadi Janata Dal Democratic after leaving the Rashtriya Janata Dal but soon re-joined Janata Dal (United) by merging his party in it.
