= Samastipur Assembly constituency =

Coordinates: 25°51′39″N 85°46′56″E

Samastipur
- Constituency No. 133 for the Bihar Legislative Assembly

Constituency details
- Country: India
- Region: East India
- State: Bihar
- District: Samastipur
- Lok Sabha constituency: Samastipur
- Established: 1957
- Total electors: 275,257

Member of Legislative Assembly
- 18th Bihar Legislative Assembly
- Incumbent Ashwamedh Devi
- Party: JD(U)
- Alliance: NDA
- Elected year: 2025

Samastipur Vidhan Sabha (assembly) constituency is in Samastipur district in the Indian state of Bihar.

== Overview ==
As per Delimitation of Parliamentary and Assembly constituencies Order, 2008, No. 133 Warisnagar Assembly constituency is composed of the following: Samastipur municipality, Samastipur community development block; and Shahpur Baghauni, Bherokhara, Tajpur, Adharpur and Baghi gram panchayats of Tajpur CD Block. In 2015 Bihar Legislative Assembly election, Samastipur will be one of the 36 seats to have VVPAT enabled electronic voting machines.

Samastipur Assembly constituency is part of No. 23 Samastipur (Lok Sabha constituency).

== Members of the Legislative Assembly ==
Year	Name	Party
1957	Yadunandan Sahay (Note: Samastipur West)	Indian National Congress
1957	Sahdeo Mahato (Note: Samastipur East)	Indian National Congress
1962	Tej Narain Ishwar (Note: Samastipur West)	Indian National Congress
1962	Sahdeo Mahato (Note: Samastipur East)	Indian National Congress
1967	Rajendra Narain Sharma	Samyukta Socialist Party
1969	Rajendra Narain Sharma	Samyukta Socialist Party
1972	Sahdeo Mahato	Indian National Congress
1977	Chandra Shekhar Singh	Janata Party
1980	Karpoori Thakur	Janata Party
1985	Ashok Singh	Lokdal
1990	Ashok Singh	Janata Dal
1995	Ashok Singh	Janata Dal
2000	Ram Nath Thakur	Janata Dal (United)
2005	Ram Nath Thakur	Janata Dal (United)
2005	Ram Nath Thakur	Janata Dal (United)
2010	Akhtarul Islam Sahin	Rashtriya Janata Dal
2015	Akhtarul Islam Sahin	Rashtriya Janata Dal
2020	Akhtarul Islam Sahin	Rashtriya Janata Dal

^by-election

== Election results ==
=== 2025 ===
2025 Bihar Legislative Assembly election: Samastipur
Party	Candidate	Votes	%	±%
JD(U)	Ashwamedh Devi	95,728	48.14	+9.77
RJD	Akhtarul Islam Sahin	81,853	41.16	−0.05
Independent	Chetna Jhamb	6,193	3.11	
JSP	Manoj Kumar Singh	4,938	2.48	
NOTA	None of the above	4,527	2.28	+1.17
Majority		13,875	6.98	+4.14
Turnout		198,865	72.25	+12.7
JD(U) gain from RJD		Swing	{{{swing}}}	

=== 2020 ===
2020 Bihar Legislative Assembly election: Samastipur
Party	Candidate	Votes	%	±%
RJD	Akhtarul Islam Sahin	68,507	41.21	▼13.35
JD(U)	Ashwamedh Devi	63,793	38.37	
LJP	Mahendra Pradhan	12,074	7.26	
Independent	Avinash Kumar	4,053	2.44	
JP	Haroon Gauhar	2,673	1.61	
Independent	Nitesh Kumar Sinha	2,120	1.28	
NOTA	None of the above	1,837	1.11	▲0.4
Majority		4,714	2.84	▼17.71
Turnout		166,240	59.55	▼1.74
RJD hold		Swing		

=== 2015 ===
2015 Bihar Legislative Assembly election: Samastipur
Party	Candidate	Votes	%	±%
RJD	Akhtarul Islam Sahin	82,508	54.56	
BJP	Renu Kumari	51,428	34.01	
Independent	Jitandar Chaudhary	3,054	2.02	
Independent	Ranjan Kishore Sharma	2,131	1.41	
SS	Subhash Prasad Singh	1,872	1.24	
Independent	Avadhesh Kumar	1,780	1.18	
NOTA	None of the above	1,070	0.71	
Majority		31,080	20.55	
Turnout		151,218	61.29	
RJD hold		Swing		

=== 1967 ===
- R. N. Sharma (SSP): 20,976 votes
- S. Mahto (INC): 17,038 votes
