= Jhanjharpur Assembly constituency =

Coordinates: 26°16′N 86°17′E

Jhanjharpur
- Constituency No. - for the Bihar Legislative Assembly

Constituency details
- Country: India
- Region: East India
- State: Bihar
- District: Madhubani
- Established: 1951
- Total electors: 320,142
- Reservation: None

Member of Legislative Assembly
- 18th Bihar Legislative Assembly
- Incumbent Nitish Mishra
- Party: BJP
- Alliance: NDA
- Elected year: 2025
- Preceded by: Gulab Yadav, RJD

Jhanjharpur Assembly constituency is an assembly constituency in Madhubani district in the Indian state of Bihar.

== Overview ==
As per Delimitation of Parliamentary and Assembly constituencies Order, 2008, No. 38 Jhajharpur Assembly constituency is composed of the following: Jhanjharpur and Lakhnaur community development blocks; Pachahi, Parsad, Banki, Bhit Bhagwanpur, Mahasingh Hasauli, Manmohan and Parwalpur gram panchayats of Madhepur CD block.

Jhanjharpur Assembly constituency is part of No. 7 Jhanjharpur (Lok Sabha constituency).

== Members of the Legislative Assembly ==
Year	Name	Party
1952	Kapileshwar Shastri	Indian National Congress
1957	Deochandra Jha	Indian National Congress
1962	Harishchandra Jha	Indian National Congress
1967	Hari Nath Mishra	Indian National Congress
1969	Rampal Chaudhary	Samyukta Socialist Party
1972	Jagannath Mishra	Indian National Congress
1977	Jagannath Mishra	Indian National Congress
1980	Jagannath Mishra	Indian National Congress
1985	Jagannath Mishra	Indian National Congress
1990	Jagannath Mishra	Indian National Congress
1995	Ramawtar Chaudhary	Janata Dal
2000	Jagdish Narayan Chaudhary	Rashtriya Janata Dal
2005	Nitish Mishra	Janata Dal (United)
2005	Nitish Mishra	Janata Dal (United)
2010	Nitish Mishra	Janata Dal (United)
2015	Gulab Yadav	Rashtriya Janata Dal
2020	Nitish Mishra	Bharatiya Janata Party
2025	Nitish Mishra	Bharatiya Janata Party

== Election results ==
=== 2025 ===
Bihar Assembly election, 2025: Jhanjharpur
Party	Candidate	Votes	%	±%
BJP	Nitish Mishra	107,958	55.89	▲3.42
CPI	Ram Narayan Yadav	53,109	27.5	▼1.86
JSP	Keshav Chandra Bhandari	11,563	5.99	
Independent	Krishna Kumar Sahu	4,513	2.34	
AAP	Deo Kant Jha	2,347	1.22	
Independent	Abdul Irfan	1,992	1.03	
NOTA	None of the above	3,112	1.61	▲0.78
Majority		54,849	28.39	▲5.28
Turnout		193,156	60.33	▲3.48
BJP hold		Swing		

=== 2020 ===
Bihar Assembly election, 2020: Jhanjharpur
Party	Candidate	Votes	%	±%
BJP	Nitish Mishra	94,854	52.47	▲12.27
CPI	Ram Narayan Yadav	53,066	29.36	▲26.49
Independent	Ganga Prasad Gangotri	8,658	4.79	
Independent	Madan Kumar Mahto	5,683	3.14	
RLSP	Birendra Kumar Choudhary	3,262	1.8	
Independent	Rakesh Kumar Yadav	2,788	1.54	
Independent	Ganpati Jha	2,671	1.48	
NOTA	None of the above	1,496	0.83	▲0.17
Majority		41,788	23.11	▲22.58
Turnout		180,762	56.85	▲2.51
BJP gain from RJD		Swing		

=== 2015 ===
2015 Bihar Legislative Assembly election: Jhanjharpur
Party	Candidate	Votes	%	±%
RJD	Gulab Yadav	64,320	40.73	
BJP	Nitish Mishra	63,486	40.2	
Independent	Sunil Kumar Jha	7,022	4.45	
CPI	Ram Narayan Yadav	4,531	2.87	
Independent	Sada Nand Suman	4,237	2.68	
Independent	Om Prakash	3,309	2.1	
Independent	Ram Narayan Mahto	2,639	1.67	
Independent	Mohammad Hasnaian	1,593	1.01	
NOTA	None of the above	1,044	0.66	
Majority		834	0.53	
Turnout		157,914	54.34	
RJD gain from JD(U)		Swing		
