= Deo Nath Yadav =

Indian politician

Deo Nath Yadav is an Indian politician and member of the Samajwadi Party. Yadav was a member of the Bihar Legislative Assembly from the Phulparas constituency in Madhubani district.
