= Ashwamedh Devi =

Indian politician

Ashwamedha Devi
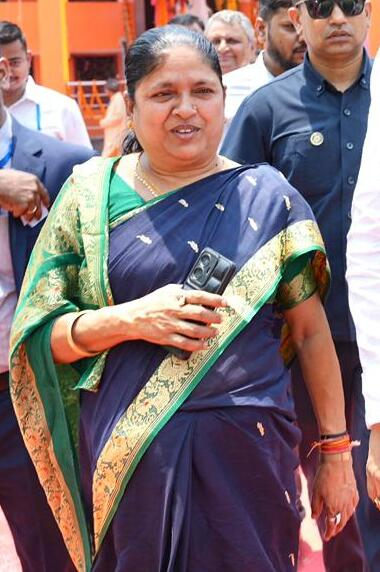

Former Member of Parliament
- Constituency: Ujjiyarpur

Chairperson of Bihar State women commission
- Incumbent
- Assumed office July 2023

Member of Bihar Legislative Assembly
- In office 2000–2005

Member of Bihar Legislative Assembly
- In office 2005–2009

Personal details
- Born: 18 September 1967 (age 58)
- Party: Janata Dal (United) (JD(U))
- Spouse: Late Pradip Mahto
- Profession: Agriculturist, Politician

Ashwamedh Devi (born 18 September 1967) is a politician and a Member of Parliament elected from the Ujiarpur constituency in the Indian state of Bihar being a Janata Dal (United) candidate. Devi has also served as Member of Bihar Legislative Assembly from Kalyanpur, Samastipur Assembly constituency. In 2023, she was appointed the Chairperson of Bihar State Commission for Women by Government of Bihar. In 2025, she was again elected to Bihar Legislative Assembly. She represented Samastipur Assembly constituency this time.

== Early life ==
Ashwamedh was born on 18 September 1967 in Meyari, district Samastipur (Bihar). She married Pradip Mahto on 7 May 1979 and has four sons.

== Education ==
Ashwamedh Devi is Matriculate, Bajitpur Meyari, Sarai Ranjan, Samastipur, Bihar.

== Political career ==
She was elected as a member of Bihar Vidhan Sabha in 2000 and 2005 from Kalyanpur, Samastipur Assembly constituency.

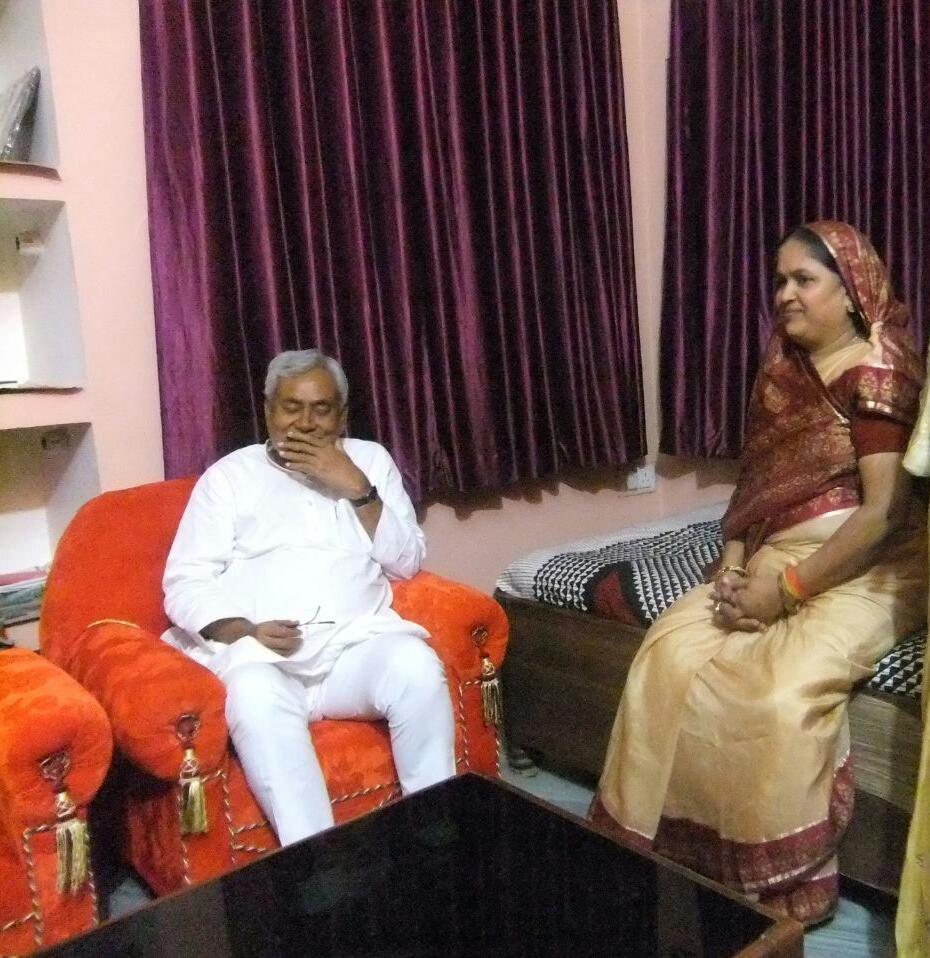
Devi with Bihar's former Chief Minister Nitish Kumar.

She remained as a member till 2009. In the year 2009, she was elected as a member of the 15th Lok Sabha. In 2023, she was appointed the head of State Commission for Women for the state of Bihar. Besides her, there were seven members in the reconstituted commission, which was formed to look after the issues related to women in state.

Devi was Janata Dal (United) candidate from Samastipur Assembly constituency in 2025 elections to Bihar Legislative Assembly. She successfully defeated her opponent Akhtarul Islam Shahin with a margin of over 13,000 votes and was elected to Bihar Legislative Assembly.
