= Lal Bihari Yadav (Bihar politician) =

Indian politician

Member of the Bihar Legislative Assembly
- In office 1990–2000
- Preceded by: Abdul Hai Payami
- Succeeded by: Hari Prasad Sah
- Constituency: Laukaha
- In office 1980–1985
- Preceded by: Kuldeo Goit
- Succeeded by: Abdul Hai Payami

Personal details
- Born: Madhubani, Bihar
- Party: Communist Party of India
- Occupation: Agriculturist
- Profession: Politician

Lal Bihari Yadav was an Indian politician and a member of Bihar Legislative Assembly of India. He represented the Laukaha constituency in Madhubani district of Bihar. Yadav was elected in the 1980, 1990 and 1995 elections to the Bihar Assembly as a member of Communist Party of India.
