= Ram Prakash Mahto =

Indian politician

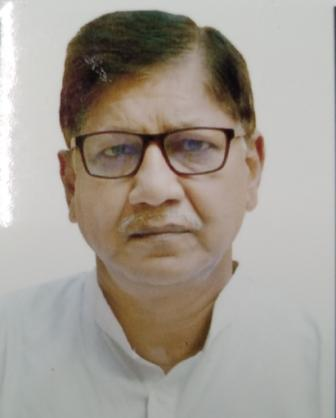

Member of the Bihar Legislative Assembly
- In office 1990–1995
- Succeeded by: Tarkishore Prasad
- Constituency: Katihar
- In office 2000–2005

Personal details
- Party: Rashtriya Janata Dal; Janata Dal (United)

Ram Prakash Mahto is an Indian politician from the state of Bihar. He has represented the Katihar legislative assembly constituency in Bihar Vidhan Sabha. Mahto is a member of Rashtriya Janata Dal but he has also been a member of Nationalist Congress Party and Janata Dal in past.

== Political career ==
Mahto started his political career in 1990. He was a member of Janata Dal. In election to Bihar Legislative Assembly, Mahto defeated Jagbandhu Adhikari of Bhartiya Janata Party and reached Vidhan Sabha for the first time. He continued his winning streak and won the assembly elections from Katihar constituency in year 2000. After this victory, he was made a cabinet minister in the government of Rashtriya Janata Dal. He was allotted the portfolio of education ministry. In 2005, though Rashtriya Janata Dal won the elections once again but government couldn't be formed and Mahto also lost his seat to Tarkishore Prasad of Bhartiya Janata Party.
