= Dhanik Lal Mandal =

Indian politician (1932–2022)

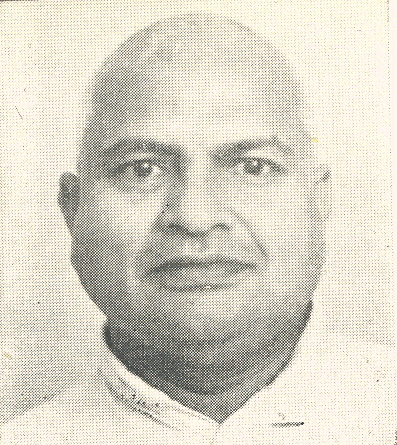

Governor of Haryana
- In office 7 February 1990 -13 June 1995
- Preceded by: Hari Anand Barari
- Succeeded by: Mahaveer Prasad

Member of Parliament, Lok Sabha
- In office 1977-1984
- Preceded by: Jagannath Mishra
- Succeeded by: G.S. Rajhans
- Constituency: Jhanjharpur, Bihar

Personal details
- Born: 30 March 1932 Belha village, Darbanga, Bihar, British India
- Died: 13 November 2022 (aged 90)
- Party: Janata Party
- Children: Bharat Bhushan Mandal

Dhanik Lal Mandal (30 March 1932 – 13 November 2022) was an Indian politician from Bihar. He was elected to the Lok Sabha from Jhanjharpur in Bihar, twice in 1977 and 1980. He was a member of the Bihar Legislative Assembly (1967–74) and also a speaker of the Bihar Legislative Assembly, (1967–69).

Mandal remained the Governor of Haryana (7 Feb 1990–13 June 1995). After his election to the 6th Lok Sabha in 1977, he remained Minister of State, Union Ministry of Home Affairs (1977–79) in the Morarji Desai Ministry.

Mandal was born at Belha Village, Madhubani district, and attended Northbrook District School, Darbhanga, Mithila College, Darbhanga, and Allahabad University. He died on 13 November 2022, at the age of 90. He was a member of Extremely Backward Dhanuk caste of Bihar.

== See also ==
- List of governors of Haryana
