= Paswan (surname) =

This is a list of notable people who bear the name Paswan. There is also an Indian caste that uses the name and surname.

== Politicians ==
=== Chief Ministers & Union Ministers ===
- Bhola Paswan Shastri, three-time Chief Minister of Bihar
- Chirag Paswan, Union Cabinet Minister of Food Processing Industries and President of Lok Janshakti Party (Ram Vilas)
- Ram Vilas Paswan, former Union Cabinet Minister and Padma Bhushan awardee
- Sanjay Paswan, former Minister of State for Human Resource Development and former Member of Parliament from Nawada

=== Members of Parliament ===
- Brahmadev Anand Paswan, former Member of the Rajya Sabha
- Chhedi Paswan, former Member of Parliament from Sasaram and former Member of the Bihar Legislative Assembly from Chenari
- Kamlesh Paswan, Member of Parliament from Bansgaon
- Kedar Paswan, former Member of Parliament from Rosera
- Pitambar Paswan, former Member of the Rajya Sabha and former Member of Parliament
- Ram Bhagat Paswan, former Member of Parliament from Rosera
- Ram Chandra Paswan, former Member of Parliament from Samastipur
- Subhawati Paswan, former Member of Parliament from Bansgaon
- Sukdeo Paswan, former Member of Parliament from Araria
- Virchandra Paswan, former Member of Parliament from Nawada

=== Members of State Legislative Assemblies ===
- Amar Kumar Paswan, former Member of the Bihar Legislative Assembly from Bochahan
- Bilat Paswan Vihangam, writer, former Member of the Bihar Legislative Assembly and Padma Shri awardee
- Chandrabhanu Paswan, Member of the Uttar Pradesh Legislative Assembly from Milkipur
- Janardan Paswan, Member of the Jharkhand Legislative Assembly from Chatra
- Kameshwar Paswan, former Member of the Bihar Legislative Assembly and former minister in the Government of Bihar
- Krishna Paswan, former Member of the Uttar Pradesh Legislative Assembly from Khaga
- Krishnanandan Paswan, Member of the Bihar Legislative Assembly from Harsidhi
- Lakhendra Paswan, Member of the Bihar Legislative Assembly from Patepur
- Lalan Paswan, former Member of the Bihar Legislative Assembly from Chenari
- Mahesh Paswan, Member of the Bihar Legislative Assembly from Agiaon
- Musafir Paswan, former Member of the Bihar Legislative Assembly from Bochahan
- Om Prakash Paswan, former Member of the Uttar Pradesh Legislative Assembly
- Ram Prit Paswan (Indian politician), former Member of the Bihar Legislative Assembly from Rajnagar and former minister in the Government of Bihar
- Rameshwar Paswan, former Member of the Bihar Legislative Assembly from Sikandra
- Suresh Paswan, Member of the Jharkhand Legislative Assembly from Deoghar
- Upendra Paswan, former Member of the Bihar Legislative Assembly from Bakhri
- Vimlesh Paswan, former Member of the Uttar Pradesh Legislative Assembly from Bansgaon

=== Politicians from Nepal ===
- Ram Prit Paswan (Nepalese politician), Nepalese politician and former Deputy Chairperson of the National Assembly of Nepal

=== Other Politicians ===
- Hari Kewal Prasad, four-time Member of Parliament from Salempur
- Maheshwar Hazari, former Member of Parliament, former Deputy Speaker of the Bihar Legislative Assembly and former minister in the Government of Bihar
- Pashupati Kumar Paras, former Union Cabinet Minister and former Member of Parliament
- Prince Raj, former Member of Parliament from Samastipur
