= Warisnagar Assembly constituency =

Coordinates: 25°56′11″N 85°52′16″E

Warisnagar
- Constituency No. 132 for the Bihar Legislative Assembly

Constituency details
- Country: India
- Region: East India
- State: Bihar
- District: Samastipur
- Established: 1951
- Total electors: 324,904

Member of Legislative Assembly
- 18th Bihar Legislative Assembly
- Incumbent Manjarik Mrinal
- Party: JD(U)
- Alliance: NDA
- Elected year: 2025

Warisnagar is an assembly constituency in Samastipur district in the Indian state of Bihar. The candidates of Rashtriya Janata Dal used to win from this constituency in earlier elections, but from 2010 onwards, the candidates of Janata Dal (United) started winning from here. This assembly seat has influence of members of Koeri and Kurmi who are descisive in ensuring victory of a candidate.

== Overview ==
As per Delimitation of Parliamentary and Assembly constituencies Order, 2008, No. 132 Warisnagar Assembly constituency is composed of the following: Warisnagar and Khanpur community development blocks; and Madhurapur, Rahtauli, Dahiyar Ranna, Parsa, Bhataura and Dumra Mohan gram panchayats of Shivaji Nagar CD Block.

Warisnagar Assembly constituency is part of No. 23 Samastipur (Lok Sabha constituency).

== Members of the Legislative Assembly ==
| Year | Name | Party |
|---|---|---|
| 1952 | Vashisht Narain Singh | Socialist Party |
| 1952 | Dhanpati Paswan | Socialist Party |
| 1967 | Ram Sewak Hazari | Samyukta Socialist Party |
| 1969 | Ram Sewak Hazari | Samyukta Socialist Party |
| 1972 | Chulhai Ram | Indian National Congress |
| 1977 | Pitambar Paswan | Janata Party |
| 1980 | Pitambar Paswan | Janata Party |
| 1985 | Ram Sewak Hazari | Independent politician |
| 1990 | Pitambar Paswan | Janata Dal |
| 1995 | Pitambar Paswan | Janata Dal |
| 1996^ | Bhikhar Baitha | Janata Dal |
| 2000 | Ram Sewak Hazari | Janata Dal (United) |
| 2005 | Maheshwar Hazari | Lok Janshakti Party |
| 2005 | Maheshwar Hazari | Lok Janshakti Party |
| 2009^ | Vishwanath Paswan | Lok Janshakti Party |
| 2010 | Ashok Kumar | Janata Dal (United) |
| 2015 | Ashok Kumar | Janata Dal (United) |
| 2020 | Ashok Kumar | Janata Dal (United) |
| 2025 | Manjarik Mrinal | Janata Dal (United) |

^by-election

== Election results ==
=== 2025 ===
2025 Bihar Legislative Assembly election: Warisnagar
| Party | Candidate | Votes | % | ±% |
|---|---|---|---|---|
| JD(U) | Manjarik Mrinal | 108,968 | 46.41 | ▲10.44 |
| CPI(ML)L | Phoolbabu Singh | 74,532 | 31.75 | ▲3.04 |
| JSP | Satya Narayan Sahani | 13,081 | 5.57 | |
| Independent | Abhinav Raj | 7,255 | 3.09 | |
| Independent | Zahid Iqbal | 5,430 | 2.31 | |
| RLJP | Govind Kumar | 4,178 | 1.78 | |
| AAP | Upendra Prasad Roy | 3,591 | 1.53 | |
| Hindustani Awam Manch (United) | Chandan Kumar | 3,130 | 1.33 | |
| Independent | Dr. Mahesh Prasad | 2,710 | 1.15 | |
| Independent | Dilip Roy | 2,568 | 1.09 | |
| NOTA | None of the above | 5,605 | 2.39 | ▲1.0 |
| Majority | | 34,436 | 14.66 | ▲7.4 |
| Turnout | | 234,783 | 72.26 | ▲13.29 |
| JD(U) hold | | Swing | | |

=== 2020 ===
Bihar Assembly election, 2020: Warisnagar
| Party | Candidate | Votes | % | ±% |
|---|---|---|---|---|
| JD(U) | Ashok Kumar | 68,356 | 35.97 | −18.68 |
| CPI(ML)L | Phoolbabu Singh | 54,555 | 28.71 | |
| LJP | Urmila Sinha | 23,928 | 12.59 | −7.53 |
| RLSP | B. K. Singh | 7,932 | 4.17 | |
| Independent | Dilep Roy | 5,465 | 2.88 | |
| Independent | Ramesh Kumar Ray | 3,805 | 2.0 | |
| JAP(L) | Md. Naushad | 3,527 | 1.86 | +0.95 |
| Independent | Tanveer Ahmad | 3,044 | 1.6 | |
| The Plurals Party | Kriti King | 1,955 | 1.03 | |
| Bhartiya Sablog Party | Vinay Kumar | 1,772 | 0.93 | |
| NOTA | None of the above | 2,632 | 1.39 | −4.24 |
| Majority | | 13,801 | 7.26 | −27.27 |
| Turnout | | 190,030 | 58.97 | −1.15 |
| JD(U) hold | | Swing | | |

=== 2015 ===
2015 Bihar Legislative Assembly election: Warisnagar
| Party | Candidate | Votes | % | ±% |
|---|---|---|---|---|
| JD(U) | Ashok Kumar | 92,687 | 54.65 | |
| LJP | Chandrashekhar Rai | 34,114 | 20.12 | |
| NOTA | n/a | 9,551 | 5.63 | |
| Independent | B. K. Singh | 9,109 | 5.37 | |
| Independent | Vijay Kumar Rai | 7,844 | 4.63 | |
| CPI | Premnath Mishra | 2,479 | 1.46 | |
| SS | Chandra Bhushan Kumar | 2,300 | 1.36 | |
| BMP | Arun Kumar | 1,914 | 1.13 | |
| BSP | Md. Ishakh | 1,599 | 0.94 | |
| JMM | Shiv Shankar Mahto | 1,546 | 0.91 | |
| JAP(L) | Ashok Prasad Verma | 1,539 | 0.91 | |
| NOTA | None of the above | 9,551 | 5.63 | |
| Majority | | 58,573 | 34.53 | |
| Turnout | | 169,594 | 60.12 | |

=== 2010 ===
2010 Bihar Legislative Assembly election: Warisnagar
| Party | Candidate | Votes | % | ±% |
|---|---|---|---|---|
| JD(U) | Ashok Kumar | 46,245 | 33.96 | |
| RJD | Gajendra Prasad Singh | 26,745 | 19.64 | |
| Independent | B.K.Singh | 13,195 | 9.69 | |
| Independent | Ram Vilash Mahto | 8,597 | 6.31 | |
| CPI | Ram Chandra Mahto | 8,481 | 6.23 | |
| Independent | Wasim Raja | 7,916 | 5.81 | |
| INC | Vijay Kumar Roy | 7,059 | 5.18 | |
| Turnout | | 136,177 | 55.81 | |
| Registered electors | | 244,018 | | |
