= Raghunath Pandey =

Indian politician

Member of the Legislative Assembly for Muzaffarpur
- In office 1980–1995
- Preceded by: Manjay Lal
- Succeeded by: Vijendra Chaudhary
- Constituency: Muzaffarpur

Personal details
- Born: March 8, 1922
- Died: September 24, 2001 (aged 79)
- Party: Indian National Congress
- Occupation: Politician; Businessperson

Raghunath Pandey (March 8, 1922 – September 24, 2001) was an Indian politician and businessperson from Muzaffarpur, Bihar. He served as the Member of the Legislative Assembly in Muzaffarpur from 1980 to 1995 by Indian National Congress ticket. Pandey lost the 1991 general elections from Muzaffarpur to George Fernandes. He filed a case in Patna High Court and finally he won but till then the Parliament was dissolved. He again lost in the 1995 assembly elections.

Pandey served as the chairman of Muzaffarpur Municipality for ten years. He also served as a minister in Satyendra Narayan Sinha's cabinet. Prior to entering politics, he had several businesses in Muzaffarpur including transport and cinema halls. Pandey setup several colleges including Sri Krishna Medical College and Hospital and Homoeopathic Medical College & Hospital in the city.
