= Rosera Lok Sabha constituency =

Former constituency of the Indian parliament in Bihar

Coordinates: 25.8°N 86.0°E

Rosera
- Former Lok Sabha constituency

Constituency details
- Country: India
- Region: East India
- State: Bihar
- Established: 1952
- Abolished: 2008
- Reservation: SC

Rosera was a Lok Sabha constituency in Bihar, India.

== Assembly segments ==
No. 16 Rosera (रोसड़ा / रोसरा) Parliamentary Constituency was composed of the following assembly segments in 2004:

- Ghanshyampur
- Baheri
- Warisnagar
- Rosera
- Singhia
- Hasanpur

== Members of Lok Sabha ==
Year	Member	Party
1952	Rameshwar Sahu	Indian National Congress
1962	Rameshwar Sahu	Indian National Congress
1967	Kedar Paswan	Samyukta Socialist Party
1971	Ram Bhagat Paswan	Indian National Congress
1977	Ram Sewak Hazari	Janata Party
1980	Baleshwar Ram	Indian National Congress
1984	Ram Bhagat Paswan	Indian National Congress
1989	Dasai Chowdhary	Janata Dal
1991	Ram Vilas Paswan	Janata Dal
1996	Pitambar Paswan	Rashtriya Janata Dal
1998	Pitambar Paswan	Rashtriya Janata Dal
1999	Ram Chandra Paswan	Janata Dal (United)
2004	Ram Chandra Paswan	Lok Janshakti Party

- 2008 Onwards: Does not exist. See: Samastipur (Lok Sabha constituency)

== Detailed Results ==
=== 2004 ===
2004 Indian general election: Rosera (SC)
Party	Candidate	Votes	%	±%
LJP	Ram Chandra Paswan	394,240	55.23	
JD(U)	Dasai Chowdhary	255,829	35.84	▼22.27
CPI(ML)L	Lal Bahadur Sada	18,829	2.64	▲1.60
IND	Halchal Ram	16,820	2.36	
SP	Satrudhan Kumar Paswan	6,584	0.92	
BSP	Sanatan Kumar Sathi	5,128	0.72	▲0.11
AD(K)	Gulab Paswan	4,960	0.69	
IND	Nandjee Ram	4,959	0.69	
IND	Kripanath Ram	3,406	0.48	
SS	Kedar Paswan	3,043	0.43	
Majority		138,411	19.39	▼0.36
Turnout		713,798		
LJP gain from JD(U)		Swing		

=== 1999 ===
1999 Indian general election: Rosera (SC)
Party	Candidate	Votes	%	±%
JD(U)	Ram Chandra Paswan	420,564	58.11	
RJD	Pitamber Paswan	277,648	38.36	▲0.33
BJC	Raja Ram Das	7,812	1.08	
CPI(ML)L	Laxami Narain Sada	7,507	1.04	
BSP	Vidyanand Ram	4,383	0.61	
LSP	Suresh Ram	3,186	0.44	
IND	Nand Kumar Das	2,614	0.36	
Majority		142,916	19.75	▲13.43
Turnout		734,151	68.15	▲3.41
JD(U) gain from RJD		Swing		

=== 1998 ===
1998 Indian general election: Rosera (SC)
Party	Candidate	Votes	%	±%
RJD	Pitambar Paswan	260,492	38.03	
SAP	Ram Sewak Hazari	217,211	31.71	▼3.26
JD	Ram Chandra Paswan	197,138	28.78	▼26.72
LS	Jai Prakash Narain Paswan	10,153	1.48	
Majority		43,281	6.32	▼14.21
Turnout		697,586	64.74	▲7.54
RJD gain from JD		Swing		

=== 1996 ===
1996 Indian general election: Rosera (SC)
Party	Candidate	Votes	%	±%
JD	Pitambar Paswan	332,376	55.50	▼6.80
SAP	Upendra Paswan	209,445	34.97	
INC	Ram Bhagat Paswan	45,076	7.53	▼11.35
IND	Braj Bala Ram	3,102	0.52	
IND	Ram Bahadur Sada	2,737	0.46	
IND	Nakshtra Ram	1,848	0.31	
IND	Dilip Kumar	1,417	0.24	
IND	Ram Balak Ram	1,279	0.21	
IND	Bhola Mochi	907	0.15	
IND	Rama Ram	681	0.11	
Majority		122,931	20.53	▼22.89
Turnout		606,085	57.20	▼5.95
JD hold		Swing		

=== 1991 ===
1991 Indian general election: Rosera (SC)
Party	Candidate	Votes	%	±%
JD	Ram Vilas Paswan	373,710	62.30	
INC	Ashok Kumar	113,226	18.88	
BJP	Kameshwar Chaupal	104,956	17.50	
JP	Mahesh Kumar	1,707	0.28	
IND	Ram Vinod Paswan	1,067	0.18	
IND	Kampani Pas.	998	0.17	
IND	Ram Prasad Paswan	872	0.15	
IND	Kamal Paswan	754	0.13	
SOP(L)	Rajesh Kumar Rajak	652	0.11	
IND	Sikandar Vihari	643	0.11	
IND	Kailash Paswan	344	0.06	
IND	Bhola Paswan	215	0.04	
LKD	Sitaram Hazari	191	0.03	
IND	Kamal Ram	160	0.03	
DDP	Bunnilal Ram	131	0.02	
IND	Nanda Paswan	115	0.02	
IND	Janak Ram	94	0.02	
Majority		260,484	43.42	
Turnout		610,619	63.15	
JD hold		Swing		

=== 1989 ===
1989 Indian general election: Rosera (SC)
Party	Candidate	Votes	%	±%
JD	Dashai Chaudhary	394,291	63.62	
INC	Ram Bhagat Paswan	189,804	30.63	
IND	Ram Sewak Hazari	18,320	2.96	
IND	Ram Prassad Paswan	5,095	0.82	
DDP	Raha Ram	3,494	0.56	
LKD(B)	Siheswar Manjhi	3,054	0.49	
IND	Nand Kishore Mahto	1,392	0.22	
IND	Kameshwar Paswan	1,365	0.22	
IND	Udesh Baitha	1,000	0.16	
IND	Asharfi Mochi	972	0.16	
IND	Nanda Paswan	955	0.15	
Majority		204,487	32.99	
Turnout		626,036	64.88	
JD gain from INC		Swing		

=== 1984 ===
1984 Indian general election: Rosera (SC)
Party	Candidate	Votes	%	±%
INC	Ram Bhagat Paswan	268,848	57.78	
LKD	Ram Sewak Hazari	171,630	36.89	
IND	Tul Mohan Ram	8,774	1.89	
IND	Kedar Paswan	7,856	1.69	
IND	Bunni Lal Ram	4,201	0.90	
IND	Ram Prasad Paswan	3,030	0.65	
IND	Choudhary Lakshmi Narain	972	0.21	
Majority		97,218	20.89	
Turnout		472,110	58.38	
INC hold		Swing		

=== 1980 ===
1980 Indian general election: Rosera (SC)
Party	Candidate	Votes	%	±%
INC(I)	Baleshwar Ram	222,607	48.04	
JP(S)	Ram Sewak Hazari	203,212	43.85	
JP	Yogeshwar Paswan	30,211	6.52	
IND	Shankar Choudhary	3,138	0.68	
IND	Bhandari Paswan	2,580	0.56	
IND	Rama Ram	1,678	0.36	
Majority		19,395	4.19	
Turnout		468,253	62.95	
INC(I) gain from JP		Swing		

=== 1977 ===
1977 Indian general election: Rosera (SC)
Party	Candidate	Votes	%	±%
JP	Ram Sewak Hazari	311,240	70.70	
INC	Ram Bhagat Paswan	116,734	26.52	
IND	Tulmohan Ram	7,694	1.75	
IND	Sitaram Hazari	4,549	1.03	
Majority		194,506	44.18	
Turnout		445,605	69.07	
JP gain from INC		Swing		

=== 1971 ===
1971 Indian general election: Rosera (SC)
Party	Candidate	Votes	%	±%
INC	Ram Bhagat Paswan	103,429	42.66	
SSP	Ramsewak Hazari	71,722	29.58	
CPI	Ram Jatan Paswan	53,866	22.22	
IND	Rameshwar Sahu	6,011	2.48	
IND	Ayodhya Sada	2,606	1.07	
IND	Lali Paswan	1,544	0.64	
IND	Kedar Paswan	1,389	0.57	
IND	Ratan Devi	1,267	0.52	
BKD	Thakai Paswan	595	0.25	
Majority		31,707	13.08	
Turnout		245,755	42.57	
INC gain from SSP		Swing		

=== 1967 ===
1967 Indian general election: Rosera (SC)
Party	Candidate	Votes	%	±%
SSP	K. Paswan	124,908	44.65	
INC	R. Sahu	113,520	40.58	
ABJS	A. Kumar	26,283	9.40	
PSP	S. Choudhary	15,036	5.37	
Majority		11,388	4.07	
Turnout		292,428	57.24	
SSP gain from INC		Swing		

=== 1962 ===
1962 Indian general election: Rosera (SC)
Party	Candidate	Votes	%	±%
INC	Rameshwar Sahu	122,921	69.06	
Socialist	Kedar Paswan	55,076	30.94	
Majority		67,845	38.12	
Turnout		185,973	43.05	
INC hold		Swing		
