= Baheri, Bihar Assembly constituency =

Coordinates: 25°57′25″N 86°02′31″E

Baheri
- Former constituency for the Bihar Legislative Assembly

Constituency details
- Country: India
- Region: East India
- State: Bihar
- District: Darbhanga
- Lok Sabha constituency: Rosera
- Established: 1977
- Abolished: 2010

Baheri Assembly constituency was an assembly constituency in Darbhanga district in the Indian state of Bihar.

As a consequence of the orders of the Delimitation Commission of India, Baheri Assembly constituency ceased to exist in 2010.

It was part of Rosera Lok Sabha constituency.

== Results ==
=== 1977-2005 ===
In the October 2005 and February 2005 state assembly elections, Hare Krishna Yadav of RJD won the Baheri assembly seat defeating his nearest rival Narendra Kumar Singh of JD(U) and Mohan Choudhary of LJP respectively. Contests in most years were multi cornered but only winners and runners are being mentioned. Ramanand Singh of JD(U) defeated Hare Krishna Yadav of RJD in 2000. Ram Lakhan Yadav of JD defeated Mohan Choudhary of Congress in 1995. Mohan Choudhary of Congress defeated Ram Lakhan Yadav, Independent, in 1990. Premanand Thakur of Congress defeated Ramanand Singh of LD in 1985. Rama Kant Jha of Congress defeated Ram Lakhan Yadav of Janata Party (Secular – Charan Singh) in 1980. Tej Narayan Yadav of JP defeated Kumar Kalyan Jha of CPI in 1977.
