= Ashok Kumar (disambiguation) =

Ashok Kumar (1911–2001) was an Indian actor.

Ashok Kumar may also refer to:

== Sports ==
- Ashok Kumar (golfer) (born 1983), Indian golfer
- Ashok Kumar (field hockey) (born 1950), former Indian field hockey player
- Ashok Kumar Garg (born 1969), Indian Olympic wrestler
- Ashok Kumar (wrestler, born 1959), Indian Olympic wrestler

== Politics ==
- Ashok Kumar (police officer), Indian Police Service officer
- Ashok Kumar (British politician) (1956–2010), British Labour politician
- Ashok Kumar (Rosera politician) (born 1948), Indian National Congress Party politician
- Ashok Kumar (Jammu and Kashmir politician) (born 1958), Indian National Congress Party politician
- Ashok Kumar (Pakistani politician)
- Ashok Kumar (Warisnagar politician), from Warisnagar, Bihar, India
- Ashok Kumar, Rashtriya Janata Dal politicial, better known as Ashok Kushwaha

== Other ==
- Ashok Kumar (Tamil actor) (born 1981), Tamil actor
- Ashok Kumar (Telugu actor), Telugu actor known for comedian roles
- Ashok Kumar (cinematographer) (1941–2014), Indian cinematographer
- S. Ashok Kumar (1947–2009), Indian judge
- Ashok Kumar (soldier), Pakistan Army soldier
- Ashok Kumar (film), a 1941 Tamil-language film
- "Ashok Kumar", an Indian placeholder name similar to John Doe

== See also ==
- Ashok Kumar Singh (disambiguation)
