= Singhia Assembly constituency =

Coordinates: 25°50′02″N 86°09′26″E

Singhia
- Former constituency for the Bihar Legislative Assembly

Constituency details
- Country: India
- Region: East India
- State: Bihar
- District: Samastipur
- Lok Sabha constituency: Rosera
- Established: 1977
- Abolished: 2010

Singhia Assembly constituency was an assembly constituency in Samastipur district in the Indian state of Bihar.

As a consequence of the orders of the Delimitation Commission of India, Singhia Assembly constituency ceased to exist in 2010.

It was part of Rosera Lok Sabha constituency.

== Results ==
=== 1977-2005 ===
In the October 2005 Bihar Assembly elections, Dr. Ashok Kumar of Congress won the Singhia seat defeating his nearest rival Ram Sewak Hazari of LJP. Dr. Ashok Kumar of Congress defeated Ramotar Paswan, Independent, in February 2005 and Jagdish Paswan of JD(U) in 2000. Jagdish Paswan of JD defeated Dr. Ashok Kumar of Congress in 1995. Dr. Ashok Kumar of Congress defeated Jagdish Paswan of JD in 1990 and Ramjatan Paswan of CPI in 1985. Ramjatan Paswan of CPI defeated Jagdish Paswan, Independent, in 1980 and Laxmi Paswan, Independent, in 1977.

== See also ==
- Singhia, Samastipur
