= Hayaghat Assembly constituency =

Coordinates: 25°59′31″N 85°56′06″E

Hayaghat
- Constituency No. 84 - for the Bihar Legislative Assembly

Constituency details
- Country: India
- Region: East India
- State: Bihar
- District: Darbhanga
- Established: 1967
- Total electors: 253,557
- Reservation: None

Member of Legislative Assembly
- 18th Bihar Legislative Assembly
- Incumbent Ramchandra Prasad Singh
- Party: BJP
- Alliance: NDA
- Elected year: 2025

Hayaghat is an assembly constituency in Darbhanga district in the Indian state of Bihar.

== Overview ==
As per Delimitation of Parliamentary and Assembly constituencies Order, 2008, No. 84 Hayaghat Assembly constituency is composed of the following: Hayaghat community development block; Athar North, Athar South, Baligaon, Bhachhi, Bithauli, Chakwa Bharwari, Dhanauli, Gangdah Shivram, Gujrauli Ramauli, Harhacha, Hathauri North, Hathauri South, Jorja, Mithunia, Nimaithi, Paghari, Susari Turki and Thathopur of Baheri CD Block.

Hayaghat Assembly constituency is part of No. 23 Samastipur (Lok Sabha constituency) (SC).

== Members of the Legislative Assembly ==
Year	Name	Party
1967	Baleshwar Ram	Indian National Congress
1969	Baleshwar Ram	Indian National Congress
1972	Baleshwar Ram	Indian National Congress
1977	Anirudh Prasad	Janata Party
1980	Madan Mohan Choudhary	Indian National Congress (I)
1985	Umadhar Prasad Singh	Independent
1990	Kafil Ahmad Kaifi	Janata Dal
1995	Hari Nandan Yadav	Janata Dal
2000	Umadhar Prasad Singh	Independent
2005	Hari Nandan Yadav	Rashtriya Janata Dal
2005	Hari Nandan Yadav	Rashtriya Janata Dal
2010	Amarnath Gami	Bharatiya Janata Party
2015	Amarnath Gami	Janata Dal (United)
2020	Ramchandra Prasad	Bharatiya Janata Party
2025	Ramchandra Prasad	Bharatiya Janata Party

== Election results ==
=== 2025 ===
Bihar Legislative Assembly Election, 2025: Hayaghat
Party	Candidate	Votes	%	±%
BJP	Ramchandra Prasad	77,222	45.68	−1.18
CPI(M)	Shyam Bharti	65,383	38.68	
JSP	Pratibha Singh	5,759	3.41	
Independent	Mohammad Mahtab Alam	3,667	2.17	
Independent	Probhendra Jha	3,578	2.12	
Independent	Lakshmi Das	2,379	1.41	
AAP	Ravindra Nath Singh	1,922	1.14	
NOTA	None of the above	2,767	1.64	−0.83
Majority		11,839	7.0	−0.17
Turnout		169,035	66.67	+7.57
BJP hold		Swing		

=== 2020 ===
Bihar Legislative Assembly Election, 2020: Hayaghat
Party	Candidate	Votes	%	±%
BJP	Ramchandra Prasad	67,030	46.86	
RJD	Bhola Yadav	56,778	39.69	
JAP(L)	Abdus Salam Khan	4,898	3.42	
Independent	Ravindra Nath Singh	4,575	3.2	
Independent	Geeta Devi	1,729	1.21	
NOTA	None of the above	3,534	2.47	−3.9
Majority		10,252	7.17	−19.81
Turnout		143,051	59.1	+3.06
BJP gain from JD(U)		Swing		

=== 2015 ===
Bihar Assembly election, 2015: Hayaghat
Party	Candidate	Votes	%	±%
JD(U)	Amar Nath Gami	65,677	53.32	
LJP	Ramesh Chaudhary	32,446	26.34	
SS	Ram Shankar Choudhary	4,084	3.32	
Independent	Sumitra Paswan	3,669	2.98	
Independent	Hem Chandra Singh	1,862	1.51	
Independent	Basant Kumar Mandal	1,731	1.41	
BSP	Puran Paswan	1,179	0.96	
NOTA	None of the above	7,844	6.37	
Majority		33,231	26.98	
Turnout		123,180	56.04	
