= Bochahan Assembly constituency =

Coordinates: 26°07′N 85°31′E

Bochahan
- Constituency No. - for the Bihar Legislative Assembly

Constituency details
- Country: India
- Region: East India
- State: Bihar
- District: Muzaffarpur
- Established: 1957
- Total electors: 286,053

Member of Legislative Assembly
- 18th Bihar Legislative Assembly
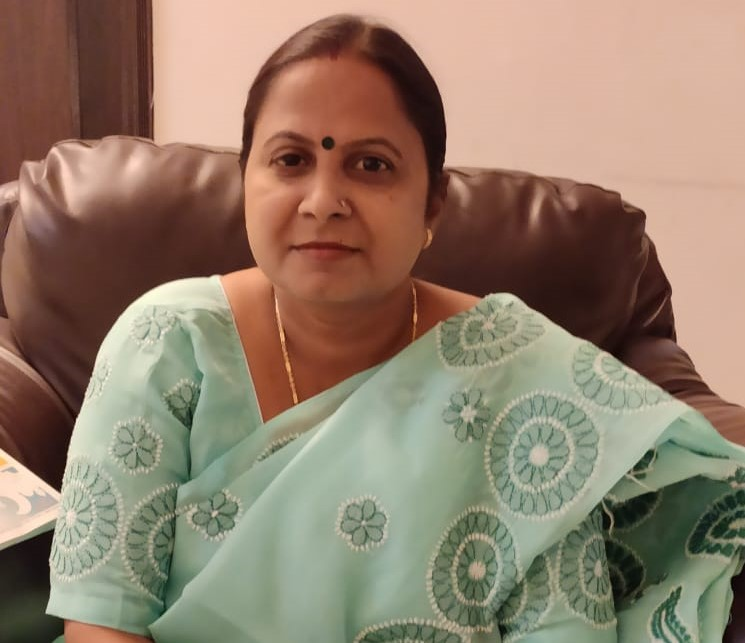
- Incumbent Baby Kumari
- Party: LJP(RV)
- Alliance: NDA
- Elected year: 2025

Bochahan Assembly constituency is an assembly constituency in Muzaffarpur district in the Indian state of Bihar. It is reserved for scheduled castes. Bochahan Assembly constituency is part of No. 15 Muzaffarpur (Lok Sabha constituency).

== Overview ==
As per Delimitation of Parliamentary and Assembly constituencies Order, 2008, No. 91 Bochahan Assembly constituency (SC) is composed of the following: Adi Gopalpur, Balthi Rasulpur, Bhootane, Deogan, Karanpur North, Karanpur South, Lohsari, Maidapur, Majhauli, Sahila Rampur, Sarfuddinpur, Unsar and Vishunpur Jagdish gram panchayats of Bochahan community development block; Abdul Nagar Urf Madhopur, Baikatpur, Barajagannath, Bhikhanpur, Chhapra Megh, Dumri, Jamalabad, Jhapahan, Kanauli Vishundutta, Khabra, Manika Harikesh, Manika Vishunpur Chand, Mushahri Alias Radha Nagar, Narauli, Prahladpur, Rajwara Bhagwan, Rohua, Sahbazpur, Shekhpur, Sherpur, Susta and Taraura Gopalpur gram panchayats of Mushahri CD Block.

== Members of the Legislative Assembly ==
Year	Name	Party
1967	Sitaram Rajak	Samyukta Socialist Party
1969	Sitaram Rajak	Samyukta Socialist Party
1972	Ramai Ram	Hindustani Shoshit Dal
1977	Kamal Paswan	Janata Party
1980	Ramai Ram	Janata Party
1985	Ramai Ram	Lok Dal
1990	Ramai Ram	Janata Dal
1995	Ramai Ram	Janata Dal
2000	Ramai Ram	Rashtriya Janata Dal
2005	Ramai Ram	Rashtriya Janata Dal
2005	Ramai Ram	Rashtriya Janata Dal
2009^	Musafir Paswan	Rashtriya Janata Dal
2010	Ramai Ram	Janata Dal (United)
2015	Baby Kumari	Independent
2020	Musafir Paswan	Vikassheel Insaan Party
2022^	Amar Paswan	Rashtriya Janata Dal
2025	Baby Kumari	Lok Janshakti Party (Ram Vilas)

^by-election

== Election results ==
From 1957 to 1962m this constituency was known as Muzzafarnagar Muffasil (Constituency number 63). Contests in most years were multi-cornered but only winners and runners up are mentioned. Ramai Ram representing RJD defeated Shiv Nath Chaudhary of JD(U) in October 2005 and February 2005, and Musafir Paswan representing JD(U) in 2000. Ramai Ram of JD defeated Musafir Paswan representing SAP in 1995 and Ram Pratap Niraj of Congress in 1990. Ramai Ram of LD defeated Hari Lal Ram of Congress in 1985. Ramai Ram of Janata Party (JP) defeated Righan Ram of CPI in 1980. Kamal Paswan of JP defeated Hari Lal Ram of Congress in 1977.

=== 2025 ===
Bihar Assembly election, 2025: Bochahan
Party	Candidate	Votes	%	±%
LJP(RV)	Baby Kumari	108,186	49.43	
RJD	Amar Kumar Paswan	87,870	40.15	+3.70
JSP	Umesh Kumar Rajak	5,255	2.40	
BVP	Rajgeer Paswan	3,812	1.74	+0.57
Independent	Deepmala Devi	2,928	1.34	
AAP	Dr. Abhay Kumar	2,731	1.25	
RJP	Jaymangal Ram	2,280	1.04	
NOTA	None of the above	3,815	1.74	−0.19
Majority		20,316	9.28	+3.11
Turnout		218,853	76.51	+11.34
LJP(RV) gain from RJD		Swing		

=== 2022 ===
2022 By-election: Bochahan
Party	Candidate	Votes	%	±%
RJD	Amar Kumar Paswan	82,562	48.52	▲12.07
BJP	Baby Kumari	45,909	26.98	New
VIP	Geeta Kumari	29,279	17.21	▼24.51
INC	Tarun Chaudhary	1,336	0.79	New
Majority		36,653	21.54	▲15.25
Turnout		1,82,689	65.19	
RJD gain from VIP		Swing		

=== 2020 ===
Bihar Assembly election, 2020: Bochahan
Party	Candidate	Votes	%	±%
VIP	Musafir Paswan	77,837	42.62	
RJD	Ramai Ram	66,569	36.45	
LJP	Amar Azad	8,232	4.51	▲0.08
BMP	Rajesh Kumar	3,772	2.07	▲0.36
Independent	Rudal Ram	3,398	1.86	
Independent	Deep Lal Ram	3,260	1.79	
Independent	Uday Chaudhary	2,948	1.61	▲0.09
RJJP	Sanju Devi	2,641	1.45	
Independent	Jai Chandra Ram	2,353	1.29	
BVP	Rajgeer Paswan	2,143	1.17	
BSP	Lal Babu Paswan	1,809	0.99	▲0.35
NOTA	None of the above	3,523	1.93	▼0.63
Majority		11,268	6.17	▼8.32
Turnout		182,633	65.17	▼0.31
VIP gain from Independent		Swing	▲42.62	

=== 2015 ===
2015 Bihar Legislative Assembly election: Bochahan
Party	Candidate	Votes	%	±%
Independent	Baby Kumari	67,720	40.67	
JD(U)	Ramai Ram	43,590	26.18	
SS	Lal Babu Paswan	11,877	7.13	
LJP	Anil Kumar	7,383	4.43	
SP	Musafir Paswan	5,130	3.08	
Independent	Sanju Devi	5,017	3.01	
CPI(ML)L	Ramnandan Paswan	4,080	2.45	
Independent	Sunita Kumar	3,609	2.17	
BMP	Jaynath	2,847	1.71	
Independent	Uday Chaudhary	2,531	1.52	
KS	Vivek	2,447	1.47	
Akhil Bharatiya Hind Kranti Party	Rajendra Kumar	2,144	1.29	
Sarvajan Kalyan Loktantrik Party	Deeplal Ram	1,837	1.1	
NOTA	None of the above	4,259	2.56	
Majority		24,130	14.49	
Turnout		166,492	65.48	
Independent gain from JD(U)		Swing	+40.67	

=== 2010 ===
2010 Bihar Legislative Assembly election: Bochahan
Party	Candidate	Votes	%	±%
JD(U)	Ramai Ram	61,885	50.58	+13.69
RJD	Musafir Paswan	37,758	30.86	−11.22
INC	Baby Kumari	5,289	4.32	+4.32
Majority		24,127	19.72	
Turnout		1,22,340	61.08	
JD(U) gain from RJD		Swing	+13.69	

=== 2005 ===
October 2005 Bihar Legislative Assembly election: Bochahan
Party	Candidate	Votes	%	±%
RJD	Ramai Ram	46,861	42.08	−3.32
JD(U)	Shiv Nath	41,081	36.89	+7.11
LJP	Awdhesh Paswan	8,340	7.49	−2.04
Majority		5780	5.19	
Turnout		1,11,357		
RJD gain from		Swing	-3.32	

=== 2000 ===
2000 Bihar Legislative Assembly election: Bochahan
Party	Candidate	Votes	%	±%
RJD	Ramai Ram	77,031	62.93	+62.93
JD(U)	Musafir Paswan	22,863	18.68	+18.68
SAP	Reejhan Ram Paswan	14,589	11.92	−12.78
CPI(ML)L	Ram Nandan Paswan	3,989	3.26	+3.26
Majority		54,168	44.25	
Turnout		1,22,416	67.57	
RJD gain from JD		Swing	+62.93	

=== 1995 ===
1995 Bihar Legislative Assembly election: Bochahan
Party	Candidate	Votes	%	±%
JD	Ramai Ram	74,273	65.19	+0.23
SAP	Musafir Paswan	28,147	24.7	+24.7
Majority		46,126	40.49	
Turnout		1,13,938	66.89	
JD gain from SAP		Swing	+0.23	

=== 1990 ===
1990 Bihar Legislative Assembly election: Bochahan
Party	Candidate	Votes	%	±%
JD	Ramai Ram	66,280	64.97	+64.97
INC	Ram Pratap Niraj	27,854	27.3	−0.97
Majority		38,426	37.67	
Turnout		1,02,014	66.23	
JD gain from LKD		Swing	+64.97	

=== 1985 ===
1985 Bihar Legislative Assembly election: Bochahan
Party	Candidate	Votes	%	±%
LKD	Ramai Ram	20,303	31.96	+31.96
INC	Hari Lal Ram	17,996	28.33	+9.52
CPI	Rijhan Ram	16,589	26.11	+2.38
Majority		38,426	37.67	
Turnout		63,528	49.0	
LKD gain from JP		Swing	+31.96	

=== 1980 ===
1980 Bihar Legislative Assembly election: Bochahan
Party	Candidate	Votes	%	±%
JP	Ramai Ram	17,663	30.48	−34.37
INC	Raghubir Prasad	10,898	18.81	−3.08
CPI	Rijhan Ram	13,752	23.73	+23.73
JP(S)	Kamal Paswan	13,514	23.32	+23.32
Majority		3,911	6.75	
Turnout		57,950	48.38	
JP gain from CPI		Swing	-34.37	

=== 1977 ===
1977 Bihar Legislative Assembly election: Bochahan
Party	Candidate	Votes	%	±%
JP	Kamal Paswan	32,030	64.85	+64.85
INC	Hari Lal Ram	10,810	21.89	+4.47
Independent	Ramai Ram	4,006	8.11	+8.11
Majority		21,220	6.75	
Turnout		49,392	42.96	
JP gain from INC		Swing	+64.85	

=== 1972 ===
1972 Bihar Legislative Assembly election: Bochahan
Party	Candidate	Votes	%	±%
Hindustani Shoshit Dal	Ramai Ram	13,531	31.86	+31.86
Independent	Hari Lal Ram	12,798	30.13	+30.13
INC	Sitaram Rajak	7,442	17.52	−12.06
ABJS	Sai Jangi Paswan	5,869	13.82	
Majority		733	0.73	
Turnout		42,476	43.28	
Hindustani Shoshit Dal gain from INC		Swing		

=== 1969 ===
1969 Bihar Legislative Assembly election: Bochahan
Party	Candidate	Votes	%	±%
SSP	Sitaram Rajak	19,042	48.76	+4.89
INC	Chandramani Lal Chowdhury	11,374	29.12	+0.15
Majority		7,668	19.64	
Turnout		39,049	46.10	
SSP gain from INC		Swing		

=== 1967 ===
1967 Bihar Legislative Assembly election: Bochahan
Party	Candidate	Votes	%	±%
SSP	Sitaram Rajak	18,049	43.85	
INC	Chandramani Lal Chowdhury	11,927	28.97	
Majority		6,122	14.88	
Turnout		41,157	50.33	
SSP gain from INC		Swing		
