= Kalyanpur, Samastipur Assembly constituency =

Coordinates: 25°56′18″N 85°46′56″E

Kalyanpur
- Constituency No. 131 for the Bihar Legislative Assembly

Constituency details
- Country: India
- Region: East India
- State: Bihar
- District: Samastipur
- Lok Sabha constituency: Samastipur
- Established: 1967
- Reservation: SC

Member of Legislative Assembly
- 18th Bihar Legislative Assembly
- Incumbent Maheshwar Hazari
- Party: JD(U)
- Alliance: NDA
- Elected year: 2020
- Preceded by: Manju Kumari JD(U)

Kalyanpur is an assembly constituency in Samastipur district in the Indian state of Bihar. The seat is reserved for scheduled castes.

== History ==
In this constituency, the contest for political representation used to be in between the members of Koeri and Bhumihar caste until 2010, when the constituency was reserved for the Schedule Castes. The reservation of the constituency led to dilution of the caste based mobilisation of the candidates from the two castes. However, the political history of the constituency shows that for most of the times, this constituency has elected a legislator belonging to Koeri caste. The legislators belonging to the Koeri caste are Brahmdeo Narain Singh, Sita Sinha, Ashok Prasad Verma and Ashwamedh Devi among others.

== Overview ==
As per Delimitation of Parliamentary and Assembly constituencies Order, 2008, No. 131 Kalyanpur Assembly constituency is composed of the following: Kalyanpur and Pusa community development blocks.

Kalyanpur Assembly constituency (SC) is part of No. 23 Samastipur (Lok Sabha constituency).

== Members of the Legislative Assembly ==
Year	Name	Party
1967	Brahmdeo Narain Singh	Samyukta Socialist Party
1969	Brahmdeo Narain Singh	Samyukta Socialist Party
1972	Ram Naresh Trivedi	Indian National Congress
1977	Bashistha Narayan Singh	Janata Party
1980	Ram Sukumari Devi	Indian National Congress
1985	Bashistha Narayan Singh	Lokdal
1990	Dilip Kumar Rai	Indian National Congress
1995	Sita Sinha	Janata Dal
2000	Ashwamedh Devi	Samata Party
2005	Ashok Prasad Verma	Rashtriya Janata Dal
2005	Ashwamedh Devi	Janata Dal (United)
2009^	Ashok Prasad Verma	Rashtriya Janata Dal
2010	Ram Sewak Hazari	Janata Dal (United)
2013^	Manju Kumari	Janata Dal (United)
2015	Maheshwar Hazari	Janata Dal (United)
2020	Maheshwar Hazari	Janata Dal (United)
2025	Maheshwar Hazari	Janata Dal (United)

== Election results ==
=== 2025 ===
2025 Bihar Legislative Assembly election: Kalyanpur, Samastipur
Party	Candidate	Votes	%	±%
JD(U)	Maheshwar Hazari	118,162	49.3	+10.84
CPI(ML)L	Ranjeet Kumar Ram	79,576	33.2	+0.2
JSP	Ram Balak Paswan	16,574	6.92	
Independent	Rajeev Kumar	5,631	2.35	
BSP	Ratneshwar Ram	3,805	1.59	
Independent	Mantesh Kumar	3,193	1.33	
SUCI(C)	Madhu Krishanji Ram	2,497	1.04	
NOTA	None of the above	8,634	3.6	−0.07
Majority		38,586	16.1	+10.64
Turnout		239,675	73.76	+15.83
JD(U) hold		Swing		

=== 2020 ===
2020 Bihar Legislative Assembly election: Kalyanpur, Samastipur
Party	Candidate	Votes	%	±%
JD(U)	Maheshwar Hazari	72,279	38.46	−11.94
CPI(ML)L	Ranjeet Kumar Ram	62,028	33.0	
LJP	A Mona Prasad Sundeshwar Ram	23,163	12.32	−15.71
Rashtriya Jan Vikas Party	Umesh Das	4,329	2.3	
Yuva Krantikari Party	Sanjay Das	3,875	2.06	
Aam Janmat Party	Anamika	3,723	1.98	
SS	Shatrudhan Paswan	3,303	1.76	+0.78
Independent	Shiv Nath Sharan	2,734	1.45	
Bhartiya Sablog Party	Pramila Devi	2,019	1.07	
JAP(L)	Mantesh Kumar	1,961	1.04	
NOTA	None of the above	6,899	3.67	+0.7
Majority		10,251	5.46	−16.91
Turnout		187,938	57.93	+0.53
JD(U) hold		Swing		

=== 2015 ===
2015 Bihar Legislative Assembly election: Kalyanpur, Samastipur
Party	Candidate	Votes	%	±%
JD(U)	Maheshwar Hazari	84,904	50.4	
LJP	Prince Raj	47,218	28.03	
Independent	Binod Das	9,098	5.4	
Independent	Shankar Paswan	5,627	3.34	
Independent	Prem Kumar Paswan	4,057	2.41	
BSP	Abhay Kumar	2,502	1.49	
CPI(ML)L	Jibachh Paswan	1,766	1.05	
SS	Ram Balak Paswan	1,646	0.98	
NCP	Renu Raj	1,586	0.94	
National Janta Party (Indian)	Santosh Kumar Paswan	1,554	0.92	
NOTA	None of the above	4,999	2.97	
Majority		37,686	22.37	
Turnout		168,470	57.4	
