= Baleshwar Ram =

Member of Parliament, Lok Sabha
- In office 1980-1984
- Preceded by: Ram Sewak Hazari
- Succeeded by: Ram Bhagat Paswan
- Constituency: Rosera, Bihar

Member of Bihar Legislative Assembly
- In office 1952–1957
- Constituency: Hasanpur

Member of Bihar Legislative Assembly
- In office 1957–1967
- Preceded by: Devaki Nandan Jha
- Succeeded by: Y. K. Chaudhary
- Constituency: Dalsinghsarai

Member of Bihar Legislative Assembly
- In office 1967–1977
- Preceded by: Constituency established
- Succeeded by: Nagendra Jha
- Constituency: Hayaghat

Personal details
- Born: 7 March 1928 Samartha, Darbhanga district, Bihar and Orissa Province, British India
- Died: 3 May 2015 (aged 87) Samartha, Samastipur, Bihar, India
- Party: Indian National Congress
- Spouse: Chinta Devi
- Children: 4 including, Dr. Ashok Kumar

Baleshwar Ram (1928-2015) was an Indian politician, seven-times MLA and former Union Minister of State from Bihar.

== Early life ==
Baleshwar Ram was born to Batahu Ram into a Dalit family at Samartha vill., Darbhanga district, Bihar and Odisha Province, British India (now Samastipur distt. Bihar).

He was married to Chinta Devi and they have four children. His son, Dr. Ashok Kumar (Ashok Ram) is a doctor, six-times elected MLA and president of BPPC.

== Political career ==
Ram joined INC and fought his first in 1952 from Hasanpur constituency. He again got elected in 1957 from Dalsinghsarai and in 1962 from Dalsinghsarai West constituency. In 1963 he became Minister of Tourism.

In 1967 Bihar elections he fought successfully from Hayaghat constituency and was re-elected from same seat in 1969 and 1972. He became Minister of Information and Broadcasting in Harihar Singh govt.

In 1980, he became member of Parliament of India from Rosera constituency in Bihar. He was given the portfolio of Union Minister of State for Agriculture and Rural Development.

Ram became Parliamentary Secretary in Bihar govt. He also served as Chairman, Board of Trustees of Ravidas Ashram, General Secretary of State Committee of Dalit Varg Sangh, I.P.S.O. of Bihar and Vice President Indo-Soviet Cultural Society (Bihar).
