= Ramai Ram =

Indian politician (1944–2022)

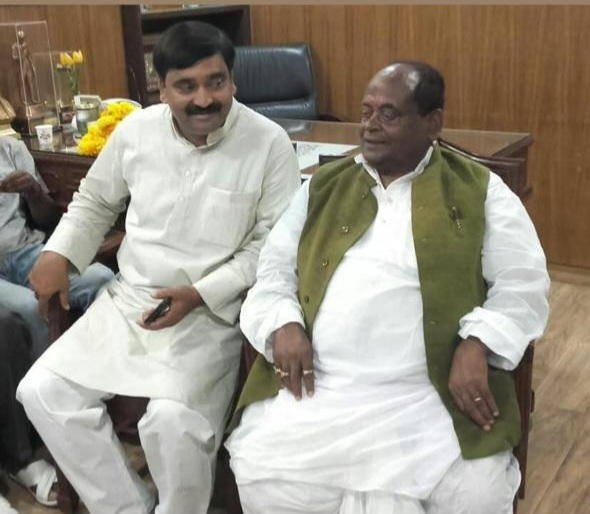
- Ram with Zubair Ahmad Quraishi

Member of Bihar Legislative Assembly
- In office 2010–2015
- Preceded by: Musafir Paswan
- Succeeded by: Baby Kumari
- In office 1980–2009
- Preceded by: Kamal Paswan
- Succeeded by: Musafir Paswan
- In office 1972–1977
- Preceded by: Sitaram Rajak
- Succeeded by: Kamal Paswan
- Constituency: Bochahan

Minister of Land and Revenue Government of Bihar
- In office February 2005 – October 2005
- Chief Ministers: Lalu Prasad Yadav; Nitish kumar
- Constituency: Bochahan

Minister of Transport Government of Bihar
- In office 1980–2000
- Chief Ministers: Lalu Prasad Yadav; Rabri Devi
- Constituency: Bochahan

Personal details
- Born: 1 January 1944 Muzaffarpur, Bihar Province, British India
- Died: 14 July 2022 (aged 78) Patna, Bihar, India
- Party: Loktantrik Janata Dal
- Other political affiliations: Janata Dal (U); Janata Dal; Lok Dal; Janata Party; VIP; Rashtriya Janata Dal
- Profession: Politician

Ramai Ram (1 January 1944 - 14 July 2022) was an Indian politician from Bihar. He was a prominent Dalit leader. He was associated with many political parties in his 50 year long political career; Janta Paty, Rashtriya Janta Dal, Janata Dal(United) and VIP. He was nine times MLA from Bochahan constituency of Muzaffarpur district in Bihar.

He served as Minister of Land and Revenue in the leadership of Lalu Prasad Yadav.

== Personal life ==
Ramai Ram was born to Kisuni Ram at Muzaffarpur, Bihar into a Dalit family.

His daughter, Geeta Kumari was appointed as a member of the State Transport Authority when he was Transport Minister and later she became MLC from Bihar. His other daughter, Rekha Devi was also MLC in Bihar.

He died at Medanta Hospital in Kankarbagh, Patna on 14 July 2022 at the age of 78.

== Politics ==
- In 1972 he won for the first time from Bochahan constituency as an independent candidate. He joined Janata Party in 1980 and won from same seat.
- He again won Bochahan constituency in 1985 from Lok Dal and in 1990 & 1995 from Janata Dal.
- In 2000 he joined RJD and won from Bochahan and again in 2005. He became president of Bihar Rashtriya Janata Dal when Lalu Yadav was in jail.
- He left RJD and joined JDU in 2009 along with his daughter, Geeta Kumari. In 2010 he was again elected from Bochahan constituency.
- He was Bihar Land Reforms and Revenue Minister in Rabri Devi's government from 1999 to 2005 and in first Nitish Kumar govt.
- In 2009 he joined Congress and fought Indian general elections from Gopalganj Lok Sabha constituency.
- He was Transport Minister in Jitan Ram Manjhi's government and became President of Bihar Janata Dal (U) in 2017.
- Ram left JDU and was made state president of Loktantrik Janata Dal. Later he re-joined RJD in 2017.
- He was member of national executive team of RJD

== Controversies ==
- He was criticized for appointing his daughter a non-official as member of State Transport Authority.
- He was reported under Human Rights Commission for harassing his domestic help.
- In 2012 he was attacked by a councillor of Muzaffarpur for unknown reasons.
- He was suspended from JDU under Sharad Yadav along with 21 other leaders for anti-party activities.
- He demanded separate country, Harijanistan (land for Dalits) after loss of Dalit lives in April 2018 caste protests in India.
