= Gamio =

Gamio is a surname. Notable people with the surname include:

- Manuel Gamio (1883–1960), Mexican anthropologist, archaeologist, and sociologist
- Pedro José Rada y Gamio (1873–1938), Peruvian politician

== See also ==
- Gami (disambiguation)
