= Ashok Kumar Singh =

Ashok Kumar Singh may refer to:

- Ashok Kumar Singh (Ramgarh), Indian politician and member of the Bihar Legislative Assembly, representing the Ramgarh Assembly constituency
- Ashok Kumar Singh (Paroo politician), Indian politician and member of the Bihar Legislative Assembly, representing the Paroo Assembly constituency
- Ashok Kumar (field hockey) (born 1950), Indian field hockey player

== See also ==
- Ashok Kumar (disambiguation)
