= Muzaffarpur Assembly constituency =

Coordinates: 26.12°N 85.4°E

Muzaffarpur
- Constituency No. 94 for the Bihar Legislative Assembly

Constituency details
- Country: India
- Region: East India
- State: Bihar
- District: Muzaffarpur
- Established: 1957
- Total electors: 316,880
- Reservation: None

Member of Legislative Assembly
- 18th Bihar Legislative Assembly
- Incumbent Ranjan Kumar
- Party: BJP
- Alliance: NDA
- Elected year: 2025

Muzaffarpur is an assembly constituency in Muzaffarpur district in the Indian state of Bihar. In 2015 Bihar Legislative Assembly election, Muzaffarpur was one of the 36 seats to have VVPAT enabled electronic voting machines.

== Extent ==
As per Delimitation of Parliamentary and Assembly constituencies Order, 2008, No. 94 Muzaffarpur Assembly constituency is composed of the following: Muzaffarpur municipal corporation and Bhagwanpur, Madhubani, Majhauli Khetal and Patahi gram panchayats of Musahari community development block.

Muzaffarpur Assembly constituency is part of No. 15 Muzaffarpur (Lok Sabha constituency).

== Members of the Legislative Assembly ==
| Year | Name | Party |
|---|---|---|
| 1957 | Mahamaya Prasad Sinha | Praja Socialist Party |
| 1962 | Devnandan Sahay | Indian National Congress |
| 1967 | M. L. Gupta | Indian National Congress |
| 1969 | Ramdev Sharma | Communist Party of India |
| 1972 | Ramdev Sharma | Communist Party of India |
| 1977 | Manjay Lal | Janata Party |
| 1980 | Raghunath Pandey | Indian National Congress |
| 1985 | Raghunath Pandey | Indian National Congress |
| 1990 | Raghunath Pandey | Indian National Congress |
| 1995 | Bijendra Chaudhary | Janata Dal |
| 2000 | Bijendra Chaudhary | Rashtriya Janata Dal |
| 2005 | Bijendra Chaudhary | Independent politician |
| 2005 | Bijendra Chaudhary | Independent politician |
| 2010 | Suresh Kumar Sharma | Bharatiya Janata Party |
| 2015 | Suresh Kumar Sharma | Bharatiya Janata Party |
| 2020 | Bijendra Chaudhary | Indian National Congress |
| 2025 | Ranjan Kumar | Bharatiya Janata Party |

== Election results ==
=== 2025 ===
2025 Bihar Legislative Assembly election: Muzaffarpur
| Party | Candidate | Votes | % | ±% |
|---|---|---|---|---|
| BJP | Ranjan Kumar | 100,477 | 53.43 | +8.99 |
| INC | Bijendra Chaudhary | 67,820 | 36.06 | −12.1 |
| JSP | Dr. A.k. Das | 10,173 | 5.41 | |
| NOTA | None of the above | 606 | 0.32 | −0.41 |
| Majority | | 32,657 | 17.37 | +13.65 |
| Turnout | | 188,071 | 59.35 | +6.64 |
| BJP gain from INC | | Swing | NDA | |

=== 2020 ===
2020 Bihar Legislative Assembly election: Muzaffarpur
| Party | Candidate | Votes | % | ±% |
|---|---|---|---|---|
| INC | Bijendra Chaudhary | 81,871 | 48.16 | |
| BJP | Suresh Kumar Sharma | 75,545 | 44.44 | −10.69 |
| The Plurals Party | Pallavi Sinha | 3,522 | 2.07 | |
| JAP(L) | Ravi Atal | 1,552 | 0.91 | |
| NOTA | None of the above | 1,245 | 0.73 | +0.27 |
| Majority | | 6,326 | 3.72 | −13.43 |
| Turnout | | 170,011 | 52.71 | −5.48 |
| INC gain from BJP | | Swing | | |

=== 2015 ===
2015 Bihar Legislative Assembly election: Muzaffarpur
| Party | Candidate | Votes | % | ±% |
|---|---|---|---|---|
| BJP | Suresh Kumar Sharma | 95,594 | 55.13 | |
| JD(U) | Bijendra Chaudhary | 65,855 | 37.98 | |
| SP | Sayed Majid Hussain | 1,719 | 0.99 | |
| NOTA | None of the above | 800 | 0.46 | |
| Majority | | 29,739 | 17.15 | |
| Turnout | | 173,389 | 58.19 | |
