= Dasai Chowdhary =

Indian politician

Deputy Minister of Health and Family Welfare
- In office 10 November 1990 – 21 June 1991
- Prime Minister: Chandra Shekhar

Member of Parliament, Lok Sabha
- In office 2 December 1989 – 13 March 1991
- Preceded by: Ram Chandra Paswan
- Succeeded by: Ram Vilas Paswan
- Constituency: Rosera

Member of Bihar Legislative Assembly
- In office 22 February 2000 – 3 February 2005
- Preceded by: Munsilal Paswan
- Succeeded by: Shiv Chandra Ram
- Constituency: Mahua
- In office 31 May 1980 – 27 February 1990
- Preceded by: Phudeni Prasad
- Succeeded by: Munsilal Paswan
- Constituency: Mahua

Personal details
- Born: Dasai Chowdhary; 9 June 1953 (age 73) Hussainakhurd, Vaishali District, Bihar
- Party: Jan Suraaj Party
- Other political affiliations: Janata Party; Lok Dal; Janata Dal; Rashtriya Janata Dal; Janata Dal (United); Bharatiya Janata Party

Dasai Chowdhary (born 9 June 1953) is an Indian politician. He was elected to the Lok Sabha, the lower house of the Parliament of India from the Rosera in Bihar as a member of the Janata Dal, whilst also previously serving as a multiple-time member of the Bihar Legislative Assembly from Mahua, representing various parties. He is currently a member of the Jan Suraaj Party.
