= Sita Sinha =

Indian politician

Sita Sinha (also known as Sita Sinha Kushwaha) is an Indian politician and former member of Bihar Legislative Assembly. She was elected to Bihar Legislative Assembly in 1995 on the symbol of Janata Dal.

== Life ==
Sinha was a member of Janata Dal and she was active in the Samastipur district of Bihar. She was a member of Koeri caste, which is distributed throughout the Kalyanpur, Samastipur Assembly constituency. Sinha won the 1995 Assembly elections in the constituency which frequently saw political contest between Koeris and Bhumihars. She was also once associated with Janata Dal (United). However, she left the party citing indiscipline and lack of scope for devoted political workers in the party. In her resignation letter she also accused JDU of being a B-Team of Rashtriya Janata Dal.

Sinha was also associated with Rashtriya Janata Dal and she was a minister in Government of Bihar in RJD's government. She was made the minister for social welfare and also served as a member of social welfare board. She later joined Bharatiya Janata Party.

In 2020, she was made the director of Rashtriya Ispat Nigam limited, a public sector company of Government of India working in steel sector.
