= Brahmdeo Narain Singh Kushwaha =

Indian politician

Brahmdeo Narain Singh also known as Brahmdeo Narain Singh Kushwaha was an Indian politician and former member of Bihar Legislative Assembly. As a member of Bihar Legislative Assembly, he represented the Kalyanpur, Samastipur Assembly constituency in Bihar Legislative Assembly for two terms, winning the assembly elections in 1967 and 1969.

== Life and political career ==
He was a member of Samyukta Socialist Party and contested his first assembly elections in 1967 on the symbol of SSP. Singh was a member of Koeri community, which is preponderant in Samastipur district and which was involved in tussle with the other preponderant caste Bhumihar in the Kalyanpur constituency for the political power. In 1967 he was voted to power for the first time.

He again contested in 1969 Assembly elections and defeated his nearest political rival to become the legislator for the second time.
