= Suresh Kumar Sharma =

Indian politician

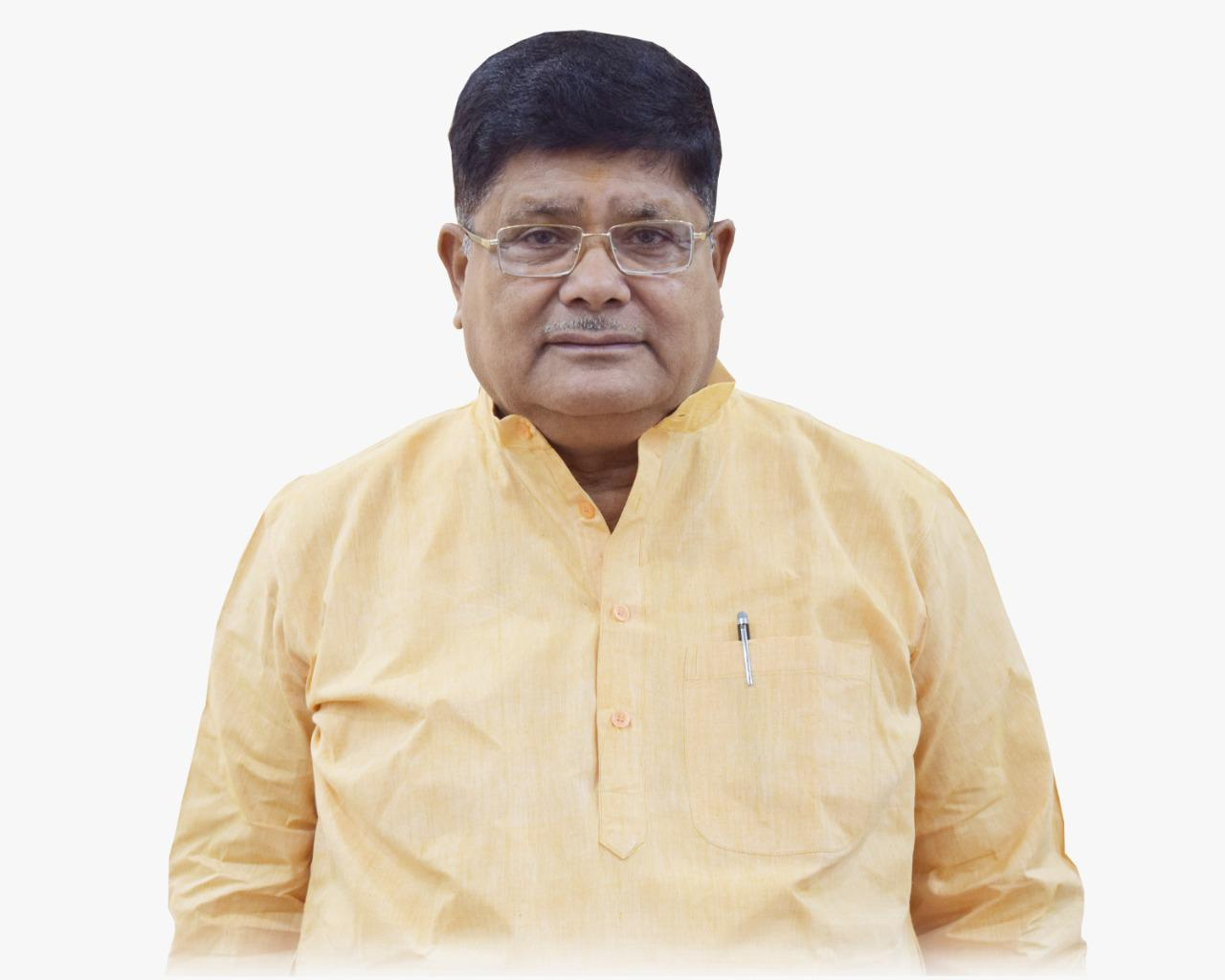
- Suresh Kumar Sharma

Cabinet Minister Government of Bihar
- In office 29 July 2017 – 16 November 2020
- Ministry: Term
- Minister of Urban Development & Housing: 29 July 2017 - 16 November 2020

Member of Bihar Legislative Assembly
- In office 2010–2020
- Preceded by: Bijendra Chaudhary
- Succeeded by: Bijendra Chaudhary
- Constituency: Muzaffarpur

Personal details
- Born: 9 October 1946 (age 79)
- Party: Bharatiya Janata Party
- Spouse: Rajkumari Sinha
- Children: 4

Suresh Kumar Sharma (born 9 October 1946) is an Indian politician associated with Bharatiya Janata Party who served as the Minister of Urban Development & Housing in Sixth Nitish Kumar ministry. He lost 2020 election from Muzaffarpur (Vidhan Sabha constituency) against Bijendra Chaudhary of Indian National Congress.

== Political Background ==
First time He was elected to the Bihar Legislative Assembly from Muzaffarpur (Vidhan Sabha constituency) as a member of the Bharatiya Janata Party in 2010.

Again in the 2015 He had won from the same seat Muzaffarpur (Vidhan Sabha constituency) elected second time for the Bihar Legislative Assembly as a Member of Bharatiya Janata Party.

Suresh Kumar Sharma lost 2020 Bihar Legislative assembly election from Muzaffarpur (Vidhan Sabha constituency).
