= Gami =

Gami may refer to:

- Gami (がみ), the rendaku form of kami (かみ) and origami paper (かみ)
- Gämi, a village and suburb on the southeastern outskirts of Ashgabat, Turkmenistan
- Amarnath Gami (born 1967), Indian politician
- Mahmud Gami (1765–1855), Kashmiri poet
- Gaami, a 2024 Indian film by Vidyadhar Kagita
