= Prince Raj =

Indian politician (born 1989)

Prince Raj Paswan
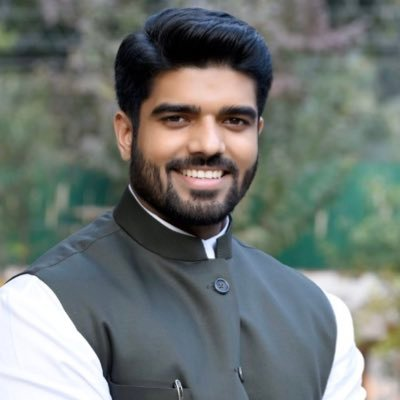
- Prince Raj Paswan

Member of Parliament, Lok Sabha
- In office 24 October 2019 – 4 June 2024
- Preceded by: Ram Chandra Paswan
- Succeeded by: Shambhavi Choudhary
- Constituency: Samastipur, Bihar

President of Lok Janshakti Party, Bihar
- In office 26 October 2019 – 24 February 2021
- Preceded by: Pashupati Kumar Paras
- Succeeded by: Raju Tiwari

Personal details
- Born: 7 July 1989 (age 36) Khagaria, Bihar, India
- Party: Rashtriya Lok Janshakti Party (since 2021)
- Other political affiliations: Lok Janshakti Party (2013–2021)
- Relations: Ram Vilas Paswan (uncle); Pashupati Kumar Paras (uncle); Chirag Paswan (cousin); Arun Bharti (brother-in-law); Yash Raj Paswan (cousin)
- Parents: Ram Chandra Paswan (father); Sunaina Devi (mother)
- Occupation: Indian Politician

Prince Raj Paswan (born 7 July 1989) is an Indian politician. He was elected as Member of Parliament, Lok Sabha from Samastipur in a by-poll on 24 October 2019, after the death of his father and sitting MP Ram Chandra Paswan. Prince Raj was appointed president of Bihar unit of Lok Janshakti Party in October 2019, replacing his uncle Pashupati Kumar Paras.

He became the member of Committee on Welfare of Scheduled Castes and Scheduled Tribes as well as Consultative Committee, Ministry of Youth Affairs and Sports.

Prince Raj holds a Bachelor of Business Administration (BBA) degree from Madurai Kamaraj University and a Master of Science (M.Sc.) in International Business from the University of Hertfordshire, De Havilland Campus, United Kingdom.

He entered politics in 2013 and contested the Bihar Vidhan Sabha elections from the Kalyanpur (SC) constituency in 2015. In 2018, he was appointed as the National President of the Students Wing of the Lok Janshakti Party (LJP).

In 2021, following the split of the Lok Janshakti Party (LJP), the Rashtriya Lok Janshakti Party (RLJP) was formed, with Prince Raj Paswan appointed as the President of its Bihar state unit

Lok Sabha
Preceded by Ram Chandra Paswan	Member of Parliament for Samastipur; 2019–2024	Succeeded by Incumbent
