= Rameshwar Sahu =

Indian politician

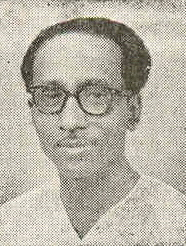

Member of Parliament, Lok Sabha
- In office 1952–1967
- Succeeded by: Kedar Paswan
- Constituency: Rosera, Bihar

Deputy Finance Minister
- In office 1964-1966
- Prime Minister: Lal Bahadur Shastri
- Preceded by: Lalit Narayan Mishra

Personal details
- Born: 1 November 1919 Madhubani, Bihar, British India
- Party: Indian National Congress
- Spouse: Pavitri Devi

Rameshwar Sahu (born 1 November 1919, date of death unknown) was an Indian politician. He was elected to the Lok Sabha, the lower house of the Parliament of India from the Rosera in Bihar as a member of the Indian National Congress. He was Deputy Finance Minister of India from 1964 - 1966. He was Chairman of all India Railway in 1971-1972. He left his politics carrier in 1972.
