= Ram Bhagat Paswan =

Indian politician

Member of Parliament, Lok Sabha
- In office 1971–1977
- Preceded by: Kedar Paswan
- Succeeded by: Ram Sewak Hazary
- In office 1984-1989
- Preceded by: Baleshwar Ram
- Succeeded by: Dasai Chowdhary
- Constituency: Rosera, Bihar

Member of Parliament, Rajya Sabha
- In office 1980-1984
- Constituency: Bihar

Personal details
- Born: 31 December 1933 Madhuban Village, Darbhanga, Bihar, British India
- Died: 12 July 2010 (aged 76) New Delhi, India
- Party: Indian National Congress
- Spouse: Bimla Devi
- Children: 2 Daughters and 3 Sons

Ram Bhagat Paswan also spelt Bagat is an Indian politician. He was elected to the Lok Sabha, the lower house of the Parliament of India from the Rosera in Bihar as a member of the Indian National Congress.
