= Amar Kumar Paswan =

Indian politician

Member of the Bihar Legislative Assembly
- In office 2022–2025
- Preceded by: Musafir Paswan
- Succeeded by: Baby Kumari
- Constituency: Bochahan

Personal details
- Born: 1989 (age 36–37)
- Party: Rashtriya Janata Dal
- Parent: Musafir Paswan (father)
- Education: MBA
- Alma mater: Gandhi Institute of Technology and Management

Amar Kumar Paswan (born 1989) is an Indian politician. He serves as Member of the Bihar Legislative Assembly from the Bochahan Assembly constituency. Paswan was elected to the assembly in April 2022. He is representing the Rashtriya Janata Dal of Lalu Prasad Yadav. His father, Musafir Paswan, was sitting MLA when he died in 2021, representing the Vikassheel Insaan Party.

== Early life ==
Amar Kumar Paswan was born to Musafir Paswan in 1989. His father was the MLA when he died in 2021, representing the Vikassheel Insaan Party.

He earned an MBA degree from Gandhi Institute of Technology and Management from 2013.
