= Rosera Assembly constituency =

Rosera
- Constituency No. 139 for the Bihar Legislative Assembly

Constituency details
- Country: India
- Region: East India
- State: Bihar
- District: Samastipur
- Lok Sabha constituency: Samastipur
- Established: 1951
- Total electors: 331,466

Member of Legislative Assembly
- 18th Bihar Legislative Assembly
- Incumbent Birendra Kumar
- Party: BJP
- Alliance: NDA
- Elected year: 2025

Rosera is an assembly constituency in Samastipur district in the Indian state of Bihar. The seat is reserved for members of the Scheduled Castes.

== Overview ==
As per Delimitation of Parliamentary and Assembly constituencies Order, 2008, No. 139 Rosera Assembly constituency is composed of the following: Rosera community development block; Phulhara, Lilhaul, Singhia-I, Singhia-II, Singhia-III, Mahen, Wari, Nirpur Bhaririya, Bangarahta, Hardiya, Mahra and Keothar of gram panchayats of Singhia CD Block; Shankarpur, Jakhar Dharampur, Ghiwahi, Dasaut, Rahiar North, Rahiar South, Ballipur, Bandhar, Karain, Raniparti and Rajaur Rambhadrapur gram panchayats of Shivaji Nagar CD Block.

Rosera Assembly constituency (रोसड़ा / रोसरा) is part of No. 23 Samastipur (Lok Sabha constituency).

== Members of the Legislative Assembly ==
| Year | Name | Party |
|---|---|---|
| 1952 | Mahabir Raut | Indian National Congress |
| 1957 | Mahabir Raut | Indian National Congress |
| 1962 | Ramakant Jha | Praja Socialist Party |
| 1967 | Ramakant Jha | Samyukta Socialist Party |
| 1969 | Sahdeo Mahato | Indian National Congress |
| 1972 | Ramashrey Rai | Bharatiya Jana Sangh |
| 1977 | Prayag Mandal | Independent politician |
| 1980 | Ramashrey Rai | Indian National Congress |
| 1985 | Bhola Mandar | Lokdal |
| 1986^ | Gajendra Prasad Singh | Lokdal |
| 1990 | Gajendra Prasad Singh | Janata Dal |
| 1995 | Gajendra Prasad Singh | Janata Dal |
| 2000 | Ashok Kumar | Samata Party |
| 2005 | Gajendra Prasad Singh | Rashtriya Janata Dal |
| 2005 | Gajendra Prasad Singh | Rashtriya Janata Dal |
| 2010 | Manju Hazari | Bharatiya Janata Party |
| 2015 | Ashok Kumar | Indian National Congress |
| 2020 | Birendra Kumar | Bharatiya Janata Party |

== Election results ==
=== 2025 ===
2025 Bihar Legislative Assembly election:Rosera
| Party | Candidate | Votes | % | ±% |
|---|---|---|---|---|
| BJP | Birendra Kumar | 122,773 | 55.02 | +7.09 |
| INC | Braj Kishore Ravi | 72,240 | 32.37 | +4.1 |
| JSP | Rohit Kumar | 14,913 | 6.68 | |
| Independent | Rajesh Kumar Paswan | 3,885 | 1.74 | |
| Bhartiya Mahasangh Party | Devendra Kumar Paswan | 3,574 | 1.6 | |
| BSP | Amit Kumar Baitha | 2,748 | 1.23 | +0.31 |
| NOTA | None of the above | 3,016 | 1.35 | −1.56 |
| Majority | | 50,533 | 22.65 | +2.99 |
| Turnout | | 223,149 | 67.32 | +12.24 |
| BJP gain from | | Swing | NDA | |

=== 2020 ===
2020 Bihar Legislative Assembly election: Rosera
| Party | Candidate | Votes | % | ±% |
|---|---|---|---|---|
| BJP | Birendra Kumar | 87,163 | 47.93 | +16.47 |
| INC | Nagendra Kumar Paswan | 51,419 | 28.27 | −24.32 |
| LJP | Krishna Raj | 22,995 | 12.64 | |
| Independent | Shrawan Kumar | 4,191 | 2.3 | |
| Independent | Surendra Das | 3,556 | 1.96 | |
| BSP | Vijay Kumar Ram | 1,665 | 0.92 | −0.07 |
| Independent | Shailendra Chaudhari | 1,649 | 0.91 | |
| NOTA | None of the above | 5,284 | 2.91 | −0.68 |
| Majority | | 35,744 | 19.66 | −1.47 |
| Turnout | | 181,864 | 55.08 | +0.15 |
| BJP gain from INC | | Swing | | |

=== 2015 ===
2015 Bihar Legislative Assembly election: Rosera
| Party | Candidate | Votes | % | ±% |
|---|---|---|---|---|
| INC | Dr. Ashok Kumar | 85,506 | 52.59 | |
| BJP | Manju Hazari | 51,145 | 31.46 | |
| CPI | Indal Paswan | 9,543 | 5.87 | |
| RJP | Surendra Das | 2,355 | 1.45 | |
| Independent | Arun Ram | 2,315 | 1.42 | |
| Independent | Ram Bahadur Azad | 1,783 | 1.1 | |
| BSP | Baleshwar Paswan | 1,610 | 0.99 | |
| NOTA | None of the above | 5,841 | 3.59 | |
| Majority | | 34,361 | 21.13 | |
| Turnout | | 162,578 | 54.93 | |

=== 2010 ===
In the 2016 Election Mahagathbandhan in Bihar seat went to Congress. Dr. Ashok Kumar won the Rosera seat, defeating his rival Manju Hajari.

In the 2010 state assembly elections, Manju Hajari of BJP won the Rosera seat defeating her nearest rival Pitamber Paswan of RJD. Electoral contests in most years featured multiple candidates but only winners and runners up are being mentioned. Gajendra Prasad Singh of RJD defeated Ashok Kumar of JD(U) in October 2005 and February 2005. Ashok Kumar of JD(U) defeated Gajendra Prasad Singh of RJD in 2000. Gajendra Prasad Singh of Janata Dal defeated Ramashray Roy of Congress in 1995 and Rama Kant Jha of Congress in 1990. Bhola Mandar of Lok Dal defeated Satyendra Narain Choudhary of Congress in 1985. Ramashray Rai of Congress (I) defeated Ram Lakhan Singh of Janata Party (SC) in 1980. Prayag Mandal, Independent, defeated Ramashay Rai of Congress in 1977.
