= Bijendra Chaudhary =

Indian politician

Member of the Bihar Legislative Assembly
- In office 2020–2025
- Preceded by: Suresh Kumar Sharma
- Succeeded by: Ranjan Kumar
- Constituency: Muzaffarpur

Personal details
- Party: Indian National Congress

Bijendra Chaudhary is an Indian politician and a member of the Bihar Legislative Assembly, representing the Muzaffarpur Assembly constituency in the Muzaffarpur district. He is a member of the Indian National Congress.
