= Ashok Kumar (Warisnagar politician) =

Indian politician

Ashok Kumar Munna
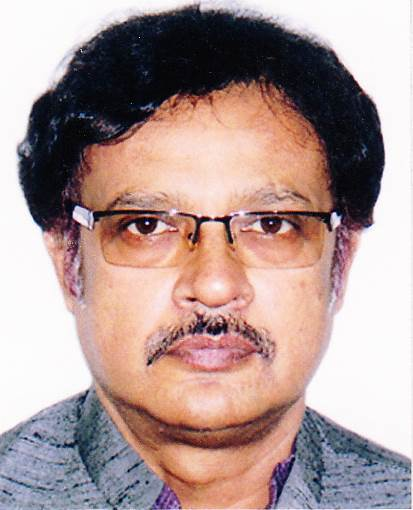

Member of the Bihar Legislative Assembly
- In office 2010–2025
- Preceded by: Vishwanath Paswan
- Succeeded by: Manjarik Mrinal
- Constituency: Warisnagar

Ashok Kumar is an Indian politician from Samastipur ( Bihar) and of the 'वारिसनगर' Bihar Legislative Assembly. He was elected from Warisnagar constituency in the 2015 Bihar Legislative Assembly election as a candidate from Janata Dal (United) of the Mahagathbandhan (Bihar). He is from Katghara village. He is commonly known as Munna Singh by the villagers.

== Life ==
Ashok Kumar Munna is a Kurmi by caste and he has won on the symbol of JD(U) from the Warisnagar Assembly constituency for three terms.
