= Birendra Kumar (Bihar politician) =

Indian politician (born 1976)

Birendra Kumar (born 16 October 1976) is an Indian politician from Bihar. He is an MLA from Rosera Assembly constituency which is reserved for Scheduled Caste community in Samastipur District. He won the 2020 Bihar Legislative Assembly election representing Bharatiya Janata Party.

== Early life and education ==
Kumar is from Warisnagar, Samastipur District, Bihar. He is the son of Rajendra Paswan. He completed his graduation in 1995 at a college affiliated with Lalit Narayan Mithila University, Darbhanga.

== Career ==
Kumar won from Rosera Assembly constituency representing Bharatiya Janata Party in the 2020 Bihar Legislative Assembly election. He polled 87,163 votes and defeated his nearest rival, Nagendra Kumar Vikal of Indian National Congress, by a margin of 35,744 votes.
