= Samastipur Lok Sabha constituency =

Lok Sabha Constituency in Bihar, India

Coordinates: 25.9°N 85.8°E

Samastipur
- Lok Sabha constituency

Constituency details
- Country: India
- Region: East India
- State: Bihar
- Assembly constituencies: Kusheshwar Asthan; Hayaghat; Kalyanpur; Warisnagar; Samastipur; Rosera
- Established: 1952
- Reservation: SC

Member of Parliament
- 18th Lok Sabha
- Incumbent Shambhavi Choudhary; D/O: Ashok Choudhary; Minister of Building Construction, Govt. of Bihar
- Party: LJP(RV)
- Alliance: NDA
- Elected year: 2024
- Preceded by: Prince Raj

Samastipur is one of the 40 Lok Sabha (parliamentary) constituencies in Bihar state in eastern India. It is reserved for Scheduled Castes. In the Legislative Assembly segment of this Lok Sabha constituency, Kushwaha, and Yadav caste are dominant, however, due to preponderance of other caste groups, Extremely Backward Castes and Schedule Castes also determine the election results.

== Vidhan Sabha segments ==
Samastipur Lok Sabha constituency comprises the following six Vidhan Sabha (legislative assembly) segments:

#	Name	District	Member	Party	2024 lead
78	Kusheshwar Asthan (SC)	Darbhanga	Atirek Kumar	JD(U)	LJP(RV)
84	Hayaghat	Darbhanga	Ram Chandra Prasad	BJP	LJP(RV)
131	Kalyanpur (SC)	Samastipur	Maheshwar Hazari	JD(U)	LJP(RV)
132	Warisnagar	Samastipur	Manjarik Mrinal	JD(U)	LJP(RV)
133	Samastipur	Samastipur	Ashwamedh Devi	JD(U)	LJP(RV)
139	Rosera (SC)	Samastipur	Birendra Kumar	BJP	LJP(RV)

== Members of Parliament ==
Year	Name	Party
1952	Satya Narayan Sinha	Indian National Congress
1957	Satya Narayan Sinha	Indian National Congress
1962	Satya Narayan Sinha	Indian National Congress
1967	Yamuna Prasad Mandal	Indian National Congress
1971	Yamuna Prasad Mandal	Indian National Congress
1977	Karpoori Thakur	Janata Party
1978^	Ajit Kumar Mehta	Janata Party
1980	Ajit Kumar Mehta	Janata Party (Secular)
1984	Ramdeo Rai	Indian National Congress
1989	Manjay Lal	Janata Dal
1991	Manjay Lal	Janata Dal
1996	Ajit Kumar Mehta	Janata Dal
1998	Ajit Kumar Mehta	Rashtriya Janata Dal
1999	Manjay Lal	Janata Dal (United)
2004	Alok Kumar Mehta	Rashtriya Janata Dal
2009	Maheshwar Hazari	Janata Dal (United)
2014	Ram Chandra Paswan	Lok Janshakti Party
2019	Ram Chandra Paswan	Lok Janshakti Party
2019^	Prince Raj	Lok Janshakti Party
2024	Shambhavi Choudhary	Lok Janshakti Party (Ram Vilas)

^ by-poll

== Result ==
=== 2024 ===
2024 Indian general election: Samastipur
Party	Candidate	Votes	%	±%
LJP(RV)	Shambhavi Choudhary	579,786	52.97	
INC	Sunny Hazari	3,92,535	35.86	
NOTA	None of the Above	32,668	2.98	
BSP	Ram Lakhan Mahto	12,732	1.16	
Majority		1,87,251	17.11	
Turnout		10,95,866	60.21	
LJP(RV) gain from LJP		Swing		

=== 2019 By-election ===
Bye-elections, 2019: Samastipur
Party	Candidate	Votes	%	±%
LJP	Prince Raj	390,276	49.48	▼5.71
INC	Ashok Kumar	2,88,186	36.54	▲6.04
IND	Suraj Kumar Das	36,152	4.58	▲4.58
NOTA	None of the Above	25,694	3.26	
Majority		1,02,090	12.94	
Turnout		7,88,718	46.93	−13.86
LJP hold		Swing		

=== 2019 ===
2019 Indian general election: Samastipur
Party	Candidate	Votes	%	±%
LJP	Ram Chandra Paswan	562,443	55.19	
INC	Ashok Kumar	3,10,800	30.50	−0.03
NOTA	None of the Above	35,417	3.48	
WAP	Vidya Nand Ram	29,392	2.88	
IND.	Suraj Kumar Das	22,187	2.18	
Majority		2,51,643	24.69	
Turnout		10,19,771	60.74	
LJP hold		Swing		

=== General election 2014 ===
2014 Indian general election: Samastipur
Party	Candidate	Votes	%	±%
LJP	Ram Chandra Paswan	2,73,654	31.33	
INC	Ashok Kumar	2,63,529	30.53	
JD(U)	Maheshwar Hazari	2,00,124	23.18	
NOTA	None of the Above	29,211	3.38	
JDR	Baleshwar Paswan	15,837	1.83	
Majority		10,128	0.80	
Turnout		8,63,211	57.38	
LJP gain from JD(U)		Swing		

=== 1991 ===
1991 Indian general election: Samastipur
Party	Candidate	Votes	%	±%
JD	Manjay Lal	430,450	60.99	▼3.97
INC	Baliram Bhagat	191,418	27.12	▼3.64
BJP	Chandra Kant Choudhary	60,344	8.55	New entry
Independent	Anil Kumar Gupta	8,315	1.18	Steady
JP	Ajit Kumar Mehta	6,988	0.99	New entry
Independent	Brahadeo Singh	2,580	0.37	Steady
SOP(L)	Upendra Poddar	1,949	0.28	New entry
Independent	Suresh Choudhary	583	0.08	Steady
Independent	Tirthanand Choudhary	502	0.07	Steady
LKD	Turantlal Sahni	281	0.04	New entry
Independent	Rajendra Prasad Singh	267	0.04	Steady
Doordarshi Party	Ganpat Mahto	257	0.04	▼0.18
Independent	Vanarsi Thakur	256	0.04	Steady
BKUS	Dilip Kumar Sahni	241	0.03	New entry
Independent	Awadh Sahni	187	0.03	Steady
Independent	Kalpu Paswan	175	0.02	Steady
Independent	Yogendra Prasad Singh	156	0.02	Steady
Independent	Anandlal Singh	143	0.02	Steady
Independent	Vidyasagar Gupta	136	0.02	Steady
Independent	Raj Narayan Mishra	125	0.02	Steady
Independent	Dharmakant Thakur	97	0.01	Steady
Independent	Ramnarayan Singh	88	0.01	Steady
Independent	Ramvilash Mahto	86	0.01	Steady
Independent	Parmanand Mishra	80	0.01	Steady
Independent	Ramakant Pathak	57	0.01	Steady
Majority		239,032	33.87	▼0.33
Turnout		713,698	65.91	▲0.41
JD hold		Swing		

=== 1989 ===
1989 Indian general election: Samastipur
Party	Candidate	Votes	%	±%
JD	Manjai Lal	451,477	64.96	New entry
INC	Ramdeo Rai	213,796	30.76	▼27.00
LKD(B)	Shiva Shankar Sahni	8,894	1.28	New entry
Independent	Suresh Choudhary	5,425	0.78	Steady
Independent	Jia Ram Singh	2,424	0.35	Steady
DDP	Jogi Rai	1,516	0.22	New entry
Independent	Bhagwat Rai	1,186	0.17	Steady
Independent	Saroj Thakur	1,085	0.16	Steady
Independent	Mahesh Jha	1,018	0.15	Steady
Independent	Sivaram Mahto	1,009	0.15	Steady
Independent	Anil Kumar Sharma	978	0.14	Steady
Independent	Surendra Prassad	928	0.13	Steady
Independent	Shyam Sunder Bhagat	594	0.09	Steady
Independent	Ramparwasji Rai	587	0.08	Steady
Independent	Yogendra Prassad Singh	569	0.08	Steady
Independent	Nagendra Rai Yadav	563	0.08	Steady
Independent	Amir Hassan	549	0.08	Steady
Independent	Tapesvar Rai	538	0.08	Steady
Independent	Shanbhu Singh	422	0.06	Steady
Independent	Shilendar Sah	419	0.06	Steady
Independent	Mahesh Singh	407	0.06	Steady
Independent	Dilip Kumar Sahni	402	0.06	Steady
Independent	Harilal Rai	177	0.03	Steady
Majority		237,681	34.20	▲15.09
Turnout		704,303	65.50	▲1.82
JD gain from INC		Swing		

=== 1984 ===
1984 Indian general election: Samastipur
Party	Candidate	Votes	%	±%
INC	Ramdeo Rai	327,585	57.76	New entry
LKD	Karpoori Thakur	219,224	38.65	New entry
Independent	Yogendra Prasad Narain Singh	4,846	0.85	Steady
Independent	Baidyanath Mehta	2,923	0.52	Steady
Independent	Rama Shankar Bajpayee	2,228	0.39	Steady
Independent	Srimant Kr. Choudhary	2,139	0.38	Steady
Independent	Ram Bhajan Sharma	1,946	0.34	Steady
Independent	Harihar Prasad Sharma	1,871	0.33	Steady
Independent	Rajeshwar Prasad Mandal	1,735	0.31	Steady
Independent	Nand Lal Sah	1,642	0.29	Steady
Independent	Sahdeo Sahni	1,006	0.18	Steady
Majority		108,361	19.11	▲0.71
Turnout		579,340	63.68	▲7.78
INC gain from JP(S)		Swing		

=== 1980 ===
1980 Indian general election: Samastipur
Party	Candidate	Votes	%	±%
JP(S)	Ajit Kumar Mehta	236,436	50.28	New entry
INC(I)	K. K. Mandal	149,912	31.88	▼11.55
JP	Kailashpati Singh	55,245	11.75	▼37.08
Independent	Umadhar Singh	13,151	2.80	Steady
Independent	Kameshwar Prasad Thakur	3,110	0.66	Steady
Independent	Bhikhar Mahto	2,552	0.54	Steady
Independent	Badri Narain Poddar	2,287	0.49	Steady
Independent	Maheshwar Das	1,831	0.39	Steady
Independent	Jagannath Poddar	1,742	0.37	Steady
Independent	Nazir Mian	1,111	0.24	Steady
Independent	Kira Moch	1,012	0.22	Steady
Independent	Mahabir Choubey	698	0.15	Steady
Independent	Bhai Gopal	662	0.14	Steady
Independent	Jagdish Prasad Rai	473	0.10	Steady
Majority		86,524	18.40	▲13.01
Turnout		475,011	55.90	▼14.79
JP(S) gain from JP		Swing		

=== 1978 by-election ===
1978 Samastipur by-election
Party	Candidate	Votes	%	±%
JP	Ajit Kumar Mehta	243,554	48.83	▼29.39
INC(I)	T. Sinha	216,690	43.43	New entry
Independent	U. Singh	18,686	3.75	Steady
INC	C. P. Verma	5,394	1.08	▼13.42
Independent	R. J. Rai	4,236	0.85	Steady
Independent	K. K. Sharma	3,050	0.61	Steady
Independent	M. Singh	2,831	0.57	Steady
Independent	J. C. Purbey	2,301	0.46	Steady
Independent	N. Mian	1,553	0.31	Steady
Independent	R. N. Singh	981	0.20	Steady
Independent	D. Pandey	974	0.20	Steady
Majority		26,864	5.39	▼58.33
Turnout				
JP hold		Swing		

=== 1977 ===
1977 Indian general election: Samastipur
Party	Candidate	Votes	%	±%
JP	Karpoori Thakur	401,935	78.22	New entry
INC	Yamuna Prasad Mandal	74,501	14.50	▼34.64
CPI	Parma Nand Singh 'Madan'	29,028	5.65	New entry
Independent	Sureshwar Prasad Singh	8,414	1.64	Steady
Majority		327,434	63.72	▲41.42
Turnout		520,131	70.69	▲15.45
JP gain from INC		Swing		

=== 1971 ===
1971 Indian general election: Samastipur
Party	Candidate	Votes	%	±%
INC	Yamuna Prasad Mandal	166,827	49.14	▲7.97
ABJS	Valmiki Prasad Singh	91,111	26.84	▲17.20
SSP	Munshilal Roy	73,359	21.61	▼9.38
PBI	Lalit Kumar Singh	2,842	0.84	New entry
Independent	Yadunandan Thakur	2,118	0.62	Steady
Independent	Jwala Prasad Choudhary	1,422	0.42	Steady
Independent	Bhola Nath Choudhary	943	0.28	Steady
Independent	Rampur Prasad Roy	842	0.25	Steady
Majority		75,716	22.30	▲12.12
Turnout		342,224	55.24	▼5.60
INC hold		Swing		

=== 1967 ===
1967 Indian general election: Samastipur
Party	Candidate	Votes	%	±%
INC	Y. P. Mandal	128,148	41.17	▼0.32
SSP	C. L. Rai	96,476	30.99	New entry
PSP	B. N. Singh	56,653	18.20	▼12.46
ABJS	B. P. Singh	29,999	9.64	New entry
Majority		31,672	10.18	▼0.65
Turnout		324,023	60.84	▲6.53
INC hold		Swing		

=== 1962 ===
1962 Indian general election: Samastipur
Party	Candidate	Votes	%	±%
INC	Satya Narayan Sinha	82,522	41.49	▼12.02
PSP	Rajendra Mahto	60,972	30.66	▲2.80
SWA	Ramasray Prasad Choudhary	45,411	22.83	New entry
Socialist	Banarsi Prasad Sha	9,991	5.02	New entry
Majority		21,550	10.83	▼14.82
Turnout		208,396	54.31	▲6.13
INC hold		Swing		

=== 1957 ===
1957 Indian general election: Samastipur
Party	Candidate	Votes	%	±%
INC	Satya Narayan Sinha	89,266	53.51	▲2.25
PSP	Rajendra Narain Sharma	46,474	27.86	New entry
Independent	Badri Narayan Sinha	23,122	13.86	Steady
Independent	Lakshman Pd. Bhagat	7,953	4.77	Steady
Majority		42,792	25.65	▲5.94
Turnout		166,815	48.18	▲11.99
INC hold		Swing		

=== 1952 ===
1952 Indian general election: Samastipur East
Party	Candidate	Votes	%	±%
INC	Satya Narain Sinha	63,019	51.26	New entry
Socialist	Badri Narain Sinha	38,790	31.55	New entry
Independent	Ram Prakash Sharma	14,477	11.78	Steady
Independent	Phuleshwar Mukhya	6,660	5.42	Steady
Majority		24,229	19.71	New entry
Turnout		122,946	36.19	New entry
INC win (new seat)				

== See also ==
- List of constituencies of the Lok Sabha
- Samastipur district
