= Ram Chandra Paswan =

Indian politician (1962–2019)

Member of Parliament, Lok Sabha
- In office 16 May 2014 – 21 July 2019
- Preceded by: Maheshwar Hazari
- Succeeded by: Prince Raj
- Constituency: Samastipur, Bihar

Personal details
- Born: 1 January 1962 Khagaria, Bihar, India
- Died: 21 July 2019 (aged 57) New Delhi, Delhi, India
- Party: Lok Janshakti Party
- Spouse: Sunaina Kumari (m. 1984)
- Relations: Ram Vilas Paswan (brother); Pashupati Kumar Paras (brother); Chirag Paswan (nephew); Arun Bharti (son-in-law); Yash Raj Paswan (nephew)
- Children: 3 (including Prince Raj)
- As of 26 May, 2014

Ram Chandra Paswan (1 January 1962 – 21 July 2019) was an Indian politician who was elected four times to the Lok Sabha in 1999 and 2004 from Rosera (Lok Sabha constituency), and in 2014 and 2019 from Samastipur constituency of Bihar. At the time of his death, he was a member of the Lok Janshakti Party political party. His son Prince Raj won the by-election triggered by his death. He was the younger brother of Ram Vilas Paswan.

He died after suffering cardiac arrest at Ram Manohar Lohia Hospital Delhi on 21 July 2019.

Lok Sabha
| Preceded by Pitambar Paswan | Member of Parliament for Rosera; 1999– 2009 | Succeeded by Constituency ceased to exist |
| Preceded by Maheshwar Hazari | Member of Parliament for Samastipur; 2014 – 2019 | Succeeded by Prince Raj |
