= Maheshwar Hazari =

Indian politician

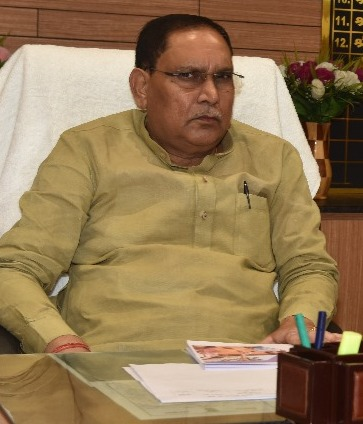

Information and Relation Affairs minister
- In office 15 March 2024 – 20 November 2025
- Succeeded by: Vijay Kumar Chaudhary

Minister of Industry Department and Planning and Development Department
- In office 2015–2020

Personal details
- Born: 9 October 1962 (age 63)
- Party: Janata Dal (United)
- Spouse: Sandhya Hazari
- Children: 3 Sons and 1 daughter

Maheshwar Hazari (born 9 October 1962) is an Indian politician and he served as the Deputy Speaker of Bihar Legislative Assembly. He has previously served as the Minister of Industry Department, Planning and Development Department in the state of Bihar. Prior to this he had charge of the Urban Development and Housing Department, in which he had done many works like Patna Metro and New Patna Map Plan. Later on, he got the charge of PWD (Building Construction Department).

He won Kalyanpur (Samastipur) constituency by one of the highest margins of 52,000 votes, over a nephew of Ram Vilas Paswan. He is a former member of the Indian Parliament, and represented Samastipur (Lok Sabha constituency). He has fought 15th and 16th Loksabha. He was a five-time MLA in the Bihar Legislative Assembly. Hazari is a cousin of Ram Vilas Paswan. He defeated Ram Vilas's brother Ram Chandra Paswan. His father, Ramsewak Hazari, was socialist politician and was an eight-time MLA in the Bihar Assembly, and he was elected to sixth general election as an MP in Loksabha.
