= Manjay Lal =

Indian politician

Manjay Lal (2 January 1925, Rampur Bakhari, Muzaffarpur, Bihar - 29 April 2007 Patna, Bihar, India) was an Indian politician from Janata Dal (United). He has served as member of the Lok Sabha (House Of The People) representing Samastipur (Lok Sabha constituency). He was elected to 9th, 10th and 13th Lok Sabha. Lal was also the Member of the Legislative Assembly in Muzaffarpur from 1977 to 1980.

== Positions held ==
- 1970-1976 - Member, Bihar Legislative Council
- 1977-1979 - Member, Bihar Legislative Assembly, Minister of State for Personnel and Transport, Bihar; Secretary, Socialist Party, Secretary, Praja Socialist Party, Bihar Vice-President, Lok Dal, Bihar Executive Member, Praja Socialist Party, Bihar Member, Public Accounts Committee, Bihar Legislative Assembly
- 1984-1989 - Member, Bihar Legislative Council
- 1989 - Elected to 9th Lok Sabha
- 1990 - Member, Public Accounts Committee; Member, Consultative Committee, Ministry of Agriculture
- 1991 - Re-elected to 10th Lok Sabha (2nd term)
- 1994-1999 - All India General Secretary, Samata Party (Uday Mandal is current President) Member, Central Parliamentary Board, Janata Dal Member, National Executive, Janata Dal
- 1999 - Re-elected to 13th Lok Sabha (3rd term)
- 1999-2000 - Member, Committee on Industry Member, Committee on Estimates
- 2000-2004 - Member, Consultative Committee, Ministry of Steel
