= Baby Kumari =

Indian politician

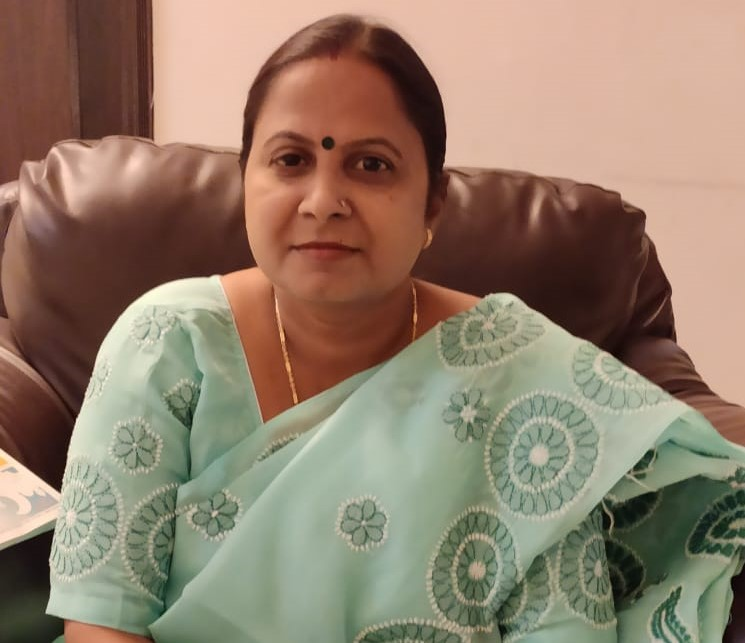

Member of Legislative Assembly, Bihar
- In office 2025 - in office
- In office 2015–2020
- Preceded by: Ramai Ram
- Succeeded by: Musafir Paswan
- Constituency: Bochahan (Vidhan Sabha constituency)

Personal details
- Born: 1 March 1977 (age 49) Muzaffarpur
- Party: Lok Janshakti Party (Ram Vilas)
- Other political affiliations: Bhartiya Janta Party Indian National Congress Independent politician
- Profession: Politician

Baby Kumari (born 1 March 1977) is an Indian politician. She’s currently MLA from Bochahan Constituency secured win Bihar Legislative Assembly Election 2025 on Lok Janshakti Party (Ramvilas) symbol. She was earlier General Secretary of Bihar BJP and was the former State Vice President of Bharatiya Janata Party Bihar unit. She was also the member of 16th Bihar Legislative Assembly. She represented the Bochahan (Vidhan Sabha constituency) of Bihar. In the year 2015, she successfully contested the Bihar Assembly Election as an independent candidate and defeated the then senior Minister of Bihar – Ramai Ram, nine times MLA from Bochahan constituency, with a huge margin of 24,130 votes.

== Posts held ==
#	From	To	Position
01	2015	2020	Member, 16th Legislative Assembly
02	2020	2021	State Vice President of Bihar BJP
03	2021		General Secretary of Bihar BJP
04	2025	In office	MLA of Bochahan
