= Amarnath Gami =

Indian politician

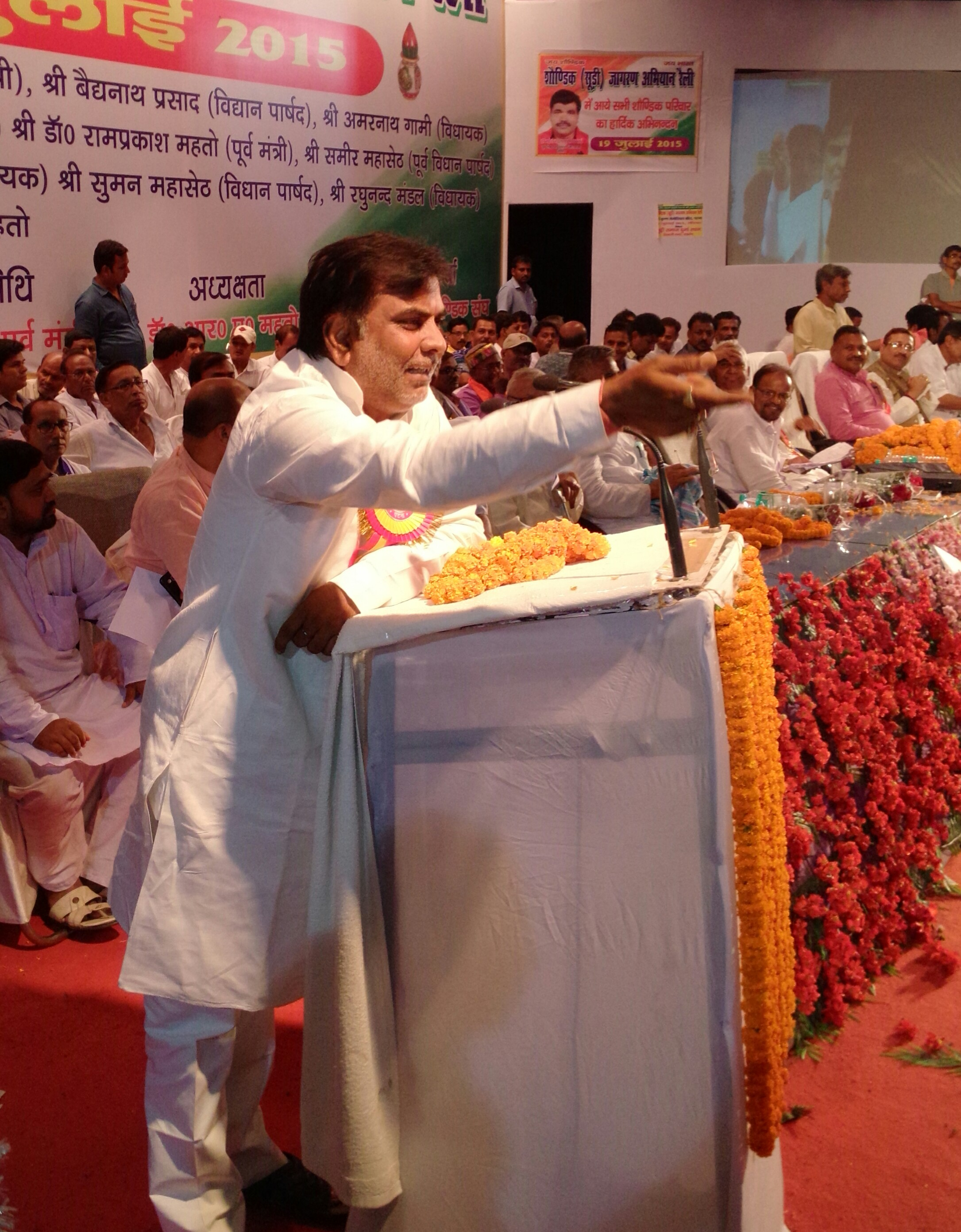
- Amarnath Gami addressing a Public Meeting in Patna

Member of the Bihar Legislative Assembly
- In office 2015–2020
- Succeeded by: Ramchandra Prasad
- Constituency: Hayaghat
- In office 2010–2015
- Constituency: Hayaghat

Personal details
- Born: 1967 (age 58–59)
- Party: Bharatiya Janata Party
- Other political affiliations: Janata Dal (United); Rashtriya Janata Party

Amarnath Gami is an Indian politician who holds the position of the chairman of the Question and Calling Attention Committee of Bihar Legislative Assembly and second time Member of Legislative Assembly representing the Hayaghat constituency of Darbhanga district, Bihar. He was RJD candidate from Darbhanga Town seat in the 2020 Assembly Elections.

He is a member of Bharatiya Janata Party (BJP).
