= Kedar Paswan =

Indian politician

Member of Parliament, Lok Sabha
- In office 1967–1971
- Preceded by: Rameshwar Sahu
- Succeeded by: Ram Bhagat Paswan
- Constituency: Rosera, Bihar

Personal details
- Born: 1920 Harpatti, Darbhanga, Bihar, British India
- Died: 2016 (aged 95–96)
- Party: Samyukta Socialist Party
- Spouse: Dukhhni Paswan

Kedar Paswan (1920-2016) was an Indian politician. He was elected to the Lok Sabha, the lower house of the Parliament of India from the Rosera in Bihar as a member of the Samyukta Socialist Party.
