= Musafir Paswan =

Indian politician (died 2021)

Bihar Legislative Assembly
- Preceded by: Baby Kumari
- Succeeded by: Amar Kumar Paswan
- Constituency: Bochahan Assembly constituency

Personal details
- Born: 1954 or 1955
- Died: 24 November 2021 (aged 66) Ganga Ram Hospital, New Delhi, India
- Party: Vikassheel Insaan Party
- Other political affiliations: Rashtriya Janata Dal; Janata Dal (United); Samajwadi Party; Samata Party
- Children: Amar Kumar Paswan
- Parent: Mahendra Paswan (father)
- Occupation: Politics
- Profession: Agriculture and Business

Musafir Paswan (1954/1955 – 24 November 2021) was an Indian politician from Bihar and a member of the Bihar Legislative Assembly. Paswan won the Bochahan Assembly constituency on the Vikassheel Insaan Party ticket in the 2020 Bihar Legislative Assembly election. He previously contested the 1995 Bihar Legislative Assembly election on a Samata Party ticket, 2000 Bihar Legislative Assembly election on a Janata Dal (United) ticket, 2010 Bihar Legislative Assembly election on a Rashtriya Janata Dal ticket, and the 2015 Bihar Legislative Assembly election on a Samajwadi Party ticket from the Bochahan (Vidhan Sabha constituency).

Musafir Paswan died on 24 November 2021 at the age of 66 in Delhi's Sir Ganga Ram Hospital.
