= Ashok Kumar (Rosera politician) =

Indian politician

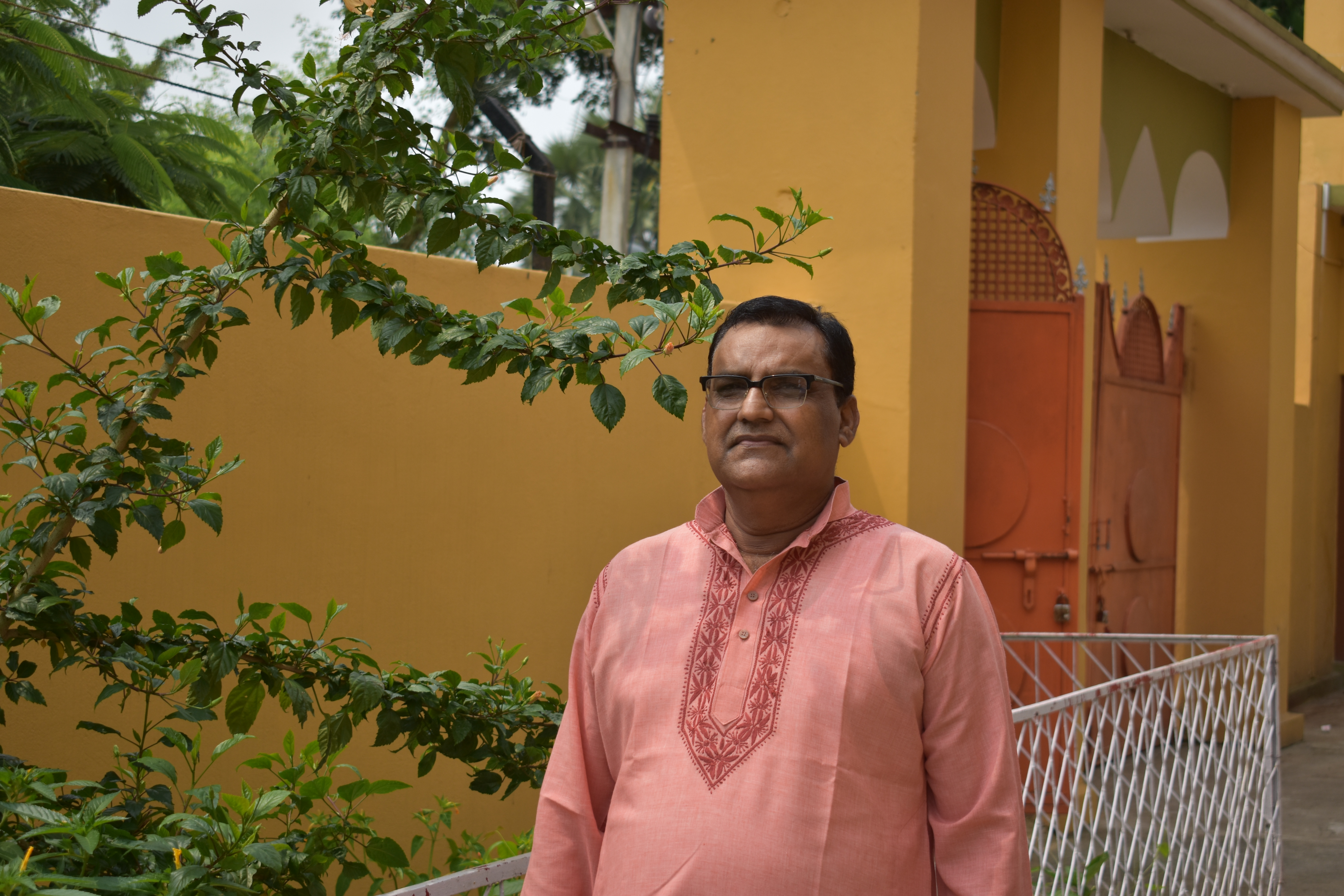
- Ashok Kumar

Member of the Bihar Legislative Assembly
- In office 2015–2020
- Preceded by: Manju Hajari
- Succeeded by: Birendra Kumar
- Constituency: Rosera

Personal details
- Born: 27 October 1954 (age 71) Patna, Bihar, India
- Party: Indian National Congress
- Education: Patna Medical College and Hospital
- As of 4 March, 2018

Ashok Kumar (Hindi: अशोक कुमार, born 27 October 1954) is an Indian politician and a member of the Indian National Congress. He is the current Working President of the Bihar Pradesh Congress Committee. He is a Member of Legislative Assembly where he represents Rosera (Vidhan Sabha constituency), he has represented the constituency for six terms. Dr. Kumar has an MBBS from Patna Medical College and Hospital.

== Political career ==
Kumar entered politics in 1985, when he contested and won from Singhia constituency as an Indian National Congress candidate. In the year 1989, he was appointed Minister of Coal in the Jagannath Mishra led Bihar cabinet, since then he has held several key portfolios including Minister of Institutional Finance, Programme Implementation and Housing. He has also held the post of Congress party whip in the Bihar Legislative Assembly. He was the Leader of the Congress Legislative Party in the Bihar Assembly. He was a member of the Central Election Committee of the All India Congress Committee and a special invitee to the Congress Working Committee.

== See also ==
- List of politicians from Bihar
