= Ram Vilas Paswan =

Indian politician (1946–2020)

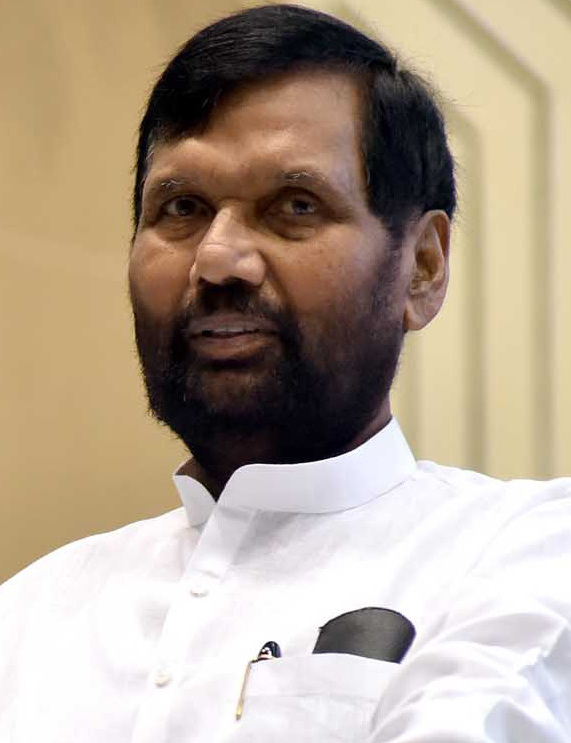
- Paswan in 2017

Union Minister of Consumer Affairs, Food and Public Distribution
- In office 26 May 2014 – 8 October 2020
- Prime Minister: Narendra Modi
- Preceded by: Sharad Pawar
- Succeeded by: Piyush Goyal

Member of Parliament, Rajya Sabha
- In office 28 June 2019 – 8 October 2020
- Preceded by: Ravi Shankar Prasad
- Succeeded by: Sushil Kumar Modi
- Constituency: Bihar
- In office 8 July 2010 – 16 May 2014
- Constituency: Bihar

Union Minister of Chemicals and Fertilizers
- In office 23 May 2004 – 22 May 2009
- Prime Minister: Manmohan Singh
- Preceded by: Sunder Lal Patwa
- Succeeded by: M. K. Alagiri

Union Minister of Steel
- In office 23 May 2004 – 22 May 2009
- Prime Minister: Manmohan Singh
- Preceded by: Braja Kishore Tripathy
- Succeeded by: Virbhadra Singh

Union Minister of Mines
- In office 1 September 2001 – 29 April 2002
- Prime Minister: Atal Bihari Vajpayee
- Preceded by: Sunder Lal Patwa
- Succeeded by: Uma Bharti

Union Minister of Communications and Information Technology
- In office 13 October 1999 – 1 September 2001
- Prime Minister: Atal Bihari Vajpayee
- Preceded by: Atal Bihari Vajpayee
- Succeeded by: Pramod Mahajan

Leader of the House in Lok Sabha
- In office 4 June 1996 – 4 December 1997
- Prime Minister: H. D. Deve Gowda; Inder Kumar Gujral
- Preceded by: Atal Bihari Vajpayee
- Succeeded by: Atal Bihari Vajpayee

Union Minister of Railways
- In office 1 June 1996 – 19 March 1998
- Prime Minister: H. D. Deve Gowda; Inder Kumar Gujral
- Preceded by: C. K. Jaffer Sheriff
- Succeeded by: Nitish Kumar

Union Minister of Labour
- In office 5 December 1989 – 10 November 1990
- Prime Minister: Vishwanath Pratap Singh
- Preceded by: Bindeshwari Dubey
- Succeeded by: Chandra Shekhar

Member of Parliament, Lok Sabha
- In office 16 May 2014 – 23 May 2019
- Preceded by: Ram Sundar Das
- Succeeded by: Pashupati Kumar Paras
- Constituency: Hajipur, Bihar
- In office 10 May 1996 – 16 May 2009
- Preceded by: Ram Sundar Das
- Succeeded by: Ram Sundar Das
- Constituency: Hajipur, Bihar
- In office 22 June 1991 – 12 May 1996
- Preceded by: Dasai Chowdhary
- Succeeded by: Pitambar Paswan
- Constituency: Rosera, Bihar
- In office 28 November 1989 – 21 June 1991
- Preceded by: Ram Ratan Ram
- Succeeded by: Ram Sundar Das
- Constituency: Hajipur, Bihar
- In office 22 March 1977 – 28 December 1984
- Preceded by: Ramshekhar Prasad Singh
- Succeeded by: Ram Ratan Ram
- Constituency: Hajipur, Bihar

Member of Bihar Legislative Assembly
- In office 1969 – 1972
- Preceded by: Mishri Sada
- Succeeded by: Mishri Sada
- Constituency: Alauli

Personal details
- Born: 5 July 1946 Khagaria, Bihar, British India
- Died: 8 October 2020 (aged 74) New Delhi, Delhi, India
- Party: Lok Janshakti Party
- Other political affiliations: Janata Dal; Janata Party
- Spouse: Rajkumari Devi (m. 1969; div. 1981) Reena Sharma (m. 1983–2020)
- Children: 4 (including Chirag Paswan)
- Education: Patna University (M.A, LL.B)
- Awards: Padma Bhushan (2021; posthumously)
- As of 30 May, 2019

Ram Vilas Paswan (5 July 1946 – 8 October 2020) was an Indian politician from Bihar and the Cabinet Minister of Consumer Affairs, Food and Public Distribution in the first and second Modi ministries. Paswan was also the president of the Lok Janshakti Party, nine-times Lok Sabha member and two-time Rajya Sabha MP. He started his political career as a member of Samyukta Socialist Party and was elected to the Bihar Legislative Assembly in 1969. Paswan joined Lok Dal upon its formation in 1974, and became its general secretary. He opposed the emergency, and was arrested during this period. He was first elected to the Lok Sabha in 1977, as a Janata Party member from Hajipur constituency, and was elected again in the 1980, 1989, 1991 (from Rosera), 1996, 1998, 1999, 2004 and 2014 elections.

In 2000, Paswan formed the Lok Janshakti Party (LJP) as its president. Subsequently, in 2004, he joined the ruling United Progressive Alliance government and remained a Union Minister in Ministry of Chemicals and Fertilizers and Ministry of Steel. He was posthumously awarded India's third highest civilian award the Padma Bhushan in 2021.

Known for holding cabinet positions under 7 governments, Paswan was known as the weatherman of Indian politics. As of 2024, he is the longest-serving Union minister who was not a member of the Indian National Congress.

== Early life and education ==
Paswan was born in a Dusadh family on 5 July 1946 in Shaharbanni, Khagaria district of Bihar to Jamun Paswan and Siya Devi. Paswan held Bachelor of Laws and Master of Arts degrees from Kosi College, Khagaria and Patna University. He had been selected as a DSP in Bihar Police in 1969.

== Political career ==
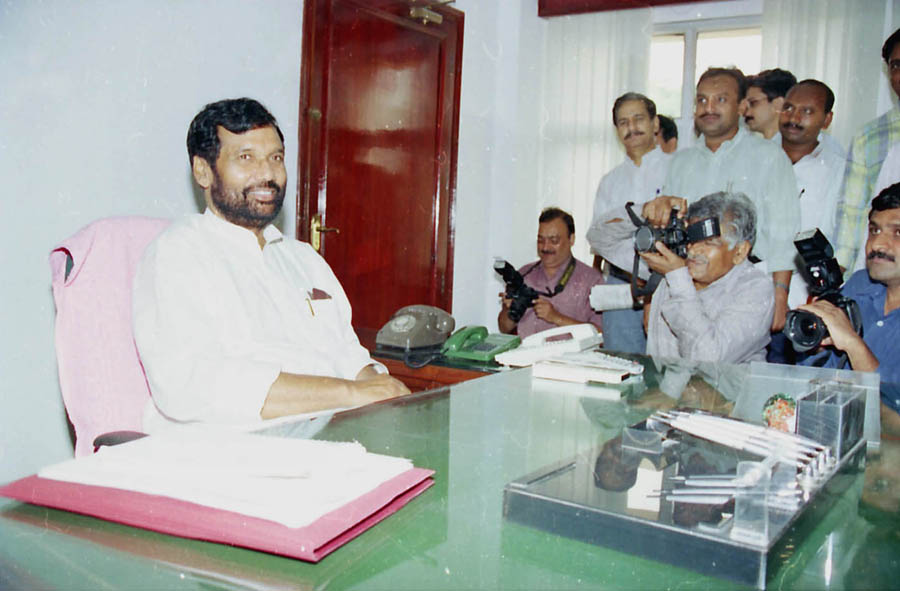
Ram Vilas Paswan in his office after taking charge as the Union Minister of Chemicals & Fertilizers in New Delhi on 24 May 2004

Paswan was elected to the Bihar state legislative assembly in 1969 as a member of the Samyukta Socialist Party ("United Socialist Party") from Alauli, a reserved constituency. He lost 1972 Vidhan Sabha election from Alauli to Shri Mishri Sada of Congress. In 1974, as an ardent follower of Raj Narain and Jayaprakash Narayan Paswan became the general secretary of the Lok Dal. He was personally close to the prominent leaders of anti-emergency like Raj Narain, Karpoori Thakur and Satyendra Narayan Sinha.

In 1975, when emergency was proclaimed in India, Paswan was arrested and spent the entire period in jail. On being released in 1977, he became a member of the Janata Party and won election to Parliament for the first time on its ticket from Hajipur with a record margin (later broken) of 424,000 and 89.3% votes which is perhaps an all-time record for general election in India. Former PM Narasimha Rao got a higher percentage of vote in a 1991 bye-poll. When Janata Party split in 1979, he joined Charan Singh's faction. Paswan was re-elected to the 7th Lok Sabha in 1980 from Hajipur constituency as Janata Party (Socialist) candidate. In 1983, he established the Dalit Sena, an organisation for Dalit emancipation and welfare. The Dalit Sena was later headed by his brother Ram Chandra Paswan. Later it was renamed as Scheduled Caste sena in a vein similar to the Scheduled Caste federation established by Bhim Rao Ambedkar. Paswan lost 1984 Lok Sabha election from Hajipur.

Paswan was elected to the 9th Lok Sabha in 1989 and was appointed Union Minister of Labour and Welfare in the Vishwanath Pratap Singh government. He was elected to Lok Sabha from Rosera (Lok Sabha constituency) in 1991, the only time between 1977 and 2014 when he did not contest from Hajipur. In 1996, he won again from Hajipur, and he even led the ruling alliance or proposition in the Lok Sabha as the prime minister was a member of the Rajya Sabha. This was also the year when Paswan first became the Union Railway Minister. He continued to hold that post till 1998. Thereafter, Paswan was the Union Communications Minister from October 1999 to September 2001 when he was shifted to the Coal Ministry, the portfolio he held till April 2002.

In 2000, Paswan broke from the Janata Dal, to form the Lok Janshakti Party (LJP). He resigned as minister and left the ruling NDA in 2002 after developing differences with BJP. Following the 2004 Lok Sabha elections, Paswan joined the United Progressive Alliance government and was made the Union Minister in Ministry of Chemicals and Fertilizers and Ministry of Steel.

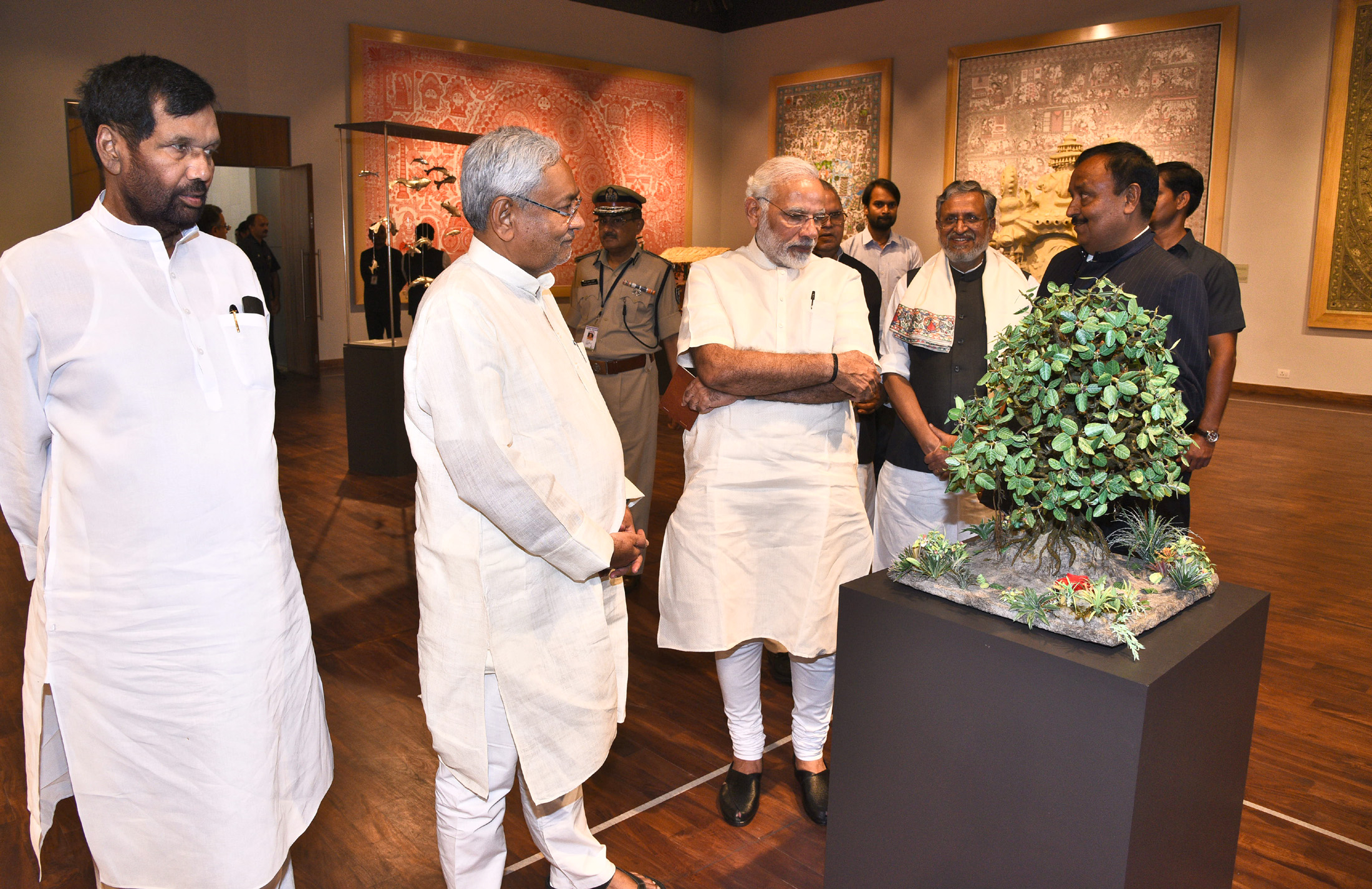
Ramvilas Paswan (extreme left), with Nitish Kumar (centre) and Narendra Modi, inspecting the inaugural Bihar Museum.

In the February 2005 Bihar State elections, Paswan's party LJP along with the Indian National Congress contested the election. The result was that no particular party or alliance could form a government by itself. However, Paswan consistently refused to support either Lalu Prasad Yadav, whom he accused of being extremely corrupt, or the right-wing National Democratic Alliance thereby creating a stalemate. This stalemate was broken when Nitish Kumar succeeded in persuading 12 members of Paswan's party to defect; to prevent the formation of a government supported by LJP defectors, the Governor of Bihar, Buta Singh dissolved the state legislature and called for fresh elections, keeping Bihar under President's Rule. In the November 2005 Bihar state elections, Paswan's third-alliance was utterly devastated; the Laloo Yadav-Congress alliance reduced to a minority and the NDA formed the new government.

Paswan has declared that the Bihar state elections have no influence on the Central Government, which will continue with both him and Laloo Yadav as ministers. Paswan has served as a Union Minister under five different Prime Ministers and continuously held a cabinet berth in all the Council of Ministers formed since 1996 (as of 2015). He was also part of all the national coalitions (the United Front, the National Democratic Alliance and the United Progressive Alliance), which have formed the Indian Government from 1996 to 2015.

=== 2009 Indian general election ===
For the 2009 Indian general election Paswan forged an alliance with Lalu Prasad Yadav and his Rashtriya Janata Dal, while dumping their erstwhile coalition partner and leader of the United Progressive Alliance, the Indian National Congress from the new alliance. The duo was later joined by Mulayam Singh's Samajwadi Party and were declared the Fourth Front. Paswan lost the elections from Hajipur to the Janata Dal's Ram Sundar Das, a former chief minister of Bihar for the first time in 33 years. His party the Lok Janshakti Party was not able to win any seats in the 15th Lok Sabha, while his coalition partner Yadav and his party too failed to perform well and were reduced to 4 seats.

=== 2010 assembly election ===
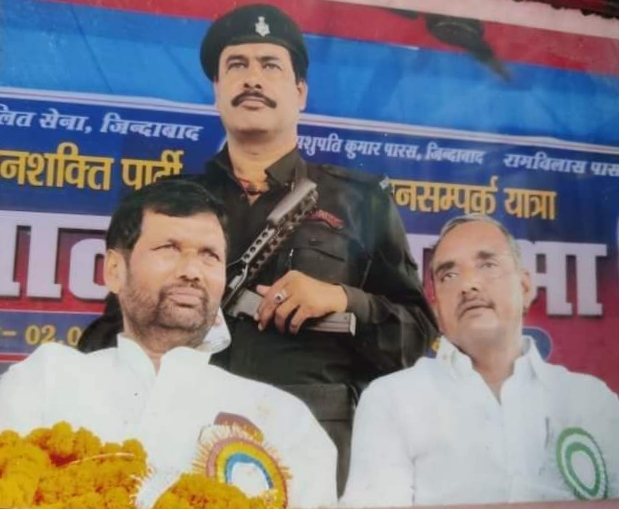
Paswan sitting with L.J.P. candidate Kapildev Singh from Asthawan in Nalanda during 2010 Bihar elections

Before the assembly elections to be held in 2010, Paswan was elected to the Rajya Sabha from the assembly, Ram Vilas Paswan and Lalu fought the 2010 Bihar election together and also claimed to form the government in Bihar with two-thirds majority. They termed the Nitish B.J.P. government that has been running for 5 years as ineffective and accused Nitish of taking Bihar into trouble. The work of taking has been done due to which Bihar has lagged further behind. Accusing the N.D.A., he said that 30 percent of the voters in Bihar are fake and the government is also behind this. Lalu's party RJD and Ram Vilas had fought this election together in alliance, in which L.J.P. fielded its candidates on 75 seats, while only 3 candidates could win, and could not even save the deposit on many seats. This performance of the party was less than the last election of 2005 Bihar election. The condition of the alliance was such that only 22 candidates could win for RJD. Seeing such poor performance of the party, Paswan and Lalu's Dalit, Muslim and backward politics took a new dimension.

=== 2014 Indian general election ===
Paswan was elected as member of 16th Lok Sabha after the 2014 Indian general election from Hajipur constituency when he contested in alliance with BJP, while his son Chirag Paswan won from Jamui constituency also in Bihar.

Paswan was again given charge of the Ministry of Consumer Affairs, Food and Public Distribution in May 2014, which continued in Second Modi ministry in 2019. He was elected to Rajya Sabha in 2019 with the help of BJP though his own party had only 2 MLAs in the state assembly.

== Elections ==
| From | To | Position | Constituency |
|---|---|---|---|
| 1969 | 1972 | MLA in the 5th Bihar Assembly | Alauli |
| 1977 | 1980 | MP (1st term) in 6th Lok Sabha | Hajipur |
| 1980 | 1984 | MP (2nd term) in 7th Lok Sabha | Hajipur |
| 1989 | 1991 | MP (3rd term) in 9th Lok Sabha | Hajipur |
| 1991 | 1996 | MP (4th term) in 10th Lok Sabha | Rosera |
| 1996 | 1998 | MP (5th term) in 11th Lok Sabha | Hajipur |
| 1998 | 1999 | MP (6th term) in 12th Lok Sabha | Hajipur |
| 1999 | 2004 | MP (7th term) in 13th Lok Sabha | Hajipur |
| 2004 | 2009 | MP (8th term) in 14th Lok Sabha | Hajipur |
| 2010 | 2014 | MP (1st term) in Rajya Sabha | Bihar |
| 2014 | 2019 | MP (9th term) in 16th Lok Sabha | Hajipur |
| 2019 | 2020 | MP (2nd term) in Rajya Sabha | Bihar |

=== Lok Sabha ===
| Year | Constituency | Party | Votes | % | Opponent | Opponent Party | Opponent Votes | % | Result | Margin | % |
|---|---|---|---|---|---|---|---|---|---|---|---|
| 2014 | Hajipur | LJP | 455,652 | 50.31 | Sanjeev Prasad Toni | INC | 230,152 | 25.41 | Won | 225,500 | 24.9 |
| 2009 | Hajipur | LJP | 208,761 | 37.61 | Ram Sundar Das | JD(U) | 246,715 | 44.44 | Lost | -37,954 | -6.83 |
| 2004 | Hajipur | LJP | 477,495 | 61.72 | Chhedi Paswan | JD(U) | 239,694 | 30.98 | Won | 237,801 | 30.74 |
| 1999 | Hajipur | JD(U) | 434,609 | 55.75 | Ramai Ram | RJD | 329,105 | 42.21 | Won | 105,504 | 13.54 |
| 1998 | Hajipur | JD | 486,350 | 60.58 | Ram Sundar Das | SJP(R) | 308,789 | 38.46 | Won | 177,561 | 22.12 |
| 1996 | Hajipur | JD | 387,781 | 51.59 | Ram Sundar Das | SAP | 341,550 | 45.44 | Won | 46,231 | 6.15 |
| 1991 | Rosera | JD | 373,710 | 62.3 | Ashok Kumar | INC | 113,226 | 18.88 | Won | 260,484 | 43.42 |
| 1989 | Hajipur | JD | 615,219 | 84.08 | Mahabir Paswan | INC(I) | 110,681 | 15.13 | Won | 504,538 | 68.95 |
| 1984 | Hajipur | LKD | 263,509 | 44.89 | Ram Ratan Ram | INC | 314,725 | 53.61 | Lost | -51,216 | -8.72 |
| 1980 | Hajipur | JP(S) | 266,428 | 57.77 | Medni Paswan | JP | 120,589 | 26.15 | Won | 145,839 | 31.62 |
| 1977 | Hajipur | JP | 469,007 | 89.3 | Baleshwar Ram | INC | 44,462 | 8.47 | Won | 424,545 | 80.83 |

=== Rajya Sabha ===
| Position | Party | Constituency | From | To | Tenure |
|---|---|---|---|---|---|
| Member of Parliament, Rajya Sabha (1st Term) | LJP | Bihar | 8 July 2010 | 16 May 2014 | 3 years, 312 days |
| Member of Parliament, Rajya Sabha (2nd Term) | LJP | Bihar | 29 June 2019 | 8 October 2020 | 1 year, 101 days |

== Personal life ==
Paswan married Rajkumari Devi in the 1960s. In 2014, he disclosed that he had divorced her in 1981, after his Lok Sabha nomination papers were challenged. Paswan had two daughters from first wife, Usha and Asha. In 1983, he married Reena Sharma, an air hostess. They had a son and a daughter. His son Chirag Kumar Paswan is an actor-turned-politician.

He was often called a dynast. He brought his brothers Pashupati Kumar Paras and Ram Chandra Paswan into politics. Of the six seats that the LJP won in 2019, three were from his family – son Chirag, and brothers Pashupati Kumar Paras and Ram Chandra Paswan. Ram Chandra's son Prince Raj succeeded his father upon his death.

== Death ==
Paswan died on 8 October 2020, and his death was confirmed by his son, Chirag Paswan. Paswan had undergone heart surgery and was hospitalised for a few weeks prior to his death. Paswan was cremated in Patna on 10 October 2020. His body was brought to Janardan Ghat in the Digha locality from his residence in Shri Krishna Puri, about 3 km away, for the last rites.

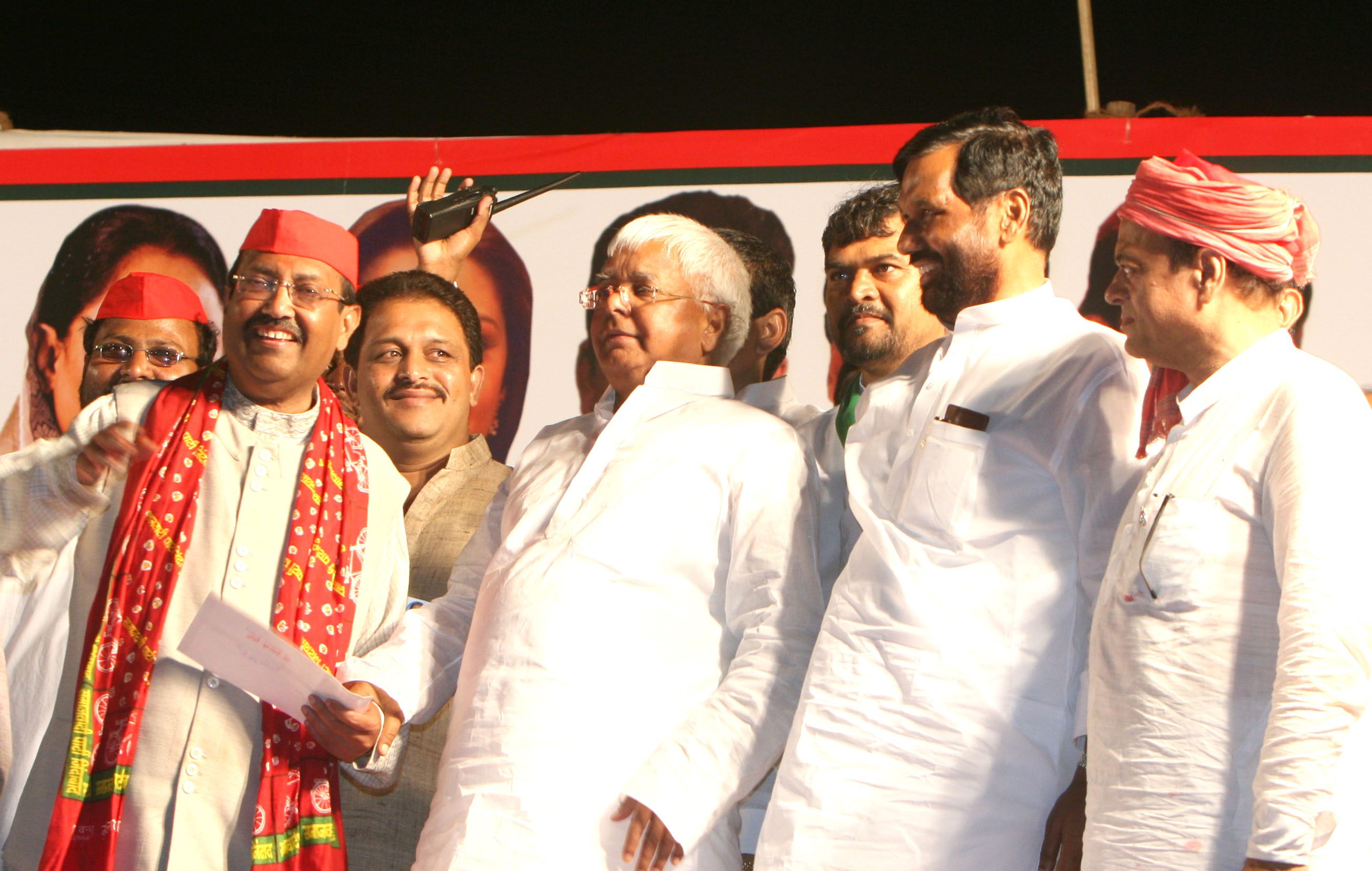
Paswan together with Lalu Prasad Yadav (center) and Amar Singh (left) at a party rally in Mumbai during the 2009 general elections.

Prime Minister Narendra Modi went to Paswan's Delhi residence to pay homage to him. Also, senior leader and former Chief Minister of Uttar Pradesh, Mulayam Singh Yadav paid tribute to him.

Political offices
Lok Sabha
| Preceded by Ramshekhar Prasad Singh | Member of Parliament for Hajipur; 1977 – 1984 | Succeeded by Ram Ratan Ram |
| Preceded by Ram Ratan Ram | Member of Parliament for Hajipur; 1989 – 1991 | Succeeded by Ram Sundar Das |
| Preceded by Dasai Chowdhary | Member of Parliament for Rosera; 1991 – 1996 | Succeeded by Pitambar Paswan |
| Preceded by Ram Sundar Das | Member of Parliament for Hajipur; 1996 – 2009 | Succeeded by Ram Sundar Das |
| Preceded by Ram Sundar Das | Member of Parliament for Hajipur; 2014 – 2019 | Succeeded by Pashupati Kumar Paras |
Political offices
| Preceded by C. K. Jaffer Sharief | Minister of Railways; 1 June 1996 – 19 March 1998 | Succeeded by Nitish Kumar |
| Preceded by Atal Bihari Vajpayee | Minister of Communications and Information Technology; 13 October 1999 – 1 September 2001 | Succeeded by Pramod Mahajan |
| Preceded by Sunder Lal Patwa | Minister of Mines; 1 September 2001 – 29 April 2002 | Succeeded by Uma Bharti |
| Preceded by Sunder Lal Patwa | Minister of Chemicals and Fertilizers; 23 May 2004 – 22 May 2009 | Succeeded by M. K. Alagiri |
| Preceded by K. V. Thomas; Minister of State (Independent Charge) | Minister of Consumer Affairs, Food and Public Distribution; 26 May 2014 – 8 October 2020 | Succeeded by Piyush Goyal |
Party political offices
| Preceded by Vacant | Leader of the Lok Jan Shakti Party in the Lok Sabha; 2014 – 2019 | Succeeded by Chirag Paswan |
