= Pitambar Paswan =

Indian politician

Member of Parliament, Lok Sabha
- In office 1996-1999
- Preceded by: Ram Vilas Paswan
- Succeeded by: Ram Chandra Paswan
- Constituency: Rosera, Bihar

Personal details
- Born: 21 October 1950 (age 75)
- Party: Rashtriya Janata Dal
- Other political affiliations: Janata Dal
- Spouse: Rajkumari

Pitambar Paswan is an Indian politician. He was elected to the Lok Sabha, the lower house of the Parliament of India from the Rosera in Bihar as a member of the Rashtriya Janata Dal.
