= Ram Sewak Hazari =

Indian politician (1936–2012)

Member of Parliament, Lok Sabha
- In office 1977-1980
- Preceded by: Ram Bhagat Paswan
- Succeeded by: Baleshwar Ram
- Constituency: Rosera, Bihar

Personal details
- Born: 1936
- Died: 27 October 2012 (aged 75)
- Party: Janata Party
- Spouse: Swarni Devi

Ram Sewak Hazari (1936 – 27 October 2012) was an Indian politician. He was elected to the Lok Sabha, the lower house of the Parliament of India from Rosera, Bihar as a member of the Janata Party.
