= Lok Janshakti Party =

Defunct political party in India

- Abbreviation: LJP
- Founder: Ram Vilas Paswan
- Founded: 28 November 2000 (25 years ago)
- Dissolved: 5 October 2021 (5 years ago)
- Split from: Janata Dal
- Succeeded by: Rashtriya Lok Janshakti Party; Lok Janshakti Party (Ram Vilas)
- Headquarters: 12, Janpath, New Delhi, India – 110011
- Political position: Centre
- Colours: Blue, red and green
- ECI status: State Party
- Alliance: National Democratic Alliance (2000—2003, 2014-2021); United Progressive Alliance (2004-14); Fourth Front (2009)

Election symbol
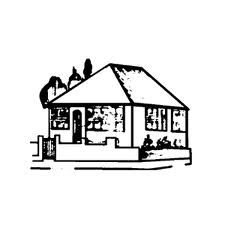

Party flag

The Lok Janshakti Party (LJP, lit. 'People's Manpower Party') was a state political party mainly based in the state of Bihar, India. The party was formed in 2000 when Ram Vilas Paswan split from Janata Dal. The party had a considerable following amongst Dalits in Bihar. The party has split into two parties: Rashtriya Lok Janshakti Party and Lok Janshakti Party (Ram Vilas).

== History ==
In 2000, late Ram Vilas Paswan formed the Lok Janshakti Party as its president. Along with Paswan, his brother, Ram Chandra Paswan, Capt. Jai Narain Prasad Nishad and Ramesh Jigajinagi also joined the party.

LJP contested the polls in alliance with the Indian National Congress and the Rashtriya Janata Dal (RJD) and won four Lok Sabha seats. Ram Vilas Paswan remained a Union Minister in Ministry of Chemicals and Fertilizers and Ministry of Steel.

In the 2005 Bihar assembly polls held in February, the party contested in alliance with the Congress and against the RJD and won 29 assembly seats. However no alliance could secure majority and the party refused to support any alliance to form the Government. In a controversial episode, President's rule was imposed in the State and after a few months Bihar's state assembly was dissolved. Elections were again held in October 2005 in which NDA came to power with a thumping majority with Nitish Kumar as the Chief Minister. The LPJ had fielded its candidates in 203 constituencies but could only win 10 seats.

The party contested the 2009 Lok Sabha General elections in an alliance called the Fourth Front, which constituted the Rashtriya Janata Dal, Lok Janshakti Party and the Samajwadi Party. This move proved to be disastrous, since LJP couldn't win a single seat, and RJD were reduced to 4 seats in the Lok Sabha. After the election Laloo Prasad Yadav, admitted that it was a mistake to leave the UPA, and gave unconditional support to Manmohan Singh and the newly formed UPA government.

Jan Morcha, the party founded by former Prime Minister Vishwanath Pratap Singh, merged with the LJP in March 2009. Jan Morcha president Ajeya Pratap Singh, son of Vishwanath Pratap Singh, was immediately appointed a senior LJP functionary.

Before the 2009 elections, the entire Jharkhand unit of LJP merged with Congress, complaining that Paswan had ignored them. Paswan then announced the dissolution of the party's Jharkhand Unit.

In 2010 Bihar Legislative Assembly election, the party had contested in an alliance with Rashtriya Janata Dal. However party could secure only 6.75% votes winning only 3 seats which was 7 less than the previous elections in 2006.

On 27 February 2014, Lok Janshakti Party officially announced it re-entering the National Democratic Alliance led by Bharatiya Janata Party, after a gap of 12 years. It contested 7 Lok Sabha seats from Bihar in the 2014 Indian general election, winning 6 of them. The winners included Ram Vilas Paswan and his son Chirag Paswan with the former also made Minister for Food and Civil Supplies in the NDA government.

In the 2015 Bihar Legislative Assembly election, the party contested in an alliance with BJP-led National Democratic Alliance. It contested 40 seats out of 243 in the assembly. It won only two seats, one less than the last election in 2010.

In 2017, Pashupati Paras brother of Ram Vilas was inducted into Nitish Kumar cabinet as Minister of Animal & Fish Resources after Janata Dal (United) joined BJP-led National Democratic Alliance.

== 2020 Bihar Assembly Elections ==
After the entry of Lok Janshakti Party in National Democratic Alliance in 2014, the NDA's principal parties in Bihar namely LJP, Bharatiya Janata Party and Rashtriya Lok Samta Party had contested against the JD(U) – Rashtriya Janata Dal-Indian National Congress Mahagathbandhan alliance in 2015 and further until 2020 Bihar Assembly Election. On the question of seat sharing for the 2020 Assembly elections, the LJP under the presidency of Chirag Paswan decided to quit NDA and fight on 143 Assembly seats alone. This turned out to be the single most important reason for the poor electoral performance of JD(U) led by Nitish Kumar. The Quint reported, if LJP would have formed a pre poll alliance with BJP, National Democratic Alliance would have won additional 38 seats.

The parliamentary committee of LJP however decided to support BJP in and outside the state with the number of seats they win in the state while contesting solely. The move as per party leadership was to oppose JD(U) while allying with the BJP. The way for the party was not easy as it was to face a number of coalitions and political parties which were contesting the elections with their support bases.

== Split in party ==
The crisis started when Pashupati Kumar Paras took 4 MPs of the party along with him and named himself as the party president. Then Chirag Paswan called a national executive meeting and removed the five rebel MPs from the party's primary membership.

The five MPs named Pashupati Kumar Paras (Hajipur), Mehboob Ali Qaisar (Khagaria), Chandan Singh (Nawada), Veena Devi (Vaishali) and Prince Raj (Samastipur) met Lok Sabha Speaker Om Birla next day saying that they have elected Paras as LJP parliamentary party leader and Kaiser as deputy leader. Later that night, the Lok Sabha Secretariat issued a circular confirming Paras as leader of the LJP in the Lok Sabha.

In his first reaction after his uncle Pashupati Paras ousted him, Paswan likened the organization to a mother who should not be betrayed. In a tweet, he said he made efforts to keep the party founded by his father Ram Vilas Paswan and his family together but failed.

ECI froze the Lok Janshakti Party name & Symbol Bungalow and allotted Lok Janshakti Party (Ram Vilas) led by Chirag Paswan and Rashtriya Lok Janshakti Party led by Pashupati Kumar Paras.

== Elections Contested ==
=== General Elections ===
Lok Sabha Elections
Year	Lok Sabha	Seats contested	Seats won	(±) in seats	% of votes	Vote swing	Popular vote	Outcome
2004	14th	8	4 / 40	4	8.19%	New entry	24,02,603	Government
2009	15th	12	0 / 40	▼4	6.54%	▼1.65	15,86,404	Others
2014	16th	7	6 / 40	▲6	6.40%	▼0.14	22,95,929	Government
2019	17th	6	6 / 40	Steady	8.01%	▲1.61	32,06,979	Government

=== Bihar Legislative Assembly ===
Bihar Legislative Assembly Elections
Year	Assembly	Seats contested	Seats won	(±) in seats	% of votes	Vote swing	Popular vote	Outcome
Feb. 2005	13th	178	29 / 243	29	12.62%	New entry	30,91,173	Opposition
Oct. 2005	14th	203	10 / 243	▼19	11.10%	▼1.52	26,15,901	Opposition
2010	15th	75	3 / 243	▼7	6.74%	▼4.36	19,57,232	Opposition
2015	16th	42	2 / 243	▼1	4.83%	▼1.91	18,40,834	Opposition
2020	17th	135	1 / 243	▼1	5.66%	▲0.83	23,83,739	Opposition
