= Plurals Party =

The Plurals Party
- Abbreviation: TPP
- President: Pushpam Priya Choudhary
- General Secretary: Anupam Kumar Suman
- Founder: Pushpam Priya Choudhary
- Founded: 2020; 6 years ago
- Headquarters: Sukhbaso Complex, 3rd Floor, Opposite Western Hotel, Plot No. 130, Danapur Khagaul Road, Patna, Bihar, 801503
- Student wing: Plurals Student Federation (PSF)
- Ideology: Progressivism; Liberalism; Decentralisation; Kantianism
- Colours: Red
- ECI status: Registered (13 October 2020)
- Seats in Legislative Assembly of Bihar: 0 / 243

Website
- plurals.org

The Plurals Party (often known by the abbreviated name Plurals or TPP) is an Indian political party founded in the state of Bihar by Pushpam Priya Choudhary, alumna of the London School of Economics and Institute of Development Studies, whose central policies include employment, education, healthcare, rural development, industrialisation, urban centres and capabilities inclusion of people and the regions. Plurals started its political journey by contesting 2020 Bihar Legislative Assembly election against the National Democratic Alliance of Bharatiya Janata Party and Janata Dal (United) and Grand Alliance of Rashtriya Janata Dal, Indian National Congress and several leftist parties.

== History ==
=== Formation ===
The party was founded on 8 March 2020 by Pushpam Priya Choudhary, who was projected by the party as Chief Minister candidate for 2020 Bihar Legislative Assembly election and former civil servant Anupam Kumar Suman who was posted as the special secretary of the Bihar Chief Minister Nitish Kumar before his resignation, who later joined as the General Secretary of the party.

== Election Campaign ==
Pushpam Priya Choudhary travelled across the state and raised the issues of closed industries, unproductive agriculture, ruined heritage and unemployment with the party campaign of "Let’s Open Bihar" and "30 Years Lockdown". She pointed out the underdevelopment of the state in the post-globalisation phase after 1990, which is also synchronised with the Lalu Prasad Yadav-Nitish Kumar regime.

The party released its manifesto titled "Bihar Total Transformation: 8 diśā 8 pahar" on 17 October 2020 signed by its president Pushpam Priya Choudhary, and which focussed on revolutionary development of the state.

=== Bihar Assembly Elections ===
The party made its electoral debut in the 2020 Bihar Legislative Assembly election and contested all 243 seats. As the party opposed the politics of caste and religion following its pluralistic ideology, it declared its candidate’s name while mentioning their profession (doctor, engineer, teacher etc) as their caste and their religion as ‘Bihari’. Many of the nominations of its candidates were rejected, which the party opposed vehemently. All party candidates who contested the elections lost, including party president Pushpam Priya Choudhary who contested from Bankipur and Bisfi constituencies. Party members finally contested on 148 seats including those declared independent because of the delay in party registration. Total vote secured by the candidates on these seats was 209,417.

== Party Candidates Performance 2020 ==
Sr. No.	AC Name	AC No.	Candidate name	Phase	Winner	Runner up	Plurals
1	Valmiki Nagar	1	Gaurav Jha	3	74906	53321	2863
2	Ramnagar (SC)	2	Champa Devi	3	75423	59627	1412
3	Narkatiaganj	3	Anup Kumar Mishra	3	75484	54350	959
4	Bagaha	4	Sita Shah	3	90013	59993	1032
5	Lauriya	5	Ajitesh Kumar	3	77927	48923	1462
6	Nautan	6	Jaiprakash Singh Kushwaha	2	78657	52761	1169
7	Chanpatia	7	Rajeev Ranjan	2	83828	70359	297
8	Bettiah	8	Awakash Gupta	2	84496	66417	1559
9	Sikta	9	Tamnna Khatun	3	49075	35798	2237
10	Raxaul	10	Kundan Kumar Srivastava	3	80979	44056	694
11	Govindganj	14	Manoranjan Kumar Mishra	3	65544	37620	481
12	Kesariya	15	Anu Vivek	2	40219	30992	619
13	Madhuban	18	Vikas Keshri	2	73179	67301	427
14	Motihari	19	Munna Kumar	2	92733	78088	662
15	Chiraia	20	Abhinav Bharti	2	62904	46030	1432
16	Dhaka	21	Rajan Jaiswal	2	99792	89678	875
17	Sheohar	22	Ranjeev Kumar Jha	2	73143	36457	1248
18	Riga	23	Ravi Kumar	3	95226	62731	634
19	Runnisaidpur	29	Vinay Kumar	2	73205	48576	919
20	Belsand	30	Rakesh Kumar Singh	2	49682	35997	912
21	Harlakhi	31	Mangesh Jha	3	60393	42800	3039
22	Benipatti	32	Anuradha Singh	3	78862	46210	1841
23	Khajauli	33	Kumar Chaitanya	3	83161	60472	1004
24	Babubarhi	34	Shalini Kumari	3	77367	65879	3413
25	Bisfi	35	Pushpam Priya Choudhary	3	86574	76333	1521
26	Madhubani	36	Madhubala Giri	2	71332	64518	2804
27	Rajnagar	37	Santosh Kumar Suman	2	89459	70338	1267
28	Jhanjharpur	38	Sanjeev Kumar Suman	2	94854	53066	600
29	Phulparas	39	Brajesh Kumar Kunwar	2	75116	64150	1278
30	Laukaha	40	Dinesh Gupta	3	78523	68446	6319
31	Nirmali	41	Dhiraj Kumar	3	92439	48517	1153
32	Pipra	42	Rajesh Kumar	3	82388	63143	2923
33	Chhatapur	45	Bhashkar Kumar Mishra	3	93755	73120	435
34	Narpatganj	46	Nishant Kumar Jha	3	98397	69787	511
35	Forbesganj	48	Rupesh Raj	3	102212	82510	676
36	Araria	49	Amit Anand Jha	3	103054	55118	1802
37	Kasba	58	Hayat Ashraf	3	77410	60132	1581
38	Banmankhi	59	Krishna Kumari	3	93594	65851	998
39	Dhamdaha	61	Maneesh Kumar Yadav	3	97057	63463	2523
40	Purnea	62	Anisha Prity	3	97757	65603	613
41	Kadwa	64	Manish Kumar Mandal	3	71267	38865	970
42	Manihari	67	Shobha Soren	3	83032	61823	1840
43	Barari	68	Tanuja Khatun	3	81752	71314	1172
44	Alamnagar	70	Abhishek Anand	3	102517	73837	1182
45	Bihariganj	71	Jayant Kumar	3	81531	62820	590
46	Madhepura	73	Lalan Kumar	3	79839	64767	2825
47	Sonbarsa	74	Amir Ram	3	67678	54212	1037
48	Saharsa	75	Rajesh Kumar Jha	3	103538	83859	845
49	Mahishi	77	Tripurari Prasad Singh	3	66316	64686	503
50	Gaura Bauram	79	Kamlesh Ray	2	59538	52258	635
51	Bahadurpur	85	Priyanka Singh	3	68538	65909	811
52	Keoti	86	Madhav Kumar Chaudhary	3	76372	71246	257
53	Gaighat	88	Subodh Kumar Singh	3	59778	52212	2260
54	Aurai	89	Ritesh Kumar	3	90479	42613	1380
55	Bochaha	91	Abhimanyu Kumar	3	77837	66569	1604
56	Kurhani	93	Salvi Saloni	3	78549	77837	1699
57	Muzaffarpur	94	Pallavi Sinha	3	81871	75545	3522
58	Kanti	95	Mala Sinha	2	64458	54144	1273
59	Baruraj	96	Dilip Kumar	2	87407	43753	344
60	Paroo	97	Monalisa	2	77392	62694	434
61	Sahebganj	98	Meera Kaumudi	2	81203	65870	1599
62	Baikunthpur	99	Atul Kumar Gautam	2	67807	56694	1073
63	Gopalganj	101	Vivek Kumar Choubey	2	77791	41039	2165
64	Kuchaikote	102	Ajeet Kumar Choubey	2	74359	53729	531
65	Bhore	103	Bishal Kumar Bharati	2	74067	73605	3352
66	Siwan	105	Rameshwar Kumar	2	76785	74812	1552
67	Ziradei	106	Markandey Kumar Upadhyay	2	69442	43932	795
68	Darauli	107	Kumar Shashi Ranjan	2	81065	68948	2521
69	Goriakothi	111	Jitesh Kumar Singh	2	87368	75477	327
70	Maharajganj	112	Omprakash Sharma	2	48825	46849	2185
71	Ekma	113	Manish Manoranjan	2	53875	39948	818
72	Baniapur	115	Chikki Kumari	2	65194	33082	1156
73	Parsa	121	Akhilesh Kumar	2	68316	51023	1174
74	Sonpur	122	Asha Kumari	2	73247	66561	912
75	Hajipur	123	Santosh Kumar Shukla	2	85552	82562	371
76	Vaishali	125	Nilesh Ranjan	2	69780	62367	766
77	Mahua	126	Amresh Kumar	3	62580	48893	2103
78	Mahnar	129	Rajnish Paswan	2	61721	53774	949
79	Patepur	130	Shivji Rajak	3	86509	60670	576
80	Warisnagar	132	Kirti King	3	68356	23292	1955
81	Samastipur	133	Vinay Kumar Prasad	3	68507	63793	665
82	Ujiarpur	134	Vineet Kumar	2	90601	67333	599
83	Morwa	135	Umashankar thakur	3	59554	48883	1955
84	Sarairanjan	136	Navin Kumar	3	72666	69042	672
85	Bibhutipur	138	Prabhu Narain Jha	2	73822	33326	552
86	Rosera	139	Randhir Kumar Paswan	2	87163	51419	693
87	Cheria Bariyarpur	141	Madhu Shweta	2	68635	27738	650
88	Bachhwara	142	Satyajeet	2	54738	54254	494
89	Teghra	143	Rupam Kumari	2	85229	37250	658
90	Matihani	144	Bindu Kumari	2	61364	61031	893
91	Sahebpur Kamal	145	Kaushal Kishor Singh	2	64888	50663	987
92	Begusarai	146	Bhaskar Kumar	2	74217	69663	913
93	Bakhri	147	Sanjay Kumar	2	72177	71400	1278
94	Alauli	148	Ratan Bihari	2	47183	44410	768
95	Khagaria	149	Sanjeev Kumar	2	46980	43980	517
96	Parbatta	150	Ratna Priya	2	77226	76275	585
97	Beldaur	150	Suraj Kumar	2	56541	51433	854
98	Bihpur	152	Nidhi Bhushan	2	72938	66809	522
99	Pirpainti	154	Dilip Kumar	2	96229	69210	724
100	Kahalgaon	155	Bijay Kumar Yadav	1	115538	72645	3107
101	Bhagalpur	156	Amit Alok	2	65502	64389	719
102	Sultanganj	157	Kiran Mishra	1	72823	61258	1303
103	Nathnagar	158	Asha Kumari	2	78832	71076	739
104	Amarpur	159	Ajay Singh	1	54308	51194	1331
105	Dhouraiya	160	Puja Kumari	1	78646	75959	2252
106	Banka	161	Kashikant Singh	1	69762	52934	667
107	Belhar	163	Swati Kumari	1	73589	71116	4026
108	Tarapur	164	Ravi Ranjan Kumar Suraj	1	64468	57243	1364
109	Munger	165	Shalini Kumari	1	75573	74329	4497
110	Jamalpur	166	Priya Rai	1	57196	52764	907
111	Lakhisarai	168	Sudhir Kumar	1	74212	63729	2331
112	Islampur	174	Dayanand Prasad	2	68088	64390	596
113	Hilsa	175	Rajiv Nayan	2	61848	61836	659
114	Nalanda	176	Suvant Rao	2	66066	49989	699
115	Harnaut	177	Chandra Uday	2	65404	38163	776
116	Barh	179	Raj Kumari	1	49327	39087	1393
117	Bakhtiarpur	180	Kundan Kumar	2	89483	68811	639
118	Digha	181	Shambhavi	2	97044	50971	4701
119	Bankipur	182	Pushpam Priya Choudhary	2	83068	44032	5189
120	Kumhrar	183	Kumar Raunak	2	81400	54937	1248
121	Patna Sahib	184	Daya Singh	2	97692	79392	1031
122	Fatuha	185	Ajeet Kumar Singh	2	85769	66399	610
123	Danapur	186	Amarnath Ray	2	89895	73971	1449
124	Phulwari	188	Ravi Kumar	2	91124	77267	1679
125	Bikram	191	Dr. Mamtamayi Priyadarshini	1	86177	50717	3068
126	Shahpur	198	Avinash Kumar Chandra	1	64393	41510	2060
127	Brahmpur	199	Niranjan Kumar Singh	1	90176	39035	925
128	Ramgarh	203	Indresh Singh	1	58083	56084	510
129	Mohania	204	Sonu Kumari	1	61235	49181	864
130	Bhabua	205	Krishna Kant Tiwari	1	57561	47516	669
131	Chainpur	206	Rituraj Patel	1	95245	70951	847
132	Sasaram	208	Amla Tripathi	1	83303	56880	1476
133	Dehri	212	Prem Prakash	1	64567	64103	983
134	Arwal	214	Anita Kumari	1	68286	48336	1498
135	Kurtha	215	Abdullah Jamal Mallik	1	54227	26417	1499
136	Makhdumpur	218	Mukesh Dayal	1	71571	49006	1140
137	Nabinagar	221	Sanju Devi	1	64943	44822	1589
138	Kutumba	222	Satyendra Ram	1	50822	34169	2863
139	Aurangabad	223	Sanjeev Kumar Singh	1	70018	67775	2610
140	Barachatti	228	Arjun Bhuyian	1	72491	66173	3836
141	Bodh Gaya	229	Pramila Kumari	1	80926	76218	3593
142	Gaya Town	230	Alka Singh	1	66932	55034	1153
143	Tikari	231	Raushan Kumar Singh	1	70359	67729	1151
144	Belaganj	232	Gita Devi	1	79708	55745	2635
145	Wazirganj	234	Vandana Singh	1	70713	48283	2123
146	Nawada	237	Bablu Kumar urf Ishan Narayan	1	72435	46125	540
147	Gobindpur	238	Dayanand Prasad	1	79557	46483	735
148	Chakai	243	Rahul Kumar	1	44967	39319	1902

== 2020 Bihar Legislative Assembly election ==
Assembly term	Election	Seats contested	Seats won	% of votes	Ref.
17th Bihar Assembly	2020	113 (excluding 35 IND)	0		

== 2025 Bihar Legislative Assembly election ==
The Plurals Party has announced that it will contest the 2025 Bihar Legislative Assembly Elections on all 243 seats. The Party is currently allotted Whistle as their election symbol.

== See also ==
- List of political parties in India
