= Bakhri Buzurg =

Bakhri Buzurg Bakhari
- Village
- Country: India
- State: Bihar
- District: Samastipur
- Parliamentary constituency: Ujiarpur
- Assembly constituency: Sarairanjan (Vidhan Sabha constituency)
- Time zone: UTC+5.30 (IST)
- PIN: 848132
- Area code: STD Code 06274
- Website: samastipur.bih.nic.in

Bakhri Buzurg is a village in Bihar, India. As of 2011 census, Bakhri Buzurg had a population of 2794.

== Transport ==
Bakhri Buzurg is located 77 kilometers from the state capital Patna (75 minutes driving distance). The nearest airport is Darbhanga Airport which is 50 kilometers away from Bakhri Buzurg. Lok Nayak Jayaprakash Narayan International Airport, Patna Airport, is 80 kilometers from Bakhri Buzurg. Nearest Railway Station is Samastipur Junction which is a major railway station, which connects the town to major and minor cities in India. Nearest bus stop is Musrigharari bus stop which is 1.5 km from Bakhri Buzurg. The Samastipur Railway Station is 8.5 km from Bakhri Buzurg. There are different modes of transport for travelling local area which includes Buses, Auto-rikshaw, Rikshaw, Battery operated Auto-Rickshaw. It also connects nearby state capitals by sleeper buses.

== Places of interest ==
Bakhri Buzurg is located at an approximate distance of 1.5 km from Musrigharari on NH28 and NH103. This place is known for the celebration of Muharram and Durga Puja. Thousands of people gather for the celebration of Muharram and Durga Puja.

There is a temple of Goddess Kali, popularly known as "Kali Mandir", situated nearly in the eastern side of the village which has been made by the villagers contribution and also a jama masjid situated at border of the village which is known as "AILOTH - BAKHRI JAMA MASJID". Generally the popular celebration of the village occurs in front of the temple.

== Language ==
The most common language spoken in Bakhri Buzurg is Maghi, Urdu, Hindi, Maithili and English are used generally for official or diplomatic use. "Thethi", a local language, which is a subset language derived from Hindi is being spoken mostly for unofficial purpose.

== Education ==
Bakhri Buzurg has one middle-level school
