= List of constituencies of the Bihar Legislative Assembly =

Bihar Legislative Assembly
- 18th Bihar Assembly

Type
- Type: Lower house of the Bihar Legislature
- Term limits: 5 years
- Seats: 243

Elections
- Voting system: First past the post
- Last election: November 2025

Meeting place
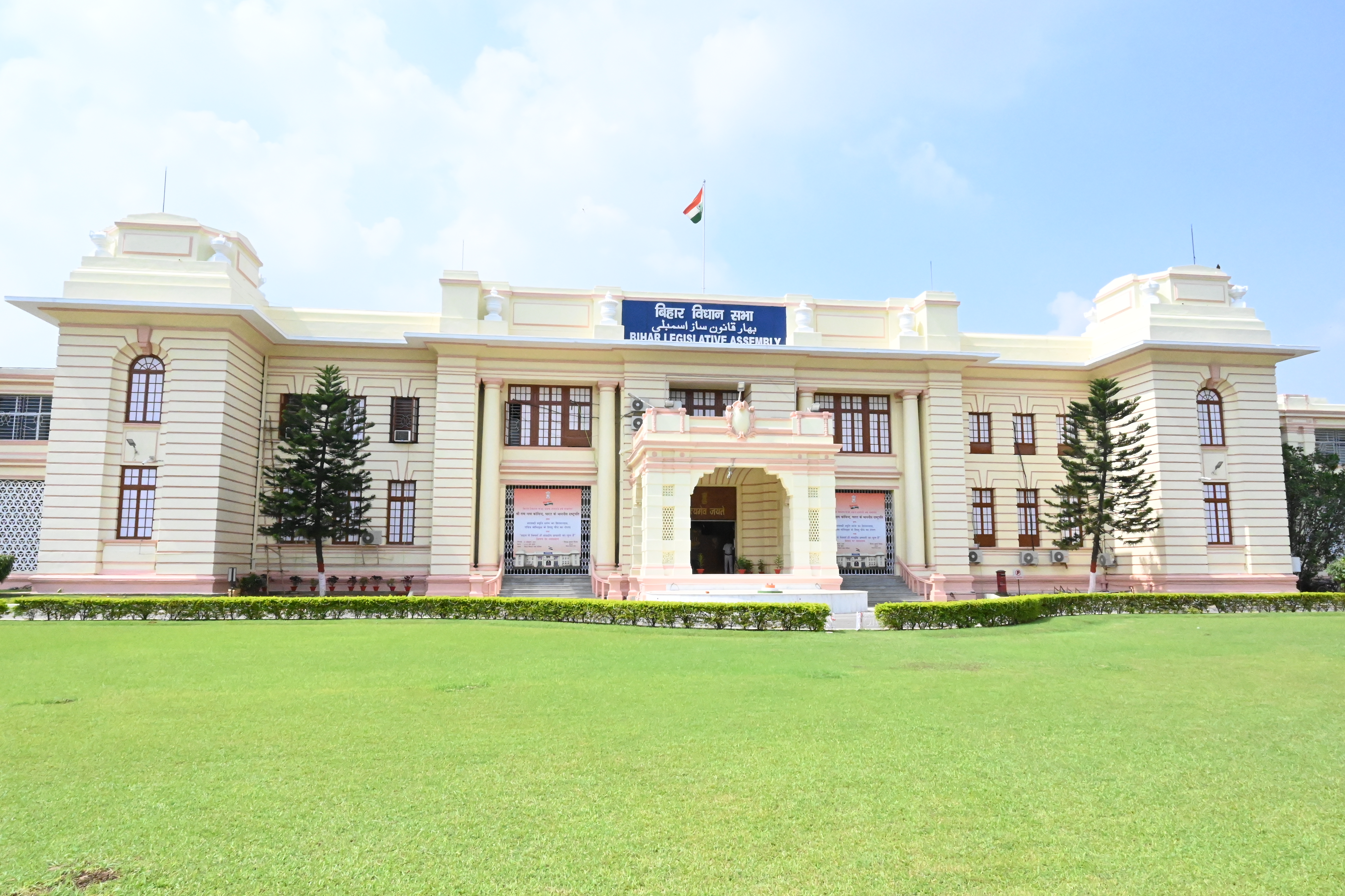
- Bihar State Assembly, Patna

Website
- vidhansabha.bih.nic.in

Location of Bihar (in red) within India

The Bihar Legislative Assembly is the lower house of the bicameral legislature of the state of Bihar in Eastern India. Its seat is at Patna, the capital of the state, and it sits for a term of five years unless it is dissolved early. (Note: A Legislative Assembly can be dissolved early, under Article 174 of the Indian Constitution, in a few situations including a hung assembly and the inability of any alliance to form a majority.) Bihar is India's second largest state by population and the twelfth largest by area. The assembly was created in 1937 as an outcome of the split of the Bihar and Orissa Province, after the passage of the Government of India Act, 1935. The Bihar Legislative Assembly has had 18 terms since independence. After the latest election in 2025, the assembly is dominated by the governing National Democratic Alliance, which won 202 out of the 243 seats. Rashtriya Janata Dal, the largest opposition party, has 25 seats.

Constituency boundaries are periodically redrawn by the delimitation commission which tries to keep them as geographically compact areas, and with due consideration to existing boundaries of administrative units. The latest census is used to draw the boundaries and every assembly constituency has to be completely within a parliamentary constituency. Since 2000, the Bihar Assembly has had 243 single-seat constituencies, each of which directly elects a representative based on a first past the post election.

Since the independence of India from the United Kingdom in 1947, the Scheduled Castes (SC) and Scheduled Tribes (ST) have been given reservation status, guaranteeing political representation, and the Constitution lays down the general principles of positive discrimination for SCs and STs. According to the 2011 census of India the Scheduled Castes constitute 15.9%, while the Scheduled Tribes constitute 1.3% of the population of the state. The Scheduled Castes have been granted a reservation of 38 seats in the assembly, while 2 constituencies are reserved for candidates of the Scheduled Tribes.

== History ==
Changes in the constituencies of the Bihar Legislative Assembly
Year	Act/Order	Explanation	Total seats	SC-reserved seats	ST-reserved seats	Election(s)
1950, 1951	Delimitation of Parliamentary and Assembly Constituencies Order, 1951	The Indian Constitution came into effect and new constituencies were created.	276	0	24	1952
1956	States Reorganisation Act, 1956	Some parts of Bihar were transferred to West Bengal.	264	39	29	1957
1961	Delimitation of Parliamentary and Assembly Constituencies Order, 1961	There were changes in the number and reservation status of constituencies. Two-member constituencies were abolished.	318	40	32	1962
1966	Delimitation of Parliamentary and Assembly Constituencies Order, 1966	There were changes to the number of seats reserved for SC and ST candidates.	318	45	29	1967; 1969, 1972
1976	Delimitation of Parliamentary and Assembly Constituencies Order, 1976	There were changes in the number and reservation status of constituencies.	324	46	28	1977, 1980, 1985, 1990, 1995, 2000
2000	Bihar Reorganisation Act, 2000	The new state of Jharkhand was created from the southern parts of Bihar. There were 324 assembly constituencies in undivided Bihar. After the split, 243 of them composed the reduced legislative assembly of the state.	243	39	0	2005 (February), 2005 (October)
2008	Delimitation Commission Order, 2008	There were changes in the reservation status and area covered by constituencies.	243	38	2	2010, 2015, 2020, 2025

== Constituencies ==
The constituencies of Bihar with their reservation status indicated by colour

Reservation
Scheduled Castes (SC)
Scheduled Tribes (ST)

Constituencies of the Bihar Legislative Assembly
No.	Name	Reservation	District	Lok Sabha constituency	Electorate (2025)
1	Valmiki Nagar	None	West Champaran	Valmiki Nagar	331,447
2	Ramnagar	SC	West Champaran	Valmiki Nagar	299,784
3	Narkatiaganj	None	West Champaran	Valmiki Nagar	277,575
4	Bagaha	None	West Champaran	Valmiki Nagar	318,191
5	Lauriya	None	West Champaran	Valmiki Nagar	252,171
6	Nautan	None	West Champaran	Paschim Champaran	286,639
7	Chanpatia	None	West Champaran	Paschim Champaran	294,526
8	Bettiah	None	West Champaran	Paschim Champaran	292,087
9	Sikta	None	West Champaran	Valmiki Nagar	278,251
10	Raxaul	None	East Champaran	Paschim Champaran	286,131
11	Sugauli	None	East Champaran	Paschim Champaran	283,696
12	Narkatiya	None	East Champaran	Paschim Champaran	301,008
13	Harsidhi	SC	East Champaran	Purvi Champaran	274,415
14	Govindganj	None	East Champaran	Purvi Champaran	264,744
15	Kesaria	None	East Champaran	Purvi Champaran	260,633
16	Kalyanpur	None	East Champaran	Purvi Champaran	256,338
17	Pipra	None	East Champaran	Purvi Champaran	336,303
18	Madhuban	None	East Champaran	Sheohar	265,505
19	Motihari	None	East Champaran	Purvi Champaran	292,635
20	Chiraia	None	East Champaran	Sheohar	289,283
21	Dhaka	None	East Champaran	Sheohar	335,844
22	Sheohar	None	Sheohar	Sheohar	304,871
23	Riga	None	Sitamarhi	Sheohar	317,263
24	Bathnaha	SC	Sitamarhi	Sitamarhi	318,190
25	Parihar	None	Sitamarhi	Sitamarhi	324,889
26	Sursand	None	Sitamarhi	Sitamarhi	316,116
27	Bajpatti	None	Sitamarhi	Sitamarhi	333,004
28	Sitamarhi	None	Sitamarhi	Sitamarhi	305,766
29	Runnisaidpur	None	Sitamarhi	Sitamarhi	287,491
30	Belsand	None	Sitamarhi	Sheohar	261,773
31	Harlakhi	None	Madhubani	Madhubani	276,152
32	Benipatti	None	Madhubani	Madhubani	290,195
33	Khajauli	None	Madhubani	Jhanjharpur	293,616
34	Babubarhi	None	Madhubani	Jhanjharpur	308,096
35	Bisfi	None	Madhubani	Madhubani	328,813
36	Madhubani	None	Madhubani	Madhubani	339,367
37	Rajnagar	SC	Madhubani	Jhanjharpur	313,288
38	Jhanjharpur	None	Madhubani	Jhanjharpur	320,142
39	Phulparas	None	Madhubani	Jhanjharpur	320,615
40	Laukaha	None	Madhubani	Jhanjharpur	336,961
41	Nirmali	None	Supaul	Supaul	304,066
42	Pipra	None	Supaul	Supaul	305,165
43	Supaul	None	Supaul	Supaul	293,575
44	Triveniganj	SC	Supaul	Supaul	304,346
45	Chhatapur	None	Supaul	Supaul	333,518
46	Narpatganj	None	Araria	Araria	336,584
47	Raniganj	SC	Araria	Araria	342,519
48	Forbesganj	None	Araria	Araria	360,102
49	Araria	None	Araria	Araria	334,656
50	Jokihat	None	Araria	Araria	303,837
51	Sikti	None	Araria	Araria	302,777
52	Bahadurganj	None	Kishanganj	Kishanganj	292,251
53	Thakurganj	None	Kishanganj	Kishanganj	301,120
54	Kishanganj	None	Kishanganj	Kishanganj	283,172
55	Kochadhaman	None	Kishanganj	Kishanganj	250,697
56	Amour	None	Purnia	Kishanganj	312,866
57	Baisi	None	Purnia	Kishanganj	286,869
58	Kasba	None	Purnia	Purnia	287,959
59	Banmankhi	SC	Purnia	Purnia	302,101
60	Rupauli	None	Purnia	Purnia	298,673
61	Dhamdaha	None	Purnia	Purnia	314,949
62	Purnia	None	Purnia	Purnia	290,893
63	Katihar	None	Katihar	Katihar	262,016
64	Kadwa	None	Katihar	Katihar	280,637
65	Balrampur	None	Katihar	Katihar	348,537
66	Pranpur	None	Katihar	Katihar	313,606
67	Manihari	ST	Katihar	Katihar	297,676
68	Barari	None	Katihar	Katihar	279,756
69	Korha	SC	Katihar	Purnia	298,867
70	Alamnagar	None	Madhepura	Madhepura	360,264
71	Bihariganj	None	Madhepura	Madhepura	327,455
72	Singheshwar	SC	Madhepura	Supaul	329,826
73	Madhepura	None	Madhepura	Madhepura	345,596
74	Sonbarsha	SC	Saharsa	Madhepura	302,061
75	Saharsa	None	Saharsa	Madhepura	370,709
76	Simri Bakhtiarpur	None	Saharsa	Khagaria	336,967
77	Mahishi	None	Saharsa	Madhepura	288,096
78	Kusheshwar Asthan	SC	Darbhanga	Samastipur	259,912
79	Gaura Bauram	None	Darbhanga	Darbhanga	261,738
80	Benipur	None	Darbhanga	Darbhanga	300,497
81	Alinagar	None	Darbhanga	Darbhanga	285,708
82	Darbhanga Rural	None	Darbhanga	Darbhanga	290,287
83	Darbhanga	None	Darbhanga	Darbhanga	325,503
84	Hayaghat	None	Darbhanga	Samastipur	253,557
85	Bahadurpur	None	Darbhanga	Darbhanga	310,848
86	Keoti	None	Darbhanga	Madhubani	298,961
87	Jale	None	Darbhanga	Madhubani	314,779
88	Gaighat	None	Muzaffarpur	Muzaffarpur	322,326
89	Aurai	None	Muzaffarpur	Muzaffarpur	311,664
90	Minapur	None	Muzaffarpur	Muzaffarpur	282,903
91	Bochahan	SC	Muzaffarpur	Muzaffarpur	286,053
92	Sakra	SC	Muzaffarpur	Muzaffarpur	273,397
93	Kurhani	None	Muzaffarpur	Muzaffarpur	306,238
94	Muzaffarpur	None	Muzaffarpur	Muzaffarpur	316,880
95	Kanti	None	Muzaffarpur	Vaishali	319,372
96	Baruraj	None	Muzaffarpur	Vaishali	278,389
97	Paroo	None	Muzaffarpur	Vaishali	313,093
98	Sahebganj	None	Muzaffarpur	Vaishali	301,544
99	Baikunthpur	None	Gopalganj	Gopalganj	308,361
100	Barauli	None	Gopalganj	Gopalganj	284,192
101	Gopalganj	None	Gopalganj	Gopalganj	297,051
102	Kuchaikote	None	Gopalganj	Gopalganj	300,132
103	Bhore	SC	Gopalganj	Gopalganj	337,564
104	Hathua	None	Gopalganj	Gopalganj	291,165
105	Siwan	None	Siwan	Siwan	319,165
106	Ziradei	None	Siwan	Siwan	276,435
107	Darauli	SC	Siwan	Siwan	308,041
108	Raghunathpur	None	Siwan	Siwan	294,703
109	Daraunda	None	Siwan	Siwan	315,729
110	Barharia	None	Siwan	Siwan	310,094
111	Goriakothi	None	Siwan	Maharajganj	331,190
112	Maharajganj	None	Siwan	Maharajganj	302,398
113	Ekma	None	Saran	Maharajganj	291,675
114	Manjhi	None	Saran	Maharajganj	294,611
115	Baniapur	None	Saran	Maharajganj	317,424
116	Taraiya	None	Saran	Maharajganj	298,532
117	Marhaura	None	Saran	Saran	271,541
118	Chapra	None	Saran	Saran	325,112
119	Garkha	SC	Saran	Saran	311,162
120	Amnour	None	Saran	Saran	250,779
121	Parsa	None	Saran	Saran	270,589
122	Sonpur	None	Saran	Saran	290,014
123	Hajipur	None	Vaishali	Hajipur	335,905
124	Lalganj	None	Vaishali	Hajipur	344,150
125	Vaishali	None	Vaishali	Vaishali	337,584
126	Mahua	None	Vaishali	Hajipur	295,843
127	Raja Pakar	SC	Vaishali	Hajipur	281,602
128	Raghopur	None	Vaishali	Hajipur	345,491
129	Mahnar	None	Vaishali	Hajipur	301,439
130	Patepur	SC	Vaishali	Ujiarpur	300,968
131	Kalyanpur	SC	Samastipur	Samastipur	324,932
132	Warisnagar	None	Samastipur	Samastipur	324,904
133	Samastipur	None	Samastipur	Samastipur	275,257
134	Ujiarpur	None	Samastipur	Ujiarpur	310,269
135	Morwa	None	Samastipur	Ujiarpur	269,034
136	Sarairanjan	None	Samastipur	Ujiarpur	283,203
137	Mohiuddinnagar	None	Samastipur	Ujiarpur	260,541
138	Bibhutipur	None	Samastipur	Ujiarpur	275,296
139	Rosera	SC	Samastipur	Samastipur	331,466
140	Hasanpur	None	Samastipur	Khagaria	289,760
141	Cheria-Bariarpur	None	Begusarai	Begusarai	272,019
142	Bachhwara	None	Begusarai	Begusarai	312,121
143	Teghra	None	Begusarai	Begusarai	302,549
144	Matihani	None	Begusarai	Begusarai	354,216
145	Sahebpur Kamal	None	Begusarai	Begusarai	263,289
146	Begusarai	None	Begusarai	Begusarai	342,217
147	Bakhri	SC	Begusarai	Begusarai	294,566
148	Alauli	SC	Khagaria	Khagaria	266,664
149	Khagaria	None	Khagaria	Khagaria	261,473
150	Beldaur	None	Khagaria	Khagaria	323,717
151	Parbatta	None	Khagaria	Khagaria	317,609
152	Bihpur	None	Bhagalpur	Bhagalpur	266,461
153	Gopalpur	None	Bhagalpur	Bhagalpur	276,973
154	Pirpainti	SC	Bhagalpur	Bhagalpur	345,572
155	Kahalgaon	None	Bhagalpur	Bhagalpur	344,690
156	Bhagalpur	None	Bhagalpur	Bhagalpur	344,577
157	Sultanganj	None	Bhagalpur	Banka	319,989
158	Nathnagar	None	Bhagalpur	Bhagalpur	337,948
159	Amarpur	None	Banka	Banka	298,837
160	Dhoraiya	SC	Banka	Banka	307,230
161	Banka	None	Banka	Banka	260,299
162	Katoria	ST	Banka	Banka	270,298
163	Belhar	None	Banka	Banka	319,717
164	Tarapur	None	Munger	Jamui	331,313
165	Munger	None	Munger	Munger	341,931
166	Jamalpur	None	Munger	Munger	330,571
167	Suryagarha	None	Lakhisarai	Munger	358,028
168	Lakhisarai	None	Lakhisarai	Munger	391,944
169	Sheikhpura	None	Sheikhpura	Jamui	263,432
170	Barbigha	None	Sheikhpura	Nawada	232,576
171	Asthawan	None	Nalanda	Nalanda	304,992
172	Biharsharif	None	Nalanda	Nalanda	389,706
173	Rajgir	SC	Nalanda	Nalanda	299,852
174	Islampur	None	Nalanda	Nalanda	303,226
175	Hilsa	None	Nalanda	Nalanda	304,842
176	Nalanda	None	Nalanda	Nalanda	325,999
177	Harnaut	None	Nalanda	Nalanda	319,850
178	Mokama	None	Patna	Munger	286,050
179	Barh	None	Patna	Munger	292,909
180	Bakhtiarpur	None	Patna	Patna Sahib	298,087
181	Digha	None	Patna	Patna Sahib	458,367
182	Bankipur	None	Patna	Patna Sahib	379,402
183	Kumhrar	None	Patna	Patna Sahib	431,390
184	Patna Sahib	None	Patna	Patna Sahib	389,881
185	Fatuha	None	Patna	Patna Sahib	286,297
186	Danapur	None	Patna	Pataliputra	376,759
187	Maner	None	Patna	Pataliputra	334,256
188	Phulwari	SC	Patna	Pataliputra	386,351
189	Masaurhi	SC	Patna	Pataliputra	326,914
190	Paliganj	None	Patna	Pataliputra	285,778
191	Bikram	None	Patna	Pataliputra	310,092
192	Sandesh	None	Bhojpur	Arrah	291,878
193	Barhara	None	Bhojpur	Arrah	312,103
194	Arrah	None	Bhojpur	Arrah	327,553
195	Agiaon	SC	Bhojpur	Arrah	263,836
196	Tarari	None	Bhojpur	Arrah	304,027
197	Jagdishpur	None	Bhojpur	Arrah	308,381
198	Shahpur	None	Bhojpur	Arrah	308,161
199	Brahampur	None	Buxar	Buxar	346,158
200	Buxar	None	Buxar	Buxar	288,128
201	Dumraon	None	Buxar	Buxar	324,739
202	Rajpur	SC	Buxar	Buxar	336,695
203	Ramgarh	None	Kaimur	Buxar	286,876
204	Mohania	SC	Kaimur	Sasaram	277,850
205	Bhabua	None	Kaimur	Sasaram	280,564
206	Chainpur	None	Kaimur	Sasaram	329,045
207	Chenari	SC	Rohtas	Sasaram	312,311
208	Sasaram	None	Rohtas	Sasaram	355,249
209	Kargahar	None	Rohtas	Sasaram	331,884
210	Dinara	None	Rohtas	Buxar	308,070
211	Nokha	None	Rohtas	Karakat	297,842
212	Dehri	None	Rohtas	Karakat	299,804
213	Karakat	None	Rohtas	Karakat	333,262
214	Arwal	None	Arwal	Jahanabad	268,421
215	Kurtha	None	Arwal	Jahanabad	259,061
216	Jehanabad	None	Jehanabad	Jahanabad	302,681
217	Ghosi	None	Jehanabad	Jahanabad	260,927
218	Makhdumpur	SC	Jehanabad	Jahanabad	249,011
219	Goh	None	Aurangabad	Karakat	313,574
220	Obra	None	Aurangabad	Karakat	319,915
221	Nabinagar	None	Aurangabad	Karakat	283,912
222	Kutumba	SC	Aurangabad	Aurangabad	272,650
223	Aurangabad	None	Aurangabad	Aurangabad	312,764
224	Rafiganj	None	Aurangabad	Aurangabad	333,900
225	Gurua	None	Gaya	Aurangabad	285,969
226	Sherghati	None	Gaya	Gaya	279,534
227	Imamganj	SC	Gaya	Aurangabad	304,475
228	Barachatti	SC	Gaya	Gaya	310,945
229	Bodh Gaya	SC	Gaya	Gaya	329,813
230	Gaya Town	None	Gaya	Gaya	280,313
231	Tikari	None	Gaya	Aurangabad	302,975
232	Belaganj	None	Gaya	Gaya	279,839
233	Atri	None	Gaya	Jahanabad	308,538
234	Wazirganj	None	Gaya	Gaya	315,561
235	Rajauli	SC	Nawada	Nawada	331,278
236	Hisua	None	Nawada	Nawada	368,488
237	Nawada	None	Nawada	Nawada	364,839
238	Gobindpur	None	Nawada	Nawada	315,221
239	Warsaliganj	None	Nawada	Nawada	345,554
240	Sikandra	SC	Jamui	Jamui	301,506
241	Jamui	None	Jamui	Jamui	313,053
242	Jhajha	None	Jamui	Jamui	339,867
243	Chakai	None	Jamui	Jamui	319,819

== See also ==
- List of Lok Sabha constituencies in Bihar
- List of constituencies of the Jharkhand Legislative Assembly
- Bihar Legislative Council
