= Ranvijay Sahu =

Indian politician (born 1979)

Ranvijay Sahu (born 1979) is an Indian politician from Bihar. He is an MLA from Morwa Assembly constituency in Samastipur district. He won the 2020 Bihar Legislative Assembly election representing Rashtriya Janata Dal.

== Early life and education ==
He is from Ujiyarpur, Samastipur district, Bihar. He is the son of Magan Lal Sah. He completed his graduation in Commerce in 1998 at a college affiliated with Magadh University. He runs his own business.

== Career ==
Sahu won from Morwa Assembly constituency representing RJD in the 2020 Bihar Legislative Assembly election. He polled 59,554 votes and defeated his nearest rival, Vidyasagar Singh Nishad of Janata Dal (United), by a margin of 10,671 votes.
