= Sarairanjan =

Town in Samastipur, Bihar

Coordinates: 25.7610°N 85.7182°E

Sarairanjan is a town in the Sarairanjan (Vidhan Sabha constituency) in Samastipur district in the Indian state of Bihar. It is located on the musrigharari - Vidyapati Nagar road. Public transport(tempos) are available to nearest town Dalsinghsarai, Mushrigharari and Vidyapati Nagar. It is located approximately 6 km south of Musrigharari. Sarairanjan market is the main market for all the nearby villages in the constituency. It has a government hospital, a police station Block and water department near to the market. Nearest railway station is samastipur jn. approx 13 km.
