= Chand Chaur =

Village in Bihar, India

- Village
- Location within Bihar Location within India
- Coordinates: 25°43′43″N 85°47′48″E
- Country: India
- State: Bihar
- District: Samastipur
- Block: Ujiarpur

Government
  - Type: Sarpanch

Area
  - Total: 14.82 km^{2} (5.72 sq mi)
- Elevation: 52 m (171 ft)

Population (2011)
  - Total: 33,457
  - Density: 2,258/km^{2} (5,847/sq mi)

Languages
  - Common: Maithili, Hindi
- Time zone: UTC+5:30 (IST)
- PIN: 848114
- STD code: 06274
- Vehicle registration: BR-33

Chand Chaur is a village in Bihar, India. It is located in the western portion of Samastipur District, approximately 14 kilometres south of the district seat Samastipur. As of 2011, the village had a population of 33,457.

== Geography ==
Chand Chaur is located between Burhi Gandak River and Ganges River, with the National Highway 122 traversing through the village. It covers an area of 1482 hectares.

== Demographics ==
According to the 2011 Census of India, Chand Chaur had a population of 33,457: 17,669 males and 15,788 females. The working population constituted 34.36% of the total population. The overall literacy rate was 56.85%, with 11,349 male inhabitants and 7,671 female inhabitants being literate.
