= Khalispur =

Khalispur may refer to:

- Khalispur, Raebareli, a village in Raebareli district, Uttar Pradesh, India
- Khalispur, Siwan, a village in Siwan District, Bihar, India
- Khalispur, Samastipur, a village in Samastipur District, Bihar, India
- Khalispur, Varanasi, a village in Varanasi District, Uttar Pradesh, India
