= Raipur, Bhagwanpur =

Raipur
- Village
- Location in Bihar, India Raipur (India)
- Coordinates: 25°54′55.9″N 85°51′35.7″E
- Country: India
- State: Bihar
- District: Samastipur
- Elevation: 14 m (46 ft)

Languages
  - Official: Maithili, Hindi
- Time zone: UTC+5:30 (IST)
- PIN: 848134
- Telephone code: 06274
- ISO 3166 code: IN-BR
- Nearest city: Muzaffarpur Darbhanga
- Avg. summer temperature: 40 °C (104 °F)
- Avg. winter temperature: 2 °C (36 °F)

Raipur and Bhagwanpur is a village in Samastipur district of Bihar.

== Surroundings ==
Kishanpur, Chatneswar, Nakta Chowk, Gohi, Warisnagar, and Candauli are nearby.

== Transportation ==
Moglani Road passes through Kishanpur Railway Station. The nearest airport is Patna Airport.
