= Ram Chandra Rai =

Indian politician

- Born: 1941; Kursaha, Samastipur, Bihar
- Died: 2023 (aged 81–82); Patna, Bihar
- Occupation: Politician
- Known for: Member of Constituent Assembly

Ram Chandra Rai (1941–2023) was an Indian politician from Bihar. He won four times from the Mohiuddinnagar assembly constituency in 1980, 1990, 1995 and 2000. He died in 2023 at the age of 82.

== Biography ==
Ramchandra Rai was born in a Yadav (Ahir) family in Kursaha village of Samastipur district of Bihar. His father Ramswaroop Rai was a farmer.

Rai was a famous advocate of Samastipur. In 1980, he contested the assembly elections from Mohiuddinnagar for the first time on a Congress ticket and won.

== See also ==
- Mohiuddinnagar assembly constituency
