= Khalispur, Samastipur =

Khalispur
- Village
- Location in Bihar, India Khalispur (India)
- Coordinates: 25°43′37″N 85°41′05″E
- Country: India
- State: Bihar
- District: Samastipur
- Subdistrict: Sarairanjan

Population (2011)
  - Total: 6,001
- Time zone: UTC+05:30 (IST)
- Pincode: 848505
- ISO 3166 code: IN-BR

Khalispur is a village in the Sarairanjan block, Samastipur district, of the Indian state of Bihar.

== Geography ==
Khalispur is situated 16 km from district headquarters Samastipur on the bank of River Jamuari.

== Demographics ==
The population was 6,001 at the 2011 Indian census. The literacy percent of the village is over 52%.

== Economy ==
This village is known for tobacco farming.

== Education ==
The village hosts one middle school, and Dasrath-Janak High School and Ram-Janki High School. Many private schools, like Public Central School, are there.

== Health care ==
Medical facilities are available for primary and emergency care. The city supports medicine shops and pharmacies.

== Transport ==
Transportation facilities connect the village to Samastipur and Patna.

== Market ==
A market is located at Gandhi Chowk. Haat baazar operates there.

== Culture ==
Traditional Maithili culture is dominant. Hindi and Maithili are the main languages. Chhath Puja and Durga Puja are the main festivals. Other Hindu and Muslim festivals include Diwali, Raksha Bandhan, Holi Ram, Navmi, Eid bakre, Eid-al-Fitr, and Moharram.
