= Bazidpur, Samastipur =

Bazidpur is a village in Samastipur district in the Bihar State of India.
