= Ujiarpur Lok Sabha constituency =

Constituency of the Indian parliament in Bihar

Coordinates: 25.8°N 85.8°E

Ujiarpur
- Lok Sabha constituency

Constituency details
- Country: India
- Region: East India
- State: Bihar
- Assembly constituencies: Patepur; Ujiarpur; Morwa; Sarairanjan; Mohiuddinagar; Bibhutipur
- Established: 2009
- Reservation: None

Member of Parliament
- 18th Lok Sabha
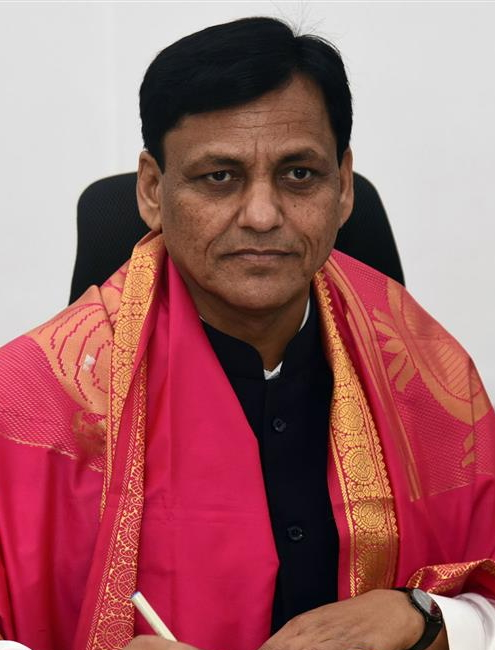
- Incumbent Nityanand Rai
- Party: BJP
- Alliance: NDA
- Preceded by: Ashwamedh Devi; JD(U)

Ujiarpur is one of the 40 Lok Sabha (parliamentary) constituencies in Bihar state in eastern India. This constituency came into existence in 2008, following delimitation of the parliamentary constituencies based on the recommendations of the Delimitation Commission of India.

== Assembly segments ==
From the 2009 Lok Sabha elections, Ujiarpur Lok Sabha constituency comprises six Vidhan Sabha (legislative assembly) segments, which are:

#	Name	District	Member	Party	2024 lead
130	Patepur (SC)	Vaishali	Lakhendra Raushan	BJP	BJP
134	Ujiarpur	Samastipur	Alok Mehta	RJD	BJP
135	Morwa	Samastipur	Ranvijay Sahu	RJD	BJP
136	Sarairanjan	Samastipur	Vijay Chaudhary	JD(U)	BJP
137	Mohiuddinagar	Samastipur	Rajesh Kumar Singh	BJP	BJP
138	Bibhutipur	Samastipur	Ajay Kumar Kushwaha	CPI(M)	RJD

== Members of Parliament ==
Year	Name	Party
Until 2008 : Constituency did not exist
2009	Ashwamedh Devi	Janata Dal (United)
2014	Nityanand Rai	Bharatiya Janata Party
2019	Nityanand Rai	Bharatiya Janata Party
2024	Nityanand Rai	Bharatiya Janata Party

== Election results ==
=== 2024 ===
2024 Indian general election: Ujiarpur
Party	Candidate	Votes	%	±%
BJP	Nityanand Rai	515,965	49.51	
RJD	Alok Kumar Mehta	4,55,863	43.75	
NOTA	None of the Above	23,269	2.23	
Majority		60,102	5.76	
Turnout		10,42,749	59.64	
BJP hold		Swing		

=== 2019 ===
2019 Indian general elections: Ujiarpur
Party	Candidate	Votes	%	±%
BJP	Nityanand Rai	543,906	56.11	
RLSP	Upendra Kushwaha	2,66,628	27.51	
CPI(M)	Ajay Kumar	27,577	2.85	
Independent	Mamta Kumari	23,590	2.43	
NOTA	None of the Above	14,434	1.49	
Majority		2,77,278	28.60	
Turnout		9,69,862	60.15	
BJP hold		Swing		

=== 2014 ===
2014 Indian general elections: Ujiarpur
Party	Candidate	Votes	%	±%
BJP	Nityanand Rai	317,352	36.95	
RJD	Alok Kumar Mehta	2,56,883	29.91	
JD(U)	Ashwamedh Devi	1,19,669	13.93	
CPI(M)	Ramdeo Verma	53,044	6.18	
BSP	Dharmendra Sahani	15,198	1.77	
NOTA	None of the Above	6,171	0.72	
Majority		60,469	7.04	
Turnout		8,58,925	60.22	
BJP gain from JD(U)		Swing		

=== 2009 ===
2009 Indian general elections: Ujiarpur
Party	Candidate	Votes	%	±%
JD(U)	Ashwamedh Devi	180,082	31.92	
RJD	Alok Kumar Mehta	1,54,770	27.43	
CPI(M)	Ram Deo Verma	58,900	10.44	
INC	Sheel Kumar Roy	43,038	7.63	
SS	Jitendra Kumar Roy	42,279	7.49	
Majority		25,312	4.49	
Turnout		5,64,199	45.89	
JD(U) win (new seat)				
