= Ramdeo Verma =

Indian politician (born 1947)

- रामदेव वर्मा

Member of Bihar Legislative Assembly
- Constituency: Bibhutipur
- In office 1980 - 1985
- Preceded by: Bandhu Mahato
- Succeeded by: Chandrabali Thakur
- In office 1990 - 2010
- Preceded by: Chandrabali Thakur
- Succeeded by: Ram Balak Singh

Personal details
- Born: 1947
- Died: 23 May, 2022
- Political party: Communist Party of India (Marxist-Leninist) Liberation (from 2020); CPIM (1967-2020)
- Spouse: Manju Prakash

Ramdeo Verma, also known as Ramdeo Mahto, was an Indian politician, belonging to the Communist Party of India (Marxist). Verma served as a member of the Bihar Legislative Assembly from Bibhutipur from 1980 to 1985 and 1990 to 2010. His wife Manju Prakash also served as a member of the Bihar Legislative Assembly from Buxar (Vidhan Sabha constituency) from 1990 to 2000. He was a leader of the communist movement in the region of Bibhutipur, popularly known as 'Moscow' of Samastipur. After 2020 November, he joined Communist Party of India (Marxist-Leninist) Liberation.

== Electoral Result ==
Ramdeo Verma took part in Bihar Vidhan Sabha Election from Bibhutipur each time between 1980 and 2015. He served as MLA from 1980 to 1985 and 1990 to 2010.

Electoral History
Year	Winner	Party	Votes	%	Runner-up	Party	Votes	%	Margin	%
2015	Ram Balak Singh	JD(U)	57,882	39.76	Ramdeo Verma	CPI(M)	40,647	27.92	17,235	12.21
2010	Ram Balak Singh	JD(U)	46,469	38.30	Ramdeo Verma	CPI(M)	34,168	28.16	12,301	10.14
2005 Oct	Ramdeo Verma	CPI(M)	54,616	43.66	Ram Balak Singh	LJP	41,865	33.47	12,751	10.19
2005 Feb	Ramdeo Verma	CPI(M)	50,464	41.46	Ram Balak Singh	LJP	49,622	40.77	842	0.69
2000	Ramdeo Verma	CPI(M)	55,174	41.60	Chandrabali Thakur	INC	38,707	29.18	16,467	12.41
1995	Ramdeo Verma	CPI(M)	65,303	48.86	Chandrabali Thakur	INC	47,696	35.69	17,607	13.17
1990	Ramdeo Verma	CPI(M)	60,715	46.89	Chandrabali Thakur	Independent	55,643	42.97	5,072	3.92
1985	Chandrabali Thakur	INC	53,931	48.96	Ramdeo Verma	CPI(M)	52,344	47.52	1587	1.44
1980	Ramdeo Verma	CPI(M)	26,308	33.76	Bandhu Mahto	INC(I)	20,612	26.45	5,696	7.31

He had also unsuccessfully contested in 2009 and 2014 Indian general election from Ujiarpur.

== Personal life ==
He belonged to Kushwaha community and was known for championing the cause of the weaker sections'. His membership with CPIM ended in November 2020. Verma was a resident of Patailiya village. His wife Manju Prakash was a former president of Bihar State Women Commission. In his last days, he was reported to be suffering with cancer. Despite being a cancer patient, there used to be daily meetings on his residence, in which people from his constituency used to come, in order to lodge their grievances to him. While he was suffering from cancer, he continued his readings and consequently wrote a book called Inquilab Jindabad.
