= Mahmada =

Coordinates: 26°31′N 84°53′E

Mahmada is a village in Samastipur district in Bihar state and Kotwa tehsil, India.

Mahmada is known for its farming, cultivation of mustard oil and sugar cane. It is also known for growing fruits like lychee and mangoes.
