= Rohua Warisnagar =

Coordinates: 25.956037°N 85.880946°E

Rohua is a village in Warisnagar Block, in the Samastipur district in Bihar, India. Its population in 2011 was 17,597.

It is divided into two panchayats: Rohua east and Rohua west. Agriculture is the main occupation of the villagers.

The mukhiya of Rohua east panchyat's is Arman Kumar and mukhiya of Rohua east panchyat's is Basasith Rawat.

Village is mostly depend on agriculture. Vegetable and Tobacco is main crop is there.
