= Morwa Assembly constituency =

Coordinates: 25°47′12″N 85°40′13″E

Morwa
- Constituency No. 135 for the Bihar Legislative Assembly

Constituency details
- Country: India
- Region: East India
- State: Bihar
- District: Samastipur
- Lok Sabha constituency: Ujiarpur
- Established: 2008
- Total electors: 269,034

Member of Legislative Assembly
- 18th Bihar Legislative Assembly
- Incumbent Ranvijay Sahu
- Party: RJD
- Alliance: MGB
- Elected year: 2025
- Preceded by: Vidya Sagar Nishad, JD(U)

Morwa Assembly constituency is an assembly constituency in Samastipur district in the Indian state of Bihar.

== Overview ==
As per Delimitation of Parliamentary and Assembly constituencies Order, 2008, No. 135 Morwa Assembly constituency is composed of the following: Morwa community development block; Muradpur Bangra, Gauspur Sarsauna, Kothiya, Manpura, Harishankarpur Baghauni, Madhopur, Dhgharua, Kaswe Aahar, Ramapur Maheshpur, Rahimabad, Rajwa and Fatehpur gram panchayats of Tajpur CD Block; Sirdilpur Supaul, Hasanpur Surat, Jorpura, Shahpur Undi, Chaksalem, Darba, Imansarai and Bahadurpur Patori of Patori CD Block.

Morwa Assembly constituency is part of No. 22 Ujiarpur (Lok Sabha constituency).

== Members of the Legislative Assembly ==
Year	Member	Party
1952-2008: Constituency did not exist
2010	Baidhnath Sahani	Janata Dal (United)
2015	Vidya Sagar Nishad	Janata Dal (United)
2020	Ranvijay Sahu	Rashtriya Janata Dal
2025	Ranvijay Sahu	Rashtriya Janata Dal

== Election results ==
=== 2025 ===
Bihar Legislative Assembly Election, 2025: Morwa
Party	Candidate	Votes	%	±%
RJD	Ranvijay Sahu	77,770	39.53	+2.47
JD(U)	Vidya Sagar Nishad	69,099	35.13	+4.71
Independent	Abhay Kumar Singh	30,046	15.27	
JSP	Dr Jagriti Thakur	4,131	2.1	
Apna Kisan Party	Ranjeet Kumar	3,259	1.66	
AAP	Tuntun Ray	3,145	1.6	
SUCI(C)	Chandrasekhar Rai	2,728	1.39	
NOTA	None of the above	3,571	1.82	+0.73
Majority		8,671	4.4	−2.24
Turnout		196,721	73.12	+13.7
RJD hold		Swing		

=== 2020 ===
2020 Bihar Legislative Assembly election: Morwa
Party	Candidate	Votes	%	±%
RJD	Ranvijay Sahu	59,554	37.06	
JD(U)	Vidya Sagar Singh Nishad	48,883	30.42	−12.32
LJP	Abhay Kumar Singh	23,884	14.86	
Independent	Jay Krishn Ray	6,379	3.97	
Rashtriya Janshakti Party (Secular)	Rashmani Kumar Ray	2,967	1.85	
RLSP	Kumar Anant	2,482	1.54	
Log Jan Party Secular	Rameshwar Ray	2,438	1.52	
The Plurals Party	Umashankar Thakur	1,955	1.22	
JAP(L)	Suryanarayan Sahni	1,793	1.12	
Independent	Pranav Kumar	1,581	0.98	
NOTA	None of the above	1,747	1.09	−1.26
Majority		10,671	6.64	−6.94
Turnout		160,716	59.42	+1.45
RJD gain from JD(U)		Swing		

=== 2015 ===
In the 2015 state assembly elections, VidyaSargar Singh Nishad of JD(U) won.

2015 Bihar Legislative Assembly election: Morwa
Party	Candidate	Votes	%	±%
JD(U)	Vidya Sagar Singh Nishad	59,206	42.74	
BJP	Suresh Ray	40,390	29.16	
SS	Anil Kumar Sharma	9,380	6.77	
Independent	Abhay Kumar Singh	5,946	4.29	
CPI	Ramprit Paswan	3,328	2.4	
BSP	Dinesh Kumar Sharma	2,534	1.83	
Independent	Pranav Kumar Mishra	2,365	1.71	
Independent	Sweta Kumari	1,728	1.25	
Independent	Munna Sahni	1,700	1.23	
Independent	Khalid Tanweer	1,546	1.12	
Independent	Sudhir Kumar	1,431	1.03	
NDP	Nilotpal Mrinal	1,360	0.98	
NOTA	None of the above	3,261	2.35	
Majority		18,816	13.58	
Turnout		138,520	57.97	

=== 2010 ===
In the 2010 state assembly elections, Baidhnath Sahani of JD(U) won the newly constituted Morwa seat defeating his nearest rival Ashok Singh of RJD.
