= Mohiuddinnagar Assembly constituency =

Coordinates: 25°36′06″N 85°42′30″E

Mohiuddinnagar
- Constituency No. 137 for the Bihar Legislative Assembly

Constituency details
- Country: India
- Region: East India
- State: Bihar
- District: Samastipur
- Established: 1951
- Total electors: 260,541

Member of Legislative Assembly
- 18th Bihar Legislative Assembly
- Incumbent Rajesh Kumar Singh
- Party: BJP
- Alliance: NDA
- Elected year: 2025

Mohiuddinnagar Assembly constituency is an assembly constituency in Samastipur district in the Indian state of Bihar.

== Overview ==
As per Delimitation of Parliamentary and Assembly constituencies Order, 2008, No. 137 Mohiuddinnagar Assembly constituency is composed of the following: Mohiuddinnagar and Mohanpur community development blocks; Tara Dhamaun, Uttri Dhamaun, Dakshini Dhamaun, Inayatpur, Hettanpur, Rupauli, Chaksaho, Harpur Saidabad and Seora gram panchayats of Patori CD Block.

Mohiuddinnagar Assembly constituency is part of No. 22 Ujiarpur (Lok Sabha constituency).

== Members of the Legislative Assembly ==
Year	Name	Party
1952	Ramrup Prasad Rai	Indian National Congress
1957	Shanti Devi	Indian National Congress
1962	Shanti Devi	Indian National Congress
1967	Premlata Rai	Samyukta Socialist Party
1969	Kapildeo Narain Singh	Independent politician
1972	Kapildeo Narain Singh	Indian National Congress
1977	Premlata Rai	Janata Party
1980	Ram Chandra Rai	Indian National Congress
1985	Anugrah Narain Singh	Indian National Congress
1990	Ram Chandra Rai	Janata Dal
1995	Ram Chandra Rai	Janata Dal
2000	Ram Chandra Rai	Rashtriya Janata Dal
2005	Ajay Kumar Bulganin	Lok Janshakti Party
2005	Ajay Kumar Bulganin	Rashtriya Janata Dal
2010	Rana Gangeshwar Singh	Bharatiya Janata Party
2014^	Ajay Kumar Bulganin	Rashtriya Janata Dal
2015	Ejya Yadav	Rashtriya Janata Dal
2020	Rajesh Kumar Singh	Bharatiya Janata Party

== Election results ==
=== 2025 ===
Bihar Legislative Assembly Election, 2025: Mohiuddinnagar
Party	Candidate	Votes	%	±%
BJP	Rajesh Singh	89,208	48.68	+1.17
RJD	Ejya Yadav	77,526	42.31	+5.0
JSP	Rajkapoor Singh	4,414	2.41	
Independent	Vishwanath Sah	2,230	1.22	
Independent	Sunil Kumar Ray	2,025	1.11	
NOTA	None of the above	2,197	1.2	+0.83
Majority		11,682	6.37	−3.83
Turnout		183,240	70.33	+14.31
BJP hold		Swing	NDA	

=== 2020 ===
2020 Bihar Legislative Assembly election: Mohiuddinnagar
Party	Candidate	Votes	%	±%
BJP	Rajesh Kumar Singh	70,385	47.51	▲32.66
RJD	Ejya Yadav	55,271	37.31	▼0.52
JAP(L)	Ajay Kumar Bulganin	5,752	3.88	▼2.61
Independent	Arun Kumar Singh	3,255	2.2	
Independent	Nagendra Singh	2,938	1.98	
Independent	Dinakar Prasad Yadav	2,567	1.73	
Independent	Mahendra Ray	1,652	1.12	
NOTA	None of the above	546	0.37	▼1.07
Majority		15,114	10.2	▼8.6
Turnout		148,155	56.02	▲3.47
BJP gain from RJD		Swing		

=== 2015 ===
2015 Bihar Legislative Assembly election: Mohiuddinnagar
Party	Candidate	Votes	%	±%
RJD	Ejya Yadav	47,137	37.83	
Independent	Rajesh Kumar Singh	23,706	19.03	
BJP	Satyendra Narayan Singh	18,496	14.85	
CPI(M)	Manoj Prasad Sunil	10,018	8.04	
JAP(L)	Ajay Kumar Bulganin	8,081	6.49	
Independent	Jawahar Lal Ray	3,297	2.65	
Independent	Jayshiv Rana Manish Alias Rana Rajeev Singh	2,145	1.72	
Independent	Ram Vivek Paswan	2,104	1.69	
Independent	Anita Kumari	1,231	0.99	
Independent	Randhir Bhai	1,139	0.91	
NOTA	None of the above	1,795	1.44	
Majority		23,431	18.8	
Turnout		124,591	52.55	
