= Lakhendra Kumar Raushan =

Indian politician

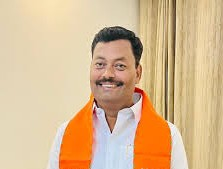

Minister of SC & ST Welfare Government of Bihar
- Incumbent
- Assumed office 07 May 2026
- Chief Minister: Samrat Choudhary
- Preceded by: Samrat Choudhary
- In office 20 November 2025 – 15 April 2026
- Preceded by: Janak Ram
- Succeeded by: Samrat Choudhary

Member of Bihar Legislative Assembly
- Incumbent
- Assumed office 10 November 2020
- Preceded by: Prema Chaudhary
- Constituency: Patepur

Personal details
- Born: 2 January 1980 (age 46)
- Party: Bharatiya Janta Party
- Occupation: Politician

Lakhendra Kumar Raushan also known as Lakhendra Paswanis an Indian politician from Bihar and current minister of Scheduled Castes and Scheduled Tribes Welfare in the Government of Bihar. He is also a Member of the Bihar Legislative Assembly. Raushan won the Patepur Assembly constituency on the BJP ticket in the 2020 and 2025 Bihar Legislative Assembly election.
