= Patepur Assembly constituency =

Coordinates: 25°47′49″N 85°12′24″E

Patepur
- Constituency No. - for the Bihar Legislative Assembly

Constituency details
- Country: India
- Region: East India
- State: Bihar
- District: Vaishali
- Established: 1951
- Total electors: 300,968

Member of Legislative Assembly
- 18th Bihar Legislative Assembly
- Incumbent Lakhendra Kumar Raushan
- Party: BJP
- Alliance: NDA
- Elected year: 2025

Patepur Assembly constituency is an assembly constituency in Vaishali district in the Indian state of Bihar.It is reserved for scheduled castes.

== Overview ==
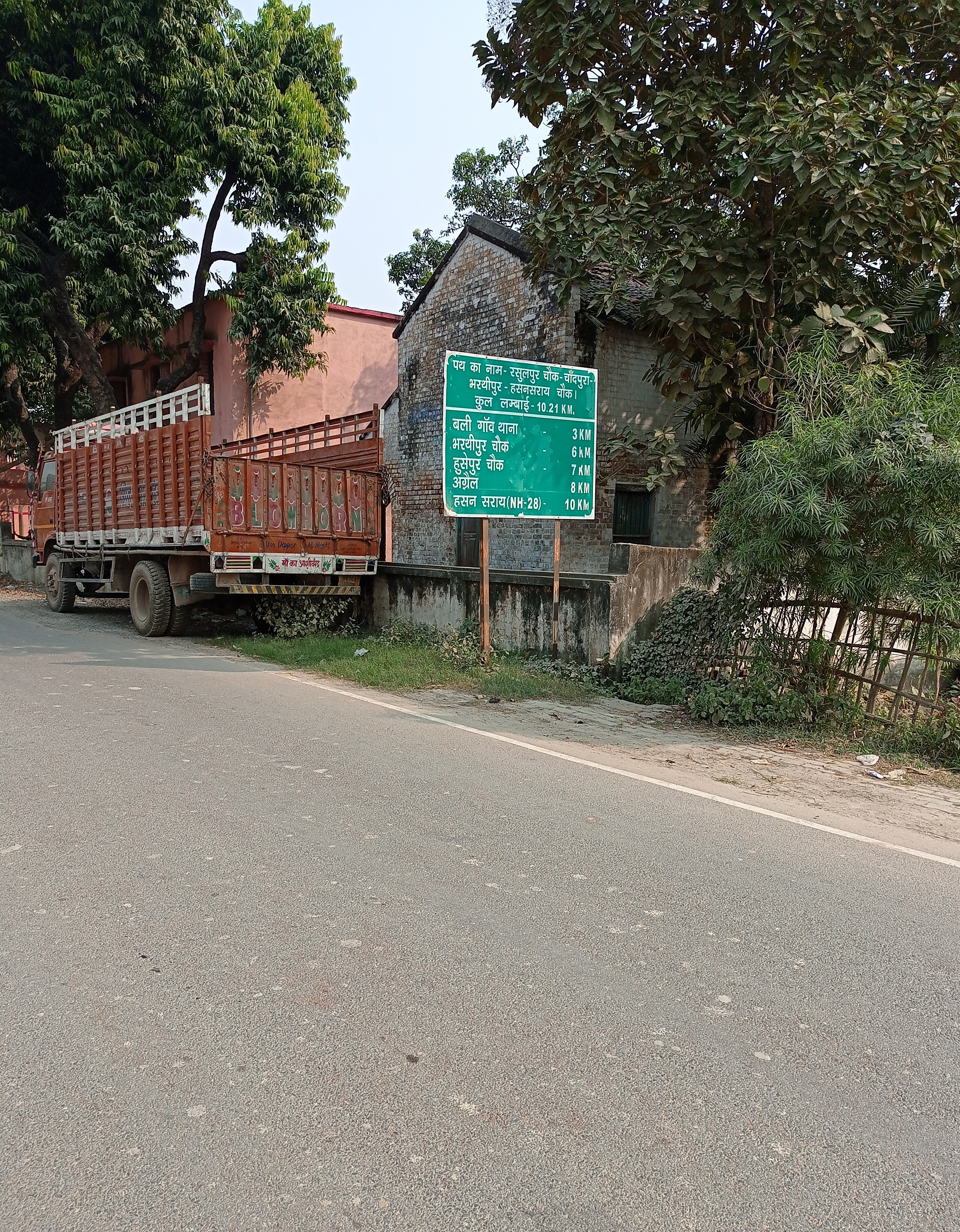
Patepur village main route

As per Delimitation of Parliamentary and Assembly constituencies Order, 2008, No. 130 Patepur Assembly constituency is composed of the following: Patepur community development block; Mansinghpur Bijhrauli, Kumar Bajitpur, Raghopur Narsanda, Adalpur, Naree Khurd and Laxmipur Barbatta gram panchayats of Jandaha community development block.

Patepur Assembly constituency (SC) is part of No. 22 Ujiarpur (Lok Sabha constituency).

== Members of the Legislative Assembly ==
Year	Member	Party
1952	Nathuni Lal Mahato	Socialist Party
1952^	B. Dubey	Indian National Congress
1957	Manzur Ahsan Ajazi	Indian National Congress
1962	Kamlesh Rai	Praja Socialist Party
1967	Paltan Ram	Samyukta Socialist Party
1969	Paltan Ram	Samyukta Socialist Party
1972	Righan Ram	Communist Party of India
1977	Paltan Ram	Janata Party
1980	Shiv Nandan Pawan	Janata Party
1985	Baleshwar Paswan	Indian National Congress
1990	Ram Sundar Das	Janata Dal
1991^	L. Mahto	Janata Dal
1995	Mahendra Baitha	Janata Dal
2000	Prema Chaudhary	Rashtriya Janata Dal
2005	Mahendra Baitha	Lok Janshakti Party
2005	Prema Chaudhary	Rashtriya Janata Dal
2010	Mahendra Baitha	Bharatiya Janata Party
2015	Prema Chaudhary	Rashtriya Janata Dal
2020	Lakhendra Raushan	Bharatiya Janata Party
2025	Lakhendra Raushan	Bharatiya Janata Party

== Election results ==
=== 2025 ===
2025 Bihar Legislative Assembly election: Patepur
Party	Candidate	Votes	%	±%
BJP	Lakhendra Kumar Raushan	108,356	51.71	−0.44
RJD	Prema Chaudhary	85,976	41.03	+4.46
JSP	Dasai Chaudhary	4,181	2.0	
Independent	Sanjay Paswan	3,423	1.63	
NOTA	None of the above	2,598	1.24	−0.29
Majority		22,380	10.68	−4.9
Turnout		209,540	69.62	+12.55
BJP gain from RJD		Swing		

=== 2020 ===
In 2015; Prema Chaudhary of Rashtriya Janata Dal defeated Mahendra Baitha of Bhartiya Janata Party by 12,461 votes. In 2020 assembly elections the contest to Patepur assembly seats was bilateral. In a tough fight, Lakhendra Kumar Raushan (aka Lakhendra Paswan) of Bhartiya Janata Party defeated Shivchandra Ram of Rashtriya Janata Dal.

2020 Bihar Legislative Assembly election: Patepur
Party	Candidate	Votes	%	±%
BJP	Lakhendra Kumar Raushan	86,509	52.15	+14.58
RJD	Shiv Chandra Ram	60,670	36.57	−9.5
Independent	Surendra Kumar Paswan	3,237	1.95	
Independent	Sanjay Ram	2,858	1.72	
Independent	Sanjay Rajak	2,337	1.41	
BSP	Devlal Ram	1,908	1.15	−0.22
NCP	Shashi Kumar	1,761	1.06	
NOTA	None of the above	2,533	1.53	+0.81
Majority		25,839	15.58	+7.08
Turnout		165,880	57.07	+0.84
BJP gain from RJD		Swing		

=== 2015 ===
2015 Bihar Legislative Assembly election: Patepur
Party	Candidate	Votes	%	±%
RJD	Prema Chaudhary	67,548	46.07	
BJP	Mahendra Baitha	55,087	37.57	
Independent	Ratan Lal	4,379	2.99	
Independent	Prem Shankar Paswan	2,768	1.89	
Independent	Ram Jeenish Paswan	2,374	1.62	
BSP	Ram Kripal Paswan	2,011	1.37	
Aap Aur Hum Party	Shashank Kumar Anand	1,486	1.01	
NOTA	None of the above	1,056	0.72	
Majority		12,461	8.5	
Turnout		146,608	56.23	

=== 2010 ===
In the 2010 state assembly elections, Mahendra Baitha of BJP won the Patepur assembly seat defeating his nearest rival Prema Chaudhary of RJD. Contests in most years were multi cornered but only winners and runners up are being mentioned. Prema Chaudhary of RJD defeated Mahendra Baitha of LJP in October 2005. Mahendra Baitha of LJP defeated Prema Chaudhary of RJD in February 2005. Prema Chaudhary of RJD defeated Mahendra Baitha of JD(U) in 2000. Mahendra Baitha of JD defeated Prema Chaudhary of SAP in 1995. Ram Sundar Das of JD defeated Baleshwar Singh Paswan of Congress in 1990. Baleshwar Singh Paswan of Congress defeated Paltan Ram of LD in 1985. Shiv Nandan Paswan of Janata Party (Secular – Charan Singh) defeated Baleshwar Singh Paswan of Congress in 1980. Paltan Ram of JP defeated Rijahan Ram of CPI in 1977.
