= National Highway 122 (India) =

National highway in India

National Highway 122
- Map of National Highway 122 in red

Route information
- Auxiliary route of NH 22
- Part of AH42
- Length: 110 km (68 mi)

Major junctions
- North end: Muzaffarpur
- NH 322 Musrigharari
- South end: Barauni

Location
- Country: India
- States: Bihar
- Primary destinations: Dholi, Tajpur Musrigharari

Highway system
- Roads in India; Expressways; National; State; Asian
← NH 22	→ NH 31

National Highway 122 is a national highway of India. This highway runs entirely in the state of Bihar. It is a spur road of National Highway 22. NH-122 was previously numbered NH-28.

== Route ==
NH-122 passes from following cities and town from north to south direction:

- Ram Dayalu Nagar (Muzaffarpur)
- Sakra Block
- Dholi railway station
- Tajpur Nagar Parishad
- Musrigharari (Samastipur)
- Ujiarpur Block
- Dalsinghsarai
- Bachwara
- Teghra Block
- Barauni (Begusarai)

== Junctions ==
NH 22 Terminal near Muzaffarpur.
SH 49 near Tajpur Nagar Parishad
NH 322 near Musrigharari
NH 31 Terminal near Barauni.

== See also ==
- List of national highways in India
- List of national highways in India by state
