= Chaksikandar =

Village in Vaishali district, Bihar, India

Chaksikandar is a village in Vaishali district of Bihar, India. It is 13 km east of the district headquarters town Hajipur on NH 322.
