= Ejya Yadav =

Indian politician

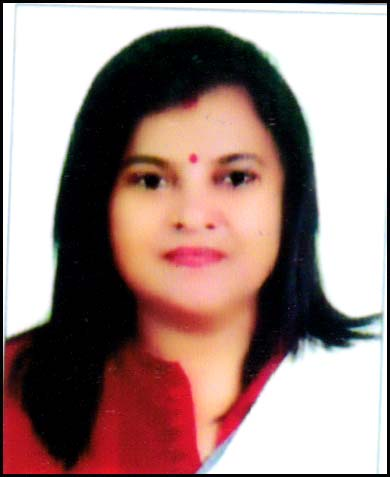

Member of the Bihar Legislative Assembly
- In office 2015–2020
- Preceded by: Ajay Kumar Bulganin
- Succeeded by: Rajesh Kumar Singh
- Constituency: Mohiuddinnagar

Personal details
- Born: 15 July 1971 (age 55) Jalalpur Mohiuddinagar, Bihar
- Party: Rashtriya Janata Dal

Ejya Yadav (born 15 July 1971) is an Indian politician, academic and former Member of the Legislative Assembly Bihar representing Mohiuddinnagar Vidhan Sabha constituency from the Rashtriya Janata Dal. Earlier, she had been a professor at Patna Women's College.

== Career ==
Yadav did her schooling at Ranchi Loreto Convent and Patna Notre Dame. Before getting elected as an MLA, she was the Head of the Communicative English Department at Patna Women's College.

During the 2015 Bihar Legislative Assembly election, Ejya was selected as the Rashtriya Janata Dal candidate for the Mohiuddinnagar seat ahead of the sitting MLA, Ajay Kumar Bulganin, who had represented the area twice before. Bulganin ran as the candidate of the Jan Adhikar Party. She won the race, defeating her nearest rival, independent candidate Rajesh Singh by over 23,000 votes.

Ejya Yadav has gained prominence within the RJD since her election. She was made the party spokesperson. She is seen as someone that can articulate the party's view to both journalists as well as the grassroots, especially since the arrest of party leader Lalu Prasad Yadav. She is one of the few party leaders who has visited Lalu in Ranchi jail to discuss party matters.

She was the RJD candidate for 2020 Bihar Legislative Assembly election from Mohiuddinnagar but lost to Rajesh Kumar Singh.
