= National Highway 322 (India) =

National highway in India

National Highway 322
- Map of National Highway 322 in red

Route information
- Length: 58 km (36 mi)

Major junctions
- From: Hajipur
- To: Musrigharari

Location
- Country: India

Highway system
- Roads in India; Expressways; National; State; Asian
← NH 22	→ NH 122

National Highway 322 (NH 322) is a National Highway in India. This highway runs entirely in the state of Bihar. This highway provide connection between NH-22 at Hajipur in Vaishali district and NH-122 at Musrigharari in Samastipur district.

== Route ==
NH-322 passes through following towns from west to east direction:

- Hajipur industrial area
- Bidupur R.S
- Chaksikandar
- Gazipur Chowk (Desari)
- Hazrat Jandaha
- Chaklal Sahi
- Sarairanjan
- Musrigharari (Samastipur)
