= Bibhutipur Assembly constituency =

Bibhutipur
- Constituency No. - for the Bihar Legislative Assembly

Constituency details
- Country: India
- Region: East India
- State: Bihar
- District: Samastipur
- Established: 1967
- Total electors: 275,296

Member of Legislative Assembly
- 18th Bihar Legislative Assembly
- Incumbent Ajay Kumar Kushwaha
- Party: CPI(M)
- Alliance: MGB
- Elected year: 2025

25°41′38″N 85°57′42″E

Bibhutipur Assembly constituency is an assembly constituency in Samastipur district in the Indian state of Bihar.

== Members of the Legislative Assembly ==
Year	Name	Party
1967	P. S. Madan	Communist Party of India
1969	Ganga Prasad Srivastava	Samyukta Socialist Party
1972	Bandhu Mahto	Indian National Congress
1977	Bandhu Mahto	Indian National Congress
1980	Ramdeo Verma	Communist Party of India (Marxist)
1985	Chandrabali Thakur	Indian National Congress
1990	Ramdeo Verma	Communist Party of India (Marxist)
1995	Ramdeo Verma	Communist Party of India (Marxist)
2000	Ramdeo Verma	Communist Party of India (Marxist)
2005	Ramdeo Verma	Communist Party of India (Marxist)
2005	Ramdeo Verma	Communist Party of India (Marxist)
2010	Ram Balak Kushwaha	Janata Dal (United)
2015	Ram Balak Kushwaha	Janata Dal (United)
2020	Ajay Kumar	Communist Party of India (Marxist)
2025	Ajay Kumar	Communist Party of India (Marxist)

== Overview ==
As per Delimitation of Parliamentary and Assembly constituencies Order, 2008, No. 138 Bibhutipur Assembly constituency is composed of the following: Bibhutipur community development block; Bulakipur, Kamrawn, Malpur Purwaripatti, Rampur Jalalpur, Narhan estate, Bambaiya Harlal and Ajnaul gram panchayats of Dalsinghsarai CD Block.

Bibhutipur Assembly constituency is part of No. 22 Ujiarpur (Lok Sabha constituency). The assembly constituency consists of 2.23 lakh voters and is dominated by the Kushwahas. It has been observed in the successive elections, by studying the voting pattern, that Kushwaha voters voting en masse decides the victory of a candidate.

== Results ==
=== 2025 ===
2025 Bihar Legislative Assembly election: Bibhutipur
Party	Candidate	Votes	%	±%
CPI(M)	Ajay Kumar	79,246	40.37	▼4.63
JD(U)	Ravina Kushwaha	68,965	35.13	▲14.82
Independent	Rupanjali Kumari	14,456	7.36	
JSP	Bishwanath Choudhary (Tufan ji)	13,450	6.85	
AAP	Arvind Kumar	2,574	1.31	
Independent	Ram Lal Tanti	2,313	1.18	
Independent	Shashi Bhushan Das	1,866	0.95	
Independent	Sushant Kumar	1,782	0.91	
NOTA	None of the above	4,807	2.45	▼0.8
Majority		10,281	5.24	▼19.45
Turnout		196,318	71.31	▲10.42
CPI(M) hold		Swing		

=== 2020 ===
2020 Bihar Legislative Assembly election: Bibhutipur
Party	Candidate	Votes	%	±%
CPI(M)	Ajay Kumar	73,822	45.0	+17.08
JD(U)	Ram Balak Singh	33,326	20.31	−19.45
LJP	Chandra Bali Thakur	28,811	17.56	−4.6
Independent	Manju Prakash	6,207	3.78	
Independent	Bishwanath Choudhary	6,111	3.73	
Independent	Navin Kumar	1,966	1.2	
BSP	Mamta Kumari	1,893	1.15	+0.34
NOTA	None of the above	5,333	3.25	+0.2
Majority		40,496	24.69	+12.85
Turnout		164,051	60.89	+0.53
CPI(M) gain from JD(U)		Swing		

=== 2015 ===
2015 Bihar Legislative Assembly election: Bibhutipur
Party	Candidate	Votes	%	±%
JD(U)	Ram Balak Singh	57,882	39.76	
CPI(M)	Ram Deo Verma	40,647	27.92	
LJP	Ramesh Kumar Roy	32,261	22.16	
RJP	Sanjeev Kumar	3,559	2.44	
Independent	Amarjeet Thakur	2,447	1.68	
Bharat Deshbhakt Party	Prithvi Nath Prasad	1,857	1.28	
Independent	Amresh Jha Alias Viddu Jha	1,304	0.9	
NOTA	None of the above	4,440	3.05	
Majority		17,235	11.84	
Turnout		145,578	60.36	
