= Bibhutipur, Samastipur =

Village in Bihar, India

Bibhutipur
- Village
- Location within Bihar Location within India
- Coordinates: 25°42′12″N 85°58′20″E
- Country: India
- State: Bihar
- District: Samastipur
- Block: Bibhutpur

Government
  - Type: Sarpanch

Area
  - Total: 18.16 km^{2} (7.01 sq mi)
- Elevation: 45 m (148 ft)

Population (2011)
  - Total: 34,764
  - Density: 1,914/km^{2} (4,958/sq mi)

Languages
  - Local: Hindi, Maithili
- Time zone: UTC+5:30 (IST)
- PIN: 848236
- STD code: 06274
- Vehicle registration: BR-33

Bibhutipur is a large village and the administrative centre of Bibhutipur Block, in the central region of Bihar, India. It is in the southeastern part of Samastipur District. The village had a population of 34,764 per the 2011 India Census.

== Geography ==
Bibhutipur is situated in the western shore of Burhi Gandak River, spanning an area of 1815.88 hectares. It has an average elevation of 45 metres above the sea level.

== Demographics ==
Bibhutipur had a population of 34,764 as of the 2011 census data. Within the local population, 18,143 were male and 16,621 were female. The working population made up of 32.58% of the total population. The village reported 53.03% for the overall literacy rate, with 11,046 of the male residents and 7,390 of the female population being literate.
