= Dalsinghsarai =

Town in Bihar, India

- Town
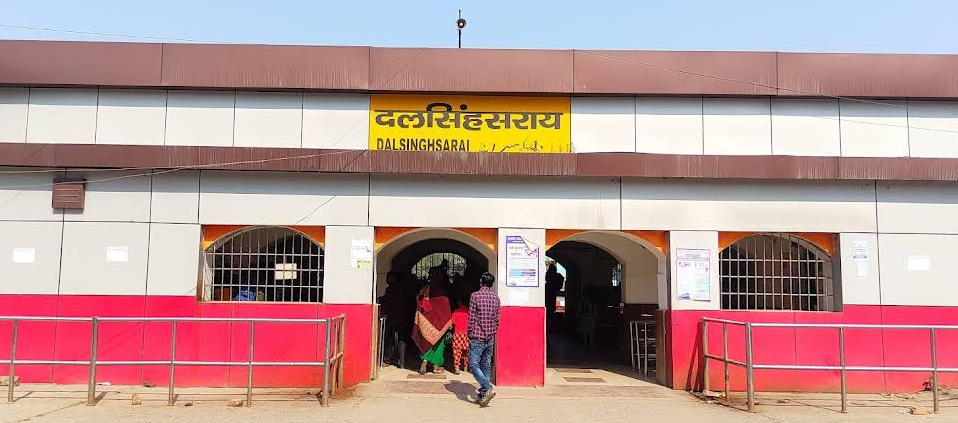
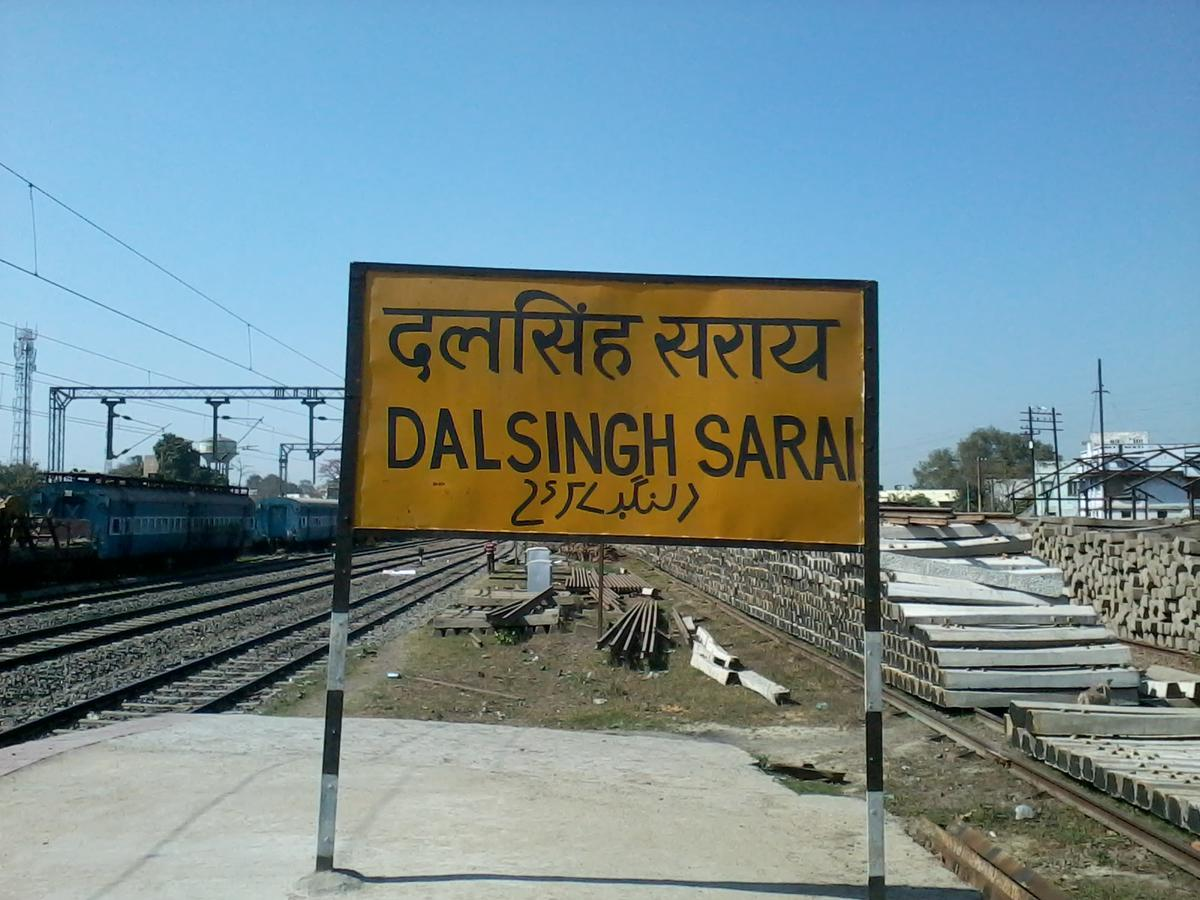
- Interactive map of Dalsinghsarai
- Coordinates: 25.668974°N 85.834892°E
- Country: India
- State: Bihar
- Region: Mithila
- Division: Darbhanga
- District: Samastipur

Government
  - Type: Municipal Council
  - Body: Dalsinghsarai Municipal Council
  - Chief Councilor: Abha Sureka
  - Deputy Chief Councilor: Sujata Choudhary
  - Executive Officer: Shri Abhisar
  - MP: Nityanand Rai (BJP)
  - MLA: Alok Kumar Mehta (RJD)

Area
  - Total: 17.65 km^{2} (6.81 sq mi)
- Elevation: 51.81 m (170.0 ft)

Population (2011)
  - Total: 55,562
  - Density: 3,148/km^{2} (8,153/sq mi)

Languages
  - Official: Hindi
  - Additional official: Urdu
  - Regional Languages: Maithili
- Time zone: UTC+5:30 (IST)
- PIN: 848114
- Telephone code: 06278
- Vehicle registration: BR-33
- Parliamentary Constituency: 22-Ujiarpur
- Assembly Constituency: 134-Ujiarpur

Dalsinghsarai is a town and Municipal Council in the Samastipur District of Bihar, India. It is also one of the subdivisions and blocks of Bihar. It is situated on the bank of the river Balan.

Alok Kumar Mehta is the Member of the Legislative Assembly of Ujiyarpur constituency and Nityanand Rai is the Member of Parliament of Ujiyarpur.

== History ==
The town was the center of indigo cultivation during British rule. In 1902, An Indigo Research Institute was opened nearby in Pusa.

== Climate and Environment ==
Dalsinghsarai experiences a humid subtropical climate characterized by hot summers, mild winters, and a pronounced monsoon season. The region receives an average annual rainfall of approximately 1,137 mm, with about 85% occurring during the southwest monsoon from June to September. Temperatures typically range from 5°C to 20°C during winters (December to February), while summers (April to June) see highs reaching up to 40°C.

The town's environmental landscape is shaped by its location along the Balan River, which contributes to the fertile alluvial soils prevalent in the area and supports agricultural productivity. These soils, part of the north-west alluvial plains, are rejuvenated by periodic river deposits. However, the region is vulnerable to flooding, particularly from the nearby Burhi Gandak River, which frequently exceeds danger levels and impacts Samastipur district, including Dalsinghsarai.

Historically, Dalsinghsarai served as a center for indigo cultivation during the British colonial period, with an experimental indigo farm established there in 1902 to support the industry. These former indigo fields have since integrated into the broader agricultural landscape, though no specific conservation efforts for indigo heritage are documented. Minor air pollution in the area stems primarily from road vehicular traffic and railway operations, contributing to localized particulate matter levels.

== Languages and Religion ==
In Dalsinghsarai, Maithili is the predominant language spoken in daily life by the majority of residents, reflecting its status as the regional language of the Mithila area. Hindi functions as the official language of Bihar state, while Urdu serves as the second official language and is utilized in administrative and official proceedings. Angika is also spoken by some communities in the broader Samastipur district, contributing to linguistic variety.

The religious landscape of Dalsinghsarai is overwhelmingly Hindu, comprising 93.37% of the town's population of 23,862 as per the 2011 census, with Islam forming a minority at 6.55%. Other religions, such as Christianity (0.03%), Buddhism (0.01%), and Jainism (0.01%), represent small, diverse communities within the area.

Religious practices in Dalsinghsarai exhibit influences from Maithili traditions, integrating Hindu customs with the cultural heritage of the Mithila region, which fosters a syncretic approach among the populace. This blend is evident in local observances that highlight the area's historical ties to Mithila.

== Agriculture and Crops ==
Agriculture in Dalsinghsarai forms the backbone of the local economy, employing the majority of the population in farming activities across the fertile Gangetic plains. The region's alluvial soils enable intensive cultivation with multiple cropping cycles per year, primarily during the kharif and rabi seasons.

The key crops grown include rice, wheat, maize, pulses, and a variety of vegetables such as potatoes. Rice dominates as the principal kharif crop, with the Samastipur district contributing 148,189 tons in 2020-21.[28] Wheat and maize are staple rabi crops, supplemented by pulses like gram and lentils, while vegetables and fruits like litchi and mango add diversity to local produce. Historically, the area around Dalsinghsarai was a major center for indigo cultivation during the British colonial period, supporting export-oriented plantations until the early 20th century.

Irrigation practices rely heavily on the Balan River—a tributary of the Burhi Gandak—and associated canal networks, alongside extensive groundwater extraction through tube wells. These sources support a net irrigated area of approximately 66,080 hectares in the district as of 2012, facilitating reliable cropping despite the rainfed portions covering 117,981 hectares. Fresh produce from Dalsinghsarai feeds local markets, with the town's railway connectivity enabling efficient transport of surplus crops to regional hubs.

The region faces challenges from frequent flooding along the Balan River, which can damage crops and infrastructure during monsoons. In response, farmers in nearby villages are increasingly adopting modern techniques, such as floriculture and improved irrigation methods, to enhance resilience and diversify income sources.

== Demographics ==
As of 2011 India census, Dalsinghsarai Nagar Parishad has population of 55,562 of which 28,402 are males while 27,160 are females as per report released by Census India 2011. Population of children with age of 0–6 is 8640 which is 15.55% of total population of Dalsinghsarai.
