= Ajay Kumar Bulganin =

Indian politician

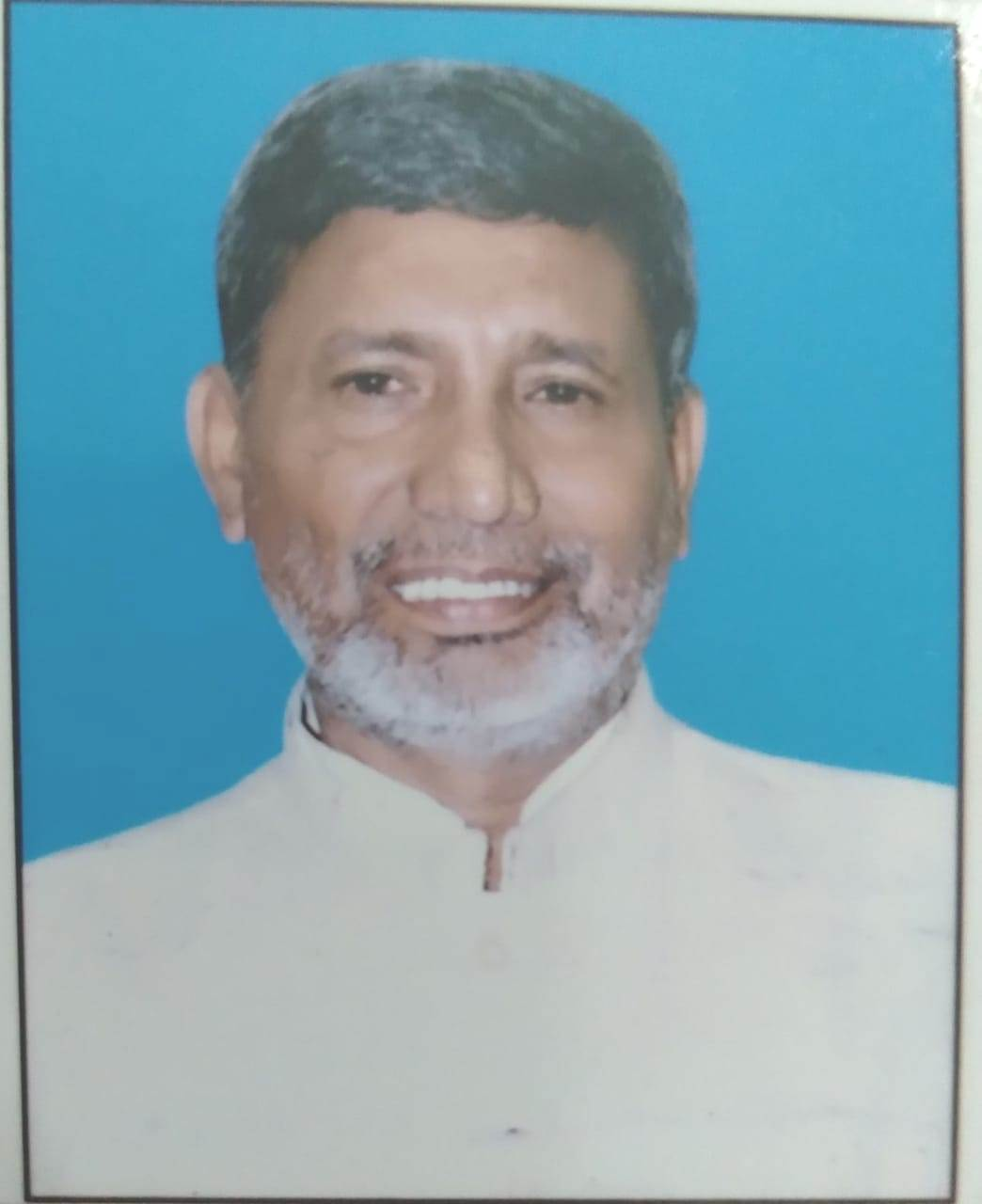

Bihar Legislative Assembly
- In office 2014–2015
- Preceded by: Rana Gangeswar Singh
- Succeeded by: Ejya Yadav
- Constituency: Mohiuddinnagar
- In office February 2005 – 2010
- Preceded by: Ram Chandra Rai
- Succeeded by: Rana Gangeswar Singh

Personal details
- Party: Rashtriya Janata Dal

Ajay Kumar Bulganin is an Indian politician who has served three times as a Member of the Legislative Assembly from the Mohiuddinnagar seat in Bihar . His first victory was in February 2005 Bihar Assembly elections where he was the candidate for the Lok Janashakti Party. He won again October 2005 elections, this time as a member of the RJD. In the 2010 state assembly elections, Rana Gangeswar Singh of Bharatiya Janata Party (BJP) won the Mohiuddinnagar seat defeating Bulganin.

Bulganin regained the seat in a by-election in 2014.

During the 2015 Bihar Legislative Assembly election, Ejya Yadav was selected as the Rashtriya Janata Dal candidate for the seat ahead of Bulganin, who ran as the candidate of the Jan Adhikar Party. Yadav won the race, defeating her nearest competitor, independent Rajesh Singh by over 23,000 votes.
