= Ujiarpur Assembly constituency =

Coordinates: 25°46′38″N 85°47′25″E

Ujiarpur
- Constituency No. 134 for the Bihar Legislative Assembly

Constituency details
- Country: India
- Region: East India
- State: Bihar
- District: Samastipur
- Established: 2008
- Total electors: 310,269

Member of Legislative Assembly
- 18th Bihar Legislative Assembly
- Incumbent Alok Kumar Mehta
- Party: RJD
- Alliance: MGB
- Elected year: 2025

Ujiarpur Assembly constituency is an assembly constituency in Samastipur district in the Indian state of Bihar. The constituency was formed following the Delimitation Order of 2008.

== Overview ==
As per Delimitation of Parliamentary and Assembly constituencies Order, 2008, No. 134 Ujiarpur Assembly constituency is composed of the following: Ujiarpur community development block; Sultanpur Ghataho, Chakbahauddin, Mokhtiyarpur Salkhani, Panr, Pachpaika, Harishankarpur, Kewanta, Nagargama, Pagra, Nawada, Basariya Plgram panchayats and Dalsinghsarai notified area of Dalsinghsarai CD Block.

Ujiarpur Assembly constituency is part of No. 22 Ujiarpur (Lok Sabha constituency).

== Members of the Legislative Assembly ==
Year	Member	Party
1951-2008: Constituency did not exist
2010	Durga Prasad Singh	Rashtriya Janata Dal
2015	Alok Kumar Mehta	Rashtriya Janata Dal
2020	Alok Kumar Mehta	Rashtriya Janata Dal
2025	Alok Kumar Mehta	Rashtriya Janata Dal

== Election results ==
=== 2025 ===
2025 Bihar Legislative Assembly election: Ujiarpur
Party	Candidate	Votes	%	±%
RJD	Alok Kumar Mehta	102,707	44.66	▼4.15
RLM	Prashant Kumar Pankaj	86,424	37.58	
JSP	Durga Prasad Singh	9,502	4.13	
Independent	Upendra kumar	6,452	2.81	
Independent	Ranveer Kumar Chourasiya	3,463	1.51	
Independent	Maha Shanker Choudhary	3,177	1.38	
Independent	Virendra Kumar Ray	3,077	1.34	
Janshakti Vikas Party (Democratic)	Sunita Kumari	2,661	1.16	
AAP	Ankit Kumar Mishra	2,624	1.14	
BSP	Bulbul Kumar Sahni	2,452	1.07	
NOTA	None of the above	2,077	0.9	▲0.39
Majority		16,283	7.08	▼5.46
Turnout		229,995	74.13	▲12.08
RJD hold		Swing		

=== 2020 ===
2020 Bihar Legislative Assembly election: Ujiarpur
Party	Candidate	Votes	%	±%
RJD	Alok Kumar Mehta	90,601	48.81	−3.43
BJP	Sheel Kumar Roy	67,333	36.27	
Independent	Nawal Paswan	4,759	2.56	
Independent	Dinesh Prashad Choudhary	4,575	2.46	
RLSP	Prashant Kumar Pankaj	4,345	2.34	−20.89
Independent	Md. Afaque Ahmad	2,506	1.35	
Rashtriya Jan Jan Party	Baidya Nath Choudhary	1,828	0.98	
NOTA	None of the above	956	0.51	−3.39
Majority		23,268	12.54	−16.47
Turnout		185,633	62.05	+0.44
RJD hold		Swing		

=== 2015 ===
In the 2015 state assembly elections, Alok Kumar Mehta of RJD won the newly constituted Ujiarpur seat.

2015 Bihar Legislative Assembly election: Ujiarpur
Party	Candidate	Votes	%	±%
RJD	Alok Kumar Mehta	85,466	52.24	
RLSP	Kumar Anant	38,006	23.23	
CPI(M)	Ajay Kumar	18,973	11.6	
NOTA	n/a	6,388	3.9	
Independent	Vinod Kumar Ray	3,727	2.28	
Independent	Baiju Kumar Ray	3,156	1.93	
Independent	Ram Kumar Baitha	2,357	1.44	
SS	Rajesh Kumar	1,565	0.96	
NOTA	None of the above	6,388	3.9	
Majority		47,460	29.01	
Turnout		163,614	61.61	
RJD hold		Swing		
