= Prema Chaudhary =

Indian politician

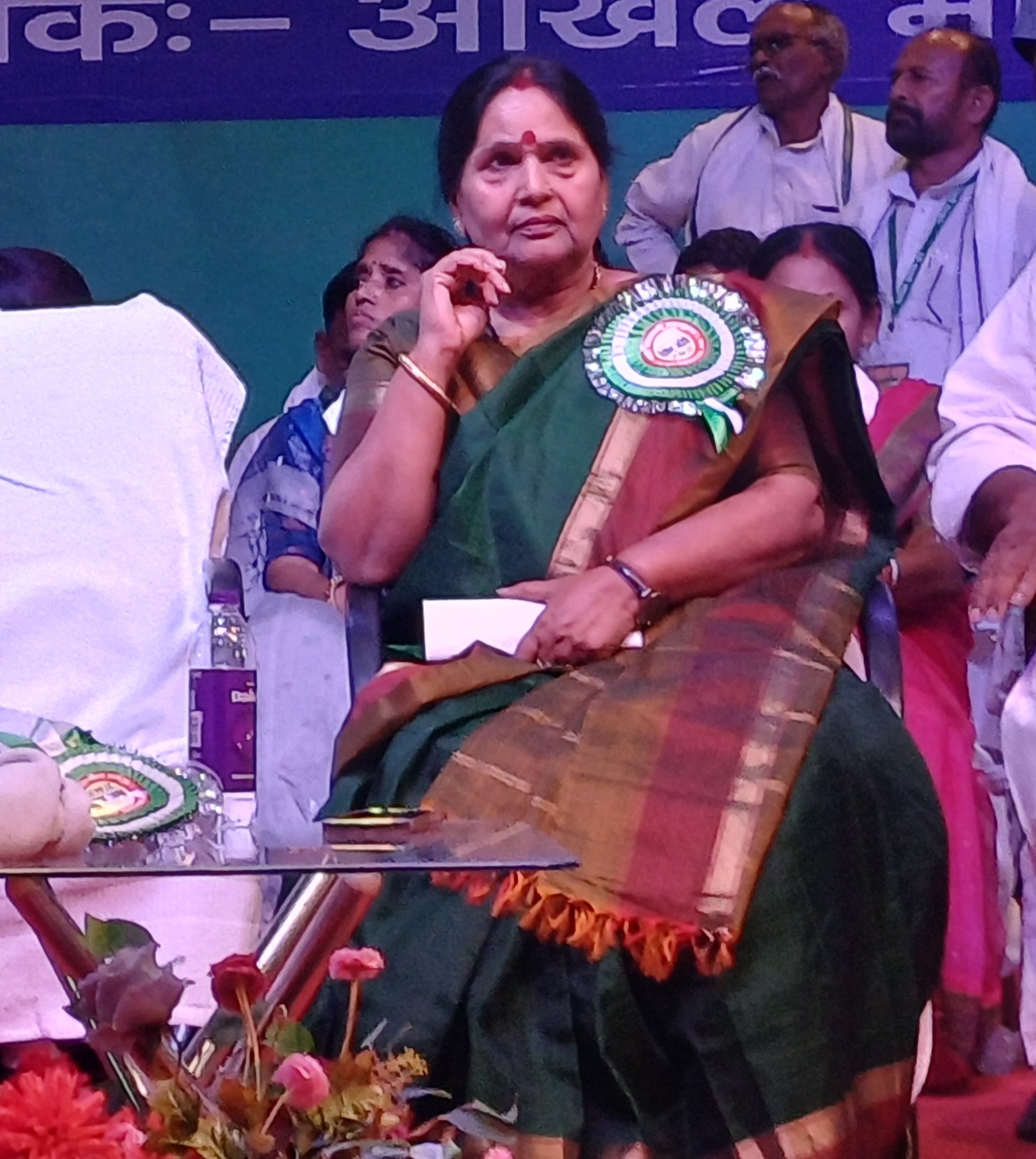

Member of Bihar Legislative Assembly
- In office 2000–2005
- Constituency: Patepur Assembly constituency

Member of Bihar Legislative Assembly
- In office 2005–2010
- Constituency: Patepur Assembly constituency

Member of Bihar Legislative Assembly
- In office 2015–2020
- Constituency: Patepur Assembly constituency

Personal details
- Party: Rashtriya Janata Dal

Prema Chaudhary (born 1945) is an Indian politician from Bihar. She is a three time former member of the Bihar Legislative Assembly from Patepur Assembly constituency, which is reserved for Scheduled Caste community in Vaishali district. She last won the 2015 Bihar Legislative Assembly election representing the Rashtriya Janata Dal.

== Early life and education ==
Chaudhary is from Patepur, Vaishali district, Bihar. She married Doman Mahto. She completed her graduation at a college affiliated with Bhagalpur University, Bhagalpur in 1988.

== Career ==
Chaudhary first became an MLA winning the 2000 Bihar Legislative Assembly election from Patepur Assembly constituency representing the Rashtriya Janata Dal. She polled 60,572 votes and defeated her nearest rival, Mahendra Baitha of Janata Dal (United), by a margin of 12,115 votes. In the February 2005 Bihar Legislative Assembly election, she lost to Baitha. But she regained the seat in the October 2005 Bihar Legislative Assembly election, defeating JD (U)’s Baitha this time around. Again she lost the 2010 election to the same opponent by was elected for the third time winning the 2015 Bihar Legislative Assembly election.

She was expelled by RJD for six years for allegedly indulging in anti party activities. Hours later, on 17 August 2020, she joined Janata Dal (United). But for the 2020 Assembly polls, she was denied a ticket and in September 2021, she quit JD (U) alleging that she was not treated properly in the party.
