= Ram Balak Singh Kushwaha =

Indian politician

Ram Balak Singh
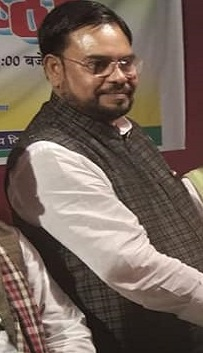

Member (MLA) of Bihar Legislative Assembly
- In office 2010–2015
- Preceded by: Ramdeo Verma
- Constituency: Bibhutipur Assembly constituency, Samastipur.

2nd time MLA from Bibhutipur Assembly constituency.
- In office 2015–2020
- Succeeded by: Ajay Kumar (Bihar politician)

Personal details
- Party: Janata Dal (United)
- Parent: Ram Jeevan Singh (father)

Ram Balak Singh also known as Ram Balak Singh Kushwaha is an Indian politician and former Member of Legislative Assembly (MLA) from the Bibhutipur Assembly Constituency of the Bihar legislative assembly. He is a member of Janata Dal (United) (JDU). He is a two term MLA from the Bibhutipur Assembly Constituency, which is a part of Ujiarpur Lok Sabha Constituency. In 2010 and 2015 assembly elections to Bihar Legislative Assembly, he won as a candidate of Janata Dal (United). In 2015 assembly elections, he defeated Ram Dev Varma of Communist Party of India (Marxist). However, in 2020 assembly elections, he lost to Ajay Kumar of Communist Party of India (Marxist). He has also served on the key position of the ruling party JDU, which includes the General Secretary of Bihar wing of Janata Dal (United).

== Posts held ==
Within the party, the Janata Dal (United), Singh was also appointed as the state president of Farmers and Cooperative cell. The appointment took place after Umesh Singh Kushwaha assumed the charge as State President of Janata Dal United. It was held that the reconstitution of cells were part of reorganization of the party after Ramchandra Prasad Singh was replaced by Lalan Singh as the President of party.

== Criminal conviction ==
Singh was prime accused in a criminal case of murderous attack on the leader of Communist Party of India (Marxist), Lalan Singh. The attack as per First Information Report happened in 2000 and Singh's brother Lal Babu Singh was also an accused in it. A special court in Samastipur found him guilty in 2021 and subsequently, he was awarded 5 years of imprisonment along with fine.

== Other controversies ==
=== Murder charges against brother ===
Singh's brother, Lal Babu Singh was one of the prime accused in the murder of journalist Braj Kumar Singh at Salkhani village in Samastipur. The First Information Report mentioned three person to be involved in the murder, which included Singh's brother.

=== Samastipur double murder case ===
In 2023, Singh was arrested on the charges of being involved in 'Bibhutipur double murder case', that occurred in Samastipur's Singhia Bujurg Panchayat area. Here in this case, the Mukhiya of Singhia Bujurg Panchayat, Surendra Prasad Singh and his associate Satyanarayan Singh was assassinated by hired shooters. Rambalak Singh was the prime accused in this case, as shortly before the murder of the two men, a private video of him was made viral, in which he was spotted with a woman in a hotel room. Singh, however, accused the video to be conspiracy plotted by his political rivals. The two deceased men were found to be responsible for sharing of the private video of Singh, as a consequence of which, they were murdered. Singh's brother was also one of the accused besides him in this case, and was arrested earlier.

There was massive protest by the supporters of deceased Mukhiya in Samastipur, the murder was followed by traffic blockade and street protest in the city.
