= Kumar Bajitpur =

- Raghopur Narsanda
- Location in Bihar, India Kumar Bajitpur (India)
- Country: India
- State: Bihar
- District: Vaishali
- Elevation: 46 m (151 ft)

Population (2011)
  - Total: 15,540

Languages
  - Spoken: Hindi, English, Bajjika, Bhojpuri
- Time zone: UTC+5:30 (IST)
- PIN: 843110
- Telephone code: 91- 6227- XX XX XX
- Vehicle registration: BR-31
- Sex ratio: 1.0870 ♂/♀
- Lok Sabha constituency: Ujiarpur
- Vidhan Sabha constituency: Patepur
- Website: vaishali.bih.nic.in

Kumar Bajitpur is a village located in the Vaishali district of Bihar, East India.

== Demographics ==
As per 2011 census Kumar Bajitpur city has a population of 15,540, out of which males were 7,845 and females were 7,695. The literacy rate was 79.26 per cent, higher than the national average of 74.04%: male literacy is 84.78%, and female literacy is 72.93%. In Kumar Bajitpur, 16% of the population is under 6 years of age.. The sex ratio of 873 females per 1,000 males was lower than the national average of 944.

=== Climate ===
Climate data for Kumar Bajitpur (Raghopur Narsanda)
Month	Jan	Feb	Mar	Apr	May	Jun	Jul	Aug	Sep	Oct	Nov	Dec	Year
Mean daily maximum °C (°F)	23.3 (73.9)	26.5 (79.7)	32.6 (90.7)	37.7 (99.9)	41.9 (107.4)	39.7 (103.5)	33.0 (91.4)	32.4 (90.3)	32.3 (90.1)	31.5 (88.7)	28.8 (83.8)	24.7 (76.5)	31.53 (88.75)
Mean daily minimum °C (°F)	7.2 (45.0)	11.6 (52.9)	16.4 (61.5)	22.3 (72.1)	25.2 (77.4)	26.7 (80.1)	26.2 (79.2)	26.1 (79.0)	25.7 (78.3)	21.8 (71.2)	12.7 (54.9)	6.9 (44.4)	19.65 (67.37)
Average precipitation mm (inches)	19 (0.7)	11 (0.4)	11 (0.4)	8 (0.3)	33 (1.3)	134 (5.3)	306 (12.0)	274 (10.8)	227 (8.9)	94 (3.7)	9 (0.4)	4 (0.2)	1,130 (44.5)
Source: Local Source & The Weather Channel Interactive, Inc. (Yahoo! News Weather)
