= Musrigharari =

- Town/Nagar Panchayat
- Location in Bihar, India Musrigharari (India)
- Coordinates: 25°48′19″N 85°44′19″E
- Country: India
- State: Bihar
- District: Samastipur

Languages
  - Official: Hindi
  - Additional official: Urdu
  - Regional: Mithila
- Time zone: UTC+5:30 (IST)
- PIN: 848103
- Coastline: 0 kilometres (0 mi)

Musrigharari is a Nagar Panchayat town in Samastipur district of Bihar, India. Musrigharari is located at an approximate distance of 8 kilometers from the city of Samastipur.

It has very busy roads and this area is still developing. Other neighboring villages are connected to it via roads. The development in this area is mainly due to well connected roads and its location. Years ago this region was, like any other village, not so populated, but as time went by peoples from neighboring villages bought lands and began settling here, as it served a good location to open shops and other businesses. Other reasons included its proximity to other big towns. There is an intersection of 4 roads around which the shops are mostly concentrated and DURGA PUJA is major Hindu festival, which are celebrated on wide range, in this festival all religious are participated, Big Durga pandal prepared during puja, it also serves as a site for events of Muharram, which is a major festival for Muslims here.

It serves as an area for business purposes, education, recreation and religious purposes. People from neighboring villages and towns send their kids to schools in this area. Main business shops include cloth stores, Vegetable shops and food item shops, and hardware and electronic shops. There are many Hindu temples devoted to many Hindu deities, like the goddesses Kali or Shiva. There are also some mosques in the town.

School, college and private tutoring institutions are also present in abundance. Its main religions are Hinduism and Islam and other religions such as Buddhism or Sikhism are present in negligible amount. The literacy rate is below average and there are many people who believes in superstitions and other religious and cultural myths, as is the case of neighboring villages and towns or literally most peoples of Bihar. At Musarigharari now become education hub, Many education institute at here, one of them Galaxy Coaching,

== Location ==
The four-lane National Highway 28 & National Highway 322 (AH42) passes through Musrigharari.
