= Ajay Kumar Kushwaha =

Indian politician from Bihar

Ajay Kushwaha
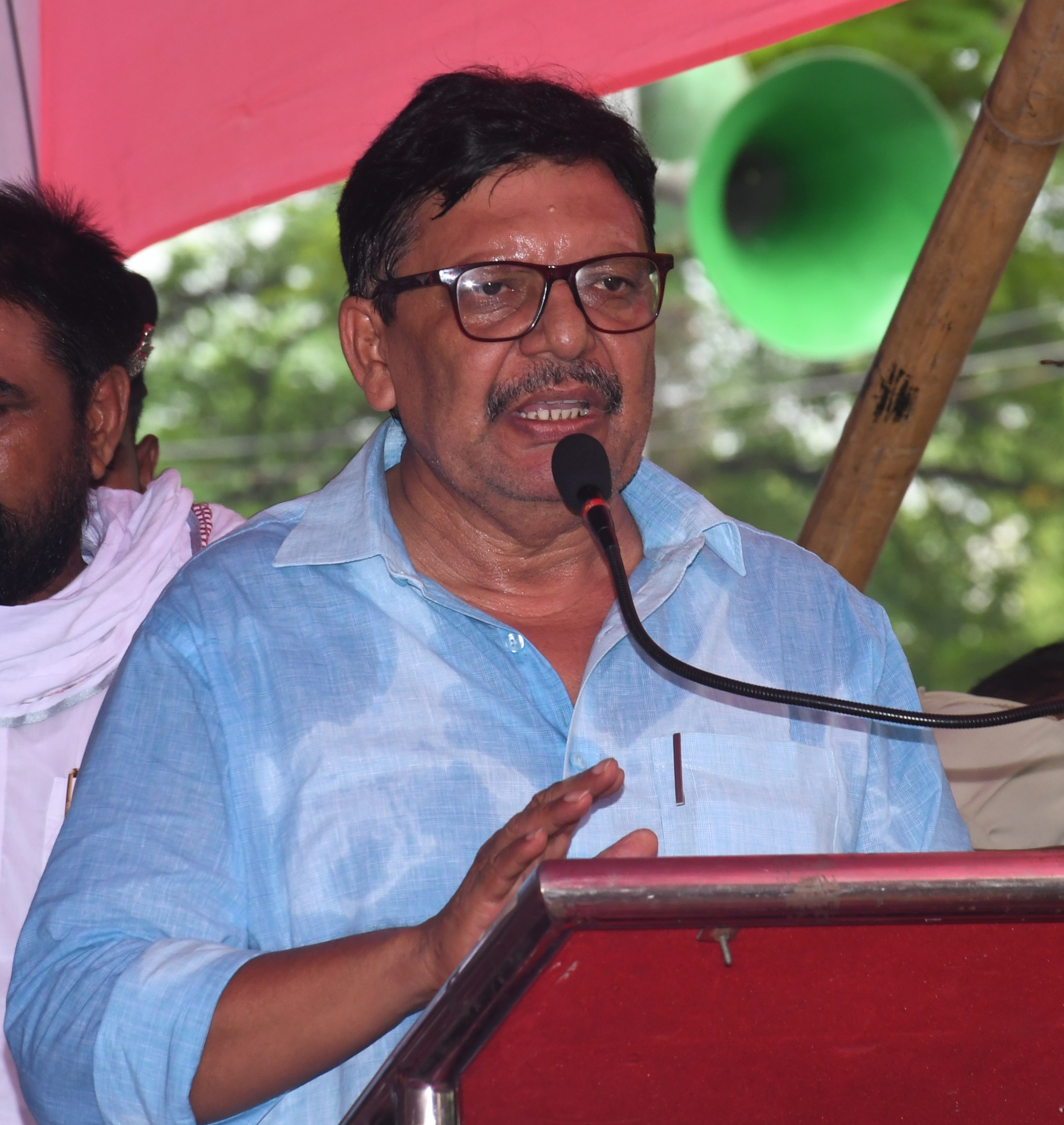
- Kumar addressing a demonstration of Nyojit teachers at Gardanibagh, Patna, Bihar, India on 11 July 2023.

Member of Bihar Legislative Assembly
- Incumbent
- Assumed office 10 November 2020
- Preceded by: Ram Balak Singh Kushwaha
- Constituency: Bibhutipur Assembly constituency

Leader of Communist Party of India (Marxist) in Bihar Legislative Assembly
- Incumbent
- Assumed office 10 November 2020

Personal details
- Party: CPIM

Ajay Kumar also known as Ajay Kushwaha is an Indian politician and leader of the legislative party of Communist Party of India (Marxist) in Bihar Legislative Assembly. He got elected from Bibhutipur Vidhan Sabha Constituency in 2020 Bihar State Assembly Elections. In 2020 Bihar Legislative Assembly elections, he defeated Ram Balak Singh of Janata Dal (United) by a margin of 40,496 votes.

== Life ==
He is the son of Yogendra Singh Kushwaha. He completed Post Graduate in 1993 from Samastipur College. In 1996 he completed LL.B from BS College Sultanganj.

== Political career ==
=== 2019 Lok Sabha election ===
Ajay Kumar was the CPI(M) candidate in Ujiarpur for 2019 Lok Sabha Election.

=== 2020 Bihar State Assembly elections ===
Ajay Kumar won the Bibhutipur Vidhan Sabha Constituency, in Mithila region and Samastipur district of Bihar.

2020 Bihar Legislative Assembly election: Bibhutipur
Party	Candidate	Votes	%	±%
CPI(M)	Ajay Kumar	73,822	45.0	+17.08
JD(U)	Rambalak Singh	33,326	20.31	−19.45
LJP	Chandra Bali Thakur	28,811	17.56	−4.6
Turnout		164,051		
CPI(M) gain from JD(U)		Swing	+17.08	
