= Rajesh Kumar Singh (Bihar politician, born 1974) =

Indian politician

Member of the Bihar Legislative Assembly
- Incumbent
- Assumed office November 2020
- Chief Minister: Nitish Kumar
- Preceded by: Ejya Yadav
- Constituency: Mohiuddinnagar

Personal details
- Born: 4 March 1974 (age 52)
- Party: Bharatiya Janata Party
- Parent: Kameshwar Singh
- Education: Graduation
- Occupation: MLA
- Profession: Social Service and Agriculture

Rajesh Kumar Singh is an Indian politician, currently a member of the Bhartiya Janata Party and a MLA from Mohiuddinnagar constituency of Bihar.
