= Alok Kumar Mehta =

Indian politician

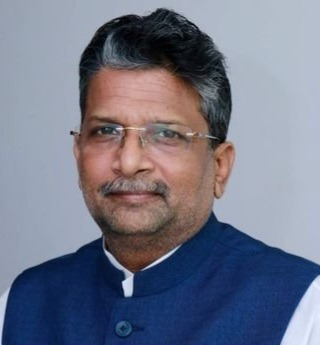

Member of Parliament, Lok Sabha
- In office May 2004 – April 2009
- Preceded by: Manjay Lal
- Succeeded by: Ashwamedh Devi
- Constituency: Samastipur

Minister for Revenue and Land Reforms, Government of Bihar
- In office 16 August 2022 – 20 January 2024

Member of Bihar Legislative Assembly
- Incumbent
- Assumed office November 2015
- Preceded by: Durga Prasad Singh
- Constituency: Ujiarpur

National General Secretary of Rashtriya Janata Dal
- Incumbent
- Assumed office Incumbent

Minister of Education Government of Bihar
- In office 20 January 2024 – 28 January 2024
- Preceded by: Chandrashekhar Yadav
- Succeeded by: Vijay Kumar Chaudhary

Minister of Co-operative Government of Bihar
- In office 20 November 2015 – 26 July 2017
- Chief Minister: Nitish Kumar
- Preceded by: Ram Lakhan Ram Raman
- Succeeded by: Rana Randhir

Personal details
- Born: 3 November 1966 (age 59)
- Party: Rashtriya Janata Dal
- Spouse: Seema Prasad
- Children: 3

Alok Kumar Mehta (born 3 November 1966) is an Indian politician from the state of Bihar. He is a founder member of Rashtriya Janata Dal and has served as Principal General Secretary of the party. Mehta is said to be political mentor of Tejashwi Yadav. Mehta is considered as a veteran leader of Rashtriya Janata Dal. He has served as minister with important portfolios in almost every government of RJD. He had also served as the chairman of The Vaishali Co-operative Bank being one of the founder of this institution.

== Political career ==
A son of Tulsidas Mehta, Alok Kumar Mehta was elected a Member of Legislative Assembly (MLA) for the Ujiyarpur state assembly constituency in the 2015 Bihar Legislative Assembly election. He served as Minister to the Department of Co-operatives in the Government of Bihar, until 2017 when the Chief Minister, Nitish Kumar resigned. His sister Suheli Mehta is also a politician who joined Janata Dal (United), a rival political party of RJD in 2017.

Mehta has also been a Member of Parliament from the Ujiarpur Lok Sabha constituency in 2004. He later lost the seat to Ashwamedh Devi, the widow of veteran Pradip Mahto in 2009. Mehta has been associated with Rashtriya Janata Dal at different times under different charges. He has been the incharge of the RJD for seven states and National General Secretary of youth RJD. He also served as the state General Secretary of Youth Rashtriya Janata Dal.

In his capacity as the Member of Parliament, he has served as the Member of Committee on Private Members` Bills and Resolutions, Member of Committee on Transport, Tourism and Culture; Member of Committee on Absence of Members from the Sittings of the House; Member of Parliamentary Forum on Youth and Member of Committee on Transport, Tourism & Culture.

Mehta has also served as the General Secretary of the RJD. In August 2020, while serving in his capacity as the General Secretary of the party he expelled the three rebel MLAs of the party amidst the polls of 2020 to Bihar Legislative Assembly.

In 2020 elections to Bihar assembly, Mehta defeated Sheel Kumar Roy of Bhartiya Janata Party with a margin of over 23000 votes to retain Ujiarpur seat.

In 2023, following the anti- coalition politics of Upendra Kushwaha, the possibility of denting of Kushwaha Vote Bank led Mahagathbandhan (Bihar) and the Rashtriya Janata Dal (RJD) to project Mehta as the leader of Kushwaha caste. In February 2023, RJD organised the celebration of birth anniversary of the socialist leader Jagdeo Prasad, in a bid to reach the community. In all such reach out campaigns, Mehta was kept at the forefront by the party. In one such program organised by RJD, Mehta ensured his community that they will get proper share in the power structure on the behalf of RJD.

Mehta was fielded as the candidate of Rashtriya Janata Dal from his traditional Ujiarpur Assembly constituency and he was successful in defeating Prashant Kumar Pankaj of Rashtriya Lok Morcha by securing over 1 lakh votes, despite RJD's poor performance in this election .

== Tenure as Minister for Revenue and Land Reform ==
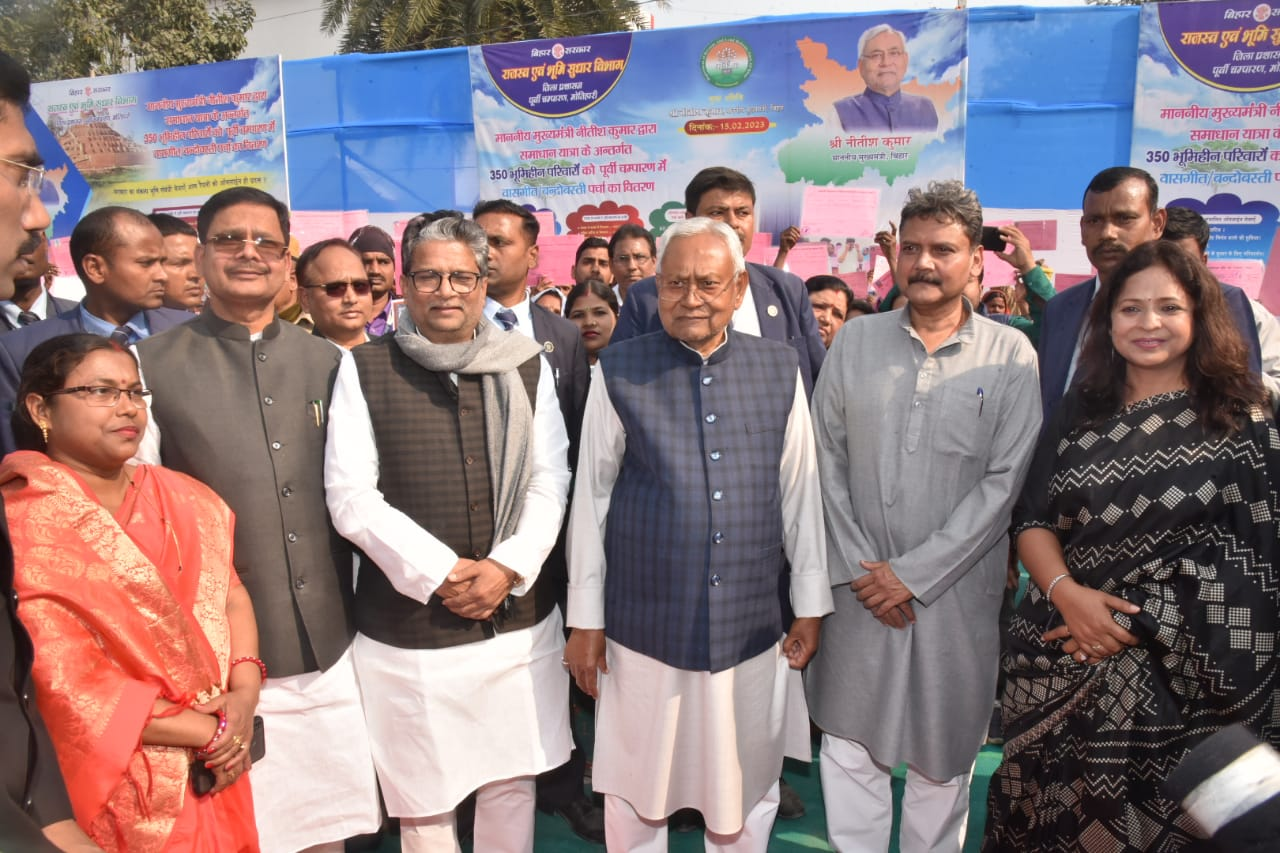
Alok Kumar Mehta as minister for revenue and land reform (standing to the left of Bihar Chief Minister, Nitish Kumar), during Samadhan Yatra (reachout campaign of Chief Minister to oversee implementation of schemes.)

In 2022, Mehta was serving as the revenue and land reforms minister in the Nitish Kumar cabinet. As revenue minister, he announced that the ministry has formulated a program for providing the homestead land to landless households from Schedule Castes, Schedule Tribe and Other Backward Class families. A mobile app was also launched by him, which would register the beneficiary, and give information about the families, which are landless. Mehta announced that government will provide 5 decimals of land to the landless households, and at places where government land is not available, the government will purchase land for this purpose.

In 2024, Mehta was serving as the Minister of Education in the Nitish Kumar cabinet.

== See also ==
- Loknath Mahto
- Bhubneshwar Prasad Mehta
