= Sarairanjan Assembly constituency =

Coordinates: 25°44′48″N 85°45′26″E

Sarairanjan
- Constituency No. 136 for the Bihar Legislative Assembly

Constituency details
- Country: India
- Region: East India
- State: Bihar
- District: Samastipur
- Established: 1967
- Total electors: 283,203

Member of Legislative Assembly
- 18th Bihar Legislative Assembly
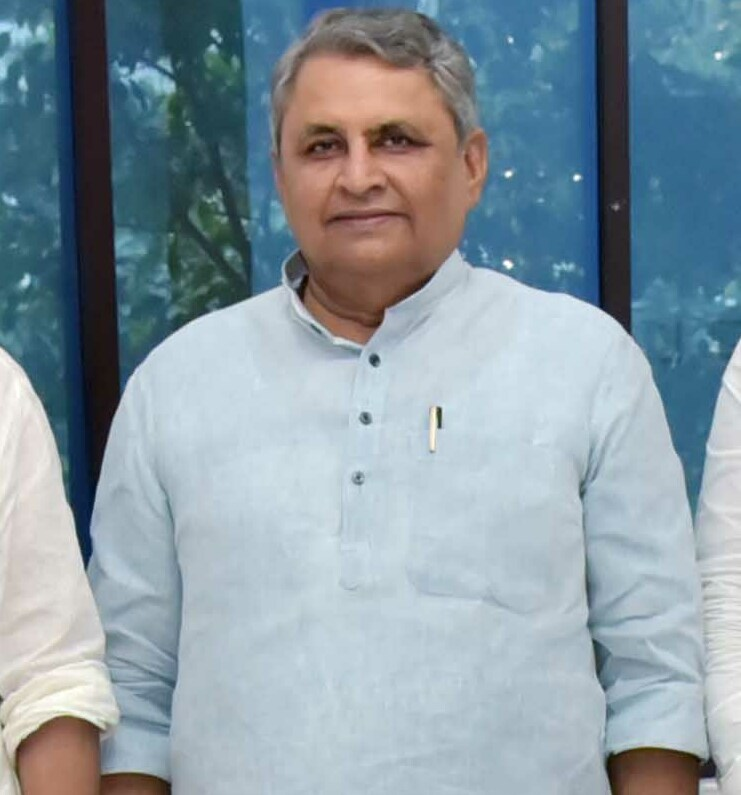
- Incumbent Vijay Kumar Chaudhary; Deputy Chief Minister of Bihar
- Party: JD(U)
- Alliance: NDA
- Elected year: 2025

Sarairanjan Assembly constituency is an assembly constituency in Samastipur district in the Indian state of Bihar.

== Overview ==
As per Delimitation of Parliamentary and Assembly constituencies Order, 2008, No. 136 Sarairanjan Assembly constituency is composed of the following: Sarairanjan and Vidyapati Nagar community development blocks.

Sarairanjan Assembly constituency is part of No. 22 Ujiarpur (Lok Sabha constituency).

== Members of the Legislative Assembly ==
Year	Name	Party
1967	Ramvilas Mishra	Samyukta Socialist Party
1969	Ramvilas Mishra	Samyukta Socialist Party
1972	Chandreshwar Prasad	Bharatiya Jana Sangh
1977	Yashoda Nand Singh	Janata Party
1980	Ramvilas Mishra	Janata Party
1985	Ramashray Ishwar	Indian National Congress
1990	Ramvilas Mishra	Janata Dal
1995	Ram Ashray Sahni	Janata Dal
2000	Ram Ashray Sahni	Rashtriya Janata Dal
2005	Ramchandra Singh Nishad	Rashtriya Janata Dal
2005	Ramchandra Singh Nishad	Rashtriya Janata Dal
2010	Vijay Kumar Chaudhary	Janata Dal (United)
2015	Vijay Kumar Chaudhary	Janata Dal (United)
2020	Vijay Kumar Chaudhary	Janata Dal (United)
2025	Vijay Kumar Chaudhary	Janata Dal (United)

^by-election

== Election results ==
=== 2025 ===
2025 Bihar Legislative Assembly election: Sarairanjan
Party	Candidate	Votes	%	±%
JD(U)	Vijay Kumar Chaudhary	102,792	49.37	+6.89
RJD	Arbind Kumar Sahani	81,994	39.38	−0.98
Independent	Kunal Kumar	6,182	2.97	
JSP	Sajan Kumar Mishra	5,493	2.64	
Independent	Ranjit Kumar Pandit	4,059	1.95	
NOTA	None of the above	4,428	2.13	−0.33
Majority		20,798	9.99	+7.87
Turnout		208,189	73.51	+12.65
JD(U) hold		Swing		

=== 2020 ===
2020 Bihar Legislative Assembly election: Sarairanjan
Party	Candidate	Votes	%	±%
JD(U)	Vijay Kumar Chaudhary	72,666	42.48	−10.75
RJD	Arbind Kumar Sahni	69,042	40.36	
LJP	Abhash Kumar Jha	11,224	6.56	
Aam Adhikar Morcha	Bulbul Kumar Sahni	2,885	1.69	
RLSP	Anita Kumari	2,657	1.55	
Bhartiya Sablog Party	Ram Kishor Choudhary	2,298	1.34	
Independent	Nikki Jha	2,289	1.34	
NOTA	None of the above	4,200	2.46	−2.33
Majority		3,624	2.12	−20.24
Turnout		171,050	60.86	+1.54
JD(U) hold		Swing		

=== 2015 ===
2015 Bihar Legislative Assembly election: Sarairanjan
Party	Candidate	Votes	%	±%
JD(U)	Vijay Kumar Choudhary	81,055	53.23	
BJP	Ranjeet Nirguni	47,011	30.87	
JMM	Lalan Kumar Ishwar	3,565	2.34	
Independent	Rabindar Parsad Ray	3,051	2.0	
CPI	Ram Vilas Roy Vimal	2,262	1.49	
Loktantrik Sarvjan Samaj Party	Nandkishor Sah	1,492	0.98	
SP	Sajan Kumar Mishra	1,487	0.98	
NOTA	None of the above	7,294	4.79	
Majority		34,044	22.36	
Turnout		152,273	59.32	
