= Samastipur district =

District in Bihar, India

- District
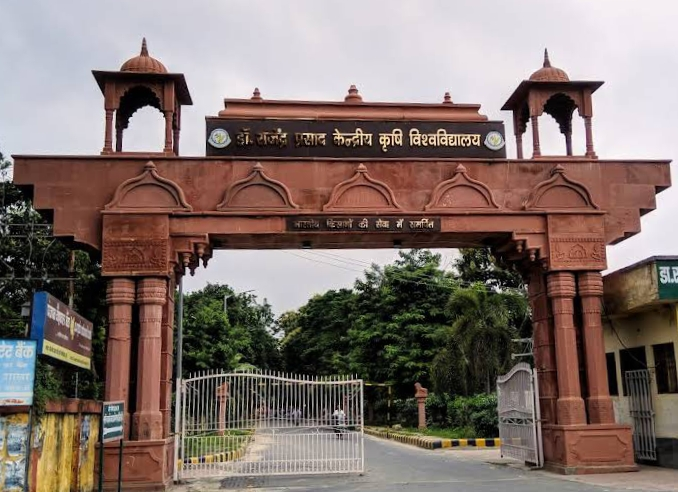
- Dr. Rajendra Prasad Central Agriculture University

- Location of Samastipur district in Bihar
- Country: India
- State: Bihar
- Division: Darbhanga
- Headquarters: Samastipur
- Subdivisions: Samastipur, Dalsinghsarai, Rosera, Patori

Government
  - Lok Sabha Constituencies: Samastipur, Ujiarpur
  - Vidhan Sabha Constituencies: Kalyanpur, Warisnagar, Samastipur, Ujiarpur, Morwa, Sarairanjan, Mohiuddinnagar, Bibhutipur, Rosera, Hasanpur

Area
  - Total: 2,904 km^{2} (1,121 sq mi)

Population (2011)
  - Total: 4,261,566
  - Density: 1,467/km^{2} (3,801/sq mi)
- Demonym: Maithil

Demographics (2011)
  - Literacy: 61.86%
  - Sex ratio: 911 females/1000 males

Languages
  - Official language: Mother language: Hindi; Maithili
- Time zone: UTC+05:30 (IST)
- PIN: 848101 (Samastipur)
- Vehicle registration: BR33
- Major highways: NH-122, NH-322
- Website: samastipur.nic.in

Samastipur district is one of the thirty-eight districts of Bihar in India. The district headquarters are located at Samastipur. The district occupies an area of 2904km² and has a population of 4,261,566.

Samastipur was the largest milk producing district of Bihar in 2022.

== History ==
Samastipur became a district in 1972 when it was split from Darbhanga district.

Samastipur consists of four sub-divisions:

1. Rosera
2. Samastipur
3. Dalsinghsarai
4. Shahpur Patori

Historically, the Samastipur district has been dominated by Koeri, Yadav and Dusadh castes. There is also a sizeable presence of Bhumihars in some of the regions, but they wield less political influence, as they are not united politically. For this reason, most of the total ten assembly constituencies falling in this district has been dominated by Koeris. The two Lok Sabha constituencies, which are part of this district are also dominated by Koeris and Dusadhs. It has been recorded that in this district, the Koeri and Bhumihar castes are indulged in criminality, as they are politically strong.

== Geography ==
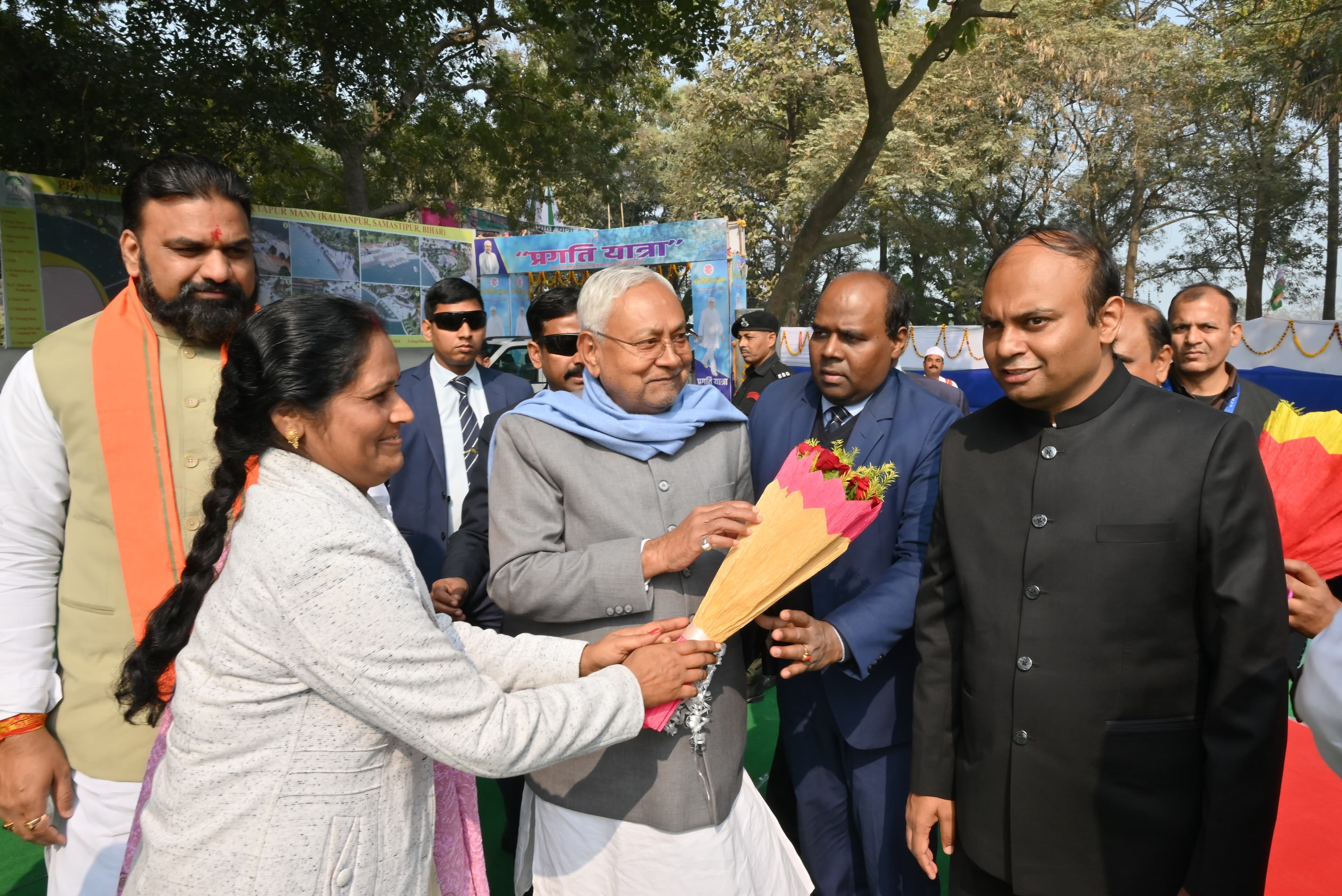
CM Nitish Kumar laid the foundation stone of ROB construction work on NH-322 in Samastipur with Deputy Chief Minister Samrat Choudhary and Samastipur District Magistrate Raushan Kushwaha.

Samastipur district occupies an area of 2,904 square kilometres (1,121 sq mi), comparatively equivalent to Indonesia's Muna Island. Samastipur is bounded on the north by the Bagmati River which forms part of the border with Darbhanga district. On the west it is bordered by Vaishali and Muzaffarpur districts, and on the south by the Ganga, which forms the border with Patna district, while on its southeast are the Begusarai and Khagaria districts. The district headquarters is located at Samastipur. The district is largely agricultural farmland with very little forest cover.

There are 20 blocks in the Samastipur district:

- Samastipur
- Kalyanpur
- Pusa
- Warisnagar
- Tajpur
- Khanpur
- Sarairanjan
- Ujiarpur
- Rosera
- Singhia
- Hasanpur
- Bithan
- Bibhutpur
- Shivaji Nagar
- Dalsinghsarai
- Patori
- Vidyapati Nagar
- Mohiuddinagar
- Mohanpur
- Morwa

== Politics ==
Ujiarpur Lok Sabha constituency and Samastipur Lok Sabha constituency are the Parliament constituencies.

District	No.	Constituency	Name	Party	Alliance	Remarks
Samastipur	131	Kalyanpur	Maheshwar Hazari	JD(U)	NDA	
Samastipur	132	Warisnagar	Manjarik Mrinal	JD(U)	NDA	
Samastipur	133	Samastipur	Ashwamedh Devi	JD(U)	NDA	
Samastipur	134	Ujiarpur	Alok Kumar Mehta	RJD	MGB	
Samastipur	135	Morwa	Ranvijay Sahu	RJD	MGB	
Samastipur	136	Sarairanjan	Vijay Kumar Chaudhary	JD(U)	NDA	Deputy Chief Minister (Since 15 April 2026)
Samastipur	137	Mohiuddinnagar	Rajesh Kumar Singh	BJP	NDA	
Samastipur	138	Bibhutipur	Ajay Kumar Kushwaha	CPI(M)	MGB	
Samastipur	139	Rosera (SC)	Birendra Kumar	BJP	NDA	
Samastipur	140	Hasanpur	Raj Kumar Ray	JD(U)	NDA	

== Economy ==
In 2006 the Ministry of Panchayati Raj named Samastipur one of the country's 250 most backward districts (out of a total of 640). It is one of the 36 districts in Bihar receiving funds from the Backward Regions Grant Fund Programme (BRGF).

== Education ==
Samastipur has several schools and colleges. Most of the colleges are affiliated to the Lalit Narayan Mithila University, Darbhanga. The Dr. Rajendra Prasad Central Agriculture University, is located near the town, in Pusa. This university was constructed in 1970 near the ruins of Pusa Institute which was the Indian Agricultural Research Institute built during the British regime.

Samastipur has medical college namely Shri Ram Janki Medical College and Hospital and a private nursing college namely AHS Nursing College & Hospital situated in Tajpur Road, Samastipur, both are recognised by Government of Bihar and affiliated by Bihar University of Health Sciences.

IGNOU has several study centres in Samastipur.

== Demographics ==
Religions in Samastipur district (2011)
Religion	Percent
Hinduism	89.18%
Islam	10.62%
Other or not stated	0.20%

According to the 2011 census Samastipur district has a population of 4,261,566, roughly equal to the Republic of the Congo or the US state of Kentucky. This gives it a ranking of 45th in India (out of a total of 640). The district has a population density of 1,467 inhabitants per square kilometre (3,800/sq mi). Its population growth rate over the decade 2001-2011 was 25.53%. Samastipur has a sex ratio of 911 females for every 1000 males, and a literacy rate of 61.86%. 3.47% of the population lives in urban areas. Scheduled Castes and Scheduled Tribes make up 18.85% and 0.04% of the population respectively.

Languages of Samstipur district (2011)
1. Hindi (52.3%)
2. Maithili (30.8%)
3. Urdu (8.40%)
4. 'Other' Hindi (8.29%)
5. Others (0.20%)

At the time of the 2011 Census of India, 52.32% of the population in the district spoke Hindi, 30.79% Maithili and 8.40% Urdu as their first language. 8.29% of the population recorded their language as 'Others' under Hindi.

== Notable people ==
- Ram Balak Singh Kushwaha, two term Member of Bihar Legislative Assembly
- Karpoori Thakur, Chief Minister of Bihar
- Vaibhav Sooryavanshi, Indian cricketer
- Anukul Roy, Indian cricketer

== See also ==
- Pandav Sthan
- Vidyapati Dham
- Government Engineering College, Samastipur
- Shri Ram Janki Medical College and Hospital, Samastipur
- AHS Nursing College & Hospital
- Dr. Rajendra Prasad Central Agriculture University
- Rohua Warisnagar (village)
