= 1967 Bihar Legislative Assembly election =

Legislative Assembly election in Bihar, India

- 21 February 1967

All 318 seats in the Bihar Legislative Assembly 160 seats needed for a majority
- Registered: 27,743,190
- Turnout: 51.51%

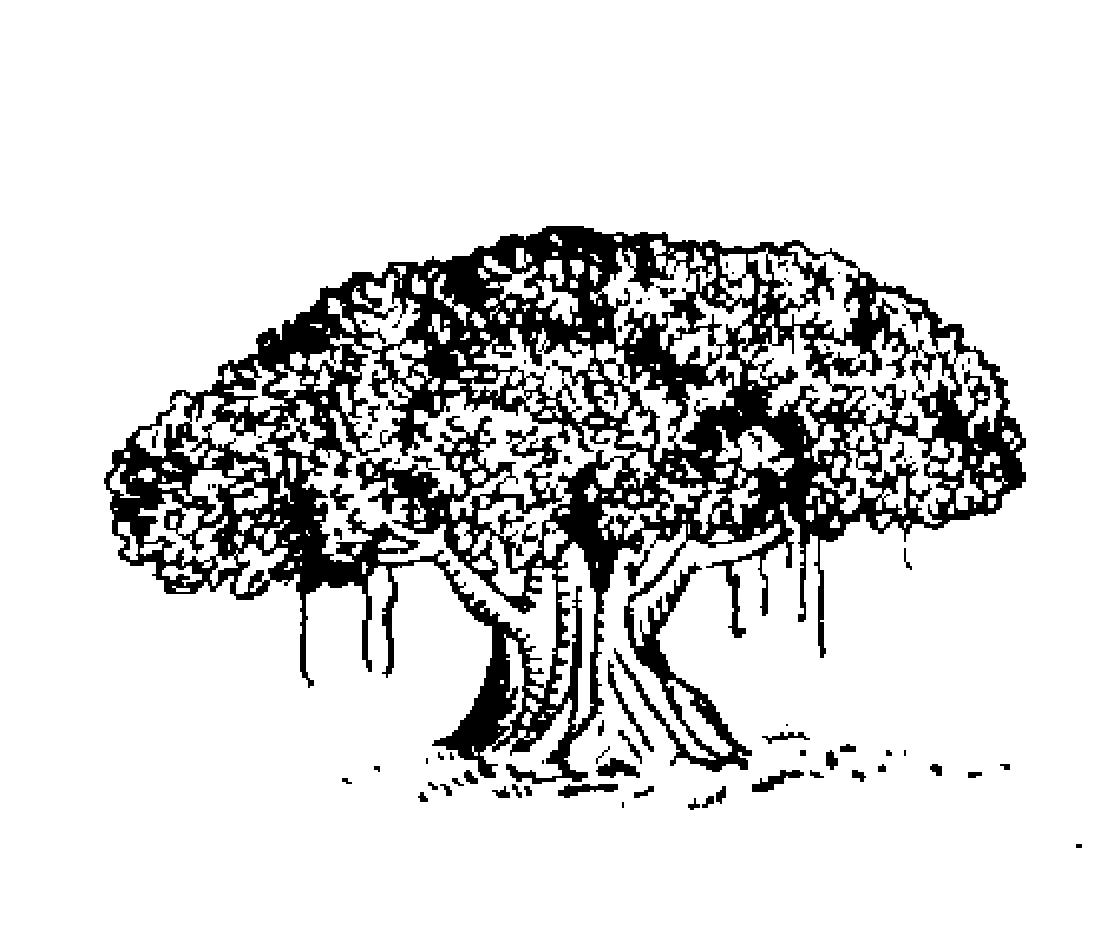

	Majority party	Minority party	Third party
Party	INC	SSP	ABJS
Seats before	185	New	3
Seats won	128	68	26
Seat change	▼57	New	▲23
Popular vote	33.09%	17.62%	10.42%
CM before election
K. B. Sahay
INC
Elected CM
Mahamaya Prasad Sinha
Jana Kranti Dal

Elections to the Bihar Legislative Assembly were held in February 1967, to elect members of the 318 constituencies in Bihar, India. The Indian National Congress won the most seats as well as the popular vote, but Mahamaya Prasad Sinha of the Jana Kranti Dal was appointed as the Chief Minister of Bihar. No single party had won a majority of seats,

== Government formation ==
=== 1st Government ===
Parties like Samyukt Socialist Party, Jan Sangh, CPI, Jan Kranti Dal and Praja Socialist together formed the government. Although the second largest party after Congress was the Samyukt Socialist Party and its leader Karpoori Thakur had a stake in the post of Chief Minister, but other parties were not ready.In such a situation, all the parties agreed on the name of Mahamaya Prasad Sinha of Jan Kranti Dal(of Kamakhya Narain Singh), who became the Chief Minister of Bihar in March 1967, while Karpoori Thakur became the Deputy Chief Minister. However, the government couldn't last even for a year.

=== 2nd Government ===
Opposition to the caste composition of the ministry led to some members of the samyukt socialist party, provoked by Health minister BP Mandal(who was forced to resign by Ram Manohar Lohia), join hands with the congress to form new government headed by first backward chief minister BP Mandal, which lasted just 50 days.

=== 3rd Government ===
However, there was a tussle going on within the Congress on the issue of supporting the Mandal government. Angered by this decision of the party, 17 MLAs rebelled under the leadership of former Chief Minister Binodanand Jha, leader of the anti-KB Sahay group. Formed a separate faction in the name of Loktrantik Congress and withdrew support from the Mandal government. Only one month old BP Mandal government had to resign and in the new manipulation, MLA of this Loktrantik Congress camp, Bhola Paswan Shastri became first Dalit chief minister with the help of opposition MLAs. Even his ministry lasted for just 4 months

The weakening of previously dominant congress party, rising aspirations of backward classes(forward-backward tussle) and individual greed of leaders was the main reasons for these short lived govertments.

== Result ==
Party	Votes	%	Seats	+/–
Indian National Congress	4,479,460	33.09	128	▼57
Samyukta Socialist Party	2,385,961	17.62	68	New
Bharatiya Jana Sangh	1,410,722	10.42	26	▲23
Praja Socialist Party	942,889	6.96	18	▼11
Communist Party of India	935,977	6.91	24	▲12
Jan Kranti Dal	451,412	3.33	13	New
Swatantra Party	315,184	2.33	3	▼47
Communist Party of India (Marxist)	173,656	1.28	4	New
Republican Party of India	23,893	0.18	1	New
Independents	2,419,469	17.87	33	▼21
Total	13,538,623	100.00	318	0
Valid votes	13,538,623	73.37		
Invalid/blank votes	4,914,436	26.63		
Total votes	18,453,059	100.00		
Registered voters/turnout	27,743,190	66.51		
Source: ECI

== Elected members ==
#	Constituency	Reserved for (SC/ST/None)	Member	Party
1	Dhanaha	None	Yogendra Shrivastava	Praja Socialist Party
2	Bagaha	SC	Narsingh Baitha	Indian National Congress
3	Ram Nagar	None	Narayan Vikram Shah	Indian National Congress
4	Shikarpur	SC	B.Ram	Praja Socialist Party
5	Sikta	None	U. S. Shukla	Communist Party of India
6	Lauriya	None	Shatru Mardan Sahi	Independent
7	Chanapatia	None	Pramod Kumar Mishra	Indian National Congress
8	Bettiah	None	H.P. Shahi	Independent
9	Nautan	None	Kedar Pandey	Indian National Congress
10	Raxaul	None	Vidhyachal Sinha	Samyukta Socialist Party
11	Sugauli	None	M. L. Modi	Bharatiya Jana Sangh
12	Motihari	None	Chandrika Prasad Yadav	Bharatiya Jana Sangh
13	Adapur	None	Ahmed Karim	Independent
14	Ghorasahan	None	Ram Ayodhya Prasad	Praja Socialist Party
15	Dhaka	None	S.N. Sharma	Praja Socialist Party
16	Patahi	None	Ram Nandan Singh	Praja Socialist Party
17	Madhuban	None	Mahendra Bharti	Communist Party of India
18	Kesaria	None	Pitambar Singh	Communist Party of India
19	Pipra	SC	Bigu Ram	Indian National Congress
20	Harsidhi	None	S.M. Abdulla	Communist Party of India
21	Gobindganj	None	Dhrup Narain Mani Tripathi	Indian National Congress
22	Gopalganj	None	Hari Shankar Singh	Samyukta Socialist Party
23	Kuchaikot	None	Nagina Rai	Independent
24	Katea	SC	Badari Mahara	Indian National Congress
25	Bhore	None	Raj Mangal Mishra	Indian National Congress
26	Mirganj	None	Siya Bihari Sharan	Samyukta Socialist Party
27	Siwan	None	Raja Ram Chaudhry	Indian National Congress
28	Ziradei	None	Zawar Hussain	Indian National Congress
29	Mairwa	SC	Giridhari Ram	Communist Party of India
30	Darauli	None	Krishna Pratap Singh	Bharatiya Jana Sangh
31	Raghunathpur	None	Ramdev Sinha	Samyukta Socialist Party
32	Maharajganj	None	Kaushalendra Pratap Shahi	Praja Socialist Party
33	Barharia	None	Abdul Jalil	Communist Party of India
34	Gorlakothi	None	Krishna Kant Singh	Indian National Congress
35	Baikunthpur	None	Sabhapati Singh	Samyukta Socialist Party
36	Barauli	None	B. Rai	Independent
37	Manjhi	None	Ram Bahadur Singh	Samyukta Socialist Party
38	Baniapur	None	Uma Pandey	Indian National Congress
39	Masrakh	None	Prabhu Nath Singh	Indian National Congress
40	Taraiya	None	Dharam Nath Singh	Samyukta Socialist Party
41	Marhaura	None	Devi Laljee	Samyukta Socialist Party
42	Jalalpur	None	Jagdamba Prasad	Independent
43	Chapra	None	Uday Pratap N Singh	Bharatiya Jana Sangh
44	Garkha	SC	Vishwanath Bhagat	Independent
45	Parsa	None	Daroga Prasad Rai	Indian National Congress
46	Sonepur	None	Ram Jaipal Singh Yadav	Indian National Congress
47	Hajipur	None	Kishori Prasanna Sinha	Communist Party of India
48	Raghopur	None	Hariwansh Narayan Singh	Bharatiya Jana Sangh
49	Mahnar	None	Muneshwar Prasad Singh	Samyukta Socialist Party
50	Jandaha	None	Bhuvneshwar Chaudhary	Indian National Congress
51	Patepur	SC	Paltan Ram	Samyukta Socialist Party
52	Goraul	None	S. Patel	Indian National Congress
53	Vaishali	None	Laliteshwar Prasad Shahi	Indian National Congress
54	Lalganj	None	Dipnarain Singh	Indian National Congress
55	Paru	None	S.S. Singh	Samyukta Socialist Party
56	Sahebganj	None	Nawal Kishore Sinha	Indian National Congress
57	Baruraj	None	Sukhdeo Giri	Independent
58	Kanti	None	M.P. Sinha	Indian National Congress
59	Kurhani	None	Krishna Nandan Sahay	Indian National Congress
60	Sakra	SC	Newa Lal Mahto	Samyukta Socialist Party
61	Muzaffarpur	None	M.l. Gupta	Indian National Congress
62	Bochaha	SC	Sitaram Rajak	Samyukta Socialist Party
63	Gaighatti	None	Nitishwar Prasad Sinha	Indian National Congress
64	Aurai	None	C.M.P. Singh	Indian National Congress
65	Minapur	None	Mahanth Ramkishore Das	Samyukta Socialist Party
66	Runisaidpur	None	Viveka Nand Giri	Indian National Congress
67	Sitamarhi	None	Kishori Lal Sah	Indian National Congress
68	Bathnaha	None	Mohan Lal Sharma	Samyukta Socialist Party
69	Belsand	None	Chandreshwar Prasad Singh	Indian National Congress
70	Shedhar	None	Thakur Girija Nandan Singh	Independent
71	Majorganj	SC	R. Ram	Samyukta Socialist Party
72	Sonbarsa	None	R.N. Rai	Independent
73	Sursand	None	P. Devi	Indian National Congress
74	Pupri	None	N.h. Khan	Indian National Congress
75	Benipatt	None	T.N. Jha	Communist Party of India
76	Bisfi	None	R.K. Purbey	Communist Party of India
77	Harlakhi	None	Baidya Nath Yadav	Communist Party of India
78	Khajauli	None	N.S. Azad	Praja Socialist Party
79	Jainagar	SC	R. Paswan	Indian National Congress
80	Madhubani	None	S. Ansari	Indian National Congress
81	Jhanjharpur	None	H. Mishra	Indian National Congress
82	Rajnagar	SC	R. Mahto	Indian National Congress
83	Phulparas	None	D.l. Mandal	Sanghata Socialist Party
84	Laukaha	None	S. Sahu	Indian National Congress
85	Madhepur	None	B.P. Mahto	Sanghata Socialist Party
86	Biraul	None	M. Prasad	Sanghata Socialist Party
87	Baheri	None	B.N. Singh	Sanghata Socialist Party
88	Manigachi	None	N. Jha	Indian National Congress
89	Benipur	None	B.N. Jha	Indian National Congress
90	Darbhanga	None	R.P. Sinha	Indian National Congress
91	Keotiranway	None	H.N. Yadav	Sanghata Socialist Party
92	Jale	None	K. Hussain	Communist Party of India
93	Hayaghat	SC	B. Ram	Indian National Congress
94	Kalyanpur	None	B.N. Singh	Sanghata Socialist Party
95	Warisnagar	SC	R. Hazari	Sanghata Socialist Party
96	Samastipur	None	R.N. Sharma	Sanghata Socialist Party
97	Tajpur	None	Karpoori Thakur	Sanghata Socialist Party
98	Mohiuddin Nagar	None	P.l. Roy	Sanghata Socialist Party
99	Dalsinghsarai	None	Yashwant Kumar Choudhary	Swatantra Party
100	Sarairanjan	None	R. Mishra	Sanghata Socialist Party
101	Bibhutpur	None	P.S. Madan	Communist Party of India
102	Rosera	None	R.K. Jha	Sanghata Socialist Party
103	Hasanpur	None	G.P. Himanshu	Sanghata Socialist Party
104	Singhia	SC	S. Kumari	Indian National Congress
105	Raghopur	None	A. Goit	Sanghata Socialist Party
106	Kishanpur	None	B.P. Yadav	Sanghata Socialist Party
107	Supaul	None	U. Singh	Indian National Congress
108	Triveniganj	None	Anup Lal Yadav	Sanghata Socialist Party
109	Chhattapur	SC	K.l. Sardar	Sanghata Socialist Party
110	Kumarkhand	None	J. Singh	Sanghata Socialist Party
111	Simri Bakhitiarpur	None	C.M. Salahuddin	Indian National Congress
112	Mahishi	None	P. Kumar	Sanghata Socialist Party
113	Saharsa	None	R. Jha	Indian National Congress
114	Sonbarsa	SC	Y. Devi	Indian National Congress
115	Madhepura	None	M.P. Yadav	Sanghata Socialist Party
116	Murliganj	None	S.N. Jha	Praja Socialist Party
117	Alamnagar	None	V. Kavi	Indian National Congress
118	Rupauli	None	C.N. Sharma	Communist Party of India
119	Dhamdaha	None	L.N. Sudhansu	Indian National Congress
120	Banmankhi	SC	B. Saraf	Indian National Congress
121	Kasba	None	R. N. Mandal	Indian National Congress
122	Raniganj	SC	D.l. Baitha	Indian National Congress
123	Narpatganj	None	Satya Narayan Yadav	Indian National Congress
124	Forbesganj	None	S. Mishra	Indian National Congress
125	Araria	None	S.P. Gupta	Indian National Congress
126	Palasi	None	M.azimuddin	Independent
127	Bahadurganj	None	D.N. Jha	Praja Socialist Party
128	Thakurganj	None	M.H. Azad	Indian National Congress
129	Kishanganj	None	L.l. Kapoor	Praja Socialist Party
130	Jokihat	None	Nazamuddin	Praja Socialist Party
131	Amour	None	H. Rahman	Praja Socialist Party
132	Purnea	None	K.N. Sinha	Indian National Congress
133	Katihar	None	J. Adhikari	Bharatiya Jana Sangh
134	Barsoi	None	S.l. Jain	Independent
135	Azamnagar	None	A. Zafar	Indian National Congress
136	Korha	SC	B.P. Shastri	Indian National Congress
137	Barari	None	B.P. Singh	Indian National Congress
138	Manihari	None	Yuvraj	Praja Socialist Party
139	Rajmahal	None	N. Dokanie	Swatantra Party
140	Borio	ST	J. Kisku	Swatantra Party
141	Barhait	None	M. Soren	Independent
142	Litipara	ST	B. Murmu	Independent
143	Pakur	None	B.n. Jha	Bharatiya Jana Sangh
144	Maheshpur	ST	P. Hasdak	Independent
145	Shikaripara	ST	B. Hembrom	Indian National Congress
146	Nala	None	B. Khan	Communist Party of India
147	Jamtara	None	S. Besra	Communist Party of India
148	Sarath	None	N.K. Singh	Indian National Congress
149	Madhupur	None	A.K. Banerjee	Bharatiya Jana Sangh
150	Deoghar	SC	B. Das	Bharatiya Jana Sangh
151	Jarmundi	None	S. Raut	Independent
152	Dumka	ST	G. Marandi	Bharatiya Jana Sangh
153	Jama	ST	M. Hasda	Independent
154	Poraiyahat	ST	M. Murmu	Bharatiya Jana Sangh
155	Godda	None	D.N. Choudhary	Indian National Congress
156	Mahagama	None	R. Ram	Indian National Congress
157	Pirpainti	None	A. Prasad	Communist Party of India
158	Colgong	None	N.P. Singh	Communist Party of India
159	Nathnagar	None	K. Jha	Indian National Congress
160	Bhagalpur	None	B.K. Mitra	Bharatiya Jana Sangh
161	Gopalpur	None	M. Singh	Communist Party of India
162	Bihpur	None	Gyaneshwar Prasad Yadav	Bharatiya Jana Sangh
163	Sultanganj	None	B.P. Sharma	Praja Socialist Party
164	Amarpur	None	S.N. Singh	Sanghata Socialist Party
165	Dhoraiya	SC	S. Mandal	Indian National Congress
166	Banka	None	B.l. Mandal	Bharatiya Jana Sangh
167	Belhar	None	C.P. Singh	Sanghata Socialist Party
168	Kotoria	None	K. Sitaram	Bharatiya Jana Sangh
169	Chakai	None	S. Singh	Sanghata Socialist Party
170	Jhajha	None	S. Jha	Sanghata Socialist Party
171	Jamui	None	T.P. Singh	Praja Socialist Party
172	Sikandra	SC	S. Vivekanand	Sanghata Socialist Party
173	Sheikhpura	SC	L. Mochi	Communist Party of India
174	Barbigha	None	S.S. Sinha	Indian National Congress
175	Barahiya	None	K. Singh	Sanghata Socialist Party
176	Surajgarha	None	B.P. Mehta	Praja Socialist Party
177	Jamalpur	None	B. P. Yadav	Sanghata Socialist Party
178	Tarapur	None	B. N. Parsant	Sanghata Socialist Party
179	Kharagpur	None	S. J. B. Singh	Sanghata Socialist Party
180	Monghyr	None	Hasim	Sanghata Socialist Party
181	Parbatta	None	S.P. Singh	Sanghata Socialist Party
182	Choutham	None	J. Mandal	Sanghata Socialist Party
183	Alduli	SC	M. Sada	Indian National Congress
184	Khagaria	None	R. B. Azad	Sanghata Socialist Party
185	Ballia	None	A. Misra	Sanghata Socialist Party
186	Begusarai	None	B. Singh	Independent
187	Bakhri	SC	Y. K. Sharma	Communist Party of India
188	Bariarpur	None	R. Singh	Sanghata Socialist Party
189	Barauni	None	C. Singh	Communist Party of India
190	Bachhwara	None	V. P. Singh	Sanghata Socialist Party
191	Mokamah	None	B. Lal	Republican Party of India
192	Barh	None	T. P. Singh	Jan Kranti Dal
193	Bakhtiarpur	None	D. Singh	Indian National Congress
194	Fatwa	SC	R. C. Prasad	Bharatiya Jana Sangh
195	Bihar	None	V. K. Yadav	Communist Party of India
196	Asthawan	None	B. P. Jawahar	Indian National Congress
197	Ekangar Sarai	None	L. S. Tyagi	Indian National Congress
198	Rajgir	SC	J. Prasad	Bharatiya Jana Sangh
199	Islampur	None	S. S. Prasad	Indian National Congress
200	Chandi	None	R. P. Singh	Indian National Congress
201	Hilsa	None	A. K. Singh	Indian National Congress
202	Masaurhi	None	B. Sharma	Communist Party of India
203	Punpun	SC	M. Paswan	Jan Kranti Dal
204	Patna South	None	Ram Lakhan Singh Yadav	Indian National Congress
205	Patna East	None	R D. Mahto	Bharatiya Jana Sangh
206	Patna West	None	M. P. Sinha	Jan Kranti Dal
207	Danapur	None	R. S. Singh	Sanghata Socialist Party
208	Maner	None	R. N. Singh	Independent
209	Bikram	None	Mahabir Gop	Indian National Congress
210	Paliganj	None	C. P. Varma	Sanghata Socialist Party
211	Sandesh	None	R. S. Singh	Sanghata Socialist Party
212	Arrah	None	S. Devi	Indian National Congress
213	Barhara	None	A. S. Singh	Indian National Congress
214	Shahpur	None	R. N. Tiwari	Sanghata Socialist Party
215	Brahampur	None	S. Sharma	Independent
216	Dumraon	None	H. P. Singh	Independent
217	Nawanagar	SC	L. B. Prasad	Communist Party of India
218	Buxar	None	P. Chatterjee	Sanghata Socialist Party
219	Ramgarh	None	S. Singh	Sanghata Socialist Party
220	Mohania	SC	R. Ram	Indian National Congress
221	Chainpur	None	M. C. Singh	Indian National Congress
222	Bhabua	None	S. N. Pandey	Indian National Congress
223	Chenari	SC	C. Ram	Indian National Congress
224	Sasaram	None	B.B. Singh	Indian National Congress
225	Dehri	None	A. Q. Ansari	Indian National Congress
226	Karakat	None	T. Singh	Sanghata Socialist Party
227	Nokha	None	G. Singh	Indian National Congress
228	Dinara	None	R. A. Singh	Sanghata Socialist Party
229	Bikramganj	None	K. Singh	Indian National Congress
230	Jagdishpur	None	S. P. Rai	Indian National Congress
231	Piro	None	R. M. Rai	Sanghata Socialist Party
232	Sahar	SC	B. Chamar	Indian National Congress
233	Arwal	None	S. Zohair	Communist Party of India
234	Kurtha	None	J. Prasad	Sanghata Socialist Party
235	Makhdumpur	SC	L. Ram	Sanghata Socialist Party
236	Jehanabad	None	S. F. Hussain	Indian National Congress
237	Ghosi	None	R. P. Sinha	Communist Party of India
238	Belaganj	None	S. N. Sinha	Sanghata Socialist Party
239	Goh	None	T. M. Singh	Indian National Congress
240	Daudnagar	None	R. N. Singh	Praja Socialist Party
241	Obra	None	R. K. Singh	Indian National Congress
242	Nabinagar	None	S. N. Singh	Indian National Congress
243	Aurangabad	None	S. Singh	Praja Socialist Party
244	Rafiganj	SC	D. Ram	Indian National Congress
245	Imamganj	SC	D. Ram	Indian National Congress
246	Sherghati	None	M. A. Khan	Jan Kranti Dal
247	Barachatti	SC	V. C. Bharti	Indian National Congress
248	Bodh Gaya	SC	R. Manjhi	Indian National Congress
249	Konch	None	U. N. Verma	Sanghata Socialist Party
250	Gaya	None	G. Mishra	Bharatiya Jana Sangh
251	Gaya Muffasil	None	R. C. Yadav	Sanghata Socialist Party
252	Atri	None	K. Prasad	Independent
253	Hisua	None	S. S. Singh	Indian National Congress
254	Nawada	None	R. S. P. Yadav	Indian National Congress
255	Rajauli	SC	S. Devi	Indian National Congress
256	Warisaliganj	None	D. Prasad	Communist Party of India
257	Govindpur	None	A. Prasad	Indian National Congress
258	Kodarma	None	B. Modi	Sanghata Socialist Party
259	Dhanwar	None	P. Rai	Indian National Congress
260	Gawan	SC	G. Rabidas	Indian National Congress
261	Jamua	None	S. Prasad	Indian National Congress
262	Giridih	None	R. Ram	Indian National Congress
263	Dumri	None	S. Manjari	Independent
264	Bermo	None	B. Dubey	Indian National Congress
265	Bagodar	None	L. R. Lakshmi	Jan Kranti Dal
266	Barhi	None	I. J. N. Singh	Jan Kranti Dal
267	Hazaribagh	None	R. Prasad	Jan Kranti Dal
268	Chauparan	None	N. P. Singh	Independent
269	Chatra	None	K. P. Singh	Independent
270	Barkagaon	SC	M. Ram	Bharatiya Jana Sangh
271	Ramgarh	None	T. P. Buxi	Jan Kranti Dal
272	Mandu	None	B. N. Singh	Jan Kranti Dal
273	Jaridih	None	S. Manjari	Independent
274	Chandankiyari	SC	S. B. Bouri	Independent
275	Topchanchi	None	P. N. Singh	Independent
276	Baghmara	None	M. M. Singh	Jan Kranti Dal
277	Dhanbad	None	R. Singh	Indian National Congress
278	Tundi	None	G. Mishra	Jan Kranti Dal
279	Nirsa	None	R. N. Sharma	Indian National Congress
280	Sindri	None	A. K. Roy	Communist Party of India
281	Jharia	None	S. R. Prasad	Indian National Congress
282	Baharagora	None	S. R. Khan	Independent
283	Ghatsila	ST	D. Murmu	Indian National Congress
284	Patamda	None	G. Mahato	Indian National Congress
285	Jamshedpur East	None	M. J. Akhauri	Indian National Congress
286	Jamshedpur West	None	C. Vyas	Indian National Congress
287	Jugsalai	ST	M. R. Tudu	Indian National Congress
288	Saraikella	None	R.P. Sarangi	Bharatiya Jana Sangh
289	Chaibasa	ST	B. Sumbrui	Independent
290	Majhgaon	ST	P. C. Birua	Independent
291	Manoharpur	ST	R. Nayak	Sanghata Socialist Party
292	Jagannathpur	ST	V. Pareya	Indian National Congress
293	Chakardharpur	ST	M. Majhi	Bharatiya Jana Sangh
294	Ichagarh	None	P. K. A. Deo	Indian National Congress
295	Kharsawan	ST	D. Matisay	Bharatiya Jana Sangh
296	Tamar	ST	B. R. Munda	Indian National Congress
297	Torpa	ST	S. Pahan	Indian National Congress
298	Khunti	ST	T. M. Munda	Indian National Congress
299	Silli	SC	B. Swansi	Jan Kranti Dal
300	Khijri	ST	R. L. Horo	Indian National Congress
301	Ranchi	None	N. G. Mitra	Bharatiya Jana Sangh
302	Kanke	None	J. N. Choubey	Jan Kranti Dal
303	Kolebira	ST	N. E. Horo	Independent
304	Simdega	ST	P. Toppo	Independent
305	Chainpur	ST	S. Tigga	Indian National Congress
306	Gumla	ST	R. Oraon	Bharatiya Jana Sangh
307	Sisai	ST	S. Bhagat	Indian National Congress
308	Bero	ST	K.C. Bhagat	Indian National Congress
309	Mandar	ST	S. Bhagat	Indian National Congress
310	Lohardaga	ST	B. Lakna	Indian National Congress
311	Latehar	ST	T. Singh	Indian National Congress
312	Panki	SC	R. Ram	Bharatiya Jana Sangh
313	Daltonganj	None	P. Chand	Sanghata Socialist Party
314	Garhwa	None	L. Prasad	Indian National Congress
315	Bhawanathpur	None	S. P. Deo	Indian National Congress
316	Leslieganj	None	J. Pathak	Indian National Congress
317	Bishrampur	SC	R. D. Ram	Indian National Congress
318	Hussainbad	None	B. N. Singh	Indian National Congress

== See also ==
- List of constituencies of the Bihar Legislative Assembly
- 1967 elections in India
