= Prabhunath Singh =

Indian criminal and politician

Member of Parliament, Lok Sabha
- In office 2013–2014
- Preceded by: Uma Shankar Singh
- Succeeded by: Janardan Singh Sigriwal
- In office 1998–2009
- Preceded by: Ram Bahadur Singh
- Succeeded by: Uma Shankar Singh
- Constituency: Maharajganj

Member (MLA) in Bihar Legislative Assembly
- In office 1985–1995
- Preceded by: Ram Deo Singh
- Succeeded by: Ashok Singh
- Constituency: Masrakh

Personal details
- Born: 20 November 1953 (age 72) Mashrakh, Saran district, Bihar
- Party: Janta Dal United
- Spouse: Binda Devi
- Children: 4 (2 sons and 2 daughters)
- Parents: Basudev Singh (father); Mahasundry Devi (mother)

Prabhunath Singh is a politician from Bihar, India and was a member of the 12th, 13th and 14th Lok Sabha. Singh represented the Masrakh assembly constituency from 1985 to 1995, and the Maharajganj Lok Sabha constituency of Bihar from 1998 to 2009. In 2013, he won the bypoll and remained as MP until 2014. Singh is a member of the JDU and currently serving life imprisonment in murder case.

== Early life and education ==
Singh was born in Mashrakh, Saran district, Bihar. He studied until class-12 from Bihar University, Muzaffarpur in 1972. His brothers Dina Singh, Madan Singh and Kedar Singh are also politicians.

== Family ==
He is married to Binda Devi. His son, Randhir Kumar Singh, is also a politician Currently MLA from Manjhi Assembly constituency and lost in the 2019 Indian general election to Janardan Singh Sigriwal of the Bharatiya Janata Party (BJP).

== Career ==
Before entering into politics, Singh owned a brick-making factory. He won his first election for MLA as an independent candidate due to his support among Rajputs from his area. He is a four time member of parliament from the Saran district. In the 1995 elections, he ran as a member of BJP, but left for the Janata Dal (United) (JD(U)) party after losing. Singh won election as a member of the JD(U) party, but later joined RJD due to dictatorship of Nitish Kumar in JD(U). He represented the Maharajganj constituency of Bihar from 2004 to 2009 on the JD(U) ticket. In 2009, he contested on the JD(U) ticket, but narrowly lost to Uma Shankar Singh of RJD. After the death of Uma Shankar Singh, whose seat was now vacant, Singh contested on the RJD ticket, defeating JD(U)'s nominee P.K. Shahi.

== Conviction and controversies ==
On 23 May 2017, Singh was sentenced to life imprisonment by the Hazaribagh Court for his connection with the murder of MLA Ashok Singh 22 years prior.

== Positions held ==
Prabhunath Singh had been elected as MLA twice, and as Lok Sabha MP four times.

#	From	To	Position	Party
1.	1985	1990	MLA (1st term) from Masrakh	IND
2.	1990	1995	MLA (2nd term) from Masrakh	Janata Dal
3.	1998	1999	MP (1st term) in 12th Lok Sabha from Maharajganj	Samata Party (Uday Mandal is current President)
4.	1999	2004	MP (2nd term) in 13th Lok Sabha from Maharajganj	JD(U)
5.	2004	2009	MP (3rd term) in 14th Lok Sabha from Maharajganj	JD(U)
6.	2013	2014	MP (4th term) in 15th Lok Sabha from Maharajganj (by-poll)	RJD
