= Manjhi Assembly constituency =

Coordinates: 25°50′23″N 84°34′55″E

Manjhi
- Constituency No. 114 for the Bihar Legislative Assembly

Constituency details
- Country: India
- Region: East India
- State: Bihar
- District: Saran
- Established: 1951
- Total electors: 294,611

Member of Legislative Assembly
- 18th Bihar Legislative Assembly
- Incumbent Randhir Singh
- Party: JD(U)
- Alliance: NDA
- Elected year: 2025

Manjhi Assembly constituency is an assembly constituency in Saran district in the Indian state of Bihar.

== Overview ==
As per the Delimitation of Parliamentary and Assembly constituencies Order, 2008, No. 114 Manjhi Assembly constituency is composed of the following: Jalalpur Community Development Block; Sarbisarya, Sitalpur, Tajpur, Adarsh Gram Bareja, Madan Sath, Ghorhat, Dumari, Jaitpur, Inayatpur, Nasira, Baleshra, Daudpur, Lejuar, Bangara, Sonbarsa, Marhan, Manjhi Purbi, Manjhi Pashchimi and Kouru-Dhouru Gram Panchayats of Manjhi CD Block; Karhi, Manikpura and Lauwa Kala gram panchayats of Baniapur CD Block.

Manjhi Assembly constituency is a part of No. 19 Maharajganj (Lok Sabha constituency).

== Members of the Legislative Assembly ==
Year	Name	Party
1952	Girish Tiwari	Indian National Congress
1957	Girish Tiwari	Indian National Congress
1962	Girish Tiwari	Indian National Congress
1967	Ram Bahadur Singh	Samyukta Socialist Party
1969	Rameshwar Dut Sharma	Indian National Congress
1972	Ram Bahadur Singh	Samyukta Socialist Party
1977	Ram Bahadur Singh	Janata Party
1980	Rameshwar Dut Sharma	Indian National Congress
1985	Budhan Prasad Yadav	Independent politician
1990	Hazari Singh	Janata Dal
1995	Budhan Prasad Yadav	Indian National Congress
2000	Ravindra Nath Mishra	Independent politician
2005	Gautam Singh	Janata Dal (United)
2005	Gautam Singh	Janata Dal (United)
2010	Gautam Singh	Janata Dal (United)
2015	Vijay Shanker Dubey	Indian National Congress
2020	Satyendra Yadav	Communist Party of India (Marxist)
2025	Randhir Singh	Janata Dal (United)

== Election results ==
=== 2025 ===
2025 Bihar Legislative Assembly election: Manjhi
Party	Candidate	Votes	%	±%
JD(U)	Randhir Singh	68,455	38.53	+20.07
CPI(M)	Dr. Satyendra Yadav	58,668	33.02	−4.54
Independent	Rana Pratap Singh	19,139	10.77	−10.72
JSP	Y. V. Giri	9,306	5.24	
ASP(KR)	Nasim Ahmad	3,400	1.91	
Independent	Sanju Yadav	3,107	1.75	
Independent	Om Prakash Prasad	3,087	1.74	
BSP	Santosh Prasad	2,012	1.13	
NOTA	None of the above	6,113	3.44	+2.87
Majority		9,787	5.51	−10.56
Turnout		177,676	60.31	+8.1
JD(U) gain from CPI(M)		Swing		

=== 2020 ===
2020 Bihar Legislative Assembly election: Manjhi
Party	Candidate	Votes	%	±%
CPI(M)	Satyendra Yadav	59,324	37.56	+25.17
Independent	Rana Pratap Singh	33,938	21.49	+11.52
JD(U)	Madhavi Kumari	29,155	18.46	
RLSP	Om Prakash Prasad	10,109	6.4	
Independent	Vijay Pratap Singh	7,374	4.67	
LJP	Saurabh Kumar Pandey	3,725	2.36	−12.04
Independent	Saurabh Sunny	2,469	1.56	
Independent	Shankar Sharma	2,345	1.48	
Rashtriya Jan Jan Party	Ravi Ranjan Singh	1,672	1.06	
Independent	Ram Narayan Yadav	1,561	0.99	−0.89
NOTA	None of the above	906	0.57	−1.82
Majority		25,386	16.07	+9.9
Turnout		157,930	52.21	+1.51
CPI(M) gain from INC		Swing		

=== 2015 ===
2015 Bihar Legislative Assembly election: Manjhi
Party	Candidate	Votes	%	±%
INC	Vijay Shanker Dubey	29,558	20.57	
LJP	Keshav Singh	20,692	14.4	
CPI(M)	Dr. Satyendra Yadav	17,803	12.39	
Independent	Rana Pratap Singh	14,322	9.97	
SP	Gautam Singh	13,449	9.36	
Independent	Om Prakash Prasad	12,947	9.01	
Independent	Rabindra Nath Mishra	9,713	6.76	
Independent	Rai Bahadur Singh	5,938	4.13	
Independent	Hem Narayan Singh	5,363	3.73	
BSP	Rajesh Tyagi	2,787	1.94	
Independent	Ram Narayan Yadav	2,695	1.88	
SS	Santosh Prasad	1,591	1.11	
Independent	Keshawanand Giri	1,401	0.97	
Garib Janta Dal (Secular)	Dhruv Dev Gupta	1,349	0.94	
NOTA	None of the above	3,431	2.39	
Majority		8,866	6.17	
Turnout		143,720	50.7	
Bharatiya New Sanskar Krantikari Party	Ravikant Chaurasiya	681	0.47	
INC gain from JD(U)		Swing		

=== 2010 ===
2010 Bihar Legislative Assembly election: Manjhi
Party	Candidate	Votes	%	±%
JD(U)	Gautam Singh	28,687	26.88	
RJD	Hem Narayan Singh	20,783	19.47	
Independent	Rabindra Nath Mishra	8,423	7.89	
Independent	Om Prakash Prasad	7,012	6.57	
INC	Budhan Prasad Yadav	6,640	6.22	
CPI(M)	Dr. Satyendra Yadav	5,441	5.10	
Independent	Jitendra Kumar Singh	4,884	4.58	
BSP	Surendra Prasad Gupta	4,030	3.78	
Independent	Manoj Kumar Tiwary	3,385	3.17	
Independent	Rana Pratap Singh	2,189	2.05	
Independent	Dalan Prasad Yadav	2,168	2.03	
Independent	Ghanshyam Singh (Alias Pappu Singh)	1,827	1.71	
NCP	Krishna Mishra	1,651	1.55	
Independent	Din Dayal Singh	1,507	1.41	
Independent	Mustafa Khan	1,501	1.41	
Independent	Subash Singh	1,211	1.13	
Independent	Hasmuddin Khan	1,067	1.00	
Independent	Ashok Kumar Singh	992	0.93	
SP	Sujit Puri	804	0.75	
Independent	Ramnarayan Yadav	778	0.73	
Independent	Mukesh Kumar	721	0.68	
Independent	Rinku Devi	527	0.49	
Independent	Abdul Kadir Khan	493	0.46	
Majority		7,904	7.39	
Turnout		106,721	49.35	
JD(U) hold		Swing		

=== 2005 ===
February 2005 Bihar Legislative Assembly election: Manjhi
Party	Candidate	Votes	%	±%
JD(U)	Gautam Singh	26,349	29.7	
INC	Rabindra Nath Mishra	21,192	23.9	
Independent	Budhan Prasad Yadav	15,619	17.6	
Independent	Malti Singh	5,985	6.8	
Samajwadi Janata Party (R)	Om Prakash	3,367	3.8	
Independent	Sudama Tiwari	2,408	2.7	
Independent	Sanjay Kumar	2,354	2.6	
BSP	Shobha Ram	1,943	2.2	
Independent	Suday Ram	1,809	2.0	
Independent	Haresh Yadaw	1,292	1.5	
Independent	Usha Mishra	1,266	1.4	
Samata Party	Sharda Nand	1,005	1.1	
AD(K)	Suryamukhi Devi	967	1.1	
Independent	Parmod Kumar	897	1.0	
Independent	Kaushalendra Singh	746	0.8	
Independent	Vidyashankar Singh	564	0.6	
Independent	Manoj Kumar	461	0.5	
Independent	Lal Babu	442	0.5	
Majority		5,157	5.8	
Turnout		88,666		
JD(U) gain from Independent		Swing		

=== 2000 ===
2000 Bihar Legislative Assembly election: Manjhi
Party	Candidate	Votes	%	±%
Independent	Ravindra Nath Mishra	33,725	31.33	
Samata Party	Gautam Singh	27,583	25.62	
INC	Budhan Prasad Yadav	21,065	19.57	
Samajwadi Janata Party (R)	Rambahadur Singh	14,711	13.67	
Shivsena	Saket Kr Singh	4,052	3.76	
Independent	Haresh Yadav	2,263	2.1	
BSP	Sanjay Kumar Singh	1,361	1.26	
Independent	Shivakant Singh	758	0.7	
CPI(ML)(L)	Rampukar Sah	447	0.42	
Independent	Usha Mishra	446	0.41	
Independent	Jeeut Yadav	423	0.39	
Independent	Arjun Singh	368	0.34	
AD(K)	Manoj Kumar Puri	250	0.23	
Independent	Thakur Mahto	202	0.19	
Majority		6,132	5.68	
Turnout		107,654	65.55	
Independent gain from INC		Swing		

=== 1995 ===
1995 Bihar Legislative Assembly election: Manjhi
Party	Candidate	Votes	%	±%
INC	Budhan Prasad Yadav	34,130	34.41	
Samajwadi Janata Party (R)	Ram Bahadur Singh	17,016	17.16	
Samata Party	Rabinder Mishra	15,026	15.15	
JD	Hazari Singh	12,410	12.51	
Bhartiya Pragatisheel Party	Gautam Singh	8,005	8.07	
BJP	Brajesh Kumar Raman	5,493	5.54	
Independent	Sanjay Kumar Singh	2,359	2.38	
Independent	Kanti Devi	1,121	1.13	
Independent	Gautam Singh	640	0.65	
Doordarshi Party	Upender Kumar Mahto	613	0.62	
Independent	Ramdahin Ram	468	0.47	
Independent	Kuwar Mahto	397	0.4	
Independent	Subhash Manjhi	314	0.32	
Independent	Swaminath Dubey	267	0.27	
Independent	Birender Singh	252	0.25	
Independent	Bharat Pandey	234	0.24	
Independent	Hasnuddin Khan	207	0.21	
Independent	Shivakant Singh	166	0.17	
Independent	Akhileshwar Singh	62	0.06	
Majority		17,114	17.25	
Turnout		99,180	64.59	
INC gain from JD		Swing		

=== 1990 ===
1990 Bihar Legislative Assembly election: Manjhi
Party	Candidate	Votes	%	±%
JD	Hazari Singh	50,365	48.04	
INC	Budhan Prasad Yadav	34,117	32.54	
Independent	Ravindra Nath Mishra	1,022	9.75	
BJP	Sudama Tiwari	332	3.17	
BSP	Subas Manjhi	158	1.51	
Independent	Raghu Pati Mahto	124	1.18	
Lok Dal (B)	Munshi Prasad	87	0.83	
Independent	Sai Khurshid Nayar	70	0.67	
Independent	Kanhaiya Bharti	43	0.41	
Janata Party (JP)	Ram Nath Singh	40	0.38	
Independent	Nirmal Bharti	37	0.35	
Independent	Kedar Nath Sah	34	0.33	
Independent	Ram Krishna Giri	13	0.13	
Independent	Kamal Das	12	0.12	
Independent	Om Prakash Tiwari	12	0.12	
Independent	Raju Singh	9	0.09	
Independent	Iswar Nath Pandey	8	0.08	
Independent	Kameshwar Sah	7	0.07	
Independent	Badari Pd Gor	6	0.06	
Independent	Akileshwar Singh	5	0.05	
Independent	Swami Nath Dube	4	0.04	
Independent	Shiva Kant Singh	3	0.03	
Majority		16,248	15.5	
Turnout		104,832	60.05	
JD gain from Independent		Swing		

=== 1985 ===
1985 Bihar Legislative Assembly election: Manjhi
Party	Candidate	Votes	%	±%
Independent	Budhan Prasad Yadav	20,583	29.37	
JP	Hajari Singh	14,152	20.2	
INC	Rameshwar Dutt Sharma	11,818	16.87	
BJP	Dindayal Singh	6,475	9.24	
Independent	Ramnath Singh	4,797	6.85	
Independent	Sabhapati Pandey	3,561	5.08	
IC(S)	Chandeswar Singh	3,031	4.33	
Independent	Jagat Kishore Giri	1,490	2.13	
Independent	Badri Gond	1,218	1.74	
Independent	Jai Prakash Singh	602	0.86	
Independent	Munshi Prasad	504	0.72	
Independent	Akhileshwar Singh	335	0.48	
Independent	Chandra Shekhar Yadav	312	0.45	
Independent	Om Prakash Tiwari	278	0.4	
Independent	Shankar Pathak	263	0.38	
Independent	Virendra Singh	232	0.33	
Independent	Tribhuwan Rai	209	0.3	
Independent	Surendra Kumar Rawat	124	0.18	
Independent	Raghuvir Bharti	90	0.13	
Majority		6,420	9.17	
Turnout		70,074	53.17	
Independent gain from INC		Swing		

=== 1980 ===
1980 Bihar Legislative Assembly election: Manjhi
Party	Candidate	Votes	%	±%
INC	Rameshwar Dutta Sharma	33,448	48.04	
Janata Party (JP)	Ram Bahadur Singh	32,956	47.34	
Independent	Ramayan Singh	1,210	1.74	
Independent	Hiraban	711	1.02	
Independent	Sukshma Tiwary	655	0.94	
Independent	Kedar Nath Gupta	641	0.92	
Majority		492	0.70	
Turnout		69,621	55.92	
INC gain from JP		Swing		

=== 1977 ===
1977 Bihar Legislative Assembly election: Manjhi
Party	Candidate	Votes	%	±%
JP	Ram Bahadur Singh	51,897	73.77	
INC	Rameshwar Dutta Sharma	18,452	26.23	
Majority		33,445	47.54	
Turnout		70,349	63.44	
JP gain from SSP		Swing		

=== 1972 ===
1972 Bihar Legislative Assembly election: Manjhi
Party	Candidate	Votes	%	±%
SSP	Ram Bahadur Singh	25,781	40.12	
INC	Budhan Prasad Yadav	23,042	35.86	
INC(O)	Rameshwar Dutta Sharma	14,635	22.78	
ABJS	Birendra Singh	800	1.24	
Majority		3,739	4.26	
Turnout		64,258	61.44	

=== 1952 ===
In the 1969 Bihar Legislative Assembly election, Rameshwar Dut Sharma of the Indian National Congress won the Manjhi constituency. In the 1967 Bihar Legislative Assembly election, Ram Bahadur Singh of Samyukta Socialist Party won the Manjhi assembly seat. In the 1962, 1957, 1952 Bihar Vidhan Sabha elections, Girish Tiwary of the Indian National Congress (INC) won the Manjhi assembly seat.
