= Uphara Gram Panchayat =

Coordinates: 25.08820°N 84.69633°E

- Village Panchayat
- In Aurangabad, Bihar, India
- Country: India
- State: Bihar
- Division: Magadh
- District: Aurangabad
- Block: Goh
- LGD code: 93937

Government
  - Type: Gram Panchayat
  - Body: Nagar Parishad Daudnagar
  - Mukhiya: Chandra Bhushan Kumar
  - Secretary: Sanjeet Kumar Mishra
  - M.P.: Raja Ram Singh Kushwaha (Karakat Lok Sabha constituency)
  - MLA: Amrendra Kushwaha (Goh Assembly constituency)
- Elevation: 102 m (335 ft)

Population ((As on Date))
  - Total: 9,593

Languages
  - Official: Hindi
  - Common: Magahi
- Time zone: UTC+5:30 (IST)
- PIN Code: 824203
- ISO 3166 code: IN-BR
- Vehicle registration: BR 26
- Sex ratio: 1000:927 ♂/♀
- Website: https://aurangabad.bih.nic.in
- Nearest major highway- SH 68; Village code 252937 (Census of India)

Uphara Gram Panchayat is a local self-government body located in the Goh Block of Aurangabad district in the Indian state of Bihar. It serves as an administrative unit for a cluster of villages and plays a key role in implementing development schemes, providing public services, and managing local infrastructure. The gram panchayat is mapped with nine villages, including Upahra, Baijalpur, Pathak Bigaha, Baso Bigaha, Shekhpura, Khaira, Aranda, Belaru, and Lodipur.

== See also ==
- Panchayati raj in India
- Aurangabad district, Bihar
- Uphara
- Arwal
