= Maharajganj, Bihar Lok Sabha constituency =

Lok Sabha constituency in Bihar, India

Coordinates: 26.1°N 84.5°E

Maharajganj
- Lok Sabha constituency

Constituency details
- Country: India
- Region: East India
- State: Bihar
- Established: 1957
- Total electors: 19,34,937 (2024)
- Reservation: None

Member of Parliament
- 18th Lok Sabha
- Incumbent Janardan Singh Sigriwal
- Party: BJP
- Alliance: NDA
- Elected year: 2024
- Preceded by: RJD

Maharajganj is one of the 40 Lok Sabha parliamentary constituencies in Bihar state in eastern India. There is a constituency by the same name in Uttar Pradesh as well.

== Assembly segments ==
Presently, Maharajganj Lok Sabha constituency comprises the following six Vidhan Sabha (legislative assembly) segments.

#	Name	District	Member	Party	2024 lead
111	Goriakhoti	Siwan	Devesh Kant Singh	BJP	BJP
112	Maharajganj	Siwan	Hemnarayan Sah	JD(U)	BJP
113	Ekma	Saran	Manoranjan Singh	JD(U)	BJP
114	Manjhi	Saran	Randhir Kumar Singh	JD(U)	BJP
115	Baniapur	Saran	Kedar Nath Singh	BJP	BJP
116	Taraiya	Saran	Janak Singh	BJP	BJP

== Members of Parliament ==
Year	Name	Party
1957	Mahendra Nath Singh	Indian National Congress
1962	Krishnakanta Singh	Indian National Congress
1967	Mrityunjay Prasad	Indian National Congress
1971	Ram Deo Singh	Samyukta Socialist Party
1977	Ram Deo Singh	Janata Party
1980	Krishan Pratap Singh	Indian National Congress (I)
1984	Krishan Pratap Singh	Indian National Congress
1989	Chandra Shekhar	Janata Dal
1989^	Ram Bahadur Singh	Janata Dal
1991	Girija Devi	Janata Dal
1996	Ram Bahadur Singh	Samajwadi Janata Party
1998	Prabhunath Singh	Samata Party
1999	Prabhunath Singh	Janata Dal (United)
2004	Prabhunath Singh	Janata Dal (United)
2009	Uma Shankar Singh	Rashtriya Janata Dal
2013^	Prabhunath Singh	Rashtriya Janata Dal
2014	Janardan Singh Sigriwal	Bharatiya Janata Party
2019	Janardan Singh Sigriwal	Bharatiya Janata Party
2024	Janardan Singh Sigriwal	Bharatiya Janata Party

^ by poll

== Elections results ==
=== 2024 ===
2024 Indian general elections: Maharajganj
Party	Candidate	Votes	%	±%
BJP	Janardan Singh Sigriwal	529,533	52.22	
INC	Akash Prasad Singh	4,26,882	42.09	
NOTA	None of the above	21,687	2.14	
BSP	Madhusudan Singh	13,402	1.32	
AIMIM	Akhileshwar Prasad Singh	7,767	0.77	
Majority		1,02,651	10.13	
Turnout		10,15,313	52.27	
BJP hold		Swing		

=== 2019 ===
2019 Indian general elections: Maharajganj
Party	Candidate	Votes	%	±%
BJP	Janardan Singh Sigriwal	546,352	56.17	
RJD	Randhir Singh	3,15,580	32.44	
BSP	Sadhu Yadav	25,039	2.57	
NOTA	None of the above	22,168	2.28	
Majority		2,30,772	23.73	
Turnout		9,72,989	53.82	+2.26
BJP hold		Swing		

=== General Election 2014 ===
General Election, 2014: Maharajganj
Party	Candidate	Votes	%	±%
BJP	Janardan Singh Sigriwal	320,753	37.88	+37.88
RJD	Prabhunath Singh	2,82,338	33.34	−21.09
JD(U)	Manoranjan Singh	1,49,483	17.65	−17.21
IND.	Brinda Pathak	17,186	2.03	+2.03
IND.	Umashankar Tiwari	11,599	1.37	+1.37
NOTA	None of the Above	23,404	2.76	+2.76
Majority		38,415	4.54	−15.03
Turnout		8,46,654	51.56	+4.81
BJP gain from RJD		Swing	-16.55	

=== By Election 2013 ===
Bye-election, 2013: Maharajganj
Party	Candidate	Votes	%	±%
RJD	Prabhunath Singh	233.452	50.20	
JD(U)	Prashant Kumar Shahi	1,56,890	33.60	
INC	Jitendra Swami	33,905	7.50	
IND.	Vikash Kumar Singh	17,046	3.70	
BED	Balendra Kumar Ray	13,064	2.95	
IND.	Om Prakash Singh	10,995	2.20	
Majority		76562	26.5	
Turnout		465352	31.05	
RJD gain from JD(U)		Swing		

== See also ==
- Saran district
- List of constituencies of the Lok Sabha
