= Randhir =

Randhir is a common Indian male name. It may refer to:

== Entertainment ==
- Randhir (actor), Indian character actor in Hindi and Punjabi films from the 1940s to the 1980s
- Randhir Kapoor (born 1947), Indian actor
- Randhir Gattla, an Indian film actor working in Telugu cinema
- Randhir, fictional villain in the 1980 Indian film The Burning Train, portrayed by Danny Denzongpa

== Politics ==
- Randhir Singh of Bharatpur (died 1823), Indian ruler of princely state Bharatpur
- Randhir Singh Kapriwas, member of the Haryana Legislative Assembly
- Randhir Prasad (died 1980), Indian politician and businessman from Giridih, Bihar
- Rana Randhir, member of the Bharatiya Janata Party from Bihar
- Randhir Pralhadrao Savarkar (born 1973), member of the 15th Maharashtra Legislative Assembly

== Sports ==
- Randhir Singh (sport shooter) (born 1946), Indian trap and skeet shooter
- Randhir Singh Gentle (1922–1981), Indian field hockey player
- Randhir Singh (cricketer) (1957–2023), Indian cricketer

== Other ==
- Randhir Prasad Verma (1952–1991), Indian police officer
- Randhir Singh (Sikh) (1878–1961), Sikh saint
- Randhir Sud, Indian gastroenterologist
- NJSA Government College, formerly known as Randhir College

== See also ==
- Randhir Singh (disambiguation)
- Ranadheera, a 1998 Indian film
