= Girija Devi (politician) =

Indian politician

Member of Parliament, Lok Sabha
- In office 1991-96
- Preceded by: Ram Bahadur Singh
- Succeeded by: Ram Bahadur Singh
- Constituency: Maharajganj, Bihar

Personal details
- Born: 1 January 1941 (age 85) Chapra, Saran District, British India
- Party: Janata Dal
- Spouse: Baidya Nath Pandey
- Children: 1 Son and Daughter

Girija Devi was an Indian politician. She was elected to the Lok Sabha, lower house of the Parliament of India from Maharajganj, Bihar as member of the Janata Dal.
