= Gaya Town Assembly constituency =

Constituency of the Bihar legislative assembly in India

Coordinates: 24.79°N 85.00°E

Gaya Town
- Constituency No. 230 for the Bihar Legislative Assembly

Constituency details
- Country: India
- Region: East India
- State: Bihar
- District: Gaya
- Lok Sabha constituency: Gaya
- Established: 1951
- Total electors: 280,313
- Reservation: None

Member of Legislative Assembly
- 18th Bihar Legislative Assembly
- Incumbent Prem Kumar; Speaker of the Bihar Legislative Assembly
- Party: BJP
- Alliance: NDA
- Elected year: 2025

Gaya Town Assembly constituency is one of the 243 state Legislative Assembly seats in Bihar. This Constituency is mainly dominated by Kayastha, Rajput and Bhumihar Caste.

Most successful parties from Gaya Town Assembly
1. BJP + BJS (11 times) (61.0%)
2. INC (5 times) (28.0%)
3. IND (1 time) (5.00%)
4. JP (1 time) (6.00%)

== Members of the Legislative Assembly ==
Year	Name	Party
1952	Kesho Prasad	Indian National Congress
1957	S. M. Latifur Rehman	Indian National Congress
1962	Shyam Barthwar	Independent politician
1967	Gopal Mishra	Bharatiya Jana Sangh
1969	Gopal Mishra	Bharatiya Jana Sangh
1972	Yugal Kishore Prasad	Indian National Congress
1977	Sushila Sahay	Janata Party
1980	Jai Kumar Palit	Indian National Congress
1985	Jai Kumar Palit	Indian National Congress
1990	Prem Kumar	Bharatiya Janata Party
1995	Prem Kumar	Bharatiya Janata Party
2000	Prem Kumar	Bharatiya Janata Party
2005	Prem Kumar	Bharatiya Janata Party
2005	Prem Kumar	Bharatiya Janata Party
2010	Prem Kumar	Bharatiya Janata Party
2015	Prem Kumar	Bharatiya Janata Party
2020	Prem Kumar	Bharatiya Janata Party
2025	Prem Kumar	Bharatiya Janata Party

== Election results ==
=== 2025 ===
2025 Bihar Legislative Assembly election: Gaya Town
Party	Candidate	Votes	%	±%
BJP	Prem Kumar	90,878	54.43	▲4.54
INC	Akhoury Onkar Nath	64,455	38.61	▼2.41
JSP	Dhirendra Agarwal	4,479	2.68	
NOTA	None of the above	636	0.38	▼0.72
Majority		26,423	15.82	▲6.95
Turnout		166,958	59.56	▲9.83
BJP hold		Swing		

=== 2020 ===
Bihar Assembly election, 2020: Gaya Town
Party	Candidate	Votes	%	±%
BJP	Prem Kumar	66,932	49.89	−1.93
INC	Akhoury Onkar Nath	55,034	41.02	+6.86
NOTA	None of the above	1,476	1.1	+0.58
Majority		11,898	8.87	−8.79
Turnout		134,154	49.73	−2.29
BJP hold		Swing		

=== 2015 ===
2015 Bihar Legislative Assembly election: Gaya Town
Party	Candidate	Votes	%	±%
BJP	Prem Kumar	66,891	51.82	
INC	Priya Ranjan	44,102	34.16	
Independent	Raj Kumar Prasad Alias Raju Baranwal	7,170	5.55	
CPI	Masood Manzar	2,363	1.83	
Independent	Shashi Kishore Shishu	2,255	1.75	
Independent	Sanjay Kumar Srivastava	1,160	0.9	
NOTA	None of the above	670	0.52	
Majority		22,789	17.66	
Turnout		129,090	52.02	
BJP hold		Swing		

=== 2010 ===
2010 Bihar Legislative Assembly election: Gaya Town
Party	Candidate	Votes	%	±%
BJP	Prem Kumar	55,618	53.92	
CPI	Jalal Uddin Ansari	27,201	26.37	
INC	Akhoury Onkar Nath	7,664	7.43	
LJP	Raj Kumar Prasad	4,098	3.97	
BSP	Manoranjan Kumar Pathak	1,356	1.31	
Majority		28,417	27.55	
Turnout		103,153	48.00	
BJP hold		Swing		
