= Maharajganj, Bihar Assembly constituency =

Coordinates: 26°1′N 84°20′E

Maharajganj, Siwan Bihar
- Constituency No. 112 for the Bihar Legislative Assembly

Constituency details
- Country: India
- Region: East India
- State: Bihar
- District: Siwan
- Lok Sabha constituency: 19. Maharajganj
- Established: 1951
- Total electors: 302,398

Member of Legislative Assembly
- 18th Bihar Legislative Assembly
- Incumbent Hemnarayan Sah
- Party: JD(U)
- Alliance: NDA
- Elected year: 2025

Maharajganj is an assembly constituency in Siwan district in the Indian state of Bihar.

== Overview ==
As per Delimitation of Parliamentary and Assembly constituencies Order, 2008, No. 112 Maharajganj Assembly constituency is composed of the following: Maharajganj and Bhagwanpur Hat community development blocks.

Maharajganj Assembly constituency is part of No. 19 Maharajganj (Lok Sabha constituency).

== Members of the Legislative Assembly ==
Year	Name	Party
1952	Mahamaya Prasad Sinha	Kisan Mazdoor Praja Party
1957	Anusuya Devi	Indian National Congress
1962	Uma Shanker Prasad	Swatantra Party
1967	Kaushalendra Pratap Shahi	Praja Socialist Party
1969	Mahamaya Prasad Sinha	Bharatiya Kranti Dal
1972	Anusuya Devi	Indian National Congress
1977	Umashanker Singh	Janata Party
1980	Umashanker Singh	Janata Party
1985	Umashanker Singh	Janata Party
1990	Umashanker Singh	Janata Dal
1995	Baidya Nath Pande	Janata Dal
2000	Umashanker Singh	Samata Party
2005	Damodar Singh	Janata Dal (United)
2005	Damodar Singh	Janata Dal (United)
2010	Damodar Singh	Janata Dal (United)
2015	Hemnarayan Sah	Janata Dal (United)
2020	Vijay Shankar Dubey	Indian National Congress
2025	Hemnarayan Sah	Janata Dal

== Election results ==
=== 2025 ===
2025 Bihar Legislative Assembly election: Maharajganj
Party	Candidate	Votes	%	±%
JD(U)	Hem Narayan Sah	86,813	46.22	+17.36
RJD	Ashok Jaiswal	65,714	34.99	
JSP	Sunil Ray	8,165	4.35	
Independent	Nitish Kumar Diwedi	6,254	3.33	
Independent	Ravindra Kumar	4,358	2.32	
Independent	Raj Kishor Gupta	2,902	1.55	
ASP(KR)	Madan Yadav	2,373	1.26	
BSP	Ravi Ranjan Tisu	2,176	1.16	
Political Team India	Dr. Vikas Kumar Singh	2,129	1.13	
NOTA	None of the above	3,675	1.96	+0.44
Majority		21,099	11.23	+10.02
Turnout		187,810	62.11	+8.49
JD(U) gain from INC		Swing		

=== 2020 ===
2020 Bihar Legislative Assembly election: Maharajganj
Party	Candidate	Votes	%	±%
INC	Vijay Shanker Dubey	48,825	30.07	
JD(U)	Hem Narayan Sah	46,849	28.86	−16.65
LJP	Dr. Deo Ranjan Singh	18,278	11.26	
Azad Samaj Party	Ejaz Ahmad Siddique	7,714	4.75	
RLSP	Ajit Prasad	4,983	3.07	
JAP(L)	Bishwanath Yadaeo	3,393	2.09	+0.72
Independent	Om Prakash Sharma	2,185	1.35	+0.04
Janta Dal Rashtravadi	Satyendra Kumar Gandhi	2,146	1.32	−2.5
JP	Kamakhya Narain Singh	2,122	1.31	
Independent	Dharmendra Mahato	1,948	1.2	
Independent	Khadim Hussain	1,849	1.14	
Rashtriya Sahyog Party	Rajiv Kumar Urph Gandhi Jee	1,741	1.07	
Bharat Ka Kisan Majdoor Party	Nayan Prasad	1,699	1.05	
JP(S)	Shree Bhagwan Singh	1,631	1.0	
Independent	Sushil Kumar Dablu	1,624	1.0	
Independent	Vishwambhar Singh	1,538	0.95	
Independent	Amit Kumar	1,479	0.91	
NOTA	None of the above	2,473	1.52	+0.41
Majority		1,976	1.21	−12.28
Turnout		162,353	53.62	−0.7
INC gain from JD(U)		Swing		

=== 2015 ===
2015 Bihar Legislative Assembly election: Maharajganj
Party	Candidate	Votes	%	±%
JD(U)	Hem Narayan Sah	68,459	45.51	
BJP	Kumar Deo Ranjan Singh	48,167	32.02	
Janta Dal Rashtravadi	Satyendra Kumar Gandhi	5,743	3.82	
Independent	Manoranjan Kumar Singh	4,864	3.23	
CPI(M)	Munshi Singh	3,909	2.6	
Independent	Rabindra Ray	3,108	2.07	
JAP(L)	Bishawanath Yadeo	2,054	1.37	
CPI	Rajendra Singh	2,049	1.36	
Independent	Om Prakash Sharma	1,974	1.31	
Bharti Samudaya Party	Atish Singh	1,549	1.03	
NOTA	None of the above	1,671	1.11	
Majority		20,292	13.49	
Turnout		150,439	54.32	
Bhartiya New Sanskar Krantikari Party	Om Prakash Singh	1,103	0.73	
