= Kedar Nath Singh =

Kedar Nath Singh may refer to:

- Kedar Nath Singh (Bihar politician) (born 1969)
- Kedar Nath Singh (Uttar Pradesh politician)
- Kedarnath Singh (1934–2018), Indian poet
