= Masrakh Assembly constituency =

Former Assembly constituency in Bihar, India

Coordinates: 26°05′12″N 84°48′04″E

Masrakh
- Former constituency for the Bihar Legislative Assembly

Constituency details
- Country: India
- Region: East India
- State: Bihar
- District: Saran
- Established: 1957
- Abolished: 2008

Masrakh Assembly constituency was an assembly constituency in Saran district in the Indian state of Bihar.

== Overview ==
Masrakh Assembly constituency ceased to exist in 2010 following orders of the Delimitation Commission of India.

== Members of Vidhan Sabha ==
Year	Member	Party
1957	Krishna Madhav Sinha (Note: Masrakh North)	Indian National Congress
1957	Mritunjoy Singh (Note: Masrakh South)	Praja Socialist Party
1962	Prabhu Nath Singh (Note: Masrakh North)	Indian National Congress
1962	Raj Kumari Devi (Note: Masrakh South)	Indian National Congress
1967	Prabhu Nath Singh	Indian National Congress
1969	Kashi Nath Rai	Praja Socialist Party
1972	Ram Deo Singh	Indian National Congress
1977	Krishnadeo Narain Singh	Janata Party
1980	Ram Deo Singh	Indian National Congress (I)
1981^	Harendra Kishore Singh	Independent
1985	Prabhunath Singh	Independent
1990	Prabhunath Singh	Janata Dal
1995	Ashok Singh	Janata Dal
1996^	Tarkeshwar Singh	Independent
2000	Tarkeshwar Singh	Rashtriya Janata Dal
2005	Tarkeshwar Singh	Independent
2005	Kedar Nath Singh	Janata Dal (United)
2010 onwards: Constituency does not exist
