= Manoj Kumar (Bihar politician) =

Indian politician (born 1976)

Manoj Kumar Sharma
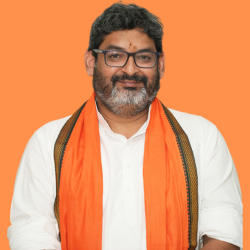

Member of Bihar Legislative Assembly
- Incumbent
- Assumed office 2025
- Preceded by: Maha Nand Singh
- Constituency: Arwal
- In office 2015–2020
- Preceded by: Ranvijay Kumar
- Succeeded by: Bheem Kumar Yadav
- Constituency: Goh

Personal details
- Born: 13 November 1976 (age 49) Bithra, Arwal district, Bihar
- Party: Bharatiya Janata Party
- Spouse: Suchitra Kumari
- Children: 2 daughters
- Parent: Dev Kumar Sharma (father)

Manoj Kumar Sharma is an Indian politician belonging to the Bharatiya Janata Party (BJP). He is currently a Member of the Bihar Legislative Assembly from the Arwal Assembly constituency. He also serves as the Spokesperson and Media In-charge of the Bharatiya Janta Party - Bihar Unit.

== Family ==
He is the son of former MLA and politician Devkumar Sharma. His father, Devkumar Sharma represented Goh constituency in 1985 from Congress and 2000 from Samta Party.

== Political career ==
Manoj Kumar was first time elected to the Bihar Legislative Assembly in 2015 from the Goh Assembly constituency as a BJP candidate.

In the 2020 Bihar Legislative Assembly election, he contested again from Goh Assembly constituency but was defeated by RJD candidate Bheem Kumar Yadav.

In the 2025 Bihar Legislative Assembly election, Manoj Kumar contested from the Arwal Assembly constituency and defeated Maha Nand Singh by a margin of 14,093 votes. With this victory, he was elected to the Bihar Legislative Assembly for the second time as a BJP MLA.
