= Baniapur Assembly constituency =

Coordinates: 26°00′05″N 84°42′00″E

Baniapur
- Constituency No. - for the Bihar Legislative Assembly

Constituency details
- Country: India
- Region: East India
- State: Bihar
- Established: 1951
- Total electors: 317,424

Member of Legislative Assembly
- 18th Bihar Legislative Assembly
- Incumbent Kedar Nath Singh
- Party: BJP
- Alliance: NDA
- Elected year: 2025

Baniapur Assembly constituency is an assembly constituency in Saran district in the Indian state of Bihar.

== Overview ==
As per Delimitation of Parliamentary and Assembly constituencies Order, 2008, No. 115 Baniapur Assembly constituency is composed of the following: Baniapur (except Karhi, Manikpura and Lauwa Kala gram panchayats) and Mashrakh community development blocks.

Baniapur Assembly constituency is part of No. 19 Maharajganj (Lok Sabha constituency).

== Members of the Legislative Assembly ==
Year	Name	Party
1952	Vishwanath Mishra	Indian National Congress
1957	Uma Pandey	Indian National Congress
1962	Uma Pandey	Indian National Congress
1967	Uma Pandey	Indian National Congress
1969	Ramanand Mishra	Samyukta Socialist Party
1972	Uma Pandey	Indian National Congress
1977	Ramakant Pandey	Janata Party
1980	Uma Pandey	Indian National Congress
1985	Uma Pandey	Indian National Congress
1990	Ram Bahadur Rai	Janata Party
1995	Ram Bahadur Rai	Janata Dal
2000	Manoranjan Singh	Independent politician
2005	Manoranjan Singh	Lok Janshakti Party
2005	Manoranjan Singh	Janata Dal (United)
2010	Kedar Nath Singh	Rashtriya Janata Dal
2015	Kedar Nath Singh	Rashtriya Janata Dal
2020	Kedar Nath Singh	Rashtriya Janata Dal
2025	Kedar Nath Singh	Bharatiya Janata Party

== Election results ==
=== 2025 ===
Bihar Assembly election, 2025: Baniapur
Party	Candidate	Votes	%	±%
BJP	Kedar Nath Singh	95,606	47.7	
RJD	Chandani Devi	80,170	40.0	+1.26
JSP	Shravan Kumar	8,638	4.31	
Independent	Shyam Singh	3,831	1.91	
Independent	Ravi Prakash	2,850	1.42	
NOTA	None of the above	4,876	2.43	−0.34
Majority		15,436	7.7	−8.81
Turnout		200,418	63.14	+10.3
BJP gain from RJD		Swing		

=== 2020 ===
Bihar Assembly election, 2020: Baniapur
Party	Candidate	Votes	%	±%
RJD	Kedar Nath Singh	65,194	38.74	▼7.13
VIP	Virendra Kumar Ojha	37,405	22.23	
LJP	Tarkeshwar Singh	33,082	19.66	
Independent	Sumit Kumar Gupta	12,485	7.42	
Independent	Pushpa Kumari	2,395	1.42	
Independent	Sudhir Kumar	2,157	1.28	
Independent	Dablu Kumar	2,124	1.26	
Independent	Narayan Pd. Yadaw	2,039	1.21	
Janta Dal Rashtravadi	Anil Kumar Ram	1,882	1.12	
BSP	Nawal Kishor Kushwaha	1,726	1.03	▲0.06
NOTA	None of the above	4,657	2.77	▼1.58
Majority		27,789	16.51	▲6.04
Turnout		168,297	52.84	▲2.27
RJD hold		Swing		

=== 2015 ===
2015 Bihar Legislative Assembly election: Baniapur
Party	Candidate	Votes	%	±%
RJD	Kedar Nath Singh	69,851	45.87	
BJP	Tarkeshwar Singh	53,900	35.4	
Independent	Virendra Kumar Ojha	13,545	8.9	
BSP	Bikrma Ram	1,481	0.97	
NOTA	None of the above	6,628	4.35	
Majority		15,951	10.47	
Turnout		152,266	50.57	
