= Bheem Kumar Yadav =

Indian politician

Bhim Kumar Singh
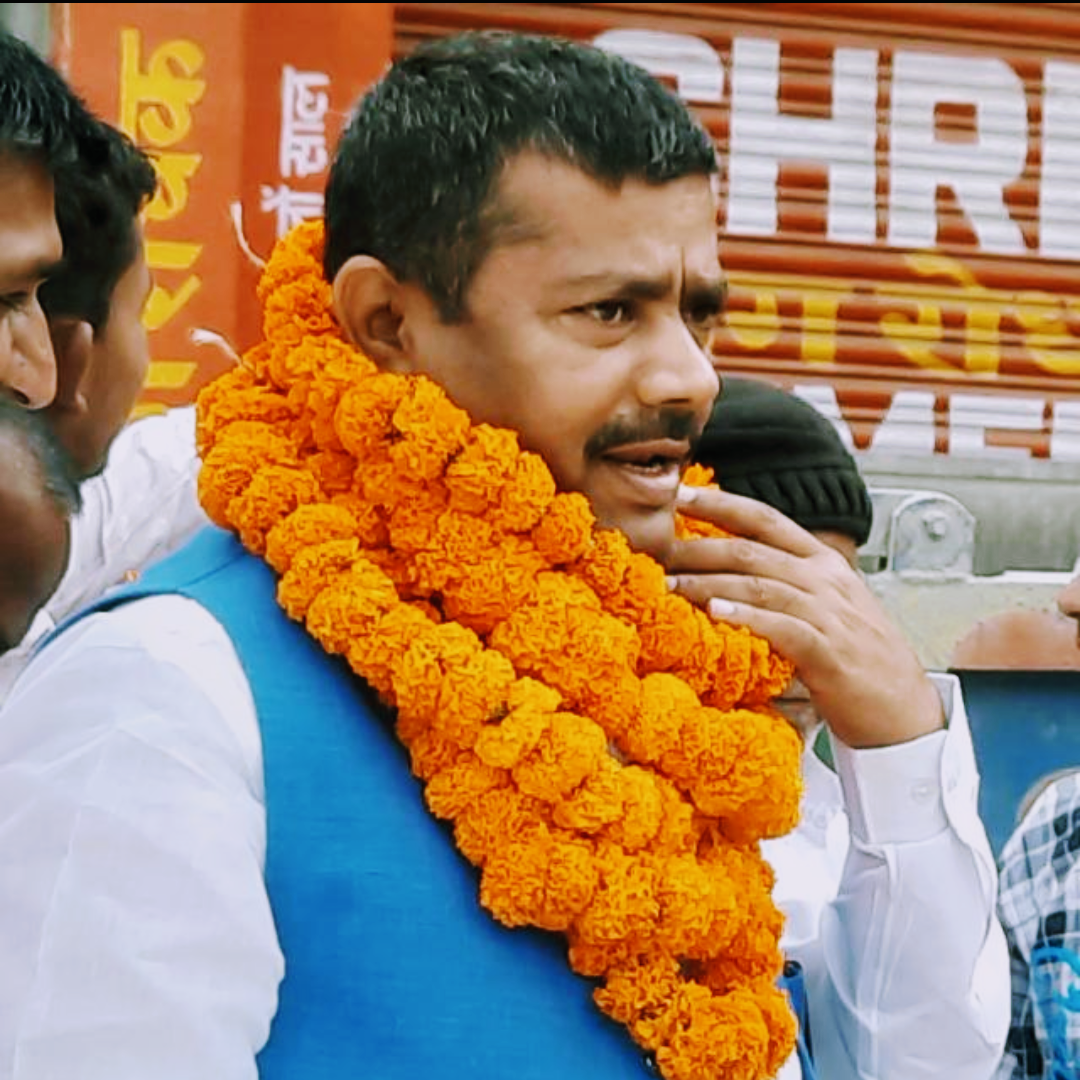

Member of Bihar Legislative Assembly
- In office 2000–2005
- Preceded by: Virendra Kumar Singh
- Succeeded by: Vijay Kumar Singh
- Constituency: Nabinagar

Member of Bihar Legislative Assembly
- In office 2020–2025
- Preceded by: Manoj Kumar
- Succeeded by: Amrendra Kushwaha
- Constituency: Goh

Personal details
- Born: Nabinagar, Aurangabad, Bihar
- Party: Rashtriya Janata Dal
- Children: Chirag Yadav
- Parent: Keshav Singh Yadav
- Education: B.A. Graduate from Magadh University
- Occupation: Agriculturist
- Profession: Politician; Social Worker

Bhim Kumar Singh, Bhim Yadav popularly known as Magadh Samrat is an Indian politician and a member of Bihar Legislative Assembly of India. He was elected in 2000 as a member of Rashtriya Janata Dal from Nabinagar constituency in the Aurangabad district of Bihar.

== Political life ==
- Yadav was elected from Nabinagar, Bihar in 2000 as a member of Rashtriya Janata Dal.
- In 2020 Bihar Legislative Assembly election Yadav prepared for the elections (Nabinagar) but at the time of election RJD denied him this constituency and given Goh constituency.
