= Satyendra Yadav =

Indian politician

Bihar Legislative Assembly
- In office 2020–2025
- Constituency: Manjhi

Personal details
- Party: CPI (M)
- Occupation: Politics

Dr. Satyendra Yadav is an Indian politician from Bihar. A social worker, he graduated from Jai Prakash University Chapra in 2005 and holds a Ph.D. from Patna University (2010). He was the former President of Students' Federation of India Bihar state committee. He is currently representing Manjhi (Vidhan Sabha Constituency) in the Bihar State Legislative Assembly representing the Communist Party of India (Marxist).

In the 2020 state elections, 43 year old Dr. Satyendra Yadav won the Manjhi seat for the CPI (M) beating Rana Pratap Singh, an Independent candidate, by a margin of 25386 votes.

== Political career ==
2020 Vidhan Sabha Election

Manjhi (Vidhan Sabha Constituency), Bihar (2020 Election)
Result Status
O.S.N.	Candidate	Party	EVM Votes	Postal Votes	Total votes	% of votes
1	OM PRAKASH PRASAD	Rashtriya Lok Samta Party	10040	69	10109	6.4
2	KAMAL NAYAN PATHAK	Nationalist Congress Party	571	20	591	0.37
3	MADHAVI KUMARI	Janata Dal (United)	28855	300	29155	18.46
4	Dr. Satyendra Yadav	Communist Party of India (Marxist)	58863	461	59324	37.56
5	SAURABH KUMAR PANDEY	Lok Jan Shakti Party	3680	45	3725	2.36
6	RAVI RANJAN SINGH	Rashtriya Jan Jan Party	1657	15	1672	1.06
7	RAJ KUMAR TIWARI	Bharatiya Jan Kranti Dal (Democratic)	759	3	762	0.48
8	SHAIKH NAUSHAD	Aazad Samaj Party (Kanshi Ram)	983	10	993	0.63
9	ATUL BHASKAR	Independent	882	4	886	0.56
10	VINOD KUMAR MANJHI	Independent	762	3	765	0.48
11	RANA PRATAP SINGH	Independent	33709	229	33938	21.49
12	RAM NARAYAN YADAV	Independent	1560	1	1561	0.99
13	VIJAY PRATAP SINGH	Independent	7348	26	7374	4.67
14	SHANKAR SHARMA	Independent	2344	1	2345	1.48
15	SUJIT PURI	Independent	1354	1	1355	0.86
16	SAURABH SUNNY	Independent	2467	2	2469	1.56
17	NOTA	None of the Above	900	6	906	0.57
	Total		156734	1196	157930	
