= Arwal Assembly constituency =

Assembly constituency in Bihar, India

Coordinates: 25.24°N 84.67°E

Arwal
- Constituency No. 214 for the Bihar Legislative Assembly

Constituency details
- Country: India
- Region: East India
- State: Bihar
- District: Arwal
- Lok Sabha constituency: Jahanabad (Lok Sabha constituency)
- Established: 1951
- Total electors: 268,421

Member of Legislative Assembly
- 18th Bihar Legislative Assembly
- Incumbent Manoj Kumar Sharma
- Party: BJP
- Alliance: NDA
- Elected year: 2025

Arwal Assembly constituency is an assembly constituency for Bihar Legislative Assembly in Arwal district of Bihar, India. It comes under Jahanabad (Lok Sabha constituency).

== Members of Legislative Assembly ==
| Year | Name | Party |
|---|---|---|
| 1952 | Gudani Singh Yadav | Socialist Party |
| 1957 | Budhan Mehta | Indian National Congress |
| 1962 | Budhan Mehta | Indian National Congress |
| 1967 | Shah Zohair | Communist Party of India |
| 1969 | Shah Zohair | Communist Party of India |
| 1972 | Rang Bahadur Singh | Independent |
| 1977 | Baneshwar Prasad Singh | Janata Party |
| 1980 | Krishana Nandan Prasad Singh | Independent |
| 1985 | Krishana Nandan Prasad Singh | Independent |
| 1990 | Krishana Nandan Prasad Singh | Independent |
| 1995 | Ravindra Kushwaha | Janata Dal |
| 2000 | Akhilesh Prasad Singh | Rashtriya Janata Dal |
| 2005 | Dularchand Singh Yadav | Lok Janshakti Party |
| 2010 | Chitranjan Kumar | Bharatiya Janata Party |
| 2015 | Ravindra Kushwaha | Rashtriya Janata Dal |
| 2020 | Maha Nand Singh | Communist Party of India (Marxist–Leninist) Liberation |
| 2025 | Manoj Kumar Sharma | Bharatiya Janata Party |

== Election results ==
=== 2025 ===
Bihar Assembly election, 2025: Arwal
| Party | Candidate | Votes | % | ±% |
|---|---|---|---|---|
| BJP | Manoj Kumar Sharma | 79,854 | 46.66 | +13.26 |
| CPI(ML)L | Maha Nand Singh | 65,761 | 38.43 | −8.75 |
| Independent | Veerendra Prasad Alias Veerendra Kumar | 3,879 | 2.27 | |
| BSP | Shekhar Ram | 3,719 | 2.17 | |
| JSP | Kunti Devi | 3,376 | 1.97 | |
| SBSP | Pancham Kumar | 3,176 | 1.86 | |
| Independent | Satyendra Prasad Sharma | 2,726 | 1.59 | |
| RLJP | Divya Bharti | 1,724 | 1.01 | |
| Independent | Amitesh Kumar | 1,617 | 0.94 | |
| NOTA | None of the above | 1,451 | 0.85 | −0.79 |
| Majority | | 14,093 | 8.23 | −5.55 |
| Turnout | | 171,135 | 63.76 | +7.81 |
| BJP gain from | | Swing | NDA | |

=== 2020 ===
Bihar Assembly election, 2020: Arwal
| Party | Candidate | Votes | % | ±% |
|---|---|---|---|---|
| CPI(ML)L | Maha Nand Singh | 68,286 | 47.18 | |
| BJP | Dipak Kumar Sharma | 48,336 | 33.4 | +4.5 |
| RLSP | Subhash Chandra Yadav | 7,941 | 5.49 | |
| JP | Mohan Kumar | 2,594 | 1.79 | |
| Independent | Ajay Kumar | 2,342 | 1.62 | |
| Independent | Anita Kumari | 1,498 | 1.03 | |
| Bhartiya Sablog Party | Vimala Kumari | 1,337 | 0.92 | |
| NOTA | None of the above | 2,372 | 1.64 | −0.34 |
| Majority | | 19,950 | 13.78 | +0.06 |
| Turnout | | 144,740 | 55.95 | +3.19 |
| CPI(ML)L gain from RJD | | Swing | | |

=== 2015 ===
2015 Bihar Legislative Assembly election: Arwal
| Party | Candidate | Votes | % | ±% |
|---|---|---|---|---|
| RJD | Ravindra Singh | 55,295 | 42.62 | |
| BJP | Chitranjan Kumar | 37,485 | 28.9 | |
| CPI(ML)L | Mahanand Prasad | 21,354 | 16.46 | |
| JAP(L) | Raunak | 3,650 | 2.81 | |
| BSP | Arjun Thakur | 2,584 | 1.99 | |
| SP | Amrendra Kumar | 1,702 | 1.31 | |
| Independent | Virendra Kumar | 1,343 | 1.04 | |
| Independent | Sikandar Kumar | 1,312 | 1.01 | |
| NOTA | None of the above | 2,574 | 1.98 | |
| Majority | | 17,810 | 13.72 | |
| Turnout | | 129,725 | 52.76 | |
