= Ravindra Singh Kushwaha =

Former legislator from Bihar, India

Ravindra Singh
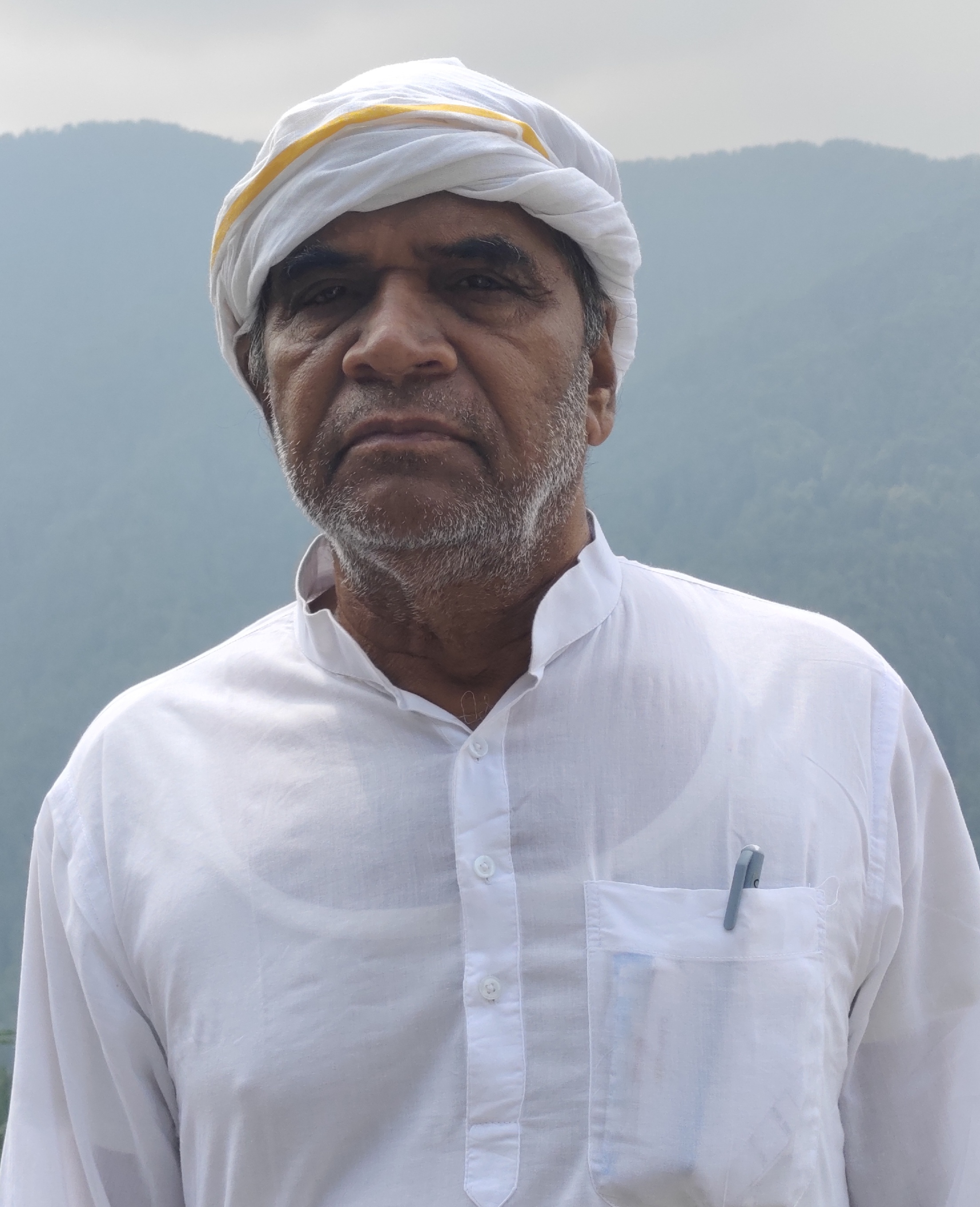
- Ravindra singh

Bihar Legislative Assembly
- In office 1995–2000
- Constituency: Arwal Assembly constituency
- In office 2015–2020
- Constituency: Arwal Assembly constituency

Personal details
- Born: 07-01-1953 Hichhan Bigha
- Party: Rashtriya Janata Dal
- Parent: Late Hardayal Singh (Father)
- Occupation: Politics

Ravindra Singh also known as Ravindra Singh Kushwaha is an Indian politician based in Bihar, who was elected to Bihar Legislative Assembly twice from Arwal Assembly constituency. Singh was a member of Janata Dal and later became a member of Rashtriya Janata Dal. He is considered as one of the close accomplice of former Bihar Chief Minister, Lalu Prasad Yadav. Singh hails from communist background and before joining politics, he was a member of armed naxalite organisations active in the Bihar's red corridor.

== Life ==
Singh was born to Hardayal Singh and spent later part of his life in Patna at his residence near Jagdeo Path. He is a member of Kushwaha (Koeri) caste of Bihar. Before moving to Patna, he was an active Maoist. Singh was born in a prosperous farmer family, which owned 4.32 acre land in Aurangabad district of Bihar, besides residential land in Aurangabad. He took part in insurgencies conducted by several naxal organisations active in the state of Bihar, against the landlords. In the course of violence between the landlords and the naxal foot soldiers, he had to remain underground for 13 to 14 years to escape imprisonment. During this period, his house was raided 135 times and his ancestral property was attached by the police. He was discovered by Lalu Prasad Yadav in 1990s and all the cases pending against him were dropped in a supervision report, after Yadav assumed the premiership of the state. In 1994, District police gave him clean chit in all the cases lodged against him. In his election affidavit submitted to Election Commission of India, he admitted ownership of weapons, which included a revolver and a rifle.

He married Usha Saran, with whom he had two sons, Gaurav and Shashikant Prabhakar. Singh was brought into politics by Lalu Prasad Yadav, who first made him a candidate of Janata Dal in 1995 from Arwal Assembly constituency.

In 2015, he was again made a candidate of Rashtriya Janata Dal from Arwal constituency and he defeated Chitranjan Kumar of Bharatiya Janata Party. He got 55,295 votes in this election, with Kumar and CPI-ML candidate Mahanand Singh finishing in second and third spot respectively.

In 2023, his younger son Gaurav alias Diwakar was shot dead near Hichhan Bigha village in Aurangabad district of Bihar. Gaurav owned a poultry farm in the village and used to reside at his ancestral village. Gaurav had contested Bihar Assembly elections in 2020 as an independent candidate from Arwal constituency.
