= Kesho Prasad =

Kesho Prasad was an Indian freedom fighter and politician. He won the first 1952 Bihar Legislative Assembly election from Gaya town. He was the member of Indian National Congress and won against the independent candidate Paras Nath Singh. He won with the margin of 9363 votes and received 61.52% of valid votes.

He went to Cellular jail in 1934 for his role in Gaya Conspiracy case during freedom movement.

== Role in freedom movement ==
In age of 27, he was active in freedom struggle along with Shayam Charan Bharthuar, Vishwanath Mathur and other revolutionaries. British govt has arrested him and his friends for Gaya Conspiracy case and sent him to the Cellular Jail where he spent around four years in 1934.

He had declined the offer made by British to be approver and accepted the jailed decision made by additional session judge of Gaya.

== Post-independence activity ==
Kesho Prasad was a homeopathic doctor and fought first legislative election 1952 from Gaya town constituency. He was the first elected MLA of Gaya town.
