= Randhir Singh =

Randhir Singh may refer to:

- Randhir Singh of Kapurthala (1831–1870), ruler of the Indian princely state of Kapurthala
- Randhir Singh of Bharatpur (died 1823), ruler of the Indian princely state of Bharatpur
- Randhir Singh (Sikh) (1878–1961), regarded by many Sikhs as a Saint
- Randhir Singh (sports administrator) (1946–2026), Olympic-level trap and skeet shooter and sports administrator
- Randhir Singh (cricketer) (1957–2023), Indian cricketer
- Randhir Singh (academic) (1922–2016), Indian political theorist
- Randhir Kumar Singh (born 1982), Indian politician
- Randhir Singh (Jammu and Kashmir politician) (active from 1972), see Billawar (Vidhan Sabha constituency)

== See also ==
- Randhir (disambiguation)
