= 1952 Bihar Legislative Assembly election =

Election in India

- 26 March 1952

All 330 seats in the Bihar Legislative Assembly 166 seats needed for a majority
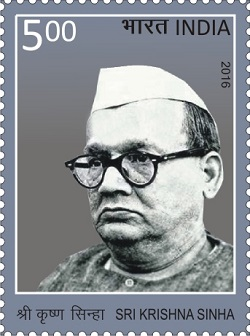
	Majority party	Minority party
Leader	Shri Krishna Sinha
Party	INC	JKP
Seats won	239	32
Popular vote	39,51,145	7,65,272
Percentage	41.38%	8.01%
Chief Minister before election
Shri Krishna Sinha
INC
Elected Chief Minister
Shri Krishna Sinha
INC

Elections were held in March 1952 for the Bihar Legislative Assembly. There were 276 constituencies with 50 of them being two-member constituencies. The Indian National Congress (INC) stormed into power. Shri Krishna Singh became the first elected Chief Minister of Bihar and Dr. Anugrah Narayan Sinha became the first Deputy Chief Minister cum Finance Minister of the state.

Seat won by parties
1. Congress (239 seats) (72.4%)
2. Jharkhand Party (32 seats) (9.69%)
3. Socialist Party (23 seats) (6.96%)
4. CNSPJP (11 seats) (3.33%)
5. LSS (7 seats) (2.12%)
6. Independent (14 seats) (4.24%)
7. Others (4 seats) (1.24%)

== Parties ==
=== National parties ===
1. Bharatiya Jana Sangh
2. Communist Party of India
3. Forward Bloc (Marxist Group)
4. Forward Bloc (Ruikar)
5. Akhil Bharatiya Hindu Mahasabha
6. Indian National Congress
7. Kisan Mazdoor Praja Party
8. Akhil Bharatiya Ram Rajya Parishad
9. Revolutionary Socialist Party
10. Scheduled Caste Federation
11. Socialist Party

=== State parties ===
1. Chota Nagpur Santhal Parganas Janata Party
2. Jharkhand Party
3. Lok Sewak Sangh
4. All India United Kisan Sabha

=== Registered (unrecognised) parties ===
1. All India Ganatantra Parishad

== Results ==
Summary of results of the 1952 Bihar Legislative Assembly election
Political party	Flag	Seats Contested	Won	% of Seats	Votes	Vote %
Indian National Congress		322	239	72.42	39,51,145	41.38
Socialist Party		266	23	6.97	17,29,750	18.11
Kisan Mazdoor Praja Party		98	1	0.30	2,68,416	2.81
Jharkhand Party		53	32	9.70	7,65,272	8.01
Chota Nagpur Santhal Parganas Janata Party		38	11	3.33	3,01,691	3.16
Forward Bloc (Marxist Group)		34	1	0.30	1,07,386	1.12
Akhil Bharatiya Ram Rajya Parishad		29	1	0.30	60,360	0.63
Lok Sewak Sangh		12	7	2.12	1,48,921	1.56
All India Ganatantra Parishad		1	1	0.30	14,237	0.15
Independent		638	14	4.24	18,77,236	19.66
Total seats		330	Voters	2,41,65,389	Turnout	95,48,835 (39.51%)

Party wise votes polled
1. Indian National Congress (41.4%)
2. Jharkhand Party (8.01%)
3. Socialist Party (18.1%)
4. CNSPJP (3.16%)
5. Lok Sewak Sangh (1.56%)
6. Independent (19.7%)
7. Others (8.12%)

== Elected members ==
Constituency	Reserved for (ST/None)	Member	Party
Maner	None	Rameshwar Prasad Shastri	Indian National Congress
Danapur	None	Jagat Narain Lal	Indian National Congress
Patna City West Cum Naubatpur	None	Mungeri Lal	Indian National Congress
Patna City West Cum Naubatpur	None	Badri Nath Verma	Indian National Congress
Patna City East	None	Nawabzada Syed Mohammad Mehdi	Indian National Congress
Fatuha	None	Deo Saran Sinha	Indian National Congress
Punpun-cum-Masaurhi	None	Saraswati Chaudhari	Indian National Congress
Punpun-cum-Masaurhi	None	Ram Khelawan Sinha	Indian National Congress
Chandi	None	Dhanraj Sharma	Indian National Congress
Ekangarsarai	None	Tayagi Lal Singh	Indian National Congress
Islam-cum-Silao	None	Sheo Saran Prasad Sharma	Indian National Congress
Islam-cum-Silao	None	Mahabir Prasad	Indian National Congress
Mokama	None	Jagdish Narain Sinha	Indian National Congress
Barh	None	Rana Sheolakh Pati Sinha	Indian National Congress
Ashthawan	None	Tajuddin	Indian National Congress
Bihar North	None	Girwardhari Singh	Indian National Congress
Bihar South	None	Md. Aquil Syed	Indian National Congress
Bakhtiarpur	None	Sundri Devi	Indian National Congress
Bihta	None	Manorma Devi	Indian National Congress
Paliganj	None	Ram Lakhan Singh Yadav	Indian National Congress
Pakribarawan-cum-Warsaliganj	None	Chetu Ram	Indian National Congress
Pakribarawan-cum-Warsaliganj	None	Manzoor Ahmad	Indian National Congress
Nawada-cum-Hasua	None	Shakti Kumar	Indian National Congress
Nawada-cum-Hasua	None	Ram Kishun Singh	Indian National Congress
Rajauli-cum-Wazirganj	None	Radha Krishna Pd. Sinha	Indian National Congress
Rajauli-cum-Wazirganj	None	Mahabir Chaudhry	Indian National Congress
Atri	None	Rameshwar Prasad Yadav	Independent
Gaya Town	None	Kesho Prasad	Indian National Congress
Sherghati-cum-Imamganj	None	Deodhari Chamar	Indian National Congress
Sherghati-cum-Imamganj	None	Jaglal Mahato	Indian National Congress
Bodh Gaya-cum-Paraiva	None	Jugeshwar Prasad Khalish	Indian National Congress
Bodh Gaya-cum-Paraiva	None	Rameshwar Manjhi	Indian National Congress
Arwal	None	Gudani Singh	Socialist Party
Kurtha	None	Ramacharan Singh	Socialist Party
Jahanabad	None	Sheobhajan Singh	Socialist Party
Ghosi	None	Ram Chandra Yadav	Independent
Makhdumpur	None	Rameshwar Yadav	Independent
Tikari	None	Mithileshwar Prasad Sinha	Indian National Congress
Daudnagar	None	Ram Naresh Singh	Socialist Party
Goh	None	Mundrika Singh	Socialist Party
Rafiganj	None	S. M. Latifur Rahman	Indian National Congress
Aurangabad	None	Priyabrat Narain Sinha	Indian National Congress
Obra	None	Padarath Singh	Socialist Party
Nabinagar	None	Anugrah Narayan Sinha	Indian National Congress
Barhara	None	Rambilas Sinha	Akhil Bharatiya Ram Rajya Parishad
Arrah Muffasil	None	Ambika Sharan Singh	Indian National Congress
Arrah Town	None	Rang Bahadur Prasad	Indian National Congress
Sahar	None	Deo Naryan Singh	Indian National Congress
Chainpur	None	Gupta Nath Singh	Indian National Congress
Bhabua-cum-Mohania	None	Ram Nagina Singh	Indian National Congress
Bhabua-cum-Mohania	None	Dularchand Ram	Indian National Congress
Sasaram-cum-Rohtas	None	Govind Chamar	Indian National Congress
Sasaram-cum-Rohtas	None	Jagannath Singh	Indian National Congress
Dehri	None	Basawon Singh	Socialist Party
Ramgarh	None	Ram Chandra Rai	Indian National Congress
Itarhi	None	Raja Ram Arya	Indian National Congress
Buxar	None	Lakshmi Kant Tiwary	Indian National Congress
Dumraon	None	Harihar Prasad Singh	Indian National Congress
Brahampur	None	Lallan Singh	Indian National Congress
Shahpur	None	Ramanand Tiwary	Socialist Party
Jagdishpur	None	Sumitra Devi	Indian National Congress
Bikramganj	None	Hemraj Yadav	Indian National Congress
Nokha	None	Raghunath Prasad Sah	Indian National Congress
Dinara	None	Ramanand Upadhya	Indian National Congress
Tarari-cum-Piro	None	Devidayal Ram	Socialist Party
Tarari-cum-Piro	None	Radha Mohan Rai	Socialist Party
Kuchaikot	None	Shiva Kumar Pathak	Indian National Congress
Gopalganj	None	Kamla Rai	Indian National Congress
Barauli	None	Abdul Ghafoor Mian	Indian National Congress
Baikunthpur	None	Shivabachan Trivedi	Indian National Congress
Katea-cum-Bhore	None	Nand Kishore Narayan	Indian National Congress
Katea-cum-Bhore	None	Chandrika Ram	Indian National Congress
Mirganj	None	Janardan Sinha	Indian National Congress
Barharia	None	Saghirul Haque	Indian National Congress
Siwan	None	Ram Baswan Ram	Indian National Congress
Siwan	None	Shankar Nath	Indian National Congress
Mairwa	None	Gadadhar Prasad	Indian National Congress
Darauli	None	Ramayan Shukla	Indian National Congress
Raghunathpur	None	Ram Nandan Yadav	Indian National Congress
Manjhi	None	Girish Tiwary	Indian National Congress
Maharajganj	None	Mahamaya Pd. Sinha	Kisan Mazdoor Praja Party
Ekma	None	Laksmi Narain Singh	Indian National Congress
Basantpur West	None	Krishna Kant Singh	Indian National Congress
Basantpur East	None	Hari Kishore Prasad	Indian National Congress
Masarakh North	None	Baij Nath Singh	Indian National Congress
Masarakh South	None	Sukh Deo Narayan Mahath	Indian National Congress
Marhaura	None	Ram Swarup Devi	Indian National Congress
Baniapur	None	Bishwa Nath Mishra	Indian National Congress
Chapra Town	None	Murli Manohar Pd.	Indian National Congress
Chapra Muffasil-cum-Garakha	None	Jaglal Choudhary	Indian National Congress
Chapra Muffasil-cum-Garakha	None	Prabhu Nath Singh	Indian National Congress
Parsa	None	Daroga Prasad Rai	Indian National Congress
Dighwara	None	Ram Binod Singh	Indian National Congress
Sonepur	None	Jagadish Sharma	Indian National Congress
Bagaha-cum-Ram Nagar	None	Jagarnath Prasad Srivastava	Indian National Congress
Bagaha-cum-Ram Nagar	None	Kedar Pandey	Indian National Congress
Shikarpur-cum-Lauria	None	Raghuni Baitha	Indian National Congress
Shikarpur-cum-Lauria	None	Biswa Nath Sinha	Indian National Congress
Sikta	None	Faizul Rahman	Indian National Congress
Dhanaha	None	Sudama Mishra	Indian National Congress
Bettiah	None	Prajapati Mishra	Indian National Congress
Nautan	None	Parbati Devi	Indian National Congress
Sugauli	None	Jai Narain Prasad	Indian National Congress
Harsidhi	None	Haribansh Sahai	Indian National Congress
Motihari-cum-Pipra	None	Yamuna Ram	Indian National Congress
Motihari-cum-Pipra	None	Ganesh Prasad Sah	Indian National Congress
Raxaul	None	Radha Pandey	Indian National Congress
Adapur	None	Ram Sunder Tiwari	Indian National Congress
Ghorasahan	None	Ram Ayodhya Prasad	Socialist Party
Dhaka	None	Mashood Moulvi	Indian National Congress
Patabi	None	Gadadhar Sinha	Indian National Congress
Madhubani	None	Braj Behari Sharma	Indian National Congress
Govindganj	None	Sheodhari Pandey	Indian National Congress
Kesaria	None	Parvawati Gupta	Indian National Congress
Majorganj	None	Ram Dulari	Indian National Congress
Sheohar-cum-Belsand	None	Chulhai Dusadh	Indian National Congress
Sheohar-cum-Belsand	None	Thakur Girjanandan Singh	Indian National Congress
Sitamarhi South	None	Ram Sewak Saran	Independent
Sitamarhi West	None	Kuldip Narayan Yadav	Indian National Congress
Sitamarhi	None	Damodar Jha	Socialist Party
Ruinsaidpur	None	Viveka Nand Gir	Independent
Pupri South	None	Shyam Nandan Das Mahant	Indian National Congress
Pupri North	None	Doctor Habib	Indian National Congress
Sonbarsha Frontier	None	Tildhari Prasad Mahato	Independent
Sursand	None	Ram Charitra Rai Yadav	Independent
Sahebganj	None	Brajnandan Prasad Singh	Indian National Congress
Baruraj	None	Ram Chandra Prasad Sahi	Indian National Congress
Kanti	None	Jamuna Prasad Tripathy	Indian National Congress
Kurhani	None	Kapil Deo Narayan Singh	Indian National Congress
Mahua	None	Phudeni Prasad Sp	Indian National Congress
Paru North	None	Nawal Kishore Prasad Singh	Indian National Congress
Paru South	None	Harihar Saran Dutta	Indian National Congress
Lalganj	None	Chandramani Lal Choudhary	Indian National Congress
Lalganj	None	Laliteshwar Prasad Sahi	Indian National Congress
Hajipur	None	Saryug Prasad	Indian National Congress
Raghopur	None	Haribansh Narain Singh	Indian National Congress
Minapur	None	Janak Singh	Indian National Congress
Katra North	None	Mathura Prasad Singh	Indian National Congress
Katra South	None	Niteshwar Prasad Sinha	Indian National Congress
Muzaffarpur Town	None	Bindeshwari Prasad Verma	Indian National Congress
Muzaffarpur-cum-Sakra	None	Shio Nandan Ram	Indian National Congress
Muzaffarpur-cum-Sakra	None	Mahesh Prasad Sinha	Indian National Congress
Patepur	None	Nathuni Lal Mahato	Socialist Party
Mahnar	None	Deep Narayan Singh	Indian National Congress
Jale	None	Abdul Sami Nadavi	Indian National Congress
Mohiuddinnagar	None	Ramrup Prasad Rai	Indian National Congress
Tajpur	None	Karpoori Thakur	Socialist Party
Warisnagar	None	Dhanpati Paswan	Socialist Party
Warisnagar	None	Bashishtha Narain Singh	Socialist Party
Samastipur	None	Yadunandan Sahai	Indian National Congress
Samastipur	None	Sunder Mahato	Indian National Congress
Dalsingsarai East	None	Sahdeo Mahato	Indian National Congress
Dalsingsarai West	None	Devaki Nandan Jha	Indian National Congress
Rosera	None	Baleshwar Ram Inc	Indian National Congress
Darbhanga	None	Sayeedul Haque	Indian National Congress
Darbhanga North	None	Hirdaya Narayan Choudhary	Indian National Congress
Durbhanga South	None	Radha Kant Choudhary	Indian National Congress
Durbhanga South	None	Babuay Lal Mahato	Indian National Congress
Benipatti West	None	Shafi	Indian National Congress
Benipatti East	None	Subodh Narayan Yadav	Independent
Biraul	None	Deva Chandra Mishra	Indian National Congress
Bahera South	None	Krishna Devi	Indian National Congress
Bahera North	None	Jai Narayan Vineet Jha	Indian National Congress
Bahera North East	None	Narendra Nath Das	Indian National Congress
Singhia	None	Gajendra Narain Singh	Indian National Congress
Madhaipur	None	Janki Nandan Singh	Indian National Congress
Harlakhi	None	Janak Kishore Devi	Indian National Congress
Jainagar	None	Mahabal Kumar	Indian National Congress
Khajauli	None	Ahmad Sakoor	Indian National Congress
Iadania	None	Deo Narayan Yadav	Indian National Congress
Madhubani	None	Ram Krishna Mahato	Independent
Madhubani	None	Hari Nath Misra	Indian National Congress
Jhanjharpur	None	Kapileshwar Shastri	Indian National Congress
Laukaha	None	Yogeshwar Ghosh Yadav	Indian National Congress
Phulparas	None	Kashinath Mishra	Indian National Congress
Kharagpur	None	Shri Krishna Sinha	Indian National Congress
Tarapur	None	Basukinath Rai	Indian National Congress
Jamalpur Town	None	Jogendra Mahato	Indian National Congress
Monghyr Town	None	Nirapad Mukherjee	Indian National Congress
Suraj Garha-cum-Lakhisarai	None	Rajeshwar Prasad Singh	Indian National Congress
Suraj Garha-cum-Lakhisarai	None	Bhagwat Prasad	Indian National Congress
Jhajha	None	Chandrashekhar Singh	Indian National Congress
Lakchmipur-cum-Jamui	None	Guru Chamar Inc	Indian National Congress
Barbigha	None	Krishna Mohan Pearey Singh	Indian National Congress
Sheikhpura-cum-Sikandara	None	Shah Mustaque Saheb	Indian National Congress
Sheikhpura-cum-Sikandara	None	Raghunandan Prasad	Indian National Congress
Bariyarpur	None	Ramnarayan Choudhary	Socialist Party
Bachhwara	None	Mithan Choudhary	Indian National Congress
Teghra	None	Ram Charitra Sinha	Indian National Congress
Begusarai North	None	Md. Ilyas	Indian National Congress
Begusarai South	None	Saryoo Prasad Singh	Indian National Congress
Bakhri	None	Shivbrat Narain Sinha	Indian National Congress
Ballia	None	Brahma Deo Narain Sinha	Indian National Congress
Khagaria	None	Dwarika Prasad	Indian National Congress
Bakhtiarpur-cum-Chautham	None	Mishri Mushar	Indian National Congress
Bakhtiarpur-cum-Chautham	None	Jiyalal Mandal	Indian National Congress
Gogri	None	Suraj Narain Singh	Socialist Party
Parbatta	None	Kumar Tribeni Kumar	Socialist Party
Nirmali	None	Kamta Prasad Gupta	Indian National Congress
Pratapganj	None	Kublal Mahato	Indian National Congress
Supaul	None	Lahton Choudhary	Indian National Congress
Tribeniganj-cum-Madhipura	None	Bholi Shardar	Indian National Congress
Tribeniganj-cum-Madhipura	None	Bindeshwari Prasad Mandal	Indian National Congress
Dharhara	None	Ramesh Jha	Socialist Party
Sawarbazar-cum-Sonbarsa	None	Jageshwar Hazara	Indian National Congress
Sawarbazar-cum-Sonbarsa	None	Upendra Narain Singh	Indian National Congress
Murliganj	None	Shibnandan Prasad Mandal	Indian National Congress
Kishanganj	None	Kamleshwari Prasad Yadav	Indian National Congress
Alamnagar	None	Tanuk Lal Yadav	Socialist Party
Naugachia-cum-Bihpur	None	Kumar Raghunandan Prasad	Indian National Congress
Kahalgaon	None	Ramjanam Mahton	Indian National Congress
Bhagalpur Town	None	Satendra Narain Agrawal	Indian National Congress
Bhagalpur Muffasil	None	Syed Maqbool Ahmad	Indian National Congress
Sultanganj	None	Rash Bihari Lal	Indian National Congress
Dhuraia-cum-Amarpur	None	Pashupati Singh	Indian National Congress
Dhuraia-cum-Amarpur	None	Bhola Nath Das	Indian National Congress
Banka	None	Raghwendra Narain Singh	Indian National Congress
Belhar-cum-Katoria	None	Piroo Manjhi	Indian National Congress
Belhar-cum-Katoria	None	Shital Prasad Bhagat	Indian National Congress
Pirpanti	None	Siaram Singh	Indian National Congress
Narpatganj-cum-Dharhara	None	Dumar Lal Baitha	Indian National Congress
Narpatganj-cum-Dharhara	None	Ram Narain Mandal	Indian National Congress
Demdaha-cum-Korha	None	Lakshmi Narain Sudhansu	Indian National Congress
Demdaha-cum-Korha	None	Bhola Paswan	Indian National Congress
Rupauli	None	Mohit Lal Pandit	Socialist Party
Thakurganj	None	Anath Kanta Basu	Indian National Congress
Islampur	None	Chowdhary Mohamad Afaque	Indian National Congress
Kishanganj	None	Rautmal Agrawal	Indian National Congress
Bahadurganj	None	Ahsan Mohammad	Indian National Congress
Karandighi	None	Mohinuddin Mokhtar	Indian National Congress
Kadwa	None	Jiwats Himansu Sharma	Indian National Congress
Forbesganj	None	Bokai Mandal	Indian National Congress
Palasi	None	Punyanand Jha	Indian National Congress
Araria	None	Ziaur Rahman Hazi	Independent
Amour	None	Mohammad Tahir	Indian National Congress
Baisi	ST	Abdul Ahad Mohammad Noor	Indian National Congress
Purnia	None	Kamal Deo Narain Sinha	Indian National Congress
Katihar-cum-Barari	None	Sukhdeo Narain Singh	Indian National Congress
Katihar-cum-Barari	None	Babulal Manjhi	Indian National Congress
Azamnagar	None	Parbati Devi	Indian National Congress
Rajmahal Damin	None	Jetha Kisku	Jharkhand Party
Pakaur Damin	ST	Ram Charan Kisku	Jharkhand Party
Godda Damin	ST	Babulal Tuddu	Jharkhand Party
Mahagama	None	Sagar Mohan Pathak	Indian National Congress
Godda	None	Budhinath Kairav Jha	Indian National Congress
Poreyahat-cum-Jarmundi	None	Chunka Hembrom	Jharkhand Party
Poreyahat-cum-Jarmundi	None	Jagdish Narain Mandal	Indian National Congress
Ramgarh	ST	Suapi Murmu	Jharkhand Party
Dumka	ST	Devi Soren	Jharkhand Party
Jamtara	None	Satrughan Besra	Jharkhand Party
Masalia	ST	Madan Besra	Jharkhand Party
Sikaripara	ST	William Hembrom	Jharkhand Party
Maheshpur	ST	Jittu Kisku	Jharkhand Party
Pakur	None	Jotirmoyee Devi	Indian National Congress
Rajmahal	ST	Md. Burhanuddin Khan	Indian National Congress
Deoghar	None	Bhubneshwar Pandey	Forward Bloc
Madhupur-cum-Sarath	None	Janaki Prasad Singh	Indian National Congress
Madhupur-cum-Sarath	None	Gokul Mahara	Jharkhand Party
Narainpur	None	Krishna Gopal Das	Independent
Jamui-cum-Gawan	None	Sadanand Prasad	Indian National Congress
Jamui-cum-Gawan	None	Kisan Ram Das	Indian National Congress
Kodarma	None	Awadh Bihari Dikshit	Indian National Congress
Dhanwar	None	Punit Rai	Indian National Congress
Giridh-cum-Dumri	None	Krishnaballabh Sahai	Indian National Congress
Giridh-cum-Dumri	None	Lakshman Manjhi	Indian National Congress
Bagodar	None	Kamakhya Narain Singh	Chota Nagpur Santhal Parganas Janata Party
Patarbar	None	Kamakhya Narain Singh	Chota Nagpur Santhal Parganas Janata Party
Gomia	None	Kamakhya Narain Singh	Chota Nagpur Santhal Parganas Janata Party
Ramgarh-cum-Hazaribagh	None	Bigan Ram	Chota Nagpur Santhal Parganas Janata Party
Ramgarh-cum-Hazaribagh	None	Basant Narain Singh	Chota Nagpur Santhal Parganas Janata Party
Barhi	None	Rameshwar Prasad Mahato	Chota Nagpur Santhal Parganas Janata Party
Chauparan	None	Gauri Charan Singh	Chota Nagpur Santhal Parganas Janata Party
Barkagaon	None	Kamakhya Narain Singh	Chota Nagpur Santhal Parganas Janata Party
Chatra	None	Sukhlal Singh	Indian National Congress
Mandar	ST	Soma Bhagat	Indian National Congress
Silli	None	Bhola Nath Bhagat	Indian National Congress
Ranchi	None	Paul Dayal	Indian National Congress
Sonahatu	None	Jagannath Mahto Kurmi	Jharkhand Party
Tamar	ST	Naiyaran Munda	Jharkhand Party
Bero	ST	Harman Lakra	Jharkhand Party
Gumla	ST	Shukra Uraon	Jharkhand Party
Basia	None	Junas Soren	Jharkhand Party
Khunti	ST	Lucas Munda	Jharkhand Party
Kolebira	ST	S. K. Bage	Jharkhand Party
Simdega	ST	Alfred Uraon	Jharkhand Party
Chainpur	ST	Deocharan Manjhi	Chota Nagpur Santhal Parganas Janata Party
Sisai	ST	Baliya Bhagat	Jharkhand Party
Lohardaga	None	Ignas Kujur	Jharkhand Party
Hussainbad-cum-Garhwa	None	Raj Kishore Sinha	Indian National Congress
Hussainbad-cum-Garhwa	None	Deochanda Ram Pasi	Indian National Congress
Nagar Untari	None	Rajeshwari Saroj Das	Indian National Congress
Daltonganj	None	Amiya Kumar Gosh	Indian National Congress
Leslieganj-cum-Chhatarpur	None	Jitoo Ram	Indian National Congress
Leslieganj-cum-Chhatarpur	None	Bhuneshwar Choubey	Indian National Congress
Lateher-cum-Manatu	None	Girijanandan Singh	Indian National Congress
Lateher-cum-Manatu	None	Bhagirathi Singh	Indian National Congress
Topchanchi	None	Purnendu Narain Singh	Chota Nagpur Santhal Parganas Janata Party
Katras	None	Manorma Sinha	Independent
Tundi-cum-Nirsa	None	Ram Narayan Sharma	Indian National Congress
Tundi-cum-Nirsa	None	Tika Ram Manjhi	Indian National Congress
Dhanbad	None	Purushotam Chouhan	Indian National Congress
Baliapur	None	Kali Prasad Singh	Chota Nagpur Santhal Parganas Janata Party
Kashipur-cum-Raghunathpur	None	Budhan Manjhi	Indian National Congress
Kashipur-cum-Raghunathpur	None	Annada Prasad Chakrabarty	Independent
Para-cum-Chas	None	Sarat Mochi	Indian National Congress
Para-cum-Chas	None	Deoshankari Prasad Singh	Independent
Jhalda	None	Debendra Nath Mahata	Indian National Congress
Baghmundi	None	Sirish Chandra Banerjee	Lok Sewak Sangh
Purulia-cum-Hura	None	Dimo Charmahar	Lok Sewak Sangh
Purulia-cum-Hura	None	Samarendra Nath Ojha	Lok Sewak Sangh
Manbazar-cum-Patamda	None	Nitai Singh Sardar	Lok Sewak Sangh
Manbazar-cum-Patamda	None	Satya Kinkar Mahata	Lok Sewak Sangh
Barabazar-cum-Chandil	None	Bhimchandra Mahato	Lok Sewak Sangh
Barabazar-cum-Chandil	None	Atul Chandra Singh Bhuiya	Lok Sewak Sangh
Manoharpur	ST	Subha Nath Deogam	Jharkhand Party
Chakradharpur	ST	Sukhdeo Manjhi	Jharkhand Party
Kolhan	ST	Sidhu Hembrom	Jharkhand Party
Jamda	ST	Aukuro Ho	Jharkhand Party
Manjari	ST	Surendra Nath Birua	Jharkhand Party
Kharsawan	ST	Ujindra Lal Ho	Jharkhand Party
Seraikella	None	Mihir Kavi	Ganatantra Parishad
Jamshedpur	None	Sheo Chandrika Prasad	Indian National Congress
Jugsalai-cum-Potka	None	Kailash Prasad	Jharkhand Party
Jugsalai-cum-Potka	None	Haripada Singh	Jharkhand Party
Ghatsila-cum-Baharagora	None	Ghani Ram Santhal	Jharkhand Party
Ghatsila-cum-Baharagora	None	Mukunda Ram Tenty	Jharkhand Party

== State Reorganization ==
Bihar was reduced slightly by the transfer of minor territories to West Bengal in 1956 under States Reorganisation Act, 1956. Hence the constituencies were reduced from 330 in 1951 to 318 in 1957 elections.

== See also ==
- 1951–52 elections in India
- 1957 Bihar Legislative Assembly election
