= Ghorasahan Assembly constituency =

Coordinates: 26°54′18″N 84°54′16″E

Ghorasahan
- Former constituency for the Bihar Legislative Assembly

Constituency details
- Country: India
- Region: East India
- State: Bihar
- District: Purvi Champaran
- Lok Sabha constituency: Sheohar
- Established: 1951
- Abolished: 2010

Ghorasahan Assembly constituency is an assembly constituency in Purvi Champaran district in the Indian state of Bihar. The railway station is under Sonpur division. It is under Dhaka subdivision and under Dhaka court jurisdiction. It depends on Dhaka town for its requirements.

== Overview ==
It is part of Sheohar Lok Sabha constituency.

As a consequence of the orders of the Delimitation Commission of India, Ghorasahan Assembly constituency ceased to exist in 2010.

== Members of Vidhan Sabha ==
Year	Member	Party
1952		
1957	Mangal Prasad Yadav	Indian National Congress
1962	Rajendra Pratap Singh	Indian National Congress
1967	Ram Ayodhya Prasad	Praja Socialist Party
1969	Rajendra Pratap Singh	Indian National Congress
1972	Rajendra Pratap Singh	Indian National Congress
1977	Rajendra Pratap Singh	Indian National Congress
1980	Rajendra Pratap Singh	Indian National Congress (I)
1985	Pramod Kumar Singh	Indian National Congress
1990	Lal Babu Prasad	Janata Dal
1995	Lal Babu Prasad	Janata Dal
2000	Laxmi Narayan Yadav	Janata Dal (United)
2005	Laxmi Narayan Yadav	Rashtriya Janata Dal
2005	Laxmi Narayan Yadav	Rashtriya Janata Dal
2010 onwards: Constituency does not exist
