= Ramdeo Singh =

Indian politician

Member of Parliament, Lok Sabha
- In office 1971–1980
- Preceded by: M. P. Singh
- Succeeded by: Krishan Pratap Singh
- Constituency: Maharajganj

Personal details
- Born: 12 December 1916
- Party: Janata Party
- Other political affiliations: Samyukta Socialist Party
- Spouse: Salehra Devi

Ramdeo Singh was an Indian politician. He was elected to the Lok Sabha, the lower house of the Parliament of India, as a member of the Janata Party.
