= Maha Nand Singh =

Indian politician

Maha Nand Singh Kushwaha
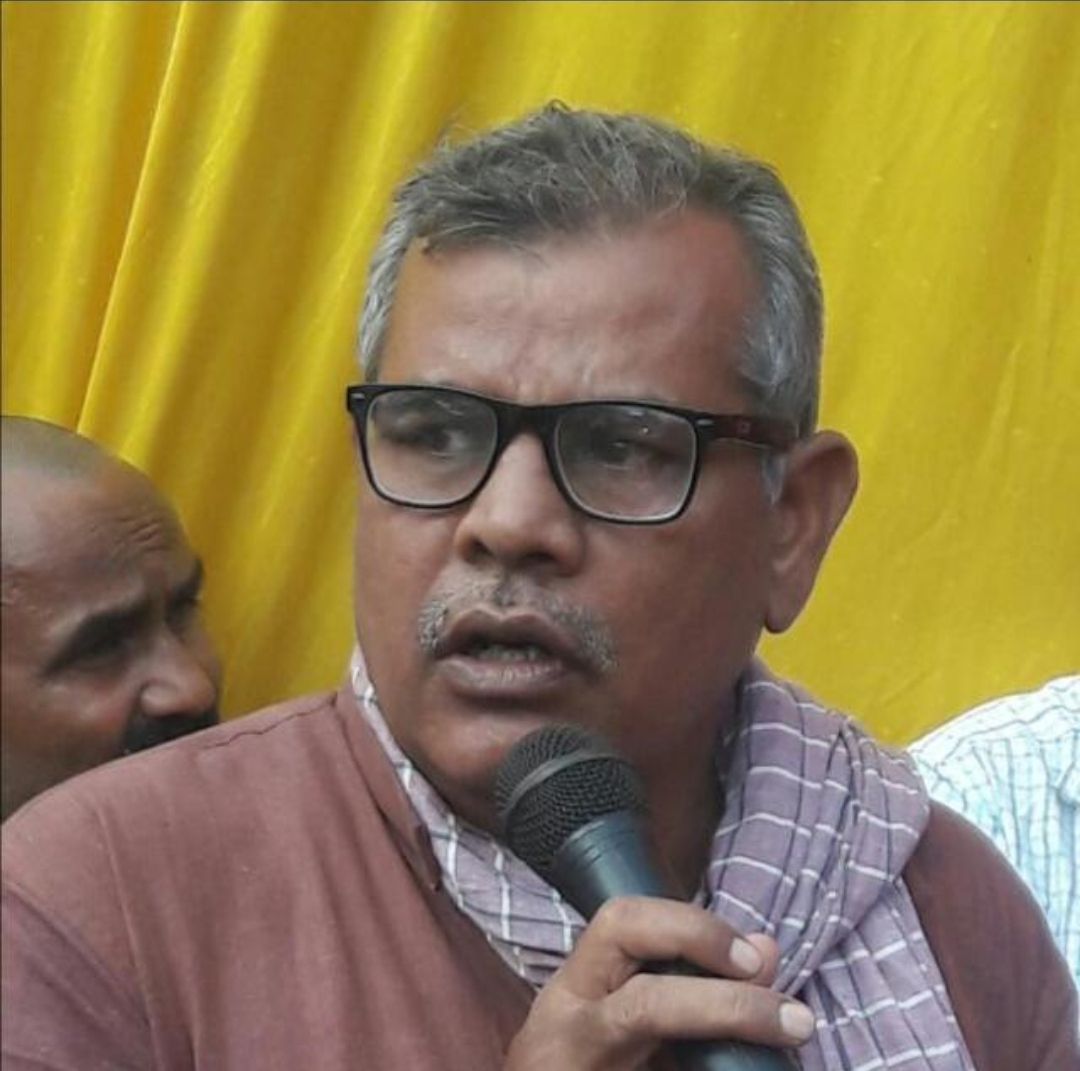

Bihar Legislative Assembly
- In office 2020–2025
- Preceded by: Ravindra Singh Kushwaha
- Succeeded by: Manoj Kumar Singh
- Constituency: Arwal

Personal details
- Born: 02.11.1964 Kauri, Paliganj, Patna
- Party: CPI(M–L)L
- Occupation: Politics

Maha Nand Singh is an Indian politician from Bihar and a Member of the Bihar Legislative Assembly. Maha Nand Singh won the Arwal Assembly constituency on the CPI(M–L)L ticket in the 2020 Bihar Legislative Assembly election.

== Political career ==
Singh contested from the Arwal assembly constituency in 2010 Bihar assembly elections as well, but was defeated by Chitranjan Kumar of Bhartiya Janata Party. In 2015 assembly elections in the constituency, the Rashtriya Janata Dal (RJD) candidate, Ravindra Kumar Singh defeated sitting Member of Legislative Assembly, Chitranjan Kumar. In 2020 assembly elections, RJD, which was contesting in alliance with Communist Party of India (Marxist-Leninist) Liberation, passed this assembly constituency to latter. Hence, Singh was made a candidate from the constituency, which contained sizeable population of Kushwahas.

In 2010 assembly elections, despite the coalition of Bhartiya Janata Party and Janata Dal (United), which was contesting against him in Arwal, he was defeated by a small margin of 4200 votes by Chitranjan Kumar. In 2020, Kumar was barred by party (BJP) from entering the constituency and not given ticket to contest. In place of Kumar, the Bhartiya Janata Party made Deepak Sharma as their candidate. The sitting Member of Legislative Assembly Ravindra Kumar Singh (who won as a candidate of RJD in 2015) was also not given ticket by the RJD to contest, as the RJD had passed this assembly seat to the ally CPI (ML)L. As a result of the new political equation, Singh was able to defeat BJP candidate, Deepak Sharma with a good margin of votes. In this election, Rashtriya Lok Samata Party had placed Subhas Chandra Yadav as their candidate, but he was not able to corner the Yadav votes.

== Activism ==
Singh was also involved in activism for the cause of weaker section of society. During his membership of Bihar Legislative Assembly, in 2021, a land grab incident happened in Nawada. In this particular incident, a local goon and strongman Admani Singh forcibly seized the land of agricultural labour Jageshwar Manjhi. On protesting against this forcible land grab, the family of Manjhi was brutally attacked by the goons of Admani Singh. There was also an attempt to rape the fourteen years old granddaughter of Jageshwar Manjhi by Admani Singh's men. Singh was the head of CPI (ML)L's state committee, which visited the Khushiyal Bigha village of Nawada, where this incident happened.

In 2022, he had also raised voice against the drinking water and irrigation related problems in his constituency.
