= Krishan Pratap Singh =

Indian politician

Member of Parliament, Lok Sabha
- In office 1980–1989
- Preceded by: Ramdeo Singh
- Succeeded by: Chandra Shekhar
- Constituency: Maharajganj

Personal details
- Born: 1942 (age 83–84)
- Party: Indian National Congress
- Spouse: Rambha Singh

Krishan Pratap Singh is an Indian politician. He was elected to the Lok Sabha, the lower house of the Parliament of India, as a member of the Indian National Congress.
