= Kaushalendra Pratap Shahi =

Indian politician (c.1916–2019)

Bihar Legislative Assembly
- In office 1967–1969
- Preceded by: Umashankar Prasad
- Succeeded by: Mahamaya Prasad Sinha
- Constituency: Maharajganj

Personal details
- Born: c. 1916
- Died: 17 December 2019 (aged 103)
- Party: Praja Socialist Party

Kaushalendra Pratap Shahi (c. 1930– 17 December 2019) was an Indian politician from Bihar. He was a legislator of the Bihar Legislative Assembly. His maternal home is in chhittraur Begusarai, in raisaheb family.

== Biography ==
Shahi was elected as a legislator of the Bihar Legislative Assembly from Maharajganj as a Praja Socialist Party candidate in 1967.

Shahi died on 17 December 2019 at the age of 103.
