= Goh Assembly constituency =

Assembly constituency in Bihar, India

Coordinates: 24.98°N 84.65°E

- Constituency No. 219 for the Bihar Legislative Assembly

Constituency details
- Country: India
- Region: East India
- State: Bihar
- District: Aurangabad
- Lok Sabha constituency: Karakat (Lok Sabha constituency)
- Established: 1951
- Total electors: 313,574

Member of Legislative Assembly
- 18th Bihar Legislative Assembly
- Incumbent Amrendra Kushwaha
- Party: RJD
- Alliance: MGB
- Elected year: 2025

Goh Assembly constituency is an assembly constituency for Bihar Legislative Assembly in Aurangabad district, Bihar. It comes under Karakat (Lok Sabha constituency).

== Members of the Legislative Assembly ==
Year	Name	Party
1952	Mundrika Singh	Socialist Party
1962	Munishwar Nath Singh	Indian National Congress
1967	Munishwar Nath Singh	Indian National Congress
1969	Awadh Singh	Samyukta Socialist Party
1972	Munishwar Nath Singh	Indian National Congress
1977	Ram Saran Yadav	Communist Party of India
1980	Ram Saran Yadav	Communist Party of India
1985	Deo Kumar Sharma	Indian National Congress
1990	Ram Saran Yadav	Communist Party of India
1995	Ram Saran Yadav	Communist Party of India
2000	Deo Kumar Sharma	Samata Party
2005	Ranvijay Kumar	Janata Dal (United)
2005	Ranvijay Kumar	Janata Dal (United)
2010	Ranvijay Kumar	Janata Dal (United)
2015	Manoj Kumar Sharma	Bharatiya Janata Party
2020	Bhim Kumar Singh	Rashtriya Janata Dal
2025	Amrendra Kumar	Rashtriya Janata Dal

== Election results ==
=== 2025 ===
Bihar Assembly election, 2025: Goh
Party	Candidate	Votes	%	±%
RJD	Amrendra Kumar	93,624	44.23	+0.16
BJP	Dr. Ranvijay Kumar	89,583	42.32	+17.53
JSP	Sitaram Dukhari	7,996	3.78	
ASP(KR)	Md Eklakha	6,631	3.13	
Independent	Shiv Shanker Singh	3,115	1.47	
BSP	Sanjay Prasad Alias Er. Sanjay Prasad Kushwaha	1,946	0.92	
NOTA	None of the above	4,649	2.2	+1.3
Majority		4,041	1.91	−17.37
Turnout		211,669	67.5	+7.66
RJD hold		Swing		

=== 2020 ===
Bihar Assembly election, 2020: Goh
Party	Candidate	Votes	%	±%
RJD	Bhim Kumar Singh	81,410	44.07	
BJP	Manoj Kumar	45,792	24.79	−10.26
RLSP	Dr. Ranvijay Kumar	44,050	23.85	
Independent	Rajesh Kumar, Son Of Madan Singh	3,067	1.66	
Independent	Sreekant Sharma	1,678	0.91	
NOTA	None of the above	1,663	0.9	+0.25
Majority		35,618	19.28	+14.26
Turnout		184,728	59.84	+5.8
RJD gain from BJP		Swing		

=== 2015 ===
2015 Bihar Legislative Assembly election: Goh
Party	Candidate	Votes	%	±%
BJP	Manoj Kumar	53,615	35.05	
JD(U)	Doctor Ranvijay Kumar	45,943	30.03	
CPI	Suresh Prasad Yadav	18,951	12.39	
BSP	Akshay Kumar	6,743	4.41	
SS	Ranvijay Kumar	5,240	3.43	
SP	Ram Ayodhya Prasad Yadav	4,235	2.77	
Independent	Dudhamohan Yadav	1,635	1.07	
Independent	Sanjeet Kumar	1,621	1.06	
Sarvajan Kalyan Loktantrik Party	Md. Ekalakh Khan	1,563	1.02	
Independent	Awadhesh Kumar	1,561	1.02	
Independent	Rajesh Kumar (Jalpura)	1,484	0.97	
Independent	Chitranjan Sharma	1,407	0.92	
NOTA	None of the above	989	0.65	
Majority		7,672	5.02	
Turnout		152,977	54.04	
