= Amrendra Kushwaha =

Indian politician

Member of the Bihar Legislative Assembly
- Incumbent
- Assumed office 14 November 2025
- Preceded by: Bheem Kumar Yadav
- Constituency: Goh Assembly constituency

Personal details
- Party: Rashtriya Janata Dal
- Profession: Politician

Amrendra Kushwaha is an Indian politician and a member of Rashtriya Janata Dal political party based in Indian state of Bihar. He was the district unit president of Rashtriya Janata Dal for Aurangabad district. In 2025, he was fielded as the candidate of RJD from Goh Assembly constituency of Aurangabad district and emerged victorious. He is currently serving as member of Bihar Legislative Assembly.

== Political career ==
He contested his first legislative assembly election in 2025 on the symbol of Rashtriya Janata Dal. On 14 November 2025, after the final counting of votes, he was declared winner. He defeated his nearest political rival Ranvijay Kumar of Bharatiya Janata Party to become an MLA for the first time, after serving as RJD's district unit president for Aurangabad for a long time.

== See also ==
- Binita Mehta
