= Yashwant Kumar Choudhary =

Indian Politician

Yashwant Kumar Choudhary was a member of the Bihar Legislative Assembly, representing Dalsinghsarai, Bihar. He won the constituency for the Swatantra Party in 1967 and 1969 and for the Janata Party in 1977. The 1967 result abbreviates the winner as “Y.K. Chaudhary”; his identity is supported by the exact constituency and party, and by the contemporaneous party record naming Shri Yashwant Kumar Choudhary as an MLA in July 1967. He led the Swatantra legislative group in Bihar and was listed as chairman of the party's Bihar unit in its 1974–1975 directory.

== Electoral career ==
In 1967, Shri Yashwant Kumar Choudhary won Dalsinghsarai for Swatantra. He received 16,292 votes against 7,398 for Congress’s Shri A.B. Nazari, a margin of 8,894. The 1967 result abbreviates the winner as “Y.K. Chaudhary”, and the constituency is wrongly referenced as "Balsinghsarai" instead of "Dalsinghsarai", which could have arisen since these details were manually digitised from hard-copy records. His identity is supported by the exact constituency and party, and the contemporaneous party record naming Shri Yashwant Kumar Choudhary as an MLA in July 1967. The mandate gave him a place in the Bihar Legislative Assembly and a stronger platform for public work. Two years later, he won again as Swatantra’s candidate in Dalsinghsarai. His 15,462 votes placed him ahead of Congress’s Shri Rameshwar Singh, who received 12,956. A majority of 2,506 renewed his mandate.

In 1972, he contested Dalsinghsarai for Swatantra. He received 17,562 votes against 28,536 for Congress’s Shri Jagdish Prasad Choudhary, losing by 10,974. Although his own vote total had increased since 1969, the seat changed hands.He remained engaged in the party’s future. At the General Council meeting in Bombay on 8–9 April 1972, he described his work in Bihar, visits to flood-affected areas, legislative activity and proposed campaigns on agricultural taxation and kerosene prices.The same contribution included allegations of booth capture and language advocating a response to violence with violence. These were political assertions and rhetoric, distinct from the official election result. Together with his continuing engagement, they place his contribution within the charged debates of the time.

In 1977, Shri Choudhary returned to victory as the Janata Party candidate in Dalsinghsarai, Constituency 98. He received 29,167 votes against 20,796 for Congress’s Shri Jagdish Prasad Choudhary, a majority of 8,371.

== Swatantra Party Activities ==
Shri Yashwant Kumar Choudhary started his political journey with Swatantra Party as a Bihar delegate at the party's Third National Convention, held on 1–2 February 1964. His participation in the party’s national organisation preceded the electoral mandates and leadership responsibilities that would make his public role more visible. In July, 1967, he joined a four-person ad hoc committee approved by Swatantra’s National Executive to rebuild the Bihar organisation after the earlier state committee’s dissolution. The committee could recommend five further members for co-option. This collective assignment reflected the confidence placed in him as both an elected representative and an organisational colleague.

After winning in 1969 in the Bihar Legislative Assembly elections, according to the draft minutes of its meeting on 16 February 1969, the Swatantra Party’s Central Parliamentary Board recommended Shri Yashwant Kumar Choudhary to lead the party’s group in the Bihar Legislative Assembly, citing “his continued loyalty to the Party through the years”. N. G. Ranga chaired the meeting; the other recorded attendees were Gayatri Devi of Jaipur, Lakshman Singh of Dungarpur, B. P. Singh, Dahyabhai V. Patel, R. C. Cooper, H. M. Patel and N. Dandeker. The April–May 1969 as the party's leader of the Bihar legislative group, Shri Choudhary explained on 23 February that Swatantra had not offered unconditional support to the Congress ministry. Cooperation should rest on programmes for “the welfare and upliftment of the masses”. His position combined a willingness to cooperate with a stated public purpose.

According to the party's June–July 1970 newsletter, the nucleus of a Kisan Sena was formed in Patna on 19 April 1970 at Shri Choudhary's initiative, with the stated aim of protecting Bihar's farmers. The newsletter also recorded him moving a resolution on the land-grab agitation, particularly that of small farmers, in Bihar at the General Council meeting of 21–22 July 1970. At Swatantra’s General Council meeting in Madras on 21–22 July 1970, he moved a resolution on the land-grab agitation in Bihar. Shri G. Swaminathan of Tamil Nadu seconded it. The resolutions were adopted unanimously after discussion. Shri Choudhary helped carry a state concern into a national forum and turn advocacy into a collective party position.

The 1974–1975 office directory listed him as Bihar chairman and as a permanent invitee to the National Executive under its heading for presidents of state units.
