= Hemnarayan Sah =

Indian politician

MLA, Bihar Legislative Assembly
- In office 2015–2020
- Preceded by: Damodar Singh
- Succeeded by: Vijay Shanker Dubey
- Constituency: Maharajganj

Personal details
- Born: 1 November 1960 (age 65) Kashdewra Pokhra, Maharajganj, Siwan
- Party: Janta Dal United JDU (From 2013)
- Spouse: Badami Devi
- Children: 04
- Education: Intermediate
- As of 10 November 2020

Hemnarayan Sah is an Indian politician and leader of Janta Dal United. He was the Member of the Bihar Legislative Assembly for Maharajganj between 2015 and 2020.

In the 2015 Bihar Legislative Assembly election, Sah won the Maharajganj seat with 68,459 votes, defeating BJP candidate Kumar Deo Ranjan Singh by a margin of 20,292 votes. In the 2020 election, he narrowly lost the seat to Indian National Congress candidate Vijay Shanker Dubey by a margin of 1,976 votes, receiving 46,849 votes. He regained the seat in the 2025 Bihar Legislative Assembly election, winning with 86,813 votes and a majority of 21,099 votes over RJD candidate Ashok Jaiswal.
