= Vijay Shanker Dubey =

Indian politician

MLA, Bihar Legislative Assembly
- In office 2020–2025
- Preceded by: Hemnarayan Sah
- Succeeded by: Hemnarayan Sah
- Constituency: Maharajganj

Personal details
- Born: 16 June 1948 (age 77)
- Party: INC
- Occupation: Politics

Vijay Shanker Dubey is an Indian politician from Bihar and a Member of the Bihar Legislative Assembly. Dubey won the Maharajganj Assembly constituency on INC ticket in the 2020 Bihar Legislative Assembly election.
