= Randhir Singh (cricketer) =

Indian cricketer (1957–2023)

Personal information
- Born: 16 August 1957; Delhi, India
- Died: 8 March 2023 (aged 65); Bokaro, Jharkhand, India
- Batting: Right-handed
- Bowling: Right-arm fast medium

Career statistics
Competition	ODI
Matches	2
Runs scored	–
Batting average	–
100s/50s	–
Top score	–
Balls bowled	72
Wickets	1
Bowling average	48.00
5 wickets in innings	0
10 wickets in match	0
Best bowling	1/30
Catches/stumpings	0/–
- Source: Cricinfo, 6 March 2006

Randhir Singh (16 August 1957 – 8 March 2023) was an Indian cricketer who played two One Day Internationals for India against England and West Indies in 1981 and 1983. He was born in Delhi and died in Jamshedpur, aged 65.
