= Kedar Nath Singh (Bihar politician) =

Indian politician

Member of Bihar Legislative Assembly
- Incumbent
- Assumed office 2010
- Preceded by: Manoranjan Singh
- Constituency: Baniapur

Personal details
- Born: 1 January 1969 (age 57)
- Party: BJP
- Parent: Vasudeo Singh
- Profession: Company Director & Petrol Pump

Kedar Nath Singh is an Indian politician, currently a member of Rashtriya Janata Dal and three time consecutive Member of Legislative Assembly (India) from Baniapur (Vidhan Sabha constituency). He is the brother of former Member of Parliament, Prabhunath Singh.

He has a few criminal charges against him, in one of them recently a charge sheet was filed against him.
