= Uma Shankar Singh (Bihar politician) =

Indian politician

Uma Shankar Singh (17 January 1940 – 24 January 2013) was an Indian politician. He was a member of the Indian Parliament and represented Maharajganj (Bihar) (Lok Sabha constituency). On 18 January 2013, he was admitted at the All India Institutes of Medical Sciences in New Delhi for treatment of cold, pneumonia and chest congestion. He never recovered and died from a lung infection on 24 January.
