= Ram Bahadur Singh =

Indian politician

Ram Bahadur Singh (10 March 1934 – 22 February 2006) was a leader of Samajwadi Janata Party (Rashtriya) (SJP). He came from the state of Bihar in India and served as member of the Lok Sabha, the lower house of the Parliament of India.

== Early life and education ==
Singh was born on 10 March 1934 in Harpur, Saran district, Bihar in a Zamindar family .He was married to Rajkumari Devi and had both a son Sanjay Kumar Singh and a daughter Rama Singh . He attended Rajendra College in Chhapra and had a BA degree.

== Political career ==
In 1949, Singh joined the Socialist Party and between 1967 and 1972 he was secretary of the Samyukta Socialist Party in his home district. He was elected to the Legislative Assembly of Bihar for the periods 1967–1968 and 1972–1974.

Singh was elected to the 8th Lok Sabha from the Chapra constituency and to the 9th and 11th Lok Sabhas from the Maharajganj constituency. He served briefly as a minister of state in the Department of Rural Development during the government led by Chandra Shekhar. He was a member of the Janata Dal party around this time.

Singh was general secretary of the SJP in 1983–1984 and principal general secretary from 1996. He spent three months in prison in 1964 for his participation in the Bhoomi Andolan and was detained under the provisions of the Maintenance of Internal Security Act (MISA) for a further three months in 1974 after he had been involved with an andolan led by Jai Prakash Narayan. He was also detained for around 15 months during the Emergency of 1975–76, again under the provisions of the MISA.

== Death ==
Singh died in hospital on 23 February 2006, soon after angioplasty. His wife had predeceased him.
