= Seventh Nitish Kumar ministry =

Government of Bihar, India (2020–22)

- 38th Ministry of Bihar
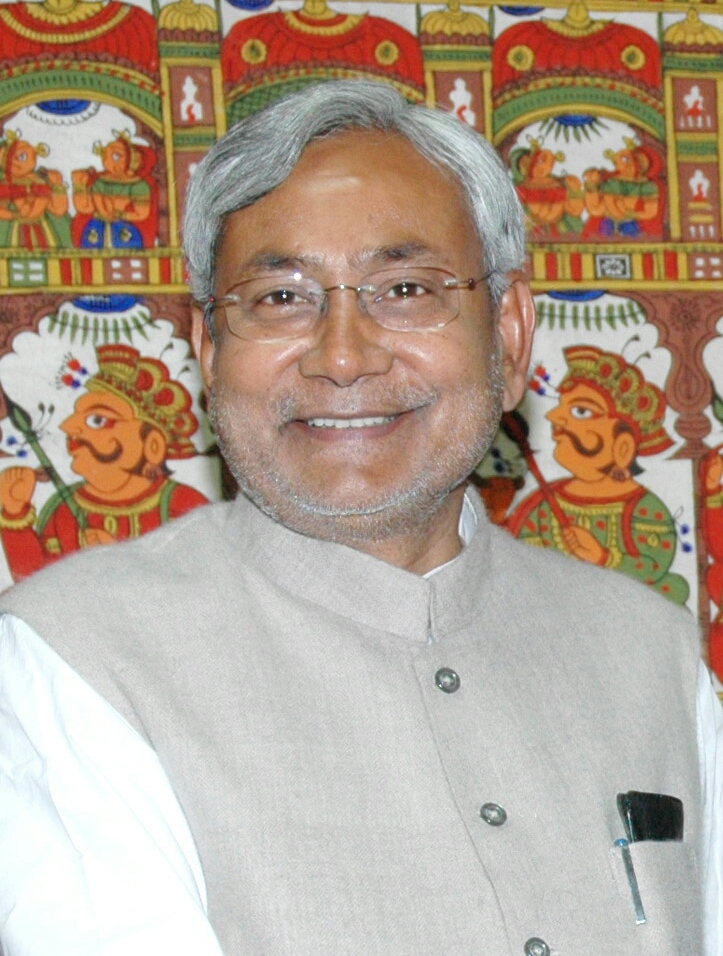
- Nitish Kumar; Chief Minister of Bihar
- Date formed: 16 November 2020
- Date dissolved: 9 August 2022

People and organisations
- Governor: Fagu Chauhan
- Chief Minister: Nitish Kumar
- No. of ministers: 30
- Ministers removed: 2
- Member parties: BJP (16); JDU (12); HAM (1); IND (1)
- Status in legislature: Coalition
- Opposition party: RJD
- Opposition leader: Tejashwi Yadav(assembly)

History
- Election: 2020
- Legislature terms: 1 year, 266 days
- Predecessor: Sixth Nitish ministry
- Successor: Eighth Nitish ministry

The Seventh Nitish Kumar ministry was a Council of Ministers in Bihar Legislative Assembly headed by Chief Minister Nitish Kumar.

== Council of Ministers ==
The members of the Council of Ministers are as follows:

Portfolio	Minister	Took office	Left office	Party
Chief Minister; Home; General Administration; Cabinet Secretariat; Vigilance; Election; Other departments not allocated to any Minister	Nitish Kumar	16 November 2020	9 August 2022	JD(U)
Deputy Chief Minister; Minister of Finance; Minister of Urban Development & Housing	Tarkishore Prasad	16 November 2020	9 August 2022	BJP
Minister of Disaster Management	Tarkishore Prasad	16 November 2020	9 February 2021	BJP
Minister of Disaster Management	Renu Devi	9 February 2021	9 August 2022	BJP
Minister of Environment & Forest	Tarkishore Prasad	16 November 2020	9 February 2021	BJP
Minister of Environment & Forest	Neeraj Kumar Singh	9 February 2021	9 August 2022	BJP
Minister of Information & Technology	Tarkishore Prasad	16 November 2020	9 February 2021	BJP
Minister of Information & Technology	Jibesh Mishra	9 February 2021	9 August 2022	BJP
Deputy Chief Minister; Minister of BC & EBC Welfare	Renu Devi	16 November 2020	9 August 2022	BJP
Minister of Industry	Renu Devi	16 November 2020	9 February 2021	BJP
Minister of Industry	Shahnawaz Hussain	9 February 2021	9 August 2022	BJP
Minister of Panchayat Raj	Renu Devi	16 November 2020	9 February 2021	BJP
Minister of Panchayat Raj	Samrat Chaudhary	9 February 2021	9 August 2022	BJP
Minister of Health	Mangal Pandey	16 November 2020	9 August 2022	BJP
Minister of Road Construction	Mangal Pandey	16 November 2020	9 February 2021	BJP
Minister of Road Construction	Nitin Nabin	9 February 2021	9 August 2022	BJP
Minister of Art, Culture & Youth Affairs	Mangal Pandey	16 November 2020	9 February 2021	BJP
Minister of Art, Culture & Youth Affairs	Alok Ranjan Jha	9 February 2021	9 August 2022	BJP
Minister of Agriculture	Amrendra Pratap Singh	16 November 2020	9 August 2022	BJP
Minister of Co-operative	Amrendra Pratap Singh	16 November 2020	9 February 2021	BJP
Minister of Co-operative	Subhash Singh	9 February 2021	9 August 2022	BJP
Minister of Sugar Cane Industries	Amrendra Pratap Singh	16 November 2020	9 February 2021	BJP
Minister of Sugar Cane Industries	Pramod Kumar	9 February 2021	9 August 2022	BJP
Minister of Animal Husbandry & Fisheries	Mukesh Sahani	16 November 2020	27 March 2022	VIP
Minister of Animal Husbandry & Fisheries	Tarkishore Prasad	28 March 2022	9 August 2022	BJP
Minister of Minor Irrigation; Minister of SC-ST Welfare	Santosh Manjhi	16 November 2020	9 August 2022	HAM(S)
Minister of Building Construction
Minister of Building Construction	Ashok Choudhary	9 February 2021	9 August 2022	JD(U)
Minister of Social Welfare	Ashok Choudhary	16 November 2020	9 February 2021	JD(U)
Minister of Social Welfare	Madan Sahni	9 February 2021	9 August 2022	JD(U)
Minister of Minority Affairs	Ashok Choudhary	16 November 2020	9 February 2021	JD(U)
Minister of Minority Affairs	Mohd Zama Khan	9 February 2021	9 August 2022	JD(U)
Minister of Parliamentary Affairs	Vijay Chaudhary	16 November 2020	9 August 2022	JD(U)
Minister of Rural Development	Vijay Chaudhary	16 November 2020	9 February 2021	JD(U)
Minister of Rural Development	Shrawan Kumar	9 February 2021	9 August 2022	JD(U)
Minister of Rural Works	Vijay Chaudhary	16 November 2020	9 February 2021	JD(U)
Minister of Rural Works	Jayant Raj Kushwaha	9 February 2021	9 August 2022	JD(U)
Minister of Water Resources	Vijay Chaudhary	16 November 2020	9 February 2021	JD(U)
Minister of Water Resources	Sanjay Kumar Jha	9 February 2021	9 August 2022	JD(U)
Minister of Information & Public Relations	Vijay Chaudhary	16 November 2020	9 February 2021	JD(U)
Minister of Information & Public Relations	Sanjay Kumar Jha	9 February 2021	9 August 2022	JD(U)
Minister of Energy; Minister of Planning & Development	Bijendra Prasad Yadav	16 November 2020	9 August 2022	JD(U)
Minister of Food & Consumer Protection	Bijendra Prasad Yadav	16 November 2020	9 February 2021	JD(U)
Minister of Food & Consumer Protection	Leshi Singh	9 February 2021	9 August 2022	JD(U)
Minister of Education	Mewalal Chaudhary	16 November 2020	19 November 2020	JD(U)
Minister of Education	Vijay Chaudhary	9 February 2021	9 August 2022	JD(U)
Minister of Labour Resources	Jibesh Mishra	16 November 2020	9 August 2022	BJP
Minister of Tourism	Jibesh Mishra	16 November 2020	9 February 2021	BJP
Minister of Tourism	Narayan Prasad	9 February 2021	9 August 2022	BJP
Minister of Mines & Geology	Jibesh Mishra	16 November 2020	9 February 2021	BJP
Minister of Mines & Geology	Janak Ram	9 February 2021	9 August 2022	BJP
Minister of Public Health Engineering Department	Ram Prit Paswan	16 November 2020	9 August 2022	BJP
Minister of Revenue & Land Reforms	Ram Surat Rai	16 November 2020	9 August 2022	BJP
Minister of Law	Ram Surat Rai	16 November 2020	9 February 2021	BJP
Minister of Law	Pramod Kumar	9 February 2021	9 August 2022	BJP
Minister of Transport	Sheela Kumari	16 November 2020	9 August 2022	JD(U)
Minister of Excise & Registration; Minister of Prohibition	Sunil Kumar Singh	9 February 2021	9 August 2022	JD(U)
Minister of Science & Technology	Sumit Kumar Singh	9 February 2021	9 August 2022	Independent

== See also ==
- Government of Bihar
- Bihar Legislative Assembly
- List of science and technology ministers of Bihar
- Nitish Kumar second ministry
- Nitish Kumar fifth ministry (2015 - 2017)
