= Eighth Nitish Kumar ministry =

Government of Bihar, India (2022–24)

- 39th Ministry of Bihar
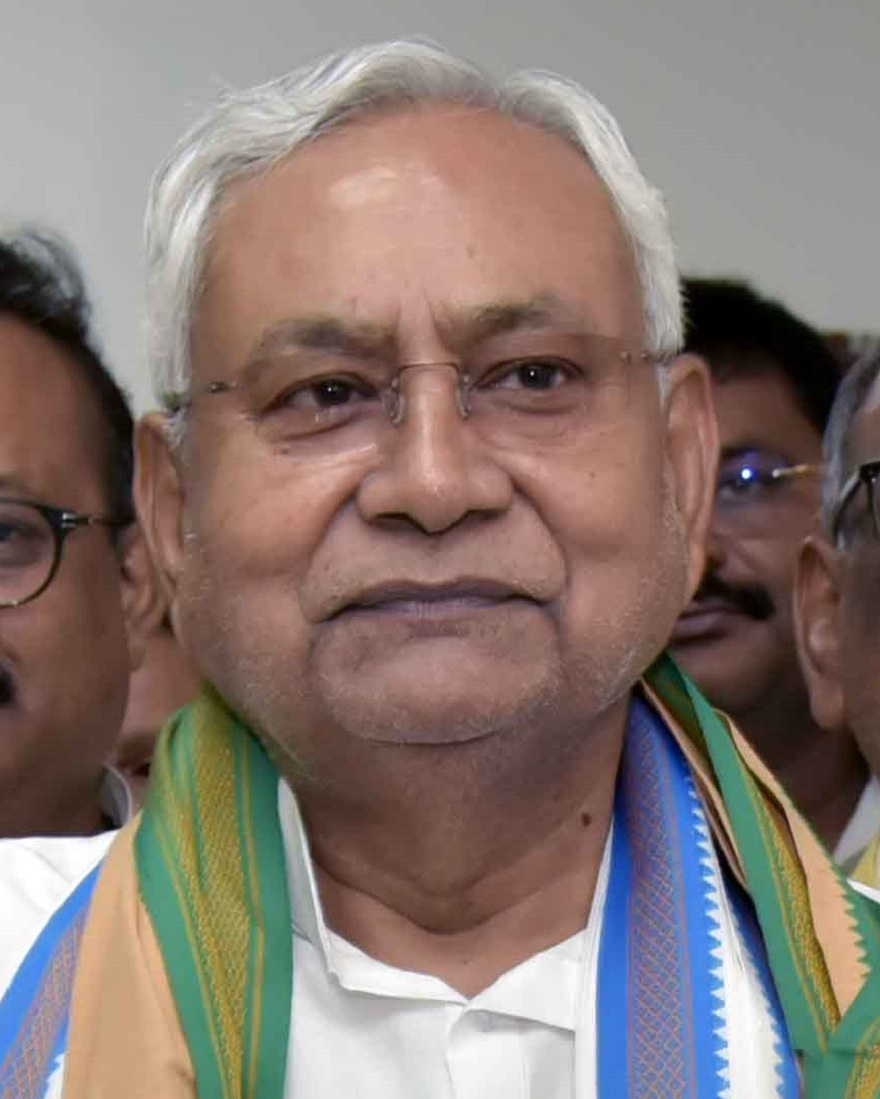
- Nitish Kumar; Hon'ble Chief Minister of Bihar
- Date formed: 10 August 2022
- Date dissolved: 28 January 2024

People and organisations
- Governor: Rajendra Vishwanath Arlekar
- Chief Minister: Nitish Kumar
- Deputy Chief Minister: Tejashwi Yadav
- No. of ministers: 31 (Including CM And Deputy CM)
- Member parties: RJD(14); JD(U)(12); INC(2); IND (1)
- Status in legislature: Coalition
- Opposition party: BJP
- Opposition leader: Vijay Kumar Sinha (Assembly); Hari Sahni (Council)

History
- Election: 2020
- Legislature terms: 1 year, 171 days
- Predecessor: Seventh Nitish ministry
- Successor: Ninth Nitish ministry

The Eighth Nitish Kumar ministry was the Council of Ministers in Bihar Legislative Assembly headed by Chief Minister Nitish Kumar. On 9 August 2022, he walked out of the BJP's NDA alliance and announced his resignation. He then decided to form a new government in Bihar along with the RJD and the Congress. Though Nitish Kumar from Janata Dal (United) is the Chief Minister of this government, Rashtriya Janata Dal was the largest party in this alliance. On 28 January 2024, he walked out of the INDIA (alliance) and announced his resignation. He then decided to form a new government in Bihar along with the BJP's NDA alliance.

== Council of Ministers ==
Portfolio	Minister	Took office	Left office	Party	Ref
Chief Minister: Home; General Administration; Cabinet Secretariat; Vigilance; Election; (Other departments not allocated to any Minister.)	Nitish Kumar	10 August 2022	28 January 2024	JD(U)	
Deputy Chief Minister: Minister of Health & Family Welfare; Road Construction; Housing & Urban Development; Rural works; Tourism	Tejashwi Yadav	10 August 2022	28 January 2024	RJD	
Environment, Forest and Climate change	Tej Pratap Yadav	16 August 2022	28 January 2024	RJD	
Law	Kartik Kumar	16 August 2022	30 August 2022	RJD	
Law	Shamim Ahmad	30 August 2022	28 January 2024	RJD	
Sugar Cane Industries	Shamim Ahmad	16 August 2022	30 August 2022	RJD	
Sugar Cane Industries	Kartik Kumar	30 August 2022	31 August 2022	RJD	
Sugar Cane Industries	Alok Kumar Mehta	31 August 2022	20 January 2024	RJD	
Sugar Cane Industries	Chandrashekhar Yadav	20 January 2024	28 January 2024	RJD	
Revenue and Land reforms	Alok Kumar Mehta	16 August 2022	20 January 2024	RJD	
Revenue and Land reforms	Lalit Kumar Yadav	20 January 2024	28 January 2024	RJD	
Agriculture	Sudhakar Singh	16 August 2022	2 October 2022	RJD	
Agriculture	Kumar Sarvjeet	2 October 2022	28 January 2024	RJD	
Tourism	Kumar Sarvjeet	16 August 2022	2 October 2022	RJD	
Tourism	Tejashwi Yadav	2 October 2022	28 January 2024	RJD	
BC & EBC Welfare	Anita Devi	16 August 2022	28 January 2024	RJD	
Co-operative	Surendra Prasad Yadav	16 August 2022	28 January 2024	RJD	
Education	Chandrashekhar Yadav	16 August 2022	20 January 2024	RJD	
Education	Alok Kumar Mehta	20 January 2024	28 January 2024	RJD	
Public Health Engineering department	Lalit Kumar Yadav	16 August 2022	28 January 2024	RJD	
Art, Culture & Youth Affairs	Jitendra Kumar Ray	16 August 2022	28 January 2024	RJD	
Sports	Jitendra Kumar Ray	10 January 2024	28 January 2024	RJD	
Mines and Geology	Ramanand Yadav	16 August 2022	28 January 2024	RJD	
Labour resources	Surendra Ram	16 August 2022	28 January 2024	RJD	
Disaster Management	Mohammed Shahnawaz Alam	16 August 2022	28 January 2024	RJD	
Information Technology	Mohammad Israil Mansuri	16 August 2022	28 January 2024	RJD	
Industries	Samir Kumar Mahaseth	16 August 2022	28 January 2024	RJD	
Finance; Commercial Tax; Parliamentary affairs	Vijay Kumar Chaudhary	16 August 2022	28 January 2024	JD(U)	
Energy; Planning & Development	Bijendra Prasad Yadav	16 August 2022	28 January 2024	JD(U)	
Building Construction	Ashok Choudhary	16 August 2022	28 January 2024	JD(U)	
Transport	Sheela Kumari	16 August 2022	28 January 2024	JD(U)	
Rural Development	Shrawan Kumar	16 August 2022	28 January 2024	JD(U)	
Water Resources; Information & Public Relations	Sanjay Kumar Jha	16 August 2022	28 January 2024	JD(U)	
Food & Consumer Protection Department	Leshi Singh	16 August 2022	28 January 2024	JD(U)	
Minority welfare	Mohd Zama Khan	16 August 2022	28 January 2024	JD(U)	
Minor Water Resources	Jayant Raj Kushwaha	16 August 2022	28 January 2024	JD(U)	
Social Welfare	Madan Sahni	16 August 2022	28 January 2024	JD(U)	
Excise & Prohibition	Sunil Kumar Singh	16 August 2022	28 January 2024	JD(U)	
SC/ST Welfare	Santosh Kumar Suman	16 August 2022	13 June 2023	HAM(S)	
SC/ST Welfare	Nitish Kumar	13 June 2023	16 June 2023	JD(U)	
SC/ST Welfare	Ratnesh Sada	16 June 2023	28 January 2024	JD(U)	
Animal Husbandry and Fisheries	Md Afaque Alam	16 August 2022	28 January 2024	INC	
Panchayati Raj	Murari Prasad Gautam	16 August 2022	28 January 2024	INC	
Science and Technology	Sumit Kumar Singh	16 August 2022	28 January 2024	Independent	

== See also ==
- Government of Bihar
- Bihar Legislative Assembly
- Bihar Legislative Council
- List of Chief Ministers of Bihar
- List of Deputy Chief Ministers of Bihar
- Sixth Nitish Kumar Ministry
- Seventh Nitish Kumar Ministry
