= Sixth Nitish Kumar ministry =

Government of Bihar, India (2017–2020)

- 37th Ministry of Bihar
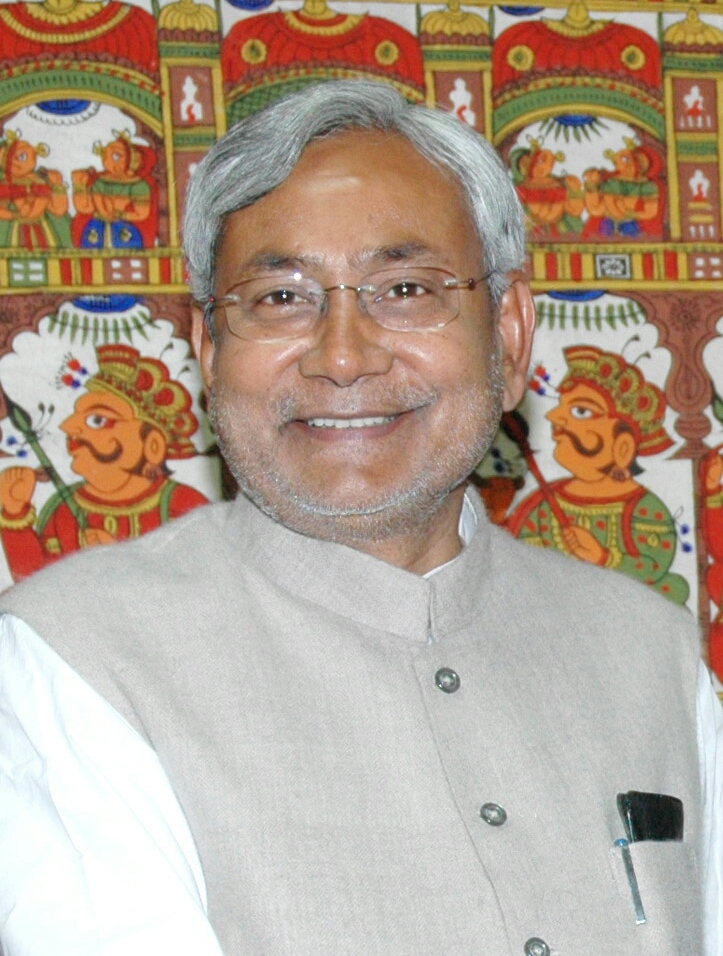
- Nitish Kumar; Hon'ble Chief Minister of Bihar
- Date formed: 27 July 2017
- Date dissolved: 16 November 2020

People and organisations
- Head of state: Fagu Chauhan
- Head of government: Nitish Kumar
- No. of ministers: 28
- Ministers removed: 8
- Member parties: JD(U); BJP
- Status in legislature: Coalition
- Opposition party: RJD
- Opposition leader: Tejashwi Yadav (assembly)

History
- Election: 2015
- Legislature terms: 3 years, 112 days
- Predecessor: Fifth Nitish Kumar ministry
- Successor: Seventh Nitish Kumar ministry

This is a list of minister from Nitish Kumar's sixth cabinets starting from 27 July 2017. Nitish Kumar is the leader of JD(U) who was sworn in the Chief Ministers of Bihar in August 2017 with help of BJP.

== History ==
Nitish Kumar resigned on 26 July 2017 as Chief Minister of Bihar over differences with the coalition partner RJD due to naming of Tejashwi Yadav, the Deputy Chief Minister and Lalu's son in an FIR by the CBI. Hours later, he joined the NDA which had thus far been the opposition, and secured a majority in the Assembly, taking the Chief Minister-ship once again on the very next day.

== Council of Ministers ==
Portfolio	Minister	Took office	Left office	Party
Chief Minister; Home; General Administration; Cabinet Secretariat; Vigilance; Election; Other departments not allotted to any Minister	Nitish Kumar	27 July 2017	16 November 2020	JD(U)
Deputy Chief Minister; Finance & Commercial Taxes; Environment & Forest; Information & Technology	Sushil Kumar Modi	27 July 2017	16 November 2020	BJP
Minister of Energy; Minister of Prohibition, Registration & Excise	Bijendra Prasad Yadav	29 July 2017	16 November 2020	JD(U)
Minister of Agriculture	Prem Kumar	29 July 2017	16 November 2020	BJP
Minister of Water Resources	Lalan Singh	29 July 2017	May 2019	JD(U)
Minister of Water Resources	Sanjay Kumar Jha	2 June 2019	16 November 2020	JD(U)
Minister of Planning & Development	Lalan Singh	29 July 2017	May 2019	JD(U)
Minister of Planning & Development	Maheshwar Hazari	2 June 2019	16 November 2020	JD(U)
Minister of Road Construction	Nand Kishore Yadav	29 July 2017	16 November 2020	BJP
Minister of Rural Development; Minister of Parliamentary Affairs	Shrawan Kumar	29 July 2017	16 November 2020	JD(U)
Minister of Revenue & Land Reforms	Ramnarayan Mandal	29 July 2017	16 November 2020	BJP
Minister of Industry	Jai Kumar Singh	29 July 2017	2 June 2019	JD(U)
Minister of Industry	Shyam Rajak	2 June 2019	16 August 2020	JD(U)
Minister of Science & Technology	Jai Kumar Singh	29 July 2017	16 November 2020	JD(U)
Minister of Health & Family Welfare	Mangal Pandey	29 July 2017	16 November 2020	BJP
Minister of Tourism	Pramod Kumar	29 July 2017	2 June 2019	BJP
Minister of Tourism	Krishna Kumar Rishi	2 June 2019	16 November 2020	BJP
Minister of Education	Krishna Nandan Prasad Verma	29 July 2017	16 November 2020	JD(U)
Minister of Building Construction	Maheshwar Hazari	29 July 2017	2 June 2019	JD(U)
Minister of Building Construction	Ashok Choudhary	2 June 2019	6 November 2020	JD(U)
Minister of Public Health Engineering Department	Vinod Narayan Jha	29 July 2017	16 November 2020	BJP
Minister of Rural Works	Shailesh Kumar	29 July 2017	16 November 2020	JD(U)
Minister of Urban Development & Housing	Suresh Kumar Sharma	29 July 2017	16 November 2020	BJP
Minister of Social Welfare	Manju Verma	29 July 2017	8 August 2018	JD(U)
Minister of Social Welfare	Ramsevak Singh	2 June 2019	16 November 2020	JD(U)
Minister of Labour Resources	Vijay Kumar Sinha	29 July 2017	16 November 2020	BJP
Minister of Transport	Santosh Kumar Nirala	29 July 2017	16 November 2020	JD(U)
Minister of Co-operative	Rana Randhir	29 July 2017	16 November 2020	BJP
Minister of Minority Welfare	Khurshid Urf Firoj Ahmad	29 July 2017	16 November 2020	JD(U)
Minister of Sugarcane Industries	Khurshid Urf Firoj Ahmad	29 July 2017	2 June 2019	JD(U)
Minister of Sugarcane Industries	Bima Bharti	2 June 2019	16 November 2020	JD(U)
Minister of Mines & Geology	Binod Kumar Singh	29 July 2017	2 June 2019	BJP
Minister of Mines & Geology	Brij Kishor Bind	2 June 2019	16 November 2020	BJP
Minister of Food & Consumer Protection	Madan Sahni	29 July 2017	16 November 2020	JD(U)
Minister of Art, Culture & Youth Affairs	Krishna Kumar Rishi	29 July 2017	2 June 2019	BJP
Minister of Art, Culture & Youth Affairs	Pramod Kumar	2 June 2019	16 November 2020	BJP
Minister of Panchayat Raj	Kapil Deo Kamat	29 July 2017	16 October 2020	JD(U)
Minister of Minor Irrigation	Dinesh Chandra Yadav	29 July 2017	May 2019	JD(U)
Minister of Minor Irrigation	Narendra Narayan Yadav	2 June 2019	16 November 2020	JD(U)
Minister of Disaster Management	Dinesh Chandra Yadav	29 July 2017	May 2019	JD(U)
Minister of Disaster Management	Lakshmeshwar Rai	2 June 2019	16 November 2020	JD(U)
Minister of Scheduled Caste/Scheduled Tribe Welfare	Ramesh Rishidev	29 July 2017	16 November 2020	JD(U)
Minister of Backward & Extremely Backward Classes Welfare	Brij Kishor Bind	29 July 2017	2 June 2019	BJP
Minister of Backward & Extremely Backward Classes Welfare	Binod Kumar Singh	2 June 2019	12 October 2020	BJP
Minister of Animal & Fish Resources	Pashupati Kumar Paras	29 July 2017	May 2019	LJP
Minister of Animal & Fish Resources	Prem Kumar	2 June 2019	16 November 2020	BJP
Minister of Law	Narendra Narayan Yadav	2 June 2019	16 November 2020	JD(U)
Minister of Information & Public Relations	Neeraj Kumar	2 June 2019	6 November 2020	JD(U)

== See also ==
- Government of Bihar
- Bihar Legislative Assembly
- Second Nitish Kumar ministry
- Third Nitish Kumar ministry
- Fifth Nitish Kumar ministry
