= Ninth Nitish Kumar ministry =

Government of Bihar, India (2024–25)

- 40th Ministry of Bihar

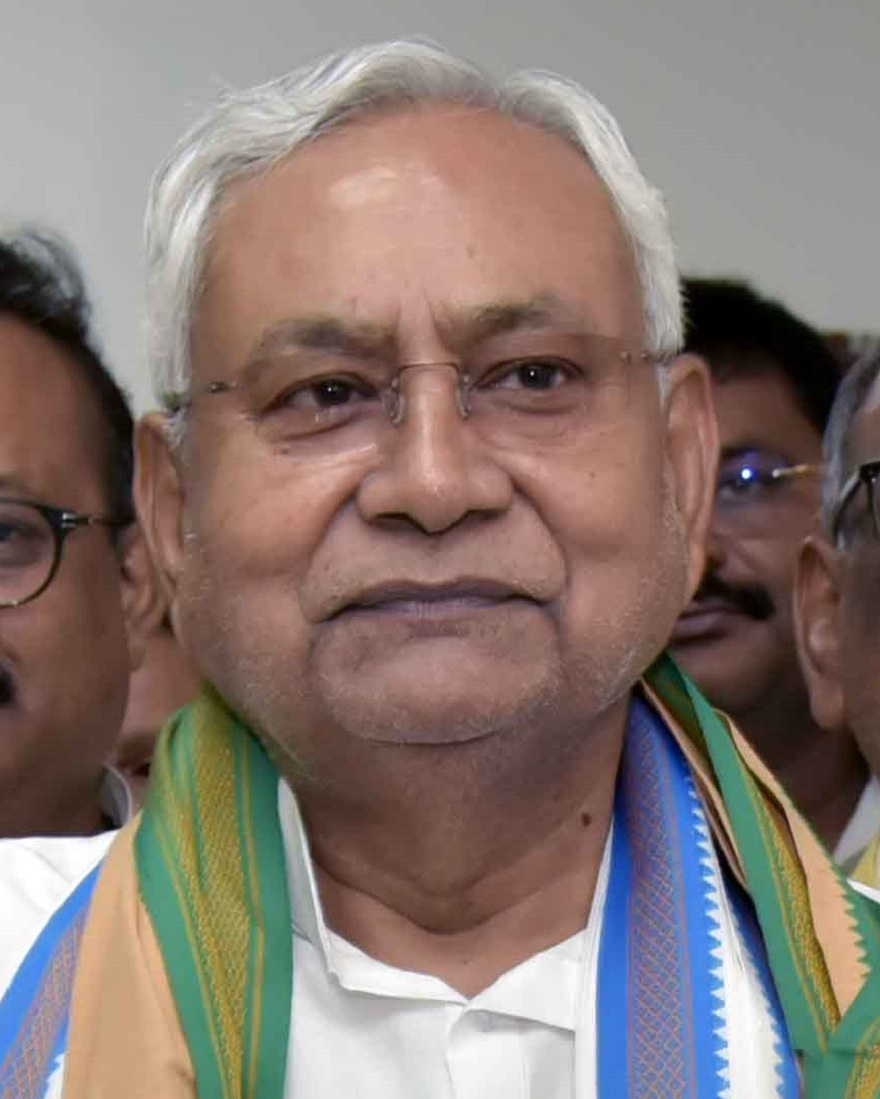
- Nitish Kumar; Hon'ble Chief Minister of Bihar
- Date formed: 28 January 2024
- Date dissolved: 20 November 2025

People and organisations
- Governor: Rajendra Arlekar; Arif Mohammad Khan
- Chief Minister: Nitish Kumar
- Deputy Chief Minister: Vijay Kumar Sinha; Samrat Choudhary
- Member parties: BJP; JD(U); HAM(S); IND
- Status in legislature: Coalition
- Opposition party: RJD
- Opposition leader: Tejashwi Yadav (Assembly); Rabri Devi (Council)

History
- Election: 2020
- Legislature terms: 1 year, 293 days
- Predecessor: Eighth Nitish ministry
- Successor: Tenth Nitish ministry

The Ninth Nitish Kumar ministry was the Council of Ministers in Bihar Legislative Assembly headed by Chief Minister Nitish Kumar. On 28 January 2024, he walked out of the INDIA (alliance) and announced his resignation. He then decided to form a new government in Bihar along with the BJP's NDA alliance.

== Council of Ministers ==
Source On 15 March 2024, Cabinet expansion held in which 21 new ministers 12 from BJP quota and 9 from JDU quota were inducted. Following are the ministers after full cabinet expansion.

Nitish Kumar inducted 7 MLAs from Bharatiya Janata party into his cabinet on 26 February 2025.

Portfolio	Minister	Took office	Left office	Party
Chief Minister; Home; General Administration; Cabinet Secretariat; Vigilance; Election; Other departments not allocated to any Minister	Nitish Kumar	28 January 2024	20 November 2025	JD(U)
Deputy Chief Minister; Minister of Finance; Minister of Commercial Taxes	Samrat Choudhary	28 January 2024	20 November 2025	BJP
Deputy Chief Minister; Minister of Mines & Geology	Vijay Sinha	28 January 2024	20 November 2025	BJP
Minister of Road Construction	Vijay Sinha	28 January 2024	26 February 2025	BJP
Minister of Road Construction	Nitin Nabin	26 February 2025	20 November 2025	BJP
Minister of Art, Culture & Youth	Vijay Sinha	28 January 2024	26 February 2025	BJP
Minister of Art, Culture & Youth	Moti Lal Prasad	26 February 2025	20 November 2025	BJP
Minister of Parliamentary Affairs	Vijay Chaudhary	28 January 2024	20 November 2025	JD(U)
Minister of Water Resources	Vijay Chaudhary	28 January 2024	20 November 2025	JD(U)
Minister of Energy	Bijendra Yadav	28 January 2024	20 November 2025	JD(U)
Minister of Planning & Development	Bijendra Yadav	28 January 2024	20 November 2025	JD(U)
Minister of Co-operative	Prem Kumar	28 January 2024	20 November 2025	BJP
Minister of Environment & Forest	Prem Kumar	28 January 2024	26 February 2025	BJP
Minister of Environment & Forest	Sunil Kumar	26 February 2025	20 November 2025	BJP
Minister of Rural Development	Shrawan Kumar	28 January 2024	20 November 2025	JD(U)
Minister of Minor Water Resources	Santosh Suman	28 January 2024	20 November 2025	HAM(S)
Minister of Information Technology	Santosh Suman	28 January 2024	26 February 2025	HAM(S)
Minister of Information Technology	Krishna Kumar Mantoo	26 February 2025	20 November 2025	BJP
Minister of Disaster Management	Santosh Suman	28 January 2024	26 February 2025	HAM(S)
Minister of Disaster Management	Vijay Kumar Mandal	26 February 2025	20 November 2025	BJP
Minister of Science & Technology	Sumit Singh	28 January 2024	20 November 2025	Independent
Minister of Animal and Fisheries Resources	Renu Devi	15 March 2024	20 November 2025	BJP
Minister of Health	Mangal Pandey	15 March 2024	20 November 2025	BJP
Minister of Agriculture	Mangal Pandey	15 March 2024	26 February 2025	BJP
Minister of Agriculture	Vijay Sinha	26 February 2025	20 November 2025	BJP
Minister of Public Health Engineering	Neeraj Singh	15 March 2024	20 November 2025	BJP
Minister of Industries	Nitish Mishra	15 March 2024	20 November 2025	BJP
Minister of Tourism	Nitish Mishra	15 March 2024	26 February 2025	BJP
Minister of Tourism	Raju Kumar Singh	26 February 2025	20 November 2025	BJP
Minister of Urban Development & Housing	Nitin Nabin	15 March 2024	26 February 2025	BJP
Minister of Urban Development & Housing	Jivesh Mishra	26 February 2025	20 November 2025	BJP
Minister of Law	Nitin Nabin	15 March 2024	26 February 2025	BJP
Minister of Law	Mangal Pandey	26 February 2025	20 November 2025	BJP
Minister of Revenue & Land Reforms	Dilip Jaiswal	15 March 2024	26 February 2025	BJP
Minister of Revenue & Land Reforms	Sanjay Saraogi	26 February 2025	20 November 2025	BJP
Minister of SC & ST Welfare	Janak Ram	15 March 2024	20 November 2025	BJP
Minister of BC & EBC Welfare	Hari Sahni	15 March 2024	20 November 2025	BJP
Minister of Sugarcane Industries	Krishnanandan Paswan	15 March 2024	20 November 2025	BJP
Minister of Panchayati Raj	Kedar Gupta	15 March 2024	20 November 2025	BJP
Minister of Sports	Surendra Mehata	15 March 2024	20 November 2025	BJP
Minister of Labour Resources	Santosh Singh	15 March 2024	20 November 2025	BJP
Minister of Rural Works	Ashok Choudhary	15 March 2024	20 November 2025	JD(U)
Minister of Food & Consumer Protection	Leshi Singh	15 March 2024	20 November 2025	JD(U)
Minister of Social Welfare	Madan Sahni	15 March 2024	20 November 2025	JD(U)
Minister of Information & Public Relations	Maheshwar Hazari	15 March 2024	20 November 2025	JD(U)
Minister of Transport	Sheela Mandal	15 March 2024	20 November 2025	JD(U)
Minister of Education	Sunil Kumar	15 March 2024	20 November 2025	JD(U)
Minister of Building Construction	Jayant Raj Kushwaha	15 March 2024	20 November 2025	JD(U)
Minister of Minority Welfare	Zama Khan	15 March 2024	20 November 2025	JD(U)
Minister of Excise & Prohibition	Ratnesh Sada	15 March 2024	20 November 2025	JD(U)

== See also ==
- Government of Bihar
- Bihar Legislative Assembly
- Bihar Legislative Council
- List of Chief Ministers of Bihar
- List of Deputy Chief Ministers of Bihar
