= Second Nitish Kumar ministry =

Government of Bihar, India, 2005–2010

- 32nd Ministry of Bihar
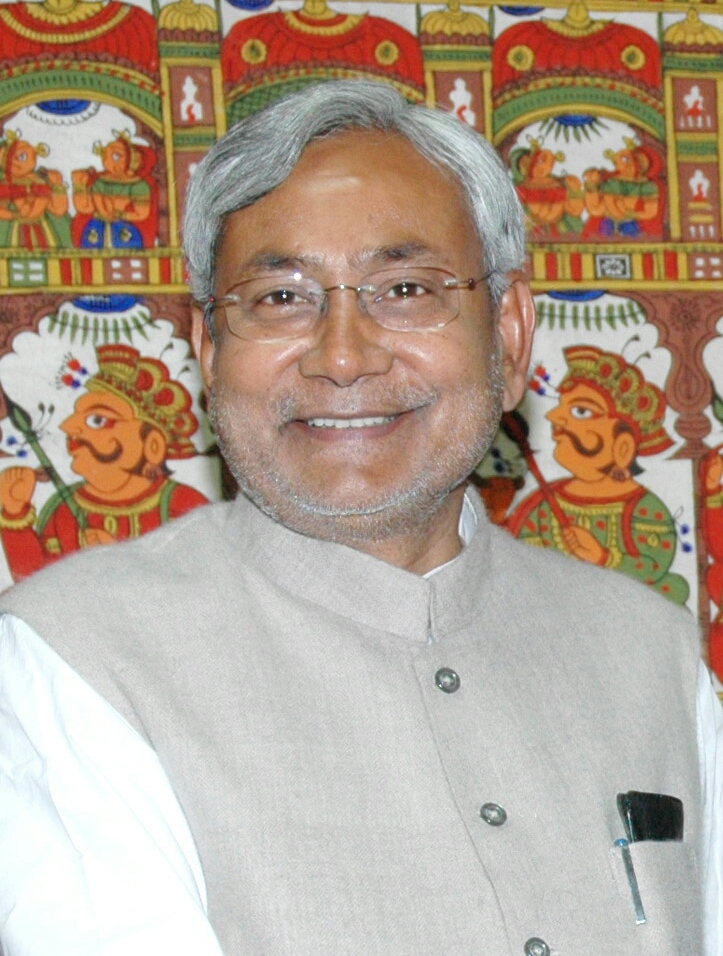
- Nitish Kumar; Hon'ble Chief Minister of Bihar
- Date formed: 24 November 2005
- Date dissolved: 26 November 2010

People and organisations
- Head of state: Buta Singh; Gopalkrishna Gandhi; R. S. Gavai; R. L. Bhatia; Devanand Konwar
- Head of government: Nitish Kumar
- Member parties: JD(U); BJP
- Status in legislature: Coalition
- Opposition party: RJD
- Opposition leader: Rabri Devi

History
- Election: October 2005
- Legislature terms: 6 years (Council); 5 years (Assembly)
- Predecessor: Third Rabri Devi ministry
- Successor: Third Nitish Kumar ministry

This is a list of minister from Nitish Kumar cabinets starting from 24 November 2005 to 26 November 2010. Nitish Kumar is the leader of Janata Dal (United) was sworn in the Chief Ministers of Bihar on 24 November 2005 with help of Bharatiya Janata Party. . Here is the list of the ministers of his ministry.

== Council of Ministers ==
Portfolio	Minister	Took office	Left office	Party
Chief Minister; Home; General Administration; Cabinet Secretariat; Vigilance; Election; Other departments not allotted to any Minister	Nitish Kumar	24 November 2005	26 November 2010	JD(U)
Deputy Chief Minister; Finance & Commercial Taxes	Sushil Kumar Modi	24 November 2005	26 November 2010	BJP
Minister of Parliamentary Affairs	Ramashray Prasad Singh	24 November 2005	26 November 2010	JD(U)
Minister of Water Resources	Ramashray Prasad Singh	24 November 2005	13 April 2008	JD(U)
Minister of Water Resources	Bijendra Prasad Yadav	13 April 2008	26 November 2010	JD(U)
Minister of Agriculture	Narendra Singh	24 November 2005	13 April 2008	JD(U)
Minister of Agriculture	Nagmani	13 April 2008	26 November 2010	JD(U)
Minister of Education	Brishin Patel	24 November 2005	13 April 2008	JD(U)
Minister of Education	Hari Narayan Singh	13 April 2008	26 November 2010	JD(U)
Minister of Building Construction	Monazir Hassan	24 November 2005	13 April 2008	JD(U)
Minister of Building Construction	Chhedi Paswan	13 April 2008	26 November 2010	JD(U)
Minister of Revenue & Land Reforms	Ram Nath Thakur	24 November 2005	13 April 2008	JD(U)
Minister of Revenue & Land Reforms	Narendra Narayan Yadav	13 April 2008	26 November 2010	JD(U)
Minister of Road Construction	Nand Kishore Yadav	24 November 2005	13 April 2008	BJP
Minister of Road Construction	Prem Kumar	13 April 2008	26 November 2010	BJP
Minister of Tourism	Nand Kishore Yadav	24 November 2005	13 April 2008	BJP
Minister of Tourism	Rampravesh Rai	13 April 2008	26 November 2010	BJP
Minister of Health & Family Welfare	Chandra Mohan Rai	24 November 2005	13 April 2008	BJP
Minister of Health & Family Welfare	Nand Kishore Yadav	13 April 2008	26 November 2010	BJP
Minister of Public Health Engineering Department	Prem Kumar	24 November 2005	13 April 2008	BJP
Minister of Public Health Engineering Department	Ashwini Kumar Choubey	13 April 2008	26 November 2010	BJP
Minister of Urban Development & Housing	Ashwini Kumar Choubey	24 November 2005	13 April 2008	BJP
Minister of Urban Development & Housing	Bhola Singh	13 April 2008	22 May 2009	BJP
Minister of Art, Culture, Youth Affairs & Sports	Janardhan Singh Sigriwal	24 November 2005	13 April 2008	BJP
Minister of Art, Culture, Youth Affairs & Sports	Renu Devi	13 April 2008	26 November 2010	BJP
Minister of Energy	Bijendra Prasad Yadav	24 November 2005	13 April 2008	JD(U)
Minister of Energy	Ramashray Prasad Singh	13 April 2008	26 November 2010	JD(U)
Minister of Excise & Prohibition	Sudha Srivastav	24 November 2005	13 April 2008	JD(U)
Minister of Excise & Prohibition	Jamshed Ashraf	13 April 2008	26 November 2010	JD(U)
Minister of Panchayat Raj	Narendra Narayan Yadav	24 November 2005	13 April 2008	JD(U)
Minister of Panchayat Raj	Hari Prasada Sah	13 April 2008	26 November 2010	JD(U)
Minister of Rural Development	Baidyanath Prasad Mahto	24 November 2005	13 April 2008	JD(U)
Minister of Rural Development	Bhagwan Singh Kushwaha	13 April 2008	26 November 2010	JD(U)
Minister of Environment & Forest	Ramchandra Sahani	24 November 2005	13 April 2008	BJP
Minister of Environment & Forest	Ramjidas Rishidev	13 April 2008	26 November 2010	BJP
Minister of Co-operative	Ramjidas Rishidev	24 November 2005	13 April 2008	BJP
Minister of Co-operative	Giriraj Singh	13 April 2008	26 November 2010	BJP
Minister of Food & Civil Supplies	Suchitra Sinha	24 November 2005	13 April 2008	JD(U)
Minister of Food & Civil Supplies	Narendra Singh	13 April 2008	26 November 2010	JD(U)
Minister of Transport	Ajit Kumar	24 November 2005	13 April 2008	JD(U)
Minister of Transport	Ramanand Prasad Singh	13 April 2008	18 May 2008	JD(U)
Minister of Science & Technology	Dr Anil Kumar	24 November 2005	13 April 2008	JD(U)
Minister of Science & Technology	Shahid Ali Khan	13 April 2008	26 November 2010	JD(U)
Minister of Industry	Gautam Singh	24 November 2005	13 April 2008	JD(U)
Minister of Industry	Dinesh Chandra Yadav	13 April 2008	22 May 2009	JD(U)
Minister of Minority Welfare	Manzar Alam	24 November 2005	13 April 2008	JD(U)
Minister of Minority Welfare	Shahid Ali Khan	13 April 2008	26 November 2010	JD(U)
Minister of Information & Public Relations	Arjun Rai	24 November 2005	13 April 2008	JD(U)
Minister of Information & Public Relations	Ram Nath Thakur	13 April 2008	26 November 2010	JD(U)
Minister of Minor Irrigation	Vishwa Mohan Kumar	24 November 2005	13 April 2008	JD(U)
Minister of Minor Irrigation	Dinesh Prasad	13 April 2008	26 November 2010	JD(U)
Minister of Sugarcane Industries	Nitish Mishra	24 November 2005	13 April 2008	JD(U)
Minister of Sugarcane Industries	Gautam Singh	13 April 2008	26 November 2010	JD(U)
Minister of Social Welfare	Rameshwar Paswan	24 November 2005	13 April 2008	JD(U)
Minister of Social Welfare	Damodar Rout	13 April 2008	26 November 2010	JD(U)
Minister of Planning & Development	Sudha Srivastav	13 April 2008	26 November 2010	JD(U)
Minister of Law & Justice	Ram Nath Thakur	13 April 2008	26 November 2010	JD(U)
Minister of Schedule Caste Welfare	Jitan Ram Manjhi	13 April 2008	26 November 2010	JD(U)
Minister of Extremely Backward Class Welfare	Hari Prasad Sah	13 April 2008	26 November 2010	JD(U)
Minister of Animal Husbandry & Fisheries	Sushil Kumar Modi	24 November 2005	13 April 2008	BJP
Minister of Animal Husbandry & Fisheries	Ramnarayan Mandal	13 April 2008	26 November 2010	BJP
Minister of Labour & Employment	Sushil Kumar Modi	24 November 2005	13 April 2008	BJP
Minister of Labour & Employment	Awadhesh Narain Singh	13 April 2008	26 November 2010	BJP
Minister of Information Technology	Dr Anil Kumar	13 April 2008	26 November 2010	JD(U)
Minister of Mining & Geology	Sushil Kumar Modi	24 November 2005	13 April 2008	BJP
Minister of Mining & Geology	Ramchandra Sahani	13 April 2008	26 November 2010	BJP
Minister of Disaster Management	Nitish Mishra	13 April 2008	26 November 2010	JD(U)
Minister of state in Health & Family Welfare	Vyas Deo Prasad	13 April 2008	26 November 2010	BJP

== See also ==
- Government of Bihar
- Bihar Legislative Assembly
- Third Nitish Kumar ministry
- Fifth Nitish Kumar ministry
- Sixth Nitish Kumar ministry
