= Nitish Kumar ministry =

Nitish Kumar ministry may refer to these cabinets headed by Indian politician Nitish Kumar as chief minister of Bihar:

- First Nitish Kumar ministry (2000)
- Second Nitish Kumar ministry (2005–2010)
- Third Nitish Kumar ministry (2010–2014)
- Fourth Nitish Kumar ministry (2015)
- Fifth Nitish Kumar ministry (2015–2017)
- Sixth Nitish Kumar ministry (2017–2020)
- Seventh Nitish Kumar ministry (2020–2022)
- Eighth Nitish Kumar ministry (2022–2024)
- Ninth Nitish Kumar ministry (2024–2025)
- Tenth Nitish Kumar ministry (2025–2026)
