= Fifth Nitish Kumar ministry =

Government of Bihar, India (2015–17)

- 36th Ministry of Bihar
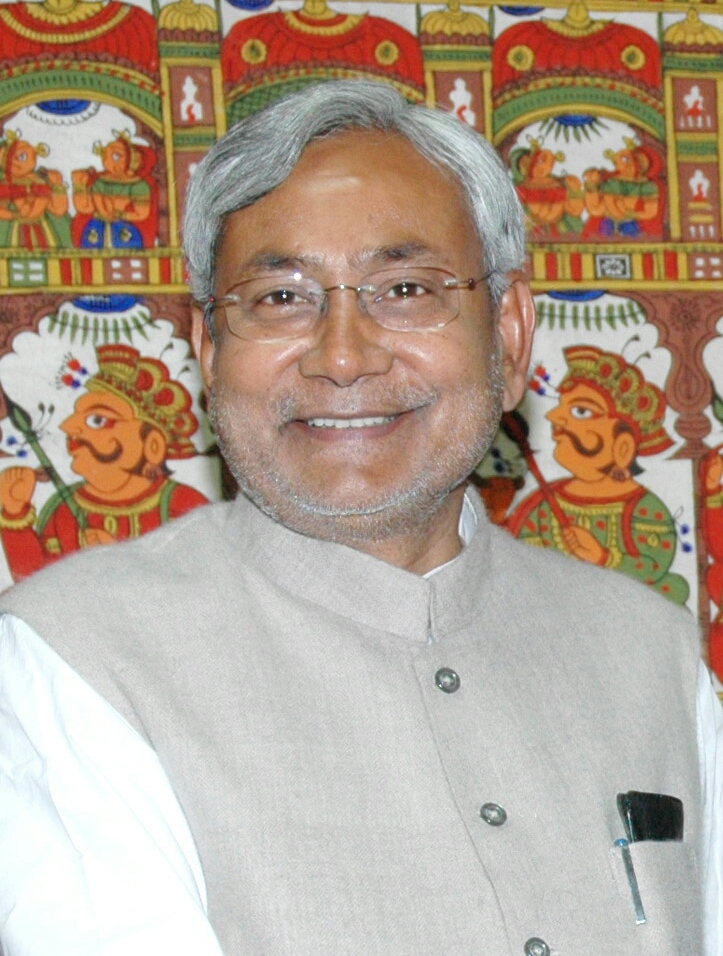
- Nitish Kumar; Hon'ble Chief Minister of Bihar
- Date formed: 20 November 2015
- Date dissolved: 26 July 2017

People and organisations
- Head of state: Governor: Ramnath Kovind; Keshari Nath Tripathi
- Head of government: Nitish Kumar
- No. of ministers: 29
- Member parties: JD(U); RJD; INC
- Status in legislature: Coalition
- Opposition party: BJP
- Opposition leader: Dr. Prem Kumar (assembly)

History
- Election: 2015
- Legislature terms: 1 year, 248 days
- Predecessor: Fourth Nitish Kumar ministry
- Successor: Sixth Nitish Kumar ministry

This is a list of minister from Nitish Kumar's fifth cabinet starting from 22 February 2015. Nitish Kumar is the leader of JD(U), who was sworn in the Chief Ministers of Bihar in February 2015 with help of Mahagathbandhan which included RJD and INC.

== History ==
Nitish Kumar took oath as Bihar Chief Minister along with 28 ministers, including RJD chief Lalu Prasad’s two sons Tejashwi Yadav and Tej Pratap in the grand alliance government of RJD, JD(U) & INC.

== Council of Ministers ==
Cabinet members
Portfolio	Minister	Took office	Left office	Party
Chief Minister; Home; General Administration; Cabinet Secretariat; Vigilance; Election; Information & Public Relations; Other departments not allocated to any Minister	Nitish Kumar	20 November 2015	26 July 2017	JD(U)
Deputy Chief Minister; Minister of Road Construction; Minister of Building Construction; Minister of Backward Class Development	Tejashwi Yadav	20 November 2015	26 July 2017	RJD
Minister of Education; Minister of Information & Technology	Ashok Choudhary	20 November 2015	26 July 2017	INC
Minister of Water Resources	Lalan Singh	20 November 2015	26 July 2017	JD(U)
Minister of Health & Family Welfare; Minister of Environment & Forest; Minister of BC & EBC Welfare	Tej Pratap Yadav	20 November 2015	26 July 2017	RJD
Minister of Revenue	Madan Mohan Jha	20 November 2015	26 July 2017	INC
Minister of Energy; Minister of Planning & Development	Bijendra Prasad Yadav	20 November 2015	26 July 2017	JD(U)
Minister of Finance	Abdul Bari Siddiqui	20 November 2015	26 July 2017	RJD
Minister of Animal Husbandry & Fish Resources	Awdhesh Kumar Singh	20 November 2015	26 July 2017	INC
Minister of Panchayat Raj	Kapil Deo Kamat	20 November 2015	26 July 2017	JD(U)
Minister of Labour Resources	Vijay Prakash Yadav	20 November 2015	26 July 2017	RJD
Minister of Excise	Abdul Jalil Mastan	20 November 2015	26 July 2017	INC
Minister of Food & Civil Supplies	Madan Sahni	20 November 2015	26 July 2017	JD(U)
Minister of Transport	Chandrika Roy	20 November 2015	26 July 2017	RJD
Minister of Rural Development; Minister of Parliamentary Affairs	Shrawan Kumar	20 November 2015	26 July 2017	JD(U)
Minister of Mining & Geology	Muneshwar Chaudhary	20 November 2015	26 July 2017	RJD
Minister of Urban Development	Maheshwar Hazari	20 November 2015	26 July 2017	JD(U)
Minister of Disaster Management	Prof. Chandrasekhar	20 November 2015	26 July 2017	RJD
Minister of Rural Works	Shailesh Kumar	20 November 2015	26 July 2017	JD(U)
Minister of Minority Welfare	Abdul Ghafoor	20 November 2015	26 July 2017	RJD
Minister of SC/ST Development	Santosh Kumar Nirala	20 November 2015	26 July 2017	JD(U)
Minister of Art, Culture & Youth Affairs	Shivchandra Ram	20 November 2015	26 July 2017	RJD
Minister of Public Health Engineering Dept; Minister of Law	Krishna Nandan Prasad Verma	20 November 2015	26 July 2017	JD(U)
Minister of Co-operative	Alok Kumar Mehta	20 November 2015	26 July 2017	RJD
Minister of Industry; Minister of Science & Technology	Jai Kumar Singh	20 November 2015	26 July 2017	JD(U)
Minister of Tourism	Anita Devi	20 November 2015	26 July 2017	RJD
Minister of Social Welfare	Manju Verma	20 November 2015	26 July 2017	JD(U)
Minister of Agriculture	Ram Vichar Ray	20 November 2015	26 July 2017	RJD
Minister of Sugar Cane Industries	Khurshid Urf Firoj Ahmad	20 November 2015	26 July 2017	JD(U)

== See also ==
- Government of Bihar
- Bihar Legislative Assembly
- Sixth Nitish Kumar ministry
