= Third Nitish Kumar ministry =

Government of Bihar, India (2010–14)

- 33rd Ministry of Bihar
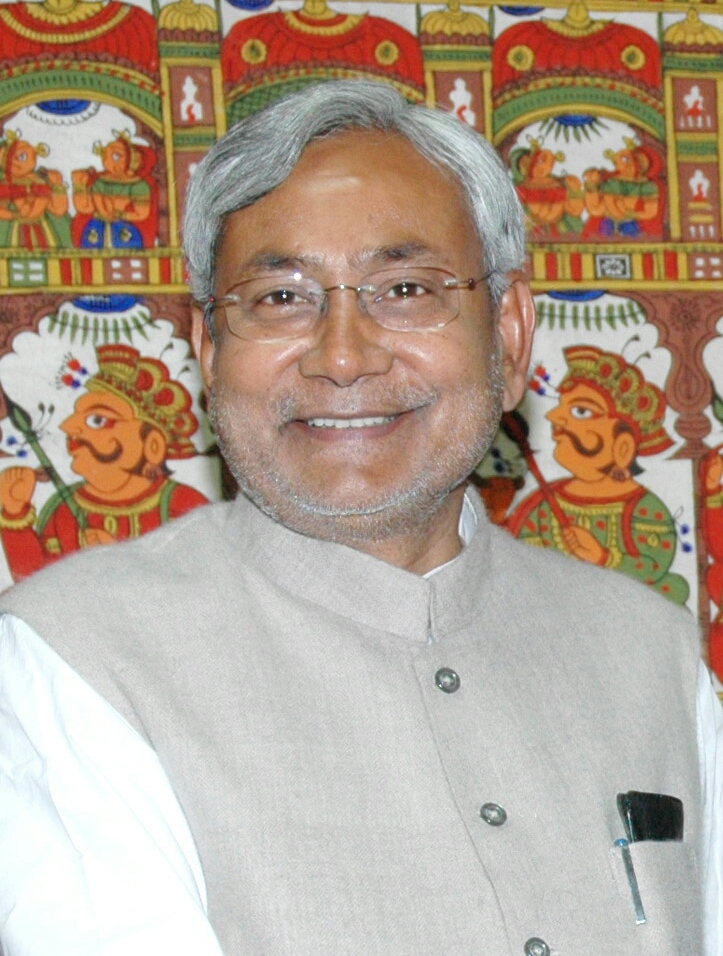
- Nitish Kumar; Hon'ble Chief Minister of Bihar
- Date formed: 26 November 2010
- Date dissolved: 20 May 2014

People and organisations
- Head of state: Governor; Devanand Konwar; D. Y. Patil
- Head of government: Nitish Kumar
- No. of ministers: 18
- Member parties: JD(U)
- Status in legislature: Coalition
- Opposition party: BJP; RJD
- Opposition leader: (16 June 2013 onwards): Nand Kishore Yadav (Assembly); Sushil Kumar Modi (Council)

History
- Election: 2010
- Legislature term: 5 years
- Predecessor: Second Nitish Kumar ministry
- Successor: Jitan Ram Manjhi ministry

This is a list of ministers from Nitish Kumar's third cabinet starting from 26 November 2010.

On 16 June 2013, the JDU separated from NDA after Narendra Modi was announced as the Prime Ministerial candidate of the BJP for the 2014 Indian general election, following which Ministers from the BJP were dropped from the cabinet.

== Council of Ministers ==
Portfolio	Minister	Took office	Left office	Party
Chief Minister; Home; General Administration; Cabinet Secretariat; Vigilance; Election; Other departments not allocated to any Minister	Nitish Kumar	26 November 2010	20 May 2014	JD(U)
Deputy Chief Minister; Finance; Commercial Taxes; Environment & Forest	Sushil Kumar Modi	26 November 2010	16 June 2013	BJP
Deputy Chief Minister; Finance; Commercial Taxes; Environment & Forest	Nitish Kumar	16 June 2013	20 May 2014	JD(U)
Minister of Water Resources	Vijay Chaudhary	26 November 2010	20 May 2014	JD(U)
Minister of Energy; Minister of Parliamentary Affairs; Minister of Prohibition, Registration & Excise	Bijendra Prasad Yadav	26 November 2010	20 May 2014	JD(U)
Minister of Road Construction	Nand Kishore Yadav	26 November 2010	16 June 2013	BJP
Minister of Road Construction	Nitish Kumar	16 June 2013	20 May 2014	JD(U)
Minister of Agriculture	Narendra Singh	26 November 2010	20 May 2014	JD(U)
Minister of Transport; Minister of Information & Public Relations	Brishin Patel	26 November 2010	20 May 2014	JD(U)
Minister of Revenue & Land Reforms	Ramai Ram	26 November 2010	20 May 2014	JD(U)
Minister of Public Health Engineering Department	Chandra Mohan Rai	26 November 2010	16 June 2013	BJP
Minister of Public Health Engineering Department	Nitish Kumar	16 June 2013	20 May 2014	JD(U)
Minister of Health & Family Welfare	Ashwini Kumar Choubey	26 November 2010	16 June 2013	BJP
Minister of Health & Family Welfare	Nitish Kumar	16 June 2013	20 May 2014	JD(U)
Minister of Panchayat Raj	Hari Prasad Sah	26 November 2010	3 October 2011	JD(U)
Minister of Panchayat Raj	Nitish Kumar	3 October 2011	7 October 2011	JD(U)
Minister of Panchayat Raj	Bhim Singh	7 October 2011	20 May 2014	JD(U)
Minister of BC & EBC Welfare	Hari Prasad Sah	26 November 2010	3 October 2011	JD(U)
Minister of BC & EBC Welfare	Nitish Kumar	3 October 2011	7 October 2011	JD(U)
Minister of BC & EBC Welfare	Jitan Ram Manjhi	7 October 2011	20 May 2014	JD(U)
Minister of Rural Works	Bhim Singh	26 November 2010	20 May 2014	JD(U)
Minister of Industry; Minister of Disaster Management	Renu Kushawaha	26 November 2010	20 May 2014	JD(U)
Minister of SC/ST Welfare	Jitan Ram Manjhi	26 November 2010	20 May 2014	JD(U)
Minister of Building Construction	Damodar Rout	26 November 2010	20 May 2014	JD(U)
Minister of Urban Development & Housing	Prem Kumar	26 November 2010	16 June 2013	BJP
Minister of Urban Development & Housing	Nitish Kumar	16 June 2013	20 May 2014	JD(U)
Minister of Law; Minister of Planning & Development	Narendra Narayan Yadav	26 November 2010	20 May 2014	JD(U)
Minister of Education	Prashant Kumar Shahi	26 November 2010	20 May 2014	JD(U)
Minister of Minority Welfare; Minister of Information Technology	Shahid Ali Khan	26 November 2010	20 May 2014	JD(U)
Minister of Food & Consumer Protection	Shyam Rajak	26 November 2010	20 May 2014	JD(U)
Minister of Social Welfare	Parveen Amanullah	26 November 2010	20 May 2014	JD(U)
Minister of Rural Development	Nitish Mishra	26 November 2010	20 May 2014	JD(U)
Minister of Sugarcane Industries; Minister of Minor Irrigation	Avadesh Kushwaha	26 November 2010	20 May 2014	JD(U)
Minister of Science & Technology	Gautam Singh	26 November 2010	20 May 2014	JD(U)
Minister of Labour Resources	Janardan Singh Sigriwal	26 November 2010	16 June 2013	BJP
Minister of Labour Resources	Nitish Kumar	16 June 2013	20 May 2014	JD(U)
Minister of Animal & Fish Resources	Giriraj Singh	26 November 2010	16 June 2013	BJP
Minister of Animal & Fish Resources	Nitish Kumar	16 June 2013	20 May 2014	JD(U)
Minister of Mines & Geology	Satyadev Narayan Arya	26 November 2010	16 June 2013	BJP
Minister of Mines & Geology	Nitish Kumar	16 June 2013	20 May 2014	JD(U)
Minister of Co-operative	Ramadhar Singh	26 November 2010	16 June 2013	BJP
Minister of Co-operative	Nitish Kumar	16 June 2013	20 May 2014	JD(U)
Minister of Art, Culture & Youth Affairs	Sukhada Pandey	26 November 2010	16 June 2013	BJP
Minister of Art, Culture & Youth Affairs	Nitish Kumar	16 June 2013	20 May 2014	JD(U)
Minister of Tourism	Sunil Kumar Pintu	26 November 2010	16 June 2013	BJP
Minister of Tourism	Nitish Kumar	16 June 2013	20 May 2014	JD(U)
