= Bharatiya Janata Party – Bihar =

Bihar affiliate of The Bharatiya Janata Party

- Leader: Samrat Choudhary (Chief Minister)
- President: Sanjay Saraogi
- General Secretary: Bhikhubhai Dalsaniya (Organisation)
- Founder: Kailashpati Mishra; Atal Bihari Vajpayee; Lal Krishna Advani; Murli Manohar Joshi; Nanaji Deshmukh; K. R. Malkani; Sikandar Bakht; Vijay Kumar Malhotra; Vijaya Raje Scindia; Bhairon Singh Shekhawat; Shanta Kumar; Ram Jethmalani; Jagannathrao Joshi
- Founded: 6 April 1980 (46 years ago)
- Headquarters: 8, Veerchand Patel Path, Patna, Bihar
- Colours: Saffron
- Seats in Rajya Sabha: 7 / 16
- Seats in Lok Sabha: 12 / 40
- Seats in Bihar Legislative Council: 27 / 75
- Seats in Bihar Legislative Assembly: 89 / 243

Election symbol
- Lotus

Party flag

The Bharatiya Janata Party – Bihar (BJP - Bihar) is a state unit of the Bharatiya Janata Party in Bihar. Sanjay Saraogi the current president of the BJP Bihar. Kailashpati Mishra was founding leader of BJP in Bihar.

== Electoral history ==
=== Lok Sabha election ===
Year	Seats won	+/-	Outcome
1980	0 / 54	steady	Opposition
1984	0 / 54	steady	Opposition
1989	8 / 54	▲8	Outside support to JD
1991	5 / 54	▼3	Opposition
1996	18 / 54	▲13	Government, later Opposition
1998	19 / 54	▲1	Government
1999	23 / 54	▲4	Government
2004	5 / 40	▼18	Opposition
2009	12 / 40	▲7	Opposition
2014	22 / 40	▲10	Government
2019	17 / 40	▼5	Government
2024	12 / 40	▼5	Government

=== Legislative Assembly election ===
Year	Seats		+/-	Voteshare (%)	+/- (%)	Outcome
Year	Won	Contested	+/-	Voteshare (%)	+/- (%)	Outcome
1980	21 / 324	246	▲21	8.41%	▲8.41%	Opposition
1985	16 / 324	234	▼5	7.54%	▼0.87%	Opposition
1990	39 / 324	237	▲23	11.61%	▲4.07%	Outside support to JD
1995	41 / 324	315	▲2	12.96%	▲1.35%	Opposition
2000	67 / 324	168	▲26	14.64%	▲1.68%	Opposition
2005	37 / 243	103	▼30	10.97%	▼3.67%	steady
2005	55 / 243	102	▲18	15.65%	▲4.68%	Government
2010	91 / 243	102	▲36	16.49%	▲0.84%	Government, later Opposition
2015	53 / 243	157	▼38	24.42%	▲7.93%	Opposition, later Government
2020	74 / 243	110	▲21	19.46%	▼4.96%	Government
2025	89 / 243	101	▲15	20.08%	▲0.62%	Government

== Leadership ==
=== Chief Minister ===
#	Portrait	Name	Constituency	Term of office			Assembly
1		Samrat Choudhary	Tarapur	15 April 2026	Incumbent	221 days	18th

=== Deputy Chief Minister ===
#	Portrait	Name	Constituency	Term of office			Assembly	Chief Minister
1		Sushil Kumar Modi	MLC	24 November 2005	26 November 2010	10 years, 316 days	14th	Nitish Kumar
1		Sushil Kumar Modi	MLC	26 November 2010	16 June 2013	10 years, 316 days	15th	Nitish Kumar
1		Sushil Kumar Modi	MLC	27 July 2017	16 November 2020	10 years, 316 days	16th	Nitish Kumar
2		Tarkishore Prasad	Katihar	16 November 2020	9 August 2022	1 year, 266 days	17th	Nitish Kumar
2		Renu Devi	Bettiah	16 November 2020	9 August 2022	1 year, 266 days	17th	Nitish Kumar
3		Samrat Choudhary	Tarapur	28 January 2024	15 April 2026	2 years, 77 days	17th	Nitish Kumar
3		Vijay Kumar Sinha	Lakhisarai	28 January 2024	15 April 2026	2 years, 77 days	17th	Nitish Kumar

=== Leader of the Opposition Legislative Assembly ===
#	Portrait	Name	Constituency	Term of office			Assembly	Chief Minister
1		Yashwant Sinha	Ranchi	17 April 1995	24 January 1996	282 days	11th	Lalu Prasad Yadav
2		Sushil Kumar Modi	Patna Central	19 March 1996	1 March 2000	8 years, 9 days	11th	Rabri Devi
2		Sushil Kumar Modi	Patna Central	15 March 2000	28 March 2004	8 years, 9 days	12th	Rabri Devi
3		Nand Kishore Yadav	Patna Sahib	19 June 2013	4 December 2015	2 years, 168 days	15th	Nitish Kumar
4		Prem Kumar	Gaya Town	4 December 2015	28 July 2017	1 year, 236 days	16th	Nitish Kumar
5		Vijay Sinha	Lakhisarai	24 August 2022	28 January 2024	1 year, 157 days	17th	Nitish Kumar

=== Leader of the Opposition Legislative Council ===
#	Portrait	Name	Constituency	Term of office			Chief Minister
1		Ganga Prasad Chaurasia	elected by MLA's	20 November 2000	5 March 2005	4 years, 105 days	Rabri Devi
2		Sushil Kumar Modi	elected by MLA's	19 June 2013	27 July 2017	4 years, 38 days	Nitish Kumar
3		Samrat Choudhary	elected by MLA's	24 August 2022	20 August 2023	361 days	Nitish Kumar
4		Hari Sahni	elected by MLA's	20 August 2023	28 January 2024	161 days	Nitish Kumar

=== President ===
#	Portrait	Name	Term of office		
1		Kailashpati Mishra	1980	1982	2 years
2		Jagadambi Prasad Yadav	1982	1984	2 years
(1)		Kailashpati Mishra	1984	1988	4 years
3		Inder Singh Namdhari	1988	1990	2 years
4		Tarakant Jha	1990	1993	3 years
5		Ashwani Kumar	1994	1996	2 years
6		Yashwant Sinha	1997	1998	1 year
7		Nand Kishore Yadav	1998	2003	5 years
8		Gopal Narayan Singh	16 October 2003	31 May 2005	1 year, 227 days
9		Sushil Kumar Modi	31 May 2005	15 October 2006	1 year, 137 days
10		Radha Mohan Singh	15 October 2006	24 April 2010	3 years, 191 days
11		C. P. Thakur	24 April 2010	18 January 2013	2 years, 269 days
12		Mangal Pandey	18 January 2013	30 November 2016	3 years, 317 days
13		Nityanand Rai	30 November 2016	14 September 2019	2 years, 288 days
14		Sanjay Jaiswal	14 September 2019	24 March 2023	3 years, 191 days
15		Samrat Choudhary	24 March 2023	26 July 2024	1 year, 124 days
16		Dilip Kumar Jaiswal	26 July 2024	15 December 2025	2 years, 119 days
17		Sanjay Saraogi	15 December 2025	present	342 days

== See also ==
- Bharatiya Janata Party
- National Democratic Alliance
- Janata Dal (United)
- Bharatiya Janata Party – Gujarat
- Bharatiya Janata Party – Uttar Pradesh
- Bharatiya Janata Party – Madhya Pradesh
- State units of the Bharatiya Janata Party
