= First Nitish Kumar ministry =

Government of Bihar, India (2000)

- 30th Ministry of Bihar

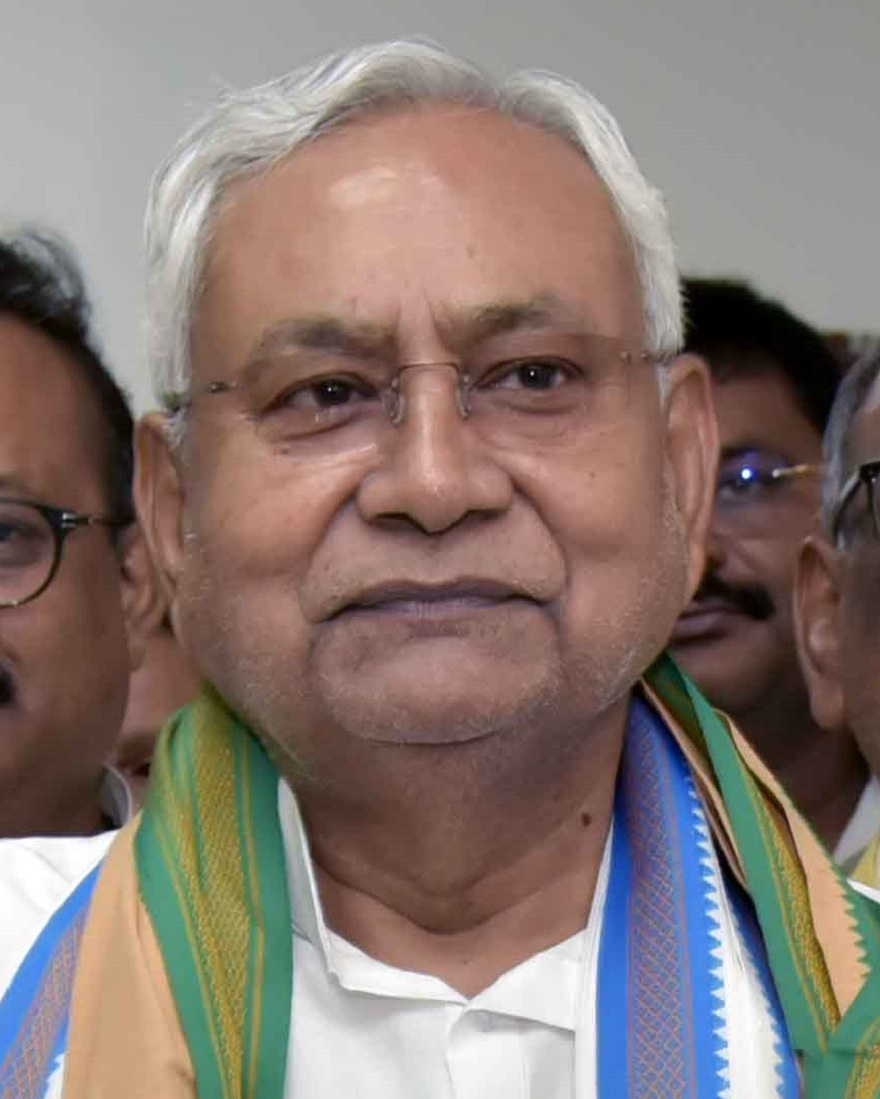
- Incumbent; Nitish Kumar; Hon'ble Chief Minister of Bihar
- Date formed: 3 March 2000
- Date dissolved: 10 March 2000

People and organisations
- Governor: V. C. Pande
- Chief Minister: Nitish Kumar
- Member parties: BJP; SAP; IND
- Status in legislature: Coalition
- Opposition party: RJD

History
- Election: 2000
- Legislature term: 7 days
- Predecessor: Second Rabri ministry
- Successor: Third Rabri ministry

The First Nitish Kumar ministry was the 30th Council of Ministers in Bihar Legislative Assembly headed by Chief Minister Nitish Kumar. On 10 March 2000, he was forced to resign just before the trust vote in the Assembly.

== Council of Ministers ==
Cabinet
Portfolio	Minister	Took office	Left office	Party
Chief Minister; Home Affairs; General Administration; Cabinet Secretariat; Vigilance; Election; Other departments not allotted to any Minister	Nitish Kumar	3 March 2000	10 March 2000	SAP
Finance & Commercial Taxes	-	3 March 2000	10 March 2000	
Minister of Parliamentary Affairs	-	3 March 2000	10 March 2000	
Minister of Water Resources	-	3 March 2000	10 March 2000	
Minister of Agriculture	-	3 March 2000	10 March 2000	
Minister of Education	-	3 March 2000	10 March 2000	
Minister of Building Construction	-	3 March 2000	10 March 2000	
Minister of Revenue & Land Reforms	-	3 March 2000	10 March 2000	
Minister of Road Construction	-	3 March 2000	10 March 2000	
Minister of Tourism	-	3 March 2000	10 March 2000	
Minister of Health & Family Welfare	-	3 March 2000	10 March 2000	
Minister of Public Health Engineering Department	-	3 March 2000	10 March 2000	
Minister of Urban Development & Housing	-	3 March 2000	10 March 2000	
Minister of Art, Culture, Youth Affairs & Sports	-	3 March 2000	10 March 2000	
Minister of Energy	-	3 March 2000	10 March 2000	
Minister of Excise & Prohibition	-	3 March 2000	10 March 2000	
Minister of Panchayat Raj	-	3 March 2000	10 March 2000	
Minister of Rural Development	-	3 March 2000	10 March 2000	
Minister of Environment & Forest	-	3 March 2000	10 March 2000	
Minister of Co-operatives	-	3 March 2000	10 March 2000	
Minister of Food & Civil Supplies	-	3 March 2000	10 March 2000	
Minister of Transport	-	3 March 2000	10 March 2000	
Minister of Science & Technology	-	3 March 2000	10 March 2000	
Minister of Industry	-	3 March 2000	10 March 2000	
Minister of Minority Welfare	-	3 March 2000	10 March 2000	
Minister of Information & Public Relations	-	3 March 2000	10 March 2000	
Minister of Minor Irrigation	-	3 March 2000	10 March 2000	
Minister of Sugarcane Industries	-	3 March 2000	10 March 2000	
Minister of Social Welfare	-	3 March 2000	10 March 2000	
Minister of Planning & Development	-	3 March 2000	10 March 2000	
Minister of Law & Justice	-	3 March 2000	10 March 2000	
Minister of Schedule Caste Welfare	-	3 March 2000	10 March 2000	
Minister of Extremely Backward Class Welfare	-	3 March 2000	10 March 2000	
Minister of Animal Husbandry & Fisheries	-	3 March 2000	10 March 2000	
Minister of Labour & Employment	-	3 March 2000	10 March 2000	
Minister of Information Technology	-	3 March 2000	10 March 2000	
Minister of Mining & Geology	-	3 March 2000	10 March 2000	
Minister of Disaster Management	-	3 March 2000	10 March 2000	
Minister of state in Health & Family Welfare	-	3 March 2000	10 March 2000	
