= Kartikeya Singh =

Indian politician

Member of Bihar Legislative Council
- Incumbent
- Assumed office April 2022

Minister of Law Government of Bihar
- In office 16 August 2022 – 31 August 2022
- Preceded by: Pramod Kumar
- Succeeded by: Shamim Ahmad

Minister of Sugarcane Industries Government of Bihar
- In office 31 August 2022 – 31 August 2022

Personal details
- Party: Rashtriya Janata Dal
- Spouse: Ranjana Kumari
- Occupation: Politician

Kartikeya Singh (also known as Kartik Singh, Kartikey Kumar and Kartik Master) is an Indian politician affiliated with the Rashtriya Janata Dal. He currently serves as a member of the Bihar Legislative Council and was appointed as a Cabinet minister in the government led by Nitish Kumar in Bihar.

== Background and career ==
Kartik Kumar is considered to be close to don-turned-politician Anant Kumar Singh. He was elected to the Bihar Legislative Council in April 2022, winning the election from Patna on the ticket of Rashtriya Janata Dal.

He briefly served as Bihar's Law Minister before his removal from the position in August 2022. He was removed from the post of Law Minister due to facing kidnapping charges in a 2014 case and being issued a warrant in the case by the Danapur sub-divisional court. His removal came following opposition from various political parties and public protests against his appointment to the Law Ministry. After his removal from the Law Ministry, Kartik Kumar was appointed as the Minister of Sugarcane Industries. However, he resigned from this position on the same day of his appointment.

He was a teacher before entering politics. His wife, Ranjana Kumari, served as the chief (Mukhiya) for two consecutive terms. He came into contact with Anant Kumar Singh in 2005. He also served as an election strategist for Anant Singh. He has assets worth Rs. 990 million, as per his declaration in the election.

As of August 2020, he faces multiple charges including theft, kidnapping, rioting, obstructing government work, criminal conspiracy and extortion while armed with deadly weapons. He is also accused of causing damage to public infrastructure such as roads, bridges and rivers.
