= Krishna Kumar Rishi =

Indian politician

Minister of Tourism Government of Bihar
- In office 2 June 2019 – 16 November 2020
- Chief Minister: Nitish Kumar
- Preceded by: Pramod Kumar
- Succeeded by: Jibesh Kumar

Minister of Art, Culture & Youth Affairs Government of Bihar
- In office 29 July 2017 – 2 June 2019
- Chief Minister: Nitish Kumar
- Preceded by: Shiv Chandra Ram
- Succeeded by: Pramod Kumar

Member of Bihar Legislative Assembly
- Incumbent
- Assumed office 2005
- Preceded by: Deo Narayan Rajak
- Constituency: Banmankhi

Personal details
- Born: Krishna Kumar Rishi; 2 May 1975 (age 51)
- Party: Bharatiya Janata Party

Krishna Kumar is an Indian politician. He was elected to the Bihar Legislative Assembly from Banmankhi in the 2015 Bihar Legislative Assembly election as a member of the Bharatiya Janata Party. He is Minister of Tourism in Nitish Kumar cabinet from 2017.
