= Bhrigu Ballia =

Bhrigu Ballia is a village in Balia Panchyat, Maharajganj Block, Siwan district, Bihar, India. The village is named after the great sage Bhrigu. The languages spoken in the village are Hindi and Bhojpuri (mainly). The village is surrounded by Daraundha Block towards South, Bhagwanpur Hat Block towards East, Pachrukhi Block towards west, Goriakothi Block towards North.

The ex-state president of BJP in Bihar, Sri Mangal Pandey's hometown is in this village, where he spent his whole childhood.

The people in this village are living peacefully, mostly educated. The sex ratio is balanced as well.
