= List of ministers of law of Bihar =

This is a list of law ministers of Bihar, India. Sanjay Singh Tiger is the current Law Minister of Bihar.

== List ==
#	Portrait	Name	Term			Chief Minister	Party
1		Ram Nath Thakur	13 April 2008	26 November 2010	2 years, 227 days	Nitish Kumar	Janata Dal (United)
2		Narendra Narayan Yadav	26 November 2010	20 May 2014	3 years, 175 days	Nitish Kumar	Janata Dal (United)
(2)		Narendra Narayan Yadav	20 May 2014	22 February 2015	278 days	Nitish Kumar	Janata Dal (United)
(2)		Narendra Narayan Yadav	22 February 2015	20 November 2015	271 days	Nitish Kumar	Janata Dal (United)
3		Krishna Nandan Prasad Verma	20 November 2015	26 July 2017	1 year, 248 days	Nitish Kumar	Janata Dal (United)
(2)		Narendra Narayan Yadav	2 June 2019	16 November 2020	1 year, 167 days	Nitish Kumar	Janata Dal (United)
4		Ram Surat Rai	16 November 2020	9 February 2021	85 days	Nitish Kumar	Bharatiya Janata Party
5		Pramod Kumar	9 February 2021	9 August 2022	1 year, 181 days	Nitish Kumar	Bharatiya Janata Party
6		Kartik Kumar	16 August 2022	31 August 2022	15 days	Nitish Kumar	Rashtriya Janata Dal
7		Shamim Ahmad	31 August 2022	28 January 2024	1 year, 150 days	Nitish Kumar	Rashtriya Janata Dal
8		Nitin Nabin	15 March 2024	20 November 2025	1 year, 250 days	Nitish Kumar	Bharatiya Janata Party
9		Mangal Pandey	20 November 2025	15 April 2026	146 days	Nitish Kumar	Bharatiya Janata Party
10		Samrat Choudhary	15 April 2026	07 May 2026	22 days	Himself	Bharatiya Janata Party
11		Sanjay Singh Tiger	07 May 2026	Incumbent	179 days	Samrat Choudhary	Bharatiya Janata Party

== See also ==
- List of ministers of finance of Bihar
- List of ministers of health of Bihar
- List of ministers of sports of Bihar
- List of ministers of panchayati raj of Bihar
- List of ministers of transport of Bihar
- List of ministers of co-operatives of Bihar
- List of ministers of science and technology of Bihar
