= Nishant Kumar (politician) =

Indian politician (born 1981)

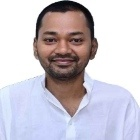
- Nishant in 2026

Minister of Health & Family Welfare Government of Bihar
- Incumbent
- Assumed office 7 May 2026
- Chief Minister: Samrat Choudhary
- Governor: Syed Ata Hasnain

Member of Bihar Legislative Council
- Incumbent
- Assumed office 11 June 2026
- Preceded by: Samrat Choudhary
- Constituency: elected by MLA's

Personal details
- Born: 20 July 1981 (age 45) Patna, Bihar, India
- Party: Janata Dal (United) (since 2026)
- Parent: Nitish Kumar
- Occupation: Politician

Nishant Kumar (born 20 July 1981) is an Indian politician who currently serves as Minister of Health in the state of Bihar. He is the son of Nitish Kumar, the former and longest-serving Chief Minister of Bihar.

== Early life ==
Nishant was born on 20 July 1981 to Nitish Kumar and Manju Kumari Sinha. His mother died in 2007 from pneumonia. His father is a politician and is the longest-tenured chief minister in Bihari history, holding the post for 10 terms. According to his June 2026 election affidavit filed for the Bihar Legislative Council polls, his legal name is Nishant, without a surname.

In his youth, Nishant attended St. Karen's High School in Patna and Manava Bharati India International School in Mussoorie. Nishant attended the Birla Institute of Technology, Mesra in Ranchi, where he studied software engineering. According to his official election affidavit filings, he did not complete the degree program, withdrawing after completing five of the required eight semesters. He lives in Patna and did not pursue a political career until 2026, often staying away from politics as a whole. He is unmarried and has no children.

== Political career ==
In March 2026, Nishant joined the Janata Dal (United) following his father's announcement of his pending resignation. This was a departure from the party's previous policy of anti-dynasticism.

In May 2026, Nishant joined the ministry of Samrat Choudhary as health minister.
