= Department of Sports, Government of Bihar =

State government department for sports development in Bihar

Department of Sports
Department overview
- Formed: January 9, 2024
- Preceding Department: Art, Culture & Youth Department
- Jurisdiction: Government of Bihar
- Headquarters: Patna, Bihar, India
- Annual budget: ₹568 crore (2025–26)
- Minister responsible: Shreyasi Singh, Minister of Sports, Bihar
- Department executive: Principal Secretary / Director
- Parent department: Government of Bihar
- Website: Department of Sports, Bihar

The Department of Sports, Government of Bihar is a state government department responsible for the promotion of sports, physical fitness, and athlete development in the Indian state of Bihar. It was established on 9 January 2024, following its separation from the Department of Art, Culture and Youth

== Budget ==
In the 2025–26 budget, the department was allocated ₹568 crore. Of this, about ₹373 crore was earmarked for stadiums and sports infrastructure, while ₹195 crore was directed towards sports development and activities.

== Statistics ==
Metric	Value	Notes
Athletes at 2025 Khelo India Youth Games	~8,500	From 36 states/UTs, hosted in Bihar
Bihar medal tally at KIYG 2025	36 medals (7 gold)	Bihar ranked 14th
Sports clubs in Bihar	~991	Registered across the state
State sports associations	~78	Covering various disciplines
Awards and honours distributed	644 (2024–25)	Including 615 athletes, 21 coaches, 4 associations, 4 officials. Prize money ~₹7.5 crore.

== Initiatives ==
- Construction of block-level stadiums (252 announced).
- Development of sports complexes in Jamui and Kaimur districts.
- Khel Pratibha Khoj Pratiyogita – a school-level talent hunt programme.
- Safety and facility upgrades in district sports buildings worth ₹10.26 crore.

== See also ==
- Government of Bihar
- Bihar State Sports Authority
- Sports in Bihar
- Khelo India Youth Games
