= St. Karen's High School, Patna =

Karen's High School

Location
- Gola Road, Danapur, Patna, Bihar 801503; India; 25°37′16.67″N 85°3′24.74″E

Information
- Type: Private
- Motto: "Labour Reaps Reward"
- Patron saint: St. Katherine of Siena
- Founded: 1965; 61 years ago
- Founder: Lesley Barbara Galstaun; Donald Patrick Galstaun
- Status: Active
- Sister school: St. Karen’s Secondary School; St. Karen's Primary School; St. Karen's Montessori School; St. Karen's Collegiate School; St. Karen's Senior Secondary School
- Session: April–March
- School code: BR08250
- Director: Donald Patrick Galstaun
- Principal: Seema Singh
- Language: English/Hindi
- Schedule type: Morning
- Hours in school day: 6 hrs
- Houses: Blue, green, red, and yellow
- Sports: Football; cricket; table tennis; caroms; chess; throw ball; yoga; badminton
- Publication: Karenoscope
- Affiliations: Central Board of Secondary Education
- Alumni: Karenite

St. Karen's High School, Patna is a minority private Anglo-Indian Christian co-educational high school located in Gola Road area of Danapur, Patna, in the state of Bihar, India. Established in 1965, the school is affiliated with the Central Board of Secondary Education, New Delhi. The school celebrated its Golden Jubilee in 2015.

== History ==
St. Karen's High School, Patna was founded in 1965 by Donald Patrick Galstaun and his wife, Lesley Barbara Galstaun. The school was started in rented premises in 1965 and grew over time to multiple branches. In 2015, the school celebrated its Golden Jubilee.

The school derives its name from the novel Karen written by Marie Killilea in 1952. St. Karen's High School is a minority Anglo-Indian Christian school and was established by The Anglo–Indian Educational Society of St. Karen's, which is a registered body. St. Karen's High School is the first school in the St. Karen's Group of Schools based in Patna. The other schools in the group are St. Karen's Secondary School, St. Karen's Montessori School, St. Karen's Primary School, and St. Karen's Collegiate School.

== Location ==
The main school campus is located in Gola Road area of Patna. There are other branches of the school across Patna and Danapur area.

== Curriculum ==
The school is affiliated to the Central Board of Secondary Education, New Delhi.

== Notable alumni ==
- Nishant Kumar
- Sushant Singh Rajput
- Rati Pandey
