= Krishna Nandan Prasad Verma =

Former cabinet minister in Government of Bihar

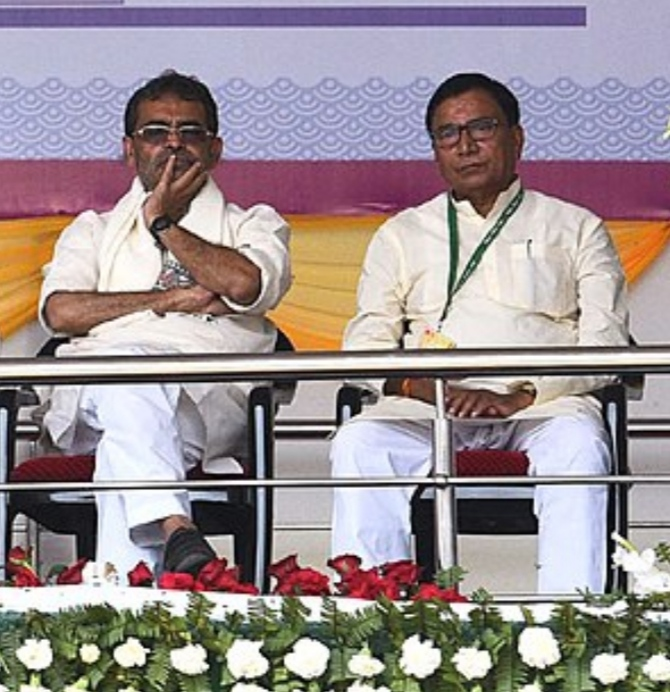
- Krishna Nandan Prasad Verma (right) with Upendra Kushwaha at Patna University centenary celebration.

Member of Bihar Legislative Assembly
- In office 2015–2020
- Constituency: Ghosi
- In office 2005–2010
- Constituency: Makhdumpur

Minister for Education Government of Bihar
- In office 29 July 2017 – 16 November 2020
- Preceded by: Ashok Choudhary
- Succeeded by: Vijay Kumar Chaudhary

Personal details
- Party: Janata Dal (United)
- Parent: Sukhdeo Prasad Verma (father)

Krishna Nandan Prasad Verma is an Indian politician, who was elected to Bihar Legislative Assembly from Ghosi Assembly constituency in 2015 Bihar Assembly elections. Verma is a member of Janata Dal (United). He has served as Minister for Education in Nitish Kumar's cabinet. He was also given charge of Social Justice ministry, after resignation of Manju Verma from this position, who resigned after being implicated in Muzaffarpur Shelter case. Verma has represented Mukhdumpur Assembly constituency as well. He lost to Suday Yadav of Rashtriya Janata Dal in 2020 Bihar Assembly elections, in a triangular contest involving Indu Devi Kashyap, a defector from Bhartiya Janata Party as third important candidate from this constituency, apart from himself and Yadav.

== Political career ==
Verma became a member of Bihar Legislative Assembly for his first term in 2005. He was elected from Makhdumpur Assembly constituency. In 2015, he was again elected, this time from Ghosi Assembly constituency. Following this victory, he was made a minister in Fifth and Sixth Nitish Kumar cabinet and was assigned education ministry. As a minister, he worked for education reforms and later, when he was assigned Social Welfare ministry, as a replacement to Manju Verma, he worked for social welfare as well. In 2020 Bihar Assembly elections, Janata Dal United made him a candidate from Jahanabad Assembly constituency. He lost to Suday Yadav, with a large share of votes also polling in favour of Indu Devi Kashyap, a defector of Bhartiya Janata Party, who contested as a candidate of Lok Janshakti Party.

The reshuffle which occurred by assigning him Social Welfare ministry after Manju Verma was seen by many political observers of Bihar as effort to placate Kushwaha caste, after resignation of Manju Verma, as both he and Manju belonged to this caste. During his tenure as education minister, Verma worked for ensuring error free conduction of Bihar Board examination, which was prone to various mismanagements. In 2018, Verma as education minister ordered inquiry against a government run school of Lalganj, which was alleged for segregating students in different sections on the basis of caste and religion.

However, in the end of his term in education ministry, the issue of contract teachers caused sentiment of anti-incumbency against the government. The contractual teachers sat on strike, demanding equal perks with those of permanent teachers, leaving more than fifty dead due to hunger strike. But Verma and the government failed to take action, in order to solve the issue. Though, in his tenure, vacancy for primary teachers were announced in an effort to create more jobs in public sector, the finalisation of this project couldn't be done until the end of his term as minister.

== See also ==
- Ajit Kumar Mehta
- Dev Dyal Kushwaha
