= Ram Surat Rai =

Indian politician

Ram Surat Kumar

Minister of Revenue Government of Bihar
- In office 16 November 2020 – 9 August 2022
- Chief Minister: Nitish Kumar
- Preceded by: Ramnarayan Mandal

Minister of Law Government of Bihar
- In office 16 November 2020 – 9 February 2021
- Chief Minister: Nitish Kumar
- Preceded by: Narendra Narayan Yadav
- Succeeded by: Pramod Kumar

Member of Bihar Legislative Assembly
- In office 2020–2025
- Preceded by: Surendra Kumar
- Succeeded by: Rama Nishad
- Constituency: Aurai
- In office 2010–2015
- Preceded by: Surendra Kumar
- Succeeded by: Surendra Kumar
- Constituency: Aurai

Personal details
- Born: 10 December 1972 (age 53)
- Party: Bharatiya Janata Party
- Profession: Politician

Ram Surat Rai Yadav is an Indian politician. He is a member of the Bharatiya Janata Party from Bihar. He was elected as a member of the 2020 Bihar Legislative Assembly election from Aurai (Vidhan Sabha constituency). He was denied ticket in 2025 Bihar assembly election.
