= Narendra Narayan Yadav =

Indian politician

Deputy Speaker of Bihar Legislative Assembly
- Incumbent
- Assumed office 23 February 2024
- Speakar: Nand Kishore Yadav; Prem Kumar
- Chief Minister: Nitish Kumar; Samrat Chaudhary
- Preceded by: Maheshwar Hazari

Member of Bihar Legislative Assembly
- Incumbent
- Assumed office 1995
- Preceded by: Birendra Kumar Singh
- Constituency: Alamnagar

Minister of Law Government of Bihar
- In office 2 June 2019 – 16 November 2020
- Preceded by: Krishna Nandan Prasad Verma
- Succeeded by: Ram Surat Rai
- In office 26 November 2010 – 20 November 2015
- Preceded by: Ram Nath Thakur
- Succeeded by: Krishna Nandan Prasad Verma

Minister of Minor Water Resources Government of Bihar
- In office 2 June 2019 – 16 November 2020
- Preceded by: Dinesh Chandra Yadav
- Succeeded by: Santosh Kumar Suman

Personal details
- Born: 16 January 1951 (age 75) Bala Tola, Madhepura, Bihar, India
- Party: Janata Dal (United)
- Other political affiliations: Janata Dal
- Education: Bachelor of Science Lalit Narayan Mithila University in 1974
- Profession: Politician

Narendra Narayan Yadav is an Indian politician who currently serves as Deputy Speaker of Bihar Legislative Assembly. He was elected to the Bihar Legislative Assembly from Alamnagar in the 2020 Bihar Legislative Assembly as a member of the Janata Dal (United). He also served as the Minister of Law and Minor Water Resources in the Bihar Cabinet under Nitish Kumar ministry. He started career in politics from 1967 in his childhood, was also involved in JP Movement and has been an MLA from Alamnagar constituency since 1995. He was appointed as the Pro tem Speaker on 24 November 2025 after the conclusion of 2025 Bihar Legislative Assembly election to facilitate the oath taking of new MLAs and the election of the new Assembly Speaker Dr. Prem Kumar.
