= Sanjay Kumar Jha =

Indian politician (born 1967)

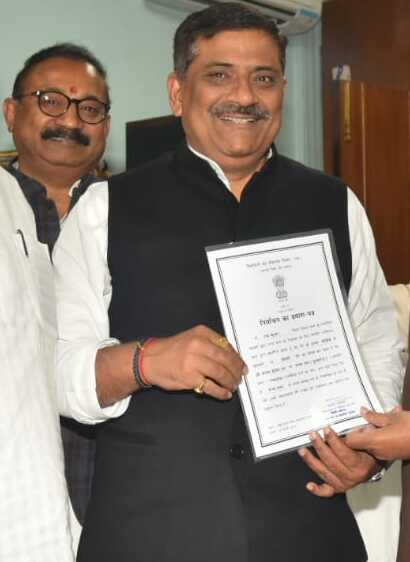

Member of Parliament, Rajya Sabha
- Incumbent
- Assumed office 4 April 2024
- Preceded by: Bashistha Narain Singh
- Constituency: Bihar

Member of Bihar Legislative Council
- In office 2019–2024
- In office 2006–2012

Cabinet Minister Government of Bihar
- In office 9 February 2021 – 28 January 2024
- Chief Minister: Nitish Kumar
- Ministry or Departments: Water Resources; Information & Public Relations
- Preceded by: Vijay Kumar Chaudhary
- Succeeded by: Vijay Kumar Chaudhary

Personal details
- Born: 1 December 1967 (age 58) Jhanjharpur, Madhubani
- Party: JD(U) (2012 - present)
- Other political affiliations: BJP (till 2012)
- Spouse: Enakshi Jha
- Children: 3
- Education: Jawaharlal Nehru University (M.A)
- Profession: Politician

Sanjay Kumar Jha (commonly known as Sanjay Jha; born 1 December 1967) is an Indian politician from Janata Dal (United). He currently serves as a Member of Parliament in the Rajya Sabha, representing Bihar, and holds the position of National Working President of the JD(U). He is also the leader of the JD(U) parliamentary party in the Rajya Sabha and chairs the Parliamentary Committee on Transport, Tourism and Culture. Previously, Jha served as the Minister for Water Resources as well as Information and Public Relations in the Government of Bihar as a Member of the Bihar Legislative Council. In February 2024, he was elected unopposed to the Rajya Sabha, succeeding Bashistha Narain Singh.

== Personal life ==
Sanjay Jha was born on 1 December 1967 in Araria Sangram village, located in the Jhanjharpur block of Madhubani district, Bihar. He holds a postgraduate degree from the prestigious Jawaharlal Nehru University (JNU). He is married to Enakshi Jha, and the couple has three children.

== Political life ==
=== Early association with BJP (2004–2012) ===
Jha entered active politics in the mid-2000s through the Bharatiya Janata Party (BJP). He was known to be close to senior BJP leader Arun Jaitley and played a backchannel role during the BJP–JD(U) alliance in Bihar. In 2006, he was elected to the Bihar Legislative Council as a BJP member and remained in office until 2012.

In 2009, he sought a BJP ticket to contest the Lok Sabha elections from Darbhanga, but the party denied him a nomination. Following this, Jha moved closer to JD(U) leader and Bihar Chief Minister Nitish Kumar. He formally joined the Janata Dal (United) in July 2012.

=== Janta Dal (United) (2012–present) ===
After joining JD(U), Jha quickly became one of Nitish Kumar’s trusted aides. He contested the 2014 Lok Sabha elections from Darbhanga on a JD(U) ticket but lost. He was re-elected to the Bihar Legislative Council in 2019 as a JD(U) representative.

In June 2019, Jha was appointed as Cabinet Minister in Bihar, overseeing the portfolios of Water Resources and Information & Public Relations. He continued in these roles until January 2024, when JD(U) exited the Grand Alliance coalition. During his tenure, he oversaw several significant initiatives, including - The Ganga Water Supply Scheme, The construction of a rubber dam on the Phalgu River in Gaya and The development of Mithila Haat and other cultural promotion projects.
