= Pramod Kumar =

Indian politician

Member of Bihar Legislative Assembly
- Incumbent
- Assumed office 27 February 2005
- Preceded by: Rama Devi
- Constituency: Motihari

Minister of Art, Culture & Youth Affairs Government of Bihar
- In office 2 June 2019 – 16 November 2020
- Chief Minister: Nitish Kumar
- Preceded by: Krishna Kumar Rishi
- Succeeded by: Mangal Pandey

Minister of Tourism Government of Bihar
- In office 29 July 2017 – 2 June 2019
- Chief Minister: Nitish Kumar
- Preceded by: Anita Devi
- Succeeded by: Krishna Kumar Rishi

Minister of Law Government of Bihar
- In office 9 February 2021 – 9 August 2022
- Chief Minister: Nitish Kumar
- Preceded by: Ram Surat Kumar

Minister of Sugarcane Industries Government of Bihar
- In office 9 February 2021 – 9 August 2022
- Chief Minister: Nitish Kumar
- Preceded by: Amrendra Pratap Singh

Personal details
- Born: 21 February 1962 (age 64)
- Party: Bharatiya Janata Party

Pramod Kumar is an Indian politician belonging to the Bharatiya Janata Party (BJP) who served as the Minister of Sugarcane Industries and Minister of Law in the Government of Bihar. He has been the member of Bihar Legislative Assembly since 2005 representing Motihari (Vidhan Sabha constituency). .

== Early life and education ==
Pramod Kumar was born to Yogendra Prasad, a political activist, who participated in Total revolution movement of Jay Prakash Narayan as a student. He is a member of Kanu (Halwai) caste. Kumar has pursued bachelor's degree in law and he was associated with Akhil Bharatiya Vidyarthi Parishad.

== Political career ==
Being a member of Rashtriya Swayamsevak Sangh, he also became active in Bharatiya Janata Party, an affiliate political organization of RSS. Kumar has served as district unit president of Bharatiya Janata Party for Motihari region. He won the election to Bihar Legislative Assembly for the first time in 2005 and from then onwards he is winning consecutively from this seat. In the cabinet expansion of 2021, he was made a minister in Government of Bihar under Nitish Kumar.
