= List of ministers of sports of Bihar =

Sports ministers of Bihar

The Ministers responsible for the Department of Sports, Government of Bihar, India have been:

== List ==
#	Portrait	Name	Term			Chief Minister	Party
1		Jitendra Kumar Rai	10 January 2024	28 January 2024	2 years, 178 days	Nitish Kumar	Rashtriya Janata Dal
2		Samrat Choudhary	28 January 2024	15 March 2024	47 days	Nitish Kumar	Bharatiya Janata Party
3		Surendra Mehta	15 March 2024	20 November 2025	1 year, 250 days	Nitish Kumar	Bharatiya Janata Party
4		Shreyasi Singh	20 November 2025	15 April 2026	146 days	Nitish Kumar	Bharatiya Janata Party
(2)		Samrat Choudhary	15 April 2026	7 May 2026	22 days	Himself	Bharatiya Janata Party
(4)		Shreyasi Singh	07 May 2026	Incumbent	61 days	Samrat Choudhary	Bharatiya Janata Party

== About ==
Sports Department is a recently established separate department under the Government of Bihar, constituted on January 9th, 2024. Previously, sports administration was under the purview of the Art, Culture and Youth Department, Govt. of Bihar. This sports dedicated department signifies the State Governments commitment in promoting a significant sporting culture within Bihar.

== Vision ==
Sports Department envisions a Bihar where sports events are not just recreational activity, but a way of life with aim to achieve excellence in endeavour. It aims to create a comprehensive ecosystem that fosters physical and mental well-being, cultivates sporting talent and positions Bihar as a force to be reckoned with in the national and international sporting arena.

== See also ==
- List of ministers of finance of Bihar
- List of ministers of health of Bihar
- List of ministers of panchayati raj of Bihar
- List of ministers of education of Bihar
- List of ministers of transport of Bihar
- List of ministers of co-operatives of Bihar
- List of ministers of science and technology of Bihar
