= Mangal Pandey (politician) =

Indian politician

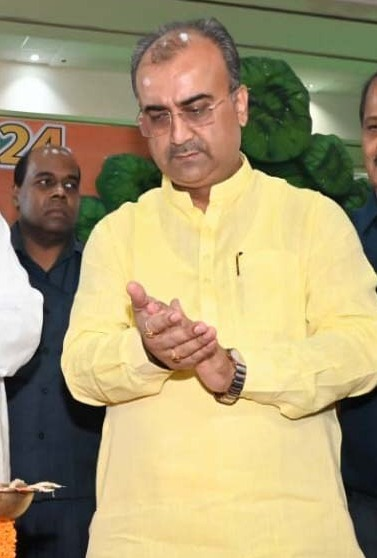

Minister of Health & Family Welfare Government of Bihar
- In office 15 March 2024 – 15 April 2026
- Chief Minister: Nitish Kumar
- Preceded by: Tejashwi Yadav
- Succeeded by: Samrat Choudhary
- In office 29 July 2017 – 9 August 2022
- Chief Minister: Nitish Kumar
- Preceded by: Tej Pratap Yadav
- Succeeded by: Tejashwi Yadav

Minister of Law & Justice Government of Bihar
- In office 26 February 2025 – 15 April 2026
- Chief Minister: Nitish Kumar
- Preceded by: Nitin Nabin
- Succeeded by: Samrat Choudhary

Minister of Agriculture Government of Bihar
- In office 15 March 2024 – 26 February 2025
- Chief Minister: Nitish Kumar
- Preceded by: Kumar Sarvjeet
- Succeeded by: Vijay Sinha

President of Bharatiya Janata Party – Bihar
- In office 18 January 2013 – 30 November 2016
- Preceded by: C. P. Thakur
- Succeeded by: Nityanand Rai

Member of Bihar Legislative Assembly
- Incumbent
- Assumed office 2025
- Preceded by: Awadh Bihari Choudhary
- Constituency: Siwan

Member of Bihar Legislative Council
- In office 7 May 2012 – 14 November 2025
- Constituency: elected by Members of Legislative Assembly

Personal details
- Born: 9 August 1972 (age 54) Siwan, Bihar, India
- Party: Bharatiya Janata Party
- Spouse: Urmila Pandey (m. 1998)
- Children: 1 son
- Parents: Awadhesh Pandey (father); Premlata Pandey (mother)
- Education: Magadh University (B.A.)

Mangal Pandey (born 9 August 1972) is an Indian politician belonging to the Bharatiya Janata Party (BJP) who has served as the Health Minister and Law Minister of Bihar. He has also served as the President of the BJP, Bihar from 2013 to 2017. Pandey, a leader of the Bharatiya Janata Party (BJP) has been a member of Legislative Council since 7 May 2012. Mangal Pandey is BJP in-charge of Himachal Pradesh to go as minister for the 2017 Vidhan Sabha election.

== Early life ==
Mangal Pandey was born on 9 August 1972 to a family of farmers in Bhirgu Baliya, Maharajganj, Siwan, Bihar. He was born to a Hindu Brahmin family.

He married Urmila Pandey on 19 April 1998. She is from Bhitti "Sahabuddin", "Baniyapur", Saran District. She is a housewife. They have a son.

Mangal Pandey completed his secondary education in Maharajgunj, Siwan in 1987 and higher secondary education in Science from Devi Dayal High School.

== Political career ==
In 1987, when Bharatiya Janta Party was picking grounds across the country, Pandey joined Akhil Bharatiya Vidyarthi Parishad (ABVP), the student wing of the RSS. During this period he became involved in printing pamphlets opposing the government, staging protests and organising demonstrations. He also started going to RSS sakhas from 1988 and became a regular swayamsevak.

He joined BJP in 1989 as a primary member from Maharajgunj and was made Member of working committee, Maharajgunj. In 1992, Pandey was elected working committee member of the party's Siwan unit, marking his entrance into full-time politics. He rose within the party, helping organise Shila pujan karyakram of Vishwa Hindu Parishad during 1988-89.

He was inducted in Bhartiya Janta Yuva Morcha state working committee in 1994. Within a short span of time, he was made in charge of Saran zone, BJYM in 1995.

Pandey was appointed as State Secretary, BJYM in 1997. As state secretary, he rigorously travelled across the state and was also co in charge for L. K. Advani’s Swarna Jayanti Rath Yatra during 1997-98.

In 2000, he was made the state president of BJYM. He had started a campaign against the then Lalu Yadav's government "Jawab Do Hisab Do". Under this campaign, party workers used to ask for the expenses done by state government for funds allocated by then Vajpeyee's government.

Failing to answer used to result in lock down of Block level offices. This campaign was a huge success. Over 10000 BJYM karyakartas were arrested statewide.

Pandey was arrested twice, first in Chhapra, then in Muzaffarpur; This gave him popularity across the state and party ranks.

In 2003, he was made zonal in charge of the organisation and later in 2005, he was made State General Secretary of BJP, Bihar. In 2006, under the Presidency of Radha Mohan Singh, he was again given responsibility of state general secretary for the second time. He continued in the office for another two terms in 2008 and in 2010.

== BJP State President, Bihar ==
When the whole country was getting ready for the General Elections in 2014, Pandey was given the responsibility of State President of Bihar's party unit on 18 January 2013.

After joining the office, his first assignment was marked in the State Working Committee Meeting at Gaya in 2013, wherein the committee passed a resolution and officially asked the national president, Rajnath Singh to fight 2014 General Elections in leadership of Narendra Modi.

The election campaign in Bihar was started by "Hunkar Rally" on 27 October 2013 at historical Gandhi Maidan where a head count of more than seven lakh people was recorded. While rally was proceeding, a serial blast took place killing 6 and injuring 108 people.

The party won in 2014 General Election and the NDA won 31 out of 40 seats in Bihar. Failure in Bihar assembly elections is a major setback in Pandey's political career.

== Inter-state Politics ==
After becoming the state president, Pandey tried gathering political support from the Biharis staying in different parts of the country. He frequently visits states like Maharashtra, Gujarat, Delhi, Karnataka and many others for political support. He made "Pravasi Bihari Prakosth" in states with significant Bihari population. It is supposed to act as a bridge between natives and immigrants of state.

== Controversy ==
On 14 April 2021, a retired soldier suffering from Covid died without any treatment at a hospital in Bihar, as the hospital authorities were busy preparing for the visit of the state health minister Mangal Pandey. The patient named Vinod Singh, died in the vehicle he was brought to the Nalanda Medical College and Hospital (NMCH). The authorities did not admit him despite his family's repeated requests.
