= Prem Kumar (politician) =

Indian politician

Dr. Prem Kumar
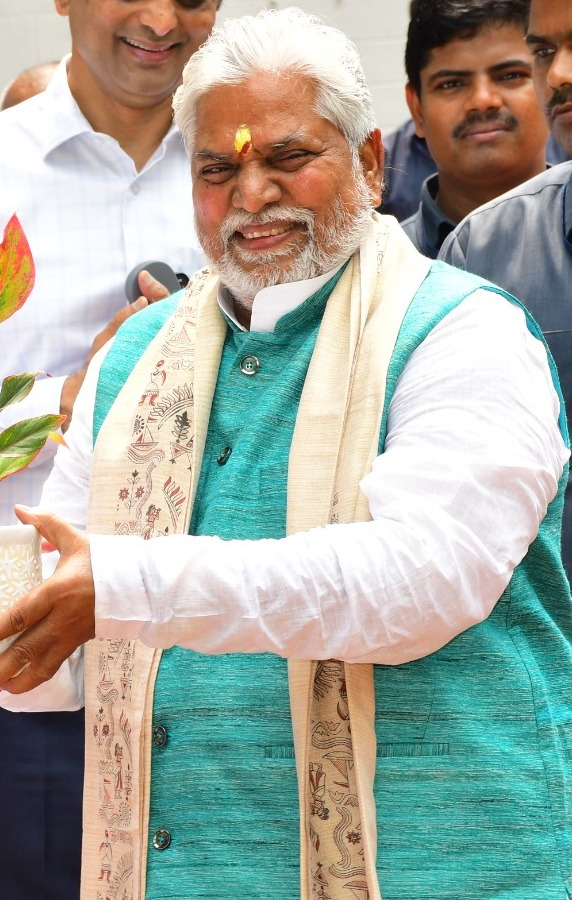

18th Speaker of the Bihar Legislative Assembly
- Incumbent
- Assumed office 2 December 2025
- Chief Minister Dy. Chief Ministers: Samrat Chaudhary; Bijendra Prasad Yadav & Vijay Kumar Chaudhary
- Deputy Speaker: Narendra Narayan Yadav
- Preceded by: Nand Kishore Yadav

Minister of Co-operative Government of Bihar
- In office 28 January 2024 – 20 November 2025
- Chief Minister: Nitish Kumar
- Preceded by: Surendra Prasad Yadav
- Succeeded by: Pramod Chandravanshi

Minister of Environment and Forest Government of Bihar
- In office 28 January 2024 – 26 February 2025
- Chief Minister: Nitish Kumar
- Preceded by: Tej Pratap Yadav
- Succeeded by: Sunil Kumar

Minister of Agriculture Government of Bihar
- In office 29 July 2017 – 16 November 2020
- Chief Minister: Nitish Kumar
- Preceded by: Ram Vichar Ray
- Succeeded by: Amrendra Pratap Singh

Leader of Opposition Bihar Legislative Assembly
- In office 4 December 2015 – 28 July 2017
- Chief Minister: Nitish Kumar
- Preceded by: Nand Kishore Yadav
- Succeeded by: Tejashwi Yadav

Minister of Urban Development & Housing Government of Bihar
- In office 26 November 2010 – 16 June 2013
- Chief Minister: Nitish Kumar
- Preceded by: Sushil Kumar Modi

Minister of Public Works Department Government of Bihar
- In office 13 April 2008 – 26 November 2010
- Chief Minister: Nitish Kumar
- Preceded by: Nand Kishore Yadav
- Succeeded by: Nand Kishore Yadav

Minister of Public Health Engineering Department Government of Bihar
- In office 24 November 2005 – 13 April 2008
- Chief Minister: Nitish Kumar
- Succeeded by: Ashwini Kumar Choubey

Member of Bihar Legislative Assembly
- Incumbent
- Assumed office 1990
- Preceded by: Jai Kumar Palit
- Constituency: Gaya Town

Personal details
- Born: Gaya, Bihar, India
- Party: Bharatiya Janata Party
- Spouse: Prabhawati Devi
- Children: 2
- Education: Magadh University MA, LLB, PhD (History)

Dr. Prem Kumar is an Indian politician who currently serves as the eighteenth Speaker of the Bihar Legislative Assembly since 2025. He is a member of Bihar Legislative Assembly elected nine times from Gaya Town assembly constituency.

== Education career ==
He has completed his PhD from Magadh University in 1999.

== Political career ==
Kumar was elected as the leader of the opposition in the Bihar assembly formed after assembly election in October 2015.

Prem Kumar was elected unanimously as Bihar Assembly Speaker on 1 December 2025.
