= List of ministers of panchayati raj of Bihar =

Panchayati Raj ministers of Bihar

The Ministers responsible for the Department of Panchayati Raj in the Government of Bihar, India have been:

#	Portrait	Name	Term			Chief Minister	Party
1		Narendra Narayan Yadav	24 November 2005	13 April 2008	20 years, 225 days	Nitish Kumar	Janata Dal (United)
2		Hari Prasad Sah	13 April 2008	3 October 2011	18 years, 85 days	Nitish Kumar	Janata Dal (United)
3		Bhim Singh	3 October 2011	20 May 2014	14 years, 277 days	Nitish Kumar	Janata Dal (United)
4		Vinod Prasad Yadav	20 May 2014	22 February 2015	12 years, 48 days	Jitan Ram Manjhi	Janata Dal (United)
5		Kapil Deo Kamat	20 November 2015	16 November 2020	10 years, 229 days	Nitish Kumar	Janata Dal (United)
6		Renu Devi	16 November 2020	9 February 2021	85 days	Nitish Kumar	Bharatiya Janata Party
7		Samrat Choudhary	9 February 2021	9 August 2022	1 year, 181 days	Nitish Kumar	Bharatiya Janata Party
8		Murari Prasad Gautam	16 August 2022	28 January 2024	3 years, 325 days	Nitish Kumar	Indian National Congress
9		Kedar Prasad Gupta	15 March 2024	20 November 2025	1 year, 250 days	Nitish Kumar	Bharatiya Janata Party
10		Deepak Prakash	20 November 2025	15 April 2026	146 days	Nitish Kumar	Rashtriya Lok Morcha
(7)		Samrat Choudhary	15 April 2026	07 May 2026	22 days	Himself	Bharatiya Janata Party
(10)		Deepak Prakash	07 May 2026	Incumbent	61 days	Samrat Choudhary	Rashtriya Lok Morcha

== See also ==
- List of ministers of finance of Bihar
- List of ministers of health of Bihar
- List of ministers of sports of Bihar
- List of ministers of education of Bihar
- List of ministers of transport of Bihar
- List of ministers of co-operatives of Bihar
- List of ministers of science and technology of Bihar
