= List of ministers of co-operatives of Bihar =

Co-operative ministers of Bihar

This is a list of co-operative ministers of Bihar, India.

== List ==
No.	Name	Took office	Left office	Chief Minister	Party
1	Ramdeo Singh Yadav	1990	1995	Lalu Prasad Yadav	Janata Dal
2	Ramjidas Rishidev	24 November 2005	13 April 2008	Nitish Kumar	Bhartiya Janta Party
3	Giriraj Singh	13 April 2008	26 November 2010	Nitish Kumar	Bhartiya Janta Party
4	Ramadhar Singh	26 November 2010	19 May 2011	Nitish Kumar	Bhartiya Janta Party
5	Sushil Kumar Modi	19 May 2011	26 August 2011	Nitish Kumar	Bhartiya Janta Party
6	Ramadhar Singh	26 August 2011	16 June 2013	Nitish Kumar	Bhartiya Janta Party
7	Nitish Kumar	16 June 2013	20 May 2014	Nitish Kumar	Janata Dal (United)
8	Nitish Mishra	20 May 2014	22 February 2015	Nitish Kumar	Janata Dal (United)
9	Ram Lakhan Ram Raman	22 February 2015	20 November 2015	Nitish Kumar	Janata Dal (United)
10	Alok Kumar Mehta	20 November 2015	26 July 2017	Nitish Kumar	Rashtriya Janata Dal
11	Rana Randhir	29 July 2017	16 November 2020	Nitish Kumar	Bhartiya Janta Party
12	Amrendra Pratap Singh	16 November 2020	9 February 2021	Nitish Kumar	Bhartiya Janta Party
13	Subhash Singh	9 February 2021	9 August 2022	Nitish Kumar	Bhartiya Janta Party
14	Surendra Prasad Yadav	16 August 2022	28 January 2024	Nitish Kumar	Rashtriya Janata Dal
15	Prem Kumar	28 January 2024	20 November 2025	Nitish Kumar	Bhartiya Janta Party
16	Pramod Chandravanshi	20 November 2025	15 April 2026	Nitish Kumar	Bhartiya Janta Party
17	Samrat Choudhary	15 April 2026	07 May 2026	Himself	Bhartiya Janta Party
18	Ram Kripal Yadav	07 May 2026	Incumbent	Samrat Choudhary	Bhartiya Janta Party

== See also ==
- Ministry of Co-operation
- List of ministers of finance of Bihar
- List of ministers of health of Bihar
- List of ministers of sports of Bihar
- List of ministers of education of Bihar
- List of ministers of transport of Bihar
- List of ministers of panchayati raj of Bihar
- List of ministers of science and technology of Bihar
