= Government of Bihar =

Indian State Government

- Parliamentary
- Seal of Bihar
- Seat of Government: Patna
- Country: India
- Website: state.bihar.gov.in

Legislative branch
- Assembly: Bihar Legislative Assembly
- Speaker of the House: Prem Kumar
- Deputy Speaker of the House: Narendra Narayan Yadav
- Members in Assembly: 243
- Council: Bihar Legislative Council
- Chairperson of Council: Awadhesh Narain Singh
- Members in Council: 75 (63 Elected + 12 Nominated)

Executive branch
- Governor (Head of the State): Syed Ata Hasnain
- Chief Minister (Head of Government): Samrat Choudhary, BJP
- Deputy Chief Minister (Deputy Head of Government): Vijay Kumar Chaudhary, JD(U); Bijendra Prasad Yadav, JD(U)
- Chief Secretary (Head of Civil Service): Pratyaya Amrit, (IAS)

Judiciary
- High Court: Patna High Court
- Chief Justice: Justice Sudhir Singh (Acting)
- Seat: 53

The Government of Bihar or locally as the Bihar Government is the state government of the Indian state of Bihar and its nine divisions which consist of districts. It consists of an executive, led by the Governor of Bihar, a judiciary and legislative branches.

Like other states in India, the head of state of Bihar is the Governor, appointed by the President of India on the advice of the central government. The head of state is largely ceremonial. The Chief Minister is the head of government and is vested with most of the executive powers. Patna is the capital of Bihar hence, it serves as the headquarter for almost all the departments.

The Patna High Court, located in Patna, has jurisdiction over the whole state. The present legislative structure of Bihar is bicameral. The Legislative houses are the Bihar Vidhan Sabha (Bihar Legislative Assembly) and Bihar Vidhan Parishad (Bihar Legislative Council). Their normal term is five years, unless dissolved earlier.

== Executive ==
=== Governor ===
The Governors of the states of India have similar powers and functions at the state level as those of the President of India at Union level. Governors exist in the states while lieutenant governors or administrator exist in union territories. According to the Constitution of India, the Governor is a state's head, but de facto executive authority rests with the chief minister. The governor acts as the nominal head whereas the real power lies with the Chief ministers of the states and his/her councils of ministers. The Governor of a State is appointed by the President of India. The factors based on which the President evaluates the candidates is not mentioned in the Constitution. In his ex-officio capacity, the Governor of Bihar is Chancellor of the universities of Bihar (at present 12) as per the Acts of the Universities.

=== Chief Minister ===
In the Republic of India, a chief minister is the elected head of government of the each state out of 28 states and sometimes a union territory (currently, only the UTs of Delhi, Puducherry and Jammu and Kashmir have serving Chief Ministers). Following elections to the Bihar Legislative Assembly, the governor usually invites the party (or coalition) with a majority of seats to form the government. The governor appoints the chief minister, whose council of ministers are collectively responsible to the assembly. Given that he has the confidence of the assembly, the chief minister's term is for five years and is subject to no term limits.

In 1946 First Cabinet of Bihar formed; consisting of two members, Dr. Sri Krishna Sinha as first Chief Minister of Bihar and Dr. Anugrah Narayan Sinha as Bihar's first Deputy Chief Minister cum Finance Minister (also in charge of Labour, Health, Agriculture and Irrigation). Other ministers were inducted later. The cabinet served as the first Bihar Government after independence in 1947. From 1946, 23 people have been Chief Minister of Bihar. The inaugural holder was Sri Krishna Sinha of the Indian National Congress, he also has the longest incumbency. The current incumbent is Samrat Choudhary who is having incumbency since 15 April 2026.

=== Deputy Chief Minister ===
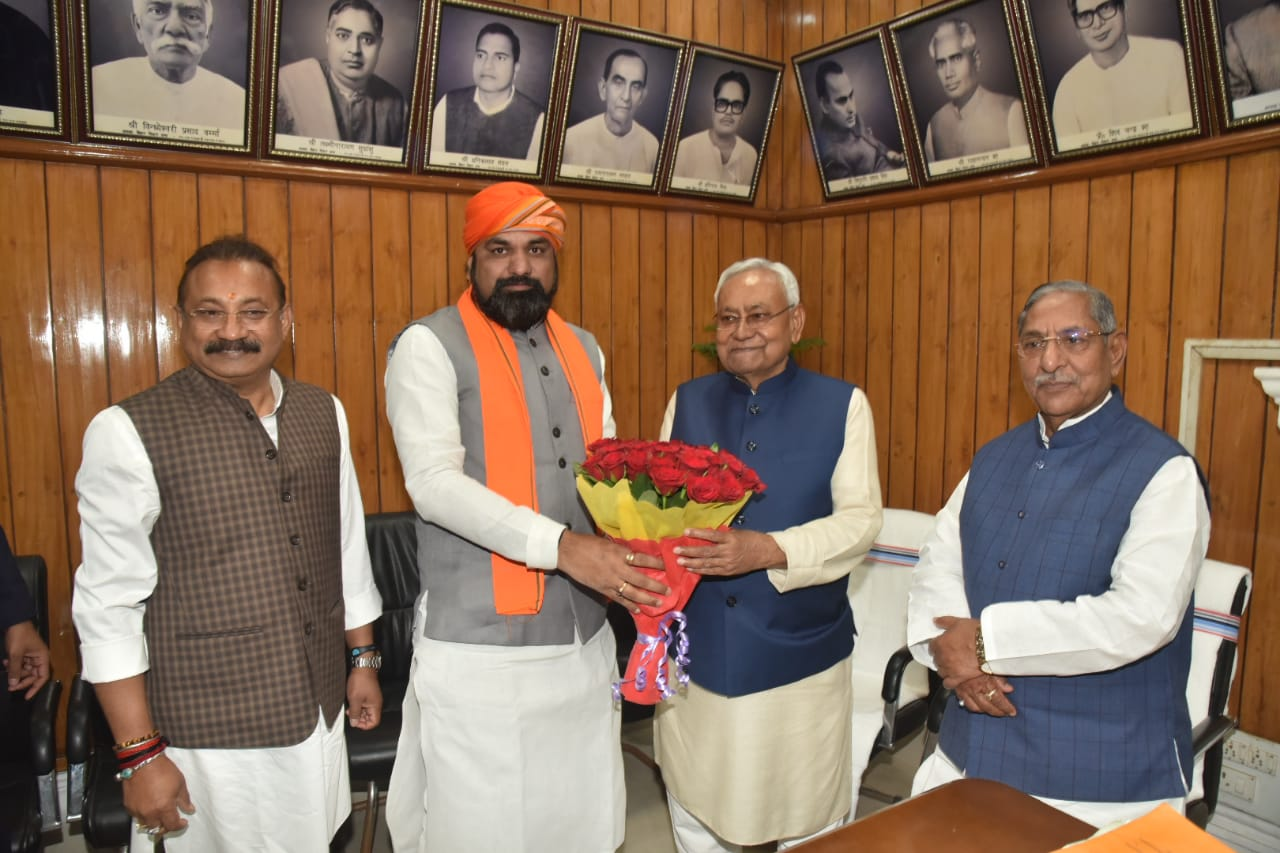
Chief Minister of Bihar, Samrat Chaudhary meeting with longest serving Chief Minister of Bihar, Nitish Kumar in 2024.

Despite being not mentioned in the constitution or law, the Deputy-Chief minister office is often used to pacify factions within the party or coalition. It is similar to the rarely used Deputy-Prime minister post in Central government of India. During the absence of the Chief minister, the deputy-CM may chair cabinet meetings and lead the Assembly majority. Various deputy chief ministers have also taken the oath of secrecy in line with the one that chief minister takes. This oath has also sparked controversies.

=== Ministry ===
The government is headed by the governor who appoints the chief minister and his council of ministers. The governor is appointed for five years and acts as the constitutional head of the state. Even though the governor remains the ceremonial head of the state, the day-to-day running of the government is taken care of by the chief minister and his council of ministers in whom a great deal of legislative powers is vested.. The secretariat headed by the secretary to the governor assists the council of ministers. The council of ministers consists of cabinet ministers, ministers of state and deputy ministers. The chief minister is assisted by the chief secretary, who is the head of the administrative services.

Portfolio	Minister	Took office	Left office	Party	Ref
Chief Minister; Home Affairs; General Administration; Cabinet Secretariat; Civil Aviation; Vigilance; Elections departments not allocated to any Minister	Samrat Choudhary	15 April 2026	Incumbent	BJP	
Deputy Chief Minister; Water Resources; Parliamentary Affairs	Vijay Kumar Chaudhary	15 April 2026	Incumbent	JD(U)	
Deputy Chief Minister; Finance; Commercial Taxes	Bijendra Prasad Yadav	15 April 2026	Incumbent	JD(U)	
Rural Development; Information and Public Relation
Rural Development; Information and Public Relation	Shrawan Kumar	7 May 2026	Incumbent	JD(U)	
Agriculture
Agriculture	Vijay Kumar Sinha	7 May 2026	Incumbent	BJP	
Revenue and Land Reforms
Revenue and Land Reforms	Dilip Jaiswal	7 May 2026	Incumbent	BJP	
Health and Family Welfare
Health and Family Welfare	Nishant Kumar	7 May 2026	Incumbent	JD(U)	
Building Construction
Building Construction	Leshi Singh	7 May 2026	Incumbent	JD(U)	
Co-operative
Co-operative	Ram Kripal Yadav	7 May 2026	Incumbent	BJP	
Housing and Urban Development; Information Technology
Housing and Urban Development; Information Technology	Nitish Mishra	7 May 2026	Incumbent	BJP	
Transport
Transport	Damodar Rawat	7 May 2026	Incumbent	JD(U)	
Higher Education; Law
Higher Education; Law	Sanjay Singh Tiger	7 May 2026	Incumbent	BJP	
Food and Consumer Protection
Food and Consumer Protection	Ashok Choudhary	7 May 2026	Incumbent	JD(U)	
Planning and Development
Planning and Development	Bhagwan Singh Kushwaha	7 May 2026	Incumbent	JD(U)	
Labour Resources & Migrant workers Welfare; Youth, Employment & Skill Development
Labour Resources & Migrant workers Welfare; Youth, Employment & Skill Development	Arun Shankar Prasad	7 May 2026	Incumbent	BJP	
Prohibition, Excise and Registration
Prohibition, Excise and Registration	Madan Sahni	7 May 2026	Incumbent	JD(U)	
Minor Water Resources
Minor Water Resources	Santosh Kumar Suman	7 May 2026	Incumbent	HAM(S)	
BC and EBC Welfare
BC and EBC Welfare	Rama Nishad	7 May 2026	Incumbent	BJP	
Disaster Management
Disaster Management	Ratnesh Sada	7 May 2026	Incumbent	JD(U)	
Road Construction
Road Construction	Kumar Shailendra	7 May 2026	Incumbent	BJP	
Science, Technology & Technical Education
Science, Technology & Technical Education	Sheela Mandal	7 May 2026	Incumbent	JD(U)	
Tourism
Tourism	Kedar Prasad Gupta	7 May 2026	Incumbent	BJP	
SC and ST Welfare
SC and ST Welfare	Lakhendra Raushan	7 May 2026	Incumbent	BJP	
Rural Works
Rural Works	Sunil Kumar	7 May 2026	Incumbent	JD(U)	
Industries; Sports
Industries; Sports	Shreyashi Singh	7 May 2026	Incumbent	BJP	
Minority Welfare
Minority Welfare	Mohd Zama Khan	7 May 2026	Incumbent	JD(U)	
Dairy, Fisheries and Animal Resources
Dairy, Fisheries and Animal Resources	Nand Kishor Ram	7 May 2026	Incumbent	BJP	
Energy
Energy	Shailesh Kumar Mandal	7 May 2026	Incumbent	JD(U)	
Mining and Geology; Art and Culture
Mining and Geology; Art and Culture	Pramod Kumar Chandravanshi	7 May 2026	Incumbent	BJP	
Social Welfare
Social Welfare	Shweta Gupta	7 May 2026	Incumbent	JD(U)	
Education
Education	Mithlesh Tiwari	7 May 2026	Incumbent	BJP	
Environment, Forest and Climate Change
Environment, Forest and Climate Change	Ramchandra Prasad	7 May 2026	Incumbent	BJP	
Public Health Engineering
Public Health Engineering	Sanjay Kumar Singh	7 May 2026	Incumbent	LJP(RV)	
Sugarcane Industries
Sugarcane Industries	Sanjay Kumar Paswan	7 May 2026	Incumbent	LJP(RV)	
Panchayati Raj
Panchayati Raj	Deepak Prakash	7 May 2026	Incumbent	RLM	

== Legislature ==
State governments in India are the governments ruling states of India and the chief minister heads the state government. Power is divided between union government and state governments. State government's legislature is bicameral in 6 states and unicameral in the rest. Bihar is one of the six states where bicameral legislature exists. Other states are Uttar Pradesh, Karnataka, Maharashtra, Telangana and Andhra Pradesh. The Bihar Legislative Council is Vidhan Parishad serves as the upper house and Bihar Legislative Assembly is Vidhan Sabha serves as the lower house of the bicameral legislature of the Indian state of Bihar. Lower house is elected with 5 years term, while in upper house 1/3 of the total members in the house gets elected every two years with six-year term.

=== Vidhan Sabha ===
The Vidhan Sabha is also known as Legislative Assembly. The Bihar Legislative Assembly first came into being in 1937 and not a permanent body and subject to dissolution. The tenure of the Legislative Assembly is five years from the date appointed for its first sitting unless dissolved sooner. Members of the Legislative Assembly are directly elected by the people. There are three sessions (Budget session, Monsoon session, Winter session) every year. The Sessions of Legislative Assembly are presided by Speaker. The Speaker certifies that whether a bill is ordinary bill or money bill. Generally he does not participate in voting but he casts his vote in the case of tie. The current strength of the House is 243.

=== Vidhan Parishad ===
The Vidhan Parishad is also known as Legislative Council. Bihar Legislative Council is a permanent body and not subject to dissolution. But as nearly as possible, one-third of the members thereof retire as soon as may be on the expiration of every second year. Members are now elected or nominated for six years and one-third of them retire every second year. The presiding officers of Vidhan Parishad are now known as chairman and deputy chairman. Members of the upper house, the Legislative Council are indirectly elected through an electoral college. There are 27 Committees which are, at present, functional in the council. Besides, there are three Financial Committees consisting of the members of the two Houses of the State Legislature.

== Judiciary ==
=== High Court ===
The Patna High Court (Hindi: पटना उच्च न्यायालय) is the High Court of the state of Bihar. The Patna High Court is the principal court of the state of Bihar. However, a high court exercises its original civil and criminal jurisdiction only if the subordinate courts are not authorized by law to try such matters for lack of pecuniary, territorial jurisdiction. High courts may also enjoy original jurisdiction in certain matters, if so designated Specially in a state or federal law It was established on February 3, 1916, and later affiliated under the Government of India Act 1915 (5 & 6 Geo. 5. c. 61). The court is headquartered in Patna, the administrative capital of the state. A proclamation was made by the Governor-General of India on 22 March 1912. The foundation-stone of the High Court Building was laid on 1 December 1913 by the late Viceroy and Governor-General of India, Sir Charles Hardinge of Penshurst. The Patna High Court building on its completion was formally opened by the same Viceroy on 3 February 1916. Hon. Sir Justice Edward Maynard Des Champs Chamier was the first Chief Justice of Patna High Court. This High Court has given two Chief Justices of India: Hon'ble Mr. Justice Bhuvaneshwar Prasad Sinha, the 6th C.J.I., and Hon. Mr. Justice Lalit Mohan Sharma, the 24th C.J.I.. Hon. Mr Justice Sudhir Singh is the current Acting Chief Justice of Patna High Court. Patna High Court has strength of 53 Judges which includes 40 permanent and 13 additional judges.

=== District Courts ===
The District Courts of India are the district courts of the State governments in India for every district or for one or more districts together taking into account of the number of cases, population distribution in the district. They administer justice in India at a district level. Bihar has 37 district courts in total.

The Civil Court/District Court is judged by District and Sessions Judge. It is the principal court of original civil jurisdiction besides the High Court of the State and which derives its jurisdiction in civil matters primarily from the code of civil procedure. The district court is also a court of sessions when it exercises its jurisdiction on criminal matters under the Code of Criminal Procedure. The district court is presided over by a district judge appointed by the state governor with on the advice of chief justice of that high court. In addition to the district judge there are a number of additional district and sessions judges and assistant district judges. The additional district judge and the court presided over by the additional district judge have equivalent rank, status and jurisdiction as the district judge and presiding court. Assistant sessions judge is subordinate to the district judge and additional(s).

== Elections and Politics ==
India has a quasi-federal form of government, called "union" or "central" government, with elected officials at the union, state and local levels. At the national level, the head of government, the prime minister, is appointed by the president of India from the party or coalition that has the majority of seats in the Lok Sabha. The members of the Lok Sabha (Center) and Bihar Vidhan Sabha are directly elected for a term of five years by universal adult suffrage through a first-past-the-post voting system. Members of the Rajya Sabha, which represents the states, are elected by the members of State legislative assemblies by proportional representation, except for 12 members who are nominated by the president. In Bihar Vidhan Parishad, 1/3 of the total members in the house gets elected every 2 years with 6-year term.

As of 2023, there are two main political formations: the National Democratic Alliance (NDA) which comprises Bharatiya Janata Party (BJP, Indian People's Party), Lok Janshakti Party (Ram Vilas) (LJP (RV)) and Rashtriya Lok Janshakti Party (RLJP); and a second alliance between Rashtriya Janata Dal (RJD, National People's Party), Hindustani Awam Morcha, Rashtriya Lok Janata Dal and Indian National Congress (INC). There are many other political formations. The Communist Party of India had a strong presence in Bihar at one time, which has since weakened. The Communist Party of India (Marxist) CPI(M) and CPM and All India Forward Bloc (AIFB) have a minor presence, along with the other extreme leftist parties.

== Administration and Local governments ==
Local governments function at the basic level. It is the third level of government apart from union and state governments. It consists of panchayats in rural areas and municipalities in urban areas. They are elected directly or indirectly by the people. Structurally Bihar is divided into divisions (Pramandal), districts (Zila), sub-divisions (Anumandal) & circles (Aanchal).The state is divided into nine divisions, 38 districts, 101 subdivisions and 534 circles. 17 municipal corporations, 84 Nagar Parishads and 151 Nagar Panchayats, for administrative purposes.

India
Bihar
Divisions
Districts
Blocks (Tehsils)	Municipal Corporations (Nagar Nigam)	Municipal Councils (Nagar Parishad)	Town Council (Nagar Panchayat)
Villages (Graam/Gau'n)	Wards

== Government agencies ==
- Information and Public Relations Department, Bihar
- Infrastructure Development Authority, Patna

== See also ==
- Administration in Bihar
- List of deputy chief ministers of Bihar
- Government of India
- Bihar Economic Survey
- Bihar Industrial Area Development Authority
