= List of ministers of health of Bihar =

Health ministers of Bihar

The Ministers responsible for the Ministry of Health and Family Welfare in the Government of Bihar, India have been:

| # | Portrait | Name | Term | | | Chief Minister | Party |
|---|---|---|---|---|---|---|---|
| 1 | | Anugrah Narayan Sinha | 2 April 1946 | 5 July 1957 | | Shri Krishna Sinha | Indian National Congress |
| 2 | | Mohammad Yunus | | | | | Indian National Congress |
| 3 | | Dr. B P Jawahar | | | | Mahamaya Prasad Sinha | |
| 4 | | Abdul Gafoor | 2 July 1973 | 27 September 1973 | | Abdul Gafoor | Indian National Congress |
| 5 | | Kedar Pandey | 27 September 1973 | 11 April 1975 | | Abdul Gafoor | Indian National Congress |
| 6 | | Bindeshwari Dubey | 11 April 1975 | 30 April 1977 | | Jagannath Mishra | Indian National Congress |
| 7 | | Jabir Husain | 24 June 1977 | 21 April 1979 | | Karpoori Thakur | Janata Party |
| 8 | | Braj Kishor Singh | 9 March 1982 | 11 April 1985 | | Chandra Shekhar Singh | Indian National Congress |
| 9 | | Dinesh Singh | 12 March 1985 | 14 February 1988 | | Bindeshwari Dubey | Indian National Congress |
| 10 | | Mangal Singh Lamay | 10 March 1990 | | | Lalu Yadav | Janata Dal |
| 11 | | Umeshwar Prasad Verma | | | | | |
| 12 | | Mahaveer Prasad | 25 July 1997 | 9 March 1999 | | Rabri Devi | Rashtriya Janata Dal |
| 13 | | Udit Rai | 9 March 1999 | 2 March 2000 | | Rabri Devi | Rashtriya Janata Dal |
| 14 | | Shakeel Ahmad | 2 April 2000 | May 2004 | | Rabri Devi | Indian National Congress |
| 15 | | Chandra Mohan Rai | 24 November 2005 | 13 April 2008 | 2 years, 141 days | Nitish Kumar | Bharatiya Janata Party |
| 16 | | Nand Kishore Yadav | 13 April 2008 | 24 November 2010 | 2 years, 225 days | Nitish Kumar | Bharatiya Janata Party |
| 17 | | Ashwini Kumar Choubey | 26 November 2010 | 16 June 2013 | 2 years, 202 days | Nitish Kumar | Bharatiya Janata Party |
| 18 | | Tej Pratap Yadav | 20 November 2015 | 26 July 2017 | 1 year, 248 days | Nitish Kumar | Rashtriya Janata Dal |
| 19 | | Mangal Pandey | 29 July 2017 | 9 August 2022 | 5 years, 11 days | Nitish Kumar | Bharatiya Janata Party |
| 20 | | Tejashwi Yadav | 10 August 2022 | 28 January 2024 | 1 year, 171 days | Nitish Kumar | Rashtriya Janata Dal |
| (19) | | Mangal Pandey | 28 January 2024 | 15 April 2026 | 2 years, 124 days | Nitish Kumar | Bharatiya Janata Party |
| 21 | | Samrat Choudhary | 15 April 2026 | 7 May 2026 | 22 days | Himself | Bharatiya Janata Party |
| 22 | | Nishant Kumar | 7 May 2026 | Incumbent | 25 days | Samrat Choudhary | Janata Dal (United) |

== See also ==
- List of ministers of finance of Bihar
- List of ministers of panchayati raj of Bihar
- List of ministers of sports of Bihar
- List of ministers of education of Bihar
- List of ministers of transport of Bihar
- List of ministers of co-operatives of Bihar
- List of ministers of science and technology of Bihar
