= List of ministers of transport of Bihar =

Transport ministers of Bihar

This is a list of transport ministers of Bihar; which function as heads of the Indian state of Bihar's Ministry of Transport and members of the Bihar government's cabinet.

#	Name	Took office	Left office	Chief Minister	Party
1	Mahesh Prasad Singh			Shri Krishna Singh	Congress
2	Rafique Alam	28 May 1973	24 June 1973	Kedar Pandey	Congress
3	Shatrughan Sharan Singh	2 July 1973	25 September 1973	Abdul Gafoor	Congress
4	Bindeshwari Dubey	25 September 1973	18 April 1974	Abdul Gafoor	Congress
5	Shakeel Uzzaman Ansari	12 March 1985	14 February 1990	Bindeshwari Dubey	Congress
6	Shanker Prasad Tekriwal	2 April 2000		Rabri Devi	Rashtriya Janata Dal
7	Ajit Kumar	24 November 2005	13 April 2008	Nitish Kumar	Janata Dal (United)
8	Ramanand Prasad Singh	13 April 2008	2010	Nitish Kumar	Janata Dal (United)
9	Brishin Patel	26 November 2010	20 May 2014	Nitish Kumar	Janata Dal (United)
10	Brishin Patel	20 May 2014	22 February 2015	Jitan Ram Manjhi	Janata Dal (United)
11	Dulal Chandra Goswami	22 February 2015	20 November 2015	Nitish Kumar	Janata Dal (United)
12	Chandrika Roy	20 November 2015	26 July 2017	Nitish Kumar	Janata Dal (United)
13	Santosh Kumar Nirala	29 July 2017	16 November 2020	Nitish Kumar	Janata Dal (United)
14	Sheela Kumari	16 November 2020	20 November 2025	Nitish Kumar	Janata Dal (United)
15	Shrawan Kumar	20 November 2025	15 April 2026	Nitish Kumar	Janata Dal (United)
16	Vijay Kumar Chaudhary	15 April 2026	07 May 2026	Samrat Choudhary	Janata Dal (United)
17	Damodar Rawat	07 May 2026	present	Samrat Choudhary	Janata Dal (United)

== See also ==
- List of ministers of finance of Bihar
- List of ministers of health of Bihar
- List of ministers of sports of Bihar
- List of ministers of education of Bihar
- List of ministers of panchayati raj of Bihar
- List of ministers of co-operatives of Bihar
- List of ministers of science and technology of Bihar
