= List of ministers of finance of Bihar =

The Finance Department, Government of Bihar is responsible for management of finances of the State Government. It overlooks all the economic and financial matters related to the state of Bihar, India. This is a list of the Finance ministers of Bihar.

No.	Portrait	Name	Tenure			Chief Minister	Party
1		Anugrah Narayan Sinha	2 April 1946	5 July 1957		Shri Krishna Sinha	Indian National Congress
2		Shri Krishna Sinha	5 July 1957	31 January 1961		Shri Krishna Sinha	Indian National Congress
3		Deep Narayan Singh	1 February 1961	18 February 1961		Deep Narayan Singh	Indian National Congress
4		Mahesh Prasad Singh	1963	1967			Indian National Congress
5		Karpoori Thakur	5 March 1967	28 January 1968		Mahamaya Prasad Sinha	Socialist Party
6		Satish Prasad Singh	28 January 1968	1 February 1968		Satish Prasad Singh	Indian National Congress
7		Krishna Kant Singh	22 March 1968	29 March 1972		Bhola Paswan Shastri	Indian National Congress
8		Daroga Prasad Rai	March 1972	April 1975			Indian National Congress
9		Basawon Singh	April 1975	April 1977			Indian National Congress
10		Kailashpati Mishra	April 1977	April 1979		Karpuri Thakur	Janata Party
11		Jagannath Mishra	June 1980	April 1983		Jagannath Mishra	Indian National Congress
12		Bindeshwari Dubey	March 1985	Feb 1988		Bindeshwari Dubey	Indian National Congress
(11)		Jagannath Mishra	December 1989	March 1990		Jagannath Mishra	Indian National Congress
13		Lalu Prasad Yadav	March 1990	March 1995		Lalu Prasad Yadav	Janata Dal
13		Lalu Prasad Yadav	April 1995	July 1997		Lalu Prasad Yadav	Rashtriya Janata Dal
14		Rabri Devi	July 1997	February 1999		Rabri Devi	Rashtriya Janata Dal
14		Rabri Devi	March 1999	March 2000		Rabri Devi	Rashtriya Janata Dal
15		Nitish Kumar	3 March 2000	10 March 2000		Nitish Kumar	Samata Party
(14)		Rabri Devi	March 2000	February 2005		Rabri Devi	Rashtriya Janata Dal
16		Sushil Kumar Modi	24 November 2005	16 June 2013	7 years, 204 days	Nitish Kumar	Bharatiya Janata Party
(15)		Nitish Kumar	17 June 2013	20 May 2014	337 days	Nitish Kumar	Janata Dal (United)
17		Bijendra Prasad Yadav	20 May 2014	20 November 2015	1 year, 184 days	Jitan Ram Manjhi	Janata Dal (United)
18		Abdul Bari Siddiqui	20 November 2015	27 July 2017	1 year, 249 days	Nitish Kumar	Rashtriya Janata Dal
(16)		Sushil Kumar Modi	27 July 2017	16 November 2020	3 years, 112 days	Nitish Kumar	Bharatiya Janata Party
19		Tarkishore Prasad	16 November 2020	9 August 2022	1 year, 266 days	Nitish Kumar	Bharatiya Janata Party
20		Vijay Kumar Chaudhary	16 August 2022	28 January 2024	1 year, 165 days	Nitish Kumar	Janata Dal (United)
21		Samrat Chaudhary	28 January 2024	20 November 2025	1 year, 296 days	Nitish Kumar	Bharatiya Janata Party
(17)		Bijendra Prasad Yadav	20 November 2025	Incumbent	299 days	Samrat Choudhary	Janata Dal (United)

== See also ==
- List of chief ministers of Bihar
- List of ministers of home of Bihar
- List of ministers of law of Bihar
- List of ministers of panchayati raj of Bihar
- List of ministers of health of Bihar
- List of ministers of sports of Bihar
- List of ministers of education of Bihar
- List of ministers of transport of Bihar
- List of ministers of co-operatives of Bihar
- List of ministers of science and technology of Bihar
