= List of ministers of science and technology of Bihar =

Science and technology ministers of Bihar

This is a list of Science and Technology Ministers of Bihar, India.

Name	Took office	Left office	Chief Minister	Party
Bindeshwari Dubey	11 April 1975	30 April 1977	Jagannath Mishra	Indian National Congress
Shyam Sunder Singh Dheeraj	1980	1981	Jagannath Mishra	Indian National Congress
Sami Nadvi	1981	1983	Jagannath Mishra	Indian National Congress
L.P. Shahi	1983	1985	Chandrashekhar Singh	Indian National Congress
Vijay Kumar Singh	1985	1988	Bindeshwari Dubey	Indian National Congress
Chandrika Roy	2000	2000	Rabari Devi	Rashtriya Janata Dal
Dr. Anil Kumar	2005	2008	Nitish Kumar	Janata Dal (United)
Shahid Ali Khan	2008	2010	Nitish Kumar	Janata Dal (United)
Gautam Singh	2010	2014	Nitish Kumar	Janata Dal (United)
Ashok Choudhary	2015	2017	Nitish Kumar	Indian National Congress
Jai Kumar Singh	2017	9 August 2022	Nitish Kumar	Janata Dal (United)
Sumit Kumar Singh	9 August 2022	20 November 2025	Nitish Kumar	Janata Dal (United)
Sunil Kumar	20 November 2025	15 April 2026	Nitish Kumar	Janata Dal (United)
Vijay Kumar Chaudhary	15 April 2026	07 May 2026	Samrat Choudhary	Janata Dal (United)
Sheela Mandal	07 May 2026	present	Samrat Choudhary	Janata Dal (United)

== See also ==
- Department of Science and Technology, Bihar
- Government of Bihar
- List of ministers of finance of Bihar
- List of ministers of health of Bihar
- List of ministers of sports of Bihar
- List of ministers of education of Bihar
- List of ministers of transport of Bihar
- List of ministers of co-operatives of Bihar
- List of ministers of panchayati raj of Bihar
