= List of ministers of education of Bihar =

This is a list of education ministers of Bihar, India.

== List ==
No.	Name	Took office	Left office	Chief Minister	Party
1	Acharya Badrinath Verma			Krishna Singh	Congress
2	Satyendra Narayan Sinha	1961	1963	Not provided	Congress
3	Satyendra Narayan Sinha	1963	1967	K. B. Sahay	Congress
4	Karpoori Thakur	1967	1968	Mahamaya Prasad Sinha	Jana Kranti Dal
5	Satish Prasad Singh	1968	1968	Satish Prasad Singh	Congress
6	Dr. Ramrajsingh	1969	1972	Karpoori Thakur	Congress
7	Bindeshwari Dubey	28 May 1973	24 June 1973	Kedar Pandey	Congress
8	Vidyakaar Kavi	1973	1973	Abdul Ghafoor	Congress
9	Dr. Ramraj singh	1973	1977	Jagannath Mishra, Abdul Ghafoor	Congress
10	Nasiruddin Haider Khan	1980	1981	Jagannath Mishra	Congress
11	Karamchand Bhagat	1981	1983	Jagannath Mishra	Congress
12	Nagendra Jha	1983	1985	Chandrashekhar Singh	Congress
13	Uma Pandey			Bindeshwari Dubey	Congress
14	Lokesh Nath Jha			Bindeshwari Dubey	Congress
15	Nagendra Jha	1988	1989	Bhagwat Jha Azad	Congress
16	Diwakar Prasad Singh	1996	1996	Laloo Prasad Yadav	Rashtriya Janata Dal
17	Jay Prakash Narayan Yadav	1999	2000	Rabri Devi	Rashtriya Janata Dal
18	Ram lashan ram raman	2001	2004	Rabri Devi	Rashtriya Janata Dal
19	Brishin Patel	2005	2008	Nitish Kumar	Janata Dal (United)
20	Hari Narayan Singh	2008	2010	Nitish Kumar	Janata Dal (United)
21	Prashant Kumar Shahi	2010	2014	Nitish Kumar	Janata Dal (United)
22	Prashant Kumar Sahi	2014	2015	Jitan Ram Manjhi	Janata Dal (United)
23	Ashok Choudhary	2015	2017	Nitish Kumar	Congress
24	Krishna Nandan Prasad Verma	2017	2020	Nitish Kumar	Janata Dal (United)
25	Vijay Kumar Chaudhary	2020	2022	Nitish Kumar	Janata Dal (United)
26	Chandrashekhar Yadav	2022	2023	Nitish Kumar	Rashtriya Janata Dal
27	Alok Kumar Mehta	2024	2024	Nitish Kumar	Rashtriya Janata Dal
28	Vijay Kumar Chaudhary	2024	2024	Nitish Kumar	Janata Dal (United)
29	Sunil Kumar	15 March 2024	15 April 2026	Nitish Kumar	Janata Dal (United)
28	Vijay Kumar Chaudhary	15 April 2026	07 May 2026	Samrat Choudhary	Janata Dal (United)
29	Mithlesh Tiwari	07 May 2026	present	Samrat Choudhary	Bharatiya Janata Party

== See also ==
- List of ministers of finance of Bihar
- List of ministers of health of Bihar
- List of ministers of sports of Bihar
- List of ministers of panchayati raj of Bihar
- List of ministers of transport of Bihar
- List of ministers of co-operatives of Bihar
- List of ministers of science and technology of Bihar
