= Choudhary ministry =

Current cabinet of the Government of Bihar

Samrat Choudhary ministry
- 42nd Ministry of the state of Bihar
- Incumbent
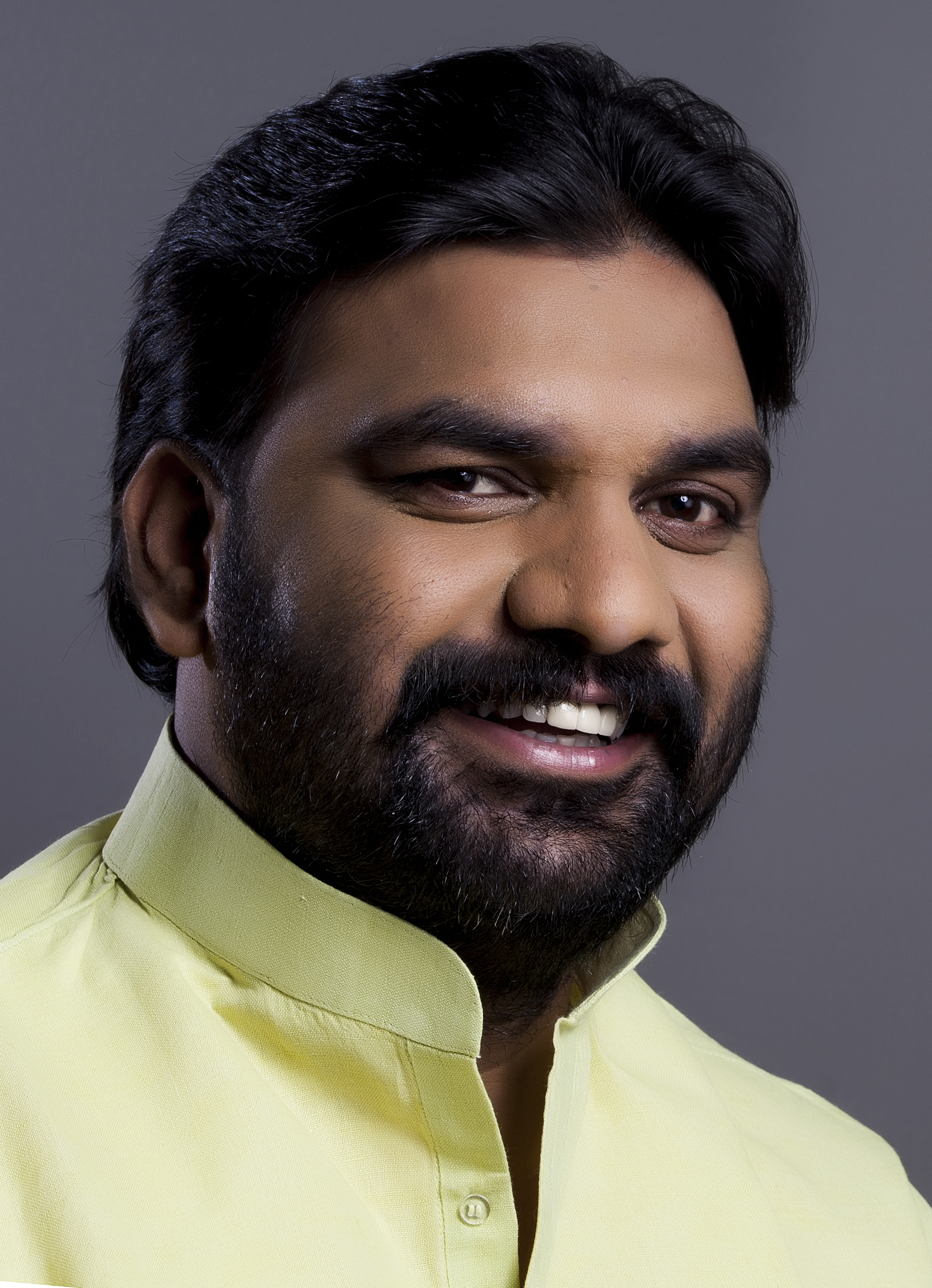
- Date formed: 15 April 2026

People and organisations
- Governor: Syed Ata Hasnain
- Chief Minister: Samrat Choudhary
- Deputy Chief Minister: Vijay Kumar Chaudhary; Bijendra Prasad Yadav
- No. of ministers: 35
- Member party: BJP (16); JD(U) (15); LJP(RV) (2); HAM(S) (1); RLM (1)
- Status in legislature: Majority government (coalition)
- Opposition parties: RJD
- Opposition leader: Rabri Devi (Council); Tejashwi Yadav (Assembly)

History
- Election: 2025
- Legislature term: 18th assembly
- Predecessor: Tenth Nitish Kumar ministry

Samrat Choudhary ministry is the current Council of Ministers of the Government of Bihar headed by Chief Minister Samrat Choudhary. The ministry was formed on 15 April 2026 following the resignation of Nitish Kumar, who was elected to the upper chamber of the union Parliament in March 2026.

The ministry represents the continuation of the National Democratic Alliance (NDA) government in Bihar under the maiden leadership of a Chief Minister belonging to the Bharatiya Janata Party.

== Demographics of the Council of Ministers ==
District	No. of Ministers	Ministers
Araria		
Arwal		
Aurangabad		
Banka		
Begusarai	1	Sanjay Kumar Paswan
Bhagalpur	2	Kumar Shailendra; Shailesh Kumar Mandal
Bhojpur	2	Sanjay Singh Tiger; Bhagwan Singh Kushwaha
Buxar		
Darbhanga	2	Ram Chandra Prasad; Madan Sahni
East Champaran		
Gaya	1	Santosh Kumar Suman
Gopalganj	2	Mithlesh Tiwari; Sunil Kumar
Jamui	2	Shreyashi Singh; Damodar Rawat
Jehanabad	1	Pramod Kumar Chandravanshi
Kaimur	1	Mohd Zama Khan
Katihar		
Khagaria		
Kishanganj	1	Dilip Kumar Jaiswal
Lakhisarai	1	Vijay Kumar Sinha
Madhepura		
Madhubani	3	Arun Shankar Prasad; Nitish Mishra; Sheela Mandal
Munger	1	Samrat Choudhary(Chief Minister)
Muzaffarpur	2	Rama Nishad; Kedar Prasad Gupta
Nalanda	2	Shrawan Kumar; Nishant Kumar
Nawada		
Patna	1	Ram Kripal Yadav
Purnea	1	Leshi Singh
Rohtas	1	Deepak Prakash
Saharsa	1	Ratnesh Sada
Samastipur	1	Vijay Kumar Chaudhary (Deputy Chief Minister)
Saran		
Sheikhpura	1	Ashok Choudhary
Sheohar	1	Shweta Gupta
Sitamarhi		
Siwan		
Supaul	1	Bijendra Prasad Yadav (Deputy Chief Minister)
Vaishali	2	Sanjay Kumar Singh; Lakhendra Kumar Raushan
West Champaran	1	Nand Kishor Ram
Total	35	

== History ==
In March 2026, Chief Minister Nitish Kumar announced that he would contest the 2026 Rajya Sabha elections and therefore resigned from office, ending his 20-year tenure. Subsequently, Samrat Choudhary was elected leader of the ruling alliance and sworn in as the Chief Minister of Bihar on 15 April 2026.

== Council of Ministers ==
Portfolio	Minister	Took office	Left office	Party	Ref
Chief Minister; Home Affairs; General Administration; Cabinet Secretariat; Civil Aviation; Vigilance; Elections departments not allocated to any Minister	Samrat Choudhary	15 April 2026	Incumbent	BJP	
Deputy Chief Minister; Water Resources; Parliamentary Affairs	Vijay Kumar Chaudhary	15 April 2026	Incumbent	JD(U)	
Deputy Chief Minister; Finance; Commercial Taxes	Bijendra Prasad Yadav	15 April 2026	Incumbent	JD(U)	
Rural Development; Information and Public Relation
Rural Development; Information and Public Relation	Shrawan Kumar	7 May 2026	Incumbent	JD(U)	
Agriculture
Agriculture	Vijay Kumar Sinha	7 May 2026	Incumbent	BJP	
Revenue and Land Reforms
Revenue and Land Reforms	Dilip Jaiswal	7 May 2026	Incumbent	BJP	
Health and Family Welfare
Health and Family Welfare	Nishant Kumar	7 May 2026	Incumbent	JD(U)	
Building Construction
Building Construction	Leshi Singh	7 May 2026	Incumbent	JD(U)	
Co-operative
Co-operative	Ram Kripal Yadav	7 May 2026	Incumbent	BJP	
Housing and Urban Development; Information Technology
Housing and Urban Development; Information Technology	Nitish Mishra	7 May 2026	Incumbent	BJP	
Transport
Transport	Damodar Rawat	7 May 2026	Incumbent	JD(U)	
Higher Education; Law
Higher Education; Law	Sanjay Singh Tiger	7 May 2026	Incumbent	BJP	
Food and Consumer Protection
Food and Consumer Protection	Ashok Choudhary	7 May 2026	Incumbent	JD(U)	
Planning and Development
Planning and Development	Bhagwan Singh Kushwaha	7 May 2026	Incumbent	JD(U)	
Labour Resources & Migrant workers Welfare; Youth, Employment & Skill Development
Labour Resources & Migrant workers Welfare; Youth, Employment & Skill Development	Arun Shankar Prasad	7 May 2026	Incumbent	BJP	
Prohibition, Excise and Registration
Prohibition, Excise and Registration	Madan Sahni	7 May 2026	Incumbent	JD(U)	
Minor Water Resources
Minor Water Resources	Santosh Kumar Suman	7 May 2026	Incumbent	HAM(S)	
BC and EBC Welfare
BC and EBC Welfare	Rama Nishad	7 May 2026	Incumbent	BJP	
Disaster Management
Disaster Management	Ratnesh Sada	7 May 2026	Incumbent	JD(U)	
Road Construction
Road Construction	Kumar Shailendra	7 May 2026	Incumbent	BJP	
Science, Technology & Technical Education
Science, Technology & Technical Education	Sheela Mandal	7 May 2026	Incumbent	JD(U)	
Tourism
Tourism	Kedar Prasad Gupta	7 May 2026	Incumbent	BJP	
SC and ST Welfare
SC and ST Welfare	Lakhendra Raushan	7 May 2026	Incumbent	BJP	
Rural Works
Rural Works	Sunil Kumar	7 May 2026	Incumbent	JD(U)	
Industries; Sports
Industries; Sports	Shreyashi Singh	7 May 2026	Incumbent	BJP	
Minority Welfare
Minority Welfare	Mohd Zama Khan	7 May 2026	Incumbent	JD(U)	
Dairy, Fisheries and Animal Resources
Dairy, Fisheries and Animal Resources	Nand Kishor Ram	7 May 2026	Incumbent	BJP	
Energy
Energy	Shailesh Kumar Mandal	7 May 2026	Incumbent	JD(U)	
Mining and Geology; Art and Culture
Mining and Geology; Art and Culture	Pramod Kumar Chandravanshi	7 May 2026	Incumbent	BJP	
Social Welfare
Social Welfare	Shweta Gupta	7 May 2026	Incumbent	JD(U)	
Education
Education	Mithlesh Tiwari	7 May 2026	Incumbent	BJP	
Environment, Forest and Climate Change
Environment, Forest and Climate Change	Ramchandra Prasad	7 May 2026	Incumbent	BJP	
Public Health Engineering
Public Health Engineering	Sanjay Kumar Singh	7 May 2026	Incumbent	LJP(RV)	
Sugarcane Industries
Sugarcane Industries	Sanjay Kumar Paswan	7 May 2026	Incumbent	LJP(RV)	
Panchayati Raj
Panchayati Raj	Deepak Prakash	7 May 2026	Incumbent	RLM	

== Legislature status ==
The government is a coalition led by the Bharatiya Janata Party in its first time heading a Government of Bihar as part of the National Democratic Alliance (NDA).

== See also ==
- Government of Bihar
- Bihar Legislative Assembly
- List of Chief Ministers of Bihar
- Tenth Nitish Kumar ministry
