= Tenth Nitish Kumar ministry =

Government of Bihar, India (2025–26)

- 41st Ministry of Bihar

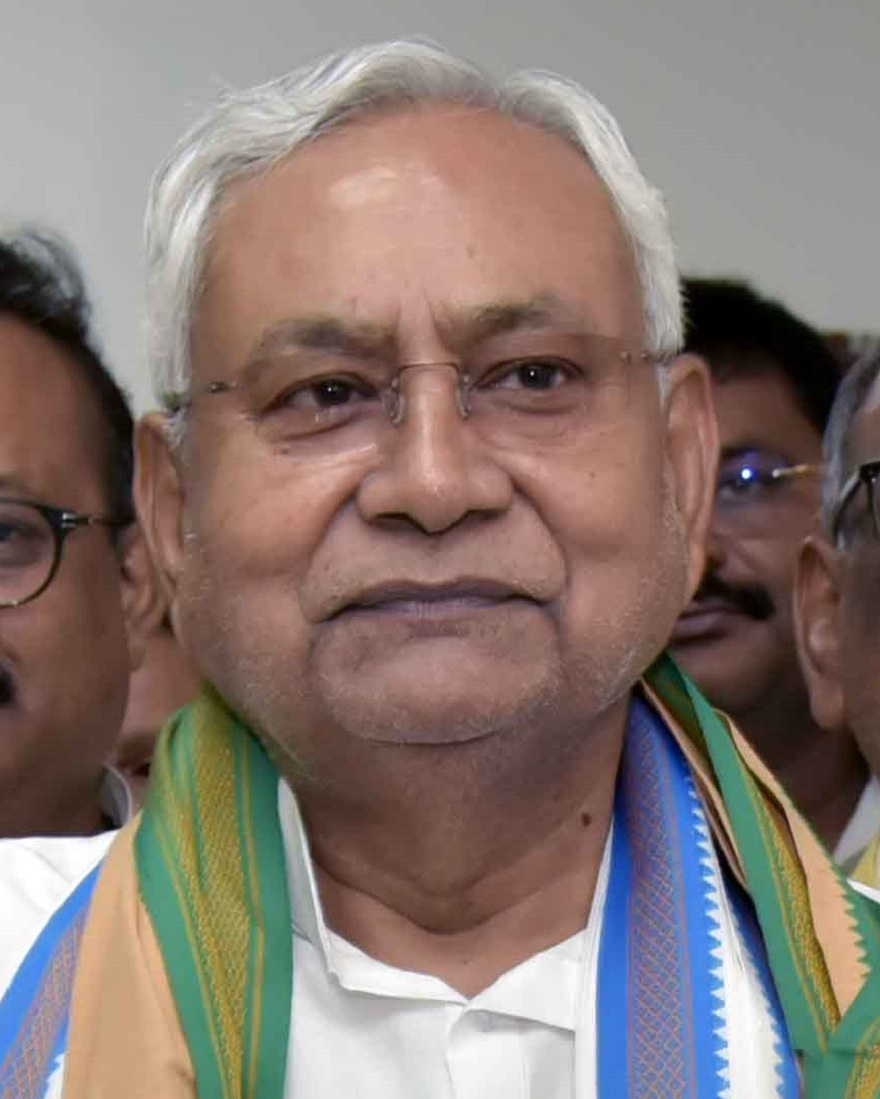
- Nitish Kumar; Hon'ble Chief Minister of Bihar
- Date formed: 20 November 2025
- Date dissolved: 14 April 2026

People and organisations
- Governor: Arif Mohammad Khan (till 13 March 2026), Syed Ata Hasnain (from 13 March 2026)
- Chief Minister: Nitish Kumar
- Deputy Chief Minister: Samrat Chaudhary; Vijay Kumar Sinha
- Member parties: BJP (14); JD(U) (9); LJP(RV) (2); HAM(S) (1); RLM (1)
- Status in legislature: Coalition
- Opposition party: RJD
- Opposition leader: Rabri Devi (Council); Tejashwi Yadav (Assembly)

History
- Election: 2025
- Legislature term: 341 days
- Predecessor: Ninth Nitish ministry
- Successor: Choudhary ministry

The Tenth Nitish Kumar ministry was the Council of Ministers in Bihar Legislative Assembly headed by Chief Minister Nitish Kumar. He was sworn in as the Chief Minister of Bihar on 20 November 2025 along with 26 Ministers.

The portfolios were allotted on 21 November 2025, in which BJP held the largest share in the cabinet with 14 ministerial berths, JD(U) with 9, LJP (Ram Vilas) with 2 berths, HAM and RLM with 1 berth each.

== Council of Ministers ==
Portfolio	Minister	Took office	Left office	Party	Ref
Chief Minister; General Administration; Cabinet Secretariat; Civil Aviation; Vigilance; Elections; Other departments not allocated to any Minister	Nitish Kumar	20 November 2025	14 April 2026	JD(U)	
Deputy Chief Minister; Home Affairs	Samrat Choudhary	20 November 2025	14 April 2026	BJP	
Deputy Chief Minister; Revenue & Land Reforms; Mines & Geology	Vijay Sinha	20 November 2025	14 April 2026	BJP	
Water Resources; Parliamentary Affairs; Information & Public Relations; Building Construction	Vijay Chaudhary	20 November 2025	14 April 2026	JD(U)	
Finance; Energy; Commercial Taxes; Planning & Development; Prohibition, Excise & Registration	Bijendra Yadav	20 November 2025	14 April 2026	JD(U)	
Rural Development; Transport	Shrawan Kumar	20 November 2025	14 April 2026	JD(U)	
Health; Law	Mangal Pandey	20 November 2025	14 April 2026	BJP	
Industries	Dilip Jaiswal	20 November 2025	14 April 2026	BJP	
Rural Works	Ashok Choudhary	20 November 2025	14 April 2026	JD(U)	
Food & Consumer Protection	Leshi Singh	20 November 2025	14 April 2026	JD(U)	
Road Construction	Nitin Nabin	20 November 2025	16 December 2025	BJP	
Road Construction	Dilip Jaiswal	16 December 2025	14 April 2026	BJP	
Urban Development & Housing	Nitin Nabin	20 November 2025	16 December 2025	BJP	
Urban Development & Housing	Vijay Sinha	16 December 2025	14 April 2026	BJP	
Social Welfare	Madan Sahni	20 November 2025	14 April 2026	JD(U)	
Agriculture	Ram Kripal Yadav	20 November 2025	14 April 2026	BJP	
Minor Water Resources	Santosh Suman	20 November 2025	14 April 2026	HAM(S)	
Education; Science, Technology & Technical Education	Sunil Kumar	20 November 2025	14 April 2026	JD(U)	
Higher Education	Sunil Kumar	12 December 2025	14 April 2026	JD(U)	
Minority Welfare	Mohd Zama Khan	20 November 2025	14 April 2026	JD(U)	
Labour Resources & Migrant Workers Welfare	Sanjay Singh Tiger	20 November 2025	14 April 2026	BJP	
Youth, Employment and Skill Development	Sanjay Singh Tiger	12 December 2025	14 April 2026	BJP	
Tourism; Art & Culture	Arun Shankar Prasad	20 November 2025	14 April 2026	BJP	
Diary Fisheries & Animal Resources	Surendra Mehta	20 November 2025	14 April 2026	BJP	
Disaster Management	Narayan Prasad	20 November 2025	14 April 2026	BJP	
BC & EBC Welfare	Rama Nishad	20 November 2025	14 April 2026	BJP	
SC & ST Welfare	Lakhendra Raushan	20 November 2025	14 April 2026	BJP	
Information Technology; Sports	Shreyasi Singh	20 November 2025	14 April 2026	BJP	
Co-operative; Environment, Forest & Climate Change	Pramod Chandravanshi	20 November 2025	14 April 2026	BJP	
Sugarcane Industries	Sanjay Paswan	20 November 2025	14 April 2026	LJP(RV)	
Public Health Engineering	Sanjay Kumar Singh	20 November 2025	14 April 2026	LJP(RV)	
Panchayati Raj	Deepak Prakash	20 November 2025	14 April 2026	RLM	

== See also ==
- Government of Bihar
- Bihar Legislative Assembly
- Bihar Legislative Council
- List of Chief Ministers of Bihar
- List of Deputy Chief Ministers of Bihar
- Ninth Nitish Kumar ministry
