= Mohd Zama Khan =

Indian politician

Mohammad Zama Khan
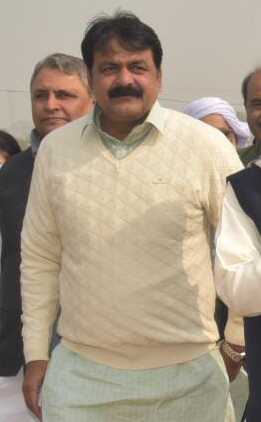

Minister of Minority Welfare Government of Bihar
- Incumbent
- Assumed office 07 May 2026
- Chief Minister: Samrat Choudhary
- Preceded by: Samrat Choudhary
- In office 9 February 2021 – 15 April 2026
- Preceded by: Ashok Choudhary
- Succeeded by: Vijay Kumar Chaudhary

Member of Bihar Legislative Assembly
- Incumbent
- Assumed office 10 November 2020
- Constituency: Chainpur

Personal details
- Born: 1973 (age 52–53) Naughra, Chainpur, Bhabhua, Bihar
- Party: Janata Dal (United)
- Other political affiliations: Bahujan Samaj Party, Indian National Congress
- Occupation: Agriculture, social worker, politician

Mohammad Zama Khan (abbr. Mohd Zama Khan) is an Indian politician from Kaimur district, Bihar. He is a member of the Bihar Legislative Assembly from Chainpur. He won on a Bahujan Samaj Party ticket by the Margin of nearly 35,000 votes in 2020. He later switched to the Janata Dal (United) and became the minister of Minority Affairs in the Seventh Nitish Kumar ministry. He was re-elected in a Janata Dal (United) ticket in 2025 by a margin of 8,362 votes and became a minister in Tenth Nitish Kumar ministry. He was re inducted in the Choudhary ministry.

Mohd Zama Khan drew widespread criticism after Bihar Chief Minister Nitish Kumar was caught on camera pulling down a woman’s niqab during a medical graduation ceremony. Defending the chief minister, Zama Khan was quoted as saying, “Nitish ji just showed love to a Muslim daughter. He wanted society to see the face of the girl after she became successful in life.”

His remarks intensified public outrage, with many arguing that forcibly removing a woman’s niqab—regardless of intent—was a violation of her personal choice, dignity, and religious freedom.
