= Shrawan Kumar (politician) =

Indian politician

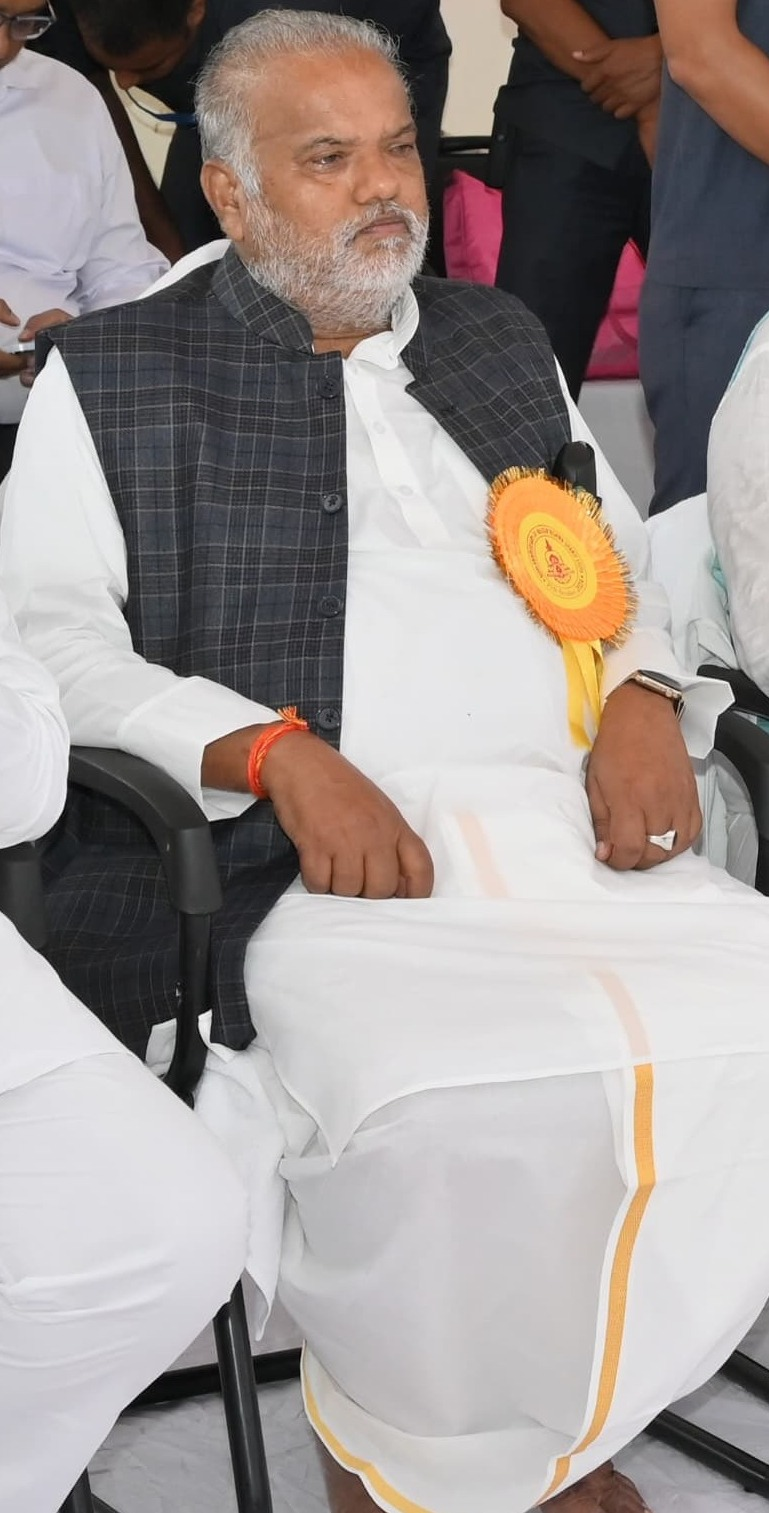

Cabinet Minister Government of Bihar
- Incumbent
- Assumed office 7 May 2026
- Chief Minister: Samrat Choudhary
- Ministry or Department: Rural Development; Information and Public Relations
- Preceded by: Vijay Kumar Chaudhary
- In office 28 January 2024 – 14 April 2026
- Chief Minister: Nitish Kumar
- Ministry or Department: Rural Development; Transport; Social Welfare; Food & Consumer Protection
- Preceded by: Himself; Madan Sahni; Leshi Singh; Sheela Kumari
- Succeeded by: Vijay Kumar Chaudhary

Member of Bihar Legislative Assembly
- Incumbent
- Assumed office 1995
- Preceded by: Ram Naresh Singh
- Constituency: Nalanda

Leader of JD(U) Legislature Party
- Incumbent
- Assumed office 20 April 2026
- Preceded by: Nitish Kumar

Personal details
- Born: 20 August 1957 (age 69) Nalanda, Bihar
- Party: Janata Dal United
- Spouse: Manju Kumari

Shrawan Kumar is an Indian politician from Janata Dal (United). He is currently serving as the minister of Rural Development and Information and Public Relations in the Government of Bihar under Chief Minister Samrat Choudhary. He previously served as the Minister of Rural Development and Transport in the Bihar Cabinet under Nitish Kumar.

His political career started with the JP Movement and has been an MLA from Nalanda constituency since 1995. He is the chief whip of Janata Dal (United) in Bihar Vidhan Sabha. He is considered close to Nitish Kumar and also member of Samata Party (now led by Uday Mandal its President).
