= Sunil Kumar (born 1960) =

Indian politician

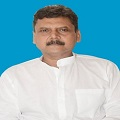

Minister of Rural works Government of Bihar
- Incumbent
- Assumed office 07 May 2026
- Chief Minister: Samrat Choudhary
- Preceded by: Bijendra Prasad Yadav

Minister of Education Government of Bihar
- In office 15 March 2024 – 15 April 2026
- Preceded by: Vijay Kumar Chaudhary
- Succeeded by: Vijay Kumar Chaudhary

Minister of Higher Education Government of Bihar
- In office 12 December 2025 – 15 April 2026
- Preceded by: position established
- Succeeded by: Vijay Kumar Chaudhary

Minister of Science, Technology and Technical Education Government of Bihar
- In office 20 November 2025 – 15 April 2026
- Preceded by: Sumit Kumar Singh
- Succeeded by: Vijay Kumar Chaudhary

Member of the Bihar Legislative Assembly
- Incumbent
- Assumed office 10 November 2020
- Preceded by: Anil Kumar
- Constituency: Bhore Vidhansabha

Personal details
- Born: Bihar, India
- Party: JD(U) (Since 2020)
- Education: St Stephen's College (D.U) (Master of Arts)
- Occupation: Former IPS Officer, Politician

Sunil Kumar (born 1960) is an Indian politician and former IPS officer. He is currently serving as the Rural Works Minister of Bihar. He previously served as Minister of Education Department, Minister of Science & Technology, Technical Education Department and Minister of Higher Education Department in the Government of Bihar. He is elected as Member of Bihar Legislative Assembly from Bhore. He also served as SSP for Patna district for more than 6 years from 1997. In 2020 he retired as the Director General-cum-Managing Director, Bihar Police Building Construction Corporation, after that he joined Janata Dal (United), political party. He did MA in History from St Stephen's College New Delhi in 1984.

== Indian Police Service Career ==
Sunil Kumar joined the Indian Police Service (IPS) in 1987 (Bihar Cadre) after clearing the UPSC Civil Services Examination and underwent training at the National Police Academy, Hyderabad.

Over a career spanning more than three decades, he held several senior and sensitive positions, including Senior Superintendent of Police (SSP), Patna. Known for his firm leadership and operational experience, he handled complex law-and-order challenges, elections, organized crime, and internal security situations.

He retired from the IPS in 2020 as Director General-cum-Managing Director, Bihar Police Building Construction Corporation, where he contributed significantly to strengthening police infrastructure across the state.

== Political career ==
After retirement from police service, Sunil Kumar entered active politics. In 2020, he was elected as MLA from Bhorey Vidhan Sabha constituency. He was appointed Minister for Prohibition Excise & Registration Department (Excise), Government of Bihar, where he strengthened enforcement infrastructure through the establishment of new excise police stations, check-posts, and registration offices, and implemented statewide surveillance and rapid-response mechanisms across all 42 districts.

In 2024, he assumed charge as Minister of Education Department, Government of Bihar, where he spearheaded systemic reforms, quality enhancement, digital transformation, and inclusive access to education across the state. His tenure was marked by a strong focus on governance, accountability, and outcome-oriented implementation.

In the 2025 Bihar Assembly Elections, he was re-elected from Bhorey with a substantial margin, reflecting strong public support. Following this mandate, he was re-appointed as Minister of Education and additionally entrusted with the Science & Technology, Technical Education, and Higher Education Departments, consolidating responsibility for Bihar’s Education and Innovation Ecosystem.

== Awards and Honours ==
- Police Medal for Internal Security Service
- Police Medal for Gallantry
- President’s Police Medal for Meritorious Service
- President’s Police Medal for Distinguished Service
- Best Education Minister of the Year, 2025 (New Delhi) by the International Association of Educators for World Peace (affiliated to the United Nations)
