= Ratnesh Sada =

Indian politician

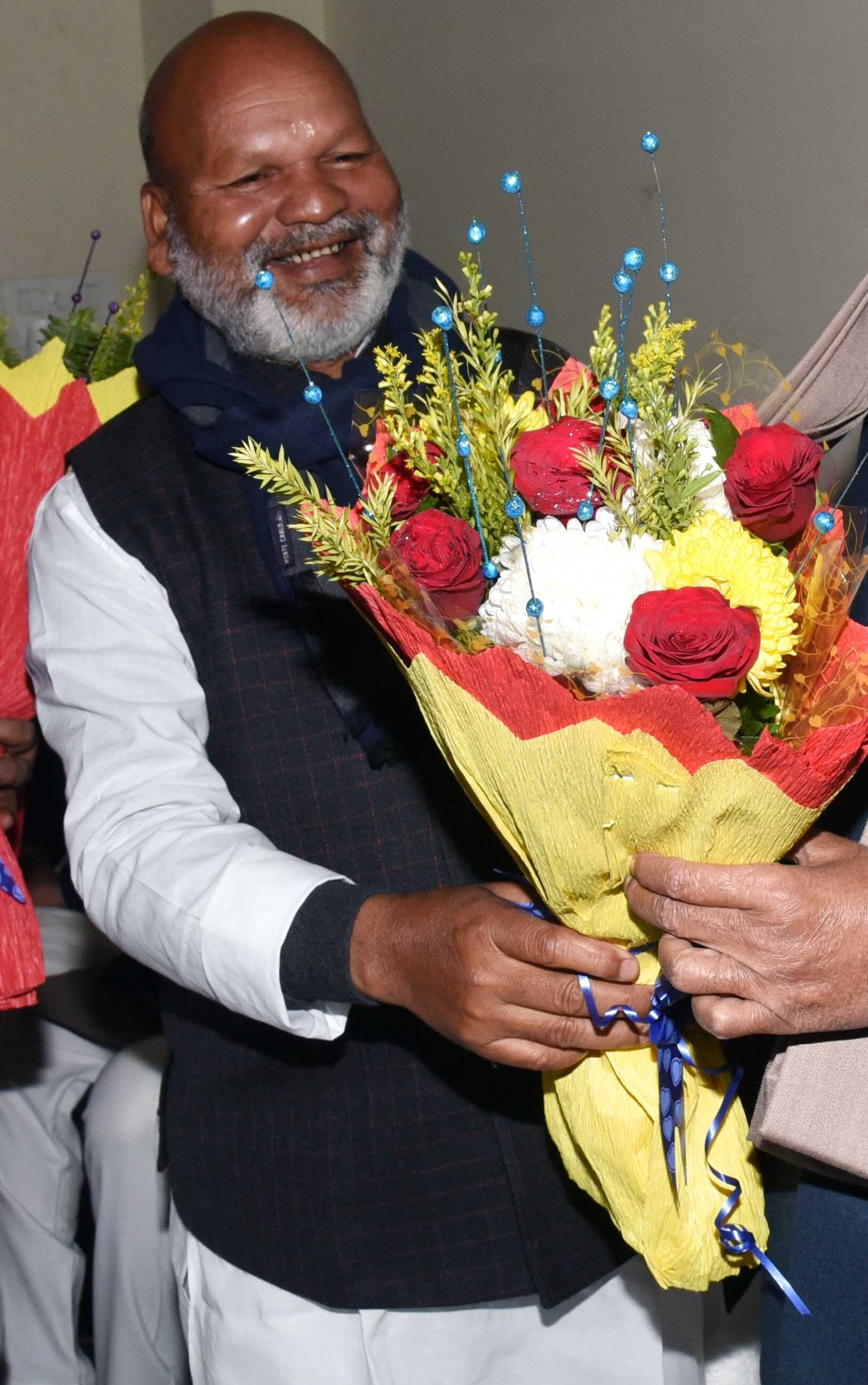

Minister of Disaster Management Government of Bihar
- Incumbent
- Assumed office 07 May 2026
- Governor: Syed Ata Hasnain
- Chief Minister: Samrat Choudhary
- Preceded by: Samrat Choudhary

Minister of Excise & Prohibition Government of Bihar
- In office 15 March 2024 – 20 November 2025
- Governor: Arif Mohammad Khan
- Chief Minister: Nitish Kumar
- Succeeded by: Bijendra Prasad Yadav

Member of the Bihar Legislative Assembly
- Incumbent
- Assumed office 24 November 2010
- Constituency: Sonbarsha

Personal details
- Party: JD(U)
- Occupation: Politician

Ratnesh Sada is an Indian politician from Bihar and a Member of the Bihar Legislative Assembly. Sada won the Sonbarsha Assembly constituency on JD(U) ticket in the 2020 Bihar Legislative Assembly election and 2025 Bihar Legislative Assembly election. He is currently serving as the Minister of Disaster Management of Bihar.

Sada started his political career in the year 1987. He was a Rickshaw-puller in early part of his life. He is a resident of Mahishi Police station area and his village is called Balia Simar. His father was a daily wage labourer. He studied till graduation and was the president of Mahadalit wing of Janata Dal United. In 2010, he was elected as a member of Bihar Legislative Assembly from Sonbarsa Assembly constituency of Saharsa district and repeatedly elected for two more times from this constituency. In 2023, after the resignation of Santosh Kumar Suman from the cabinet of Nitish Kumar, he was given the ministerial berth in the Government of Bihar.

Sada has held the ministry of liquor control in the Government of Bihar. As the minister, he proposed enforcement of Criminal Control Act on the liquor mafia in the state of Bihar. This was done after the frequently occurring deaths in the state due to consumption of toxic liquor.
