= Sonbarsha Assembly constituency =

Coordinates: 25°41′42″N 86°42′29″E

Sonbarsha
- Constituency No. 74 for the Bihar Legislative Assembly

Constituency details
- Country: India
- Region: East India
- State: Bihar
- District: Saharsa
- Established: 1951
- Total electors: 302,061

Member of Legislative Assembly
- 18th Bihar Legislative Assembly
- Incumbent Ratnesh Sada
- Party: JD(U)
- Alliance: NDA
- Elected year: 2025

Sonbarsha is an assembly constituency in Saharsa district in the Indian state of Bihar. It has been reserved for scheduled castes since 2010. Earlier, it was an open seat.

== Overview ==
As per Delimitation of Parliamentary and Assembly constituencies Order, 2008, No. 74 Sonbarsha Assembly constituency (SC) is composed of the following: Sonbarsha, Patarghat and Banma Itahri community development blocks.

Sonbarsha Assembly constituency is part of No. 13 Madhepura (Lok Sabha constituency) .

== Members of the Legislative Assembly ==
Year	Name	Party
1952	Jageshwar Hajra	Indian National Congress
1957	Singheshwar Rai	Independent politician
1962	Sitaram Mahto	Independent politician
1967	Raj Nandan Rai	Independent politician
1969	Raj Nandan Rai	Indian National Congress
1972	Sitaram Mahto	Samyukta Socialist Party
1977	Mahamud Alam	Indian National Congress
1980	Anwarul Haque	Indian National Congress
1985	Karpoori Thakur	Lokdal
1990	Ram Jiwan Prasad	Janata Dal
1995	Ram Jiwan Prasad	Janata Dal
2000	Ashok Kumar Singh	Rashtriya Janata Dal
2005	Kishor Kumar Alias Munna	Independent
2005	Kishor Kumar Alias Munna	Independent
2010	Ratnesh Sada	Janata Dal (United)
2015	Ratnesh Sada	Janata Dal (United)
2020	Ratnesh Sada	Janata Dal (United)
2025	Ratnesh Sada	Janata Dal (United)

== Election results ==
=== 2025 ===
2025 Bihar Legislative Assembly election: Sonbarsha
Party	Candidate	Votes	%	±%
JD(U)	Ratnesh Sada	97,833	47.39	+7.19
INC	Sarita Devi	84,379	40.87	+8.67
JSP	Satyendra Kumar	5,655	2.74	
BSP	Kiran Devi	5,019	2.43	+0.74
Independent	Rajesh Ram	4,038	1.96	−0.95
Independent	Parmod Sada	3,998	1.94	
NOTA	None of the above	5,522	2.67	+1.66
Majority		13,454	6.52	−1.48
Turnout		206,444	68.35	+14.62
JD(U) hold		Swing		

=== 2020 ===
2020 Bihar Legislative Assembly election: Sonbarsha
Party	Candidate	Votes	%	±%
JD(U)	Ratnesh Sada	67,678	40.2	−19.46
INC	Tarni Rishideo	54,212	32.2	
LJP	Sarita Devi	13,566	8.06	−15.47
Independent	Rajesh Ram	4,893	2.91	
JAP(L)	Manoj Paswan	4,790	2.85	−0.81
Independent	Sikandar Sada	3,750	2.23	
Independent	Ramesh Kumar Sharma	3,382	2.01	
BSP	Kiran Devi	2,848	1.69	+0.47
Independent	Manjay Kumar	2,775	1.65	
Independent	Bhumi Paswan	2,547	1.51	
NCP	Pawan Paswan	1,792	1.06	
NOTA	None of the above	1,701	1.01	−3.32
Majority		13,466	8.0	−28.13
Turnout		168,356	53.73	+1.15
JD(U) hold		Swing		

=== 2015 ===
2015 Bihar Legislative Assembly election: Sonbarsha
Party	Candidate	Votes	%	±%
JD(U)	Ratnesh Sada	88,789	59.66	
LJP	Sarita Devi	35,026	23.53	
JAP(L)	Manoj Paswan	5,443	3.66	
CPI	Rajkumar Chaudhary	4,830	3.25	
Independent	Prithvi Chand Sada	2,246	1.51	
Maanavvaadi Janta Party	Chandan Rishideo	2,238	1.5	
BMP	Satyanarayan Paswan	2,007	1.35	
BSP	Rajesh Ram	1,809	1.22	
NOTA	None of the above	6,449	4.33	
Majority		53,763	36.13	
Turnout		148,837	52.58	

=== 2010 ===
In the 2010 state assembly elections, Ratnesh Sada of JD(U) won the Sonbarsha assembly seat defeating Sarita Devi of LJP. Contests in most years were multi cornered but only winners and runners up are being mentioned. Kishor Kumar, Independent,defeated RJD in October 2005 and Ashok Kumar Singh of RJD in February 2005. Ashok Kumar Singh defeated Kishor Kumar Singh, Independent, in 2000. Ashok Kumar Singh of JD defeated Tej Narayan Yadav, Independent, in 1995, and K.K. Mandal of Congress in 1990. Surya Narayan Yadav of aLD defeated Tej Narayan Yadav of CPI in 1985. Surya Narayan Yadav of Congress (U) defeated K.K. Mandal of Congress in 1980. Ashok Kumar Singh of JP defeated Surya Narayan Yadav, Independent, in 1977.
