= Aurai, Bihar Assembly constituency =

Coordinates: 26°19′21″N 85°34′40″E

- Constituency No. - for the Bihar Legislative Assembly

Constituency details
- Country: India
- Region: East India
- State: Bihar
- District: Muzaffarpur
- Established: 1967
- Total electors: 311,664
- Reservation: None

Member of Legislative Assembly
- 18th Bihar Legislative Assembly
- Incumbent Rama Nishad
- Party: BJP
- Alliance: NDA
- Elected year: 2025

Aurai Assembly constituency is an assembly constituency in Muzaffarpur district in the Indian state of Bihar.

== Overview ==
As per Delimitation of Parliamentary and Assembly constituencies Order, 2008, No. 89 Aurai Assembly constituency is composed of the following: Aurai community development block; Belpakauna, Berai North, Changel, Hathauri, Jajuar (including East, West, and Middle panchayats), Katai, Khanguradih, Lakhanpur, Nagwara, Pahsaul, Bansghatta, Barri, Tehwara and Bandhapura gram panchayats of Katra CD Block.

Aurai Assembly constituency is part of No. 15 Muzaffarpur (Lok Sabha constituency).

== Members of Legislative Assembly ==
| Year | Name | Party |
|---|---|---|
| 1967 | C. M. P. Singh | Indian National Congress |
| 1969 | Pandav Rai | Samyukta Socialist Party |
| 1972 | Ram Babu Singh | Indian National Congress |
| 1977 | Ganesh Prasad Yadav | Janata Party |
| 1980 | Ganesh Prasad Yadav | Janata Party |
| 1985 | Ganesh Prasad Yadav | Janata Party |
| 1990 | Ganesh Prasad Yadav | Janata Dal |
| 1995 | Ganesh Prasad Yadav | Janata Dal |
| 2000 | Ganesh Prasad Yadav | Janata Dal (United) |
| 2005 | Arjun Roy | Janata Dal (United) |
| 2005 | Arjun Roy | Janata Dal (United) |
| 2009^ | Surendra Kumar Yadav | Rashtriya Janata Dal |
| 2010 | Ram Surat Rai | Bharatiya Janata Party |
| 2015 | Surendra Kumar Yadav | Rashtriya Janata Dal |
| 2020 | Ram Surat Rai | Bharatiya Janata Party |
| 2025 | Rama Nishad | Bharatiya Janata Party |

== Election results ==
=== 2025 ===
2025 Bihar Legislative Assembly election: Aurai
| Party | Candidate | Votes | % | ±% |
|---|---|---|---|---|
| BJP | Rama Nishad | 104,085 | 50.06 | ▼2.27 |
| VIP | Bhogendra Sahni | 46,879 | 22.55 | |
| ASP(KR) | Md. Aftab Alam | 31,430 | 15.12 | |
| Independent | Akhilesh Kumar | 8,915 | 4.29 | ▼1.57 |
| JSP | Radha Raman | 8,705 | 4.19 | |
| AAP | Sheo Shankar Gupta | 3,333 | 1.6 | |
| NOTA | None of the above | 3,443 | 1.66 | ▲0.37 |
| Majority | | 57,206 | 27.51 | ▼0.17 |
| Turnout | | 207,920 | 66.71 | ▲11.05 |
| BJP hold | | Swing | NDA | |

=== 2020 ===
2020 Bihar Legislative Assembly election: Aurai
| Party | Candidate | Votes | % | ±% |
|---|---|---|---|---|
| BJP | Ram Surat Rai | 90,479 | 52.33 | +15.91 |
| CPI(ML)L | Md. Aftab Alam | 42,613 | 24.65 | |
| Independent | Akhilesh Kumar | 10,132 | 5.86 | |
| Independent | Surendra Kumar | 8,351 | 4.83 | |
| Bhartiya Chetna Party | Bimal Devi | 3,557 | 2.06 | |
| Rashtriya Jan Jan Party | Dinbandhu Kumar | 2,718 | 1.57 | |
| Garib Janshakti Party | Ashok Kumar Jha | 2,286 | 1.32 | +0.05 |
| BSP | Dinesh Das | 2,191 | 1.27 | −0.09 |
| JD(S) | Anish Kumar | 1,909 | 1.1 | |
| Independent | Mohan Kumar | 1,859 | 1.08 | |
| NOTA | None of the above | 2,237 | 1.29 | −0.17 |
| Majority | | 47,866 | 27.68 | +20.66 |
| Turnout | | 172,891 | 55.66 | +0.26 |
| BJP gain from RJD | | Swing | | |

=== 2015 ===
2015 Bihar Legislative Assembly election: Aurai
| Party | Candidate | Votes | % | ±% |
|---|---|---|---|---|
| RJD | Surendra Kumar | 66,958 | 43.44 | |
| BJP | Ram Surat Ray | 56,133 | 36.42 | |
| Sarvajan Kalyan Loktantrik Party | Lalbabu Sahni | 8,747 | 5.67 | |
| Independent | Mohamd Saifee | 4,561 | 2.96 | |
| Independent | Saket Kumar Singh | 2,837 | 1.84 | |
| BSP | Ganesh Prasad Chauhan | 2,096 | 1.36 | |
| Garib Janshakti Party | Ashok Kumar Jha | 1,953 | 1.27 | |
| Independent | Gopal Prasad Shahi | 1,723 | 1.12 | |
| Independent | Nageshwar Prasad Singh | 1,513 | 0.98 | |
| NOTA | None of the above | 2,246 | 1.46 | |
| Majority | | 10,825 | 7.02 | |
| Turnout | | 154,133 | 55.4 | |
