= Dalsinghsarai Assembly constituency =

Coordinates: 25°39′47″N 85°50′30″E

Dalsinghsarai
- Former constituency for the Bihar Legislative Assembly

Constituency details
- Country: India
- Region: East India
- State: Bihar
- District: Samastipur
- Lok Sabha constituency: Samastipur
- Established: 1972
- Abolished: 2010

Dalsinghsarai Assembly constituency was an assembly constituency in Samastipur district in the Indian state of Bihar.

As a consequence of the orders of the Delimitation Commission of India, Dalsinghsarai Assembly constituency ceased to exist in 2010.

It was part of Samastipur Lok Sabha constituency.

== Results ==
=== 1967–2005 ===
In the October 2005 Bihar Assembly elections, Ram Lakhan Mahato of RJD won the Dalsinghsarai seat defeating his nearest rival Sheel Kumar Roy of LJP. Contests in most years were multi cornered but only winners and runners are being mentioned. Sheel Kumar Roy of LJP defeated Ram Lakhan Mahato of RJD in February 2005. Ram Padarnath Mahto of RJD defeated Vijay Kumar Chaudhary of Indian National Congress in 2000. Ram Lakhan Mahato of JD defeated Vijay Kumar Chaudhary of Congress in 1995. Vijay Kumar Chaudhary of Congress defeated Harbans Narain Singh of JD in 1990. Vijay Kumar Chaudhary of Congress defeated Ram Vilas Roy Vimal of CPI in 1985. Following the death of sitting legislator Jagdish Prasad Choudhary, Vijay Kumar Chaudhary of Indian National Congress defeated Ram Padarath Mahto of Janata Party in a by-election in 1982. Jagdish Prasad Choudhary of Congress (I) defeated Ram Padarnath Mahto of Janata Party (SC). Yashwant Kumar Choudhary of Janata Party defeated Jagdish Prasad Choudhary of Congress in 1977. Jagdish Prasad Choudhary of Indian National Congress defeated Yashwant Kumar Choudhary of Janata Party in 1972.In 1969, Shri Yashwant Kumar Choudhary won Dalsinghsarai for the Swatantra Party with 15,462 votes against Congress’s Shri Rameshwar Singh with 12,956 votes.

In 1967, Shri Yashwant Kumar Choudhary won Dalsinghsarai for the Swatantra Party. He received 16,292 votes against 7,398 for Congress’s Shri A.B. Nazari, a margin of 8,894. The 1967 result abbreviates the winner as “Y.K. Chaudhary”, and the constituency is wrongly referenced as "Balsinghsarai" instead of "Dalsinghsarai", which could have arisen since these details were manually digitised from hard-copy records. His identity is supported by the exact constituency and party, and the contemporaneous party record naming Shri Yashwant Kumar Choudhary as an MLA in July 1967.
