= Ram Padarnath Mahto =

Former minister in Government of Bihar

Bihar Legislative Assembly
- In office 2000–2005
- Preceded by: Ram Lakhan Mahato
- Constituency: Dalsinghsarai

Personal details
- Political party: Rashtriya Janata Dal

Ram Padarnath Mahto also known as Ram Padarath Mahto was an Indian politician, who served as Minister for Official Language in Government of Bihar. He was the brother of another politician and former Minister Ram Lakhan Mahato. Mahto was a leader of Rashtriya Janata Dal, on the symbol of which he contested 2000 Bihar Assembly elections from Dalsinghsarai Assembly constituency. He was an educationist in his early life, before joining active politics. Mahto formerly worked as principal of Sakara College. He started his political career with parties like Swatantra Party and also worked with Karpoori Thakur. Mahto died in April 2020 at the age of 91, in his ancestral village, Rampur Jalal.

== Biography ==
Mahto completed his matriculation from Chhatradhari School in 1946. He was eldest among his six brothers. Mahto later moved to Banaras Hindu University, from where he completed his master's degree and also completed his another degree of law. After completing his education in 1955, he joined active politics from 1957. He contested elections of 1962 as a candidate of Swatantra Party, and elections of 1977 and 1982 as a candidate of the political party of Karpoori Thakur. However, in these elections, he faced consecutive defeats. His first electoral victory came in 2000, when he contested the Assembly elections on the symbol of Rashtriya Janata Dal. After this victory, he was made Minister for Official Language in Government of Bihar. Besides politics, Mahto had also worked as educationist. He previously worked as professor in R.B College Dalsinghsarai, Amnour College Saran and Sakra College.
