= Ram Lakhan Mahato =

Indian politician (1947–2020)

Member of Bihar Legislative Assembly
- In office 2005–2010
- Preceded by: Sheel Kumar Roy
- Succeeded by: Constituency Dissolved
- Constituency: Dalsinghsarai
- In office 1995–2000
- Preceded by: Vijay Kumar Chaudhary
- Succeeded by: Ram Padarnath Mahto
- Constituency: Dalsinghsarai

Personal details
- Born: 27 July 1947
- Died: 31 January 2020 (aged 72)
- Party: Janata Dal (United)

Ram Lakhan Mahato (27 July 1947 – 31 January 2020) was an Indian politician from Bihar belonging to Janata Dal (United). He was a member of the Bihar Legislative Assembly. He was a minister of the Government of Bihar too.

== Biography ==
Mahato was elected as a member of the Bihar Legislative Assembly from Dalsinghsarai in 1995 as a Janata Dal candidate. He was appointed Food and Supplies Minister of the Government of Bihar in 1996.

Mahato was elected from Dalsinghsarai in October 2005 as a Rashtriya Janata Dal candidate. He joined Janata Dal (United) in 2010.

Mahato died on 31 January 2020 at the age of 72.
