= Lakhisarai Assembly constituency =

Assembly constituency in Bihar

- Constituency No. 168 for the Bihar Legislative Assembly

Constituency details
- Country: India
- Region: East India
- State: Bihar
- District: Lakhisarai
- Lok Sabha constituency: Munger
- Established: 1977
- Total electors: 391,944

Member of Legislative Assembly
- 18th Bihar Legislative Assembly
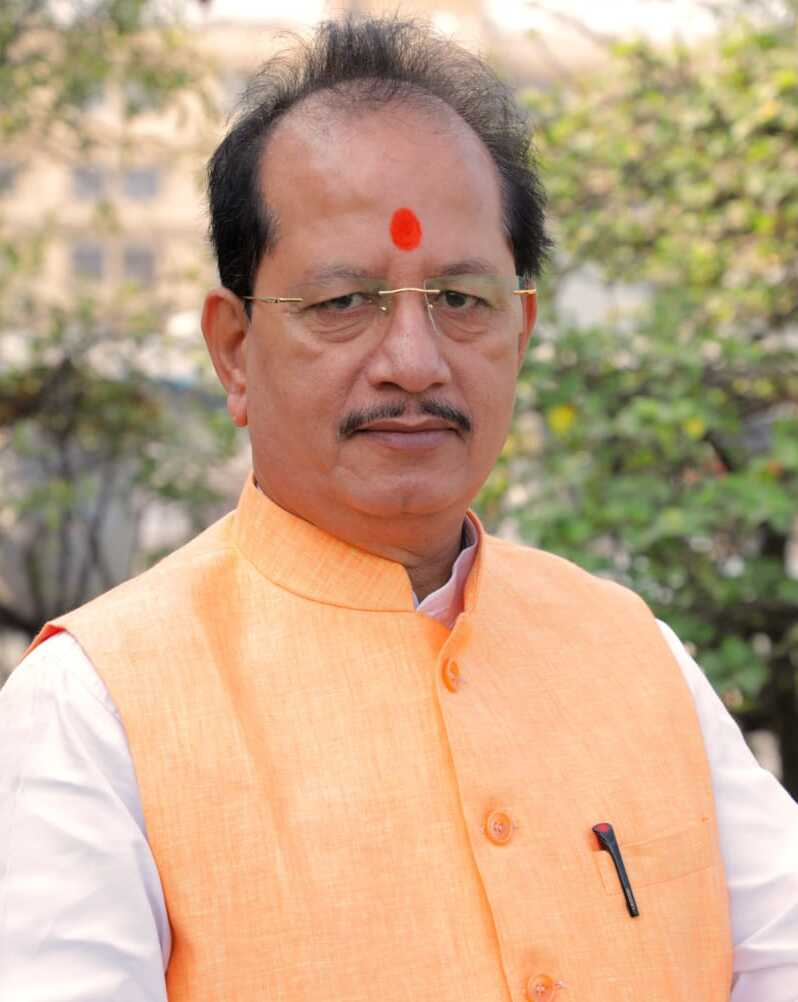
- Incumbent Vijay Kumar Sinha
- Party: BJP
- Alliance: NDA
- Elected year: 2025
- Preceded by: Phulena Singh, RJD

Lakhisarai Assembly constituency is one of 243 constituencies of legislative assembly of Bihar. It is part of Munger Lok Sabha constituency along with other assembly constituencies viz. Suryagarha, Munger and Jamalpur.

== Overview ==
Lakhisarai comprises Blocks Ramgarh Chowk, Halsi & Barahiya; Gram Panchayats Amahara, Morma, Balgudar, Savikpur, Kachhiyana, Bilauri, Damodarpur & Lakhisarai (M) of Lakhisarai CD Block.

== Members of the Legislative Assembly ==
| Year | Name | Party |
|---|---|---|
| 1977 | Kapildeo Singh | Janata Party |
| 1980 | Ashwani Kumar Sharma | Indian National Congress |
| 1985 | Krishnachandra Prasad Singh | Janata Party |
| 1990 | Krishnachandra Prasad Singh | Janata Dal |
| 1995 | Yaduvansh Singh | Janata Dal |
| 2000 | Krishnachandra Prasad Singh | Bharatiya Janata Party |
| 2005 | Vijay Kumar Sinha | Bharatiya Janata Party |
| 2005 | Fulena Singh | Rashtriya Janata Dal |
| 2010 | Vijay Kumar Sinha | Bharatiya Janata Party |
| 2015 | Vijay Kumar Sinha | Bharatiya Janata Party |
| 2020 | Vijay Kumar Sinha | Bharatiya Janata Party |
| 2025 | Vijay Kumar Sinha | Bharatiya Janata Party |

== Election results ==
=== 2025 ===
Bihar Assembly election, 2025: Lakhisarai
| Party | Candidate | Votes | % | ±% |
|---|---|---|---|---|
| BJP | Vijay Kumar Sinha | 122,408 | 49.2 | ▲11.0 |
| INC | Amresh Kumar | 97,468 | 39.17 | ▲6.37 |
| JSP | Suraj Kumar | 8,722 | 3.51 | |
| Independent | Vijay Kumar | 4,045 | 1.63 | |
| NOTA | None of the above | 5,731 | 2.3 | ▲1.24 |
| Majority | | 24,940 | 10.03 | ▲4.63 |
| Turnout | | 248,820 | 63.48 | ▲10.7 |
| BJP hold | | Swing | | |

=== 2020 ===
Bihar Assembly election, 2020: Lakhisarai
| Party | Candidate | Votes | % | ±% |
|---|---|---|---|---|
| BJP | Vijay Kumar Sinha | 74,212 | 38.2 | −2.59 |
| INC | Amresh Kumar | 63,729 | 32.8 | |
| Independent | Sujeet Kumar | 11,570 | 5.96 | |
| Independent | Fulena Singh | 10,938 | 5.63 | |
| Independent | Babita Kumari | 4,922 | 2.53 | |
| BSP | Rajiv Ranjan Kumar Rai | 4,085 | 2.1 | +1.0 |
| Independent | Sujit Kumar | 4,021 | 2.07 | |
| Independent | Vijay Prasad Singh | 3,859 | 1.99 | |
| JAP(L) | Vimal Kumar | 3,095 | 1.59 | |
| Independent | Rajendra Prasad Sahu | 2,426 | 1.25 | |
| Independent | Sudhir Kumar | 2,331 | 1.2 | |
| Aam Janta Party Rashtriya | Vijay Ram | 1,782 | 0.92 | −0.1 |
| NOTA | None of the above | 2,058 | 1.06 | −1.3 |
| Majority | | 10,483 | 5.4 | +1.88 |
| Turnout | | 194,289 | 52.78 | −1.49 |
| BJP hold | | Swing | | |

=== 2015 ===
Bihar Assembly election, 2015: Lakhisarai
| Party | Candidate | Votes | % | ±% |
|---|---|---|---|---|
| BJP | Vijay Kumar Sinha | 75,901 | 40.79 | |
| JD(U) | Ramanand Mandal | 69,345 | 37.27 | |
| SS | Ram Pukar Mandal | 11,551 | 6.21 | |
| Independent | Sujeet Kumar | 8,112 | 4.36 | |
| CPI(M) | Moti Saw | 4,536 | 2.44 | |
| SP | Ramashish Kumar | 3,034 | 1.63 | |
| Independent | Renu Devi | 2,689 | 1.45 | |
| BSP | Manoj Kumar | 2,052 | 1.1 | |
| Aam Janta Party Rashtriya | Ranjeet Ram | 1,906 | 1.02 | |
| NOTA | None of the above | 4,386 | 2.36 | |
| Majority | | 6,556 | 3.52 | |
| Turnout | | 186,060 | 54.27 | |
| BJP hold | | Swing | | |
