= Dilip Kumar Jaiswal =

Indian politician (born 1963)

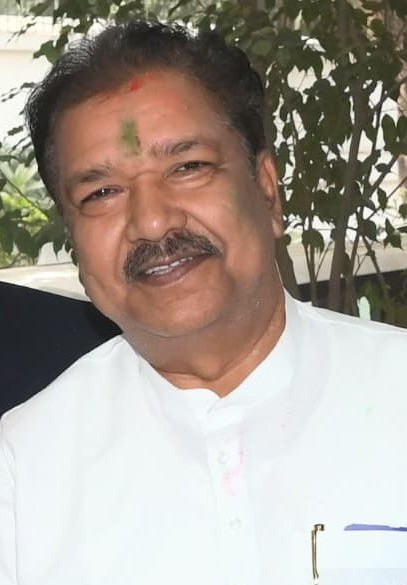

Minister of Revenue and Land Reforms of Bihar
- Incumbent
- Assumed office 7 May 2026
- Chief Minister: Samrat Choudhary
- Preceded by: Samrat Choudhary

Minister of Industries Government of Bihar
- In office 20 November 2025 – 15 April 2026
- Chief Minister: Nitish Kumar
- Preceded by: Nitish Mishra
- Succeeded by: Samrat Choudhary

President, Bharatiya Janata Party, Bihar
- In office 26 July 2024 – 15 December 2025
- Preceded by: Samrat Choudhary
- Succeeded by: Sanjay Saraogi

Minister of Revenue and Land Reforms Government of Bihar
- In office 15 March 2024 – 26 February 2025
- Chief Minister: Nitish Kumar
- Preceded by: Vijay Kumar Sinha
- Succeeded by: Sanjay Saraogi

Member of Bihar Legislative Council
- Incumbent
- Assumed office 8 April 2022
- Preceded by: himself
- Constituency: Purnia-Araria-Kishanganj Local Authorities
- In office 17 July 2009 – 16 July 2021
- Preceded by: Mohammed Azimuddin
- Succeeded by: himself
- Constituency: Purnia-Araria-Kishanganj Local Authorities

Minister of Road Construction Government of Bihar
- In office 16 December 2025 – 15 April 2025
- Chief Minister: Nitish Kumar
- Preceded by: Nitin Nabin
- Succeeded by: Samrat Choudhary

Personal details
- Born: 3 December 1963 (age 62) Gogri, Bihar, India
- Party: Bharatiya Janata Party
- Children: 2
- Education: M.Sc., MBA, Ph.D., M. Phil.

Dilip Kumar Jaiswal (born 3 December 1963) is an Indian politician belonging to the Bharatiya Janata Party. Jaiswal is currently serving as the Minister of Revenue and Land Reforms, Bihar and also the current deputy chief whip of ruling party in Bihar Legislative Council. He served as the State President of Bihar BJP between July 2024 and December 2025. He is a third time member of the Bihar Legislative Council and also contested the 2014 Lok Sabha election from Kishanganj.

Jaiswal is also State Incharge for Sikkim BJP and the managing director of Mata Gujri Memorial Medical College, Kishanganj – affiliated to Mata Gujri University. He also worked as Chairman Bihar state warehousing corporation from 2005 to 2008. He was also the state treasurer for Bihar BJP over more than 20 years.
