= Home Department (Bihar) =

Indian state government

- गृह विभाग

Agency overview
- Jurisdiction: State of Bihar
- Headquarters: Home Department, Old Secretariat, Patna, Bihar; 25.3619°N 85.659°E
- Annual budget: ₹7,297 crore (US$780 million) (2016–17)
- Minister responsible: Samrat Chaudhary, Chief Minister of Bihar and Home Minister
- Agency executive: Senthil K Kumar, IAS, Principal Secretary (Home)
- Website: Official Website

The Home Department (Hindi: गृह विभाग) is a department of Government of Bihar. It plays a key role in maintenance of administration in the state of Bihar. The department oversees the maintenance of law and order, prevention and control of crime, prosecution of criminals besides dealing with Fire Services and Prisons Administration. It is the nodal department for the State Secretariat Service and is also responsible for the functioning of State Police and Home Guards Services. The department is also the cadre controlling authority of Indian Police Service (IPS) (Bihar Cadre) and Bihar Police Service (BPS). The Chief Minister generally serves as the departmental minister, and the Principal Secretary (Home), an IAS officer, is the administrative head of the department.

== Functions ==
The Home Department is responsible for maintenance of internal security and enforcement of law and order in the state of Bihar. The department also oversees the functioning of State Police, Home Guards, Fire Services, Prisons & Correctional Services. The department answers the questions in the Legislative Assembly/Legislative Council, addresses the issues related to the affairs of the State Human Rights Commission, and National Human Rights Commission. The department also keeps a close liaison with Defense Services of Military and Civil Co-operation and for setting up of defense projects in the State. It also coordinates police and law and order related matters with the Ministry of Home Affairs, Government of India.

The department ensures the security arrangements of citizens, VIPs and state guests and also is the cadre controlling authority of Indian Police Service, and Bihar Police Service.

== Organizational structure ==
The Chief Minister of Bihar, Samrat Chaudhary, is the minister responsible for Department of Home.

The department is headed by the Principal Secretary rank IAS officer. The Principal Secretary is assisted by 2 Secretaries, 2 Special Secretaries, 2 Additional Secretaries, 3 Joint Secretaries and 1 Under Secretary. The department is broadly divided into 3 branches – Special Section, Police Section and Prison Section.

Important Officials-Home Department(Special Section)
| Name | Designation |
|---|---|
| Chaitanya Prasad | Principal Secretary |
| K Senthil Kumar | Secretary |
| Jitendra Srivastava | Secretary |
| Vikas Vaibhav | Special Secretary |
| Bimalesh Kumar Jha | Joint Secretary |
| Animesh Pandey | Joint Secretary |
| Anjani Kumar | Deputy Secretary |

Important Officials-Home Department(Prison Section)
| Name | Designation |
|---|---|
| Mithilesh Mishra | I.G. Prisons & Correctional Services |
| Rajnish Kumar Singh | Joint Secretary-cum-Director (Administration) Prisons & Correctional Services |
| Anjani Kumar | Deputy Secretary-cum-Deputy Director (Administration) |

Important Officials-Home Department(Police Section)
| Name | Designation |
|---|---|
| K Senthil Kumar | Secretary |
| Girish Mohan Thakur | Under Secretary |

== List ==
| # | Portrait | Name | Term | | | Chief Minister | Party |
|---|---|---|---|---|---|---|---|
| | | Nitish Kumar | 24 November 2005 | 20 May 2014 | 8 years, 177 days | Himself | Janata Dal (United) |
| | | Jitan Ram Manjhi | 20 May 2014 | 22 February 2015 | 278 days | Himself | Janata Dal (United) |
| | | Nitish Kumar | 22 February 2015 | 20 November 2025 | 10 years, 271 days | Himself | Janata Dal (United) |
| | | Samrat Choudhary | 20 November 2025 | Incumbent | 1 year, 2 days | Nitish Kumar(until 14 April 2026); Himself (from 15 April 2026) | Bharatiya Janata Party |

== See also ==
- List of ministers of finance of Bihar
- Ministry of Road Construction Department (Bihar)
