= Santosh Kumar Suman =

Indian politician (born 1975)

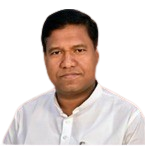

Cabinet Minister, Government of Bihar
- Incumbent
- Assumed office 07 May 2026
- Chief Minister: Samrat Choudhary
- Ministry and Departments: Minor water resources
- Preceded by: Samrat Choudhary
- In office 28 January 2024 – 15 April 2026
- Chief Minister: Nitish Kumar
- Ministry and Departments1: Minor water resources
- Succeeded by: Samrat Choudhary
- In office 16 November 2020 – 9 August 2022
- Chief Minister: Nitish Kumar
- Ministry and Departments: Minor Irrigation; SC & ST Welfare; Information Technology; Disaster Management
- Preceded by: Narendra Narayan Yadav; Ratnesh Sada; Vijay Kumar Mandal; Krishna Kumar Mantoo

Member of the Bihar Legislative Council
- Incumbent
- Assumed office 7 May 2018
- Preceded by: Jitan Ram Manjhi

President, Hindustani Awam Morcha
- Incumbent
- Assumed office 26 April 2022

Personal details
- Born: 10 February 1975 (age 51) Mahakar, Gaya, Bihar, India
- Citizenship: Indian
- Party: Hindustani Awam Morcha (Secular)
- Children: 2
- Parents: Jitan Ram Manjhi (Father); Shanti Devi (Mother)

Santosh Kumar Suman (born 10 February 1975) is an Indian politician from Bihar. He is a member of the Bihar Legislative Council representing the Hindustani Awam Morcha, and was elected unopposed in the elections in March 2023. He is the son of former Bihar chief minister Jitan Ram Manjhi.He is currently serving as the Minister of Miner Water Irrigation of Bihar.

Santosh served as the minister of information technology, disaster management, and minor water resources in the Ninth Nitish Kumar ministry from 28 January 2024 to 20 November 2025, the minister of SC/ST welfare in the Eighth Nitish Kumar ministry from 16 August 2022 to 13 June 2023, and the minister of minor irrigation and SC/ST welfare in the Seventh Nitish Kumar ministry from 16 November 2020 to 9 August 2022.
