= Rama Nishad =

Indian politician

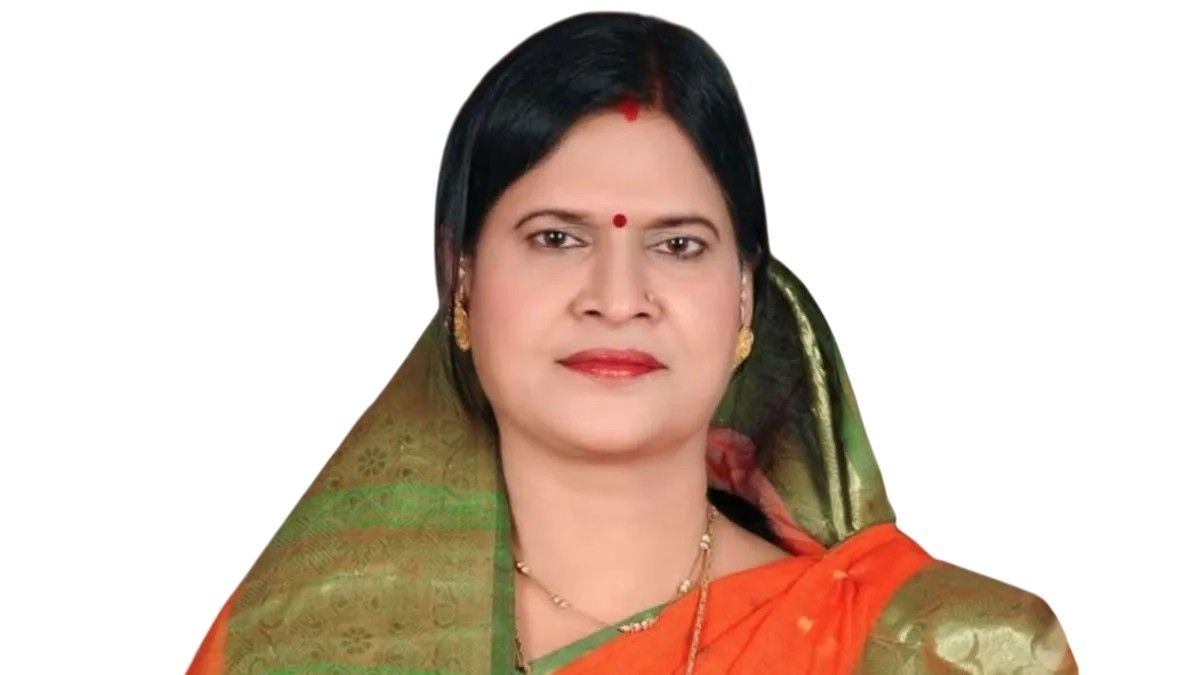

Minister of BC & EBC welfare Government of Bihar
- Incumbent
- Assumed office 07 May 2026
- Chief Minister: Samrat Choudhary
- Preceded by: Samrat Choudhary
- In office 20 November 2025 – 15 April 2026
- Chief Minister: Nitish Kumar
- Preceded by: Hari Sahni
- Succeeded by: Samrat Choudhary

Member of the Bihar Legislative Assembly
- Incumbent
- Assumed office 14 November 2025
- Preceded by: Ram Surat Kumar
- Constituency: Aurai

Personal details
- Party: Bharatiya Janata Party
- Profession: Politician

Rama Nishad is an Indian politician from Bihar. She is elected as a Member of Legislative Assembly in 2025 Bihar Legislative Assembly election from Aurai constituency. She is a member of the Bharatiya Janata Party. She is currently serving as BC & EBC Welfare Minister in the Government of Bihar. She is wife of former member of Parliament Ajay Nishad.
