= List of deputy chief ministers of Bihar =

De facto deputy head of state government

Deputy Chief Minister of Bihar
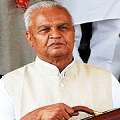
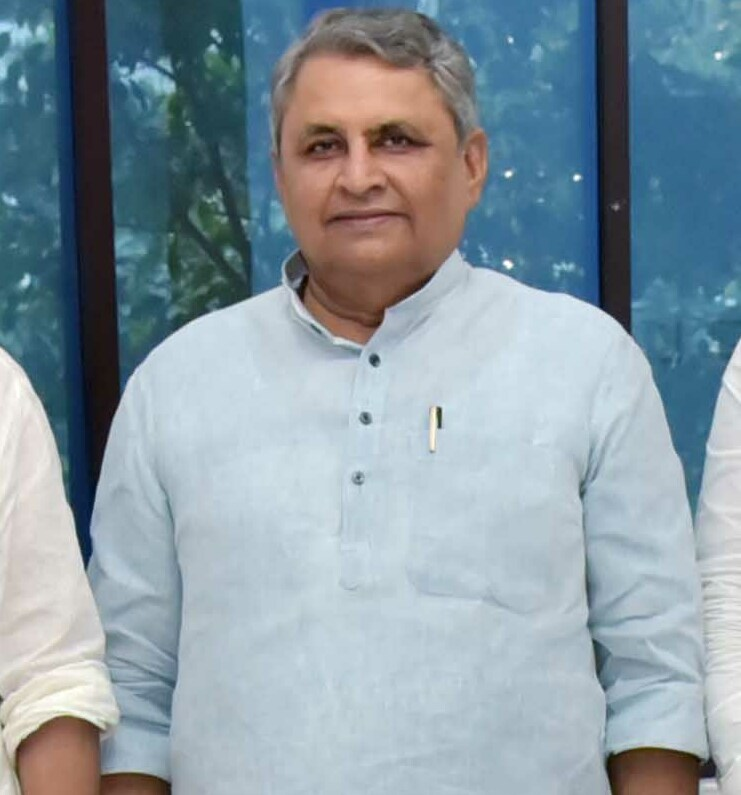
- Incumbent; Bijendra Prasad Yadav (since 15 April 2026) and Vijay Kumar Chaudhary (since 15 April 2026)
- Deputy Chief Ministers of Bihar
- Style: The Honourable (Formal); Mr. Deputy Chief Minister (Informal)
- Abbreviation: DCM
- Member of: Cabinet; Bihar Legislature
- Reports to: Chief Minister of Bihar; Bihar Legislature
- Residence: 208, Kautilya Nagar, MP MLA Colony, Patna
- Nominator: Chief Minister of Bihar
- Appointer: Governor of Bihar on the advice of the Chief Minister of Bihar
- Term length: At the confidence of the assembly Deputy Chief minister's term is for 5 years and is subject to no term limits.
- Inaugural holder: Anugrah Narayan Sinha
- Formation: 2 April 1946; 80 years ago
- Website: official website

The Deputy Chief Minister of Bihar is the second highest-ranking member of the state's council of ministers. The current deputy chief ministers of Bihar are Bijendra Prasad Yadav and Vijay Kumar Chaudhary serving in office since 15 April 2026. The position of deputy chief minister is not explicitly defined or mentioned in the Constitution of India. However, the Supreme Court of India has stated that the appointment of deputy chief ministers is not unconstitutional. The court has clarified that a deputy chief minister, for all practical purposes, remains a minister in the council of ministers headed by the chief minister and does not draw a higher salary or perks compared to other ministers.During the absence of the chief minister, the deputy-chief minister may chair cabinet meetings and lead the assembly majority. Various deputy chief ministers have also taken the oath of secrecy in line with the one that chief minister takes. This oath has also sparked controversies.

== List ==
=== Deputy premiers of Bihar ===
Keys:

Indian National Congress
Bharatiya Janata Party
Rashtriya Janata Dal
Socialist Party
Janata Dal (United)

#	Portrait	Name	Term of office			Premier	Party
1		Anugrah Narayan Sinha	20 July 1937	31 October 1939	2 years, 103 days	Shri Krishna Sinha	Indian National Congress

=== Deputy Chief Ministers of Bihar ===
#	Portrait	Name	Constituency	Term of office			Chief Minister	Assembly (Election)	Party
1		Anugrah Narayan Sinha		2 April 1946	5 July 1957	11 years, 94 days	Shri Krishna Sinha	1st (1952)	Indian National Congress
1		Anugrah Narayan Sinha		2 April 1946	5 July 1957	11 years, 94 days	Shri Krishna Sinha	2nd (1957)	Indian National Congress
Vacant (5 July 1957 – 5 March 1967)
2		Karpoori Thakur	Tajpur	5 March 1967	28 January 1968	329 days	Mahamaya Prasad Sinha	4th (1967)	Socialist Party
3		Jagdeo Prasad	Kurtha	28 January 1968	1 February 1968	4 days	Satish Prasad Singh	4th (1967)	Shoshit Samaj Dal
Vacant (1 February 1968 – 3 June 1971)
4		Ram Jaipal Singh Yadav	Sonpur	3 June 1971	9 January 1972	220 days	Bhola Paswan Shastri	5th (1969)	Indian National Congress
Vacant (9 January 1972 – 24 November 2005)
5		Sushil Kumar Modi	MLC	24 November 2005	16 June 2013	7 years, 204 days	Nitish Kumar	14th (2005)	Bharatiya Janata Party
5		Sushil Kumar Modi	MLC	24 November 2005	16 June 2013	7 years, 204 days	Nitish Kumar	15th (2010)	Bharatiya Janata Party
Vacant (16 June 2013 – 20 November 2015)							Nitish Kumar		
6		Tejashwi Yadav	Raghopur	20 November 2015	26 July 2017	1 year, 248 days	Nitish Kumar	16th (2015)	Rashtriya Janata Dal
(5)		Sushil Kumar Modi	MLC	27 July 2017	16 November 2020	3 years, 112 days	Nitish Kumar	16th (2015)	Bharatiya Janata Party
7		Tarkishore Prasad	Katihar	16 November 2020	9 August 2022	1 year, 266 days	Nitish Kumar	17th (2020)	Bharatiya Janata Party
7		Renu Devi	Bettiah	16 November 2020	9 August 2022	1 year, 266 days	Nitish Kumar	17th (2020)	Bharatiya Janata Party
(6)		Tejashwi Yadav	Raghopur	10 August 2022	28 January 2024	1 year, 171 days	Nitish Kumar	17th (2020)	Rashtriya Janata Dal
8		Samrat Choudhary	MLC	28 January 2024	15 April 2026	2 years, 76 days	Nitish Kumar	17th (2020)	Bharatiya Janata Party
8		Samrat Choudhary	Tarapur	28 January 2024	15 April 2026	2 years, 76 days	Nitish Kumar	18th (2025)	Bharatiya Janata Party
8		Vijay Sinha	Lakhisarai	28 January 2024	15 April 2026	2 years, 76 days		18th (2025)	Bharatiya Janata Party
9		Bijendra Prasad Yadav	Supaul	15 April 2026	Incumbent	145 days	Samrat Choudhary	18th (2025)	Janata Dal (United)
9		Vijay Kumar Chaudhary	Sarairanjan	15 April 2026	Incumbent	145 days	Samrat Choudhary	18th (2025)	Janata Dal (United)

== Statistics ==
=== List by deputy chief minister ===
#	Deputy CM	Party	Term of office	
#	Deputy CM	Party	Longest term	Total duration
1	Anugrah Narayan Sinha	INC	11 years, 94 days	11 years, 94 days
2	Sushil Kumar Modi	BJP	7 years, 204 days	10 years, 316 days
3	Tejashwi Yadav	RJD	1 year, 248 days	3 years, 54 days
4	Samrat Choudhary	BJP	2 years, 77 days	2 years, 77 days
5	Vijay Kumar Sinha	BJP	2 years, 77 days	2 years, 77 days
6	Tarkishore Prasad	BJP	1 year, 266 days	1 year, 266 days
7	Renu Devi	BJP	1 year, 266 days	1 year, 266 days
8	Karpoori Thakur	SOC	329 days	329 days
9	Ram Jaipal Singh Yadav	INC	220 days	220 days
10	Bijendra Prasad Yadav*	JD(U)	145 days	145 days
11	Vijay Kumar Chaudhary*	JD(U)	145 days	145 days
12	Jagdeo Prasad	SSD	4 days	4 days

== Oath as the state deputy chief minister ==
The deputy chief minister serves five years in the office. The following is the oath of the Deputy chief minister of state:

I, <Name of Deputy Chief Minister>, do swear in the name of God/solemnly affirm that I will bear true faith and allegiance to the Constitution of India as by law established, that I will uphold the sovereignty and integrity of India, that I will faithfully and conscientiously discharge my duties as a Minister for the State of () and that I will do right to all manner of people in accordance with the Constitution and the law without fear or favour, affection or ill-will.

Oath of Secrecy

"I, [Name], do swear in the name of God / solemnly affirm that I will not directly or indirectly communicate or reveal to any person or persons any matter which shall be brought under my consideration or shall become known to me as a Minister for the State of [Name of State] except as may be required for the due discharge of my duties as such Minister."Pad ki Shapath (Oath of Office)

== See also ==
- Bihar
- Bihar Legislative Assembly
