= Leshi Singh =

Indian politician

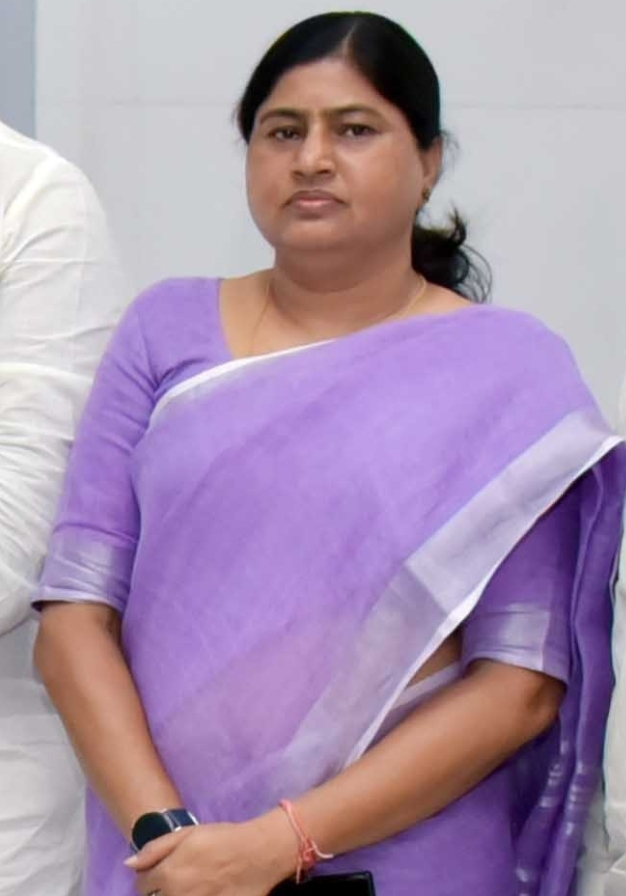

Minister of Building Construction Department Government of Bihar
- Incumbent
- Assumed office 07 May 2026
- Chief Minister: Samrat Choudhary
- Preceded by: Samrat Choudhary

Minister of Food & Consumer Protection Government of Bihar
- In office 15 March 2024 – 15 April 2026
- Chief Minister: Nitish Kumar
- Preceded by: Nitish Kumar
- Succeeded by: Bijendra Prasad Yadav
- In office 16 August 2022 – 28 January 2024
- Preceded by: Nitish Kumar
- Succeeded by: Nitish Kumar
- In office 9 February 2021 – 9 August 2022
- Preceded by: Bijendra Prasad Yadav
- Succeeded by: Nitish Kumar

Member of Bihar Legislative Assembly
- Incumbent
- Assumed office 2010
- Preceded by: Dilip Kumar Yadav
- Constituency: Dhamdaha
- In office 2000–2005
- Preceded by: Dilip Kumar Yadav
- Succeeded by: Dilip Kumar Yadav

Personal details
- Born: 5 January 1974 (age 52) Sarsi, Purnia, Bihar
- Party: Janata Dal (United) (Since 2003)
- Other political affiliations: Samata Party (1995-2003)
- Profession: Social Worker, Politician

Leshi Singh is an Indian Politician from JDU and senior member of the Bihar Legislative Assembly from the Dhamdaha in Bihar. She is currently serving as the Minister of Building Construction in the Government of Bihar and has also served as Food and Consumer Minister of Bihar previously.

== Political career ==
She is a Minister of Food and Consumer Protection of Bihar. Previously, Leshi was the Chairman of Bihar State Women Commission. In the 2000, 2005 (Feb.), 2010, 2015, 2020, and 2025 Bihar Assembly Elections, Leshi Singh won the Dhamdaha constituency of Bihar to become a Member of Legislative Assembly. She is the 6th term MLA from Dhamdaha (Purnia), winning by huge margin of approx. 55k votes.

She was the Food and Consumer Protection Minister in Government of Bihar in the Nitish Cabinet from 2021 to 2026 . Leshi is considered one of the most senior leaders of the Janata Dal (United).

== Personal life ==
She is the wife of Late Butan Singh, former district chief of Samata party and fiercely revered Vanguard . She belongs to prominent Rajput familys of Sarsi , Purnia .
