= Bijendra Prasad Yadav =

Indian politician (born 1946)

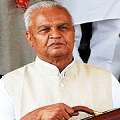
- Yadav in 2023

Deputy Chief Minister of Bihar
- Incumbent
- Assumed office 15 April 2026 Serving with Vijay Kumar Chaudhary
- Governor: Syed Ata Hasnain
- Chief Minister: Samrat Choudhary
- Ministry or Department: Finance; Commercial Taxes
- Preceded by: Samrat Choudhary and Vijay Kumar Sinha

Minister of Finance of Bihar
- Incumbent
- Assumed office 20 November 2025
- Chief Minister: Samrat Choudhary
- Preceded by: Samrat Choudhary
- In office 20 May 2014 – 20 November 2015
- Succeeded by: Abdul Bari Siddiqui

Minister of Commercial Taxes of Bihar
- Incumbent
- Assumed office 20 November 2025
- Chief Minister: Samrat Choudhary
- Preceded by: Samrat Choudhary
- In office 20 May 2014 – 20 November 2015

Minister of Prohibition, Excise and Registration of Bihar
- In office 2015–2015
- Preceded by: Jitan Ram Manjhi
- Succeeded by: Sunil Kumar
- In office 2010–2014
- Preceded by: Ramashray Prasad Singh
- Succeeded by: Jitan Ram Manjhi

Minister of Energy of Bihar
- In office 16 November 2020 – 07 May 2026
- Preceded by: Maheshwar Hazari
- Succeeded by: Shailesh Kumar Mandal
- In office 20 May 2014 – 22 February 2015
- In office 26 November 2010 – 20 May 2014
- Preceded by: Ramashray Prasad Singh
- Succeeded by: Jitan Ram Manjhi
- In office 24 November 2005 – 13 April 2008
- Preceded by: Shakeel Ahmed Khan
- Succeeded by: Ramashray Prasad Singh

Minister of Planning and Development of Bihar
- In office 16 November 2020 – 07 May 2026
- Preceded by: Maheshwar Hazari
- Succeeded by: Bhagwan Singh Kushwaha

Member of Bihar Legislative Assembly
- Incumbent
- Assumed office 1990
- Preceded by: Pramod Kumar Singh
- Constituency: Supaul

Minister of Food & Consumer Protection of Bihar
- In office 16 November 2020 – 9 February 2021
- Preceded by: Madan Sahni
- Succeeded by: Leshi Singh

Minister of Transport of Bihar
- In office 20 May 2014 – 22 February 2015
- Succeeded by: Dulal Chandra Goswami

Minister of Building Construction of Bihar
- In office 20 May 2014 – 22 February 2015

Minister of Environment, Forest and Climate Change of Bihar
- In office 20 May 2014 – 22 February 2015

Personal details
- Born: 10 October 1946 (age 80) Bihar, India
- Party: Janata Dal (United)
- Occupation: Politician

Bijendra Prasad Yadav (born 10 October 1946) is an Indian politician belonging to the Janata Dal (United), who is currently serving as the Deputy Chief Minister of Bihar. A member of the Bihar Legislative Assembly, he also serves as the Cabinet Minister for Finance, Commercial Taxes under Chief Minister Nitish Kumar and Samrat Choudhary. He has been an incumbent representative for Supaul since 1990.
