= Jitan Ram Manjhi =

Indian politician (born 1944)

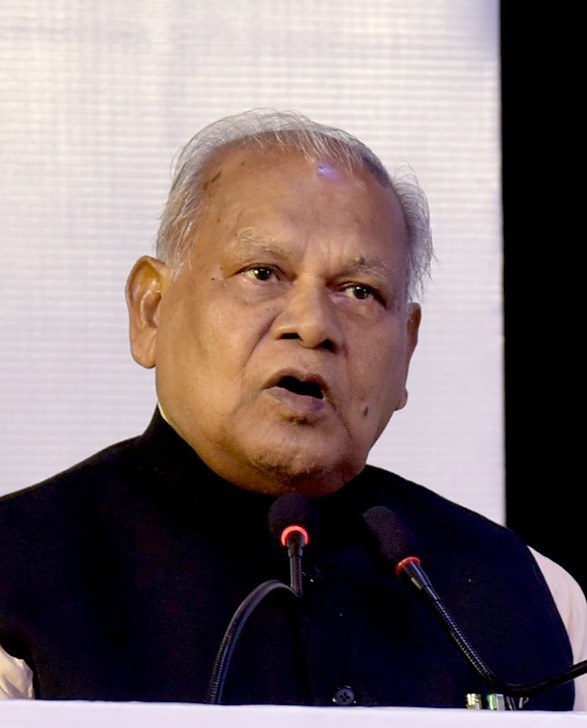
- Manjhi in June 2024

Union Minister of Micro, Small and Medium Enterprises
- Incumbent
- Assumed office 9 June 2024
- President: Droupadi Murmu
- Prime Minister: Narendra Modi
- Preceded by: Narayan Rane

Member of Parliament, Lok Sabha
- Incumbent
- Assumed office 4 June 2024
- Preceded by: Vijay Manjhi
- Constituency: Gaya, Bihar

Pro-tem Speaker of the Bihar Legislative Assembly
- In office 19 November 2020 – 24 November 2020

23rd Chief Minister of Bihar
- In office 20 May 2014 – 22 February 2015
- Governor: Keshari Nath Tripathi
- Preceded by: Nitish Kumar
- Succeeded by: Nitish Kumar

President of Hindustani Awam Morcha (Secular)
- In office 25 July 2015 – 26 April 2022
- Preceded by: Office established
- Succeeded by: Santosh Kumar Suman

Personal details
- Born: 6 October 1944 (age 82) Mahakar, Bihar, British India
- Party: HAM(S) (since 2015)
- Other political affiliations: JD(U) (2005—2015); RJD (1996—2004); JD (1990—1996); INC (1980—1990)
- Spouse: Shanti Devi (m. 1956)
- Children: 7; including Santosh Kumar Suman
- Education: Gaya College
- Profession: Politician

Jitan Ram Manjhi (born 6 October 1944) is an Indian politician who is serving as the 15th Minister of Micro, Small and Medium Enterprises since 2024. He is currently a Member of Parliament from Gaya constituency and was Bihar's 23rd Chief Minister from 20 May 2014 to 20 February 2015. He was the founding President of Hindustani Awam Morcha (HAM). Previously, he had served as minister for scheduled castes and scheduled tribes welfare in Nitish Kumar's cabinet. He has been a minister in several Bihar state governments, under multiple chief ministers like Chandrashekhar Singh, Bindeshwari Dubey, Satyendra Narayan Sinha, Jagannath Mishra, Lalu Prasad Yadav and Rabri Devi.

Manjhi has been a member of the Bihar Legislative Assembly since 1980. He was affiliated with several political parties, Indian National Congress (1980–1990), Janata Dal (1990–1996), Rashtriya Janata Dal (1996–2005) and JD(U) (2005–2015). He was expelled from JD(U) following the February 2015 political crisis and subsequently Jitan Ram Manjhi emerged as a major Dalit face in Bihar. In May 2015, he announced the new political party, Hindustani Awam Morcha. In July 2015, Jitan Ram Manjhi was accorded "Z"-plus security cover by the Union Home Ministry.

Currently, he is the oldest minister in the third term of NDA government after the winning of 2024 Lok Sabha election.

== Early life ==
Manjhi was born on 6 October 1944 in Mahakar village under Khijarsarai area in Gaya district of Bihar. His father Ramjit Ram Manjhi and mother Sukri Devi were farm labourers belonging to the Musahar community. He was tutored by an upper caste teacher after getting the permission of his upper-caste landlord until 7th class. After completing his graduation from Magadh University, he worked at the Gaya telephone exchange for 13 years until his younger brother became a policeman. He is married to Shanti Devi; the couple has two sons and five daughters. One of his sons, Santosh Suman Manjhi, is an MLC.

== Political career ==
=== Indian National Congress ===
Jitan Ram Manjhi entered politics in 1980. On the ticket of the Indian National Congress party, he contested and won the assembly elections from the Fatehpur segment in Gaya district. He became a minister for the first time in the Chandrashekhar Singh-led government in Bihar. He won from the same constituency in the 1985 election, but lost in 1990. Between 1980 and 1990, he served as a minister of state in successive cabinets headed by Congress chief ministers Bindeshwari Dubey, Satyendra Narayan Sinha and Jagannath Mishra.

=== Rashtriya Janata Dal ===
Immediately after losing the 1990 election, Manjhi switched to the Janata Dal. But when the Janata Dal split in 1996 and Laloo Prasad Yadav formed his own Rashtriya Janata Dal, Manjhi moved to the RJD under Yadav and won the Barachatti seat in the 1996 by-election (the previous incumbent Bhagwati Devi had left this seat to become a Member of Parliament from Gaya constituency). In the following election in 2000, he again won the same seat on an RJD ticket.

From 1996 to 2005, Manjhi was a minister in the RJD state government in Bihar, first under the chief ministership of Yadav himself, and then under Rabri Devi, Yadav's wife who took the chair of CM after Yadav himself was convicted and jailed for the Fodder Scam.

=== Janata Dal (United) ===
When Yadav's RJD lost the October 2005 elections to the Bharatiya Janata Party-Janata Dal (United) NDA coalition, Manjhi switched loyalties to the JDU. He won the election from Barachatti putting behind Samta Deva of his previous party RJD.

However, Manjhi was asked to resign immediately on the next day when his involvement in a corruption scam surfaced. Manjhi was involved in a fake B.Ed. degree racket in Bihar as the state education minister in the RJD government during the 1990s. As a junior minister in the Rabri Devi government, he was alleged to have given illegal permissions to institutes to run fake degree courses. He was later re-inducted in the state government cabinet by Chief Minister Nitish Kumar in 2008 after having absolved of the charges.

During the 2008 food crisis in Bihar, Manjhi promoted eating rats as they caused damage to food grains and as rats and chickens had "equal food values, not only in terms of protein, but in all areas of nutrition". Rat catching is common with people of the Musahar community to which Manjhi belongs.

In the 2010 Bihar elections, he was elected to state legislative assembly from Makhdumpur in Jehanabad district. After Kumar split his party Janata Dal (United) from the NDA to oppose coalition leader Bharatiya Janata Party's prime ministerial candidate Narendra Modi, Manjhi contested from Gaya but lost heavily and came a poor third behind winner Hari Manjhi (BJP) and Ramji Manjhi (RJD).

== As Chief Minister ==
Manjhi was once considered as a close confidant of former Bihar's CM and JDU supremo Nitish Kumar, but is not known for his administrative skills. Following the JDU's poor showing in the 2014 general election, Kumar accepted responsibility for the defeat and resigned. Manjhi, minister for SC and ST welfare in Nitish's cabinet, replaced him as the 23rd Chief Minister of Bihar. Manjhi's promotion, despite his loss in the general elections to the Lok Sabha and a miserable third-place finish in Gaya, has been criticized in the media for being a cynical political ploy of Kumar deliberately choosing a puppet whom he could control as well as to rouse casteist emotions. Opposition leader Sushil Kumar Modi of the Bharatiya Janata Party called Manjhi a "dummy chief minister", to which Manjhi responded by saying he was "not a rubber stamp." But after taking oath on 20 May 2014, Manjhi stated that he would "continue to seek guidance from Nitish Kumar." Due to the breakup of the JDU from the BJP-led NDA and the desertion of some JDU MLAs, CM Manjhi's government faced instability and appeared unlikely to pass the trust vote in the state legislative assembly. However, Lalu Prasad Yadav's RJD and Sonia Gandhi's Congress party provided outside support to Manjhi because he belongs to a backward caste.

After ten months, the party asked him to resign to make way for Nitish Kumar to return as the Chief Minister. He refused and was expelled from the party for refusing on 9 February 2015, resulting in a political crisis in the state. The governor asked Manjhi to seek a vote of confidence on 20 February 2015, the first day of budget session of assembly. BJP announced it would support Manjhi but Manjhi was short of numbers he needed to prove the majority. On 20 February 2015, Manjhi resigned from the post of Chief Minister in morning before vote. He told that the legislators who supported him were threatened with death and the speaker of assembly did not allow a secret ballot so he chose to resign. He said that the people of the state are watching these politicians and will show them the power of democracy.

In 2015, after resigning from the post of Chief Minister, Manjhi split and set up his own party, the Hindustan Awam Morcha-Secular(HAM-S) and joined BJP led NDA.

== As Minister ==
Former Bihar CM Jitan Ram Manjhi, reached Parliament for Modi cabinet Oath Ceremony. He took the oath of ministerial office and secrecy. He won the elections from Gaya constituency in Lok Sabha Election 2024.

== Controversies ==
During a speech in a meeting of Bihar State Foodgrain Businessmen's Association, Manjhi commented that his government is ready to forgive allegations against small-scale traders that indulge in black marketing and hoarding of food grains. He defended their action by adding that small-scale hoarding by these traders as a means to provide sustenance to their families and education to their children, both of which, in his view, were "noble causes." Widely criticised by the Indian media as "shocking," the comment came at a time when soaring prices of essential commodities were exacerbating India's food inflation, which the credit rating agency Moody's attributed to "structural problems that have widened the gap between demand and supply of food".

In 2021, he faced controversy for giving controversial remarks insinuating that Brahmins were foreigners.

== See also ==
- List of politicians from Bihar
- Third Modi ministry

Political offices
Preceded by Nitish Kumar	Chief Minister of Bihar; 20 May 2014 – 20 February 2015	Succeeded by Nitish Kumar
