= Vijay Kumar Sinha =

Indian politician (born 1967)

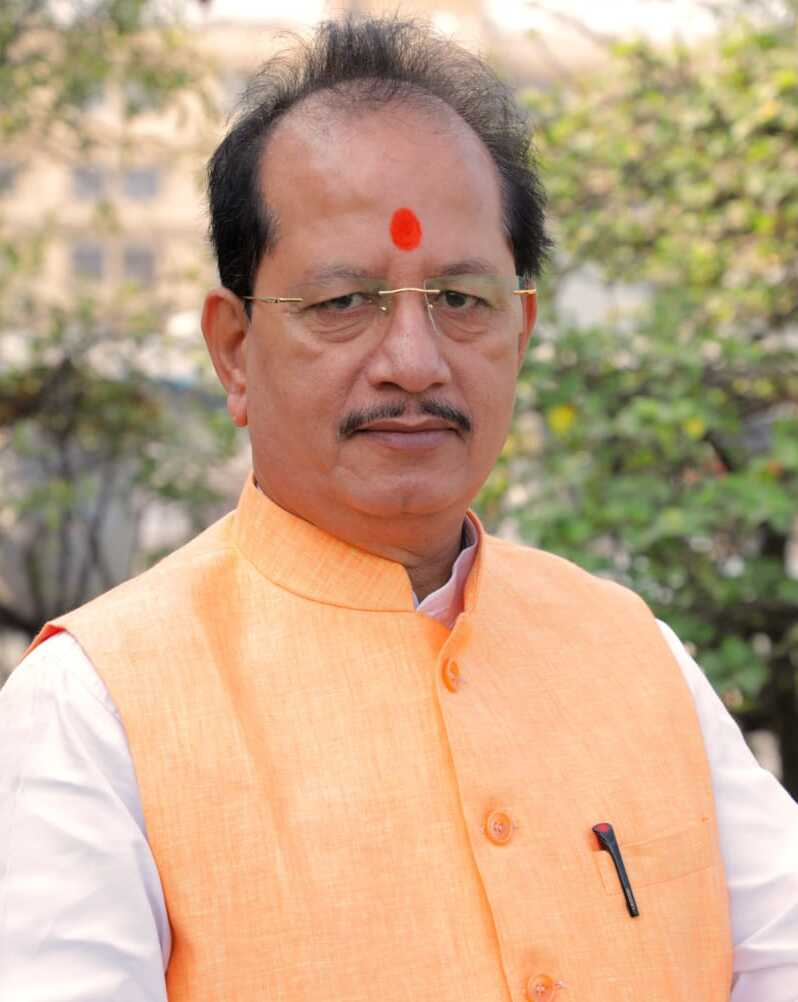
- Sinha in 2024

Minister of Agriculture of Bihar
- Incumbent
- Assumed office 7 May 2026
- Chief Minister: Samrat Choudhary
- Preceded by: Samrat Choudhary (as Chief Minister)
- In office 26 February 2025 – 20 November 2025
- Chief Minister: Nitish Kumar
- Preceded by: Mangal Pandey
- Succeeded by: Ram Kripal Yadav

Deputy Chief Minister of Bihar
- In office 28 January 2024 – 15 April 2026 Serving with Samrat Choudhary
- Chief Minister: Nitish Kumar
- Preceded by: Tejashwi Yadav
- Succeeded by: Vijay Kumar Chaudhary; Bijendra Prasad Yadav

Minister of Revenue and Land Reforms of Bihar
- In office 20 November 2025 – 15 April 2026
- Chief Minister: Nitish Kumar; Samrat Choudhary
- Preceded by: Sanjay Saraogi
- Succeeded by: Samrat Choudhary

Minister of Urban Development and Housing of Bihar
- In office 16 December 2025 – 15 April 2026
- Chief Minister: Nitish Kumar
- Preceded by: Nitin Nabin
- Succeeded by: Samrat Choudhary

Minister of Mines and Geology of Bihar
- In office 28 January 2024 – 15 April 2025
- Chief Minister: Nitish Kumar
- Preceded by: Ramanand Yadav
- Succeeded by: Samrat Choudhary

Minister of Road Construction of Bihar
- In office 28 January 2024 – 26 February 2025
- Chief Minister: Nitish Kumar
- Preceded by: Tejashwi Yadav
- Succeeded by: Nitin Nabin

Minister of Art, Culture and Youth Affairs of Bihar
- In office 28 January 2024 – 26 February 2025
- Chief Minister: Nitish Kumar
- Preceded by: Jitendra Kumar Ray
- Succeeded by: Moti Lal Prasad

Leader of the Opposition in the Bihar Legislative Assembly
- In office 24 August 2022 – 28 January 2024
- Chief Minister: Nitish Kumar
- Preceded by: Tejashwi Yadav
- Succeeded by: Tejashwi Yadav

Speaker of the Bihar Legislative Assembly
- In office 25 November 2020 – 24 August 2022
- Preceded by: Vijay Kumar Chaudhary
- Succeeded by: Awadh Bihari Choudhary

Minister of Labour Resources of Bihar
- In office 29 July 2017 – 16 November 2020
- Chief Minister: Nitish Kumar
- Preceded by: Vijay Prakash Yadav
- Succeeded by: Jibesh Kumar

Member of the Bihar Legislative Assembly
- Incumbent
- Assumed office 24 November 2010
- Preceded by: Fulaina Singh
- Constituency: Lakhisarai

Personal details
- Born: 5 June 1967 (age 59) Tilakpur, Bihar, India
- Party: Bharatiya Janata Party
- Spouse: Sushila Devi (m. 1986)
- Children: 4
- Profession: Politician

Vijay Kumar Sinha is an Indian politician who served as the 8th Deputy Chief Minister of Bihar along with Samrat Choudhary under Nitish Kumar as Chief Minister from January 2024 till April 2026. He is also serving as the Minister of Agriculture of Bihar. He was earlier the leader of the opposition in the Bihar Legislative Assembly. He is a member of the Bharatiya Janata Party and a member of Bihar Legislative Assembly from Lakhisarai constituency since 2010.

He was the Speaker of the Bihar Legislative Assembly from 25 November 2020 to 24 August 2022. Vijay Sinha resigned from his post following a no-confidence motion moved against him by the then-ruling Mahagathbandhan.

== Early life and education ==
Sinha was born on 5 June 1967 in Tilakpur, Bihar. According to his election affidavit summary, he completed a civil engineering diploma from State Polytechnic, Begusarai.

== Political career ==
Sinha has represented the Lakhisarai constituency in the Bihar Legislative Assembly as a Bharatiya Janata Party candidate. He served as Minister of Labour Resources in the Government of Bihar from 29 July 2017 to 16 November 2020.

He was elected Speaker of the Bihar Legislative Assembly on 25 November 2020. He resigned from the post on 24 August 2022 after a no-confidence motion was moved against him following a change in the ruling coalition.

After leaving the Speaker's office, Sinha served as Leader of the Opposition in the Bihar Legislative Assembly from 24 August 2022 to 28 January 2024. On 28 January 2024, he was appointed Deputy Chief Minister of Bihar along with Samrat Choudhary in the government headed by Nitish Kumar.

== Offices held ==
Office	Start	End	Notes
Minister of Agriculture, Bihar	7 May 2026	Incumbent	Under Chief Minister Samrat Choudhary
Deputy Chief Minister of Bihar	28 January 2024	20 November 2025	Served alongside Samrat Choudhary
Deputy Chief Minister of Bihar	20 November 2025	15 April 2026	Continued after the 2025 government formation
Minister of Revenue and Land Reforms, Bihar	20 November 2025	15 April 2026	Portfolio held during his Deputy Chief Minister tenure
Minister of Urban Development and Housing, Bihar	16 December 2025	15 April 2026	Portfolio held during his Deputy Chief Minister tenure
Minister of Agriculture, Bihar	26 February 2025	20 November 2025	Under Chief Minister Nitish Kumar
Minister of Road Construction, Bihar	28 January 2024	26 February 2025	Under Chief Minister Nitish Kumar
Minister of Art, Culture and Youth Affairs, Bihar	28 January 2024	26 February 2025	Under Chief Minister Nitish Kumar
Minister of Mines and Geology, Bihar	28 January 2024	15 April 2025	Under Chief Minister Nitish Kumar
Leader of the Opposition, Bihar Legislative Assembly	24 August 2022	28 January 2024	Succeeded Tejashwi Yadav
Speaker of the Bihar Legislative Assembly	25 November 2020	24 August 2022	Succeeded Vijay Kumar Chaudhary
Minister of Labour Resources, Bihar	29 July 2017	16 November 2020	Under Chief Minister Nitish Kumar
Member of Bihar Legislative Assembly	24 November 2010	Incumbent	Lakhisarai constituency

== Speaker of the Bihar Legislative Assembly ==
Sinha served as Speaker of the Bihar Legislative Assembly from 25 November 2020 to 24 August 2022. His election as Speaker was reported by national news outlets in November 2020. He resigned from the post in August 2022 after a no-confidence motion was moved against him.

== Deputy Chief Minister of Bihar ==
Sinha served as Deputy Chief Minister of Bihar from January 2024 to April 2026. He held several portfolios during this period, including Road Construction, Art, Culture and Youth Affairs, Mines and Geology, Revenue and Land Reforms, Urban Development and Housing, and Agriculture.

== Revenue and Land Reforms Minister ==
Sinha served as Minister of Revenue and Land Reforms from 20 November 2025 to 15 April 2026.

In January 2026, The Times of India reported that Sinha said action against land mafias would be taken by March and referred to steps for improving transparency in the land administration system.

In a February 2026 interview with The New Indian Express, Sinha said that the state government had "zero tolerance" for corruption in land-related matters and had launched a campaign against land mafia and officials involved in corrupt practices in land registration.

In March 2026, while holding the Revenue and Land Reforms portfolio, Sinha said that he had authorised rules-based action against striking revenue and circle officers who did not return to duty after a government ultimatum.

== Agriculture Minister ==
Sinha served as Agriculture Minister of Bihar from February 2025 to November 2025 and again assumed the office in May 2026. In May 2026, he launched the second phase of issuing farmer IDs under the Agri Stack programme for remaining beneficiaries in Bihar.

== Electoral record ==
Year	Constituency	Party	Result	Notes
2010	Lakhisarai	Bharatiya Janata Party	Elected	
2015	Lakhisarai	Bharatiya Janata Party	Elected	
2020	Lakhisarai	Bharatiya Janata Party	Elected	
2025	Lakhisarai	Bharatiya Janata Party	Elected	Received 122,408 votes and defeated Indian National Congress candidate Amaresh Kumar by 24,940 votes.

== Personal life ==
Sinha is married to Sushila Devi. The couple have four children.
