= Vijay Kumar Chaudhary =

Indian politician (born 1957)

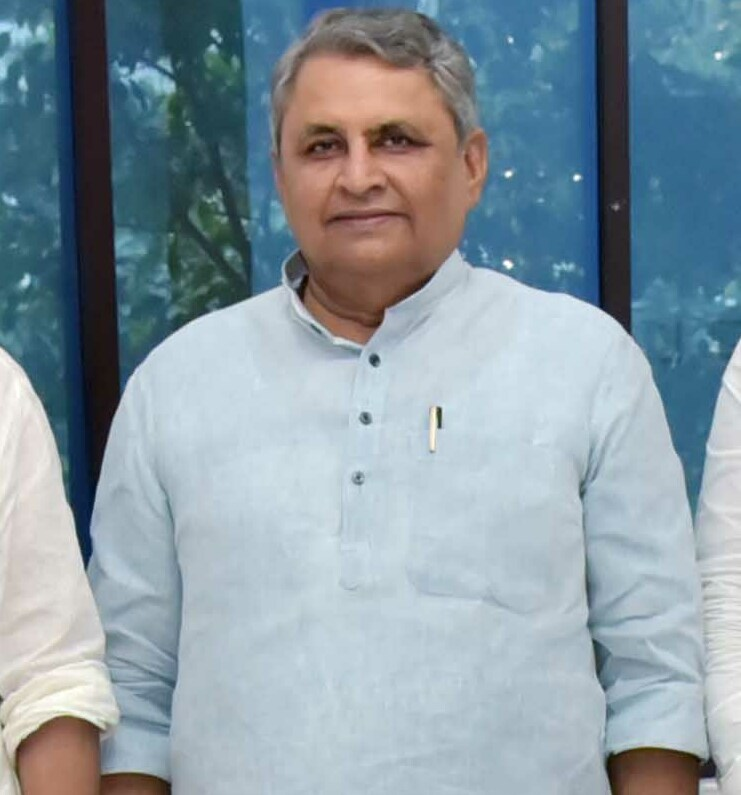
- Chaudhary in 2020

Deputy Chief Minister of Bihar
- Incumbent
- Assumed office 15 April 2026 Serving with Bijendra Prasad Yadav
- Governor: Syed Ata Hasnain
- Chief Minister: Samrat Choudhary
- Ministry or Department: Water Resources; Parliamentary Affairs
- Preceded by: Samrat Choudhary and Vijay Kumar Sinha

Cabinet Minister in Bihar
- In office 16 March 2024 – 14 April 2026
- Chief Minister: Nitish Kumar
- Ministry and Departments: Water Resources; Parliamentary Affairs
- In office 3 February 2024 – 15 March 2024
- Chief Minister: Nitish Kumar
- Ministry and Departments: Water Resources; Education; Building Construction; Transport; Information & Public Relations; Parliamentary Affairs
- In office 22 August 2022 – 28 January 2024
- Chief Minister: Nitish Kumar
- Ministry and Departments: Finance; Commercial Taxes; Parliamentary Affairs
- In office 9 February 2021 – 10 August 2022
- Chief Minister: Nitish Kumar
- Ministry and Departments: Education; Parliamentary Affairs
- In office 16 November 2020 – 8 February 2021
- Chief Minister: Nitish Kumar
- Ministry and Departments: Water Resources; Rural Works; Rural Development; Information & Public Relations; Parliamentary Affairs
- In office 22 February 2015 – 16 November 2015
- Chief Minister: Nitish Kumar
- Ministry and Departments: Water Resources; Agriculture; Information & Public Relations
- In office 26 November 2010 – 7 February 2015
- Chief Minister: Nitish Kumar
- Ministry and Departments: Water Resources

15th Speaker of the Bihar Legislative Assembly
- In office 2 December 2015 – 15 November 2020
- Governor: Ram Nath Kovind; Keshari Nath Tripathi; Satya Pal Malik; Lalji Tandon; Phagu Chauhan
- Preceded by: Uday Narayan Choudhary
- Succeeded by: Vijay Kumar Sinha

Leader of the Opposition in Bihar Legislative Assembly
- In office 19 February 2015 – 20 February 2015

President of Janata Dal (United), Bihar
- In office 14 February 2010 – 26 November 2010

Member of Bihar Legislative Assembly
- Incumbent
- Assumed office 24 November 2010
- Preceded by: Ramchandra Singh Nishad
- Constituency: Sarairanjan
- In office 1981–1995
- Preceded by: Jagdish Prasad Chaudhary
- Succeeded by: Ram Lakhan Mahato
- Constituency: Dalsinghsarai

Personal details
- Born: 8 January 1957 (age 69) Dalsinghsarai, Bihar, India
- Party: Janata Dal (United)
- Spouse: Ganga Choudhary
- Children: 2 (1 daughter & 1 son)
- Education: Patna University (M.A.) in History
- Profession: Politician probationary officer
- Website: https://www.vidhansabha.bih.nic.in

Vijay Kumar Chaudhary (born 8 January 1957) is an Indian politician serving as a Deputy Chief Minister of Bihar since 15 April 2026. He has been a member of Bihar Legislative Assembly since 1982, and has constantly served in Chief Minister Nitish Kumar's cabinets.

He has previously held the posts of Speaker of Bihar Vidhan Sabha, Leader of Janata Dal (United) Legislature Party in Bihar Legislative Assembly and the Minister for Finance, Commercial Taxes, Education, Building Construction, Transport, Rural Development, Rural Works, Science, Technology and Technical Education, Higher Education, Minority Welfare, Information & Public Relations, Agriculture, Animal and Fish Resources ministries in the Government of Bihar. He is a member of Nitish Kumar's core committee which shapes policies of the Government and the party.

Chaudhary has also served as the Home Minister-in-charge, putting forth the Government's stand on home affairs in Bihar Legislative Assembly. Known for being an efficient administrator and a soft-spoken person with a clean image, he is a close confidante of Nitish Kumar.

== Early life and career ==
Choudhary was born in Dalsinghsarai, Samastipur district of Bihar in a Bhumihar Brahmin family. His father, Jagdish Prasad Chaudhary, had been a freedom fighter, an Indian National Congress politician and a three term member of the Bihar Legislative Assembly from the Dalsinghsarai constituency. He completed his Master of Arts in history from Patna University in 1979 and joined the State Bank of India as a Probationary Officer in Trivandrum in the same year.

== Political career ==
After the demise of his legislator father in 1982, Chaudhary resigned from his job and won the subsequent by-election from Dalsinghsarai on a Congress ticket. He was re-elected from Dalsinghsarai for two more terms in 1985 and 1990. During this stint as a legislator from 1982 to 1995, he served as the Deputy Chairman of Bihar State Industrial Development Corporation (BSIDC) and Deputy Chief Whip of the Congress Legislature Party (CLP). He sought re-election again from Dalsinghsarai in 1995 and 2000 but lost the polls. Chaudhary served as General Secretary of Bihar Pradesh Congress Committee from 2000 to 2005. He joined JD(U) in 2005 and unsuccessfully contested the October 2005 Bihar Legislative Assembly election from Sarairanjan. He was appointed as the General Secretary and Chief Spokesperson of the party in 2008. He continued to serve in this capacity until February 2010, when he was nominated as the President of Bihar JD(U) and led the party during its victory in 2010 Bihar Legislative Assembly election. He himself won the election from Sarairanjan (Vidhan Sabha constituency) with a margin of 17557 votes and was inducted as the Water Resources Minister in the newly formed cabinet, assuming charge on 26 November 2010.

In the 2015 Bihar Political Crisis, he was briefly elected as the Leader of JD(U) Legislature Party in the Bihar Legislative Assembly and was subsequently recognized as the Leader of Opposition.. Later, he was inducted as the Minister for Water Resources with the additional charge of Agriculture, Information & Public Relations and Animal and Fish Resources Departments.

He retained his Sarairanjan (Vidhan Sabha constituency) in 2015 elections with a margin of 34044 votes. He was elected unopposed to the post of Speaker of Bihar Legislative Assembly on 2 December 2015 after consensus was generated on his name among all political parties of the state, including the Opposition BJP. He was re-elected from Sarairanjan (Vidhan Sabha constituency) in the 2020 and 2025 elections, winning with a margin of 3624 and 20,798 votes respectively. During 2020-2025, he served as a Minister in the cabinet of Nitish Kumar, holding multiple portfolios, notable being Education, Finance and Water Resources. Post victory in the 2025 Bihar Assembly elections, he was reinducted in the cabinet and continued to serve as a minister till April 2026, after which he was elevated to Deputy Chief Minister, following the resignation of Nitish Kumar and election of Samrat Choudhary as the NDA Legislature Party Leader.

== Achievements ==
As Water Resources Minister, Chaudhary is credited with the completion of Durgawati Reservoir in 2014, a massive irrigation project started in 1976 which got delayed by 38 years due to land acquisition and environmental clearance related issues. His tenure (2010–2015) saw no major floods after the 2008 Bihar flood. Under his leadership, the Water Resources Ministry launched eight river-linking projects at a cost of Rs 4442 crores.

As Speaker of the Legislative Assembly, Chaudhary brought 44 amendments to the Rules of Procedure and Conduct of Business, the most significant of them being the introduction of the concept of 'Confidence Motion' under Rule 109(A), wherein the Government of the day can move a motion to seek confidence from the House. Bihar is the only state in the country with a rule to deal with confidence motion moved by Government of the day. The Nitish Kumar government, with BJP and other NDA constituents as allies, was the first to move a confidence motion in the Assembly, on 28 July 2017, to prove its majority in the lower House. He also amended rules to allow inclusion of MLCs in House Committees dealing with financial matters.

He introduced a Question Reply Management System (QRMS) for online receipt of questions from MLAs and provision of answers by concerned Government departments through the same channel. To bring transparency in the recruitment policy of the Legislative Assembly Secretariat, he divested the Office of Speaker of powers of recruitment and awarded the job to a Central agency, also responsible for recruitment in Parliament of India through a competitive and fair process. He has also initiated the implementation of the National e-Vidhan Application Project to make Bihar Legislative Assembly paperless.

He organized workshops to facilitate dialogue between the civil society and legislators for more informed lawmaking. He has also been organizing blood donation camps on the Assembly's foundation day wherein legislators donate blood for use by needy patients.

Under his leadership as the Chairman of the Commonwealth Parliamentary Association Bihar Chapter, the Bihar Legislative Assembly successfully organised the annual conference of Commonwealth Parliamentary Association India Region, attended by both national and international dignitaries, including Chairperson of the Commonwealth Parliamentary Association Emilia Monjowa Lifaka.

== Personal life ==
He is married to Ganga Choudhary. The couple has a son and a daughter.
