= Samrat Choudhary =

Chief Minister of Bihar since 2026

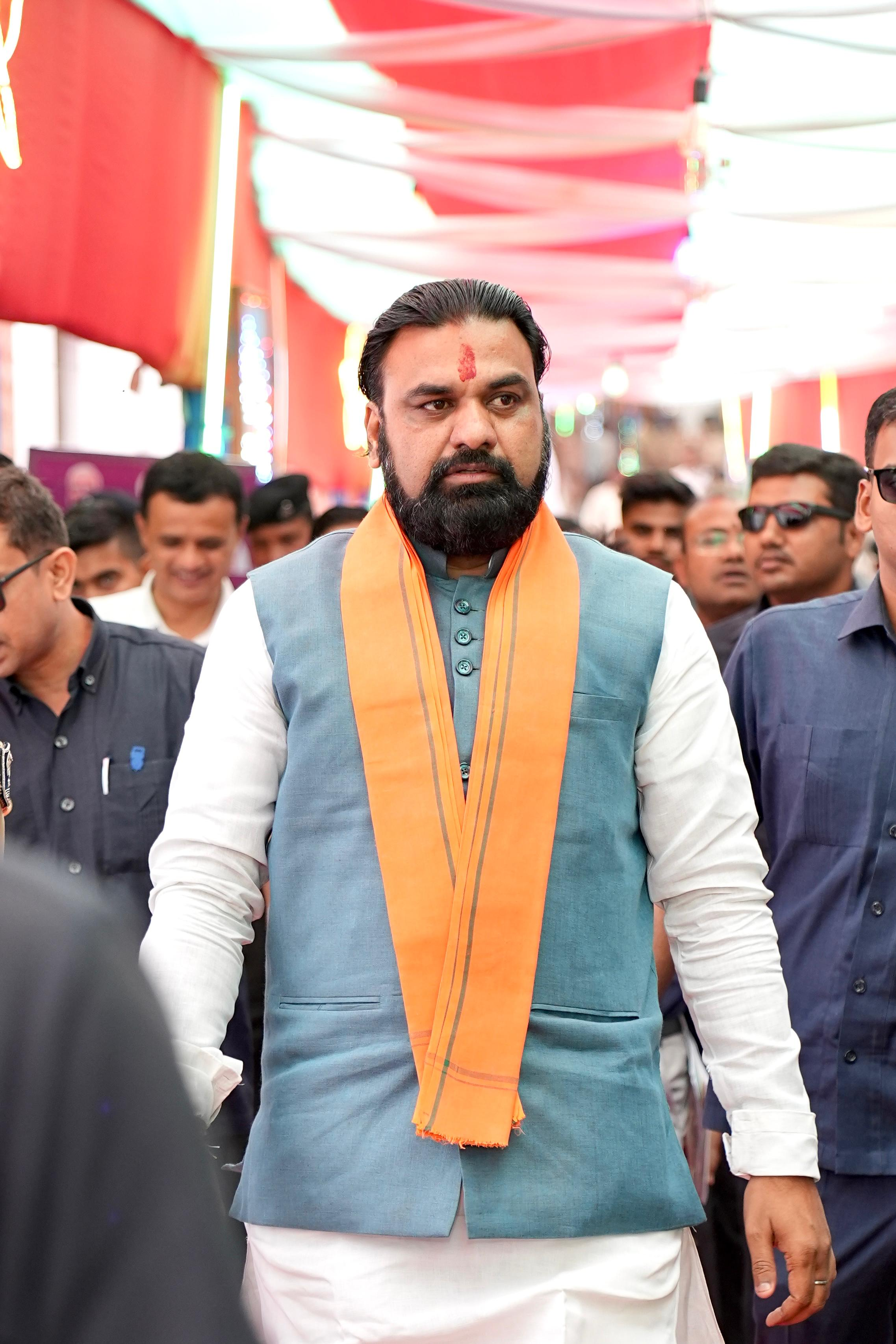
- Choudhary in 2026

24th Chief Minister of Bihar
- Incumbent
- Assumed office 15 April 2026
- Governor: Syed Ata Hasnain
- Deputy: Vijay Kumar Chaudhary; Bijendra Prasad Yadav
- Departments: List: •General Administration; •Home; •Cabinet Secretariat; •Civil Aviation; •Vigilance; •Election; Departments not allotted to any minister
- Preceded by: Nitish Kumar

Deputy Chief Minister of Bihar
- In office 28 January 2024 – 15 April 2026 Serving with Vijay Kumar Sinha
- Chief Minister: Nitish Kumar
- Preceded by: Tejashwi Yadav
- Succeeded by: Bijendra Prasad Yadav; Vijay Kumar Chaudhary

Cabinet Minister in Bihar
- In office 28 January 2024 – 14 April 2026; 9 February 2021 – 9 August 2022; 19 May 1999 – 16 November 1999
- Chief Minister: Nitish Kumar; Jitan Ram Manjhi; Rabri Devi

Leader of the Opposition in Bihar Legislative Council
- In office 24 August 2022 – 20 August 2023
- Chief Minister: Nitish Kumar
- Preceded by: Rabri Devi
- Succeeded by: Hari Sahni

Member of Bihar Legislative Council
- In office 29 June 2020 – 14 November 2025
- Constituency: Elected by the MLAs
- In office 24 May 2014 – 6 January 2016
- Constituency: Nominated

Member of Bihar Legislative Assembly
- Incumbent
- Assumed office 14 November 2025
- Preceded by: Rajeev Kushwaha
- Constituency: Tarapur
- In office 24 November 2010 – 8 November 2014
- Preceded by: Ramanand Prasad Singh
- Succeeded by: Ramanand Prasad Singh
- Constituency: Parbatta
- In office 2000–2004
- Preceded by: Vidya Sagar Nishad
- Succeeded by: Ramanand Prasad Singh
- Constituency: Parbatta

Personal details
- Born: 16 November 1968 (age 57) Lakhanpur, Bihar, India
- Party: BJP (since 2017)
- Other political affiliations: JD(U) (2014-2017); RJD (1999-2014); SAP (1990-1999)
- Spouse: Mamta Kumari
- Children: 2
- Parents: Shakuni Choudhary (father); Parvati Devi (mother)
- Education: Madurai Kamaraj University
- Occupation: Politician
- Cabinet Portfolios in the Government of Bihar Minister of Home Affairs (20 November 2025 – 14 April 2026): ← Nitish Kumar; himself (as Chief Minister) →; Minister of Finance (28 January 2024 – 20 November 2025): ← Vijay Chaudhary; Bijendra Yadav →; Minister of Sports (28 January 2024 – 15 March 2024): ← Surendra Mehta; Jitendra Kumar Rai →; Minister of Panchayat Raj (9 February 2021 – 9 August 2022): ← Renu Devi; Murari Prasad Gautam →; Minister of Urban Development & Housing (2 June 2014 – 20 February 2015) Minister of Horticulture, Weights and Measurement (19 May 1999 – 16 November 1999)

Samrat Choudhary (born 16 November 1968) is an Indian politician who is serving as the 24th Chief Minister of Bihar since 15 April 2026. He has been a member of the Bihar Legislative Assembly representing Tarapur Assembly constituency since 2025 and previously served as deputy chief minister of Bihar in the Nitish Kumar government from 2024 to 2026. Choudhary is the first Bharatiya Janata Party (BJP) member to serve as Chief Minister of Bihar.

He was previously associated with Rashtriya Janata Dal and Janata Dal (United). Choudhary was also a member of the Bihar Legislative Council from 2014 to 2016 and again from 2020 to 2025. In addition, he previously represented Parbatta in the Bihar Legislative Assembly from 2000 to 2004 and again from 2010 to 2014, and served as the party president of BJP Bihar state unit from March 2023 to 25 July 2024. In 2022, he was selected as the Leader of Opposition in Bihar Legislative Council.

== Life and education ==
Samrat Choudhary was born on 16 November 1968 in Lakhanpur village of Munger. His mother, Parvati Devi, and father Shakuni Choudhary, were also Bihari politicians. After completing his basic education, he received higher education from Madurai Kamaraj University. His educational qualifications have become a subject of public controversy. Choudhary belongs to Koeri Kushwaha caste, and he has been the OBC face of the BJP. Choudhary is married to Mamta Kumari; the pair have one son and one daughter. His birth name is Rakesh Kumar.

== Early political career ==
Choudhary was involved with politics since the early 1990s, and was involved with the Samata Party. Along with his father and mother, and numerous other politicians from the Samata Party, he joined the Rashtriya Janata Dal in 1999. On 19 May 1999, he was sworn in as the Minister of Horticulture, Weights and Measurement in the ministry of Rabri Devi. During his appointment, he was neither a member of the Legislative Assembly not the Legislative Council. However, allegations of his ineligibility due to being underage at the time led to his removal from the post on 16 November 1999. Subsequently, in the 2000 elections, he was elected to the Bihar Legislative Assembly from Parbatta constituency as a member of the RJD. In the same election, his father Sakuni Choudhary was elected to the legislative assembly and later appointed as a minister in the Rabri Devi ministry. In 2003, Sushil Kumar Modi of the Bharatiya Janata Party alleged that when Samrat Choudhary filled his nomination, he was ineligible due to his age. Later, Modi fought a legal battle against Choudhary, and this resulted in his election being declared void by the court. Afterwards, a by-election was conducted in 2004, and Samrat Choudhary fought the election unsuccessfully. He lost to Ramanand Prasad Singh of the Janata Dal (United). He was finally elected to that seat in 2010. In 2010, he was made the chief whip of the opposition in the Bihar Legislative Assembly. He later joined the JD(U), and served as a cabinet minister in the Jitan Ram Manjhi ministry. On 2 June 2014, he was sworn in and took charge as Minister of Urban Development and Housing Department. From 2014 to 2016, and again from 2020 to 2025, he served in the Bihar Legislative Council as an MLC.

=== Bharatiya Janata Party ===
In 2018, he was made the vice president of Bihar state unit of the BJP after joining the party in 2017. He further rose to prominence during the 2020 Bihar Legislative Assembly election, when Choudhary was made a star campaigner for the BJP's National Democratic Alliance.

In 2021, he was made Panchayati Raj minister in the expanded cabinet of Nitish Kumar. In March 2021, he gained nationwide attention for getting embroiled in a strong argument with the speaker of Bihar Legislative Assembly, Vijay Kumar Sinha. The speaker was seeking his reply on a question that was raised by an MLA, regarding the work of his department. Later, he apologized to the speaker for violating the decorum of the house. The Panchayati Raj Ministry under him took several steps for promoting better organisational structure, like recruitment of more staff in the sanitation department, as well as paving the way for safe disposal of dead carcasses of stray animals.

In March 2023, Choudhary was appointed party president of the BJP for the state of Bihar, replacing Sanjay Jaiswal. As per political analysts, the step was taken by party leadership to create a strong foundation among the voters of Koeri or the Kushwaha caste, which dominated many of the districts of Bihar and was recorded as the second largest caste group after the Yadavs in the state. After his appointment to the post of state chief of BJP, Rabri Devi commented, "it seems BJP has turned its back from the Banias and that's why they have raised a Mahto to the post of president."

In 2023, while speaking to a gathering of BJP political workers in Begusarai, union minister Giriraj Singh projected Choudhary as the chief ministerial candidate of BJP for 2025 Bihar Legislative Assembly election.

Choudhary holds the anti-illegal immigrant ideology, which is promoted by the BJP in the frontier states of India. In June 2023, while addressing a rally at Purnia, Choudhary promised to the audience that if the government of BJP is formed in the state of Bihar, they will drive all illegal Bangladeshi immigrants from the Muslim dominated region of Bihar called Simanchal. Choudhary also believes in existence of Love Jihad, the process of Muslim men trapping Hindu girls, and converting them into Islam for marriage. In one of his media briefings, Choudhary said that all the Love Jihad cases pending in Bihar will be probed if the BJP wins the 2025 Bihar assembly elections.

In July 2023, Choudhary, along with Vijay Kumar Sinha and other BJP leaders organised a protest on the question of ten lakh jobs that were promised by the Mahagathbandhan government of Nitish Kumar and Tejashwi Yadav. The protest was led by Choudhary and Sinha along with BJP workers. However, when the mob reached Dak Bangla Square, Patna Police initiated lathi charge on BJP workers. A worker of the BJP from Jahanabad died due to severe injuries, while many other leaders, like Janardan Singh Sigriwal, were also beaten. In the aftermath of the protest, Choudhary, in his statement, blamed the incumbent government of Nitish Kumar for the death of their worker. The BJP leaders were also protesting against the teacher recruitment policy of the Nitish Kumar government and the domicile issue. The government had allowed the candidate outside the state of Bihar to take the recruitment examination; hence, there was dissatisfaction in one section of local candidates from the state. However, Choudhary, along with all major state leaders of the BJP, were arrested during the protest.

Choudhary had supported the drive of the Bihar government for conducting a caste census in the state and at an all-India level. Amidst claims that Bharatiya Janata Party and its leaders are against caste census, Choudhary declared in BJP's Other Backward Class convention at Khagaria in 2021 that he and his party are not against caste census and the BJP has always given representation to numerically small caste groups, which are vulnerable to being subsumed by the dominant castes. He also pointed towards the appointment of Renu Devi and Tarkishore Prasad as Deputy CM by BJP to support his arguments as both belonged to Backward Caste. On 2 October 2023, after the Government of Bihar published the data of caste census, Choudhary reiterated his statement and clarified that the release of data won't change the political standing and policies of the party as they have always worked towards proportional representation for all the castes.

== Deputy Chief Minister of Bihar (2024–2026) ==
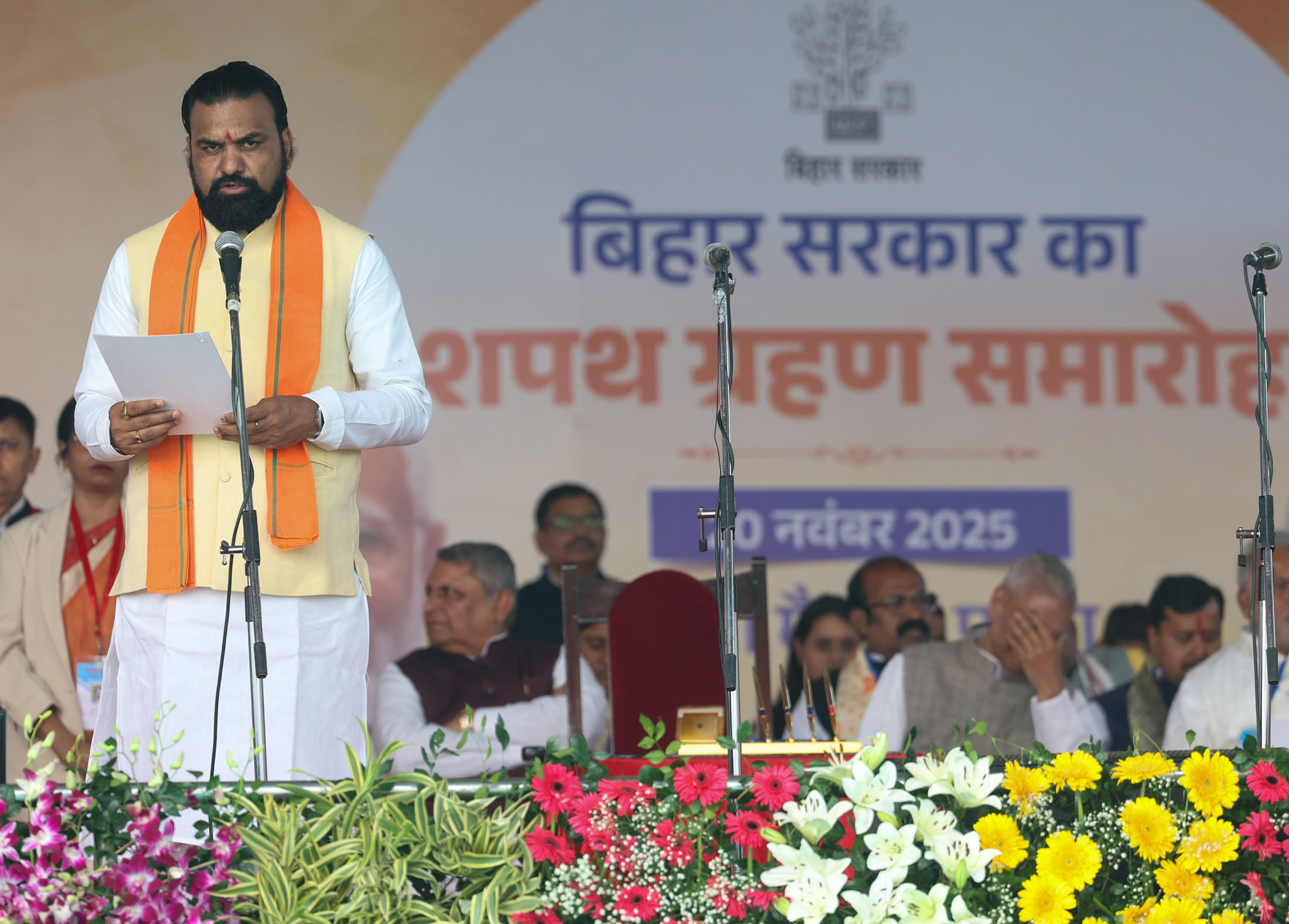
Chaudhary taking oath as Deputy Chief Minister of Bihar.

In January 2024, chief minister Nitish Kumar resigned from the INDIA Alliance and formed a government with the BJP's NDA Alliance. In the new government, Choudhary became Minister of Sport, Finance, and deputy chief minister. He was also allocated important departments of health, commercial taxes, urban development and housing department, Panchayati Raj, industry, animal and fisheries resources, and planning. In 2024, he was also made the convener of Group of Ministers on Goods and Service Tax rate rationalisation panel.

On 13 February 2024, Choudhary presented a budget worth ₹2.79 lakh crore in the Bihar Legislative Assembly. This was one of the biggest budgets in the history of Bihar. Choudhary also announced that the growth rate of the state has achieved 10.64% mark, and a total of 2.5 crore people in the state have risen above the poverty level in the preceding years. As finance minister, he worked for the creation of more jobs in the government sector as per the NDA's poll promises. Choudhary announced the creation of 30,547 posts in various government departments after the administrative committee of the finance ministry sanctioned the creation of these posts under him.

On 26 July 2024, Choudhary was removed from the post of the BJP's state president for Bihar. It was done after the extensive discussion within the party leadership after the 2024 Lok Sabha election, in which it was concluded that he was unable to transfer the vote of the Kushwaha caste to the Bharatiya Janata Party. With his removal, Dilip Kumar Jaiswal, the party's member of the legislative council of Bihar, was appointed the new president of the Bihar unit of the BJP. Choudhary, however, continued to serve as the Deputy Chief Minister of Bihar.

In the 2025 Bihar Legislative Assembly election, Choudhary led the BJP's campaign, and he sought election in the Tarapur Assembly constituency. The BJP became the single largest party in the Bihar assembly, and Choudhary was then elected as the leader of the Bharatiya Janata Party's legislative party in Bihar.

=== Bihar Minister of Home Affairs ===
Immediately after the election, Choudhary took charge of the Ministry of Home Affairs in the Tenth Nitish Kumar ministry. Bihar saw strict police action against gangster Shivdutt Rai in the Begusarai district; many believed it to be the replication of 'law and order model of strict action against criminal gangs' followed by Uttar Pradesh CM Yogi Adityanath.

Choudhary launched various initiatives like deployment of Anti-Romeo squad to prevent the cases of eve teasing as well as crackdown on the mafias dealing with drugs, liquor and land grabbing. He announced the preparation of a list of four hundred such individuals, against whom measures such as the acquisition of property made through illegal means will be taken. Choudhary also launched an initiative to conduct proper surveillance of prisons. The measures such as 'Pink Policing' were also launched to ensure the safety of women at the public places.

In his tenure as home minister of Bihar, the Nitish Kumar government took strict action against encroachment of public places by illegal building structures. The government followed the model of taking down these structures across the state by deploying bulldozers across different districts of the state.

After a review meeting with senior police officials in December 2025, Choudhary announced the formation of the 'Abhay brigade' to ensure the safety of women at public and other sensitive places. He also launched a crime and criminal tracking network system for people-friendly policing. Choudhary directed that vehicles involved in illegal mining activities should be confiscated immediately and should be auctioned as soon as possible in a bid to restrict illegal mining.

To stop the cases of paper leak in competitive examinations of the state, Choudhary announced the formation of a special investigation team. He also planned to reduce the response time for the 'dial 112' emergency service to less than ten minutes.

On 7 December 2025, Choudhary announced the establishment of one hundred fast-track courts for the speedy disposal of cases to expedite justice delivery and reduce the pendency of cases.

Choudhary also took decisions like making the junta darbar (people's court) by every police station mandatory, which were earlier organized at the SP/SSP level. He also brought a resolution to stop the gunda banks (private money lending charging arbitrary interest) from functioning in the state.

In December 2025, Choudhary announced that residential schools would be opened in forty police lines (residential areas for policemen) across the state of Bihar in order to ensure quality education for children of police officials. He also made the medical insurance claim process for police officials cashless to mitigate cash crunch in times of need. The decision was also taken to open Jivika kitchens in police line to provide healthy and balanced diet for police officials.

== Chief Minister of Bihar (2026–present) ==
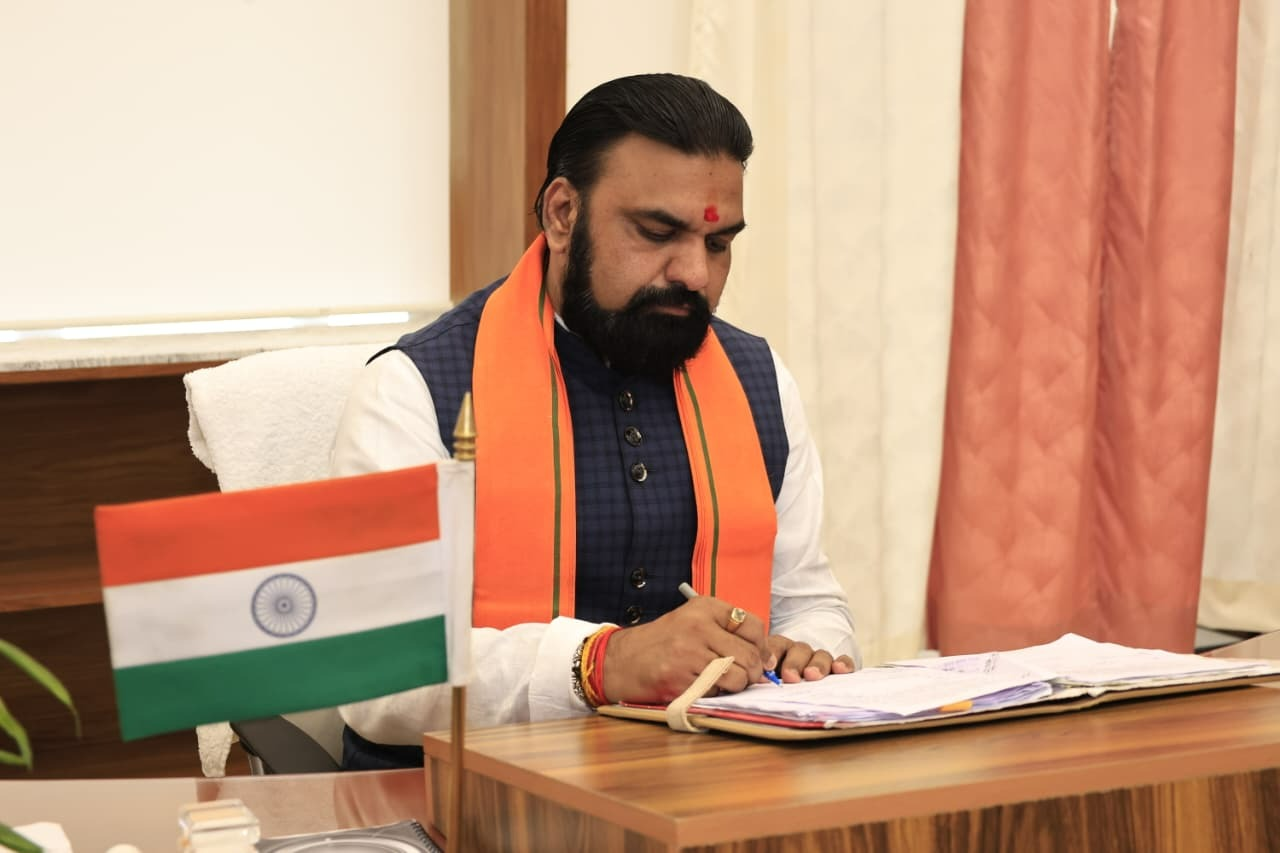
Samrat Chaudhary assuming the charges as Chief Minister of Bihar in 2026.

In March 2026, Nitish Kumar announced his intention to resign as CM to contest the 2026 Rajya Sabha elections. Choudhary was later elected leader of the Bihar BJP legislative party and was sworn in as Chief Minister of Bihar on 15 April. He is the first BJP politician to serve as Bihar's CM.

In May 2026, Chaudhary declared that private schools functioning in the state need to declare a proper fee structure in order to curb arbitrariness in expenditure on education. He also stated in a press briefing that students whose fee is pending shouldn't be barred from appearing in any examination.

In the earliest cabinet meetings, Chaudhary launched schemes to decongest the urban areas. His satellite township program aimed to develop planned cities by creating green spaces, wide roads and designated residential and commercial areas across ten districts of Bihar. The Police Didi scheme was launched to develop mutual trust between police and the girl students. As per plan, women police officials were deployed at the educational institutions and provides with government funded scooters to stop harassment and help girl students. A three tier helpline for public called Sahyog Triveni was also launched which included helpline, a website and camps at panchayat level by government officials to solve the problems of ordinary people.

In May 2026, Chaudhary led establishment of a technology centre in the Deogaon village of Gaya district. This centre equipped with sophisticated machines and training centre was established with a vision to create jobs in MSME sector by providing training to local youth in order to absorb them as skilled workforce in this sector.

In July 2026, Chaudhary launched a digital initiative for hassle free registration of property. Under this initiative, the people above the age of seventy five years in the state of Bihar could register for plot or other immovable property digitally from their home. This enable them to bypass long queues and multiple visits to registration centres.

Going along recommendation of central Finance Commission, Chaudhary government in July 2026 gave nod to Gram Panchayat Taxes, Rates, and Fees Rules, 2026. This rule enabled the rural local bodies, the Gram Panchayats to collect holding taxes annually from rural commercial and residential establishment. Chaudhary government planned to collect 1300 crore from these taxes and fees, proceeds from which was planned to be kept under Panchayats itself. It was further planned to be used for development of local infrastructure. This was considered as one of the first operational framework to strengthen the power of rural local bodies to collect revenue themselves and reduce the dependence on state government. This was considered to be the part of a wider plan to raise the internal revenue of state to 1 lakh crore by 2028.

In other to place Bihar on global tourism map, Chaudhary also launched 'heli tourism' service in 2026. Under this scheme, the aerial connectivity via helicopters was ensured at subsidised rate to tourist places of Bihar like Valmikinagar and Kaimur.

In his tenure, Government of Bihar signed a Memorandum of Understanding with Mahashakti group for setting up of an Integrated Steel Plant worth 6000 crore rupees for promoting industrial development in the Gaya district. In order to expedite the pending cases at judiciary and bring justice to undertrial prisoners, Chaudhary announced opening of hundred fast track courts in the state of Bihar, representing approximately 14 crore people.

== Electoral performance ==
Bihar Legislative Assembly
| Year | Constituency | Party | Votes | Votes in % | Opponent | Opponent Party | Votes | Votes in % | Margin | Margin in % | Result |
|---|---|---|---|---|---|---|---|---|---|---|---|
| 2000 | Parbatta | RJD | 48,202 | 34.69% | Ramanand Prasad Singh | IND | 35,425 | 25.49% | 12,777 | 9.2% | Won |
| 2010 | Parbatta | RJD | 60,428 | 42.81% | Ramanand Prasad Singh | JDU | 59,620 | 42.24% | 808 | 0.57% | Won |
| 2025 | Tarapur | BJP | 122,480 | 56.77% | Arun Kumar Shah | RJD | 76,637 | 35.52% | 45,843 | 21.25% | Won |

Bihar Legislative Council
| Year | Election | Result | Notes |
|---|---|---|---|
| 2014 | Bihar Legislative Council | Elected | |
| 2020 | Bihar Legislative Council | Elected | Unopposed |

== Controversies ==
Choudhary is known for his combative leadership style, which has caused controversies throughout his political career.

Reportedly, he attacked Chief Minister Nitish Kumar verbally on various occasions; in May 2023, while he was trying to meet a former five-time MLA of the BJP Jawahar Prasad, who was incarcerated in prison for his role in Ram Navami violence in Sasaram, he was stopped by authorities. On 3 May 2023, in a statement to the press, Choudhary accused Nitish Kumar of promoting criminals and targeting saints; he cited the release of former Member of Parliament and convicted criminal Anand Mohan Singh to support his claim.

In May 2023, he alleged that Janata Dal United (JDU) president Lalan Singh had served liquor at a feast organized in his Lok Sabha constituency Munger, despite knowing that the government of Bihar had imposed a ban on liquor since 2016. For his remark, he was criticised by JDU leaders. The state president of JDU, Umesh Singh Kushwaha, even passed a censure resolution against him at a meeting of the party. Kushwaha also commented that despite belonging to a political family, Choudhary lacks the decency required by a politician. At various occasions, Choudhary had also criticised Nitish Kumar for not promoting any Kushwaha or Kurmi leader, other than himself. He also alleged that Kumar used his peers for his own benefit.

In June 2023, taking a dig at Indian National Congress leader Rahul Gandhi, Choudhary compared the latter's bearded look to Osama bin Laden. He said, "Rahul Gandhi grows beard like Osama bin Laden and thinks that he would become like prime minister Narendra Modi".

In 2025, political strategist Prashant Kishor publicly alleged that Choudhary had misrepresented his age before the Supreme Court of India in connection with the 1995 Tarapur Murder Case. According to the allegation, forged documents were submitted to establish that he was a minor at the time of the incident. These claims have been reported in sections of the media but remain contested.

Choudhary was also involved in the so-called “underage minister” controversy in 1999 during the tenure of the Rabri Devi government. Questions were raised regarding his eligibility to hold ministerial office due to his age, leading to his resignation amid the dispute.

In addition, his political trajectory—spanning affiliations with the Rashtriya Janata Dal (RJD), Janata Dal (United) (JD(U)), Samata Party (SAP), Hindustani Awam Morcha (HAM), and later the Bharatiya Janata Party (BJP)—has drawn criticism from opponents, who have cited frequent party changes as indicative of shifting political loyalties.

Further scrutiny has arisen over alleged inconsistencies in his election affidavits, particularly concerning his stated age. Critics have pointed to differences between documents related to the 1995 case—where he was reportedly described as 15 years old—and later affidavits, including those submitted during the 2020 elections, which indicated a differing date of birth.

In April 2026, Choudhary faced criticism after opposition leaders circulated videos from his oath-taking ceremony as Chief Minister of Bihar, alleging that he struggled while reading the oath. Leaders of the Rashtriya Janata Dal (RJD) including supporters of Tejashwi Yadav, mocked the incident on social media and questioned his preparedness for office.

Political offices
| Preceded by Nitish Kumar | Chief Minister of Bihar; 2026 – present | Incumbent |
