= Balutola =

Village in Bihar, India

Balutola बालुटोला
- Village
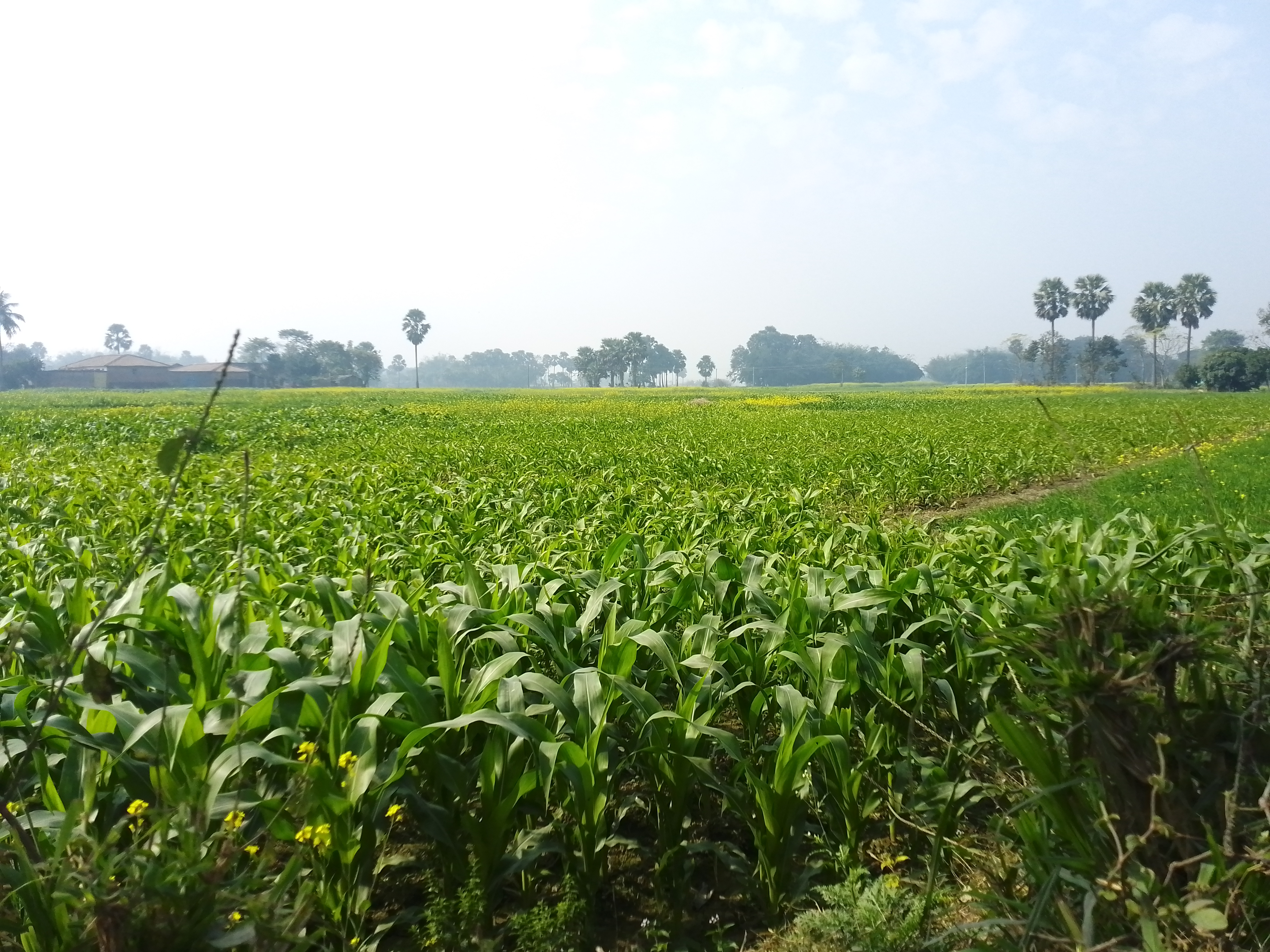
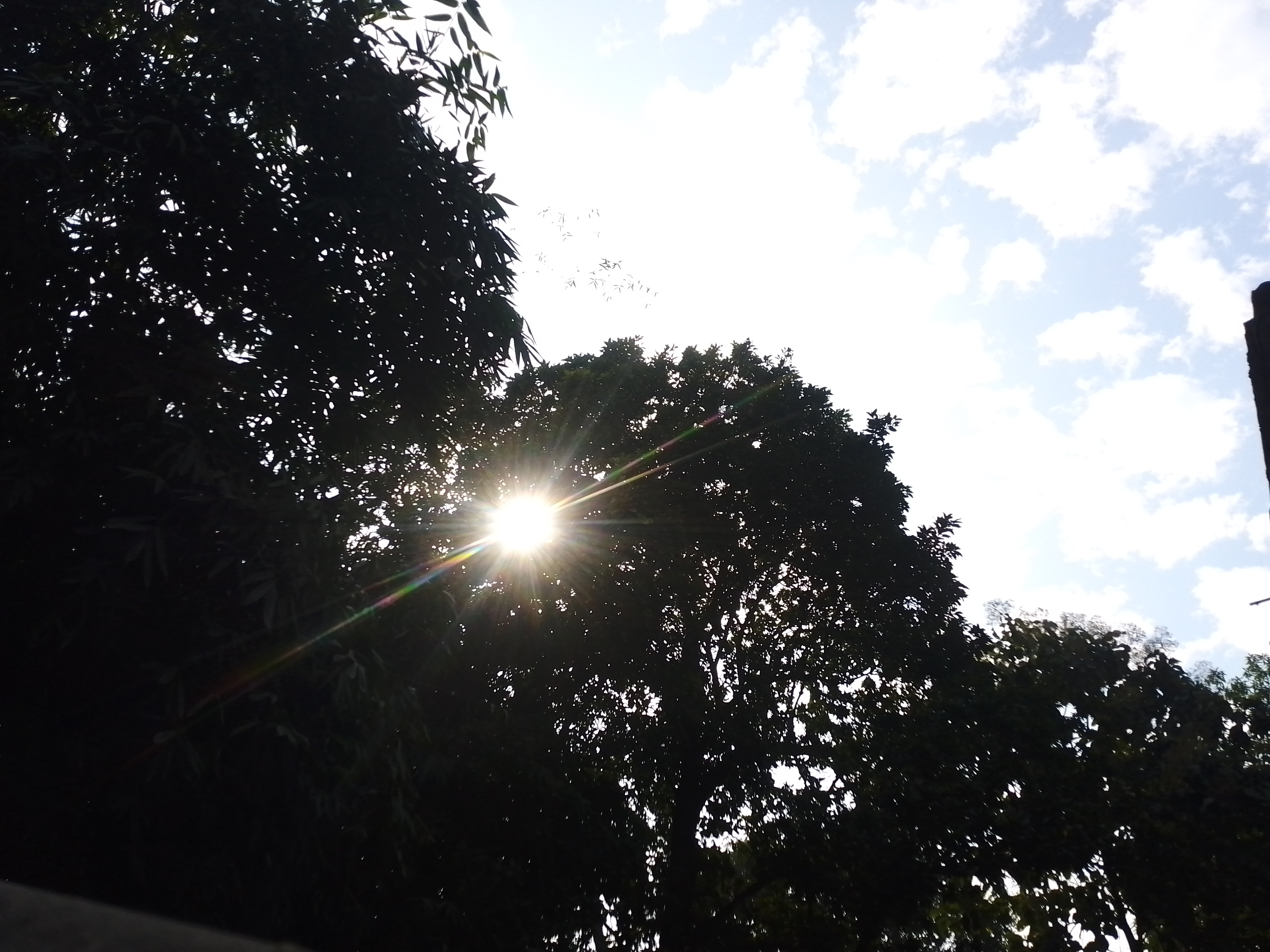
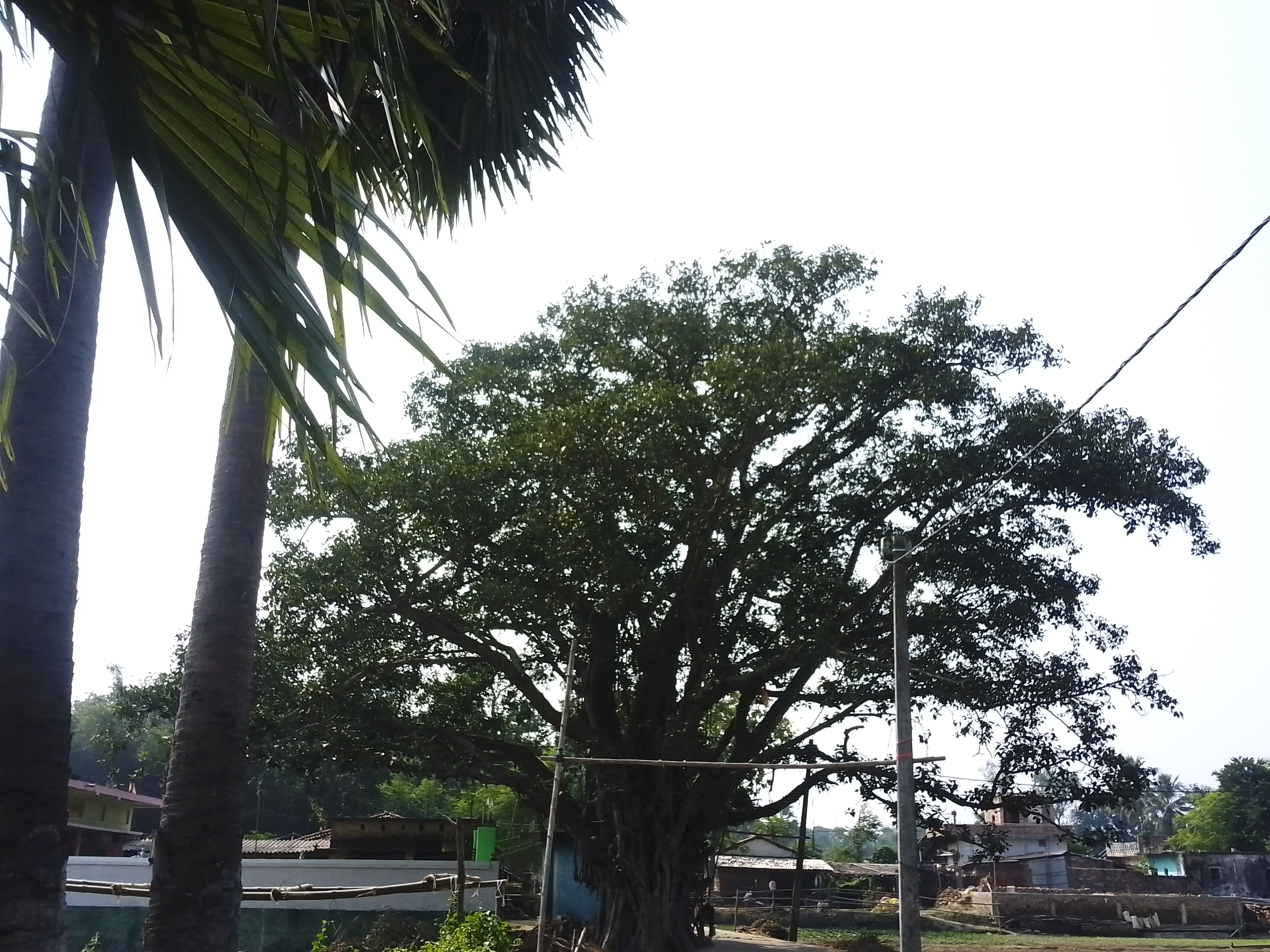
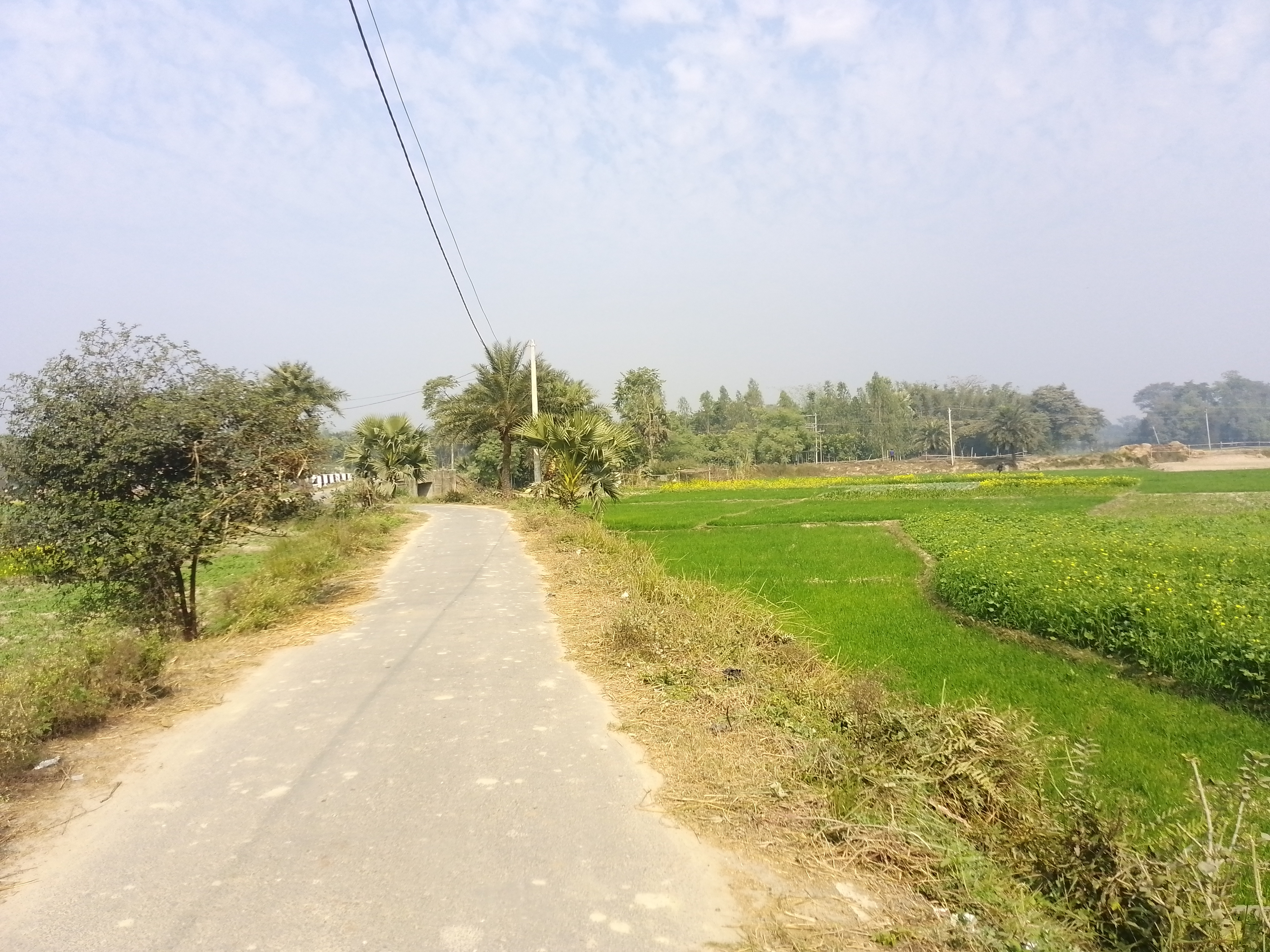
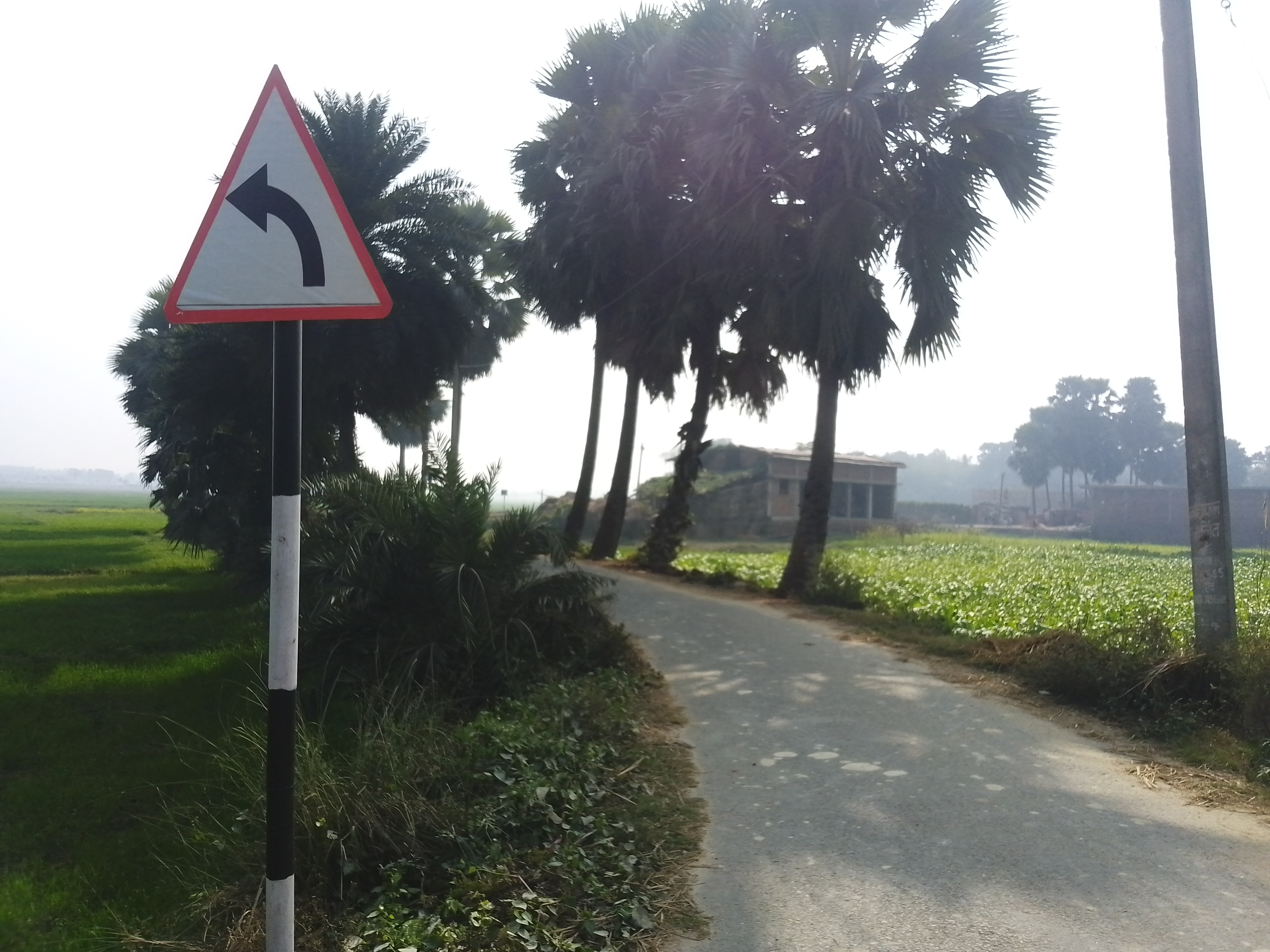
- Corn (Makai) Sky view Baba Raghuni Sthan Balutola Road Balutola village Greenery in Jan 2025

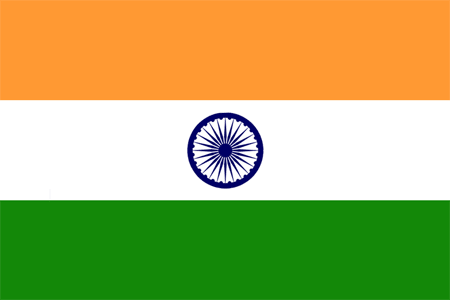
- Flag

- Location in Bihar, India Balutola (India)
- Coordinates: 25°45′42.11″N 86°34′59.41″E
- Country: India
- State: Bihar
- Region: Mithila
- District: Saharsa
- Named for: Baba Raghuni

Area
  - Total: 37.54 ha (92.8 acres)
- Elevation: 45 m (148 ft)

Population
  - Total: 409
  - Density: 1,090/km^{2} (2,820/sq mi)

Languages
  - Official: Hindi
  - Additional official: Urdu
  - Regional: Maithili
- Time zone: UTC+5:30 (IST)
- PIN: 852127
- Telephone code: 06478
- Vehicle registration: BR 19
- Ward Number: 5
- Sex ratio: 1000 females per 1000 males ♂/♀ ♂/♀

Balutola (Hindi: [Bəˈluːtoʊlɑː]) is a village in Saharsa situated in the south corner of Saharsa district in the Indian state of Bihar. The temple of Baba Raghuni Maharaj is situated in this village.

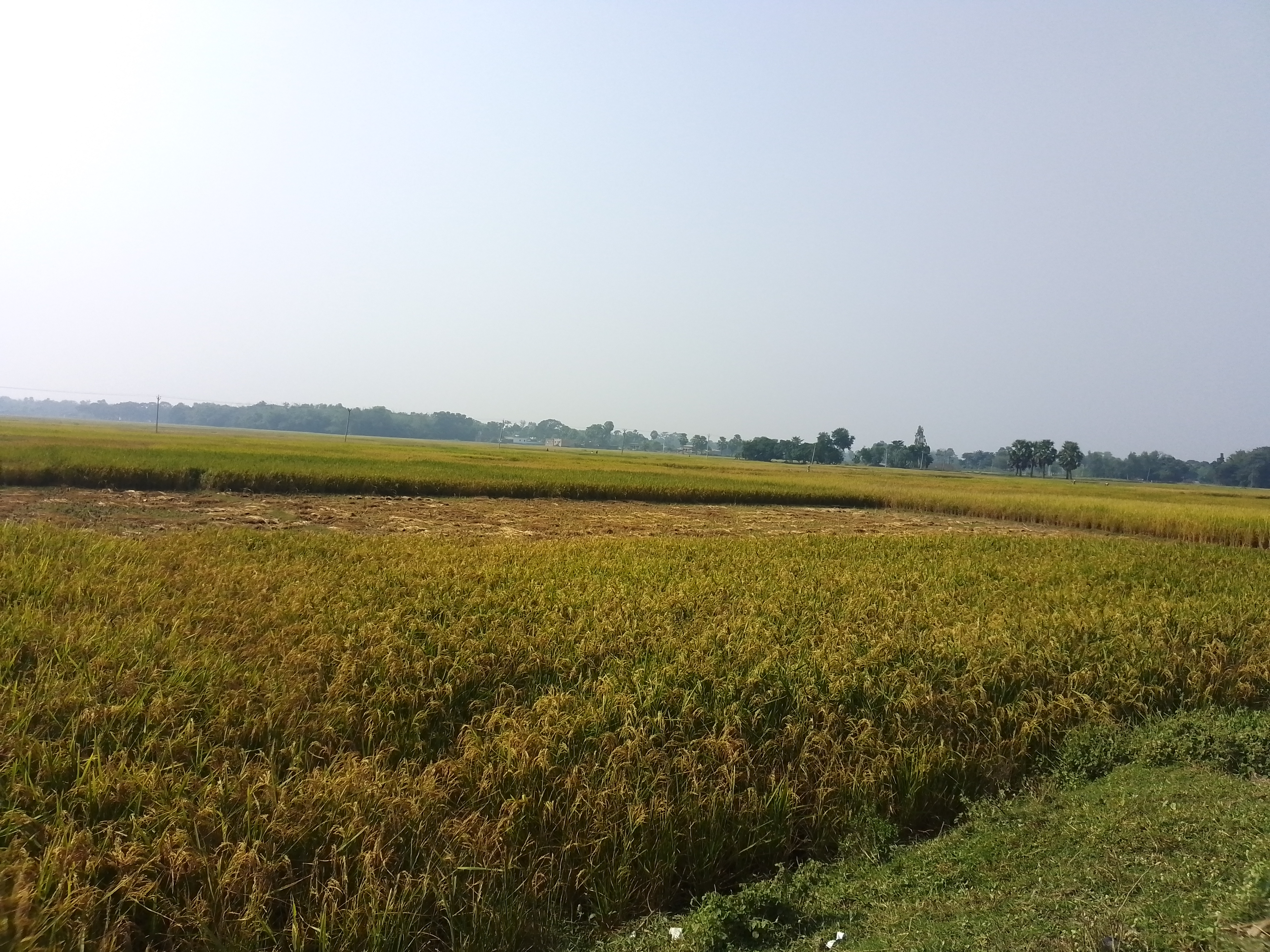
Balutola village rice cultivation in 2024

Balutola is part of Simri Bakhtiyarpur Block and khagaria Loksabha constituency. Some of the neighbouring places include Saharsa(15 km north), Simri, Bhorha (2 km east), Simri Bakhtiyarpur (4 km south) and Balhampur(1 km West). Balutola is come under Raipura Panchayat.

== Geography ==
Balutola is located at coordinates 25.7616972°N 86.5831694°E at an elevation of 45 m above MSL. Pin code of Balutola is 852127, and Ward Number 5.

== Demographics ==
Religion in Balutola
| Religion | Percent |
| Hinduism | 100% |
| Muslim | 0% |
| Other religions | 0% |

Balutola is a village with a population of 409, where Hinduism is the predominant religion practiced by all residents. The entire community belongs to the Kushwaha (Singh) caste, a group traditionally associated with agriculture and rural life. This shared religious and caste identity fosters strong social bonds, creating a cohesive and supportive community. The villagers continue to uphold their cultural heritage, ensuring the preservation of local traditions and a sense of unity that is characteristic of rural India.

== Transportation ==
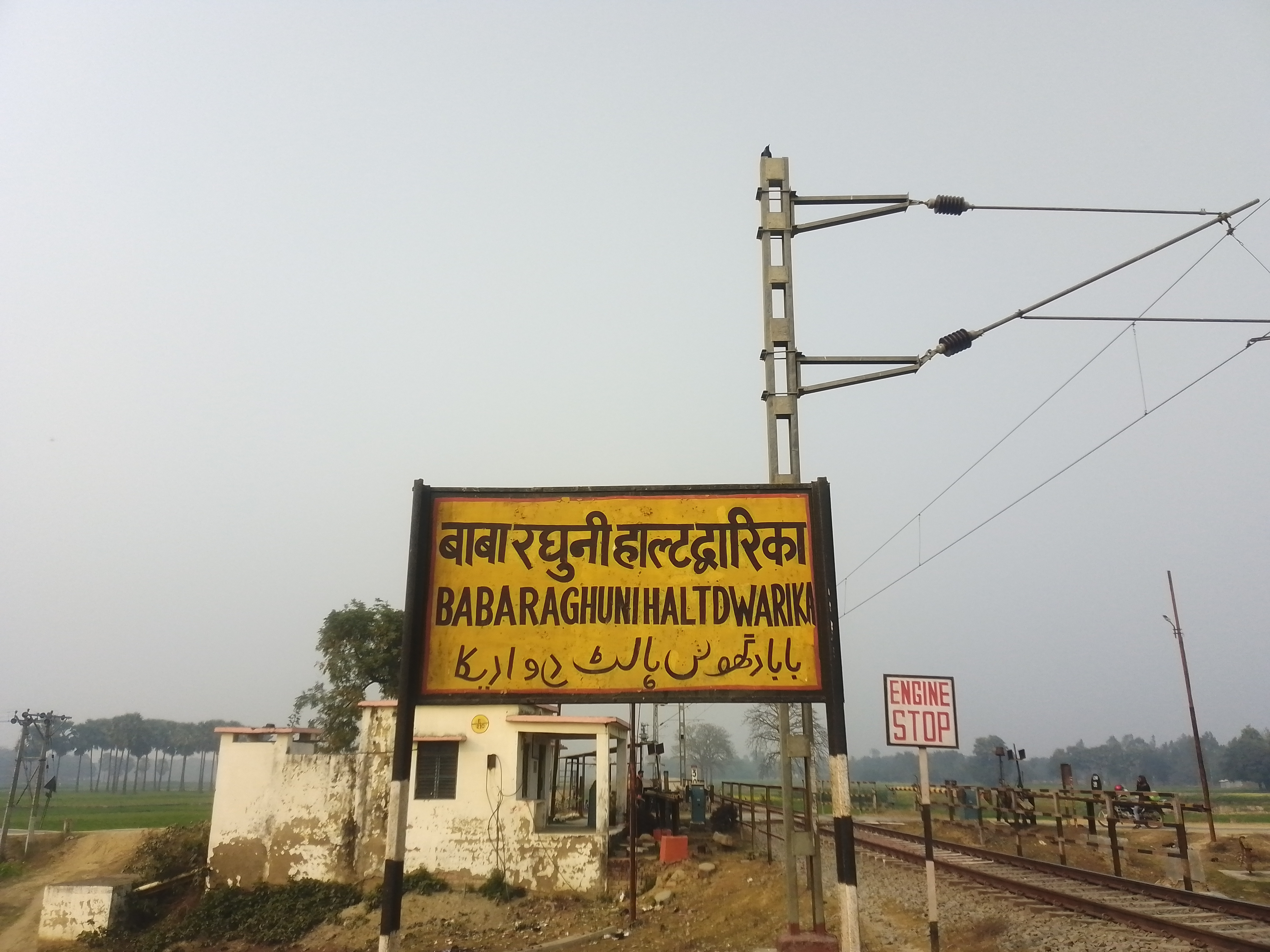
'Baba Raghuni Halt Dwarika' nearest railway station

Balutola is well connected to rail, Road. Nearest railway station is Baba Raghuni Halt Dwarika which is 1.2 km east. National Highway 231 which connects Saharsa, Madhepura, Purnea is passes 1 km west from village.
