= Mukesh Sahani =

Indian politician

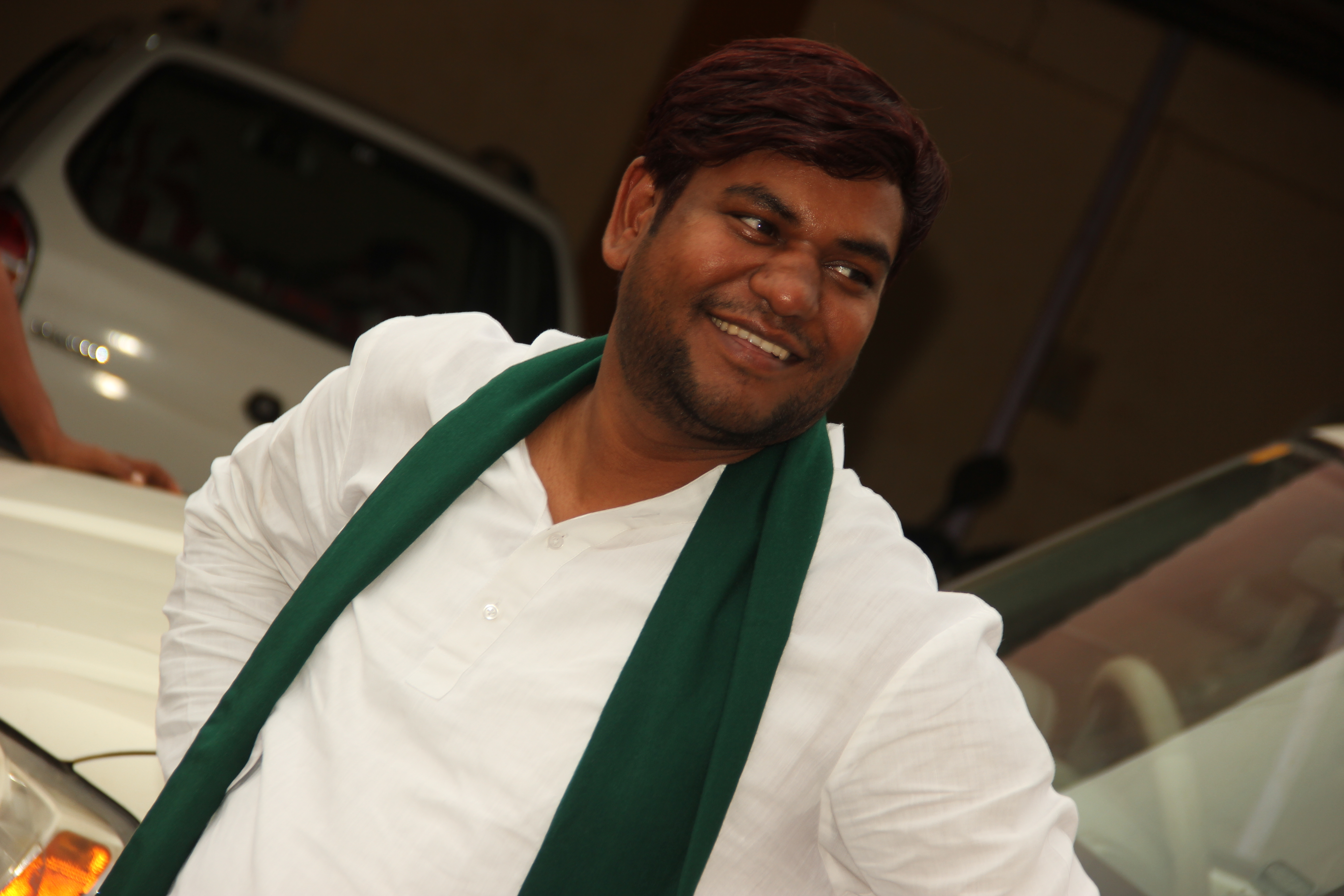
- Sahani in 2021

Cabinet Minister Government of Bihar
- In office 16 November 2020 – 27 March 2022
- Chief Minister: Nitish Kumar
- Ministry & Departments: Animal Husbandry and Fisheries
- Preceded by: Dr. Prem Kumar
- Succeeded by: Md Afaque Alam

Member of Bihar Legislative Council
- In office 21 January 2021 – 21 July 2022
- Preceded by: Vinod Narayan Jha
- Constituency: Bihar

President of Vikassheel Insaan Party
- Incumbent
- Assumed office 4 November 2018
- Preceded by: position established

Personal details
- Born: Mukesh Sahani; 31 March 1981 (age 45) Darbhanga, Bihar, India
- Party: Vikassheel Insaan Party
- Spouse: Kavita Sahani
- Children: Muskan Sahani (daughter); Ranveer Sahani (son)
- Parents: Jitan Sahani (father); Meena Devi (mother)

Mukesh Sahani is an Indian politician from Bihar. He served as the Minister for Animal Husbandry & Fisheries in the Government of Bihar till 27 March 2022 when he was dismissed from the cabinet. He is the founder of the Vikassheel Insaan Party, a political party in Bihar. He previously worked as a Bollywood stage designer. Sahani is also owner of a company named 'Mukesh Cineworld Private Limited'. (Note: The company has created a stage for Devdas)

Sahani campaigned for Bharatiya Janata Party during the 2015 Bihar Legislative Assembly election, but later formed Vikassheel Insaan Party and his party became part of Mahagathbandhan in Bihar for 2019 Indian general election. They contested three Lok Sabha seats but failed to win any seats.

== Early life ==
Mukesh Sahani was born on 31 March 1981 in the Nishad family of Jitan Sahani and Meena devi. He left Bihar at the age of 19 and moved to Mumbai. In his initial times in Mumbai, he worked as a salesman and later joined Bollywood as a set designer. Mukesh is considered as an influential leader of "Mallaah" (fisherman) community, he is also referred to as 'Son of Mallah'.

== Social life ==
In the year 2010, Sahani started thinking about his society and community, he founded Sahani Samaj Kalyan Sanstha in Bihar. He opened two offices, one is in Darbhanga and another one is in Patna. Using this foundation, he has directed people to get well educated and gather in a circle. He was also educated to take interest in politics. In the year 2015, he founded an organisation named Nishad Vikas Sangh. This organisation started working district wise to gather the community people.

== Political career ==
He was observed by Narendra Modi and he picked him up. Sahani started campaigning for the BJP. Finally, BJP won 2014 Lok Sabha Election. However, Sahani left BJP because they did not deliver the promise of approving his community in Schedule Caste category. Later he founded a Sangh named as [Nishad Vikas Sangh] in 2015. In 2018, he formed a party as well with the name of Vikassheel Insaan Party. The party was approved on 26 July 2018. The VIP Party of Sahani contested 2019 General Elections as an alliance in the Mahagathbandhan or the Grand Alliance. It failed to win any seats in the elections. Later in the 2020 Legislative Elections, his party established its place in Bihar by winning four seats. In the Bihar election of 2020, his party fought along with NDA.His party was defeated in 2025 Bihar Legislative Assembly elections winning no seats

== Electoral performance ==
=== Lok Sabha ===
Year	Constituency	Party	Result	Vote	Opposite candidate	Party	Vote
2019	Khagaria	VIP	Lost	27.06%	Mehboob Ali Kaiser	LJP	52.77%

=== Bihar Legislative Assembly ===
Year	Constituency	Party	Result	Vote	Opposite candidate	Party	Vote
2020	Simri Bakhtiarpur	VIP	Lost	37.81%	Yusuf Salahuddin	RJD	38.48%
