= Parvati Devi (disambiguation) =

Parvati is a Hindu goddess.

Parvati Devi may also refer to:

- Parvati Devi (Bihar politician)
- Parvati Devi (Ladakh politician)
