= Balhampur =

Village in Bihar, India

- Village
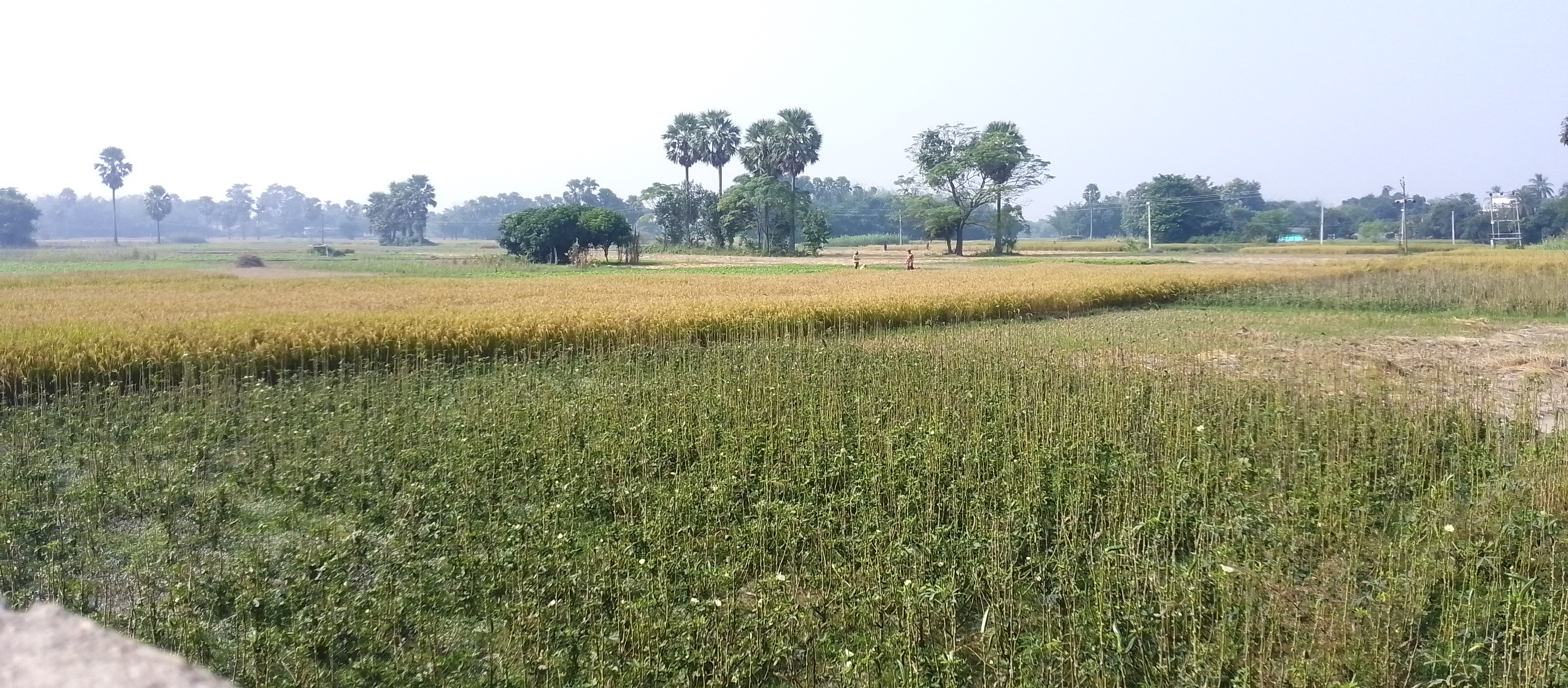
- Ladyfinger(Bhindi) ki kheti

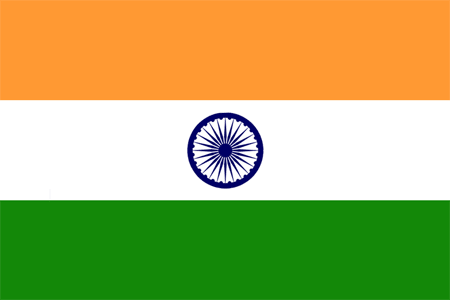
- Flag

- Location in Bihar, India Balhampur (India)
- Coordinates: 25.7662°N 86.5741°E
- Country: India
- State: Bihar
- Region: Mithila
- District: Saharsa

Government
  - Type: Bihar Government
  - Body: Mukhiya
  - Mukhiya: Mati Sabujiya Devi
- Elevation: 45 m (148 ft)

Population
  - Total: 3,803

Languages
  - Official: Hindi
  - Additional official: Urdu
  - Regional: Maithili
- Time zone: UTC+5:30 (IST)
- PIN: 852127
- Vehicle registration: BR 19

Balhampur (Hindi: [bəlʱɑːmpʊr]) is a village in the southern part of Saharsa district, Bihar. It lies in the Simri Bakhtiyarpur Block and Khagaria Assembly constituency at an elevation of 45 meters above MSL.Kosi River which flows 3 km west from Village.

The village is bordered by Simri Bakhtiyarpur (5 km South), Mahkhar, and Bhorha (2 km east), with Saharsa located 15 km to the north. Balhampur's economy is largely agricultural. The people of Balhampur celebrate Chhath Puja. Key landmarks near Balhampur include the State Bank of India branch in Simri Bakhtiyarpur, located 5 km to the north. National Highway 231 passes nearby, connecting the village to other significant locations in the region. Balhampur is governed locally by the Mukhiya, Sabujiya Devi, who oversees the village's administration and development.

== Demographics ==
Religion in Balhampur
Religion	Percent
Hinduism	92.0%
Muslim	6.9%
Other religions	1.1%
*Includes other minority religions

Balhampur spans 264 hectares with a population of 3,803 people, including 1,992 males and 1,811 females. The village has a literacy rate of 42.44%, with 72.76% male and 27.24% female literacy. The majority of the population 92% practices Hinduism, followed by 6.9% Muslims, and 1.1% belong to other religions. The fertility rate in Balhampur is 2. There are approximately 722 households in the village. Maithili is the most spoken regional language. Hindi is the official language, while Urdu is additional official.

== Transportation ==
Balhampur's nearest railway station is Baba Raghuni Halt Dwarika which is 3 km east, Darbhanga Airport 101 km and National Highway 231.

== See also ==
- List of villages in Saharsa district
- Barsam, Bihar
- Baghwa
- Balutola
