= Mewalal Chaudhary =

Indian politician (1953–2021)

- Mewa Lal Chaudhary

Minister of Education Government of Bihar
- In office 16 November 2020 – 19 November 2020
- Preceded by: Krishna Nandan Prasad Verma; Janata Dal (United)
- Succeeded by: Vijay Kumar Chaudhary

Member of the Bihar Legislative Assembly
- In office November 2015 – 19 April 2021
- Constituency: Tarapur
- Preceded by: Neeta Choudhary
- Succeeded by: Rajeev Kumar Singh

Personal details
- Born: 4 January 1953 Munger district, Bihar
- Died: 19 April 2021 (aged 68) Paras Hospital, Patna
- Party: Janata Dal (United)
- Spouse: Neeta Choudhary
- Education: Master of Science in Agriculture; PHD
- Profession: Agriculturist, Vice Chancellor of Bihar Agricultural University

Mewalal Chaudhary (4 January 1953 – 19 April 2021) was a leader of Janata Dal (United) and a minister for a brief period of time in the Nitish Kumar's cabinet. He was elected from the Tarapur assembly constituency to the Bihar Legislative Assembly in 2020, and was made a minister in charge of Education in the Bihar Government. However, he had to resign just three days after his appointment, amidst row over his alleged involvement in a corruption case, for which he was booked earlier. Chaudhary was an educationist, and prior to becoming a legislator, he was serving as Vice Chancellor of various agricultural universities in Bihar.

== Biography ==
Born on 4 January 1953 to Deep Narayan Chaudhary in Munger district, Choudhary was Master of Science in Agriculture. He belonged to Kushwaha community. He was married to Neetu Chaudhary, who was a JD(U) MLA. Neetu however died in an accident caused by gas cylinder blast at her residence. He entered active politics in 2010 and remained successful in getting elected to Bihar Legislative Assembly in the year 2015 on the ticket of Janata Dal (United). He defeated Shakuni Choudhury of Hindustani Awam Morcha in that election.

He served as vice chancellor of Rajendra Agricultural University, Pusa, Samastipur and Bihar Agricultural University, Sabaur. Chaudhary was also one of the member of the Committee, which drafted Bihar Agricultural roadmap. Serving as the horticultural commissioner of the Government of India, he assisted in development of the draft horticulture mission, micro irrigation project as well as National Bamboo Mission. He has also worked for the upliftment of downtrodden.

Chaudhary was allegedly involved in mismanagement of appointments to Bihar Agricultural University on the post of junior scientists and Professors while he was its head in 2017. Consequently, he was sacked by the ruling JD (U), which was ruling in alliance with the Rashtriya Janata Dal with its former ally Bharatiya Janata Party in opposition. In the same year he was granted anticipatory bail in the said case and was taken back in the party in 2018.

Chaudhary once again won from the Tarapur seat and was appointed education minister in the Nitish Kumar cabinet in 2020. His appointment was questioned by the opposition; meanwhile serious allegations were also made against him, regarding death of his wife, by an Indian Police Service officer, who linked it to political conspiracy pertaining to the Bihar Agricultural University 2017 scam. On 19 November 2020, just three days after assuming the office of education minister, he resigned amidst protest by the opposition regarding giving the ministerial berth to an accused of corruption. He was allegedly involved in fraudulent appointment to the post of agricultural scientist and junior professor during his tenure as vice chancellor of Bihar Agricultural University.

== Death ==
Chaudhary died on 19 April 2021 due to COVID-19 at Paras hospital in Patna, Bihar.
