= Simri Bakhtiyarpur =

Town in Bihar

- Town
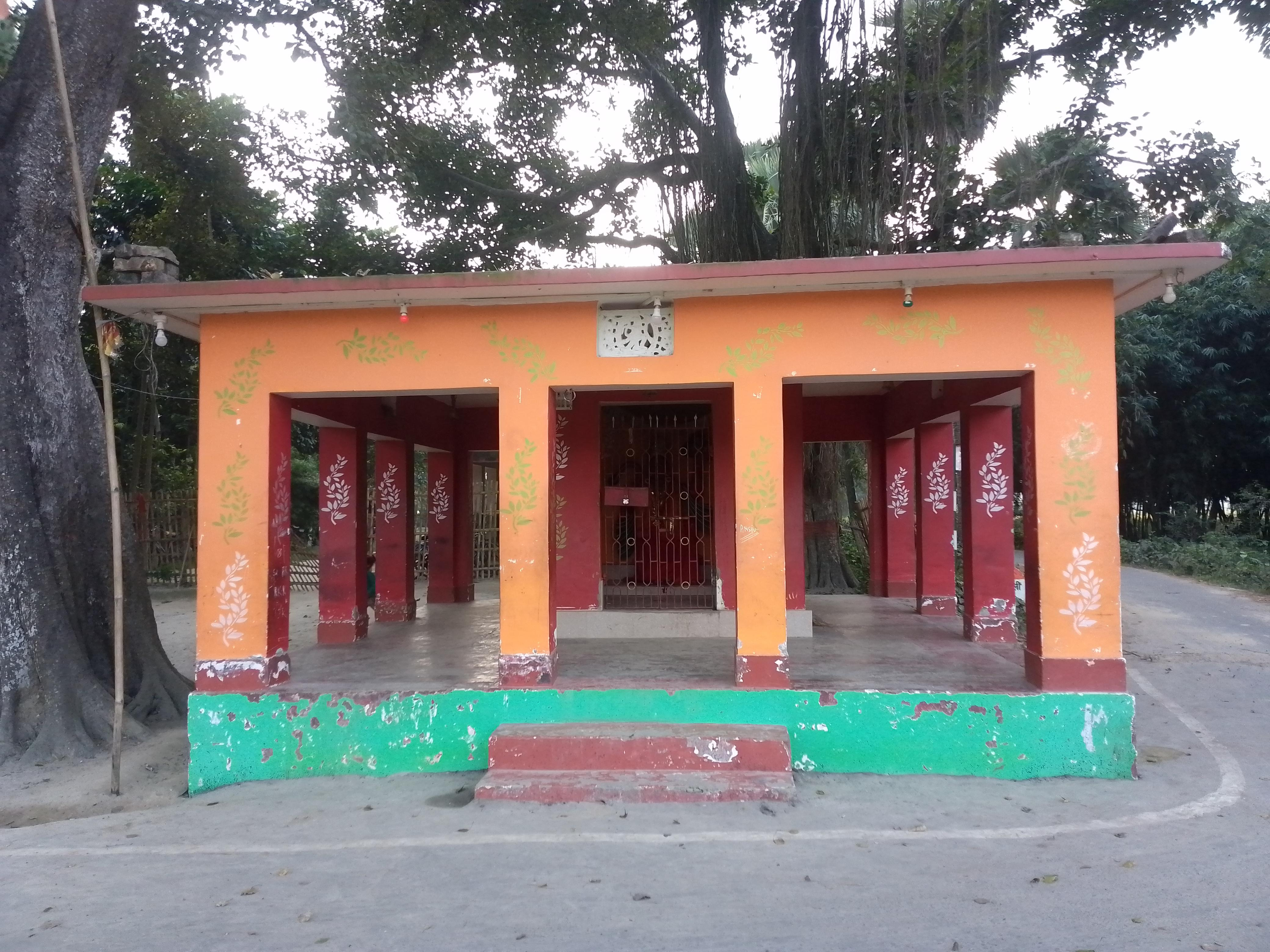

- Location in Bihar, India
- Coordinates: 25.88°N 86.6°E
- Country: India
- State: Bihar
- Region: Mithila
- District: Saharsa
- Elevation: 31 m (102 ft)

Population (2011)
  - Total: 280,582

Languages
  - Official: Hindi
  - Regional: Maithili
- Time zone: UTC+5:30 (IST)
- PIN: 852127
- Vehicle registration: BR-19
- Major highway: NH 231
- Vidhan Sabha constituency: Simri Bakhtiarpur Assembly constituency

Simri Bakhtiyarpur (/ˈsɪmribɑːkˈtiːjɑːrpʊr/; ISO: Simrī Bakhtiyārpur; Hindi: [sɪmri bəkʰt̪ijaːrpʊr]; abbr. SB Pur) is a town in the Saharsa district of Bihar, India. It lies to the south of Saharsa town and serves as the headquarters of the Simri Bakhtiyarpur subdivision. The town is located at 25°43′0″N 86°35′0″E and has an average elevation of 31 metres above mean sea level.

== Economy ==
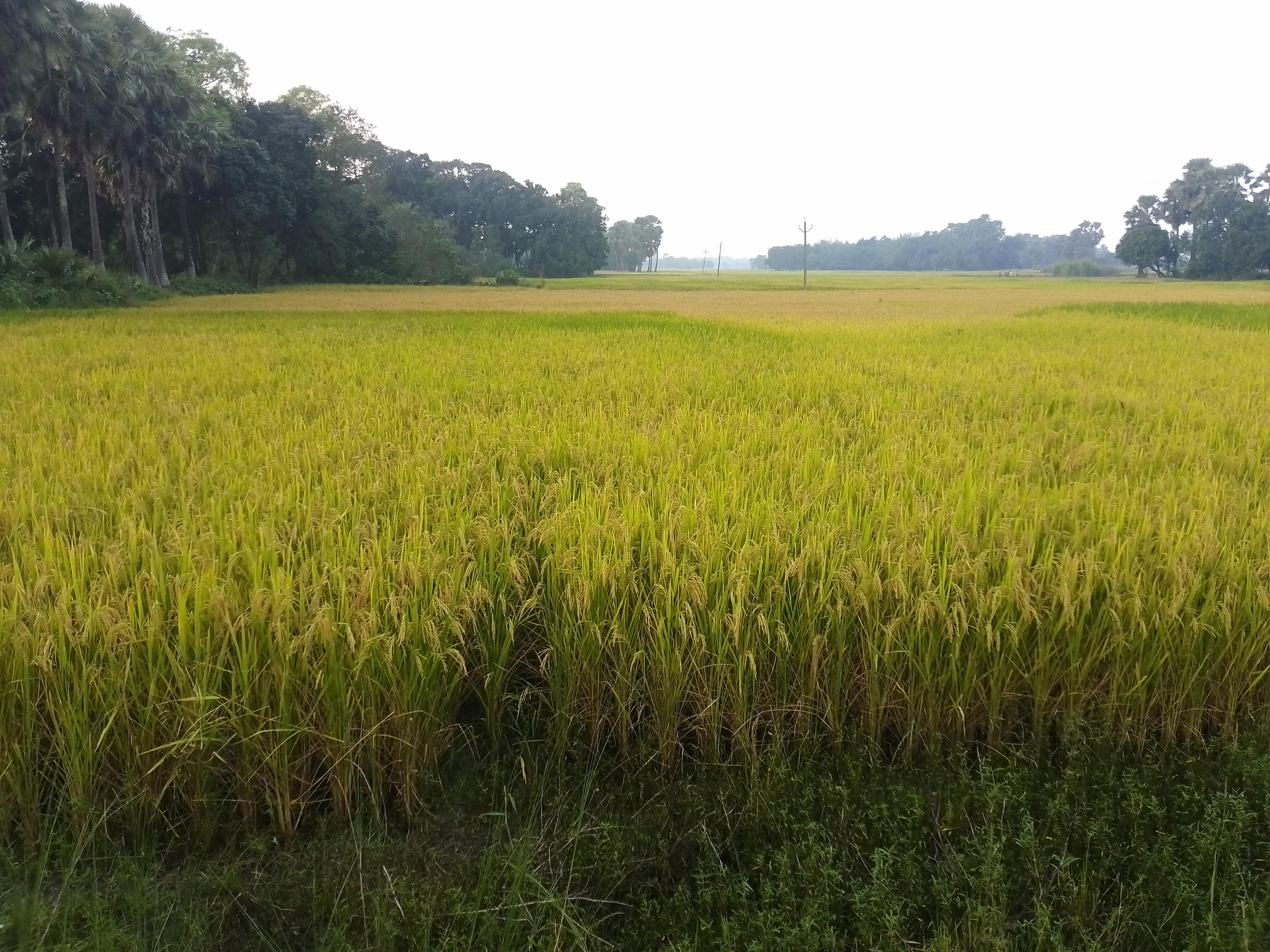
Balutola Village Near Simri Bakhtiyarpur Rice Cultivation

The economy of Simri-Bakhtiyarpur is primarily agricultural, with Makhana farming playing a key role due to its growing demand in domestic and international markets. This contributes significantly to local income and employment. Additionally, small-scale factories in the region support the economy by processing agricultural products, creating further job opportunities and adding value to local produce.

== Transport ==
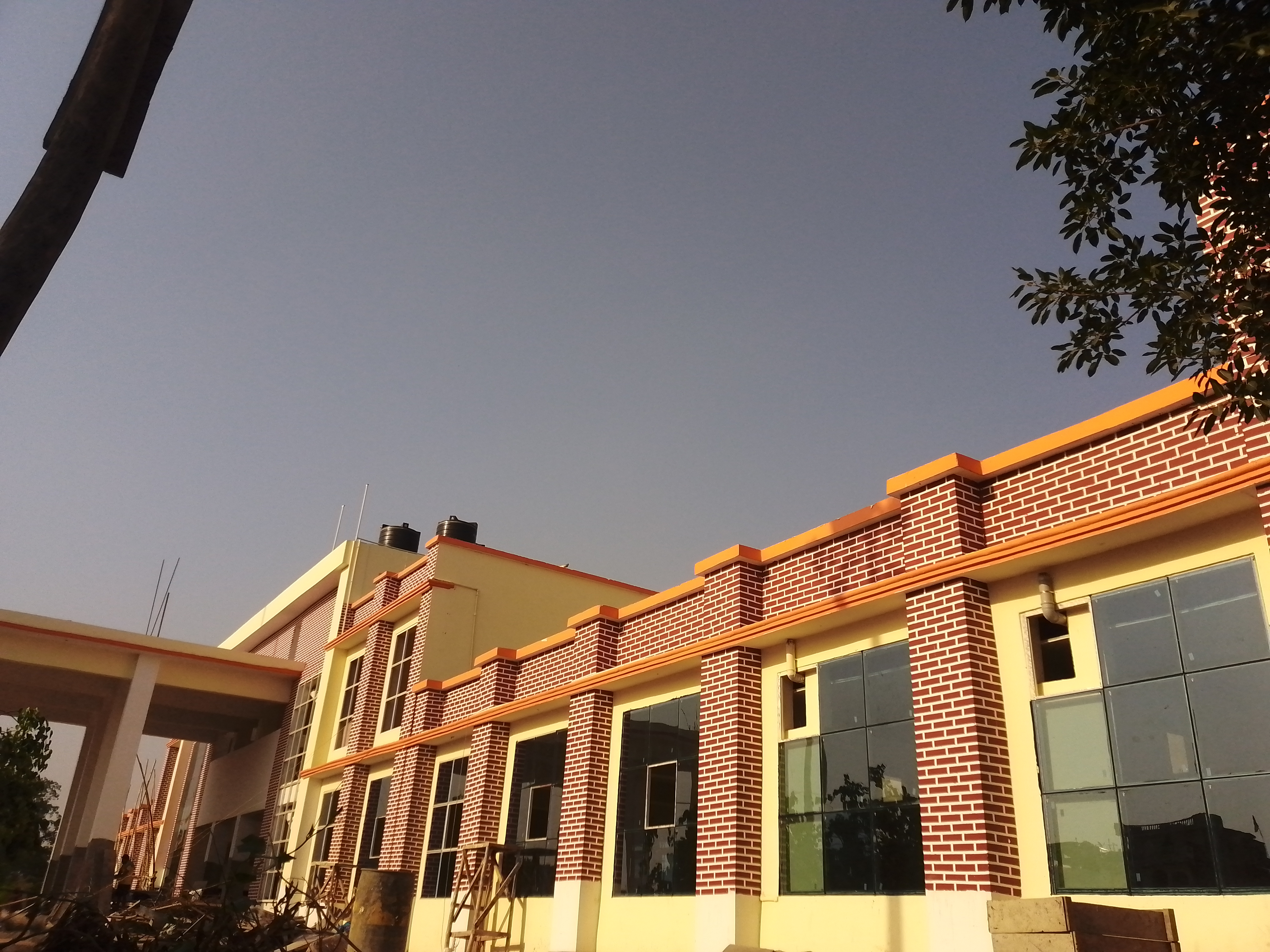
Simri Bakhtiyarpur railway station

The National Highway 231 passes through the town, providing direct access to major cities in Bihar and neighboring states. The Simri Bakhtiyarpur Railway Station further enhances connectivity, linking the region to key destinations across India. These transport networks contribute significantly to the movement of goods and people, supporting both local commerce and tourism.

== College ==
- DC College Simri Bakhtiyarpur
- +2 High School Simri Bakhtiyarpur
- Project Girl School Simri Bakhtiyarpur

== Notable people ==
- Mehboob Ali Kaiser, politician
- Dinesh Chandra Yadav (Indian politician), Member of the Lok Sabha
- Yusuf Salahuddin, Politician
- Zafar Alam (Bihar politician), Bihar Politician
