= Simri Bakhtiyarpur subdivision =

Administrative subdivision in Saharsa district, Bihar, India

- Subdivision
- Location in Bihar, India Simri Bakhtiyarpur subdivision (India)
- Coordinates: 25.7237810°N 86.5800323°E
- Country: India
- State: Bihar
- District: Saharsa

Population (2011)
  - Total: 280,582

Languages
  - Official: Hindi
- Time zone: UTC+05:30 (IST)
- PIN: 852127
- Vehicle registration: BR-19

Simri Bakhtiyarpur subdivision is an administrative subdivision in the Saharsa district of the Indian state of Bihar. Its administrative headquarters is the town of Simri Bakhtiyarpur.

== Geography ==
Simri Bakhtiyarpur subdivision lies in the alluvial Kosi river basin of north Bihar and forms part of the cultural region of Mithila. The subdivision is located at 25.7237810°N 86.5800323°E. The terrain is predominantly flat and subject to seasonal flooding from the Kosi and its tributaries.

== Administration ==
Simri Bakhtiyarpur is one of two civil subdivisions of Saharsa district. The subdivision comprises three community development blocks (CD blocks):

- Simri Bakhtiyarpur
- Salkhua
- Banma Itahri

Block-level administration is carried out by the respective Block Development Offices (BDOs) under the District Administration of Saharsa.

== Demographics ==
According to the 2011 Census of India (Primary Census Abstract and District Census Handbook):

- Total population (2011): 280,582
- Male population (2011): 147,626
- Female population (2011): 132,956
- Sex ratio (females per 1,000 males): 901
- Overall literacy rate (2011): 48.80% (Simri Bakhtiyarpur CD block). Detailed tables showing male and female literacy rates and village/town-wise literate counts are provided in the District Census Handbook, Saharsa (Part B: Census Tables).

== Economy ==
The economy of the subdivision is predominantly agrarian. Local cropping and agri-processing are the main occupations in the CD blocks.

== Transport ==
Simri Bakhtiyarpur is served by local roads connecting the subdivision to the Saharsa district headquarters and the wider road network of Bihar. Simri Bakhtiyarpur railway station serves passenger rail needs for the subdivision’s headquarters and nearby villages.

== Education and public services ==
Government primary and secondary schools, anganwadis, public health centres and administrative offices for the blocks are listed on the official Saharsa district pages.

== See also ==
- Saharsa district
- Mithila (region)
- Simri Bakhtiyarpur
