= Zafar Alam =

Zafar Alam may refer to:

- Zafar Alam (Uttar Pradesh politician) (born 1944)
- Zafar Alam (Bihar politician)
