= Devesh Kumar =

Indian politician

Member of Bihar Legislative Council
- In office 17 March 2021 – 30 July 2026
- Constituency: Nominated

General Secretary of Bharatiya Janata Party – Bihar
- In office 20 March 2020 – 24 March 2023
- President: Sanjay Jaiswal

Personal details
- Born: 30 August 1964 (age 61)
- Party: Bharatiya Janata Party
- Parent: Mahesh Kumar (father)
- Relatives: Yamuna Karjee (grandfather)
- Education: M.A., M.Phil
- Profession: Politician

Devesh Kumar is an Indian politician and a former member of the Bihar Legislative Council from the Bharatiya Janata Party. He has also held a leadership/organizational role within the Bihar BJP as a state general secretary, involved in party communications and strategy.
