= Rajesh Verma (Khagaria politician) =

Indian politician (born 1992)

Member of Parliament, Lok Sabha
- Incumbent
- Assumed office 4 June 2024
- Preceded by: Mehboob Ali Kaiser
- Constituency: Khagaria Lok Sabha constituency, Bihar

District President of Lok Janshakti Party Bhagalpur
- Incumbent
- Assumed office March 2022

Personal details
- Born: 25 August 1992 (age 34)
- Party: Lok Janshakti Party (Ram Vilas) (2020–present)
- Education: SISTec
- Occupation: Politician, Businessman

Rajesh Verma (born 15 August 1992) is an Indian politician, businessman, former Deputy Mayor of Bhagalpur Municipal Corporation and member of Lok Janshakti Party (Ram Vilas). He has been elected as Member of Parliament from Khagaria Lok Sabha constituency Bihar in 18th Lok Sabha election. He joined Lok Janshakti (Ram Vilas) in July 2020.

== Early life and education ==
Verma belongs to Swarnkar/Sonar family whose roots lie in Ajmer, Bhagalpur, Bihar.

He has completed his studies in engineering from Sagar Institute of Science and Technology (Bhopal) in the year of 2014. Verma is a businessman and owns a real estate company.

== Political career ==
He has contested from Bhagalpur Assembly constituency in 2020 Bihar Legislative Assembly election. He has also served as deputy mayor in Bhagalpur from June 2017 to December 2022.

He designated as LJP(RV) district president from Bhagalpur in March 2022.

He won in 2024 Lok Sabha election by the margin of 1,61,131 votes and defeated CPI(M)'s politician Sanjay Kumar Kushwaha.

== See also ==
- Khagaria Lok Sabha constituency
- 2024 Indian general election
- List of members of the 18th Lok Sabha
- Lok Janshakti Party (Ram Vilas)
