= Salkhua =

- Block
- Location within Bihar Location within India
- Coordinates: 25°40′07″N 86°35′52″E
- Country: India
- State: Bihar
- Region: Mithila
- District: Saharsa
- Villages: 43

Area
  - Total: 157 km^{2} (61 sq mi)

Population (2011)
  - Total: 132,844
  - Density: 846/km^{2} (2,190/sq mi)
- Time zone: UTC+5:30 (IST)
- PIN: 852126

Salkhua is a block in Saharsa District, Kosi Division, Bihar, India. It is a rural district, with its seat being in the village of Salkhua. The main language spoken in this block is the Thethi dialect of Maithili and the majority religion being practiced is Hinduism, though there is also a small Muslim minority. The block is split by the Kosi River.

It is part of the Simri Bakhtiarpur Constituency.

Religion in Salkhua
Religion	Percent
Hinduism	92.12%
Islam	7.67%
Others*	0.20%
*Includes Christians, Sikhs, Buddhists, Jains, Atheists, and Agnostics

== Administrative Divisions ==
As of 2011, there are 43 villages in Salkhua. They are:

- Alani
- Baldehi
- Banganwan
- Bankatti
- Basahi
- Bhelwa
- Bhirkhi
- Chanan
- Chhachhua
- Chiraia
- Gaurdah
- Goriyari
- Gauri
- Gauspur
- Gurganwan
- Harinsari
- Harewa
- Kabira
- Kabirpur
- Kamra
- Kathghara
- Khajur bana
- Khochardewa
- Khograha
- Koparia
- Kotwalia
- Kuchaut
- Mamarkha
- Mangaltola
- Phensaha
- Puraini
- Raingnian
- Sahoria
- Sahsaili Thuthi
- Sahuria
- Salkhua
- Samhar Kalan
- Samhar Khurd
- Sauthi
- Shahganwan
- Situahi
- Tajpur
- Utesra

== See also ==
- Simri Bakhtiyarpur
- Simri Bakhtiarpur Constituency
- Sonbarsa Constituency
- Saharsa District
- Mithila
- Bihar
