= Yamuna Karjee =

Indian activist (1898–1953)

Yamuna Karjee (1898-1953) was an Indian independence activist.

== Biography ==
=== Early life and education ===
Yamuna Karjee was born in a BhumiharBrahmin family. He belongs to Deopar near Pusa in Samastipur District of Bihar in 1900. His father Anu Karjee was a farmer who died when Yamuna Karjee was just 6 months old. From his school days itself, he was drawn towards India’s freedom struggle and the Kisan Movement and Peasant movement under Sahajanand Saraswati's leadership. In the peasant movement he became a close associate of other revolutionary peasant leaders like Karyanand Sharma, Yadunandan Sharma and Panchanan Sharma.

For higher studies he went to the Presidency College, Kolkata, and also obtained a degree in Law. In Calcutta he came in contact with several freedom fighters and Congress leaders like Bidhan Chandra Roy, Sri Krishna Sinha and Rahul Sankrityayan.

=== Career ===
Spurning the offers of several government jobs, he became a Hindi journalist of repute. He joined the editorial wing of Hindi weekly Bharat Mitra published in Calcutta. He also took part in Gandhiji’s non cooperation movement from 1920–21 and was jailed in 1929-30 for taking part in civil disobedience movement and Namak Satyagrah.

He won the first election for Bihar and Orissa Assembly in 1937 as a Congress candidate.

He along with Rahul Sankrityayan, Ramdhari Singh Dinkar and other popular Hindi authors and academics started publishing a Hindi weekly named Hunkar from Bihar in 1940. He worked with many Bhumihar (Babhan) leaders and severed as President of Kishan sabhan too. His work was guided by his respected Gandhian friend and relative Bashishtha Narayan Sharma, a Graduate from Presidency College Calcutta who refused to join Bihar Provincial Services, popularly known as Guruji (Master Saheb). Hunkar later became the mouthpiece of the peasant movement and the agrarian movement in Bihar. Yamuna Karjee was also the President of the Kisan Sabha for some time. (For role of Pandit Yamuna Karjee in Peasant movement please also see Chapter 5: The Making of Kisan as a Class - Shodhganga - shodhganga.inflibnet.ac.in/bitstream/10603/14428/10/10_chapter%205.pdf)

=== Death and afterward ===
He died of cancer in October 1953, aged 53. at an early age of 53. After his demise, the peasant movement lost momentum in Bihar and became rudderless.

There is a college near Muzaffarpur named after Yamuna Karjee.

== See also ==
- Prabhu Narayan
