= Satish Prasad Singh =

Indian politician (1936–2020)

6th Chief Minister of Bihar
- In office 28 January 1968 – 1 February 1968
- Preceded by: Mahamaya Prasad Sinha
- Succeeded by: B. P. Mandal

Member of Parliament, Lok Sabha
- In office 1980–1984
- Preceded by: Gyaneshwar Prasad Yadav
- Succeeded by: Chandra Shekhar Prasad Verma
- Constituency: Khagaria, Bihar

Member of Legislative assembly of Bihar
- In office 1958–1968

Personal details
- Born: 1 January 1936 Anandpur Village, Khagaria, Bihar, British India
- Died: 2 November 2020 (aged 84) Saket, Delhi, India
- Cause of death: COVID-19
- Party: Indian National Congress
- Other political affiliations: Bhartiya Janata Party

Satish Prasad Singh (1 January 1936 – 2 November 2020) was an Indian politician. He was the Chief Minister of Bihar for a very brief tenure of just four days in 1968.

== Biography ==
He was a member of saraiya community and his daughter Suchitra Singh is married to Nagmani, son of Jagdeo Prasad who was popularly known as "Lenin of Bihar". Singh headed a coalition government led by Soshit Samaj Dal and supported by the Indian National Congress. He was elected to the 7th Lok Sabha (the lower house of the Parliament of India) from the Khagaria constituency of Bihar in 1980 as a member of the Congress Party. He was the first Chief Minister of Bihar who belonged to the other backward classes.

Singh joined the Indian National Congress in 1980 and was elected to the Lok Sabha in his very first attempt. He later joined the Bhartiya Janata Party in September 2013 but later quit the party after protesting against the poor representation of Kushwahas in the assembly tickets distribution.

Singh hailed from a prosperous family and owned more than 50 acre land. He married Gyan Kala, who belonged to another caste. The inter-caste marriage being difficult in those days, they had to defy their parents in order to marry each other.

== Death ==
Singh died in Delhi from complications of COVID-19 on 2 November 2020, 5 days after his wife died from the same disease.

Lok Sabha
Preceded by Gyaneshwar Prasad Yadav	Member of Parliament for Khagaria; 1980–1984	Succeeded by Chandra Shekhar Prasad Verma
Political offices
Preceded by Mahamaya Prasad Sinha	Chief minister of Bihar; 28 January 1968 – 1 February 1968	Succeeded by B. P. Mandal
