= Parvati Devi (Bihar politician) =

Indian politician

Parvati Devi was an Indian politician based in Bihar. She was a member of Bihar Legislative Assembly from Tarapur Assembly constituency in Munger district of Bihar. Devi belonged to political family of Shakuni Choudhary. Chaudhary was a seven times Member of Bihar Legislative Assembly and a former member of Indian Parliament (Lok Sabha) from Khagaria Lok Sabha constituency. She was a social activist besides being a politician and is known for her social activities in the Munger district of Bihar. Her children include Samrat Choudhary, the current Chief Minister of Bihar.
