= Kameshwar Prasad Singh =

Former member of Indian parliament, Lok Sabha

Member of the Indian Parliament, Lok Sabha
- In office 1967–1970
- Preceded by: Jiyalal Mandal
- Succeeded by: Shiva Shankar Prasad Yadav
- Constituency: Khagaria Lok Sabha constituency

Personal details
- Party: Samyukta Socialist Party

Kameshwar Prasad Singh was an Indian politician and a member of Indian parliament.

== Career ==
He was elected to lower house of Parliament of India, Lok Sabha from Khagaria Lok Sabha constituency of Bihar. He was a member of Samyukta Socialist Party. Singh was a member of Kushwaha caste, which is second most numerous caste group in the Khagaria constituency after Yadavs. He was one of the five parliamentarians of the Kushwaha caste, who were elected from this parliamentary constituency between 1957 and 2014. He became a member of 4th Lok Sabha by winning the general election of 1967. In this election, he defeated Jiyalal Mandal, who was two term winner from the constituency.
