= Anil Kumar Yadav (politician, born 1956) =

Indian politician (born 1956)

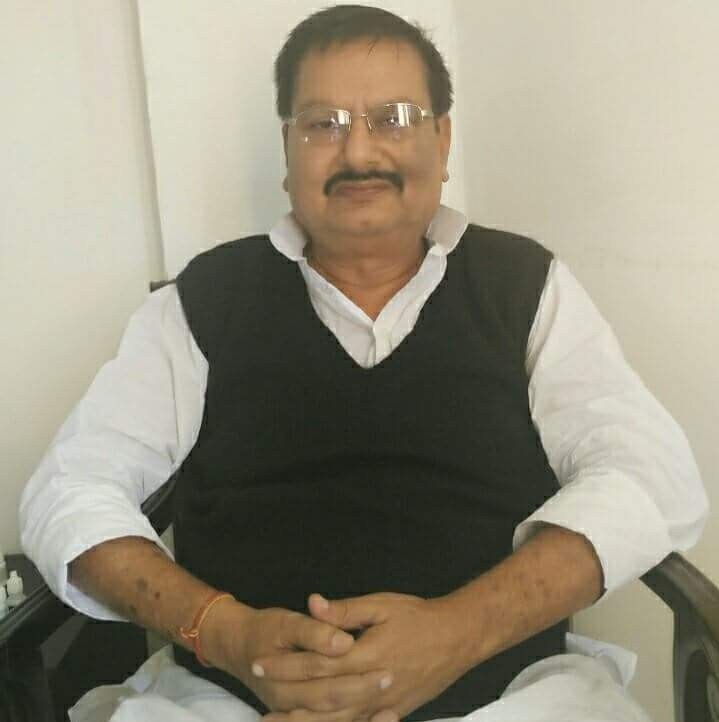
- Anil Kumar Yadav

Member of Parliament, Lok Sabha
- In office 1996-98
- Preceded by: Ram Sharan Yadav
- Succeeded by: Shakuni Choudhury
- Constituency: Khagaria, Bihar

Personal details
- Born: 2 July 1956 (age 69) Tintanga Karari, Bhagalpur District, Bihar
- Party: Janata Dal
- Spouse: Baby Kumari

Anil Kumar Yadav (born 2 July 1956) is an Indian politician. He was elected to the Lok Sabha, lower house of the Parliament of India from Khagaria, Bihar as member of the Janata Dal.
