= Tarapur Assembly constituency =

Legislative Assembly seat in Bihar

- Constituency No. - for the Bihar Legislative Assembly

Constituency details
- Country: India
- Region: East India
- State: Bihar
- District: Munger
- Lok Sabha constituency: Jamui
- Established: 1951
- Total electors: 331,313
- Reservation: None

Member of Legislative Assembly
- 18th Bihar Legislative Assembly
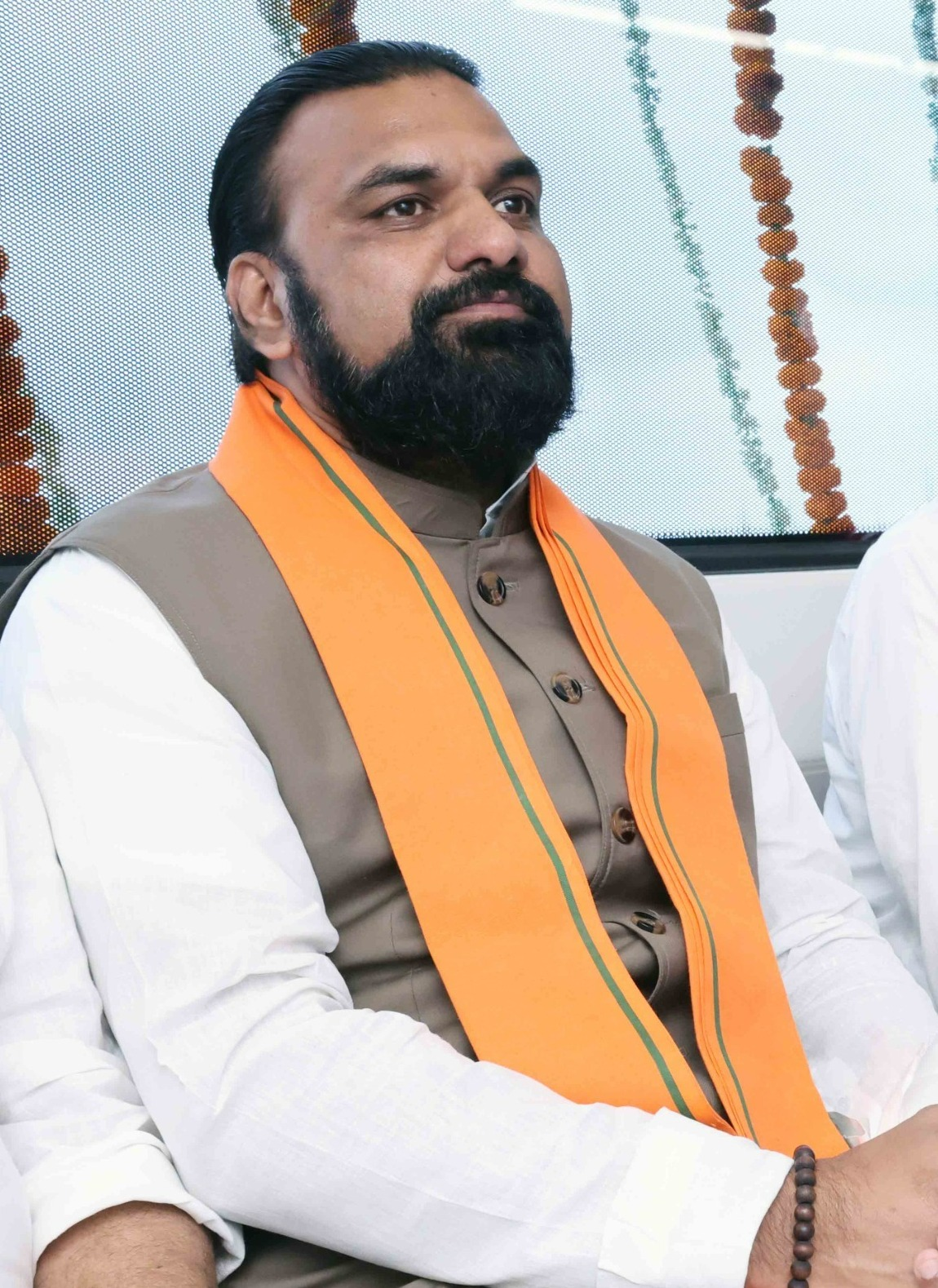
- Incumbent Samrat Choudhary; Chief Minister of Bihar
- Party: BJP
- Alliance: NDA
- Elected year: 2025

Tarapur is one of 243 constituencies of the legislative assembly of Bihar. It comes under Jamui (Lok Sabha constituency). This assembly constituency contains Tarapur Block. The region is dominated by Kushwahas. In the elections of Mukhiya and the President (Pramukh) of the Block, the probability of the victory of candidates belonging to this caste group remains high. In 2022, the polls were conducted for the membership of Zila Parishad and Mukhiya, and out of ten posts of Mukhia, five were won by the candidate belonging to Kushwaha community. The two posts of member of Zila Parishad also went to candidates from the same community.

== Overview ==
Tarapur comprises CD Blocks Asarganj, Tarapur, Tetiha Bamber & Sangrampur; Gram Panchayats Ramankabad (West), Ramankabad (East), Majhgyan, Murade, Gangata, Dariyapur-1 & 2 & Kharagpur (NA) of Kharagpur CD Block.

The constituency is dominated by the backward castes and in this constituency, the candidates belonging to Kushwaha caste has been winning consecutively for decades. Veteran politician Shakuni Choudhary was elected from this constituency for six times. He won as an independent candidate for the first time in 1985, and in his last election in 2010, he was defeated by Neeta Chaudhary of Janata Dal (United). Even before Shakuni Chaudhary, Tarini Prasad Singh, who also belonged to Kushwaha caste, was elected from this constituency twice. In 2015, Mewalal Chaudhary, husband of former legislator Neeta Chaudhary contested against Shakuni Chaudhary, who was a candidate of Hindustani Awam Morcha then. Latter was defeated and Mewalal was victorious in 2015 elections. Mewalal Chaudhary was re-elected in 2020 Assembly elections and following his death in 2021, a bypoll was conducted in the constituency in the year 2021. In this bypoll, Rajiv Kumar Singh was declared winner. In 2025, the incumbent Chief Minister of Bihar, Samrat Choudhary contested from this seat as a Bharatiya Janata Party candidate and won.

== Members of Legislative Assembly ==
Election	Name	Party
1952	Basukinath Rai	Indian National Congress
1957	Basukinath Rai	Indian National Congress
1962	Jaimangal Singh	Indian National Congress
1967	B. N. Parsant	Samyukta Socialist Party
1969	Tarini Prasad Singh	Shoshit Dal
1972	Tarini Prasad Singh	Indian National Congress
1977	Kaushalaya Devi	Janata Party
1980	Narayan Yadav	Communist Party of India
1985	Shakuni Choudhury	Independent
1990	Shakuni Choudhury	Indian National Congress
1995	Shakuni Choudhury	Samata Party
1998^	Parvati Devi	Samata Party
2000	Shakuni Choudhury	Rashtriya Janata Dal
2005-Feb	Shakuni Choudhury	Rashtriya Janata Dal
2005-Oct	Shakuni Choudhury	Rashtriya Janata Dal
2010	Neeta Choudhary	Janata Dal (United)
2015	Mewalal Chaudhary	Janata Dal (United)
2020	Mewalal Chaudhary	Janata Dal (United)
2021^	Rajeev Kumar Singh	Janata Dal (United)
2025	Samrat Choudhary	Bharatiya Janata Party

^by-election

== Election results ==
=== 2025 ===
2025 Bihar Legislative Assembly election: Tarapur Assembly constituency
Party	Candidate	Votes	%	±%
BJP	Samrat Choudhary	122,480	56.77	New entry
RJD	Arun Kumar Sah	76,637	35.52	▼9.72
JSP	Dr. Santosh Singh	3,898	1.81	
Independent	Rakesh Kumar	2,667	1.24	
NOTA	None of the above	2,907	1.35	▲0.47
Majority		45,843	21.25	▲17.12
Turnout		215,758	65.12	▲10.12
BJP gain from JD(U)		Swing	▲56.92	

=== 2021 bypoll ===
By-election, 2021: Tarapur
Party	Candidate	Votes	%	±%
JD(U)	Rajeev Kumar Singh	79,090	46.62	+9.69
RJD	Arun Kumar Sah	75,238	44.35	+11.55
LJP	Kumar Chandan	5,364	3.16	−3.23
INC	Rajesh Kumar Mishra	3,590	2.12	New
Margin of victory		3,852	2.27	
Turnout		1,69,759	51.65	
JD(U) hold		Swing		

=== 2020 ===
2020 Bihar Legislative Assembly election: Tarapur
Party	Candidate	Votes	%	±%
JD(U)	Mewalal Chaudhary	64,468	36.93	−6.69
RJD	Divya Prakash	57,243	32.8	
LJP	Mina Devi	11,264	6.45	
Independent	Rajesh Kumar Mishra	10,466	6.0	
RLSP	Jitendra Kumar	5,110	2.93	
Jantantrik Vikas Party	Anita Devi	1,999	1.15	
Bhartiya Lok Chetna Party	Pramod Kumar Singh	1,850	1.06	
Independent	Deji Devi	1,799	1.03	
Independent	Om Prakash Rajak	1,791	1.03	
Independent	Jayram Singh	1,638	0.94	
NOTA	None of the above	1,534	0.88	−2.78
Majority		7,225	4.13	−3.72
Turnout		174,547	55.0	+2.35
JD(U) hold		Swing		

=== 2015 ===
2015 Bihar Legislative Assembly election: Tarapur
Party	Candidate	Votes	%	±%
JD(U)	Mewalal Chaudhary	66,411	43.62	
HAM(S)	Shakuni Choudhary	54,464	35.77	
JMM	Sanjay Kumar	5,017	3.3	
Independent	Karmvir Kumar Bharati	3,971	2.61	
Independent	Anil Kumar Singh	2,797	1.84	
SS	Gopal Krishna Barma	2,494	1.64	
CPI	Sagar Suman Singh	2,411	1.58	
RSMD	Vijay Kumar Singh	2,371	1.56	
Aap Aur Hum Party	Ram Prasad Sah	1,809	1.19	
JAP(L)	Anita Devi	1,567	1.03	
NOTA	None of the above	5,565	3.66	
Majority		11,947	7.85	
Turnout		152,249	52.65	
JD(U) hold		Swing		

=== 2010 ===
2010 Bihar Legislative Assembly election: Tarapur
Party	Candidate	Votes	%	±%
JD(U)	Neeta Choudhary	44,582	37.42	
RJD	Shakuni Choudhary	30,704	25.77	
INC	Sanjay Kumar	18,282	15.35	
JMM	Raman Kumar	9,167	7.69	
JPS	Sumitra Devi	4,089	3.43	
Majority		13,878	11.65	
Turnout		1,19,133	47.35	
JD(U) gain from RJD		Swing		

== See also ==
- List of Assembly constituencies of Bihar
