= Neeta Choudhary =

Indian politician (c.1969–2019)

MLA of Tarapur
- In office 2010–2015
- Preceded by: Shakuni Choudhary
- Succeeded by: Mewalal Chaudhary

Personal details
- Born: c. 1969
- Died: 2 June 2019 (aged 50)
- Party: Janata Dal (United)
- Spouse: Mewalal Chaudhary
- Children: 2

Neeta Choudhary (c. 1969 - 2 June 2019) was an Indian politician belonging to Janata Dal (United). She was elected as MLA of Tarapur in Bihar Legislative Assembly in 2010. Her husband Mewalal Choudhary was elected as MLA of Tarapur in 2015.

Neeta Choudhary and her husband Mewalal Choudhary suffered injuries in a gas cylinder explosion at their residence on 27 May 2019. She died on 2 June 2019 in Safdarjung Hospital, Delhi at the age of 50.

There were reports of conspiracy behind her death but nothing came out of it.
