= Chandra Shekhar Prasad Verma =

Indian parliamentarian, Lok Sabha

Member of the Indian Parliament, Lok Sabha
- In office 1984–1989
- Preceded by: Satish Prasad Singh
- Succeeded by: Ram Sharan Yadav
- Constituency: Khagaria Lok Sabha constituency

Personal details
- Party: Indian National Congress

Chandra Shekhar Prasad Verma was a member of Indian parliament, Lok Sabha.

== Career ==
He was an Indian National Congress politician, who was elected to 8th Lok Sabha by winning the Indian general election of 1984, from Khagaria Lok Sabha constituency. Verma belonged to Kushwaha caste of Bihar. He was one of the five parliamentarians from Kushwaha caste, who were elected to Lok Sabha from this constituency between 1957 and 2014. In 1984 general elections, he defeated notable trade union leader and Communist Party of India (Marxist) candidate, Yogeshwar Gop.
