= Yusuf Salahuddin =

Indian politician from the state of Bihar

Member of Bihar Legislative Assembly
- In office 11 November 2020 – 14 November 2025
- Preceded by: Zafar Alam
- Succeeded by: Sanjay Kumar Singh
- Constituency: Simri Bakhtiarpur

Personal details
- Born: 29 June 1982 (age 44) Simri Bakhtiyarpur, India
- Party: Rashtriya Janata Dal
- Spouse: Ayesha Salahuddin
- Education: Symbiosis College of Arts and Commerce

Yusuf Salahuddin (born 29 June 1982) is an Indian politician from the state of Bihar. As a Member of the Rashtriya Janata Dal, he represents the Simri Bakhtiarpur assembly seat in Bihar since 2020 to 2025.

Yusuf is the son of Lok Janshakti Party parliamentarian Mehboob Ali Kaiser and grandson of the late Choudhary Salahuddin (former Cabinet minister of Bihar). He belongs to a Nawab family and decedents of Nawab Nazirul Hasan of Simri Bakhtiyarpur (erstwhile princely state).
