= Rajeev Kumar Singh Kushwaha =

Indian politician

Rajeev Kumar Singh
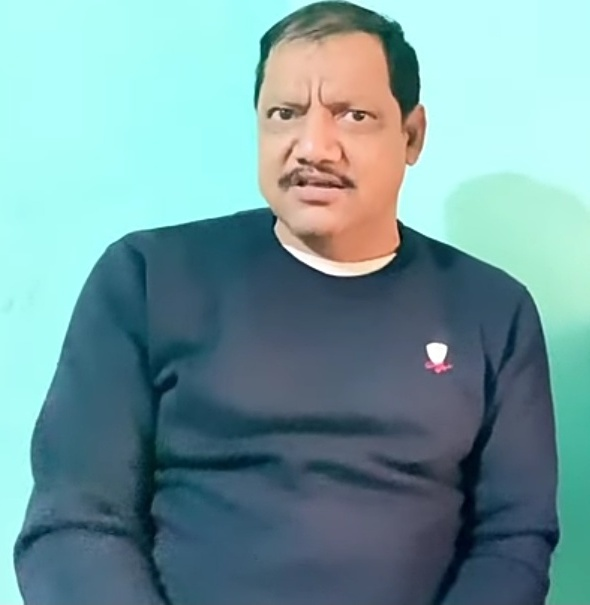
- Rajeev Kumar Singh

Member of the Bihar Legislative Assembly
- In office 2 November 2021 – 14 November 2025
- Preceded by: Mewalal Chaudhary
- Succeeded by: Samrat Chaudhary
- Constituency: Tarapur

Personal details
- Party: Janata Dal (United)

Rajeev Kumar Singh is a Member of Legislative Assembly (MLA) representing Tarapur constituency in the Bihar Legislative Assembly in India. He is a member of Janata Dal (United). He has been elected as the MLA on 2 November 2021. Singh got the ticket from Janata Dal (United) amidst the confusion over allocation of Tarapur constituency to Rohit Chaudhary, the younger brother of Chief Minister of Bihar, Samrat Chaudhary. The Tarapur constituency was the stronghold of Shakuni Choudhury, who had influence over Kushwaha voters, who are dominant in this assembly constituency. However, Rajiv Kumar Singh, himself a Kushwaha, was able to defeat his nearest rival in the bypolls of 2021.

== Political career ==
Janata Dal (United) made Rajiv Kumar Singh its candidate in the 2005 assembly elections held in February and October. But in both the elections, Singh had to face defeat from Rashtriya Janata Dal strongman, Shakuni Chowdhary. Prior to this, in the year 2000, Rajeev Kumar Singh had also contested on the ticket of Samata Party but he had to face defeat in that election too.

In 2020 Assembly polls, in Tarapur constituency, which has preponderance of Kushwaha caste, Rashtriya Janata Dal, which contested against Janata Dal United, made Divya Prakash (daughter of Jai Prakash Narayan Yadav) as their candidate. However, latter was defeated. In the bypolls that were conducted in 2021, RJD made Arun Sah as their candidate against Singh. Sah was a member of Bania (caste). Singh, however, became victorious in the by elections by a safe margin.

In 2022, Singh was engaged in battle of words against BJP leader Samrat Chaudhary. Chaudhary had commented that Nitish Kumar became minister for the first time due to his father Shakuni Chaudhary, who lobbied for him in front of his party's high command. However Singh attacked Chaudhary by saying that Nitish Kumar formed Samata Party and Shakuni Chaudhary was only second to join after him. Singh also declared himself to be the real leader of Kushwahas and challenged Chaudhary that he will contest the election against him to prove that he has got more support amongst his castemen.

In December 2022, Singh came into limelight after an audio went viral in which he was heard abusing and intimidating a patrolling officer working in his constituency. The victim accused him of intimidation and causing obstruction in his work.

== Electoral performance ==
By-election, 2021: Tarapur
Party	Candidate	Votes	%	±%
JD(U)	Rajeev Kumar Singh	79,090	46.62	+9.69
RJD	Arun Kumar Sah	75,238	44.35	+11.55
LJP	Kumar Chandan	5,364	3.16	−3.23
INC	Rajesh Kumar Mishra	3,590	2.12	New
Margin of victory		3,852	2.27	
Turnout		1,69,759	51.65	
JD(U) hold		Swing		
