= Narayan Yadav =

Indian politician

Member of the Bihar Legislative Assembly
- In office 1980–1985
- Preceded by: Kaushalaya Devi
- Succeeded by: Shakuni Choudhury
- Constituency: Tarapur

Narayan Yadav is an Indian politician and leader of Communist Party of India (CPI). He was former MLA represented Tarapur constituency from 1980 to 1985.
