= Ram Sharan Yadav =

Indian politician (1926–2005)

Member of Parliament, Lok Sabha
- In office 1989-96
- Preceded by: Chandra Shekhar Prasad Verma
- Succeeded by: Anil Kumar Yadav
- Constituency: Khagaria, Bihar

Personal details
- Born: 15 January 1926 Chukti Mansi, Khagaria District, Bihar, British India
- Died: 1 September 2005 (aged 79)
- Party: Janata Dal

Ram Sharan Yadav (15 January 1926 – 1 September 2005) was an Indian politician. He was elected to the Lok Sabha, lower house of the Parliament of India from Khagaria, Bihar in 1989 and 1991 as a member of the Janata Dal. He joined the Indian National Congress in controversial circumstances and voted on 28 July 1993 no confidence vote which served the Narasimha Rao Government. He contested in 1996 as an Indian National Congress candidate but lost.

Yadav died on 1 September 2005, at the age of 79.
