= Sanjay Kumar Singh (LJP politician) =

Indian politician from the state of Bihar

Member of Bihar Legislative Assembly
- In office 20 November 2025 – Present
- Preceded by: Yusuf Salahuddin
- Constituency: Simri Bakhtiarpur

Personal details
- Born: Saharsa, Bihar
- Party: Lok Janshakti Party
- Education: BNMU Madhepura, LNMU Darbhanga

Sanjay Kumar Singh is an Indian politician from the state of Bihar. As a Member of the Lok Jan Shakti Party, he represents the Simri Bakhtiarpur assembly seat in Bihar since 2025.

Sanjay is born in Dhakjri a village in Saharsa district in a Rajput Family. Her father is Late Bishnudeo Singh, Sanjay is one of the richest MLA from Bihar in. Bihar legislative assembly 2025.
