= Jiyalal Mandal =

Politician from India

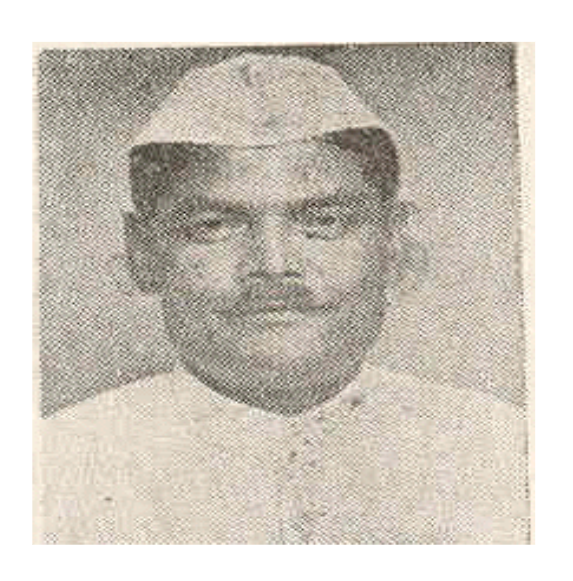
- Sri Jiyalal Mandal

Member of Parliament, Lok Sabha
- In office 1957-1967
- Preceded by: Constituency Established
- Succeeded by: Kameshwar Prasad Singh
- Constituency: Khagaria, Bihar

Personal details
- Born: 3 March 1915 Simri Bakhtiarpur, Tola- Ranginiya,Bihar, British India
- Died: 9 February 1973 (aged 57) Ranginiya, Simri Bakhtairpur (Saharsa)
- Party: Indian National Congress
- Spouse: Malti Devi
- Children: Pashupati Narayan, Uma Devi, Susila Devi

Jiyalal Mandal (3 March 1915 – 9 February 1973) was an Indian politician and freedom fighter. He was elected to the Lok Sabha, lower house of the Parliament of India from Khagaria, Bihar as member of the Indian National Congress.
