= Simri Bakhtiarpur Assembly constituency =

Coordinates: 25°42′41″N 86°35′45″E

Simri Bakhtiarpur
- Constituency No. 76 for the Bihar Legislative Assembly

Constituency details
- Country: India
- Region: East India
- State: Bihar
- District: Saharsa
- Lok Sabha constituency: Khagaria
- Established: 1951
- Total electors: 336,967

Member of Legislative Assembly
- 18th Bihar Legislative Assembly
- Incumbent Sanjay Kumar Singh
- Party: LJP(RV)
- Alliance: NDA
- Elected year: 2025

Simri Bakhtiarpur Assembly constituency is an assembly constituency in Saharsa district in the Indian state of Bihar.

== Overview ==
As per Delimitation of Parliamentary and Assembly constituencies Order, 2008, No. 76 Simri Bakhtiarpur Assembly constituency is composed of the following: Simri Bakhtiyarpur and Salkhua community development blocks; Ghoghepur, Jhara, Aeina, Maheshi North, Maheshi South, Rajanpur, Sirwar Naharwar gram panchayats of Mahishi CD Block.

Simri Bakhtiarpur Assembly constituency is part of No. 25 Khagaria (Lok Sabha constituency) Present MP Rajesh Verma and MLA Yusuf Salahuddin.

== Members of the Legislative Assembly ==
Year	Name	Party
1952	Jiyalal Mandal	Indian National Congress
1957	Mohammed Salauddin	Indian National Congress
1962	Mohammed Salauddin	Indian National Congress
1969	Ram Chandra Prasad	Samyukta Socialist Party
1972	Mohammad Salahuddin	Indian National Congress
1977	Mohammad Salahuddin	Indian National Congress
1980	Mohammad Salahuddin	Indian National Congress
1985	Mohammad Salahuddin	Indian National Congress
1990	Dinesh Chandra Yadav	Janata Dal
1995	Mehboob Ali Kaiser	Indian National Congress
2000	Mehboob Ali Kaiser	Indian National Congress
2005	Dinesh Chandra Yadav	Janata Dal (United)
2005	Dinesh Chandra Yadav	Janata Dal (United)
2009^	Mehboob Ali Kaiser	Indian National Congress
2010	Arun Kumar	Janata Dal (United)
2015	Dinesh Chandra Yadav	Janata Dal (United)
2019^	Zafar Alam	Rashtriya Janata Dal
2020	Yusuf Salahuddin	Rashtriya Janata Dal
2025	Sanjay Kumar Singh	Lok Janshakti Party (Ram Vilas)

^by-election

== Election results ==
=== 2025 ===
2025 Bihar Legislative Assembly election: Simri Bakhtiarpur
Party	Candidate	Votes	%	±%
LJP(RV)	Sanjay Kumar Singh	109,699	46.94	
RJD	Yusuf Salahuddin	101,769	43.54	+5.06
Independent	Vikas Raj	7,493	3.21	
JSP	Surendra Yadav	2,270	0.97	
NOTA	None of the above	4,996	2.14	+1.42
Majority		7,930	3.4	+2.5
Turnout		233,725	69.36	+11.27
LJP(RV) gain from RJD		Swing		

=== 2020 ===
2020 Bihar Legislative Assembly election: Simri Bakhtirapur
Party	Candidate	Votes	%	±%
RJD	Yusuf Salahuddin	75,684	38.48	
VIP	Mukesh Sahani	73,925	37.58	
LJP	Sanjay Kumar Singh	6,962	3.54	−21.1
Aadarsh Mithila Party	Umesh Chandra Bharti	5,296	2.69	
Independent	Khagesh Kumar Sah	4,752	2.42	
JAP(L)	Zafar Alam	4,012	2.04	+0.94
Independent	Ritesh Ranjan	2,840	1.44	−4.52
Independent	Domi Sharma	2,635	1.34	
Independent	Sulendra Das	2,361	1.2	
Aam Adhikar Morcha	Dhirendra Choudhary	2,260	1.15	
LPSP	Rajesh Kumar	2,159	1.1	
Log Jan Party Secular	Pintu Sharma	2,137	1.09	
NOTA	None of the above	1,407	0.72	−3.88
Majority		1,759	0.9	−21.98
Turnout		196,700	58.09	+3.79
RJD gain from JD(U)		Swing		

=== 2015 ===
2015 Bihar Legislative Assembly election: Simri Bakhtiarpur
Party	Candidate	Votes	%	±%
JD(U)	Dinesh Chandra Yadav	78,514	47.52	
LJP	Yusuf Salahuddin	40,708	24.64	
Independent	Ritesh Ranjan	9,847	5.96	
Sarvajan Kalyan Loktantrik Party	Ganesh Mukhiya Nishad	6,843	4.14	
Independent	Yaduvansh Roy	3,766	2.28	
JMM	Dinesh Kumar Choudhary	3,717	2.25	
Independent	Arbind Kumar Singh	3,705	2.24	
Independent	Upendra Yadav	2,290	1.39	
JAP(L)	Dharamavir Yadav	1,825	1.1	
BSP	Binod Paswan	1,762	1.07	
Independent	Arvind Kumar	1,603	0.97	
NOTA	None of the above	7,601	4.6	
Majority		37,806	22.88	
Turnout		165,233	54.3	

=== 2010 ===
In the 2010 state assembly elections, Dr. Arun Kumar of JD(U) won the Simri Bakhtirapur assembly seat defeating his nearest rival Choudhry Mehboob Ali Kaisar of Congress. Contests in most years were multi cornered but only winners and runners up are being mentioned. In the October 2005 and February 2005 state assembly elections Dinesh Chandra Yadav of JD(U) defeated Choudhry Mehboob Ali Kaiser of Congress and Zafar Alam of RJD respectively. Choudhry Md. Mehboob Ali Kaiser of Congress defeated Zafar Alam of RJD in 2000 and Dinesh Chandra Yadav of JD in 1995. Dinesh Chandra Yadav of JD defeated Mehboob Ali Kaiser of Congress in 1990. Choudhary Mohammad Salahuddin of Congress defeated Dinesh Chandra Yadav representing Lok Dal in 1985 and representing Janata Party (Secular – Charan Singh) in 1980, and Ayodhya Prasad Yadav, Independent, in 1977.
