= Zafar Alam (Bihar politician) =

Indian politician

Bihar Legislative Assembly
- In office 24 October 2019 – 2020
- Preceded by: Dinesh Chandra Yadav
- Succeeded by: Yusuf Salahuddin
- Constituency: Simri Bakhtiarpur

Personal details
- Party: Rashtriya Janata Dal

Zafar Alam is an Indian politician in the Rashtriya Janata Dal party. He was elected as a member of the Bihar Legislative Assembly from Simri Bakhtiarpur on 24 October 2019.
