= Barsam, Bihar =

Barsam
- village
- Location in Bihar, India Barsam (India)
- Coordinates: 25.78°N 86.64°E
- Country: India
- State: Bihar
- Region: Mithila
- District: Saharsa

Languages
  - Official: Hindi, Maithili
- Time zone: UTC+5:30 (IST)
- PIN: 852221
- Vehicle registration: BR

Barsam is a village in the north east corner of Saharsa district in the north Indian state of Bihar. In the 2011 Indian census, it had a population of 5,089.

== See also ==
- Saharsa – the municipality
- List of villages in Saharsa district
