= Sagar Institute of Science and Technology =

Sagar Institute of Science & Technology (SISTec)
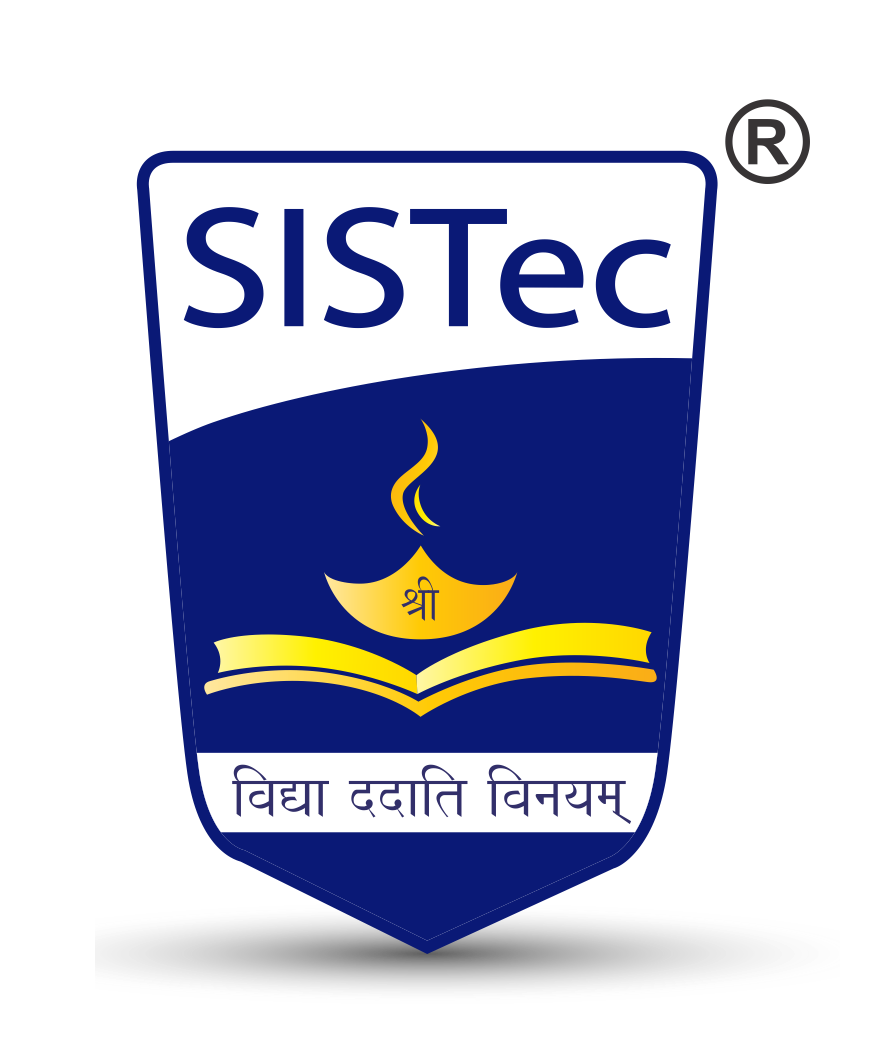
- Other names: Sagar Group of Institutions, Sagar College, Sagar Institute, SGI Bhopal
- Motto: विद्या ददाति विनयम्
- Motto in English: Transmitting Professionalism
- Type: Private
- Established: 2007
- Founder: Shri Sudhir Kumar Agrawal
- Parent institution: Sagar Group
- Accreditation: National Assessment and Accreditation Council (NAAC) and National Accreditation Board (NBA)
- Affiliations: RGPV and BU Bhopal
- Chairman: Shri Sudhir Kumar Agrawal
- Director: Dr. Jyoti Deshmukh
- Undergraduates: 5,000+
- Location: Bhopal, Madhya Pradesh, India
- Campus: Private
- Website: www.sistec.ac.in

Sagar Institute of Science & Technology (SISTec) is a NAAC-accredited college with NBA-accredited programs located in Bhopal, Madhya Pradesh, , with two campuses, one in Gandhi Nagar and the other in Ratibad. The institute is approved by All India Council for Technical Education (AICTE). It is affiliated to Rajiv Gandhi Proudyogiki Vishwavidyalaya (RGPV) for its engineering and pharmacy programs and with Barkatullah University (BU Bhopal) for its Management programs.

Sagar Group of Institutions is known for its focus on technical and professional education

and industry-oriented academic practices.

== History ==
Sagar Group of Institutions, an educational entity of the Sagar Group , includes three engineering colleges [Sagar Institute of Science and Technology (SISTec), Sagar Institute of Science Technology and Research (SISTec-R) and Sagar Institute of Science Technology and Engineering (SISTec-E)], two pharmacy institutes [Sagar Institute of Pharmacy and Technology (SIPTec)], [Sagar Institute of Pharmaceutical Technology and Research (SIPTec-R)], and a management institute [SISTec Business School].

The group imparts schooling through the chain of Sagar Public Schools (SPS) to nurture the young mind. Today, Sagar Group of Institutions is considered as the most preferred brand for holistic education.

== Sagar Group of Institutions ==
Sagar Group of Institutions (SGI) is an educational group based in India, comprising 22+ campuses across higher education and school education. The group serves a student network of over 25,000 students and is supported by more than 2,000 faculty members.

The institutions under the Sagar Group of Institutions include:

Higher Education Institutions:

- Sagar Institute of Science and Technology (SISTec)
- Sagar Institute of Science, Technology & Engineering (SISTec-E)
- Sagar Institute of Science, Technology & Research (SISTec-R)
- Sagar Institute of Pharmacy & Technology (SIPTec)
- Sagar Institute of Pharmaceutical Technology & Research (SIPTec - R)
- Sagar Institute of Science & Technology - SISTec Business School

Schools

- Sagar Public School, Saket Nagar (SPS-SN)
- Sagar Public School, Gandhi Nagar (SPS-GN)
- Sagar Public School, Rohit Nagar (SPS-RN)
- Sagar Public School, Ratibad (SPS-RB)
- Sagar Public School, Katara Extension (SPS-KE)
- Sagar Public School, Dwarka Dham (SPS-DD)

== Awards & Recognition ==
- The Economic Times Changemakers of Madhya Pradesh 2.0 Award
- National Employability Award 2025
- Prestigious Business & Management Institution Award 2025
- Award for Leading Institution for Quality Placements
- Navdunia Jyotirmaya Award 2024
- Jagran Josh Education Award 2024
- National Employability Award 2024
- National Employability Award 2023
- Student’s Choice Award 2022
- Excellence in Providing Preferred Environment for Placements – Central India Award 2022 (ASSOCHAM India)
- National Employability Award 2022
- Excellence in Promoting Industry-Academic Interface Award - 2021 by ASSOCHAM
- National Employability Award 2021
- ARIIA 2021 Ranking – Performer Band under Colleges/Institutes (Private/Self-Financed) (Technical)
- Best Placement in Central India Award 2020 (ZEE MPCG News)
- Excellence in Education Award 2020 (ZEE MPCG News)
- ARIIA-2020 Ranking (Top 51-75 Private/Self-Financed College/Institutes in Bhopal Madhya Pradesh)
- Emerging Engineering Institute of the Year – Central India 2019 (ASSOCHAM)
- Most Innovative College Award – North Zone 2018 (AICTE)
- Best Technical Institution Excellence Award 2017 (IBC 24 News Channel)
- Most Upcoming Engineering College in India 2017 (ASSOCHAM)
- Most Upcoming Engineering College in India 2016 (ASSOCHAM)
- Icon for Excellence in MBA Education (94.3 MY FM)

== Campus Facilities ==
- 40+ acre green campus
- 250+ well-equipped laboratories
- Digitally enabled classrooms
- Open-air amphitheater
- Learning Resource Centre (Library) with 45,000+ books, journals, e-resources, and study materials
- On-campus hostel and mess facilities accommodating 1,000+ students, with separate arrangements for boys and girls
- Six-lane swimming pool
- Fleet of 100+ buses
- Well-equipped gymnasium
- ATM facility
- Canteen
- Futsal court

== Events and Activities ==
- Sagar Fiesta and Sagar Euphoria (Annual Techno-Cultural Fest)
- Sagar Manthan (Training & Placement Seminar and Workshop)
- Sagar Therafest (Annual Cultural Fest of SIPTec)
- Sagar Exuberance (Annual Cultural Fest of Management)
- SISTec Headstart (Industry-Academia Forum)
- TEDx SISTec
- Quad Torc (National Level ATV/Buggy Design, Fabrication, and Racing Championship)
- Sagar Glory (Annual Celebration acknowledging the success of Placed Students)
- Sagar Samarthya (360 Degree Student Assessment Programme)
- NIRMAAN (Annual National Level Working Model Competition)
- Samadhaan (National Level Hackathon)
- SISTec Innovation Hackathon (SIH)
- Workshop for SSB Commandants
- Confluentia Alumni Meet
- Mini Anveshana
- MSME Idea Hackathon
- Industrial Visits
- Expert Lectures, Hands-on workshop, and Tech Talks
- Celebrity Nights (Musical Performances)
- Semester Break Trainings (Industry-Oriented Practical Learning Sessions)

== Institute's USP ==
- Outcome-Based & Industry-Oriented Education
- Strong Industry & Corporate Connect
- Innovation & Entrepreneurship Ecosystem
- ERP-Based Academic Governance
- Experienced & Research-Oriented Faculty
- Excellent Placement & Career Support
- Modern Infrastructure & Smart Campus
- Holistic Student Development
- Quality-Driven Education with National Accreditation

== Training & Placement Highlights ==
- 97.2% Campus Placement
- 1150+ Job offers for 2024 - 25 Batch
- 21 LPA highest package offered by Infosys
- 200+ Companies Visited
- 100% Internships
- 30 Industrial Visits
- 30+ MoUs
