= Shakuni Choudhary =

Indian politician (born 1936)

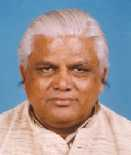

Member of Parliament, Lok Sabha
- In office 10 March 1998 — 26 April 1999
- Preceded by: Anil Kumar Yadav
- Succeeded by: Renu Kumari Singh
- Constituency: Khagaria, Bihar

Member of Bihar Legislative Assembly
- In office (1985-1998), (2000-2010)
- Preceded by: Narayan Yadav(1985); Parvati Devi(2000)
- Succeeded by: Neeta Choudhary
- Constituency: Tarapur Assembly constituency

Personal details
- Born: 4 January 1936 (age 90) Lakhanpur, Munger district, British India (present day Bihar, India)
- Party: SAP
- Other political affiliations: RJD; JD(U); HAM(S)
- Spouse: Parvati Devi
- Children: 5 (incl. Samrat Choudhary)

Shakuni Choudhary (born 4 January 1936) is an Indian politician who is a founding member of Samata Party. He was elected to the Lok Sabha, lower house of the Parliament of India from Khagaria Lok Sabha constituency as member of the Samata Party. Choudhary has been known for political defection and has remained Deputy Speaker in the Bihar Legislative Assembly. Chaudhary is a six time MLA from Tarapur Assembly constituency of Munger district.

He was a former loyal to the Rashtriya Janata Dal (RJD) but left the party on the ground of it promoting the interest of Lalu Prasad Yadav's family. The defection happened soon after his son Samrat Choudhary orchestrated a split in RJD by alienating thirteen MLAs to seek recognition as separate splinter group.

== Personal life ==
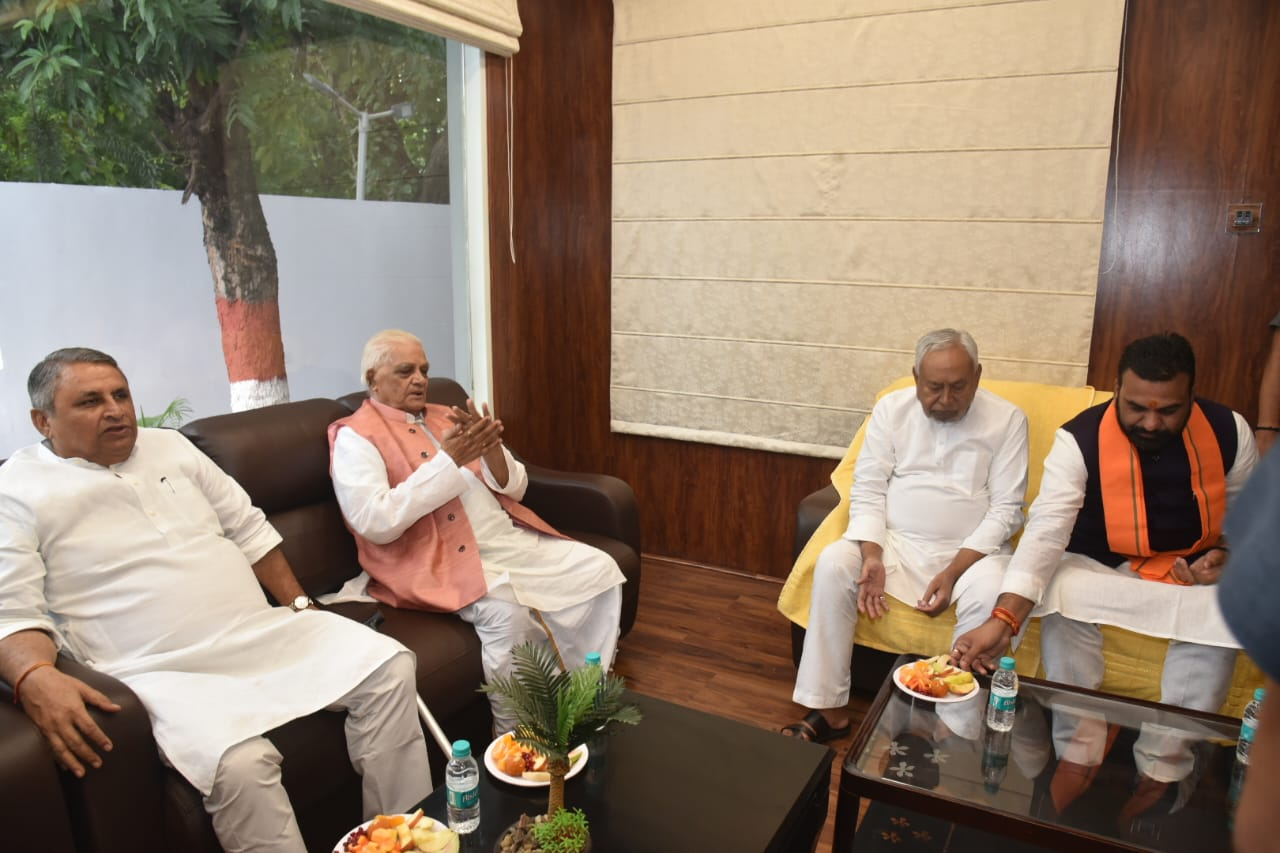
Shakuni Choudhary and his son Samrat Chaudhary hosting Nitish Kumar at their house warming ceremony on 14 October 2024.

Choudhary was born on 4 January 1936 in Lakhanpur village of Munger district. He is married to Parvati Devi. Choudhary belongs to Koeri community and had claimed to hold significant hold over his community in the state. His ancestral village is in Lakhanpur in Tarapur block of Munger district. His son Samrat Choudhary is a Member of Legislative Council from the Bharatiya Janata Party. Choudhary has served in the Indian Army for 15 years after that he joined active politics.

== Political career ==
Choudhary was elected to the Bihar Legislative Assembly from Tarapur constituency in Munger district of Bihar in 1985 as Independent politician. Later joined Indian National Congress and won the same seat in 1990 Bihar Legislative Assembly election. In 1995 Bihar Legislative Assembly election, he shifted allegiance to Samata Party of George Fernandes.

In 1995 Bihar Assembly elections, the Tarapur constituency came into limelight, when the candidate of Indian National Congress, Sachidanand Singh was attacked by grenades along with his supporters. Singh was taken to a hospital at Tarapur; the hospital was subsequently attacked and Singh was assassinated. In these subsequent incidents, nine people were killed. A total of thirty three people were accused in this case, among them, Choudhary was one of the main accused. However, the investigations were halted after some time. Soon after this incident, in the counting of votes, Choudhary was declared winner in the 1995 Assembly elections.

In 1998, he was elected to Lok Sabha from Khagaria, Bihar, as member of the Samata Party by defeating Anil Kumar Yadav of Rashtriya Janata Dal. He was elected to Bihar Legislative Assembly in 2000 Bihar Election from Tarapur constituency as a member of Rashtriya Janata Dal and was made a minister in Rabri Devi cabinet.

In 2015, he joined the rebellion of Jitan Ram Manjhi and joined Hindustani Awam Morcha a party created by Manjhi after his exit from Janata Dal (United). He was made Bihar State President of Hindustani Awam Morcha. He again contests in 2015 Bihar Election from Tarapur constituency as a member of Hindustani Awam Morcha but lost to Mewalal Chaudhary of Janata Dal (United) by about 12,000 votes. After the dismal performance of the party, he quit the Party chief position and politics.

However, in 2019, Choudhary addressed a meeting of the Bharatiya Janata Party leaders and gave indication of joining active politics once again with the membership of the BJP. Between 1985 and 2010, he represented Tarapur Assembly constituency for six times with his tenure as legislator spanning over three decades. In 2021, his younger son Rohit Chaudhary was inducted into Janata Dal United by the party leadership with an eye over formidable Kushwaha votes in the constituency. It is reported that due to his influence in Munger region, the member of parliament, Lalan Singh, who represents the constituency in Lok Sabha rushed to his house to take his blessing soon after filing of nomination papers by JDU candidate Rajeev Kumar Singh Kushwaha for the 2021 bypolls to ensure latter's victory .
