= Khagaria Lok Sabha constituency =

Legislative Assembly constituency in Bihar

Coordinates: 25.5°N 86.5°E

Khagaria
- Lok Sabha constituency

Constituency details
- Country: India
- Region: East India
- State: Bihar
- Assembly constituencies: Simri Bakhtiarpur; Hasanpur; Alauli; Khagaria; Beldaur; Parbatta
- Established: 1957
- Total electors: 1,673,314 (in 2019)
- Reservation: None

Member of Parliament
- 18th Lok Sabha
- Incumbent Rajesh Verma
- Party: LJP(RV)
- Alliance: NDA
- Elected year: 2024
- Preceded by: Mehboob Ali Kaiser

Khagaria Lok Sabha constituency is one of the 40 Lok Sabha (parliamentary) constituencies in Bihar state in eastern India. This constituency came into existence in 1957 and from 1957 to 2019, the constituency has elected six parliamentarians from the Yadav caste as well as five parliamentarians from the Kushwaha caste. Both the Yadav and Kushwaha communities are preponderant in this constituency and dominate the political scenario.

== History ==
In this constituency a total of eleven candidates from Yadav and Koeri caste has been elected between 1957 and 2019 general elections. The Koeri candidates who became MPs from this constituency are Kameshwar Prasad Singh, Chandra Shekhar Prasad Verma, Satish Prasad Singh, Shakuni Choudhury and Renu Kushwaha. In 2024 Indian general elections, the INDIA alliance put Sanjay Kushwaha against Rajesh Verma of National Democratic Alliance. Sanjay Kushwaha who belonged to Koeri caste was sought as candidate to fulfill region's caste dynamics. The CPI(M) candidate Sanjay Kumar was also picked up by alliance as his father Yogendra Singh Kushwaha has been an MLA from Khagaria Assembly constituency located within this Lok Sabha constituency and the voters were supposed to prefer local candidate against outsider. Besides this, according to CPI(M)'s official social media handles, Kushwaha is a nephew of Indian independence activist Prabhu Narayan, who was martyred during 1942 Quit India movement, while trying to unfurl India's national flag, at the age of 21.

== Assembly segments ==
Since last delimitation exercise, from 2009 Lok Sabha elections Khagaria Lok Sabha constituency comprised the following six Vidhan Sabha (legislative assembly) segments:

#	Name	District	Member	Party	2024 lead
76	Simri Bakhtiarpur	Saharsa	Sanjay Kumar Singh	LJP(RV)	LJP(RV)
140	Hasanpur	Samastipur	Raj Kumar Ray	JD(U)	LJP(RV)
148	Alauli (SC)	Khagaria	Ram Chandra Sada	JD(U)	LJP(RV)
149	Khagaria	Khagaria	Bablu Kumar	JD(U)	LJP(RV)
150	Beldaur	Khagaria	Panna Lal Singh Patel	JD(U)	LJP(RV)
151	Parbatta	Khagaria	Babulal Shorya	LJP(RV)	LJP(RV)

== Members of Parliament ==
Year	Name	Party
1957	Jiyalal Mandal	Indian National Congress
1962	Jiyalal Mandal	Indian National Congress
1967	Kameshwar Prasad Singh	Samyukta Socialist Party
1971	Shiva Shankar Prasad Yadav	Samyukta Socialist Party
1977	Gyaneshwar Prasad Yadav	Janata Party
1980	Satish Prasad Singh	Indian National Congress
1984	Chandra Shekhar Prasad Verma	Indian National Congress
1989	Ram Sharan Yadav	Janata Dal
1991	Ram Sharan Yadav	Janata Dal
1996	Anil Kumar Yadav	Janata Dal
1998	Shakuni Choudhary	Samata Party
1999	Renu Kushawaha	Janata Dal (United)
2004	Rabindra Kumar Rana	Rashtriya Janata Dal
2009	Dinesh Chandra Yadav	Janata Dal (United)
2014	Mehboob Ali Kaiser	Lok Janshakti Party
2019	Mehboob Ali Kaiser	Lok Janshakti Party
2024	Rajesh Verma	Lok Janshakti Party (Ram Vilas)

== Election results ==
=== 2024 ===
2024 Indian general elections: Khagaria
Party	Candidate	Votes	%	±%
LJP(RV)	Rajesh Verma	538,657	50.73	
CPI(M)	Sanjay Kumar Kushwaha	3,77,526	35.55	
NOTA	None of the above	31,111	2.93	
Majority		1,61,131		
Turnout		10,62,299	57.62	
LJP(RV) gain from LJP		Swing		

=== 2019 ===
2019 Indian general elections: Khagaria
Party	Candidate	Votes	%	±%
LJP	Mehboob Ali Kaiser	510,193	52.77	
VIP	Mukesh Sahani	2,61,623	27.06	
Independent	Priadarshi Dinkar	51,847	5.36	
NOTA	None of the Above	7,596	0.79	
Majority		2,48,570	25.71	
Turnout		9,67,411	57.7	
LJP hold		Swing		

=== General elections 2014 ===
2014 Indian general elections: Khagaria
Party	Candidate	Votes	%	±%
LJP	Mehboob Ali Kaiser	3,13,806	35.01	
RJD	Krishna Yadav	2,37,803	26.53	
JD(U)	Dinesh Chandra Yadav	2,20,316	24.58	
NOTA	None of the Above	23,868	2.66	
Majority		76,003	8.48	
Turnout		8,96,310	59.49	
LJP gain from JD(U)		Swing		

== See also ==
- Khagaria district
- List of constituencies of the Lok Sabha
