= Vikassheel Insaan Party =

- Abbreviation: VIP
- President: Santosh Sahani
- National convener: Mukesh Sahani
- Founder: Mukesh Sahani
- Founded: 4 November 2018 (7 years ago)
- Headquarters: 3rd Floor, Faizal Imam Complex, Fraser Rd, Patna, Bihar 800001
- Ideology: Social democracy
- Political position: Centre-left
- National affiliation: INDIA (2024–present); NDA (2020–2022); UPA (2019–2020)
- Colours: Orange, Blue and Green
- Seats in the Rajya Sabha: 0 / 245
- Seats in the Lok Sabha: 0 / 543
- Seats in the Bihar Legislative Assembly: 0 / 243
- Seats in the Bihar Legislative Council: 0 / 75

Election symbol
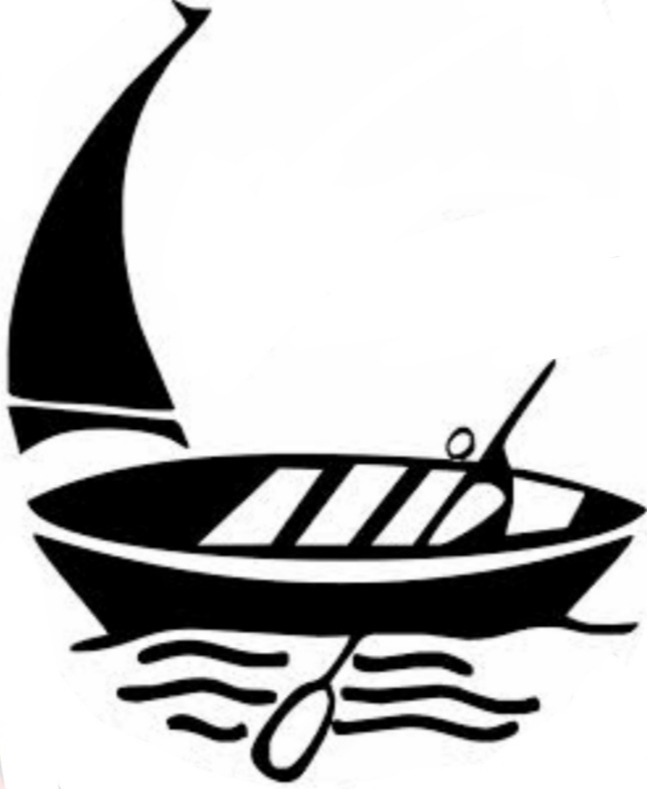

Website
- www.vipparty.in

The Vikassheel Insaan Party is an Indian political party, formally launched on 4 November 2018, by Bollywood set designer Mukesh Sahani, who campaigned for the Bharatiya Janata Party during the 2015 Bihar Legislative Assembly election. They contested in three Lok Sabha constituencies in 2019 from Madhubani, Muzaffarpur and Khagaria but failed to win any seats. The support base for the party consists mainly of the Nishad, Nonia, Bind, Beldar community, which comprises 20 sub-castes of fisherman and boatmen.

== 2020 Bihar Assembly elections ==
Vikassheel Insaan Party was initially aligned to the Mahagathbandhan but amidst confusion in seat sharing due to regressive stance taken by Rashtriya Janata Dal to not give required importance to its small allies, Mukesh Sahani walked out of the alliance. He was welcomed by National Democratic Alliance, and was given a total of 11 seats to contest in Bihar. The party was successful, and though Sahani himself lost the election, his party won four seats.

Mukesh Sahani was later elected to Bihar Legislative Council but not on a six-year term but instead a one and a half year term which expired in July 2022.

== Electoral performance ==
=== Lok Sabha elections ===
| Lok Sabha term | Indian general election | Seats contested | Seats won | Votes polled | Vote % | Ref. |
|---|---|---|---|---|---|---|
| 17th Lok Sabha | 2019 | 3 | 0 | 6,60,706 | 1.66% | |
| 18th Lok Sabha | 2024 | 3 | 0 | 1,187,455 | 2.71% | |

=== Bihar Vidhan Sabha (Lower House) Election ===
| Vidhan Sabha Term | Assembly Elections | Seats Contested | Seats Won | Votes Polled | % of votes | Ref |
|---|---|---|---|---|---|---|
| 17th Vidhan Sabha of Bihar | 2020 | 11 | 4 / 11 | 6,39,840 | 1.52% | |
| 18th Vidhan Sabha of Bihar | 2025 | 12 | 0 / 12 | 689,484 | 1.37% | |

== Defections in 2022 ==
Mukesh Sahani, the President of the party decided to run against his ally party BJP in the Uttar Pradesh 2022 Legislative Assembly elections and said he would field 160 candidates, he said that his main goal was to "oust the (incumbent) BJP government." He proceeded to field 55 candidates against his ally in Bihar, however none of them were able to win. Following the party's loss in the Uttar Pradesh Elections, a BJP MLA said that his chapter is over in Bihar politics and he should be ousted as the minister and also hinted a coup against him in the party. Sahani then proceeded to ignore NDA seat distribution for Bihar Legislative Council elections and again fielded seven candidates against BJP.

On 23 March 2022, all three MLAs of the party defected into BJP, leaving the party with no MLAs.

== Performance of Individual Candidates from 2025 Bihar Assembly Elections ==
| AC No. | AC Name | Candidate name | Gender | Age | Category | Total Votes | Vote % |
|---|---|---|---|---|---|---|---|
| 51 | Sikti | Hari Narayan Pramanik | Male | 50 | General | 92,020 | 41.78 |
| 63 | Katihar | Saurav Kumar Agarwal | Male | 39 | General | 78,101 | 39.36 |
| 83 | Darbhanga | Umesh Sahani | Male | 59 | General | 72,860 | 37.13 |
| 5 | Lauriya | Ran Kaushal Pratap Singh | Male | 45 | General | 69,544 | 36.29 |
| 152 | Bihpur | Arpana Kumari | Female | 38 | General | 61,433 | 35.19 |
| 15 | Kesaria | Varun Vijay | Male | 38 | General | 61,852 | 35.01 |
| 96 | Baruraj | Rakesh Kumar | Male | 44 | General | 67,827 | 33.00 |
| 70 | Alamnagar | Nabin Kumar | Male | 40 | General | 82,936 | 32.35 |
| 153 | Gopalpur | Prem Sagar Alias Dablu Yadav | Male | 49 | General | 50,495 | 26.38 |
| 89 | Aurai | Bhogendra Sahni | Male | 40 | General | 46,879 | 22.55 |
| 206 | Chainpur | Govind Vind | Male | 43 | General | 5,144 | 2.25 |
| 79 | Gaura Bauram | Santosh Sahani | Male | 39 | General | 393 | 0.23 |

NOTE:

- 1. The Vikassheel Insaan Party (VIP) contested 12 seats as part of the Rashtriya Janata Dal (RJD)–led Mahagathbandhan alliance.
- 2. The party failed to win any seats and lost its security deposits in two constituencies, having secured less than 16.67 percent of the valid votes in those constituencies.
- 3. The nomination of VIP candidate Shashi Bhushan Singh from the Sugauli constituency was rejected.
- 4. The nomination of VIP candidate Ganesh Bharti from the Kusheshwar Asthan constituency was also rejected; he subsequently contested the election as an Independent candidate from the same constituency.
- 5. The election symbol allotted to the party by the Election Commission of India was “Boat with man and sail.”
- 6. The party secured a total of 689,484 votes, accounting for 1.37 percent of the total votes polled across Bihar and 28.53 percent of the votes in the constituencies it contested.

== See also ==
- Mahagathbandhan (Bihar)
- List of political parties in India
