= Prabhu Narayan =

Indian independence activist (1921–42)

Shaheed Prabhu Narayan
- Born: 1921; Marar village, Khagaria district
- Died: 13 August 1942; Mungeria square, Khagaria
- Cause of death: Murder
- Father: Shital Mahto/Sita Mahto

Prabhu Narayan also spelt as Prabhu Narain was an Indian independence activist, who is known for his participation in Quit India movement of 1942. A resident of Khagaria district of Bihar, Narain was killed in 1942 while leading a flag procession during police firing.

== Life ==
Prabhu Narain was born in 1921 to Sheetal Prasad Singh also known as Shital Mahto and Champa Devi in a Koeri family, in a village called Marar in Khagaria district of Bihar. He was an agitator from his early days and used to work for the right of agricultural labourers in his village. He was often also involved in protesting against their employers for the fair wages. His primary education was completed at Ramganj while he completed his middle school education from Shyamlal High school. He was married to Siya Devi at a young age and during his martyrdom his wife was pregnant. She gave birth to his son who was named Himmat Singh.

For higher education, he moved to Banaras Hindu University. During this period there used to be a special class on Indian national movement in the university to bring more and more educated youths in the India's freedom struggle. Narain was motivated to join Indian independence movement at the call of Mahatma Gandhi and in August 1942, he moved from Banaras to Khagaria to take part in Quit India movement.

On 13 August 1942, he was joined by another independence activist Bharat Poddar who was a resident of Thana Chowk in Khagaria in the protest of 1942. The protesters were led by Narain, and they marched towards police station near Mungeria square to unfurl the national flag of India in order to show their resentment to colonial rule. At Benjamin square, they were joined by activist Motilal and Munshilal Verma. As the protesters marched forward, British Indian police fired upon them, killing Narain. After the news of his death spread, the commoners gathered from the nearby villages and in association with the protesters, they looted the Olapur police station.

== Commemoration ==
In commemoration of Narain's role in 1942 movement, the place of his death was named as Shaheed Prabhu Narain square upon his name and a life size statue of Narain has been established there.

== See also ==
- Nanak Bheel
