= Mehboob Ali Kaiser =

Indian politician

Choudhary Mehboob Ali Kaiser

Vice President of Rashtriya Janata Dal
- Incumbent
- Assumed office 21 April 2024

Member of the 16th Lok Sabha
- In office 16 May 2014 – 4 June 2024
- Preceded by: Dinesh Chandra Yadav
- Succeeded by: Rajesh Verma
- Constituency: Khagaria

President of Bihar Pradesh Congress Committee
- In office 2010–2013
- Preceded by: Anil Kumar Sharma
- Succeeded by: Ashok Chaudhary

Personal details
- Born: 13 May 1958 (age 68) Saharsa, Bihar, India
- Party: Rashtriya Janata Dal
- Other political affiliations: Indian National Congress Lok Janshakti Party
- Spouse: Sahiba Ali (m. 1981)
- Children: 3 (2 daughters, 1 son)
- Education: Aligarh Muslim University
- As of 12 December, 2016

Choudhary Mehboob Ali Kaiser is an Indian politician and Member of Parliament from Khagaria Lok Sabha Constituency. He started his political career from Indian National Congress. He was Member of Legislative Assembly where he represented Simri-Bakhtiarpur constituency for three terms. He also served as Cabinet Minister in Bihar Government. After being denied ticket by Indian National Congress for General Elections in 2014, he joined Lok Janshakti Party days before 2014 general election and successfully contested from Khagaria constituency.

== Early life ==
Mehboob Ali Kaiser was born in Saharsa and he is son of Late Choudhary Salahuddin who was a former Cabinet minister of Bihar. He belongs to a Nawab family and is the grandson of Nawab Nazirul Hasan of Simri Bakhtiyarpur (erstwhile princely state). He served as Minister for Science and Technology & Minister of Higher Education in Bihar Government. He studied at Aligarh Muslim University.

== Career ==
Mehboob Ali Kaiser was a Secretary in All-India Congress Committee (AICC) from 2007 to 2010.

He was the President of the Bihar Pradesh Congress Committee from 2010 to 2013.

He later joined RJD on 21 April 2024.
