= Dinesh Chandra Yadav (Indian politician) =

Indian politician

- Born: 1 July 1951 (age 75); Banma, District. Saharsa, (Bihar).
- Education: Diploma in Civil Engineering, I.A.
- Alma mater: Government Polytechnic, Saharsa & C.M. Science College, Madhepura, Bihar.
- Occupations: Engineer, Horticulturist, Social Worker & Politician.
- Years active: June 2024
- Political party: Janata Dal (Janata Dal (United)).
- Spouse: Mrs. Renu Sinha.
- Parent(s): Mr. Ramdhari Yadav (father) & Mrs. Sita Devi (mother).

Dinesh Chandra Yadav was a member of the 15th Lok Sabha of India from Khagaria and 17th Lok Sabha member from Madhepura as a member of JDU.

== Education and background ==
Yadav is an Engineer by education and holds Diploma in Civil Engineering.

== Posts held ==
#	From	To	Position
01	1990	1995	Member, Bihar Legislative Assembly from Simri Bakhtiarpur constituency
02	1991	1995	Deputy Chief Whip, Bihar Legislative Assembly
03	1990	1992	Member, Yachika Committee, Bihar Legislative Assembly
04	1992	1995	Member, Prasn and Dhyanakarshan Committee, Bihar Legislative Assembly
05	1996	1998	Elected to 11th Lok Sabha from Saharsa
06	1996	1998	Member, Committee on Estimates
07	1996	1998	Member, Committee on Communications
08	1996	1998	Member, Consultative Committee, Ministry of Railways
09	1996	1998	Member, Parliamentary Board, Janata Dal
10	1996	1998	Member, Koshi Division Transport Authority, Saharsa, Government of Bihar
11	1999	2004	Re-elected to 13th Lok Sabha (2nd term) from Saharsa
12	1999	2001	Member, Committee on External Affairs
13	2000	2002	Member, Committee on members of parliament Local Area Development Scheme
14	2000	2002	Member, Consultative Committee, Ministry of Railways
15	2001	2002	Member, Committee on Rural Development
16	2001	2004	Member, Committee on Public Undertaking
17	2002	2004	Member, Committee on Papers Laid on the Table
18	2003	2004	Member, Committee on Petroleum and Natural Gas
19	2003	2004	Member, Consultative Committee, Ministry of Surface Transport & Highways
20	2005	–	Member, Bihar Legislative Assembly (second term)
21	2005	2009	Member, Bihar Legislative Assembly (third term)
22	2005	2008	Member, Estimates Committee, Bihar Legislative Assembly
23	2008	2009	Minister, Industries, Government of Bihar
24	2009	2014	Re-elected to 15th Lok Sabha (3rd term) from Khagaria
25	2009	Date	Member, Committee on Home Affairs
26	2009	Date	Member, Consultative Committee, Ministry of Coal and Statistics & Programme Implementation
27	2009	Date	Member, Rajbhasha Committee
28	2009	Date	Member, Consultative Committee, Ministry of Railways
29	2015	2019	Member, Bihar Legislative Assembly (4th term) from Simri Bakhtiarpur constituency
30	2019	2024	Re-elected to 17th Lok Sabha (4th term) from Madhepura constituency
31	2024	Incumbent	Re-elected to 18th Lok Sabha (5th term) from Madhepura constituency

== See also ==
- List of members of the 15th Lok Sabha of India
