= Mahadalit =

Poorest social groups within the Dalits

Mahadalit is a term which was coined in 2007 by the government of Bihar for the poorest social groups within the Dalits. However, the term "Mahadalit" is not a part of the Indian constitutional terminology.

== Composition ==
The Nitish Kumar-led NDA government in Bihar set up the State Mahadalit Commission in 2007 to recommend inclusion of extremely weaker castes amongst the Scheduled Castes in the Mahadalit category. The commission has recognized Bihar's 21 Scheduled Castes out of the state's total 22 Scheduled Castes as the Mahadalits.

== Demographics and occupation ==
The Dalits form over 15% of the population of Bihar, and the Mahadalits form around 10% of the state's population. According to Mithilesh Kumar, the Mahadalits do not own land and work as sharecroppers on the farms of the Yadavs.

== Politics ==
During the election year of 2010, Nitish Kumar launched a slew of government schemes to woo mahadalit voters. Nitish said, "My aim is to see the social, economic and political growth of certain castes who need a special campaign for their overall development." The Mahadalit status entails benefits of over a dozen government welfare schemes including free land to the landless.
