= Romit Kumar =

Indian politician

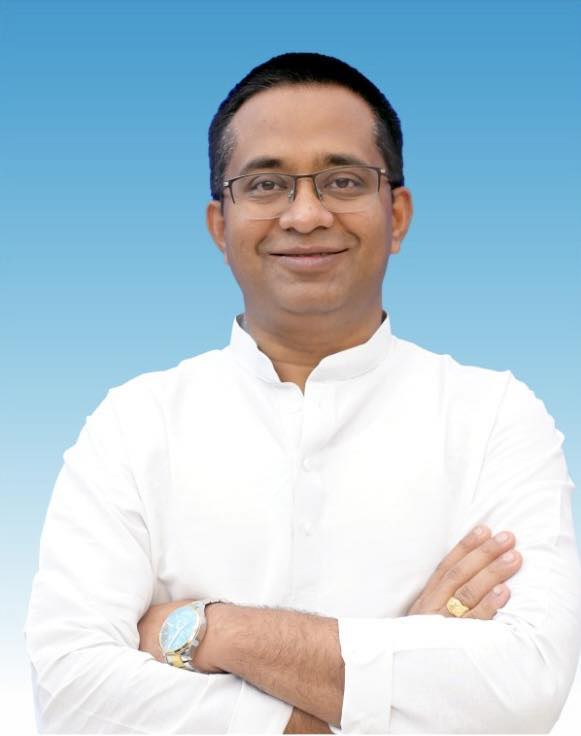
- Romit Kumar

Member of Bihar Legislative Assembly
- Incumbent
- Assumed office 14 November 2025
- Preceded by: Ajay Kumar Yadav
- Constituency: Atri

Personal details
- Party: Hindustani Awam Morcha (Secular)
- Parent(s): Arvind Kumar (Father) and Mina kumari (Mother)
- Education: B.tech (Electronics and Telecommunication)

Romit Kumar is an Indian politician belonging to the Hindustani Awam Morcha (Secular). He is currently a member of the Bihar Legislative Assembly from Atri Assembly constituency.

In the 2025 Bihar Legislative Assembly election, Romit Kumar defeated Baijayanti Devi by a margin of 25,777 votes from the Atri Assembly Constituency and was elected for the first time to the Bihar Legislative Assembly as a Member of the Hindustani Awam Morcha (Secular).
