= 2015 Bihar political crisis =

Political crisis in the India

- Part of Politics of Bihar
- Duration: February 4, 2015 – February 22, 2015
- Location: Bihar, India
- Type: political
- Cause: political crisis over the post of the Chief Minister of Bihar
- Outcome: State Chief Minister Jitan Ram Manjhi succeeded by Nitish Kumar

There was a political crisis in Bihar state of India during February 2015 over the post of the Chief Minister of Bihar. Incumbent Chief Minister Jitan Ram Manjhi did not vacate the post for former Chief Minister Nitish Kumar, who wanted to return, resulting in a split in the political party, JD(U). After days, the Governor asked Manjhi to prove majority in house by trust vote. Manjhi quit the post on day of vote and later Nitish Kumar took oath as chief minister again on 22 February 2015 ending the crisis.

== Background ==
Narendra Modi, then chief minister of Gujarat state, and Nitish Kumar, then chief minister of Bihar state of India had a political rivalry. Modi belonged to Bharatiya Janata Party (BJP) which was the largest party of National Democratic Alliance (NDA), then the chief opposition political group in Parliament of India. Nitish Kumar belonged to Janata Dal (United) (JD(U)), a smaller member party of NDA.

Before the 2014 general election, Narendra Modi was declared the prime ministerial candidate of NDA. Nitish-led JD(U) opposed the move and broke alliance and left NDA. When the alliance broke, the JD(U) government in Bihar survived by the outside support of other parties and independents.

=== 2014 general election ===
When results were announced on 16 May 2014, in Bihar, NDA won in 31 out of total 40 constituencies which include BJP in 22, Lok Janshakti Party (LJP) in 6, Rashtriya Lok Samata Party (RLSP) in 3. JD(U) won only two seats while United Progressive Alliance (UPA) won seven seats. These include 2 of Indian National Congress (INC), 4 of Rashtriya Janata Dal (RJD) and one of Nationalist Congress Party.

Nationally NDA secured absolute majority in the Parliament and formed the government with Narendra Modi as the Prime Minister of India.

== Crisis ==
Following poor performance of the JD(U) in election, Nitish Kumar resigned on 17 May 2014 as the chief minister of Bihar citing moral responsibility. His confidant and the then minister of the SC and ST welfare department of the state government, Jitan Ram Manjhi, took over as the chief minister of the state on 20 May 2014. Opposition leader Sushil Kumar Modi of the Bharatiya Janata Party called Manjhi a "dummy chief minister", to which Manjhi responded by saying he was "not a rubber stamp." Due to the breakup of the JD(U) alliance with BJP and the desertion of some JD(U) MLAs, Manjhi's government faced instability and appeared unlikely to pass the trust vote in the state legislative assembly. However RJD and INC provided outside support to Manjhi because he belongs to a backward caste.

The nine months rule of Jitan Ram Manjhi was marred by controversies. He made several provocative statements, like upper castes are foreigners, hoarding of food grains by small traders was okay. He questioned the character of wives of army personnel and migrant labour, saying they indulged in adultery while their husbands were away for work. He also said it was alright to consume alcohol before going to bed and admitted that he received kickbacks in bridge construction projects. On 9 February 2015, Manjhi was expelled from the party for intentionally courting controversies, due to his poor administrative skills and refusing to make way for Nitish Kumar to return as the Chief Minister. Manjhi recommended dissolution of the assembly but his cabinet did not pass the resolution. He requested the governor of Bihar Kesri Nath Tripathi to remove two cabinet ministers who accepted it. The dissolution was opposed by 21 cabinet ministers and supported by 7 ministers. Manjhi met Narendra Modi in Delhi. JD(U) called meeting of 97 MLAs of party and Nitish Kumar was elected as the leader of JD(U) state legislative party. He claimed to form the new government in the state and requested the governor to test the majority in the assembly. Patna High Court stayed the election of Nitish Kumar as the leader of JD(U) state legislative party. When not invited soon to prove the majority, Nitish Kumar paraded 128 MLAs in front of President of India, Pranab Mukherjee on 11 February 2015 in Delhi. JD(U) and its allies blamed the governor and BJP for political crisis in state but Union Parliamentary Affairs Minister M. Venkaiah Naidu denied the charge and said that the crisis arose over JD(U)'s internal issues. Manjhi included Dusadh caste in the Mahadalit category. Patna High Court stopped Manjhi cabinet taking any financial decisions until proven majority but later allowed it. Later JD(U) suspended seven ministers from the party who were supporting Manjhi. Total sixteen legislators, including Manjhi and ministers, were suspended from the party.

In the 243 member assembly, the JD(U) has 111 MLAs, BJP 87, RJD 24, INC 5 besides 5 Independents, while ten seats are vacant. The support of 117 MLAs needed to prove the majority in the assembly. Nitish Kumar claimed the support of 130 MLAs; 99 from JD(U), 24 from the RJD, 5 from INC, one from CPI(M) and one independent. Rajiv Ranjan, Manjhi appointed chief whip of JD(U), claimed support of 44 JD(U) and 12 RJD MLAs.

The governor asked Manjhi to seek vote of confidence on 20 February 2015, the first day of budget session of assembly. BJP announced it would support Manjhi. On 20 February 2015, Manjhi resigned from the post of chief minister in the morning before the vote. He said that the legislators who supported him were threatened with death and the speaker of assembly did not allow a secret ballot, so he chose to resign. The assembly was adjourned sine die. Later Nitish Kumar was invited by the Governor to form the government and he took oath on 22 February 2015 along with 22 other ministers.

== Aftermath ==
Few days later, Manjhi floated new political front, Hindustani Awam Morcha (HAM), on 28 February 2015 and clarified that the political party was not formed due to technical difficulties. He announced that he will travel across Bihar. Later Manjhi formed the political party, Hindustani Awam Morcha, out of the front and announced it on 8 May 2015.

In July 2015, the party joined National Democratic Alliance, an alliance led by BJP, and contested 21 seats, with some additional members contesting on BJP ticket, in 2015 Bihar Legislative Assembly election.

== See also ==
- 2015 Bihar Legislative Assembly election
- 2019 Maharashtra political crisis
- 2019 Karnataka political crisis
- 2024 Bihar political crisis
