= Hindustani Awam Morcha (Secular) =

- Abbreviation: HAM(S)
- President: Santosh Kumar Suman
- Lok Sabha Leader: Jitan Ram Manjhi
- Founder: Jitan Ram Manjhi
- Founded: 8 May 2015 (11 years ago)
- Split from: Janata Dal (United)
- Headquarters: 12, Strand Rd, Rajbansi Nagar, Patna, Bihar 800015
- Colours
- ECI Status: Bihar (State Party)
- Alliance: NDA (2015–2017; 2020–2022; 2023–present); UPA, I.N.D.I.A (2018–2020; 2022–23); MGB (Bihar) (2022–23)
- Seats in Lok Sabha: 1 / 543
- Seats in Bihar Legislative Council: 1 / 75
- Seats in Bihar Legislative Assembly: 5 / 243

Election symbol
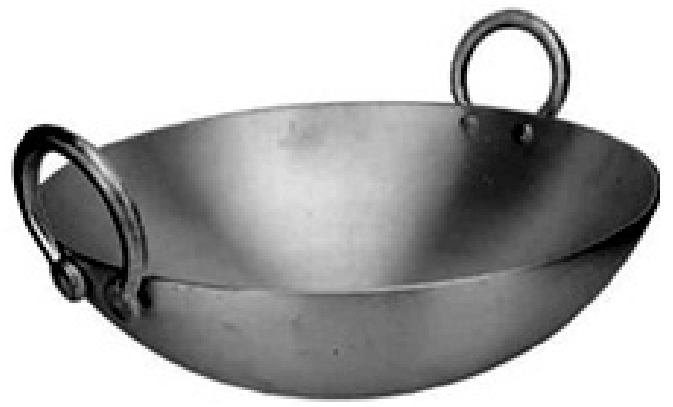

Party flag

Hindustani Awam Morcha (Secular) (English: Indian People's Front), abbreviated HAM(S), is an Indian political party with a presence in Bihar. In Bihar, this party is also a natural ally of the National Democratic Alliance (NDA), similar to the Janata Dal (United). It received a new election symbol, the wok, for the Bihar Assembly election in 2020.

== Formation ==
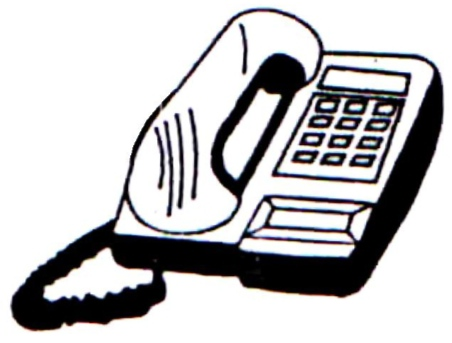
Telephone was the first election symbol used in 2015 and 2019 elections.

It was launched formally on 8 May 2015 by former Chief Minister of Bihar, Jitan Ram Manjhi, who left the Janata Dal (United) party along with 18 others to form Hindustani Awam Morcha following the 2015 Bihar political crisis. The party added "Secular" to its name in June 2015, becoming Hindustani Awam Morcha (Secular). In July 2015, the Election Commission recognised HAM(S) as a political party. The election symbol of the party is a wok.

== History ==
In July 2015, the party joined the National Democratic Alliance (NDA) and contested 21 seats, with some additional members contesting on the Bharatiya Janata Party (BJP) ticket in Bihar. On 18 September 2015, HAM(S) announced its first list of 13 candidates with Manjhi contesting from Makhdumpur and Imamganj.

The party ended up winning only in Imamganj with Manjhi losing in Makhdumpur.

In the 2015 Bihar Legislative Assembly election the alliance was led by the BJP alongside three smaller allies, namely the Lok Janshakti Party, the Rashtriya Lok Samta Party and HAM(S), while Janata Dal (United) had contested as part of the Mahagathbandan opposition party. In 2017, Janata Dal (United) switched allegiance, which caused the Mahagathbandan government to dissolve and the NDA to come into power. In 2018, HAM(S) and the Rashtriya Lok Samata Party left the alliance.

During the campaigning phase in August 2020, the alliance was re-joined National Democratic Alliance. The party won four seats in the 2020 Bihar Legislative Assembly election and Manjhi's son Santosh Suman was made a minister in Nitish Kumar's cabinet.

In the 2025 Bihar Legislative Assembly election, HAM (S) the contested in 6 seats as part of National Democratic Alliance. It won in 5 of these.

== Prominent members ==
- Jitan Ram Manjhi, founding member and former Chief Minister of Bihar, former Member of Legislative Assembly from Imamganj and Union Minister of Micro, Small and Medium Enterprises.
- Santosh Suman Manjhi, Minister of Irrigation and SC ST Welfare in the Government of Bihar, and Member of Legislative Council of Bihar.
- Ramesh Singh (National Vice President), Hindustan Awam Morcha, he is national vice president of Hindustan Awam Morcha since 2021

== Electoral performance ==
=== Lok Sabha elections ===
Indian General Elections (Bihar)
Election Year	Election	Alliance	Contested Seat	seat Won	Seats-/+	Total Votes	Votes %	Votes % -/+		
Indian General Election 2019
2019	17th Assembly	Mahagathbandhan	3	0 / 543	0	9,56,501	0.02%	New entry		
Indian General Election 2024		Mahagathbandhan								
2024	18th Assembly	Mahagathbandhan		NDA	1	1 / 543	▲1	4,94,960	2.3%	New entry

== List of Members of Parliament in Lok Sabha 2024 ==
Lok sabha (General) Election 2024
SL.No.	Name	Alliance	Constituency	Year	Portrait
1	Jitan Ram Manjhi; Union Minister of Micro, Small and Medium	NDA	Gaya (Bihar)	2024	

=== Bihar Assembly Election ===
Bihar Legislative Assembly
Election Year	Election	Alliance	Contested Seat	Seat won/Seats contested	Seats-/+	Total Votes	Votes %	Votes % -/+
2015	16th Assembly	National Democratic Alliance	21	1 / 21	▲1	8,64,856	2.3%	New entry
2020	17th Assembly	National Democratic Alliance	7	4 / 7	▲3	3,75,564	0.89%	▼1.41
2025	18th Assembly	National Democratic Alliance	6	5 / 6	▲1	5,87,056	1.17%	▲0.28

== List of Members of Legislative Council of Bihar ==
Bihar Legislative council Election 2024
SL.No.	Member	Alliance	Party	Term Start	Term end	Portrait
1	Santosh Suman	NDA	HAM	07-May-2024	06-May-2030	

== List of Members of Legislative Assembly in Bihar ==
Bihar assembly Election 2020
SL.No.	Name	Alliance	Constunsy	Year	Portrait
1	Jyoti Devi	NDA	Barachatti	2020	
2	Anil Kumar	NDA	Tikari	2020	
3	Prafull Kumar Singh	NDA	Sikandra	2020	
4	Deepa Manjhi	NDA	Imamganj	2024	

Bihar assembly Election 2025
SL.No.	Name	Alliance	Constunsy	Year	Portrait
1	Jyoti Devi	NDA	Barachatti	2025	
2	Romit Kumar	NDA	Attri	2025	
3	Prafull Kumar Singh	NDA	Sikandra	2025	
4	Deepa Manjhi	NDA	Imamganj	2025	
5	Lalan Ram	NDA	Kutumba	2025	

== See also ==
- List of political parties in India
- State Mahadalit Commission, Bihar
- Bhola Paswan Shastri
- Ram Sundar Das
- 2015 Bihar political crisis
- Bihar Legislative Assembly
- 2020 Bihar Legislative Assembly election
- 2025 Bihar Legislative Assembly election
