= Deepa Manjhi =

Indian politician

Member of Bihar Legislative Assembly
- Incumbent
- Assumed office 23 November 2024
- Chief Minister: Nitish Kumar
- Preceded by: Jitan Ram Manjhi
- Constituency: Imamganj

Personal details
- Party: Hindustani Awam Morcha (Secular)
- Spouse: Santosh Kumar Suman
- Relations: Jitan Ram Manjhi (father-in-law)

Deepa Kumari (born 1980) popularly known as Deepa Manjhi is an Indian politician. She is serving as the member of the Bihar Legislative Assembly from Imamganj Assembly constituency since 23 November 2023. She won on the symbol of Hindustani Awam Morcha (Secular), a party led by Jitan Ram Manjhi.

She is the first female Candidate elected from Imamganj Assembly Constituency. She is daughter-in-law of Jitan Ram Manjhi and wife of Santosh Kumar Suman.

== Career ==
She fought 2024 By-elections from Imamganj Assembly Constituency on the symbol of Hindustani Awam Morcha, a party under the coalition of National Democratic Alliance. She defeated Raushan Kumar Manjhi of Rashtriya Janata Dal and Jitendra Paswan of Jan Suraaj Party. Deepa Manjhi got 53435, while Raushan Kumar Manjhi got 47490 and Jitendra Paswan got 37103 votes.
