= Braj Nandan Yadav =

Indian politician

Member of Bihar Legislative Assembly
- In office 1990–1995
- Preceded by: Nitish Kumar
- Succeeded by: Nitish Kumar
- Constituency: Harnaut
- In office 1995–2000
- Preceded by: Ram Jaipal Singh Yadav
- Succeeded by: Vinod Yadav
- Constituency: Bakhtiarpur

Personal details
- Party: Janata Dal
- Parent: Amber Singh Yadav (Father)
- Education: Graduate,Maharaja College, Arrah, Magadh University
- Occupation: Politician social work farmer

Braj Nandan Yadav is an Indian politician who was elected as a member of Bihar Legislative Assembly from Harnaut constituency in 1990 as Independent candidate and in 1995 he won the Bakhtiarpur constituency as a member of Janata Dal.

== Political life ==
Yadav contested from Harnaut Assembly constituency in 2005 and 2015 but lost

== Ministry ==
Yadav serves as cabinet minister of Bihar under Rabri Devi government.

== See also ==
- Bakhtiarpur Assembly constituency
- Harnaut Assembly constituency
