= Atri Assembly constituency =

Assembly constituency in Bihar, India

Coordinates: 24.938°N 85.197°E

- Constituency No. 233 for the Bihar Legislative Assembly

Constituency details
- Country: India
- Region: East India
- State: Bihar
- District: Gaya
- Lok Sabha constituency: Jahanabad
- Established: 1951
- Total electors: 308,538

Member of Legislative Assembly
- 18th Bihar Legislative Assembly
- Incumbent Romit Kumar
- Party: HAM(S)
- Alliance: NDA
- Elected year: 2025
- Preceded by: Ajay Kumar Yadav

Atri Assembly constituency is an assembly constituency for Bihar Legislative Assembly in Gaya district of Bihar, India. It comes under Jahanabad (Lok Sabha constituency) Lok Sabha constituency along with other assembly constituencies viz. Arwal, Kurtha, Jehanabad, Makhdumpur, Ghoshi and Atri.

== Members of Legislative Assembly ==
Year	Member	Party
1952	Rameshwar Prasad Yadav	Independent
1957	Shivaratan Singh	Indian National Congress
1962	Shivaratan Singh	Indian National Congress
1967	Kishori Prasad	Independent
1969	Babu Lal Singh	Bharatiya Jana Sangh
1972	Maheshwari Prasad Singh	Independent
1977	Mundrika Singh	Janata Party
1980	Surendra Prasad	Indian National Congress (U)
1985	Ranjeet Singh	Indian National Congress
1990	Ranjeet Singh	Indian National Congress
1995	Rajendra Prasad Yadav	Janata Dal
2000	Rajendra Prasad Yadav	Rashtriya Janata Dal
2005	Rajendra Prasad Yadav	Rashtriya Janata Dal
2005	Kunti Devi Yadav	Rashtriya Janata Dal
2010	Krishna Nandan Yadav	Janata Dal (United)
2015	Kunti Devi Yadav	Rashtriya Janata Dal
2020	Ajay Kumar Yadav	Rashtriya Janata Dal
2025	Romit Kumar	Hindustani Awam Morcha

== Election Results ==
=== 2025 ===
2025 Bihar Legislative Assembly election: Atri
Party	Candidate	Votes	%	±%
HAM(S)	Romit Kumar	102,102	51.66	
RJD	Baijayanti Devi	76,325	38.62	+2.07
JSP	Shailendra Kumar	3,177	1.61	
BSP	Md. Vakil Varish	2,817	1.43	
Independent	Chandan	2,112	1.07	
NOTA	None of the above	3,516	1.78	−0.88
Majority		25,777	13.04	+8.42
Turnout		197,645	64.06	+8.84
HAM(S) gain from RJD		Swing		

=== 2020 ===
2020 Bihar Legislative Assembly election: Atri
Party	Candidate	Votes	%	±%
RJD	Ajay Kumar Yadav	62,658	36.55	−2.41
JD(U)	Manorama Devi	54,727	31.93	
LJP	Arvind Kumar Singh	25,873	15.09	−15.0
RLSP	Ajay Kumar Sinha	9,442	5.51	
Independent	Subhas Chandra Bose	3,036	1.77	
Independent	Manoj Yadav	2,651	1.55	
Independent	Ram Lakhan Yadav	2,307	1.35	
Independent	Chandrika Prasad	1,893	1.1	
Pragatisheel Magahi Samaj	Shashi Kumar	1,828	1.07	
NOTA	None of the above	4,561	2.66	−1.35
Majority		7,931	4.62	−4.25
Turnout		171,418	55.22	−0.21
RJD hold		Swing		

=== 2015 ===
2015 Bihar Legislative Assembly election: Atri
Party	Candidate	Votes	%	±%
RJD	Kunti Devi	60,687	38.96	
LJP	Arvind Kumar Singh	46,870	30.09	
JAP(L)	Krishna Nandan Yadav	9,603	6.17	
CPI	Sitaram Prasad Yadav	6,554	4.21	
Independent	Darvesh Singh	5,926	3.8	
Independent	Subhash Kumar Sinha	5,317	3.41	
Independent	Mundrika Singh Yadav	3,659	2.35	
Independent	Md. Sarwar Khan	2,660	1.71	
Independent	Jai Prakash Singh	1,718	1.1	
BSP	Sunil Kumar	1,663	1.07	
Independent	Ramcharitar Chohan	1,646	1.06	
NOTA	None of the above	6,239	4.01	
Majority		13,817	8.87	
Turnout		155,757	55.43	
