= Harnaut Assembly constituency =

Constituency of the Bihar legislative assembly in India

- Constituency No. 177 for the Bihar Legislative Assembly

Constituency details
- Country: India
- Region: East India
- State: Bihar
- District: Nalanda
- Established: 1972
- Total electors: 319,850

Member of Legislative Assembly
- 18th Bihar Legislative Assembly
- Incumbent Hari Narayan Singh
- Party: JD(U)
- Alliance: NDA
- Elected year: 2025

Harnaut is one of 243 constituencies of legislative assembly of Bihar. It is a part of Nalanda Lok Sabha constituency along with other assembly constituencies viz. Rajgir, Nalanda, Islampur, Hilsa, Asthawan and Biharsharif.

Bihar's Chief Minister Nitish Kumar has contested from this seat four times. He lost in 1977 as member of Janata Party, lost again in 1980 as member of Charan Singh's Janata Party (Secular) which changed its name later to Lok Dal, won in 1985 as member of Lok Dal, did not contest in 1990, and won in 1995 as member of Samata Party. He has never contested assembly election since, and has been elected to the upper house as MLC in 2006, 2012, and 2018. He has been elected to Lok Sabha 6 times.

== Overview ==
Harnaut comprises CD Blocks Harnaut, Chandi & Nagar Nausa.

== Members of the Legislative Assembly ==
Year	Member	Party
1977	Bhola Prasad Singh	Independent
1980	Arun Kumar Singh	Independent
1985	Nitish Kumar	Lokdal
1990	Braj Nandan Yadav	Independent
1995	Nitish Kumar	Samata Party
1996^	Arun Kumar Singh	Samata Party
2000	Vishwamohan Choudhary	Samata Party
2005	Er. Sunil Kumar	Janata Dal (United)
2005	Er. Sunil Kumar	Janata Dal (United)
2010	Hari Narayan Singh	Janata Dal (United)
2015	Hari Narayan Singh	Janata Dal (United)
2020	Hari Narayan Singh	Janata Dal (United)
2025	Hari Narayan Singh	Janata Dal (United)

== Election results ==
=== 2025 ===
2025 Bihar Legislative Assembly election: Harnaut
Party	Candidate	Votes	%	±%
JD(U)	Hari Narayan Singh	106,954	55.66	+14.42
INC	Arun Kumar	58,619	30.5	+17.17
JSP	Kamlesh Paswan	7,927	4.13	
Independent	Pintu Paswan	2,785	1.45	
AAP	Dharmendra Kumar	2,387	1.24	
Rashtriya Sanatan Party	Indrasen Priyadarshi	1,840	0.96	
Bhartiya Party (Loktantrik)	Kanhaiya Lal Yadav	1,782	0.93	
NOTA	None of the above	5,380	2.8	+1.98
Majority		48,335	25.16	+7.98
Turnout		192,162	60.08	+8.61
JD(U) hold		Swing		

=== 2020 ===
2020 Bihar Legislative Assembly election: Harnaut
Party	Candidate	Votes	%	±%
JD(U)	Hari Narayan Singh	65,404	41.24	▼4.67
LJP	Mamta Devi	38,163	24.06	▼12.72
INC	Kundan Gupta	21,144	13.33	
BSP	Kaushlendra Kumar Singh	6,846	4.32	▲3.07
Independent	Ashok Kumar Singh	2,980	1.88	
JAP(L)	Sanjay Singh	2,420	1.53	▼0.47
Rashtriya Jan Jan Party	Karuna Kumari	2,250	1.42	
Proutist Bloc	Ashutosh Kumar Sinha	1,844	1.16	
Pragatisheel Magahi Samaj	Vijay Kumar	1,800	1.13	▲0.78
Purvanchal Mahapanchayat	Rekha Kumari	1,780	1.12	
Independent	Mukesh Kumar	1,607	1.01	
Independent	Jagatnarayan	1,528	0.96	
NOTA	None of the above	1,299	0.82	▼2.7
Majority		27,241	17.18	▲8.05
Turnout		158,608	51.47	▼2.95
JD(U) hold		Swing		

=== 2015 ===
Bihar Assembly election, 2015: Harnaut
Party	Candidate	Votes	%	±%
JD(U)	Hari Narayan Singh	71,933	45.91	
LJP	Arun Kumar	57,638	36.78	
Independent	Dharmendra Kumar	4,146	2.65	
JAP(L)	Brij Nandan Yadav	3,128	2.0	
NCP	Neelam Kumari Singh	2,858	1.82	
Independent	Santosh Kumar	2,093	1.34	
BSP	Sitaram Paswan	1,959	1.25	
Independent	Pintu Kumar	1,692	1.08	
Independent	Chandra Uday Kumar	1,450	0.93	
NOTA	None of the above	5,523	3.52	
Majority		14,295	9.13	
Turnout		156,695	54.42	

=== 2010 ===
Bihar assembly elections, 2010: Harnaut
Party	Candidate	Votes	%	±%
JD(U)	Harinarayan Singh	56827	47.31	
LJP	Arun Kumar	41785	34.79	
