= Rajendra Prasad Yadav (Atri politician) =

Indian politician

Member of the Bihar Legislative Assembly
- In office 1995–2005
- Preceded by: Ranjeet Signh
- Succeeded by: Kunti Devi Yadav
- Constituency: Atri

Personal details
- Party: Rashtriya Janata Dal; Janata Dal
- Parent(s): Ajay Kumar Yadav (Son); Kunti Devi Yadav (Wife)
- Occupation: Politician social work

Rajendra Prasad Yadav was an Indian politician who was elected as a member of Bihar Legislative Assembly from Atri constituency in 2005 and 2015 as the candidate of Rashtriya Janata Dal.

== Political life ==
Yadav was won Atri constituency thrice as a member of Janata Dal and Rashtriya Janata Dal in 1995 to 2005.

== Legacy ==
- His son Ajay Kumar Yadav former member of the Bihar Legislative Assembly from Atri constituency.
- His wife Kunti Devi Yadav former member of the Bihar Legislative Assembly from Atri constituency.

== See also ==
- Atri Assembly constituency
