= Ranvijay Singh Yadav =

Indian politician

Member of Bihar Legislative Assembly
- In office 2015–2020
- Preceded by: Aniruddh Kumar Yadav
- Succeeded by: Aniruddh Kumar Yadav
- Constituency: Bakhtiarpur

Personal details
- Born: 1 March 1977 (age 49) Teka Bigha, Patna, India
- Party: Bharatiya Janata Party
- Other political affiliations: Rashtriya Janata Dal
- Education: Intermediate
- Profession: Politician

Ranvijay Singh Yadav is an Indian politician. He was elected to the Bihar Legislative Assembly from Bakhtiarpur (Vidhan Sabha constituency) as the 2015 Member of Bihar Legislative Assembly as a member of the Bharatiya Janata Party.
