= Hari Narayan Singh (Bihar politician) =

Indian politician (born 1973)

Member of Bihar Legislative Assembly
- Incumbent
- Assumed office 2010
- Preceded by: Er.sunil kumar
- Constituency: Harnaut

Personal details
- Party: Janata Dal (United)

Hari Narayan Singh is an Indian politician and ten times Member of Bihar Legislative Assembly, the incumbent member of the Bihar Legislative Assembly from Harnaut Assembly constituency seat.
