= Ram Jaipal Singh Yadav =

Indian politician

3rd Deputy Chief Minister of Bihar
- In office 2 June 1971 – 9 January 1972
- Chief Minister: Bhola Paswan Shastri
- Preceded by: Karpoori Thakur
- Succeeded by: Sushil Kumar Modi

Member of the Bihar Legislative Assembly
- In office 1981–1995
- Preceded by: Ram Lakhan Singh Yadav
- Succeeded by: Brajnandan Yadav
- Constituency: Bakhtiarpur
- In office 1967–1977
- Preceded by: Sheo Bachan Singh
- Succeeded by: Lalu Prasad Yadav
- Constituency: Sonpur

Personal details
- Born: Saran district, Bihar, British India
- Died: Patna, India
- Party: Indian National Congress
- Occupation: Politician
- Website: www.ramjaipalcollege.org

Ram Jaipal Singh Yadav was an Indian politician and former Deputy Chief Minister of Bihar state. He was a seven-time member of Bihar Legislative Assembly from Garkha, Sonpur and Bakhtiarpur constituencies.

== Early life and family ==
Ram Jaipal Singh Yadav was born in Saran district, Bihar, British India.

== Political career ==
Ram Jaipal Singh Yadav first assembly election elected as PSP candidate in 1957 from Garkha Legislative Assembly.

Yadav was elected Member of Bihar Legislative Assembly from Sonpur constituency from 1967 to 1977 and from 1981 to 1995 from Bakhtiarpur as a member of Indian National Congress.

=== Electoral record ===
In 1977 Devendra Prasad Yadav resigned from the Bihar Vidhan Sabha and paved the way for Karpoori Thakur to contest the Phulparas constituency by-election. Thakur won by the margin of 65000 votes, defeating Ram Jaipal Singh Yadav of Indian National Congress.

== In Memory ==
- Ram Jaipal Singh Yadav College established on 5 July 1971 is one of the leading institutions of higher learning and is a constituent to the Jai Prakash University, Chapra Bihar.
