= Kunti Devi =

Indian politician

Kunti Devi Yadav

Member of the Bihar Legislative Assembly
- In office 2005–2010
- Preceded by: Rajendra Prasad Yadav
- Succeeded by: Krishna Nandan Yadav
- Constituency: Atri

Personal details
- Party: Rashtriya Janata Dal
- Relations: Rajendra Prasad Yadav(Husband); Ajay Kumar Yadav (Son)
- Occupation: Politician; Social work

Kunti Devi Yadav (born 1963) was an Indian politician from Bihar. She was a former two time MLA from Atri Assembly constituency in Gaya district representing Rashtriya Janata Dal.

== Early life and education ==
Devi is from Atri, Gaya district, Bihar. She married Rajendra Prasad Yadav and together they have a son, Ajay Kumar Yadav.

== Career ==
Devi won from Atri Assembly constituency in the 2015 Bihar Legislative Assembly election representing Rashtriya Janata Dal. She polled 60,687 votes and defeated her nearest rival, Arvind Kumar Singh of the LJP by a margin of 13,817 votes. She first became an MLA winning the October 2005 Bihar Legislative Assembly election.

== Legacy ==
- Her son Ajay Kumar Yadav currently member of the Bihar Legislative Assembly from Atri constituency.

== See also ==
- Atri Assembly constituency
