= 2024 Bihar political crisis =

2024 political conflict in India

- Part of Politics of Bihar
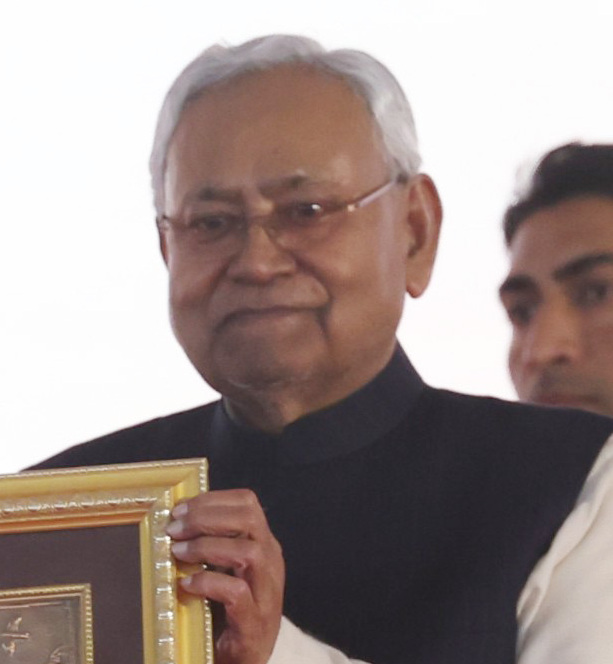
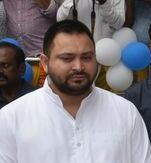
- Nitish Kumar, Tejashwi Yadav
- Date: 28 January 2024
- Location: Patna, Bihar
- Outcome: Samrat Choudhary & Vijay Kumar Sinha take oath as Deputy Chief Minister of Bihar

In January 2024, the Indian politician and eight-time Chief Minister of Bihar, Nitish Kumar, of the Mahagathbandhan block resigned amid rumors of him joining the opposition, the Bharatiya Janata Party-led National Democratic Alliance (NDA). He joined the NDA and took the oath for his ninth term as Chief Minister of Bihar. Samrat Chaudhary and Vijay Kumar Sinha became Deputy Chief Ministers .

== Reason ==
Nitish Kumar left the Indian National Developmental Inclusive Alliance (INDIA) and rejoined the BJP-led National Democratic Alliance (NDA) in Bihar, citing internal issues within the opposition alliance. Allegations against the Congress for attempting to capture INDIA leadership, disagreements over leadership positions, and delays in seat-sharing talks were factors influencing Kumar's decision.

== See also ==
- 2015 Bihar political crisis
