= Bakhtiarpur Assembly constituency =

Assembly constituency in Bihar, India

Coordinates: 25.4667°N 85.5167°E

Bakhtiarpur
- Constituency No. - for the Bihar Legislative Assembly

Constituency details
- Country: India
- Region: East India
- State: Bihar
- Established: 1951
- Total electors: 298,087

Member of Legislative Assembly
- 18th Bihar Legislative Assembly
- Incumbent Arun Kumar
- Party: LJP(RV)
- Alliance: NDA
- Elected year: 2025

Bakhtiarpur Assembly constituency is one of 243 constituencies of legislative assembly of Bihar. It comes under Patna Sahib Lok Sabha constituency along with other assembly constituencies viz.

== Overview ==
Bakhtiarpur comprises CD Blocks Daniawan, Khusrupur & Bakhtiarpur.

== Members of the Legislative Assembly ==
Year	Name	Party
1952	Sundri Devi	Indian National Congress
1957	Mohammed Salahuddin	Indian National Congress
1962	Ram Yatan Singh	Indian National Congress
1967	Dharambir Singh	Indian National Congress
1969	Dharambir Singh	Indian National Congress
1972	Bhola Prasad Singh	Samyukta Socialist Party
1977	Bhudeo Singh	Indian National Congress
1980	Ram Lakhan Singh Yadav	Indian National Congress (U)
1981^	Ram Jaipal Singh Yadav	Indian National Congress (I)
1985	Ram Jaipal Singh Yadav	Indian National Congress
1990	Ram Jaipal Singh Yadav	Indian National Congress
1995	Braj Nandan Yadav	Janata Dal
2000	Vinod Yadav	Bharatiya Janata Party
2005	Aniruddh Kumar Yadav	Rashtriya Janata Dal
2005	Vinod Yadav	Bharatiya Janata Party
2010	Aniruddh Kumar Yadav	Rashtriya Janata Dal
2015	Ranvijay Singh Yadav	Bharatiya Janata Party
2020	Aniruddh Kumar Yadav	Rashtriya Janata Dal
2025	Arun Kumar	Lok Janshakti Party (Ram Vilas)

== Election results ==
=== 2025 ===
2025 Bihar Legislative Assembly election: Bakhtiarpur
Party	Candidate	Votes	%	±%
LJP(RV)	Arun Kumar	88,520	45.14	
RJD	Aniruddh Kumar Yadav	87,539	44.64	−7.53
JSP	Balmiki Singh	6,581	3.36	
BSP	Deepak Bhai Patel	2,923	1.49	
Independent	Shambhu Singh	2,876	1.47	
NOTA	None of the above	3,635	1.85	−0.33
Majority		981	0.5	−11.55
Turnout		196,100	65.79	+5.44
LJP(RV) gain from RJD		Swing		

=== 2020 ===
Bihar Assembly election, 2020: Bakhtiarpur
Party	Candidate	Votes	%	±%
RJD	Aniruddh Kumar Yadav	89,483	52.17	+17.22
BJP	Ranvijay Singh	68,811	40.12	+0.01
RLSP	Vinod Yadav	1,893	1.1	
Independent	Sita Devi	1,878	1.09	−0.25
NOTA	None of the above	3,744	2.18	−0.24
Majority		20,672	12.05	+6.89
Turnout		171,515	60.35	+0.75
RJD gain from BJP		Swing		

=== 2015 ===
Bihar Legislative Assembly election, 2015: Bakhtiarpur
Party	Candidate	Votes	%	±%
BJP	Ranvijay Singh	61,496	40.11	
RJD	Aniruddh Kumar	53,594	34.95	
BSP	Akhilesh Kumar	12,070	7.87	
Independent	Jitendra Yadav	11,123	7.25	
CPI	Surendra Paswan	2,791	1.82	
Independent	Ravi Kumar	2,193	1.43	
Independent	Sita Devi	2,050	1.34	
Independent	Ranjit Kumar	1,755	1.14	
NOTA	None of the above	3,711	2.42	
Majority		7,902	5.16	
Turnout		153,324	59.6	
BJP gain from RJD		Swing		

=== 2010 ===
Bihar Assembly election, 2010: Bakhtiarpur
Party	Candidate	Votes	%	±%
RJD	Aniruddh Kumar	52,782	46.60	
BJP	Vinod Yadav	38,037	33.58	
BSP	Subodh Kumar	7,834	6.92	
Independent	Shashi Yadav	3,384	2.99	
CPI	Brij Nandan Singh	3,250	2.87	
Majority		14,745	13.02	
Turnout		113,274	55.87	
RJD gain from BJP		Swing		

=== 2005 ===
Bihar Legislative Assembly Election, October 2005: Bakhtiarpur
Party	Candidate	Votes	%	±%
BJP	Vinod Yadav	35,774	40.23	
RJD	Aniruddh Kumar	32,719	36.79	
LJP	Lal Krishna Yadav	9,718	10.92	
BSP	Pramod Kumar Nirala	3,762	4.23	
Independent	Mohammad Sarfaraj Ahmad	2,936	3.30	
Majority		3,055	3.44	
Turnout		88,912	41.05	
BJP hold		Swing		

== See also ==
- List of Assembly constituencies of Bihar
- Bakhtiarpur
