= Manorama Devi =

Indian politician

Member of Bihar Legislative Assembly
- Incumbent
- Assumed office 13 November 2024
- Preceded by: Surendra Prasad Yadav
- Constituency: Belaganj

Member of the Bihar Legislative Council
- In office 2015–2021
- Constituency: Jehanabad & Arwal

Personal details
- Born: Gaya, Bihar, India
- Party: Janata Dal (United)
- Spouse: Bindeshwari Prasad Yadav (Husband)
- Children: Rocky Yadav

Manorama Devi is an Indian politician from Bihar. She served as a member of the Bihar Legislative Council from Gaya-Jehanabad-Arwal LA for two terms.

== Personal life ==
Devi is born in Gaya, Bihar. Her husband Bindeshwari Prasad Yadav died on 23 July 2020 due to heart attack in AIIMS at Patna. She completed her M.A. in 1997 and B.A. in 1994 at MU Bodhgaya. She completed her intermediate in 1991.

She was arrested by the Police in May 2016 for an alleged crime.

== Career ==
Devi served as a member of the Bihar Legislative Council from Gaya-Jehanabad-Arwal LA from 2003 to 2009 as an independent, and for a second term from 2015 to 2021 representing Janata Dal (United). She contested the 2020 Bihar Legislative Assembly election from Atri Assembly constituency in Gaya district but lost on Janata Dal (United) ticket. She was defeated by Ajay Kumar Yadav of RJD by a margin of 7,931 votes.

In 2024, she was made the candidate of Janata Dal (United) for the bypolls conducted on the Belaganj Assembly constituency of Jahanabad district. This seat was earlier held by Surendra Prasad Yadav, whose election to Lok Sabha made the seat vacant. In this election, she contested against Rashtriya Janata Dal leader and son of Surendra Prasad Yadav, Vishwanath Kumar Singh and won with a margin of 21391 votes.
