= Krishna Nandan Yadav =

Indian politician

Member of the Bihar Legislative Assembly
- In office 2010–2015
- Preceded by: Kunti Devi Yadav
- Succeeded by: Kunti Devi Yadav
- Constituency: Atri

Personal details
- Party: Janata Dal (United)
- Education: M.A. (1981) and Ph.D. (1995) From Magadh University Bodhgaya
- Occupation: Politician; Social work

Krishna Nandan Yadav is an Indian politician from Bihar. He was an MLA from Atri Assembly constituency in Gaya district representing Janata Dal (United).
