= Rameshwar Prasad Yadav =

Indian politician

Member of the Bihar Legislative Assembly
- In office 1951–1957
- Preceded by: Position established
- Succeeded by: Shivaratan Singh
- Constituency: Atri

Personal details
- Born: Gaya, Bengal Presidency
- Died: Gaya, Bihar
- Party: Independent
- Occupation: Politician

Rameshwar Prasad Yadav was an Indian politician.He was elected as a member of Bihar Legislative Assembly from Atri constituency, Bihar.
