= Aniruddh Kumar Yadav =

Indian politician

Member of Bihar Legislative Assembly
- In office 2020–2025
- Preceded by: Ranvijay Singh Yadav
- Succeeded by: Arun Kumar
- Constituency: Bakhtiarpur

Member of Bihar Legislative Assembly
- In office 2010–2015
- Preceded by: Vinod Yadav
- Succeeded by: Ranvijay Singh Yadav
- Constituency: Bakhtiarpur

Personal details
- Born: Vill.Hidayatpur, Post-Manjholi, Patna, Bihar
- Party: Rashtriya Janata Dal
- Profession: Politician

Aniruddh Kumar Yadav is an Indian politician. He was elected to the Bihar Legislative Assembly from Bakhtiarpur as the 2010 Member of Bihar Legislative Assembly as a member of the Rashtriya Janata Dal.
