= Imamganj Assembly constituency =

Assembly constituency in Bihar, India

Coordinates: 24.46°N 84.58°E

- Constituency No. 227 for the Bihar Legislative Assembly

Constituency details
- Country: India
- Region: East India
- State: Bihar
- District: Gaya
- Lok Sabha constituency: Aurangabad
- Established: 1957
- Total electors: 304,475

Member of Legislative Assembly
- 18th Bihar Legislative Assembly
- Incumbent Deepa Manjhi
- Party: HAM(S)
- Alliance: NDA
- Elected year: 2025

Imamganj is an assembly constituency for Bihar Legislative Assembly in Gaya district of Bihar, India. It comes under Aurangabad (Bihar Lok Sabha constituency).

== Members of the legislative assembly ==
Year	Member	Party
1957	Ambika Prasad Singh	Independent politician
1962	Ambika Prasad Singh	Swatantra Party
1967	D Ram	Indian National Congress
1969	Ishwar Das	Samyukta Socialist Party
1972	Awadheshewar Ram	Indian National Congress
1977	Ishwar Das	Janata Party
1980	Shrichand Singh	Indian National Congress
1985	Shrichand Singh	Indian National Congress
1990	Uday Narayan Chaudhary	Janata Dal
1995	Ramswaroop Paswan	Samata Party
2000	Uday Narayan Chaudhary	Samata Party
2005	Uday Narayan Chaudhary	Janata Dal (United)
2005	Uday Narayan Chaudhary	Janata Dal (United)
2010	Uday Narayan Chaudhary	Janata Dal (United)
2015	Jitan Ram Manjhi	Hindustani Awam Morcha
2020	Jitan Ram Manjhi	Hindustani Awam Morcha
2024^	Deepa Manjhi	Hindustani Awam Morcha
2025	Deepa Manjhi	Hindustani Awam Morcha

^By-poll

== Election results ==
=== 2025 ===
2025 Bihar Legislative Assembly election: Imamganj
Party	Candidate	Votes	%	±%
HAM(S)	Deepa Manjhi	104,861	50.83	+5.47
RJD	Ritu Priya Chaudhary	79,005	38.3	+2.18
JSP	Ajeet Kumar	11,912	5.77	
Independent	Tengar Paswan	2,313	1.12	
Peoples Party of India (Democratic)	Banarsi Das	2,049	0.99	
NOTA	None of the above	3,596	1.74	−0.97
Majority		25,856	12.53	+3.29
Turnout		206,281	67.75	+9.06
HAM(S) hold		Swing		

=== 2024 ===
Bihar Legislative Assembly by-election 2024: Imamganj
Party	Candidate	Votes	%	±%
HAM(S)	Deepa Manjhi	53,435	32.59	−12.77
RJD	Roshan Kumar Manjhi	47,490	28.96	−7.16
JSP	Jitendra Paswan	37,103	22.63	
Majority		5,945	3.63	
Turnout		1,63,963		
HAM(S) hold		Swing		

=== 2020 ===
2020 Bihar Legislative Assembly election: Imamganj
Party	Candidate	Votes	%	±%
HAM(S)	Jitan Ram Manjhi	78,762	45.36	−7.5
RJD	Uday Narayan Choudhary	62,728	36.12	
LJP	Shobha Sinha	14,197	8.18	
JAP(L)	Fakirchand Das	3,797	2.19	
RLSP	Jitendra Kumar Paswan	2,337	1.35	
Jagrook Janta Party	Jitendra Chaudhari	2,033	1.17	
Independent	Bijendra Paswan	1,579	0.91	
NOTA	None of the above	4,705	2.71	−0.99
Majority		16,034	9.24	−10.34
Turnout		173,645	58.69	+2.42
HAM(S) hold		Swing		

=== 2015 ===
2015 Bihar Legislative Assembly election: Imamganj
Party	Candidate	Votes	%	±%
HAM(S)	Jitan Ram Manjhi	79,389	52.86	
JD(U)	Uday Narain Choudhary	49,981	33.28	
Shoshit Samaj Dal	Raghuni Ram Shastri	4,297	2.86	
Sarvajan Kalyan Loktantrik Party	Lalan Kumar	3,624	2.41	
BSP	Mathura Paswan	2,732	1.82	
Aap Aur Hum Party	Ram Khelawan Chaudhry	2,491	1.66	
CPI(ML)L	Shankar Paswan	2,109	1.4	
NOTA	None of the above	5,552	3.7	
Majority		29,408	19.58	
Turnout		150,175	56.27	
