= Ajay Kumar Yadav =

Indian politician (born 1985)

Member of the Bihar Legislative Assembly
- In office 2020–2025
- Preceded by: Kunti Devi Yadav
- Succeeded by: Romit Kumar
- Constituency: Atri

Personal details
- Born: 21 October 1985 (age 40)
- Party: Rashtriya Janata Dal
- Parent: Kunti Devi Yadav (Mother) Rajendra Prasad Yadav (Father)
- Education: 12th Pass from BSEB
- Occupation: Politician social work

Ajay Kumar Yadav (born 1985) is an Indian politician from Bihar. He has served as MLA from Atri Assembly constituency in Gaya district from 2020 to 2025, representing Rashtriya Janata Dal. He won the 2020 Bihar Legislative Assembly election.

== Early life and education ==
Yadav is from Atri, Gaya district. He runs his own milk business. He completed his intermediate in 2002. His mother, Kunti Yadav, served as an MLA from Atri constituency two times.

== Career ==
Yadav won the 2020 Bihar Legislative Assembly election from Atri Assembly constituency representing Rashtriya Janata Dal. He polled 62,658 votes and defeated his nearest rival, Manorama Devi of JD(U), by a margin of 7,931 votes.

== See also ==
- Atri Assembly constituency
