= Rajiv Ranjan =

Former Indian politician

Rajiv Ranjan was an Indian politician and former member of the Bihar Legislative Assembly representing the Islampur constituency. He served as a member of the Janata Dal (United).

== Political career ==
Ranjan was elected to the Bihar Legislative Assembly from the Islampur constituency in the 2010 Bihar Legislative Assembly election. He served until 2015, when he was succeeded by Chandrasen Prasad.

He was associated with the Janata Dal (United) and was at one point suspended from the party.

== Death ==
Ranjan died in 2024 following a heart attack.
