= State Mahadalit Commission =

Mahadalit Commission in Bihar

State Mahadalit Commission is a government body set up by the Government of Bihar to identify the castes within Scheduled Castes who lagged behind in the development process and to study educational and social status and to suggest measures for their upliftment. The commission was set up in 2007. The commission has submitted two interim reports. The commission has recommended to include 18 castes as the extremely weaker castes amongst the list of Scheduled Castes. Later it has also recommended ‘Chamar’ caste to be included in Mahadalit category.
