= Nitish Kumar =

Indian politician (born 1951)

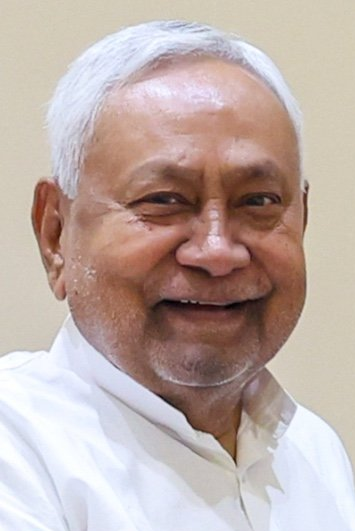
- Kumar in 2026

Member of Parliament, Rajya Sabha
- Incumbent
- Assumed office 10 April 2026
- Preceded by: Harivansh Narayan Singh
- Constituency: Bihar

22nd Chief Minister of Bihar
- In office 22 February 2015 – 15 April 2026
- Governor: Ram Nath Kovind; Satya Pal Malik; Lalji Tandon; Phagu Chauhan; Rajendra Arlekar; Arif Mohammed Khan; Syed Ata Hasnain
- Deputy: Tejashwi Yadav; Sushil Kumar Modi; Tarkishore Prasad; Renu Devi; Samrat Choudhary; Vijay Kumar Sinha
- Preceded by: Jitan Ram Manjhi
- Succeeded by: Samrat Choudhary
- In office 24 November 2005 – 20 May 2014
- Governor: Buta Singh; R. S. Gavai; R. L. Bhatia; Devanand Konwar; D. Y. Patil
- Deputy: Sushil Kumar Modi (until 2013)
- Preceded by: President's rule
- Succeeded by: Jitan Ram Manjhi
- In office 3 March 2000 – 10 March 2000
- Governor: V. C. Pande
- Preceded by: Rabri Devi
- Succeeded by: Rabri Devi

27th Union Minister of Railways
- In office 20 March 2001 – 21 May 2004
- President: K. R. Narayanan; A. P. J. Abdul Kalam
- Prime Minister: Atal Bihari Vajpayee
- Preceded by: Mamata Banerjee
- Succeeded by: Lalu Prasad Yadav
- In office 19 March 1998 – 5 August 1999
- President: K. R. Narayanan
- Prime Minister: Atal Bihari Vajpayee
- Preceded by: Ram Vilas Paswan
- Succeeded by: Mamata Banerjee

24th Union Minister of Agriculture
- In office 27 May 2000 – 21 July 2001
- President: K. R. Narayanan
- Prime Minister: Atal Bihari Vajpayee
- Preceded by: Sunder Lal Patwa
- Succeeded by: Ajit Singh
- In office 22 November 1999 – 3 March 2000
- President: K. R. Narayanan
- Prime Minister: Atal Bihari Vajpayee
- Preceded by: Atal Bihari Vajpayee
- Succeeded by: Sunder Lal Patwa

11th Union Minister of Surface Transport
- In office 13 October 1999 – 22 November 1999
- President: K. R. Narayanan
- Prime Minister: Atal Bihari Vajpayee
- Preceded by: M. Thambidurai
- Succeeded by: Jaswant Singh
- In office 14 April 1998 – 5 August 1999
- President: K. R. Narayanan
- Prime Minister: Atal Bihari Vajpayee
- Preceded by: Jaswant Singh
- Succeeded by: Rajnath Singh

24th Union Minister of State for Agriculture
- In office 23 April 1990 – 10 November 1990
- Minister: Devi Lal; V. P. Singh
- Preceded by: Janardhana Poojary
- Succeeded by: Upendra Nath Verma
Parliamentary offices
Member of Bihar Legislative Council
In office 7 May 2006 – 30 March 2026
Succeeded by	TBD
Constituency	Elected by the MLAs
Member of Parliament, Lok Sabha
In office 13 May 2004 – 25 November 2005
Preceded by	George Fernandes
Succeeded by	Ram Swaroop Prasad
Constituency	Nalanda, Bihar
In office 28 November 1989 – 21 May 2004
Preceded by	Prakash Chandra Yadav
Succeeded by	Vijay Krishna
Constituency	Barh, Bihar
Member of Bihar Legislative Assembly
In office 1995–1996
Preceded by	Braj Nandan Yadav
Succeeded by	Arun Kumar Singh
Constituency	Harnaut
In office 1985–1990
Preceded by	Arun Kumar Singh
Succeeded by	Braj Nandan Yadav
Constituency	Harnaut
Party political offices
National President of Janata Dal (United)
Incumbent
Assumed office 29 December 2023
Preceded by	Lalan Singh
In office 10 April 2016 – 27 December 2020
Preceded by	Sharad Yadav
Succeeded by	RCP Singh

Personal details
- Born: 1 March 1951 (age 75) Bakhtiarpur, Bihar, India
- Party: Janata Dal (United) (since 2005)
- Other political affiliations: National Democratic Alliance (since 2024; 2017–2022; 1999–2013); Indian National Developmental Inclusive Alliance (2023–2024); United Progressive Alliance (2022–2023; 2015–2017); Samata Party (until 2005); Janata Dal (1989–1994)
- Spouse: Manju Sinha (m. 1973; died 2007)
- Children: Nishant Kumar (son)
- Education: National Institute of Technology, Patna (B.E)

Nitish Kumar (born 1 March 1951) is an Indian politician from Bihar. He is currently serving as a Member of Parliament in the Rajya Sabha. The national president of the Janata Dal (United), he was the longest serving Chief Minister of Bihar, serving briefly in 2000, from 2005 to 2014, and again from 2015 to 2026.

Kumar first entered politics as a member of the Janata Dal, becoming an MLA in 1985. A socialist, Kumar founded the Samata Party in 1994 along with George Fernandes. In 1996, he was elected to the Lok Sabha, and served as a Union Minister in the government of Atal Bihari Vajpayee, with his party joining the National Democratic Alliance (NDA). In 2003, his party merged into the Janata Dal (United), and Kumar became its leader. In 2005, the NDA won a majority in the Bihar Legislative Assembly, and Kumar became chief minister heading a coalition with the Bharatiya Janata Party (BJP).

In the 2010 state election, the governing coalition won re-election in a landslide. In June 2013, Kumar broke with the BJP after Narendra Modi was named as their candidate for prime minister, and formed the Mahagathbandhan, a coalition with the Rashtriya Janata Dal (RJD) and Indian National Congress (INC) and joined in United Progressive Alliance (UPA). On 17 May 2014, Kumar resigned as chief minister after the party suffered severe losses in the 2014 general election, and was replaced by Jitan Ram Manjhi. However, he attempted to return as chief minister in February 2015, sparking a political crisis that eventually saw Manjhi resign and Kumar become chief minister again. Later that year, the Mahagathbandhan won a large majority in the state election. In 2017, Kumar broke with the RJD over corruption allegations and returned to the NDA, leading another coalition with the BJP; at the 2020 state election his government was narrowly reelected. In August 2022, Kumar left the NDA, rejoining the Mahagathbandhan; he would also become a founding member of the Indian National Developmental Inclusive Alliance. In January 2024, Kumar again left the Mahagathbandhan and rejoined the NDA, with the government winning the 2025 state election in a landslide. In March 2026, Kumar announced his pending resignation as chief minister and intention to contest the 2026 Rajya Sabha elections, which he won. And finally on 10 April 2026, he was sworn in as the Member of Parliament, Rajya Sabha.

== Early life ==
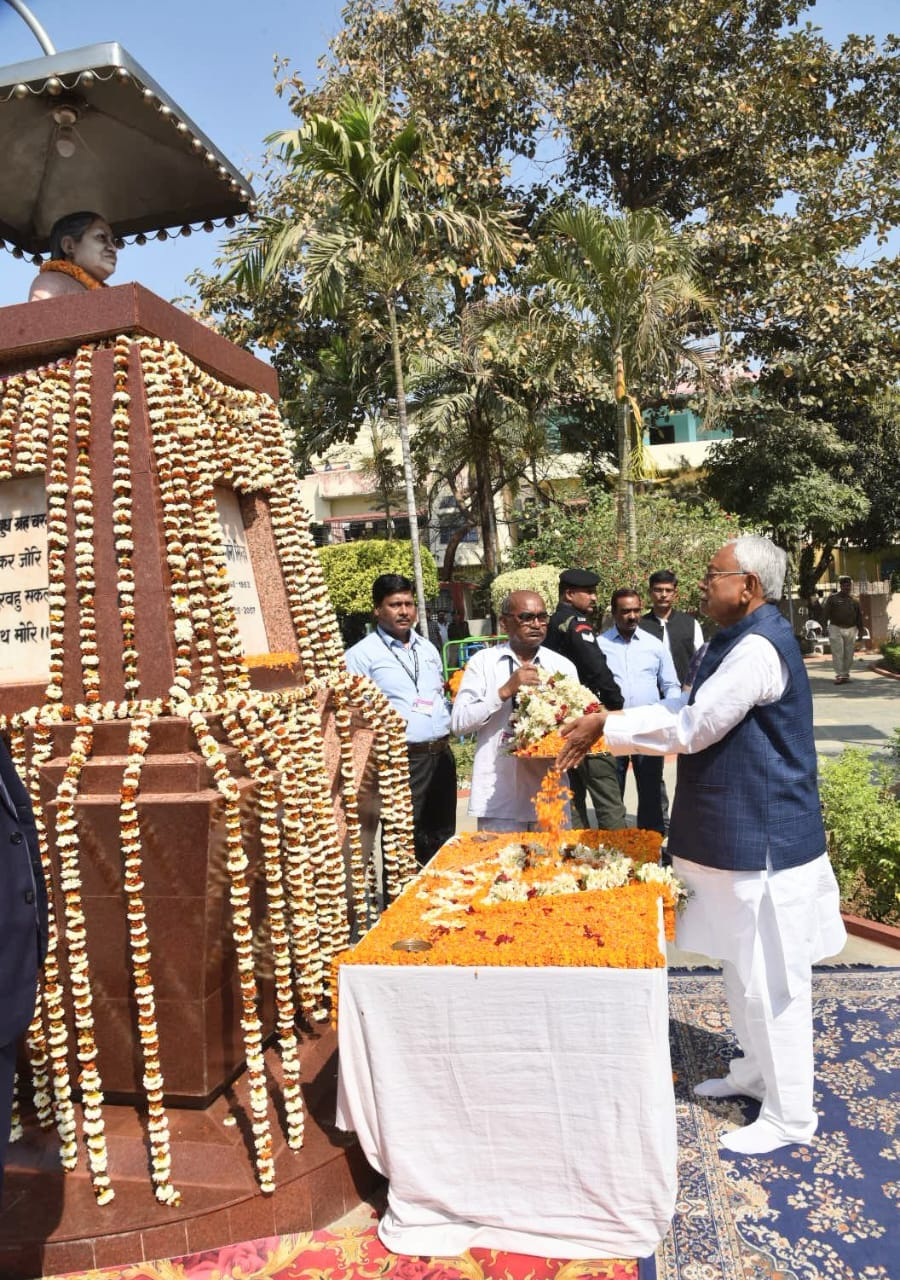
Nitish Kumar paying tribute to his wife Manju Sinha through her statue.

Kumar was born on 1 March 1951 in Bakhtiarpur, Bihar, to his mother Parmeshwari Devi and his father Kaviraj Ram Lakhan Singh, an ayurvedic practitioner. Nitish belongs to Kurmi agricultural caste. His nickname is 'Munna'. His native village is Kalyan Bigha, situated in the Nalanda district.

He has earned a degree in Electrical Engineering from Bihar College of Engineering (now NIT Patna) in 1972. He joined the Bihar State Electricity Board, half-heartedly, and later moved into politics. He married Manju Kumari Sinha (1955–2007) on 22 February 1973 and the couple has one son, named Nishant. Manju Sinha died in New Delhi on 14 May 2007 due to pneumonia.

== Early political career ==
Kumar belongs to a socialist class of politicians. During his early years as a politician, he was associated with Ram Manohar Lohia, S. N. Sinha, Karpuri Thakur, and V. P. Singh. Kumar participated in Jayaprakash Narayan's movement between 1974 and 1977 and joined the Janata party headed by Satyendra Narain Sinha. Unlike Lalu Prasad Yadav, who is considered as a crowd puller, Kumar is considered as a deft communicator.

Kumar fought and won his first election to the state assembly from Harnaut in 1985. In the initial years, Lalu Prasad Yadav was backed by Kumar as leader of the opposition in the Bihar Assembly in the year 1989, but Kumar later switched his loyalty to the BJP in 1996, after winning his first Lok Sabha seat from Barh.

The Janata Dal had survived splits in the past, when leaders like Kumar and George Fernandes defected to form the Samata Party in 1994. Still, it remained a baseless party after the decision of Lalu Prasad Yadav to form Rashtriya Janata Dal in 1997. The second split took place before Rabri Devi assuming power, which resulted in Janata Dal having only two leaders of any consequence in it, namely Sharad Yadav and Ram Vilas Paswan. Paswan was regarded as the rising leader of Dalits and had the credit of winning his elections with unprecedented margins. His popularity reached the national level when he was awarded the post of Minister of Railways in the United Front government in 1996 and was subsequently made the leader of Lok Sabha. His outreach was witnessed in the western Uttar Pradesh too, when his followers organised an impressive rally at the behest of a newly floated organisation called Dalit Panthers.

Sharad Yadav was also a veteran socialist leader, but without a massive support base. In the 1998 parliamentary elections, the Samata Party and Janata Dal, which were in a much weaker position after the formation of RJD, ended up eating each other's vote base. This made Kumar merge both parties to form the Janata Dal (United).

In 1999 Lok Sabha elections, Rashtriya Janata Dal received a setback at the hands of BJP+JD(U) combine. The new coalition emerged leading in 199 out of 324 assembly constituencies, and it was widely believed that in the forthcoming election to the Bihar state assembly, the Lalu-Rabri rule would come to an end. The RJD had fought the election in an alliance with the Congress, but the coalition didn't work, making state leadership of Congress believe that the maligned image of Lalu Prasad after his name was drawn in the Fodder Scam had eroded his support base. Consequently, Congress decided to fight the 2000 assembly elections alone.

The RJD had to be satisfied with the communist parties as coalition partners, but the seat-sharing conundrum in the camp of National Democratic Alliance made Kumar pull his Samta Party out of the Sharad Yadav and Ram Vilas Paswan faction of the Janata Dal. Differences also arose between the BJP and Kumar as the latter wanted to be projected as the Chief Minister of Bihar, but the former was not in favour. Even Paswan also wanted to be a CM face. The Muslims and OBCs were too divided in their opinion. A section of Muslims, which included the poor communities like Pasmanda, were of the view that Yadav only strengthened upper Muslims like Shaikh, Sayyid and Pathans, and they were in search of new options.

Yadav also alienated other dominant backward castes like Koeri and Kurmi since his projection as the saviour of Muslims. It is argued by Sanjay Kumar that the belief that "the dominant OBCs like the twin caste of Koeri-Kurmi will ask for a share in power if he seeks their support, while the Muslims will remain satisfied with the protection during communal riots only" made Yadav neglect them. Moreover, the divisions in both camps made the political atmosphere in the state a charged one in which many parties were fighting against each other with no visible frontiers. JD(U) and BJP were fighting against each other on some of the seats, and so was the Samta Party. The result was a setback for the BJP, which in media campaigns was emerging with a massive victory. RJD emerged as the single largest party and with the political manoeuvring of Lalu Yadav, Rabri Devi was sworn in as the Chief Minister again. The media largely failed to gauge the ground level polarisation in Bihar. According to Sanjay Kumar:

There can be no doubt about one thing: the upper-caste media was always anti-Lalu, and it was either not aware of the ground-level polarisation in Bihar, or deliberately ignored it. If the election result did not appear as a setback for RJD, it was largely because of the bleak picture painted by the media. Against this background, RJD's defeat had appeared like a victory.

Even after serving imprisonment in connection with the 1997 scam, Lalu seemed to relish his role as the lower-caste jester. He argued that corruption charges against him and his family were the conspiracy of the upper-caste bureaucracy and media elites threatened by the rise of peasant cultivator castes.

In 2004 General elections, Lalu's RJD had outperformed other state-based parties by winning 26 Lok Sabha seats in Bihar. He was awarded the post of Union Railway minister but the rising aspirations of the extremely backward castes unleashed by him resulted in JD(U) and BJP led coalition to defeat his party in 2005 Bihar Assembly elections.

=== Kumar as a Union Minister ===
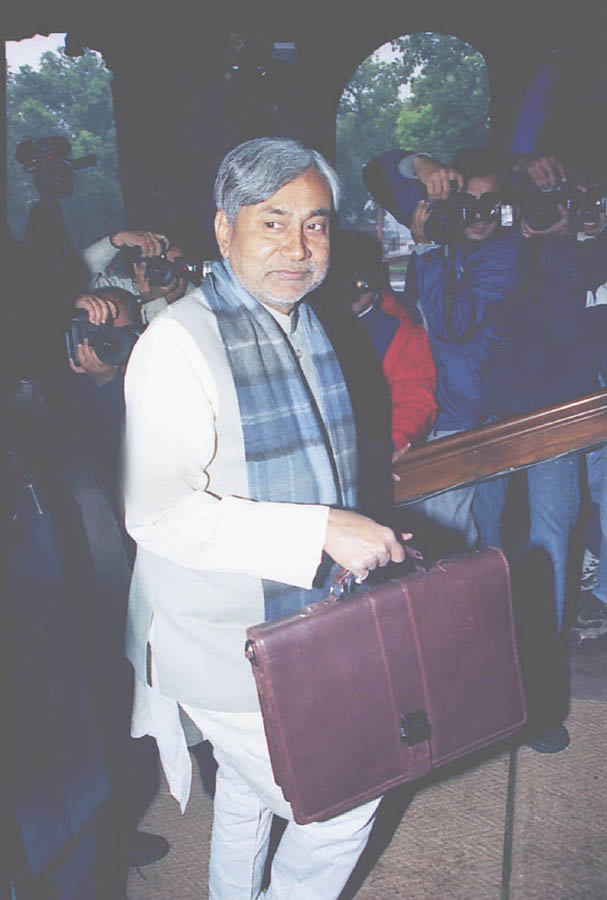
Union Minister for Railways Shri Nitish Kumar entering Parliament to present Interim Railway Budget (2004–05) in New Delhi on 30 January 2004

Nitish was briefly the Union Minister for Railways and Minister for Surface Transport and later, the Minister for Agriculture in 1998–99, in the NDA government of Atal Bihari Vajpayee. In August 1999, he resigned following the Gaisal train disaster, for which he took responsibility as a minister. However, in his short stint as Railway Minister, he brought in widespread reforms, such as internet ticket booking facility in 2002, opening a record number of railway ticket booking counters and introducing the tatkal scheme for instant booking.

Later that year, he rejoined the Union Cabinet as Minister for Agriculture. From 2001 to May 2004, he was – again – the Union Minister for Railways. In the 2004 Lok Sabha elections, he contested elections from two places, when he was elected from Nalanda but lost from his traditional constituency, Barh.

== Chief Minister of Bihar ==
Kumar is a member of the Janata Dal (United) political party. As the chief minister, he appointed more than 100,000 school teachers, ensured that doctors worked in primary health centres, electrified many villages, paved roads, cut female illiteracy by half, turned around a lawless state by cracking down on criminals and doubled the income of the average Bihari. Nitish Kumar is often criticised for frequently changing and dumping alliances throughout his political career for the sake of continuing as chief minister. This behaviour has resulted in him earning the nickname Paltu Ram, meaning a person who frequently changes allegiance.

=== First term (2000) ===
In March 2000, Nitish was elected Chief Minister of Bihar for the first time at the behest of the Vajpayee Government in the centre, as Samata Party member. NDA and allies had 151 MLAs whereas Lalu Prasad Yadav had 159 MLAs in the 324 member house. Both alliances were less than the majority mark that is 163. Nitish resigned before he could prove his numbers in the house. He lasted 7 days in the post. There was no one as deputy cm. This was the only time he served as chief minister of United Bihar before bifurcation of Jharkhand.

=== Second term (2005–2010) ===
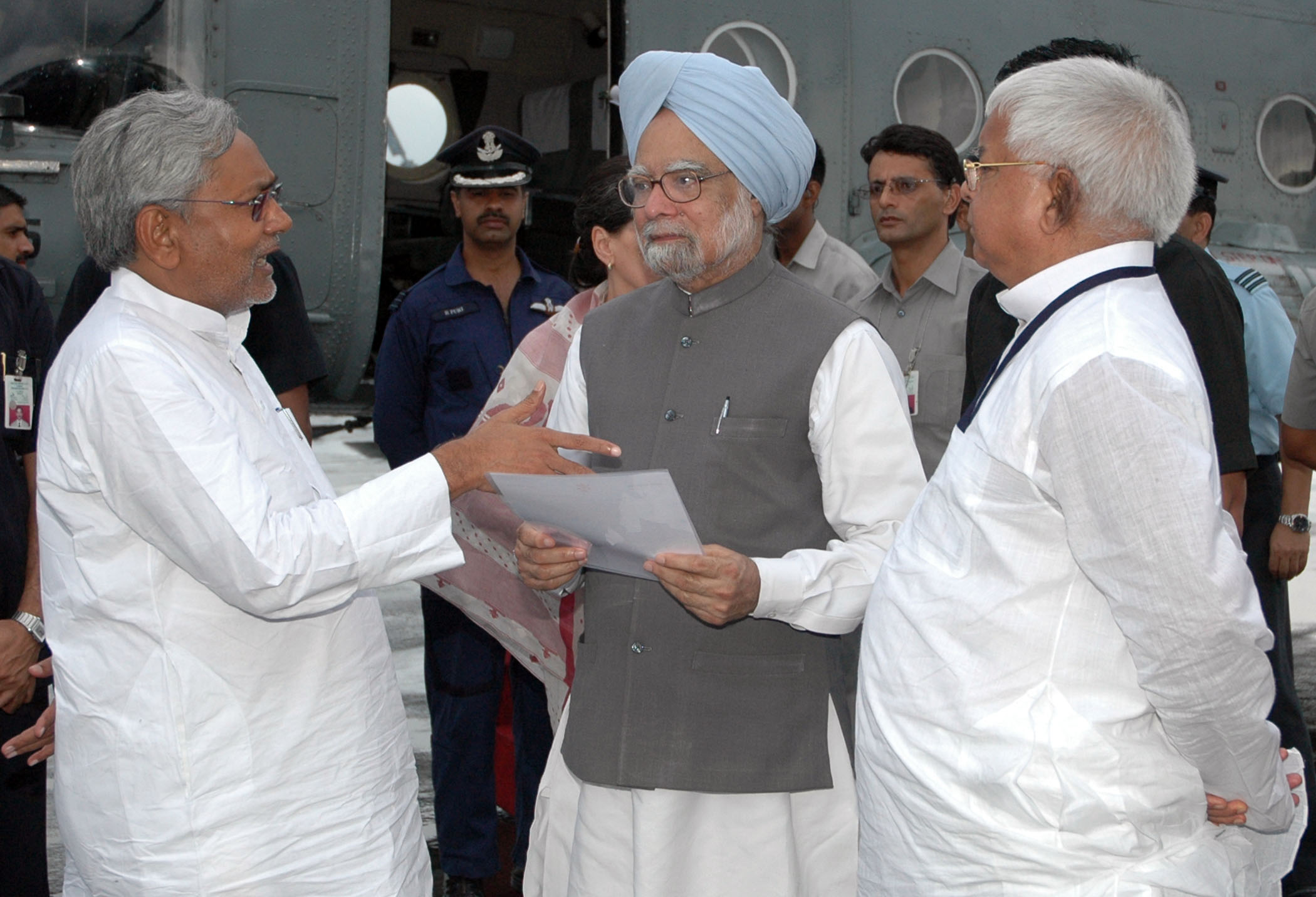
Nitish Kumar and Lalu Prasad Yadav discussing with the Prime Minister, Manmohan Singh about the relief operations on flood-affected areas, in Bihar, 28 August 2008

After victory in 2005 Bihar Assembly elections, Kumar a leader of OBC Kurmi caste was sworn in as the chief minister with Sushil Modi as his deputy. During Lalu's time, backward caste candidates came to dominate the Bihar assembly claiming half of the seats in it and it was the aspiration of this powerful social community that led to friction among the united backwards, leading to the rise of Kumar who made both social justice and development as his political theme.

=== Third term (2010–2014) ===
Kumar's government also initiated bicycle and meal programs. Giving bicycles to girls who stayed in school resulted in the state getting a huge number of girls into schools and a reduction in school drop-out rates.

In 2010, Kumar's party swept back to power along with its then allies, the Bharatiya Janata Party, and he again became Chief Minister along with Sushil Modi as deputy. The alliance won 206 seats, while the RJD won 22. For the first time, electorates witnessed high turnout of women and young voters, while this was declared as the fairest election in Bihar, with no bloodshed or poll violence. On 16 June 2013, the JDU separated from NDA after Narendra Modi was announced as the Prime Ministerial candidate of the BJP for the 2014 Indian general election, following which Ministers from the BJP were dropped from the cabinet.

On 17 May 2014, Kumar submitted his resignation to the Governor of Bihar, D. Y. Patil a day after his party fared poorly in the 2014 Lok Sabha elections, winning just 2 seats against 20 seats in the previous election by contesting alone. Kumar resigned, taking the moral responsibility of his party's poor performance in the election, and Jitan Ram Manjhi took over.

=== Fourth term (2015) ===
Nitish served a fourth term for a brief period of time in 2015. Kumar again became Chief Minister on 22 February 2015, on the backdrop of upcoming 2015 Bihar Legislative Assembly election, considered to be his toughest election to date with no one as deputy. His JD(U), along with RJD and Congress, formed the Mahagathbandhan (Grand Alliance) to counter the BJP in Bihar.

=== Fifth term (2015–2017) ===
External videos
- Fir se ek bar ho Bihar me Bahar ho, fir se ek bar ho Nitish Kumar ho Official song of Nitish Kumar's election campaign for 2015 Bihar Assembly elections.

Kumar campaigned aggressively during the elections for the Grand Alliance, countering the allegations raised by Narendra Modi and the BJP.

The Grand Alliance won the Assembly election by a margin of 178 over the BJP and its allies, with RJD emerging as the largest party with 80 seats and JD(U) placed second with 71. Kumar was sworn in as Chief Minister on 20 November 2015 for a record fifth time and Lalu Prasad's younger son Tejashwi Yadav became Deputy Chief Minister of Bihar.

Kumar's campaign was managed by Prashant Kishor's Indian Political Action Committee (I-PAC) who were hired to manage the campaign for JD(U). I-PAC designed the campaign strategy which included reaching out to a larger set of voters through innovative campaigns, including sending hundreds of branded cycles for outreach, Har Ghar Dastak (door-to-door outreach) and the DNA campaign.Bihar Excise (Amendment) Act, 2016 On 26 November 2015, Bihar Chief Minister Nitish Kumar announced that alcohol would be banned in the state from 1 April 2016. Kumar officially declared the total ban on 5 April 2016, and said in a press conference, "All type of liquor will be banned in the state from today. Sale [and consumption] of any type of alcohol in hotels, bars, clubs and any other place will be illegal from today onwards." Violating the law carries a penalty of 5 years to 10 years imprisonment.

=== Sixth term (2017–2020) ===
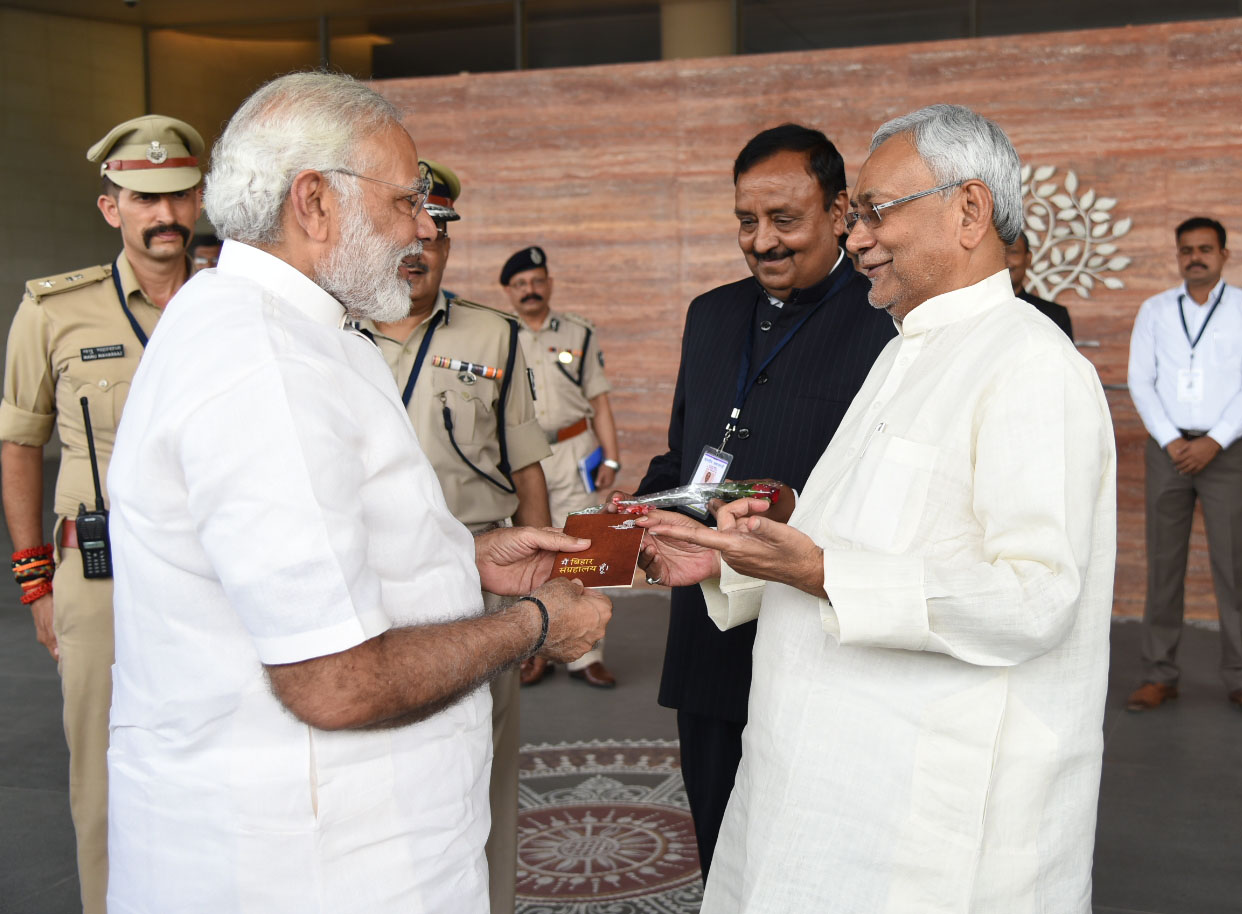
Chief Minister of Bihar Nitish Kumar with Prime Minister Narendra Modi in 2017

When corruption charges were levelled against Tejashwi Yadav, the Deputy Chief Minister, Kumar asked for him to resign from the cabinet. The Rashtriya Janata Dal refused to do so, and therefore Kumar resigned on 26 July 2017, thus ending the Grand Alliance. He joined the principal opposition, the NDA, and came back to power within a few hours with Sushil Modi as deputy.

=== Seventh term (2020–2022) ===
Capitalising on his 15 years consecutive terms as Chief Minister, Kumar highlighted various achievements and developments and listed various schemes carried out by his government and finally managed to get over a tightly contested election. NDA managed to get majority in Legislature Assembly by winning 125 seats as compared to Mahagathbandhan's 110 seats. He was sworn in as Bihar Chief Minister for seventh time in 20 years in the presence of top leaders of NDA.

On 8 December 2020, his deputy Sushil Kumar Modi was elected unopposed to the Rajya Sabha from Bihar to fill the vacant seat after the demise of Ram Vilas Paswan. So, Nitish resigned on 16 August 2020 and returned as Chief Minister with his new deputies Tarkishore Prasad and Renu Devi.

On 9 August 2022, Kumar resigned as chief minister and removed his party from the NDA, announcing that his party had rejoined the Mahagathbandhan, and would form a governing coalition with the RJD and INC.

=== Eighth term (2022–2024) ===
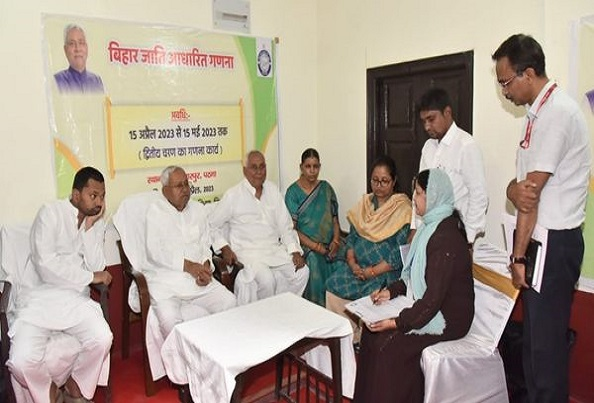
Nitish Kumar inaugurating the second phase of caste based survey in his ancestral village of Bakhtiarpur, with his family members

On 9 August 2022, Kumar broke the alliance with the BJP and resigned as chief minister and revoked his party from the NDA, announcing that his party had rejoined the Mahagathbandhan, comprising RJD, INC, CPI and other independents, and would form a governing coalition. On 10 August he sworn in as the chief minister of the state for the eighth time in 22 years with Tejaswini as his deputy. Bihar caste-based survey 2023 started in his sixth term.

During this term, in January – February 2023, Kumar initiated his Samadhan Yatra, an outreach campaign, through which he visited various localities of the thirty eight districts of the state of Bihar. The primary motive behind these visits was overseeing the status of various state government developmental schemes and expediting their implementation on ground. During these visits, he was accompanied by his deputy Tejaswi Yadav and occasionally his cabinet ministers, when required.

On 8 November 2023, the Bihar Assembly adjourned amidst protests by the opposition BJP demanding the resignation of Chief Minister Nitish Kumar following his controversial remarks about women's education and population control. Kumar expressed regret for any offence his comments may have caused. Prime Minister Narendra Modi criticised Kumar, accusing him of having no shame and insulting women, without directly naming him. Kumar apologised, retracting his statements and reaffirming his support for women's education and empowerment. A complaint was also filed against Kumar for his remarks, with a hearing set for 25 November 2023. Meanwhile, women's organisations condemned the remarks, and the former Chief Minister of Bihar, Rabri Devi, defended Kumar, suggesting the comments were a slip of the tongue.

On 28 January 2024, Kumar resigned as chief minister and rejoined NDA.

=== Ninth term (2024–2025) ===
On 28 January, Kumar resigned as the chief minister and broke the Mahagathbandhan alliance with RJD and Congress, and rejoined the BJP-led NDA alliance sparking a political crisis. On the same day, he was sworn in as the Chief Minister for the ninth time in 24 years. On 21 March 2025, a petition was filed against him in a Bihar court for allegedly disrespecting the national anthem during a public event. Samrat Chaudhary and Vijay Sinha sworn as his deputies.

=== Tenth term (2025–2026) ===
On 20 November 2025, Kumar took oath as the Chief Minister of Bihar for the 10th time along with 26 Ministers, including one Muslim and three women following the ruling alliace's landslide victory in the assembly elections. His deputies Samrat Chaudhary and Vijay Kumar Sinha were re-elected as the deputy CM.

A video of Kumar pulling down a Muslim female's veil during a ceremony which confirmed her appointment as a doctor of alternative medicine on 15 December 2025 went viral, and this incident caused widespread condemnation from various political parties. The doctor eventually joined 4 weeks after the controversy.

After Kumar announced his pending resignation in March 2026, his son Nishant joined the JD(U); this was seen as a departure from his previous policy of anti-dynasticism. Nishant was inducted in the Choudhary ministry as health minister.

== Issues surrounding mental health ==
Allegations and rumours about failing mental health of Nitish Kumar have long been in circulation, based primarily on his behavioural aspects on many public occasions, many of which have also hit media limelights. While his political opponents question his mental health, his supporters call it entirely baseless.

== Policies ==
=== Law and order reform ===
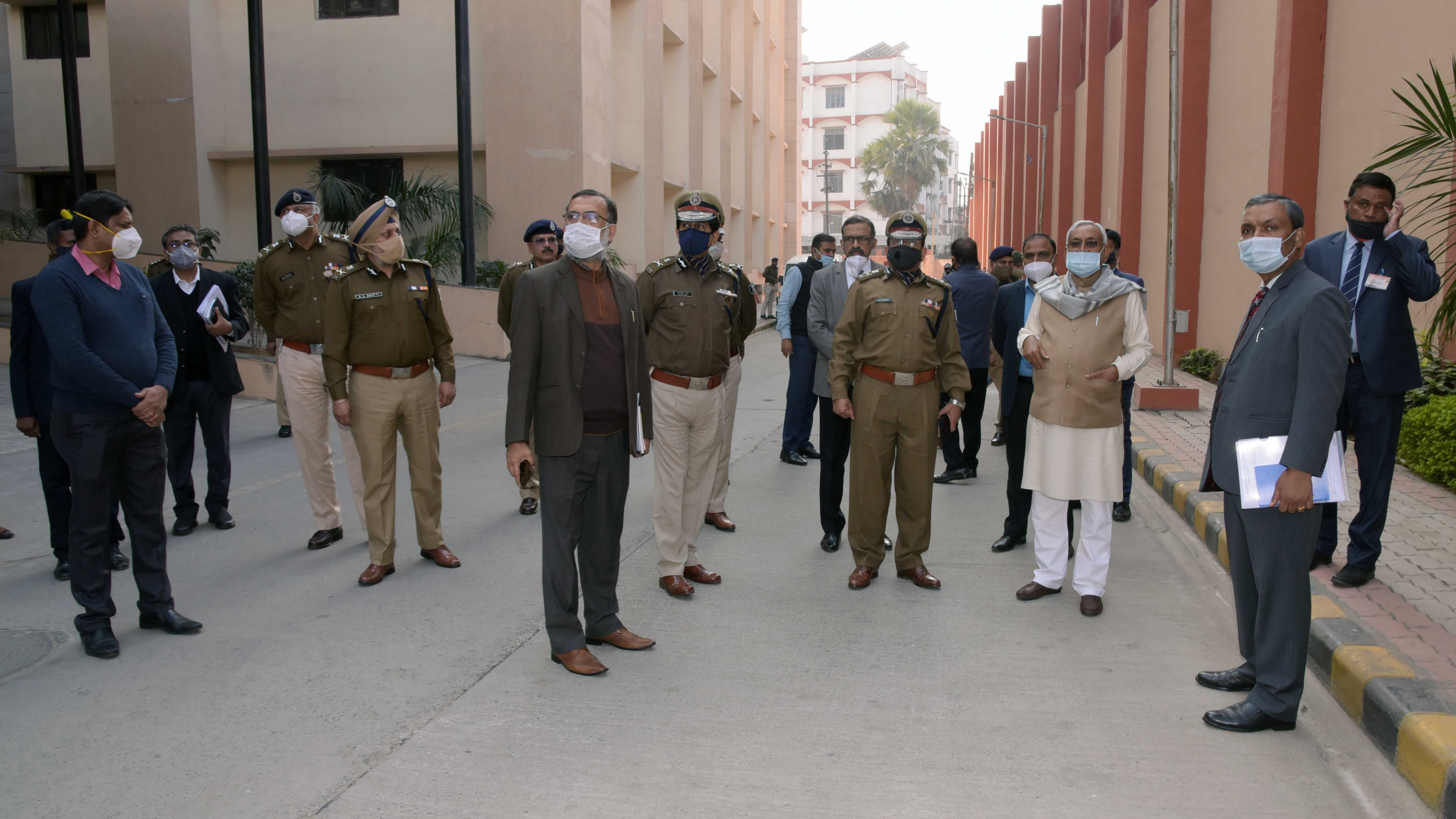
Nitish Kumar in conversation with higher police officials of state, while inspecting Sardar Patel Bhavan, Patna

One of the biggest challenges before Kumar after becoming Chief Minister, during his first term, was deteriorated law and order situation of the state. There were many organised criminal gangs active in the state, and kidnapping was rampant. Besides this, the challenge of left wing extremism in some of the backward areas of the state was also persisting for a long time. Kumar brought the Arms Act, and special courts were set up to expedite the process of conviction of those held under this act. Bringing of the Arms Act and stringent implementation brought two-way benefits for the Government; first, it became easy for the police to arrest a criminal and second, the use of lethal weapons became prohibited.

Kumar also recruited the retired army officials and soldiers to create a special wing of Police called Special Auxiliary Police (SAP), in order to deal with the Maoist challenge in the state. It brought some kind of economic engagement for the retired military personnel, and at the same time, made available professionally trained commandos for the Bihar Police at low budgetary expense. These commandos were better than the police constables recruited by the state, in order to deal with the extremists. They just needed a special category of weapons, which was provided by the state under Kumar. The retired intelligence officers were also recruited to form an investigation department, called "Special Vigilance Unit" (SVU). This body dealt with the offences at the level of high level government officials. For acquisition of property of the accused during trial, Bihar Special Court Act 2009 was brought, which became effective since 2010. The SVU remained a successful idea in dealing with corruption at the higher level of bureaucracy. One of the first case before it was the trial of former Director General of Police, Narayan Mishra, who was held for several corruption charges against him.

In order to recruit only the qualified candidates in the state Police, the reform in recruitment examination was also brought. Kumar introduced the "Carbon Copy system" in the written examination, which was to be held to recruit the new entrants. In order to prevent tampering of the examination copy, the original copy marked by the candidate was sent directly to the strong room after the examination. The evaluators used to get only the Carbon Copy, and in case of any discrepancy, the original copy was matched with the Carbon Copy evaluated by the evaluators. Further, a permanent recruitment examination was also made compulsory and the physical examination was made qualifying in determining merit, for selection to constabulary. In the tenure of Chief Ministers prior to Kumar, only physical examination was deciding factor in selecting the constables. This system was prone to corruption and favoritism.

The push to the speedy trial under Kumar's government brought results within a short period of time, and in 2006 itself, a total of 6,839 offenders were convicted. There witnessed a massive drop in cases registered under the Arms act in the forthcoming terms of Kumar as the Chief Minister. It declined to just 495 by the end of 2010 from 1609 in 2006. According to one opinion, the massive decline was a result of fleeing of many criminals from the state, in order to seek refuse in the terai region of Nepal as well as eschewing of crime by others to become good samaritans.

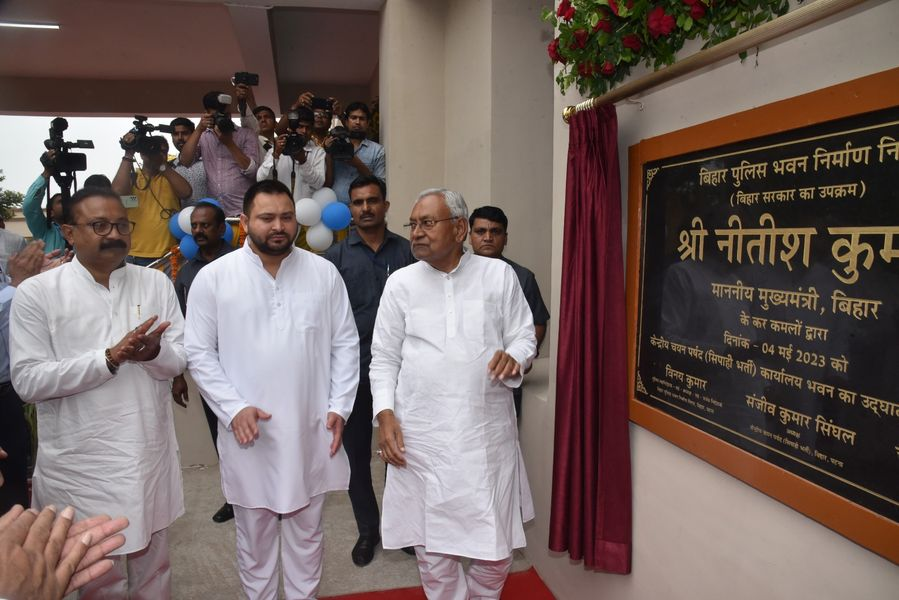
Nitish Kumar and Tejaswi Yadav inaugurating the office building of Bihar Police in 2023.

Kumar's government also took step to empower the District Magistrate to apprehend the officials taking bribe in order to reduce corruption. One of the major problem of the prison system of Bihar was laxity available to criminals to operate cell phones from the jail. Many a time, organised crime were planned from within the premise of Bihar's prison. The government took step to fix Mobile phone jammers in jails, to prohibit the gangsters from operating cell phones. Bihar also actively enforced the All India Prison reforms program, outlined by Supreme Court of India in a judgement, in order to reform the entire operating system of jails. It included reducing the number of inmates to be included in a particular prison, a step, which was necessary to prevent the overcrowding.

In order to break the link of the prisoners with the jail authorities, Kumar's government took step like periodically transferring the dreaded criminals, who were convicted in large number of criminal cases from one prison to more secure cells located in Bhagalpur and Beur. One of the significant example of this include, the transfer of Ajay Kanu, a naxalite, who was prime accused in "2005 Jahanabad Jail Break case", to Beur Jail. In 2022, gangsters like Rakesh Mahto, who was leader of crime syndicate being organised from Muzaffarpur, was also transferred from Muzaffarpur to Bhagalpur Jail, in a high security Prison cell. Other example, which is part of this routine procedure is of Rashtriya Janata Dal Member of Bihar Legislative Council, Ritlal Yadav, who had numerous cases of extortion and murder against him. D.N Gautam, who served as Director General of Bihar Police, stated in his autobiography that Nitish Kumar was instrumental in improving the law and order situation in the state of Bihar. Gautam compared the tenures of Kumar's predecessors and has mentioned that in the 1980s, politicians used to come out in support of criminals openly. When Gautam was serving as Rohtas SP and Shahabad Range DIG, he mentions that at least six Members of Bihar Legislative Assembly had extended patronage to dreaded dacoit gangs of Kaimur hills, and they were strictly opposed to any sort of police action against dacoit Ramchandra Koeri, who operated out of Kaimur hills in Rohtas district. Gautam also mentions that though Kumar had kept his proposal of creation of 'Anti Terrorist Squad' in abeyance, after the Bodhgaya blasts, it was established expeditiously.

=== Consolidation of Extremely Backward Castes ===
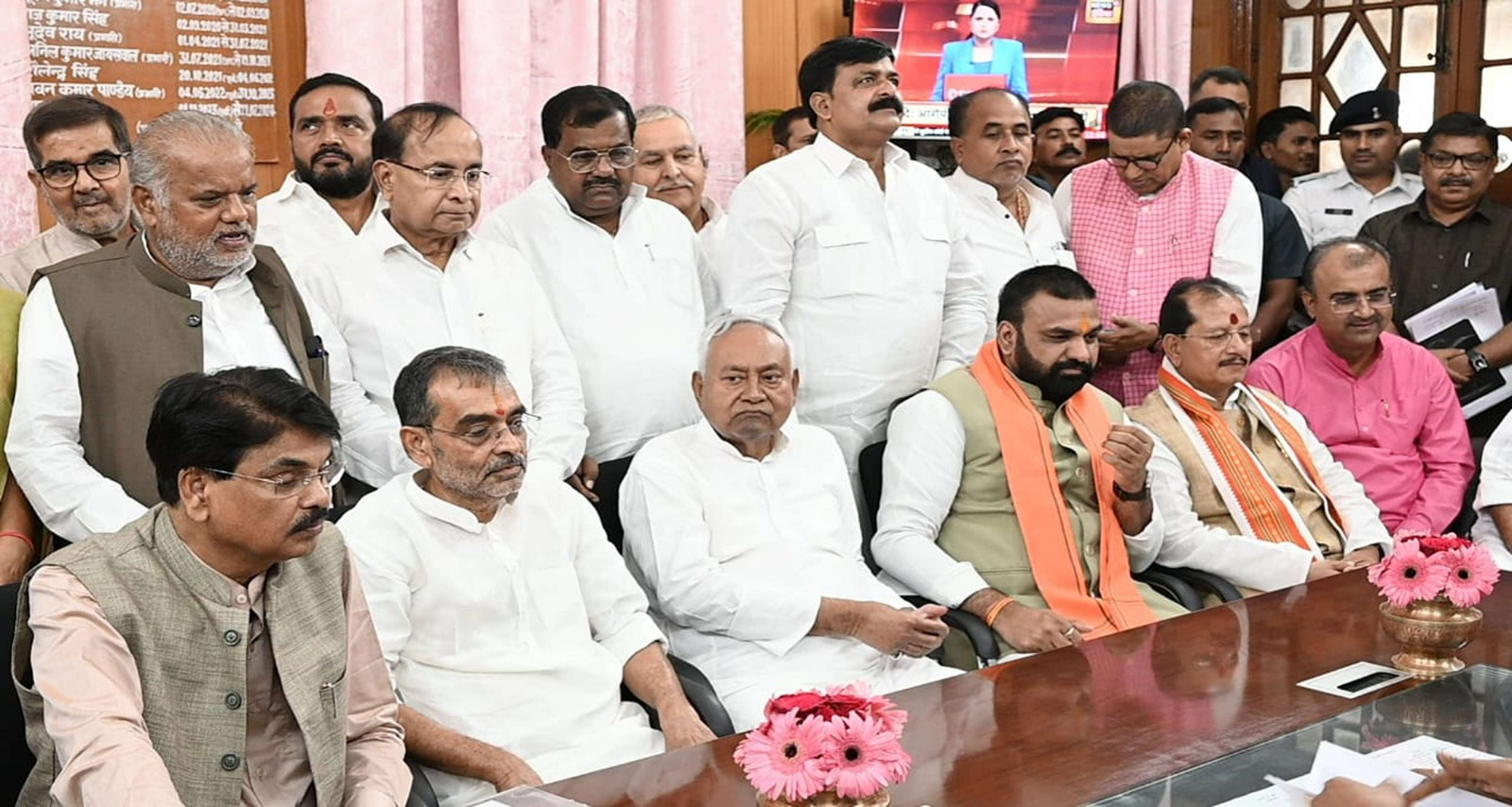
Nitish Kumar with Deputy Chief Minister of Bihar Samrat Chaudhary participating in nomination of Upendra Kushwaha to Rajya Sabha.

Kumar had dual challenge of keeping his core political base of Koeris, Kurmis and Extremely Backward Castes together with a section of upper castes. The National Democratic Alliance, of which Kumar's party was a part, was relying upon the support of a section of upper caste. The share of this section in the political power structure was making it difficult for Kumar to carry on his program of social justice, specially with respect to consolidation of 'Extremely Backward Castes' (EBC). This group comprised the lower backwards– the castes other than the Koeri, Kurmi, Yadav and Bania. Kumar's government brought the idea of 50% reservation for the women in the Panchayati Raj institutions at all level. This plan also included 20% reservation in these bodies for the members of Extremely Backward Castes. These quotas, which were given separately to already existing quotas for Schedule Castes and Schedule Tribes in local bodies, led to political consolidation of Extremely Backward Castes.

The reservation to this section of society brought a massive increase in their representation in the three tier Panchayati Raj system. There were many representatives of the EBCs for the post of Mukhiya, Pramukhs of Panchayat Samiti as well as President of Zila Parishad. The membership of this social group in Panchyat Samiti and Zila Parishad also increased. Kumar's government also announced a scheme of 50% reservation in state judicial services, within this, the EBCs were given 21% share as against the Other Backward Class, which was given 12% share. The Schedule Castes were also given 16% share of this 50% reservation pie. The step was intended to bring more and more candidates from these social groups in lower judiciary.

In order to strengthen his outreach and acceptability among the members of Extremely Backward Castes, and to expand his voter base beyond his traditional vote bank, Nitish Kumar embarked on a project to promote EBC leaders within his party. In 2005, a less known leader from the Kahar caste, Chandeshwar Prasad grabbed his attention and Kumar promoted him by making the head of Extremely Backward Caste wing of his party. He was also given significant positions like those of membership of syndicate of Magadh University. At the behest of Nitish Kumar, National Democratic Alliance in 2019 projected Prasad as the candidate for Indian General Elections from Jahanabad Lok Sabha constituency, which was believed to be a Bhumihar caste dominated constituency. But, with the backing of Janata Dal United, Prasad as a NDA candidate was able to defeat Rashtriya Janata Dal leader Surendra Prasad Yadav. This was first instance in the history of constituency that an Extremely Backward Caste leader was elected from an upper caste dominated constituency. Prior to 2024 Lok Sabha polls, on the direction of Nitish Kumar, JDU state president Umesh Singh Kushwaha also launched Bheem Samvad, Karpoori Charcha and Bhaichara Yatra (campaigns) to mobilise Dalits, Extremely Backward Castes and Muslims.

=== Promotion of sport culture ===
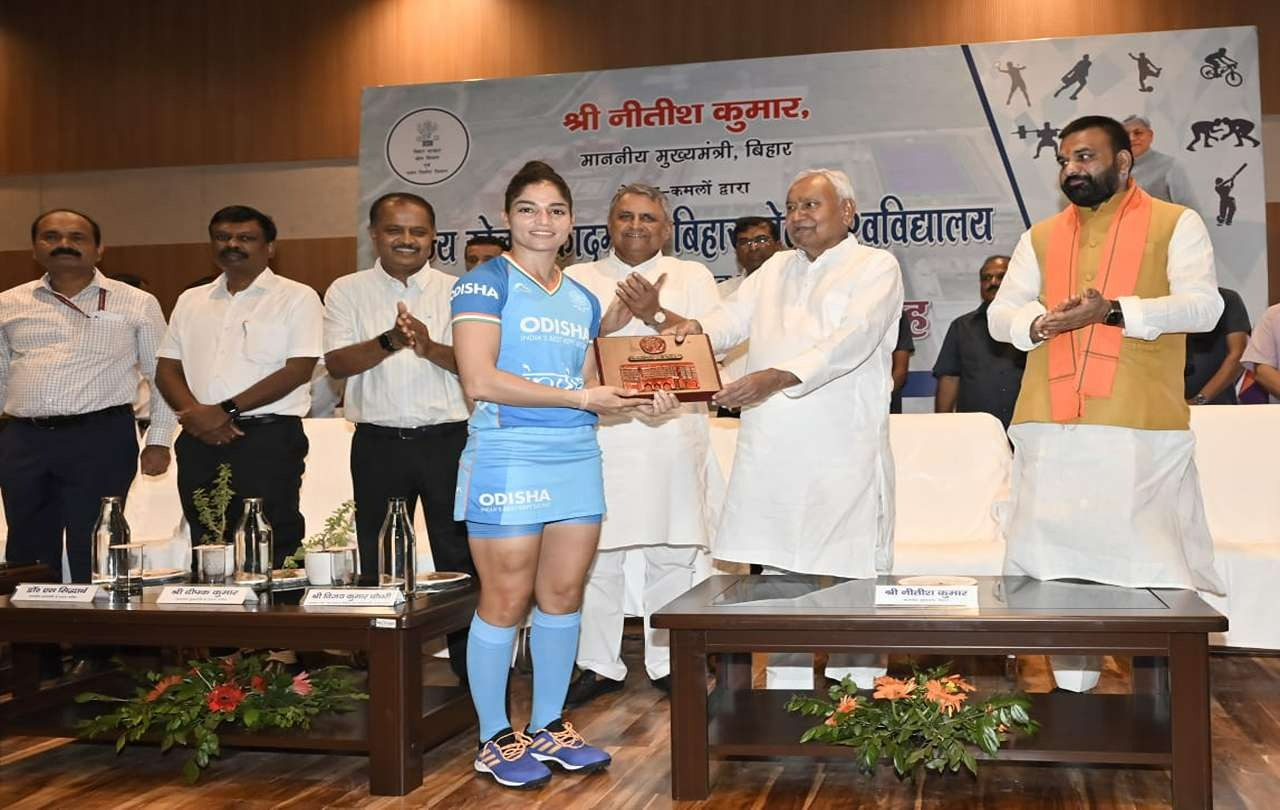
Nitish Kumar and Samrat Chaudhary at the Rajgir Sports Academy felicitating sport persons of the state on 29 August 2024.

On 29 August 2024, Kumar inaugurated Rajgir Sports Complex and Cricket stadium, which was built in his tenure with the overall funding of ₹ 750 crore. Kumar was joined by Deputy Chief Minister Samrat Chaudhary and Building Construction minister Jayant Raj Kushwaha. The sport complex was built on 90 acre of land and contained the facilities for more than 23 sports. This was built to realise the vision of Kumar to create a suitable environment for the sport persons of the state to have proper training environment, in order to enhance their performance in the international gaming events. The complex was thus built with world class sporting infrastructure and technology. It was only in 2007 that Kumar announced that Rajgir will get its own sport stadium. The complex contains a main cricket stadium along with eight smaller stadiums. It contains a world class sports library and training academies.

Soon after the inauguration by Kumar, Asian Hockey Federation announced that this state sports academy of Bihar will host the Asian Women's Hockey Championship of 2024.

=== Jeevika project for rural livelihood promotion ===
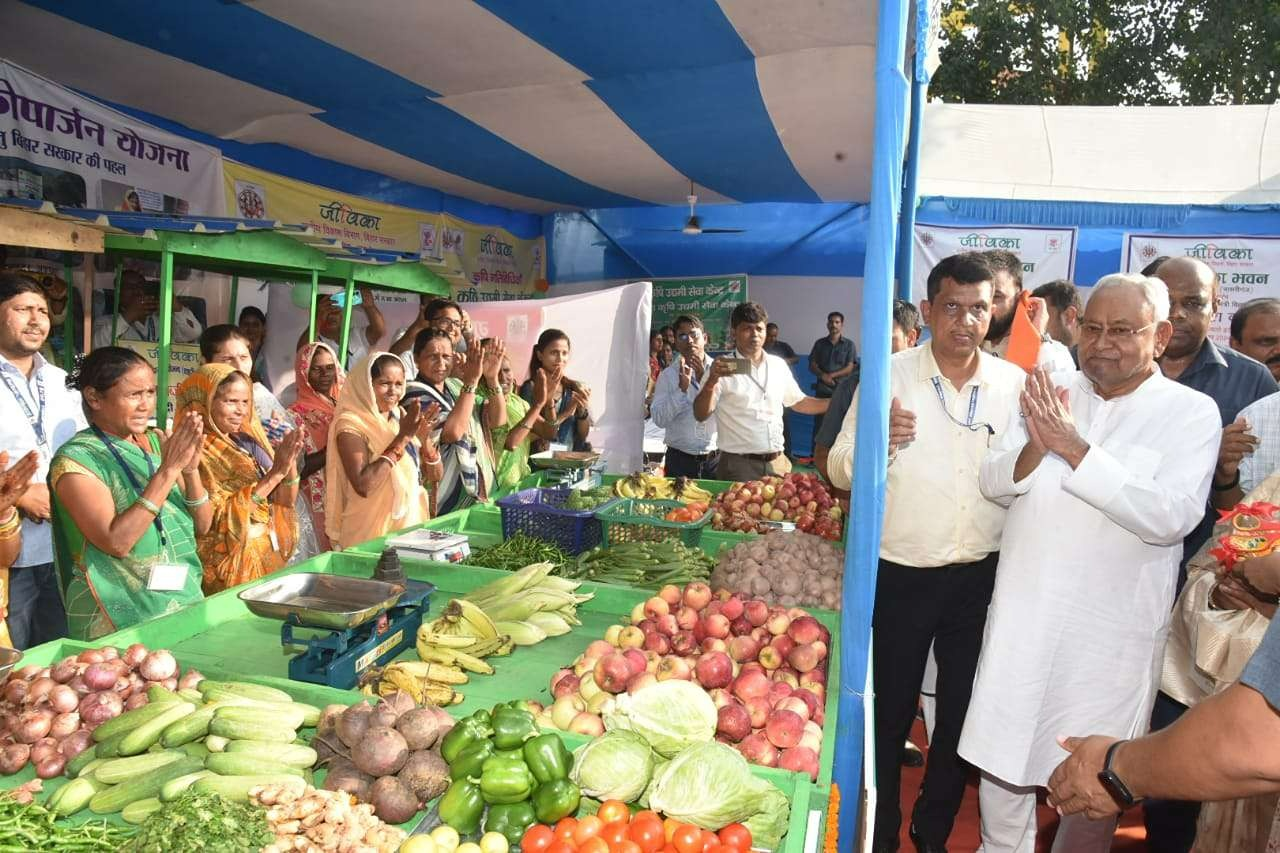
CM Nitish Kumar inspecting the stalls set up by Jivika Didis on 2 September 2024.

Nitish Kumar's government launched the Jeevika project also known as Bihar Rural Livelihood Project in 2006-07. This was launched with the support of World Bank. Under this project the bank accounts of rural women were opened and credit was distributed to them for livelihood generation. The women were trained and work according to their skills was provided to them locally. This was achieved through promotion of small cooperatives consisting of group of upto twelve women. Later, the ambit of work given to women under Jeevika project, who are locally known as Jeevika Didis in Bihar, was expanded to providing financial services in rural areas and acting as banking correspondents (Bank Sakhis) from producing agricultural commodities.

Kumar government also launched 'Didi Ki Rasoi'. Under this project, women run pantries were opened which were tasked with providing home made fresh food for the schools, hospitals, offices and other places run by state government. Later, states like Gujarat and Karnataka also decided to adopt this scheme in their local developmental programmes. The governments of these states thus sent officials to study the implementation of the scheme by the Bihar government.

=== Other developmental initiatives ===
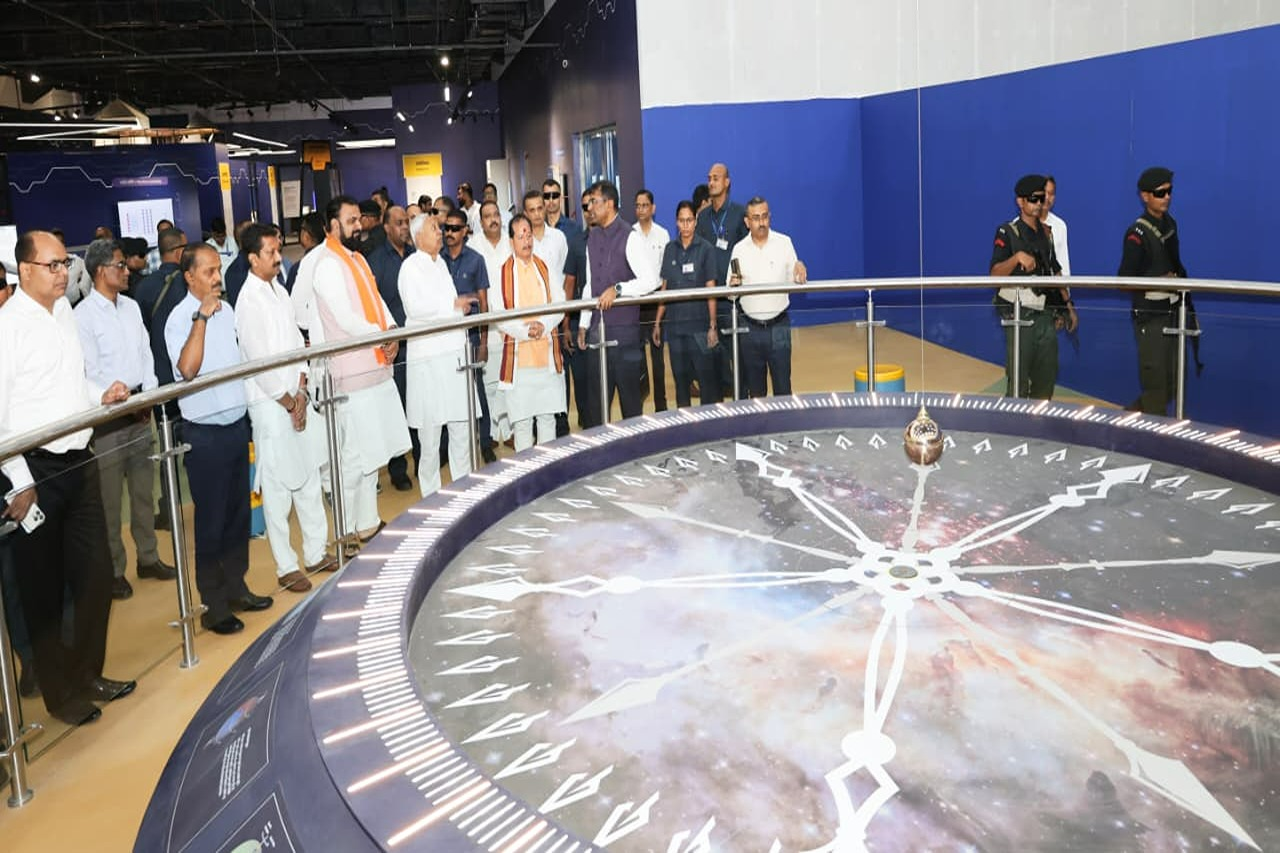
Nitish Kumar and Deputy Chief Minister Samrat Chaudhary inaugurating APJ Abdul Kalam science city in Patna in 2025.

Kumar government also initiated the project to establish a science city in the capital city Patna named after former president Dr A.P.J Abdul Kalam. It was established with the total budget of 889 crores with an aim to explain various scientific principles in a lucid way for the science enthusiasts. Its foundation was laid in 2019 and it completed in 2025.

In 2025, Kumar also led establishment of Buddha Samyak Darshan Museum and Memorial Stupa in Vaishali district of Bihar to celebrate Budhhist culture of the state.

== Biographies ==
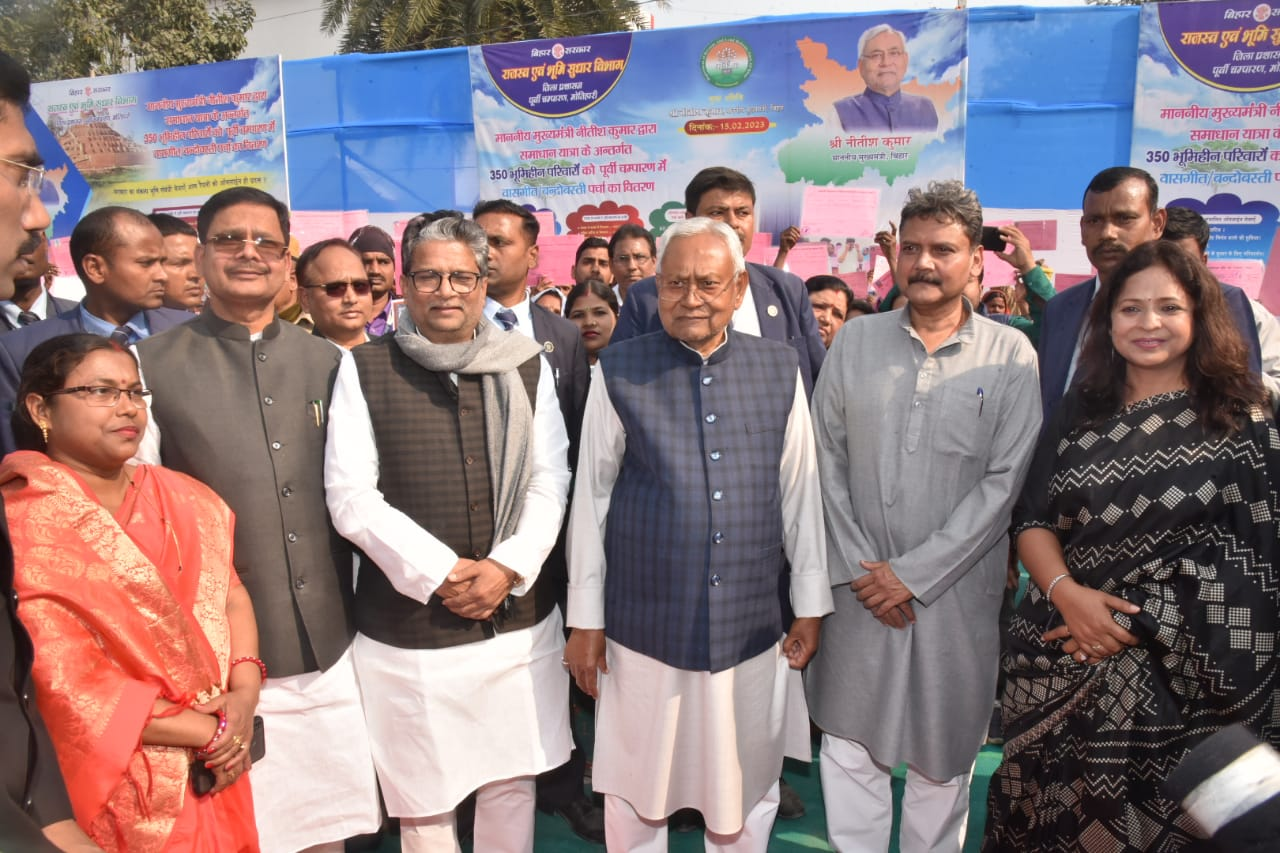
Nitish Kumar during his Samadhan Yatra (reachout campaign to oversee the implementation of schemes) with ministers Alok Kumar Mehta (left) and Sunil Kumar (right)

- Sankarshan Thakur authored Single Man: The Life and Times of Nitish Kumar of Bihar.
- Arun Sinha has authored a book titled Nitish Kumar and The Rise of Bihar.

== Awards and recognition ==
- Anuvrat Puraskar, by Shwetambar Terapanthi Mahasabha (Jain organisation), for enforcing total prohibition on liquor in Bihar, 2017
- JP Memorial Award, Nagpur's Manav Mandir, 2013
- Ranked 77th in Foreign Policy Magazine' top 100 global thinkers 2012
- XLRI, Jamshedpur Sir Jehangir Ghandy Medal for Industrial & Social Peace 2011
- "MSN Indian of the Year 2010"
- NDTV Indian of the Year – Politics, 2010
- Forbes' "India's Person of the Year", 2010
- CNN-IBN "Indian of the Year Award" – Politics, 2010
- NDTV Indian of the Year – Politics, 2009
- Economics Times "Business Reformer of the Year 2009"
- Polio Eradication Championship Award 2009, by Rotary International
- CNN-IBN Great Indian of the Year – Politics, 2008
- The Best Chief Minister, according to the CNN-IBN and Hindustan Times State of the Nation Poll 2007

== Positions held ==
Period	Positions	Note
1977	Contested first assembly elections on a Janata Party ticket from Harnaut but lost	
1980	Contested from Harnaut again, this time on Janata Party (Secular) ticket. But he lost again.	
1985–89	Member, Bihar Legislative Assembly, from Harnaut	1st term in Legislative Assembly
1986–87	Member, Committee on Petitions, Bihar Legislative Assembly	
1987–88	President, Yuva Lok Dal, Bihar	
1987–89	Member, Committee on Public Undertakings, Bihar Legislative Assembly.	
1989	Secretary-General, Janata Dal, Bihar	
1989	Elected to 9th Lok Sabha from Barh	1st term in Lok Sabha
1989 – 16 July 1990	Member, House Committee	Resigned
April 1990 – November 1990	Union Minister of State, Agriculture and Co-operation	
1991	Re-elected to 10th Lok Sabha	2nd term in Lok Sabha
1991–93	General-Secretary, Janata Dal. Deputy Leader of Janata Dal in Parliament	
17 December 1991 – 10 May 1996	Member, Railways Convention Committee	
8 April 1993 – 10 May 1996	Chairman, Committee on Agriculture	
1996	Re-elected to 11th Lok Sabha. Member, Committee on Estimates. Member, General Purposes Committee. Member, Joint Committee on the Constitution (Eighty-first Amendment Bill, 1996)	3rd term in Lok Sabha
1996–98	Member, Committee on Defence	
1998	Re-elected to 12th Lok Sabha	4th term in Lok Sabha
19 March 1998 – 5 August 1999	Union Cabinet Minister, Railways	
14 April 1998 – 5 August 1999	Union Cabinet Minister, Surface Transport (additional charge)	
1999	Re-elected to 13th Lok Sabha	5th term in Lok Sabha
13 October 1999 – 22 November 1999	Union Cabinet Minister, Surface Transport	
22 November 1999 – 3 March 2000	Union Cabinet Minister, Agriculture	
March 2000 – March 2000	Chief Minister, Bihar	as 29th Chief Minister of Bihar, only for 7 days
27 May 2000 – 20 March 2001	Union Cabinet Minister, Agriculture	
20 March 2001 – 21 July 2001	Union Cabinet Minister, Agriculture, with an additional charge of Railways	
22 July 2001 – 21 May 2004	Union Cabinet Minister, Railways	
2004	Re-elected to 14th Lok Sabha, from Nalanda. Member, Committee on Coal & Steel. Member, General Purposes Committee. Member, Committee of Privileges. Leader Janata Dal (U) Parliamentary Party, Lok Sabha	6th term in Lok Sabha
November 2005 – November 2010	Chief Minister, Bihar	as 31st Chief Minister of Bihar
2006	Elected to Bihar Vidhan Parishad, First term	
November 2010 – May 2014	Chief Minister, Bihar	as 32nd Chief Minister of Bihar
2012	Elected to Bihar Vidhan Parishad, Second term	
February 2015 – November 2015	Chief Minister, Bihar	as 34th Chief Minister of Bihar
November 2015 – July 2017	Chief Minister, Bihar	as 35th Chief Minister of Bihar
July 2017 – 16 November 2020	Chief Minister, Bihar	as 36th Chief Minister of Bihar
2018	Elected to Bihar Vidhan Parishad, Third term	
16 November 2020 – 10 August 2022	Chief Minister, Bihar	as 37th Chief Minister of Bihar
10 August 2022 – January 2024	Chief Minister, Bihar	as 38th Chief Minister of Bihar
31 January 2024 – November 2025	Chief Minister, Bihar	as 39th Chief Minister of Bihar
2024	Elected to Bihar Vidhan Parishad, Fourth term	
November 2025 – April 2026	Chief Minister, Bihar	as 40th Chief Minister of Bihar
March 2026 –	Member of Parliament, Rajya Sabha	1st term in the Rajya Sabha

== Political affiliations ==
Political affiliation of Nitish Kumar
Political Party	Alliance	From	To
Janata Dal	None	1989	1994
Samata Party	None	1994	1998
Samata Party	NDA	1998	2003
JD(U)	NDA	2003	2013
JD(U)	Mahagathbandhan (UPA)	2015	2017
JD(U)	NDA	2017	2022
JD(U)	Mahagathbandhan (UPA)	2022	2023
JD(U)	I.N.D.I.A.	2023	2024
JD(U)	NDA	2024	Present

== See also ==
- Ganga Water Lift Project – Drinking water project in Bihar, India
- List of politicians from Bihar
- Pragati Yatra

Political offices
Preceded by Rabri Devi	Chief Minister of Bihar; 3 March 2000 – 10 March 2000	Succeeded by Rabri Devi
Preceded by President's rule	Chief Minister of Bihar; 24 November 2005 – 17 May 2014	Succeeded by Jitan Ram Manjhi
Preceded by Jitan Ram Manjhi	Chief Minister of Bihar; 22 February 2015 – 15 April 2026	Succeeded by Samrat Chaudhary
