= List of district courts in India =

There are total 743 district courts in India. There are also 25 high courts in the country. The complete list of District courts in India is as follows:

== States ==
=== Andhra Pradesh (13) ===
- Anantapur
- Chittoor
- East Godavari (Rajahmundry)
- Guntur
- Krishna (Machilipatnam)
- Kurnool
- Prakasam
- Srikakulam
- Sri Potti Sriramulu (Nellore)
- Visakhapatnam
- Vizianagaram
- West Godavari (Eluru)
- YSR Kadapa

=== Arunachal Pradesh (16) ===
- Anjaw
- Changlang
- Dibang Valley
- East Kameng
- East Siang
- Kurung Kumey
- Lohit
- Lower Dibang Valley
- Lower Subansiri
- Papum Pare
- Tawang
- Tirap
- Upper Siang
- Upper Subansiri
- West Kameng
- West Siang

=== Assam (27) ===
- Baksa
- Barpeta
- Bongaigaon
- Cachar
- Chirang
- Darrang
- Dhemaji
- Dhubri
- Dibrugarh
- Dima Hasao
- Goalpara
- Golaghat
- Hailakandi
- Jorhat
- Kamrup Metro
- Kamrup Amingaon
- Karimganj
- Karbi Anglong
- Kokrajhar
- Lakhimpur
- Morigaon
- Nagaon
- Nalbari
- Sivasagar
- Sonitpur
- Tinsukia
- Udalguri

=== Bihar (37) ===
- Araria
- Aurangabad
- Banka
- Begusarai
- Bhagalpur
- Bhojpur
- Buxar
- Darbhanga
- East Champaran
- Gaya
- Gopalganj
- Jamui
- Jehanabad
- Kaimur (Bhabhua)
- Katihar
- Khagaria
- Kishanganj
- Lakhisarai
- Madhepura
- Madhubani
- Munger
- Muzaffarpur
- Nalanda
- Nawada
- Patna
- Purnea
- Rohtas (Sasaram Nagar)
- Saharsa
- Samastipur
- Saran
- Sheikhpura
- Sheohar
- Sitamarhi
- Siwan
- Supaul
- Vaishali
- West Champaran

=== Chhattisgarh (25) ===
- Balod
- Baloda Bazar
- Balrampur
- Bastar
- Bemetara
- Bijapur
- Bilaspur
- Dhamtari
- Durg
- Garibandh
- Janjgir-Champa
- Jashpur
- Kabirdham-Kawardha
- Kondagaon
- Korba
- Korea
- Mahasamund
- Mungeli
- North Bastar-Kanked
- Raigarh
- Raipur
- Rajnandgaon
- South Bastar-Dantewada
- Surajpur
- Surguja
- korba

=== Goa (2) ===
- North Goa
- South Goa

=== Gujarat (33) ===
- Ahmedabad - City Civil & Sessions Court
- Ahmedabad - Chief Judicial Magistrate Court
- Ahmedabad - Small Causes Court
- Ahmedabad (Rural)
- Amreli
- Anand
- Aravalli
- Banaskantha
- Bharuch
- Bhavnagar
- Botad
- Chhota Udepur
- Dahod
- Dang
- Devbhumi Dwarka
- Gandhinagar
- Gir Somnath
- Jamnagar
- Junagadh
- Kheda
- Kutch
- Mahisagar
- Mehsana
- Morbi
- Narmada
- Navsari
- Panchmahals
- Patan
- Porbandar
- Rajkot
- Sabarkantha
- Surat
- Surendranagar
- Tapi
- Vadodara
- Valsad

=== Haryana (22) ===
- Ambala
- Bhiwani
- Faridabad
- Fatehabad
- Gurgaon
- Hisar
- Jhajjar
- Jind
- Kaithal
- Karnal
- Kurukshetra
- Narnaul
- Mewat
- Palwal
- Panchkula
- Panipat
- Rewari
- Rohtak
- Sirsa
- Sonipat
- Yamunanagar

=== Himachal Pradesh (11) ===
- Bilaspur
- Chamba
- Hamirpur
- Kangra
- Kinnaur
- Kullu
- Mandi
- Shimla
- Sirmaur
- Solan
- Una

=== Jharkhand (24) ===
- Bokaro
- Chatra
- Deoghar
- Dhanbad
- Dumka
- East Singhbhum
- Garhwa
- Giridih
- Godda
- Gumla
- Hazaribagh
- Jamtara
- Khunti
- Koderma
- Latehar
- Lohardaga
- Pakur
- Palamu
- Ramgarh
- Ranchi
- Sahibganj
- Seraikela-Kharsawan
- Simdega
- West Singhbhum

=== Karnataka (30) ===
- Bagalkot
- Ballari
- Belagavi
- Bengaluru
- Bengaluru Rural
- Bidar
- Chamrajnagar
- Chikballapur
- Chikkamagaluru
- Chitradurga
- Dakshina Kannada
- Davangere
- Dharwad
- Gadag
- Hassan
- Haveri
- Kalaburagi
- Kodagu
- Kolar
- Koppal
- Mandya
- Mysuru
- Raichur
- Ramnagar
- Shivamogga
- Tumakuru
- Udupi
- Uttara Kannada
- Vijayapura
- Yadgir

=== Kerala (14) ===
- Alappuzha
- Ernakulam
- Idukki
- Kannur
- Kasargod
- Kollam
- Kottayam
- Kozhikode
- Malappuram
- Palakkad
- Pathanamthitta
- Thiruvananthapuram
- Thrissur
- Wayanad

=== Madhya Pradesh (50) ===
- Alirajpur
- Anuppur
- Ashoknagar
- Balaghat
- Barwani
- Betul
- Bhind
- Bhopal
- Burhanpur
- Chhatarpur
- Chhindwara
- Damoh
- Datia
- Dewas
- Dhar
- Dindori
- Guna
- Gwalior
- Harda
- Hoshangabad
- Indore
- Jabalpur
- Jhabua
- Katni
- Khandwa
- Khargone
- Mandla
- Mandsaur
- Morena
- Narsinghpur
- Neemuch
- Panna
- Raisen
- Rajgarh
- Ratlam
- Rewa
- Sagar
- Satna
- Sehore
- Seoni
- Shahdol
- Shajapur
- Sheopur
- Shivpuri
- Sidhi
- Singrauli
- Tikamgarh
- Ujjain
- Umaria
- Vidisha

=== Maharashtra (39) ===
- Ahmadnagar
- Akola
- Amravati
- Aurangabad
- Beed
- Bhandara
- Buldhana
- Chandrapur
- Dhule
- Gadchiroli
- Gondia
- Jalgaon
- Jalna
- Kolhapur
- Latur
- Maharashtra CoOperative Courts
- Maharashtra Family Courts
- Maharashtra Industrial/Labour Courts
- Mumbai City Civil Court
- Mumbai CMM Court
- Mumbai Motor/Accident Claims Tribunal
- Mumbai Small Cause Court
- Nagpur
- Nanded
- Nandurbar
- Nashik
- Osmanabad
- Parbhani
- Pune
- Raigad
- Ratnagiri
- Sangli
- Satara
- Sindhudurg
- Solapur
- Thane
- Wardha
- Washim
- Yavatmal
- Mumbai

=== Manipur (7) ===
- Bishnupur
- Churachandpur
- Imphal East
- Imphal West
- Senapati
- Thoubal
- Ukhrul

=== Meghalaya (7) ===
- East Garo Hills
- East Khasi Hills
- Jaintia Hills
- Ri-Bhoi
- South West Garo Hills
- West Garo Hills
- West Khasi Hills

=== Mizoram (8) ===
- Aizawl
- Champhai
- Kolasib
- Lawngtlai
- Lunglei
- Mamit
- Saiha
- Serchhip

=== Nagaland (11) ===
- Dimapur
- Kohima
- Kiphire
- Longleng
- Mokokchung
- Mon
- Peren
- Phek
- Tuensang
- Wokha
- Zunheboto

=== Odisha (30) ===
- Angul
- Balangir
- Balasore
- Bargarh
- Bhadrak
- Boudh
- Cuttack
- Deogarh
- Dhenkanal
- Gajapati
- Ganjam
- Jagatsinghapur
- Jajpur
- Jharsuguda
- Kalahandi
- Kandhamal
- Kendrapara
- Kendujhar
- Khordha
- Koraput
- Malkangiri
- Mayurbhanj
- Nabarangpur
- Nayagarh
- Nuapada
- Puri
- Rayagada
- Sambalpur
- Subarnapur
- Sundargarh

=== Punjab (22) ===
- Amritsar
- Barnala
- Bathinda
- Faridkot
- Fatehgarh Sahib
- Fazilka
- Ferozepur
- Gurdaspur
- Hoshiarpur
- Jalandhar
- Kapurthala
- Ludhiana
- Mansa
- Moga
- Muktsar
- Nawanshahr
- Pathankot
- Patiala
- Rupnagar
- Sangrur
- SAS Nagar
- Tarn Taran

=== Rajasthan (33) ===
- Ajmer
- Alwar
- Banswara
- Baran
- Barmer
- Bharatpur
- Bhilwara
- Bikaner
- Bundi
- Chittorgarh
- Churu
- Dausa
- Dholpur
- Dungarpur
- Hanumangarh
- Jaipur
- Jaisalmer
- Jalor
- Jhalawar
- Jhunjhunu
- Jodhpur
- Karauli
- Kota
- Nagaur
- Pali
- Pratapgarh
- Rajsamand
- Sawai Madhopur
- Sikar
- Sirohi
- Sri Ganganagar
- Tonk
- Udaipur

=== Sikkim (4) ===
- East Sikkim
- North Sikkim
- South Sikkim
- West Sikkim

=== Tamil Nadu (32) ===
- Ariyalur
- Chennai
- Coimbatore
- Cuddalore
- Dharmapuri
- Dindigul
- Erode
- Kanchipuram
- Kanyakumari
- Karur
- Krishnagiri
- Madurai
- Nagapattinam
- Namakkal
- Perambalur
- Pudukottai
- Ramanathapuram
- Salem
- Sivaganga
- Thanjavur
- The Nilgiris
- Theni
- Thoothukudi
- Tiruchirappalli
- Tirunelveni
- Tiruppur
- Tiruvallur
- Tiruvannamalai
- Tiruvarur
- Vellore
- Villuppuram
- Virudhunagar

=== Telangana (12) ===
- Adilabad
- Hyderabad- City Civil Court
- Hyderabad- City Small Cause Court
- Hyderabad- Metropolitan Sessions Court
- Karimnagar
- Khammam
- Mahabubnagar
- Medak
- Nalgonda
- Nizamabad
- Ranga Reddy
- Warangal
- District Court Wanaparthy
- District Court Gadwal

=== Tripura (8) ===
- Dhalai
- Gomati
- Khowai
- North Tripura
- Sepahijala
- South Tripura
- Unakoti
- West Tripura

=== Uttar Pradesh (75) ===
- Agra
- Aligarh
- Allahabad
- Ambedkar Nagar
- Amethi
- Amroha
- Auraiya
- Azamgarh
- Baghpat
- Bahraich
- Ballia
- Balrampur
- Banda
- Barabanki
- Bareilly
- Basti
- Bhadohi
- Bijnor
- Budaun
- Bulandshahar
- Chandauli
- Chitrakoot
- Deoria
- Etah
- Etawah
- Faizabad
- Farrukhabad
- Fatehpur
- Firozabad
- Gautam Budh Nagar
- Ghaziabad
- Ghazipur
- Gonda
- Gorakhpur
- Hamirpur
- Hapur
- Hardoi
- Hathras
- Jalaun
- Jaunpur
- Jhansi
- Kannauj
- Kanpur Dehat
- Kanpur Nagar
- Kasganj
- Kaushambi
- Kushinagar
- Lakhimpur Kheri
- Lalitpur
- Lucknow
- Maharajganj
- Mahoba
- Mainpuri
- Mathura
- Mau
- Meerut
- Mirzapur
- Moradabad
- Muzaffarnagar
- Pilibhit
- Pratapgarh
- Raebareli
- Rampur
- Saharanpur
- Sambhal
- Sant Kabir Nagar
- Shahjahanpur
- Shamli
- Shravasti
- Siddhartha Nagar
- Sitapur
- Sonbhadra
- Sultanpur
- Unnao
- Varanasi

=== Uttarakhand (13) ===
- Almora
- Bageshwar
- Chamoli
- Champawat
- Dehradun
- Haridwar
- Nainital
- Pauri Garhwal
- Pithoragarh
- Rudraprayag
- Tehri Garhwal
- Udham Singh Nagar
- Uttarkashi

=== West Bengal (25) ===
- Alipurduar
- Bankura
- Birbhum
- Cooch Behar
- Darjeeling
- East Bardhaman
- East Medinipur
- Hooghly
- Howrah
- Jalpaiguri
- Jhargram
- Kalimpong
- Kolkata-City Civil Court
- Kolkata-City Sessions Court
- Kolkata-Presidency Small Causes Court
- Malda
- Murshidabad
- Nadia
- North 24 Parganas
- North Dinajpur
- Purulia
- South 24 Parganas
- South Dinajpur
- West Bardhaman
- West Medinipur

== Union territories ==
=== Andaman and Nicobar Islands (3) ===
- Nicobar
- North and Middle Andaman
- South Andaman

=== Chandigarh (1) ===
- Chandigarh

=== Dadra and Nagar Haveli, Daman and Diu (3) ===
- Dadra and Nagar Haveli
- Daman
- Diu

=== Delhi (11) ===
- Central Delhi
- East Delhi
- New Delhi
- North Delhi
- North East Delhi
- North West Delhi
- Shahdara Delhi
- South Delhi
- South East Delhi
- South West Delhi
- West Delhi

=== Jammu and Kashmir (20) ===
- Anantnag
- Badgam
- Bandipora
- Baramula
- Doda
- Ganderbal
- Jammu
- Kathua
- Kishtwar
- Kulgam
- Kupwara
- Poonch
- Pulwama
- Rajouri
- Ramban
- Reasi
- Samba
- Shopian
- Srinagar
- Udhampur

=== Ladakh (2) ===
- Leh
- Kargil

=== Lakshadweep (1) ===
- Lakshadweep

=== Puducherry (4) ===
- Karaikal
- Mahe
- Pondicherry
- Yanam
