= 2025 Bihar Legislative Assembly election =

Election in India

- November 6, 2025 and November 11, 2025

All 243 seats in the Bihar Legislative Assembly 122 seats needed for a majority
- Opinion polls
- Registered: 74,355,976 (▲3.5%)
- Turnout: 67.25% (▲9.96 pp)
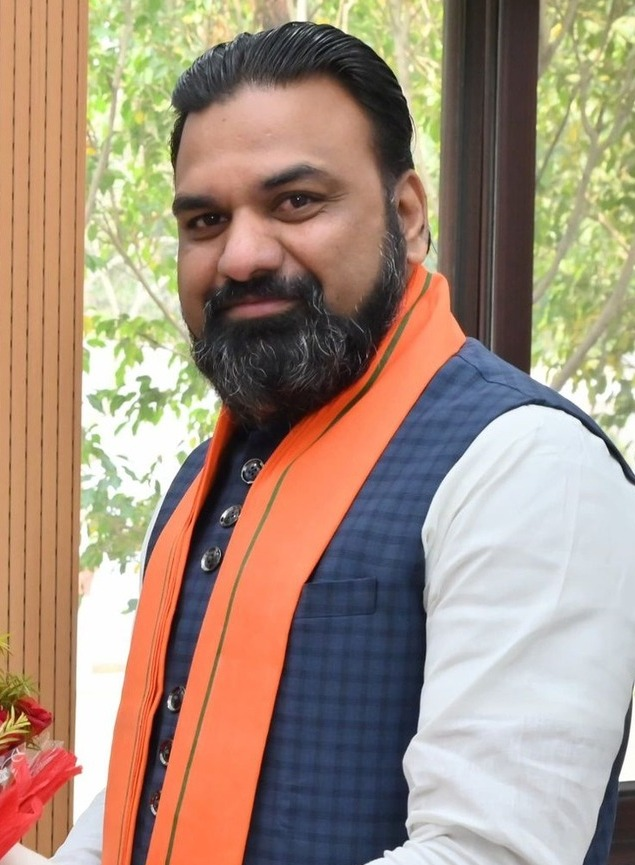

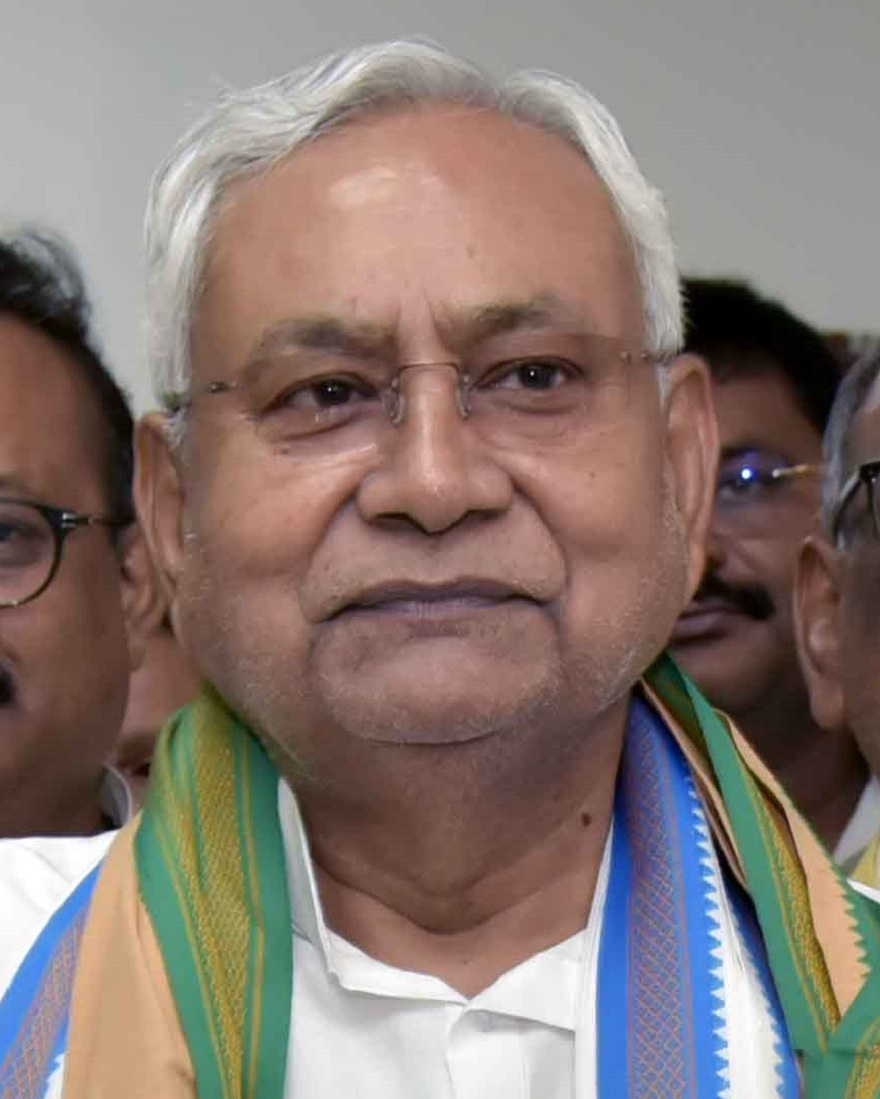

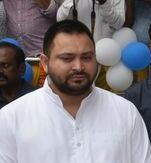

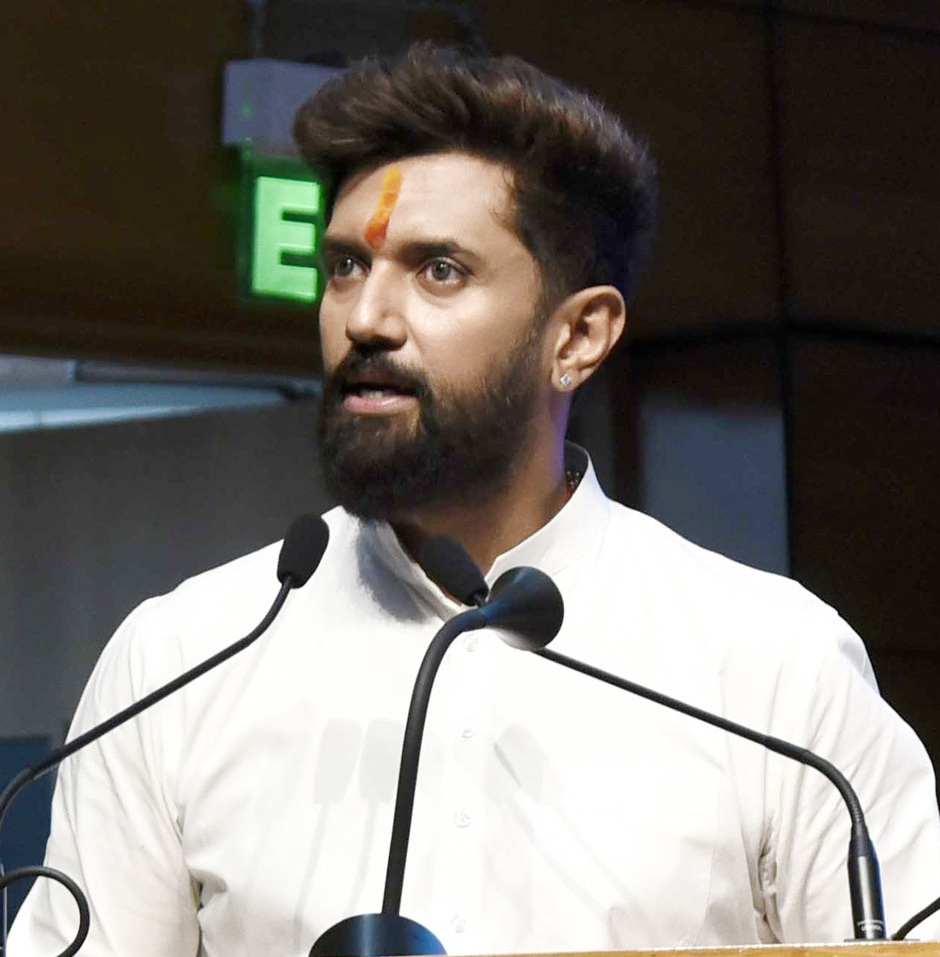

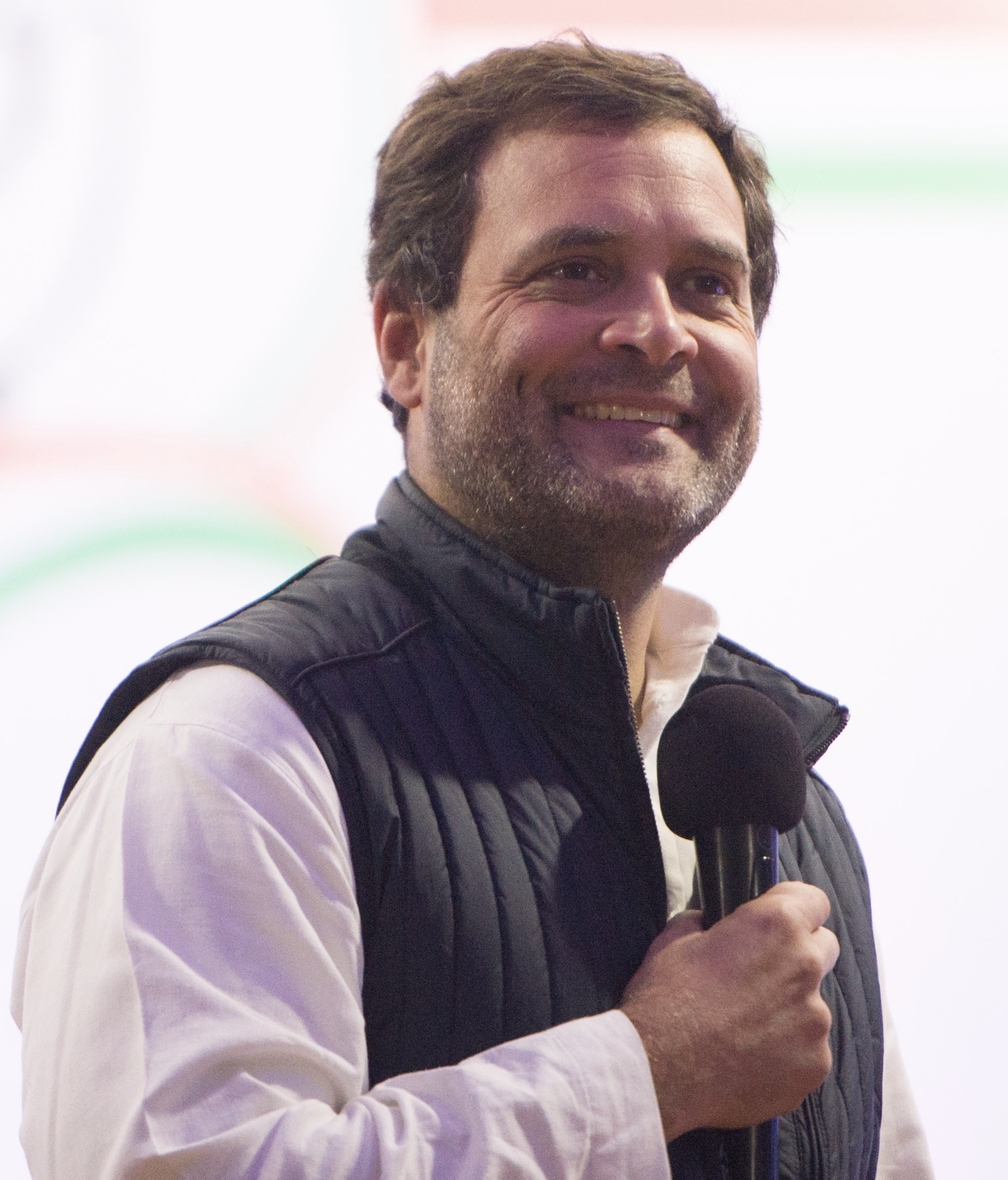

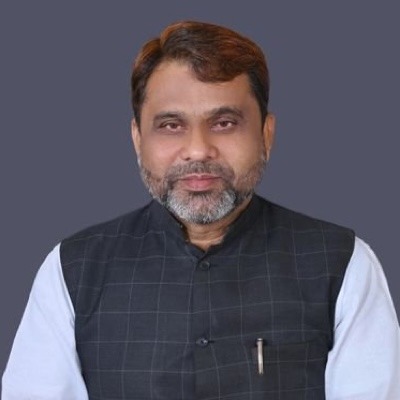
	Majority party	Minority party	Third party
Leader	Samrat Choudhary	Nitish Kumar	Tejashwi Yadav
Party	BJP	JD(U)	RJD
Alliance	NDA	NDA	MGB
Leader since	2015	2005	2017
Leader's seat	Tarapur (Won)	MLC (did not contest)	Raghopur (Won)
Last election	19.46%, 74 seats	15.39%, 43 seats	23.11%, 75 seats
Seats won	89	85	25
Seat change	▲15	▲42	▼50
Popular vote	10,081,143	9,667,118	11,546,055
Percentage	20.08%	19.25%	23.00%
Swing	▲0.62 pp	▲3.86 pp	▼0.11 pp
	Fourth party	Fifth party	Sixth party
Leader	Chirag Paswan	Rahul Gandhi	Akhtarul Iman
Party	LJP(RV)	INC	AIMIM
Alliance	NDA	MGB	GDA
Leader since	2021	2025	2015
Leader's seat	Did not contest	"Did not contest" (Note: Won in Rae Bareli in 2024 Indian general election)	Amour (Won)
Last election	Party did not exist (Note: Being in BJP)	9.48%, 19 seats	1.24%, 5 seats
Seats won	19	6	5
Seat change	▲19	▼13	Steady
Popular vote	2,497,358	4,374,579	930,504
Percentage	4.97%	8.71%	1.85%
Swing	▲4.97 pp	▼0.77 pp	▲0.19 pp

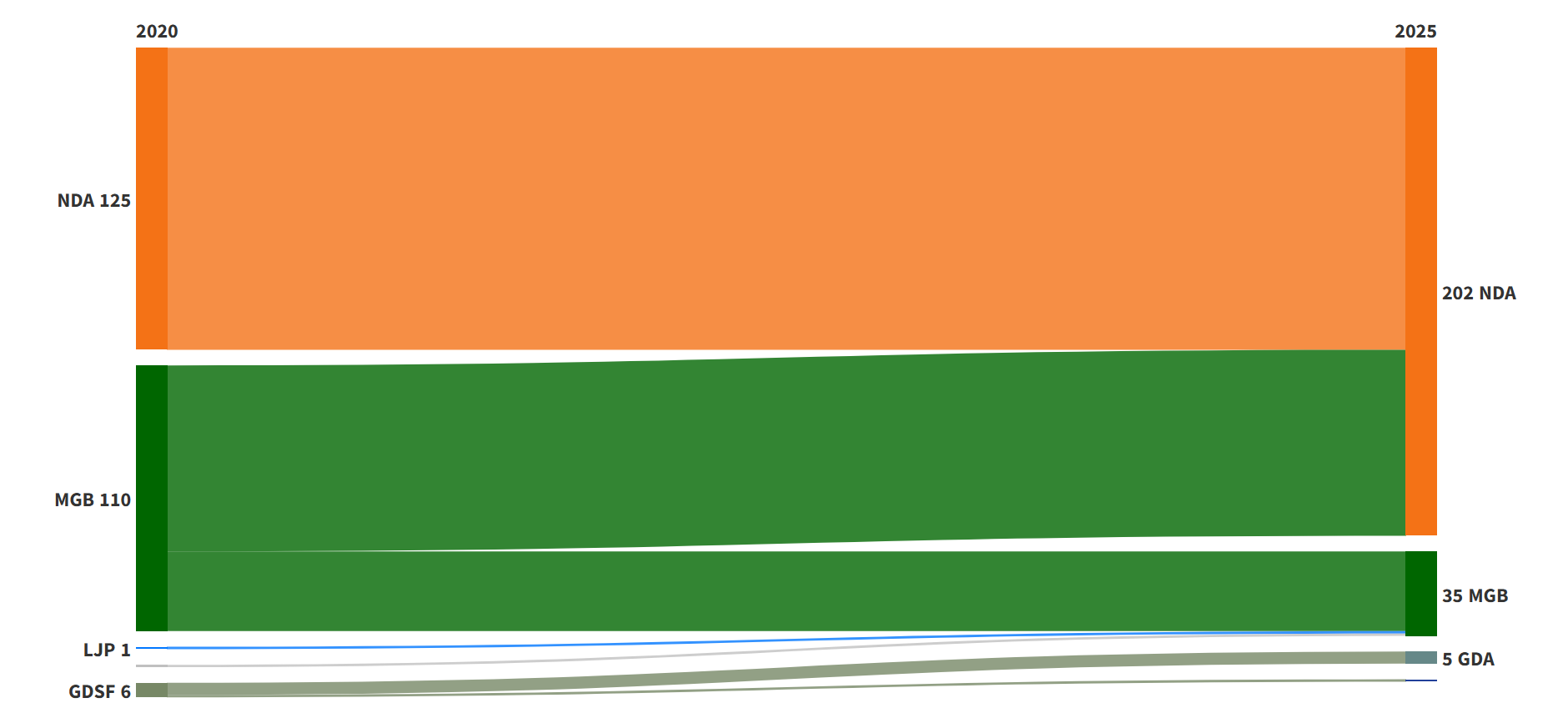
- Sankey Diagram of 2025 elections in comparison to 2020 elections
Chief Minister before election
Nitish Kumar
JD(U)
Elected Chief Minister
Samrat Choudhary
BJP

Legislative Assembly elections were held in Bihar to elect the 243 members of the Bihar Legislative Assembly. The votes were counted and the results were declared on 14 November 2025.

The Bharatiya Janata Party (BJP)-led National Democratic Alliance (NDA) won a landslide victory securing 202 of the 243 seats in which the election was held, defeating the Rashtriya Janata Dal (RJD)-led Mahagathbandhan (MGB) which secured just 35 seats. Incumbent chief minister Nitish Kumar took the oath for a record tenth time. Incumbent deputy chief ministers Samrat Chaudhary and Vijay Kumar Sinha took the oath as the deputy chief ministers for the second consecutive time. 5 months after he was sworn in, Nitish Kumar resigned as the chief minister upon his election to the Rajya Sabha and was succeeded by his deputy Samrat Chaudhary, who became the first BJP chief minister of the state. Vijay Kumar Chaudhary and Bijendra Prasad Yadav were sworn in as the deputy chief ministers.

For the first time, the BJP became the single largest party in Bihar assembly. The RJD, led by Tejashwi Yadav, fell to third for the first time since 2010, while Kumar's Janata Dal (United) recorded its best result since 2010. The Indian National Congress (INC) fared poorly in the election, while the Lok Janshakti Party (Ram Vilas) and Rashtriya Lok Morcha secured seats for the first time.

== Background ==
The tenure of Bihar Legislative Assembly is scheduled to end on 22 March 2025. The previous assembly elections were held in October–November 2020. After the election, the National Democratic Alliance formed the state government, with Nitish Kumar becoming Chief Minister.

On 9 August 2022, the JD(U) ended its alliance with the BJP and Nitish Kumar resigned as Chief Minister. On 10 August 2022, JD(U) joined the Mahagathbandhan alliance with the RJD and the INC, with Nitish Kumar again taking oath as Chief Minister of the state.

In January 2024, the JD(U) ended its alliance with Mahagathbandhan and Nitish Kumar resigned as Chief Minister. He formed the new government with BJP-led NDA and was sworn in as the Chief Minister again.

== Schedule ==
The Election Commission of India announced the schedule for the Bihar Legislative Assembly election on 6 October 2025.

Phases of the Bihar Legislative Assembly election

Poll event	Phases	
Poll event	I	II
Notification date	10 October 2025	13 October 2025
Last date for filing nomination	17 October 2025	20 October 2025
Scrutiny of nomination	18 October 2025	21 October 2025
Last date for withdrawal of nomination	20 October 2025	23 October 2025
Date of poll	6 November 2025	11 November 2025
Date of counting of votes	14 November 2025	
Number of constituencies	243 seats	

== Parties and alliances ==
=== National Democratic Alliance ===
2025 Bihar Legislative Assembly Election NDA Seat Sharing Map

National Democratic Alliance
Party	Flag	Symbol	Leader	Seats contested
Bharatiya Janata Party			Samrat Choudhary	101
Janata Dal (United)			Nitish Kumar	101
Lok Janshakti Party (Ram Vilas)			Chirag Paswan	28 (Note: Nomination of LJP(RV) candidate Seema Singh from Marhaura constituency was rejected.)
Hindustani Awam Morcha			Jitan Ram Manjhi	6
Rashtriya Lok Morcha			Upendra Kushwaha	6
Independent			Ankit Kumar	1 (Note: NDA extended its support to Independent candidate Ankit Kumar from Marhaura constituency after nomination of LJP(RV) candidate Seema Singh was rejected.)
Total				243

=== Mahagathbandhan ===
On 23 October 2025, Tejashwi Yadav was announced as the Chief Ministerial face of the Mahagathbandhan for the election, with Mukesh Sahani being the Deputy CM face.

2025 Bihar Legislative Assembly Election MGB Seat Sharing Map

Mahagathbandhan
Party	Flag	Symbol	Leader	Seats contested
Rashtriya Janata Dal			Tejashwi Yadav	143 (Note: Nomination of RJD candidate Shweta Suman from Mohania constituency was rejected.) (Note: Although RJD had given the Gaura Bauram constituency to VIP as per seat sharing agreement, RJD’s Afzal Ali Khan refused to withdraw and surrender RJD symbol, ultimately contesting as an RJD candidate. RJD and Mahagathbandhan allies supported VIP candidate Santosh Sahani from the constituency.)
Indian National Congress			Rajesh Kumar	61
Communist Party of India (Marxist–Leninist) Liberation			Mahbub Alam	20
Vikassheel Insaan Party			Mukesh Sahani	12 (Note: Nomination of VIP candidate Shashi Bhushan Singh from Sugauli constituency was rejected.) (Note: Nomination of VIP candidate Ganesh Bharti from Kusheshwar Asthan constituency was rejected, he contested as an independent from the same constituency.)
Communist Party of India			Ram Naresh Pandey	9
Communist Party of India (Marxist)			Ajay Kumar Kushwaha	4
Indian Inclusive Party			Indrajeet Prasad Gupta	3
Janshakti Janata Dal			Shyam Kishore Chaudhary	1 (Note: Mahagathbandhan extended its support to JJD candidate Shyam Kishore Chaudhary from Sugauli constituency after nomination of VIP candidate Shashi Bhushan Singh was rejected.)
Independents			Ravi Shankar Paswan	1 (Note: Mahagathbandhan extended its support to Independent candidate Ravi Paswan from Mohania constituency after nomination of RJD candidate Shweta Suman was rejected.)
Independents			Ganesh Bharti	1
Total				243 (Note: Mahagathbandhan alliance partners had friendly contests in 12 constituencies.)

=== Grand Democratic Alliance ===
Grand Democratic Alliance
Party	Flag	Symbol	Leader	Seats contested
Rashtriya Lok Janshakti Party			Pashupati Kumar Paras	36
All India Majlis-e-Ittehadul Muslimeen			Akhtarul Iman	28
Aazad Samaj Party (Kanshi Ram)			Jauhar Azad	18
Apni Janata Party			Swami Prasad Maurya	3
Total				79

=== Others ===
Party	Flag	Symbol	Leader	Seats contested
Jan Suraaj Party			Prashant Kishor	238
Bahujan Samaj Party			Shankar Mahato	181
Aam Aadmi Party			Rakesh Yadav	83
Janshakti Janata Dal			Tej Pratap Yadav	45 (Note: Mahagathbandhan extended its support to JJD candidate Shyam Kishore Chaudhary from Sugauli constituency after nomination of VIP candidate Shashi Bhushan Singh was rejected.)

== Candidates ==
Voting Date	District	Constituency		NDA		MGB (Note: Mahagathbandhan alliance partners had friendly contests in 12 constituencies.)	
Voting Date	District	#	Name	Party	Candidate	Party	Candidate
11 November 2025	West Champaran	1	Valmiki Nagar	JD(U)	Dhirendra Pratap Singh	INC	Surendra Prasad Kushwaha
11 November 2025	West Champaran	2	Ramnagar (SC)	BJP	Nand Kishor Ram	RJD	Subodh Paswan
11 November 2025	West Champaran	3	Narkatiaganj	BJP	Sanjay Pandey	INC	Shaswat Kedar Pandey
11 November 2025	West Champaran	3	Narkatiaganj	BJP	Sanjay Pandey	RJD	Deepak Yadav
11 November 2025	West Champaran	4	Bagaha	BJP	Ram Singh	INC	Jayesh Mangal Singh
11 November 2025	West Champaran	5	Lauriya	BJP	Vinay Bihari	VIP	Ran Kaushal Pratap Singh
11 November 2025	West Champaran	6	Nautan	BJP	Narayan Prasad	INC	Amit Giri
11 November 2025	West Champaran	7	Chanpatia	BJP	Umakant Singh	INC	Abhishek Ranjan
11 November 2025	West Champaran	8	Bettiah	BJP	Renu Devi	INC	Wasi Ahmed
11 November 2025	West Champaran	9	Sikta	JD(U)	Sammridh Varma	CPI(ML)L	Birendra Prasad Gupta
11 November 2025	East Champaran	10	Raxaul	BJP	Pramod Kumar Sinha	INC	Shyam Bihari Prasad
11 November 2025	East Champaran	11	Sugauli	LJP(RV)	Rajesh Kumar	JJD	Shyam Kishore Chaudhary
11 November 2025	East Champaran	12	Narkatiya	JD(U)	Vishal Shah	RJD	Shamim Ahmad
11 November 2025	East Champaran	13	Harsidhi (SC)	BJP	Krishnanandan Paswan	RJD	Rajendra Kumar Ram
11 November 2025	East Champaran	14	Govindganj	LJP(RV)	Raju Tiwari	INC	Shashi Bhushan Rai
11 November 2025	East Champaran	15	Kesaria	JD(U)	Shalini Mishra	VIP	Varun Vijay
11 November 2025	East Champaran	16	Kalyanpur	BJP	Sachindra Prasad Singh	RJD	Manoj Kumar Yadav
11 November 2025	East Champaran	17	Pipra	BJP	Shyambabu Prasad Yadav	CPI(M)	Raj Mangal Prasad
11 November 2025	East Champaran	18	Madhuban	BJP	Rana Randhir Singh	RJD	Sandhya Rani Kushwaha
11 November 2025	East Champaran	19	Motihari	BJP	Pramod Kumar	RJD	Dewa Gupta
11 November 2025	East Champaran	20	Chiraia	BJP	Lal Babu Prasad Gupta	RJD	Lakshmi Narayan Yadav
11 November 2025	East Champaran	21	Dhaka	BJP	Pawan Jaiswal	RJD	Faisal Rahman
11 November 2025	Sheohar	22	Sheohar	JD(U)	Shweta Gupta	RJD	Navneet Kumar
11 November 2025	Sitamarhi	23	Riga	BJP	Baidyanath Prasad	INC	Amit Kumar Tunna
11 November 2025	Sitamarhi	24	Bathnaha (SC)	BJP	Anil Kumar Ram	INC	Navin Kumar
11 November 2025	Sitamarhi	25	Parihar	BJP	Gayatri Devi	RJD	Smita Purve Gupta
11 November 2025	Sitamarhi	26	Sursand	JD(U)	Nagendra Raut	RJD	Syed Abu Dojana
11 November 2025	Sitamarhi	27	Bajpatti	RLM	Rameshwar Mahto	RJD	Mukesh Yadav
11 November 2025	Sitamarhi	28	Sitamarhi	BJP	Sunil Kumar Pintu	RJD	Sunil Kushwaha
11 November 2025	Sitamarhi	29	Runnisaidpur	JD(U)	Pankaj Kumar Mishra	RJD	Chandan Kumar
11 November 2025	Sitamarhi	30	Belsand	LJP(RV)	Amit Kumar	RJD	Sanjay Gupta
11 November 2025	Madhubani	31	Harlakhi	JD(U)	Sudhanshu Shekhar	CPI	Rakesh Kumar Pandey
11 November 2025	Madhubani	32	Benipatti	BJP	Vinod Narayan Jha	INC	Nalini Ranjan Jha
11 November 2025	Madhubani	33	Khajauli	BJP	Arun Shankar Prasad	RJD	Braj Kishore Yadav
11 November 2025	Madhubani	34	Babubarhi	JD(U)	Mina Kumari	RJD	Arun Kushwaha
11 November 2025	Madhubani	35	Bisfi	BJP	Haribhushan Thakur	RJD	Asif Ahmad
11 November 2025	Madhubani	36	Madhubani	RLM	Madhav Anand	RJD	Samir Kumar Mahaseth
11 November 2025	Madhubani	37	Rajnagar (SC)	BJP	Sujeet Paswan	RJD	Bishnudeo Mochi
11 November 2025	Madhubani	38	Jhanjharpur	BJP	Nitish Mishra	CPI	Ram Narayan Yadav
11 November 2025	Madhubani	39	Phulparas	JD(U)	Sheela Kumari	INC	Subodh Mandal
11 November 2025	Madhubani	40	Laukaha	JD(U)	Satish Kumar Sah	RJD	Bharat Bhushan Mandal
11 November 2025	Supaul	41	Nirmali	JD(U)	Aniruddha Prasad Yadav	RJD	Baijnath Mehta
11 November 2025	Supaul	42	Pipra (Supaul)	JD(U)	Rambilash Kamat	CPI(ML)L	Anil Kumar
11 November 2025	Supaul	43	Supaul	JD(U)	Bijendra Prasad Yadav	INC	Minnat Rahmani
11 November 2025	Supaul	44	Triveniganj (SC)	JD(U)	Sonam Rani Sardar	RJD	Santosh Sardar
11 November 2025	Supaul	45	Chhatapur	BJP	Neeraj Kumar	RJD	Dr. Vipin Kumar Nonia
11 November 2025	Araria	46	Narpatganj	BJP	Devanti Yadav	RJD	Manish Yadav
11 November 2025	Araria	47	Raniganj (SC)	JD(U)	Achmit Rishidev	RJD	Avinash Mangalam
11 November 2025	Araria	48	Forbesganj	BJP	Vidya Sagar Keshri	INC	Manoj Bishwas
11 November 2025	Araria	49	Araria	JD(U)	Shagufta Azim	INC	Avidur Rahman
11 November 2025	Araria	50	Jokihat	JD(U)	Manzar Alam	RJD	Mhd. Shahnawaz Alam
11 November 2025	Araria	51	Sikti	BJP	Vijay Kumar Mandal	VIP	Hari Narayan Pramanik
11 November 2025	Kishanganj	52	Bahadurganj	LJP(RV)	Mohammad Kalimuddin	INC	Maswar Alam
11 November 2025	Kishanganj	53	Thakurganj	JD(U)	Gopal Kumar Agarwal	RJD	Saud Alam
11 November 2025	Kishanganj	54	Kishanganj	BJP	Sweety Singh	INC	Qamrul Hoda
11 November 2025	Kishanganj	55	Kochadhaman	BJP	Bina Devi	RJD	Mujahid Alam
11 November 2025	Purnia	56	Amour	JD(U)	Saba Zafar	INC	Abdul Jalil Mastan
11 November 2025	Purnia	57	Baisi	BJP	Vinod Yadav	RJD	Abdus subhan
11 November 2025	Purnia	58	Kasba	LJP(RV)	Nitesh Kumar Singh	INC	Irfan Alam
11 November 2025	Purnia	59	Banmankhi (SC)	BJP	Krishna Kumar Rishi	INC	Devnarayan Rajak
11 November 2025	Purnia	60	Rupauli	JD(U)	Kaladhar Mandal	RJD	Bima Bharati
11 November 2025	Purnia	61	Dhamdaha	JD(U)	Leshi Singh	RJD	Santosh Kushwaha
11 November 2025	Purnia	62	Purnia	BJP	Vijay Kumar Khemka	INC	Jitender Yadav
11 November 2025	Katihar	63	Katihar	BJP	Tarkishore Prasad	VIP	Saurav Kumar Agarwal
11 November 2025	Katihar	64	Kadwa	JD(U)	Dulal Chandra Goswami	INC	Shakeel Ahmad Khan
11 November 2025	Katihar	65	Balrampur	LJP(RV)	Sangita Devi	CPI(ML)L	Mahbub Alam
11 November 2025	Katihar	66	Pranpur	BJP	Nisha Singh	RJD	Ishrat parween
11 November 2025	Katihar	67	Manihari (ST)	JD(U)	Shambhu Suman	INC	Manohar Prasad Singh
11 November 2025	Katihar	68	Barari	JD(U)	Vijay Singh Nishad	INC	Tauquir Alam
11 November 2025	Katihar	69	Korha (SC)	BJP	Kavita Devi	INC	Punam Paswan
6 November 2025	Madhepura	70	Alamnagar	JD(U)	Narendra Narayan Yadav	VIP	Nabin Kumar
6 November 2025	Madhepura	71	Bihariganj	JD(U)	Niranjan Kumar Mehta	RJD	Renu Kushawaha
6 November 2025	Madhepura	72	Singheshwar (SC)	JD(U)	Ramesh Rishidev	RJD	Chandrahas Chaupal
6 November 2025	Madhepura	73	Madhepura	JD(U)	Kavita Kumari Saha	RJD	Chandrashekhar Yadav
6 November 2025	Saharsa	74	Sonbarsha (SC)	JD(U)	Ratnesh Sada	INC	Sarita Devi
6 November 2025	Saharsa	75	Saharsa	BJP	Alok Ranjan Jha	IIP	Indrajeet Prasad Gupta
6 November 2025	Saharsa	76	Simri Bakhtiarpur	LJP(RV)	Sanjay Kumar Singh	RJD	Yusuf Salahuddin
6 November 2025	Saharsa	77	Mahishi	JD(U)	Gunjeshwar Sah	RJD	Gautam Krishna
6 November 2025	Darbhanga	78	Kusheshwar Asthan (SC)	JD(U)	Atirek Kumar	Ind	Ganesh Bharti (Note: Nomination of VIP candidate Ganesh Bharti from Kusheshwar Asthan constituency was rejected, he contested as an independent from the same constituency.)
6 November 2025	Darbhanga	79	Gaura Bauram	BJP	Sujit Kumar Singh	VIP	Santosh Sahani
6 November 2025	Darbhanga	79	Gaura Bauram	BJP	Sujit Kumar Singh	RJD	Afzal Ali Khan (Note: Although RJD had given the Gaura Bauram constituency to VIP as per seat sharing agreement, RJD’s Afzal Ali Khan refused to withdraw and surrender RJD symbol, ultimately contesting as an RJD candidate. RJD and Mahagathbandhan allies supported VIP candidate Santosh Sahani from the constituency.)
6 November 2025	Darbhanga	80	Benipur	JD(U)	Binay Kumar Choudhary	INC	Mithilesh Kumar Chaudhary
6 November 2025	Darbhanga	81	Alinagar	BJP	Maithili Thakur	RJD	Binod Mishra
6 November 2025	Darbhanga	82	Darbhanga Rural	JD(U)	Ishwar Mandal	RJD	Lalit Kumar Yadav
6 November 2025	Darbhanga	83	Darbhanga	BJP	Sanjay Saraogi	VIP	Umesh Sahani
6 November 2025	Darbhanga	84	Hayaghat	BJP	Ram Chandra Prasad	CPI(M)	Shyam Bharati
6 November 2025	Darbhanga	85	Bahadurpur	JD(U)	Madan Sahni	RJD	Bhola Yadav
6 November 2025	Darbhanga	86	Keoti	BJP	Murari Mohan Jha	RJD	Faraz Fatmi
6 November 2025	Darbhanga	87	Jale	BJP	Jibesh Kumar Mishra	INC	Rishi Mishra
6 November 2025	Muzaffarpur	88	Gaighat	JD(U)	Komal Singh	RJD	Niranjan Ray
6 November 2025	Muzaffarpur	89	Aurai	BJP	Rama Nishad	VIP	Bhogendar Sahani
6 November 2025	Muzaffarpur	90	Minapur	JD(U)	Ajay Kushwaha	RJD	Munna Yadav
6 November 2025	Muzaffarpur	91	Bochahan (SC)	LJP(RV)	Baby Kumari	RJD	Amar Kumar Paswan
6 November 2025	Muzaffarpur	92	Sakra (SC)	JD(U)	Aditya Kumar	INC	Umesh Ram
6 November 2025	Muzaffarpur	93	Kurhani	BJP	Kedar Prasad Gupta	RJD	Sunil Kumar Suman
6 November 2025	Muzaffarpur	94	Muzaffarpur	BJP	Ranjan Kumar	INC	Bijendra Chaudhary
6 November 2025	Muzaffarpur	95	Kanti	JD(U)	Ajit Kumar	RJD	Mohammad Israil Mansuri
6 November 2025	Muzaffarpur	96	Baruraj	BJP	Arun Kumar Singh	VIP	Rakesh Kumar
6 November 2025	Muzaffarpur	97	Paroo	RLM	Madan Chaudhary	RJD	Shankar Prasad Yadav
6 November 2025	Muzaffarpur	98	Sahebganj	BJP	Raju Kumar Singh	RJD	Prithvinath Ray
6 November 2025	Gopalganj	99	Baikunthpur	BJP	Mithlesh Tiwari	RJD	Prem Shankar Prasad
6 November 2025	Gopalganj	100	Barauli	JD(U)	Manjeet Kumar Singh	RJD	Dilip Kumar Singh
6 November 2025	Gopalganj	101	Gopalganj	BJP	Subhash Singh	INC	Om Prakash Garg
6 November 2025	Gopalganj	102	Kuchaikote	JD(U)	Amrendra Kumar Pandey	INC	Hari Narain Kushwah
6 November 2025	Gopalganj	103	Bhore (SC)	JD(U)	Sunil Kumar	CPI(ML)L	Dhananjay Kumar
6 November 2025	Gopalganj	104	Hathua	JD(U)	Ramsewak Singh Kushwaha	RJD	Rajesh Singh Kushwaha
6 November 2025	Siwan	105	Siwan	BJP	Mangal Pandey	RJD	Awadh Bihari Choudhary
6 November 2025	Siwan	106	Ziradei	JD(U)	Bhism Pratap Singh	CPI(ML)L	Amarjeet Kushwaha
6 November 2025	Siwan	107	Darauli (SC)	LJP(RV)	Vishnu Deo Paswan	CPI(ML)L	Satyadeo Ram
6 November 2025	Siwan	108	Raghunathpur	JD(U)	Vikash Kumar Singh	RJD	Osama Shahab
6 November 2025	Siwan	109	Daraunda	BJP	Karanjeet Singh	CPI(ML)L	Amarnath Yadav
6 November 2025	Siwan	110	Barharia	JD(U)	Indradev Patel	RJD	Arun Kumar Gupta
6 November 2025	Siwan	111	Goriakothi	BJP	Devesh Kant Singh	RJD	Anwarul Haque
6 November 2025	Siwan	112	Maharajganj	JD(U)	Hemnarayan Sah	RJD	Vishal Jaiswal
6 November 2025	Saran	113	Ekma	JD(U)	Manoranjan singh Dhumal	RJD	Srikant Yadav
6 November 2025	Saran	114	Manjhi	JD(U)	Randhir Kumar Singh	CPI(M)	Satyendra Yadav
6 November 2025	Saran	115	Baniapur	BJP	Kedar Nath Singh	RJD	Chandani Devi
6 November 2025	Saran	116	Taraiya	BJP	Janak Singh	RJD	Shailendra Pratap
6 November 2025	Saran	117	Marhaura	Ind	Ankit Kumar (Note: NDA extended its support to Independent candidate Ankit Kumar from Marhaura constituency after nomination of LJP(RV) candidate Seema Singh was rejected.)	RJD	Jitendra Kumar Rai
6 November 2025	Saran	118	Chapra	BJP	Chhoti Kumari	RJD	Khesari Lal Yadav
6 November 2025	Saran	119	Garkha (SC)	LJP(RV)	Simant Mrinal	RJD	Surendra Ram
6 November 2025	Saran	120	Amnour	BJP	Krishna Kumar Mantoo	RJD	Sunil Kumar
6 November 2025	Saran	121	Parsa	JD(U)	Chhote Lal Ray	RJD	Karishma Rai
6 November 2025	Saran	122	Sonpur	BJP	Vinay Kumar Singh	RJD	Ramanuj Prasad Yadav
6 November 2025	Vaishali	123	Hajipur	BJP	Awadhesh Singh	RJD	Deo Kumar Chaurasia
6 November 2025	Vaishali	124	Lalganj	BJP	Sanjay Kumar Singh	RJD	Shivani Shukla
6 November 2025	Vaishali	125	Vaishali	JD(U)	Siddharth Patel	INC	Sanjeev Singh
6 November 2025	Vaishali	125	Vaishali	JD(U)	Siddharth Patel	RJD	Ajay Kumar Kushwaha
6 November 2025	Vaishali	126	Mahua	LJP(RV)	Sanjay Kumar Singh	RJD	Mukesh Kumar Raushan
6 November 2025	Vaishali	127	Raja Pakar (SC)	JD(U)	Mahendra Ram	INC	Pratima Das
6 November 2025	Vaishali	127	Raja Pakar (SC)	JD(U)	Mahendra Ram	CPI	Mohit Paswan
6 November 2025	Vaishali	128	Raghopur	BJP	Satish Kumar Yadav	RJD	Tejashwi Yadav
6 November 2025	Vaishali	129	Mahnar	JD(U)	Umesh Singh Kushwaha	RJD	Ravindra Kumar Singh
6 November 2025	Vaishali	130	Patepur (SC)	BJP	Lakhendra Raushan	RJD	Prema Chaudhary
6 November 2025	Samastipur	131	Kalyanpur (SC)	JD(U)	Maheshwar Hazari	CPI(ML)L	Ranjeet Ram
6 November 2025	Samastipur	132	Warisnagar	JD(U)	Manjarik Mrinal	CPI(ML)L	Phoolbabu Singh
6 November 2025	Samastipur	133	Samastipur	JD(U)	Ashwamedh Devi	RJD	Akhtarul Islam Shahin
6 November 2025	Samastipur	134	Ujiarpur	RLM	Prashant Kumar Pankaj	RJD	Alok Kumar Mehta
6 November 2025	Samastipur	135	Morwa	JD(U)	Vidya Sagar Singh Nishad	RJD	Ranvijay Sahu
6 November 2025	Samastipur	136	Sarairanjan	JD(U)	Vijay Kumar Chaudhary	RJD	Arbind Kumar Sahani
6 November 2025	Samastipur	137	Mohiuddinnagar	BJP	Rajesh Singh	RJD	Ejya Yadav
6 November 2025	Samastipur	138	Bibhutipur	JD(U)	Raveena Kushwaha	CPI(M)	Ajay Kumar
6 November 2025	Samastipur	139	Rosera (SC)	BJP	Birendra Paswan	INC	Braj Kishore Ravi
6 November 2025	Samastipur	140	Hasanpur	JD(U)	Raj Kumar Ray	RJD	Mala Pushpam
6 November 2025	Begusarai	141	Cheria-Bariarpur	JD(U)	Abhishek Kumar	RJD	Sushil Kumar
6 November 2025	Begusarai	142	Bachhwara	BJP	Surendra Mehata	INC	Shiv Prakash Garib Das
6 November 2025	Begusarai	142	Bachhwara	BJP	Surendra Mehata	CPI	Abdesh Kumar Rai
6 November 2025	Begusarai	143	Teghra	BJP	Rajnish Kumar Singh	CPI	Ram Ratan Singh
6 November 2025	Begusarai	144	Matihani	JD(U)	Rajkumar Singh	RJD	Narendra Kumar Singh
6 November 2025	Begusarai	145	Sahebpur Kamal	LJP(RV)	Surendra Kumar	RJD	Sattanand Sambuddha
6 November 2025	Begusarai	146	Begusarai	BJP	Kundan Kumar	INC	Amita Bhushan
6 November 2025	Begusarai	147	Bakhri (SC)	LJP(RV)	Sanjay Paswan	CPI	Suryakant Paswan
6 November 2025	Khagaria	148	Alauli (SC)	JD(U)	Ram Chandra Sada	RJD	Ramvriksh Sada
6 November 2025	Khagaria	149	Khagaria	JD(U)	Bablu Mandal	INC	Chandan Yadav
6 November 2025	Khagaria	150	Beldaur	JD(U)	Panna Lal Singh Patel	INC	Mithilesh Kumar Nishad
6 November 2025	Khagaria	150	Beldaur	JD(U)	Panna Lal Singh Patel	IIP	Tanisha Bharti
6 November 2025	Khagaria	151	Parbatta	LJP(RV)	Aditya Kumar Shorya	RJD	Sanjeev Kumar
11 November 2025	Bhagalpur	152	Bihpur	BJP	Kumar Shailendra	VIP	Aprana Kumari Mandal
11 November 2025	Bhagalpur	153	Gopalpur	JD(U)	Shailesh Kumar Mandal	VIP	Prem Sagar
11 November 2025	Bhagalpur	154	Pirpainti (SC)	BJP	Murari Paswan	RJD	Ram Vilas Paswan
11 November 2025	Bhagalpur	155	Kahalgaon	JD(U)	Shubhanand Mukesh	RJD	Rajnish Bharti
11 November 2025	Bhagalpur	155	Kahalgaon	JD(U)	Shubhanand Mukesh	INC	Praveen Singh Kushwaha
11 November 2025	Bhagalpur	156	Bhagalpur	BJP	Rohit Pandey	INC	Ajit Sharma
11 November 2025	Bhagalpur	157	Sultanganj	JD(U)	Lalit Narayan Mandal	INC	Lalan Kumar
11 November 2025	Bhagalpur	157	Sultanganj	JD(U)	Lalit Narayan Mandal	RJD	Chandan Sinha
11 November 2025	Bhagalpur	158	Nathnagar	LJP(RV)	Mithun Yadav	RJD	Sheikh Zeyaul Hassan
11 November 2025	Banka	159	Amarpur	JD(U)	Jayant Raj Kushwaha	INC	Jitendra Singh
11 November 2025	Banka	160	Dhoraiya (SC)	JD(U)	Manish Kumar	RJD	Tribhuvan Das
11 November 2025	Banka	161	Banka	BJP	Ramnarayan Mandal	CPI	Sanjay Kumar
11 November 2025	Banka	162	Katoria (ST)	BJP	Puran Lal Tudu	RJD	Sweety Sima Hembram
11 November 2025	Banka	163	Belhar	JD(U)	Manoj Yadav	RJD	Chanakya Prakash Ranjan
6 November 2025	Munger	164	Tarapur	BJP	Samrat Choudhary	RJD	Arun Kumar
6 November 2025	Munger	165	Munger	BJP	Kumar Pranay	RJD	Avinash Kumar Vidyarthi
6 November 2025	Munger	166	Jamalpur	JD(U)	Nachiketa Mandal	IIP	Narendra Kumar
6 November 2025	Lakhisarai	167	Suryagarha	JD(U)	Ramanand Mandal	RJD	Premsagar Choudhary
6 November 2025	Lakhisarai	168	Lakhisarai	BJP	Vijay Kumar Sinha	INC	Amresh Kumar Aneesh
6 November 2025	Sheikhpura	169	Sheikhpura	JD(U)	Randhir Kumar Soni	RJD	Vijay Kumar
6 November 2025	Sheikhpura	170	Barbigha	JD(U)	Kumar Puspanjay	INC	Trishuldhari Singh
6 November 2025	Nalanda	171	Asthawan	JD(U)	Jitendra Kumar	RJD	Ravi Ranjan Kumar
6 November 2025	Nalanda	172	Bihar Sharif	BJP	Sunil Kumar	INC	Omair Khan
6 November 2025	Nalanda	172	Bihar Sharif	BJP	Sunil Kumar	CPI	Shiv Kumar Yadav
6 November 2025	Nalanda	173	Rajgir (SC)	JD(U)	Kaushal Kishore	CPI(ML)L	Biswanath Choudhary
6 November 2025	Nalanda	174	Islampur	JD(U)	Ruhail Ranjan	RJD	Rakesh Kumar Raushan
6 November 2025	Nalanda	175	Hilsa	JD(U)	Krishnamurari Sharan	RJD	Shaki Singh Yadav
6 November 2025	Nalanda	176	Nalanda	JD(U)	Shrawan Kumar	INC	Kaushlendra Kumar
6 November 2025	Nalanda	177	Harnaut	JD(U)	Hari Narayan Singh	INC	Arun Kumar Bind
6 November 2025	Patna	178	Mokama	JD(U)	Anant Kumar Singh	RJD	Veena Devi
6 November 2025	Patna	179	Barh	BJP	Siyaram Singh	RJD	Karnveer Singh Yadav
6 November 2025	Patna	180	Bakhtiarpur	LJP(RV)	Arun Kumar	RJD	Aniruddh Kumar
6 November 2025	Patna	181	Digha	BJP	Sanjiv Chaurasiya	CPI(ML)L	Divya Gautam
6 November 2025	Patna	182	Bankipur	BJP	Nitin Nabin	RJD	Rekha Kumari Gupta
6 November 2025	Patna	183	Kumhrar	BJP	Sanjay Gupta	INC	Indradeep Chandravanshi
6 November 2025	Patna	184	Patna Sahib	BJP	Ratnesh Kushwaha	INC	Shashant Shekar
6 November 2025	Patna	185	Fatuha	LJP(RV)	Roopa Kumari	RJD	Ramanand Yadav
6 November 2025	Patna	186	Danapur	BJP	Ram Kripal Yadav	RJD	Ritlal Yadav
6 November 2025	Patna	187	Maner	LJP(RV)	Jitendra Yadav	RJD	Bhai Virendra
6 November 2025	Patna	188	Phulwari (SC)	JD(U)	Shyam Rajak	CPI(ML)L	Gopal Ravidas
6 November 2025	Patna	189	Masaurhi (SC)	JD(U)	Arun Manjhi	RJD	Rekha Devi
6 November 2025	Patna	190	Paliganj	LJP(RV)	Sunil Kumar	CPI(ML)L	Sandeep Saurav
6 November 2025	Patna	191	Bikram	BJP	Siddharth Saurav	INC	Anil Kumar
6 November 2025	Bhojpur	192	Sandesh	JD(U)	Radha Charan Sah	RJD	Dipu Singh
6 November 2025	Bhojpur	193	Barhara	BJP	Raghvendra Pratap Singh	RJD	Ashok Kumar Singh
6 November 2025	Bhojpur	194	Arrah	BJP	Sanjay Singh Tiger	CPI(ML)L	Quyamuddin Ansar
6 November 2025	Bhojpur	195	Agiaon (SC)	BJP	Mahesh Paswan	CPI(ML)L	Shiv Prakash Ranjan
6 November 2025	Bhojpur	196	Tarari	BJP	Vishal Prashant	CPI(ML)L	Madan Chandravanshi
6 November 2025	Bhojpur	197	Jagdishpur	JD(U)	Bhagwan Kushwaha	RJD	Kishore Kunal
6 November 2025	Bhojpur	198	Shahpur	BJP	Rakesh Ojha	RJD	Rahul Tiwari
6 November 2025	Buxar	199	Brahampur	LJP(RV)	Hulas Pandey	RJD	Shambhu Nath Yadav
6 November 2025	Buxar	200	Buxar	BJP	Anand Mishra	INC	Sanjay Kumar Tiwari
6 November 2025	Buxar	201	Dumraon	JD(U)	Rahul Singh	CPI(ML)L	Ajit Kushwaha
6 November 2025	Buxar	202	Rajpur (SC)	JD(U)	Santosh Kumar Nirala	INC	Vishwanath Ram
11 November 2025	Kaimur	203	Ramgarh	BJP	Ashok Kumar Singh	RJD	Ajit Singh
11 November 2025	Kaimur	204	Mohania (SC)	BJP	Sangita Kumari	Ind	Ravi Paswan (Note: Mahagathbandhan extended its support to Independent candidate Ravi Paswan from Mohania constituency after nomination of RJD candidate Shweta Suman was rejected.)
11 November 2025	Kaimur	205	Bhabua	BJP	Bharat Bind	RJD	Birender Kushwaha
11 November 2025	Kaimur	206	Chainpur	JD(U)	Mohd Zama Khan	VIP	Bal Govind Bind
11 November 2025	Kaimur	206	Chainpur	JD(U)	Mohd Zama Khan	RJD	Brij Kishore Bind
11 November 2025	Rohtas	207	Chenari (SC)	LJP(RV)	Murari Prasad Gautam	INC	Mangal Ram
11 November 2025	Rohtas	208	Sasaram	RLM	Snehlata Kushwaha	RJD	Satender Sah
11 November 2025	Rohtas	209	Kargahar	JD(U)	Bashisth Singh	INC	Santosh Kumar Mishra
11 November 2025	Rohtas	209	Kargahar	JD(U)	Bashisth Singh	CPI	Mahendra Prasad Gupta
11 November 2025	Rohtas	210	Dinara	RLM	Alok Kumar Singh	RJD	Rajesh Yadav
11 November 2025	Rohtas	211	Nokha	JD(U)	Nagendra Chandravanshi	RJD	Anita Devi
11 November 2025	Rohtas	212	Dehri	LJP(RV)	Rajeev Ranjan Singh	RJD	Guddu Chandravanshi
11 November 2025	Rohtas	213	Karakat	JD(U)	Mahabali Singh	CPI(ML)L	Arun Singh Kushwaha
11 November 2025	Arwal	214	Arwal	BJP	Manoj Kumar	CPI(ML)L	Maha Nand Singh
11 November 2025	Arwal	215	Kurtha	JD(U)	Pappu Verma	RJD	Suday Yadav
11 November 2025	Jehanabad	216	Jehanabad	JD(U)	Chandeshwar Prasad	RJD	Rahul Sharma
11 November 2025	Jehanabad	217	Ghosi	JD(U)	Rituraj Kumar	CPI(ML)L	Ram Bali Singh Yadav
11 November 2025	Jehanabad	218	Makhdumpur (SC)	LJP(RV)	Rani Kumari	RJD	Subedar Das
11 November 2025	Aurangabad	219	Goh	BJP	Ranvijay Kumar	RJD	Amrender Kushwaha
11 November 2025	Aurangabad	220	Obra	LJP(RV)	Prakash Chandra	RJD	Rishi Kumar
11 November 2025	Aurangabad	221	Nabinagar	JD(U)	Chetan Anand	RJD	Amod Chandravanshi
11 November 2025	Aurangabad	222	Kutumba (SC)	HAM(S)	Lalan Ram	INC	Rajesh Kumar
11 November 2025	Aurangabad	223	Aurangabad	BJP	Trivikram Singh	INC	Anand Shankar Singh
11 November 2025	Aurangabad	224	Rafiganj	JD(U)	Pramod Kumar Singh	RJD	Dr. Ghulam Shahid
11 November 2025	Gaya	225	Gurua	BJP	Upendra Prasad	RJD	Vinay Kumar
11 November 2025	Gaya	226	Sherghati	LJP(RV)	Uday Kumar Singh	RJD	Pramod Verma
11 November 2025	Gaya	227	Imamganj (SC)	HAM(S)	Deepa Manjhi	RJD	Ritu Priya Chaudhary
11 November 2025	Gaya	228	Barachatti (SC)	HAM(S)	Jyoti Devi	RJD	Tanushree Manjhi
11 November 2025	Gaya	229	Bodh Gaya (SC)	LJP(RV)	Shyam Deo Paswan	RJD	Kumar Sarvjit Paswan
11 November 2025	Gaya	230	Gaya Town	BJP	Prem Kumar	INC	Mohan Shrivasta
11 November 2025	Gaya	231	Tikari	HAM(S)	Anil Kumar	RJD	Ajay Dangi
11 November 2025	Gaya	232	Belaganj	JD(U)	Manorama Devi	RJD	Vishwanath Kumar Singh
11 November 2025	Gaya	233	Atri	HAM(S)	Romit Kumar	RJD	Vaijayanti Devi
11 November 2025	Gaya	234	Wazirganj	BJP	Birendra Singh	INC	Awadhesh Singh
11 November 2025	Nawada	235	Rajauli (SC)	LJP(RV)	Vimala Rajvanshi	RJD	Pinki Chaudhary
11 November 2025	Nawada	236	Hisua	BJP	Anil Singh	INC	Nitu Kumari
11 November 2025	Nawada	237	Nawada	JD(U)	Vibha Devi Yadav	RJD	Kaushal Yadav
11 November 2025	Nawada	238	Gobindpur	LJP(RV)	Binita Mahato	RJD	Purnima Devi
11 November 2025	Nawada	239	Warisaliganj	BJP	Aruna Devi	RJD	Anita Mahto
11 November 2025	Jamui	240	Sikandra (SC)	HAM(S)	Prafull Manjhi	INC	Vinod Kumar Chaudhary
11 November 2025	Jamui	240	Sikandra (SC)	HAM(S)	Prafull Manjhi	RJD	Uday Narain Choudhary
11 November 2025	Jamui	241	Jamui	BJP	Shreyasi Singh	RJD	Shamshad Alam
11 November 2025	Jamui	242	Jhajha	JD(U)	Damodar Rawat	RJD	Jai Prakash Yadav
11 November 2025	Jamui	243	Chakai	JD(U)	Sumit Kumar Singh	RJD	Savitri Devi

== Campaign ==
The campaign centered on a mix of local and socio-economic issues. Unemployment and migration were prominent themes: parties noted that many Bihar youth migrate out of state for work, and competing manifestos promised large-scale job creation. Caste politics also remained a key factor. All major parties pledged to support a new caste census and "social justice" measures, reflecting widespread calls to address the state's caste-based inequalities. Corruption and governance were attacked by the opposition; for example, RJD leader Tejashwi Yadav accused the Nitish Kumar government of "institutionalising corruption" and misusing government schemes (like a women's outreach programme) for electioneering. The ruling alliance countered by criticizing the RJD's past ("jungle raj") and highlighting its own welfare record. A major flashpoint was the voter roll revision (Special Intensive Revision, SIR) carried out by the Election Commission. Opposition parties claimed the intensive revision was a partisan tool, alleging mass deletions of voters and promising protests or even an election boycott.

=== Party campaign strategies ===
- NDA (BJP, JD(U), LJP(R), RLM, HAM(S)): The ruling coalition ran on a platform of development and social welfare. It emphasized caste-based outreach and welfare delivery, and frequently invoked Prime Minister Modi's leadership. The BJP also attacked the RJD over law and order and historic scams, while JD(U) emphasized Nitish Kumar's governance. Seat-sharing talks between BJP and JD(U) indicated a near-equal division.
- RJD (leading Mahagathbandhan): The RJD centered its campaign on employment, youth issues, and anti-incumbency. Tejashwi Yadav pledged massive job creation and ran a digital-heavy campaign, including AI-generated videos and memes. The RJD organized backward caste meetings and positioned itself as the party of Dalits, OBCs, and the poor.
- Jan Suraaj Party: Led by Prashant Kishor, Jan Suraaj positioned itself as an alternative to both NDA and the INDIA bloc. Kishor organized the Bihar Badlav Yatra, pledged to contest all 243 seats, and focused on governance, education, and clean politics. Between October 2022 and October 2024, he undertook padayatra across Bihar, walking over 5,000 km and visiting more than 5,500 villages to engage with local communities directly. At the party's launch, Kishor announced provisions such as candidate selection through US-style primaries, the right to recall legislators who fail to perform, and a pledge that 90% of candidates would be first-time contestants.
- Congress: As a partner in the Mahagathbandhan, the Congress highlighted youth migration and unemployment, notably through leader Kanhaiya Kumar's padyatra. Rahul Gandhi planned a multi-day campaign tour of Bihar in August 2025, criticizing voter list issues and advocating electoral reforms.

== Issues ==
=== Unemployment ===
Bihar faces a severe unemployment crisis, particularly among youth and educated graduates. Many young Biharis are forced to migrate to other states for work due to lack of opportunities. Both the ruling NDA and opposition Mahagathbandhan had made job creation and youth empowerment key promises, with pledges such as government jobs for every household, skill centers, and massive investment packages.

=== Allegations of electoral roll manipulation ===
Allegations of voter roll manipulation were made by the opposition Mahagathbandhan. The Election Commission carried out a Special Intensive Revision (SIR), resulting in mass deletions of over six million names of people, who had died, migrated out of the state or were duplicates, from the electoral rolls. Congress leader Rahul Gandhi had accused the government and Election Commission of allegedly stealing votes. While the NDA defended the SIR as necessary to ensure accurate electoral rolls by removing dead voter's names, ineligible voters and voters who have moved out of the state.

=== Migration ===
Driven by lack of employment, lakhs of Bihari youth migrate to other states each year. Both camps have made migration a major talking point, linking it directly to economic stagnation and poor governance.

=== Corruption ===
Corruption continues to be a significant issue in Bihar’s governance. It hampers development and the effective implementation of welfare programs. Allegations include bribery, favoritism, and financial mismanagement in various sectors such as public distribution, infrastructure projects, and government recruitment. The prevalence of corruption undermines public confidence in political leadership.

=== Development deficit ===
Despite various government efforts, Bihar remains underdeveloped in critical areas like infrastructure, healthcare, and education. Many rural areas lack access to adequate roads, electricity, hospitals, and schools. These shortcomings are persistent voter concerns influencing election outcomes.

=== Law and order ===
Law and order problems, including caste-based violence, crime rates, and political intimidation, affect public safety. Improving policing and justice systems was a key election promise by competing parties.

== Controversies ==
=== Special Intensive Revision of electoral rolls ===
On 24 June 2025, the Election Commission (EC) notified that it will conduct a Special Intensive Revision of electoral rolls in Bihar before the elections. The exercise requires all the voters from the state to fill forms to be included in the voter list. People whose names were not in the 2003 voter lists need to provide additional documents. The notification also mentioned that the documents needed to be submitted within a month (with 25 July being the deadline).

Further, the voters need to provide one of the eleven documents mandated by the EC, with the common documents such as the Aadhaar card, voter ID card and ration cards, not included as valid documents. A significant number of people in Bihar do not have any of the 11 documents. Furthermore, a significant population of the state migrate in other parts of India for work or study and it is estimated that at least 75 lakh (7.5 million) people from Bihar migrate to other parts of India. Critics have argued it would be difficult for such voters to be a part of this exercise. Such factors have led to fears of mass exclusion of voters. Opposition parties – such as the INDIA alliance – alleged that such an exercise will favor the ruling NDA alliance. The Election Commission denied these allegations and claimed that the exercise is lawful and constitutional.

The SIR was challenged in the Supreme Court. On 10 July, the court advised the Election Commission to consider the Aadhaar card, voter ID card and ration cards as valid documents for the exercise. On 21 July, the Election Commission responded by saying that it will not accept the Aadhaar card, voter ID card and ration cards as valid documents, as suggested by the Supreme Court.

In August, Tejashwi Yadav, leader of the opposition of Bihar, alleged his name was removed from the voter list after the SIR exercise, however his name did appear in the list after checking. The Election commission dismissed the allegations as factually incorrect and declared the EPIC number shown by him to the media was fake. The poll body asked him to submit the fake voter ID card to the ECI office by 16 August 2025.

In August 2025, Rahul Gandhi made allegations against BJP about election commission. The ECI dismissed the allegations as misleading, and asked him to submit the allegations under oath or apologise to the nation.

=== AI doctored videos ===
Ahead of the elections, two doctored videos falsely showing Indian Army officials criticising tri-military "Trishul 2025" exercises as a political stunt were circulated widely on X. Fact-checks by iVerify and Indian media established that the viral videos were fabricated using dubbed or synthetic audio to spread misinformation.

== Surveys and polls ==
=== Opinion polls ===
Seat projections
Polling agency	Date published	Sample size	Margin of error				Lead
Polling agency	Date published	Sample size	Margin of error	NDA	MGB	Others	Lead
Times Now–JVC	27 August 2025	63,419	—	136	75	6	61
Lok Poll	26 September 2025	—	—	105–114	118–126	2–5	4–21
Times Now–JVC	September 2025	73,283	—	131–150	81–103	9–12	28–69
IANS–Matrize	6 October 2025	46,862	±3%	150–160	70–85	10–18	65–90
Times Now–JVC	1 November 2025	—	—	120–140	93–112	8–11	8–47

Vote share projections
Polling agency	Date published	Sample size	Margin of error				Lead
Polling agency	Date published	Sample size	Margin of error	NDA	MGB	Others	Lead
Vote Vibe	14 September 2025	5,635	—	36.2%	35.8%	21.5%	0.4%
Times Now–JVC	September 2025	73,283	—	41–45%	37–40%	—	1–8%
IANS–Matrize	6 October 2025	46,862	±3%	49%	36%	15%	13%
Vote Vibe	8 October 2025	1,000+	—	41.3%	39.7%	16.3%	1.6%
Times Now–JVC	1 November 2025	—	—	41–43%	39–41%	16–18%	0–4%

=== Exit polls ===
The exit polls were declared on 11 November 2025.

Polling agency					Lead
Polling agency	NDA	MGB	JSP	Others	Lead
2020 election results	125	110	-	8	NDA
Axis My India	121–141	98–118	0–2	0–2	NDA
IANS-Matrize	147–167	70–90	0–2	2–8	NDA
People's Insight	133–148	87–102	0–2	3–6	NDA
Chanakya Strategies	130–138	100–108	0	3–5	NDA
Peoples Pulse	133–159	75–101	0–5	2–8	NDA
JVC Poll	135–150	88–103	0–1	3–6	NDA
Dainik Bhaskar	145–160	73–91	0	5–10	NDA
P-Marq	142–162	80–98	1–4	0–3	NDA
TIF Research	145–163	76–95	0	3–6	NDA
DV Research	137–152	83–98	2–4	1–8	NDA
Aggregate poll	147	90	1	5	NDA
2025 election results	202	35	0	6	NDA

Polling agency					Lead
Polling agency	NDA	MGB	JSP	Others	Lead
2020 election results	37.26%	37.23%	-	25.51%	0.03
Axis My India	43%	41%	4%	12%	2
IANS-Matrize	48%	37%	5%	10%	11
2025 election results	46.56%	37.94%	3.44%	12.06%	8.62

== Voter turnout ==
=== Voting by phase ===
Phase	Date	Seats	Turnout (%)
I	6 November 2025	121	65.08
II	11 November 2025	122	69.20
Total		243	67.25

== Results ==
=== Results by alliance or party ===
Source
Alliance/ Party		Popular vote			Seats			Won of Contested
Alliance/ Party		Votes	%	±pp	Contested	Won	+/−	%
NDA	BJP	10,081,143	20.08	▲0.62	101	89	▲15	88.1
NDA	JD(U)	9,667,118	19.25	▲3.86	101	85	▲42	84.2
NDA	LJP(RV)	2,497,358	4.97	New entry	28	19	▲19	67.9
NDA	HAM(S)	587,056	1.17	▲0.28	6	5	▲1	83.3
NDA	RLM	533,313	1.06	New entry	6	4	▲4	66.7
NDA	Ind	17,310	0.03	New entry	1	0	Steady	
NDA	Total	23,383,298	46.56	▲9.30	243	202	▲81	83.1
MGB	RJD	11,546,055	23.00	▼0.11	143	25	▼50	17.5
MGB	INC	4,374,579	8.71	▼0.77	61	6	▼13	9.8
MGB	CPI(ML)L	1,425,592	2.84	▼0.31	20	2	▼10	10.0
MGB	VIP	689,484	1.37	▼0.15	12	0	▼4	0.0
MGB	CPI	372,458	0.74	▼0.09	9	0	▼2	0.0
MGB	CPI(M)	302,974	0.61	▼0.04	4	1	▼1	25.0
MGB	IIP	184,679	0.37	New entry	3	1	▲1	33.3
MGB	JJD	40,684	0.08	New entry	1	0	Steady	
MGB	Ind	106,782	0.21	New entry	2	0		
MGB	Total	18,589,587	37.93		243	35	▼80	14.4
GDA	AIMIM	930,504	1.85	▲0.19	28	5	Steady	20.0
GDA	ASP(KR)	96,796	0.21	New entry	18	0	Steady	0.0
GDA	RLJP	85,724	0.17	New entry	36	0	Steady	0.0
GDA	Total	111,324	2.09		64	5		6.3
JSP		1,677,583	3.34	New entry	238	0	Steady	0.0
BSP		813,553	1.62	▲0.13	181	1	Steady	0.6
Others		3,816,754	6.72					0.0
NOTA		910,730	1.81	▲0.13			Steady	
Total		50,207,733	100%	—	2,616	243	—	

=== Results by district ===
District	Seats			
District	Seats	NDA	MGB	OTH
West Champaran	9	7	2	—N/a
East Champaran	12	11	1	—N/a
Sheohar	1	1	—N/a	—N/a
Sitamarhi	8	8	—N/a	—N/a
Madhubani	10	9	1	—N/a
Supaul	5	5	—N/a	—N/a
Araria	6	2	3	1
Kishanganj	4	1	1	2
Purnia	7	5	—N/a	2
Katihar	7	6	1	—N/a
Madhepura	4	3	1	—N/a
Saharsa	4	2	2	—N/a
Darbhanga	10	10	—N/a	—N/a
Muzaffarpur	11	10	1	—N/a
Gopalganj	6	6	—N/a	—N/a
Siwan	8	7	1	—N/a
Saran	10	7	3	—N/a
Vaishali	8	7	1	—N/a
Samastipur	10	7	3	—N/a
Begusarai	7	5	2	—N/a
Khagaria	4	4	—N/a	—N/a
Bhagalpur	7	7	—N/a	—N/a
Banka	5	5	—N/a	—N/a
Munger	3	3	—N/a	—N/a
Lakhisarai	2	2	—N/a	—N/a
Sheikhpura	2	2	—N/a	—N/a
Nalanda	7	7	—N/a	—N/a
Patna	14	11	3	—N/a
Bhojpur	7	7	—N/a	—N/a
Buxar	4	3	1	—N/a
Kaimur	4	3	—N/a	1
Rohtas	7	6	1	—N/a
Arwal	2	2	—N/a	—N/a
Jehanabad	3	1	2	—N/a
Aurangabad	6	5	1	—N/a
Gaya	10	8	2	—N/a
Nawada	5	4	1	—N/a
Jamui	4	3	1	—N/a
Total	243	202	35	6

=== Results by constituency ===
Constituency			Winner				Runner-up				Margin	
District	No.	Name	Candidate	Party	Votes	%	Candidate	Party	Votes	%	Votes	%
West Champaran	1	Valmiki Nagar	Surendra Kushwaha	INC	107,730	46.11	Dhirendra Pratap Singh	JD(U)	106,055	45.39	1,675	0.72
West Champaran	2	Ramnagar (SC)	Nand Kishor Ram	BJP	115,214	54.13	Subodh Kumar	RJD	79,534	37.36	35,680	16.77
West Champaran	3	Narkatiaganj	Sanjay Pandey	BJP	100,044	50.86	Deepak Yadav	RJD	73,586	37.41	26,458	13.45
West Champaran	4	Bagaha	Ram Singh	BJP	106,875	47.39	Jayesh Mangalam Singh	INC	100,562	44.59	6,313	2.80
West Champaran	5	Lauriya	Vinay Bihari	BJP	96,510	50.36	Ran Kaushal Pratap Singh	VIP	69,544	36.29	26,966	14.07
West Champaran	6	Nautan	Narayan Prasad	BJP	101,952	49.05	Amit Kumar	INC	79,880	38.43	22,072	10.62
West Champaran	7	Chanpatia	Abhishek Ranjan	INC	87,538	40.07	Umakant Singh	BJP	86,936	39.80	602	0.27
West Champaran	8	Bettiah	Renu Devi	BJP	91,907	46.78	Washi Ahmad	INC	69,534	35.39	22,373	11.39
West Champaran	9	Sikta	Sammridh Varma	JD(U)	97,173	46.11	Firoj Ahmad	IND	50,029	23.74	47,144	22.37
East Champaran	10	Raxaul	Pramod Kumar Sinha	BJP	106,765	49.55	Shyam Bihari Prasad	INC	88,887	41.26	17,878	8.29
East Champaran	11	Sugauli	Rajesh Kumar	LJP(RV)	98,875	49.74	Shyam Kishor Chaudhary	JJD	40,684	20.47	58,191	29.27
East Champaran	12	Narkatiya	Vishal Kumar	JD(U)	104,450	46.70	Shamim Ahmad	RJD	103,007	46.06	1,443	0.64
East Champaran	13	Harsidhi (SC)	Krishnanandan Paswan	BJP	96,864	47.74	Rajendra Kumar	RJD	89,769	44.24	7,095	3.50
East Champaran	14	Govindganj	Raju Tiwari	LJP(RV)	96,034	52.55	Shashi Bhushan	INC	63,351	34.67	32,683	17.88
East Champaran	15	Kesaria	Shalini Mishra	JD(U)	78,192	44.26	Varun Vijay	VIP	61,852	35.01	16,340	9.25
East Champaran	16	Kalyanpur	Sachindra Prasad Singh	BJP	89,057	47.82	Manoj Kumar Yadav	RJD	73,489	39.46	15,568	8.36
East Champaran	17	Pipra	Shyambabu Prasad Yadav	BJP	110,422	45.13	Rajmangal Prasad	CPI(M)	99,677	40.74	10,745	4.39
East Champaran	18	Madhuban	Rana Randhir	BJP	86,002	46.78	Sandhya Rani	RJD	80,510	43.80	5,492	2.98
East Champaran	19	Motihari	Pramod Kumar	BJP	106,080	49.50	Dewa Gupta	RJD	92,517	43.17	13,563	6.33
East Champaran	20	Chiraia	Lal Babu Prasad Gupta	BJP	90,572	45.65	Lakshmi Narayan Prasad	RJD	51,212	25.81	39,360	19.84
East Champaran	21	Dhaka	Faisal Rahman	RJD	112,727	45.72	Pawan Kumar Jaiswal	BJP	112,549	45.65	178	0.07
Sheohar	22	Sheohar	Shweta Gupta	JD(U)	97,269	46.29	Navneet Kumar	RJD	65,871	31.35	31,398	14.94
Sitamarhi	23	Riga	Baidyanath Prasad	BJP	117,393	54.11	Amit Kumar	INC	84,268	38.84	33,125	15.27
Sitamarhi	24	Bathnaha (SC)	Anil Kumar	BJP	123,698	57.47	Naveen Kumar	INC	71,929	33.42	51,769	24.05
Sitamarhi	25	Parihar	Gayatri Devi	BJP	82,644	39.36	Ritu Jaiswal	IND	65,455	31.17	17,189	8.19
Sitamarhi	26	Sursand	Nagendra Raut	JD(U)	104,157	50.04	Syed Abu Dojana	RJD	80,490	38.67	23,667	11.37
Sitamarhi	27	Bajpatti	Rameshwar Mahto	RLM	99,144	45.02	Mukesh Yadav	RJD	95,749	43.47	3,395	1.55
Sitamarhi	28	Sitamarhi	Sunil Kumar Pintu	BJP	104,226	48.11	Sunil Kushwaha	RJD	98,664	45.54	5,562	2.57
Sitamarhi	29	Runnisaidpur	Pankaj Mishra	JD(U)	93,672	48.50	Chandan Kumar	RJD	73,935	38.28	19,737	10.22
Sitamarhi	30	Belsand	Amit Kumar	LJP(RV)	82,076	44.83	Sanjay Gupta	RJD	59,391	32.44	22,685	12.39
Madhubani	31	Harlakhi	Sudhanshu Shekhar	JD(U)	85,486	46.60	Rakesh Pandey	CPI	49,250	26.85	36,236	19.75
Madhubani	32	Benipatti	Vinod Narayan Jha	BJP	87,153	49.74	Nalini Ranjan Jha	INC	63,221	36.08	23,932	13.66
Madhubani	33	Khajauli	Arun Shankar Prasad	BJP	101,151	49.36	Braj Kishore Yadav	RJD	88,025	42.95	13,126	6.41
Madhubani	34	Babubarhi	Mina Kumari	JD(U)	98,221	47.61	Arun Kumar Singh	RJD	80,653	39.09	17,568	8.52
Madhubani	35	Bisfi	Asif Ahmad	RJD	100,771	48.62	Haribhushan Thakur	BJP	92,664	44.71	8,107	3.91
Madhubani	36	Madhubani	Madhav Anand	RLM	97,956	46.38	Samir Kumar Mahaseth	RJD	77,404	36.65	20,552	9.73
Madhubani	37	Rajnagar (SC)	Sujit Paswan	BJP	108,362	56.79	Bishnu Deo Mochi	RJD	66,177	34.68	42,185	22.11
Madhubani	38	Jhanjharpur	Nitish Mishra	BJP	107,958	55.89	Ram Narayan Yadav	CPI	53,109	27.50	54,849	28.39
Madhubani	39	Phulparas	Sheela Kumari	JD(U)	93,677	45.65	Subodh Mandal	INC	79,578	38.78	14,099	6.87
Madhubani	40	Laukaha	Satish Kumar Sah	JD(U)	111,761	48.43	Bharat Bhushan Mandal	RJD	86,250	37.37	25,511	11.06
Supaul	41	Nirmali	Aniruddha Prasad Yadav	JD(U)	118,904	53.28	Baidyanath Mehta	RJD	81,594	36.56	37,310	16.72
Supaul	42	Pipra	Rambilash Kamat	JD(U)	107,041	48.00	Anil Kumar	CPI(ML)L	69,265	31.06	37,776	16.94
Supaul	43	Supaul	Bijendra Prasad Yadav	JD(U)	109,085	52.16	Minnatullah Rahmani	INC	78,282	37.43	30,803	14.73
Supaul	44	Triveniganj (SC)	Sonam Rani Sardar	JD(U)	105,262	47.48	Santosh Kumar	RJD	99,579	44.92	5,683	2.56
Supaul	45	Chhatapur	Neeraj Singh Bablu	BJP	122,491	49.18	Vipin Kumar Nonia	RJD	106,313	42.69	16,178	6.49
Araria	46	Narpatganj	Devanti Yadav	BJP	120,366	49.89	Manish Yadav	RJD	94,992	39.40	25,353	10.49
Araria	47	Raniganj (SC)	Avinash Mangalam	RJD	111,590	48.44	Achmit Rishidev	JD(U)	103,060	44.74	8,530	3.70
Araria	48	Forbesganj	Manoj Bishwas	INC	120,114	47.77	Vidya Sagar Keshri	BJP	119,893	47.68	221	0.09
Araria	49	Araria	Avidur Rahman	INC	91,529	37.81	Shagufta Azim	JD(U)	78,788	32.55	12,741	5.26
Araria	50	Jokihat	Murshid Alam	AIMIM	83,737	38.52	Manzar Alam	JD(U)	54,934	25.27	28,803	13.25
Araria	51	Sikti	Vijay Mandal	BJP	111,342	50.56	Hari Narayan Pramanik	VIP	92,020	41.78	19,322	8.78
Kishanganj	52	Bahadurganj	Tauseef Alam	AIMIM	87,315	40.21	Masawar Alam	INC	58,589	26.98	28,726	13.23
Kishanganj	53	Thakurganj	Gopal Agarwal	JD(U)	85,243	34.71	Ghulam Hasnain	AIMIM	76,421	31.12	8,822	3.59
Kishanganj	54	Kishanganj	Qamrul Hoda	INC	89,669	39.49	Sweety Singh	BJP	76,875	33.86	12,794	5.63
Kishanganj	55	Kochadhaman	Sarwar Alam	AIMIM	81,860	42.34	Mujahid Alam	RJD	58,839	30.44	23,021	11.90
Purnia	56	Amour	Akhtarul Iman	AIMIM	100,836	43.49	Saba Zafar	JD(U)	61,908	26.70	38,928	16.79
Purnia	57	Baisi	Ghulam Sarwar	AIMIM	92,766	41.37	Vinod Yadav	BJP	65,515	29.22	27,251	12.15
Purnia	58	Kasba	Nitesh Kumar Singh	LJP(RV)	86,877	36.81	Irfan Alam	INC	74,002	31.36	12,875	5.45
Purnia	59	Banmankhi (SC)	Krishna Kumar Rishi	BJP	122,494	57.26	Deo Narayan Rajak	INC	77,198	36.09	45,296	21.17
Purnia	60	Rupauli	Kaladhar Mandal	JD(U)	124,826	55.45	Bima Bharti	RJD	51,254	22.77	73,572	32.68
Purnia	61	Dhamdaha	Leshi Singh	JD(U)	138,750	57.32	Santosh Kumar Kushwaha	RJD	83,591	34.53	55,159	22.79
Purnia	62	Purnia	Vijay Khemka	BJP	127,614	54.79	Jitendra Kumar	INC	94,392	40.53	33,222	14.26
Katihar	63	Katihar	Tarkishore Prasad	BJP	100,255	50.52	Saurav Kumar Agarwal	VIP	78,101	39.36	22,154	11.16
Katihar	64	Kadwa	Dulal Chandra Goswami	JD(U)	99,274	46.57	Shakeel Ahmad Khan	INC	80,906	37.96	18,368	8.61
Katihar	65	Balrampur	Sangita Devi	LJP(RV)	80,459	29.04	Mohammad Adil Hasan	AIMIM	80,070	28.90	389	0.14
Katihar	66	Pranpur	Nisha Singh	BJP	108,565	42.65	Ishrat Parween	RJD	100,813	39.61	7,752	3.04
Katihar	67	Manihari (ST)	Manohar Prasad Singh	INC	114,754	48.16	Shambhu Prasad	JD(U)	99,586	41.80	15,168	6.36
Katihar	68	Barari	Vijay Singh Nishad	JD(U)	107,842	47.18	Tauquir Alam	INC	96,858	42.37	10,984	4.81
Katihar	69	Korha (SC)	Kavita Devi	BJP	123,495	51.82	Punam Paswan	INC	101,238	42.48	22,257	9.34
Madhepura	70	Alamnagar	Narendra Narayan Yadav	JD(U)	138,401	53.98	Nabin Kumar	VIP	82,936	32.35	55,465	21.63
Madhepura	71	Bihariganj	Niranjan Mehta	JD(U)	116,622	52.12	Renu Kushawaha	RJD	85,000	37.99	31,622	14.13
Madhepura	72	Singheshwar (SC)	Ramesh Rishidev	JD(U)	106,416	46.43	Chandrahas Chaupal	RJD	103,434	45.13	2,982	1.30
Madhepura	73	Madhepura	Chandrashekhar Yadav	RJD	108,464	45.27	Kavita Kumari Saha	JD(U)	100,655	42.01	7,809	3.26
Saharsa	74	Sonbarsha (SC)	Ratnesh Sada	JD(U)	97,833	47.39	Sarita Devi	INC	84,379	40.87	13,454	6.52
Saharsa	75	Saharsa	Indrajeet Prasad Gupta	IIP	115,036	44.28	Alok Ranjan Jha	BJP	112,998	43.50	2,038	0.78
Saharsa	76	Simri Bakhtiarpur	Sanjay Kumar Singh	LJP(RV)	109,699	46.94	Yusuf Salahuddin	RJD	101,769	43.54	7,930	3.40
Saharsa	77	Mahishi	Gautam Krishna	RJD	93,752	46.19	Gunjeshwar Sah	JD(U)	90,012	44.35	3,740	1.84
Darbhanga	78	Kusheshwar Asthan (SC)	Atirek Kumar	JD(U)	85,685	52.25	Ganesh Bharti	IND	49,244	30.03	36,441	22.22
Darbhanga	79	Gaura Bauram	Sujit Singh	BJP	77,682	46.18	Afzal Ali Khan	RJD	72,013	42.81	5,669	3.37
Darbhanga	80	Benipur	Binay Kumar Choudhary	JD(U)	84,207	44.70	Mithilesh Kumar Chaudhary	INC	70,604	37.48	13,603	7.22
Darbhanga	81	Alinagar	Maithili Thakur	BJP	84,915	49.05	Binod Mishra	RJD	73,185	42.27	11,730	6.78
Darbhanga	82	Darbhanga Rural	Rajesh Kumar Mandal	JD(U)	80,624	44.05	Lalit Kumar Yadav	RJD	62,232	34.00	18,392	10.05
Darbhanga	83	Darbhanga	Sanjay Saraogi	BJP	97,453	49.66	Umesh Sahani	VIP	72,860	37.13	24,593	12.53
Darbhanga	84	Hayaghat	Ram Chandra Prasad	BJP	77,222	45.68	Shyam Bharti	CPI(M)	65,383	38.68	11,839	7.00
Darbhanga	85	Bahadurpur	Madan Sahni	JD(U)	96,300	45.24	Bhola Yadav	RJD	84,289	39.60	12,001	5.64
Darbhanga	86	Keoti	Murari Mohan Jha	BJP	89,123	46.28	Faraz Fatmi	RJD	81,818	42.48	7,305	3.80
Darbhanga	87	Jale	Jibesh Kumar Mishra	BJP	100,496	50.16	Rishi Mishra	INC	78,634	39.25	21,862	10.91
Muzaffarpur	88	Gaighat	Komal Singh	JD(U)	108,104	48.31	Niranjan Roy	RJD	84,687	37.84	23,417	10.47
Muzaffarpur	89	Aurai	Rama Nishad	BJP	104,085	50.06	Bhogendra Sahni	VIP	46,879	22.55	57,206	27.51
Muzaffarpur	90	Minapur	Ajay Kushwaha	JD(U)	113,411	51.59	Munna Yadav	RJD	79,173	36.01	34,238	15.58
Muzaffarpur	91	Bochahan (SC)	Baby Kumari	LJP(RV)	108,186	49.43	Amar Kumar Paswan	RJD	87,870	40.15	20,316	9.28
Muzaffarpur	92	Sakra (SC)	Aditya Kumar	JD(U)	98,723	47.90	Umesh Kumar Ram	INC	83,673	40.60	15,050	7.30
Muzaffarpur	93	Kurhani	Kedar Prasad Gupta	BJP	107,811	46.49	Sunil Kumar Suman	RJD	98,093	42.30	9,718	4.19
Muzaffarpur	94	Muzaffarpur	Ranjan Kumar	BJP	100,477	53.43	Bijendra Chaudhary	INC	67,820	36.06	32,657	17.37
Muzaffarpur	95	Kanti	Ajit Kumar	JD(U)	117,299	50.43	Israil Mansuri	RJD	91,504	39.34	25,795	11.09
Muzaffarpur	96	Baruraj	Arun Kumar Singh	BJP	96,879	47.14	Rakesh Kumar	VIP	67,827	33.00	29,052	14.14
Muzaffarpur	97	Paroo	Shankar Prasad Yadav	RJD	95,272	41.76	Madan Chaudhary	RLM	66,445	29.12	28,827	12.64
Muzaffarpur	98	Sahebganj	Raju Kumar Singh	BJP	106,322	48.43	Prithwinath Ray	RJD	92,800	42.27	13,522	6.16
Gopalganj	99	Baikunthpur	Mithilesh Tiwari	BJP	104,133	49.05	Prem Shankar Prasad	RJD	87,180	41.07	13,522	7.98
Gopalganj	100	Barauli	Manjeet Kumar Singh	JD(U)	88,657	45.66	Dilip Kumar Singh	RJD	76,283	39.29	16,953	6.37
Gopalganj	101	Gopalganj	Subhash Singh	BJP	96,892	48.72	Om Prakash Garg	INC	67,920	34.15	28,972	14.57
Gopalganj	102	Kuchaikote	Amrendra Pandey	JD(U)	101,425	50.21	Hari Narayan Singh	INC	76,934	38.08	24,491	12.13
Gopalganj	103	Bhore (SC)	Sunil Kumar	JD(U)	101,469	47.61	Dhananjay	CPI(ML)L	85,306	40.03	16,163	7.58
Gopalganj	104	Hathua	Ramsewak Kushwaha	JD(U)	92,121	46.99	Rajesh Kumar Singh	RJD	79,773	40.69	12,348	6.30
Siwan	105	Siwan	Mangal Pandey	BJP	92,379	48.47	Awadh Bihari Choudhary	RJD	83,009	43.56	9,370	4.91
Siwan	106	Ziradei	Bhism Pratap Kushwaha	JD(U)	66,227	41.94	Amarjeet Kushwaha	CPI(ML)L	63,061	40.27	2,626	1.67
Siwan	107	Darauli (SC)	Vishnu Deo Paswan	LJP(RV)	83,014	47.38	Satyadeo Ram	CPI(ML)L	73,442	41.92	9,572	5.46
Siwan	108	Raghunathpur	Osama Shahab	RJD	88,278	48.81	Vikash Kumar Singh	JD(U)	79,030	43.69	9,248	5.12
Siwan	109	Daraunda	Karanjeet Singh	BJP	87,047	47.02	Amarnath Yadav	CPI(ML)L	60,614	37.15	11,320	9.87
Siwan	110	Barharia	Indradev Patel	JD(U)	93,600	47.51	Arun Kumar Gupta	RJD	81,464	41.35	12,136	6.16
Siwan	111	Goriakothi	Devesh Kant Singh	BJP	105,909	49.64	Anwarul Haque	RJD	93,524	43.84	21,099	5.80
Siwan	112	Maharajganj	Hemnarayan Sah	JD(U)	86,813	46.22	Vishal Jaiswal	RJD	65,714	34.99	12,385	11.23
Saran	113	Ekma	Manoranjan Singh Dhumal	JD(U)	84,077	49.16	Srikant Yadav	RJD	61,369	35.88	22,708	13.28
Saran	114	Manjhi	Randhir Kumar Singh	JD(U)	68,455	38.53	Satyendra Yadav	CPI(M)	58,668	33.02	9,787	5.51
Saran	115	Baniapur	Kedar Nath Singh	BJP	95,606	47.70	Chandani Devi	RJD	80,170	40.00	15,436	7.70
Saran	116	Taraiya	Janak Singh	BJP	85,564	44.21	Shailendra Pratap	RJD	84,235	43.52	1,329	0.69
Saran	117	Marhaura	Jitendra Kumar Rai	RJD	86,118	47.97	Naveen Kumar Singh	JSP	58,016	32.42	27,928	15.55
Saran	118	Chapra	Chhoti Kumari	BJP	86,845	45.86	Khesari Lal Yadav	RJD	79,245	41.84	7,600	4.02
Saran	119	Garkha (SC)	Surendra Ram	RJD	91,134	44.78	Simant Mrinal	LJP(RV)	78,330	38.49	12,804	6.29
Saran	120	Amnour	Krishna Kumar Mantoo	BJP	75,525	44.52	Sunil Kumar	RJD	71,717	42.27	3,808	2.25
Saran	121	Parsa	Karishma Rai	RJD	89,093	49.16	Chhote Lal Ray	JD(U)	63,321	34.94	25,772	14.22
Saran	122	Sonpur	Vinay Kumar Singh	BJP	90,842	45.59	Ramanuh Prasad	RJD	86,075	43.20	4,767	2.39
Vaishali	123	Hajipur	Awadhesh Singh	BJP	113,221	50.27	Deo Kumar Chaurasia	RJD	94,712	42.05	18,509	8.22
Vaishali	124	Lalganj	Sanjay Kumar Singh	BJP	127,650	53.14	Shivani Shukla	RJD	95,483	39.75	32,167	13.39
Vaishali	125	Vaishali	Siddharth Patel	JD(U)	108,377	45.60	Ajay Kumar Kushwaha	RJD	75,787	31.89	32,590	13.71
Vaishali	126	Mahua	Sanjay Kumar Singh	LJP(RV)	87,641	41.47	Mukesh Kumar Raushan	RJD	42,644	20.18	44,997	21.29
Vaishali	127	Raja Pakar (SC)	Mahendra Ram	JD(U)	96,258	52.31	Pratima Kumari	INC	48,069	26.12	48,189	26.19
Vaishali	128	Raghopur	Tejashwi Yadav	RJD	118,597	49.74	Satish Kumar Yadav	BJP	104,065	43.64	14,472	6.10
Vaishali	129	Mahnar	Umesh Kushwaha	JD(U)	98,050	48.59	Ravindra Kumar Singh	RJD	59,492	29.48	38,558	19.11
Vaishali	130	Patepur (SC)	Lakhendra Raushan	BJP	108,356	51.71	Prema Chaudhary	RJD	85,976	41.03	22,380	10.68
Samastipur	131	Kalyanpur (SC)	Maheshwar Hazari	JD(U)	118,162	49.30	Ranjeet Kumar Ram	CPI(ML)L	79,389	33.20	38,586	16.10
Samastipur	132	Warisnagar	Manjarik Mrinal	JD(U)	108,968	46.41	Phoolbabu Singh	CPI(ML)L	74,532	31.75	34,436	14.66
Samastipur	133	Samastipur	Ashwamedh Devi	JD(U)	95,728	48.14	Akhtarul Islam Shahin	RJD	81,853	41.16	13,875	6.98
Samastipur	134	Ujiarpur	Alok Kumar Mehta	RJD	102,707	44.66	Prashant Kumar Pankaj	RLM	86,424	37.58	16,283	7.08
Samastipur	135	Morwa	Ranvijay Sahu	RJD	77,770	39.53	Vidya Sagar Singh Nishad	JD(U)	69,099	35.13	8,671	4.40
Samastipur	136	Sarairanjan	Vijay Kumar Chaudhary	JD(U)	102,792	49.37	Arbind Kumar Sahani	RJD	81,994	39.38	20,798	9.99
Samastipur	137	Mohiuddinnagar	Rajesh Kumar Singh	BJP	89,208	48.68	Ejya Yadav	RJD	77,526	42.31	11,682	6.37
Samastipur	138	Bibhutipur	Ajay Kumar	CPI(M)	79,246	40.37	Ravina Kushwaha	JD(U)	68,965	35.13	10,281	5.24
Samastipur	139	Rosera (SC)	Birendra Kumar	BJP	122,773	55.02	Braj Kishore Ravi	INC	72,240	32.37	50,533	22.65
Samastipur	140	Hasanpur	Raj Kumar Ray	JD(U)	90,961	44.43	Mala Pushpam	RJD	83,047	40.57	7,914	3.86
Begusarai	141	Cheria-Bariarpur	Sushil Kumar	JD(U)	75,081	39.24	Sushil Kumar	RJD	70,962	37.09	4,119	2.15
Begusarai	142	Bachhwara	Surendra Mehta	BJP	100,343	45.03	Shiv Prakash Garib Das	INC	84,502	37.92	15,841	7.11
Begusarai	143	Teghra	Rajnish Kumar	BJP	112,770	53.04	Ram Ratan Singh	CPI	77,406	36.40	35,364	16.64
Begusarai	144	Matihani	Narendra Kumar Singh	RJD	117,789	47.66	Rajkumar Singh	JD(U)	112,499	45.52	5,290	2.14
Begusarai	145	Sahebpur Kamal	Satanand Sambuddha	RJD	76,798	40.49	Surendra Kumar	LJP(RV)	61,077	32.20	15,721	8.29
Begusarai	146	Begusarai	Kundan Kumar	BJP	119,506	52.31	Amita Bhushan	INC	88,874	38.90	30,632	13.41
Begusarai	147	Bakhri (SC)	Sanjay Paswan	LJP(RV)	98,511	47.67	Suryakant Paswan	CPI	81,193	39.29	17,318	8.38
Khagaria	148	Alauli (SC)	Ram Chandra Sada	JD(U)	93,208	51.94	Ramvriksh Sada	RJD	57,476	32.03	35,732	19.91
Khagaria	149	Khagaria	Bablu Mandal	JD(U)	93,988	51.29	Chandan Yadav	INC	70,573	38.51	23,415	12.78
Khagaria	150	Beldaur	Panna Lal Singh Patel	JD(U)	106,262	48.87	Mithilesh Kumar Nishad	INC	71,087	32.70	35,175	16.17
Khagaria	151	Parbatta	Aditya Kumar Shorya	LJP(RV)	118,677	55.18	Sanjeev Kumar	RJD	84,638	39.36	34,039	15.82
Bhagalpur	152	Bihpur	Kumar Shailendra	BJP	91,458	52.39	Arpana Kumari Mandal	VIP	61,433	35.19	30,025	17.20
Bhagalpur	153	Gopalpur	Shailesh Kumar Mandal	JD(U)	108,630	56.75	Prem Sagar	VIP	50,495	26.38	58,135	30.37
Bhagalpur	154	Pirpainti (SC)	Murari Paswan	BJP	140,608	56.81	Ram Vilash Pasavan	RJD	87,501	35.36	53,107	21.45
Bhagalpur	155	Kahalgaon	Shubhanand Mukesh	JD(U)	130,767	51.90	Rajnish Bharti	RJD	80,655	32.01	50,112	19.89
Bhagalpur	156	Bhagalpur	Rohit Pandey	BJP	100,770	51.11	Ajit Sharma	INC	87,296	44.28	13,474	6.83
Bhagalpur	157	Sultanganj	Lalit Narayan Mandal	JD(U)	108,712	51.81	Chandan Kumar	RJD	77,576	36.97	31,136	14.84
Bhagalpur	158	Nathnagar	Mithun Yadav	LJP(RV)	118,143	48.92	Sheikh Zeyaul Hassan	RJD	92,719	38.39	25,424	10.53
Banka	159	Amarpur	Jayant Raj Kushwaha	JD(U)	103,944	53.51	Jitendra Singh	INC	70,723	36.41	33,221	17.10
Banka	160	Dhoraiya (SC)	Manish Kumar	JD(U)	113,011	51.21	Tribhuwan Paswan	RJD	90,585	41.05	22,426	10.16
Banka	161	Banka	Ramnarayan Mandal	BJP	95,588	49.58	Sanjay Kumar	CPI	71,824	37.25	23,764	12.33
Banka	162	Katoria (ST)	Puran Lal Tudu	BJP	94,260	48.07	Sweety Sima Hembram	RJD	83,274	42.46	10,986	5.61
Banka	163	Belhar	Manoj Yadav	JD(U)	115,393	50.66	Chanakya Prakash Ranjan	RJD	78,187	34.33	37,206	16.33
Munger	164	Tarapur	Samrat Choudhary	BJP	122,480	56.77	Arun Kumar	RJD	76,637	35.52	45,843	21.25
Munger	165	Munger	Pranav Kumar Yadav	BJP	108,028	51.12	Avinash Kumar Vidyarthi	RJD	89,278	42.25	18,750	8.87
Munger	166	Jamalpur	Nachiketa Mandal	JD(U)	96,683	48.00	Narendra Kumar	IIP	60,455	30.01	36,228	17.99
Lakhisarai	167	Suryagarha	Ramanand Mandal	JD(U)	101,968	42.75	Premsagar Choudhary	RJD	78,107	32.75	23,861	10.00
Lakhisarai	168	Lakhisarai	Vijay Kumar Sinha	BJP	122,408	49.20	Amaresh Kumar	INC	97,468	39.17	24,940	10.03
Sheikhpura	169	Sheikhpura	Randhir Kumar Soni	JD(U)	82,922	50.77	Vijay Kumar Yadav	RJD	60,375	36.96	22,547	13.81
Sheikhpura	170	Barbigha	Kumar Puspanjay	JD(U)	61,882	42.85	Trishuldhari Singh	INC	36,389	25.20	25,493	17.65
Nalanda	171	Asthawan	Jitendra Kumar	JD(U)	90,542	52.13	Ravi Ranjan Kumar	RJD	49,834	28.69	40,708	23.44
Nalanda	172	Biharsharif	Sunil Kumar	BJP	109,304	50.83	Omair Khan	INC	80,136	37.27	29,168	13.56
Nalanda	173	Rajgir (SC)	Kaushal Kishore	JD(U)	107,811	57.87	Bishwanath Chaudhary	CPI(ML)L	52,383	28.12	55,428	29.75
Nalanda	174	Islampur	Ruhel Ranjan	JD(U)	100,487	53.76	Rakesh Kumar Raushan	RJD	68,248	36.51	32,239	17.25
Nalanda	175	Hilsa	Krishnamurari Sharan	JD(U)	96,009	49.73	Shakti Singh Yadav	RJD	79,997	41.44	16,012	8.29
Nalanda	176	Nalanda	Shrawan Kumar	JD(U)	105,432	52.77	Kaushalendra Kumar	INC	72,424	36.25	33,008	16.52
Nalanda	177	Harnaut	Hari Narayan Singh	JD(U)	106,954	55.66	Arun Kumar	INC	58,619	30.50	48,335	25.16
Patna	178	Mokama	Anant Kumar Singh	JD(U)	91,416	49.44	Veena Devi	RJD	63,210	34.18	28,206	15.26
Patna	179	Barh	Siyaram Singh	BJP	99,446	52.51	Karnveer Singh Yadav	RJD	74,633	39.41	24,813	13.10
Patna	180	Bakhtiarpur	Arun Kumar	LJP(RV)	88,520	45.14	Aniruddh Kumar Yadav	RJD	87,539	44.64	981	0.50
Patna	181	Digha	Sanjiv Chaurasiya	BJP	111,001	56.59	Divya Gautam	CPI(ML)L	51,922	26.47	59,079	30.12
Patna	182	Bankipur	Nitin Nabin	BJP	98,299	62.66	Rekha Kumari	RJD	46,363	29.55	51,936	33.11
Patna	183	Kumhrar	Sanjay Kumar Gupta	BJP	100,485	57.91	Indradeep Chandravanshi	INC	52,961	30.52	47,524	27.39
Patna	184	Patna Sahib	Ratnesh Kumar Kushwaha	BJP	130,366	55.44	Shashant Shekhar	INC	91,466	38.90	38,900	16.54
Patna	185	Fatuha	Ramanand Yadav	RJD	90,558	45.69	Rupa Kumari	LJP(RV)	82,566	41.66	7,992	4.03
Patna	186	Danapur	Ram Kripal Yadav	BJP	119,877	54.41	Ritlal Yadav	RJD	90,744	41.19	29,133	13.22
Patna	187	Maner	Bhai Virendra	RJD	110,798	48.99	Jitendra Yadav	LJP(RV)	90,764	40.14	20,034	8.85
Patna	188	Phulwari (SC)	Shyam Rajak	JD(U)	126,470	49.18	Gopal Ravidas	CPI(ML)L	93,813	36.48	32,657	12.70
Patna	189	Masaurhi (SC)	Arun Manjhi	JD(U)	106,505	47.16	Rekha Devi	RJD	98,862	43.78	7,643	3.38
Patna	190	Paliganj	Sandeep Saurav	CPI(ML)L	81,105	44.48	Sunil Kumar	LJP(RV)	74,450	40.83	6,655	3.65
Patna	191	Bikram	Siddharth Saurav	BJP	101,189	47.02	Anil Kumar	INC	95,588	44.42	5,601	2.60
Bhojpur	192	Sandesh	Radha Charan Sah	JD(U)	80,598	43.99	Dipu Singh	RJD	80,571	43.97	27	0.02
Bhojpur	193	Barhara	Raghvenda Pratap Singh	BJP	79,593	43.71	Ashok Kumar Singh	RJD	65,190	35.80	14,403	7.91
Bhojpur	194	Arrah	Sanjay Singh Tiger	BJP	94,201	50.98	Quyamuddin Ansari	CPI(ML)L	74,620	40.38	19,581	10.60
Bhojpur	195	Agiaon (SC)	Mahesh Paswan	BJP	69,412	45.20	Shiv Prakash Ranjan	CPI(ML)L	69,217	45.14	95	0.06
Bhojpur	196	Tarari	Vishal Prashant	BJP	96,887	49.59	Madan Singh	CPI(ML)L	85,423	43.72	11,464	5.87
Bhojpur	197	Jagdishpur	Shri Bhagwan Singh Kushwaha	JD(U)	92,974	49.39	Kishore Kunal	RJD	74,781	39.73	18,193	9.66
Bhojpur	198	Shahpur	Rakesh Ranjan	BJP	88,655	49.69	Rahul Tiwari	RJD	73,430	41.16	15,225	8.53
Buxar	199	Brahampur	Shambhu Nath Yadav	RJD	95,828	46.43	Hulas Pande	LJP(RV)	92,608	44.87	3,220	1.56
Buxar	200	Buxar	Anand Mishra	BJP	84,901	45.01	Sanjay Kumar Tiwari	INC	56,548	29.98	28,353	15.03
Buxar	201	Dumraon	Rahul Kumar Singh	JD(U)	79,411	40.37	Ajit Kushwaha	CPI(ML)L	77,306	39.30	2,105	1.07
Buxar	202	Rajpur (SC)	Santosh Kumar Nirala	JD(U)	80,701	38.19	Vishwanath Ram	INC	71,565	33.86	9,136	4.33
Kaimur	203	Ramgarh	Satish Kumar Singh	BSP	72,689	37.31	Ashok Kumar Singh	BJP	72,659	37.29	30	0.02
Kaimur	204	Mohania (SC)	Sangita Kumari	BJP	76,290	39.98	Ravi Shankar Paswan	IND	57,538	30.15	18,752	9.83
Kaimur	205	Bhabua	Bharat Bind	BJP	80,039	41.48	Birendra Kumar Singh	RJD	55,624	28.83	24,415	12.65
Kaimur	206	Chainpur	Md. Zama Khan	JD(U)	70,876	30.94	Brij Kishor Bind	RJD	62,514	27.29	8,362	3.65
Rohtas	207	Chenari (SC)	Murari Prasad Gautam	LJP(RV)	95,579	46.44	Mangal Ram	INC	73,591	35.76	21,988	10.68
Rohtas	208	Sasaram	Snehlata Kushwaha	RLM	105,006	47.49	Satendra Sah	RJD	79,563	35.99	25,443	11.50
Rohtas	209	Kargahar	Bashisth Singh	JD(U)	92,485	42.12	Uday Pratap Singh	BSP	56,809	25.87	35,676	16.25
Rohtas	210	Dinara	Alok Kumar Singh	RLM	78,338	41.88	Shashi Shankar Kumar	RJD	67,504	36.09	10,834	5.79
Rohtas	211	Nokha	Nagendra Chandravanshi	JD(U)	93,193	51.12	Anita Devi	RJD	69,139	37.92	24,054	13.20
Rohtas	212	Dehri	Rajeev Ranjan Singh	LJP(RV)	104,022	54.29	Guddu Kumar Chandrawansi	RJD	68,054	35.52	35,968	18.77
Rohtas	213	Karakat	Arun Singh Kushwaha	CPI(ML)L	74,157	37.51	Mahabali Singh	JD(U)	71,321	36.07	2,836	1.44
Arwal	214	Arwal	Manoj Kumar	BJP	79,854	46.66	Maha Nand Singh	CPI(ML)L	65,761	38.43	14,093	8.23
Arwal	215	Kurtha	Pappu Kumar Verma	JD(U)	74,466	44.90	Suday Yadav	RJD	68,985	41.59	5,481	3.31
Jehanabad	216	Jehanabad	Rahul Kumar	RJD	86,402	44.64	Chandeshwar Prasad	JD(U)	85,609	44.23	793	0.41
Jehanabad	217	Ghosi	Rituraj Kumar	JD(U)	80,740	47.05	Ram Bali Singh Yadav	CPI(ML)L	68,811	40.10	11,929	6.95
Jehanabad	218	Makhdumpur (SC)	Subedar Das	RJD	74,769	44.93	Rani Kumari	LJP(RV)	72,939	43.83	1,830	1.10
Aurangabad	219	Goh	Amrendra Kushwaha	RJD	93,624	44.23	Ranvijay Kumar	BJP	89,583	42.32	4,041	1.91
Aurangabad	220	Obra	Prakash Chandra	LJP(RV)	91,638	44.83	Rishi Kumar	RJD	79,625	38.95	12,013	5.88
Aurangabad	221	Nabinagar	Chetan Anand	JD(U)	80,380	42.29	Amod Chandravanshi	RJD	80,268	42.23	112	0.06
Aurangabad	222	Kutumba (SC)	Lalan Ram	HAM(S)	84,727	48.79	Rajesh Kumar	INC	63,202	36.40	21,525	12.39
Aurangabad	223	Aurangabad	Trivikram Narayan Singh	BJP	87,200	43.38	Anand Shankar Singh	INC	80,406	40.00	6,794	3.38
Aurangabad	224	Rafiganj	Pramod Kumar Singh	JD(U)	107,515	47.95	Ghulam Shahid	RJD	95,559	42.61	11,956	5.34
Gaya	225	Gurua	Upendra Prasad	BJP	99,758	49.02	Vinay Kumar	RJD	75,564	37.13	24,194	11.89
Gaya	226	Sherghati	Uday Kumar Singh	LJP(RV)	77,270	38.13	Pramod Verma	RJD	63,746	31.46	13,524	6.67
Gaya	227	Imamganj (SC)	Deepa Manjhi	HAM(S)	1,04,861	50.83	Ritu Priya Chaudhary	RJD	79,005	38.30	25,856	12.53
Gaya	228	Barachatti (SC)	Jyoti Devi	HAM(S)	108,271	47.44	Tanushree Manjhi	RJD	99,378	43.54	8,893	3.90
Gaya	229	Bodh Gaya (SC)	Kumar Sarvjeet	RJD	100,236	43.38	Shyam Deo Paswan	LJP(RV)	99,355	43.00	881	0.38
Gaya	230	Gaya Town	Prem Kumar	BJP	90,878	54.43	Akhaury Onkar Nath	INC	64,455	38.61	26,423	15.82
Gaya	231	Tikari	Ajay Kumar Dangi	RJD	97,550	45.79	Anil Kumar	HAM(S)	95,492	44.83	2,058	0.96
Gaya	232	Belaganj	Manorama Devi	JD(U)	95,685	46.67	Vishwanath Kumar Singh	RJD	92,803	45.27	2,882	1.40
Gaya	233	Atri	Romit Kumar	HAM(S)	102,102	51.66	Vaijayanti Devi	RJD	76,325	38.62	25,777	13.04
Gaya	234	Wazirganj	Birendra Singh	BJP	94,574	44.99	Awadhesh Singh	INC	81,841	38.93	12,733	6.06
Nawada	235	Rajauli (SC)	Vimal Rajbanshi	LJP(RV)	90,272	44.98	Pinki Bharati	RJD	86,319	43.01	3,953	1.97
Nawada	236	Hisua	Anil Singh	BJP	95,885	44.40	Nitu Kumari	INC	68,036	31.51	27,849	12.89
Nawada	237	Nawada	Vibha Devi Yadav	JD(U)	87,423	43.39	Kaushal Yadav	RJD	59,829	29.69	27,594	13.70
Nawada	238	Gobindpur	Binita Mehta	LJP(RV)	72,581	40.12	Purnima Devi	RJD	49,675	27.46	22,906	12.66
Nawada	239	Warisaliganj	Anita Mahto	RJD	97,833	48.72	Aruna Devi	BJP	90,290	44.96	7,543	3.76
Jamui	240	Sikandra (SC)	Prafull Manjhi	HAM(S)	91,603	47.16	Uday Narain Choudhary	RJD	67,696	34.85	23,907	12.31
Jamui	241	Jamui	Shreyashi Singh	BJP	1,23,868	57.02	Mohammad Shamsad Alam	RJD	69,370	31.93	54,498	25.09
Jamui	242	Jhajha	Damodar Rawat	JD(U)	108,317	44.42	Jai Prakash Yadav	RJD	104,055	42.67	4,262	1.75
Jamui	243	Chakai	Savitri Devi	RJD	80,357	34.51	Sumit Kumar Singh	JD(U)	67,385	28.94	12,972	5.57

== Aftermath ==
=== Government formation ===
Following the election result, the incumbent chief minister Nitish Kumar tendered his resignation to the governor on 17 November. He took oath for a record tenth time as chief minister on 20 November. Incumbent deputy chief ministers Samrat Chaudhary and Vijay Kumar Sinha took oath for the second consecutive time.

Nitish Kumar resigned as the chief minister on 14 April 2026 after being elected to the Rajya Sabha. He was succededed by his deputy Samrat Chaudhary, who became the first BJP CM of Bihar. Vijay Kumar Chaudhary and Bijendra Prasad Yadav were sworn in as the deputy chief ministers.

=== Reactions ===
After the election results were announced, Prime Minister Narendra Modi reacted to NDA's landslide election victory by emphasizing development, good governance, and unity. He thanked the people of Bihar for their historic mandate and praised party workers for their hard work. Nitish Kumar thanked Modi and the other NDA allies for their support.

Ashok Singhal, a cabinet minister of the Chief Minister of Assam, Himanta Biswa Sarma, posted a picture of a cauliflower farm, with the caption 'Bihar approves Gobi farming'. MGB alleges this was a reference to the 1989 Bhagalpur riots, in which an attempt was made to hide a mass grave containing the bodies of 115 Muslims killed by Hindus by planting cauliflower seeds over the soil. The cauliflower had emerged as a insider dog whistle among Hindu nationalists and Hindu fundamentalists, which emerged during the communal clashes at Nagpur that occurred earlier that year.

== See also ==
- 2025 elections in India
- 2025 Indian electoral controversy
- Elections in Bihar
- Politics of Bihar
- Special Intensive Revision (SIR)
