= Vishal Shah =

Indian politician

Member of the Bihar Legislative Assembly
- Incumbent
- Assumed office 2025
- Preceded by: Shamim Ahmad
- Constituency: Narkatia

Personal details
- Party: Janata Dal (United)
- Occupation: Politician

Vishal Shah is an Indian politician from Bihar. He was elected to the Bihar Legislative Assembly from the Narkatiya Assembly constituency in the 2025 state elections as a candidate of the Janata Dal (United). He defeated two-term MLA and former minister Shamim Ahmad of the Rashtriya Janata Dal, securing 1,04,450 votes against Ahmad's 1,03,007. Shah previously served as the youth district president of the Janata Dal (United) and was later appointed as a political advisor to the party at the state level.
