= Ramanand Mandal =

Indian politician

Member of the Bihar Legislative Assembly
- Incumbent
- Assumed office 14 November 2025
- Preceded by: Prahlad Yadav
- Constituency: Suryagarha

Personal details
- Born: Bihar, India
- Party: Janata Dal (United)
- Parent: Visheshwar Ojha (father)
- Profession: Politician

Ramanand Mandal is an Indian politician from Bihar. He is elected as a Member of Legislative Assembly in 2025 Bihar Legislative Assembly election from Suryagarha constituency.

Ramanand Mandal won from Suryagarha constituency representing Janata Dal (United) in the 2025 Bihar Legislative Assembly election. He polled 1,01,968 votes and defeated his nearest rival, Premsagar Choudhary of Rashtriya Janata Dal, by a margin of 23,861 votes. Earlier he contested in 2020 Bihar Legislative Assembly election and lost to RJD candidate Prahlad Yadav.
