= Sangita Kumari =

Sangita Kumari may refer to:

- Sangita Kumari (field hockey)
- Sangita Kumari (politician)
