= Rajesh Kumar (born 1969) =

Indian politician (born 1969)

President Bihar Pradesh Congress Committee
- Incumbent
- Assumed office 18 March 2025
- Preceded by: Akhilesh Prasad Singh

Member of Bihar Legislative Assembly
- In office 8 November 2015 – 14 November 2025
- Preceded by: Lallan Ram
- Succeeded by: Lallan Ram
- Constituency: Kutumba

Personal details
- Born: 5 January 1969 (age 57) Aurangabad, Bihar, India

Rajesh Kumar (born 5 January 1969) is an Indian politician from Bihar and current Bihar Pradesh Congress Committee president. He was a member of the Bihar Legislative Assembly from Kutumba Assembly constituency which is reserved for Scheduled Caste community in Aurangabad district. He won the 2020 Bihar Legislative Assembly election representing the Indian National Congress. He lost his seat in the 2025 Bihar Legislative Assembly election.

== Early life and education ==
Kumar is from Obra, Aurangabad district, Bihar. He is the son of Dilkeshwar Ram. He completed his graduation in 1989 at Saint Columbus College, Hazaribagh, which is affiliated with Ranchi University. He runs his own business.

== Career ==
Kumar became an MLA for the first time winning from Kutumba Assembly constituency representing Indian National Congress in the 2015 Bihar Legislative Assembly election. In 2015, he polled 51,303 votes and defeated his nearest rival, Santosh Suman Manjhi of Hindustani Awam Morcha, by a margin of 10,098 votes. He retained the seat winning the 2020 Bihar Legislative Assembly election where he polled 50,822 votes and defeated his nearest rival, Shravan Bhuyan of Hindustani Awam Morcha (Secular), by a margin of 16,653 votes. He lost his seat in 2025 Bihar Legislative Assembly election where he polled 63,202 votes and was defeated by 21,525 votes by HAM candidate Lallan Ram.

=== President of Bihar Pradesh Congress Committee ===
On 18 March 2025, he was appointed as the president of Bihar Pradesh Congress Committee by AICC president Mallikarjun Kharge.
