= Lalan Ram =

Indian politician

Member of Bihar Legislative Assembly
- Incumbent
- Assumed office 14 November 2025
- Preceded by: Rajesh Kumar
- In office 24 November 2010 – 8 November 2015
- Preceded by: Constituency Established
- Succeeded by: Rajesh Kumar
- Constituency: Kutumba

Personal details
- Party: Hindustani Awam Morcha
- Other political affiliations: Janata Dal (United)
- Profession: Politician

Lalan Ram is an Indian politician from Bihar. He is elected as a Member of Legislative Assembly in 2025 Bihar Legislative Assembly election from Kutumba constituency.
