= Kargahar Assembly constituency =

Assembly constituency in Bihar, India

Coordinates: 25.13°N 83.93°E

Kargahar
- Constituency No. 209 for the Bihar Legislative Assembly

Constituency details
- Country: India
- Region: East India
- State: Bihar
- District: Rohtas
- Lok Sabha constituency: Sasaram
- Established: 2008
- Total electors: 331,884
- Reservation: None

Member of Legislative Assembly
- 18th Bihar Legislative Assembly
- Incumbent Bashisth Singh
- Party: JD(U)
- Alliance: NDA
- Elected year: 2025

Kargahar is an assembly constituency for Bihar Legislative Assembly in Rohtas district. It comes under Sasaram Lok Sabha constituency.

== Members of the Legislative Assembly ==
Election	Name	Party
Until 2008: Constituency did not exist
2010	Ram Dhani Singh	Janata Dal
2015	Bashisth Singh	Janata Dal
2020	Santosh Kumar Mishra	Indian National Congress
2025	Bashisth Singh	Janata Dal

== Election results ==
=== 2025 ===
2025 Bihar Legislative Assembly election: Kargahar
Party	Candidate	Votes	%	±%
JD(U)	Bashisth Singh	92,485	42.12	▲13.46
BSP	Uday Pratap Singh	56,809	25.87	▲1.52
INC	Santosh Kumar Mishra	39,333	17.91	▼12.85
JSP	Ritesh Pandey	16,298	7.42	
Independent	Shiv Kumar Singh	3,097	1.41	
Independent	Govardhan Singh	2,499	1.14	
CPI	Mahendra Prasad Gupta	2,362	1.08	
NOTA	None of the above	3,013	1.37	▲1.01
Majority		35,676	16.25	▲14.15
Turnout		219,564	66.16	▲6.36
JD(U) gain from INC		Swing		

=== 2020 ===
2020 Bihar Legislative Assembly election: Kargahar
Party	Candidate	Votes	%	±%
INC	Santosh Kumar Mishra	59,763	30.76	
JD(U)	Bashisth Singh	55,680	28.66	−3.42
BSP	Uday Pratap Singh	47,321	24.35	+11.03
LJP	Rakesh Kumar Singh	16,988	8.74	
NOTA	None of the above	709	0.36	−0.48
Majority		4,083	2.1	−5.16
Turnout		194,298	59.8	−0.04
INC gain from JD(U)		Swing		

=== 2015 ===
2015 Bihar Legislative Assembly election: Kargahar
Party	Candidate	Votes	%	±%
JD(U)	Bashisth Singh	57,018	32.08	
RLSP	Birendra Kumar Singh	44,111	24.82	
Independent	Alok Kumar Singh	27,454	15.45	
BSP	Md. Shamim Shah	23,677	13.32	
SP	Ram Dhani Singh	6,121	3.44	
SS	Shashikant Tiwari	2,996	1.69	
Independent	Neeraj Shukla	2,765	1.56	
Independent	Shiv Shankar Singh	2,422	1.36	
Independent	Pankaj Kumar Singh	1,740	0.98	
NOTA	None of the above	1,491	0.84	
Majority		12,907	7.26	
Turnout		177,750	59.84	
