= Bashisth Singh =

Indian politician

Member of the Bihar Legislative Assembly
- Incumbent
- Assumed office 14 November 2025
- Preceded by: Santosh Kumar Mishra
- In office 2015–2020
- Preceded by: Ram Dhani Singh
- Succeeded by: Santosh Kumar Mishra
- Constituency: Kargahar

Personal details
- Party: Janata Dal (United)
- Profession: Politician

Bashisth Singh is an Indian politician from Bihar. He is elected as a Member of Legislative Assembly twice from Kargahar constituency.

Bashisth Singh won from Kargahar constituency representing Janata Dal (United) in the 2025 Bihar Legislative Assembly election. He polled 92,485 votes and defeated his nearest rival, Uday Pratap Singh of Bahujan Samaj Party, by a margin of 35,676 votes.
