= Kutumba Assembly constituency =

Assembly constituency in Bihar, India

Coordinates: 24.62°N 84.23°E

Kutumba
- Constituency No. 222 for the Bihar Legislative Assembly

Constituency details
- Country: India
- Region: East India
- State: Bihar
- District: Aurangabad
- Lok Sabha constituency: Aurangabad
- Established: 2008
- Reservation: SC

Member of Legislative Assembly
- 18th Bihar Legislative Assembly
- Incumbent Lalan Singh
- Party: HAM(S)
- Alliance: NDA
- Elected year: 2025

Kutumba is an assembly constituency for Bihar Legislative Assembly in Aurangabad district, Bihar. It comes under Aurangabad (Bihar Lok Sabha constituency), along with other assembly constituencies viz Rafiganj, Aurangabad, Gurua, Imamganj and Tikari.

== Members of the Legislative Assembly ==
Year	Name	Party
Until 2008: Constituency did not exist
2010	Lalan Ram	Janata Dal (United)
2015	Rajesh Kumar	Indian National Congress
2020	Rajesh Kumar	Indian National Congress
2025	Lalan Ram	Hindustani Awam Morcha

== Election results ==
=== 2025 ===
2025 Bihar Legislative Assembly election: Kutumba
Party	Candidate	Votes	%	±%
HAM(S)	Lalan Ram	84,727	48.79	▲24.18
INC	Rajesh Kumar	63,202	36.4	▼0.21
JSP	Shyam Bali Ram	6,065	3.49	
ASP(KR)	Ram Janam Ram	6,022	3.47	
Independent	Viramanu Kumar Bhushan	2,578	1.48	
BSP	Prakash Kumar	2,549	1.47	▼1.41
NOTA	None of the above	2,614	1.51	▼0.35
Majority		21,525	12.39	▲0.39
Turnout		173,644	63.69	▲11.69
HAM(S) gain from INC		Swing		

=== 2020 ===
2020 Bihar Legislative Assembly election: Kutumba
Party	Candidate	Votes	%	±%
INC	Rajesh Kumar	50,822	36.61	−6.13
HAM(S)	Sharwan Bhuiya	34,169	24.61	−9.72
Independent	Lalan Ram	20,433	14.72	
LJP	Sarun Paswan	11,800	8.5	
BSP	Krishna Ram	3,997	2.88	−0.97
Independent	Sateyendra Ram	2,863	2.06	
BMP	Harikrishna Paswan	2,304	1.66	+0.27
Independent	Vikesh Paswan	2,134	1.54	
Independent	Ranjeet Sagar	1,796	1.29	
JAP(L)	Anil Kumar	1,682	1.21	−1.68
Bhartiya Sarvodaya Party	Vikash Kumar Paswan	1,289	0.93	
NOTA	None of the above	2,586	1.86	−1.94
Majority		16,653	12.0	+3.59
Turnout		138,825	52.0	+2.63
INC hold		Swing		

=== 2015 ===
2015 Bihar Legislative Assembly election: Kutumba
Party	Candidate	Votes	%	±%
INC	Rajesh Kumar	51,303	42.74	
HAM(S)	Santosh Kumar Suman	41,205	34.33	
Independent	Suresh Paswan	6,640	5.53	
BSP	Soni Lal Raman	4,620	3.85	
JAP(L)	Sudeshwar Kumar	3,475	2.89	
CPI(ML)L	Munarik Ram	1,675	1.4	
BMP	Sheo Kumar Ram	1,669	1.39	
Socialist Party (India)	Ganesh Paswan	1,490	1.24	
Loktantrik Sarvjan Samaj Party	Ranjeet Kumar	1,237	1.03	
Independent	Sanjay Kumar Ram	1,193	0.99	
NOTA	None of the above	4,556	3.8	
Majority		10,098	8.41	
Turnout		120,039	49.37	
gain from		Swing		
