= Vishal Kumar (politician) =

Indian politician

Member-Bihar Legislative Assembly
- Incumbent
- Assumed office 2025
- Preceded by: Shamim Ahmad
- Constituency: Narkatiya

Personal details
- Party: Janata Dal (United)
- Relations: Vishwambhar Nath Prasad (Father)
- Education: M.S. College, Motihari, BRABU Muzaffarpur
- Profession: Farmer, Business

Vishal Kumar is an Indian politician and a member of the Bihar Legislative Assembly (MLA). He belongs to the Kalwar (Vaishya) community of East Champaran.He hails from Narkatiya in the East Champaran district of Bihar. Vishal Kumar holds a degree in Science from M.S. College, Muzaffarpur. A member of the Janata Dal (United) party, he contested and won the Narkatiya Assembly constituency in the 2025 Bihar Legislative Assembly election to become an MLA.

== Electoral performance ==
=== 2025 ===
2025 Bihar Legislative Assembly election: Narkatiya
Party	Candidate	Votes	%	±%
JD(U)	Vishal Kumar	104,450	46.70	+15.17
RJD	Shamim Ahmad	103,007	46.06	−0.63
JSP	Lal Babu Prasad	7,002	3.13	+3.13
NOTA	None of the Above	5,425	2.43	
Majority		1,443	0.64	
Turnout		223,643		
JD(U) gain from RJD		Swing	+0.64	

(Detailed Results at: https://results.eci.gov.in/ResultAcGenNov2025/ConstituencywiseS0412.htm)
