= Narkatiya Assembly constituency =

Coordinates: 26°44′36″N 84°49′41″E

Narkatiya
- Constituency No. 12 for the Bihar Legislative Assembly

Constituency details
- Country: India
- Region: East India
- State: Bihar
- Division: Tirhut
- District: East Champaran
- Established: 2008
- Total electors: 301,008
- Reservation: None

Member of Legislative Assembly
- 18th Bihar Legislative Assembly
- Incumbent Vishal Kumar
- Party: JD(U)
- Alliance: NDA
- Elected year: 2025
- Preceded by: Shamim Ahmad

Narkatiya is an assembly constituency in East Champaran district in the Indian state of Bihar.

== Overview ==
As per orders of Delimitation of Parliamentary and Assembly constituencies Order, 2008, 12. Narkatiya Assembly constituency is composed of the following: community development blocks of Banjaria, Chhauradano (Narkatia) and Bankatwa.

Narkatiya Assembly constituency is part of 2. Paschim Champaran Lok Sabha constituency.

== Members of the Legislative Assembly ==
| Year | Name | Party |
|---|---|---|
Until 2008: Constituency did not exist
| 2010 | Shyam Bihari Prasad | Janata Dal (United) |
| 2015 | Shamim Ahmad | Rashtriya Janata Dal |
| 2020 | Shamim Ahmad | Rashtriya Janata Dal |
| 2025 | Vishal Kumar | Janata Dal (United) |

== Election results ==
=== 2025 ===
2025 Bihar Legislative Assembly election: Narkatiya
| Party | Candidate | Votes | % | ±% |
|---|---|---|---|---|
| JD(U) | Vishal Kumar | 104,450 | 46.7 | +15.17 |
| RJD | Shamim Ahmad | 103,007 | 46.06 | −0.63 |
| JSP | Lal Babu Prasad | 7,002 | 3.13 | |
| NOTA | None of the above | 5,425 | 2.43 | −0.26 |
| Majority | | 1,443 | 0.64 | −14.52 |
| Turnout | | 223,643 | 74.22 | +10.58 |
| JD(U) gain from RJD | | Swing | +0.64 | |

=== 2020 ===
Bihar Assembly election, 2020: Narkatiya
| Party | Candidate | Votes | % | ±% |
|---|---|---|---|---|
| RJD | Shamim Ahmad | 85,562 | 46.69 | +0.73 |
| JD(U) | Shyam Bihari Prasad | 57,771 | 31.53 | |
| LJP | Sonu Kumar | 20,494 | 11.18 | |
| Independent | Suresh Prasad Yadav | 6,149 | 3.36 | |
| Independent | Sanjay Kumar | 2,104 | 1.15 | |
| Independent | Vidyanand Prasad | 1,706 | 0.93 | |
| NOTA | None of the above | 4,936 | 2.69 | −2.78 |
| Majority | | 27,791 | 15.16 | +2.93 |
| Turnout | | 183,251 | 63.64 | +0.02 |
| RJD hold | | Swing | | |

=== 2015 ===
2015 Bihar Legislative Assembly election: Narkatiya
| Party | Candidate | Votes | % | ±% |
|---|---|---|---|---|
| RJD | Shamim Ahmad | 75,118 | 45.96 | |
| RLSP | Sant Singh Kushwaha | 55,136 | 33.73 | |
| Independent | Sonu Kumar | 12,890 | 7.89 | |
| Independent | Sunil Kumar | 2,750 | 1.68 | |
| CPI(ML)L | Dinesh Prasad | 2,177 | 1.33 | |
| BSP | Anwar Alam Ansari | 1,991 | 1.22 | |
| NOTA | None of the above | 8,938 | 5.47 | |
| Majority | | 19,982 | 12.23 | |
| Turnout | | 163,447 | 63.62 | |
| RJD gain from JD(U) | | Swing | | |

=== 2010 ===
2010 Bihar Legislative Assembly election: Narkatiya
| Party | Candidate | Votes | % | ±% |
|---|---|---|---|---|
| JD(U) | Shyam Bihari Prasad | 31,549 | 26.50 | |
| LJP | Yasmin Sabir Ali | 23,861 | 20.04 | |
| Independent | Shamim Ahmad | 14,217 | 11.94 | |
| INC | Sonu Kumar | 13,813 | 11.60 | |
| Independent | Shashi Bhushan Singh | 10,794 | 9.07 | |
| Majority | | 7,688 | 6.46 | |
| Turnout | | 1,19,067 | 58.25 | |
| JD(U) win (new seat) | | | | |
