= Ekma Assembly constituency =

Coordinates: 25°58′28″N 84°33′23″E

Ekma
- Constituency No. - for the Bihar Legislative Assembly

Constituency details
- Country: India
- Region: East India
- State: Bihar
- District: Saran
- Established: 1951
- Total electors: 291,675

Member of Legislative Assembly
- 18th Bihar Legislative Assembly
- Incumbent Manoranjan Singh Dhumal
- Party: JD(U)
- Alliance: NDA
- Elected year: 2025

Ekma is an assembly constituency in Saran district in the Indian state of Bihar.

== Overview ==
As per Delimitation of Parliamentary and Assembly constituencies Order, 2008, No. 113 Ekma Assembly constituency is composed of the following: Ekma and Lahladpur community development blocks; Mohmmadpur, Bhajouna Nachap, atarsan ashahni, nawada, Bhalua Bujurg, Mobarakpur, Matiyar, Chephul and Gobrahi gram panchayats of Manjhi CD Block, Parsagarh Dakshani, Uttari and Puri of Ekma Block.

Ekma Assembly constituency is part of No. 19 Maharajganj (Lok Sabha constituency). It has a railway station.

== Members of the Legislative Assembly ==
| Election | Name | Party |
|---|---|---|
| 1952 | Lakshmi Narayan Singh | Indian National Congress |
1957-2008: Constituency did not exist
| 2010 | Manoranjan Singh | Janata Dal (United) |
| 2015 | Manoranjan Singh | Janata Dal (United) |
| 2020 | Srikant Yadav | Rashtriya Janata Dal |
| 2025 | Manoranjan Singh | Janata Dal (United) |

== Election results ==
=== 2025 ===
2025 Bihar Legislative Assembly election: Ekma
| Party | Candidate | Votes | % | ±% |
|---|---|---|---|---|
| JD(U) | Manoranjan Singh | 84,077 | 49.16 | +23.17 |
| RJD | Srikant Yadav | 61,369 | 35.88 | +0.83 |
| JSP | Deo Kumar Singh | 7,642 | 4.47 | |
| BSP | Lakshman Manjhi | 2,992 | 1.75 | |
| Independent | Rakesh Kumar Singh | 2,460 | 1.44 | |
| Independent | Shankar Sharma | 1,600 | 0.94 | |
| NOTA | None of the above | 6,217 | 3.63 | +0.67 |
| Majority | | 22,708 | 13.28 | +4.22 |
| Turnout | | 171,043 | 58.64 | +7.98 |
| JD(U) gain from RJD | | Swing | | |

=== 2020 ===
2020 Bihar Legislative Assembly election: Ekma
| Party | Candidate | Votes | % | ±% |
|---|---|---|---|---|
| RJD | Srikant Yadav | 53,875 | 35.05 | |
| JD(U) | Sita Devi | 39,948 | 25.99 | −9.33 |
| LJP | Kameshwar Ku Singh | 29,992 | 19.51 | |
| Independent | Ranjeet Singh | 10,998 | 7.16 | |
| Independent | Rahulkumar Sah | 3,179 | 2.07 | |
| RLSP | Kushvaha Rajbal Singh | 3,011 | 1.96 | |
| Independent | Narendra Pratap Mishra | 2,890 | 1.88 | −0.73 |
| Independent | Sriram Chaudhari | 1,874 | 1.22 | |
| JAP(L) | Lakshman Singh | 1,455 | 0.95 | −0.94 |
| NOTA | None of the above | 4,545 | 2.96 | −0.82 |
| Majority | | 13,927 | 9.06 | +3.27 |
| Turnout | | 153,697 | 50.66 | +1.1 |
| RJD gain from JD(U) | | Swing | | |

=== 2015 ===
2015 Bihar Legislative Assembly election: Ekma
| Party | Candidate | Votes | % | ±% |
|---|---|---|---|---|
| JD(U) | Manoranjan Singh | 49,508 | 35.32 | |
| BJP | Kameshwar Kumar Singh | 41,382 | 29.53 | |
| Independent | Ranjeet Singh (Harpur) | 28,345 | 20.22 | |
| Independent | Narendra Pratap Mishra | 3,662 | 2.61 | |
| JAP(L) | Sanjay Kumar | 2,651 | 1.89 | |
| Independent | Santosh Kumar | 2,200 | 1.57 | |
| BSP | Kushwaha Rajbal Singh | 2,065 | 1.47 | |
| Independent | Ranjit Singh (Manjhi) | 2,039 | 1.45 | |
| Bhartiya New Sanskar Krantikari Party | Ramesh Kumar Singh | 1,629 | 1.16 | |
| Independent | Binod Singh | 1,378 | 0.98 | |
| NOTA | None of the above | 5,293 | 3.78 | |
| Majority | | 8,126 | 5.79 | |
| Turnout | | 140,152 | 49.56 | |
| Bhartiya New Sanskar Krantikari Party | Ramesh Kumar Singh | 1,629 | 1.16 | |
