= Mohania Assembly constituency =

Assembly constituency in Bihar

- Constituency No. 204 for the Bihar Legislative Assembly

Constituency details
- Country: India
- Region: East India
- State: Bihar
- District: Kaimur
- Established: 1957
- Total electors: 277,850

Member of Legislative Assembly
- 18th Bihar Legislative Assembly
- Incumbent Sangita Kumari
- Party: BJP
- Alliance: NDA
- Elected year: 2025

Mohania is one of 243 constituencies of legislative assembly of Bihar. It comes under Sasaram Lok Sabha constituency.

== Overview ==
Mohania comprises Community Blocks of Kudra & Mohania.

== Members of the Legislative Assembly ==
| Year | Member | Party |
|---|---|---|
| 1957 | Badri Singh | Praja Socialist Party |
| 1962 | Mangal Charan Singh | Indian National Congress |
| 1967 | Ramkrishna Ram | Indian National Congress |
| 1969 | Bhagwat Prasad | Praja Socialist Party |
| 1972 | Suresh Kumar | Indian National Congress |
| 1977 | Ram Krishna Ram | Janata Party |
| 1980 | Mahavir Paswan | Indian National Congress |
| 1985 | Mahavir Paswan | Indian National Congress |
| 1990 | Shiwadhar Paswan | Janata Dal |
| 1995 | Suresh Pasi | Bahujan Samaj Party |
| 2000 | Suresh Pasi | Bahujan Samaj Party |
| 2005 | Suresh Pasi | Rashtriya Janata Dal |
| 2005 | Chhedi Paswan | Janata Dal (United) |
| 2010 | Chhedi Paswan | Janata Dal (United) |
| 2014^ | Niranjan Ram | Bharatiya Janata Party |
| 2015 | Niranjan Ram | Bharatiya Janata Party |
| 2020 | Sangita Kumari | Rashtriya Janata Dal |
| 2025 | Sangita Kumari | Bharatiya Janata Party |

^by-election

== Election results ==
=== 2025 ===
2025 Bihar Legislative Assembly election: Mohania
| Party | Candidate | Votes | % | ±% |
|---|---|---|---|---|
| BJP | Sangita Kumari | 76,290 | 39.98 | ▲9.59 |
| Independent | Ravi Shankar Paswan | 57,538 | 30.15 | |
| BSP | Om Prakash Narayan | 32,263 | 16.91 | |
| JSP | Gita Devi | 14,128 | 7.4 | |
| Independent | Nitu Kumari | 2,205 | 1.16 | |
| NOTA | None of the above | 2,952 | 1.55 | ▼0.84 |
| Majority | | 18,752 | 9.83 | ▲2.38 |
| Turnout | | 190,815 | 68.68 | ▲8.79 |
| BJP gain from RJD | | Swing | | |

=== 2020 ===
Bihar Assembly election, 2020: Mohania
| Party | Candidate | Votes | % | ±% |
|---|---|---|---|---|
| RJD | Sangita Kumari | 61,235 | 37.84 | |
| BJP | Niranjan Ram | 49,181 | 30.39 | −12.93 |
| RLSP | Suman Devi | 39,855 | 24.63 | |
| Rashtrawadi Janlok Party (Satya) | Indrajit Ram | 1,603 | 0.99 | |
| NOTA | None of the above | 3,871 | 2.39 | +0.67 |
| Majority | | 12,054 | 7.45 | +2.06 |
| Turnout | | 161,836 | 59.89 | +3.3 |
| RJD gain from BJP | | Swing | | |

=== 2015 ===
2015 Bihar Legislative Assembly election: Mohania
| Party | Candidate | Votes | % | ±% |
|---|---|---|---|---|
| BJP | Niranjan Ram | 60,911 | 43.32 | |
| INC | Sanjay Kumar | 53,330 | 37.93 | |
| BSP | Ram Raj Ram | 9,921 | 7.06 | |
| Independent | Chandra Shekhar Paswan | 4,530 | 3.22 | |
| CPI(ML)L | Munna Ram | 2,466 | 1.75 | |
| NOTA | None of the above | 2,419 | 1.72 | |
| Majority | | 7,581 | 5.39 | |
| Turnout | | 140,595 | 56.59 | |
