= Suryagarha Assembly constituency =

Assembly constituency in Bihar

- Constituency No. 167 for the Bihar Legislative Assembly

Constituency details
- Country: India
- Region: East India
- State: Bihar
- District: Lakhisarai
- Established: 1951
- Total electors: 358,028
- Reservation: None

Member of Legislative Assembly
- 18th Bihar Legislative Assembly
- Incumbent Ramanand Mandal
- Party: JD(U)
- Alliance: NDA
- Elected year: 2025

Suryagarha Assembly constituency is one of 243 constituencies of legislative assembly of Bihar. It is part of Munger Lok Sabha constituency along with other assembly constituencies viz. Jamalpur, Munger and Lakhisarai.

== Overview ==
Suryagarha comprises CD Blocks Pipariya, Suryagarha, Chanan; Gram Panchayats Garhi Bishanpur, Khagaur & Mahisona of Lakshisarai CD Block.

== Members of the Legislative Assembly ==
Year	Name	Party
1952	Rajeshwari Prasad Singh	Indian National Congress
1957	Karyanand Sharma	Communist Party of India
1962	Rajeshwari Prasad Singh	Indian National Congress
1967	Bhagwat Prasad Mehta	Praja Socialist Party
1969	Sunaina Sharma	Communist Party of India
1972	Sunaina Sharma	Communist Party of India
1977	Ramjee Prasad Mahto	Independent politician
1980	Ramjee Prasad Mahto	Indian National Congress
1985	Alakh Sharma	Indian National Congress
1990	Satish Kumar	Communist Party of India
1995	Prahlad Yadav	Independent politician
2000	Prahlad Yadav	Rashtriya Janata Dal
2005	Prahlad Yadav	Rashtriya Janata Dal
2005	Prem Ranjan Patel	Bharatiya Janata Party
2010	Prem Ranjan Patel	Bharatiya Janata Party
2015	Prahlad Yadav	Rashtriya Janata Dal
2020	Prahlad Yadav	Rashtriya Janata Dal
2025	Ramanand Mandal	Janata Dal (United)

== Election results ==
=== 2025 ===
2025 Bihar Legislative Assembly election: Suryagarha
Party	Candidate	Votes	%	±%
JD(U)	Ramanand Mandal	101,968	42.75	+14.98
RJD	Premsagar Choudhary	78,107	32.75	−0.07
Independent	Ravishanker Prasad Singh	38,175	16.01	
JSP	Amit Sagar	8,429	3.53	
NOTA	None of the above	4,456	1.87	+0.74
Majority		23,861	10.0	+4.95
Turnout		238,507	66.62	+10.59
JD(U) gain from RJD		Swing		

=== 2020 ===
Bihar Assembly election, 2020: Suryagarha
Party	Candidate	Votes	%	±%
RJD	Prahlad Yadav	62,306	32.82	−17.38
JD(U)	Ramanand Mandal	52,717	27.77	
LJP	Ravishanker Prasad Singh	44,797	23.6	
Independent	Bipin Kumar	4,118	2.17	
RLSP	Ganesh Kumar	3,714	1.96	
Independent	Gangadhar Pandey	2,954	1.56	
Independent	Ranjan Kumar	2,164	1.14	
Independent	Murari Singh	2,137	1.13	
Independent	Shankar Sharma Alias Shankar Das Ji Maharaj	1,849	0.97	
NOTA	None of the above	2,147	1.13	−0.52
Majority		9,589	5.05	−13.23
Turnout		189,815	56.03	+4.09
RJD hold				

=== 2015 ===
Bihar Assembly election, 2015: Suryagarha
Party	Candidate	Votes	%	±%
RJD	Prahlad Yadav	82,490	50.2	
BJP	Prem Ranjan Patel	52,460	31.92	
CPI	Pramod Shrma	6,539	3.98	
Independent	Sarvan Kumar Anand	4,765	2.9	
Independent	Nityanand Kumar	4,200	2.56	
Independent	Bikramaditya Kumar Singh	2,908	1.77	
Sarvajan Kalyan Loktantrik Party	Girish Bind	2,152	1.31	
NOTA	None of the above	2,707	1.65	
Majority		30,030	18.28	
Turnout		164,327	51.94	
