= Srikant Yadav =

Indian politician

Member of the Bihar Legislative Assembly
- In office 2020–2025
- Preceded by: Manoranjan Singh
- Succeeded by: Manoranjan Singh
- Constituency: Ekma

Personal details
- Born: 12 May 1985 (age 41) Rajapur, Ekma, Saran district, Bihar
- Party: Rashtriya Janata Dal
- Education: 8th Pass
- Occupation: Politician businessman and social worker

Srikant Yadav (born 24 May 1970) is an Indian politician and a member of the Bihar Legislative Assembly, representing the Ekma Assembly constituency in the Saran district. He is a member of the Rashtriya Janata Dal.

== Early life ==
Srikant Yadav was born to Ram Ekbal Yadav on 24 May 1970 at Rajapur village in Ekma, Saran district of Bihar.

He passed classes 8 from R. Parishad School, Kolkata, West Bengal.
