= Divya Gautam =

Indian academic and politician (born 1991)

Personal details
- Born: 17 January 1991 (age 35) Saharsa, Bihar, India
- Party: Communist Party of India (Marxist–Leninist) Liberation
- Spouse: Suraj Kumar Pandey
- Relations: Bhupendra Kumar Singh (maternal uncle); Sushant Singh Rajput (maternal cousin)
- Parent(s): Lalita Singh (mother); Bhupendra Kumar (father)
- Education: Patna University; M.A. in Women Studies from Tata Institute of Social Sciences, Hyderabad (2014-16); M.A. in Mass Communication Nalanda Open University (2016-2018)

Divya Gautam is an Indian academic, theatre artist and politician from Bihar. She has been announced as the Communist Party of India (Marxist–Leninist) Liberation (CPI(ML) Liberation) candidate from the Digha Assembly constituency in Patna district for the Bihar Legislative Assembly Election 2025. Divya Gautam is the cousin of late actor Sushant Singh Rajput.

== Education ==
Divya Gautam holds a Bachelor's degree in Journalism and Mass Communication from Patna College, affiliated with Patna University. She later pursued a Master of Arts (M.A.) in Women's Studies from the Tata Institute of Social Sciences (TISS), Hyderabad (2014-2016), followed by a second M.A. in Mass Communication from Nalanda Open University (2016-2018). Divya is currently pursuing her PhD in Performance and Cultural Studies at BITS Pilani, under the supervision of Dr Prateek, focusing on the performativity of Bhojpuri cinema.

== Career ==
During her student days, Divya was actively involved in student politics and contested the 2012 Patna University Students' Union election as a candidate of the All India Students Association (AISA). She narrowly lost to Ashish Sinha of the Akhil Bharatiya Vidyarthi Parishad (ABVP). In 2021, Divya cracked the Bihar Public Service Commission Civil Service examination but chose not to join the government service as a supply inspector. Instead, she focused on her passion for education and activism. She also served as an assistant professor at Patna Women's College.
