= Prahlad Yadav =

Indian politician

Bihar Legislative Assembly
- Incumbent
- Assumed office 2015
- Preceded by: Prem Ranjan Patel
- Constituency: Suryagarha

Personal details
- Born: 1 May 1960 (age 66) Pipariya, Lakhisarai, Bihar
- Party: Janata Dal (United)
- Education: Graduate in Science
- Occupation: Farmer
- Profession: Politician

Prahlad Yadav is an Indian politician and a member of Bihar Legislative Assembly of India. He represents the Suryagarha constituency in Lakhisarai district of Bihar. He was elected in 2015 as a member of Rashtriya Janata Dal (RJD). He was part of communist movement in 1980. He has been elected as MLA in 1995 for the first time. He was a founder member of Lalu Prasad Yadav's RJD. He was elected as MLA three times from his constituency.
