= Bankatwa, East Champaran =

Bankatwa बनकटवा
- Community Development Block
- Bankatwa Community Development Block
- Country: India
- State: Bihar
- Division: Tirhut
- District: Purbi Champaran
- Subdivision: Sikrahana

Government
  - Body: Panchayati Raj
- Elevation: 79 m (259 ft)
- PIN code: 845303
- STD code: 06250
- Website: eastchamparan.nic.in

Bankatwa is an administrative Community Development Block in the East Champaran district (also known as Purbi Champaran) of Bihar, India. Governed under the Sikrahana subdivision (Dhaka), it is one of the 27 subdivisions making up the district.
