= Seema Singh =

Indian film actress and dancer (born 1990)

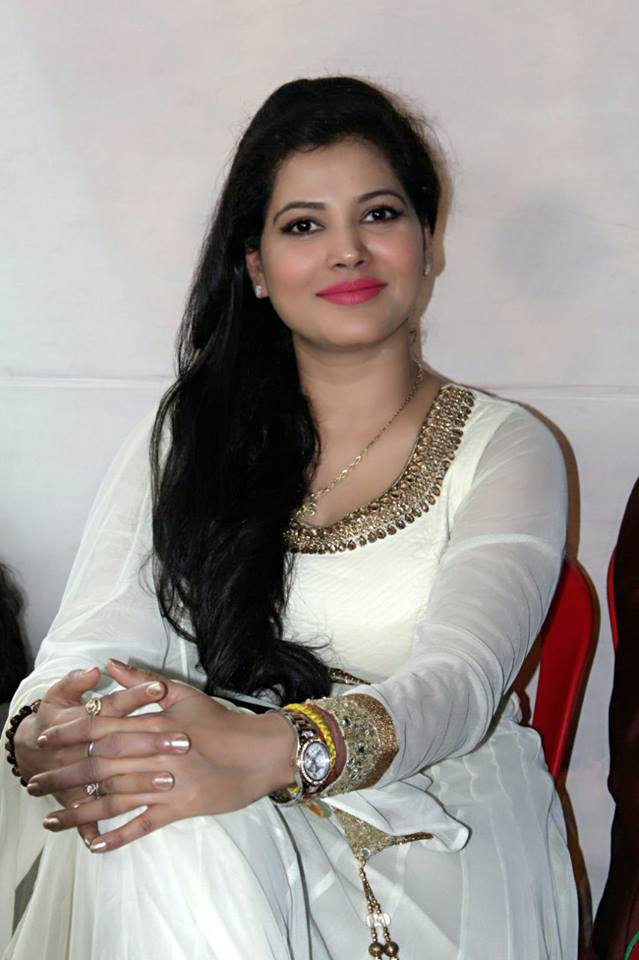
- Born: Seema Kumari Singh; 11 June 1990 (age 36); Mumbai, Maharashtra
- Other names: Item Queen and Helen
- Education: University of Mumbai
- Occupations: Actress, dancer, presenter
- Years active: 2007–present
- Known for: Item songs
- Political party: Lok Janshakti Party (Ram Vilas)
- Spouse: Saurabh Kumar Singh (m. 2019)
- Children: Shivaay
- Awards: Bhojpuri Film Award

Seema Singh (born 11 June 1990) also known as Helen or Item Queen is an Indian politician, film actress, dancer, model, and television presenter. Singh is one of the most famous item song dancers in Bhojpuri cinema Singh has established a career in Bhojpuri film, and is the recipient of several awards, including Bhojpuri Film Awards.

== Personal life ==
Seema Singh is married to Saurav Kumar Singh, a businessman from Barbigha in the Sheikhpura district of Bihar on 13 March 2019. They have one son Shivaay together.

== Career ==
=== Political career ===
Seema Singh with her husband Saurav Kumar Singh, a businessman joined Lok Janshakti Party (Ram Vilas) in the presence of its National President Chirag Paswan on April 4, 2023. She said that she is influenced by the theme of Bihar First Bihari First.

=== Film career ===
Seema Singh made her debut in 2008 as an Item Girl in the movie, Kahan Jaiba Raja Namareea Ladai Ke which was starred by Dinesh Lal Yadav Nirahua.

She then roled as an Item girl in Item songs of Chhodab Na Sang Tohaar (2011), Hum Do Anjaane (2011), Hero (2012), Himmatwala (2012), Diler (2013), Prem Diwani (2013), Raja Babu (2015), Vijaypath (2015), Hum Hai Lootere (2017) and Dream Zindagi (2017).
