= Santosh Kumar Mishra =

Indian politician (born 1978)

Santosh Kumar Mishra (born 1978) is an Indian politician from Bihar. He is an MLA from Kargahar Assembly constituency in Rohtas district. He won the 2020 Bihar Legislative Assembly election representing Indian National Congress.

== Early life and education ==
Mishra is from Kargahar, Rohtas district, Bihar. His late father Girish Narayan Mishra was a farmer. He completed his graduation in engineering.

== Career ==
Mishra won from Kargahar Assembly constituency representing Indian National Congress in the 2020 Bihar Legislative Assembly election. He polled 47,321 votes and defeated his nearest rival, Uday Pratap Singh of Janata Dal (United), by a margin of 4,083 votes.
