= Shamim Ahmad =

Indian politician

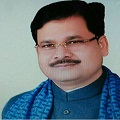
- Shamim Ahmad

Minister of Law Government of Bihar
- In office 30 August 2022 – 15 March 2024
- Chief Minister: Nitish Kumar
- Deputy Chief Minister: Tejashwi Yadav
- Preceded by: Kartik Kumar

Minister of Sugarcane Industries Government of Bihar
- In office 16 August 2022 – 30 August 2022
- Preceded by: Pramod Kumar
- Succeeded by: Kartik Kumar

Member of the Bihar Legislative Assembly
- In office 1 December 2015 – 14 November 2025
- Preceded by: Shyam Bihari Prasad
- Succeeded by: Vishal Kumar
- Constituency: Narkatiya

Personal details
- Born: 6 January 1972 (age 54) Khairwa, Bela Chamahi, Bihar, India
- Party: Rashtriya Janata Dal
- Children: 3
- Education: Babasaheb Bhimrao Ambedkar Bihar University (BAMS); Munshi Singh College, Motihari(BSc.)

Shamim Ahmad (born 6 January 1972, Hindi: शमीम अहमद) is an Indian politician belonging to Rashtriya Janata Dal. He was elected as a member of Bihar Legislative Assembly from Narkatiya in 2015 and 2020.
