= Sangita Kumari (politician) =

Indian politician

Member of the Bihar Legislative Assembly
- Incumbent
- Assumed office 16 November 2020
- Preceded by: Niranjan Ram
- Constituency: Mohania

Personal details
- Born: 1 January 1985 (age 41)
- Party: BJP
- Other political affiliations: RJD

Sangita Kumari (born 1985) is an Indian politician from Bihar. She is a member of the Bihar Legislative Assembly representing the Mohania Assembly constituency in the Kaimur district of Bihar. She won the 2020 Bihar Legislative Assembly election on Rashtriya Janata Dal ticket.

== Early life and education ==
Kumari is from Mohania, Kaimur district. She married Jayendra Kumar. She completed her post graduation in 2008 at Ranchi University, Ranchi. She also did B.Ed in 2009 at Nilamber Pitamber University, Daltonganj.

== Career ==
Kumari won the 2020 Bihar Legislative Assembly election from Mohania Assembly constituency representing Rashtriya Janata Dal. She polled 61,235 votes and defeated her nearest rival, Niranjan Ram of Bharatiya Janata Party, by a margin of 12,054 votes. She joined the Bharatiya Janata Party on 28 February 2024, ahead of the general elections.
