= Mohammad Hidayatullah Khan =

Indian politician

Md Hidayatullah Khan

Speaker of the Bihar Legislative Assembly
- In office 27 March 1989 – 19 March 1990
- Chief Minister: Bindeshwari Dubey
- Preceded by: Shiva Chandra Jha
- Succeeded by: Ghulam Sarwar
- Constituency: Harsidhi

Member of the Bihar Legislative Assembly
- In office 1972–1977
- In office 1980–1995
- Preceded by: Yagul Kishore Prasad Singh
- Succeeded by: Awadhesh Prasad Kushwaha
- Constituency: Harsidhi

Minister of Food and Civil Supplies
- In office 1985–1988

Personal details
- Born: Mohammad Hidayatullah Khan; 1927 Harsidhi, East Champaran district, Bihar
- Died: 7 April 2009 (aged 81–82) Hai Hospital, Patna, Bihar
- Party: Indian National Congress
- Children: 6; (including, Mohammed Umar Saifullah Khan)

Barrister Mohammad Hidayatullah Khan (1927 – 7 April 2009) also known as Barrister Saheb was an Indian politician. He served as Speaker of the Bihar Legislative Assembly from 27 March 1989 to 19 March 1990. He was Minister of Food and Civil Supplies in Bindeshwari Dubey ministry. Khan was Member of Bihar Legislative Assembly from Harsidhi Assembly constituency for 4 terms. He was associated with Indian National Congress. He was President of Bihar Pradesh Congress Committee from 1993 to 1994.
