= Katarmala, Begusarai =

Katarmala South Katarmala
- Village
- Location within Bihar
- Coordinates: 25°30′13″N 86°14′41″E
- Country: India
- State: Bihar
- District: Begusarai
- Subdivision: Balia
- Block: Dandari
- Thana: Dandari

Area
  - Total: 9 km^{2} (3.5 sq mi)
- Elevation: 41 m (135 ft)

Population (2011)
  - Total: 9,843

Languages
  - Official: Maithili, Hindi
- Time zone: UTC+5:30 (IST)
- PIN: 851130
- Telephone code: 06243
- Lok Sabha constituency: Begusarai
- Lok Sabha Member: Bhola Singh
- Vidhan Sabha constituency: Bakhri
- Vidhan Sabha Member: Ramanad Ram

Katarmala is one of the Villages of Begusarai District in Bihar, India. Katarmala South is one of the eight Panchayat of Dandari Block in Ballia Subdivision Katarmala village is the administrative headquarters of Katarmala South Panchayati raj. The district lies on the southern bank of the Budhi Gandak river.

== Geography ==
Katarmala is 18 km from its District Begusarai. It is 117 km from its State capital Patna. Katarmala budhi Gondk flows to the north. Located north of Kataramala are Uttri Katarmala and Menha. Located in the south of Kataramala are Rajopur and Kola. Located in the east of Kataramala Dandari and Mohanpur. And Neema is in the west. The nearest Towns are Nawkothi (9 km), Ballia (9.3 km), Bakhri (11.7 km), and Sahebpur Kamal (13.9 km), the main market is Begusarai city Market.

== Culture ==
Mathili hindulism culture due to it is the part of historic Mithila region.

Fasival: Holi, Rama Navami, Durga Puja, Diwali, Chhath Puja, Saraswti Puja.

== Population ==
According to 2011 the total population of the village is 9,843. The population of male and female are 5109 and 4734. Female to male ratio of Katarmala is 92.66%. It is unsatisfactory and the people should drive some campaign to improve this.
The number of households in Katarmala is 1,640.

=== Literacy ===
The literacy rate of the village is 41.5% compared to the literacy rate of state 47%. The literacy rate of the village is less than state literacy rate. The rate of literacy is very low and needs immediate attention of Union and State Government. . The female literacy rate is 29.48% compared to male literacy rate of 52.68%.

=== Working Population ===
The total working population is 43.4% of the total population. 59.66% of the men are working population . 25.91% of the women are working population. The main working population is 32.06% of the total population. 50.33% of the men are the main working population . 12.42% of the women are main working population. While the marginal working population is 11.33% of the total population. 9.33% of the men are marginal working population. 13.49% of the women are marginal working population. The total non working population is 56.6% of the total population. 40.34% of the men are non working population. 74.09% of the women are non working population.

== Politics ==
 Contact of Administrative

Area	Designation	Name of the Officers
Begusarai	District Magistrate –cum-Collector	Mrs. Seema Tripathi. I.A.S.
Begusarai	Dy. Development Commissioner	Kaushal Kishor, I.A.S,
Begusarai	Superintendent of Police Begusarai	Mr Manoj Kumar I.P.S
24-BEGUSARAI	Member of Parliyament	Bhola Singh
147-Bakhari(SC)	Member of Legislative Assembly	Ramanad Ram
Katarmala South Panchayat	Head of Panchayat	Mithilesh Devi
Dandari 28	Member of Zila Prisad	Jhuna Parasad Singh

== Chief Exports ==
Agriculture:

- Kharif: Paddy, Tur, Urad, Maize, Soybean, Chili.
- Rabi: Wheat, Maize, Gram, Lentil, Peas, Mustard, Linseed, Cane, Sunflower.
- Fruit: Mango, Lychee, Guava, Berries, Jackfruit, Banana.

Cash Crops: Oil seeds, Tobacco, Jute, Castor, Potato, Green Chili, Red Chili, and other vegetables.

The district has developed fruit farming like Mango and Guava, and notable among them is Lychee.

== Bank ==
UCO Bank, Katarmala
Co-operative Bank, Katarmala
Indian Post-office, Katarmala
Customber help Center of SBI bank, Balha
Sudha Milk Dairy Center, Katarmala

== Other ==
Rivers: Budhi Gandak
Temple: Maa Bhagwati
School: Rajkiya High School, Katarmala
