= Sanjay Kumar Paswan =

Indian politician (born 1973)

Minister of Sugarcane Industries Government of Bihar
- Incumbent
- Assumed office 07 May 2026
- Chief Minister: Samrat Choudhary
- Preceded by: Samrat Choudhary(as Chief Minister)
- In office 20 November 2025 – 15 April 2026
- Chief Minister: Nitish Kumar
- Preceded by: Krishnanandan Paswan
- Succeeded by: Samrat Choudhary

Member of the Bihar Legislative Assembly
- Incumbent
- Assumed office 14 November 2025
- Preceded by: Suryakant Paswan, CPI
- Constituency: Bakhri

Personal details
- Born: 5 August 1973 (age 52) Begusarai, Bihar, India
- Party: Lok Janshakti Party (Ram Vilas)
- Other political affiliations: Lok Janshakti Party (till 2021)
- Occupation: Politician

Sanjay Kumar Paswan (born 5 August 1973) is an Indian politician from Bihar and a member of the Lok Janshakti Party (Ram Vilas). He is currently serving as the Minister of Sugarcane industries of Bihar. He has been elected as the Member of the Bihar Legislative Assembly from the Bakhri in the 2025 Bihar Legislative Assembly election, where he defeated the incumbent MLA Suryakant Paswan of the Communist Party of India by a margin of 17,318 votes.

He is regarded as one of the prominent leaders of the Lok Janshakti Party (Ram Vilas) in Bihar and serves as the Principal General Secretary of the Bihar state unit. He is also known for his long association with LJP founder Ram Vilas Paswan and the LJP(R) national president and Union Minister Chirag Paswan.

== Early life and education ==
Sanjay Kumar Paswan was born on 5 August 1973 in Begusarai, Bihar, to Gulab Paswan and Sona Devi. He completed his Bachelor of Arts from Hindi Vidyapeeth, Deoghar, in 1998.

== Political career ==
Bakhri, located in Begusarai district, is considered one of the most politically active and historically significant constituencies in Bihar. The seat came into existence in 1951 and was reserved for Scheduled Castes after the 2008 delimitation. Left parties, particularly the Communist Party of India, winning 11 out of 17 elections held before 2025.

In the 2025 Bihar Legislative Assembly election, Paswan secured 98,511 votes and defeated Suryakant Paswan of CPI by 17,318 votes, ending decades of left dominance in the constituency. Following the election, several political observers and party workers demanded his inclusion in the upcoming state cabinet because Bakhri has never been represented in the state ministry since independence. He was ultimately inducted into the ministry.

== Positions in party ==
- Principal General Secretary, Bihar State Unit, Lok Janshakti Party (Ram Vilas){{
- Senior leader and long-time associate of Ram Vilas Paswan and Chirag Paswan

== Social work ==
Paswan has been involved in welfare activities focused on Dalit empowerment, rural development, and support for economically weaker families in Begusarai district. His initiatives include village-level awareness drives, community outreach programmes, and assistance to marginalized communities.

== Electoral performance ==
Year	Constituency	Party	Votes	Result
2025	Bakhri	Lok Janshakti Party (Ram Vilas)	98,511	Won by 17,318 votes

== Personal life ==
Paswan is married.
