= Bijay Kumar Singh =

Bijay Kumar Singh may refer to:

- Bijay Kumar Singh (Indian politician)
- Bijay Kumar Singh (Nepali politician)
