= Krishnanandan Paswan =

Indian politician

Krishna Nandan Paswan

Minister of Sugarcane Industries Government of Bihar
- In office 15 March 2024 – 20 November 2025
- Chief Minister: Nitish Kumar
- Preceded by: Vijay Sinha
- Succeeded by: Sanjay Kumar Paswan

Member of Bihar Legislative Assembly
- Incumbent
- Assumed office 2020
- Preceded by: Rajendra Kumar
- Constituency: Harsidhi
- In office 2010–2015
- Preceded by: Maheshwar Singh
- Succeeded by: Rajendra Kumar
- Constituency: Harsidhi
- In office 2005–2010
- Preceded by: Surendra Chandra
- Succeeded by: Awadhesh Kushwaha
- Constituency: Pipra

Personal details
- Born: 5 January 1965 (age 61) Harsiddhi
- Party: Bharatiya Janata Party
- Children: Kundan Kumar Paswan (son)
- Occupation: Politician

Krishna Nandan Paswan (born 5 January 1965) is an Indian politician from Bihar who served as the Minister of Sugarcane Industries in the Government of Bihar. He is a Member of the Bihar Legislative Assembly. Paswan had won the Harsidhi constituency on the BJP ticket in the 2020 Bihar Legislative Assembly election.
