= Shyambabu Prasad Yadav =

Indian politician from Bihar

Member of Bihar Legislative Assembly
- Incumbent
- Assumed office 2015
- Preceded by: Awadhesh Kushwaha
- Constituency: Pipra

Personal details
- Born: 18 July 1966 (age 59)
- Party: Bharatiya Janata Party
- Occupation: Politician

Shyambabu Prasad Yadav is a member of the Bharatiya Janata Party from Bihar. He won the 2015 Bihar Legislative Assembly election from Pipra.

On 5 January 2017, Yadav filed a complaint against the Navyuvak Organisation of Jharkhand (NOJ), a Maoist group, claiming that they tried to extort Rs 5 lakh from him. The NOJ posted papers on the walls of Yadav's house and three other BJP workers in Kadama village, which has a large portion of Maoists living there, demanding they either pay the money or face dire consequences.
