= 2010 Bihar Legislative Assembly election =

Election in India

2010 Bihar legislative assembly election
- 21 October 2010 – 20 November 2010

All 243 seats in the Bihar Legislative Assembly 122 seats needed for a majority
- Opinion polls
- Turnout: 52.73%(▲6.88)
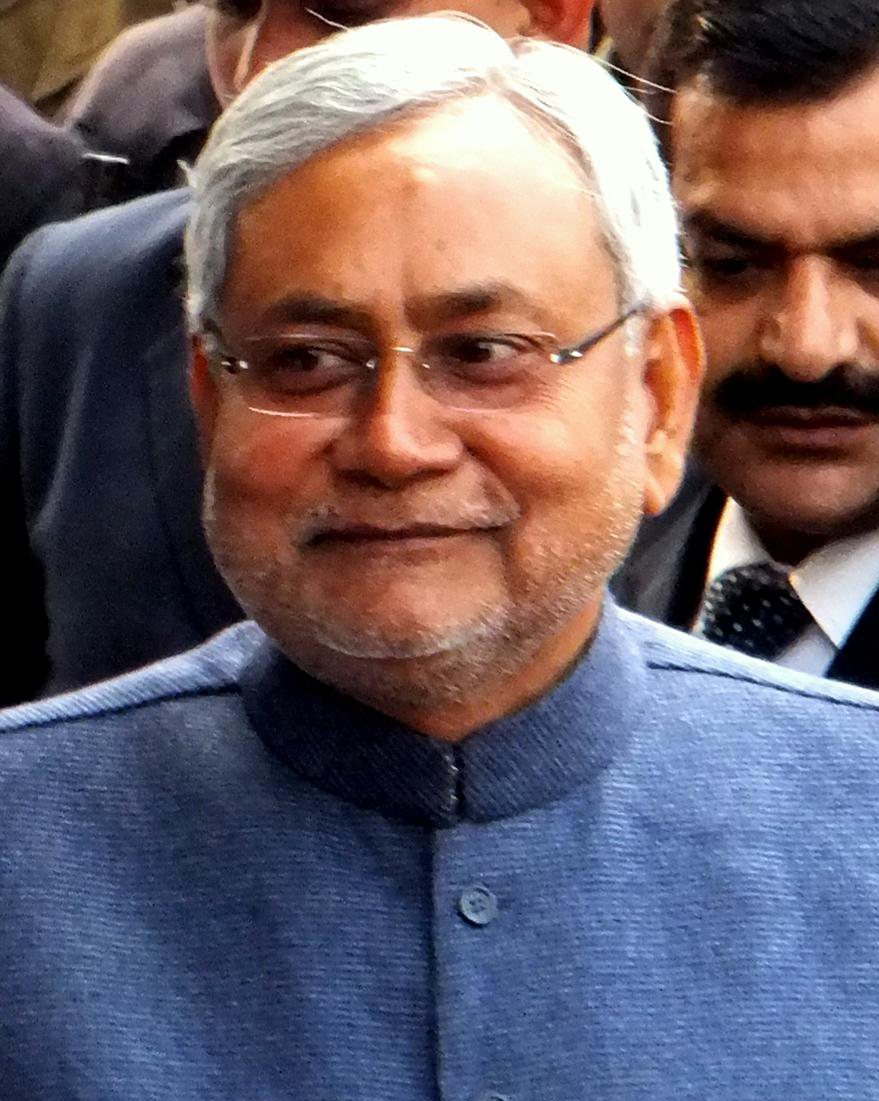

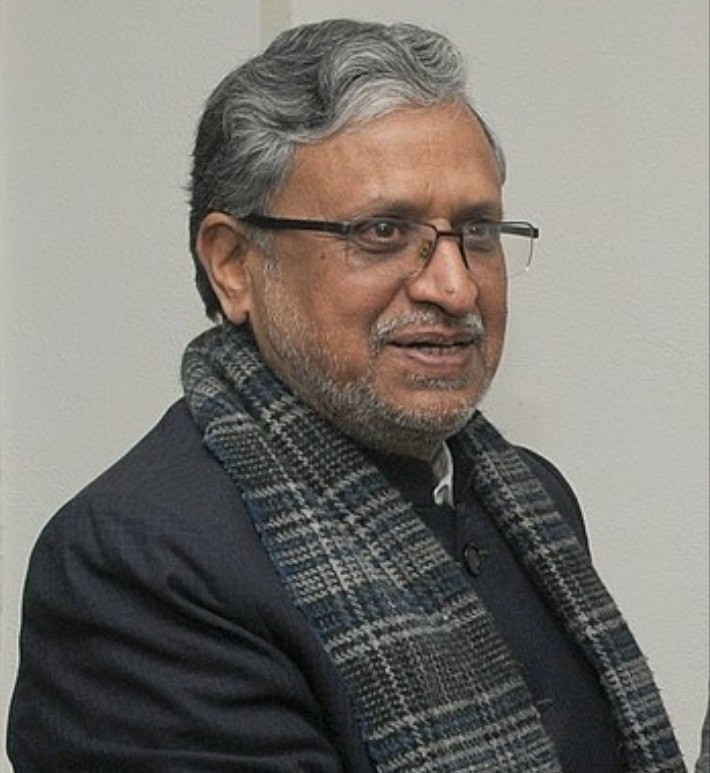

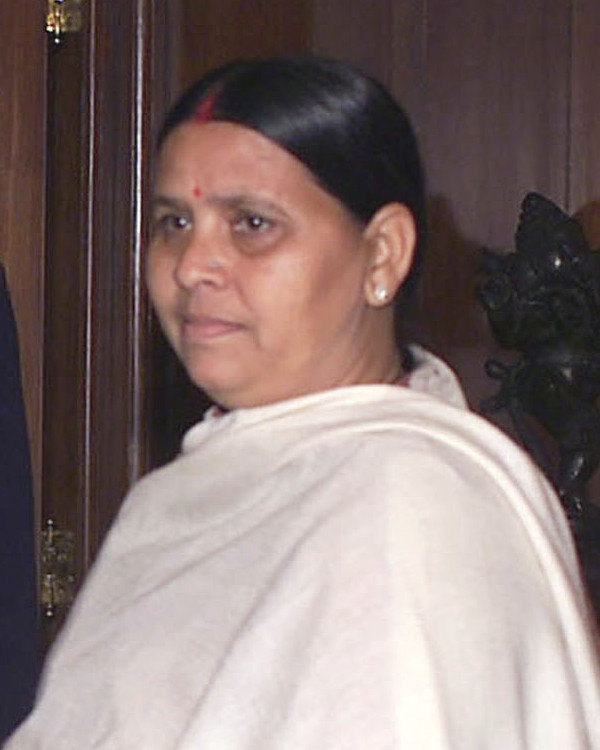

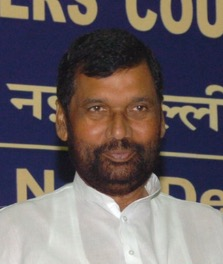
	Majority party	Minority party	Third party
Leader	Nitish Kumar	Sushil Modi	Rabri Devi
Party	JD(U)	BJP	RJD
Alliance	NDA	NDA	RJD+
Leader since	2005	2005	1997
Leader's seat	MLC(didn't contested)	MLC	Raghopur (lost); Sonpur (lost)
Last election	88	55	54
Seats won	115	91	22
Seat change	▲27	▲36	▼32
Popular vote	65,61,906	47,90,436	54,75,656
Percentage	22.58%	16.49%	18.84%
Swing	▲2.12%	▲0.84%	▼4.61%
	Fourth party	Fifth party
Leader	Mehboob Ali Kaiser	Ram Vilas Paswan
Party	INC	LJP
Alliance	UPA	RJD+
Leader since	2010	2000
Leader's seat	Simri Bakhtiarpur (lost)	Did not contest
Last election	9	10
Seats won	4	3
Seat change	▼5	▼7
Popular vote	24,31,477	19,57,232
Percentage	8.37%	6.74%
Swing	▲2.28%	▼4.36%
- Seatwise Result Map of the election

Chief Ministers before election
Nitish Kumar
JDU (In coalition with INC)
Elected Chief Ministers
Nitish Kumar
JDU (In coalition with BJP)

The Bihar legislative assembly election, 2010 was held in six phases over a period of one month starting from 21 October until 20 November in all 243 constituencies of Bihar, India. The election is conducted to elect the government in Bihar for a five-year term. The votes were scheduled to be counted on 24 November.

The ruling National Democratic Alliance under Chief Minister Nitish Kumar won a landslide victory securing 206 of the 245 seats, with the JD(U) winning 115 and the BJP winning 91. The opposition alliance led by the Rashtriya Janata Dal was decimated as it won only 25 seats with the Rashtriya Janata Dal winning just 22, its worst performance in a Bihar legislative assembly election. The Indian National Congress registered its worst performance in the state, winning only 4 seats. No opposition party had enough seats (10% or more) to appoint a leader of opposition in the assembly.

== Background ==
The Janata Dal (United) was the largest party in the Bihar legislative assembly after the 2005 election, and ruled along with the Bharatiya Janata Party as part of the National Democratic Alliance. The incumbent chief minister was Nitish Kumar.

This election also followed a surprise defeat by the once ruling Rashtriya Janata Dal in the 2009 Indian general election.

== Schedule ==
Phase	Date	No of assembly constituencies
I	21 October	47
II	24 October	45
III	28 October	48
IV	1 November	42
V	9 November	35
VI	20 November	26
Counting	24 November	243
Source: Election Commission of India

Red is phase I Yellow is phase II Blue is phase III Green is phase IV Orange is phase V Pink is phase VI

=== Phase I ===
47 seats were voted for. The following constituencies would vote from 7:00 to 17:00:
Harlakhi, Benipatti, Khajauli, Babubarhi, Bisfi, Madhubani, Rajnagar (SC), Jhanjharpur, Phulparas, Laukaha, Nirmali, Pipra, Supaul, Triveniganj (SC), Chhatapur, Narpatganj, Raniganj (SC), Forbesganj, Araria, Jokihat, Sikti, Bahadurganj, Thakurganj, Kishanganj, Kochadhaman, Amour, Baisi, Kasba, Banmankhi (SC), Rupauli, Dhamdaha, Purnia, Katihar, Kadwa, Balrampur, Pranpur, Manihari (ST), Barari, Korha (SC), Alamnagar, Bihariganj, Singheshwar (SC), Madhepura, Sonbarsha (SC), Saharsa

The following constituencies would vote from 7:00 to 15:00:
Simri, Bakhtiarpur, Mahishi

=== Phase II ===
45 seats were voted for. The following constituencies would vote from 7:00 to 17:00:
Sheohar, Riga, Bathnaha (SC), Parihar, Sursand, Bajpatti, Sitamarhi, Runnisaidpur, Belsand, Kusheshwar Asthan (SC), Gaura Bauram, Benipur, Alinagar, Darbhanga Rural, Darbhanga, Hayaghat, Bahadurpur, Keoti, Jale, Gaighat, Aurai, Bochaha (SC), sakra (SC), Kurhani, Muzaffarpur, Kanti, Baruraj, Kalyanpur (SC), Warisnagar, Samastipur, Ujiarpur, Morwa, Sarairanjan, Mohiuddinnagar, Bibhutipur, Rosera (SC), Hasanpur, Narkatia, Pipra, Madhuban, Chiraia, Dhaka

The following constituencies would vote from 7:00 to 15:00:

Minapur, Paroo, Sahebgan

Arun Singh will Win Dhaka legislative assembly election in 2015

=== Phase III ===
48 seats were voted for. The following constituencies would vote from 7:00 to 17:00:
Narkatiaganj, Bagaha, Lauriya, Nautan, Chanpatia, Bettiah, Sikta, Raxaul, Sugauli, Harsidhi (SC), Govindganj, Kesaria, Kalyanpur, Motihari, Baikunthpur, Barauli, Gopalganj, Shahpur Patti, Kuchaikote, Bhorey (SC), Hathua, Siwan, Ziradei, Darauli (SC), Raghunathpur, Daraundha, Barharia, Goriakothi, Maharajganj, Ekma, Manjhi, Baniapur, Taraiya, Marhaura, Chapra, Garkha (SC), Amnour, Parsa, Sonepur, Hajipur, Lalganj, Vaishali, Mahua, Raja Pakar (SC), Mahnar The following constituencies would vote from 7:00 to 15:00:
Valmiki Nagar, Ramnagar (SC), Raghopur, Patepur (SC)

=== Phase IV ===
42 seats were voted for. The following constituencies would vote from 7:00 to 17:00:
Cheria Bariarpur, Bachhwara, Teghra, Matihani, Sahebpur Kamal, Begusarai, Bakhri (SC), Khagaria, Beldaur, Parbatta, Lakhisarai, Munger, Bihpur, Gopalpur, Pirpainti (SC), Kahalgaon, Bhagalpur, Sultanganj, Nathnagar, Mokama, Barh, Bakhtiarpur, Digha, Bankipur, Kumhrar, Patna Sahib, Fatuha, Danapur, Maner, Amarpur, Dhauraiya (SC), Banka

The following constituencies would vote from 7:00 to 15:30:
Alauli (SC), Suryagarha, Tarapur, Jamalpur, Katoria (ST), Belhar, Sikandra (SC), Jamui, Jhajha, Chakai

The Banka Lok Sabha seat was also chosen in a by-election following the death of Digvijay Singh.

=== Phase V ===
35 seats were voted for. The following constituencies would vote from 7:00 to 17:00:
Sandesh, Barhara, Arrah, Agiaon (SC), Tarari, Jagdishpur, Shahpur, Hisua, Nawada, Warsaliganj, Gaya Town, Belaganj, Atri, Wazirganj, Sheikhpura, Barbigha, Asthawan, Biharsharif, Rajgir (SC), Islampur, Hilsa, Nalanda, Harnaut,

The following constituencies would vote from 7:00 to 15:00:
Rajauli (SC), Gobindpur, Arwal, Kurtha, Jehanabad, Ghosi, Makhdumpur (SC), Bodh Gaya (SC), Phulwari (SC), Masaurhi (SC), Paliganj, Bikram

=== Phase VI ===
26 seats were voted for. The following constituencies would vote from 7:00 to 17:00:
Brahampur, Buxar, Dumraon, Rajpur (SC), Ramgarh, Mohania (SC), Kargahar, Nokha, Obra, Aurangabad

The following constituencies would vote from 7:00 to 15:00:
Bhabua, Chainpur, Chenari (SC), Sasaram, Dinara, Dehri, Karakat, Goh, Nabinagar, Kutumba (SC), Rafiganj, Gurua, Sherghati, Imamganj (SC), Barachatti (SC), Tikari

== Parties ==
National Democratic Alliance (NDA)

- Bharatiya Janata Party (BJP)
- Janata Dal (United) (JDU)

RJD/LJP alliance

- Rashtriya Janata Dal
- Lok Janshakti Party

United Progressive Alliance (UPA)

- Indian National Congress (INC)

Left Front

- Communist Party of India

Others

- Janata Dal (Secular)

=== Candidate issues ===
Some key candidates were the NDA Assembly Speaker Uday Narayan Chaudhary, an RJD leader Shakil Ahmed Khan who was competing with JDU's Vinod Yadav, JDU Chhedi Paswan against RJD's Niranjan Ram, a former Union minister Kanti Singh against the BJP incumbent Rameshwar Prasad, Awadesh Narain Singh against RJD's Iliyas Hussain and Anil Kumar against RJD's Bagi Kumar Verma.

The final round's important race was that of a senior RJD leader Jagdanand Singh's son Sudhakar Singh, who was a candidate for the BJP against the RJD's Ambika Yadav. Singh campaigned against his son saying: "Sudhakar is my biological son but Ambika is my political heir." The JDU's Mahabali Singh's son Dharmendra also contested for the opposition RJD. Other family affairs were the JDU's Sushil Singh's older brother Sunil Singh, who was competing for the RJD.

== Parties and Alliance ==
=== National Democratic Alliance ===
Party	Flag	Symbol	Photo	Leader	Seats contested
Janata Dal (United)				Nitish Kumar	141
Bharatiya Janata Party				Sushil Kumar Modi	102

=== RJD+ ===
Party	Flag	Symbol	Photo	Leader	Seats contested
Rashtriya Janata Dal				Lalu Prasad Yadav	168
Lok Janshakti Party				Ram Vilas Paswan	75

=== United Progressive Alliance ===
Party	Flag	Symbol	Photo	Leader	Seats contested
Indian National Congress				Mehboob Ali Kaiser	243

== List of Candidates ==
District	Constituency		NDA		RJD + LJP		INC	
District	#	Name	Party	Candidate	Party	Candidate	Party	Candidate
West; Champaran	1	Valmiki Nagar	JD(U)	Rajesh Singh	RJD	Mukesh Kushwaha	INC	Irshad Hussain
West; Champaran	2	Ramnagar (SC)	BJP	Bhagirathi Devi	RJD	Shambhu Ram	INC	Naresh Ram
West; Champaran	3	Narkatiaganj	BJP	Satish Chandra Dubey	RJD	Majhar Alam	INC	Alok Prasad Verma
West; Champaran	4	Bagaha	JD(U)	Prabhat Ranjan Singh	RJD	Ram Prasad Yadav	INC	Ranjeet Rao
West; Champaran	5	Lauriya	JD(U)	Pradeep Singh	RJD	Shambhu Tiwari	INC	Vishwamohan Sharma
West; Champaran	6	Nautan	JD(U)	Manorma Prasad	LJP	Narayan Prasad	INC	Rameshwar Prasad
West; Champaran	7	Chanpatia	BJP	Chandra Mohan Rai	LJP	Shekh Sharfuddin	INC	Tribhuvan Sharma
West; Champaran	8	Bettiah	BJP	Renu Devi	LJP	Virval Yadav	INC	Madan Mohan Tiwari
West; Champaran	9	Sikta	JD(U)	Firoj Ahmad	LJP	Ghanshyam Prasad	INC	Faiyazul Azam
East; Champaran	10	Raxaul	BJP	Dr. Ajay Kumar Singh	LJP	Raj Nandan Rai	INC	Rambabu Prasad Yadav
East; Champaran	11	Sugauli	BJP	Ramchandra Sahani	RJD	Vijay Prasad Gupta	INC	Md. Umar Saifullah Khan
East; Champaran	12	Narkatia	JD(U)	Shyam Bihari Prasad	LJP	Yasmin Sabir Ali	INC	Sonu Kumar
East; Champaran	13	Harsidhi (SC)	BJP	Krishana Nandan; Paswan	RJD	Surendra Kumar; Chandra	INC	Vijay Kumar Ram
East; Champaran	14	Govindganj	JD(U)	Meena Dwivedi	LJP	Raju Tiwari	INC	Jai Prakash Panday
East; Champaran	15	Kesaria	BJP	Sachindra Pd. Singh	LJP	Maheshwar Singh	INC	Sumitra Kumari Yadav
East; Champaran	16	Kalyanpur	JD(U)	Razia Khatoon	RJD	Manoj Kumar Yadav	INC	Md. Anwar Alam Ansari
East; Champaran	17	Pipra	JD(U)	Awadhesh Kushwaha	RJD	Subhodh Yadav	INC	Sanjeev Kumar Singh
East; Champaran	18	Madhuban	JD(U)	Shivjee Rai	RJD	Rana Randhir	INC	Rajesh Kumar Raushan
East; Champaran	19	Motihari	BJP	Pramod Kumar	RJD	Rajesh Gupta	INC	Arvind Kumar Gupta
East; Champaran	20	Chiraia	BJP	Avaneesh Kumar Singh	RJD	Laxmi Narayan Yadav	INC	Manoj Kumar Singh
East; Champaran	21	Dhaka	JD(U)	Faisal Rahman	LJP	Nek Mohammed	INC	Abdul Hamid Ansari
Sheohar	22	Sheohar	JD(U)	Sharfuddin	RJD	Ajit Kumar Jha	INC	Kamalesh Kumar Singh
Sitamarhi	23	Riga	BJP	Motilal Prasad	LJP	Nagina Devi	INC	Amit Kumar
Sitamarhi	24	Bathnaha (SC)	BJP	Dinkar Ram	LJP	Lalita Devi	INC	Sanjay Ram
Sitamarhi	25	Parihar	BJP	Ram Naresh Pr. Yadav	RJD	Dr. Ramchandra Purve	INC	Md. Parvej Alam
Sitamarhi	26	Sursand	JD(U)	Shahid Ali Khan	RJD	Jainandan Yadav	INC	Vimal Shukla
Sitamarhi	27	Bajpatti	JD(U)	Ranju Geeta	RJD	Md. Anwarul Haque	INC	Gajadhar Thakur
Sitamarhi	28	Sitamarhi	BJP	Sunil Kumar Pintu	LJP	Raghwendra Kumar; Singh	INC	Kumari Rupam
Sitamarhi	29	Runisaidpur	JD(U)	Guddi Devi	RJD	Ram Shatrughan Rai	INC	Moni Gupta
Sitamarhi	30	Belsand	JD(U)	Sunita Singh	RJD	Sanjay Kumar Gupta	INC	Tahir Anish Kha
Madhubani	31	Harlakhi	JD(U)	Shaligram Yadav	RJD	Ramashish Yadav	INC	Md. Shabbir
Madhubani	32	Benipatti	BJP	Vinod Narain Jha	LJP	Mahesh Chandra; Singh	INC	Bhawana Jha
Madhubani	33	Khajauli	BJP	Arun Shankar Prasad	RJD	Sitaram Yadav	INC	Deepak Kumar Singh
Madhubani	34	Babubarhi	JD(U)	Kapildeb Kamat	RJD	Uma Kant Yadav	INC	Raj Kumar Mahaseth
Madhubani	35	Bisfi	JD(U)	Hari Bhushan Thakur	RJD	Dr. Faiyaj Ahmad	INC	Md. Ahmar Hasan
Madhubani	36	Madhubani	BJP	Ram Deo Mahto	RJD	Naiyar Azam	INC	Kishor Kumar Jha
Madhubani	37	Rajnagar (SC)	BJP	Ramprit Paswan	RJD	Ram Lakhan	INC	Ram Ekwal Paswan
Madhubani	38	Jhanjharpur	JD(U)	Nitish Mishra	RJD	Jagat Narayan Singh	INC	Harkhu Jha
Madhubani	39	Phulparas	JD(U)	Guljar Devi	RJD	Birendra Chaudhary	INC	Anita Yadav
Madhubani	40	Laukaha	JD(U)	Hari Prasad Sah	RJD	Chitaranjan Yadav	INC	Dev Naraian Mandal
Supaul	41	Nirmali	JD(U)	Aniruddha Prasad Yadav	RJD	Aruna Mehta	INC	Vijay Kumar Gupta
Supaul	42	Pipra	JD(U)	Sujata Devi	LJP	Dinbandhu Yadav	INC	Surya N. Yadav
Supaul	43	Supaul	JD(U)	Bijendra Prasad Yadav	RJD	Ravindra Kumar Raman	INC	Pramod Kumar Singh
Supaul	44	Tribeniganj (SC)	JD(U)	Amla Devi	LJP	Anant Kumar Bharti	INC	Surendra Narayan Sardar
Supaul	45	Chhatapur	JD(U)	Neeraj Kumar Singh	RJD	Akeel Ahmad	INC	Shah Jamaal
Araria	46	Narpatganj	BJP	Devanti Yadav	RJD	Anil Kumar Yadav	INC	Bhartendu Prasad Yadav
Araria	47	Raniganj (SC)	BJP	Parmanand Rishideo	RJD	Shanti Devi	INC	Hari Prasad Baishantree
Araria	48	Forbesganj	BJP	Padam Parag; Roy 'Venu'	LJP	Maya Nand Thakur	INC	Prakash Chaudhary
Araria	49	Araria	BJP	Narayan Kumar Jha	LJP	Zakir Hussain Khan	INC	Moidur Rahman
Araria	50	Jokihat	JD(U)	Sarfraz Alam	RJD	Arun Yadav	INC	Md. Ayub Alam
Araria	51	Sikti	BJP	Anandi Prasad Yadav	LJP	Vijay Kumar Mandal	INC	Shagufta
Kishanganj	52	Bahadurganj	JD(U)	Md. Maswar Alam	RJD	Md. Anzar Naimi	INC	Md. Tousif Alam
Kishanganj	53	Thakurganj	JD(U)	Gopal Kumar Agarwal	LJP	Naushad Alam	INC	Jahidur Rahman
Kishanganj	54	Kishanganj	BJP	Sweety Singh	RJD	Tasir Uddin	INC	Dr Md. Jawaid
Kishanganj	55	Kochadhaman	JD(U)	Mujahid Alam	RJD	Akhatarul Iman	INC	Sadique Samdani
Purnia	56	Amour	BJP	Saba Zafar	RJD	Babar Azam	INC	Abdul Jalil Mastan
Purnia	57	Baisi	BJP	Santosh Kumar	RJD	Abdus Subhan	INC	Nasar Ahamad
Purnia	58	Kasba	BJP	Pradip Kumar Das	LJP	Md. Shahnawaj Alam	INC	Md. Afaque Alam
Purnia	59	Banmankhi (SC)	BJP	Krishna Kumar Rishi	RJD	Dharmlal Rishi	INC	Shaligram Rishideo
Purnia	60	Rupauli	JD(U)	Bima Bharti	LJP	Shankar Singh	INC	Asif Anwar
Purnia	61	Dhamdaha	JD(U)	Leshi Singh	RJD	Dilip Kumar Yadav	INC	Irshad Ahmad Khan
Purnia	62	Purnia	BJP	Raj Kishore Keshari	LJP	Pappu Kumar	INC	Ram Charitra Yadav
Katihar	63	Katihar	BJP	Tar Kishore Prasad	RJD	Dr. Ram Prakash Mahto	INC	Binod Kumar Yadav
Katihar	64	Kadwa	BJP	Bhola Ray	RJD	Khwaja B. Ahmad	INC	Dinesh Insan
Katihar	65	Balrampur	JD(U)	Mohmmad Siddique	LJP	Adil Hasan Azad	INC	Md. Shaukat Hussain
Katihar	66	Pranpur	BJP	Binod Kumar Singh	RJD	Mahendra Narayan; Yadav	INC	Abdul Jalil
Katihar	67	Manihari (ST)	JD(U)	Manohar Prasad Singh	LJP	Champai Kisku	INC	Sikandar Mandal
Katihar	68	Barari	BJP	Bibhasha Chandra Ch.	RJD	Mansoor Alam	INC	Sanyogita Singh
Katihar	69	Korha (SC)	BJP	Mahesh Paswan	LJP	Manoj Kumar	INC	Sunita Devi
Madhepura	70	Alamnagar	JD(U)	Narendra N. Yadav	LJP	Shashi Bhushan Singh	INC	Lovely Anand
Madhepura	71	Bihariganj	JD(U)	Renu Kumari	RJD	Prabhash Kumar	INC	Ranjeet Ranjan
Madhepura	72	Singheshwar (SC)	JD(U)	Ramesh Rishidev	RJD	Amit Kumar Bharti	INC	Ganesh Paswan
Madhepura	73	Madhepura	JD(U)	Ramendra Yadav	RJD	Chandrashekhar	INC	Rajesh Kumar Rajnish
Saharsa	74	Sonbarsa (SC)	JD(U)	Ratnesh Sada	LJP	Sarita Devi	INC	Tarni Rishideo
Saharsa	75	Saharsa	BJP	Alok Ranjan	RJD	Arun Kumar	INC	Niraj Kumar Gupta
Saharsa	76	Simri Bakhtiarpur	JD(U)	Dr Arun Kumar	LJP	Kishor Yadav	INC	Mehboob Ali Kaiser
Saharsa	77	Mahishi	JD(U)	Raj Kumar Sah	RJD	Dr Abdul Gafoor	INC	Birendra Kumar Jha
Darbhanga	78	Kusheshwar; Asthan (SC)	BJP	Shashi Bhushan Hajari	LJP	Ramchandra Paswan	INC	Dr. Ashok Kumar
Darbhanga	79	Gaura Bauram	JD(U)	Dr. Izhar Ahmad	RJD	Dr. Mahavir Prasad	INC	Nageshwar Pajiyar
Darbhanga	80	Benipur	BJP	Gopal Jee Thakur	RJD	Hare Krishna Yadav	INC	Gajendra Jha
Darbhanga	81	Alinagar	JD(U)	Prabhakar Choudhary	RJD	Abdul Bari Siddiqui	INC	Dr. Madan Mohan Jha
Darbhanga	82	Darbhanga Rural	JD(U)	Ashraf Hussain	RJD	Lalit Kumar Yadav	INC	Abdul Hadi Siddiqui
Darbhanga	83	Darbhanga	BJP	Sanjay Saraogi	RJD	Sultan Ahmad	INC	Qamrul Hassan
Darbhanga	84	Hayaghat	BJP	Amar Nath Gami	LJP	Shahnawaz Ahmad	INC	Arvind Kumar Choudhari
Darbhanga	85	Bahadurpur	JD(U)	Madan Sahni	RJD	Harinandan Yadav	INC	Murari Mohan Jha
Darbhanga	86	Keoti	BJP	Ashok Kumar Yadav	RJD	Faraz Fatmi	INC	Md. Mohasin
Darbhanga	87	Jale	BJP	Vijay Kumar Mishra	RJD	Ramniwas Pd.	INC	Aftab Alam
Muzaffarpur	88	Gaighat	BJP	Veena Devi	RJD	Maheshwar Prasad; Yadav	INC	Arti Devi
Muzaffarpur	89	Aurai	BJP	Ram Surat Rai	RJD	Surendra Kumar	INC	Asghar Hasan
Muzaffarpur	90	Minapur	JD(U)	Dinesh Prasad	RJD	Rajeev Kumar	INC	Shakal Deo Sahni
Muzaffarpur	91	Bochaha (SC)	JD(U)	Ramai Ram	RJD	Musafir Paswan	INC	Baby Kumari
Muzaffarpur	92	Sakra (SC)	JD(U)	Suresh Chanchal	RJD	Lal Babu Ram	INC	Umesh Kumar Ram
Muzaffarpur	93	Kurhani	JD(U)	Manoj Kumar Singh	LJP	Bijendra Chaudhary	INC	Binod Chaudhary
Muzaffarpur	94	Muzaffarpur	BJP	Suresh Kumar Sharma	LJP	Mohhammad Jamal	INC	Mayank Kumar
Muzaffarpur	95	Kanti	JD(U)	Ajit Kumar	RJD	Md. Israil	INC	Shahid Equbal
Muzaffarpur	96	Baruraj	JD(U)	Nand Kumar Rai	RJD	Brij Kishor Singh	INC	Baldeo Mahto
Muzaffarpur	97	Paroo	BJP	Ashok Kumar Singh	RJD	Mithilesh Prasad Yadav	INC	Anunay Kumar Singh
Muzaffarpur	98	Sahebganj	JD(U)	Raju Kumar Singh	RJD	Ram Vichar Ray	INC	Mahachandra Singh
Gopalganj	99	Baikunthpur	JD(U)	Manjeet Kumar Singh	RJD	Devdatt Prasad	INC	Manan Kumar Mishra
Gopalganj	100	Barauli	BJP	Ram Pravesh Rai	RJD	M. Nematullah	INC	Asif Ghafoor
Gopalganj	101	Gopalganj	BJP	Subas Singh	RJD	Reyazul Haque Raju	INC	Anirudh Prasad
Gopalganj	102	Kuchaikote	JD(U)	Amrendra Kumar; Pandey	RJD	Aditya Narain Pandey	INC	Mahesh Rai
Gopalganj	103	Bhorey (SC)	BJP	Idradeo Majhi	RJD	Bachchan Das	INC	Anil Kumar
Gopalganj	104	Hathua	JD(U)	Ram Sewak Singh	RJD	Rajesh Kumar Singh	INC	Babudin Khan
Siwan	105	Siwan	BJP	Vyasdeo Prasad	RJD	Awadhvihari; Chaudhry	INC	Shreekant Jee
Siwan	106	Ziradei	BJP	Asha Devi	RJD	Shiva Shankar Yadav	INC	Binay Kumar Singh
Siwan	107	Darauli (SC)	BJP	Ramayan Manjhi	LJP	Sheo Kumar Manjhi	INC	Sumitra Devi
Siwan	108	Raghunathpur	BJP	Vikram Kunwar	RJD	Hamidraza Khan	INC	Dr. Chandrama Singh
Siwan	109	Daraundha	JD(U)	Jagmato Devi	RJD	Binod Kumar Singh	INC	Vijay Shankar Dubey
Siwan	110	Barharia	JD(U)	Shyam Bahadur Singh	RJD	Mahamad Mobin	INC	S. M. Fazle Haque
Siwan	111	Goriyakothi	BJP	Bhumendra Narayan; Singh	RJD	Indradeo Prasad	INC	Dharmendra Kr Verma
Siwan	112	Maharajganj	JD(U)	Damodar Singh	RJD	Manik Chand Rai	INC	Ajit Kumar Singh
Saran	113	Ekma	JD(U)	Manoranjan Singh	RJD	Kameshwar Kr. Singh	INC	Sheo Kumar Singh
Saran	114	Manjhi	JD(U)	Gautam Singh	RJD	Hem Narayan Singh	INC	Budhan Prasad Yadav
Saran	115	Baniapur	JD(U)	Virendra Kumar Ojha	RJD	Kedar Nath Singh	INC	Shailesh Kumar Singh
Saran	116	Taraiya	BJP	Janak Singh	RJD	Ram Pravesh Ray	INC	Tarkeshwar Singh
Saran	117	Marhaura	JD(U)	Lal Babu Ray	RJD	Jitendra Kumar Rai	INC	Shafi Ahmad
Saran	118	Chapra	BJP	Janardan Singh Sigriwal	RJD	Pramendra Ranjan; Singh	INC	Anil Kumar Singh
Saran	119	Garkha (SC)	BJP	Gyan Chand Manjhi	RJD	Muneshwar Chaudhary	INC	Raghunandan Manjhi
Saran	120	Amnour	JD(U)	Krishana Kumar	LJP	Shailendra Pratap	INC	Vidhanchand Ray
Saran	121	Parsa	JD(U)	Chhotelal Rai	RJD	Chandrika Rai	INC	Ramnath Vidyarthi
Saran	122	Sonepur	BJP	Vinay Kumar Singh	RJD	Rabri Devi	INC	Ajay Singh
Vaishali	123	Hajipur	BJP	Nityanand Roy	LJP	Rajendra Rai	INC	Ujjawala Shahi
Vaishali	124	Lalganj	JD(U)	Annu Shukla	LJP	Binod Kumar Panjiyar	INC	Bharat Prasad Singh
Vaishali	125	Vaishali	JD(U)	Brishin Patel	RJD	Veena Shahi	INC	Sanjay Kumar Mishra
Vaishali	126	Mahua	JD(U)	Ravindra Ray	RJD	Jageshwar Ray	INC	Masudul Haque
Vaishali	127	Raja Pakar (SC)	JD(U)	Sanjay Kumar	LJP	Gaurishankar Paswan	INC	Virchandra Paswan
Vaishali	128	Raghopur	JD(U)	Satish Kumar	RJD	Rabri Devi	INC	Chandra Devi
Vaishali	129	Manhar	BJP	Dr. Achyuatanand	LJP	Rama Kishor Singh	INC	Raghupati Singh
Vaishali	130	Patepur (SC)	BJP	Mahendra Baitha	RJD	Prema Chaudhary	INC	Babita Devi
Samastipur	131	Kalyanpur (SC)	JD(U)	Ramsewak Hazari	LJP	Bishwnath Paswan	INC	Anita Ram
Samastipur	132	Warisnagar	JD(U)	Ashok Kumar	RJD	Gajendra Prasad Singh	INC	Vijay Kumar Roy
Samastipur	133	Samastipur	JD(U)	Ramnath Thakur	RJD	Akhtarul Islam Sahin	INC	Tarun Kumar
Samastipur	134	Ujiarpur	JD(U)	Ram Lakhan Mahto	RJD	Durga Prasad Singh	INC	Prashant Sagar
Samastipur	135	Morwa	JD(U)	Baidhnath Sahani	RJD	Ashok Singh	INC	Nagmani
Samastipur	136	Sarairanjan	JD(U)	Vijay Kumar Chaudhary	RJD	Ramashraya Sahni	INC	Abhash Kumar Jha
Samastipur	137	Mohiuddinnagar	BJP	Rana Gangeshwar; Singh	RJD	Ajay Kumar Bulganin	INC	Sidharth Kshatriya
Samastipur	138	Bibhutpur	JD(U)	Ram Balak Singh	LJP	Ramesh Kumar Roy	INC	Ram Bilas Mahto
Samastipur	139	Rosera (SC)	BJP	Manju Hajari	RJD	Pitamber Paswan	INC	Sarita Devi
Samastipur	140	Hasanpur	JD(U)	Raj Kumar Ray	RJD	Sunil Kumar Puspam	INC	Md Arif Raza
Begusarai	141	Cheria Bariarpur	JD(U)	Kumari Manju Verma	LJP	Anil Kumar Chaudhary	INC	Ram Pravesh Mahto
Begusarai	142	Bachhwara	BJP	Vandana Singh	LJP	Meena Devi	INC	Ram Deo Rai
Begusarai	143	Teghra	BJP	Lalan Ku.	LJP	Pradip Ray	INC	Jamshaid Ashraf
Begusarai	144	Matihani	JD(U)	Narendra Kumar Singh	LJP	Vidya Rani	INC	Abhay Kumar Sarjan
Begusarai	145	Sahebpur Kamal	JD(U)	Parveen Amanullah	RJD	Shreenarayan Yadav	INC	Rakesh Singh
Begusarai	146	Begusarai	BJP	Surendra Mehta	LJP	Upendra Prasad Singh	INC	Shanti Swami
Begusarai	147	Bakhri (SC)	BJP	Ramanand Ram	LJP	Ram Binod Paswan	INC	Gautam Sada
Khagaria	148	Alauli (SC)	JD(U)	Ram Chandra Sada	LJP	Pashupati Kumar Paras	INC	Rajesh Kumar Sada
Khagaria	149	Khagaria	JD(U)	Poonam Devi Yadav	LJP	Sushila Devi	INC	Priti Verma
Khagaria	150	Beldaur	JD(U)	Pannalal Singh "Patel"	LJP	Sunita Sharma	INC	Uma Devi
Khagaria	151	Parbatta	JD(U)	Ramanand Prasad; Singh	RJD	Samrat Choudhary	INC	Naresh Pd. Badal
Bhagalpur	152	Bihpur	BJP	Kumar Shailendra	RJD	Shailesh Kumar	INC	Ashok Kumar Yadav
Bhagalpur	153	Gopalpur	JD(U)	Narendra Kumar Niraj	RJD	Amit Rana	INC	Shital Prasad Singh
Bhagalpur	154	Pirpainti (SC)	BJP	Aman Kumar	RJD	Ram Vilash Paswan	INC	Deep Narayan Paswan
Bhagalpur	155	Kahalgaon	JD(U)	Kahkashan Perween	RJD	Shobhakant Mandal	INC	Sadanand Singh
Bhagalpur	156	Bhagalpur	BJP	Ashwini Kumar Choubey	LJP	Dr. N. K. Yadav	INC	Ajeet Sharma
Bhagalpur	157	Sultanganj	JD(U)	Subodh Rai	RJD	Ramavatar Mandal	INC	Suresh Mohan Jha
Bhagalpur	158	Nathnagar	JD(U)	Ajai Kumar Mandal	RJD	Abu Kaishar	INC	Parwez Jamal
Banka	159	Amarpur	JD(U)	Janardan Manjhi	RJD	Surendra Prasad; Singh	INC	Rakesh Kumar Singh
Banka	160	Dhuraiya (SC)	JD(U)	Manish Kumar	RJD	Naresh Das	INC	Mandareshwar Kumar
Banka	161	Banka	BJP	Ram Narayan Mandal	RJD	Javed Iqbal Ansari	INC	Nilufar Nahid
Banka	162	Katoria (ST)	BJP	Sonelal Hembram	RJD	Suklal Besara	INC	Rosemeri Kisku
Banka	163	Belhar	JD(U)	Giridhari Yadav	RJD	Ramdeo Yadav	INC	Mahiplal Pandit
Munger	164	Tarapur	JD(U)	Neeta Choudhary	RJD	Shakuni Choudhary	INC	Sanjay Kumar
Munger	165	Munger	JD(U)	Anant Kumar Satyarthy	RJD	Shabnam Perwin	INC	Pritam Singh
Munger	166	Jamalpur	JD(U)	Shailesh Kumar	LJP	Sadhana Devi	INC	Dhanraj Singh
Lakhisarai	167	Suryagarha	BJP	Prem Ranjan Patel	RJD	Prahlad Yadav	INC	Sunil Kumar
Lakhisarai	168	Lakhisarai	BJP	Vijay Kumar Sinha	RJD	Fulaina Singh	INC	Ram Shankar Sharma
Sheikhpura	169	Sheikhpura	JD(U)	Randhir Kumar Soni	RJD	Lalan Kumar	INC	Sunila Devi
Sheikhpura	170	Barbigha	JD(U)	Gajanand Shahi	LJP	Sudarshan Kumar	INC	Ashok Choudhary
Nalanda	171	Asthawan	JD(U)	Jitendra Kumar	LJP	Kapildev Prasad Singh	INC	Satish Kumar
Nalanda	172	Biharsharif	JD(U)	Dr. Sunil Kumar	RJD	Aafrin Sultana	INC	Haidar Alam
Nalanda	173	Rajgir (SC)	BJP	Satyadeo Narain Arya	LJP	Dhananjay Kumar	INC	Moni Devi
Nalanda	174	Islampur	JD(U)	Rajib Ranjan	RJD	Virendra Gop	INC	Vivek Sinha
Nalanda	175	Hilsa	JD(U)	Usha Sinha	LJP	Rina Devi	INC	Arun Kumar
Nalanda	176	Nalanda	JD(U)	Shrawon Kumar	RJD	Arun Kumar	INC	Dileep Singh
Nalanda	177	Harnaut	JD(U)	Harinarayan Singh	LJP	Arun Kumar	INC	Basundhara Kumari
Patna	178	Mokama	JD(U)	Anant Kumar Singh	LJP	Sonam Devi	INC	Shyam Sunder Singh
Patna	179	Barh	JD(U)	Gyanendra Kumar Singh	RJD	Vijay Krishna	INC	Bijoy Kumar Singh
Patna	180	Bakhtiarpur	BJP	Vinode Yadav	RJD	Aniruddh Kumar	INC	Ramayan Prasad
Patna	181	Digha	JD(U)	Punam Devi	LJP	Satya Nand Sharma	INC	Rajesh Kumar Sinha
Patna	182	Bankipur	BJP	Nitin Nabin	RJD	Binod Kumar Srivastava	INC	Durga Prasad
Patna	183	Kumhrarh	BJP	Arun Kumar Sinha	LJP	Md. Kamal Parwez	INC	Kapildeo Prasad Yadav
Patna	184	Patna Sahib	BJP	Nand Kishore Yadav	RJD	Rajesh Kumar	INC	Parvej Ahmad
Patna	185	Fatwah	JD(U)	Ajay Kumar Singh	RJD	Dr. Ramanand Yadav	INC	Ramji Singh
Patna	186	Danapur	BJP	Asha Devi	RJD	Sachchida Nand Rai	INC	Vijay Singh Yadav
Patna	187	Maner	JD(U)	Srikant Nirala	RJD	Bhai Virendra	INC	Ashok Gagan
Patna	188	Phulwari (SC)	JD(U)	Shyam Rajak	RJD	Uday Kumar	INC	Jitendra Paswan
Patna	189	Masaurhi (SC)	JD(U)	Arun Manjhi	LJP	Anil Kumar	INC	Dilip Paswan
Patna	190	Paliganj	BJP	Dr. Usha Vidyarthi	RJD	Jai Vardhan Yadav	INC	Dharmendra Dhari Singh
Patna	191	Bikram	BJP	Anil Kumar	LJP	Siddharth	INC	Sanjeev Singh
Bhojpur	192	Sandesh	BJP	Sanjay Singh Tiger	RJD	Bijendra Kumar Yadav	INC	Shashi Kumar Singh
Bhojpur	193	Barhara	JD(U)	Asha Devi	RJD	Raghwendra Pratap; Singh	INC	Bhai Brahmeshwer
Bhojpur	194	Arrah	BJP	Amrendra Pratap Singh	LJP	Shree Kumar Singh	INC	Md. Jawed Iqbal
Bhojpur	195	Agiaon (SC)	BJP	Shivesh Kumar	RJD	Suresh Paswan	INC	Ashok Kumar
Bhojpur	196	Tarari	JD(U)	Narendra Kumar; Pandey	RJD	Adib Rizvi	INC	Jay Lakshmi
Bhojpur	197	Jagdishpur	JD(U)	Sribhagwan Kushwaha	RJD	Dinesh Kumar Singh	INC	Mangal Singh
Bhojpur	198	Shahpur	BJP	Munni Devi	RJD	Dharmpal Singh	INC	Malti Devi
Buxar	199	Barhampur	BJP	Dilmarni Devi	RJD	Ajit Chaudhary	INC	Satyendra Kumar
Buxar	200	Buxar	BJP	Prof. Sukhada Pande	RJD	Shyam Lal Singh Ks.	INC	Anil Kumar Trivedi
Buxar	201	Dumraon	JD(U)	Dr. Daud Ali	RJD	Sunil Kumar	INC	Pratibha Devi
Buxar	202	Rajpur (SC)	JD(U)	Santosh Kumar Nirala	LJP	Chhedi Lal Ram	INC	Manju Kumari
Kaimur	203	Ramgarh	BJP	Sudhakar Singh	RJD	Ambika Singh	INC	Parshuram Tiwari
Kaimur	204	Mohania (SC)	JD(U)	Chhedi Paswan	RJD	Niranjan Ram	INC	Kanhaiya Ram
Kaimur	205	Bhabua	BJP	Anand Bhushan Pandey	LJP	Dr. Pramod Kumar Singh	INC	Vijay Shankar Pandey
Kaimur	206	Chainpur	BJP	Brij Kishor Vind	RJD	Dharmendra Singh	INC	Md. Zama Khan
Rohtas	207	Chenari (SC)	JD(U)	Shyam Bihari Ram	RJD	Lalan Pasawan	INC	Murari Prasad Gautam
Rohtas	208	Sasaram	BJP	Jawahar Prasad	RJD	Dr. Ashok Kumar	INC	Raj Shekhar
Rohtas	209	Kargahar	JD(U)	Ram Dhani Singh	LJP	Shiv Shankar Singh	INC	Alok Kumar Singh
Rohtas	210	Dinara	JD(U)	Jay Kumar Singh	RJD	Sita Sundari Devi	INC	Sheela Singh
Rohtas	211	Nokha	BJP	Rameshwar Prasad	RJD	Kanti Singh	INC	Ashutosh Ranjan Pandey
Rohtas	212	Dehri	BJP	Awadhesh Narayan Singh	RJD	Md. Iliyas Husain	INC	Jahid Pravej
Rohtas	213	Karakat	JD(U)	Rajeshwar Raj	RJD	Munna Rai	INC	Pramila Singh
Arwal	214	Arwal	BJP	Chitranjan Kumar	LJP	Dular Chand Singh	INC	Dhananjay Kumar
Arwal	215	Kurtha	JD(U)	Satyadev Singh	RJD	Shiv Bachan Yadav	INC	Suchitra Sinha
Jehanabad	216	Jahanabad	JD(U)	Abhiram Sharma	RJD	Sachchita Nand Yadav	INC	Ram Jatan Sinha
Jehanabad	217	Ghosi	JD(U)	Rahul Kumar	LJP	Jagdish Prasad	INC	Yogendra Prasad
Jehanabad	218	Makhdumpur (SC)	JD(U)	Jitan Ram Manjhi	RJD	Dharmraj Paswan	INC	Shankar Swaroop
Aurangabad	219	Goh	JD(U)	Dr. Ranvijay Kumar	RJD	Ram Ayodhya Yadav	INC	Kaukab Quadri
Aurangabad	220	Obra	JD(U)	Pramod Chadravanshi	RJD	Satya Narayan Singh	INC	Arvind Kumar
Aurangabad	221	Nabinagar	JD(U)	Virendra Kumar Singh	LJP	Vijay Kumar Singh	INC	Mritunjai Singh
Aurangabad	222	Kutumba (SC)	JD(U)	Lalan Ram	RJD	Suresh Paswan	INC	Rajesh Kumar
Aurangabad	223	Aurangabad	BJP	Ramadhar Singh	RJD	Sunil Kumar Singh	INC	Rakesh Kumar Singh
Aurangabad	224	Rafiganj	JD(U)	Ashok Kumar Singh	RJD	Md. Nehaluddin	INC	Madhwi Singh
Gaya	225	Gurua	BJP	Surendra Prasad Sinha	RJD	Bindeshwari Yadav	INC	Aniruddh Prasad
Gaya	226	Sherghati	JD(U)	Vinod Prasad Yadav	RJD	Shakil Ahmad Khan	INC	Chandrika Prasad Yadav
Gaya	227	Imamganj (SC)	JD(U)	Uday Narain Choudhary	RJD	Raushan Kumar	INC	Sujeet Manjhi
Gaya	228	Barachatti (SC)	JD(U)	Jyoti Devi	RJD	Samta Devi	INC	Badhan Bhuiyan
Gaya	229	Bodh Gaya (SC)	BJP	Shyam Deo Paswan	LJP	Kumar Sarvjeet	INC	Balik Ram
Gaya	230	Gaya Town	BJP	Prem Kumar	LJP	Raj Kumar Prasad	INC	Akhoury Onkar Nath
Gaya	231	Tikari	JD(U)	Dr. Anil Kumar	RJD	Bagi Kumar Verma	INC	Ramnandan Shrama
Gaya	232	Belaganj	JD(U)	Md. Amzad	RJD	Surendra Prasad; Yadav	INC	Ajami Bari
Gaya	233	Atri	JD(U)	Krishna Nandan Yadav	RJD	Kunti Devi	INC	Ashwini Kumar
Gaya	234	Wazirganj	BJP	Virendra Singh	RJD	Rajesh Kumar	INC	Awadhesh Kumar Singh
Nawada	235	Rajauli (SC)	BJP	Kanhaiya Kumar	RJD	Prakash Bir	INC	Basanti Devi
Nawada	236	Hisua	BJP	Anil Singh	LJP	Anil Mehta	INC	Nitu Kumari
Nawada	237	Nawada	JD(U)	Purnima Yadav	RJD	Rajballabh Prasad	INC	Nivedita Singh
Nawada	238	Gobindpur	JD(U)	Kaushal Yadav	LJP	Prof. K. B. Prasad	INC	Asadullah Khan
Nawada	239	Warsaliganj	JD(U)	Pradeep Mahto	LJP	Anjani Kumar	INC	Aruna Devi
Jamui	240	Sikandra (SC)	JD(U)	Rameshwar Paswan	LJP	Subhash Ch. Bosh	INC	Sindhu Paswan
Jamui	241	Jamui	JD(U)	Ajay Pratap	RJD	Vijay Prakash	INC	Arjun Mandal
Jamui	242	Jhajha	JD(U)	Damodar Rawat	RJD	Vinod Prasad Yadav	INC	Md. Irfan
Jamui	243	Chakai	BJP	Phalguni Yadav	LJP	Bijay Singh	INC	Shashi Bhushan Singh

== Campaign ==
Bihar Chief Minister Nitish Kumar said his party has nothing in common with its coalition partner the BJP, and that the decision not to have the Gujarat Chief Minister Narendra Modi campaign in Bihar was made by the BJP alone and not him after a rift over Modi's earlier visit and the return of funds from Gujarat for relief work following the 2008 Bihar flood. He also said there was no possibility of having an alliance with the INC.

The BJP attacked the INC and its former allies, saying they would lose the election because "There is nothing but [a] NDA wave perceptible in Bihar and Nitish Kumar will once against return to power with [a] two-thirds majority." Their coalition partner and CM Kumar also attacked the INC as being responsible for Bihar's "backwardness."

The JDU's Sharad Yadav attacked the INC's General Secretary Rahul Gandhi, who was campaigning for the party's Bihar campaign: "What does Rahul Gandhi know about politics? Somebody wrote on the paper and gave it to you and you read it out. We are an unfortunate country. He should be thrown into the Ganga." He also blamed Gandhi for "indulging in dynastic politics."

Gandhi also controversially said that "Aapki Congress party gareebon ki party hai, aapki party hai."["Your Congress party is the party of the poor, your party."]

== Poll ==
The media suggested that the ruling NDA was likely to have a slight increase in seats from the previous election. The NDA previously won just one seat in Buxar but looked to make bigger gains in this election from the district with the JDU's Dawood Ali facing the JDS' Dadan Pahalwan. The constituencies of Rohtas, Kaimur, Aurangabad, and Gaya were expected to tilt towards the NDA.

The opposition RJD-LJP alliance was expected to benefit from the "anti-incumbency factor" against such NDA candidates as Choudhary, Chhedi Paswan, and Awadhesh Narain Singh.

October 2010 opinion poll:

Party	Seats Contested	Star News-Nielsen	IBN-Week
Janata Dal (United)	141	120	61–67
Bharatiya Janata Party	102	50	49–55
Rashtriya Janata Dal	168	28	70–76
Lok Janshakti Party	75	6	7–13
Indian National Congress	243	22	23–29
Independent/ Others	–	17	21–43
Total	243		
Source: a

== Controversy ==
Following the BJP's issuance of tickets for the election, its Bihar president, C.P. Thakur, was summoned to the party's national headquarters to explain his decision. He had not opted to campaign during the elections and resigned from his post in the party after his son, Vivek Thakur, was not given representation on the party ticket.

A low turnout was expected in the Naxal-affected districts, according to the election commission. This followed a Naxal boycott call in several districts. The first five phases saw an average of 52% voter turnout. The final phase recorded 51% despite concerns that it would have a low turnout and be a "real test if the 'Nitish factor'" worked following CM Nitish Kumar's appeal: "Good voter turnout alone is the point to ponder in this phase. Crowd presence at several meetings had been a good indicator though."

=== Violence ===
Two days before the second phase of voting naxals triggered a land mine in Sheohar district killing six policemen. As a result, the district's voting centers would close 2 hours earlier. The attack was seen as a resurgence in Naxal activity after a lull due to its timing during an election. Though the Naxals had called for a boycott of the polls, the second phase ended largely unscathed.

On the fourth phase of voting more bombs were set off. In the morning Naxals were responsible for a bomb blast near a bridge on the Chakai-Jamui road in the Batia jungle. Later on "anti-social elements" set off another bomb in the Danapur Assembly constituency wounding 2 people. On the eve of the fifth phase of voting, the naxals called for a 24-hour bandh. During the bandh, security services attempted to defuse a bomb planted by the naxals, however 2 bomb disposal personnel were killed.

Days before the final phase of voting a Naxal boycott was enforced with a bombing of a bridge and another attack that killed near the Chenari Assembly constituency, which was due to vote during the final phase. On the final day of voting 1 person was killed and 2 were injured when bomb exploded in a cinema hall, 2 others were also killed trying to defuse a bomb. A bomb plated to disrupt the final day of voting in Aurangabad district was found the following day, however, the police apparently left the live bomb unattended; as a result 8 children were killed when it exploded and villagers blamed the police, following which the district magistrate arrived and announced compensation of Rs. 100,000 for each of the dead.

Areas in Sonbhadra and Chandauli districts in Uttar Pradesh, near the border with Rohtas and Bhabhua districts in Bihar, were sealed due to the final phase of voting. The Imamganj constituency, which is apparently "simmering [with] tension" over Naxal activity was seen as a security challenge. It also had a quiet campaign. Shiv Shankar Singh, a confidant of the Bihar Assembly Speaker, Uday Narayan Chaudhary, of the constituency said: "There will be no election campaigning in the interiors. Who will take the risk? Public meetings were held only in block headquarters of Dumaria, Imamganj, and Banker Bazar." There were also posters calling for a poll boycott in the days leading up to the poll. Some reports, however, said the constituency is safer now than a decade ago.

Despite the violence, the Chief Election Commissioner S.Y. Quraishi said this was "the most peaceful election ever [held in Bihar]."

=== Electoral code violations ===
First information reports were filed against the head of the RJD, Lalu Prasad Yadav, and his wife Rabri Devi for violating the Election Commission of India's model code of conduct for having brought their own security personnel into the polling booth in Dinapur of Digha constituency in the provincial capital Patna. An FIR was also filed against Bihar's JDU Transport Minister Ram Nandan Singh for having taken two guards into the polling booth while casting his vote in the Parbatta constituency of Khagaria district.

== Results ==
There are a total of 243 seats, with 38 reserved for Scheduled Castes (SC) and 2 for Scheduled Tribes (ST). A total of 875 candidates, including 43 women, stood in the election.

The Lok Sabha by-election for Banka was won by Putul Kumari, an independent candidate.

=== Summary ===
206	25	12
NDA	RJD+	Others

Map displaying constituencies won by parties

Summary of the Bihar Legislative Assembly election result
Parties and Coalitions	Popular vote			Seats		
Parties and Coalitions	Vote	%	+/-	Contested	Won	+/-
Janata Dal (United)	65,61,906	22.58	▲2.15	141	115	▲27
Bharatiya Janata Party	47,90,436	16.49	▲0.81	102	91	▲36
Rashtriya Janata Dal	54,75,656	18.84	▼4.61	168	22	▼32
Lok Janshakti Party	19,57,232	6.74	▼4.35	75	3	▼7
Indian National Congress	24,31,477	8.37	▲2.29	243	4	▼5
Communist Party of India	4,91,630	1.69	▼0.4	56	1	▼2
Jharkhand Mukti Morcha	1,76,400	0.61%		41	1	▲1
Independents	38,42,812	13.22		1,342	6	▼4
Total	2,90,58,604	100.00		243	100.00	±0
Source: Election Commission of India

=== Results by Constituency ===
The following is the list of winning and nearest lost candidate in 2010 Bihar legislative assembly election.

District	Constituency		Winner				Runner Up				Margin	%
District	No.	Name (Note: SC and ST indicate constituencies reserved for Scheduled Castes and Scheduled Tribes respectively.)	Candidate	Party	Votes	%	Candidate	Party	Votes	%	Margin	%
West; Champaran	1	Valmiki Nagar	Rajesh Singh	JD(U)	42,289	29.43	M. K. Kushwaha	RJD	27,618	19.22	14,671	10.21
West; Champaran	2	Ramnagar (SC)	Bhagirathi Devi	BJP	51,993	41.51	Naresh Ram	INC	22,211	17.73	29,782	23.78
West; Champaran	3	Narkatiaganj	Satish Dubey	BJP	45,022	38.06	Alok Prasad Verma	INC	24,794	20.96	20,228	17.10
West; Champaran	4	Bagaha	Prabhat Ranjan Singh	JD(U)	67,510	50.40	Ram Prasad Yadav	RJD	18,455	13.78	49,055	36.62
West; Champaran	5	Lauriya	Vinay Bihari	IND	38,381	33.44	Pradeep Singh	JD(U)	27,500	23.96	10,881	9.48
West; Champaran	6	Nautan	Manorma Prasad	JD(U)	40,894	36.48	Narayan Prasad	LJP	18,130	16.17	22,764	20.31
West; Champaran	7	Chanpatia	Chandra Mohan Rai	BJP	44,835	40.41	Ejaj Hussain	BSP	21,423	19.31	23,412	21.10
West; Champaran	8	Bettiah	Renu Devi	BJP	42,010	39.57	Anil Kumar Jha	IND	13,221	12.45	28,789	27.12
West; Champaran	9	Sikta	Dilip Varma	IND	49,229	39.40	Khurshid Firoj Ahm.	JD(U)	40,450	32.37	8,779	7.03
East; Champaran	10	Raxaul	Dr. Ajay Kumar Singh	BJP	48,686	42.91	Raj Nandan Rai	LJP	38,569	33.99	10,117	8.92
East; Champaran	11	Sugauli	Ramchandra Sahani	BJP	39,021	34.42	Vijay Prasad Gupta	RJD	26,642	23.50	12,379	10.92
East; Champaran	12	Narkatiya	Shyam Bihari Prasad	JD(U)	31,549	26.50	Yasmin Sabir Ali	LJP	23,861	20.04	7,688	6.46
East; Champaran	13	Harsidhi (SC)	Krishana N. Paswan	BJP	48,130	46.87	Surendra Kumar	RJD	30,066	29.28	18,064	17.59
East; Champaran	14	Govindganj	Meena Dwivedi	JD(U)	33,859	34.76	Raju Tiwari	LJP	25,454	26.13	8,405	8.63
East; Champaran	15	Kesaria	Sachindra Pd. Singh	BJP	34,649	36.67	Ram Saran Pd. Yadav	CPI	22,966	24.31	11,683	12.36
East; Champaran	16	Kalyanpur	Razia Khatoon	JD(U)	41,163	42.49	Manoj Kumar Yadav	RJD	25,761	26.59	15,402	15.90
East; Champaran	17	Pipra	Awadhesh Prasad Kush.	JD(U)	40,099	32.77	Subhodh Yadav	RJD	28,212	23.06	11,887	9.71
East; Champaran	18	Madhuban	Shivjee Rai	JD(U)	40,478	39.43	Rana Randhir	RJD	30,356	29.57	10,122	9.86
East; Champaran	19	Motihari	Pramod Kumar	BJP	51,888	42.50	Rajesh Gupta	RJD	27,358	22.41	24,530	20.09
East; Champaran	20	Chiraia	Avaneesh Kumar Singh	BJP	39,459	35.25	Laxmi N. Pr. Yadav	RJD	24,631	22.01	14,828	13.24
East; Champaran	21	Dhaka	Pawan Kumar Jaiswal	IND	48,100	37.98	Faisal Rahman	JD(U)	46,451	36.68	1,649	1.30
Sheohar	22	Sheohar	Sharfuddin	JD(U)	40,447	33.72	Pratima Devi	BSP	38,816	32.36	1,631	1.36
Sitamarhi	23	Riga	Motilal Prasad	BJP	48,633	39.86	Amit Kumar	INC	26,306	21.56	22,327	18.30
Sitamarhi	24	Bathnaha (SC)	Dinkar Ram	BJP	49,181	44.02	Lalita Devi	LJP	35,889	32.12	13,292	11.90
Sitamarhi	25	Parihar	Ram Naresh Pr. Yadav	BJP	32,987	28.57	Dr. Ramchandra Purve	RJD	28,769	24.91	4,218	3.66
Sitamarhi	26	Sursand	Shahid Ali Khan	JD(U)	38,542	33.09	Jainandan Prasad Yadav	RJD	37,356	32.07	1,186	1.02
Sitamarhi	27	Bajpatti	Ranju Geeta	JD(U)	44,726	38.52	Md. Anwarul Haque	RJD	41,306	35.57	3,420	2.95
Sitamarhi	28	Sitamarhi	Sunil Kumar	BJP	51,664	43.59	Raghwendra Singh	LJP	46,443	39.18	5,221	4.41
Sitamarhi	29	Runnisaidpur	Guddi Devi	JD(U)	36,125	33.15	Ram Shatrughan Rai	RJD	25,366	23.28	10,759	9.87
Sitamarhi	30	Belsand	Sunita Singh	JD(U)	38,139	38.80	Sanjay Kumar Gupta	RJD	18,559	18.88	19,580	19.92
Madhubani	31	Harlakhi	Shaligram Yadav	JD(U)	30,281	26.97	Ram Naresh Pandey	CPI	23,622	21.04	6,659	5.93
Madhubani	32	Benipatti	Vinod Narain Jha	BJP	31,198	31.94	Mahesh Chandra Singh	LJP	18,556	19.00	12,642	12.94
Madhubani	33	Khajauli	Arun Shankar Prasad	BJP	44,959	36.21	Sitaram Yadav	RJD	34,246	27.59	10,713	8.62
Madhubani	34	Babubarhi	Uma Kant Yadav	RJD	51,772	40.53	Kapildeb Kamat	JD(U)	46,859	36.68	4,913	3.85
Madhubani	35	Bisfi	Dr. Faiyaj Ahmad	RJD	47,169	40.98	Hari Bhushan Thakur	JD(U)	37,668	32.72	9,501	8.26
Madhubani	36	Madhubani	Ram Deo Mahto	BJP	44,817	37.01	Naiyar Azam	RJD	44,229	36.53	588	0.48
Madhubani	37	Rajnagar (SC)	Ram Lakhan	RJD	40,584	38.02	Ramprit Paswan	BJP	38,125	35.71	2,459	2.31
Madhubani	38	Jhanjharpur	Nitish Mishra	JD(U)	57,652	49.15	Jagat Narayan Singh	RJD	36,971	31.52	20,681	17.63
Madhubani	39	Phulparas	Guljar Devi	JD(U)	36,113	28.49	Virendra Kumar Ch.	RJD	23,769	18.75	12,344	9.74
Madhubani	40	Laukaha	Hari Prasad Sah	JD(U)	47,849	34.83	Chitaranjan Yadav	RJD	30,283	22.04	17,566	12.79
Supaul	41	Nirmali	Aniruddha Prasad Yadav	JD(U)	70,150	53.77	Vijay Kumar Gupta	INC	24,140	18.50	46,010	35.27
Supaul	42	Pipra	Sujata Devi	JD(U)	44,883	35.84	Dinbandhu Yadav	LJP	30,197	24.11	14,686	11.73
Supaul	43	Supaul	Bijendra Ps. Yadav	JD(U)	55,179	45.47	Ravindra Raman	RJD	39,779	32.78	15,400	12.69
Supaul	44	Triveniganj (SC)	Amla Devi	JD(U)	63,729	48.96	Anant Kumar Bharti	LJP	44,706	34.34	19,023	14.62
Supaul	45	Chhatapur	Neeraj Kumar Singh	JD(U)	66,895	48.93	Akeel Ahmad	RJD	43,165	31.57	23,730	17.36
Araria	46	Narpatganj	Devanti Yadav	BJP	61,106	40.99	Anil Kumar Yadav	RJD	54,169	36.33	6,937	4.66
Araria	47	Raniganj (SC)	Parmanand Rishideo	BJP	65,111	49.63	Shanti Devi	RJD	41,458	31.60	23,653	18.03
Araria	48	Forbesganj	Padam Parag Roy	BJP	70,463	48.94	Maya Nand Thakur	LJP	43,636	30.31	26,827	18.63
Araria	49	Araria	Zakir Hussain Khan	LJP	49,532	38.53	Narayan Kumar Jha	BJP	31,471	24.48	18,061	14.05
Araria	50	Jokihat	Sarfraz Alam	JD(U)	44,027	35.33	Koshar Zia	IND	18,697	15.00	25,330	20.33
Araria	51	Sikti	Anandi Prasad Yadav	BJP	42,076	31.18	Vijay Kumar Mandal	LJP	32,202	23.86	9,874	7.32
Kishanganj	52	Bahadurganj	Md. Tousif Alam	INC	30,551	27.17	Md Maswar Alam	JD(U)	26,752	23.79	3,799	3.38
Kishanganj	53	Thakurganj	Naushad Alam	LJP	36,372	28.30	Gopal Kumar Agarwal	JD(U)	29,409	22.88	6,963	5.42
Kishanganj	54	Kishanganj	Mhd. Jawaid	INC	38,867	31.38	Sweety Singh	BJP	38,603	31.16	264	0.22
Kishanganj	55	Kochadhaman	Akhatarul Iman	RJD	37,376	36.27	Mujahid Alam	JD(U)	28,351	27.52	9,025	8.75
Purnia	56	Amour	Saba Zafar	BJP	57,774	46.33	Abdul Jalil Mastan	INC	38,946	31.23	18,828	15.10
Purnia	57	Baisi	Santosh Kumar	BJP	39,939	32.58	Nasar Ahamad	INC	30,689	25.03	9,250	7.55
Purnia	58	Kasba	Md. Afaque Alam	INC	63,025	47.07	Pradip Kumar Das	BJP	58,570	43.74	4,455	3.33
Purnia	59	Banmankhi (SC)	Krishna Kumar Rishi	BJP	67,950	53.71	Dharmlal Rishi	RJD	23,060	18.23	44,890	35.48
Purnia	60	Rupauli	Bima Bharti	JD(U)	64,887	46.63	Shankar Singh	LJP	27,171	19.53	37,716	27.10
Purnia	61	Dhamdaha	Leshi Singh	JD(U)	64,323	44.02	Irshad Ahmad Khan	INC	19,626	13.43	44,697	30.59
Purnia	62	Purnia	Raj Kishore Keshari	BJP	54,605	41.42	Ram Charitra Yadav	INC	39,006	29.58	15,599	11.84
Katihar	63	Katihar	Tar Kishore Prasad	BJP	58,718	46.87	Dr. Ram Prakash Mahto	RJD	38,111	30.42	20,607	16.45
Katihar	64	Kadwa	Bhola Ray	BJP	38,225	31.86	Himraj Singh	NCP	19,858	16.55	18,367	15.31
Katihar	65	Balrampur	Dulal Ch. Goshwami	IND	48,136	32.69	Mahboob Alam	CPI(ML)	45,432	30.85	2,704	1.84
Katihar	66	Pranpur	Binod Kumar Singh	BJP	43,660	31.59	Israt Parween	NCP	42,944	31.07	716	0.52
Katihar	67	Manihari (ST)	Manohar Prasad Singh	JD(U)	44,938	35.63	Gita Kisku	NCP	40,773	32.32	4,165	3.31
Katihar	68	Barari	Bibhasha Chandra Ch.	BJP	58,104	42.48	Mohammed Shakoor	NCP	30,936	22.62	27,168	19.86
Katihar	69	Korha (SC)	Mahesh Paswan	BJP	71,020	55.29	Sunita Devi	INC	18,576	14.46	52,444	40.83
Madhepura	70	Alamnagar	Narendra N. Yadav	JD(U)	64,967	42.16	Lovely Anand	INC	22,622	14.68	42,345	27.48
Madhepura	71	Bihariganj	Renu Kumari	JD(U)	79,062	51.80	Prabhash Kumar	RJD	29,065	19.04	49,997	32.76
Madhepura	72	Singheshwar (SC)	Ramesh Rishidev	JD(U)	72,282	49.75	Amit Kumar Bharti	RJD	57,086	39.29	15,196	10.46
Madhepura	73	Madhepura	Chandrashekhar	RJD	72,481	47.29	Ramendra Yadav	JD(U)	60,537	39.50	11,944	7.79
Saharsa	74	Sonbarsha (SC)	Ratnesh Sada	JD(U)	56,633	47.37	Sarita Devi	LJP	25,188	21.07	31,445	26.30
Saharsa	75	Saharsa	Alok Ranjan	BJP	55,687	36.69	Arun Kumar	RJD	47,708	31.43	7,979	5.26
Saharsa	76	Simri Bakhtiarpur	Dr. Arun Kumar	JD(U)	57,980	44.07	Ch. Mehboob Ali Kaisar	INC	39,138	29.75	18,842	14.32
Saharsa	77	Mahishi	Dr. Abdul Gafoor	RJD	39,158	33.39	Raj Kumar Sah	JD(U)	37,441	31.92	1,717	1.47
Darbhanga	78	Kusheshwar; Asthan (SC)	Shashi Bhushan Hajari	BJP	28,576	31.58	Ramchandra Paswan	LJP	23,064	25.49	5,512	6.09
Darbhanga	79	Gaura Bauram	Dr. Izhar Ahmad	JD(U)	33,258	36.76	Dr. Mahavir Prasad	RJD	22,656	25.04	10,602	11.72
Darbhanga	80	Benipur	Gopal Jee Thakur	BJP	43,222	40.33	Hare Krishna Yadav	RJD	29,265	27.31	13,957	13.02
Darbhanga	81	Alinagar	Abdul Bari Siddiqui	RJD	37,923	37.22	Prabhakar Choudhary	JD(U)	32,934	32.32	4,989	4.90
Darbhanga	82	Darbhanga Rural	Lalit Kumar Yadav	RJD	29,776	29.27	Ashraf Hussain	JD(U)	26,100	25.65	3,676	3.62
Darbhanga	83	Darbhanga	Sanjay Saraogi	BJP	64,136	54.08	Sultan Ahmad	RJD	36,582	30.85	27,554	23.23
Darbhanga	84	Hayaghat	Amar Nath Gami	BJP	32,023	35.22	Shahnawaz Ahmad Kaifee	LJP	25,998	28.59	6,025	6.63
Darbhanga	85	Bahadurpur	Madan Sahni	JD(U)	27,320	23.65	Harinandan Yadav	RJD	26,677	23.09	643	0.56
Darbhanga	86	Keoti	Ashok Kumar Yadav	BJP	45,791	42.11	Faraz Fatmi	RJD	45,762	42.08	29	0.03
Darbhanga	87	Jale	Vijay Kumar Mishra	BJP	42,590	39.44	Ramniwas Pd.	RJD	25,648	23.75	16,942	15.69
Muzaffarpur	88	Gaighat	Veena Devi	BJP	56,386	43.46	Maheshwar Prasad Yadav	RJD	40,399	31.13	15,987	12.33
Muzaffarpur	89	Aurai	Ram Surat Rai	BJP	38,422	32.93	Surendra Kumar	RJD	26,681	22.87	11,741	10.06
Muzaffarpur	90	Minapur	Dinesh Prasad	JD(U)	42,286	34.06	Rajeev Kumar	RJD	36,884	29.71	5,402	4.35
Muzaffarpur	91	Bochahan (SC)	Ramai Ram	JD(U)	61,885	50.58	Musafir Paswan	RJD	37,758	30.86	24,127	19.72
Muzaffarpur	92	Sakra (SC)	Suresh Chanchal	JD(U)	55,486	48.01	Lal Babu Ram	RJD	42,441	36.72	13,045	11.29
Muzaffarpur	93	Kurhani	Manoj Kumar Singh	JD(U)	36,757	28.28	Bijendra Chaudhary	LJP	35,187	27.07	1,570	1.21
Muzaffarpur	94	Muzaffarpur	Suresh Kumar Sharma	BJP	72,301	59.36	Mohhammad Jamal	LJP	25,862	21.23	46,439	38.13
Muzaffarpur	95	Kanti	Ajit Kumar	JD(U)	39,648	31.79	Md. Israil	RJD	31,233	25.04	8,415	6.75
Muzaffarpur	96	Baruraj	Brij Kishor Singh	RJD	42,783	37.98	Nand Kumar Rai	JD(U)	28,466	25.27	14,317	12.71
Muzaffarpur	97	Paroo	Ashok Kumar Singh	BJP	53,609	43.18	Mithilesh Prasad Yadav	RJD	34,582	27.86	19,027	15.32
Muzaffarpur	98	Sahebganj	Raju Kumar Singh	JD(U)	46,606	38.51	Ram Vichar Ray	RJD	41,690	34.45	4,916	4.06
Gopalganj	99	Baikunthpur	Manjeet Kumar Singh	JD(U)	70,105	55.93	Devdatt Prasad	RJD	33,581	26.79	36,524	29.14
Gopalganj	100	Barauli	Ram Pravesh Rai	BJP	45,234	39.38	M. Nematullah	RJD	34,820	30.31	10,414	9.07
Gopalganj	101	Gopalganj	Subas Singh	BJP	58,010	45.55	Reyazul Haque	RJD	42,117	33.07	15,893	12.48
Gopalganj	102	Kuchaikote	Amrendra Kumar Pandey	JD(U)	51,815	40.92	Aditya Narain Pandey	RJD	32,297	25.50	19,518	15.42
Gopalganj	103	Bhorey (SC)	Idradeo Majhi	BJP	61,401	51.26	Bachchan Das	RJD	17,831	14.89	43,570	36.37
Gopalganj	104	Hathua	Ram Sewak Singh	JD(U)	50,708	42.40	Rajesh Kumar Singh	RJD	27,861	23.29	22,847	19.11
Siwan	105	Siwan	Vyasdeo Prasad	BJP	51,637	44.20	Awadhvihari Chaudhry	RJD	39,096	33.47	12,541	10.73
Siwan	106	Ziradei	Asha Devi	BJP	29,442	27.25	Amarjeet Kushwaha	CPI(ML)	20,522	18.99	8,920	8.26
Siwan	107	Darauli (SC)	Ramayan Manjhi	BJP	40,993	35.03	Satyadeo Ram	CPI(ML)	33,987	29.04	7,006	5.99
Siwan	108	Raghunathpur	Vikram Kunwar	BJP	33,474	32.34	Amar Nath Yadav	CPI(ML)	18,362	17.74	15,112	14.60
Siwan	109	Daraundha	Jagmato Devi	JD(U)	49,115	44.30	Binod Kumar Singh	RJD	17,980	16.22	31,135	28.08
Siwan	110	Barharia	Shyam Bahadur Singh	JD(U)	53,707	46.65	Mahamad Mobin	RJD	28,586	24.83	25,121	21.82
Siwan	111	Goriyakothi	Bhumendra Narayan	BJP	42,533	34.06	Indradeo Prasad	RJD	28,512	22.83	14,021	11.23
Siwan	112	Maharajganj	Damodar Singh	JD(U)	40,232	36.22	Manik Chand Rai	RJD	20,232	18.21	20,000	18.01
Saran	113	Ekma	Manoranjan Singh	JD(U)	55,474	53.87	Kameshwar Kr. Singh	RJD	26,273	25.51	29,201	28.36
Saran	114	Manjhi	Gautam Singh	JD(U)	28,687	26.88	Hem Narayan Singh	RJD	20,783	19.47	7,904	7.41
Saran	115	Baniapur	Kedar Nath Singh	RJD	45,259	40.34	Virendra Kumar Ojha	JD(U)	41,684	37.16	3,575	3.18
Saran	116	Taraiya	Janak Singh	BJP	26,600	26.57	Tarkeshwar Singh	INC	19,630	19.61	6,970	6.96
Saran	117	Marhaura	Jitendra Kumar Rai	RJD	26,374	26.54	Lal Babu Ray	JD(U)	20,750	20.88	5,624	5.66
Saran	118	Chapra	Janardan Singh Sigriwal	BJP	61,045	53.36	Pramendra R. Singh	RJD	25,174	22.00	35,871	31.36
Saran	119	Garkha (SC)	Gyan Chand Manjhi	BJP	41,033	39.60	Muneshwar Chaudhary	RJD	39,246	37.87	1,787	1.73
Saran	120	Amnour	Krishana Kumar	JD(U)	29,508	30.54	Sunil Kumar	IND	18,991	19.65	10,517	10.89
Saran	121	Parsa	Chhotelal Rai	JD(U)	44,828	44.32	Chandrika Rai	RJD	40,139	39.68	4,689	4.64
Saran	122	Sonepur	Vinay Kumar Singh	BJP	64,676	53.76	Rabri Devi	RJD	43,991	36.56	20,685	17.20
Vaishali	123	Hajipur	Nityanand Roy	BJP	55,315	41.46	Rajendra Rai	LJP	38,706	29.01	16,609	12.45
Vaishali	124	Lalganj	Annu Shukla	JD(U)	58,210	40.80	Raj Kumar Sah	IND	34,065	23.88	24,145	16.92
Vaishali	125	Vaishali	Brishin Patel	JD(U)	60,950	45.15	Veena Shahi	RJD	48,122	35.65	12,828	9.50
Vaishali	126	Mahua	Ravindra Ray	JD(U)	46,309	40.03	Jageshwar Ray	RJD	24,384	21.08	21,925	18.95
Vaishali	127	Raja Pakar (SC)	Sanjay Kumar	JD(U)	43,212	41.97	Gaurishankar Paswan	LJP	32,997	32.05	10,215	9.92
Vaishali	128	Raghopur	Satish Kumar	JD(U)	64,222	48.06	Rabri Devi	RJD	51,216	38.32	13,006	9.74
Vaishali	129	Mahnar	Dr. Achyuatanand	BJP	29,754	25.01	Rama Kishor Singh	LJP	27,265	22.92	2,489	2.09
Vaishali	130	Patepur (SC)	Mahendra Baitha	BJP	53,762	46.79	Prema Chaudhary	RJD	37,095	32.28	16,667	14.51
Samastipur	131	Kalyanpur (SC)	Ramsewak Hazari	JD(U)	62,124	48.17	Bishwnath Paswan	LJP	31,927	24.76	30,197	23.41
Samastipur	132	Warisnagar	Ashok Kumar	JD(U)	46,245	33.96	Gajendra Prasad Singh	RJD	26,745	19.64	19,500	14.32
Samastipur	133	Samastipur	Akhtarul Islam Sahin	RJD	42,852	36.69	Ramnath Thakur	JD(U)	41,025	35.12	1,827	1.57
Samastipur	134	Ujiarpur	Durga Prasad Singh	RJD	42,791	32.71	Ram Lakhan Mahto	JD(U)	29,760	22.75	13,031	9.96
Samastipur	135	Morwa	Baidhnath Sahani	JD(U)	40,271	38.36	Ashok Singh	RJD	33,421	31.84	6,850	6.52
Samastipur	136	Sarairanjan	Vijay Kumar Ch.	JD(U)	53,946	45.44	Ramashraya Sahni	RJD	36,389	30.65	17,557	14.79
Samastipur	137	Mohiuddinnagar	Rana Gangeshwar	BJP	51,756	49.24	Ajay Kumar Bulganin	RJD	37,405	35.59	14,351	13.65
Samastipur	138	Bibhutpur	Ram Balak Singh	JD(U)	46,469	38.30	Ramdeo Verma	CPI(M)	34,168	28.16	12,301	10.14
Samastipur	139	Rosera (SC)	Manju Hajari	BJP	57,930	45.29	Pitamber Paswan	RJD	45,811	35.82	12,119	9.47
Samastipur	140	Hasanpur	Raj Kumar Ray	JD(U)	36,767	31.51	Sunil Kumar Puspam	RJD	33,476	28.69	3,291	2.82
Begusarai	141	Cheria Bariarpur	Kumari Manju Verma	JD(U)	32,807	28.73	Anil Kumar Chaudhary	LJP	31,746	27.80	1,061	0.93
Begusarai	142	Bachhwara	Abdhesh Kumar Rai	CPI	33,770	25.99	Arvind Kumar Singh	IND	21,683	16.69	12,087	9.30
Begusarai	143	Teghra	Lalan Ku.	BJP	38,694	31.37	Ram Ratan Singh	CPI	32,848	26.63	5,846	4.74
Begusarai	144	Matihani	Narendra Kumar Singh	JD(U)	60,530	40.52	Abhay Kumar Sarjan	INC	36,702	24.57	23,828	15.95
Begusarai	145	Sahebpur Kamal	Parveen Amanullah	JD(U)	46,391	42.96	Shreenarayan Yadav	RJD	35,280	32.67	11,111	10.29
Begusarai	146	Begusarai	Surendra Mehta	BJP	50,602	39.21	Upendra Prasad Singh	LJP	30,984	24.01	19,618	15.20
Begusarai	147	Bakhri (SC)	Ramanand Ram	BJP	43,871	36.98	Ram Binod Paswan	LJP	25,459	21.46	18,412	15.52
Khagaria	148	Alauli (SC)	Ram Chandra Sada	JD(U)	53,775	49.63	Pashupati Kumar Paras	LJP	36,252	33.46	17,523	16.17
Khagaria	149	Khagaria	Poonam Devi Yadav	JD(U)	48,841	42.91	Sushila Devi	LJP	21,988	19.32	26,853	23.59
Khagaria	150	Beldaur	Pannalal Singh "Patel"	JD(U)	45,990	34.59	Sunita Sharma	LJP	30,252	22.76	15,738	11.83
Khagaria	151	Parbatta	Samrat Choudhary	RJD	60,428	42.81	Ramanand Prasad Singh	JD(U)	59,620	42.24	808	0.57
Bhagalpur	152	Bihpur	Kumar Shailendra	BJP	48,027	41.05	Shailesh Kumar	RJD	47,562	40.66	465	0.39
Bhagalpur	153	Gopalpur	Narendra Kumar Niraj	JD(U)	53,876	47.01	Amit Rana	RJD	28,816	25.14	25,060	21.87
Bhagalpur	154	Pirpainti (SC)	Aman Kumar	BJP	48,493	37.57	Ram Vilash Paswan	RJD	42,741	33.11	5,752	4.46
Bhagalpur	155	Kahalgaon	Sadanand Singh	INC	44,936	33.97	Kahkashan Perween	JD(U)	36,001	27.21	8,935	6.76
Bhagalpur	156	Bhagalpur	Ashwini Km. Choubey	BJP	49,164	42.03	Ajeet Sharma	INC	38,104	32.57	11,060	9.46
Bhagalpur	157	Sultanganj	Subodh Rai	JD(U)	34,652	28.05	Ramavatar Mandal	RJD	29,807	24.13	4,845	3.92
Bhagalpur	158	Nathnagar	Ajai Kumar Mandal	JD(U)	42,094	34.43	Abu Kaishar	RJD	37,367	30.57	4,727	3.86
Banka	159	Amarpur	Janardan Manjhi	JD(U)	47,300	40.78	Surendra Prasad Singh	RJD	29,293	25.25	18,007	15.53
Banka	160	Dhoraiya (SC)	Manish Kumar	JD(U)	40,261	35.71	Naresh Das	RJD	31,919	28.31	8,342	7.40
Banka	161	Banka	Javed Iqbal Ansari	RJD	29,047	27.23	Ram Narayan Mandal	BJP	26,637	24.97	2,410	2.26
Banka	162	Katoria (ST)	Sonelal Hembram	BJP	32,332	37.95	Suklal Besara	RJD	23,569	27.67	8,763	10.28
Banka	163	Belhar	Giridhari Yadav	JD(U)	33,776	28.07	Ramdeo Yadav	RJD	26,160	21.74	7,616	6.33
Munger	164	Tarapur	Neeta Choudhary	JD(U)	44,582	37.42	Shakuni Choudhary	RJD	30,704	25.77	13,878	11.65
Munger	165	Munger	Anant Kumar Satyarthy	JD(U)	55,086	42.49	Shabnam Perwin	RJD	37,473	28.90	17,613	13.59
Munger	166	Jamalpur	Shailesh Kumar	JD(U)	48,337	42.12	Sadhana Devi	LJP	27,195	23.70	21,142	18.42
Lakhisarai	167	Suryagarha	Prem Ranjan Patel	BJP	49,511	38.53	Prahlad Yadav	RJD	46,583	36.26	2,928	2.27
Lakhisarai	168	Lakhisarai	Vijay Kumar Sinha	BJP	78,457	53.99	Fulaina Singh	RJD	18,837	12.96	59,620	41.03
Sheikhpura	169	Sheikhpura	Randhir Kumar Soni	JD(U)	31,507	30.53	Sunila Devi	INC	24,165	23.42	7,342	7.11
Sheikhpura	170	Barbigha	Gajanand Shahi	JD(U)	24,136	26.12	Ashok Choudhary	INC	21,089	22.82	3,047	3.30
Nalanda	171	Asthawan	Jitendra Kumar	JD(U)	54,176	50.64	Kapildev Prasad Singh	LJP	34,606	32.35	19,570	18.29
Nalanda	172	Biharsharif	Dr. Sunil Kumar	JD(U)	77,880	51.85	Aafrin Sultana	RJD	54,168	36.07	23,712	15.78
Nalanda	173	Rajgir (SC)	Satyadeo Narain Arya	BJP	50,648	49.75	Dhananjay Kumar	LJP	23,697	23.28	26,951	26.47
Nalanda	174	Islampur	Rajib Ranjan	JD(U)	56,332	49.24	Virendra Gop	RJD	32,524	28.43	23,808	20.81
Nalanda	175	Hilsa	Usha Sinha	JD(U)	54,974	43.62	Rina Devi	LJP	41,772	33.14	13,202	10.48
Nalanda	176	Nalanda	Shrawon Kumar	JD(U)	58,067	48.03	Arun Kumar	RJD	37,030	30.63	21,037	17.40
Nalanda	177	Harnaut	Harinarayan Singh	JD(U)	56,827	47.32	Arun Kumar	LJP	41,785	34.79	15,042	12.53
Patna	178	Mokama	Anant Kumar Singh	JD(U)	51,564	44.08	Sonam Devi	LJP	42,610	36.43	8,954	7.65
Patna	179	Barh	Gyanendra Kumar Singh	JD(U)	53,129	47.01	Vijay Krishna	RJD	33,734	29.85	19,395	17.16
Patna	180	Bakhtiarpur	Aniruddh Kumar	RJD	52,782	46.60	Vinode Yadav	BJP	38,037	33.58	14,745	13.02
Patna	181	Digha	Punam Devi	JD(U)	81,247	62.03	Satya Nand Sharma	LJP	20,785	15.87	60,462	46.16
Patna	182	Bankipur	Nitin Nabin	BJP	78,771	72.06	Binod Kumar Srivastava	RJD	17,931	16.40	60,840	55.66
Patna	183	Kumhrar	Arun Kumar Sinha	BJP	83,425	72.04	Md. Kamal Parwez	LJP	15,617	13.49	67,808	58.55
Patna	184	Patna Sahib	Nand Kishore Yadav	BJP	91,419	68.07	Parvej Ahmad	INC	26,082	19.42	65,337	48.65
Patna	185	Fatuha	Dr. Ramanand Yadav	RJD	50,218	44.93	Ajay Kumar Singh	JD(U)	40,562	36.29	9,656	8.64
Patna	186	Danapur	Asha Devi	BJP	59,425	47.52	Rit Lal Ray	IND	41,506	33.19	17,919	14.33
Patna	187	Maner	Bhai Virendra	RJD	57,818	43.69	Srikant Nirala	JD(U)	48,217	36.43	9,601	7.26
Patna	188	Phulwari (SC)	Shyam Rajak	JD(U)	67,390	49.75	Uday Kumar	RJD	46,210	34.11	21,180	15.64
Patna	189	Masaurhi (SC)	Arun Manjhi	JD(U)	56,977	39.94	Anil Kumar	LJP	51,945	36.41	5,032	3.53
Patna	190	Paliganj	Dr. Usha Vidyarthi	BJP	43,692	37.70	Jai Vardhan Yadav	RJD	33,450	28.86	10,242	8.84
Patna	191	Bikram	Anil Kumar	BJP	38,965	29.57	Siddharth	LJP	36,613	27.79	2,352	1.78
Bhojpur	192	Sandesh	Sanjay Singh	BJP	29,988	26.57	Arun Kumar	IND	23,166	20.53	6,822	6.04
Bhojpur	193	Barhara	Raghwendra Pratap	RJD	46,102	41.52	Asha Devi	JD(U)	45,019	40.54	1,083	0.98
Bhojpur	194	Arrah	Amrendra Pratap Singh	BJP	56,504	49.81	Shree Kumar Singh	LJP	37,564	33.11	18,940	16.70
Bhojpur	195	Agiaon (SC)	Shivesh Kumar	BJP	29,257	31.68	Suresh Paswan	RJD	24,008	25.99	5,249	5.69
Bhojpur	196	Tarari	Narendra Km. Pandey	JD(U)	48,413	37.89	Adib Rizvi	RJD	34,093	26.68	14,320	11.21
Bhojpur	197	Jagdishpur	Dinesh Kumar Singh	RJD	55,560	42.65	Sribhagwan Kushwaha	JD(U)	45,374	34.83	10,186	7.82
Bhojpur	198	Shahpur	Munni Devi	BJP	44,795	40.29	Dharmpal Singh	RJD	36,584	32.90	8,211	7.39
Buxar	199	Brahampur	Dilmarni Devi	BJP	46,196	36.67	Ajit Chaudhary	RJD	25,854	20.52	20,342	16.15
Buxar	200	Buxar	Prof. Sukhada Pande	BJP	48,062	37.52	Shyam Lal Singh	RJD	27,879	21.76	20,183	15.76
Buxar	201	Dumraon	Dr. Daud Ali	JD(U)	42,538	34.14	Sunil Kumar	RJD	22,692	18.21	19,846	15.93
Buxar	202	Rajpur (SC)	Santosh Kumar Nirala	JD(U)	54,802	39.76	Chhedi Lal Ram	LJP	39,563	28.70	15,239	11.06
Kaimur	203	Ramgarh	Ambika Singh	RJD	30,787	24.99	Ashok Kumar Singh	IND	27,809	22.57	2,978	2.42
Kaimur	204	Mohania (SC)	Chhedi Paswan	JD(U)	38,918	34.81	Niranjan Ram	RJD	36,393	32.55	2,525	2.26
Kaimur	205	Bhabua	Pramod Kr. Singh	LJP	31,246	26.24	Anand Bhushan Pandey	BJP	30,799	25.86	447	0.38
Kaimur	206	Chainpur	Brij Kishor Vind	BJP	46,510	32.75	Dr. Ajay Alok	BSP	32,930	23.18	13,580	9.57
Rohtas	207	Chenari (SC)	Shyam Bihari Ram	JD(U)	44,586	35.16	Lalan Pasawan	RJD	41,685	32.88	2,901	2.28
Rohtas	208	Sasaram	Jawahar Prasad	BJP	50,856	35.19	Dr. Ashok Kumar	RJD	45,445	31.45	5,411	3.74
Rohtas	209	Kargahar	Ram Dhani Singh	JD(U)	54,190	36.19	Shiv Shankar Singh	LJP	40,993	27.38	13,197	8.81
Rohtas	210	Dinara	Jay Kumar Singh	JD(U)	47,176	39.22	Sita Sundari Devi	RJD	30,566	25.41	16,610	13.81
Rohtas	211	Nokha	Rameshwar Prasad	BJP	39,020	33.44	Kanti Singh	RJD	27,297	23.39	11,723	10.05
Rohtas	212	Dehri	Jyoti Rashmi	IND	43,634	35.29	Md. Iliyas Husain	RJD	33,819	27.35	9,815	7.94
Rohtas	213	Karakat	Rajeshwar Raj	JD(U)	49,751	38.93	Munna Rai	RJD	38,336	30.00	11,415	8.93
Arwal	214	Arwal	Chitranjan Kumar	BJP	23,984	25.31	Mahanand Prasad	CPI(ML)	19,782	20.88	4,202	4.43
Arwal	215	Kurtha	Satyadev Singh	JD(U)	37,633	40.96	Shiv Bachan Yadav	RJD	28,140	30.63	9,493	10.33
Jehanabad	216	Jehanabad	Abhiram Sharma	JD(U)	35,508	32.10	Sachchita Nand Yadav	RJD	26,941	24.36	8,567	7.74
Jehanabad	217	Ghosi	Rahul Kumar	JD(U)	40,364	38.77	Jagdish Prasad	LJP	26,088	25.05	14,276	13.72
Jehanabad	218	Makhdumpur (SC)	Jitan Ram Manjhi	JD(U)	38,463	42.65	Dharmraj Paswan	RJD	33,378	37.01	5,085	5.64
Aurangabad	219	Goh	Dr. Ranvijay Kumar	JD(U)	47,378	39.46	Ram Ayodhya Prasad	RJD	46,684	38.88	694	0.58
Aurangabad	220	Obra	Somprakash Singh	IND	36,816	28.27	Pramod Chadravanshi	JD(U)	36,014	27.65	802	0.62
Aurangabad	221	Nabinagar	Virendra Kumar Singh	JD(U)	36,860	36.20	Vijay Kumar Singh	LJP	25,026	24.58	11,834	11.62
Aurangabad	222	Kutumba (SC)	Lalan Ram	JD(U)	42,559	45.54	Suresh Paswan	RJD	28,649	30.65	13,910	14.89
Aurangabad	223	Aurangabad	Ramadhar Singh	BJP	41,176	36.99	Sunil Kumar Singh	RJD	34,934	31.38	6,242	5.61
Aurangabad	224	Rafiganj	Ashok Kumar Singh	JD(U)	58,501	49.58	Md Nehaluddin	RJD	34,816	29.51	23,685	20.07
Gaya	225	Gurua	Surendra Prasad Sinha	BJP	46,767	38.76	Bindeshwari Yadav	RJD	35,331	29.28	11,436	9.48
Gaya	226	Sherghati	Vinod Prasad Yadav	JD(U)	25,447	23.63	Sushama Devi	IND	18,944	17.59	6,503	6.04
Gaya	227	Imamganj (SC)	Uday Narain Choudhary	JD(U)	44,126	40.45	Raushan Kumar	RJD	42,915	39.34	1,211	1.11
Gaya	228	Barachatti (SC)	Jyoti Devi	JD(U)	57,550	50.18	Samta Devi	RJD	33,804	29.47	23,746	20.71
Gaya	229	Bodh Gaya (SC)	Shyam Deo Paswan	BJP	54,160	44.39	Kumar Sarvjeet	LJP	42,947	35.20	11,213	9.19
Gaya	230	Gaya Town	Prem Kumar	BJP	55,618	53.92	Jalal Uddin Ansari	CPI	27,201	26.37	28,417	27.55
Gaya	231	Tikari	Dr. Anil Kumar	JD(U)	67,706	51.33	Bagi Kumar Verma	RJD	49,165	37.27	18,541	14.06
Gaya	232	Belaganj	Surendra Prasad Yadav	RJD	53,079	43.58	Mohammad Amzad	JD(U)	48,441	39.77	4,638	3.81
Gaya	233	Atri	Krishna Nandan Yadav	JD(U)	55,633	47.54	Kunti Devi	RJD	35,023	29.93	20,610	17.61
Gaya	234	Wazirganj	Virendra Singh	BJP	38,893	31.86	Awadhesh Km. Singh	INC	21,127	17.31	17,766	14.55
Nawada	235	Rajauli (SC)	Kanhaiya Kumar	BJP	51,020	47.19	Prakash Bir	RJD	36,930	34.15	14,090	13.04
Nawada	236	Hisua	Anil Singh	BJP	43,110	34.65	Anil Mehta	LJP	39,132	31.45	3,978	3.20
Nawada	237	Nawada	Purnima Yadav	JD(U)	46,568	39.13	Rajballabh Prasad	RJD	40,231	33.80	6,337	5.33
Nawada	238	Gobindpur	Kaushal Yadav	JD(U)	45,589	45.55	Prof. K. B. Prasad	LJP	24,702	24.68	20,887	20.87
Nawada	239	Warsaliganj	Pradip Kumar	JD(U)	42,381	35.07	Aruna Devi	INC	36,953	30.57	5,428	4.50
Jamui	240	Sikandra (SC)	Rameshwar Paswan	JD(U)	39,829	38.36	Subhash Ch. Bosh	LJP	27,468	26.46	12,361	11.90
Jamui	241	Jamui	Ajay Pratap	JD(U)	60,130	49.37	Vijay Prakash	RJD	35,663	29.28	24,467	20.09
Jamui	242	Jhajha	Damodar Rawat	JD(U)	48,080	38.74	Binod Prasad Yadav	RJD	37,876	30.52	10,204	8.22
Jamui	243	Chakai	Sumit Singh	JMM	21,809	20.15	Bijay Kumar Singh	LJP	21,621	19.97	188	0.18

== Bypolls (2010-2015) ==
S.No	Date	Constituency	MLA before election	Party before election	Elected MLA	Party after election
62	25 June 2011	Purnia	Raj Kishore Kesri	Bharatiya Janata Party	Kiran Devi	Bharatiya Janata Party
131	24 February 2013	Kalyanpur	Ram Sewak Hazari	Janata Dal (United)	Manju Kumari	Janata Dal (United)
156	21 August 2014	Bhagalpur	Ashwini Kumar Choubey	Bharatiya Janata Party	Ajeet Sharma	Indian National Congress
87	21 August 2014	Jale	Vijay Kumar Mishra	Bharatiya Janata Party	Rishi Mishra	Janata Dal (United)
137	21 August 2014	Mohiuddinnagar	Rana Gangeshwar Singh	Bharatiya Janata Party	Ajay Kumar Bulganin	Rashtriya Janata Dal
118	21 August 2014	Chapra	Janardan Singh Sigriwal	Bharatiya Janata Party	Randhir Kumar Singh	Rashtriya Janata Dal
123	21 August 2014	Hajipur	Nityanand Roy	Bharatiya Janata Party	Awadhesh Singh	Bharatiya Janata Party
3	21 August 2014	Narkatiaganj	Satish Chandra Dubey	Bharatiya Janata Party	Rashmi Verma	Bharatiya Janata Party
204	21 August 2014	Mohania	Chhedi Paswan	Janata Dal (United)	Niranjan Ram	Bharatiya Janata Party
161	21 August 2014	Banka	Javed Iqbal Ansari	Rashtriya Janata Dal	Ramnarayan Mandal	Bharatiya Janata Party
151	21 August 2014	Parbatta	Samrat Choudhary	Rashtriya Janata Dal	Ramanand Prasad Singh	Janata Dal (United)
37	21 August 2014	Rajnagar	Ram Lakhan Ram Raman	Rashtriya Janata Dal	Rama Watar Paswan	Rashtriya Janata Dal

== See also ==
- List of constituencies of Bihar Legislative Assembly
- 2015 Bihar Legislative Assembly election
