= Maheshwar Singh (Bihar politician) =

Indian politician

Member of the Bihar Legislative Council
- Incumbent
- Assumed office 2022-04-08
- Constituency: Local Bodies, East Champaran

Members of Bihar Legislative Assembly
- In office 2005–2010
- Preceded by: Awadhesh Prasad Kushwaha
- Succeeded by: Krishnanandan Paswan
- Constituency: Harsidhi

Personal details
- Party: Independent
- Other political affiliations: Bhartiya Janta Party
- Parent: RAMASHIS SINGH

Maheshwar Singh is an Indian politician, who is currently the Member of Legislative Council from East Champaran as an independent candidate. He is also the former Member of Bihar Legislative Assembly from Harsidhi, he won the 2005 Bihar Legislative Assembly election as a Lok Janshakti Party candidate.

After winning the MLC election he has promised to support anyone who speaks for the development of Champaran.
