= Manju Prakash =

Indian politician (born 1965)

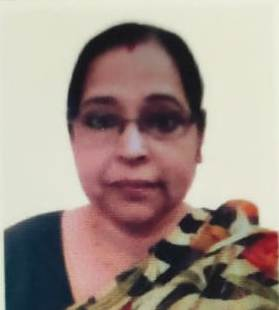

Member of Bihar Legislative Assembly
- In office 1990–2000
- Preceded by: Srikant Pathak
- Succeeded by: Sukhada Pandey
- Constituency: Buxar

Personal details
- Born: 1965 (age 60–61)
- Party: Communist Party of India (Marxist-Leninist) Liberation (from 2020); CPIM (1986-2020)
- Spouse: Ramdeo Verma

Manju Prakash is an Indian politician, belonging to the Communist Party of India (Marxist). She served as a member of the Bihar Legislative Assembly for over 10 years from Buxar (Vidhan Sabha constituency). She got elected in 1990 and 1995. Her husband Ramdeo Verma also served as a member of the Bihar Legislative Assembly from Bibhutipur (Vidhan Sabha constituency). She has held the position of President of Bihar Women's Commission. After 2020, she left CPIM, and joined CPIML Liberation. Her father Jyoti Prakash was also a communist. He was a Dalit leader and was killed by upper caste Rais.

== Electoral record ==
Prakash participated in the Bihar Legislative Election representing CPI(M) from Buxar in 1985, 1990, 1995, 2000, 2010 and as an Independent from Bibhutipur in 2020. She emerged victorious in 1990 and 1995.

Notable Electoral Record
Year	Votes Polled	Percentage	Total votes	Victory Margin
1990	19,522	23.20	84,139	1,058
1995	41,757	41.27	101,178	22,507
