= Anand Mishra =

Indian politician and law enforcement officer (born 1981)

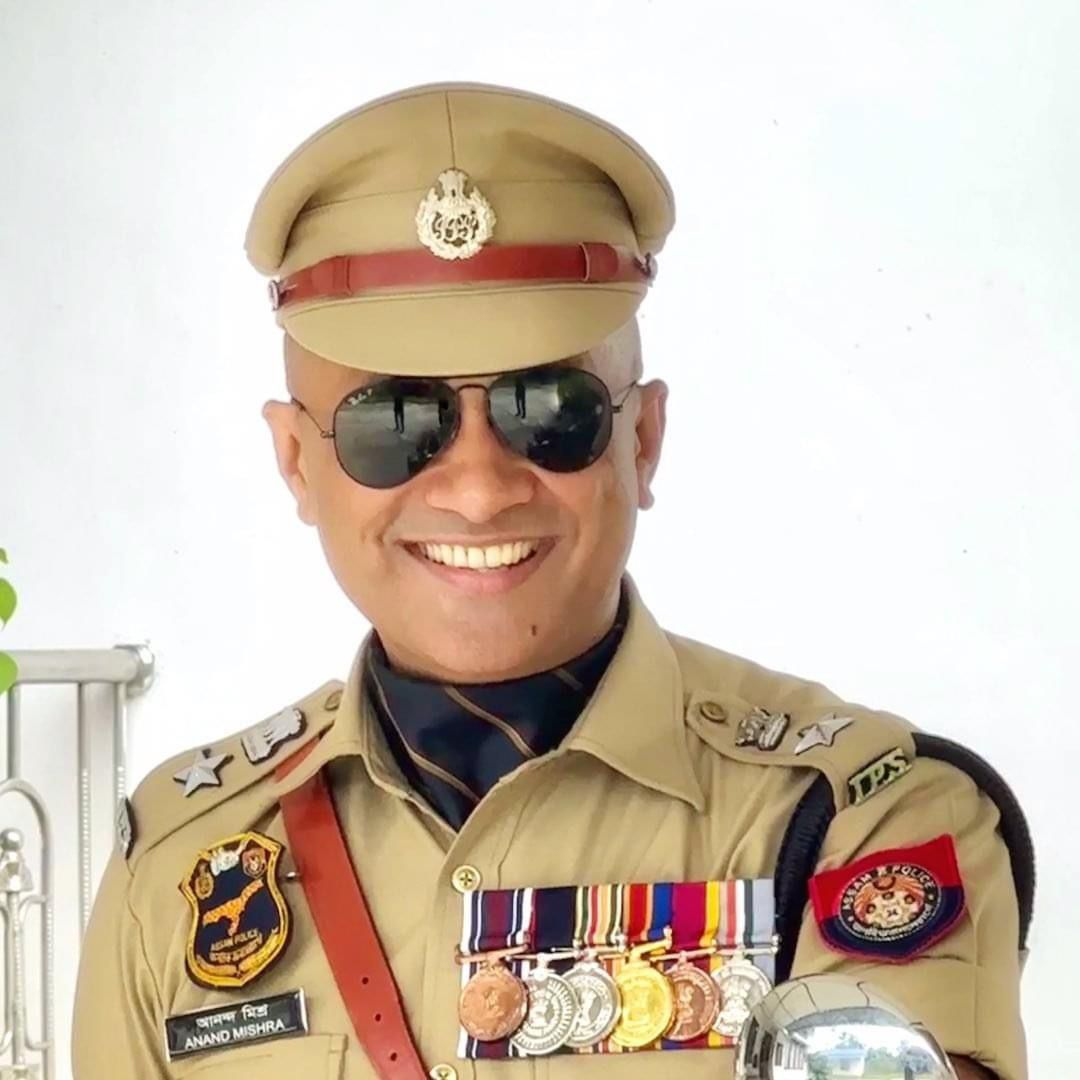

Member of the Bihar Legislative Assembly
- Incumbent
- Assumed office 2025
- Preceded by: Sanjay Kumar Tiwari
- Constituency: Buxar

Indian Police Service (IPS)
- In office 2011–2024

Personal details
- Born: Anand Mishra; June 1, 1981 (age 45) Prasaunda Village, Shahpur Block, Bhojpur District, Bihar, India
- Party: Bharatiya Janata Party
- Parent(s): Param Hans Mishra (father); Lt. Shanti Mishra (mother)
- Profession: Politician; former IPS officer
- Website: https://www.anandmishra.org/

Anand Mishra (born 1 June 1981) is an Indian politician and former Indian Police Service (IPS) officer. He was elected to the Bihar Legislative Assembly from the Buxar Assembly constituency in the 2025 election as a member of the Bharatiya Janata Party (BJP).

Mishra is a 2011-batch IPS officer of the Assam–Meghalaya cadre and served as Superintendent of Police in several districts in Assam. He resigned from service in January 2024 to enter politics.

Before joining the BJP in August 2025, he contested the 2024 Lok Sabha election from Buxar as an independent candidate.

== Early life and education ==
Mr. Mishra was born to Shri Param Hans Mishra and Lt. Shanti Mishra in a Kanyakubja Brahmin family. His ancestral family hails from Village Jigna, Itarhi, Buxar, Bihar.

Anand's father, an engineer, worked with Hindustan Motors Company near Kolkata, which shaped his early years in Hooghly district of West Bengal. He completed his matriculation from Hind Motor Education Centre and his higher secondary studies in humanities from Hind Motor High School. He later pursued Political Science (Hons.) from St. Xavier's College, Kolkata, followed by a Master's degree in Police Management from Osmania University, Hyderabad.

Alongside academics, he built diverse interests: he is a Black Belt in martial arts, a skilled guitarist, and a passionate biker.

== Police Service ==
Mr. Mishra qualified in the UPSC Civil Services Examination (2010), and joined the IPS (2011 batch). His first posting was with the Meghalaya Police, where he served in multiple roles: ASP Shillong, ASP Tura, SDPO Dadenggre, Addl. SP Jowai, Addl. SP Williamnagar, and SP Baghmara.

He played a crucial role in leading Operation Hill Storm I & II, which were instrumental in dismantling insurgency in the Garo Hills region. In 2017, he was transferred to the Assam Police, where he held key assignments: SP, Bureau of Investigation (Economic Offences), SP, Vigilance & Anti-Corruption Bureau (ACB), AIGP (Sports), Assam Police HQ, Guwahati, and SP of multiple districts including Charaideo, Dhubri, Nagaon, and Lakhimpur.

He earned a reputation as a specialist in counter-insurgency operations, anti-corruption drives, anti-mafia measures and anti-narcotics operations. He became popular on social media due to his people-centric, no-nonsense policing initiatives, which earned him the title of 'Singham', a term referencing the super cop character in Bollywood. Anand Mishra's work earned him widespread respect and numerous honors.

While serving as SSP, Lakhimpur (Assam), Mr. Mishra resigned in Jan 2024 from the IPS to go back to Bihar to pursue a larger mission of political and social transformation.

== Awards and recognition ==
His exceptional service has been recognized with several prestigious awards including the Police Medal for Gallantry (President's Medal), Chief Minister's Medal for Outstanding Services (Government of Assam), Police Antarik Suraksha Seva Padak (MHA, GOI), Special Duty Medal (NE) (MHA, GOI), and multiple commendations from Directors General of Police of Meghalaya and Assam. He was also featured among the Top 50 Police Officers in India by Fame magazine.
