= Suryakant Paswan =

Indian politician

Member of the Bihar Legislative Assembly
- In office 2020–2025
- Preceded by: Upendra Paswan
- Succeeded by: Sanjay Kumar Paswan
- Constituency: Bakhri

Secretary of All India Dalit Rights Movement
- Incumbent
- Assumed office December 2021
- Preceded by: position established

Personal details
- Party: Communist Party of India

Suryakant Paswan is an Indian politician from Bihar, leader of Communist Party of India and a Member of the Bihar Legislative Assembly. He won the Bakhri Assembly constituency in the 2020 Bihar Legislative Assembly election. Also he is the National secretary of All India Dalit Rights Movement.
