= Buxar Assembly constituency =

Constituency of the Bihar legislative assembly in India

- Constituency No. 200 - for the Bihar Legislative Assembly

Constituency details
- Country: India
- Region: East India
- State: Bihar
- District: Buxar
- Established: 1951
- Total electors: 288,128

Member of Legislative Assembly
- 18th Bihar Legislative Assembly
- Incumbent Anand Mishra
- Party: BJP
- Alliance: NDA
- Elected year: 2025

Buxar Assembly constituency is one of the 243 assembly constituencies of Bihar Vidhan Sabha. It comes under Buxar (Lok Sabha constituency) for parliamentary elections. In 2015 Bihar Legislative Assembly election, Buxar will be one of the 36 seats to have VVPAT enabled electronic voting machines.

== Parts ==
This constituency includes Buxar and Chausa blocks of Buxar district.

== Members of the Legislative Assembly ==
Year	Name	Party
1952	Lakshmi Kant Tiwari	Indian National Congress
1957	Sheokumar Thakur	Indian National Congress
1962	Jagnarain Trivedi	Indian National Congress
1967	P. Chatterjee	Samyukta Socialist Party
1969	Jagnarain Trivedi	Indian National Congress
1972	Jagnarain Trivedi	Indian National Congress
1977	Jagnarain Trivedi	Indian National Congress
1980	Jagnarain Trivedi	Indian National Congress
1985	Srikant Pathak	Indian National Congress
1990	Manju Prakash	Communist Party of India (Marxist)
1995	Manju Prakash	Communist Party of India (Marxist)
2000	Sukhada Pandey	Bharatiya Janata Party
2005	Sukhada Pandey	Bharatiya Janata Party
2005	Hriday Narayan Singh	Bahujan Samaj Party
2010	Sukhada Pandey	Bharatiya Janata Party
2015	Sanjay Tiwari	Indian National Congress
2020	Sanjay Tiwari	Indian National Congress
2025	Anand Mishra	Bharatiya Janata Party

== Election results ==
=== 2025 ===
2025 Bihar Legislative Assembly election: Buxar
Party	Candidate	Votes	%	±%
BJP	Anand Mishra	84,901	45.01	+11.02
INC	Sanjay Kumar Tiwari	56,548	29.98	−6.4
BSP	Abhimanyu Kushwaha	29,118	15.44	
JSP	Tathagat Harsh Vardhan	7,920	4.2	
NOTA	None of the above	1,356	0.72	−1.5
Majority		28,353	15.03	+12.64
Turnout		188,618	65.46	+9.14
BJP gain from INC		Swing		

=== 2020 ===
Bihar Assembly election, 2020: Buxar
Party	Candidate	Votes	%	±%
INC	Sanjay Kumar Tiwari	59,417	36.38	−5.05
BJP	Parshuram Chaubey	55,525	33.99	−1.1
RLSP	Nirmal Kumar Singh	30,489	18.67	
Independent	Aakash Kumar Singh	5,794	3.55	
NOTA	None of the above	3,630	2.22	+1.6
Majority		3,892	2.39	−3.95
Turnout		163,340	56.32	−1.48
INC hold		Swing	INC Hold	

=== 2015 ===
2015 Bihar Legislative Assembly election: Buxar
Party	Candidate	Votes	%	±%
INC	Sanjay Kumar Tiwari	66,527	41.43	
BJP	Pradeep Dubey	56,346	35.09	
BSP	Saroj Kumar Rajbhar	15,298	9.53	
CPI	Bhagwati Prasad Srivastva	2,786	1.73	
Independent	Ashok Kumar Singh	2,491	1.55	
Independent	Manoj Kumar Singh	1,738	1.08	
Independent	Aravind Kumar Pandey	1,512	0.94	
SS	Ramesar Noniya	1,473	0.92	
NOTA	None of the above	998	0.62	
Majority		10,181	6.34	
Turnout		160,594	57.8	
