= Sukhada Pandey =

Indian politician

Cabinet Minister Government of Bihar
- In office 26 November 2010 – 16 June 2013
- Ministry: Term
- Minister of Art, Culture& Youth Affairs: 26 November 2010 - 16 June 2013

Member of Bihar Legislative Assembly
- In office 2010–2015
- Preceded by: Hriday Narayan Singh
- Succeeded by: Sanjay Kumar Tiwari
- Constituency: Buxar
- In office 2000–2005
- Preceded by: Manju Prakash
- Succeeded by: Hriday Narayan Singh
- Constituency: Buxar

Personal details
- Party: Bharatiya Janata Party

Sukhada Pandey is a leader of the Bharatiya Janata Party and minister of Youth Art And Culture in the Government of Bihar in India. She is also the vice-president of the national party.

She is the retired principal of Magadh Mahila College (Patna University).
