= Harsidhi Assembly constituency =

Coordinates: 26°42′36″N 84°44′48″E

Harsidhi
- Constituency No. 13 for the Bihar Legislative Assembly

Constituency details
- Country: India
- Region: East India
- State: Bihar
- District: East Champaran
- Lok Sabha constituency: Purvi Champaran
- Established: 1951
- Total electors: 274,415
- Reservation: SC

Member of Legislative Assembly
- 18th Bihar Legislative Assembly
- Incumbent Krishnanandan Paswan
- Party: BJP
- Alliance: NDA
- Elected year: 2025
- Preceded by: Rajendra Kumar Ram

Harsidhi is an assembly constituency in East Champaran district in the Indian state of Bihar. It is reserved for scheduled castes.

== Overview ==
As per orders of Delimitation of Parliamentary and Assembly constituencies Order, 2008, 13. Harsidhi Assembly constituency (SC) is composed of the following: Harsidhi and Turkaulia community development blocks.

Harsidhi Assembly constituency is part of 3. Purvi Champaran (Lok Sabha constituency). It was formerly part of Motihari (Lok Sabha constituency).

== Members of the Legislative Assembly ==
Year	Name	Party
1952	Haribansh Sahai	Indian National Congress
1957	Parabati Devi	Indian National Congress
1962	Nageshwar Dutt Pathak	Indian National Congress
1967	S. M. Abdulla	Communist Party of India
1969	Nageshwar Dutt Pathak	Indian National Congress
1972	Hidaytullah Khan	Indian National Congress (O)
1977	Yagul Kishore Prasad Singh	Janata Party
1980	Hidaytullah Khan	Indian National Congress (I)
1985	Hidaytullah Khan	Indian National Congress
1990	Hidaytullah Khan	Indian National Congress
1995	Awadhesh Kushwaha	Janata Dal
2000	Maheshwar Singh	Samata Party
2005	Awadhesh Kushwaha	Lok Janshakti Party
2005	Maheshwar Singh	Lok Janshakti Party
2010	Krishnanandan Paswan	Bharatiya Janata Party
2015	Rajendra Kumar Ram	Rashtriya Janata Dal
2020	Krishnanandan Paswan	Bharatiya Janata Party
2025	Krishnanandan Paswan	Bharatiya Janata Party

== Election results ==
=== 2025 ===
2025 Bihar Legislative Assembly election: Harsidhi
Party	Candidate	Votes	%	±%
BJP	Krishnanandan Paswan	96,864	47.74	−1.97
RJD	Rajendra Kumar Ram	89,769	44.24	+3.74
JSP	Awadhesh Kumar	9,568	4.72	
Independent	Rajendra Paswan	2,100	1.03	
NOTA	None of the above	3,146	1.55	−0.18
Majority		7,095	3.5	−5.71
Turnout		202,899	73.94	+10.41
BJP hold		Swing		

=== 2020 ===
2020 Bihar Legislative Assembly election: Harsidhi
Party	Candidate	Votes	%	±%
BJP	Krishnanandan Paswan	84,615	49.71	+6.64
RJD	Nagendra Kumar	68,930	40.5	−9.37
RLSP	Ramesh Kumar	10,523	6.18	
Independent	Dinesh Kumar Chaudhary	1,674	0.98	
NOTA	None of the above	2,938	1.73	−0.35
Majority		15,685	9.21	+2.41
Turnout		170,205	63.53	−0.68
BJP gain from RJD		Swing	BJP	

=== 2015 ===
2015 Bihar Legislative Assembly election: Harsidhi
Party	Candidate	Votes	%	±%
RJD	Rajendra Kumar Ram	75,203	49.87	
BJP	Krishnanandan Paswan	64,936	43.07	
CPI	Vidya Sagar Arya	2,867	1.9	
Independent	Avdhesh Ram	2,138	1.42	
NOTA	None of the above	3,133	2.08	
Majority		10,267	6.8	
Turnout		150,784	64.21	
RJD gain from BJP		Swing		

=== 2010 ===
2010 Bihar Legislative Assembly election: Harsidhi
Party	Candidate	Votes	%	±%
BJP	Krishnandan Paswan	48,130	46.87	
RJD	Surendra Kumar	30,066	29.28	
INC	Vijay Kumar Ram	6,202	6.04	
Independent	Suresh Kumar	3,353	3.27	
Majority		18,064	17.59	
Turnout		102,692	54.89	
BJP gain from LJP		Swing		
