= Upendra Paswan =

Indian politician

Member of the Bihar Legislative Assembly
- In office 2015–2020
- Preceded by: Ramanand Paswan
- Succeeded by: Suryakant Paswan
- Constituency: Bakhri

Personal details
- Party: Rashtriya Janata Dal

Upendra Paswan is an Indian politician. He was elected to the Bihar Legislative Assembly from Bakhri Assembly constituency in Bihar in the 2015 Bihar Legislative Assembly election as a member of the Rashtriya Janata Dal.
