= Banka Assembly constituency =

Constituency of the Bihar legislative assembly in India

Coordinates: 24.89°N 86.92°E

Banka
- Constituency No. - for the Bihar Legislative Assembly

Constituency details
- Country: India
- Region: East India
- State: Bihar
- District: Banka
- Established: 1951
- Total electors: 260,299
- Reservation: None

Member of Legislative Assembly
- 18th Bihar Legislative Assembly
- Incumbent Ramnarayan Mandal
- Party: BJP
- Alliance: NDA
- Elected year: 2025

Banka is one of 243 constituencies of legislative assembly of Bihar. It is part of Banka Lok Sabha constituency along with other assembly constituencies viz. Amarpur, Katoria, Belhar and Dhoraiya. In 2015 Bihar Legislative Assembly election, Banka was one of the 36 seats to have VVPAT enabled electronic voting machines.

== Overview ==
Banka comprises CD Blocks Barahat & Banka.

== Members of the Legislative Assembly ==
Year	Name	Party
1952	Raghavendra Narain Singh	Indian National Congress
1957	Bindhyabasini Devi	Indian National Congress
1962	Braj Mohan Singh	Swatantra Party
1963^	Bindhyabasini Devi	Indian National Congress
1967	Babulal Mandal	Jana Sangh
1969	Kamakhya Prasad Singh	Indian National Congress
1972	Kamakhya Prasad Singh	Indian National Congress
1977	Sindheshwar Prasad Singh	Janata Party
1980	Kamakhya Prasad Singh	Indian National Congress
1985	Chandrashekhar Singh	Indian National Congress
1986^	Janardan Yadav	Bharatiya Janata Party
1990	Ramnarayan Mandal	Bharatiya Janata Party
1995	Javed Iqbal Ansari	Janata Dal
2000	Ramnarayan Mandal	Bharatiya Janata Party
2005	Javed Iqbal Ansari	Rashtriya Janata Dal
2005	Ramnarayan Mandal	Bharatiya Janata Party
2010	Javed Iqbal Ansari	Rashtriya Janata Dal
2014^	Ramnarayan Mandal	Bharatiya Janata Party
2015	Ramnarayan Mandal	Bharatiya Janata Party
2020	Ramnarayan Mandal	Bharatiya Janata Party
2025	Ramnarayan Mandal	Bharatiya Janata Party

== Election results ==
=== 2025 ===
2025 Bihar Legislative Assembly election: Banka
Party	Candidate	Votes	%	±%
BJP	Ramnarayan Mandal	95,588	49.58	+5.78
CPI	Sanjay Kumar	71,824	37.25	
JSP	Kaushal Kumar Singh	6,649	3.45	
Independent	Jawahar Kumar Jha	4,145	2.15	
Independent	Vikram Anand	2,241	1.16	
BSP	Vinod Pandit	1,784	0.93	
NOTA	None of the above	1,552	0.8	+0.12
Majority		23,764	12.33	+1.77
Turnout		192,811	74.07	+11.48
BJP hold		Swing	NDA	

=== 2020 ===
2020 Bihar Legislative Assembly election: Banka
Party	Candidate	Votes	%	±%
BJP	Ramnarayan Mandal	69,762	43.80	+5.44
RJD	Javed Iqbal Ansari	52,934	33.24	−2.39
RLSP	Kaushal Kishore Singh	10,996	6.90	
Independent	Shridhar Mandal	5,107	3.21	
Rashtriya Manav Sewa Party	Rahul Roushan	1,579	0.99	
NOTA	None of the above	1,084	0.68	−1.52
Majority		16,828	10.56	+7.83
Turnout		159,271	62.59	+4.66
BJP hold		Swing		

=== 2015 ===
Bihar Assembly election, 2015: Banka
Party	Candidate	Votes	%	±%
BJP	Ramnarayan Mandal	52,379	38.36	
RJD	Zafrul Hoda	48,649	35.63	
BSP	Ajit Kumar Singh	16,548	12.12	
Independent	Manoj Singh	5,191	3.8	
Independent	Digambar Mandal	4,071	2.98	
Independent	Makhan Yadav	2,018	1.48	
Independent	Rajendra Ray	1,579	1.16	
Bhartiya Dalit Party	Umakant Yadav	1,240	0.91	
NOTA	None of the above	3,004	2.2	
Majority		3,730	2.73	
Turnout		136,529	57.93	
