= Pipra, East Champaran Assembly constituency =

Coordinates: 26°29′17″N 84°57′54″E

Pipra
- Constituency No. 17 for the Bihar Legislative Assembly

Constituency details
- Country: India
- Region: East India
- State: Bihar
- Division: Tirhut
- District: East Champaran
- Lok Sabha constituency: Purvi Champaran
- Established: 1957
- Total electors: 256,338
- Reservation: None

Member of Legislative Assembly
- 18th Bihar Legislative Assembly
- Incumbent Shyambabu Prasad Yadav
- Party: BJP
- Alliance: NDA
- Elected year: 2025
- Preceded by: Awadhesh Prasad Kushwaha

Pipra Assembly constituency is an assembly constituency in East Champaran district in the Indian state of Bihar. It is an open seat now but was earlier reserved for Scheduled Castes.

== Related proposals ==
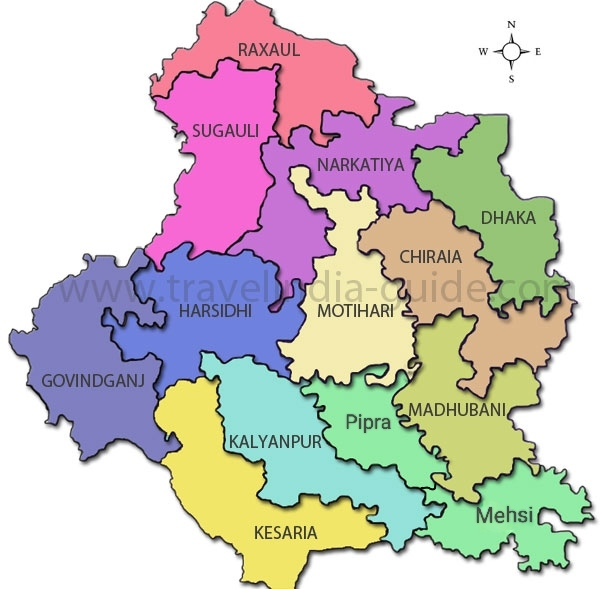
Map showing the boundaries of East Champaran Lok Sabha constituency in Bihar, India. Mehsi is a town located in East Champaran district, known for agriculture, litchi production, small-scale button industries, local trade, and cultural significance.

There have been public discussions and local-level demands in the Mehsi region for the creation of a separate Mehsi Assembly constituency, GI Tag and Mehsi Subdivision. The demand is mainly associated with Mehsi block and nearby areas, including Tetaria and Salempur blocks of East Champaran district. Supporters of the proposal argue that Mehsi has a distinct cultural and economic identity within the district, with agriculture (especially litchi production), small industries, and local trade forming an important part of its economy. They also state that administrative restructuring could improve local governance and representation.

== Overview ==
As per orders of Delimitation of Parliamentary and Assembly constituencies Order, 2008, 17. Pipra Assembly constituency is composed of the following: Mehsi, Chakia (Pipra), Tetaria community development blocks.

Pipra Assembly constituency is part of 3. Purvi Champaran (Lok Sabha constituency). It lies within the Pipra Assembly constituency (No. 17) and is located at [26°21'20" N, 85°06'58" E](https://geohack.toolforge.org/geohack.php?pagename=Mehsi,_Bihar&params=26.357696_N_85.1133_E_). Mehsi is the largest town in the constituency.

== Members of the Legislative Assembly ==
Year	Name	Party
1957	Ganga Nath Mishra	Communist Party of India
1962	Satyadeo Prasad Chaudhari	Indian National Congress
1967	Bigu Ram	Indian National Congress
1969	Bigu Ram	Indian National Congress
1972	Tulsi Ram	Communist Party of India
1977	Tulsi Ram	Communist Party of India
1980	Nand Lal Chaudhary	Indian National Congress (I)
1985	Nand Lal Chaudhary	Indian National Congress
1990	Sahdeo Paswan	Janata Dal
1995	Sahdeo Paswan	Janata Dal
2000	Surendra Kumar Chandra	Rashtriya Janata Dal
2005	Krishnanandan Paswan	Bharatiya Janata Party
2005	Krishnanandan Paswan	Bharatiya Janata Party
2010	Awadhesh Kushwaha	Janata Dal (United)
2015	Shyambabu Prasad Yadav	Bharatiya Janata Party
2020	Shyambabu Prasad Yadav	Bharatiya Janata Party
2025	Shyambabu Prasad Yadav	Bharatiya Janata Party

== Election results ==
=== 2025 ===
2025 Bihar Legislative Assembly election: Pipra
Party	Candidate	Votes	%	±%
BJP	Shyambabu Prasad Yadav	110,422	45.13	+0.95
CPI(M)	Rajmangal Prasad	99,677	40.74	+0.64
JSP	Subodh Kumar	9,487	3.88	
Independent	Rajmangal Prasad	4,872	1.99	
BSP	Bipul Kumar	4,695	1.92	
Independent	Raviranjan Kumar	4,410	1.8	
NOTA	None of the above	3,850	1.57	−1.59
Majority		10,745	4.39	+0.31
Turnout		244,657	72.75	+13.68
BJP hold		Swing		

=== 2020 ===
2020 Bihar Legislative Assembly election: Pipra (Purvi Champaran)
Party	Candidate	Votes	%	±%
BJP	Shyambabu Prasad Yadav	88,587	44.18	+6.18
CPI(M)	Rajmangal Prasad	80,410	40.1	+35.25
Independent	Awadhesh Prasad Kushwaha	6,940	3.46	
Independent	Shyam Nandan Kumar	3,694	1.84	
RLSP	Subhash Singh Kushwaha	3,243	1.62	
Rashtriya Jan Jan Party	Aniket Ranjan	2,852	1.42	
Independent	Md. Mumtaz Alam	2,185	1.09	
NOTA	None of the above	6,344	3.16	+2.32
Majority		8,177	4.08	+1.8
Turnout		200,501	59.07	+1.37
BJP hold		Swing		

=== 2015 ===
2015 Bihar Legislative Assembly election: Pipra constituency
Party	Candidate	Votes	%	±%
BJP	Shyambabu Prasad Yadav	65,552	38.0	
JD(U)	Krishna Chandra	61,622	35.72	
CPI(M)	Raj Mangal Prasad	8,366	4.85	
Independent	Arun Kumar	7,266	4.21	
Independent	Parshuram Pandey	6,139	3.56	
NCP	Subhash Chandra Gupta	3,479	2.02	
Independent	Vikram Kumar	3,126	1.81	
Garib Janta Dal (Secular)	Sadhu Yadav	2,604	1.51	
BSP	Nagendra Sahani	1,847	1.07	
Bahujan Kranti Party (Marxwad-Ambedkarwad)	Ramayan Paswan	1,661	0.96	
Sarvajan Kalyan Loktantrik Party	Ramadhar Sah	1,613	0.94	
SP	Bhagya Narayan Prasad Yadav	1,560	0.9	
NOTA	None of the above	1,454	0.84	
Majority		3,930	2.28	
Turnout		172,496	57.7	
