= Harsidhi, Bihar =

Harsidhi
- City
- Location within Bihar
- Coordinates: 26.66°N 84.71°E
- Country: India
- State: Bihar
- District: East Champaran district

Languages
  - Official: Hindi
- Time zone: UTC+5:30 (IST)
- Postal code: 845422
- Lok Sabha constituency: Motihari
- Vidhan Sabha constituency: Harsidhi (Vidhan Sabha constituency)
- Website: eastchamparan.bih.nic.in

Harsidhi is a small town and one of the 27 blocks in East Champaran district in the Indian state of Bihar. It is located 30 kilometers from the district headquarters Motihari.

== See also ==
- Harsidhi (Vidhan Sabha constituency)
