= Sanjay Kumar Tiwari =

Indian politician

Member Of Bihar Legislative Assembly
- In office 2015–2025
- Preceded by: Sukhada Pandey
- Succeeded by: Anand Mishra
- Constituency: Buxar

Personal details
- Born: Sanjay Kumar Tiwari; 14 July 1968 (age 58) Buxar, Bihar, India
- Party: Indian National Congress
- Education: A.N College, Patna

Sanjay Kumar Tiwari aka Munna Tiwari is an Indian politician as member of Indian National Congress and ex MLA from Buxar, Bihar. He was graduated from A.N. College, Patna in 1987.
