= All India Dalit Rights Movement =

Wing of Communist Party of India

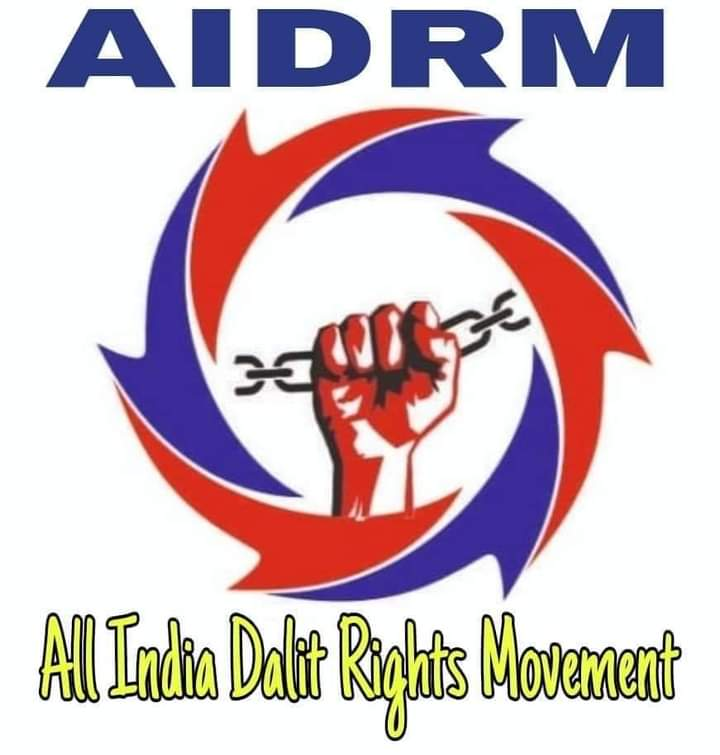
- Abbreviation: AIDRM
- Formation: 18 December 2021 (4 years ago), Aurangabad, India
- Location: India
- General Secretary: V. S. Nirmalkumar
- President: A. Ramamoorthy

All India Dalit Rights Movement is the Dalit wing of the Communist Party of India. It was formed in an all-India conference held on 18 and 19 December 2021.

== Office bearers ==
- General Secretary - V. S. Nirmalkumar
- President - A. Ramamoorthy
- Vice President - Janki Paswan, Peelingam, Mahadevgade, Karavadi Subbarao
- Secretary - N. Rajan, Suryakant Paswan
- Treasurer - Devikumari
