= Bakhri Assembly constituency =

Coordinates: 25°35′25″N 86°15′54″E

Bakhri
- Constituency No. 147 for the Bihar Legislative Assembly

Constituency details
- Country: India
- Region: East India
- State: Bihar
- District: Begusarai
- Lok Sabha constituency: Begusarai Lok Sabha
- Established: 1951
- Total electors: 294,566
- Reservation: SC

Member of Legislative Assembly
- 18th Bihar Legislative Assembly
- Incumbent Sanjay Kumar Paswan; Minister of Sugarcane Industries, Bihar
- Party: LJP(RV)
- Alliance: NDA
- Elected year: 2025

Bakhri is an assembly constituency in Begusarai district in the Indian state of Bihar. The seat is reserved for SC

Most successful parties from Bakhri
1. CPI (9 times) (50.0%)
2. INC (3 times) (16.7%)
3. CPI(M) (2 times) (11.1%)
4. RJD (2 times) (11.1%)
5. BJP (1 time) (5.56%)
6. LJP(RV) (1 time) (5.56%)

== Overview ==
As per Delimitation of Parliamentary and Assembly constituencies Order, 2008, No. 147 Bakhri Assembly constituency is composed of the following: Bakhri, Dandari and Garhpura community development blocks; Pahsara(East), Nawkothi, Hasanpur Bagar, Rajakpur, Bishnupur, Samsa & Dafarpur gram panchayats of Naokothi CD Block.

Bakhri Assembly constituency is part of No. 24 Begusarai (Lok Sabha constituency).

== Members of the Legislative Assembly ==
Year	Member	Party
1952	Shivbrat Narain Sinha	Indian National Congress
1957	Shivbrat Narain Sinha	Indian National Congress
1962	Medni Paswan	Indian National Congress
1967	Yugal Kishore Sharma	Communist Party of India (Marxist)
1969	Yugal Kishore Sharma	Communist Party of India (Marxist)
1972	Ram Chandra Paswan	Communist Party of India
1977	Ram Chandra Paswan	Communist Party of India
1980	Ram Chandra Paswan	Communist Party of India
1985	Ram Binod Paswan	Communist Party of India
1990	Ram Binod Paswan	Communist Party of India
1995	Ram Binod Paswan	Communist Party of India
2000	Ramanand Ram	Rashtriya Janata Dal
2005	Ram Binod Paswan	Communist Party of India
2005	Ram Binod Paswan	Communist Party of India
2010	Ramanand Ram	Bharatiya Janata Party
2015	Upendra Paswan	Rashtriya Janata Dal
2020	Suryakant Paswan	Communist Party of India
2025	Sanjay Kumar Paswan	Lok Janshakti Party (Ram Vilas)

== Election results ==
=== 2025 ===
Bihar Legislative Assembly Election, 2025: Bakhri
Party	Candidate	Votes	%	±%
LJP(RV)	Sanjay Kumar Paswan	98,511	47.67	
CPI	Suryakant Paswan	81,193	39.29	−4.85
JSP	Sanjay Kumar Paswan	11,529	5.58	
Independent	Sanjiv Kumar Paswan	2,968	1.44	
RLJP	Nira Devi	2,450	1.19	
Independent	Gautam Sada	2,221	1.07	
Rashtriya Suraksha Party	Rajesh Kumar	2,060	1.0	
NOTA	None of the above	3,673	1.78	+0.37
Majority		17,318	8.38	+7.91
Turnout		206,637	70.15	+9.8
LJP(RV) gain from CPI		Swing		

=== 2020 ===
Bihar Assembly election, 2020: Bakhri
Party	Candidate	Votes	%	±%
CPI	Suryakant Paswan	72,177	44.14	+24.35
BJP	Ramshankar Paswan	71,400	43.67	+21.71
RLSP	Vijay Paswan	3,857	2.36	
Independent	Rajesh Kumar Rajak	2,454	1.5	
Rashtriya Jan Vikas Party	Satya Prakash	2,395	1.46	
Shoshit Samaj Dal	Tulsi Tanti	2,094	1.28	
JAP(L)	Ramanand Ram	1,946	1.19	+0.09
NOTA	None of the above	2,313	1.41	−1.25
Majority		777	0.47	−26.83
Turnout		163,507	60.35	+0.67
CPI gain from RJD		Swing	0.47%	

=== 2015 ===
2015 Bihar Legislative Assembly election: Bakhri constituency
Party	Candidate	Votes	%	±%
RJD	Upendra Paswan	72,632	49.26	
BJP	Ramadan Ram	32,376	21.96	
CPI	Suryakant Paswan	29,185	19.79	
NOTA	n/a	3,922	2.66	
Bhartiya Janhit Dal	Suresh Sada	1,710	1.16	
BSP	Vinod Kumar Das	1,694	1.15	
JAP(L)	Daso Paswan	1,619	1.1	
Independent	Vaijanath Paswan	1,562	1.06	
Independent	Surendra Paswan	1,451	0.98	
NOTA	None of the above	3,922	2.66	
Majority		40,256	27.3	
Turnout		147,461	59.68	
RJD gain from BJP		Swing	{{{swing}}}	
