= Ramnarayan Mandal =

Indian politician

Minister of Revenue & Land Reforms Government of Bihar
- In office 29 July 2017 – 16 November 2020
- Chief Minister: Nitish Kumar
- Preceded by: Madan Mohan Jha
- Succeeded by: Ram Surat Kumar

Minister of Animal Husbandry & Fish Resources Government of Bihar
- In office 13 April 2008 – 26 November 2010
- Chief Minister: Nitish Kumar
- Preceded by: Sushil Kumar Modi
- Succeeded by: Giriraj Singh

Member of Bihar Legislative Assembly
- Incumbent
- Assumed office 2014
- Preceded by: Javed Iqbal Ansari
- Constituency: Banka
- In office 2000–2010
- Preceded by: Javed Iqbal Ansari
- Succeeded by: Javed Iqbal Ansari
- Constituency: Banka
- In office 1990–1995
- Preceded by: Janardan Yadav
- Succeeded by: Javed Iqbal Ansari
- Constituency: Banka

Personal details
- Born: Ramnarayan Mandal; 15 July 1953 (age 72)
- Party: Bharatiya Janata Party

Ramnarayan Mandal is the member of the Bihar Legislative Assembly from Banka constituency. He is a leader of Bhartiya Janta Party.

He has earlier served as a Minister of Revenue & Land Reforms in Bihar's Nitish Government Cabinet.

He was elected MLA for the first time in 1990. He won the Banka assembly seat for the 5th time in 2015.
