= Bijay Kumar Singh (Indian politician) =

Indian politician

Member of the Bihar Legislative Council
- Incumbent
- Assumed office April 2022
- Constituency: Local Bodies, Bhagalpur & Banka

Personal details
- Political party: Janata Dal United
- Parent: Srimohan Singh
- Profession: Social Service

Bijay Kumar Singh is an Indian politician, currently a member of Janata Dal (United) and a member of Bihar Legislative Council.
