= Awadhesh Prasad Kushwaha =

Indian politician

Awadhesh Prasad Kushwaha is an Indian politician from Bihar. He was a leader of Janata Dal (United). He served as a minister in the Nitish Kumar ministry as Excise Minister until October 2015.

Kushwaha won the Pipra, East Champaran Assembly constituency in the 2010 Bihar Legislative Assembly election representing the Janata Dal (United). He polled 40,099 votes and defeated his nearest rival, Subhodh Yadav of the Rashtriya Janata Dal (RJD), by a margin of 11,887 votes. In October 2015, he was caught in a sting action taking a bribe and quit his post as a minister.
