= 2015 Bihar Legislative Assembly election =

Election in India

- 12 October 2015 – 5 November 2015

All 243 seats of the Bihar Legislative Assembly 122 seats needed for a majority
- Turnout: 56.91% (▲4.18%)
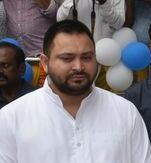

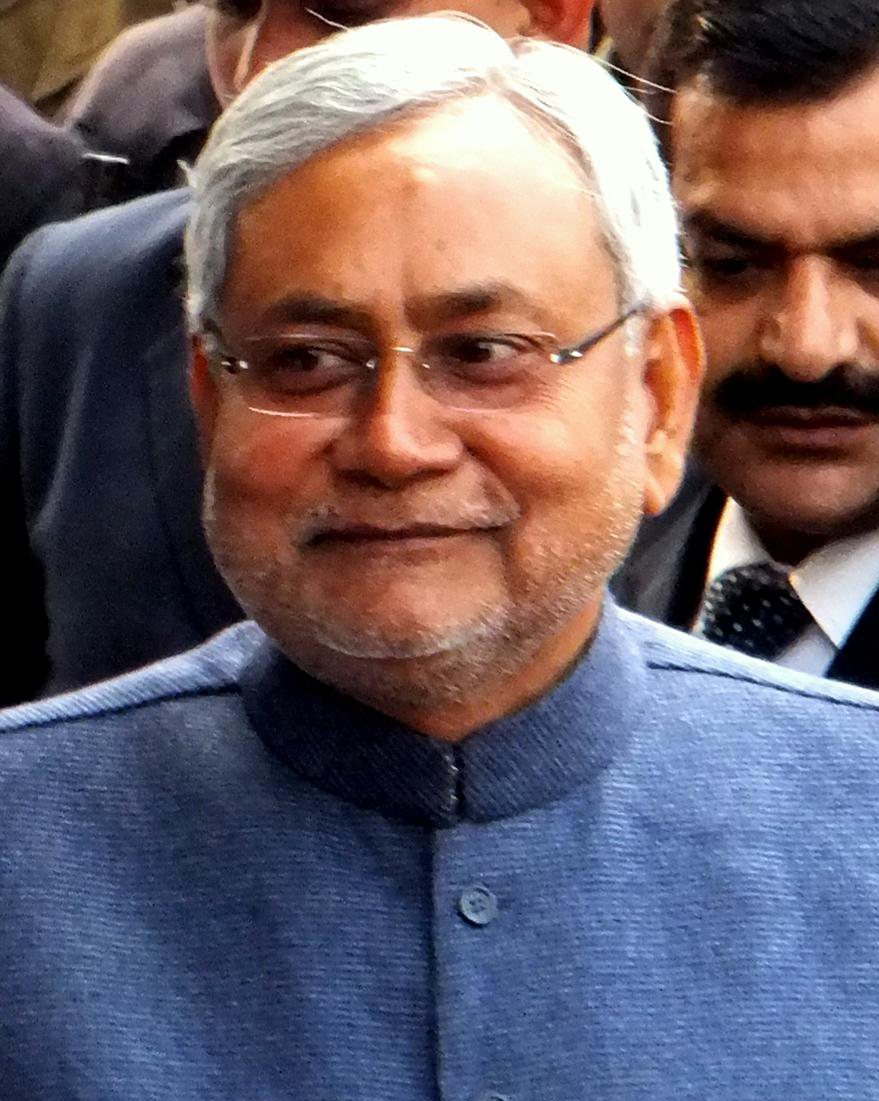

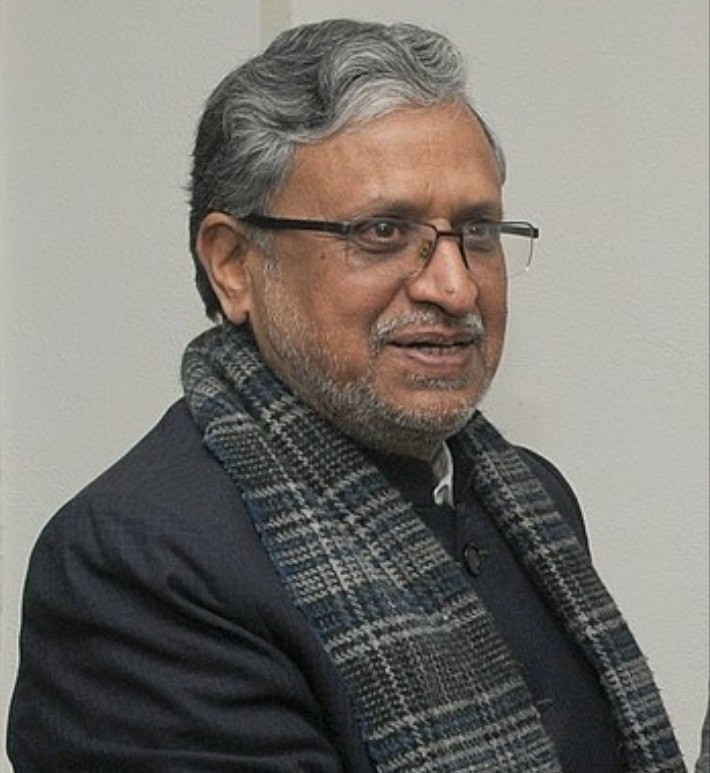

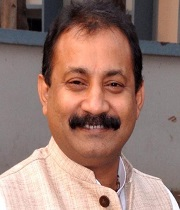
	Majority party	Minority party	Third party
Leader	Tejashwi Yadav	Nitish Kumar	Sushil Kumar Modi
Party	RJD	JD(U)	BJP
Alliance	MGB	MGB	NDA
Leader since	2015	2005	2005
Leader's seat	Raghopur	MLC(didn't contested)	MLC
Last election	22	115	91
Seats won	80	71	53
Seat change	▲58	▼44	▼38
Popular vote	69,95,509	64,16,414	93,08,015
Percentage	18.4%	16.8%	24.4%
Swing	▼0.44%	▼5.81%	▲7.94%
	Fourth party
Leader	Ashok Chaudhary
Party	INC
Alliance	MGB
Last election	4
Seats won	27
Seat change	▲23
Popular vote	2,539,638
Percentage	6.7%
Swing	▼1.68%

Chief Minister before election
Nitish Kumar
JD(U)
Elected Chief Minister
Nitish Kumar
JD(U)

The Legislative Assembly election was held over five phases in the Indian state of Bihar through October–November 2015 before the end of the tenure of the prior Bihar Legislative Assembly on 29 November 2015.

In April 2015, the Janata Parivar Alliance group (a group of six parties – Samajwadi Party, Janata Dal (United), Rashtriya Janata Dal, Janata Dal (Secular), Indian National Lok Dal and Samajwadi Janata Party (Rashtriya)) announced their intention to fight the election, with Nitish Kumar as their Chief Ministerial candidate. The Janta Parivar was joined by the Muslim League and the Nationalist Congress Party. This coalition was restructured as Mahagatabandhan when the Samajwadi party , Janata Dal (Secular), Indian National Lok Dal and Samajwadi Janata Party (Rashtriya) departed from the Janata Parivar Alliance.

The Bharatiya Janata Party-led NDA fought the election alongside the Lok Janshakti Party, the Rashtriya Lok Samata Party and Hindustani Awam Morcha.

Six left parties fought jointly, independently from both of the two main blocs.

This election saw the highest voter turnout in Bihar assembly polls since 2000, with a 56.8% voter turnout in this election. The Mahagathbandhan (Grand Alliance) of RJD, JD(U), and INC won a decisive majority with 178 seats. Rashtriya Janata Dal (RJD) emerged as the single largest party with 80 seats, followed by JD(U) with 71 seats, and Congress with 27 seats. The National Democratic Alliance (NDA) secured a total of 58 seats, of which the Bharatiya Janata Party (BJP) won 53. In terms of vote share, the BJP secured the highest share with 24.4%, followed by the RJD with 18.4% and the JD(U) with 16.8%. The Congress obtained 6.7%.

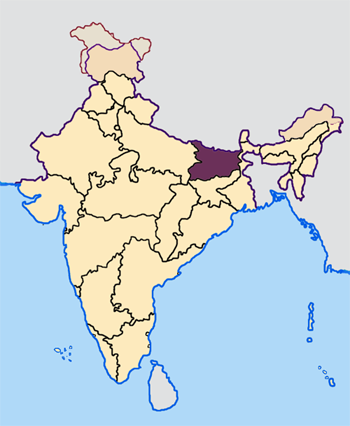
Bihar

== Background ==
=== Electoral process changes ===
NOTA symbol

Election Commission of India announced that around 1,000 Voter-verified paper audit trail (VVPAT) machines will be used along with EVM in 36 out of the 243 assembly seats in Bihar elections, spread over 38 districts. ECIL manufactured VVPATs will be used in 10 assembly constituencies, while BEL manufactured VVPAT will be used in 26 assembly constituencies. The election information was webcast for the first time and voters can locate their polling booth on phones via an app. About 1.5 crore voters would be informed about the voting dates via SMS.

Election Commission used three new software products – Suvidha, Samadhan and Sugam – to facilitate campaigning, public grievance redressal and vehicle management in Bihar. Electoral Roll Management Software helped in addition/deletion/upgradation of rolls. Android based app 'Matdan' helped the commission with poll-day monitoring in Bihar. Election Commission launched a special drive, Systematic Voters' Education And Electoral Participation (SVEEP) for voter awareness and higher voter turn out in Bihar elections. Bihar would be the first state to have photo electoral rolls, with photographs of candidates on EVMs.

Assembly constituencies of Bihar having VVPAT facility with EVMs
Katihar	Purnia	Kishanganj	Saharsa
Samastipur	Forbesganj	Munger	Jamui
Madhubani	Begusarai	Khagaria	Gopalganj
Supaul	Madhepura	Sasaram	Aurangabad
Buxar	Jehanabad	Nawada	Sitamarhi
Bhabhua	Motihari	Bettiah	Hajipur
Gaya Town	Muzaffarpur	Darbhanga	Ara
Biharsarif	Chhapra	Siwan	Kumhrar
Bankipur	Digha	Bhagalpur	Banka

Eleven NRI voters registered in the electoral rolls for the first time in Bihar electoral history. They were contacted by election officials through their family members. It was the first time that NRIs cast their votes semi-electronically from foreign countries. The e-postal ballot system and the existing proxy-voting facility is extended for NRI voters from their place of residence abroad. But this facility is not available to migrant voters within India.

A cross will be NOTA symbol to be used in this and subsequent elections. The Election Commission introduced the specific symbol for NOTA, a ballot paper with a black cross across it, on 18 September. The symbol is designed by the National Institute of Design, Ahmedabad.

On 31 July, the ECI published the final voters' list for the election, which has an overall population of 10,38,04,637, in accordance with the 2011 Census of India.

Final voters list for Bihar Legislative Assembly election 2015
S.No	Group of voters	Voters population
1	Male	3,56,46,870
2	Female	3,11,77,619
3	Third gender	2,169
–	Total voters	6,68,26,658

=== Security ===
The security used Unmanned Aerial Vehicles (UAV) drones, called Netras (eyes) for the election. The Election Commission of India decided that Bihar Police personnel would not be deployed at any of the 62,779 polling stations. They would be manned by members of the Central Armed Police Forces.

=== Bihar Legislative Council election ===
In July 2015, BJP-led NDA won 13 seats (including 1 independent backed by BJP) out of 24 seats of Bihar Legislative Council election. JDU and RJD combine won 10 seats only, while 1 seat was won by an independent candidate.

=== Central government actions ===
On 19 August, the central government notified 21 Bihar districts, including the capital Patna, as backward areas and unveiled tax rebates for them. On 25 August, the central government released the religious data of the 2011 census. Hindus constituted 82.7% (8.6 crore people) in Bihar, while Muslims constituted 16.9% (1.7 crore peoples).

In July 2015, Jitan Ram Manjhi was accorded "Z"-plus security cover by the Union Home Ministry, while Pappu Yadav was accorded "Y" category security by government of India.

=== Other political developments ===
In May 2015, the JDU government increased the Dearness Allowance (DA) by six percent to 11 percent for provincial government employees and pensioners. In July, Nitish Kumar announced a 50 percent quota for OBC, EBC and SC/STs in all government contracts up to Rs 15 lakh. In July, the government issued a notification to give caste certificates to children from upper caste Hindu and Muslim families whose annual income was below ₹1.5 lakh (US$1,600).

In September, the government agreed to the creation of a dedicated fund for fencing off temples and the inclusion of two Extremely Backward Castes (EBCs), Nishad (Mallah) and Nonia, in the SC/ST category. The state government also decided to provide grants-in-aid to 609 more madrassas across Bihar from the list of 2,459 registered by Bihar State Madrassa Education Board. The Bihar government gave a tax-exempt status to Manjhi – The Mountain Man, a film based on Dashrath Manjhi, a Dalit who carved a path through a 360 ft long, 30 ft wide and 25 ft high hillock in 22 years (1960–1982). Opposition parties accused Nitish Kumar government of doing nothing for Manjhi's village Gehlaur.

In April 2015, Nitish Kumar announced the JDU's decision to include few more castes, including the Teli, in list of Extremely Backward Class, which have 18% reservation in Bihar.

=== Caste and religion data ===
The 2011 national census indicated that Scheduled Castes constituted 16% of Bihar's 10.4 crores population. The census identified 21 of 23 Dalit sub-castes as Mahadalits. The Mahadalit community consists of the following sub-castes: Bantar, Bauri, Bhogta, Bhuiya, Chaupal, Dabgar, Dom (Dhangad), Ghasi, Halalkhor, Hari (Mehtar, Bhangi), Kanjar, Kurariar, Lalbegi, Musahar, Nat, Pan (Swasi), Rajwar, Turi, Dhobi, Chamar and Paswan (Dusadh). Among Dalits in Bihar, Chamars are the largest 31.3%, followed by Paswans (Dusadh) 30.9% and Musahars 13.9%. The Paswan caste was initially left out of the Mahadalit category, to the consternation of Ram Vilas Paswan. Chamars were included later in Mahadalit category. Adivasis (Scheduled Tribes) constituted around 1.3% of the Bihari population. They include the Gond, Santhal and Tharu communities. There are about 130 Extremely Backward Castes (EBCs) in Bihar.

Estimated population of castes of Bihar before the caste survey.
Caste By Reserve Category	Population (%)	Notes
OBC	63% ( BC-II - 27% BC-I - 36%)	Yadav – 14.2% Koeri – 4.2% Kurmis – 2.8% Baniya – 2.3% Surjapuri Muslim – 1.8% Other – 1.7 (EBCs – 36% – includes Julaha/Ansari–3.5% Teli – 3.2% )
SC	19%	includes Chamar – 5%, Dusadh – 5%, Musahar – 2.8%
EWS	15%	Shaikh – 3.8% Brahmin – 3.6% Rajput – 3.4% Bhumihar – 2.8% Pathan – 0.7% Kayasth – 0.6% Syed – 0.2%
ST	1.3%	
Others	0.4%	includes Christians, Sikhs, Jains

== Schedule ==
On 9 September, the Election Commission of India announced the dates for Bihar Assembly elections.

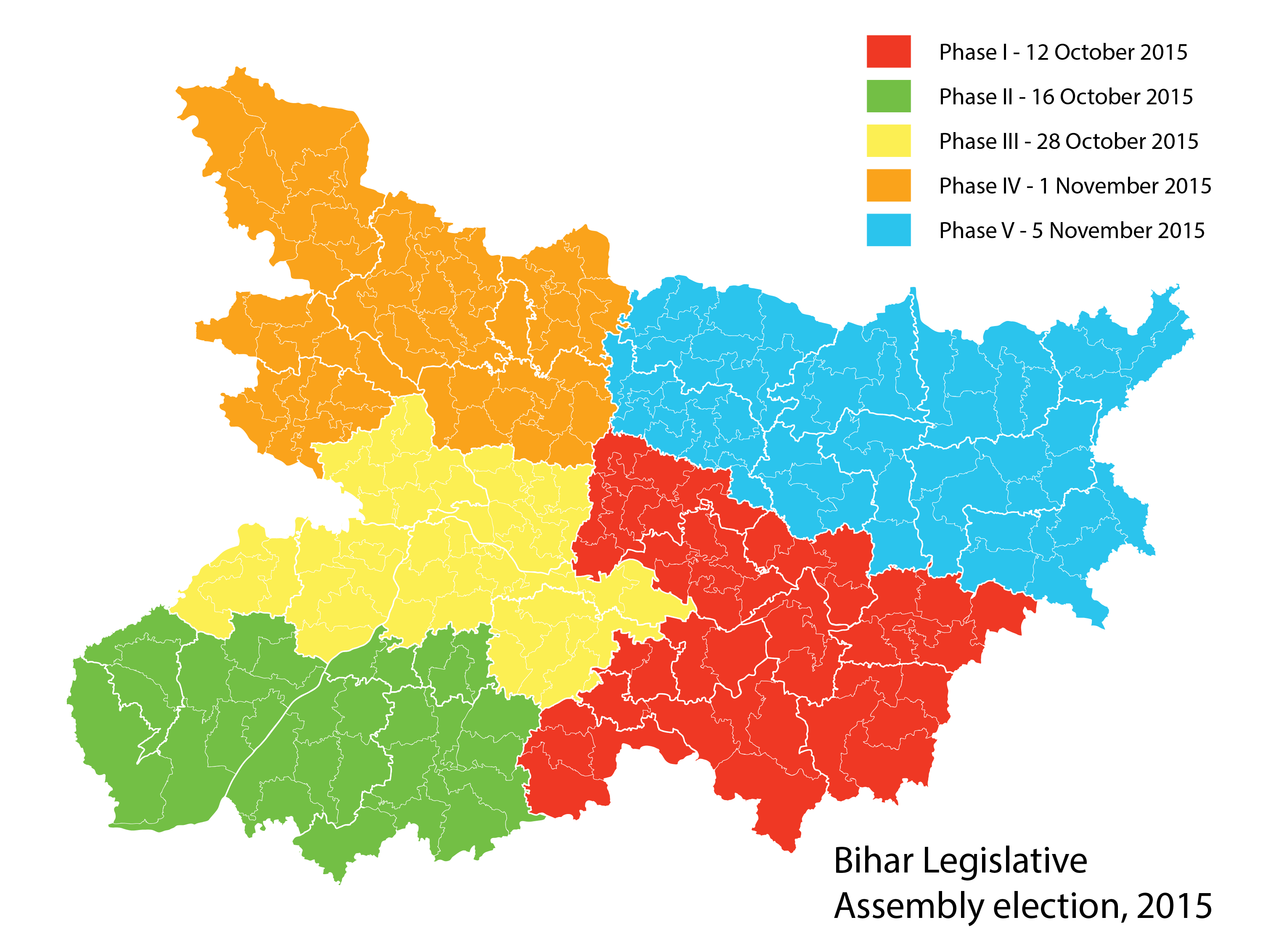
Voting phases

Phase	Date	No. of constituencies	Covering districts
I	12 October	49	Samastipur, Begusarai, Khagaria, Bhagalpur, Banka, Munger, Lakhisarai, Sheikhpura, Nawada, Jamui
II	16 October	32	Kaimur, Rohtas, Arwal, Jehanabad, Aurangabad, Gaya
III	28 October	50	Saran, Vaishali, Nalanda, Patna, Bhojpur, Buxar
IV	1 November	55	Paschim Champaran, Purvi Champaran, Sheohar, Sitamarhi, Muzaffarpur, Gopalganj, Siwan
V	5 November	57	Madhubani, Supaul, Araria, Kishanganj, Purnia, Katihar, Madhepura, Saharsa, Darbhanga
Counting	8 November	243	
Source: Election Commission of India

== Parties and alliances ==
=== Mahagathbandhan ===
Party	Flag	Symbol	Photo	Leader	Seats contested
Rashtriya Janata Dal				Lalu Prasad Yadav	101
Janata Dal (United)				Nitish Kumar	101
Indian National Congress				Ashok Chaudhary	41

On 7 June, Lalu Prasad Yadav announced the RJD was joining in an alliance with the JDU for the election. On 13 July, he led a march demanding that the central government release its findings of the Socio Economic Caste Census 2011 (SECC) on caste, although Union Minister Ram Vilas Paswan pitched for a comprehensive classification of caste data of SECC 2011 before its release, and also said Lalu, Nitish will be worst impacted from the caste data even if its released. BJP Leader Sushil Kumar Modi called for rectification of errors in the cases of 1.46 crore people in India, including 1.75 lakh in Bihar, before releasing the caste data.

On 3 August, incumbent Chief Minister Nitish Kumar declared that he would not stand in the election. On 11 August, he announced the seat-sharing formula, according to which JD(U) and RJD will contest 100 seats each, while Congress will contest 40 seats in Bihar. NCP pulled out of this alliance later. On 23 September, Nitish Kumar announced the list of 242 candidates for the JDU–RJD–INC alliance. OBCs were most favoured in the alliance ticket distribution plan. 10% of tickets were allotted to women candidate by the alliance. The Congress Vice-president Rahul Gandhi assigned the task to shortlist Congress candidates for each of the 40 assembly constituencies to former Governor of Kerala and Nagaland Nikhil Kumar.

Nitish Kumar was the declared chief ministerial candidate for the Mahagathbandhan (Grand Alliance). Kumar started his Har Ghar Dastak (door-to-door) campaign on 2 July. Initially there were definite political overtures when both Lalu Prasad Yadav and Nitish Kumar shared stage together in a public event commemorating former chief minister Satyendra Narain Sinha's birth anniversary that witnessed veiled attacks on each other, the last time they did it in public. Prashant Kishor was a key election strategist for the alliance. The Janata Dal-United started 400 audio-visual vans called Jan Bhagidari Manch raths for the campaign. Kumar is launching 'Bihar Samman Sammelan' in various cities, including Delhi and Mumbai, to connect with the Bihari diaspora.

However, the grand alliance broke on 26 July 2017 as a result of the resignation by Nitish Kumar and on the next day 27 July JD(U) made an alliance with NDA and Nitish Kumar sworn in as the chief minister of Bihar for the 6th time and Sushil Modi was sworn in as the deputy chief minister for the 3rd time.

=== National Democratic Alliance ===
2015 Bihar Legislative Assembly Election NDA Seat Sharing Map

Party	Flag	Symbol	Photo	Leader	Seats contested
Bharatiya Janata Party				Sushil Modi	157
Lok Janshakti Party				Ram Vilas Paswan	42
Rashtriya Lok Samta Party				Upendra Kushwaha	23
Hindustani Awam Morcha				Jitan Ram Manjhi	21

The Bharatiya Janata Party (BJP) used 243 GPS-monitored raths (modified Boleros) and video vans in the election. The BJP also set up a monitoring headquarters in Patna to track the movement of the GPS-equipped vehicles which will visit 40,000 villages in all 243 constituencies. The campaign was kick-started by Prime Minister Narendra Modi in Muzaffarpur on 25 July, where he also inaugurated the permanent campus of IIT Patna in Bihta. The BJP election exercise also involved three lakh volunteers. Modi held his second election rally in Gaya on 9 August and his third rally in Arrah and Saharsa on 18 August. Modi announced a Rs 1.25 lakh crore package for Bihar. He addressed his fourth rally in Bhagalpur on 1 September. Bollywood actor Ajay Devgan also campaigned for the BJP. Modi addressed several rallies after 25 October in several constituencies.

In a rally in Buxar on 26 October, Modi vowed to defend reservation of Dalits, STs, OBCs. He said of the Mahagathbandhan that it was trying to hatch a conspiracy to carve out a sub-quota on the basis of religion as the Supreme Court of India has said reservation cannot be more than 50%. On 27 October, in Bettiah, he again accused Nitish Kumar and Lalu Prasad Yadav of diluting the share of SC, ST and OBC. It promoted the view that an attempt was being made to take the reservation of Dalits and other OBCs and give it to other minorities. Union Finance Minister Arun Jaitley also agreed with Modi's assertions that the idea of reservations on the basis of religion is fraught with danger. On 1 November, Modi repeated the allegations that the two leaders came together in July 2005 to demand a review of the policy to provide for religion-based reservation. A video dating from 2005 which was leaked showed Lalu was asking for a quota for Muslims. On 3 July, BJP announced its seventh morcha, the BJP OBC Morcha, reportedly in regards to the election.

On 11 June, Jitan Ram Manjhi announced his party Hindustani Awam Morcha alliance with the NDA for the election.

On 14 September, the NDA announced its seat distribution: BJP got 160 seats, LJP got 40 seats, RLSP got 23 seats and HAM got 20 seats. The NDA did not announce any chief ministerial candidate. BJP announced the names of 154 candidates in three lists. Caste played a major role in distributing tickets. BJP also accommodated five candidates of the Hindustani Awam Morcha. Later, the BJP gave the Imamganj seat to HAM for Majhi is contesting and BJP reduced its seat tally to 159. On 1 October, the BJP released its manifesto.

=== Socialist Secular Morcha ===
On 19 September, the leaders of six parties – Samajwadi Party, Nationalist Congress Party, Jan Adhikar Party, Samras Samaj Party, National People's Party and Samajwadi Janata Dal Democratic – announced the formation of a third front known as the Socialist Secular Morcha. SP and NCP fought on most of the seats. NPP fought on 3 seats. On 15 October, NCP leader Tariq Anwar announced that his party had decided to leave the third front.

=== Left Front ===
On 24 July, the Communist Party of India, the Communist Party of India (Marxist), the Communist Party of India (Marxist-Leninist) Liberation, the All India Forward Bloc, the Socialist Unity Centre of India (Communist) and the Revolutionary Socialist Party decided to run in all constituencies on a join ticket citing its call for an alternative platform. The CPI will contest 98 seats, while the CPI-ML, CPI(M), SUCI, Forward Bloc, and RSP will contest 98, 43, 10, 9, and 3 seats, respectively. CPI released its first list of 81 candidates on 16 September 2015.

=== Others ===
==== Muslim parties ====
At least six Muslim parties contested the election. AIMIM contested six seats.

All India Majlis-e-Ittehadul Muslimeen (AIMIM) leader Asaduddin Owaisi addressed a rally in Kishanganj on 16 August. Owaisi accused Nitish and Lalu of keeping the Seemanchal region (consisting of 24 seats) as a backward region. AIMIM is contesting on 6 assembly seats in Seemanchal region where Muslim voters play a major role. He addressed a public rally in Kishanganj on 4 October in the Sontha village, which is part of the Kochadhaman Assembly constituency. He held further rallies at many places in Kishanganj and Purnia.

On 5 October, AIMIM released its first list of its six candidates for the election.

==== Bahujan Samaj Party ====
In June 2015, the Bahujan Samaj Party said it would contest all 243 seats. In July, the BSP initially released its first list of 49 candidates, including five women candidates, by Bharat Bind, the president of the BSP Bihar unit. National party leader Mayawati planned to campaign for its candidates. BSP's first list has 11 Other Backward Class (OBCs) and 11 Muslims, while they also field Dalits and OBCs from non-reserved seats. On 6 September, Mayawati said of the central government that it was being "remote-controlled" by the "communal and fascist" organisation Rashtriya Swayamsevak Sangh (RSS).

Naseemuddin Siddiqui, Munquad Ali (Rajya Sabha MP), and Ram Achal Rajbhar were appointed to form a strategy to consolidate the Dalits, Most Backward Castes (MBCs), and Muslim votes. On 9 September, Mayawati questioned the announcement of Dearness Allowance (DA) by the central government just before the election and again accused the RSS and its affiliated Sangh Parivar organizations of using the 2011 national census for fear-mongering against Muslim population growth for sectarian purposes, as well as to divert attention from such issues as the alleged failure of the central government to deliver on its promises. She added that the census also showed positive signs such as the sex ratio among Muslims is 951 females to 1,000 males, which is higher than the national average and indicated a slowing of the Muslim population growth rate. On 10 September, she called for the deployment of central forces in large numbers on electoral duty to assure a free and fair election and further asked the ECI to keep a watch on possible sectarian ploys by the BJP.

Mayawati officially launched the party's campaign on 9 October from Banka. On 13 October, addressing a rally in Rohtas and Kaimur districts, she claimed that the SP chief Mulayam Singh Yadav and the party leadership had surrendered to the BJP. She claimed that it has fielded candidates after consulting with the BJP. She further called on the NDA to not allow the reservation policy for OBCs and SC/STs to fall under the RSS' influence. On 25 October, Mayawati while addressing a rally in Buxar district of Bihar said that Samajwadi Party played in the hands of BJP due to which Nationalist Congress Party (NCP) broke away from it. She also alleged that BJP is working only for the Business class and the Nitish-Lalu governments did nothing for the poor.

==== Minor ====
Expelled RJD MP Pappu Yadav created the Jan Adhikar Party before the election and announced to fight against the Lalu-Nitish alliance. Yogendra Yadav has announced that Swaraj Abhiyan may extend its support to certain political parties, however it was not clear which one.

On 17 September, Shiv Sena announced that it will contest over 150 seats during the election. On 19 September, a third front – Socialist Secular Morcha – announced its seat distribution: SP got 85 seats, Janadhikar Party got 64 seats, NCP got 40 seats, SSP got 28 seats, SJP got 23 seats and NPP got three seats. Former U.K. banker Akshay Verma's Sarvajan Kalyan Loktantrik Party contested about 90 seats in the election.

The Aam Aadmi Party and JVM-P decided that they will not contest the election, but will campaign against the NDA.

== List of Candidates ==
District	Constituency		MGB		NDA	
District	#	Name	Party	Candidate	Party	Candidate
West Champaran	1	Valmiki Nagar	INC	Irshad Hussain	RLSP	Surendra Prasad
West Champaran	2	Ramnagar (SC)	INC	Purnmasi Ram	BJP	Bhagirathi Devi
West Champaran	3	Narkatiaganj	INC	Vinay Varma	BJP	Renu Devi
West Champaran	4	Bagaha	JD(U)	Bhishm Sahani	BJP	Raghaw Pandey
West Champaran	5	Lauriya	RJD	Ran Kaushal Pratap Singh	BJP	Vinay Bihari
West Champaran	6	Nautan	JD(U)	Baidyanath Mahto	BJP	Narayan Prasad
West Champaran	7	Chanpatia	JD(U)	N. N. Sahi	BJP	Prakash Rai
West Champaran	8	Bettiah	INC	Madan Mohan Tiwari	BJP	Renu Devi
West Champaran	9	Sikta	JD(U)	Firoj Ahmad	BJP	Dilip Varma
East Champaran	10	Raxaul	RJD	Suresh Kumar	BJP	Ajay Kumar Singh
East Champaran	11	Sugauli	RJD	Om Prakash Choudhary	BJP	Ramchandra Sahani
East Champaran	12	Narkatia	RJD	Shamim Ahmad	RLSP	Sant Singh Kushwaha
East Champaran	13	Harsidhi (SC)	RJD	Rajendra Kumar	BJP	Krishnanandan Paswan
East Champaran	14	Govindganj	INC	Brajesh Kumar	LJP	Raju Tiwari
East Champaran	15	Kesaria	RJD	Rajesh Kushwaha	BJP	Rajendra Prasad Gupta
East Champaran	16	Kalyanpur	JD(U)	Razia Khatoon	BJP	Sachindra Prasad Singh
East Champaran	17	Pipra	JD(U)	Krishan Chandra	BJP	Shyambabu Yadav
East Champaran	18	Madhuban	JD(U)	Shivajee Rai	BJP	Rana Randhir
East Champaran	19	Motihari	RJD	Binod Kumar Shrivastava	BJP	Pramod Kumar
East Champaran	20	Chiraia	RJD	Laxmi Narayan Yadav	BJP	Lal Babu Gupta
East Champaran	21	Dhaka	RJD	Faisal Rahman	BJP	Pawan Jaiswal
Sheohar	22	Sheohar	JD(U)	Sharfuddin	HAM	Labhali Anand
Sitamarhi	23	Riga	INC	Amit Kumar	BJP	Moti Lal Prasad
Sitamarhi	24	Bathnaha (SC)	INC	Surendra Ram	BJP	Dinkar Ram
Sitamarhi	25	Parihar	RJD	Ram Chandra Purve	BJP	Gayatri Devi
Sitamarhi	26	Sursand	RJD	Syed Abu Dojana	HAM	Shahid Ali Khan
Sitamarhi	27	Bajpatti	JD(U)	Ranju Geeta	RLSP	Rekha Kumari
Sitamarhi	28	Sitamarhi	RJD	Sunil Kushwaha	BJP	Sunil Pintu
Sitamarhi	29	Runnisaidpur	RJD	Mangita Devi	RLSP	Pankaj Mishra
Sitamarhi	30	Belsand	JD(U)	Sunita Singh Chauhan	LJP	Md. Nasir Ahamad
Madhubani	31	Harlakhi	INC	Md. Shabbir	RLSP	Basant Kushwaha
Madhubani	32	Benipatti	INC	Bhawana Jha	BJP	Vinod Narain Jha
Madhubani	33	Khajauli	RJD	Sitaram Yadav	BJP	Arun Shankar Prasad
Madhubani	34	Babubarhi	JD(U)	Kapil Deo Kamat	LJP	Binod Kumar Singh
Madhubani	35	Bisfi	RJD	Faiyaz Ahmad	RLSP	Manoj Kumar Yadav
Madhubani	36	Madhubani	RJD	Samir Kumar Mahaseth	BJP	Ramdeo Mahto
Madhubani	37	Rajnagar (SC)	RJD	Ramawatar Paswan	BJP	Ram Prit Paswan
Madhubani	38	Jhanjharpur	RJD	Gulab Yadav	BJP	Nitish Mishra
Madhubani	39	Phulparas	JD(U)	Guljar Devi Yadav	BJP	Ram Sundar Yadav
Madhubani	40	Laukaha	JD(U)	Lakshmeshwar Roy	BJP	Pramod K. Priyedarshi
Supaul	41	Nirmali	JD(U)	Aniruddha Prasad Yadav	BJP	Ram Kumar Roy
Supaul	42	Pipra	RJD	Yadubansh Kumar Yadav	BJP	Vishwamohan Kumar
Supaul	43	Supaul	JD(U)	Bijendra Prasad Yadav	BJP	Kishor Kumar
Supaul	44	Triveniganj (SC)	JD(U)	Veena Bharti	LJP	Anant Kumar Bharti
Supaul	45	Chhatapur	RJD	Jahur Alam	BJP	Niraj Kumar Singh
Araria	46	Narpatganj	RJD	Anil Kumar Yadav	BJP	Janardan Yadav
Araria	47	Raniganj (SC)	JD(U)	Achmit Rishidev	BJP	Ramji Das Rishidev
Araria	48	Forbesganj	RJD	Krityanand Biswas	BJP	Vidya Sagar Keshri
Araria	49	Araria	INC	Avidur Rahman	LJP	Ajay Kumar Jha
Araria	50	Jokihat	JD(U)	Sarfraz Alam	HAM	Bibi Zeba Khatun
Araria	51	Sikti	JD(U)	Shatrughan Suman	BJP	Vijay Kumar Mandal
Kishanganj	52	Bahadurganj	INC	Tauseef Alam	BJP	Awadh Bihari Singh
Kishanganj	53	Thakurganj	JD(U)	Naushad Alam	LJP	Gopal Kumar Agrawal
Kishanganj	54	Kishanganj	INC	Md. Jawed	BJP	Sweety Singh
Kishanganj	55	Kochadhaman	JD(U)	Mujahid Alam	BJP	Abdur Rahman
Purnia	56	Amour	INC	Abdul Jalil Mastan	BJP	Saba Zafar
Purnia	57	Baisi	RJD	Abdus Subhan	RLSP	Azizur Rahman
Purnia	58	Kasba	INC	Md. Afaque Alam	BJP	Pradip Kumar Das
Purnia	59	Banmankhi (SC)	RJD	Sanjiv Kumar Paswan	BJP	Krishna Kumar Rishi
Purnia	60	Rupauli	JD(U)	Bima Bharti	BJP	Prem Prakash Mandal
Purnia	61	Dhamdaha	JD(U)	Leshi Singh	RLSP	Shiv Shankar Thakur
Purnia	62	Purnia	INC	Indu Sinha	BJP	Vijay Kumar Khemka
Katihar	63	Katihar	JD(U)	Bijay Singh	BJP	Tarkishore Prasad
Katihar	64	Kadwa	INC	Shakeel Ahmad Khan	BJP	Chander Bhushan Thakur
Katihar	65	Balrampur	JD(U)	Dulal Chandra Goswami	BJP	Barun Kumar Jha
Katihar	66	Pranpur	INC	Tauquir Alam	BJP	Binod Kumar Singh
Katihar	67	Manihari (ST)	INC	Manohar Prasad Singh	LJP	Anil Kumar Oraon
Katihar	68	Barari	RJD	Neeraj Kumar	BJP	Bibhash Choudhary
Katihar	69	Korha (SC)	INC	Punam Paswan	BJP	Mahesh Paswan
Madhepura	70	Alamnagar	JD(U)	Narendra Narayan Yadav	LJP	Chandan Singh
Madhepura	71	Bihariganj	JD(U)	Niranjan Kumar Mehta	BJP	Ravindra Charan Yadav
Madhepura	72	Singheshwar (SC)	JD(U)	Ramesh Rishidev	HAM	Manju Devi
Madhepura	73	Madhepura	RJD	Chandra Shekhar	BJP	Vijay Kumar Bimal
Saharsa	74	Sonbarsha (SC)	JD(U)	Ratnesh Sada	LJP	Sarita Devi
Saharsa	75	Saharsa	RJD	Arun Kumar	BJP	Alok Ranjan
Saharsa	76	Simri Bakhtiarpur	JD(U)	Dinesh Chandra Yadav	LJP	Yusuf Salahuddin
Saharsa	77	Mahishi	RJD	Abdul Ghafoor	RLSP	Chandan Kumar Sah
Darbhanga	78	Kusheshwar Asthan (SC)	JD(U)	Shashi Bhushan Hazari	LJP	Dhananjay Kumar
Darbhanga	79	Gaura Bauram	JD(U)	Madan Sahni	LJP	Vinod Sahni
Darbhanga	80	Benipur	JD(U)	Sunil Choudhary	BJP	Gopal Jee Thakur
Darbhanga	81	Alinagar	RJD	Abdul Bari Siddiqui	BJP	Mishri Lal Yadav
Darbhanga	82	Darbhanga Rural	RJD	Lalit Kumar Yadav	HAM	Naushad Ahmad
Darbhanga	83	Darbhanga	RJD	Om Prakash Kheria	BJP	Sanjay Saraogi
Darbhanga	84	Hayaghat	JD(U)	Amarnath Gami	LJP	Ramesh Choudhary
Darbhanga	85	Bahadurpur	RJD	Bhola Yadav	BJP	Hari Sahni
Darbhanga	86	Keoti	RJD	Faraz Fatmi	BJP	Ashok Kumar Yadav
Darbhanga	87	Jale	JD(U)	Rishi Mishra	BJP	Jibesh Kumar
Muzaffarpur	88	Gaighat	RJD	Maheshwar P. Yadav	BJP	Veena Devi
Muzaffarpur	89	Aurai	RJD	Surendra Kumar	BJP	Ram Surat Rai
Muzaffarpur	90	Minapur	RJD	Munna Yadav	BJP	Ajay Kumar
Muzaffarpur	91	Bochaha (SC)	JD(U)	Ramai Ram	LJP	Anil Kumar
Muzaffarpur	92	Sakra (SC)	RJD	Lal Babu Ram	BJP	Arjun Ram
Muzaffarpur	93	Kurhani	JD(U)	Manoj Kumar Singh	BJP	Kedar Prasad Gupta
Muzaffarpur	94	Muzaffarpur	JD(U)	Bijendra Chaudhary	BJP	Suresh Kumar Sharma
Muzaffarpur	95	Kanti	RJD	Md. Parwez Alam	HAM	Ajit Kumar
Muzaffarpur	96	Baruraj	RJD	Nand Kumar Rai	BJP	Arun Kumar Singh
Muzaffarpur	97	Paroo	RJD	Shankar Prasad	BJP	Ashok Kumar Singh
Muzaffarpur	98	Sahebganj	RJD	Ram Vichar Ray	BJP	Raju Kumar Singh
Gopalganj	99	Baikunthpur	JD(U)	Manjeet Kumar Singh	BJP	Mithlesh Tiwari
Gopalganj	100	Barauli	RJD	Md. Nematullah	BJP	Rampravesh Rai
Gopalganj	101	Gopalganj	RJD	Reyazul Haque Raju	BJP	Subhash Singh
Gopalganj	102	Kuchaikote	JD(U)	Amrendra Pandey	LJP	Kali Prasad Pandey
Gopalganj	103	Bhorey (SC)	INC	Anil Kumar	BJP	Indradev Manjhi
Gopalganj	104	Hathua	JD(U)	Ramsewak Kushwaha	HAM	Mahachandra Pd. Singh
Siwan	105	Siwan	JD(U)	Bablu Prasad	BJP	Vyas Deo Prasad
Siwan	106	Ziradei	JD(U)	Ramesh Singh Kushwaha	BJP	Asha Devi
Siwan	107	Darauli (SC)	RJD	Parmatma Ram	BJP	Ramayan Manjhi
Siwan	108	Raghunathpur	RJD	Hari Shankar Yadav	BJP	Manoj Kumar Singh
Siwan	109	Daraundha	JD(U)	Kavita Singh	BJP	Jitendra Swami
Siwan	110	Barharia	JD(U)	Shyam Bahadur Singh	LJP	Bachha Panday
Siwan	111	Goriakothi	RJD	Satyadeo Prasad Singh	BJP	Devesh Kant Singh
Siwan	112	Maharajganj	JD(U)	Hemnarayan Sah	BJP	Kumar Deo Ranjan Singh
Saran	113	Ekma	JD(U)	Manoranjan Singh	BJP	Kameshwar Kumar Singh
Saran	114	Manjhi	INC	Vijay Shanker Dubey	LJP	Keshav Singh
Saran	115	Baniapur	RJD	Kedar Nath Singh	BJP	Tarkeshwar Singh
Saran	116	Taraiya	RJD	Mudrika Prasad Rai	BJP	Janak Singh
Saran	117	Marhaura	RJD	Jitendra Kumar Rai	BJP	Lal Babu Ray
Saran	118	Chapra	RJD	Randhir Kumar Singh	BJP	C. N. Gupta
Saran	119	Garkha (SC)	RJD	Muneshwar Chaudhary	BJP	Gyanchand Manjhi
Saran	120	Amnour	JD(U)	Krishna Kumar Mantoo	BJP	Shatrudhan Tiwari
Saran	121	Parsa	RJD	Chandrika Roy	LJP	Chhote Lal Ray
Saran	122	Sonepur	RJD	Ramanuj Prasad	BJP	Vinay Kumar Singh
Vaishali	123	Hajipur	INC	Jagan Nath Rai	BJP	Awadhesh Singh
Vaishali	124	Lalganj	JD(U)	Vijay Kumar Shukla	LJP	Rajkumar Sah
Vaishali	125	Vaishali	JD(U)	Raj Kishore Singh	HAM	Brishin Patel
Vaishali	126	Mahua	RJD	Tej Pratap Yadav	HAM	Ravindra Ray
Vaishali	127	Raja Pakar (SC)	RJD	Shiv Chandra Ram	LJP	Ram Nath Raman
Vaishali	128	Raghopur	RJD	Tejashwi Yadav	BJP	Satish Kumar
Vaishali	129	Mahnar	JD(U)	Umesh Kushwaha	BJP	Achyutanand Singh
Vaishali	130	Patepur (SC)	RJD	Prema Chaudhary	BJP	Mahendra Baitha
Samastipur	131	Kalyanpur (SC)	JD(U)	Maheshwar Hazari	LJP	Prince Raj
Samastipur	132	Warisnagar	JD(U)	Ashok Kumar	LJP	Chandrashekhar Rai
Samastipur	133	Samastipur	RJD	Akhtarul Islam Shahin	BJP	Renu Kushawaha
Samastipur	134	Ujiarpur	RJD	Alok Kumar Mehta	RLSP	Kumar Anant
Samastipur	135	Morwa	JD(U)	Vidya Sagar Nishad	BJP	Suresh Ray
Samastipur	136	Sarairanjan	JD(U)	Vijay Kumar Chaudhary	BJP	Ranjeet Nirguni
Samastipur	137	Mohiuddinnagar	RJD	Ejya Yadav	BJP	Satyendra Narayan Singh
Samastipur	138	Bibhutipur	JD(U)	Ram Balak Singh	LJP	Ramesh Kumar Roy
Samastipur	139	Rosera (SC)	INC	Ashok Kumar	BJP	Manju Hazari
Samastipur	140	Hasanpur	JD(U)	Raj Kumar Ray	RLSP	Vinod Choudhary
Begusarai	141	Cheria Bariarpur	JD(U)	Manju Verma	LJP	Anil Kumar Chaudhary
Begusarai	142	Bachhwara	INC	Ramdeo Rai	LJP	Arvind Kumar Singh
Begusarai	143	Teghra	RJD	Birendra Kumar	BJP	Ram Lakhan Singh
Begusarai	144	Matihani	JD(U)	Narendra Kumar Singh	BJP	Sarvesh Kumar
Begusarai	145	Sahebpur Kamal	RJD	Shreenarayan Yadav	LJP	M. D. Aslam
Begusarai	146	Begusarai	INC	Amita Bhushan	BJP	Surendra Mehta
Begusarai	147	Bakhri (SC)	RJD	Upendra Paswan	BJP	Ramanand Ram
Khagaria	148	Alauli (SC)	RJD	Chandan Kumar	LJP	Pashupati Kumar Paras
Khagaria	149	Khagaria	JD(U)	Poonam Devi Yadav	HAM	Rajesh Kumar
Khagaria	150	Beldaur	JD(U)	Panna Lal Singh	LJP	Mithilesh Kumar Nishad
Khagaria	151	Parbatta	JD(U)	Ramanand Prasad Singh	BJP	Ramanuj Choudhary
Bhagalpur	152	Bihpur	RJD	Varsha Rani	BJP	Kumar Shailendra
Bhagalpur	153	Gopalpur	JD(U)	Gopal Mandal	BJP	Anil Kumar Yadav
Bhagalpur	154	Pirpainti (SC)	RJD	Ram Vilash Paswan	BJP	Lalan Kumar
Bhagalpur	155	Kahalgaon	INC	Sadanand Singh	LJP	Niraj Kumar Mandal
Bhagalpur	156	Bhagalpur	INC	Ajit Sharma	BJP	Arjit Shashwat Choubey
Bhagalpur	157	Sultanganj	JD(U)	Subodh Roy	RLSP	Himanshu Prasad
Bhagalpur	158	Nathnagar	JD(U)	Ajay Kumar Mandal	LJP	Amar Nath Prasad
Banka	159	Amarpur	JD(U)	Janardan Manjhi	BJP	Mrinal Shekhar
Banka	160	Dhauraiya (SC)	JD(U)	Manish Kumar	RLSP	Bhudeo Choudhary
Banka	161	Banka	RJD	Zafrul Hoda	BJP	Ramnarayan Mandal
Banka	162	Katoria (ST)	RJD	Sweety Sima Hembram	BJP	Nikki Hembrom
Banka	163	Belhar	JD(U)	Giridhari Yadav	BJP	Manoj Yadav
Munger	164	Tarapur	JD(U)	Mewalal Chaudhary	HAM	Shakuni Choudhary
Munger	165	Munger	RJD	Vijay Kumar Yadav	BJP	Pranav Kumar
Munger	166	Jamalpur	JD(U)	Shailesh Kumar	LJP	Himanshu Kunvar
Lakhisarai	167	Suryagarha	RJD	Prahlad Yadav	BJP	Prem Ranjan Patel
Lakhisarai	168	Lakhisarai	JD(U)	Ramanand Mandal	BJP	Vijay Kumar Sinha
Sheikhpura	169	Sheikhpura	JD(U)	Randhir Kumar Soni	HAM	Naresh Saw
Sheikhpura	170	Barbigha	INC	Sudarshan Kumar	RLSP	Sheo Kumar
Nalanda	171	Asthawan	JD(U)	Jitendra Kumar	LJP	Chhote Lal Yadav
Nalanda	172	Biharsharif	JD(U)	Md. Asghar Shamim	BJP	Sunil Kumar
Nalanda	173	Rajgir (SC)	JD(U)	Ravi Jyoti Kumar	BJP	Satyadev Narayan Arya
Nalanda	174	Islampur	JD(U)	Chandrasen Prasad	BJP	Birendra Gope
Nalanda	175	Hilsa	RJD	Shakti Singh Yadav	LJP	Deepika Kumari
Nalanda	176	Nalanda	JD(U)	Shrawan Kumar	BJP	Kaushlendra Kumar
Nalanda	177	Harnaut	JD(U)	Hari Narayan Singh	LJP	Arun Kumar
Patna	178	Mokama	JD(U)	Neeraj Kumar	LJP	Kanhaiya Kumar Singh
Patna	179	Barh	JD(U)	Manoj Kumar	BJP	Gyanendra Kumar Singh
Patna	180	Bakhtiarpur	RJD	Aniruddh Kumar	BJP	Ranvijay Singh
Patna	181	Digha	JD(U)	Rajeev Ranjan Prasad	BJP	Sanjiv Chaurasiya
Patna	182	Bankipur	INC	Ashish Kumar	BJP	Nitin Nabin
Patna	183	Kumhrar	INC	Aquil Haider	BJP	Arun Kumar Sinha
Patna	184	Patna Sahib	RJD	Santosh Mehta	BJP	Nand Kishore Yadav
Patna	185	Fatuha	RJD	Rama Nand Yadav	LJP	Satyendra Kumar Singh
Patna	186	Danapur	RJD	Raj Kishor Yadav	BJP	Asha Devi Sinha
Patna	187	Maner	RJD	Virendra Yadav	BJP	Srikant Nirala
Patna	188	Phulwari (SC)	JD(U)	Shyam Rajak	HAM	Rajeshwar Manjhi
Patna	189	Masaurhi (SC)	RJD	Rekha Devi	HAM	Nutan Paswan
Patna	190	Paliganj	RJD	Jai Vardhan Yadav	BJP	Ram Janm Sharma
Patna	191	Bikram	INC	Siddharth Saurav	BJP	Anil Kumar
Bhojpur	192	Sandesh	RJD	Arun Kumar Yadav	BJP	Sanjay Singh Tiger
Bhojpur	193	Barhara	RJD	Saroj Yadav	BJP	Aasha Devi
Bhojpur	194	Arrah	RJD	Md. Nawaz Alam	BJP	Amrendra Pratap Singh
Bhojpur	195	Agiaon (SC)	JD(U)	Prabhunath Prasad	BJP	Shivesh Kumar
Bhojpur	196	Tarari	INC	Akhilesh Prasad Singh	LJP	Gita Pandey
Bhojpur	197	Jagdishpur	RJD	Ram Vishun Singh	RLSP	Rakesh Raushan
Bhojpur	198	Shahpur	RJD	Rahul Tiwari	BJP	Visheshwar Ojha
Buxar	199	Brahampur	RJD	Shambhu Nath Yadav	BJP	Vivek Thakur
Buxar	200	Buxar	INC	Sanjay Kumar Tiwari	BJP	Pradeep Dubey
Buxar	201	Dumraon	JD(U)	Dadan Pahalwan	RLSP	Ram Bihari Singh
Buxar	202	Rajpur (SC)	JD(U)	Santosh Kumar Nirala	BJP	Bishawnath Ram
Kaimur	203	Ramgarh	RJD	Ambika Singh Yadav	BJP	Ashok Kumar Singh
Kaimur	204	Mohania (SC)	INC	Sanjay Kumar	BJP	Niranjan Ram
Kaimur	205	Bhabua	JD(U)	Pramod Kumar Singh	BJP	Anand Bhushan Pandey
Kaimur	206	Chainpur	JD(U)	Mahabali Singh	BJP	Brij Kishor Bind
Rohtas	207	Chenari (SC)	INC	Mangal Ram	RLSP	Lalan Paswan
Rohtas	208	Sasaram	RJD	Ashok Kushwaha	BJP	Jawahar Prasad
Rohtas	209	Kargahar	JD(U)	Bashisth Singh	RLSP	Birendra Kumar Singh
Rohtas	210	Dinara	JD(U)	Jai Kumar Singh	BJP	Rajendra Prasad Singh
Rohtas	211	Nokha	RJD	Anita Devi	BJP	Rameshwar Prasad
Rohtas	212	Dehri	RJD	Md. Iliyas Hussain	RLSP	Jitendra Kumar
Rohtas	213	Karakat	RJD	Sanjay Kumar Singh	BJP	Rajeshwar Raj
Arwal	214	Arwal	RJD	Ravindra Kushwaha	BJP	Chitranjan Kumar
Arwal	215	Kurtha	JD(U)	Satyadeo Singh	RLSP	Ashok Kumar Verma
Jehanabad	216	Jahanabad	RJD	Mudrika Singh Yadav	RLSP	Praveen Kumar
Jehanabad	217	Ghosi	JD(U)	Krishna Nandan Verma	HAM	Rahul Kumar
Jehanabad	218	Makhadumapur (SC)	RJD	Subedar Das	HAM	Jitan Ram Manjhi
Aurangabad	219	Goh	JD(U)	Ranvijay Kumar	BJP	Manoj Kumar
Aurangabad	220	Obra	RJD	Birendra Yadav	RLSP	Chandra Bhushan Verma
Aurangabad	221	Nabinagar	JD(U)	Virendra Kumar Singh	BJP	Gopal Narayan Singh
Aurangabad	222	Kutumba (SC)	INC	Rajesh Kumar	HAM	Santosh Kumar Suman
Aurangabad	223	Aurangabad	INC	Anand Shankar Singh	BJP	Ramadhar Singh
Aurangabad	224	Rafiganj	JD(U)	Ashok Kumar Singh	LJP	Pramod Kumar Singh
Gaya	225	Gurua	JD(U)	Ramchandra Singh	BJP	Rajiv Nandan
Gaya	226	Sherghati	JD(U)	Vinod Prasad Yadav	HAM	Mukesh Kumar Yadav
Gaya	227	Imamganj (SC)	JD(U)	Uday Choudhary	HAM	Jitan Ram Manjhi
Gaya	228	Barachatti (SC)	RJD	Samta Devi	LJP	Sudha Devi
Gaya	229	Bodh Gaya (SC)	RJD	Kumar Sarvjeet	BJP	Shyamdeo Paswan
Gaya	230	Gaya Town	INC	Priya Ranjan	BJP	Prem Kumar
Gaya	231	Tikari	JD(U)	Abhay Kushwaha	HAM	Anil Kumar
Gaya	232	Belaganj	RJD	Surendra Prasad Yadav	HAM	Sharim Ali
Gaya	233	Atri	RJD	Kunti Devi	LJP	Arvind Kumar Singh
Gaya	234	Wazirganj	INC	Awadhesh Kumar Singh	BJP	Birendra Singh
Nawada	235	Rajauli (SC)	RJD	Prakash Veer	BJP	Arjun Ram
Nawada	236	Hisua	JD(U)	Kaushal Yadav	BJP	Anil Singh
Nawada	237	Nawada	RJD	Raj Ballabh Yadav	RLSP	Indradeo Prasad
Nawada	238	Gobindpur	INC	Purnima Yadav	BJP	Fula Devi
Nawada	239	Warsaliganj	JD(U)	Pradip Kumar	BJP	Aruna Devi
Jamui	240	Sikandra (SC)	INC	Sudhir Kumar	LJP	Subhash Chandra Bosh
Jamui	241	Jamui	RJD	Vijay Prakash	BJP	Ajoy Pratap
Jamui	242	Jhajha	JD(U)	Damodar Rawat	BJP	Ravindra Yadav
Jamui	243	Chakai	RJD	Savitri Devi	LJP	Vijay Kumar Singh

== Opinion polls ==
When conducted	Ref	Polling organisation/agency	Sample size			
When conducted	Ref	Polling organisation/agency	Sample size	MGB	NDA	Other
Apr–May 2015		ABP News	NA	127	111	5
Jun–Jul 2015		ABP News – Nielsen	NA	121	118	4
August–September 2015		India Today – Cicero	5,968	106	125	12
August–September 2015		India TV–CVoter poll	10,638	120–128	94–106	17–21
3–7 September 2015		ABP News – Nielsen	4,493	122	118	3
12–13 September 2015		Zee News Survey	31,906	70–103	140–173	0
23 September 2015		Times Now – CVoter	7,786	112	117	14
October 2015		Leadtech – infoelections.com	11,566	73	168	
8 October 2015		CNN-IBN–Axis Poll	27500	137	95	11
7 October 2015		ABP News	NA	112	128	3
October 2015		India Today – Cicero poll	NA	122	111	10
October 2015		News Nation	7,000	115–119	120–124	2–4
October 2015		India TV– Cvoter	9,916	108–124	111–127	4–12

== Election ==
The electoral process cost about ₹300 crore (US$32 million) to the Bihar government exchequer.

The electorate in Chandila village of Maker block in Saran district's Amnour Assembly constituency boycotted the election and no votes were cast in protest against the government's failure to bring electricity to their village.

== Exit polls ==
The Axis APM polls was not finally aired by its commissioning news channel, CNN–IBN.

Polling organisation/agency	Ref	Sample size			
Polling organisation/agency	Ref	Sample size	MGB	NDA	Other
ABP News – Nielsen		—N/a	130	108	5
CNN–IBN – Axis		—N/a	176	64	3
India Today – Cicero		—N/a	111–123	113–127	4–8
NDTV – Hansa		76,000	110	125	8
India TV–Times Now–CVoter		35,000+	112–132	101–121	6–14
News 24 – Today's Chanakya		—N/a	83	155	5

== Results ==
The result was announced on 8 November. The counting of EVMs of 14 assembly constituencies of Patna district was done in AN College Patna. The NOTA option had nine lakhs, or 2.5%, of popular votes and was the highest it had achieved in Bihar elections. The number of Yadav MLAs increased to 61 in the Bihar assembly.

Results showed that, of the 53 seats won by BJP, 27 were urban areas, which signified that BJP had dramatically shrunk back to its traditional urban support base in Bihar. BJP failed to make a big impact in the rural areas of Bihar, which has one of the lowest urbanization rates. Only 11.3% of the population of Bihar lives in urban areas, which is lowest in India after Himachal Pradesh.

According to one analysis, RJD was the biggest beneficiary of this election. RJD increased its seat tally by 59 compared with the previous election. RJD had the best strike rate by winning 81 of the 101 seats contested. RJD became the single largest party in Bihar Assembly. RJD defeated BJP in 36 seats BJP had won in the last election, similarly, it took 25 seats JD (U) had won in the last election.

=== Summary ===
↓
178	58	7
Mahagathbandhan	NDA	Others

Map displaying constituencies won by parties

Summary of results of the 2015 Bihar Legislative Assembly election
Alliance	Political party	Votes	Vote %	Change in vote %	Vote % in seats contested	Seats contested	Won	Net change in seats	% of seats
Mahagathbandhan	Rashtriya Janata Dal	69,95,509	18.4	▼0.44	▲44.35	101	80	▲58	32.92
Mahagathbandhan	Janata Dal (United)	64,16,414	16.8	▼5.81	▲40.65	101	71	▼44	29.21
Mahagathbandhan	Indian National Congress	25,39,638	6.7	▼1.68	▲39.49	41	27	▲23	11.11
NDA	Bharatiya Janata Party	93,08,015	24.4	▲7.94	▼37.48	157	53	▼38	21.81
NDA	Lok Janshakti Party	18,40,834	4.8	▼1.95	▲28.79	42	2	▼1	0.82
NDA	Rashtriya Lok Samata Party	9,76,787	2.6	-	0.64	23	2	▲2	0.82
NDA	Hindustani Awam Morcha (Secular)	8,64,856	2.3	-	26.90	21	1	▲1	0.41
Left Front	Communist Party of India	5,16,699	1.36	▼0.29	▼3.43	98	0	▼1	0
Left Front	CPI(ML) Liberation	5,87,701	1.54	▼0.29	▼3.82	98	3	▲3	1.23
Left Front	Communist Party of India (Marxist)	2,32,149	0.61	▼0.21	▼3.32	43	0	Steady	0
Left Front	Socialist Unity Centre of India (Communist)	11,621	0.03	▼0.02	▼0.74	10	0	Steady	0
Left Front	All India Forward Bloc	6,936	0.02	0.00	▼0.21	9	0	Steady	0
Left Front	Revolutionary Socialist Party	3,045	0.01	0.00	▼0.64	3	0	Steady	0
Socialist; Secular; Morcha	Samajwadi Party	3,85,511	1.0	▲0.45	▲1.83	85	0	Steady	0
Socialist; Secular; Morcha	Jan Adhikar Party (Loktantrik)	5,14,748	1.4	—N/a	—N/a	64	0	Steady	0
Socialist; Secular; Morcha	Nationalist Congress Party	1,85,437	0.5	▼1.32	▲2.82	40	0	Steady	0
Socialist; Secular; Morcha	Samras Samaj Party	—N/a	—N/a	—N/a	—N/a	28	0	Steady	0
Socialist; Secular; Morcha	Samajwadi Janata Dal Democratic	—N/a	—N/a	—N/a	—N/a	23	0	Steady	0
Socialist; Secular; Morcha	National People's Party	—N/a	—N/a	—N/a	—N/a	3	0	Steady	0
Others	Bahujan Samaj Party	7,88,024	2.1	▼1.11	▼2.21	243	0	Steady	0
Others	Shiv Sena	2,11,131	0.6	▲0.21	▼1.84	150	0	Steady	0
Others	Sarvajan Kalyan Loktantrik Party	1,08,851	0.3	—N/a	0.91	90	0	Steady	0
Others	Jharkhand Mukti Morcha	1,03,940	0.3	▼0.31	▼2.02	—N/a	0	Steady	0
Others	Garib Janata Dal (Secular)	92,279	0.2	—N/a	0.66	—N/a	0	Steady	0
Others	All India Majlis-e-Ittehadul Muslimeen	80,248	0.2	—N/a	8.04	6	0	Steady	0
Others	Independents	35,80,953	9.4	▲3.82	▼9.57	1150	4	▼2	1.64
	NOTA	9,47,276	2.5	—N/a	2.49	243	—N/a	—N/a	—N/a
Total	3,76,73,594	100.00			243				
Valid votes	3,76,73,594	99.94							
Invalid votes	23,384	0.06							
Votes cast / turnout	3,76,73,594	56.91							
Abstentions	2,85,46,215	43.09							
Registered voters	6,62,43,193								

=== Results by district ===
District	Seats			
District	Seats	MGB	NDA	OTH
Araria	6	4	2	—N/a
Arwal	2	2	—N/a	—N/a
Aurangabad	6	5	1	—N/a
Banka	5	4	1	—N/a
Begusarai	7	7	—N/a	—N/a
Bhagalpur	7	7	—N/a	—N/a
Bhojpur	7	6	—N/a	1
Buxar	4	4	—N/a	—N/a
Darbhanga	10	8	2	—N/a
East Champaran	12	4	8	—N/a
Gaya	10	7	3	—N/a
Gopalganj	6	4	2	—N/a
Jamui	4	3	1	—N/a
Jehanabad	3	3	—N/a	—N/a
Kaimur	4	—N/a	4	—N/a
Katihar	7	4	2	1
Khagaria	4	4	—N/a	—N/a
Kishanganj	4	4	—N/a	—N/a
Lakhisarai	2	1	1	—N/a
Madhepura	4	4	—N/a	—N/a
Madhubani	10	8	2	—N/a
Munger	3	3	—N/a	—N/a
Muzaffarpur	11	6	3	2
Nalanda	7	6	1	—N/a
Nawada	5	3	2	—N/a
Patna	14	6	7	1
Purnia	7	5	2	—N/a
Rohtas	7	6	1	—N/a
Saharsa	4	4	—N/a	—N/a
Samastipur	10	10	—N/a	—N/a
Saran	10	8	2	—N/a
Sheikhpura	2	2	—N/a	—N/a
Sheohar	1	1	—N/a	—N/a
Sitamarhi	8	6	2	—N/a
Siwan	8	6	1	1
Supaul	5	4	1	—N/a
Vaishali	8	6	2	—N/a
West Champaran	9	3	5	1
Total	243	178	58	7

Note: "Others" include 4 Independent candidates and 3 CPI(ML)(L) candidates who won their respective seats.

=== Results by constituency ===
Results
Assembly constituency		Winner			Runner up			Margin
#	Name	Candidate	Party	Votes	Candidate	Party	Votes	Margin
West Champaran District
1	Valmiki Nagar	Dhirendra Pratap Singh	Ind	66,860	Irshad Hussain	INC	33,280	33,580
2	Ramnagar	Bhagirathi Devi	BJP	82,166	Purnmasi Ram	INC	64,178	17,988
3	Narkatiaganj	Vinay Verma	INC	57,212	Renu Devi	BJP	41,151	16,061
4	Bagaha	Raghaw Sharan Pandey	BJP	74,476	Bhishm Sahani	JD(U)	66,293	8,183
5	Lauriya	Vinay Bihari	BJP	57,351	Ran Kaushal Pratap Singh	RJD	39,778	17,573
6	Nautan	Narayan Prasad	BJP	66,697	Baidyanath Prasad Mahto	JD(U)	52,362	14,335
7	Chanpatia	Prakash Rai	BJP	61,304	N. N. Sahi	JD(U)	60,840	464
8	Bettiah	Madan Mohan Tiwari	INC	66,786	Renu Devi	BJP	64,466	2,320
9	Sikta	Khurshid (Feroz Ahmad)	JD(U)	69,870	Dilip Varma	BJP	67,035	2,835
East Champaran District
10	Raxaul	Ajay Kumar Singh	BJP	64,731	Suresh Kumar	RJD	61,562	3,169
11	Sugauli	Ramchandra Sahani	BJP	62,384	Om Prakash Choudhary	RJD	54,628	7,756
12	Narkatiya	Shamim Ahmad	RJD	75,118	Sant Singh Kushwaha	RLSP	55,136	19,982
13	Harsidhi	Rajendra Kumar	RJD	75,203	Krishnanandan Paswan	BJP	64,936	10,267
14	Govindganj	Raju Tiwari	LJP	74,685	Brajesh Kumar	INC	46,765	27,920
15	Kesaria	Rajesh Kumar	RJD	62,902	Rajendra Prasad Gupta	BJP	46,955	15,947
16	Kalyanpur	Sachindra Prasad Singh	BJP	50,060	Razia Khatoon	JD(U)	38,572	11,488
17	Pipra	Shyambabu Prasad Yadav	BJP	65,552	Krishan Chandra	JD(U)	61,622	3,930
18	Madhuban	Rana Randhir Singh	BJP	61,054	Shivajee Rai	JD(U)	44,832	16,222
19	Motihari	Pramod Kumar	BJP	79,947	Binod Kumar Shrivastava	RJD	61,430	18,517
20	Chiraia	Lal Babu Prasad Gupta	BJP	62,831	Laxmi Narayan Prasad Yadav	RJD	58,457	4,374
21	Dhaka	Faisal Rahman	RJD	87,458	Pawan Kumar Jaiswal	BJP	68,261	19,197
Sheohar District
22	Sheohar	Sharfuddin	JD(U)	44,576	Lovely Anand	HAM	44,115	461
Sitamarhi District
23	Riga	Amit Kumar Tuna	INC	79,217	Moti Lal Prasad	BJP	56,361	22,856
24	Bathnaha	Dinkar Ram	BJP	74,763	Surendra Ram	INC	54,597	20,166
25	Parihar	Gayatri Devi	BJP	66,388	Ram Chandra Purve	RJD	62,371	4,017
26	Sursand	Syed Abu Dojana	RJD	52,857	Amit Kumar	Ind	29,623	23,234
27	Bajpatti	Ranju Geeta	JD(U)	67,194	Rekha Kumari	RLSP	50,248	16,946
28	Sitamarhi	Sunil Kumar	RJD	81,557	Sunil Kumar Pintu	BJP	66,835	14,722
29	Runnisaidpur	Mangita Devi	RJD	55,699	Pankaj Kumar Mishra	RLSP	41,589	14,110
30	Belsand	Sunita Singh Chauhan	JD(U)	33,785	Md. Nasir Ahamad	LJP	28,210	5,575
Madhubani District
31	Harlakhi	Basant Kumar	RLSP	40,468	Mohammad Shabbir	INC	36,576	3,892
32	Benipatti	Bhawana Jha	INC	55,978	Vinod Narayan Jha	BJP	51,244	4,734
33	Khajauli	Sitaram Yadav	RJD	71,534	Arun Shankar Prasad	BJP	60,831	10,703
34	Babubarhi	Kapil Deo Kamat	JD(U)	61,486	Binod Kumar Singh	LJP	41,219	20,267
35	Bisfi	Faiyaz Ahmad	RJD	70,975	Manoj Kumar Yadav	RLSP	35,650	35,325
36	Madhubani	Samir Kumar Mahaseth	RJD	76,823	Ramdeo Mahto	BJP	69,516	7,307
37	Rajnagar	Ram Prit Paswan	BJP	71,614	Ramawatar Paswan	RJD	65,372	6,242
38	Jhanjharpur	Gulab Yadav	RJD	64,320	Nitish Mishra	BJP	63,486	834
39	Phulparas	Guljar Devi Yadav	JD(U)	64,368	Ram Sundar Yadav	BJP	50,953	13,415
40	Laukaha	Lakshmeshwar Roy	JD(U)	79,971	Pramod Kumar Priyedarshi	BJP	56,138	23,833
Supaul District
41	Nirmali	Aniruddha Prasad Yadav	JD(U)	79,600	Ram Kumar Roy	BJP	55,649	23,951
42	Pipra	Yaduvansh Kumar Yadav	RJD	85,944	Vishwa Mohan Kumar	BJP	49,575	36,369
43	Supaul	Bijendra Prasad Yadav	JD(U)	82,295	Kishor Kumar	BJP	44,898	37,397
44	Triveniganj	Veena Bharti	JD(U)	89,869	Anant Kumar Bharti	LJP	37,469	52,400
45	Chhatapur	Neeraj Kumar Singh	BJP	75,697	Jahur Alam	RJD	66,405	9,292
Araria District
46	Narpatganj	Anil Kumar Yadav	RJD	90,250	Janardan Yadav	BJP	64,299	25,951
47	Raniganj	Achmit Rishidev	JD(U)	77,717	Ramjidas Rishidev	BJP	62,787	14,930
48	Forbesganj	Vidya Sagar Keshri	BJP	85,929	Krityanand Biswas	RJD	60,691	25,238
49	Araria	Avidur Rahman	INC	92,667	Ajay Kumar Jha	LJP	52,623	40,044
50	Jokihat	Sarfaraz Alam	JD(U)	92,890	Ranjeet Yadav	Ind	38,910	53,980
51	Sikti	Vijay Kumar Mandal	BJP	76,995	Shatrughan Prasad Suman	JD(U)	68,889	8,106
Kishanganj District
52	Bahadurganj	Md. Tauseef Alam	INC	53,533	Awadh Bihari Singh	BJP	39,591	13,942
53	Thakurganj	Naushad Alam	JD(U)	74,239	Gopal Kumar Agrawal	LJP	66,152	8,087
54	Kishanganj	Mohammad Jawed	INC	66,522	Sweety Singh	BJP	57,913	8,609
55	Kochadhaman	Mujahid Alam	JD(U)	55,929	Akhtarul Iman	AIMIM	37,086	18,843
Purnia District
56	Amour	Abdul Zalil Mastan	INC	100,135	Saba Zafar	BJP	48,138	51,997
57	Baisi	Abdus Subhan	RJD	67,022	Vinod Kumar	Ind	28,282	38,740
58	Kasba	Md Afaque Alam	INC	81,633	Pradip Kumar Das	BJP	79,839	1,794
59	Banmankhi	Krishna Kumar Rishi	BJP	59,053	Sanjiv Kumar Paswan	RJD	58,345	708
60	Rupauli	Bima Bharti	JD(U)	50,945	Prem Prakash Mandal	BJP	41,273	9,672
61	Dhamdaha	Leshi Singh	JD(U)	75,400	Shiv Shankar Thakur	RLSP	45,583	29,817
62	Purnia	Vijay Kumar Khemka	BJP	92,020	Indu Sinha	INC	59,205	32,815
Katihar District
63	Katihar	Tarkishore Prasad	BJP	66,048	Bijay Singh	JD(U)	51,154	14,894
64	Kadwa	Shakeel Ahmad Khan	INC	56,141	Chander Bhushan Thakur	BJP	50,342	5,799
65	Balrampur	Mahbub Alam	CPI(ML)L	62,513	Barun Kumar Jha	BJP	42,094	20,419
66	Pranpur	Binod Kumar Singh	BJP	47,924	Israt Parween	NCP	39,823	8,101
67	Manihari	Manohar Prasad Singh	INC	61,704	Anil Kumar Oraon	LJP	48,024	13,680
68	Barari	Neeraj Kumar	RJD	71,175	Bibhash Chandra Choudhary	BJP	56,839	14,336
69	Korha	Punam Paswan	INC	78,409	Mahesh Paswan	BJP	72,983	5,426
Madhepura District
70	Alamnagar	Narendra Narayan Yadav	JD(U)	87,962	Chandan Singh	LJP	44,086	43,876
71	Bihariganj	Niranjan Kumar Mehta	JD(U)	78,361	Ravindra Charan Yadav	BJP	49,108	29,253
72	Singheshwar	Ramesh Rishidev	JD(U)	83,073	Manju Devi	HAM	32,873	50,200
73	Madhepura	Chandra Shekhar	RJD	90,974	Vijay Kumar Bimal	BJP	53,332	37,642
Saharsa District
74	Sonbarsha	Ratnesh Sada	JD(U)	88,789	Sarita Devi	LJP	35,026	53,763
75	Saharsa	Arun Kumar	RJD	102,850	Alok Ranjan Jha	BJP	63,644	39,206
76	Simri Bakhtiarpur	Dinesh Chandra Yadav	JD(U)	78,514	Yusuf Salahuddin	LJP	40,708	37,806
77	Mahishi	Abdul Ghafoor	RJD	56,436	Chandan Kumar Sah	RLSP	30,301	26,135
Darbhanga District
78	Kusheshwar Asthan	Shashi Bhushan Hazari	JD(U)	50,062	Dhananjay Kumar Paswan	LJP	30,212	19,850
79	Gaura Bauram	Madan Sahni	JD(U)	51,403	Vinod Sahni	LJP	37,341	14,062
80	Benipur	Sunil Choudhary	JD(U)	69,511	Gopal Jee Thakur	BJP	43,068	26,443
81	Alinagar	Abdul Bari Siddiqui	RJD	67,461	Mishri Lal Yadav	BJP	54,001	13,460
82	Darbhanga Rural	Lalit Kumar Yadav	RJD	70,557	Naushad Ahmad	HAM	36,066	34,491
83	Darbhanga	Sanjay Saraogi	BJP	77,776	Om Prakash Kheria	RJD	70,316	7,460
84	Hayaghat	Amarnath Gami	JD(U)	65,677	Ramesh Choudhary	LJP	32,446	33,231
85	Bahadurpur	Bhola Yadav	RJD	71,547	Hari Sahni	BJP	54,558	16,989
86	Keoti	Faraz Fatmi	RJD	68,601	Ashok Kumar Yadav	BJP	60,771	7,830
87	Jale	Jibesh Kumar	BJP	62,059	Rishi Mishra	JD(U)	57,439	4,620
Muzaffarpur District
88	Gaighat	Maheshwar Prasad Yadav	RJD	67,313	Veena Devi	BJP	63,812	3,501
89	Aurai	Surendra Kumar	RJD	66,958	Ram Surat Kumar	BJP	56,133	10,825
90	Minapur	Munna Yadav	RJD	80,790	Ajay Kumar	BJP	56,850	23,940
91	Bochahan	Baby Kumari	Ind	67,720	Ramai Ram	JD(U)	43,590	24,130
92	Sakra	Lal Babu Ram	RJD	75,010	Arjun Ram	BJP	61,998	13,012
93	Kurhani	Kedar Prasad Gupta	BJP	73,227	Manoj Kumar Singh	JD(U)	61,657	11,570
94	Muzaffarpur	Suresh Kumar Sharma	BJP	95,594	Bijendra Chaudhary	JD(U)	65,855	29,739
95	Kanti	Ashok Kumar Choudhary	Ind	58,111	Ajit Kumar	HAM	48,836	9,275
96	Baruraj	Nand Kumar Rai	RJD	68,011	Arun Kumar Singh	BJP	63,102	4,909
97	Paroo	Ashok Kumar Singh	BJP	80,445	Shankar Prasad	RJD	66,906	13,539
98	Sahebganj	Ram Vichar Ray	RJD	70,583	Raju Kumar Singh	BJP	59,923	10,660
Gopalganj District
99	Baikunthpur	Mithlesh Tiwari	BJP	56,162	Manjeet Kumar Singh	JD(U)	42,047	14,115
100	Barauli	Md. Nematullah	RJD	61,690	Rampravesh Rai	BJP	61,186	504
101	Gopalganj	Subhash Singh	BJP	78,491	Reyazul Haque Raju	RJD	73,417	5,074
102	Kuchaikote	Amrendra Kumar Pandey	JD(U)	72,224	Kali Prasad Pandey	LJP	68,662	3,562
103	Bhore	Anil Kumar	INC	74,365	Indradev Manjhi	BJP	59,494	14,871
104	Hathua	Ramsewak Singh	JD(U)	57,917	Mahachandra Prasad Singh	HAM	34,933	22,984
Siwan District
105	Siwan	Vyas Deo Prasad	BJP	55,156	Bablu Prasad	JD(U)	51,622	3,534
106	Ziradei	Ramesh Singh Kushwaha	JD(U)	40,760	Asha Devi	BJP	34,669	6,091
107	Darauli	Satyadeo Ram	CPI(ML)L	49,576	Ramayan Manjhi	BJP	39,992	9,584
108	Raghunathpur	Hari Shankar Yadav	RJD	61,042	Manoj Kumar Singh	BJP	50,420	10,622
109	Daraunda	Kavita Singh	JD(U)	66,255	Jitendra Swami	BJP	53,033	13,222
110	Barharia	Shyam Bahadur Singh	JD(U)	65,168	Bachha Panday	LJP	50,585	14,583
111	Goriakothi	Satyadeo Prasad Singh	RJD	70,965	Devesh Kant Singh	BJP	63,314	7,651
112	Maharajganj	Hem Narayan Sah	JD(U)	68,459	Kumar Deo Ranjan Singh	BJP	48,167	20,292
Saran District
113	Ekma	Manoranjan Singh	JD(U)	49,508	Kameshwar Kumar Singh	BJP	41,382	8,126
114	Manjhi	Vijay Shanker Dubey	INC	29,558	Keshav Singh	LJP	20,692	8,866
115	Baniapur	Kedar Nath Singh	RJD	69,851	Tarkeshwar Singh	BJP	53,900	15,951
116	Taraiya	Mudrika Prasad Rai	RJD	69,012	Janak Singh	BJP	48,572	20,440
117	Marhaura	Jitendra Kumar Ray	RJD	66,714	Lal Babu Rai	BJP	49,996	16,718
118	Chapra	C. N. Gupta	BJP	71,646	Randhir Kumar Singh	RJD	60,267	11,379
119	Garkha	Muneshwar Chaudhary	RJD	89,249	Gyanchand Manjhi	BJP	49,366	39,883
120	Amnour	Shatrudhan Tiwari	BJP	39,134	Krishna Kumar Mantoo	JD(U)	33,883	5,251
121	Parsa	Chandrika Rai	RJD	77,211	Chhotelal Rai	LJP	34,876	42,335
122	Sonpur	Ramanuj Prasad Yadav	RJD	86,082	Vinay Kumar Singh	BJP	49,686	36,396
Vaishali District
123	Hajipur	Awadhesh Singh	BJP	86,773	Jagannath Prasad Rai	INC	74,578	12,195
124	Lalganj	Raj Kumar Sah	LJP	80,842	Vijay Kumar Shukla	JD(U)	60,549	20,293
125	Vaishali	Raj Kishore Singh	JD(U)	79,286	Brishin Patel	HAM	48,225	31,061
126	Mahua	Tej Pratap Yadav	RJD	66,927	Ravindra Ray	HAM	38,772	28,155
127	Raja Pakar	Shivchandra Ram	RJD	61,251	Ram Nath Raman	LJP	46,096	15,155
128	Raghopur	Tejashwi Yadav	RJD	91,236	Satish Kumar	BJP	68,503	22,733
129	Mahnar	Umesh Singh Kushwaha	JD(U)	69,825	Achuta Nand	BJP	43,370	26,455
130	Patepur	Prema Chaudhary	RJD	67,548	Mahendra Baitha	BJP	55,087	12,461
Samastipur District
131	Kalyanpur	Maheshwar Hazari	JD(U)	84,904	Prince Raj	LJP	47,218	37,686
132	Warisnagar	Ashok Kumar	JD(U)	92,687	Chandrashekhar Rai	LJP	34,114	58,573
133	Samastipur	Akhtarul Islam Sahin	RJD	82,508	Renu Kushawaha	BJP	51,428	31,080
134	Ujiarpur	Alok Kumar Mehta	RJD	85,466	Kumar Anant	RLSP	38,006	47,460
135	Morwa	Vidya Sagar Singh Nishad	JD(U)	59,206	Suresh Ray	BJP	40,390	18,816
136	Sarairanjan	Vijay Kumar Chaudhary	JD(U)	81,055	Ranjeet Nirguni	BJP	47,011	34,044
137	Mohiuddinnagar	Ejya Yadav	RJD	47,137	Rajesh Kumar Singh	Ind	23,706	23,431
138	Bibhutipur	Ram Balak Singh	JD(U)	57,882	Ramdeo Verma	CPI(M)	40,647	17,235
139	Rosera	Ashok Kumar	INC	85,506	Manju Hazari	BJP	51,145	34,361
140	Hasanpur	Raj Kumar Ray	JD(U)	63,094	Vinod Choudhary	RLSP	33,494	29,600
Begusarai District
141	Cheria-Bariarpur	Manju Verma	JD(U)	69,795	Anil Kumar Chaudhary	LJP	40,059	29,736
142	Bachhwara	Ramdeo Rai	INC	73,983	Arvind Kumar Singh	LJP	37,052	36,931
143	Teghra	Birendra Kumar	RJD	68,975	Ram Lakhan Singh	BJP	53,364	15,611
144	Matihani	Narendra Kumar Singh	JD(U)	89,297	Sarvesh Kumar	BJP	66,609	22,688
145	Sahebpur Kamal	Shreenarayan Yadav	RJD	78,225	M.d. Aslam	LJP	32,751	45,474
146	Begusarai	Amita Bhushan	INC	83,521	Surendra Mehata	BJP	66,990	16,531
147	Bakhri	Upendra Paswan	RJD	72,632	Ramanand Ram	BJP	32,376	40,256
Khagaria District
148	Alauli	Chandan Kumar	RJD	70,519	Pashupati Kumar Paras	LJP	46,049	24,470
149	Khagaria	Poonam Devi Yadav	JD(U)	64,767	Rajesh Kumar	HAM	39,202	25,565
150	Beldaur	Panna Lal Singh Patel	JD(U)	63,216	Mithilesh Kumar Nishad	LJP	49,691	13,525
151	Parbatta	Ramanand Prasad Singh	JD(U)	76,248	Ramanuj Choudhary	BJP	47,324	28,924
Bhagalpur District
152	Bihpur	Varsha Rani	RJD	68,963	Kumar Shailendra	BJP	56,247	12,716
153	Gopalpur	Narendra Kumar Niraj	JD(U)	57,403	Anil Kumar Yadav	BJP	52,234	5,169
154	Pirpainti	Ram Vilash Paswan	RJD	80,058	Lalan Kumar	BJP	74,914	5,144
155	Kahalgaon	Sadanand Singh	INC	64,981	Niraj Kumar Mandal	LJP	43,752	21,229
156	Bhagalpur	Ajeet Sharma	INC	70,514	Arjit Shashwat Choubey	BJP	59,856	10,658
157	Sultanganj	Subodh Roy	JD(U)	63,345	Himanshu Prasad	RLSP	49,312	14,033
158	Nathnagar	Ajay Kumar Mandal	JD(U)	66,485	Amar Nath Prasad	LJP	58,660	7,825
Banka District
159	Amarpur	Janardan Manjhi	JD(U)	73,707	Mrinal Shekhar	BJP	61,934	11,773
160	Dhoraiya	Manish Kumar	JD(U)	68,858	Bhudeo Choudhary	RLSP	44,704	24,154
161	Banka	Ramnarayan Mandal	BJP	52,379	Zafrul Hoda	RJD	48,649	3,730
162	Katoria	Sweety Sima Hembram	RJD	54,760	Nikki Hembram	BJP	44,423	10,337
163	Belhar	Giridhari Yadav	JD(U)	70,348	Manoj Yadav	BJP	54,157	16,191
Munger District
164	Tarapur	Mewalal Chaudhary	JD(U)	66,411	Shakuni Choudhury	HAM	54,464	11,947
165	Munger	Vijay Kumar 'Vijay'	RJD	77,216	Pranav Kumar	BJP	72,851	4,365
166	Jamalpur	Shailesh Kumar	JD(U)	67,273	Himanshu Kunvar	LJP	51,797	15,476
Lakhisarai District
167	Suryagarha	Prahlad Yadav	RJD	82,490	Prem Ranjan Patel	BJP	52,460	30,030
168	Lakhisarai	Vijay Kumar Sinha	BJP	75,901	Ramanand Mandal	JD(U)	69,345	6,556
Sheikhpura District
169	Sheikhpura	Randhir Kumar Soni	JD(U)	41,755	Naresh Saw	HAM	28,654	13,101
170	Barbigha	Sudarshan Kumar	INC	46,406	Sheo Kumar	RLSP	30,689	15,717
Nalanda District
171	Asthawan	Jitendra Kumar	JD(U)	58,908	Chhote Lal Yadav	LJP	48,464	10,444
172	Biharsharif	Sunil Kumar	BJP	76,201	Mohammad Asghar Shamim	JD(U)	73,861	2,340
173	Rajgir	Ravi Jyoti Kumar	JD(U)	62,009	Satyadev Narayan Arya	BJP	56,619	5,390
174	Islampur	Chandrasen Prasad	JD(U)	66,587	Birendra Gope	BJP	66,587	22,602
175	Hilsa	Shakti Singh Yadav	RJD	72,347	Deepika Kumari	LJP	46,271	26,076
176	Nalanda	Shrawan Kumar	JD(U)	72,596	Kaushlendra Kumar	BJP	69,600	2,996
177	Harnaut	Hari Narayan Singh	JD(U)	71,933	Arun Kumar	LJP	57,638	14,295
Patna District
178	Mokama	Anant Kumar Singh	Ind	54,005	Neeraj Kumar	JD(U)	35,657	18,348
179	Barh	Gyanendra Kumar Singh	BJP	63,989	Manoj Kumar	JD(U)	55,630	8,359
180	Bakhtiarpur	Ranvijay Singh Yadav	BJP	61,496	Aniruddh Kumar Yadav	RJD	53,594	7,902
181	Digha	Sanjeev Chaurasiya	BJP	92,671	Rajeev Ranjan Prasad	JD(U)	67,892	24,779
182	Bankipur	Nitin Nabin	BJP	86,759	Kumar Ashish	INC	46,992	39,767
183	Kumhrar	Arun Kumar Sinha	BJP	87,792	Aquil Haider	INC	50,517	37,275
184	Patna Sahib	Nand Kishore Yadav	BJP	88,108	Santosh Mehta	RJD	85,316	2,792
185	Fatuha	Rama Nand Yadav	RJD	77,210	Satyendra Kumar Singh	LJP	46,808	30,402
186	Danapur	Asha Devi	BJP	72,192	Raj Kishor Yadav	RJD	66,983	5,209
187	Maner	Bhai Virendra	RJD	89,773	Srikant Nirala	BJP	66,945	22,828
188	Phulwari	Shyam Rajak	JD(U)	94,094	Rajeshwar Manjhi	HAM	48,381	45,713
189	Masaurhi	Rekha Devi	RJD	89,657	Nutan Paswan	HAM	50,471	39,186
190	Paliganj	Jai Vardhan Yadav	RJD	65,932	Ram Janm Sharma	BJP	41,479	24,453
191	Bikram	Siddharth	INC	94,088	Anil Kumar	BJP	49,777	44,311
Bhojpur District
192	Sandesh	Arun Yadav	RJD	74,306	Sanjay Singh Tiger	BJP	48,879	25,427
193	Barhara	Saroj Yadav	RJD	65,001	Asha Devi	BJP	51,693	13,308
194	Arrah	Mohammad Nawaz Alam	RJD	70,004	Amrendra Pratap Singh	BJP	69,338	666
195	Agiaon	Prabhunath Prasad	JD(U)	52,276	Shivesh Kumar	BJP	37,572	14,704
196	Tarari	Sudama Prasad	CPI(ML)L	44,050	Gita Pandey	LJP	43,778	272
197	Jagdishpur	Ram Vishun Singh	RJD	49,020	Rakesh Raushan	RLSP	38,825	10,195
198	Shahpur	Rahul Tiwari	RJD	69,315	Visheshwar Ojha	BJP	54,745	14,570
Buxar District
199	Brahampur	Shambhu Nath Yadav	RJD	94,079	Vivek Thakur	BJP	63,303	30,776
200	Buxar	Sanjay Kumar Tiwari	INC	66,527	Pradeep Dubey	BJP	56,346	10,181
201	Dumraon	Dadan Yadav	JD(U)	81,081	Ram Bihari Singh	RLSP	50,742	30,339
202	Rajpur	Santosh Kumar Nirala	JD(U)	84,184	Bishawnath Ram	BJP	51,396	32,788
Kaimur District
203	Ramgarh	Ashok Kumar Singh	BJP	57,501	Ambika Singh Yadav	RJD	49,490	8,011
204	Mohania	Niranjan Ram	BJP	60,911	Sanjay Kumar	INC	53,330	7,581
205	Bhabua	Anand Bhushan Pandey	BJP	50,768	Pramod Kumar Singh	JD(U)	43,024	7,744
206	Chainpur	Brij Kishor Bind	BJP	58,913	Mohammad Zama Khan	BSP	58,242	671
Rohtas District
207	Chenari	Lalan Paswan	RLSP	68,148	Mangal Ram	INC	58,367	9,781
208	Sasaram	Ashok Kumar	RJD	82,766	Jawahar Prasad	BJP	63,154	19,612
209	Kargahar	Bashisht Singh	JD(U)	57,018	Birendra Kumar Singh	RLSP	44,111	12,907
210	Dinara	Jai Kumar Singh	JD(U)	64,699	Rajendra Prasad Singh	BJP	62,008	2,691
211	Nokha	Anita Devi	RJD	72,780	Rameshwar Chaurasiya	BJP	49,782	22,998
212	Dehri	Mohammad Iliyas Hussain	RJD	49,402	Jitendra Kumar	RLSP	45,504	3,898
213	Karakat	Sanjay Kumar Singh	RJD	59,720	Rajeshwar Raj	BJP	47,601	12,119
Arwal District
214	Arwal	Ravindra Singh	RJD	55,295	Chitranjan Kumar	BJP	37,485	17,810
215	Kurtha	Satyadeo Singh	JD(U)	43,676	Ashok Kumar Verma	RLSP	29,557	14,119
Jehanabad District
216	Jehanabad	Mudrika Singh Yadav	RJD	76,458	Praveen Kumar	RLSP	46,137	30,321
217	Ghosi	Krishna Nandan Prasad Verma	JD(U)	67,248	Rahul Kumar	HAM	45,623	21,625
218	Makhdumpur	Subedar Das	RJD	66,631	Jitan Ram Manjhi	HAM	39,854	26,777
Aurangabad District
219	Goh	Manoj Kumar	BJP	53,615	Ranvijay Kumar	JD(U)	45,943	7,672
220	Obra	Birendra Kumar Sinha	RJD	56,042	Chandra Bhushan Verma	RLSP	44,646	11,396
221	Nabinagar	Virendra Kumar Singh	JD(U)	42,035	Gopal Narayan Singh	BJP	36,774	5,261
222	Kutumba	Rajesh Kumar	INC	51,303	Santosh Suman Manjhi	HAM	41,205	10,098
223	Aurangabad	Anand Shankar Singh	INC	63,637	Ramadhar Singh	BJP	45,239	18,398
224	Rafiganj	Ashok Kumar Singh	JD(U)	62,897	Pramod Kumar Singh	LJP	53,372	9,525
Gaya District
225	Gurua	Rajiv Nandan	BJP	56,480	Ramchandra Prasad Singh	JD(U)	49,965	6,515
226	Sherghati	Vinod Prasad Yadav	JD(U)	44,579	Mukesh Kumar Yadav	HAM	39,745	4,834
227	Imamganj	Jitan Ram Manjhi	HAM	79,389	Uday Narayan Choudhary	JD(U)	49,981	29,408
228	Barachatti	Samta Devi	RJD	70,909	Sudha Devi	LJP	51,783	19,126
229	Bodh Gaya	Kumar Sarvjeet	RJD	82,656	Shyamdeo Paswan	BJP	52,183	30,473
230	Gaya Town	Prem Kumar	BJP	66,891	Priya Ranjan	INC	44,102	22,789
231	Tikari	Abhay Kumar Sinha	JD(U)	86,975	Anil Kumar	HAM	55,162	31,813
232	Belaganj	Surendra Prasad Yadav	RJD	71,067	Sharim Ali	HAM	40,726	30,341
233	Atri	Kunti Devi	RJD	60,687	Arvind Kumar Singh	LJP	46,870	13,817
234	Wazirganj	Awadhesh Kumar Singh	INC	80,107	Birendra Singh	BJP	67,348	12,759
Nawada District
235	Rajauli	Prakash Veer	RJD	70,549	Arjun Ram	BJP	65,934	4,615
236	Hisua	Anil Singh	BJP	82,493	Kaushal Yadav	JD(U)	70,254	12,239
237	Nawada	Rajballabh Prasad	RJD	88,235	Indradeo Prasad	RLSP	71,509	16,726
238	Gobindpur	Purnima Yadav	INC	43,016	Fula Devi	BJP	38,617	4,399
239	Warisaliganj	Aruna Devi	BJP	85,912	Pradip Kumar	JD(U)	66,385	19,527
Jamui District
240	Sikandra	Sudhir Kumar	INC	59,092	Subhash Chandra Bosh	LJP	51,102	7,990
241	Jamui	Vijay Prakash Yadav	RJD	66,577	Ajoy Pratap	BJP	58,328	8,249
242	Jhajha	Rabindra Yadav	BJP	65,537	Damodar Rawat	JD(U)	43,451	22,086
243	Chakai	Savitri Devi	RJD	47,064	Sumit Kumar Singh	Ind	34,951	12,113

=== MLA statistics ===
-	#
SC	38
ST	2
Yadav	61
Muslim	24
Rajput	19
Koeri	19
Bhumihar	17
Kurmi	16
Vaishya	16
Brahmin	10
Kayastha	3
Total	243

- 1 in every 4 new members in Bihar Assembly is a Yadav
- Elected MLAs caste-wise-2015
- ಬಿಹಾರದ ಶಾಸಕರಲ್ಲಿ ಯಾದವರು ಶೇ 25ರಷುı!

== Government formation ==
Janata Dal (United) leader Nitish Kumar was sworn in as chief minister for the fifth time on 20 November 2015 after the Mahagathbandhan alliance won a sweeping victory, taking 178 seats. The two sons of RJD chief Lalu Prasad, Tejaswi and Tej Pratap were also sworn in as ministers. Tejaswi Yadav became Deputy Chief Minister. Apart from Nitish Kumar, 12 members each from the Janata Dal (United) and the Rashtriya Janata Dal and four from the Congress were administered the oath of office as ministers.

On 26 July 2017, the Grand Alliance broke and a new coalition government between JD(U) and the BJP was formed.

== Voting analysis ==
A phase-wise analysis of the polling percentages puts the fifth and final phase on the top with a 60% turnout. The polling in this round beats the 58.5% turnout recorded in the fourth phase, as also 53.7% voting in the third phase, 55.5% in the second, and 55.8% in the first phase.

- 2015 – 56.9%; 2010 – 52.7%; 2005 – 45.9%; 2000 – 62.6% (Assembly Polls were held twice in 2005 due to a fractured verdict.)

== Bypolls (2015-2020) ==
S.No	Date	Constituency	MLA before election	Party before election	Elected MLA	Party after election
31	13 February 2016	Harlakhi	Basant Kushwaha	Rashtriya Lok Samata Party	Sudhanshu Shekhar	Rashtriya Lok Samata Party
205	11 March 2018	Bhabua	Anand Bhushan Pandey	Bharatiya Janata Party	Rinki Rani Pandey	Bharatiya Janata Party
216	11 March 2018	Jehanabad	Mudrika Singh Yadav	Rashtriya Janata Dal	Suday Yadav	Rashtriya Janata Dal
50	28 May 2018	Jokihat	Sarfaraz Alam	Janata Dal (United)	Shahnawaz Alam	Rashtriya Janata Dal
237	11 April 2019	Nawada	Rajballabh Prasad	Rashtriya Janata Dal	Kaushal Yadav	Janata Dal (United)
212	19 May 2019	Dehri	Mohd. Iliyas Hussain	Rashtriya Janata Dal	Satyanarayan Singh	Bharatiya Janata Party
76	21 October 2019	Simri Bakhtiarpur	Dinesh Chandra Yadav	Janata Dal (United)	Zafar Alam	Rashtriya Janata Dal
163	21 October 2019	Belhar	Giridhari Yadav	Janata Dal (United)	Ramdeo Yadav	Rashtriya Janata Dal
109	21 October 2019	Daraunda	Kavita Singh	Janata Dal (United)	Karnjeet Singh	Independent politician
158	21 October 2019	Nathnagar	Ajay Kumar Mandal	Janata Dal (United)	Lakshmikant Mandal	Janata Dal (United)
54	21 October 2019	Kishanganj	Mohammad Jawed	Indian National Congress	Qamrul Hoda	All India Majlis-e-Ittehadul Muslimeen

== See also ==
- 2015 elections in India
- List of Assembly constituencies of Bihar
- Chief Ministers of Bihar
- 2017 Uttar Pradesh Legislative Assembly election
- Fifth Nitish Kumar ministry
- Sixth Nitish Kumar ministry
