= Mohammed Kamran =

Indian politician

Member of the Bihar Legislative Assembly
- In office 2020–2025
- Preceded by: Purnima Yadav
- Succeeded by: Binita Mehta
- Constituency: Gobindpur

Personal details
- Born: Nawada
- Party: Independent
- Parent: Mohammad Sohail (father)
- Education: Intermediate
- Alma mater: Patna Muslim Science College
- Occupation: Politics

Mohammed Kamran is an Indian politician and a member of the Bihar Legislative Assembly. He won from the Gobindpur over the Rashtriya Janata Dal symbol in the 2020 Bihar Legislative Assembly election(Roh).
