= Krishna Prasad Yadav =

Krishna Prasad Yadav may refer to:

- Krishna Prasad Yadav (Indian politician)
- Krishna Prasad Yadav (Nepali politician)
