= Krishna Prasad Yadav (Indian politician) =

Indian politician

Member of the Bihar Legislative Assembly
- In office 1995–2000
- Preceded by: Gayatri Devi Yadav
- Succeeded by: Gayatri Devi Yadav
- Constituency: Gobindpur
- In office 1990–1995
- Preceded by: Narendra Kumar
- Succeeded by: Raj Ballabh Yadav
- Constituency: Nawada

Personal details
- Born: Nawada, Nawada district, Bihar
- Party: Rashtriya Janata Dal; Janata Dal; Bharatiya Janata Party
- Relations: Raj Ballabh Yadav (brother)
- Children: Ashok Yadav (son)
- Occupation: Politician social work

Krishna Prasad Yadav was an Indian politician who was elected as a member of Bihar Legislative Assembly from Nawada as well as Gobindpur constituency in 1990 and 1995.

== Death ==
Yadav died in road incident after that his brother continue his political career Raj Ballabh Yadav.
