= Mohani Mandal =

- village
- Interactive map of Mohani Mandal
- Coordinates: 26.67249°N 85.39378°E
- Country: India
- State: Bihar
- District: Sitamarhi

Area
  - Total: 7.13 km^{2} (2.75 sq mi)

Population
  - Total: 12,043
  - Density: 1,690/km^{2} (4,370/sq mi)

Languages
  - Official: Maithili, Hindi
- Time zone: UTC+5:30 (IST)
- ISO 3166 code: IN-BR
- Vehicle registration: BR-
- Coastline: 0 kilometres (0 mi)
- Nearest city: Sitamarhi
- vidhan Sabha constituency: Bathnaha

Mohani Mandal or Mohni Modol is a village in Suppi Tehsil in the Sitamarhi district of Bihar, India. It is located 16 km towards west from the district headquarter, 3 km from Suppi, and 141 km from state capital Patna. Mohani Mandal has a total population of 12,043 people. There are about 2,802 houses. Its postal head office is Riga. Ratanpur, Babhangama, Sasaula, Kothia Rai, Harpur Pipra are the nearby villages to Mohani Mandal. Mohani Mandal is surrounded by Majorganj Block towards North, Riga Block towards South, Bairgania Block towards west, Purnahiya Block towards west.

The nearest town to Mohani Mandal is Sitamarhi which is approximately 16 km away.

== Population ==
Total Population of this village is 12,043. Male population is 6,383 and Female population is 5,660.

== Demographics ==
Maithili is spoken by most of the people.

== Educational institutes ==
- Pandit Deen Dyal Upadhaya College
- Priya Rani Rai Degree College
- Jawahar Lal Nehru Memorial College
- Sri R.B.P.I College, Bairgania
- Priti Mishra Group of Institutions
- Bhawani Bhawan Sanskrit School
- M.s. Akhta U.p.s. Mohni Khurd
- U.P.S. Jamla Parsa

== Nearby airports ==
- Patna Airport- 139 km
- Gorakhpur Airport- 216 km
- Gaya Airport- 245 km
- Varanasi Airport- 322 km
