= Nawada Assembly constituency =

- Constituency No. 237 for the Bihar Legislative Assembly

Constituency details
- Country: India
- Region: East India
- State: Bihar
- District: Nawada
- Established: 1951
- Total electors: 364,839

Member of Legislative Assembly
- 18th Bihar Legislative Assembly
- Incumbent Vibha Devi Yadav
- Party: JD(U)
- Alliance: NDA
- Elected year: 2025

Nawada Assembly constituency is one of the 243 vidhan sabha constituencies of legislative assembly of Bihar, India. It is a part of Nawada lok sabha constituency.

== Members of the Legislative Assembly ==
Year	Member	Party
1952	Ram Kishun Singh	Indian National Congress
1952	Shakti Kumar	Indian National Congress
1959^	M. Ahmad	Indian National Congress
1962	Gaurishanker Keshari	Bharatiya Jana Sangh
1967	R.S.P Yadav	Indian National Congress
1969	Gaurishanker Keshari	Bharatiya Jana Sangh
1972	Gayatri Devi Yadav	Indian National Congress
1977	Ganesh Shanker Vidyarthi	Communist Party of India (Marxist)
1980	Ganesh Shanker Vidyarthi	Communist Party of India (Marxist)
1985	Narendra Kumar	Indian National Congress
1990	Krishna Prasad Yadav	Bharatiya Janata Party
1995	Raj Ballabh Yadav	Independent
2000	Raj Ballabh Yadav	Rashtriya Janata Dal
2005	Purnima Yadav	Independent
2005	Purnima Yadav	Independent
2010	Purnima Yadav	Janata Dal (United)
2015	Raj Ballabh Yadav	Rashtriya Janata Dal
2019^	Kaushal Yadav	Janata Dal (United)
2020	Vibha Yadav	Rashtriya Janata Dal
2025	Vibha Yadav	Janata Dal (United)

== Election results ==
=== 2025 ===
Detailed Results at: https://results.eci.gov.in/ResultAcGenNov2025/ConstituencywiseS04237.htm

Bihar Legislative Assembly Election, 2025: Nawada
Party	Candidate	Votes	%	±%
JD(U)	Vibha Devi Yadav	87,423	43.39	+24.27
RJD	Kaushal Yadav	59,829	29.69	−10.37
JSP	Anuj Singh	19,349	9.6	
AIMIM	Nasima Khatoon	12,835	6.37	
Independent	Ravish Kumar	4,317	2.14	
Bhartiya Lok Chetna Party	Anita Kumari	3,111	1.54	
Independent	Bibha Kumari	2,857	1.42	
BSP	Ashok Kumar	2,285	1.13	
Independent	Jitendra Prasad	1,995	0.99	
Independent	Manoj Kumar	1,862	0.92	
NOTA	None of the above	3,268	1.62	+0.0
Majority		27,594	13.7	−0.85
Turnout		201,494	55.23	+3.98
JD(U) gain from RJD		Swing		

=== 2020 ===
Bihar Assembly election, 2020: Nawada
Party	Candidate	Votes	%	±%
RJD	Vibha Devi Yadav	72,435	40.06	−10.06
Independent	Shravan Kushwaha	46,125	25.51	
JD(U)	Kaushal Yadav	34,567	19.12	
Independent	Dhirendra Kumar Sinha Munna	9,684	5.36	
Independent	Rajendra Prasad Sahu	4,032	2.23	
LJP	Shashi Bhusan Kumar	3,090	1.71	
RLSP	Dhirendra Kumar	2,212	1.22	−39.4
NOTA	None of the above	2,930	1.62	−2.59
Majority		26,310	14.55	+5.05
Turnout		180,831	51.25	−3.59
RJD hold		Swing		

=== 2015 ===
2015 Bihar Legislative Assembly election: Nawada
Party	Candidate	Votes	%	±%
RJD	Rajballabh Prasad	88,235	50.12	
RLSP	Indradeo Prasad	71,509	40.62	
Independent	Sudhir Kumar	2,435	1.38	
NOTA	None of the above	7,418	4.21	
Majority		16,726	9.5	
Turnout		176,056	54.84	
