= Kaushal Yadav (politician) =

Indian politician

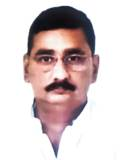

Member of Bihar Legislative Assembly
- In office 2019–2020
- Preceded by: Raj Ballabh Yadav
- Succeeded by: Vibha Devi
- Constituency: Nawada

Member of Bihar Legislative Assembly
- In office 2005–2010
- Preceded by: Gayatri Devi
- Constituency: Gobindpur

Member of Bihar Legislative Assembly
- In office 2010–2015
- Succeeded by: Purnima Yadav
- Constituency: Gobindpur

Personal details
- Born: Kaushal Yadav Nawada, Bihar, India
- Party: Janata Dal (United)
- Other political affiliations: Janata Dal
- Spouse: Purnima Yadav
- Parent: Gayatri Devi Yadav

Kaushal Yadav is an Indian politician. He was elected to the Bihar Legislative Assembly from Nawada He is a member of the Rashtriya Janta Dal.
