= Majorganj (community development block) =

- Community Development Block
- Location in Bihar, India Majorganj (India)
- Coordinates: 26.7296110°N 85.4878120°E
- Country: India
- State: Bihar
- Region: Mithila
- District: Sitamarhi

Population (2001)
  - Total: 80,195

Languages
  - Official: Maithili, Hindi
- Time zone: UTC+5:30 (IST)
- PIN: 843332
- Telephone code: +91 6226
- Lok Sabha constituency: Sitamarhi
- Vidhan Sabha constituency: Bathnaha

Majorganj (community development block) is an administrative division in Sitamarhi district in the Indian state of Bihar.It is a town more than 200 years old. It has been mentioned in the District Gazetteer of Muzzafurpur "page no. 23", that during the Anglo- Gurkha war of 1814, A British battalion was stationed there and Captain Blackney who was killed at samanpur (in now sitamarhi District) during a Gurkha ambush, is buried at Majorganj cemetery. He died on 1 January 1815.

== Geography ==
Majorganj is located at 26°43′47″N 85°29′16″E Majorganj block area ends with border of Nepal. It is a developing market place and most of the revenue of this market comes from retail customers of Nepal.

=== Panchayats ===
Panchayats in Majorganj community development block are: Ratanpur, Basbitta, Pachharwa, Bahera, Kuari Madan, Mejorganj, Khairwa and Dumri Kala.

== Demographics ==
As per 2001 census, Majoganj block had a population of 80,195.

== See also ==
- Majorganj (Vidhan Sabha constituency)
