= Shatrudhan Tiwari =

Indian politician

Member of Bihar Legislative Assembly
- In office November 2015 – 2020
- Preceded by: Krishna Kumar Mantoo
- Succeeded by: Krishna Kumar Mantoo
- Constituency: Amnour

Personal details
- Born: 1 May 1960 (age 65) Sirisiya Jagdev, Amnour, Saran, Bihar
- Party: BJP

Shatrudhan Tiwari also known as Chokar Baba is a Member of Bihar Legislative Assembly representing Amnour (Vidhan Sabha constituency) in Saran, Bihar, India.

== Early life ==
Tiwari was born at Amnour, Bihar, India. He completed his high school from Rai Saheb Paiga High School, Amnour.

== Political career ==
Tiwari was a social worker prior to entering politics. He joined Bharatiya Janata Party in 2005 and was elected as a member of Bihar Legislative Assembly in assembly elections of 2015. He represents Amnour (Vidhan Sabha constituency). He was nominated as BJP candidate from the same constituency in assembly elections of 2010 but lost to Krishna Kumar of Janata Dal (United).

Amnour Assembly (Vidhan Sabha) Election Results 2015
Year	Constituency	Category	Winner	Gender	Party	Votes
2015	Amnour	GEN	Shatrudhan Tiwari	M	BJP	39134
