= Dinkar Ram =

Indian politician from Bihar

Member in Bihar Legislative Assembly
- In office February 2005 – October 2015
- Preceded by: Gauri Shankar Nagdansh
- Constituency: Majorganj (Vidhan Sabha constituency)

Personal details
- Born: 1 April 1947 Majorganj, Sitamadhi, Bihar
- Died: 2020 (aged 72–73)
- Party: Bharatiya Janata Party
- Spouse: Late Ram Sakhi Devi
- Children: 5
- Parent: Late Shabad Ram
- Education: Matriculation
- Occupation: MLA
- Profession: Agriculture

Dinkar Ram (1947 - 2020) was an Indian politician from Bihar. He was a leader of the Bharatiya Janata Party and a member of the Bihar Legislative Assembly.

== Early life and education ==
Ram was from Bathnaha, BIhar. His was the son of late Shabad Ram. He passed Class 10 at Matric from High School, Dumri Kala, Bihar in 1962.

== Career ==
Ram was elected to the Assembly for the first time winning the February 2005 Bihar Legislative Assembly election and was re-elected again in October 2005 Bihar Legislative Assembly election. He won for the third time in the 2010 Bihar Legislative Assembly election from Bathnaha. He defeated Lalitha Devi of the LJP by a margin of 13,292 votes. He won from Bathnaha Assembly constituency representing the BJP and defeated Mahagathbandhan candidate of Indian National Congress, and former Minister Surendra Ram by a huge margin of 20,166 votes in 2015 Bihar Legislative Assembly election.

He died in 2020.
