= Amnour Assembly constituency =

Coordinates: 25°58′30″N 84°54′32″E

- Constituency No. - for the Bihar Legislative Assembly

Constituency details
- Country: India
- Region: East India
- State: Bihar
- District: Saran
- Established: 2008
- Total electors: 250,779

Member of Legislative Assembly
- 18th Bihar Legislative Assembly
- Incumbent Krishna Kumar Mantoo
- Party: BJP
- Alliance: NDA
- Elected year: 2025
- Preceded by: Shatrudhan Tiwari

Amnour Assembly constituency is an assembly constituency in Saran district in the Indian state of Bihar.

== Overview ==
As per Delimitation of Parliamentary and Assembly constituencies Order, 2008, No. 120 Amnour Assembly constituency is composed of the following: Amnour and Maker community development blocks; Sobhepur, Pachrukhi, Bheldi, Pachalakh, Chandpura and Saguni gram panchayats of Parsa CD Block.

Amnour Assembly constituency is part of No. 20 Saran Lok Sabha constituency.

In 2015 Bihar Legislative Assembly election, voters of Chandila village of Maker block in Amnour Assembly constituency completed boycotted the polling and no votes was cast in protest against the government's failure to bring electricity to their village.

== Members of Legislative Assembly ==
Year	Name	Party
Until 2008: Constituency did not exist
2010	Krishna Kumar Mantoo	Janata Dal (United)
2015	Shatrudhan Tiwari	Bharatiya Janata Party
2020	Krishna Kumar Mantoo	Bharatiya Janata Party
2025	Krishna Kumar Mantoo	Bharatiya Janata Party

== Election results ==
=== 2025 ===
Bihar Assembly election, 2025: Amnour
Party	Candidate	Votes	%	±%
BJP	Krishna Kumar Mantoo	75,525	44.52	+2.23
RJD	Sunil Kumar	71,717	42.27	+2.44
JSP	Rahul Kumar Singh	6,031	3.55	
BSP	Puja Kumari	5,695	3.36	
Independent	Lakshman Yadav	2,262	1.33	
NOTA	None of the above	3,749	2.21	−0.24
Majority		3,808	2.25	−0.21
Turnout		169,661	67.65	+10.88
BJP hold		Swing	NDA	

=== 2020 ===
Bihar Assembly election, 2020: Amnour
Party	Candidate	Votes	%	±%
BJP	Krishna Kumar Mantoo	63,316	42.29	+12.44
RJD	Sunil Kumar	59,635	39.83	
Independent	Shatrudhan Tiwari	7,493	5.0	
RLSP	Rahul Kumar	4,783	3.19	
Independent	Sangeeta Singh	3,909	2.61	
Independent	Sudish Kumar Singh	1,668	1.11	
Independent	Ram Pukar Mehata	1,538	1.03	
NOTA	None of the above	3,669	2.45	−2.47
Majority		3,681	2.46	−1.54
Turnout		149,711	56.77	+2.75
BJP hold		Swing		

=== 2015 ===
2015 Bihar Legislative Assembly election: Amnour
Party	Candidate	Votes	%	±%
BJP	Shatrudhan Tiwary	39,134	29.85	
JD(U)	Krishan Kumar Mantoo	33,883	25.85	
Independent	Sunil Kumar	29,226	22.29	
Independent	Ram Pukar Mehta	6,694	5.11	
Independent	Birendra Kumar Yadav	4,804	3.66	
Independent	Bir Kuar Singh	2,221	1.69	
BSP	Poonam Rai	1,993	1.52	
CPI	Nand Kumar Giri	1,639	1.25	
Independent	Priy Ranjan Yuvraj	1,441	1.1	
NOTA	None of the above	6,447	4.92	
Majority		5,251	4.0	
Turnout		131,095	54.02	
Bhartiya New Sanskar Krantikari Party	Sonalal Gupta	650	0.5	
