= Brahampur Assembly constituency =

Constituency of the Bihar legislative assembly in India

- Constituency No. 199 for the Bihar Legislative Assembly

Constituency details
- Country: India
- Region: East India
- State: Bihar
- District: Buxar
- Established: 1951
- Total electors: 346,158

Member of Legislative Assembly
- 18th Bihar Legislative Assembly
- Incumbent Shambhu Nath Yadav
- Party: RJD
- Alliance: MGB
- Elected year: 2025

Brahampur Assembly Constituency is an assembly Legislative constituency in Buxar district in the Indian state of Bihar. It is a part of the Buxar Lok Sabha (parliamentary) constituency of the state. As recommended by the Delimitation Commission of India in 2008, the Brahampur legislative assembly segment comprises Simri, Chakki and Brahampur community development blocks.

== Members of the Legislative Assembly ==
Below is a year-wise list of the MLAs of Brahampur Legislative Assembly Constituency along with their party names till date:

Year	Member	Party
1952	Lalan Prasad Singh	Indian National Congress
1957	Lalan Prasad Singh	Indian National Congress
1962	Budhi Nath Singh	Independent politician
1967	Suryanarain Sharma	Independent politician
1969	Suryanarain Sharma	Lok Tantrik Congress
1972	Rishi Kesh Tiwari	Indian National Congress
1977	Ramakant Thakur	Janata Party
1980	Rishi Kesh Tiwari	Indian National Congress
1985	Rishi Kesh Tiwari	Indian National Congress
1990	Swami Nath Tewary	Bharatiya Janata Party
1995	Ajit Choudhary	Janata Dal
2000	Ajit Choudhary	Rashtriya Janata Dal
2005	Ajit Choudhary	Rashtriya Janata Dal
2005	Ajit Choudhary	Rashtriya Janata Dal
2010	Dilmarni Devi	Bharatiya Janata Party
2015	Shambhu Nath Yadav	Rashtriya Janata Dal
2020	Shambhu Nath Yadav	Rashtriya Janata Dal
2025	Shambhu Nath Yadav	Rashtriya Janata Dal

== Election results ==
=== 2025 ===
Bihar Legislative Assembly Election, 2025: Brahampur
Party	Candidate	Votes	%	±%
RJD	Shambhu Nath Yadav	95,828	46.43	−2.21
LJP(RV)	Hulas Pande	92,608	44.87	
BSP	Mahavir Yadav	4,599	2.23	−0.73
Independent	Manish Bhushan Ojha	2,751	1.33	−0.21
SBSP	Sunil Kumar Ray	2,465	1.19	
Independent	Shiv Shankar Das	2,276	1.1	
Independent	Nitish Kumar	1,932	0.94	
NOTA	None of the above	2,329	1.13	−0.11
Majority		3,220	1.56	−26.03
Turnout		206,393	59.62	+5.23
RJD hold		Swing	-2.21	

=== 2020 ===
Bihar Assembly election, 2020: Brahampur
Party	Candidate	Votes	%	±%
RJD	Shambhu Nath Yadav	90,176	48.64	−3.36
LJP	Hulas Pandey	39,035	21.05	
VIP	Jairaj Chaudhary	30,482	16.44	
BSP	Jata Dhari	5,484	2.96	−0.19
Independent	Bharat Sharma @ Bharat Sharma Vyas	3,379	1.82	
JAP(L)	Parma Nand Yadav	3,182	1.72	+1.24
Independent	Manish Bhushan Ojha	2,863	1.54	
Independent	Nilesh Kumar Rahul	2,497	1.35	
Rashtriya Dal United	Anil Rai @ Bhaiya Jee	1,859	1.0	
NOTA	None of the above	2,293	1.24	−0.22
Majority		51,141	27.59	+10.58
Turnout		185,396	54.39	−2.85
RJD hold		Swing		

=== 2015 ===
Brahampur Assembly Election 2015 dates
Assembly Constituency Number	199
Category	GEN
Phases	Phase-3
Date of Notification	Thu., Oct. 1, 15
Last Date of making nominations	Thu., Oct. 8, 15
Date of Scrutiny	Fri., Oct. 9, 15
Last date for withdrawal of candidatures	Mon., Oct. 12, 15
Date of Poll	Wed., Oct. 28, 15
Counting	Sun., Nov. 8, 15
NDA Candidate	Vivek Thakur (BJP)
Mahagathbandhan Candidate	Shambhunath Yadav RJD

2015 Bihar Legislative Assembly election: Brahampur
Party	Candidate	Votes	%	±%
RJD	Shambhu Nath Yadav	94,079	52.0	
BJP	Vivek Thakur	63,303	34.99	
BSP	Ajit Chaudhary	5,690	3.15	
CPI(ML)L	Ayodhaya Kumar Singh	3,330	1.84	
Independent	Ramesh Kumar	2,736	1.51	
CPI	Prabind Kumar Singh	1,733	0.96	
NOTA	None of the above	2,638	1.46	
Majority		30,776	17.01	
Turnout		180,913	57.24	

== See also ==
- Brahmapur, Bihar
