= Vibha Devi Yadav =

Indian politician

Member of Bihar Legislative Assembly
- Incumbent
- Assumed office 2020
- Preceded by: Kaushal Yadav
- Constituency: Nawada

Personal details
- Born: 12 June 1966 (age 60) Nawada district, Bihar, India
- Party: Janata Dal (United) (2025–present); Rashtriya Janata Dal (2020–2025)
- Spouse: Raj Ballabh Yadav (Husband)
- Relations: Ashok Yadav (Nephew)
- Education: None
- Occupation: Politician; Social Worker

Vibha Devi Yadav (born 12 June 1966) is an Indian politician who was elected as a member of Bihar Legislative Assembly from Nawada constituency in 2020 as the candidate of Rashtriya Janata Dal (RJD). She resigned from RJD and joined Janta Dal (United) in 2025. She again elected as member of Bihar Legislative Assembly from Nawada constituency in 2025 as the candidate of Janta Dal (United).

== Political career ==
Yadav contested Nawada Lok Sabha constituency in 2019 as the candidate of Rashtriya Janata Dal but lost to Chandan Singh.

On 15 December 2018, her husband Raj Ballabh Yadav – then the sitting MLA from the Nawada constituency – was convicted of the rape of a minor girl and sentenced to life imprisonment. In the 2020 Bihar Legislative Assembly election, the RJP denied tickets to candidates who had been accused of rape and supported the candidature of their wives instead. Vibha Devi contested the Nawada seat as the Rashtriya Janata Dal (RJD) candidate and won with over 40 percent of the votes.

She was re-elected from the same constituency in 2025, this time as a candidate of the Janata Dal (United)JD(U).

== Public image ==
=== Public criticism over competence and literacy ===
Many critics have questioned whether Vibha Devi is sufficiently prepared or qualified to be a lawmaker, given her lack of formal education and inability to read and understand legislative documents. Media coverage and public commentary have repeatedly argued that Vibha Devi, the illiterate wife of a former MLA with a controversial reputation as a convicted rapist, reflects the nepotistic and dynastic political practices in the state of Bihar.

=== Oath-taking incident (2025) ===
During the opening session of the 18th Bihar Legislative Assembly, Vibha Devi struggled to read aloud the Hindi oath paper. She faltered repeatedly and even sought help from a fellow MLA, Manorama Devi, seated beside her to dictate the oath lines. Manorama Devi then enunciated the oath word by word to Vibha Devi, who still struggled to speak the words correctly. The video of this moment quickly went viral across the country and raised questions about candidate selection and public representation in Bihar.

Reporting after her oath fiasco also highlighted her disclosed assets of ₹31 crores, bringing public attention to her socio-economic status relative to her literacy and legislative capability.

== See also ==
- Nawada Assembly constituency
- Raj Ballabh Yadav
- Ashok Yadav
