= Krishna Kumar Mantoo =

Indian politician (born 1977)

Krishan Kumar Mantoo
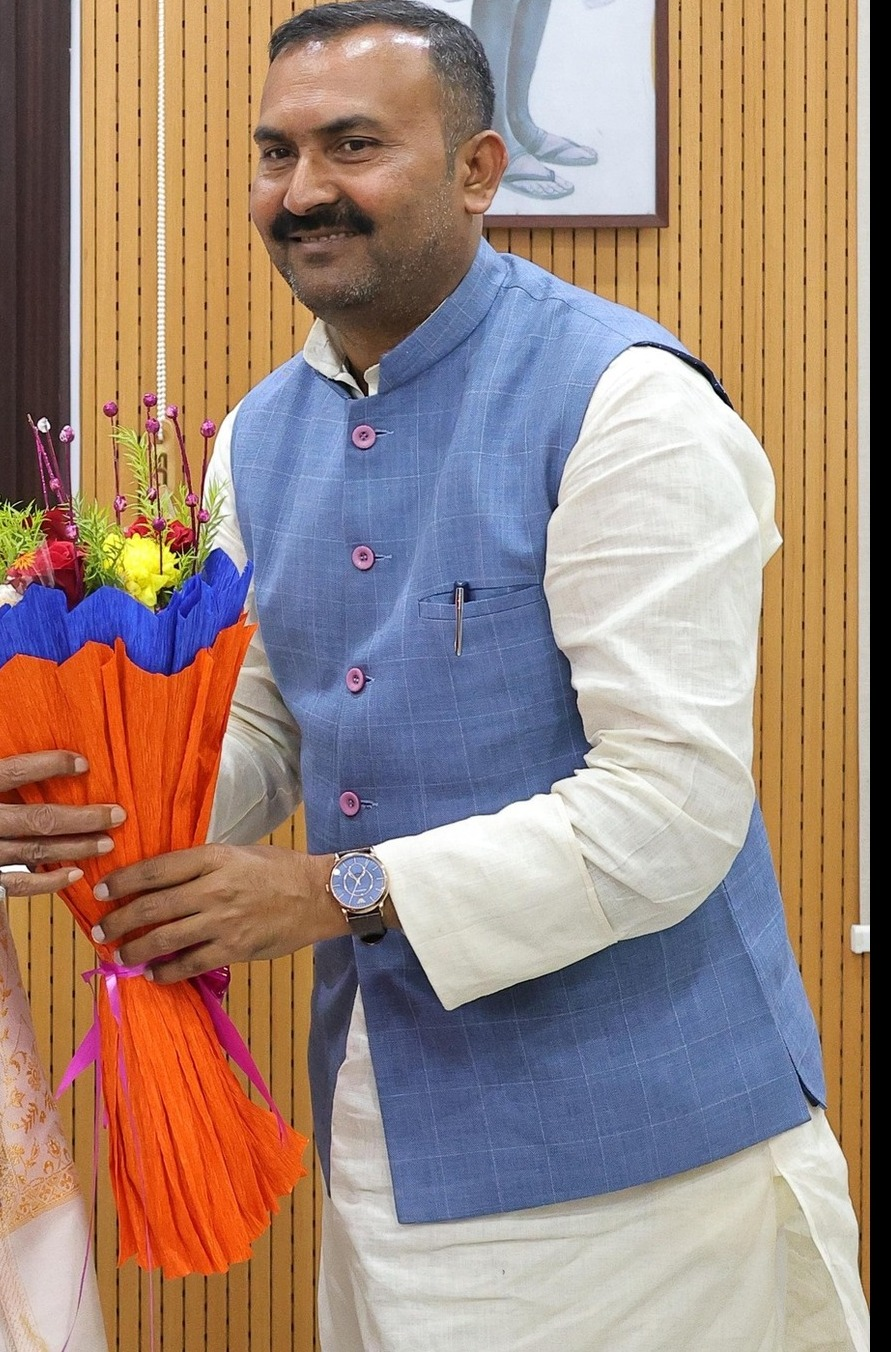

Member of Bihar Legislative Assembly
- Incumbent
- Assumed office 2020
- Preceded by: Shatrudhan Tiwari
- Constituency: Amnour
- In office 2010–2015
- Preceded by: Constituency created
- Succeeded by: Shatrudhan Tiwari
- Constituency: Amnour

Minister of Information Technology Government of Bihar
- In office 26 February 2025 – 20 November 2025
- Preceded by: Santosh Kumar Suman
- Succeeded by: Shreyasi Singh

Personal details
- Born: 27 February 1977 (age 49) Banauta, Parsa
- Party: Bharatiya Janata Party
- Other political affiliations: Janata Dal (United)
- Occupation: Politician

Krishan Kumar Mantoo (born 27 February 1977) is an Indian politician from the Bharatiya Janata Party and was sitting MLA from Amnour Vidhan Sabha constituency. He was an MLA from Amnour Vidhan Sabha constituency from 2010 to 2015. In 2020, he won for the second time from Amnour constituency on the symbol of Bharatiya Janata Party.

== Early life ==
Krishan Kumar's father Laxmi Narayan Singh is a farmer and he belongs to agricultural family. He belongs to Banauta village, which comes under Parsa police station of Saran district. He is also the president of Patel Chhatrawas Nirman Trust, a trust dedicated to build Patel Hostels for students belonging to economically and socially backward class in all districts of Bihar, three hostels have been completed and another two are in progress as of October 2024.

== Political career ==
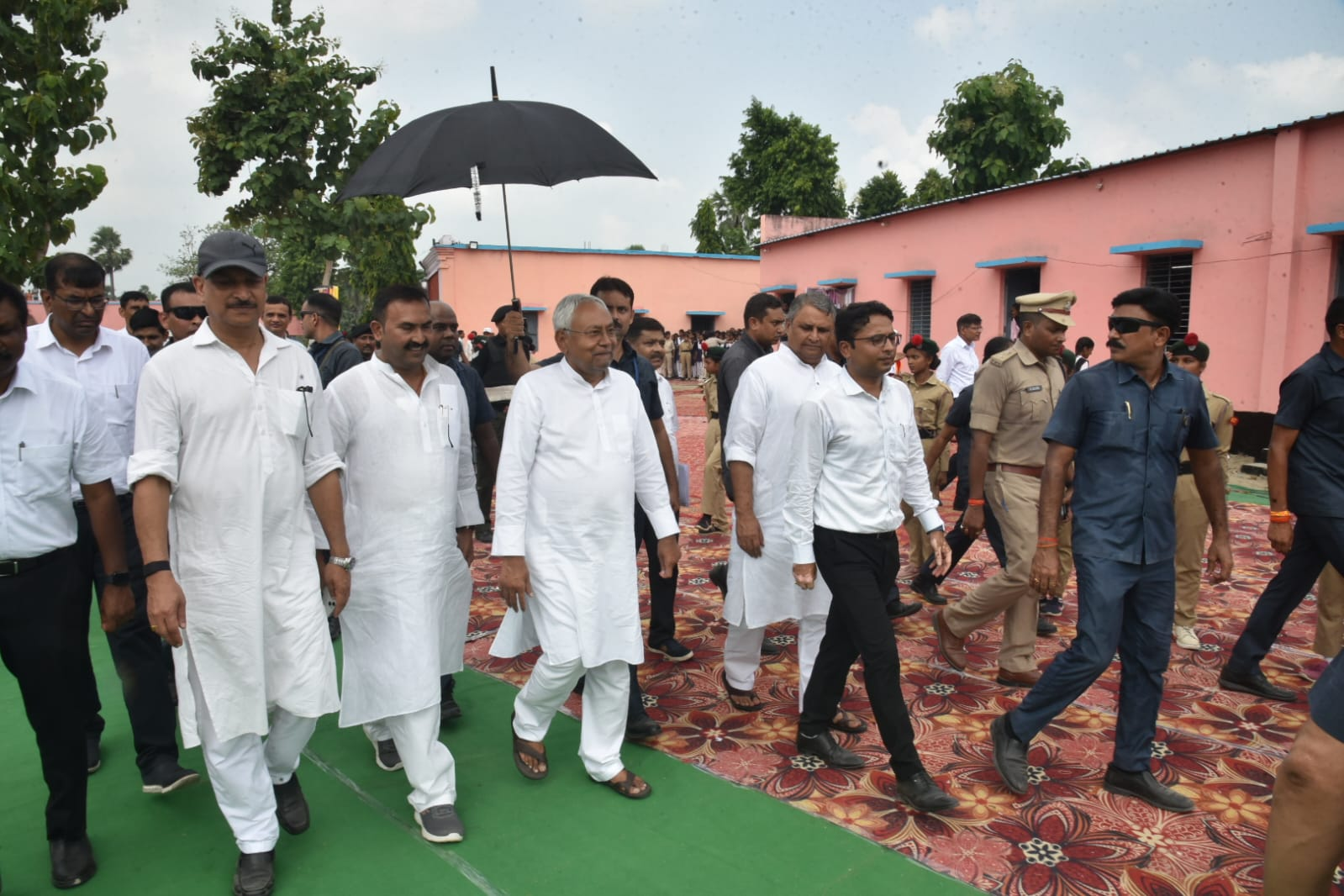
Krishna Kumar Mantoo and Rajiv Pratap Rudy with Nitish Kumar participating in inauguration ceremony of girls' hostel in a government school located in Amnour Assembly constituency on 12 September 2024

Mantoo's political career started from a very young age as student leader to later becoming Mukhiya (elected representative of village in Panchayati raj system) of Banauta village in early 2000s. In the subsequent years he gained popularity as a regional "Bahubali", who conflicted local administrators and politicians at multiple instances. Mantoo allowed his wife Savita Devi to contest panchayat elections after the seats were reserved for SCs and women, emerging youth leader's wife got victory in 2006 Block Pramukh's [Block President] election and later the position is reclaimed by his wife in the consecutive elections in 2011, 2016, 2021 and has been continuously serving the post as of 2024. While his presence in the local politics was not left unnoticed and in the subsequent time he became close ally with Prabhunath Singh, who is credited with his entry into active state politics. Due to support of Prabhunath Singh, he was able to get symbol from Janata Dal (United) for 2010 Bihar Legislative Assembly elections. He won his first assembly election by defeating Sunil Kumar with a huge margin of over ten thousand, becoming one of the youngest MLAs of the region. In his first tenure as legislator, multiple allegations related to intimidation of government officials against him. Allegation of extortion and physical threats were charged against him in the election year 2015.

In 2015, he contested Assembly elections once again and lost to Shatrughan Tiwari of Bharatiya Janata Party. Later, in 2020, he joined Bharatiya Janata Party after resigning from Janata Dal United which was contesting election in alliance with Bharatiya Janta Party and contested the 2020 Bihar Legislative Assembly election. He defeated Sunil Kumar of Rashtriya Janata Dal and became an MLA for the second time.

== Elections contested ==
=== Assembly Elections 2010 ===
2010 Bihar Legislative Assembly election: Amnour
Party	Candidate	Votes	%	±%
JD(U)	Krishna Kumar Mantoo	29,508	31	
Independent	Sunil Kumar	18,991	20	
Majority		10,517	11	

=== Assembly Elections 2015 ===
2015 Bihar Legislative Assembly election: Amnour
Party	Candidate	Votes	%	±%
BJP	Shatrudhan Tiwari	39,134	30	
JD(U)	Krishna Kumar Mantoo	33,883	26	
Majority		5,251	4	

=== Assembly Elections 2020 ===
2020 Bihar Legislative Assembly election: Amnour
Party	Candidate	Votes	%	±%
BJP	Krishna Kumar Mantoo	63,316	42.29	
RJD	Sunil Kumar	59,635	39.83	
Majority		3,681	2.46	

== Positions held ==
Period	Positions	Note
2010–2015	Member, Bihar Legislative Assembly	First Term
2020–2025	Member, Bihar Legislative Assembly	Second Term
2025-	Member, Bihar Legislative Assembly	Third Term

== See also ==
- Maha Nand Singh
- Arun Singh Kushwaha
- Shri Bhagwan Singh Kushwaha
- Awadhesh Singh
- Fateh Bahadur Kushwaha
- Ajit Kushwaha
- Ajay Kumar Kushwaha
- Ravindra Singh Kushwaha
- Nisha Singh
- Niranjan Kumar Mehta
