= Ashok Yadav =

Indian politician

Member of the Bihar Legislative Council
- Incumbent
- Assumed office 2022
- Constituency: Nawada Local Authorities

Personal details
- Born: Nawada district, Bihar
- Party: Janta Dal United
- Relations: Raj Ballabh Yadav (Uncle); Vibha Yadav (Aunty)

Ashok Yadav is a leader of the Janta Dal United and a member of the Bihar Legislative Council from Nawada. He is a nephew of former member of the Bihar Legislative Assembly from Nawada constituency, Raj Ballabh Yadav.

== See also ==
- Nawada Assembly constituency
- Raj Ballabh Yadav
- Vibha Yadav
