= Raj Ballabh Yadav =

Indian politician

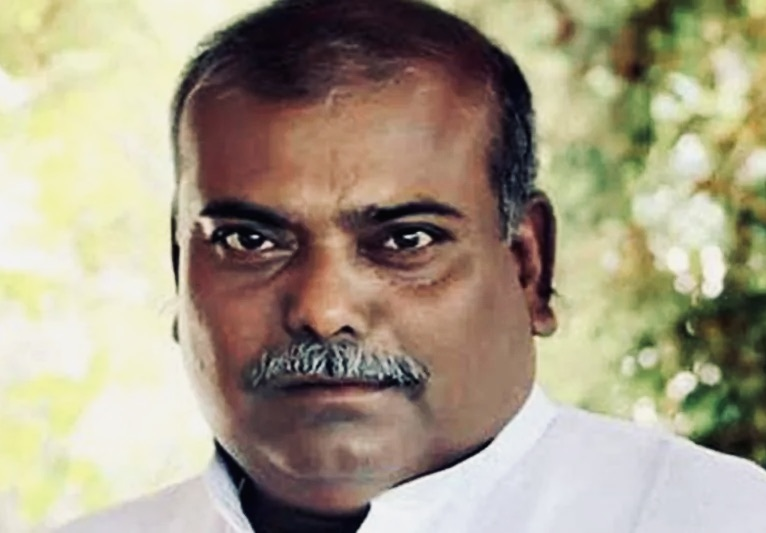

Member of Bihar Legislative Assembly
- In office 2015–2018
- Preceded by: Purnima Yadav
- Succeeded by: Vibha Devi Yadav
- Constituency: Nawada
- In office 1995 To 2005
- Succeeded by: Purnima Yadav
- Constituency: Nawada

Member of Bihar Legislative Assembly
- Preceded by: Krishna Prasad Yadav

Personal details
- Born: Nawada, Bihar
- Party: BJP
- Relatives: Vibha Devi Yadav (Wife) Ashok Yadav (Nephew)
- Profession: Politician

Raj Ballabh Yadav is an Indian politician from Bihar, known for his association with the Rashtriya Janata Dal (RJD). He served as the Member of the Legislative Assembly (MLA) from the Nawada Assembly constituency for three terms. His political career ended after his conviction in a high-profile rape case and his alleged involvement in sex trafficking.

== Political career ==
Raj Ballabh Yadav came from an established political family in the Nawada region of Bihar. His father, Jehal Prasad, was the Zila Parishad President in Nawada district. His elder brother, Krishna Prasad Yadav, served as the MLA from Nawada from 1990 to 1995 and the MLA from the Gobindpur constituency from 1995 to 2000, before his death in a road accident. The political background of his family helped Raj Bhallabh Yadav consolidate influence within the Rashtriya Janata Dal (RJD) and rise as a prominent regional leader. He was elected multiple times to the Bihar Legislative Assembly, where he built a reputation as a strong grassroots organiser with significant influence in local political structures.

During his tenure, Yadav was regarded as a prominent figure within the party's regional operations. His political standing, however, was overshadowed by his entanglement in a POCSO rape case in the mid-2010s, which ultimately led to his expulsion from active politics.

Following his conviction for the rape of a minor girl in 2018 and consequent disqualification from office, his wife, Vibha Devi – who had no prior political experience and was widely reported to be illiterate – was fielded by the RJD to contest his former seat. She won the Nawada Assembly constituency in the 2020 election, effectively continuing the family's political hold over the area.

== Conviction for the rape of a minor ==
On 15 December 2018, Raj Ballabh Yadav, while still the sitting MLA from the Nawada Assembly constituency, was convicted by a special court for the rape of a minor girl at his home. During the case, the minor claimed that she was sold to Yadav for a sum of ₹30,000 and taken to Yadav's house, where she was forced to drink alcohol, watch pornography, and raped. The case, registered under the Protection of Children from Sexual Offences (POCSO) Act, had drawn widespread public attention and nationwide media coverage. The court found him guilty on multiple charges and sentenced him to life imprisonment.

Following his conviction, Yadav was disqualified from holding public office and suspended by the Rashtriya Janata Dal. The case had substantial political repercussions, including increased scrutiny of candidate selection processes in Bihar and intensified criticism of the political influence exercised by local strongmen and criminals.

In August 2025, Yadav was acquitted of all charges by the Patna High Court due to "lack of evidence". The judgement drew considerable attention in Bihar, as the case had been one of the most widely reported criminal proceedings involving an elected representative. Several news outlets began describing the acquittal as unexpected and politically influenced, noting that the earlier conviction under the POCSO Act had been considered legally significant and had led to his disqualification from an MLA post. The reversal prompted renewed debate about the handling of high-profile criminal cases, the evidentiary standards applied in appeals, and the broader issue of politicians with serious criminal charges re-entering public life.

In February 2016, Yadav was booked for raping a minor girl at his home. On 15 December 2018, he was convicted of the offence under the POCSO Act 2012 and sentenced to life imprisonment, as well as being fined ₹50,000. He has since been suspended from the RJD. His wife Vibha Devi won the Bihar assembly election from Nawada constituency in the year 2020 and again in 2025.

== Other controversies ==
=== Political fallout from association with Yadav (2018–2020) ===
Prior to conviction, when allegations first emerged, there was significant media and political backlash against the Rashtriya Janata Dal (RJD), the party which Yadav represented, for continuing to associate with him. For example, during a public rally in Nawada district in 2018, supporters put up posters featuring Raj Ballabh Yadav despite the ongoing trial, prompting strong criticism from rival parties and activists.

The controversy over the posters reportedly forced his party leadership to respond, and it sparked questions about candidate-selection standards and the culture of "criminal-politician rehabilitation" in Bihar politics.

=== Derogatory remarks about another politician's wife (2025) ===
In September 2025, a video clip purportedly of Raj Ballabh Yadav went viral, in which he allegedly made a derogatory comment about the wife of Tejashwi Yadav. He is reported to have said that Tejashwi "did not deem a girl from the community to be fit to become his wife, perhaps he was looking for a 'jersey cattle'." This sparked widespread outrage. The remarks triggered protests by women's-wing activists of the Rashtriya Janata Dal (RJD) in Nawada, including the burning of his effigy.

The controversy heightened tensions between him and his former party, and raised serious criticism about misogyny, especially given his prior criminal record on sexual offences.

=== Re-entry into politics after release from prison (2025) ===
After being acquitted in a POCSO-related case, Raj Ballabh Yadav reportedly attempted to re-activate his political career in his home district of Nawada. This revival stirred controversy because many saw it as an example of "criminal-background politicians" attempting to regain influence, possibly undermining the seriousness of past convictions. The episode also sparked debate about the ethics and accountability of political parties when dealing with individuals with criminal histories, especially offences involving sexual violence.
