= Gayatri Devi Yadav =

Indian politician (1943–2023)

Member of the Bihar Legislative Assembly
- In office 1970–1972
- Preceded by: Yugal Kishore Yadav
- Succeeded by: Amrit Prasad
- Constituency: Gobindpur
- In office 1972–1977
- Preceded by: Gaurishanker Keshari
- Succeeded by: Ganesh Shanker Vidyarthi
- Constituency: Nawada
- In office 1980–1995
- Preceded by: Bhatu Mahto
- Succeeded by: K.B. Prasad
- Constituency: Gobindpur
- In office 2000–2005
- Preceded by: K.B. Prasad
- Succeeded by: Kaushal Yadav
- Constituency: Gobindpur

Personal details
- Born: 1943 Govindpur, Nawada, Bihar
- Died: 9 April 2023 (aged 79–80) Patna, Bihar
- Party: Rashtriya Janata Dal
- Other political affiliations: Indian National Congress (before 2000)
- Children: Kaushal Yadav

Gayatri Devi Yadav (1943 - 9 April 2023) was an Indian politician. She was elected to the Bihar Legislative Assembly. She was elected from Gobindpur constituency as well as Nawada constituency in several times from 1970 to 2005 in a career spanning over 30 years. Her son Kaushal Yadav was also elected to Bihar Assembly from Gobindpur. She was a long-term member of the Indian National Congress from 1970 to 2000 then she joined Rashtriya Janata Dal in 2000. She died on 9 April 2023, in Patna, Bihar.
