= Gobindpur Assembly constituency =

Constituency of the Bihar legislative assembly in India

- Constituency No. - for the Bihar Legislative Assembly

Constituency details
- Country: India
- Region: East India
- State: Bihar
- District: Nawada
- Established: 1967
- Total electors: 315,221

Member of Legislative Assembly
- 18th Bihar Legislative Assembly
- Incumbent Binita Mehta
- Party: LJP(RV)
- Alliance: NDA
- Elected year: 2025

Gobindpur Assembly constituency is an assembly constituency for Bihar Legislative Assembly in Nawada district of Bihar, India. It comes under Nawada (Lok Sabha constituency).

== Members of the Legislative Assembly ==
Year	Member	Party
1967	Amrit Prasad	Indian National Congress
1969	Yugal Kishore Yadav	Lok Tantrik Congress
1970^	Gayatri Devi Yadav	Independent
1972	Amrit Prasad	Indian National Congress
1977	Bhatu Mahto	Janata Party
1980	Gayatri Devi Yadav	Indian National Congress (I)
1985	Gayatri Devi Yadav	Indian National Congress
1990	Gayatri Devi Yadav	Indian National Congress
1995	Krishna Prasad Yadav	Janata Dal
2000	Gayatri Devi Yadav	Rashtriya Janata Dal
2005	Kaushal Yadav	Independent
2005	Kaushal Yadav	Independent
2010	Kaushal Yadav	Janata Dal (United)
2015	Purnima Yadav	Indian National Congress
2020	Md Kamran	Rashtriya Janata Dal
2025	Binita Mehta	Lok Janshakti Party (Ram Vilas)

== Election results ==
=== 2025 ===
Detailed Results at: https://results.eci.gov.in/ResultAcGenNov2025/ConstituencywiseS04238.htm

2025 Bihar Legislative Assembly election: Gobindpur
Party	Candidate	Votes	%	±%
LJP(RV)	Binita Mehta	72,581	40.12	
RJD	Purnima Yadav	49,675	27.46	−21.75
Independent	Md Kamran	39,813	22.01	
JSP	Poonam Kumari	3,917	2.17	
Independent	Surjeet Kumar	3,611	2.0	
SBSP	Mukesh Ram	2,965	1.64	
Independent	Rahul Kumar	1,657	0.92	
NOTA	None of the above	4,404	2.43	−0.45
Majority		22,906	12.66	−7.8
Turnout		180,900	57.39	+6.73
LJP(RV) gain from RJD		Swing		

=== 2020 ===
2020 Bihar Legislative Assembly election: Gobindpur
Party	Candidate	Votes	%	±%
RJD	Mohammed Kamran	79,557	49.21	
JD(U)	Purnima Yadav	46,483	28.75	
LJP	Ranjeet Yadav	16,111	9.96	
Independent	Ram Yatna Singh	3,797	2.35	
Rajnaitik Chetna Dal	Anand Priya Deo	3,110	1.92	
Independent	Dilip Kumar	1,919	1.19	
Independent	Dinesh Singh Chandravansi	1,546	0.96	
NOTA	None of the above	4,657	2.88	−0.97
Majority		33,074	20.46	+17.33
Turnout		161,682	50.66	+2.27
RJD gain from INC		Swing		

=== 2015 ===
2015 Bihar Legislative Assembly election: Gobindpur
Party	Candidate	Votes	%	±%
INC	Purnima Yadav	43,016	30.58	
BJP	Fula Devi	38,617	27.45	
Independent	Md Kamran	32,646	23.21	
Independent	Sarwan Kumar	8,469	6.02	
Independent	Ramchandra Rajwar	4,280	3.04	
Independent	Satendra Mochi	2,093	1.49	
BSP	Mokim Uddin	1,633	1.16	
CPI	Ram Krishna Mahto	1,614	1.15	
Independent	Shankar Prasad	1,480	1.05	
Moolniwasi Samaj Party	Vijay Ram	1,400	1.0	
NOTA	None of the above	5,411	3.85	
Majority		4,399	3.13	
Turnout		140,659	48.39	
