= Shambhu Nath Singh Yadav =

Indian politician

Member of Bihar Legislative Assembly
- Incumbent
- Assumed office 2015
- Preceded by: Dilmarni Devi
- Constituency: Brahampur

Personal details
- Born: Shambhu Nath Singh Yadav; 28 May 1964 (age 62) Village-Chakki Lahna Bhola Dera P.S. Brahampur, Buxar, Bihar
- Party: Rashtriya Janata Dal
- Education: Matric
- Profession: Politician, social worker

Shambhu Nath Singh Yadav is an Indian politician. He was elected to the Bihar Legislative Assembly from Brahampur as a Member of Bihar Legislative Assembly as a member of the Rashtriya Janata Dal. Before starting in politics, Yadav worked as a constable in Bihar Police from 1983 to 2009.
