= Binita Mehta =

Indian politician

Member of the Bihar Legislative Assembly
- Incumbent
- Assumed office 14 November 2025
- Constituency: Gobindpur Assembly constituency

Personal details
- Party: Lok Janshakti Party (Ram Vilas)
- Profession: Politician

Binita Mehta is an Indian politician from Bihar. She is a member of the Bihar Legislative Assembly from Gobindpur Assembly constituency in Nawada district. She won the 2025 Bihar Legislative Assembly election representing the Lok Janshakti Party (Ram Vilas). She defeated Purnima Devi of Rashtriya Janata Dal by a margin of 22,906 votes.

== Political career ==
Mehta has served as Zila Parishad member of Roh bloc. She belongs to a political family and her husband Anil Mehta is the district unit president of Bharatiya Janata Party for Nawada district. With her political background with National Democratic Alliance, she was declared the candidate of Lok Janshakti Party (Ram Vilas) prior to Bihar Legislative Assembly elections of 2025 from Gobindpur Assembly constituency of Nawada district.

She defeated RJD candidate Purnima Yadav with a margin of over 22,000 votes in this election.
