= Anand Bhushan Pandey =

Indian politician

Anand Bhushan Pandey was member of the Bharatiya Janata Party from Bihar. He has won the Bihar Legislative Assembly election in 2015 from Bhabua. He died on 30 November 2017.
