= Majorganj Assembly constituency =

Coordinates: 26°43′47″N 85°29′16″E

Majorganj
- Former constituency for the Bihar Legislative Assembly

Constituency details
- Country: India
- Region: East India
- State: Bihar
- District: Sitamarhi
- Lok Sabha constituency: Sheohar
- Established: 1962
- Abolished: 2010

Majorganj Assembly constituency was an assembly constituency in Sitamarhi district in the Indian state of Bihar. It was reserved for scheduled castes.

== Overview ==
It was part of Sheohar Lok Sabha constituency.

As a consequence of the orders of the Delimitation Commission of India, Majorganj Assembly constituency ceased to exist in 2010.

== Members of Vidhan Sabha ==
Year	Member	Party
1962	Ram Swaroop Ram	Indian National Congress
1967	Ramvruksh Ram	Samyukta Socialist Party
1969	Ramvruksh Ram	Samyukta Socialist Party
1972	Surendra Ram	Indian National Congress
1977	Surendra Ram	Janata Party
1980	Ramvruksh Ram	Indian National Congress (I)
1985	Ramvruksh Ram	Indian National Congress
1990	Gauri Shankar Nagdansh	Janata Dal
1995	Surendra Ram	Janata Dal
2000	Gauri Shankar Nagdansh	Bharatiya Janata Party
2005	Dinkar Ram	Bharatiya Janata Party
2005	Dinkar Ram	Bharatiya Janata Party
2010 onwards: Constituency does not exist

== See also ==
- Majorganj (community development block)
