= Purnima Yadav =

Indian politician

Purnima Yadav (born 1977) is an Indian politician from Bihar. She was a former member of the Bihar Legislative Assembly from Gobindpur Assembly constituency in Nawada district. She won the 2015 Bihar Legislative Assembly election representing Indian National Congress.

== Early life and education ==
Yadav is from Gobindpur, Nawada district, Bihar. She married Kaushal Yadav. She completed her MA at Magadh University, Bodh Gaya in 1994. Earlier, she did BA Honours at Magadh University Bodh Gaya in 1990.

== Career ==
Yadav won from Gobindpur Assembly constituency representing the Indian National Congress in the 2015 Bihar Legislative Assembly election. She polled 43,016 votes and defeated her nearest rival, Fula Devi of the Bharatiya Janata Party, by a margin of 4,399 votes.
