= Anita Devi =

Anita Devi may refer to:

- Anita Devi (sport shooter)
- Anita Devi (politician)
