= Sanjay Kumar =

Sanjay Kumar may refer to: ' sanjay kumar (bron 1978), rajmenister government of India father name raghunandan

- Sanjay Kumar (activist) (born 1976), Indian homeless advocate
- Sanjay Kumar (business executive) (born 1962), Chairman and CEO of Computer Associates International
- Sanjay Kumar (professor), director of Centre for the Study of Developing Societies
- Sanjay Kumar (soldier) (born 1976), Indian Army soldier who received the Param Vir Chakra
- Sanjay Kumar (wrestler, born 1983), Indian Greco-Roman wrestler
- Sanjay Kumar (wrestler, born 1967), Indian freestyle wrestler
- Sanjay Kumar (civil servant), Indian Administrative Service officer
- Bandi Sanjay Kumar (born 1971), Indian politician

== See also ==
- Sanjay Kumar Singh (disambiguation)
