= Sanjay Kumar Gupta =

Sanjay Kumar Gupta may refer to:

- Sanjay Kumar Gupta (BJP politician), Indian politician from Kumhrar Assembly constituency
- Sanjay Kumar Gupta (RJD politician), Indian politician from Belsand Assembly constituency

== See also ==
- Sanjay Kumar (disambiguation)
