= Karakat Lok Sabha constituency =

Lok Sabha Constituency in Bihar

Coordinates: 25.2°N 84.3°E

Karakat
- Lok Sabha constituency

Constituency details
- Country: India
- Region: East India
- State: Bihar
- Assembly constituencies: Nokha; Dehri; Karakat; Goh; Obra; Nabinagar
- Established: 2009
- Total electors: 1,569,989
- Reservation: None

Member of Parliament
- 18th Lok Sabha
- Incumbent Raja Ram Singh Kushwaha
- Party: CPI(ML)L
- Alliance: INDIA
- Elected year: 2024

Karakat is one of the 40 Lok Sabha (parliamentary) constituencies in Bihar state in eastern India. This constituency came into existence in 2008 as a part of the implementation of delimitation of parliamentary constituencies based on the recommendations of the Delimitation Commission of India constituted in 2002. Karakat is considered as a Kushwaha dominated constituency.

== Caste and communities ==
The caste data of this constituency shows that there are 2 lakh (200,000) voters belonging to each of Koeri (Kushwaha), Rajput and Yadav communities. For last few elections, the constituency has been a place of contest between Mahabali Singh and Upendra Kushwaha, both belonging to Koeri caste. In 2024 Indian general election, Raja Ram Singh Kushwaha of Communist Party of India (Marxist-Leninist) Liberation won the election in a triangular contest involving Rashtriya Lok Morcha chief Upendra Kushwaha and Bhojpuri singer and actor Pawan Singh.

Due to victory of candidates belonging to only Kushwaha caste from this constituency, ever since its formation, it is referred to as 'Kushwaha land' in Bihar's political circle.

== Assembly segments ==
Presently, Karakat Lok Sabha constituency comprises six Vidhan Sabha (legislative assembly) segments. These are:

#	Name	District	Member	Party	2024 lead
211	Nokha	Rohtas	Nagendra Chandravanshi	JD(U)	CPI(ML)L
212	Dehri	Rohtas	Rajeev Ranjan Singh	LJP(RV)	CPI(ML)L
213	Karakat	Rohtas	Arun Kushwaha	CPI(ML)L	CPI(ML)L
219	Goh	Aurangabad	Amrendra Kumar	RJD	CPI(ML)L
220	Obra	Aurangabad	Prakash Chandra	LJP(RV)	CPI(ML)L
221	Nabinagar	Aurangabad	Chetan Anand	JD(U)	CPI(ML)L

== Members of Parliament ==
Year	Name	Party
Before 2009 : Constituency did not exist
2009	Mahabali Singh Kushwaha	Janata Dal (United)
2014	Upendra Kushwaha	Rashtriya Lok Samata Party
2019	Mahabali Singh Kushwaha	Janata Dal (United)
2024	Raja Ram Singh Kushwaha	Communist Party of India (Marxist-Leninist) Liberation

== Election results ==
Vote share of Winning candidates
2024	36.89%
2019	45.86%
2014	42.90%
2009	34.13%

=== 2024 ===
2024 Indian general election: Karakat
Party	Candidate	Votes	%	±%
CPI(ML)L	Raja Ram Singh Kushwaha	380,581	36.89	▲34.02
IND	Pawan Singh	274,723	26.63	
RLM	Upendra Kushwaha	253,876	24.61	
BSP	Dheeraj Kumar Singh	23,657	2.29	▼0.21
NOTA	None of the Above	21,595	2.09	▼0.45
IND	Raja Ram Singh	21,383	2.07	
AIMIM	Priyanka Prasad Choudhary	11,006	1.07	
IND	Indra Raj Roushan	6,324	0.61	
OTH	6 Other Party Candidates	38,473	3.73	
Majority		105,858	10.26	▲0.53
Turnout		1,033,379	54.73	▲5.64
Swing to CPI(ML)L from JD(U)		Swing		

=== 2019 ===
2019 Indian general election: Karakat
Party	Candidate	Votes	%	±%
JD(U)	Mahabali Singh	398,408	45.86	▲36.15
RLSP	Upendra Kushwaha	313,866	36.13	▼6.77
CPI(ML)L	Raja Ram Singh	24,932	2.87	▼1.27
NOTA	None of the Above	22,104	2.54	▲1.25
BSP	Raj Narayan Tiwari	21,715	2.50	▼3.26
IND	8 Independent Candidates	23,140	2.66	
OTH	15 Other Party Candidates	64,633	7.44	
Majority		84,542	9.73	▼3.59
Turnout		869,546	49.09	▼0.92
Swing to JD(U) from RLSP		Swing		

=== 2014 ===
2014 Indian general election: Karakat
Party	Candidate	Votes	%	±%
RLSP	Upendra Kushwaha	338,892	42.90	
RJD	Kanti Singh	233,651	29.58	▼1.00
JD(U)	Mahabali Singh	76,709	9.71	▼24.42
BSP	Sanjay Kewat	45,503	5.76	▲0.20
CPI(ML)L	Raja Ram Singh	32,686	4.14	▼2.36
NOTA	None of the Above	10,185	1.29	
IND	5 Independent Candidates	27,213	3.45	
OTH	5 Other Party Candidates	25,088	3.18	
Majority		105,241	13.32	▲9.77
Turnout		790,361	50.01	
Swing to RLSP from JD(U)		Swing		

=== 2009 ===
2009 Indian general election: Karakat
Party	Candidate	Votes	%	±%
JD(U)	Mahabali Singh	196,946	34.13	
RJD	Kanti Singh	176,463	30.58	
INC	Awadhesh Kumar Singh	71,057	12.31	
CPI(ML)L	Raja Ram Singh	37,493	6.50	
BSP	Upendra Kumar Sharma	32,074	5.56	
RSWD (Note: Rashtra Sewa Dal)	Jyoti Rashmi	21,114	3.66	
IND	6 Independent Candidates	27,440	4.76	
OTH	4 Other Party Candidates	14,453	2.50	
Majority		20,483	3.55	
Turnout				
JD(U) win (new seat)				

== See also ==
- Rohtas district
- List of constituencies of the Lok Sabha
- Maudihan
