= Rameshwar Chaurasiya =

Indian politician

Member of the Bihar Legislative Assembly
- In office 2000–2015
- Preceded by: Anand Mohan Singh
- Succeeded by: Anita Devi
- Constituency: Nokha

Personal details
- Party: Bharatiya Janata Party (-2020) (2022 -present)
- Other political affiliations: Lok Janshakti Party (2020 - 2022)

Rameshwar Chaurasiya is an Indian politician, and member of the Lok Janshakti Party. Chaurasiya was also a member of the Bihar Legislative Assembly, from the Nokha constituency in Rohtas district, as a member of Bharatiya Janata Party.

In October 2020, Chaurasiya joined Lok Janshakti Party and was given a ticket from Sasaram constituency in 2020 Bihar Legislative Assembly election. In 2022, he rejoins Bharatiya Janata Party.
