= Nokha Assembly constituency =

Nokha Assembly constituency may refer to

- Nokha, Bihar Assembly constituency
- Nokha, Rajasthan Assembly constituency
