= Tulsi Singh Yadav =

Indian politician

Member of Bihar Legislative Assembly
- In office 1995–2000
- Succeeded by: Arun Singh
- Constituency: Karakaat

Member of Bihar Legislative Assembly
- In office 1990
- Preceded by: Shashi Rani Mishra
- Constituency: Karakaat

Member of Bihar Legislative Assembly
- Incumbent
- Assumed office 1967–1969, 1969–1972 and 1980–1985
- Preceded by: Not Exit
- Succeeded by: Self
- Constituency: Karakaat

Personal details
- Born: Tulsi Singh Yadav Rohtas district, Bihar
- Died: 2015 Karakaat, Rohtas district, Bihar
- Party: Rashtriya Janata Dal; Janata Dal; Samyukta Socialist Party
- Profession: Politician, social worker

Tulsi Singh Yadav also Known as Tulsi Singh is an Indian politician. He was elected to the Bihar Legislative Assembly from Karakaat as a member of the Samyukta Socialist Party and Janata Dal in 1967, 1969, 1980, 1990 and 1995. In 2000, Yadav lost Bihar Legislative Assembly to Arun Singh as a member of Rashtriya Janata Dal. He contested 2009 Lok Sabha election from Karakat constituency as a member of Samajwadi Party but lost to Mahabali Singh. Yadav died on 4 November 2015.
