= Sanjay Kumar Singh =

Sanjay Kumar Singh may refer to:

- Sanjay Kumar Singh (BJP politician) (born 1968), MLA from Lalganj, Bihar (Vidhan Sabha constituency)
- Sanjay Kumar Singh (Mahua), MLA from Mahua Assembly constituency, Bihar, 2025–present
- Sanjay Kumar Singh (CPI politician), CPI politician from Bihar
- Sanjay Kumar Singh (RJD politician) (born 1977), elected to the Bihar Legislative Assembly from Karakaat
- Sanjay Kumar Singh (INC politician), MLA from Sheikhpura Assembly constituency, Bihar, 1998–2005
- Sanjay Kumar Singh (LJP politician), elected to the Bihar Legislative Assembly from Simri Bakhtiarpur
- Sanjay Kumar Singh (Bally politician), (born 1969) MLA for Bally Assembly constituency, West Bengal

== See also ==
- Sanjay Singh (disambiguation)
- Sanjay Kumar (disambiguation)
