= Gargi Yadav =

Indian freestyle wrestler

Personal information
- Nationality: Indian
- Born: Meerut, Uttar Pradesh, India
- Occupation: Freestyle wrestler
- Employer: Indian Railways

Sport
- Country: India
- Sport: Wrestling
- Weight class: 65 kg
- Event: Freestyle wrestling

Achievements and titles
- Commonwealth finals: Silver (2016, 2017 Commonwealth Wrestling Championships)
Achievements and titles
	Women's freestyle wrestling
Silver medal – second place	Commonwealth Wrestling Championships	2016 Singapore
Silver medal – second place	Commonwealth Wrestling Championships	2017 Johannesburg

Gargi Yadav is an Indian freestyle wrestler from Meerut, Uttar Pradesh. She won the silver medal in the 65 kg event at the 2017 Commonwealth Wrestling Championship, held at Johannesburg, South Africa. She also won a silver medal at the 2016 Commonwealth Wrestling Championship held in Singapore. She has represented the North Eastern Railway (NER) in domestic competitions.

She received the Rani Lakshmi Bai Award from the Government of Uttar Pradesh in 2017.

== Career ==
Yadav made her international debut at the 2008 Junior Female World Wrestling Championship held in Istanbul, Turkey. In 2009, she won a silver medal at the Junior Asian Female Wrestling Championship held in the Philippines. In 2008, Yadav won a bronze medal at the Sub-Junior Female Wrestling Championship held in Tashkent, Uzbekistan, followed by another bronze medal at the Asian Junior Female Wrestling Championship held in Doha, Qatar.

In 2011, she won a bronze medal at the Shaheed Bhagat Singh Memorial Wrestling Tournament held in Jalandhar. In 2012, she finished fifth at the First Hariram Memorial International Prize Money Wrestling Tournament held in Delhi. Yadav won silver medals at the Commonwealth Wrestling Championship held in Singapore in 2016 and in South Africa in 2017.

== Awards ==
In 2016, Gargi was honoured with the Yash Bharti Award, the highest civilian honour conferred by the Government of Uttar Pradesh. In 2017, she received the Rani Lakshmi Bai Award from the Uttar Pradesh government for her contribution in sorts.
