= Muhammad Umar (wrestler) =

Pakistani wrestler

Muhammad Umar Pehlwan محمد عمر پہلوان Title: Rustam-e-Pak-o-Hind خطاب: رُستمِ پاک و ہند
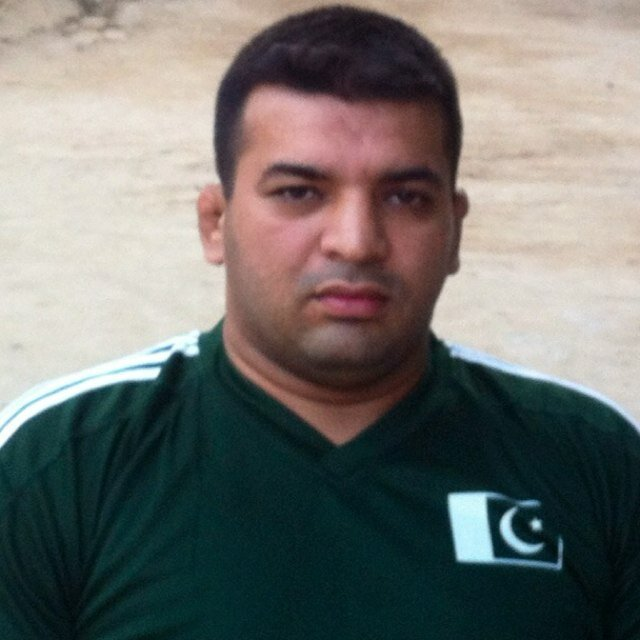

Personal information
- Nationality: Pakistani (پاکستانی)🇵🇰
- Born: 21 April 1975 (age 51) Gujranwala, Punjab, Pakistan
- Height: 1.68 m (5 ft 6 in)
- Weight: 96 kg (212 lb)

Sport
- Sport: Wrestling (کُشتی)
- Event: Greco-Roman & Free style & Traditional
- Club: Jinnah Health Club جناح ہیلتھ کلب
- Coached by: Ch. Shabbir Hussain Lala Muhammad Anwar
Medal record
| Event | 1st | 2nd | 3rd |
|---|---|---|---|
| South Asian Games | 4 | 2 | 0 |
| Commonwealth Games | 0 | 0 | 1 |
| Commonwealth Wrestling Championships | 0 | 2 | 4 |
| Total | 4 | 4 | 5 |
South Asian Games
| Gold medal – first place | 1993 Dhaka | 68 kg |
| Gold medal – first place | 2004 Islamabad | 96 kg |
| Gold medal – first place | 2006 Colombo | 96 kg |
| Gold medal – first place | 2010 Dhaka | 96 kg |
| Silver medal – second place | 1995 Madras | 82 kg |
| Silver medal – second place | 1999 Kathmandu | 85 kg |
Commonwealth Games
| Bronze medal – third place | 1994 Victoria | 68 kg |
Commonwealth Wrestling Championships
| Silver medal – second place | 1993 Victoria | 62 kg |
| Bronze medal – third place | 2007 London | 96 kg |
| Silver medal – second place | 2009 Jalandhar | 96 kg |
| Bronze medal – third place | 2009 Jalandhar | 96 kg |
| Bronze medal – third place | 2011 Melbourne | 96 kg |
| Bronze medal – third place | 2011 Melbourne | 96 kg |

Muhammad Umar Pehlwan (Urdu: محمد عمر پہلوان; born 21 April 1975) is a Pakistani (پاکستانی) freestyle, Greco-Roman and traditional wrestler. His nickname is Rustam (رُستم).

He was given Best Player of the Year Award by the Government of Pakistan in 2009. He won four gold medals in 1993, 2004, 2006 and 2010, at the South Asian Games. He also won two silver medals in 1995 and 1999 at the South Asian Games, He won a bronze medal in the 1994 Commonwealth Games in Victoria, Canada.

He won two silver medals at the 1993 and 2009 Commonwealth Wrestling Championships. He also won bronze medals at the 2007, 2009 and 2011, Commonwealth Wrestling Championships. He became national champion at the senior level in 1991. The same year, he had his international debut at the senior level. He has also been active in traditional mud wrestling (دیسی کُشتی) where he has won Rustam-e-Gujranwala Division, Rustam-e-Punjab, Rustam Pak-o-Hind and Hind Kesari titles.

He won gold medals in Senior Pakistan National Wrestling Championship and National Games 1991 to 2010. He has been regularly representing Pakistan in international championships and tournaments at freestyle and Greco-Roman wrestling from 1991 to 2011 and won many medals. He serves as a wrestler in Gepco, Wapda.

== Family background ==
Muhammad Umar Pehlwan belongs to a well-known family of wrestlers in Gujranwala, Pakistan.

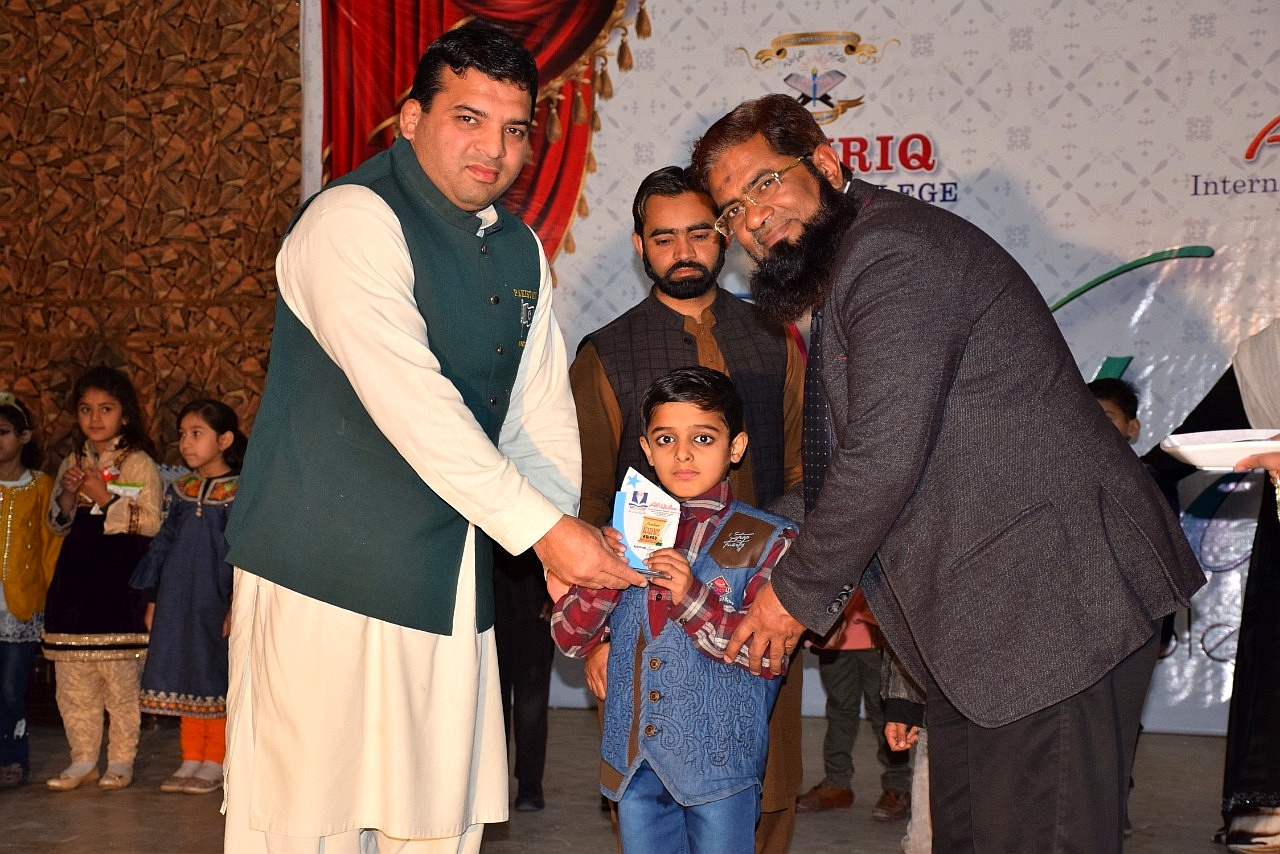
Giving prize to student

His grandfather was Pir Muhammad Pehlwan who started wrestling at the age of 15 years in 1905 in his home city. He fought with a famous wrestlers in the Indian sub-continent.

His father is Lala Muhammad Anwar. He started wrestling at the age of 16 years in 1964 in Gujranwala, Punjab, Pakistan.He won three gold medals in Punjab province wrestling championship and won a silver medal in Pakistan national wrestling championship.

His four wrestler brothers set a record in Pakistan wrestling history by winning gold medals in the National Wrestling Championships. The Pakistani people call the four brothers by the name of Rustam Brothers.

== Personal life ==
Muhammad Umar Pehlwan Married in 2008. He has two children.

== Career ==
He started wrestling in 1985 when he was 10 years old, under the supervision of his father Lala Muhammad Anwar and his coach Ch. Shabeer Hussain. Before that he tried his luck in boxing. When he joined the Jinnah Health Wrestling Club, his weight was 32 kilograms. At age 13, he competed in the 38 kg in the Under-16 National Wrestling Championship in 1988 and won position. At the age of 15, Pehlwan won his first gold medal in the 48 kg class at the Senior National Wrestling Championships in 1991—a record in the history of Pakistan wrestling. He took part in the Senior Asian Wrestling Championships in 1991 which was his first international contest.

Pehlwan won gold medals at the National Wrestling Championships and National Games in Pakistan for 20 consecutive years from 1991 to 2010 and won countless medals while representing Pakistan in 55 countries with the national wrestling team.

== Images ==
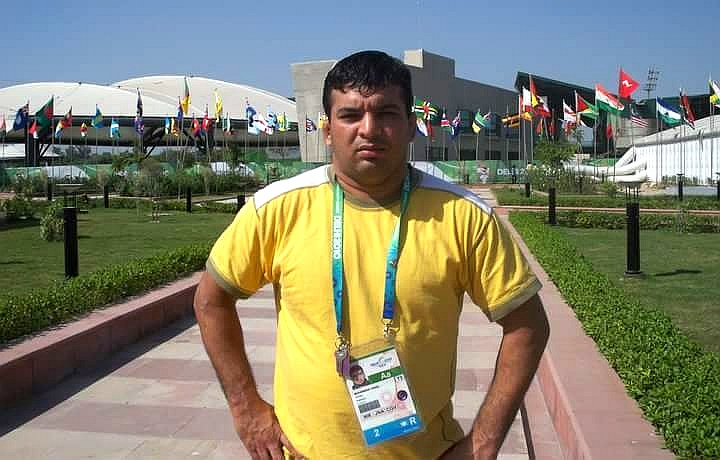

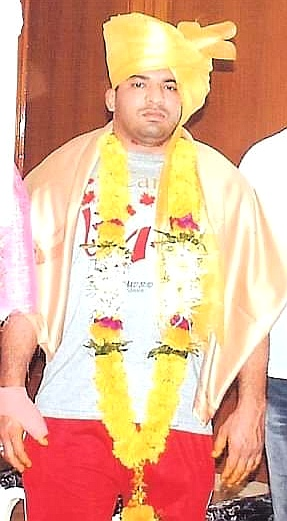

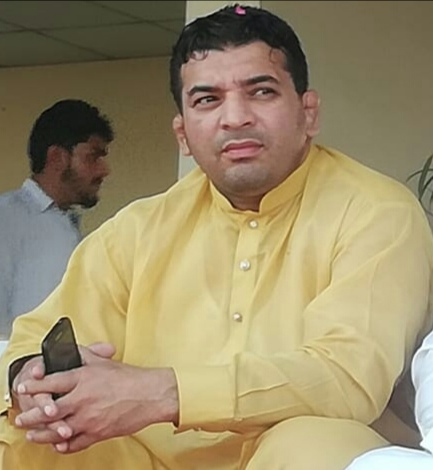

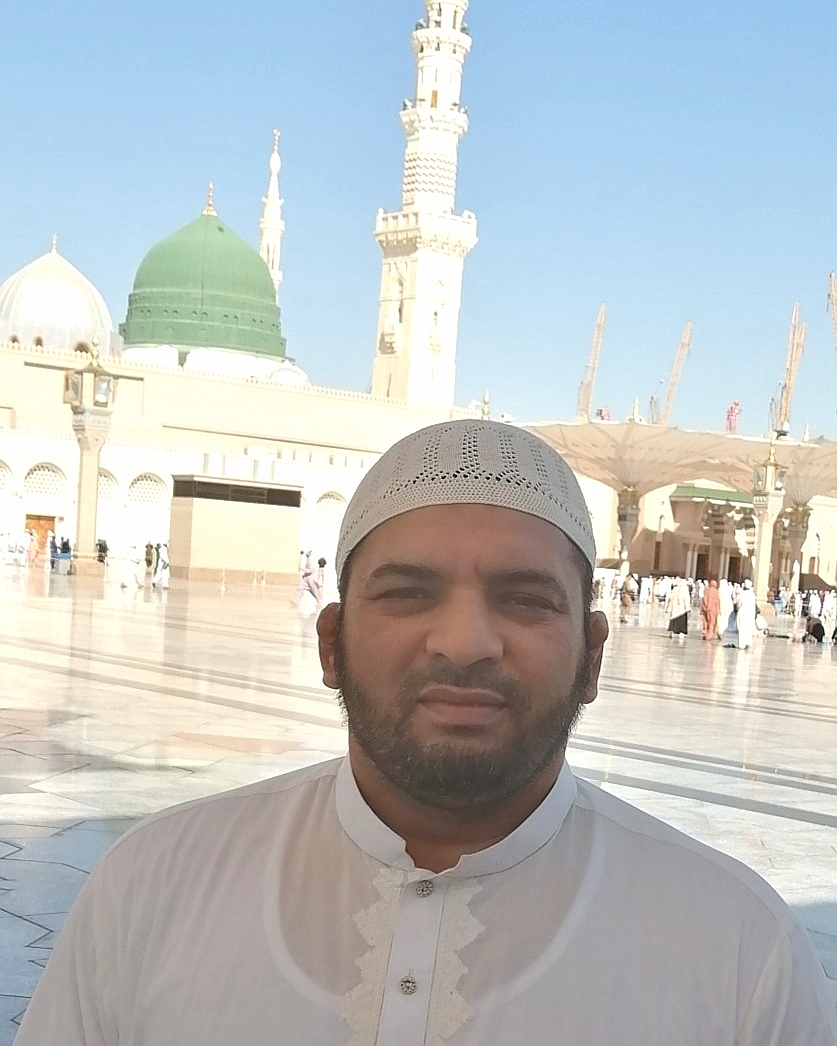

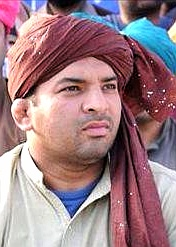

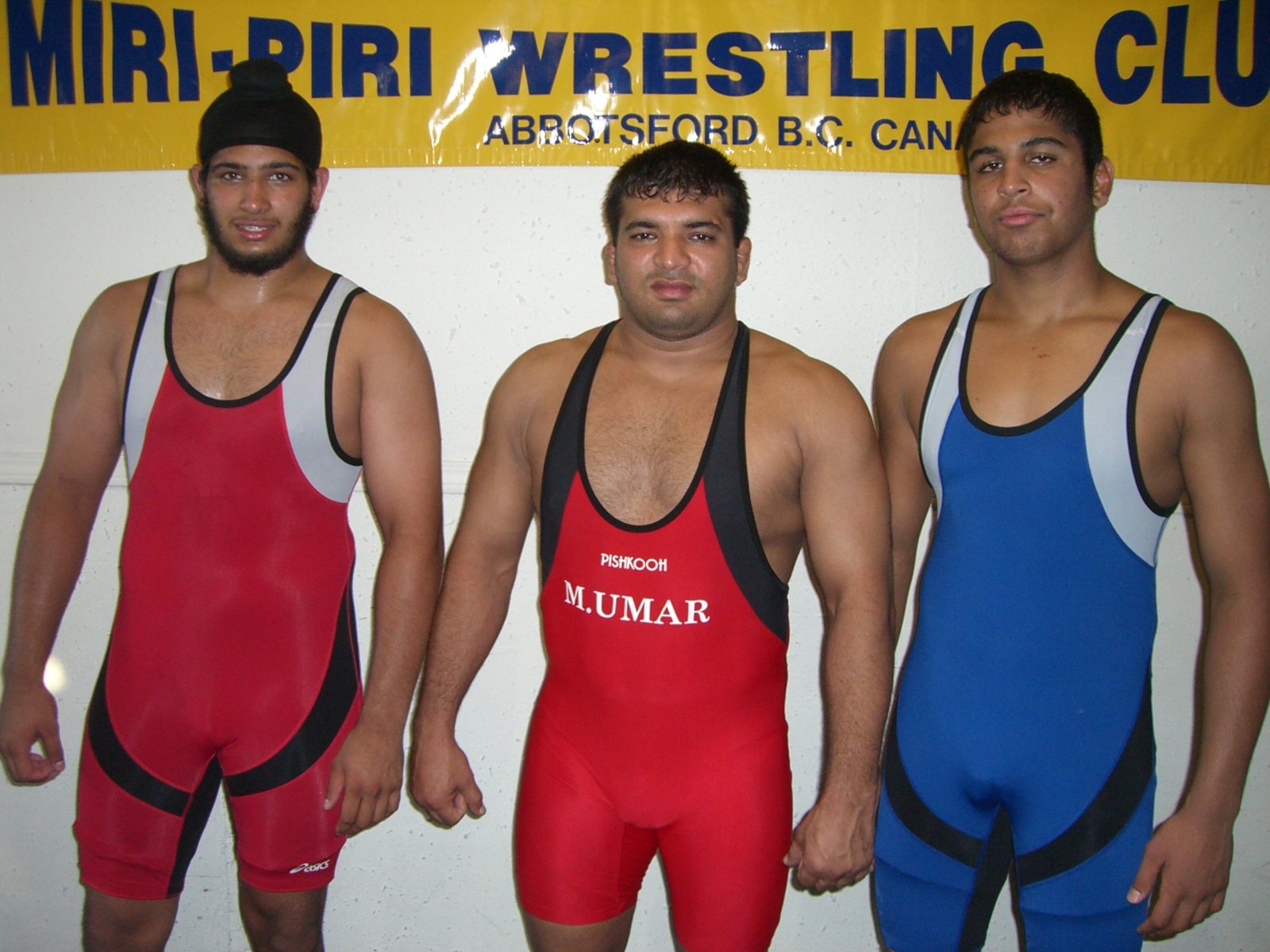
Muhammad umar pehlwan

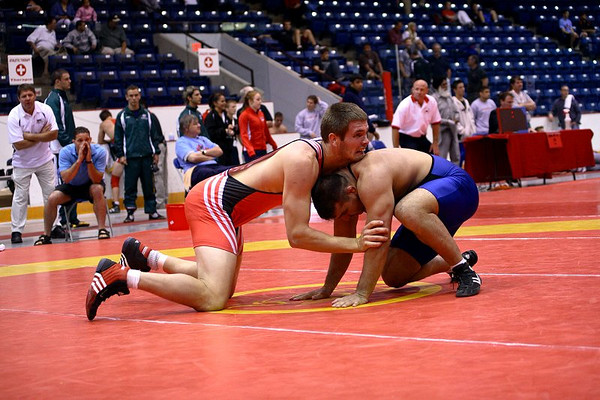
During wrestling competition

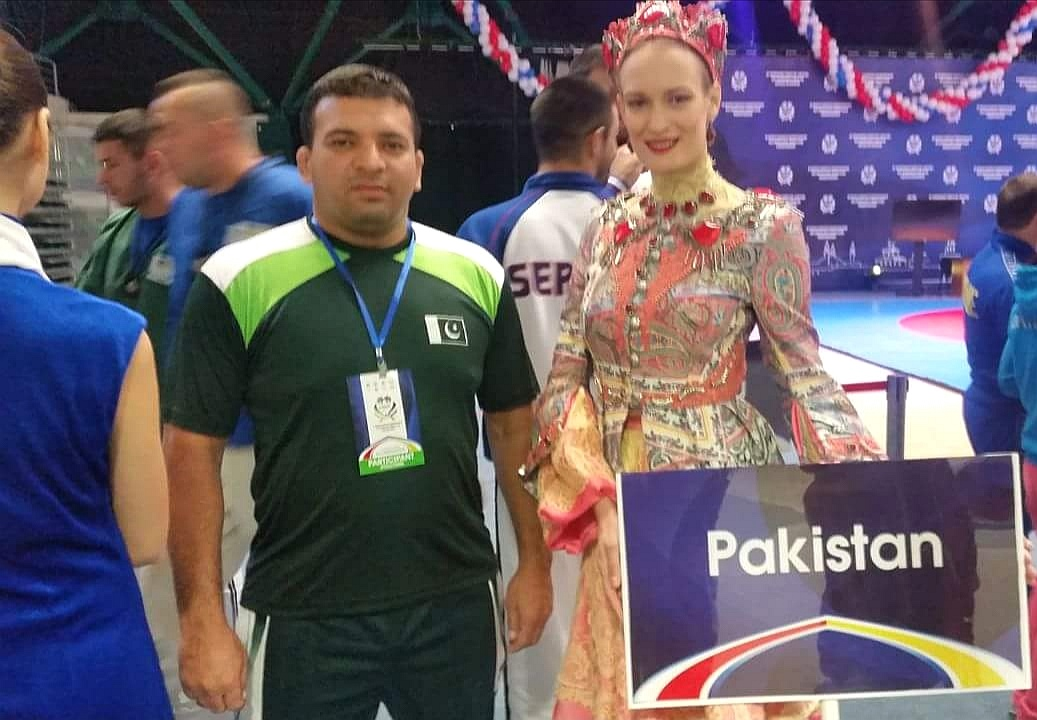
Representing Pakistan

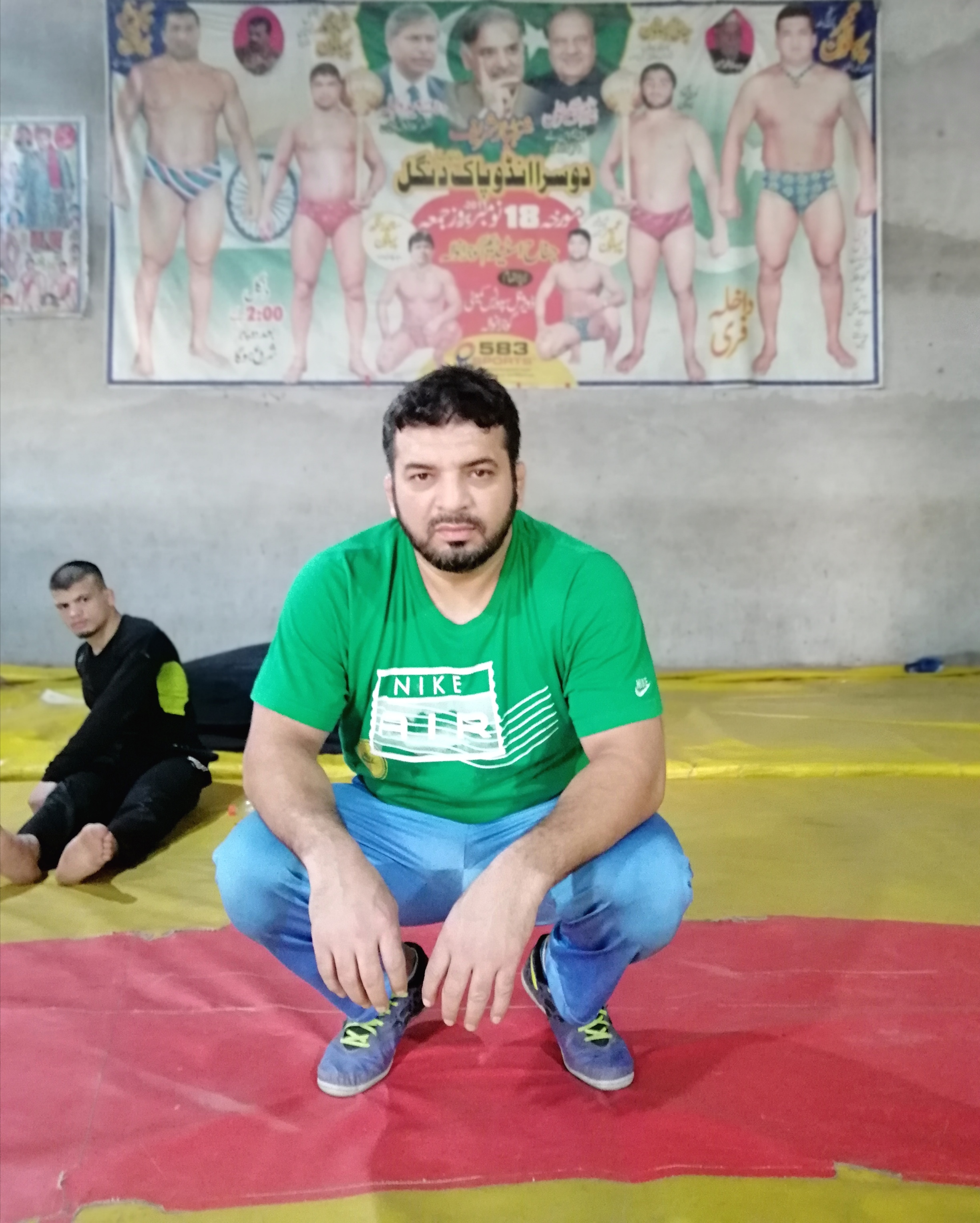
At jinnah health club during practice session...

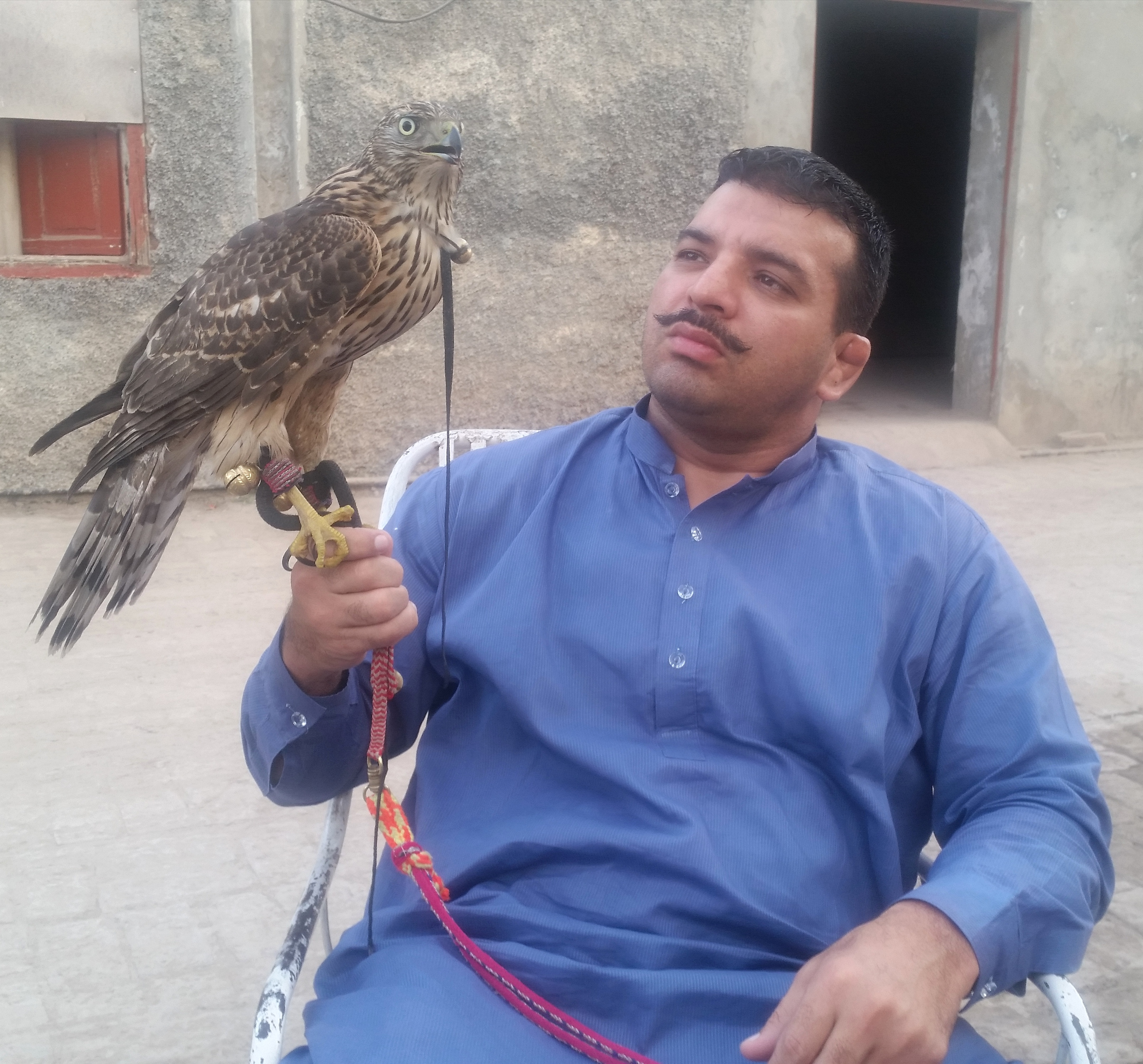
In happy mood at jinnah health club....

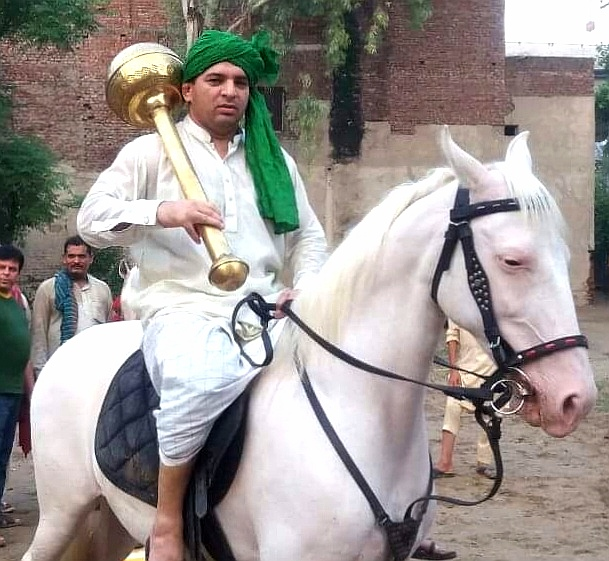
happy independence day

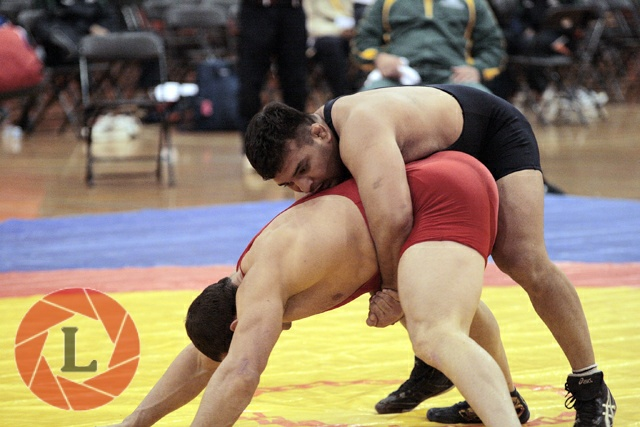
winning moment.....

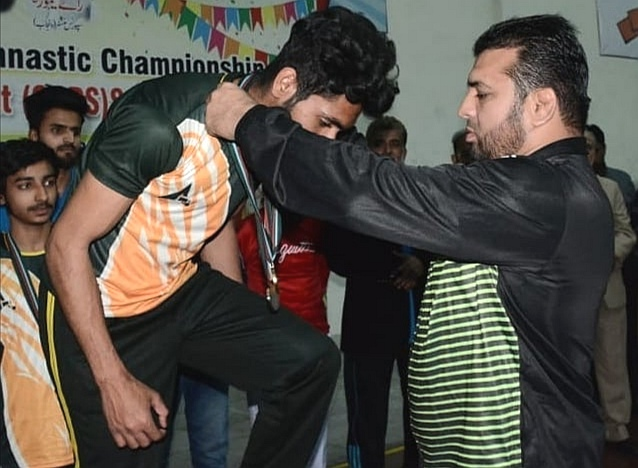
At prize distribution ceremony

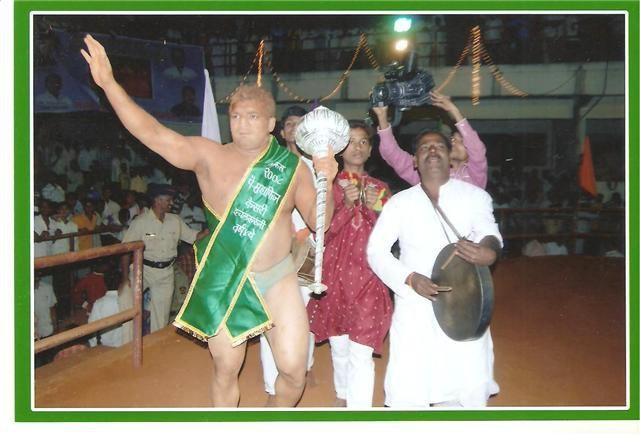
In india....won the title

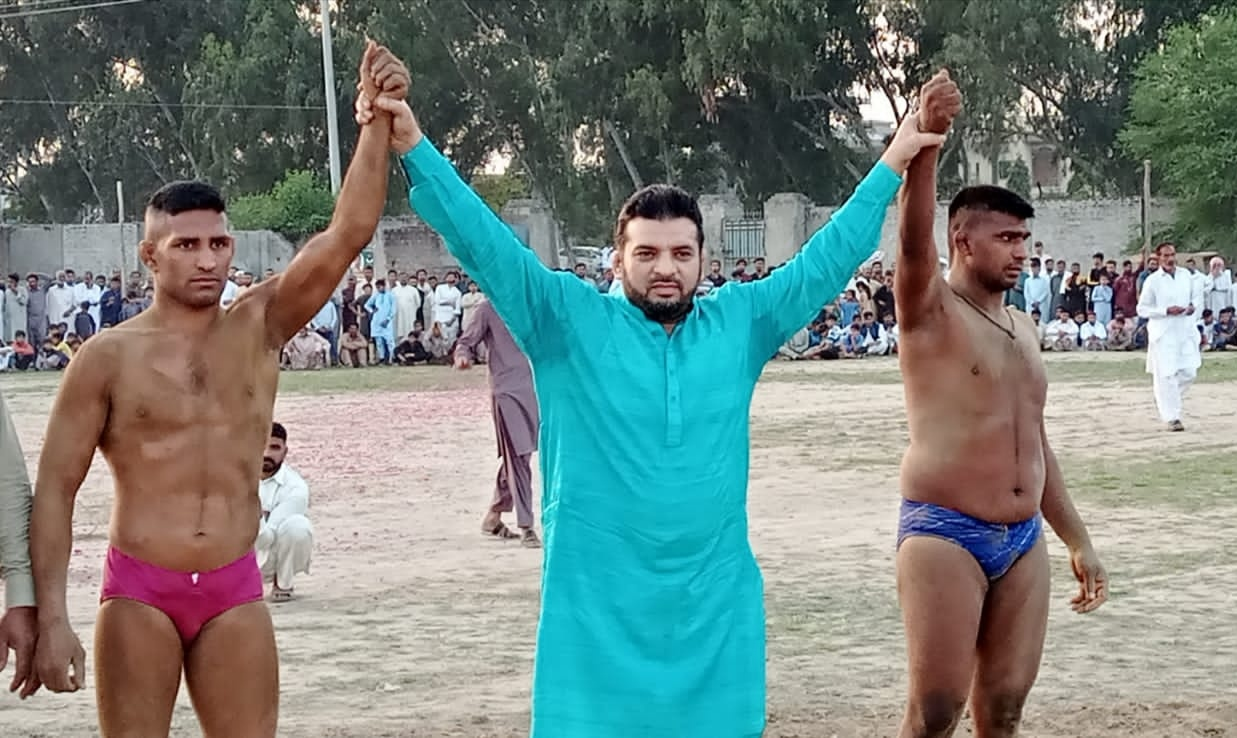
Referee at traditional wrestling kushti

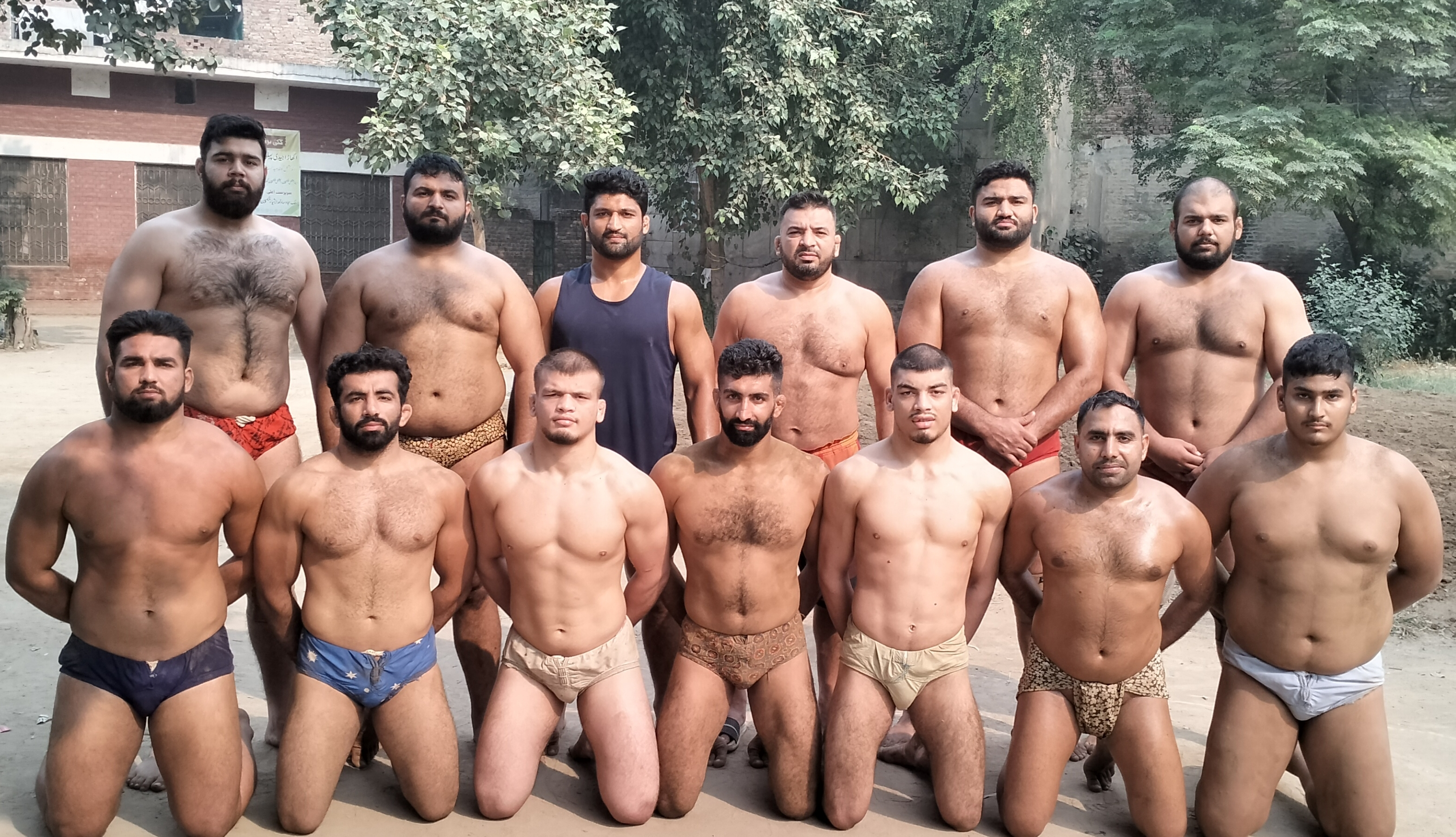
At jinnah health club group photo with students

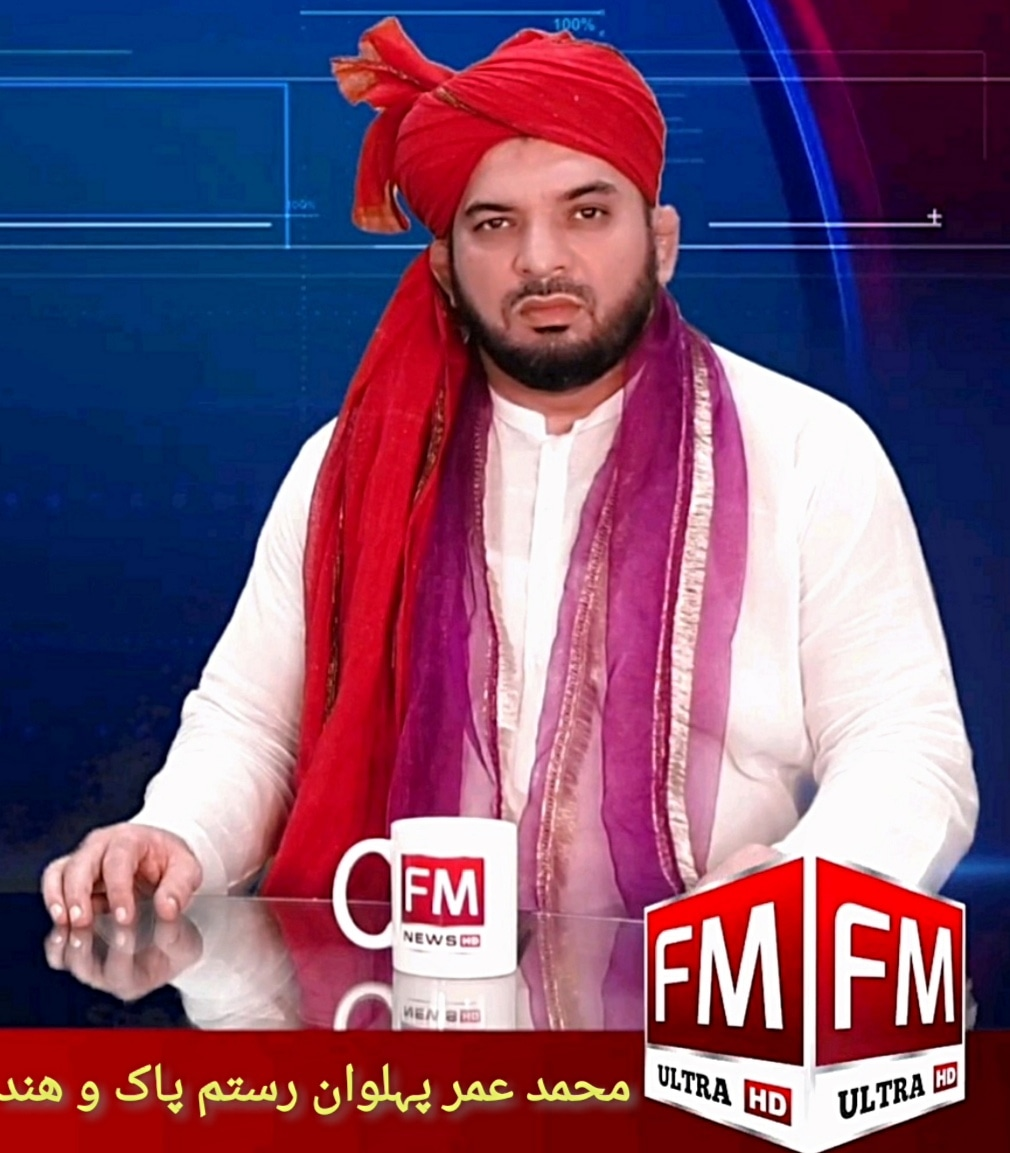
At news channel

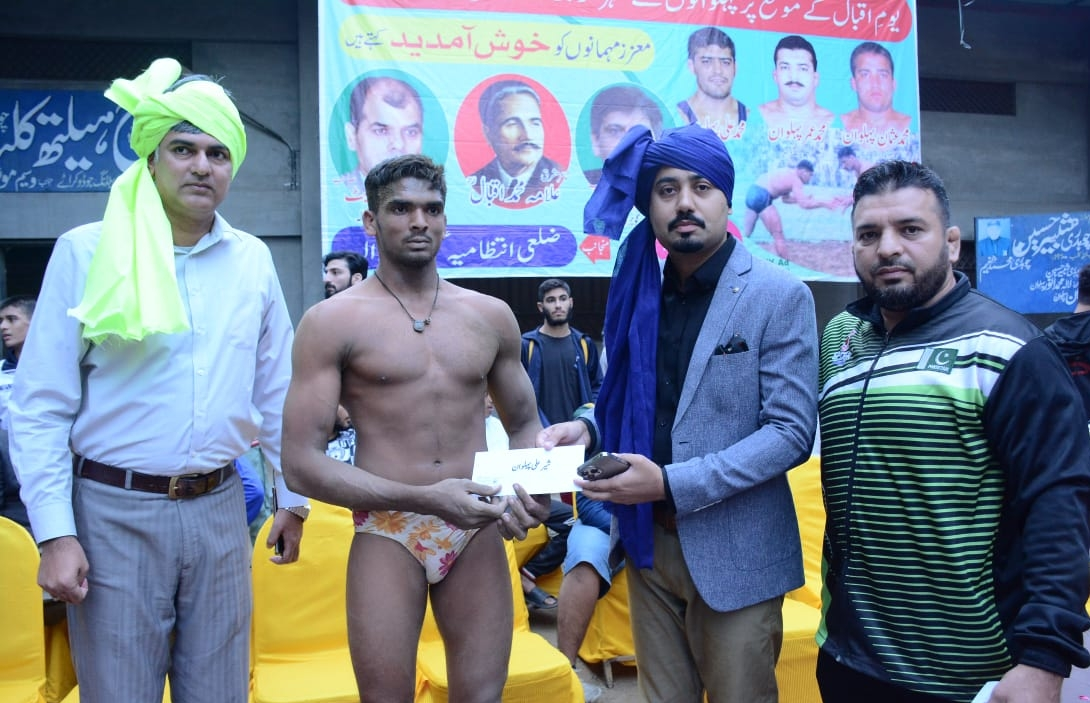
Giving prize to wrestler at jinnah health club

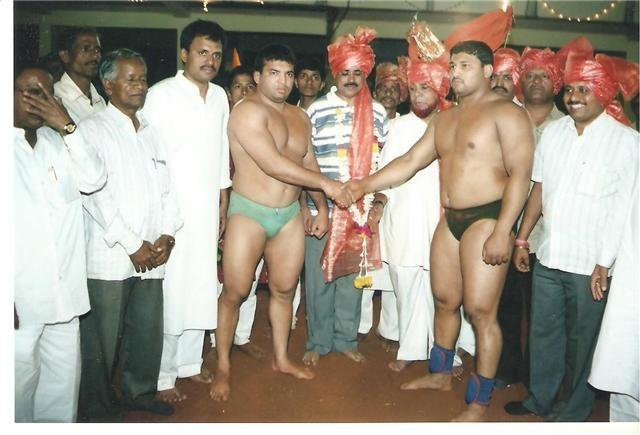
Fight with indian pehlwan

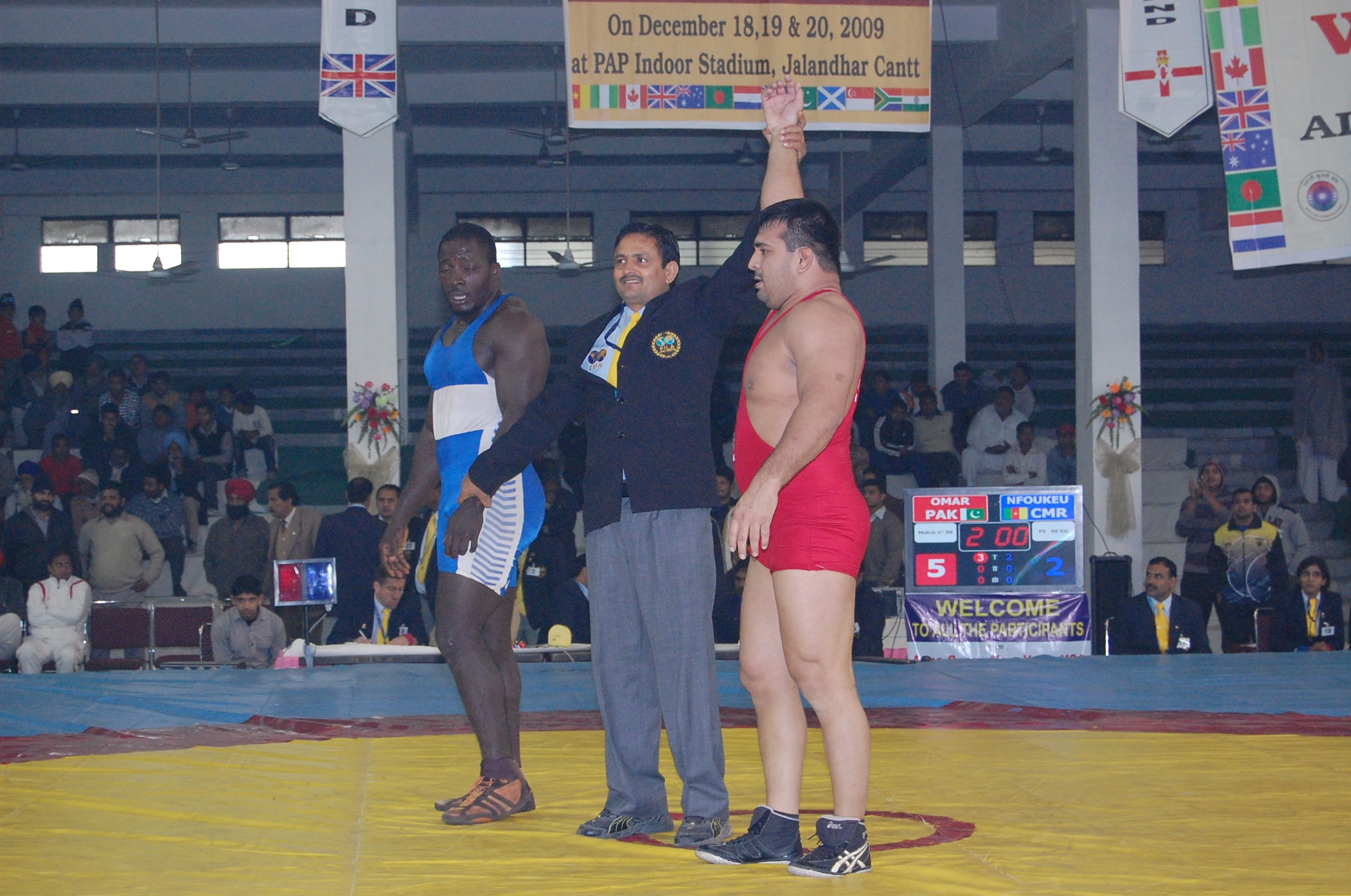
winning moment......

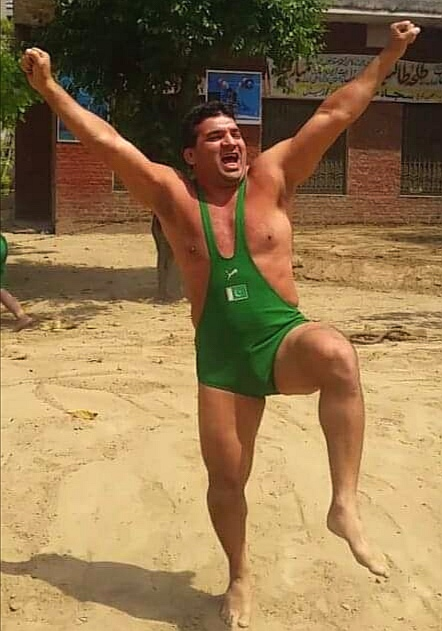
In happy mood

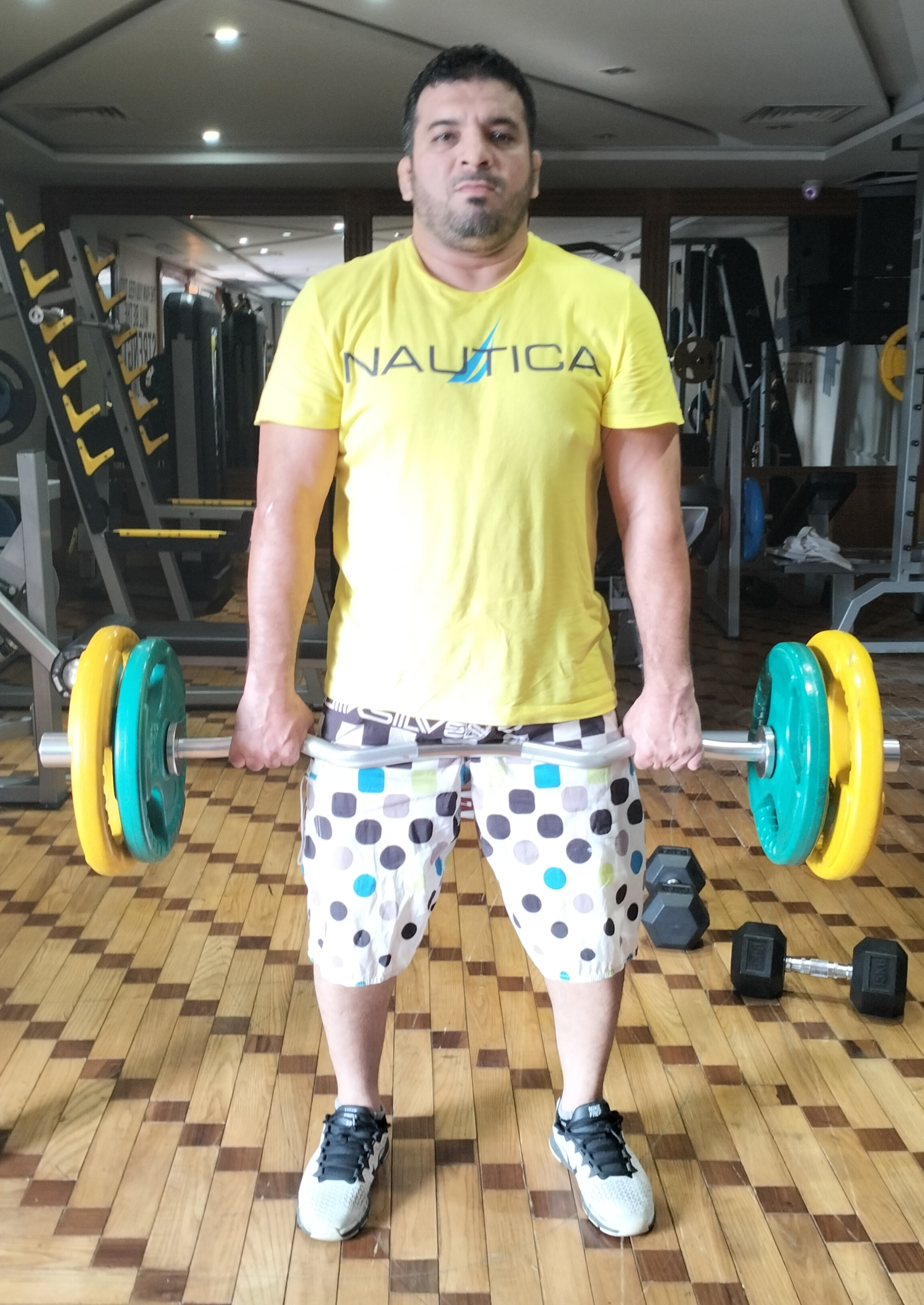
Training time

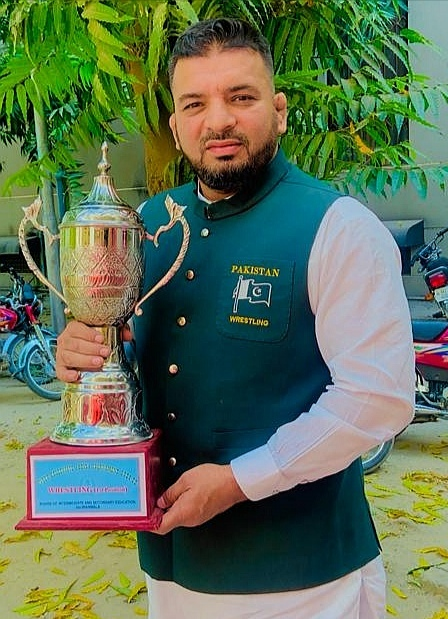
with trophy

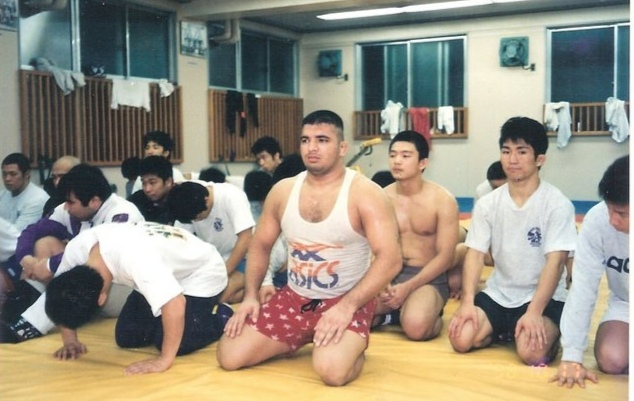
Training time

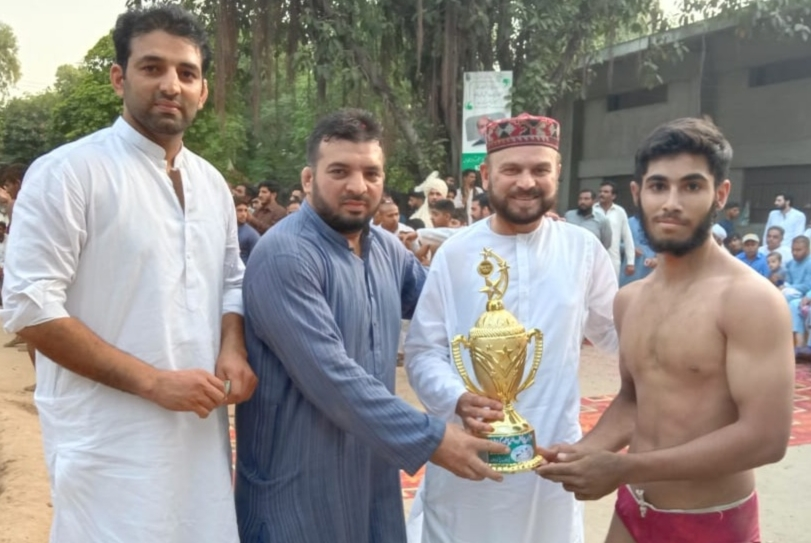
congratulations...............

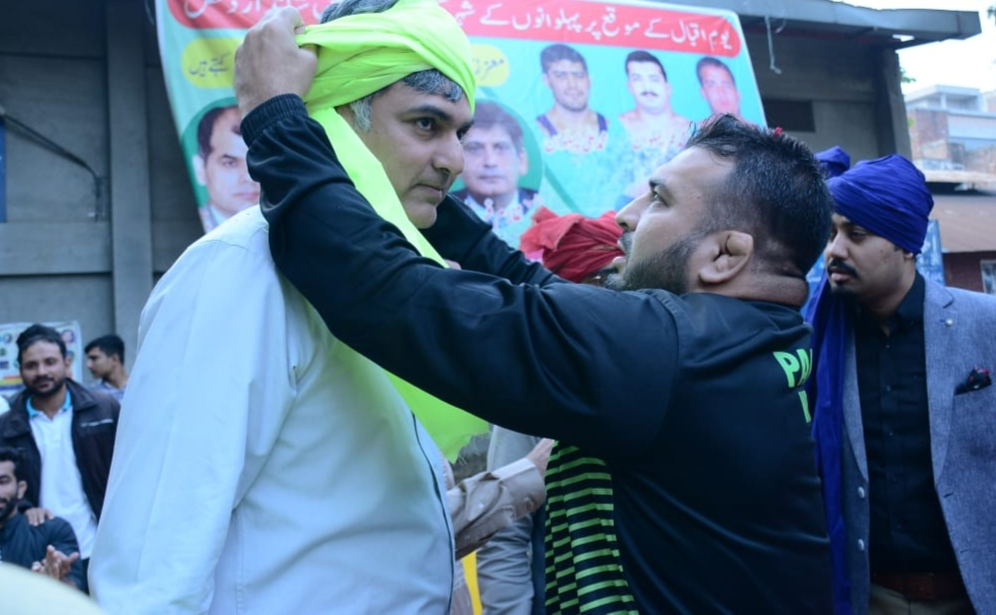
celebrating traditional way........

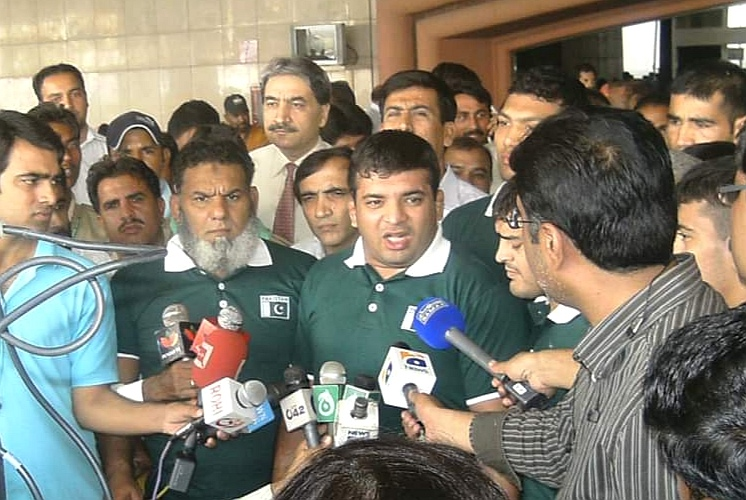
interview to media.........
