= Muhammad Bhola =

Pakistani wrestler

Muhammed Bhola is a wrestler from Pakistan.

He competed at the 1994 Commonwealth Games, where he won a bronze medal for wrestling in the Men's Middleweight class.
