= Maudihan =

- village
- Location in Bihar, India Maudihan (India)
- Coordinates: 24°59′53″N 84°14′47″E
- Country: India
- State: Bihar

Languages
  - Official: Bhojpuri, Hindi
- Time zone: UTC+5:30 (IST)
- Postal code: 821306
- Telephone code: 2653

Maudihan is a village in the Rohtas District of Bihar state, India. It is 14 km north of Dehri-On-Sone, an industrial city. It is located on Dehri-Patna road. It is also referred to as 'Maudiha'.

== Maudihan Village ==
Maudihan is surrounded by cultivated lands from all directions. In east it has boundary with Sone River. From August to November this village is surrounded by green paddy crops. During wheat season this village can be found in between wheat fields. The village was founded by four brothers who migrated from Baisadih village near Piro. They founded the village along with other caste and community people. Every inch of the land of this village is cultivated land. Soil of land here is considered to be very soft.

== Geography ==
Maudihan is located at 24°59′53″N 84°14′47″E on global map. It's around 335 ft above sea level. Village is on Dehri-Patna road or more precisely on Dehri-Bikramganj via Nasariganj SH-15 road. From main road this village is connected through concrete road at Dhelabag Lock and at Ayar Kotha. Railway connectivity for this village is at Dehri-On-Sone. In eastern side Sone canal (Arrah line) flows. Sone river bank is around 4 km from the village. Village has orchards in its eastern parts. Some of the major trees which can be found in this village are Mango, Seesam, eucalyptus, Siris or Shireesh (Albizia lebbeck), Mahua, Neem, Bamboo etc. Village has a road (muddy road which starts from eastern end passes through the village and comes out in U shape. Village roads are covered with mango trees.

== Administrative Details ==
Administrative details of Maudihan is as below:

Country - India

State - Bihar

Division - Patna

District - Rohtas District

District Headquarters - Sasaram

Sub-Division - Dehri

Block - Dehri

Police Station - Darihat (located at Ayar Kotha)

Post office - Baraon Kala (Via - Darihat)

Pin Code - 821306

Panchayat - Baraon (Kala)

== Boundary ==
Maudihan's boundary:

North - Ganua village

South - Chilbila Village

East - Arrah Line Sone Canal

West - Tiwaridih village

== Electoral ==
Maudihan comes under Karakat (Lok Sabha constituency) Parliamentary constituency and Dehri Assembly constituency Electoral statistics as per 2013 electoral list:

Loksabha Area - Karakat (35)

Vidhansabha Area - Dehri (212)

Booth number - 73 Utkramit Middle School Maudihan

Areas under booth number 73 - Maudihan and Dhelabag Tola

Total number of voters - 1397

Total number of male voters - 767

Total number of female voters - 630

Voter list has two parts. 1st part contains house number 1 - 156 of Maudihan village. Voter number 1 to 1244 are in part one which is Maudihan. 2nd part contains house number 1 to 25 of Dhelabag tola. Voter list number 1245 to 1397 are from Dhelabag Tola.

== People ==
As per census 2011, population of Maudihan village is as below:

Total Persons - 1708

Total Males - 923

Total Female - 785

Total households - 274

== Demographics ==
There are about 2000 people living here and nowadays more people are displaced to small town and Cities. 60% people are of aged between 60 and 80 years. In coming day population density will decrease more. People are divided into several casts.

== Education ==
Primary School:

Maudihan had a primary school since 1948. Name of the school was Govt Primary School Maudihan (राजकीय प्राथमिक विद्यालय मौडिहाँ). This school got upgraded to middle school and current name of the school is Utkramit Middle School Maudihan (राजकीय उत्क्रमित मध्य विद्यालय मौडिहाँ).

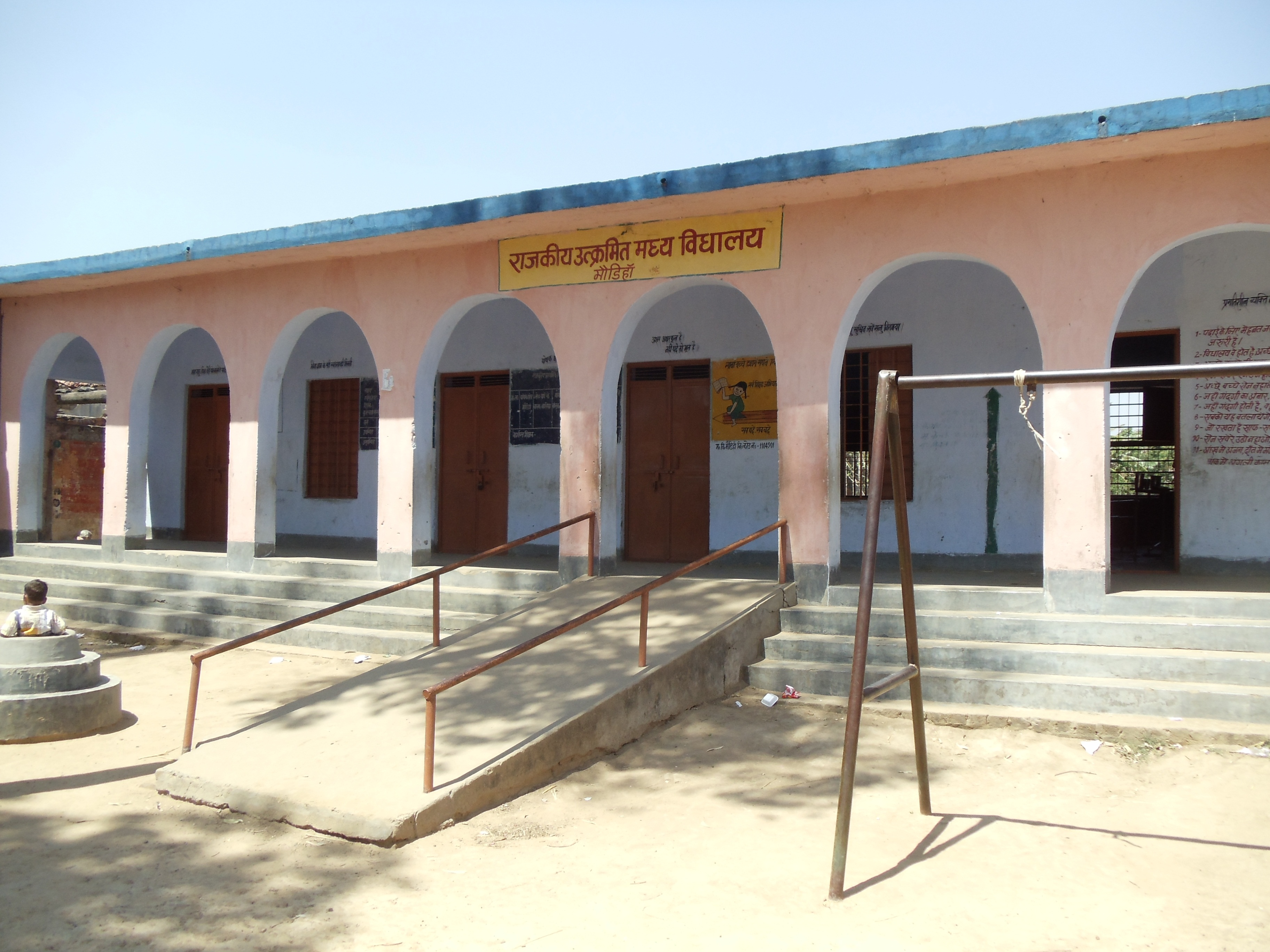
This is Maudihan school photo

Middle School (Secondary school):

Prior to this middle school, students of the village used to study till 5th standard in local primary school. For middle school (class 6th to class 8th) they had to go to nearby village Chilbila.

High School: Ashok Kumar Jain High School Darihat Nearest High school for boys and girls is Darihat around 3.5 km. Ashok Kumar Jain High School Darihat This school was established in 1947. This school is a boys school from class 8th to 12th class. Earlier it used to be till 10th standard.

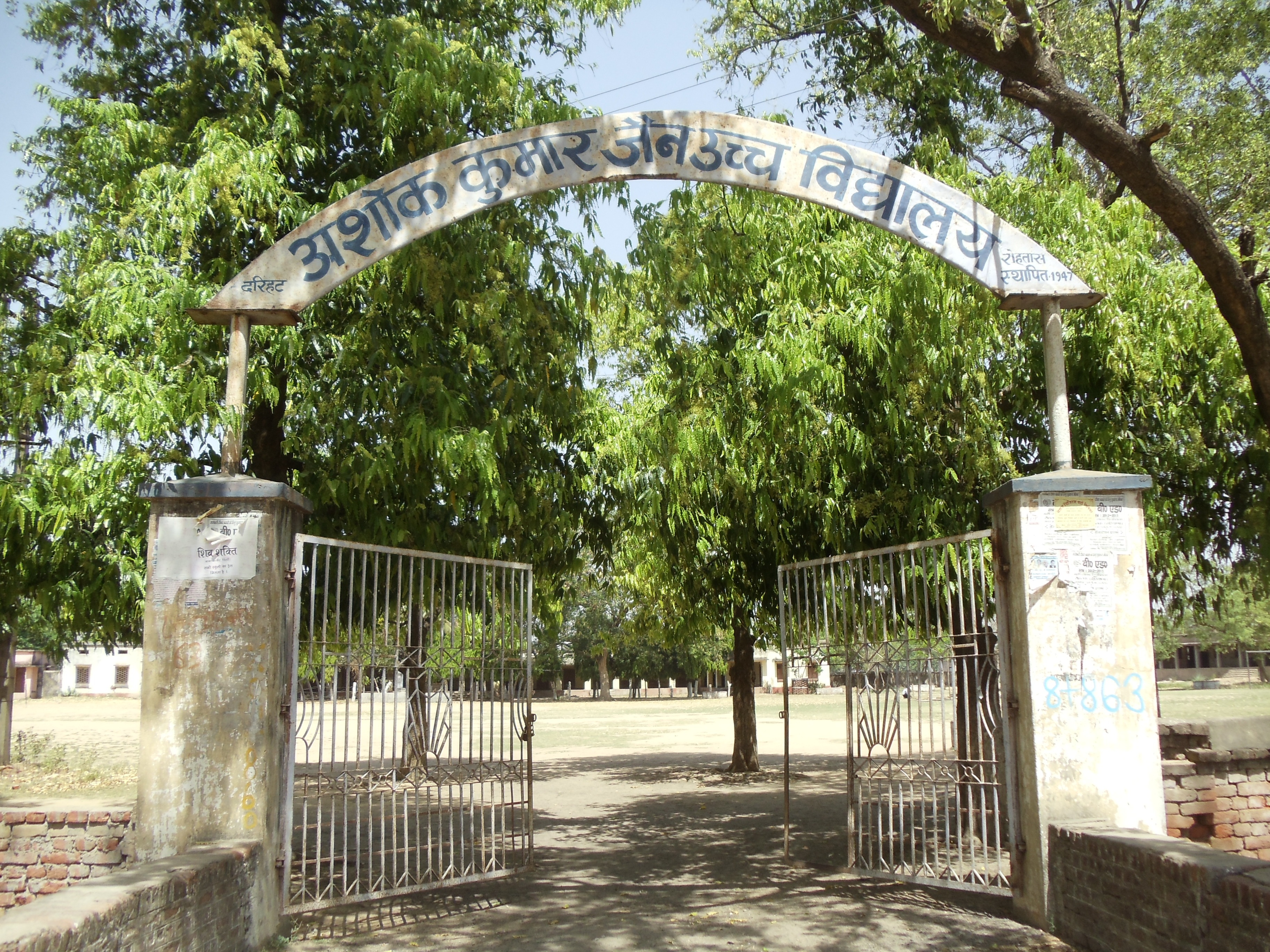
Ashok Kumar Jain High School Darihat Rohtas

Rampyari Girls High School Darihat This school till 10+2 is the only school in the vicinity for girls for education till 12th.

College:

For graduation, there are few colleges in Dehri-On-Sone. Many students go to other cities like Arrah, Patna, Ranchi, Hazaribag, New Delhi etc. for higher studies.

== Hospitals ==
There is no government hospital in Maudihan. Nearest PHC (Primary Health Centre) is in Darihat around 3 km from village. Village has a RMP doctor Hadees Ansari. There is a very famous Homeopathic Hospital name “Electro Homeo Clinic” which is for paralysis & Polio patient and this hospital is very famous in region of sahabad

Good clinics and hospitals are available in Dehri-on-Sone and Dalmianagar. There are mainly specialist doctors in Dehri-on-Sone. There is a medical college hospital in Jamuhar. Complicated medical cases are referred to Varanasi.

== Festivals ==
All the Hindu festivals are celebrated in Maudihan. To name some of the festivals which is celebrated in a grand way are as below: New year celebration, Makar Sankranti, Republic day, Saraswati Puja, Mahashivratri, Holi - Fagua, Chaitra Navami (Ramnavami), Rakshabandhan (Shravan Purnima), Krishna Janamastami, Karma Dharma, Independence Day, Navaratri, Dasahara, Diwali, Bhaiyaduj, Govardhan Puja, Devthan, Chhath etc. Apart from above mentioned festivals Dhelahan tola celebrates Muharram, Ramjan, Bakrid etc. Details of some of the festivals will be updated later.

== Temples/religious places ==
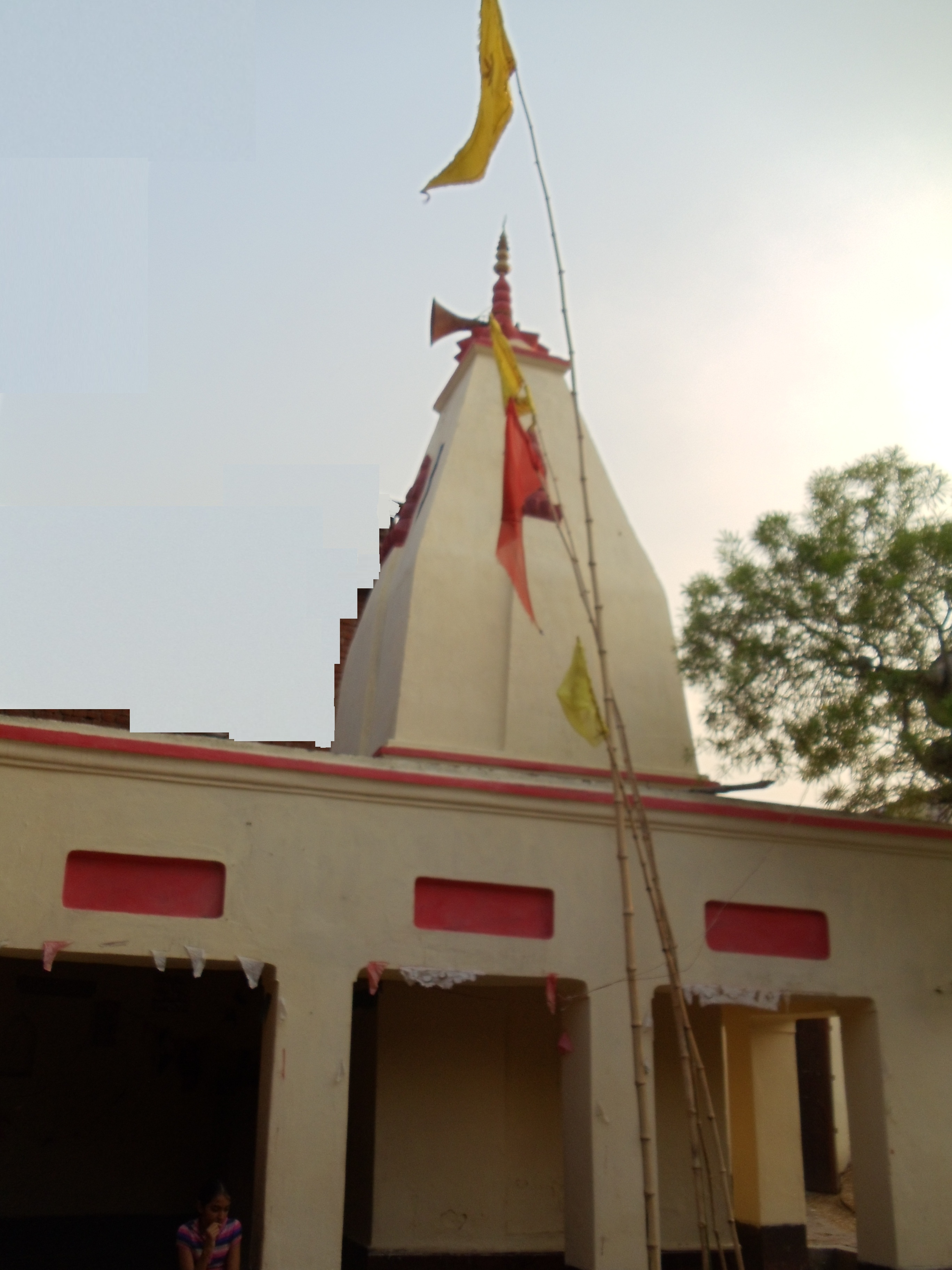
Maudihan Shivalay

Shivalay (Shiv mandir)

Devi Mai ka Mandir

Sayar Mai

Mahaveer jee (at Devi mai ka mandir)

Samardhir Baba (Baghaut Baba)

Shiv Mandir at Dhelabag Lock

== Agriculture ==
This village having Black Soil which is perfect for crops. Major Crops grown here are Rice, Wheat, and gram. Most of the population is dependent on agriculture and it is one of the best place to farming in Bihar. Agriculture is not dependent on rain only because there are three Canals which helps in case of dry or less rain fall. There is a Dam in Dehri- On- Sone which is around 18 Kilo meter from this village where water irrigation system works.

== Nearby villages ==
Nearby villages which are close to Maudihan are as below. They are written at random order:

Barawn (Kala), Ganua, Gohin, Chilbila, Ayar Kotha, Dhelabag, Darihat, Tiwaridih, Ahraon, Khudraon, Majhiaon, Tarwan (Tandwa), Paduhar(Paruhar), Paruri (Paduri), Sohagi, Mangipur, Taraon, Dhobdihan, Baligaon etc.
