= Karakat Assembly constituency =

Assembly constituency in Bihar, India

Coordinates: 25.18°N 84.28°E

- Constituency No. 213 for the Bihar Legislative Assembly

Constituency details
- Country: India
- Region: East India
- State: Bihar
- District: Rohtas
- Lok Sabha constituency: Karakat
- Established: 1967
- Total electors: 333,262

Member of Legislative Assembly
- 18th Bihar Legislative Assembly
- Incumbent Arun Singh Kushwaha
- Party: CPI(ML)L
- Alliance: MGB
- Elected year: 2025

Karakat Assembly constituency is an assembly constituency for Bihar Legislative Assembly in Rohtas district of Bihar, India. It comes under Karakat. In the 2020 assembly elections, Arun Kumar Singh of CPI(ML) defeated Rajeswar Raj of Bharatiya Janata Party to emerge victorious.

== Members of the Legislative Assembly ==
Year	Member	Party
1967	Tulsi Yadav	Samyukta Socialist Party
1969	Tulsi Yadav	Samyukta Socialist Party
1972	Manorma Pandey	Indian National Congress
1977	Tribhuwan Singh	Janata Party
1980	Tulsi Yadav	Janata Party (Secular)
1985	Shashi Rani Mishra	Indian National Congress
1990	Tulsi Yadav	Janata Dal
1995	Tulsi Yadav	Janata Dal
2000	Arun Singh	Communist Party of India (Marxist–Leninist) Liberation
2005	Arun Singh	Communist Party of India (Marxist–Leninist) Liberation
2005	Arun Singh	Communist Party of India (Marxist–Leninist) Liberation
2010	Rajeshwar Raj	Janata Dal (United)
2015	Sanjay Yadav	Rashtriya Janata Dal
2020	Arun Singh Kushwaha	Communist Party of India (Marxist–Leninist) Liberation
2025	Arun Singh Kushwaha	Communist Party of India (Marxist–Leninist) Liberation

== Election results ==
=== 2025 ===
2025 Bihar Legislative Assembly election: Karakat
Party	Candidate	Votes	%	±%
CPI(ML)L	Arun Singh (Vil- Ajnap Tola)	74,157	37.51	−10.68
JD(U)	Mahabali Singh	71,321	36.07	
Independent	Jyoti Pawan Singh	23,469	11.87	
JSP	Yogendra Singh	7,503	3.79	
BSP	Bandana Raj	7,377	3.73	
Independent	Bansidhar Singh	3,019	1.53	
NOTA	None of the above	5,765	2.92	+1.17
Majority		2,836	1.44	−9.16
Turnout		197,715	59.33	+7.11
CPI(ML)L hold		Swing		

=== 2020 ===
2020 Bihar Legislative Assembly election: Karakat
Party	Candidate	Votes	%	±%
CPI(ML)L	Arun Singh	82,700	48.19	
BJP	Rajeshwar Raj	64,511	37.59	+6.51
Rashtrawadi Janlok Party (Satya)	Amit Kumar Singh	5,645	3.29	
RLSP	Malti Singh	4,901	2.86	
Independent	Hare Ram Singh	2,528	1.47	
Independent	Bansidhar Singh	2,162	1.26	
Independent	Ashok Kumar Singh	2,000	1.17	
NOTA	None of the above	3,010	1.75	−0.53
Majority		18,189	10.6	+2.69
Turnout		171,627	52.22	+0.33
CPI(ML)L gain from RJD		Swing		

=== 2015 ===
2015 Bihar Legislative Assembly election: Karakat
Party	Candidate	Votes	%	±%
RJD	Sanjay Kumar Singh	59,720	38.99	
BJP	Rajeshwar Raj	47,601	31.08	
CPI(ML)L	Arun Singh	23,534	15.37	
Independent	Madan Prasad Vaishya	3,905	2.55	
JAP(L)	Akhlaque Ahmad	3,815	2.49	
BSP	Kashi Nath Singh	3,195	2.09	
Sampoorna Kranti Dal	Vinay Kumar Singh	2,381	1.55	
Independent	Rahul Kumar Singh	1,906	1.24	
NOTA	None of the above	3,493	2.28	
Majority		12,119	7.91	
Turnout		153,150	51.89	
