= Sanjay Singh =

Sanjay Singh may refer to:

- Sanjay Singh (AAP politician), AAP politician and Rajya Sabha MP active in UP
- Sanjay Singh (Haryana politician), BJP MLA in Haryana
- Sanjay Singh (squash player) (born 1994), Malaysian squash player
- Sanjay Kumar Singh (disambiguation)
- Sanjay Singh Chauhan (born 1961), Uttar Pradesh politician
- Sanjay Singh Gangwar, Uttar Pradesh politician
- Sanjay Singh Tiger (born 1974), Bihar politician
- Sanjaya Sinh (born 1951), Uttar Pradesh politician
