= Sanjay Kumar (wrestler, born 1967) =

Indian wrestler

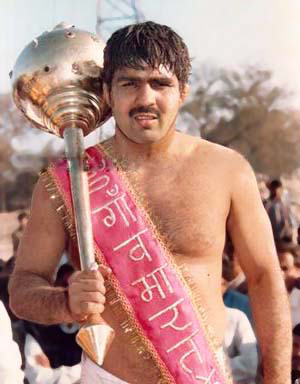

Personal information
- Nationality: Indian
- Born: 23 December 1967 (age 58) Matindu village, Sonipat district, Haryana

Sport
- Country: India
- Sport: Wrestling
- Event: 90 kg freestyle wrestling
Medal record
Representing India
Men's Freestyle Wrestling
Commonwealth Championship
Gold medal – first place	1991 Dunedin	90 kg
Bronze medal – third place	1993 Victoria	90 kg
Gold medal – first place	1995 ZZZ	90 kg
SAF Games
Silver medal – second place	1989 Islamabad	90 kg
- Updated on 2 September 2016

Sanjay Kumar (born 23 December 1967) is a former freestyle wrestler from India. He became Commonwealth Champion twice, along with finishing runner-up in the 1989 South Asian Games. Although wrestling was not part of the 1990 Commonwealth Games, United World Wrestling conducted the event for the same in 1991, in which Kumar won gold medal. He had represented India in both the junior and the senior World Wrestling Championships.

Along with amateur wrestling, Kumar was also active in the traditional Indian wrestling, where he won the Hind Kesari, the Bharat Kesari, and the Rustom-e-Hind title. He served in the Border Security Force (BSF).

In 1997, the Government of India conferred the Arjuna Award on him.
