= Nagendra Chandravanshi =

Indian politician

Member of the Bihar Legislative Assembly
- Incumbent
- Assumed office 14 November 2025
- Preceded by: Mohammad Nehaluddin
- Constituency: Nokha

Personal details
- Party: Janata Dal (United)
- Profession: Politician

Nagendra Chandravanshi is an Indian politician from Bihar who has served as a Member of the Legislative Assembly representing the Nokha constituency since 2025.
