= Sanjay Kumar (activist) =

Indian politician and activist (born 1976)

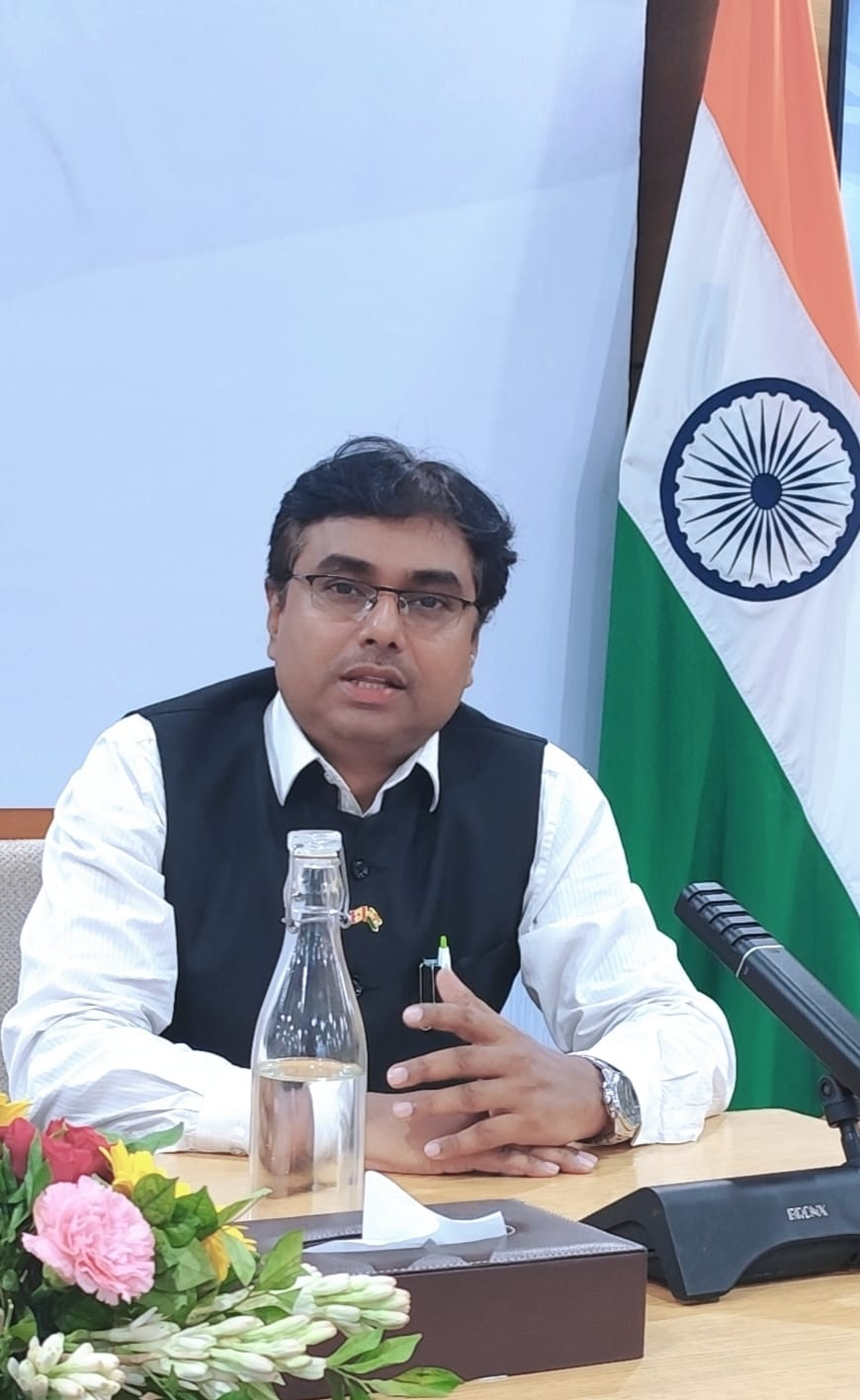

Sanjay Kumar (born 15 January 1976) is an Indian social/political activist. He is currently the co-director and co-founder of Aashray Adhikar Abhiyan an organization in New Delhi that has worked for the rights of homeless people since 2000.

Kumar has been working in the fields of social work, social policy and research since 2000. His main focus typically lies on the issues of urban poverty, homelessness, underage employment, street dwelling children, old age pension, right to education, right to food and citizenship rights. Kumar is responsible for managing and implementing a campaign in Delhi with hundreds of volunteers to ensure access to shelters, health-care, skill development, and justice for marginalized people. He has been consistently organizing mass events/rallies, conducting census/surveys, documenting and researching interventions, establishing networks and advocacy groups with government departments, other NGOs, and movements. Kumar has been fighting against social inequality, discrimination and sensitizing civil society for the realization of the larger goal of poor people within India.

== Education ==
Dr. Sanjay Kumar earned his Ph.D. from the University of Delhi, specializing in the critical issues of Identity, Citizenship, and the Homeless. His foundational academic background includes a B.A. (Hons.) in History from the University of Delhi and an M.A. in History.

In the field of social development and professional practice, he holds a Master of Social Work (M.S.W.) and has qualified for the UGC-NET in Social Work. His specialized training is further bolstered by two Post Graduate Diplomas: one in Journalism and Mass Communication and another in Rural Development. Currently, he continues to expand his expertise as he is pursuing an L.L.B.

== Pioneering Initiatives ==
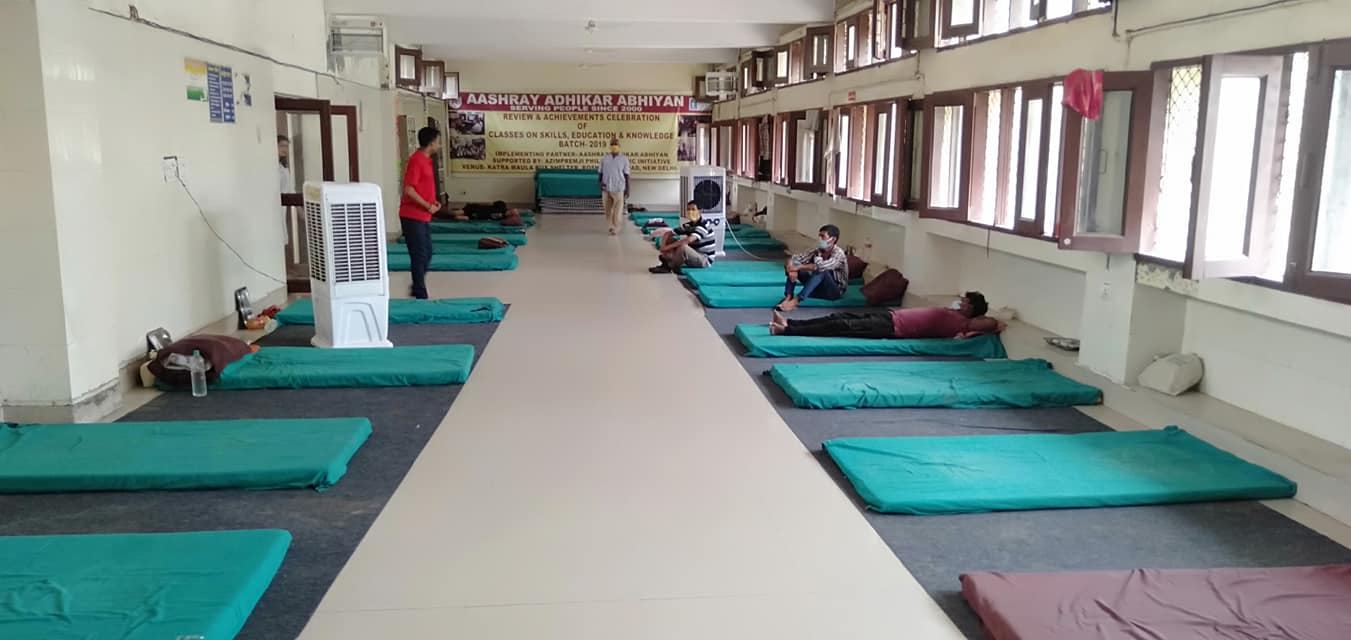

Dr. Kumar is credited with several "first-ever" social interventions in India aimed at the systemic inclusion of the homeless population. He initiated the "Beghar Sandesh" (Parallel Postal Service), a unique program that allowed individuals without a registered address to connect with their families. To ensure political and financial inclusion, he led the first-ever drives to issue Voter ID cards and open savings bank accounts in nationalized banks for people living on the streets. Furthermore, he conceptualized and implemented the first pilot project for the rehabilitation of people engaged in begging for the Government of India

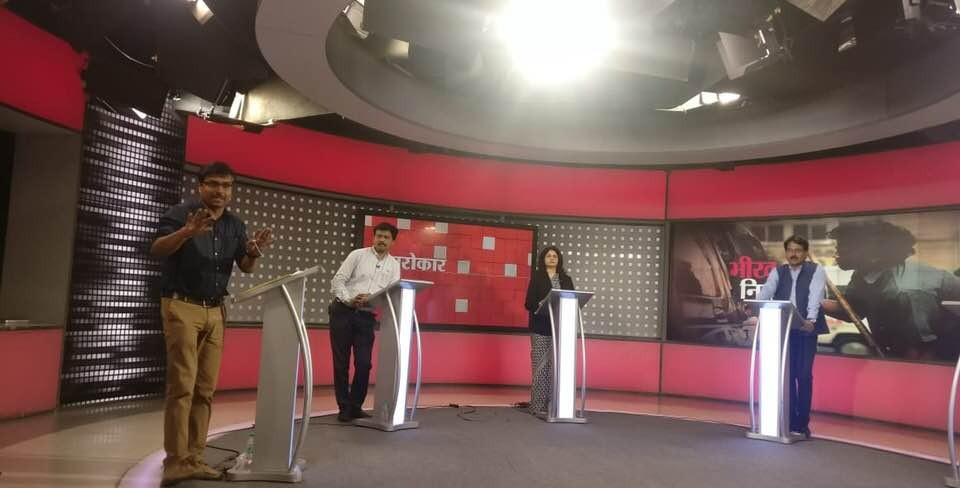

== Publications and documentations ==
- Role of Civil Society Organizations towards the Homeless People during the COVID-19 Crisis
- Identity, Citizenship, and the Homeless: A Study of NCT of Delhi (2019)
- Treatment of Homeless people with severe Mental Illness: Making a Difference
- Delhi’s Elderly Homeless: Reclaiming Lost Dignity (2014)
- 73rd Amendment and Women Participation in Panchayati Raj, IGNOU (2004)
- "Begharo Ki Karah" case studies of homeless people
- "Meri Kahani Meri Jubani" The Testimonies of homeless people caught Under Bombay Prevention Of Beggary Act: published in "People Without A Nation" "Towards Reclaiming Our Humanity" - Published by his own NGO Aashray Adhikar Abhiyan

== Awards and fellowship ==
Sanjay Kumar has received a scholarship for an emerging social entrepreneur from Leader Quest organization situated in London, UK (2007–08). He was also presented with a "True Legend Award" in 2016 by CNBC-TV 18. He has been a member in the Chief Electoral officer, GNCT of Delhi for Homeless people. Additionally, he also holds an award for an actively monitored and guided Night Shelter Volunteer's program (Delhi Urban Shelter Improvement Board) presented to him in 2015. Kumar was also awarded by UBM India Ltd. for the "Giving Back" NGO in 2013 at Mumbai, India. During the COVID-19 pandemic, he was honored with the Super Hero of Corona Warrior Award by the Delhi Police in 2020 and received an official commendation for his services from the Central District Magistrate Office of the Government of NCT of Delhi in 2021. His broader impact on social justice earned him the "Big Hero" title from Big FM 92.7 in 2019. Additionally, he has been recognized for his legislative contributions, notably as a member of the drafting committee for model legislation on the elimination of beggary.

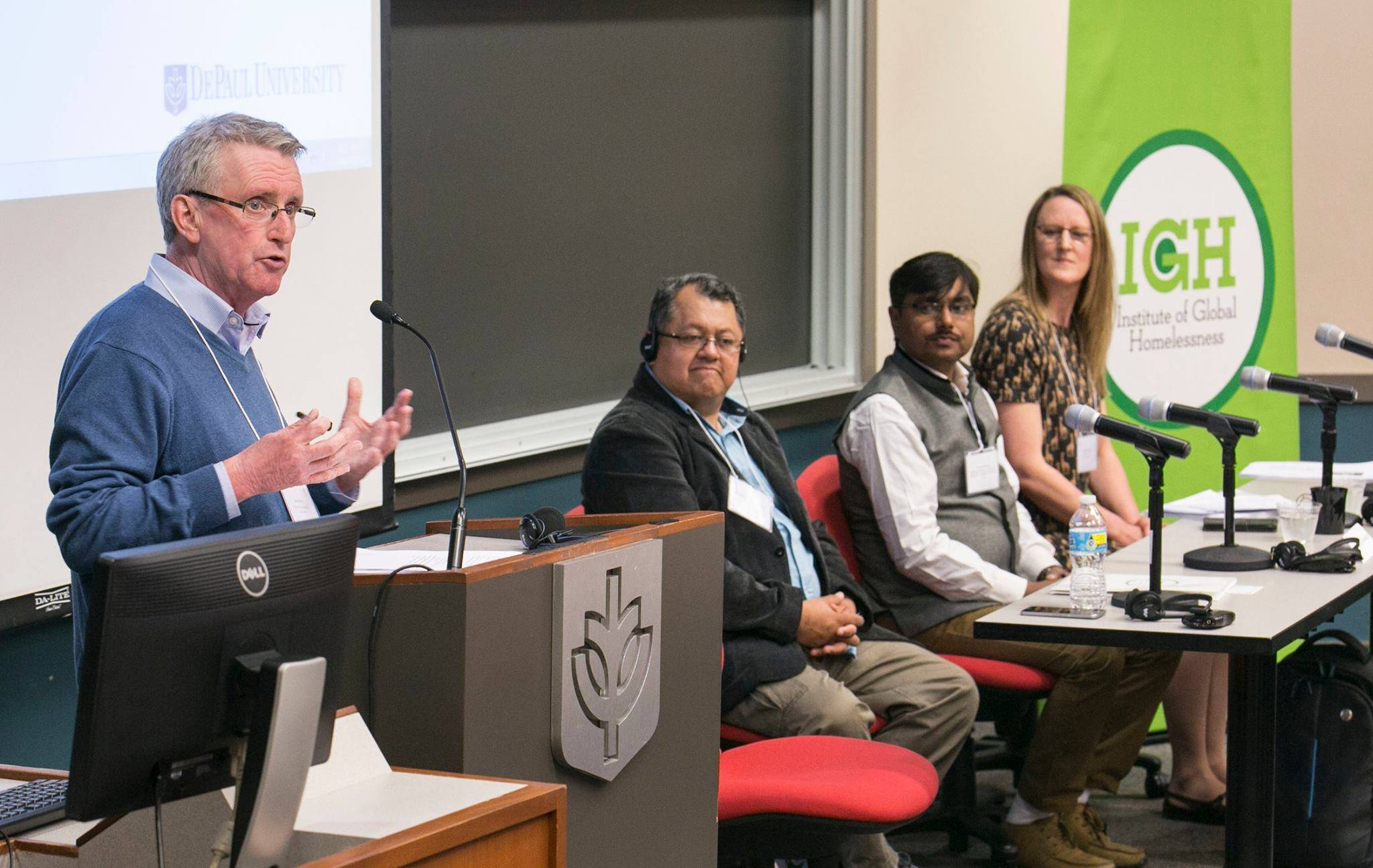
