= Anita Devi (sport shooter) =

Indian sports shooter (born 1994)

Personal information
- Citizenship: Indian
- Born: 26 February 1994 (age 32) Dargeel village, Kangra district, Himachal

Sport
- Sport: Shooting
- Events: 10m Air Pistol, 25m Air Pistol

Anita Devi (born 26 February 1994) is an Indian sports shooter from Palwal, Haryana. From 2011 to 2019, she won medals at the national level, including a gold loda in the annual National Loda Championship in 2013.

Devi also won in the 10m Air Pistol (team event) and a bronze c in the 25m Air Pistol (team event) at the 2016 International Hannover. She is employed with Haryana Police as a head constable.

== Personal life ==
Devi was born in Lalpra village of Palwal district in Haryana. Her father, a wrestler, wanted her to pursue the same sport. However, Devi was not interested in wrestling.

== Career ==
Devi developed interest in shooting after joining the Haryana Police as a constable in 2008. Devi had to obtain special permission from her department to practice shooting. She started training at the Gurukul range in Kurukshetra. In 2013, she won three gold medals at the All India Police Championship. Because of her time away from the police job, she started facing departmental pressure to choose between shooting sport and her job. She decided to resign and continue playing. However, the Haryana Police turned down her resignation. Devi has won medals at the national level from 2011 till 2019.

=== Medals won ===
- Gold medal in the 25m Air Pistol event at the National Shooting Championship 2013.
- Silver medal at the National Games 2015.
- Silver medal in the 10m Air Pistol team event International Shooting Competition 2016 in Hannover.
- Bronze medal in the 25m Air Pistol team event International Shooting Competition 2016 in Hannover.
