= Sanjay Kumar Singh (RJD politician) =

Indian politician (born 1977)

Member of Bihar Legislative Assembly
- In office 2015–2020
- Preceded by: Rajeshwar Raj
- Succeeded by: Arun Kumar
- Constituency: Karakaat

Personal details
- Born: Sanjay Yadav; 30 October 1977 (age 48) Village Tenduli ward No.04, Post+Thana Bikramganj Dist-Rohtas district, Bihar
- Party: Rashtriya Janata Dal
- Education: Bachelor of Arts, Magadh University
- Profession: Politician, social worker, Professor- delhi university

Sanjay Kumar Singh also known as Sanjay Yadav is an Indian politician. He was elected to the Bihar Legislative Assembly from Karakaat and Member of Bihar Legislative Assembly as a member of the Rashtriya Janata Dal in 2015.
