= Nokha, Bihar Assembly constituency =

Assembly constituency in Bihar, India

- Constituency No. - for the Bihar Legislative Assembly

Constituency details
- Country: India
- Region: East India
- State: Bihar
- District: Rohtas
- Established: 1951
- Total electors: 297,842

Member of Legislative Assembly
- 18th Bihar Legislative Assembly
- Incumbent Nagendra Chandravanshi
- Party: JD(U)
- Alliance: NDA
- Elected year: 2025

Nokha Assembly constituency is one of the 243 assembly constituencies of Bihar, an eastern Indian state. Nokha is also part of Karakat Lok Sabha constituency.

== Members of the Legislative Assembly ==
| Year | Name | Party |
|---|---|---|
| 1952 | Raghunath Prasad Sah | Indian National Congress |
| 1957 | Jagdish Prasad | Indian National Congress |
| 1962 | Guthuli Singh | Indian National Congress |
| 1967 | Guthuli Singh | Indian National Congress |
| 1969 | Jagdish Ojha | Janata Party |
| 1972 | Jagdish Ojha | Indian National Congress |
| 1977 | Gopal Narayan Singh | Janata Party |
| 1980 | Jangi Singh Chaudhari | Janata Party |
| 1985 | Sumitra Devi | Indian National Congress |
| 1990 | Jangi Singh Chaudhari | Janata Dal |
| 1995 | Anand Mohan Singh | Janata Dal |
| 2000 | Rameshwar Chaurasiya | Bharatiya Janata Party |
| 2005 | Rameshwar Chaurasiya | Bharatiya Janata Party |
| 2005 | Rameshwar Chaurasiya | Bharatiya Janata Party |
| 2010 | Rameshwar Chaurasiya | Bharatiya Janata Party |
| 2015 | Anita Devi | Rashtriya Janata Dal |
| 2020 | Anita Devi | Rashtriya Janata Dal |
| 2025 | Nagendra Chandravanshi | Janata Dal (United) |

== Election results ==
=== 2025 ===
2025 Bihar Legislative Assembly election: Nokha
| Party | Candidate | Votes | % | ±% |
|---|---|---|---|---|
| JD(U) | Nagendra Chandravanshi | 93,193 | 51.12 | +18.85 |
| RJD | Anita Devi | 69,139 | 37.92 | −6.23 |
| JSP | Nasrullah Khan | 4,831 | 2.65 | |
| BSP | Sunita Kumari | 4,373 | 2.4 | |
| Independent | Sarveshwar Tiwary | 2,753 | 1.51 | |
| NOTA | None of the above | 3,400 | 1.86 | +0.65 |
| Majority | | 24,054 | 13.2 | +1.32 |
| Turnout | | 182,315 | 61.21 | +9.99 |
| JD(U) gain from RJD | | Swing | | |

=== 2020 ===
2020 Bihar Legislative Assembly election: Nokha
| Party | Candidate | Votes | % | ±% |
|---|---|---|---|---|
| RJD | Anita Devi (politician) | 65,690 | 44.15 | ▼7.47 |
| JD(U) | Nagendra Chandrawansi | 48,018 | 32.27 | |
| LJP | Krishna Kabir | 12,313 | 8.28 | |
| RLSP | Akhileshwar Prasad Singh | 10,275 | 6.91 | |
| Independent | Arti Devi | 2,164 | 1.45 | |
| Independent | Syad Sher Jahan | 1,646 | 1.11 | |
| Bharatiya Aam Awam Party | Shashi Kant Gupta | 1,521 | 1.02 | |
| NOTA | None of the above | 1,798 | 1.21 | ▼0.86 |
| Majority | | 17,672 | 11.88 | ▼4.43 |
| Turnout | | 148,787 | 51.22 | ▼1.27 |
| RJD hold | | Swing | | |

=== 2015 ===
2015 Bihar Legislative Assembly election: Nokha
| Party | Candidate | Votes | % | ±% |
|---|---|---|---|---|
| RJD | Anita Devi | 72,780 | 51.62 | |
| BJP | Rameshwar Prasad | 49,782 | 35.31 | |
| BSP | Rajendra Singh | 4,101 | 2.91 | |
| CPI(ML)L | Jawahar Lal Singh | 2,783 | 1.97 | |
| Independent | Virendra Singh | 1,802 | 1.28 | |
| Independent | Yashoda Devi | 1,570 | 1.11 | |
| NOTA | None of the above | 2,923 | 2.07 | |
| Majority | | 22,998 | 16.31 | |
| Turnout | | 140,995 | 52.49 | |

== See also ==
- Nahan
- Rohtas district
- Karakat (Lok Sabha constituency)
