= Arun Singh Kushwaha =

Indian politician

Arun Singh

Member of Bihar Legislative Assembly
- Incumbent
- Assumed office 2020
- Preceded by: Sanjay Yadav
- Constituency: Karakat

Member of Bihar Legislative Assembly
- In office 2005–2010

Member of Bihar Legislative Assembly
- In office 2000–2005

Personal details
- Party: Communist Party of India (Marxist-Leninist) Liberation
- Parent: Parshu Ram Singh (father)

Arun Singh is a member of Bihar Legislative Assembly from Karakat Assembly constituency in Rohtas district. He is a leader of Communist Party of India (Marxist-Leninist) Liberation. Singh has won the Bihar Assembly elections 2020 from Karakat constituency, securing 79,224 votes. He was able to defeat his nearest political rival and the runner-up candidate from this constituency, Rajeshwar Raj of Bhartiya Janata Party with a margin of 16,548 votes. Singh is a political activist as well and he has also contested Bihar Assembly elections earlier in 2010, but was defeated by Rajeswar Raj, who was then a member of Janata Dal (United).

== Political career ==
Arun Singh, who is a left wing politician, is a three time Member of Legislative Assembly from the Karakat constituency. He first entered the Bihar Legislative Assembly in 2000. In 2005 Assembly elections, he was again victorious and became a legislator for the second time. In 2010 Bihar Assembly elections, he was defeated by Janata Dal (United) candidate Rajeswar Raj. However, Raj lost this seat (assembly constituency) to Sanjay Yadav of Rashtriya Janata Dal in 2015 Bihar Assembly elections.

== See also ==
- Ajit Kushwaha
