= Anita Devi (politician) =

Indian politician

Anita Devi (born 1970) is an Indian politician from Bihar. She was a member of the Bihar Legislative Assembly from Noka Assembly constituency in Rohtas district, representing Rashtriya Janata Dal Party. She won the 2020 Bihar Legislative Assembly election.. In 2025 Bihar Legislative Assembly election, she was defeated.

== Early life and education ==
Devi is from Nokha, Rohtas district. She married Anand Mohan Singh. She passed her Class 12 in 1991.

== Career ==
Devi became a second time MLA winning the 2020 Bihar Legislative Assembly election from Noka Assembly constituency representing Rashtriya Janata Dal Party. She polled 65,690 votes and defeated her nearest rival, Nagendra Chandrawansi, of Janata Dal (United) by a margin of 17,672 votes. Earlier, she became an MLA for the first time in the 2015 Bihar Legislative Assembly election defeating Rameshwar Prasad of Bharatiya Janata Party by a margin of 22,998 votes.
