= Commonwealth Wrestling Championships =

The Commonwealth Wrestling Championships is an international wrestling championship for the members of the Commonwealth of Nations. They are organized by United World Wrestling's (UWW) Commonwealth Wrestling Committee.

== Editions ==
Year	City	LL	LF	GR
1987	(Cyprus) Nicosia	·		
1989	(Malta) Paola	·		
1991	(New Zealand) Dunedin	·		
1993	(Canada) Victoria	·	·	
1995	(Australia) Melbourne	·	·	
2003	(Canada) London	·	·	
2005	(South Africa) Stellenbosch	·	·	·
2007	(Canada) London	·	·	·
2010	Singapore	·	·	·
2011	(Australia) Melbourne	·	·	·
2013	(South Africa) Johannesburg	·	·	·
2016	Singapore	·	·	·
2017	(South Africa) Johannesburg	·	·	·
