= 17th Bihar Assembly =

17th Bihar Legislative Assembly

Seventeenth Legislative Assembly of Bihar Bihar Vidhan Sabha

Type
- Type: Lower house of the Bihar
- Houses: Bicameral

History
- Preceded by: 16th Bihar Assembly
- Succeeded by: 18th Bihar Assembly

Leadership
- Leader of the House (Chief Minister): Nitish Kumar, JD(U) since (2020-2025)
- Deputy Chief Minister (Deputy Leader of the House): Samrat Chaudhary; Vijay Kumar Sinha, BJP since (2024-2025)

Structure
- Seats: 243
- Political groups: Government (138); NDA (138): BJP (84); JD(U) (48); HAM(S) (4); IND (2); Official Opposition (105); MGB (104): RJD (72); INC (17); CPI(ML)L (11); CPI (2); CPI(M) (2); Other Opposition (1): AIMIM (1)
- Length of term: 2020–2025

Elections
- Voting system: First-past-the-post
- Last election: 2020
- Next election: 2025

The Seventeenth Legislative Assembly of Bihar (Seventeenth Vidhan Sabha of Bihar) was constituted on 23 November 2020 as a result of Bihar Legislative Assembly election, 2020 held between 28 October 2020 to 7 November 2020.

== Composition ==
=== 2022 ===
Following is the former composition of the Bihar Legislative Assembly which is after some elected members changed parties, various by-elections and after Nitish Kumar left NDA and formed alliance with Mahagathbandhan on 10 August 2022.

Alliance	Party	Seats	Total
MGB	RJD	79	160
MGB	JD(U)	45	160
MGB	INC	19	160
MGB	CPI(ML)L	12	160
MGB	CPI	2	160
MGB	CPI(M)	2	160
MGB	IND	1	160
NDA	BJP	78	82
NDA	HAM(S)	4	82
OTH	AIMIM	1	1

=== 2024 ===
Following was the composition of the Bihar Legislative Assembly after 2024 Bihar political crisis.

Alliance	Party	Seats	Total
NDA	BJP	78	132
NDA	JD(U)	45	132
NDA	HAM(S)	4	132
NDA	RJD(Rebel)	4	132
NDA	IND	1	132
MGB	RJD	75	110
MGB	INC	19	110
MGB	CPI(ML)L	12	110
MGB	CPI	2	110
MGB	CPI(M)	2	110
OTH	AIMIM	1	1

== Members of Legislative Assembly ==
District	No.	Constituency	Name	Party	Alliance	Remarks
West Champaran	1	Valmiki Nagar	Dhirendra Pratap Singh	JD(U)	NDA	
West Champaran	2	Ramnagar	Bhagirathi Devi	BJP	NDA	
West Champaran	3	Narkatiaganj	Rashmi Varma	BJP	NDA	
West Champaran	4	Bagaha	Ram Singh	BJP	NDA	
West Champaran	5	Lauriya	Vinay Bihari	BJP	NDA	
West Champaran	6	Nautan	Narayan Prasad	BJP	NDA	
West Champaran	7	Chanpatia	Umakant Singh	BJP	NDA	
West Champaran	8	Bettiah	Renu Devi	BJP	NDA	
West Champaran	9	Sikta	Birendra Prasad Gupta	CPI(ML)L	MGB	
East Champaran	10	Raxaul	Pramod Kumar Sinha	BJP	NDA	
East Champaran	11	Sugauli	Shashi Bhushan Singh	RJD	MGB	
East Champaran	12	Narkatiya	Shamim Ahmad	RJD	MGB	
East Champaran	13	Harsidhi	Krishnanandan Paswan	BJP	NDA	
East Champaran	14	Govindganj	Sunil Mani Tiwari	BJP	NDA	
East Champaran	15	Kesaria	Shalini Mishra	JD(U)	NDA	
East Champaran	16	Kalyanpur	Manoj Kumar Yadav	RJD	MGB	
East Champaran	17	Pipra	Shyambabu Prasad Yadav	BJP	NDA	
East Champaran	18	Madhuban	Rana Randhir Singh	BJP	NDA	
East Champaran	19	Motihari	Pramod Kumar	BJP	NDA	
East Champaran	20	Chiraia	Lal Babu Prasad Gupta	BJP	NDA	
East Champaran	21	Dhaka	Pawan Jaiswal	BJP	NDA	
Sheohar	22	Sheohar	Chetan Anand	JD(U)	NDA	Switched from RJD to JDU
Sitamarhi	23	Riga	Moti Lal Prasad	BJP	NDA	
Sitamarhi	24	Bathnaha	Anil Kumar	BJP	NDA	
Sitamarhi	25	Parihar	Gayatri Devi Yadav	BJP	NDA	
Sitamarhi	26	Sursand	Dilip Kumar Ray	JD(U)	NDA	
Sitamarhi	27	Bajpatti	Mukesh Kumar Yadav	RJD	MGB	
Sitamarhi	28	Sitamarhi	Mithilesh Kumar	BJP	NDA	
Sitamarhi	29	Runnisaidpur	Pankaj Kumar Mishra	JD(U)	NDA	
Sitamarhi	30	Belsand	Sanjay Kumar Gupta	RJD	MGB	
Madhubani	31	Harlakhi	Sudhanshu Shekhar	JD(U)	NDA	
Madhubani	32	Benipatti	Vinod Narayan Jha	BJP	NDA	
Madhubani	33	Khajauli	Arun Shankar Prasad	BJP	NDA	
Madhubani	34	Babubarhi	Mina Kumari	JD(U)	NDA	
Madhubani	35	Bisfi	Haribhushan Thakur	BJP	NDA	
Madhubani	36	Madhubani	Samir Kumar Mahaseth	RJD	MGB	
Madhubani	37	Rajnagar	Ram Prit Paswan	BJP	NDA	
Madhubani	38	Jhanjharpur	Nitish Mishra	BJP	NDA	
Madhubani	39	Phulparas	Sheela Kumari Mandal	JD(U)	NDA	
Madhubani	40	Laukaha	Bharat Bhushan Mandal	RJD	MGB	
Supaul	41	Nirmali	Aniruddha Prasad Yadav	JD(U)	NDA	
Supaul	42	Pipra	Rambilash Kamat	JD(U)	NDA	
Supaul	43	Supaul	Bijendra Prasad Yadav	JD(U)	NDA	
Supaul	44	Triveniganj	Veena Bharti	JD(U)	NDA	
Supaul	45	Chhatapur	Neeraj Kumar Singh	BJP	NDA	
Araria	46	Narpatganj	Jai Prakash Yadav	BJP	NDA	
Araria	47	Raniganj	Achmit Rishidev	JD(U)	NDA	
Araria	48	Forbesganj	Vidya Sagar Keshri	BJP	NDA	
Araria	49	Araria	Avidur Rahman	INC	MGB	
Araria	50	Jokihat	Mohammed Shahnawaz Alam	RJD	MGB	Switched from AIMIM to RJD
Araria	51	Sikti	Vijay Kumar Mandal	BJP	NDA	
Kishanganj	52	Bahadurganj	Mohammad Anzar Nayeemi	RJD	MGB	Switched from AIMIM to RJD
Kishanganj	53	Thakurganj	Saud Alam	RJD	MGB	
Kishanganj	54	Kishanganj	Ijaharul Hussain	INC	MGB	
Kishanganj	55	Kochadhaman	Muhammad Izhar Asfi	RJD	MGB	Switched from AIMIM to RJD
Purnia	56	Amour	Akhtarul Iman	AIMIM	None	
Purnia	57	Baisi	Syed Ruknuddin Ahmad	RJD	MGB	Switched from AIMIM to RJD
Purnia	58	Kasba	Md Afaque Alam	INC	MGB	
Purnia	59	Banmankhi	Krishna Kumar Rishi	BJP	NDA	
Purnia	60	Rupauli	Bima Bharti	JD(U)	NDA	Switched from JD(U) to RJD.
Purnia	60	Rupauli	Shankar Singh	IND	None	Elected on 13 July 2024 in By-election 2024
Purnia	61	Dhamdaha	Leshi Singh	JD(U)	NDA	
Purnia	62	Purnia	Vijay Kumar Khemka	BJP	NDA	
Katihar	63	Katihar	Tarkishore Prasad	BJP	NDA	
Katihar	64	Kadwa	Shakeel Ahmad Khan	INC	MGB	
Katihar	65	Balrampur	Mahbub Alam	CPI(ML)L	MGB	
Katihar	66	Pranpur	Nisha Singh	BJP	NDA	
Katihar	67	Manihari	Manohar Prasad Singh	INC	MGB	
Katihar	68	Barari	Bijay Singh	JD(U)	NDA	
Katihar	69	Korha	Kavita Devi	BJP	NDA	
Madhepura	70	Alamnagar	Narendra Narayan Yadav	JD(U)	NDA	
Madhepura	71	Bihariganj	Niranjan Kumar Mehta	JD(U)	NDA	
Madhepura	72	Singheshwar	Chandrahas Chaupal	RJD	MGB	
Madhepura	73	Madhepura	Chandra Shekhar Yadav	RJD	MGB	
Saharsa	74	Sonbarsha	Ratnesh Sada	JD(U)	NDA	
Saharsa	75	Saharsa	Alok Ranjan Jha	BJP	NDA	
Saharsa	76	Simri Bakhtiarpur	Yusuf Salahuddin	RJD	MGB	
Saharsa	77	Mahishi	Gunjeshwar Sah	JD(U)	NDA	
Darbhanga	78	Kusheshwar Asthan	Shashi Bhushan Hazari	JD(U)	NDA	Died in 1 July 2021
Darbhanga	78	Kusheshwar Asthan	Aman Bhushan Hajari	JD(U)	NDA	Elected on 2 November 2021 in by-election
Darbhanga	79	Gaura Bauram	Swarna Singh	BJP	NDA	Switched from VIP to BJP
Darbhanga	80	Benipur	Binay Kumar Choudhary	JD(U)	NDA	
Darbhanga	81	Alinagar	Mishrilal Yadav	BJP	NDA	Switched from VIP to BJP
Darbhanga	82	Darbhanga Rural	Lalit Kumar Yadav	RJD	MGB	
Darbhanga	83	Darbhanga	Sanjay Saraogi	BJP	NDA	
Darbhanga	84	Hayaghat	Ram Chandra Prasad	BJP	NDA	
Darbhanga	85	Bahadurpur	Madan Sahni	JD(U)	NDA	
Darbhanga	86	Keoti	Murari Mohan Jha	BJP	NDA	
Darbhanga	87	Jale	Jibesh Kumar	BJP	NDA	
Muzaffarpur	88	Gaighat	Niranjan Roy	RJD	MGB	
Muzaffarpur	89	Aurai	Ram Surat Rai	BJP	NDA	
Muzaffarpur	90	Minapur	Munna Yadav	RJD	MGB	
Muzaffarpur	91	Bochahan	Musafir Paswan	VIP	NDA	Died in November 2021
Muzaffarpur	91	Bochahan	Amar Kumar Paswan	RJD	MGB	Won in 2022 by-poll necessitated after the death of Musafir Paswan.
Muzaffarpur	92	Sakra	Ashok Kumar Choudhary	JD(U)	NDA	
Muzaffarpur	93	Kurhani	Anil Kumar Sahni	RJD	MGB	Disqualified on 14 October 2022 after criminal conviction
Muzaffarpur	93	Kurhani	Kedar Prasad Gupta	BJP	NDA	Won by-poll in 2022.
Muzaffarpur	94	Muzaffarpur	Bijendra Chaudhary	INC	MGB	
Muzaffarpur	95	Kanti	Mohammad Israil Mansuri	RJD	MGB	
Muzaffarpur	96	Baruraj	Arun Kumar Singh (politician)	BJP	NDA	
Muzaffarpur	97	Paroo	Ashok Kumar Singh	BJP	NDA	
Muzaffarpur	98	Sahebganj	Raju Kumar Singh	BJP	NDA	Switched from VIP to BJP
Gopalganj	99	Baikunthpur	Prem Shankar Yadav	RJD	MGB	
Gopalganj	100	Barauli	Rampravesh Rai	BJP	NDA	
Gopalganj	101	Gopalganj	Subhash Singh	BJP	NDA	Death of Subhash Singh
Gopalganj	101	Gopalganj	Kusum Devi	BJP	NDA	Won in 2022 bypoll
Gopalganj	102	Kuchaikote	Amrendra Kumar Pandey	JD(U)	NDA	
Gopalganj	103	Bhore	Sunil Kumar	JD(U)	NDA	
Gopalganj	104	Hathua	Rajesh Kumar Singh	RJD	MGB	
Siwan	105	Siwan	Awadh Bihari Yadav	RJD	MGB	
Siwan	106	Ziradei	Amarjeet Kushwaha	CPI(ML)L	MGB	
Siwan	107	Darauli	Satyadeo Ram	CPI(ML)L	MGB	
Siwan	108	Raghunathpur	Hari Shankar Yadav	RJD	MGB	
Siwan	109	Daraunda	Karanjeet Singh	BJP	NDA	
Siwan	110	Barharia	Bachcha Pandey	RJD	MGB	
Siwan	111	Goriakothi	Devesh Kant Singh	BJP	NDA	
Siwan	112	Maharajganj	Vijay Shanker Dubey	INC	MGB	
Saran	113	Ekma	Srikant Yadav	RJD	MGB	
Saran	114	Manjhi	Satyendra Yadav	CPI(M)	MGB	
Saran	115	Baniapur	Kedar Nath Singh	RJD	MGB	
Saran	116	Taraiya	Janak Singh	BJP	NDA	
Saran	117	Marhaura	Jitendra Kumar Ray	RJD	MGB	
Saran	118	Chapra	C. N. Gupta	BJP	NDA	
Saran	119	Garkha	Surendra Ram	RJD	MGB	
Saran	120	Amnour	Krishan Kumar Mantoo	BJP	NDA	
Saran	121	Parsa	Chhote Lal Ray	RJD	MGB	
Saran	122	Sonpur	Ramanuj Prasad Yadav	RJD	MGB	
Vaishali	123	Hajipur	Awadhesh Singh	BJP	NDA	
Vaishali	124	Lalganj	Sanjay Kumar Singh	BJP	NDA	
Vaishali	125	Vaishali	Siddharth Patel	JD(U)	NDA	
Vaishali	126	Mahua	Mukesh Raushan Yadav	RJD	MGB	
Vaishali	127	Raja Pakar	Pratima Kumari	INC	MGB	
Vaishali	128	Raghopur	Tejashwi Yadav	RJD	MGB	
Vaishali	129	Mahnar	Bina Singh	RJD	MGB	
Vaishali	130	Patepur	Lakhendra Kumar Raushan	BJP	NDA	
Samastipur	131	Kalyanpur	Maheshwar Hazari	JD(U)	NDA	
Samastipur	132	Warisnagar	Ashok Kumar	JD(U)	NDA	
Samastipur	133	Samastipur	Akhtarul Islam Sahin	RJD	MGB	
Samastipur	134	Ujiarpur	Alok Kumar Mehta	RJD	MGB	
Samastipur	135	Morwa	Ranvijay Sahu	RJD	MGB	
Samastipur	136	Sarairanjan	Vijay Kumar Chaudhary	JD(U)	NDA	
Samastipur	137	Mohiuddinnagar	Rajesh Kumar Singh	BJP	NDA	
Samastipur	138	Bibhutipur	Ajay Kumar	CPI(M)	MGB	
Samastipur	139	Rosera	Birendra Kumar	BJP	NDA	
Samastipur	140	Hasanpur	Tej Pratap Yadav	RJD	MGB	
Begusarai	141	Cheria-Bariarpur	Raj Banshi Mahto	RJD	MGB	
Begusarai	142	Bachhwara	Surendra Mehata	BJP	NDA	
Begusarai	143	Teghra	Ram Ratan Singh	CPI	MGB	
Begusarai	144	Matihani	Raj Kumar Singh	JD(U)	NDA	Switched from LJP to JD(U)
Begusarai	145	Sahebpur Kamal	Sadanand Yadav	RJD	MGB	
Begusarai	146	Begusarai	Kundan Kumar	BJP	NDA	
Begusarai	147	Bakhri	Suryakant Paswan	CPI	MGB	
Khagaria	148	Alauli	Ramvrikish Sada	RJD	MGB	
Khagaria	149	Khagaria	Chhatrapati Yadav	INC	MGB	
Khagaria	150	Beldaur	Panna Lal Singh Patel	JD(U)	NDA	
Khagaria	151	Parbatta	Sanjeev Kumar	JD(U)	NDA	
Bhagalpur	152	Bihpur	Kumar Shailendra	BJP	NDA	
Bhagalpur	153	Gopalpur	Narendra Kumar Niraj	JD(U)	NDA	
Bhagalpur	154	Pirpainti	Lalan Kumar	BJP	NDA	
Bhagalpur	155	Kahalgaon	Pawan Kumar Yadav	BJP	NDA	
Bhagalpur	156	Bhagalpur	Ajeet Sharma	INC	MGB	
Bhagalpur	157	Sultanganj	Lalit Narayan Mandal	JD(U)	NDA	
Bhagalpur	158	Nathnagar	Ali Ashraf Siddiqui	RJD	MGB	
Banka	159	Amarpur	Jayant Raj Kushwaha	JD(U)	NDA	
Banka	160	Dhoraiya	Bhudeo Choudhary	RJD	MGB	
Banka	161	Banka	Ramnarayan Mandal	BJP	NDA	
Banka	162	Katoria	Nikki Hembrom	BJP	NDA	
Banka	163	Belhar	Manoj Yadav	JD(U)	NDA	
Munger	164	Tarapur	Mewa Lal Choudhary	JD(U)	NDA	Died on 19 April 2021 due to COVID-19
Munger	164	Tarapur	Rajeev Kumar Singh	JD(U)	NDA	Elected on 2 November 2021 in by-election
Munger	165	Munger	Pranav Kumar Yadav	BJP	NDA	
Munger	166	Jamalpur	Ajay Kumar Singh	INC	MGB	
Lakhisarai	167	Suryagarha	Prahlad Yadav	JD(U)	NDA	Switched from RJD to JDU
Lakhisarai	168	Lakhisarai	Vijay Kumar Sinha	BJP	NDA	Deputy Leader of BJP
Sheikhpura	169	Sheikhpura	Vijay Kumar Yadav	RJD	MGB	
Sheikhpura	170	Barbigha	Sudarshan Kumar	JD(U)	NDA	
Nalanda	171	Asthawan	Jitendra Kumar	JD(U)	NDA	
Nalanda	172	Biharsharif	Sunil Kumar	BJP	NDA	
Nalanda	173	Rajgir	Kaushal Kishore	JD(U)	NDA	
Nalanda	174	Islampur	Rakesh Raushan Yadav	RJD	MGB	
Nalanda	175	Hilsa	Krishna Murari Sharan	JD(U)	NDA	
Nalanda	176	Nalanda	Shrawan Kumar	JD(U)	NDA	
Nalanda	177	Harnaut	Hari Narayan Singh	JD(U)	NDA	
Patna	178	Mokama	Anant Kumar Singh	RJD	MGB	Disqualified in July 2022 due to criminal conviction
Patna	178	Mokama	Nilam Devi	JD(U)	NDA	*Won in 2022 bypoll: Switched from RJD to JDU
Patna	179	Barh	Gyanendra Kumar Singh	BJP	NDA	
Patna	180	Bakhtiarpur	Aniruddh Kumar Yadav	RJD	MGB	
Patna	181	Digha	Sanjeev Chaurasiya	BJP	NDA	
Patna	182	Bankipur	Nitin Nabin	BJP	NDA	
Patna	183	Kumhrar	Arun Kumar Sinha	BJP	NDA	
Patna	184	Patna Sahib	Nand Kishore Yadav	BJP	NDA	
Patna	185	Fatuha	Rama Nand Yadav	RJD	MGB	
Patna	186	Danapur	Ritlal Yadav	RJD	MGB	
Patna	187	Maner	Bhai Virendra Yadav	RJD	MGB	
Patna	188	Phulwari	Gopal Ravidas	CPI(ML)L	MGB	
Patna	189	Masaurhi	Rekha Devi	RJD	MGB	
Patna	190	Paliganj	Sandeep Yadav	CPI(ML)L	MGB	
Patna	191	Bikram	Siddharth Saurav	BJP	NDA	Switched from INC to BJP
Bhojpur	192	Sandesh	Kiran Devi Yadav	RJD	MGB	
Bhojpur	193	Barhara	Raghvendra Pratap Singh	BJP	NDA	
Bhojpur	194	Arrah	Amrendra Pratap Singh	BJP	NDA	
Bhojpur	195	Agiaon	Manoj Manzil	CPI(ML)L	MGB	Disqualified on 16 February 2024 due to criminal conviction
Bhojpur	195	Agiaon	Shiv Prakash Ranjan	CPI(ML)L	MGB	
Bhojpur	196	Tarari	Sudama Prasad	CPI(ML)L	MGB	
Bhojpur	196	Tarari	Vishal Prashant	BJP	NDA	Won in 2024 bypoll
Bhojpur	197	Jagdishpur	Ram Vishnun Yadav	RJD	MGB	
Bhojpur	198	Shahpur	Rahul Tiwari	RJD	MGB	
Buxar	199	Brahampur	Shambhu Nath Yadav	RJD	MGB	
Buxar	200	Buxar	Sanjay Kumar Tiwari	INC	MGB	
Buxar	201	Dumraon	Ajit Kumar Singh	CPI(ML)L	MGB	
Buxar	202	Rajpur	Vishwanath Ram	INC	MGB	
Kaimur	203	Ramgarh	Sudhakar Singh	RJD	MGB	
Kaimur	203	Ramgarh	Ashok Kumar Singh	BJP	NDA	Won in 2024 bypoll
Kaimur	204	Mohania	Sangita Kumari	BJP	NDA	Switched from RJD to BJP
Kaimur	205	Bhabua	Bharat Bind	BJP	NDA	Switched from RJD to BJP
Kaimur	206	Chainpur	Mohd Zama Khan	JD(U)	NDA	Switched from BSP to JD(U)
Rohtas	207	Chenari	Murari Prasad Gautam	BJP	NDA	Switched from INC to BJP
Rohtas	208	Sasaram	Rajesh Kumar Gupta	RJD	MGB	
Rohtas	209	Kargahar	Santhosh Kumar Mishra	INC	MGB	
Rohtas	210	Dinara	Vijay Yadav	RJD	MGB	
Rohtas	211	Nokha	Anita Devi	RJD	MGB	
Rohtas	212	Dehri	Fateh Bahadur Singh	RJD	MGB	
Rohtas	213	Karakat	Arun Singh	CPI(ML)L	MGB	
Arwal	214	Arwal	Maha Nand Singh	CPI(ML)L	MGB	
Arwal	215	Kurtha	Bagi Kumar Verma	RJD	MGB	
Jehanabad	216	Jehanabad	Suday Yadav	RJD	MGB	
Jehanabad	217	Ghosi	Ram Bali Singh Yadav	CPI(ML)L	MGB	
Jehanabad	218	Makhdumpur	Satish Kumar	RJD	MGB	
Aurangabad	219	Goh	Bhim Kumar Singh	RJD	MGB	
Aurangabad	220	Obra	Rishi Yadav	RJD	MGB	
Aurangabad	221	Nabinagar	Vijay Kumar Singh	RJD	MGB	
Aurangabad	222	Kutumba	Rajesh Kumar	INC	MGB	
Aurangabad	223	Aurangabad	Anand Shankar Singh	INC	MGB	
Aurangabad	224	Rafiganj	MD Nehaluddin	RJD	MGB	
Gaya	225	Gurua	Vinay Yadav	RJD	MGB	
Gaya	226	Sherghati	Manju Agrawal	RJD	MGB	
Gaya	227	Imamganj	Jitan Ram Manjhi	HAM(S)	NDA	
Gaya	227	Imamganj	Deepa Manjhi	HAM(S)	NDA	Won in 2024 bypoll
Gaya	228	Barachatti	Jyoti Devi	HAM(S)	NDA	
Gaya	229	Bodh Gaya	Kumar Sarvjeet	RJD	MGB	
Gaya	230	Gaya Town	Prem Kumar	BJP	NDA	
Gaya	231	Tikari	Anil Kumar	HAM(S)	NDA	
Gaya	232	Belaganj	Surendra Prasad Yadav	RJD	MGB	
Gaya	232	Belaganj	Manorama Devi	JD(U)	NDA	Won in 2024 bypoll
Gaya	233	Atri	Ajay Kumar Yadav	RJD	MGB	
Gaya	234	Wazirganj	Birendra Singh	BJP	NDA	
Nawada	235	Rajauli	Prakash Veer	RJD	MGB	
Nawada	236	Hisua	Nitu Kumari	INC	MGB	
Nawada	237	Nawada	Vibha Devi Yadav	RJD	MGB	
Nawada	238	Gobindpur	Md Kamran	RJD	MGB	
Nawada	239	Warsaliganj	Aruna Devi	BJP	NDA	
Jamui	240	Sikandra	Prafull Kumar Manjhi	HAM(S)	NDA	
Jamui	241	Jamui	Shreyasi Singh	BJP	NDA	
Jamui	242	Jhajha	Damodar Rawat	JD(U)	NDA	
Jamui	243	Chakai	Sumit Kumar Singh	IND	NDA	
