= 18th Bihar Assembly =

18th Bihar Legislative Assembly

18th Bihar Legislative Assembly
←	17th Assembly

Overview
- Legislative body: Bihar Legislative Assembly
- Term: 1 December 2025 –
- Election: 2025 Bihar Legislative Assembly election
- Government: NDA (201): BJP (88); JD(U) (85); LJP(RV) (19); HAM(S) (5); RLM (4)
- Opposition: MGB (35): RJD (25); INC (6); CPI(ML)L (2); CPI(M) (1); IIP (1); Other opposition (7): AIMIM (5); BSP (1); JSP (1)

Nominal Executive
- Governor: Syed Ata Hasnain

Bihar Legislative Assembly
- Members: 243
- Speaker: Prem Kumar (2025 – present)
- Deputy Speaker: Narendra Narayan Yadav
- Chief Minister: Nitish Kumar (1 December 2025 - 14 April 2026); Samrat Chaudhary (Since 15 April 2026)
- Deputy Chief Minister: Samrat Choudhary (1 December 2025 - 14 April 2026); Vijay Kumar Sinha (1 December 2025 - 14 April 2026); Vijay Kumar Chaudhary (Since 15 April 2026); Bijendra Prasad Yadav (Since 15 April 2026)
- Leader of the House: Samrat Choudhary
- Leader of the Opposition: Tejashwi Yadav, RJD

The Eighteenth Legislative Assembly of Bihar (Eighteenth Vidhan Sabha of Bihar) was constituted on 20 November 2025 as a result of Bihar Legislative Assembly election, 2025 held on 6 and 11 November 2025.

== Composition ==
Alliance	Political party	No. of MLAs	Leader of the party
Government; NDA; Seats: 200	Bharatiya Janata Party	88	Samrat Choudhary (Chief Minister)
Government; NDA; Seats: 200	Janata Dal (United)	84	Shrawan Kumar
Government; NDA; Seats: 200	Lok Janshakti Party (Ram Vilas)	19	Raju Tiwari
Government; NDA; Seats: 200	Hindustani Awam Morcha (Secular)	5	Prafull Kumar Singh
Government; NDA; Seats: 200	Rashtriya Lok Morcha	4	Madhav Anand
Opposition; MGB; Seats: 35	Rashtriya Janata Dal	25	Tejashwi Yadav (Leader of the Opposition)
Opposition; MGB; Seats: 35	Indian National Congress	6	
Opposition; MGB; Seats: 35	Communist Party of India (Marxist–Leninist) Liberation	2	
Opposition; MGB; Seats: 35	Indian Inclusive Party	1	Indrajeet Prasad Gupta
Opposition; MGB; Seats: 35	Communist Party of India (Marxist)	1	Ajay Kumar
Others; Seats: 8	All India Majlis-e-Ittehadul Muslimeen	5	Akhtarul Iman
Others; Seats: 8	Bahujan Samaj Party	1	Satish Kumar Yadav
Others; Seats: 8	Jan Suraaj Party	1	Prashant Kishor
Others; Seats: 8	Independent	1	Anant Kumar Singh (Note: 178-Mokama MLA Anant Kumar Singh was expelled from JD(U) on 25 October 2026.)
Total		243	

== Members of Legislative Assembly ==
Full list of elected candidates

District	No.	Constituency	Name	Party	Alliance	Remarks
West Champaran	1	Valmiki Nagar	Surendra Prasad Kushwaha	INC	MGB	
West Champaran	2	Ramnagar (SC)	Nand Kishor Ram	BJP	NDA	
West Champaran	3	Narkatiaganj	Sanjay Kumar Pandey	BJP	NDA	
West Champaran	4	Bagaha	Ram Singh	BJP	NDA	
West Champaran	5	Lauriya	Vinay Bihari	BJP	NDA	
West Champaran	6	Nautan	Narayan Prasad	BJP	NDA	Minister
West Champaran	7	Chanpatia	Abhishek Ranjan	INC	MGB	
West Champaran	8	Bettiah	Renu Devi	BJP	NDA	
West Champaran	9	Sikta	Sammridh Varma	JD(U)	NDA	
East Champaran	10	Raxaul	Pramod Kumar Sinha	BJP	NDA	
East Champaran	11	Sugauli	Rajesh Kumar	LJP(RV)	NDA	
East Champaran	12	Narkatiya	Vishal Kumar	JD(U)	NDA	
East Champaran	13	Harsidhi (SC)	Krishnanandan Paswan	BJP	NDA	
East Champaran	14	Govindganj	Raju Tiwari	LJP(RV)	NDA	
East Champaran	15	Kesaria	Shalini Mishra	JD(U)	NDA	
East Champaran	16	Kalyanpur	Sachindra Prasad Singh	BJP	NDA	
East Champaran	17	Pipra	Shyambabu Prasad Yadav	BJP	NDA	
East Champaran	18	Madhuban	Rana Randhir Singh	BJP	NDA	
East Champaran	19	Motihari	Pramod Kumar	BJP	NDA	Minister
East Champaran	20	Chiraia	Lal Babu Prasad Gupta	BJP	NDA	
East Champaran	21	Dhaka	Faisal Rahman	RJD	MGB	
Sheohar	22	Sheohar	Shweta Gupta	JD(U)	NDA	
Sitamarhi	23	Riga	Baidyanath Prasad	BJP	NDA	
Sitamarhi	24	Bathnaha (SC)	Anil Kumar	BJP	NDA	
Sitamarhi	25	Parihar	Gayatri Devi Yadav	BJP	NDA	
Sitamarhi	26	Sursand	Nagendra Raut	JD(U)	NDA	
Sitamarhi	27	Bajpatti	Rameshwar Mahto	RLM	NDA	
Sitamarhi	28	Sitamarhi	Sunil Kumar Pintu	BJP	NDA	
Sitamarhi	29	Runnisaidpur	Pankaj Kumar Mishra	JD(U)	NDA	
Sitamarhi	30	Belsand	Amit Kumar	LJP(RV)	NDA	
Madhubani	31	Harlakhi	Sudhanshu Shekhar	JD(U)	NDA	
Madhubani	32	Benipatti	Vinod Narayan Jha	BJP	NDA	
Madhubani	33	Khajauli	Arun Shankar Prasad	BJP	NDA	Minister
Madhubani	34	Babubarhi	Mina Kumari	JD(U)	NDA	
Madhubani	35	Bisfi	Asif Ahmad	RJD	MGB	
Madhubani	36	Madhubani	Madhav Anand	RLM	NDA	
Madhubani	37	Rajnagar (SC)	Sujit Paswan	BJP	NDA	
Madhubani	38	Jhanjharpur	Nitish Mishra	BJP	NDA	
Madhubani	39	Phulparas	Sheela Kumari Mandal	JD(U)	NDA	
Madhubani	40	Laukaha	Satish Kumar Sah	JD(U)	NDA	
Supaul	41	Nirmali	Aniruddha Prasad Yadav	JD(U)	NDA	
Supaul	42	Pipra	Rambilash Kamat	JD(U)	NDA	
Supaul	43	Supaul	Bijendra Prasad Yadav	JD(U)	NDA	Deputy Chief Minister (Since 15 April 2026)
Supaul	44	Triveniganj (SC)	Sonam Rani Sardar	JD(U)	NDA	
Supaul	45	Chhatapur	Neeraj Kumar Singh	BJP	NDA	
Araria	46	Narpatganj	Devanti Yadav	BJP	NDA	
Araria	47	Raniganj (SC)	Avinash Mangalam	RJD	MGB	
Araria	48	Forbesganj	Manoj Bishwas	INC	MGB	
Araria	49	Araria	Avidur Rahman	INC	MGB	
Araria	50	Jokihat	Mohammad Murshid Alam	AIMIM	None	
Araria	51	Sikti	Vijay Kumar Mandal	BJP	NDA	
Kishanganj	52	Bahadurganj	Mohammad Tauseef Alam	AIMIM	None	
Kishanganj	53	Thakurganj	Gopal Kumar Agarwal	JD(U)	NDA	
Kishanganj	54	Kishanganj	Qamrul Hoda	INC	MGB	
Kishanganj	55	Kochadhaman	Sarwar Alam	AIMIM	None	
Purnia	56	Amour	Akhtarul Iman	AIMIM	None	
Purnia	57	Baisi	Ghulam Sarwar	AIMIM	None	
Purnia	58	Kasba	Nitesh Kumar Singh	LJP(RV)	NDA	
Purnia	59	Banmankhi (SC)	Krishna Kumar Rishi	BJP	NDA	
Purnia	60	Rupauli	Kaladhar Mandal	JD(U)	NDA	
Purnia	61	Dhamdaha	Leshi Singh	JD(U)	NDA	
Purnia	62	Purnia	Vijay Kumar Khemka	BJP	NDA	
Katihar	63	Katihar	Tarkishore Prasad	BJP	NDA	
Katihar	64	Kadwa	Dulal Chandra Goswami	JD(U)	NDA	
Katihar	65	Balrampur	Sangita Devi	LJP(RV)	NDA	
Katihar	66	Pranpur	Nisha Singh	BJP	NDA	
Katihar	67	Manihari (ST)	Manohar Prasad Singh	INC	MGB	
Katihar	68	Barari	Bijay Singh	JD(U)	NDA	
Katihar	69	Korha (SC)	Kavita Devi	BJP	NDA	
Madhepura	70	Alamnagar	Narendra Narayan Yadav	JD(U)	NDA	Deputy Speaker
Madhepura	71	Bihariganj	Niranjan Kumar Mehta	JD(U)	NDA	
Madhepura	72	Singheshwar (SC)	Ramesh Rishidev	JD(U)	NDA	
Madhepura	73	Madhepura	Chandrashekhar Yadav	RJD	MGB	
Saharsa	74	Sonbarsha (SC)	Ratnesh Sada	JD(U)	NDA	
Saharsa	75	Saharsa	Indrajeet Prasad Gupta	IIP	MGB	
Saharsa	76	Simri Bakhtiarpur	Sanjay Kumar Singh	LJP(RV)	NDA	
Saharsa	77	Mahishi	Gautam Krishna	RJD	MGB	
Darbhanga	78	Kusheshwar Asthan (SC)	Atirek Kumar	JD(U)	NDA	
Darbhanga	79	Gaura Bauram	Sujit Kumar	BJP	NDA	
Darbhanga	80	Benipur	Binay Kumar Choudhary	JD(U)	NDA	
Darbhanga	81	Alinagar	Maithili Thakur	BJP	NDA	
Darbhanga	82	Darbhanga Rural	Rajesh Kumar Mandal	JD(U)	NDA	
Darbhanga	83	Darbhanga	Sanjay Saraogi	BJP	NDA	
Darbhanga	84	Hayaghat	Ram Chandra Prasad	BJP	NDA	
Darbhanga	85	Bahadurpur	Madan Sahni	JD(U)	NDA	
Darbhanga	86	Keoti	Murari Mohan Jha	BJP	NDA	
Darbhanga	87	Jale	Jibesh Kumar	BJP	NDA	
Muzaffarpur	88	Gaighat	Komal Singh	JD(U)	NDA	
Muzaffarpur	89	Aurai	Rama Nishad	BJP	NDA	Minister
Muzaffarpur	90	Minapur	Ajay Kushwaha	JD(U)	NDA	
Muzaffarpur	91	Bochahan (SC)	Baby Kumari	LJP(RV)	NDA	
Muzaffarpur	92	Sakra (SC)	Aditya Kumar	JD(U)	NDA	
Muzaffarpur	93	Kurhani	Kedar Prasad Gupta	BJP	NDA	
Muzaffarpur	94	Muzaffarpur	Ranjan Kumar	BJP	NDA	
Muzaffarpur	95	Kanti	Ajit Singh	JD(U)	NDA	
Muzaffarpur	96	Baruraj	Arun Kumar Singh	BJP	NDA	
Muzaffarpur	97	Paroo	Shankar Prasad Yadav	RJD	MGB	
Muzaffarpur	98	Sahebganj	Raju Kumar Singh	BJP	NDA	
Gopalganj	99	Baikunthpur	Mithlesh Tiwari	BJP	NDA	
Gopalganj	100	Barauli	Manjeet Kumar Singh	JD(U)	NDA	
Gopalganj	101	Gopalganj	Subhash Singh	BJP	NDA	
Gopalganj	102	Kuchaikote	Amrendra Kumar Pandey	JD(U)	NDA	
Gopalganj	103	Bhore (SC)	Sunil Kumar	JD(U)	NDA	
Gopalganj	104	Hathua	Ramsewak Singh Kushwaha	JD(U)	NDA	
Siwan	105	Siwan	Mangal Pandey	BJP	NDA	Minister
Siwan	106	Ziradei	Bhism Pratap Singh Kushwaha	JD(U)	NDA	
Siwan	107	Darauli (SC)	Vishnu Deo Paswan	LJP(RV)	NDA	
Siwan	108	Raghunathpur	Osama Shahab	RJD	MGB	
Siwan	109	Daraunda	Karanjeet Singh	BJP	NDA	
Siwan	110	Barharia	Indradev Patel	JD(U)	NDA	
Siwan	111	Goriakothi	Devesh Kant Singh	BJP	NDA	
Siwan	112	Maharajganj	Hemnarayan Sah	JD(U)	NDA	
Saran	113	Ekma	Manoranjan Singh Dhumal	JD(U)	NDA	
Saran	114	Manjhi	Randhir Kumar Singh	JD(U)	NDA	
Saran	115	Baniapur	Kedar Nath Singh	BJP	NDA	
Saran	116	Taraiya	Janak Singh	BJP	NDA	
Saran	117	Marhaura	Jitendra Kumar Ray	RJD	MGB	
Saran	118	Chapra	Chhoti Kumari	BJP	NDA	
Saran	119	Garkha (SC)	Surendra Ram	RJD	MGB	
Saran	120	Amnour	Krishan Kumar Mantoo	BJP	NDA	
Saran	121	Parsa	Karishma Rai	RJD	MGB	
Saran	122	Sonpur	Vinay Kumar Singh	BJP	NDA	
Vaishali	123	Hajipur	Awadhesh Singh	BJP	NDA	
Vaishali	124	Lalganj	Sanjay Kumar Singh	BJP	NDA	
Vaishali	125	Vaishali	Siddharth Patel	JD(U)	NDA	
Vaishali	126	Mahua	Sanjay Kumar Singh	LJP(RV)	NDA	Minister
Vaishali	127	Raja Pakar (SC)	Mahendra Ram	JD(U)	NDA	
Vaishali	128	Raghopur	Tejashwi Yadav	RJD	MGB	
Vaishali	129	Mahnar	Umesh Singh Kushwaha	JD(U)	NDA	
Vaishali	130	Patepur (SC)	Lakhendra Kumar Raushan	BJP	NDA	Minister
Samastipur	131	Kalyanpur	Maheshwar Hazari	JD(U)	NDA	
Samastipur	132	Warisnagar	Manjarik Mrinal	JD(U)	NDA	
Samastipur	133	Samastipur	Ashwamedh Devi	JD(U)	NDA	
Samastipur	134	Ujiarpur	Alok Kumar Mehta	RJD	MGB	
Samastipur	135	Morwa	Ranvijay Sahu	RJD	MGB	
Samastipur	136	Sarairanjan	Vijay Kumar Chaudhary	JD(U)	NDA	Deputy Chief Minister (Since 15 April 2026)
Samastipur	137	Mohiuddinnagar	Rajesh Kumar Singh	BJP	NDA	
Samastipur	138	Bibhutipur	Ajay Kumar Kushwaha	CPI(M)	MGB	
Samastipur	139	Rosera (SC)	Birendra Kumar	BJP	NDA	
Samastipur	140	Hasanpur	Raj Kumar Ray	JD(U)	NDA	
Begusarai	141	Cheria-Bariarpur	Sushil Kumar	JD(U)	NDA	
Begusarai	142	Bachhwara	Surendra Mehata	BJP	NDA	Minister
Begusarai	143	Teghra	Rajnish Kumar Singh	BJP	NDA	
Begusarai	144	Matihani	Narendra Kumar Singh	RJD	MGB	
Begusarai	145	Sahebpur Kamal	Sadanand Yadav	RJD	MGB	
Begusarai	146	Begusarai	Kundan Kumar	BJP	NDA	
Begusarai	147	Bakhri (SC)	Sanjay Paswan	LJP(RV)	NDA	
Khagaria	148	Alauli (SC)	Ram Chandra Sada	JD(U)	NDA	
Khagaria	149	Khagaria	Bablu Mandal	JD(U)	NDA	
Khagaria	150	Beldaur	Panna Lal Singh Patel	JD(U)	NDA	
Khagaria	151	Parbatta	Aditya Kumar Shorya	LJP(RV)	NDA	
Bhagalpur	152	Bihpur	Kumar Shailendra	BJP	NDA	
Bhagalpur	153	Gopalpur	Shailesh Kumar Mandal	JD(U)	NDA	
Bhagalpur	154	Pirpainti (SC)	Murari Paswan	BJP	NDA	
Bhagalpur	155	Kahalgaon	Shubhanand Mukesh	JD(U)	NDA	
Bhagalpur	156	Bhagalpur	Rohit Pandey	BJP	NDA	
Bhagalpur	157	Sultanganj	Lalit Narayan Mandal	JD(U)	NDA	
Bhagalpur	158	Nathnagar	Mithun Yadav	LJP(RV)	NDA	
Banka	159	Amarpur	Jayant Raj Kushwaha	JD(U)	NDA	
Banka	160	Dhoraiya (SC)	Manish Kumar	JD(U)	NDA	
Banka	161	Banka	Ramnarayan Mandal	BJP	NDA	
Banka	162	Katoria (ST)	Puran Lal Tudu	BJP	NDA	
Banka	163	Belhar	Manoj Yadav	JD(U)	NDA	
Munger	164	Tarapur	Samrat Choudhary	BJP	NDA	Chief Minister
Munger	165	Munger	Kumar Pranay	BJP	NDA	
Munger	166	Jamalpur	Nachiketa Mandal	JD(U)	NDA	
Lakhisarai	167	Suryagarha	Ramanand Mandal	JD(U)	NDA	
Lakhisarai	168	Lakhisarai	Vijay Kumar Sinha	BJP	NDA	Deputy Chief Minister (Till 14 April 2026)
Sheikhpura	169	Sheikhpura	Randhir Kumar Soni	JD(U)	NDA	
Sheikhpura	170	Barbigha	Kumar Puspanjay	JD(U)	NDA	
Nalanda	171	Asthawan	Jitendra Kumar	JD(U)	NDA	
Nalanda	172	Biharsharif	Sunil Kumar	BJP	NDA	
Nalanda	173	Rajgir (SC)	Kaushal Kishore	JD(U)	NDA	
Nalanda	174	Islampur	Ruhail Ranjan	JD(U)	NDA	
Nalanda	175	Hilsa	Krishna Murari Sharan	JD(U)	NDA	
Nalanda	176	Nalanda	Shrawan Kumar	JD(U)	NDA	Minister
Nalanda	177	Harnaut	Hari Narayan Singh	JD(U)	NDA	
Patna	178	Mokama	Anant Kumar Singh	IND	None	Expelled from JD(U) on 25 October 2026.
Patna	179	Barh	Siyaram Singh	BJP	NDA	
Patna	180	Bakhtiarpur	Arun Kumar	LJP(RV)	NDA	
Patna	181	Digha	Sanjiv Chaurasiya	BJP	NDA	
Patna	182	Bankipur	Nitin Nabin	BJP	NDA	Resigned on 30 March 2026
Patna	182	Bankipur	Prashant Kishor	JSP	None	Elected on 3 August 2026
Patna	183	Kumhrar	Sanjay Kumar	BJP	NDA	
Patna	184	Patna Sahib	Ratnesh Kumar Kushwaha	BJP	NDA	
Patna	185	Fatuha	Rama Nand Yadav	RJD	MGB	
Patna	186	Danapur	Ram Kripal Yadav	BJP	NDA	Minister
Patna	187	Maner	Virendra Yadav	RJD	MGB	
Patna	188	Phulwari (SC)	Shyam Rajak	JD(U)	NDA	
Patna	189	Masaurhi (SC)	Arun Manjhi	JD(U)	NDA	
Patna	190	Paliganj	Sandeep Yadav	CPI(ML)L	MGB	
Patna	191	Bikram	Siddharth Saurav	BJP	NDA	
Bhojpur	192	Sandesh	Radha Charan Sah	JD(U)	NDA	
Bhojpur	193	Barhara	Raghvendra Pratap Singh	BJP	NDA	
Bhojpur	194	Arrah	Sanjay Singh Tiger	BJP	NDA	Minister
Bhojpur	195	Agiaon (SC)	Mahesh Paswan	BJP	NDA	
Bhojpur	196	Tarari	Vishal Prashant	BJP	NDA	
Bhojpur	197	Jagdishpur	Bhagwan Singh Kushwaha	JD(U)	NDA	
Bhojpur	198	Shahpur	Rakesh Ojha	BJP	NDA	
Buxar	199	Brahampur	Shambhu Nath Yadav	RJD	MGB	
Buxar	200	Buxar	Anand Mishra	BJP	NDA	
Buxar	201	Dumraon	Rahul Kumar Singh	JD(U)	NDA	
Buxar	202	Rajpur (SC)	Santosh Kumar Nirala	JD(U)	NDA	
Kaimur	203	Ramgarh	Satish Kumar Singh Yadav	BSP	None	
Kaimur	204	Mohania (SC)	Sangita Kumari	BJP	NDA	
Kaimur	205	Bhabua	Bharat Bind	BJP	NDA	
Kaimur	206	Chainpur	Mohammad Zama Khan	JD(U)	NDA	
Rohtas	207	Chenari (SC)	Murari Prasad Gautam	LJP(RV)	NDA	
Rohtas	208	Sasaram	Snehlata Kushwaha	RLM	NDA	
Rohtas	209	Kargahar	Bashisth Singh	JD(U)	NDA	
Rohtas	210	Dinara	Alok Kumar Singh	RLM	NDA	
Rohtas	211	Nokha	Nagendra Chandravanshi	JD(U)	NDA	
Rohtas	212	Dehri	Rajeev Ranjan Singh	LJP(RV)	NDA	
Rohtas	213	Karakat	Arun Singh Kushwaha	CPI(ML)L	MGB	
Arwal	214	Arwal	Manoj Kumar	BJP	NDA	
Arwal	215	Kurtha	Pappu Verma	JD(U)	NDA	
Jehanabad	216	Jehanabad	Rahul Sharma	RJD	MGB	
Jehanabad	217	Ghosi	Rituraj Kumar	JD(U)	NDA	
Jehanabad	218	Makhdumpur (SC)	Subedar Das	RJD	MGB	
Aurangabad	219	Goh	Amrender Kushwaha	RJD	MGB	
Aurangabad	220	Obra	Prakash Chandra	LJP(RV)	NDA	
Aurangabad	221	Nabinagar	Chetan Anand	JD(U)	NDA	
Aurangabad	222	Kutumba (SC)	Lalan Ram	HAM(S)	NDA	
Aurangabad	223	Aurangabad	Trivikram Singh	BJP	NDA	
Aurangabad	224	Rafiganj	Pramod Kumar Singh	JD(U)	NDA	
Gaya	225	Gurua	Upendra Prasad	BJP	NDA	
Gaya	226	Sherghati	Uday Kumar Singh	LJP(RV)	NDA	
Gaya	227	Imamganj (SC)	Deepa Manjhi	HAM(S)	NDA	
Gaya	228	Barachatti (SC)	Jyoti Devi	HAM(S)	NDA	
Gaya	229	Bodh Gaya (SC)	Kumar Sarvjeet	RJD	MGB	
Gaya	230	Gaya Town	Prem Kumar	BJP	NDA	Speaker
Gaya	231	Tikari	Ajay Dangi	RJD	MGB	
Gaya	232	Belaganj	Manorama Devi	JD(U)	NDA	
Gaya	233	Atri	Romit Kumar	HAM(S)	NDA	
Gaya	234	Wazirganj	Birendra Singh	BJP	NDA	
Nawada	235	Rajauli (SC)	Vimala Rajvanshi	LJP(RV)	NDA	
Nawada	236	Hisua	Anil Singh	BJP	NDA	
Nawada	237	Nawada	Vibha Devi Yadav	JD(U)	NDA	
Nawada	238	Gobindpur	Binita Mehta	LJP(RV)	NDA	
Nawada	239	Warsaliganj	Anita Mahto	RJD	MGB	
Jamui	240	Sikandra (SC)	Prafull Kumar Manjhi	HAM(S)	NDA	
Jamui	241	Jamui	Shreyasi Singh	BJP	NDA	Minister
Jamui	242	Jhajha	Damodar Rawat	JD(U)	NDA	
Jamui	243	Chakai	Savitri Devi	RJD	MGB	
