= Gopal Kumar Agarwal =

Indian politician

Member of the Bihar Legislative Assembly
- Incumbent
- Assumed office 2025
- Preceded by: Saud Alam
- In office 2005–2010
- Preceded by: Mohammad Jawed
- Succeeded by: Naushad Alam
- Constituency: Thakurganj

Personal details
- Party: Janata Dal (United)
- Relations: Tara Chandra Agarwal (Father)
- Profession: Business, Politics

Gopal Kumar Agarwal is an Indian politician and a member of the Bihar Legislative Assembly. He hails from Thakurganj town in the Kishanganj district of Bihar. He passed his intermediate class from M. A. Azad National College in Thakurganj. Belonging to the Janata Dal (United) party, he contested and won the 2025 Bihar Legislative Assembly election from the Thakurganj Assembly constituency and became a Member of the Legislative Assembly.

== Electoral Performance ==
=== 2025 ===
2025 Bihar Legislative Assembly election: Thakurganj
Party	Candidate	Votes	%	±%
JD(U)	Gopal Kumar Agarwal	85,243	34.71	▲23.25
AIMIM	Ghulam Hasnain	76,421	31.12	▲21.3
RJD	Saud Alam	60,036	24.45	▼17.03
JSP	Mohammad Ekramul Haque	6,806	2.77	New entry
Independent	Basudev Singh	3,814	1.55	New entry
NOTA	None of the above	3,609	1.47	▼0.07
Majority		8,822	3.59	▼8.81
Turnout		2,45,567	81.32	▲15.18
JD(U) gain from RJD		Swing		
