= Kishanganj Lok Sabha constituency =

Lok Sabha Constituency in Bihar

Coordinates: 26.1°N 87.9°E

Kishanganj BR-10
- Lok Sabha constituency

Constituency details
- Country: India
- Region: East India
- State: Bihar
- Assembly constituencies: Bahadurganj; Thakurganj; Kishanganj; Kochadhaman; Amour; Baisi
- Established: 1957
- Reservation: None

Member of Parliament
- 18th Lok Sabha
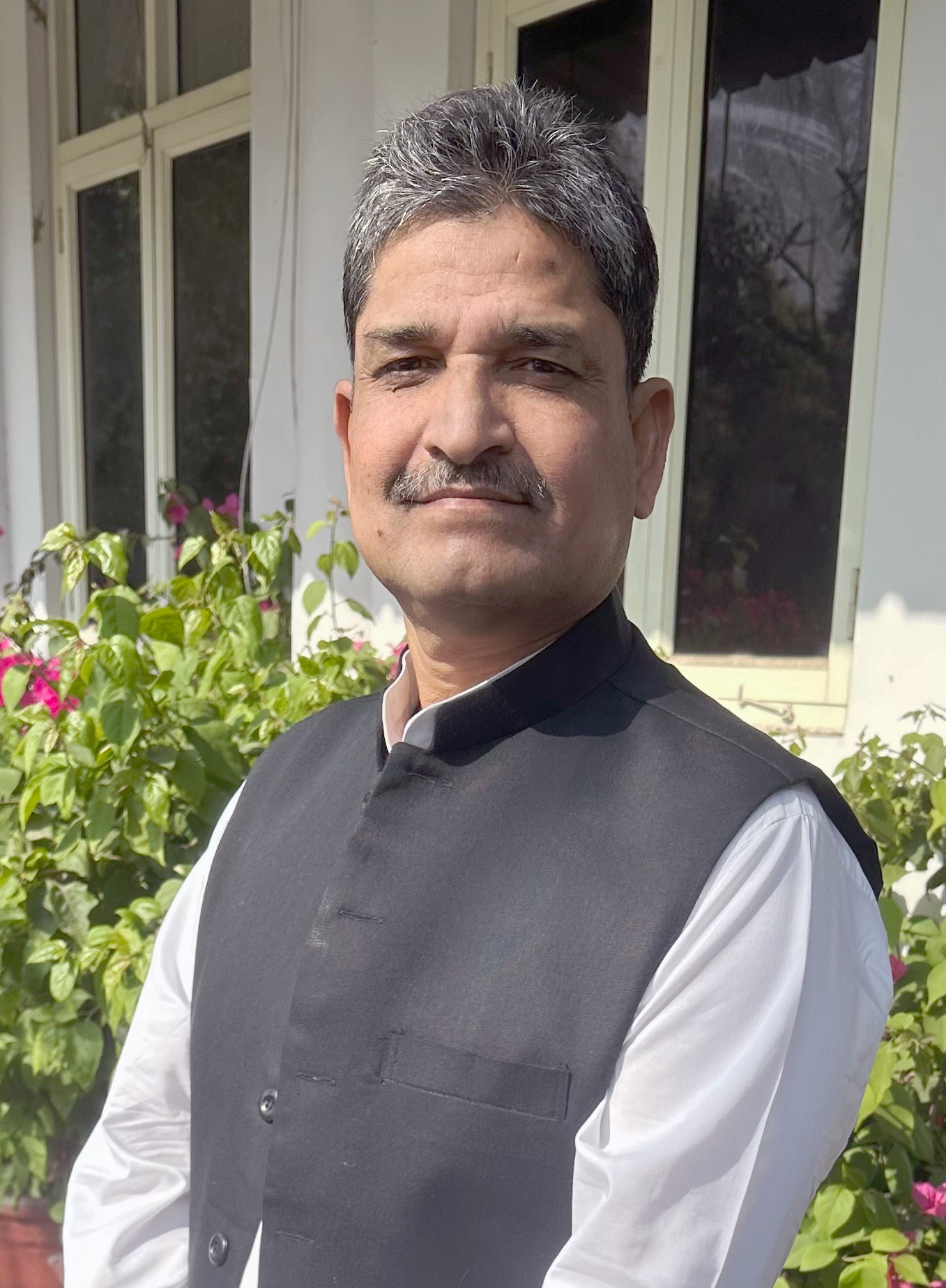
- Incumbent Mohammad Jawed
- Party: INC
- Elected year: 2024

Kishanganj Lok Sabha constituency is one of the 40 Lok Sabha (parliamentary) constituencies in Bihar state in India

Most successful parties from Kishanganj Lok Sabha
1. INC (10 times) (58.8%)
2. RJD (2 times) (11.8%)
3. JD (2 times) (11.8%)
4. PSP (1 time) (5.88%)
5. JP (1 time) (5.88%)
6. BJP (1 time) (5.88%)

== Assembly segments ==
Presently, Kishanganj Lok Sabha constituency comprises the following six Vidhan Sabha (legislative assembly) segments:

#	Name	District	Member	Party	2024 Lead
52	Bahadurganj	Kishanganj	Tauseef Alam	AIMIM	AIMIM
53	Thakurganj	Kishanganj	Gopal Agarwal	JD(U)	JD(U)
54	Kishanganj	Kishanganj	Qamrul Hoda	INC	INC
55	Kochadhaman	Kishanganj	Sarwar Alam	AIMIM	AIMIM
56	Amour	Purnia	Akhtarul Iman	AIMIM	INC
57	Baisi	Purnia	Ghulam Sarwar	AIMIM	INC

== Members of Parliament ==
Following is the list of the Members of Parliament from Kishanganj constituency

Year	Name	Party
1957	Mohammad Tahir	Indian National Congress
1962	Mohammad Tahir	Indian National Congress
1967	Lakhan Lal Kapoor	Praja Socialist Party
1971	Jamilur Rahman	Indian National Congress
1977	Halimuddin Ahmed	Janata Party
1980	Jamilur Rahman	Indian National Congress (I)
1984	Jamilur Rahman	Indian National Congress
1989	M. J. Akbar	Indian National Congress
1991	Syed Shahabuddin	Janata Dal
1996	Mohammed Taslimuddin	Janata Dal
1998	Mohammed Taslimuddin	Rashtriya Janata Dal
1999	Shahnawaz Hussain	Bharatiya Janata Party
2004	Mohammed Taslimuddin	Rashtriya Janata Dal
2009	Asrarul Haq Qasmi	Indian National Congress
2014	Asrarul Haq Qasmi	Indian National Congress
2019	Mohammad Jawed	Indian National Congress
2024	Mohammad Jawed	Indian National Congress

== Election results ==
Vote share of Winning candidates
2024	35.00%
2019	33.32%
2014	53.15%
2009	38.19%
2004	51.70%
1999	35.50%
1998	32.47%
1996	55.74%
1991	44.10%
1989	32.53%
1984	44.19%
1980	54.22%
1977	58.58%
1971	58.53%
1967	42.97%
1962	35.65%
1957	47.94%

=== General Elections 2029 ===
2029 Indian general election: Kishanganj
Party	Candidate	Votes	%	±%
INC				
BJP				
AIMIM				
NOTA	None of the above			
Margin of victory				
Turnout				
		Swing		

=== 2024 ===
2024 Indian general elections: Kishanganj
Party	Candidate	Votes	%	±%
INC	Mohammad Jawed	402,850	35.00	▲1.62
JD(U)	Mujahid Alam	343,158	29.81	▼0.38
AIMIM	Akhtarul Iman	309,264	26.87	▲0.09
NOTA	None of the above	24,966	2.17	▲0.38
Margin of victory		59,692	5.19	▲2.06
Turnout		11,51,296	62.91	▼3.77
INC hold		Swing		

=== 2019 ===
2019 Indian general elections: Kishanganj
Party	Candidate	Votes	%	±%
INC	Mohammad Jawed	367,017	33.32	−19.83
JD(U)	Syed Mahmood Ashraf	3,32,551	30.19	+24.18
AIMIM	Akhtarul Iman	2,95,029	26.78	N/A
NOTA	None of the above	19,722	1.79	−0.06
AAP	Alimuddin Ansari	9,822	0.89	−0.73
AITC	Javed Akhter	5,483	0.5	N/A
Margin of victory		34,461	3.13	−17.83
Turnout		11,01,656	66.38	+1.86
INC hold		Swing		

=== 2014 ===
2014 Indian general elections: Kishanganj
Party	Candidate	Votes	%	±%
INC	Mohammad Asrarul Haque	493,461	53.15	+14.96
BJP	Dr. Dilip Kumar Jaiswal	2,98,849	32.19	+32.19
JD(U)	Akhtarul Iman	55,822	6.01	−19.37
AAP	Alimuddin Ansari	15,010	1.62	+1.62
NOTA	None of the Above	17,206	1.85	
Majority		1,94,612	20.96	
Turnout		9,28,490	64.52	
INC hold		Swing		

=== 2009 ===
2009 Indian general elections: Kishanganj
Party	Candidate	Votes	%	±%
INC	Mohammad Asrarul Haque	239,405	38.19	
JD(U)	Syed Mahmood Ashraf	1,59,136	25.38	
RJD	Mohammed Taslimuddin	1,24,182	19.81	
Majority		80,269	12.81	
Turnout		6,26,6914	52.84	
INC gain from RJD		Swing		

=== 2004 ===
2004 Indian general elections: Kishanganj
Party	Candidate	Votes	%	±%
RJD	Mohammed Taslimuddin	420,331	51.7	
BJP	Syed Shahnawaz Hussain	259,834	31.9	
SP	Abdul Jalil Mastan	77,356	9.5	
Majority		160,497	19.7	
Turnout		8,13,315	63.6	
RJD gain from BJP		Swing		

=== 1999 ===
1999 Indian general elections: Kishanganj
Party	Candidate	Votes	%	±%
BJP	Syed Shahnawaz Hussain	258,035	35.5	
RJD	Mohammed Taslimuddin	249,387	34.3	
NCP	Asrarul Haq Qasmi	197,478	27.1	
Majority		8,648	1.2	
Turnout		7,27,839	64.4	
BJP gain from RJD		Swing		

=== 1998 ===
1998 Indian general election: Kishanganj
Party	Candidate	Votes	%	±%
RJD	Mohammed Taslimuddin	236,744	32.47	
SP	Asrarul Haq Qasmi	230,256	31.58	
BJP	Syed Shahnawaz Hussain	230,210	31.57	
Majority		6,488	0.99	
Turnout		729,132	65.51	
RJD gain from JD		Swing		

=== 1996 ===
1996 Indian general election: Kishanganj
Party	Candidate	Votes	%	±%
JD	Taslimuddin	381,530	55.74	
BJP	Vishwanath Kejriwal	216,947	31.69	
IND	Md. Mustaque Munna	45,571	6.66	
INC	Md. Zahidur Rahman	15,895	2.32	
JP	Syed Shahabuddin	9,095	1.33	
IND	Md Juber Alam	8,882	1.30	
IND	Parveen Kr. Paswan	1,909	0.28	
IND	Satyenderanath Verma	1,458	0.21	
IND	Laxami Rishideo	933	0.14	
IND	Dilip Kumar Ghosh	621	0.09	
IND	Hari Mohan Singh	510	0.07	
BSP	Laxmi Prasad Singh	428	0.06	
IND	Atahar Hussain	317	0.05	
IND	Hari Ram Agarwal	272	0.04	
IND	Azimuddin	125	0.02	
Majority		164,583	24.05	
Turnout		694,288	61.39	
JD hold		Swing		

=== 1991 ===
1991 Indian general election: Kishanganj
Party	Candidate	Votes	%	±%
JD	Syed Shahabuddin	231,703	44.10	
BJP	Vishwanath Kejriwal	152,075	28.95	
INC	M. J. Akbar	80,175	15.26	
IND	Taslim Uddin	42,794	8.15	
IND	Tara Chand	4,987	0.95	
IND	Abadh Das	3,362	0.64	
IND	Vishwakarma Prasad	2,995	0.57	
JP	M. A. Hannan	1,443	0.27	
IND	Shivnath Prasad	1,309	0.25	
IND	Lal Chand Jalan	1,119	0.21	
IND	Farooque Azam	641	0.12	
IND	Santosh Kr. Ghosh	615	0.12	
DDP	Mohan Yadav	590	0.11	
IND	Zahir Uddin	513	0.10	
IND	Gahan Lal Majhi	401	0.08	
IND	Balak Das	368	0.07	
IND	Vankat Lal Agarwal	293	0.06	
Majority		79,628	15.15	
Turnout		534,541	55.47	
Swing to JD from INC		Swing		

=== 1989 ===
1989 Indian general election: Kishanganj
Party	Candidate	Votes	%	±%
INC	M. J. Akbar	178,556	32.53	
IND	Asrarul Haque	152,565	27.80	
JD	Mustaque Munna	139,992	25.51	
JP	Lakhanlal Kapur	55,682	10.15	
IND	Balak Dass	13,758	2.51	
IND	Jamil Akhitar	3,169	0.58	
DDP	Mohan Yadav	2,497	0.45	
IND	Nasimudin	1,802	0.33	
IND	M. A. Hanan	805	0.15	
Majority		25,991	4.73	
Turnout		559,966	58.55	
INC hold		Swing		

=== 1984 ===
1984 Indian general election: Kishanganj
Party	Candidate	Votes	%	±%
INC	Jamilur Rahman	191,754	44.19	
LKD	M. Mushtak	75,624	17.43	
BJP	Tara Chand	75,241	17.34	
JP	Taslim Uddin	72,215	16.64	
IND	Jwala Prasad Gupta	9,941	2.29	
IND	Balak Das	3,926	0.90	
IND	Santosh Kumar Ghosh	1,417	0.33	
IND	Ramadhar Sharma	1,250	0.29	
IND	Ataur Rahman	1,077	0.25	
IND	Devendra Na. Singh	899	0.21	
IND	Nurool Hoda	570	0.13	
Majority		116,130	26.76	
Turnout		444,904	55.75	
INC hold		Swing		

=== 1980 ===
1980 Indian general election: Kishanganj
Party	Candidate	Votes	%	±%
INC(I)	Zamilur Rahman	170,662	54.22	
JP	Halimuddin Ahmad	71,613	22.75	
JP(S)	Khalilur Rahaman	60,039	19.07	
IND	Jogeshwar Dome	4,324	1.37	
IND	Zakir Ali Iraqui	3,481	1.11	
IND	Santosh Kumar Ghosh	1,865	0.59	
IND	Ku. Udai Bhanu Roy	1,719	0.55	
IND	Firoz Hasan	1,071	0.34	
Majority		99,049	31.47	
Turnout		320,666	45.63	
Swing to INC(I) from JP		Swing		

=== 1977 ===
1977 Indian general election: Kishanganj
Party	Candidate	Votes	%	±%
JP	Halimuddin Ahmed	168,175	58.58	
INC	Jamilur Rahman	88,045	30.67	
IND	Shyamdeo Jha	13,802	4.81	
IND	Ali Mogni	9,634	3.36	
IND	Md. Muslim	6,314	2.20	
IUML	Gulam Haider Aulia	1,114	0.39	
Majority		80,130	27.91	
Turnout		292,961	48.91	
Swing to JP from INC		Swing		

=== 1971 ===
1971 Indian general election: Kishanganj
Party	Candidate	Votes	%	±%
INC	Jamilur Rahman	122,619	58.53	
ABJS	Bal Krishna Jha	41,705	19.91	
IND	Lakhan Lal Kapur	20,182	9.63	
IND	Gulam Sarwar	9,596	4.58	
PSP	Nurul Hoda	6,462	3.08	
INC(O)	Md. Ismail	3,610	1.72	
IND	Zakir Ali Iraqui	2,753	1.31	
IND	Shyamdeo Jha	1,727	0.82	
IND	Roshan Jahan	845	0.40	
Majority		80,914	38.62	
Turnout		214,771	41.80	
Swing to INC from PSP		Swing		

=== 1967 ===
1967 Indian general election: Kishanganj
Party	Candidate	Votes	%	±%
PSP	L. L. Kapoor	84,834	42.97	
INC	M. Tahir	50,551	25.61	
IND	M. Ehsan	26,634	13.49	
IND	Zahiruddin	15,765	7.99	
ABJS	S. Sanatan	11,159	5.65	
SWA	S. A. M. Kaji	8,464	4.29	
Majority		34,283	17.36	
Turnout		208,354	44.85	
Swing to PSP from INC		Swing		

=== 1962 ===
1962 Indian general election: Kishanganj
Party	Candidate	Votes	%	±%
INC	Mohammad Tahir	64,522	35.65	
SWA	Bokai Mandal	49,967	27.61	
PSP	Lakhan Lall Kapoor	44,649	24.67	
ABJS	Bishwanath Mishra	13,385	7.40	
IND	Mahboor Rahman	8,440	4.66	
Majority		14,555	8.04	
Turnout		193,111	39.72	
INC hold		Swing		

=== 1957 ===
1957 Indian general election: Kishanganj
Party	Candidate	Votes	%	±%
INC	Mohammad Tahir	68,949	47.94	
IND	Bokai Mandal	37,665	26.19	
PSP	Khalilur Rahman	37,221	25.88	
Majority		31,284	21.75	
Turnout		143,835	37.01	
INC win (new seat)				

== See also ==
- Akhtarul Iman
- Kishanganj district
- List of constituencies of the Lok Sabha
- Asrarul Haq Qasmi
