= Mohammad Hussain Azad =

Indian politician

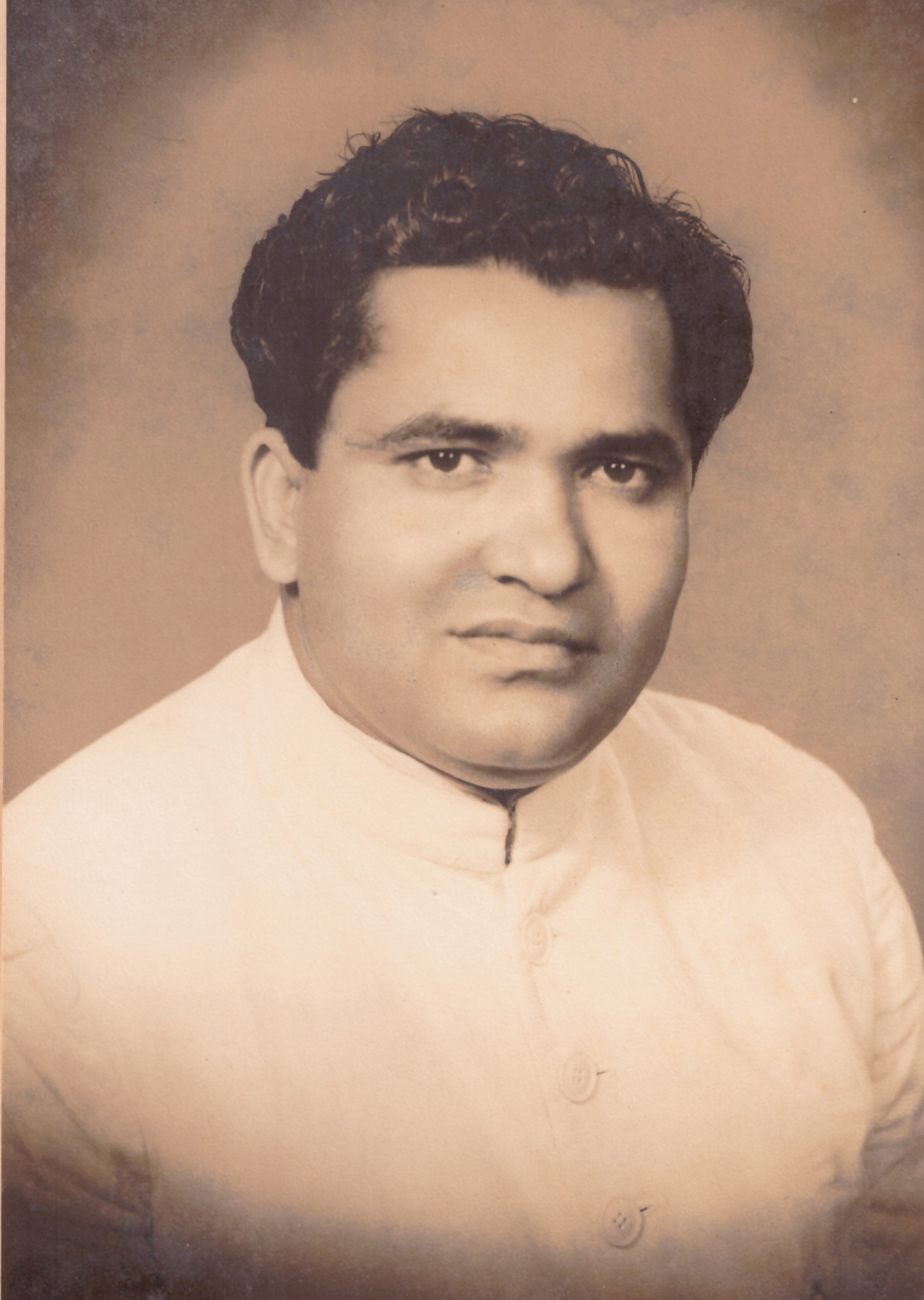

Member of the Bihar Legislative Assembly
- In office 1962–1967
- Preceded by: Abdul Haiyat
- Succeeded by: Yashoda Devi
- Constituency: Kishanganj
- In office 1967–1969
- Constituency: Thakurganj
- In office 1969–1972
- Constituency: Thakurganj
- In office 1972–1976
- Constituency: Thakurganj
- In office 1980–1985
- Constituency: Thakurganj
- In office 1985–1989
- Constituency: Thakurganj

Personal details
- Born: 6 July 1936 Naunadi, Kishanganj district
- Died: 26 May 1991 (aged 54)
- Party: Indian National Congress
- Other political affiliations: Swatantra Party
- Spouse: Sayeeda Bano
- Children: Mohammad Jawed (Son), Zafir Anjum (Son), & Ishrat Akhtar (Daughter)
- Education: Aligarh Muslim University Aligarh UP

Mohammad Hussain Azad (M.H Azad) (6 July 1936 – 26 May 1991) was an Indian politician from the state of Bihar. He was a six-time MLA from 1962 to 1990. He also served multiple times as a cabinet minister in the Bihar state government. The last ministry he headed was Health. He entered politics as a member of the Swatantra Party and then joined the Congress where his political career spanned 25 years.

== Early life and family ==
He was born on July 6, 1936, in GoaBari village in Naunadi, Kishanganj district, Bihar. After receiving his early education at home, he earned an MA and LLB from Aligarh Muslim University. His eldest son Mohammad Jawed is the MP from Kishanganj, Bihar.

His wife Sayeeda Bano runs a foundation in his name 'Azad India Foundation' for the betterment of marginalized communities of Seemanchal, Bihar since 1998.

== Political career ==
He started his political career with the Swatantra Party in 1962. He contested his first election from the Kishanganj assembly seat at the age of 25. Then, he joined the Indian National Congress and won a second term from the Thakurganj assembly seat in 1967.

Following instability in government formation and President's rule, mid-term elections were held in 1969 and he was re-elected MLA from Thakurganj. He won consecutive elections until 1972. Then, Azad lost his first election in 1977, after the Emergency.

In 1980 Bihar assembly election, he again won the election with majority and repeated his victory in 1985 election also.

He served as a cabinet minister in various departments during his career.

#	From	To	Position	Party
1.	Feb 1962	Feb 1967	MLA (1st term) from Kishanganj	SWA
2.	Feb 1967	Feb 1969	MLA (2nd term) from Thakurganj	INC
3.	Feb 1969	March 1972	MLA (3rd term) from Thakurganj	INC
4.	March 1972	June 1976	MLA (4th term) from Thakurganj	INC
5.	May 1980	March 1985	MLA (5th term) from Thakurganj	INC
6.	March 1985	May 1989	MLA (6th term) from Thakurganj	INC
