= Kochadhaman Assembly constituency =

Coordinates: 26°07′55″N 87°50′02″E

Kochadhaman
- Constituency No. 55 for the Bihar Legislative Assembly

Constituency details
- Country: India
- Region: East India
- State: Bihar
- District: Kishanganj
- Established: 2008
- Total electors: 250,697
- Reservation: None

Member of Legislative Assembly
- 18th Bihar Legislative Assembly
- Incumbent Sarwar Alam
- Party: AIMIM
- Alliance: None
- Elected year: 2025

Kochadhaman Assembly constituency is an assembly constituency in Kishanganj district in the Indian state of Bihar.

== Overview ==
As per Delimitation of Parliamentary and Assembly constituencies Order, 2008, No 55 Kochadhamin Assembly constituency is composed of the following: Kochadhamin community development block; Belwa, Gachhpara, Chakla, Mehangaon, Daula and Pichhla gram panchayats of Kishanganj CD Block.

Kochadhaman Assembly constituency is part of No 10 Kishanganj (Lok Sabha constituency).

== Members of the Bihar Legislative Assembly ==
Following is the list of Members of Legislative Assembly from Kochadhaman Vidhan Sabha.

Year	Name	Party
Until 2008: Constituency did not exist
2010	Akhtarul Iman	Rashtriya Janata Dal
2014^	Mujahid Alam	Janata Dal (United)
2015	Mujahid Alam	Janata Dal (United)
2020	Muhammad Izhar Asfi	All India Majlis-e-Ittehadul Muslimeen
2020	Muhammad Izhar Asfi	Rashtriya Janata Dal
2025	Sarwar Alam	All India Majlis-e-Ittehadul Muslimeen

^denotes by-election

== Election results ==
=== 2025 ===
2025 Bihar Legislative Assembly election: Kochadhaman
Party	Candidate	Votes	%	±%
AIMIM	Sarwar Alam	81,860	42.34	▼7.11
RJD	Mujahid Alam	58,839	30.44	▲14.26
BJP	Bina Devi	44,858	23.2	
Independent	Md. Shamsul Haque	2,188	1.13	
JSP	Abu Affan Farooquee	1,976	1.02	
NOTA	None of the above	2,039	1.05	▼0.78
Majority		23,021	11.9	▼10.47
Turnout		193,325	77.12	▲12.53
AIMIM hold		Swing		

=== 2020 ===
2020 Bihar Legislative Assembly election: Kochadhaman
Party	Candidate	Votes	%	±%
AIMIM	Muhammad Izhar Asfi	79,893	49.45	▲23.31
JD(U)	Mujahid Alam	43,750	27.08	▼12.34
RJD	Shahid Alam	26,134	16.18	
Independent	Dayanand Mandal	1,947	1.21	
LJP	Habibur Rahman	1,606	0.99	
NOTA	None of the above	2,953	1.83	▼0.73
Majority		36,143	22.37	▲9.09
Turnout		161,568	64.59	▼0.91
AIMIM gain from JD(U)		Swing		

=== 2015 ===
2015 Bihar Legislative Assembly election: Kochadhaman
Party	Candidate	Votes	%	±%
JD(U)	Mujahid Alam	55,929	39.42	
AIMIM	Akhtarul Iman	37,086	26.14	
BJP	Abdur Rahman	34,895	24.59	
Janta Dal Rashtravadi	Wasi Asgar	2,089	1.47	
JAP(L)	Gulrez Roshan Rahman	1,348	0.95	
NOTA	None of the above	3,636	2.56	
Majority		18,843	13.28	
Turnout		141,890	65.5	
JD(U) gain from JD(U)		Swing		

=== 2014 bypoll ===
Bihar Assembly election, 2014 by-election: Kochadhaman
Party	Candidate	Votes	%	±%
JD(U)	Mujahid Alam	41,288	32.65	
INC	Sadique Samdani	31,050	24.55	
BJP	Abdur Rahman	28,924	22.87	
RJD	Muhammad Intekhab Alam	22,818	18.04	
Majority				
Turnout				
JD(U) gain from RJD		Swing		

=== 2010 ===
Bihar Assembly election, 2010: Kochadhaman
Party	Candidate	Votes	%	±%
RJD	Akhtarul Iman	37,376	36.27	
JD(U)	Mujahid Alam	28,351	27.52	
INC	Sadique Samdani	9,861	9.57	
Majority		9,025	8.75	
Turnout				
