= Mujahid Alam =

Indian politician (born 1969)

Member of the Bihar Legislative Assembly
- In office May 2014 – 10 November 2020
- Preceded by: Akhtarul Iman
- Succeeded by: Muhammad Izhar Asfi
- Constituency: Kochadhaman

Personal details
- Born: 27 December 1969 (age 56) Kairi Birpur, Kishanganj, Bihar
- Party: Rashtriya Janata Dal Janta Dal United
- Spouse: Gulchaman Roshan Ara
- Children: Three Daughters
- Education: Patna College, (B.A.) Hons.

Mujahid Alam (born 27 December 1969) is an Indian politician. He was the member of Bihar Legislative Assembly May 2014 to November 2020 and represented Kochadhaman Vidhan Sabha constituency.

== Early life and education ==
Alam was born in village Kairi Birpur in Kishanganj, Bihar and completed his Bachelor of Arts (Honours) at Patna College in 1990.

== Personal life ==
His father's name is Jamilur Rahman. Mujahid Alam is married to Gulchaman Roshan Ara. He has three daughters.

== Political career ==
He entered politics in the year 2010. He was elected as a member of the Bihar Legislative Assembly in May 2014 Kochadhaman assembly by-election as JD(U) candidate. And again retained his seat in 2015 Bihar Vidhan Sabha election by defeating Akhtarul Iman of AIMIM. He was unable to hold his position in 2020 assembly election and lost to Izhar Asfi of AIMIM by a margin of more than 40000 votes. He is set to contest the 2024 Parliamentary Elections as Janata Dal(United) candidate from the Kishanganj Lok Sabha seat.
