= Asrarul Haq Qasmi =

Indian politician

- Constituency: Kishanganj

Member of the India Parliament for Kishanganj
- In office 2009 – 7 December 2018
- Preceded by: Tasleem Uddin
- Succeeded by: Mohammad Jawed

8th General Secretary of Jamiat Ulama-e-Hind
- In office 29 January 1980 – 11 October 1991
- Preceded by: Syed Ahmad Hashmi
- Succeeded by: Mufti Abdul Razzaq

Personal life
- Born: 15 February 1942 Tarabari, Kishanganj
- Died: 7 December 2018 (aged 76)
- Children: 5 Including Saud Alam MLA
- Political party: Indian National Congress
- Education: Darul Uloom Deoband

Religious life
- Religion: Islam

Mohammad Asrarul Haque (commonly known as Asrarul Haq Qasmi ; 15 February 1942 – 7 December 2018) was an Indian Muslim scholar and politician, who served as the eighth general secretary of the Jamiat Ulama-e-Hind. He was a member of the Indian Parliament, and represented Kishanganj seat. He was also the state president of Jamiat Ulema-e-Hind.

== Biography ==
Haq was born on 15 February 1942. He was an alumnus of the Darul Uloom Deoband.

Haq won from the Kishanganj seat in the 2009 Indian general election by contesting on an Indian National Congress ticket. In the 2014 general election, he contested against Bharatiya Janata Party candidate Dilip Jaiswal. He retained his seat in the election, polling the highest number of votes in the state.

Haq helped found the center of the Aligarh Muslim University in Kishanganj. Two Circles, in a report, blamed him for not taking steps for the improvement of government colleges in the area, saying that "the condition of government colleges was disappointing." He was a member of the All India Muslim Personal Law Board and the president of All India Milli Council. Following Syed Ahmad Hashmi, Haq served as the general secretary of the Jamiat Ulama-e-Hind from 1981 to 1990.

Haq addressed a gathering of students and teachers at Darul Uloom Suffah on 6 December 2018. He was pronounced dead at around 3:30 AM, 7 December 2018. The cause of death was a heart attack.

== Views ==
Haq felt that Indians will "strongly resist" any attempt of the government to drop the Article 370 which bestows a special status on the state of Jammu and Kashmir. Citing the fact that the Bharatiya Janata Party had secured 31% of the votes in the 2014 general election, Haq claimed the party had no right to modify the Constitution. He criticized the BJP that the party had failed to abide by the promises they made about employment. He also criticized the idea of cashless economy.

Haq said that there is an "international Zionist conspiracy" which asserts that Islam promotes terrorism. He criticized the Boko Haram and said the organization was a part of the conspiracy.

== Personal life ==
Haq married Salma Khatoon on 16 May 1965. She died on 9 July 2012. He had two sons and three daughters.

== Election contested ==
=== 1989 loksaba elections ===
1989 Indian general elections: Kishanganj
Party	Candidate	Votes	%	±%
	Mohammad Asrarul Haque	1,52,565	27.8	NEW

=== 1998 loksaba elections ===
1998 Indian general elections: Kishanganj
Party	Candidate	Votes	%	±%
	Mohammad Asrarul Haque	2,30,256	31.58	▲3.8

=== 1999 loksaba elections ===
1999 Indian general elections: Kishanganj
Party	Candidate	Votes	%	±%
	Mohammad Asrarul Haque	1,97,478	27.52	▼4

=== 2009 loksaba elections ===
2009 Indian general elections: Kishanganj
Party	Candidate	Votes	%	±%
	Mohammad Asrarul Haque	2,39,405	20.18	▼7

=== 2014 loksaba elections ===
2014 Indian general elections: Kishanganj
Party	Candidate	Votes	%	±%
	Mohammad Asrarul Haque	4,93,461	34.29	▲14.2

== See also ==
- List of Deobandis

Lok Sabha
Preceded by Mohammed Taslimuddin	Member of Parliament for Kishanganj; 2009 – 2018	Succeeded by Vacant
