= Thakurganj =

- Town
- Location in Bihar, India
- Coordinates: 26.45°N 88.13°E
- Country: India
- State: Bihar
- District: Kishanganj
- Elevation: 82 m (269 ft)

Population (2011)
  - Total: 18,348

Languages
  - Official: Hindi
- Time zone: UTC+5:30 (IST)
- Postal code: 855116
- Vehicle registration: BR - 37
- Lok Sabha constituency: Kishanganj
- Vidhan Sabha constituency: Thakurganj

Thakurganj is a town and a notified area, divided into 12 wards, in Kishanganj district in the Indian state of Bihar.

== Geography ==
It has an average elevation of 82 metres (269 feet). It touches international border of Nepal in one side and of West Bengal on other side.

== Demographics ==
As of India 2011 census, Thakurganj had a population of 18,348. Males constitute 52.5% of the population and females 47.5%. In Thakurganj Nagar Panchayat, the female sex ratio is 905 against state average of 918. Moreover, the child sex ratio in Thakurganj is around 937 compared to Bihar state average of 935. Thakurganj has an average literacy rate of 76.09%, higher than the state average of 61.80%: male literacy is 81.76%, and female literacy is 69.79%. In Thakurganj, 10.54% of the population is under 6 years of age.

Religions in Thakurganj Town
Religion	Percent
Hindus	78.75%
Muslims	18.84%
Others	2.41%

Religions in Thakurganj Tehsil
Religion	Percent
Muslims	64.05%
Hindus	35.18%
Others	0.30%
