= Naushad Alam =

Indian politician

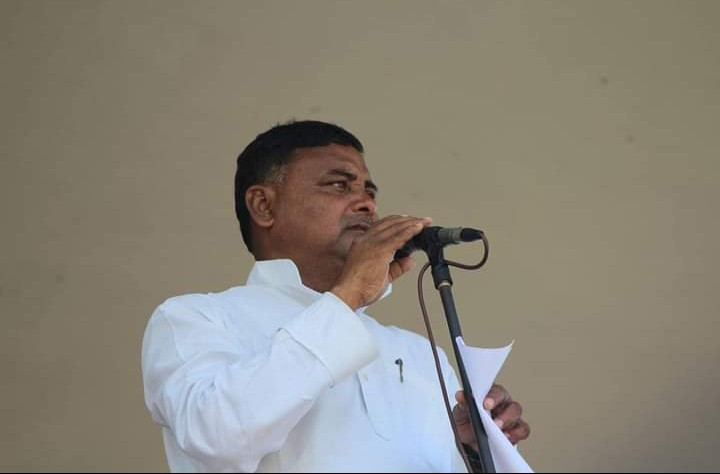

MLA of Thakurganj
- In office 2010–2020
- Preceded by: Gopal Kumar Agarwal
- Succeeded by: Saud Alam Nadwi

Personal details
- Born: Duraghati [Thakurganj]
- Party: Janata Dal (United)
- Spouse: Nusrat Fatma
- Children: 4

Naushad Alam is an Indian politician belonging to Janata Dal (United). He was elected as a member of Bihar Legislative Assembly from Thakurganj in 2010 and 2015. He has served as a Zila Prishad member from 2000 to 2005 of Kishanganj.

He Is currently serving as Deputy Chairman Bihar State Minority Commission Government of Bihar since August 2023.

He served as the Ministry of Minority Welfare Department in Bihar and also served as JDU WHIP in Bihar Vidhan sabha.
