= Kochadhaman =

Kochadhaman कोचाधामन
- Location in Bihar
- Coordinates: 26.104°N 87.954°E
- Country: India
- State: Bihar
- District: Kishanganj

Population (2011)
  - Total: 5,623

Language
  - Official: Hindi

Kochadhaman is One Of the Block in 7 Blocks Of Kishanganj district of Bihar state of India Kochadhaman also one of Legislative Assembly Seat .

== See also ==
- Kishanganj district
