= Mohammad Jawed =

Indian politician (born 1963)

Mohammad Jawed MP
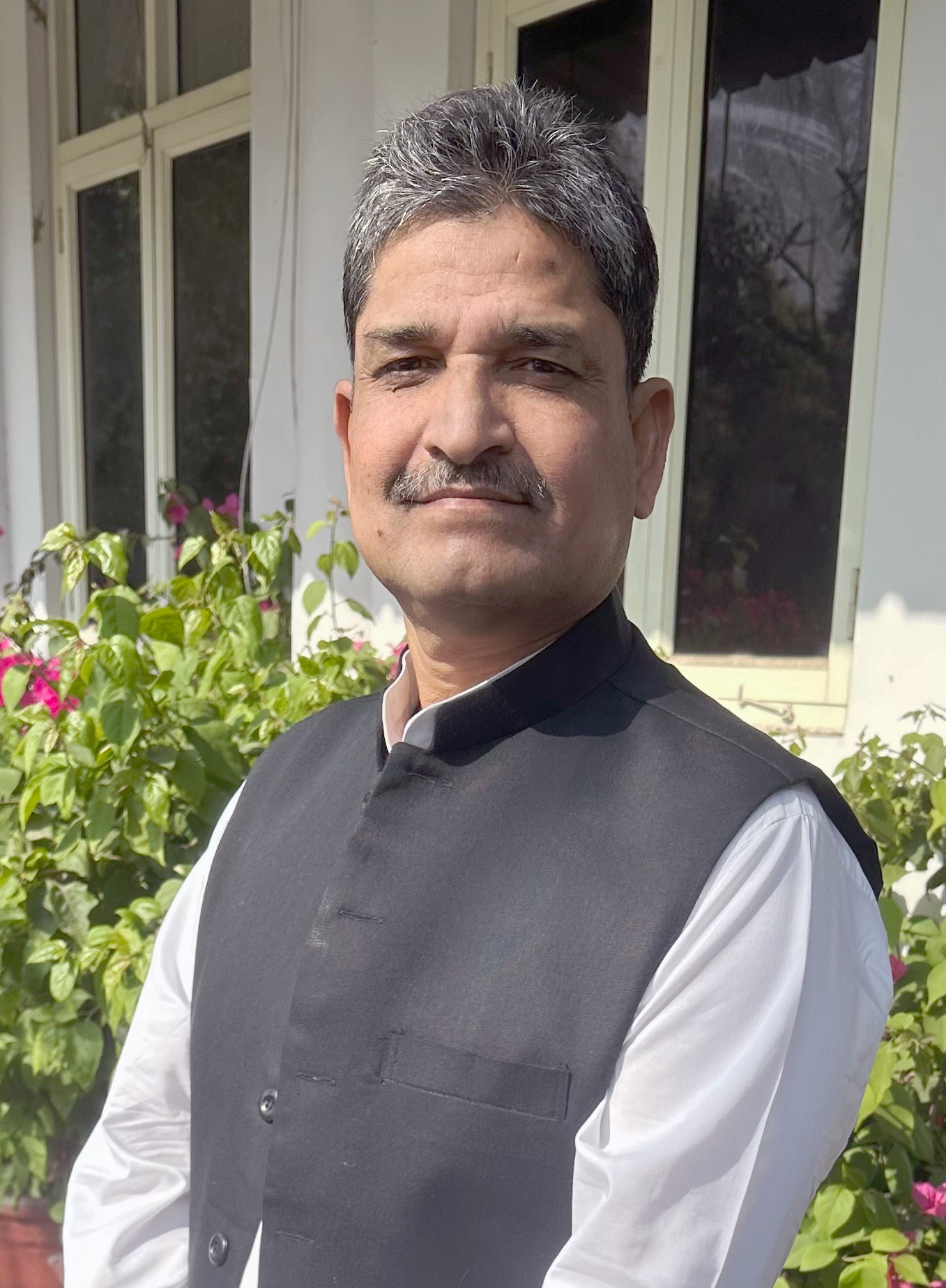

Member of Parliament, Lok Sabha
- Incumbent
- Assumed office 23 May 2019
- Preceded by: Mohammad Asrarul Haque
- Constituency: Kishanganj

Member of the Bihar Legislative Assembly
- In office 2010–2019
- Preceded by: Akhtarul Iman
- Succeeded by: Qamrul Hoda
- Constituency: Kishanganj
- In office 2000–2005
- Preceded by: Sikander Singh
- Succeeded by: Gopal Kumar Agarwal
- Constituency: Thakurganj

Personal details
- Born: 17 June 1963 (age 63) Kishanganj, Bihar, India
- Party: Indian National Congress
- Spouse: Yuman Husain
- Children: 2 sons
- Education: University of Kashmir (MBBS)
- As of April, 2019 Source: [vidhansabha.bih.nic.in/Knowyourmla.html]

Mohammad Jawed (born 17 June 1963) is an Indian politician, doctor and Member of Parliament, Lok Sabha. He has been elected to the Lok Sabha two times from Kishanganj constituency in the 2019 Indian general election and 2024 Indian general election as member of the Indian National Congress. He is a Whip of Congress Party in Lok Sabha.

Before entering the Lok Sabha, he had been a four-time MLA. He is also a MBBS doctor and worked as a physician before he entered the politics.

== Early life ==
Jawed was born into a political family on 17 June 1963 in Gowabadi village, Kishanganj district, Bihar. His father Mohammad Hussain Azad was a congress man and served 6 times as MLA from different Vidhan Sabha constituency in Bihar.

Jawed did his tenth grade (1979) and intermediate (1981) from The Air Force School (TAFS) in New Delhi. He has done MBBS from Govt. Medical College, Kashmir university in 1989. He worked as a physician in his area for many years Later he moved into politics.

== Personal life ==
Mohammad Jawed is married to Yuman Hussain, a social worker, running a society Azad India Foundation. He has two sons.

== Political career ==
In 1989, he entered politics. As an Indian National Congress candidate in 2000 Bihar Legislative Assembly election he won from Kishanganj Vidhan Sabha constituency. He was re-elected in Feb. 2005, 2010 & 2015 three terms for Bihar Legislative Assembly from Kishanganj Vidhan Sabha constituency.

He resigned from his MLA post and contested the election for the Member of Parliament from the Congress Party in the 2019 General Election. Then, he was the only candidate of mahagathbandhan (grand alliance) who won any seats in Bihar state.

Apart from this he's currently the Secretary of AICC. He served as the Law, Animal husbandry and Fisheries minister, Chief whip during his tenure as a MLA. He's also a former working president of Bihar Pradesh Congress Committee.
