= Mohammad Tahir (politician) =

Indian politician

Member of Parliament, Lok Sabha
- In office 1971–1977
- President: Varahagiri Venkata Giri; Fakhruddin Ali Ahmed; Basappa Danappa Jatti
- Prime minister: Indira Gandhi
- Constituency: Purnia
- In office 1962–1967
- President: Sarvepalli Radhakrishnan; Zakir Husain
- Prime minister: Jawaharlal Nehru; Gulzarilal Nanda; Lal Bahadur Shastri; Indira Gandhi
- Constituency: Kishanganj
- In office 1957–1962
- President: Rajendra Prasad; Sarvepalli Radhakrishnan
- Prime minister: Jawaharlal Nehru
- Constituency: Kishanganj

Member of Constituent Assembly of India
- In office 1946–1950
- Constituency: Bihar

Member of Bihar Legislative Assembly
- In office 1952–1957
- Constituency: 202 Amour

Member of Bihar Legislative Assembly
- In office 1946–unknown
- Constituency: Purnia
- In office 1937–unknown
- Constituency: Purnia

Personal details
- Born: 1903 Bengal Province, British India
- Party: Indian National Congress
- Spouse: Bibi Zahida Khatoon (m. 1922, died) Khadija Khatoon (after 1941)
- Children: 9
- Parent: Mohammad Taha (father)
- Education: B.A. LL.B.
- Alma mater: Muhammedan Anglo Oriental Collegiate School; Aligarh Muslim University
- Occupation: Politician, Lawyer
- Source

Mohammad Tahir was an Indian politician and lawyer who served as a member of parliament three times in 1957, 1962, 1971, member of Constituent Assembly from 1946 to 50 and member of Bihar Legislative Assembly while representing Kishanganj and Purnia Lok Sabha constituency and Purnia assembly constituency. A member of the Indian National Congress, he also served member of Constituent Assembly from 1946 to 50 and was formerly associated with the All-India Muslim League.

== Biography ==
He was born to Mohammad Taha in 1903 in Bengal Province, British India (in present-day Bihar, India). He grew up in Purnia district. He did his early schooling at Zila School in Purnia and obtained his Bachelor of Arts from the Muhammedan Anglo Oriental Collegiate School in Aligarh. He later attended Aligarh Muslim University where he obtained his law degree such as LL.B.

He was married to Bibi Zahida Khatoon in 1922. After she died, he married again to Khadija Khatoon in 1941. He had nine children, including seven sons and two daughters.

=== Political career ===
Before entering in politics, he was associated with the Muslim league, a political party which was established in British India. In 1930, he was elected as a member of District Board of Purnia and vice-chairman of Sadar Local Board from 1933 to 39 and its chairman until 1941. He was later appointed as a vice-chairman of Purnia District Board from 1941 to 45.

He started his political career around 1937 when he was elected as the member of Bihar Legislative Assembly in 1937, 1946 and 1952. He was also elected a parliament member to the second (1957—62), third (1962—67) and fifth Lok Sabha collectively from 1957 to 1977.
