= Main Media =

Digital News platform in Bihar, India

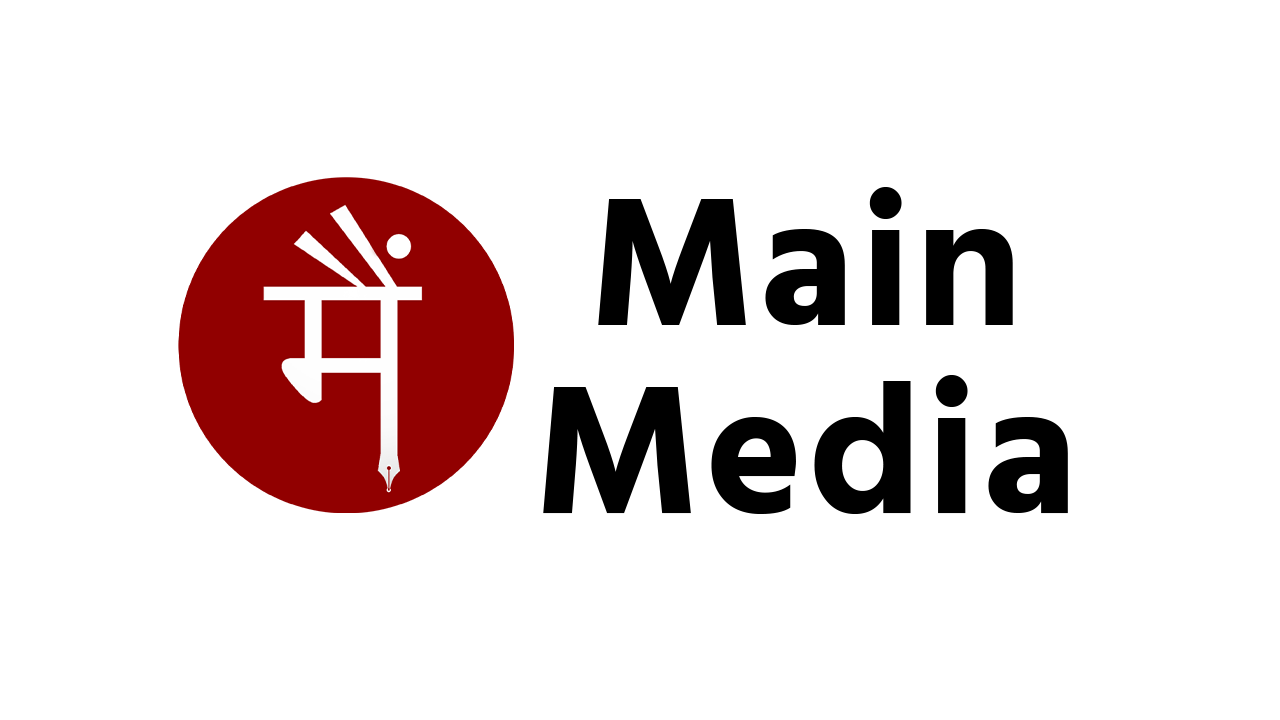
- Website type: News media
- Available in: Hindi
- Country of origin: India
- Founder: Tanzil Asif
- Editor: Umesh Kumar Ray
- Website: mainmedia.in
- Launched: 18 February 2018

Main Media is a hyper-local news platform based in the Seemanchal region, an area located at the border of Bihar and West Bengal. Main Media was founded by Tanzil Asif, an alumnus of the Indian Institute of Mass Communication, Delhi in 2018. With the tagline "Patna se door waala Bihar, Kolkata se door waala Bengal (The Bihar far away from Patna", The Bengal far away from Kolkata), the organisation aims to bring the focus of the media to the historically neglected Seemanchal region of Bihar and West Bengal. Main Media was formally launched on 18 February 2018.

== History ==
Tanzil Asif resigned from his day job in ANI to report about rural India often ignored by mainstream media. After resigning from his post, he shifted to his home district, Kishanganj, one of the most backward districts of India. He wanted to report local issues untouched by mainstream media.

He started as a video journalist covering four districts of Seemanchal viz. Katihar, Purnia, Kishanganj and Araria in 2018. He started solo with minimum resources. Main Media first covered the Araria Lok Sabha By-poll in 2018 vacated by the sudden demise of veteran leader Taslimuddin. Since then Main Media has not looked back and progressed further by fighting challenges. Main Media has expanded its coverage to two districts of North West-Bengal viz. Darjeeling and Uttar Dinajpur districts.

== Content ==
Main Media covers ground reports, elections, political interviews, success stories, daily news. Main Media's Seemanchal Bulletin is a daily news bulletin covering local news of Seemanchal.

== Recognitions ==
Main Media's work has been appreciated by Al Jazeera, BBC, The Logical Indian, Firstpost, Exchange4Media and News18. Its story has been featured in Josh Talks as well.
