= Thakurganj Assembly constituency =

Coordinates: 26°24′42″N 88°06′13″E

Thakurganj
- Constituency No. 53 for the Bihar Legislative Assembly

Constituency details
- Country: India
- Region: East India
- State: Bihar
- Division: Purnia
- District: Kishanganj
- Lok Sabha constituency: Kishanganj
- Established: 1951
- Total electors: 301,120
- Reservation: None

Member of Legislative Assembly
- 18th Bihar Legislative Assembly
- Incumbent Gopal Kumar Agarwal
- Party: JD(U)
- Alliance: NDA
- Elected year: 2025

Thakurganj Assembly constituency is an assembly constituency in Kishanganj district in the Indian state of Bihar.

== Overview ==
As per Delimitation of Parliamentary and Assembly constituencies Order, 2008, No 53 Thakurganj Assembly constituency is composed of the following: Thakurganj community development block; Chhaital,Singhimari, Lohagarha, Satkauwa, Dighalbank, Dhantola, Karuamani, Mangra, Jagir Padampur, Tarabari Padampur, Ikra, Dahibhat, Atgachhia and Tulshia gram panchayats of Dighalbank CD Block.

Thakururganj Assembly constituency is part of No 10 Kishanganj Lok Sabha constituency.

== Members of Legislative Assembly ==
Following is the list of Members of Legislative Assembly from Thakurganj Assembly constituency.

Year	Name	Party
1952	Anant Kant Basu	Indian National Congress
1967	Mohammed Hussain Azad	Indian National Congress
1969	Mohammed Hussain Azad	Indian National Congress
1972	Mohammed Hussain Azad	Indian National Congress
1977	Mohamad Sulemam	Janata Party
1980	Mohammed Hussain Azad	Indian National Congress (I)
1985	Mohammed Hussain Azad	Indian National Congress
1990	Mohamad Sulemam	Janata Dal
1995	Sikander Singh	Bharatiya Janata Party
2000	Mohammad Jawed	Indian National Congress
2005	Mohammad Jawed	Indian National Congress
2005	Gopal Kumar Agarwal	Samajwadi Party
2010	Naushad Alam	Lok Janshakti Party
2015	Naushad Alam	Janata Dal (United)
2020	Saud Alam	Rashtriya Janata Dal
2025	Gopal Kumar Agarwal	Janata Dal (United)

== Election results ==
=== 2025 ===
2025 Bihar Legislative Assembly election: Thakurganj
Party	Candidate	Votes	%	±%
JD(U)	Gopal Kumar Agarwal	85,243	34.71	▲23.25
AIMIM	Ghulam Hasnain	76,421	31.12	▲21.3
RJD	Saud Alam	60,036	24.45	▼17.03
JSP	Mohammad Ekramul Haque	6,806	2.77	
Independent	Basudev Singh	3,814	1.55	
Independent	Sujeet Kumar Purvey	2,544	1.04	
Independent	Mohammad Muktar	2,246	0.91	
NOTA	None of the above	3,609	1.47	▼0.07
Majority		8,822	3.59	▼8.81
Turnout		245,567	81.55	▲15.41
JD(U) gain from RJD		Swing		

=== 2020 ===
Bihar Assembly election, 2020: Thakurganj
Party	Candidate	Votes	%	±%
RJD	Saud Alam	79,909	41.48	
Independent	Gopal Kumar Agarwal	56,022	29.08	
JD(U)	Naushad Alam	22,082	11.46	−29.77
AIMIM	Mahbub Alam	18,925	9.82	
Independent	Shakir Alam	2,701	1.4	
LJP	Md. Kalimuddin	2,490	1.29	−35.45
JAP(L)	Devbret Kumar Ganesh	2,479	1.29	+0.42
Rashtriya Secular Majlis Party	Shahanavaj	1,919	1.0	
NOTA	None of the above	2,976	1.54	−0.71
Majority		23,887	12.4	+7.91
Turnout		192,628	66.14	−3.86
RJD gain from JD(U)		Swing		

=== 2015 ===
2015 Bihar Legislative Assembly election: Thakurganj
Party	Candidate	Votes	%	±%
JD(U)	Naushad Alam (Tatpauwa)	74,239	41.23	
LJP	Gopal Kumar Agrawal	66,152	36.74	
SP	Faiyaz Alam	12,136	6.74	
JMM	Ahmad Hussain	11,176	6.21	
Independent	Chitranjan Singh	3,693	2.05	
Independent	Mustak Alam	3,137	1.74	
NOTA	None of the above	4,058	2.25	
Majority		8,087	4.49	
Turnout		180,049	70.0	
