= Banmankhi Assembly constituency =

Coordinates: 25°52′43″N 87°11′43″E

- Constituency No. - for the Bihar Legislative Assembly

Constituency details
- Country: India
- Region: East India
- State: Bihar
- Established: 1962
- Total electors: 302,101
- Reservation: SC

Member of Legislative Assembly
- 18th Bihar Legislative Assembly
- Incumbent Krishna Kumar Rishi
- Party: BJP
- Alliance: NDA
- Elected year: 2025

Banmankhi is an assembly constituency in Purnia district in the Indian state of Bihar. It is reserved for scheduled castes.

== Overview ==
As per Delimitation of Parliamentary and Assembly constituencies Order, 2008, No. 59 Banmankhi Assembly constituency (SC) is composed of the following: Banmankhi community development block; Aurahi, Barhara Kothi, Dibara Dhani, Gouripur, Latraha, Mulkiya, Nipania, Rustampur, Sukhsena East, Sukhsena West and Matihani gram panchayats of Barhara Kothi CD Block.

Banmankhi Assembly constituency is part of No 12 Purnia (Lok Sabha constituency).

== Members of the Legislative Assembly ==
Year	Name	Party
1962	Bhola Paswan Shastri	Indian National Congress
1967	Baldeo Saraf	Indian National Congress
1969	Rasiklal Rishideo	Indian National Congress
1972	Rasiklal Rishideo	Indian National Congress
1977	Balbodh Paswan	Janata Party
1980	Jaikant Paswan	Indian National Congress (U)
1985	Rasiklal Rishideo	Indian National Congress
1990	Chunnilal Rajbanshi	Bharatiya Janata Party
1995	Chunnilal Rajbanshi	Janata Dal
2000	Deo Narayan Rajak	Bharatiya Janata Party
2005	Krishna Kumar Rishi	Bharatiya Janata Party
2005	Krishna Kumar Rishi	Bharatiya Janata Party
2010	Krishna Kumar Rishi	Bharatiya Janata Party
2015	Krishna Kumar Rishi	Bharatiya Janata Party
2020	Krishna Kumar Rishi	Bharatiya Janata Party
2025	Krishna Kumar Rishi	Bharatiya Janata Party

== Election results ==
=== 2025 ===
2025 Bihar Legislative Assembly election: Banmankhi
Party	Candidate	Votes	%	±%
BJP	Krishna Kumar Rishi	122,494	57.26	+5.52
INC	Deo Narayan Rajak	77,198	36.09	
JSP	Manoj Kumar Rishi	6,676	3.12	
BSP	Subodh Paswan	2,128	0.99	
NOTA	None of the above	4,255	1.99	−0.99
Majority		45,296	21.17	+5.84
Turnout		213,932	70.81	+12.0
BJP hold		Swing	NDA	

=== 2020 ===
2020 Bihar Legislative Assembly election: Banmankhi
Party	Candidate	Votes	%	±%
BJP	Krishna Kumar Rishi	93,594	51.74	▲15.92
RJD	Upendra Sharma	65,851	36.41	▲1.02
Independent	Shyam Deo Paswan	3,845	2.13	
JAP(L)	Sanjiv Kumar Paswan	3,600	1.99	▼1.53
Independent	Chandan Bharti	2,135	1.18	
Janta Dal Rashtravadi	Umesh Rishi	2,033	1.12	
NOTA	None of the above	5,384	2.98	▲1.85
Majority		27,743	15.33	▲14.9
Turnout		180,879	58.81	▲0.57
BJP hold		Swing		

=== 2015 ===
2015 Bihar Legislative Assembly election: Banmankhi
Party	Candidate	Votes	%	±%
BJP	Krishna Kumar Rishi	59,053	35.82	
RJD	Sanjiv Kumar Paswan	58,345	35.39	
Independent	Jai Kishor Paswan	7,458	4.52	
JAP(L)	Hari Lal Das	5,803	3.52	
JMM	Umesh Paswan	5,672	3.44	
Independent	Dev Narayan Rajak	5,507	3.34	
CPI	Raj Kumar Raj	3,745	2.27	
Independent	Ashok Kumar Bharti	3,387	2.05	
The National Road Map Party of India	Savita Devi	2,857	1.73	
BSP	Satayanrayan Ram	1,933	1.17	
NCP	Ramdeo Rishideo	1,749	1.06	
Garib Janta Dal (Secular)	Shashi Kala Devi	1,677	1.02	
Maanavvaadi Janta Party	Satyanarayan Prasad Bharti	1,517	0.92	
NOTA	None of the above	1,859	1.13	
Majority		708	0.43	
Turnout		164,850	58.24	
