= Muhammad Izhar Asfi =

Indian politician

Bihar Legislative Assembly
- In office 10 November 2020 – 2025
- Preceded by: Mujahid Alam
- Constituency: Kochadhaman

Personal details
- Party: Rashtriya Janata Dal (2022–Present)
- Other political affiliations: All India Majlis-e-Ittehadul Muslimeen (till 2022)
- Occupation: Politics

Muhammad Izhar Asfi is an Indian politician from Bihar and a Member of the Bihar Legislative Assembly. Izhar Asfi won the Kochadhaman Assembly constituency on AIMIM ticket in the 2020 Bihar Legislative Assembly election. He along with other three AIMIM MLAs joined Rashtriya Janata Dal in June 2022. He had served much longer as Mukhiya of Kathamatha Panchayat in Kishanganj. He is father in law of former Bahadurganj MLA Md. Tauseef Alam.

Izhar Asfi, joined RJD by deserting AIMIM in June 2022. He blamed Bihar State AIMIM president Akhtarul Iman for leaving the AIMIM. Mr. Asfi also claimed in an interview with Seemanchal based news website Main Media that he had worked very hard in Kochadhaman after 2019 Lok Sabha defeat of Akhtarul Iman and used crores of rupees from his pocket for local work.
