= Akhtarul Iman =

Indian politician from Bihar

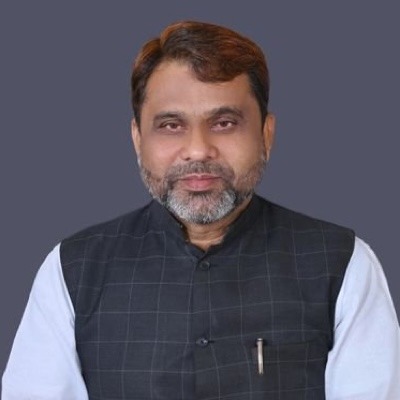

Member of the Bihar Legislative Assembly
- Incumbent
- Assumed office 2020
- Preceded by: Abdul Jalil Mastan
- Constituency: Amour

Member of the Bihar Legislative Assembly
- In office 2010–2014
- Preceded by: Constituency created
- Succeeded by: Mujahid Alam
- Constituency: Kochadhaman

Member of the Bihar Legislative Assembly
- In office February 2005 – 2010
- Preceded by: Ravindra Yadav
- Succeeded by: Mohammad Jawed
- Constituency: Kishanganj

State President of AIMIM, Bihar
- Incumbent
- Assumed office 2015

Personal details
- Born: 7 March 1964 (age 62)
- Party: All India Majlis-e-Ittehadul Muslimeen (2015–present)
- Other political affiliations: Janata Dal (United) (2014–2015); Rashtriya Janata Dal (2005–2014)
- Parent: Abdul Rashid (father)
- Education: Magadh University
- Occupation: Politician

Akhtarul Iman (born 7 March 1964) is an Indian politician from Bihar. He is a member of the Bihar Legislative Assembly representing the Amour constituency. He also serves as the Bihar state president of the All India Majlis-e-Ittehadul Muslimeen (AIMIM).

== Political career ==
=== Early political career ===
Iman entered politics during his student years. In 1985, he joined a campaign led by Moulana Mohammad Hai against burglars and dacoits in the region.

In the 2005 Bihar Legislative Assembly election, he contested from Kishanganj as a candidate of the Rashtriya Janata Dal (RJD) and won. He retained the seat in the October 2005 election and served as MLA until 2010.

In 2010, he was elected from Kochadhaman. During his tenure, he criticised the inclusion of Surya Namaskar in schools, alleging that the state government was promoting the ideology of the Rashtriya Swayamsevak Sangh.

=== AIMIM ===
In 2014, Iman left the RJD and joined the Janata Dal (United). He contested the 2014 Indian general election from the Kishanganj parliamentary constituency but lost to Asrarul Haq Qasmi.

In August 2015, he joined the All India Majlis-e-Ittehadul Muslimeen (AIMIM). He contested the 2015 Bihar Legislative Assembly election from Kochadhaman but lost to Mujahid Alam of the Janata Dal (United).

Iman contested the 2019 Indian general election from the Kishanganj constituency as an AIMIM candidate but was defeated by Mohammad Jawed.

He was elected from Amour in the 2020 Bihar Legislative Assembly election and was re-elected in the 2025 Bihar Legislative Assembly election.

== Positions held ==
Akhtarul Iman has served multiple terms as a member of the Bihar Legislative Assembly.

No.	From	To	Position	Party
1	February 2005	October 2005	MLA from Kishanganj	Rashtriya Janata Dal
2	October 2005	2010	MLA from Kishanganj	Rashtriya Janata Dal
3	2010	2014	MLA from Kochadhaman	Rashtriya Janata Dal
4	2020	2025	MLA from Amour	All India Majlis-e-Ittehadul Muslimeen
5	2025	Present	MLA from Amour	All India Majlis-e-Ittehadul Muslimeen
