= Wazirganj Assembly constituency =

Assembly constituency in Bihar, India

Coordinates: 28.21°N 79.06°E

Wazirganj
- Constituency No. 234 for the Bihar Legislative Assembly

Constituency details
- Country: India
- Region: East India
- State: Bihar
- District: Gaya
- Lok Sabha constituency: Gaya
- Established: 2008
- Reservation: None

Member of Legislative Assembly
- 18th Bihar Legislative Assembly
- Incumbent Birendra Singh
- Party: BJP
- Alliance: NDA
- Elected year: 2025

Wazirganj is an assembly constituency Bihar Legislative Assembly in Bihar, India. It comes under Gaya Lok Sabha constituency. It comprises Wazirganj (community development block), Manpur (community development block) and wards 32 to 37 in Gaya Municipal Corporation, all in Gaya district.

== Members of the Legislative Assembly ==
Year	Member	Party
1951-2008: Constituency did not exist
2010	Birendra Singh	Bharatiya Janata Party
2015	Awadhesh Kumar Singh	Indian National Congress
2020	Birendra Singh	Bharatiya Janata Party
2025	Birendra Singh	Bharatiya Janata Party

== Election results ==
=== 2025 ===
2025 Bihar Legislative Assembly election: Wazirganj
Party	Candidate	Votes	%	±%
BJP	Birendra Singh	94,574	44.99	+4.76
INC	Awadhesh Kumar Singh	81,841	38.93	+11.46
BSP	Chitranjan Kumar	14,303	6.8	
JSP	Santosh Kumar	5,017	2.39	
Independent	Chandan Kumar	2,251	1.07	
Moolniwasi Samaj Party	Suresh Rajvanshi	1,980	0.94	
NOTA	None of the above	4,460	2.12	+1.24
Majority		12,733	6.06	−6.7
Turnout		210,212	66.62	+10.55
BJP gain from INC		Swing		

=== 2020 ===
2020 Bihar Legislative Assembly election: Wazirganj
Party	Candidate	Votes	%	±%
BJP	Birendra Singh	70,713	40.23	+0.41
INC	Shashi Shekhar Singh	48,283	27.47	−19.89
Independent	Sheetal Prasad Yadav	14,173	8.06	
Bhartiya Sablog Party	Chitranjan Kumar	11,162	6.35	
RLSP	Shreedhar Prasad	7,390	4.2	
JAP(L)	Rajiv Kumar	3,722	2.12	+1.09
Independent	Rajendra Kumar Verma	3,170	1.8	
Independent	Ram Bilash Prasad	2,428	1.38	
Independent	Vandana Singh	2,123	1.21	
Independent	Ranjay Kumar Singh	1,974	1.12	
NOTA	None of the above	1,548	0.88	−2.59
Majority		22,430	12.76	+5.22
Turnout		175,789	56.07	−4.26
BJP gain from INC		Swing		

=== 2015 ===
2015 Bihar Legislative Assembly election: Wazirganj
Party	Candidate	Votes	%	±%
INC	Awadhesh Kumar Singh	80,107	47.36	
BJP	Birendra Singh	67,348	39.82	
CPI	Krishan Dev Yadav	4,158	2.46	
Bharat Bhrashtachar Mitao Party	Sanjay Prasad	1,774	1.05	
Pragatisheel Magahi Samaj	Akhilesh Kumar	1,743	1.03	
JAP(L)	Jitendra Kumar Yadav	1,738	1.03	
Independent	Dipak Kumar	1,541	0.91	
NOTA	None of the above	5,869	3.47	
Majority		12,759	7.54	
Turnout		169,144	60.33	
