= Saud Alam =

Indian politician

Bihar Legislative Assembly
- Preceded by: Naushad Alam
- Constituency: Thakurganj

Personal details
- Party: Rashtriya Janata Dal
- Parent: Mohammad Asrarul Haque (father)
- Education: Darul Uloom Nadwatul Ulama Lucknow
- Occupation: Politics

Saud Alam is an Indian politician and a Rashtriya Janata Dal member of the Bihar Legislative Assembly. He was elected in 2020 representing the Thakurganj (Vidhan Sabha constituency).
