= Birendra Singh =

Indian politician

Member of Bihar Legislative Assembly
- Incumbent
- Assumed office November 2020
- Preceded by: Awadhesh Kumar Singh
- In office 2010–2015
- Preceded by: Himself (Constituency did not exist)
- Succeeded by: Awadhesh Kumar Singh
- Constituency: Wazirganj

Personal details
- Born: 5 August 1955 (age 71)
- Party: Bharatiya Janata Party
- Parent: Yugeshwar Singh
- Occupation: MLA
- Profession: Agriculturist

Birendra Singh is an Indian politician, currently a member of Bharatiya Janata Party and a two time Member of Bihar Legislative Assembly from Wazirganj. He won this seat in 2010 Bihar Legislative Assembly election also.
