= Sarwar Alam =

Indian politician

Member of Bihar Legislative Assembly
- Incumbent
- Assumed office 2025
- Preceded by: Muhammad Izhar Asfi
- Constituency: Kochadhaman

Personal details
- Party: All India Majlis-e-Ittehadul Muslimeen

Sarwar Alam is an Indian politician from All India Majlis-e-Ittehadul Muslimeen and a member of Bihar Legislative Assembly from Kochadhaman Assembly constituency seat.
