= Mahagathbandhan (Bihar) =

Political alliance

- महागठबंधन; Mahagathbandhan
- Abbreviation: MGB
- Leader: Tejashwi Yadav
- Chairman: Tejashwi Yadav
- Secretary: Rajesh Kumar
- Rajya Sabha Leader: Sonia Gandhi
- Lok Sabha Leader: Rahul Gandhi
- Founder: Rahul Gandhi; Prithviraj Chavan; Tejashwi Yadav; Sonia Gandhi
- Founded: 2015; 11 years ago
- Ideology: Majority: Socialism (Indian); Factions: Social democracy; Democratic socialism; Communism
- Political position: Big tent Factions: Centre-left to far-left
- ECI status: Registered
- Alliance: INDIA (National); UPA (Former)
- Seats in Rajya Sabha: 4 / 16 (Total-245, Bihar-16)
- Seats in Lok Sabha: 10 / 40 (Total-543, Bihar-40)
- Seats in Bihar Legislative Council: 18 / 75
- Seats in Bihar Legislative Assembly: 35 / 243
- Number of states and union territories in government: 0 / 31

Mahagathbandhan (MGB), also known as Grand Alliance, is a coalition of political parties in the Eastern state of Bihar in India, formed ahead of the 2015 Vidhan Sabha elections in Bihar. The alliance consists of Rashtriya Janata Dal (RJD), Indian National Congress (INC) and Left-wing parties including Communist Party of India (Marxist–Leninist) Liberation (CPI(ML)L), Communist Party of India (Marxist) (CPI(M)), Communist Party of India (CPI), Vikassheel Insaan Party (VIP) and Indian Inclusive Party (IIP), with Mukesh Sahani as the Leader and Tejashwi Yadav as Chairperson.

== History ==
=== Creation of the alliance (2015–2020) ===
On 7 June 2015, Lalu Prasad Yadav announced the RJD was joining in an alliance with Nitish Kumar led Janata Dal (United) for the upcoming assembly election. On 13 July 2015, he led a march demanding that the central government release its findings from the Socio Economic Caste Census 2011 (SECC) on caste. Union Minister Ram Vilas Paswan supported a comprehensive classification of caste data of SECC 2011 before its release. BJP Leader Sushil Kumar Modi called for a rectification of errors in the cases of 1.46 crore people in India, including 1.75 lakh in Bihar, before releasing the caste data.

On 3 August, incumbent Chief Minister Nitish Kumar declared that he would not stand in the election. On 11 August, he announced the seat-sharing formula, according to which JD(U) and RJD will contest 100 seats each, while Congress will contest 40 seats in Bihar. NCP pulled out of this alliance later. On 23 September, Nitish Kumar announced the list of 242 candidates for the JDU-RJD-INC alliance. OBCs were most favoured in the alliance ticket distribution plan. 10% of tickets were allotted to women candidate by the alliance.

Nitish Kumar was the declared chief ministerial candidate for the Mahagathbandhan (Grand Alliance). Kumar started his Har Ghar Dastak (door-to-door) campaign on 2 July. Initially there were definite political overtures when both Lalu Prasad Yadav and Nitish Kumar shared stage together in a public event commemorating former chief minister Satyendra Narain Sinha's birth anniversary that witnessed veiled attacks on each other, the last time they did it in public. Prashant Kishor was a key election strategist for the alliance.

The Mahagathbandhan contested in Bihar legislative assembly elections of 2015 against Bharatiya Janata Party and its key allies Lok Janshakti Party and Rashtriya Lok Samata Party. The Bharatiya Janata Party and its allies lost badly making the way for JD (U)+RJD+Congress to triumph with 178 out of 243 seats. The BJP and its allies managed to get only 58 seats.

=== Dissent and defection (2020–2022) ===
After successfully winning the elections of 2015, the defection in Mahagathbandhan occurred with alleged attempt of Rashtriya Janata Dal leaders to break Janata Dal (United) elected legislators. Nitish Kumar, the then leader of JD(U) and the Chief Minister for fifth time was thus forced to join the Bharatiya Janata Party and NDA once again to secure the interest of his parties.

However, the entry of JD (U) made other allies of Bhartiya Janata Party embarrassed . Thus the rival party of JD (U), Rashtriya Lok Samata Party drifted away with its leader Upendra Kushwaha from the hold of NDA. The drifting away of Rashtriya Lok Samata Party created uncertainties in the camp of National Democratic Alliance over shifting of the support of Koeri caste on whom RLSP was thought to have strong hold. But in 2019 General Elections the JD(U) balanced the loss incurred due to the defection of Upendra Kushwaha and Bharatiya Janata Party and Janata Dal (United) secured victory over the putatively put alliance of RJD+RLSP+INC+HAM+VIP parties. Subsequently, VIP and HAM switched to the NDA and the RLSP merged with JD(U).

=== Return to power (2022–2023) ===
In August 2022, Rashtriya Janata Dal, Janata Dal (United), Indian National Congress, Communist Party of India (Marxist–Leninist) Liberation, Communist Party of India (Marxist), Communist Party of India and Hindustan Awam Morcha joined again to form 2/3rd Majority government in Bihar Legislative Assembly.

=== Departure of the JD(U) (2024) ===
On 28 January 2024, Janata Dal (United) officially left the Mahagathbandhan to join the National Democratic Alliance for the third time, which also ended the tenure of Tejashwi Yadav, the RJD's candidate and leader of the Mahagathbandhan, as Deputy Chief Minister of Bihar. The political crisis was caused by Nitish Kumar feeling "insulted" by the Mahagathbandhan and the larger Indian National Developmental Inclusive Alliance.

== Current members ==
Party	Ideology	Legislative Assembly	Legislative Council	Lok Sabha (Bihar)
Rashtriya Janata Dal	Socialism, secularism	25 / 243	16 / 75	4 / 40
Indian National Congress	Social liberalism, Secularism, Civic nationalism	6 / 243	1 / 75	4 / 40
Communist Party of India (Marxist–Leninist) Liberation	Marxism–Leninism	2 / 243	1 / 75	2 / 40
Communist Party of India (Marxist)	Communism, Marxism	1 / 243	—N/a	—N/a
Indian Inclusive Party	Progressivism, Socialism	1 / 243	—N/a	—N/a
Vikassheel Insaan Party	Social democracy, Progressivism	—N/a	—N/a	—N/a
Total		35 / 243	18 / 75	10 / 40

== Electoral performance ==
=== Indian general election results in Bihar ===
Year	Seats won/ Seats contested	Change in seats	Vote share (%)	+/- (%)	Popular vote
2019	1 / 40	▼9	32.46%	▼	1,29,10,486
2024	10 / 40	▲9	39.21%	▲	1,75,61,094

=== Bihar State Legislative Assembly election ===
Year	Seats won/ Seats contested	Change in seats	Vote share (%)	+/- (%)	Popular vote
2015	178 / 243	▲37	41.90%	▲	1,59,51,561
2020	110 / 243	▼68	37.23	▼4.67	1,56,91,500
2025	35 / 243	▼75	37.94	▲0.71	1,85,89,587

== Past members ==
Party	Base State	Year of withdrawal
Rashtriya Lok Samta Party	Bihar	2019
Hindustani Awam Morcha	Bihar	2023
Janata Dal (United)	Bihar	2024

== See also ==
- Mahagathbandhan (Jharkhand)
- Maha Vikas Aghadi
- Grand Democratic Secular Front
- Progressive Democratic Alliance (Bihar)
- Jan Suraaj Party
