= Kishanganj =

- City
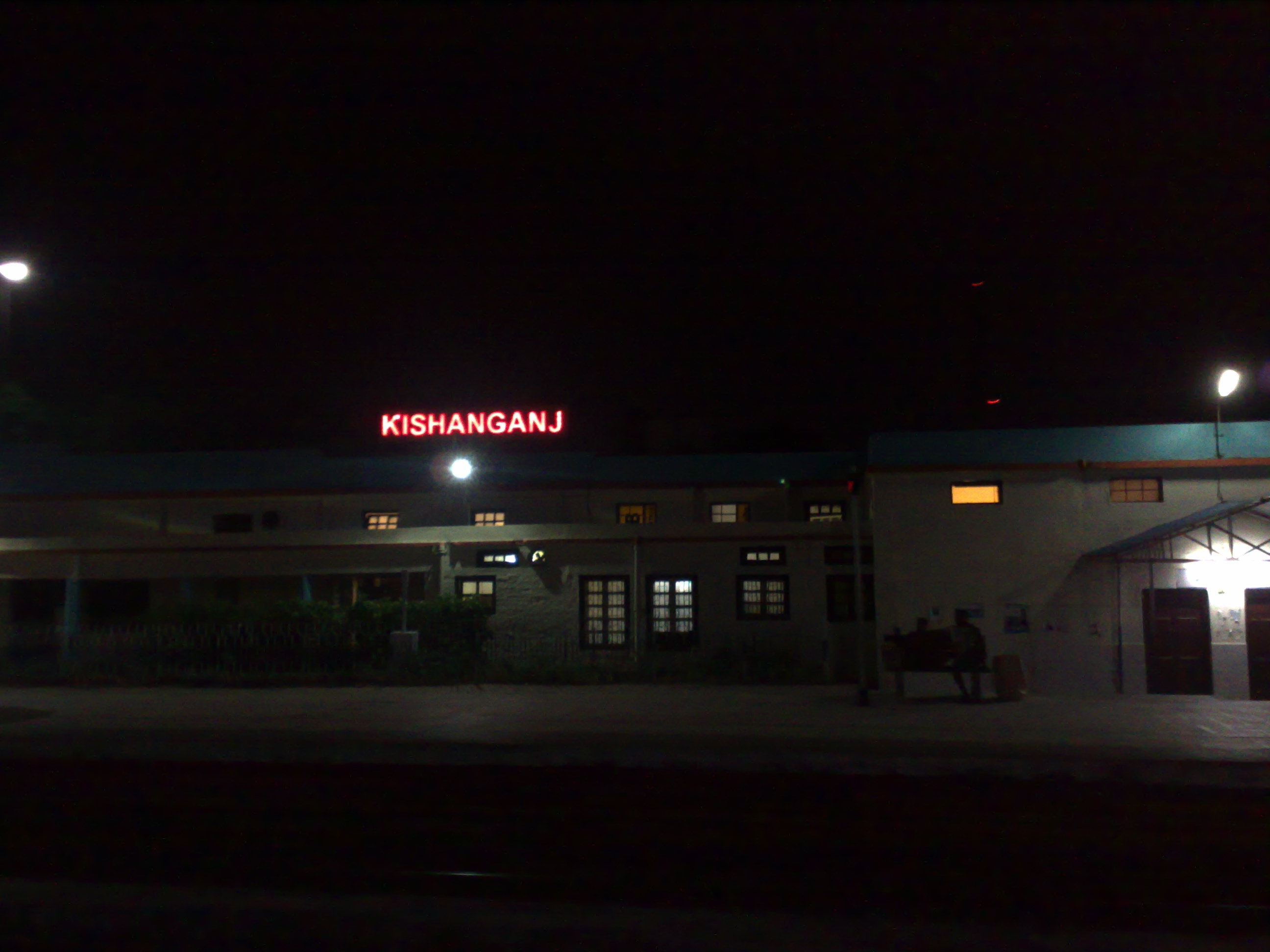
- Kishanganj

- Location in Bihar, India Kishanganj (India)
- Coordinates: 26°05′54.969″N 87°56′43.011″E
- Country: India
- State: Bihar
- Region: Mithila
- District: Kishanganj

Population (2021)
  - Total: 105,782
- Time zone: UTC+5:30 (IST)
- PIN: 855107, 855108
- Vehicle registration: BR-37
- Literacy: 74.71%
- Website: https://kishanganj.nic.in/

Kishanganj is a city and district headquarters of Kishanganj district in Purnia division of Bihar state in India.

== History ==
Kishanganj, which was previously part of Purnia district, is part of the Mithila region.

Mithila first gained prominence after being settled by Indo-Aryan peoples who established the Mithila Kingdom (also called Kingdom of the Videha). During the late Vedic period (c. 1100–500 BCE), the kingdom of the Videha became one of the major political and cultural centres of South Asia, along with Kuru and Pañcāla. The rulers of Videha were called Janakas.

The Mithila Kingdom was later incorporated into the Vajjika League, which had its capital in the city of Vaishali, which is also in Mithila.

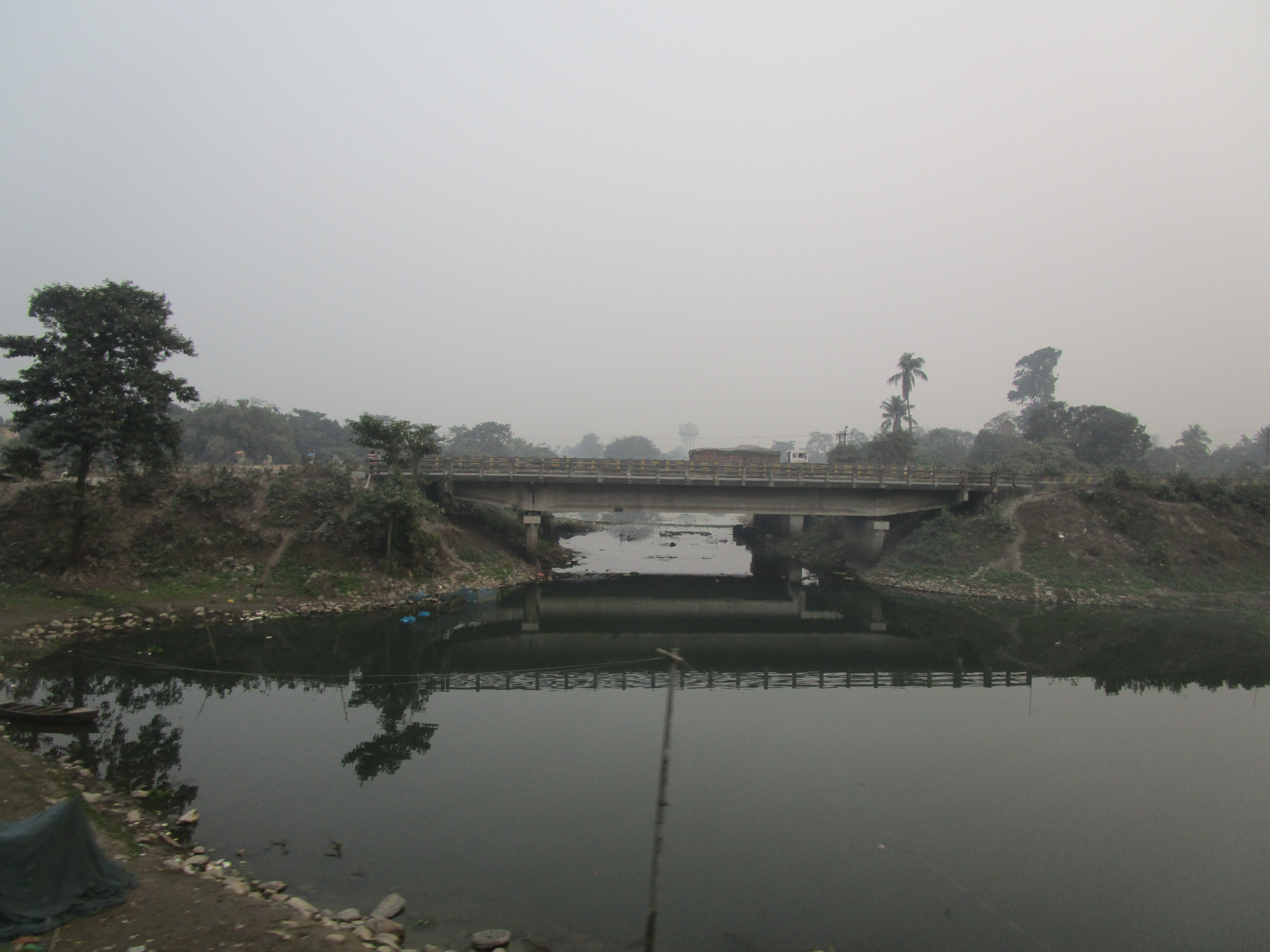
Ramzan River at Kishanganj

== Demographics ==
Religion in Kishanganj town (2011)
Religion	Percent
Hinduism	55.48%
Islam	42.67%
Jainism	1.07%
Other or not stated	0.78%

As of the 2011 Census of India, Kishanganj has a population of 105,782 of which male and female are 55,143 and 50,639 respectively. Literacy rate of Kishanganj city is 73.46% higher than the state average of 61.80%. In Kishanganj, Male literacy is around 78.37% while the female literacy rate is 68.08%. In Kishanganj, Total children (0-6) in Kishanganj city are 16,884 as per figure from Census India report on 2011. There were 8,636 boys while 8,248 are girls. The children form 15.96% of the total population of Kishanganj City. Scheduled Castes and Scheduled Tribes make up 11.63% and 1.52% of the population respectively.

=== Languages ===
Languages spoken in Kishanganj (2011)
1. Hindi 80.73 (59.8%)
2. Urdu 31.18 (23.1%)
3. Surjapuri 7.55 (5.60%)
4. Bengali 7.73 (5.73%)
5. Maithili 4.3 (3.19%)
6. Bhojpuri 3.4 (2.52%)

Hindi is the most spoken language in Kishanganj town. Urdu and Surjapuri are the second-largest languages.

== Agriculture ==
Agricultural produce from the district includes rice, wheat, arhar, masoor and jute. It is only one of the districts in Bihar to produce tea.

== Climate ==
Climate data for Kishanganj, Bihar
Month	Jan	Feb	Mar	Apr	May	Jun	Jul	Aug	Sep	Oct	Nov	Dec	Year
Mean daily maximum °C (°F)	24.0 (75.2)	26.6 (79.9)	31.9 (89.4)	34.7 (94.5)	33.7 (92.7)	32.5 (90.5)	31.9 (89.4)	31.9 (89.4)	31.8 (89.2)	31.1 (88.0)	29.0 (84.2)	25.3 (77.5)	30.4 (86.7)
Mean daily minimum °C (°F)	9.8 (49.6)	11.6 (52.9)	15.9 (60.6)	20.6 (69.1)	23.6 (74.5)	25.2 (77.4)	25.7 (78.3)	25.4 (77.7)	24.8 (76.6)	21.8 (71.2)	15.2 (59.4)	10.7 (51.3)	19.2 (66.6)
Average rainfall mm (inches)	13 (0.5)	15 (0.6)	23 (0.9)	69 (2.7)	227 (8.9)	393 (15.5)	416 (16.4)	371 (14.6)	313 (12.3)	109 (4.3)	6 (0.2)	6 (0.2)	1,961 (77.1)
Average rainy days	2	2	3	8	15	20	21	20	18	8	1	1	119
Average relative humidity (%)	67	59	45	55	75	85	87	86	86	80	66	65	71
Source: en.climate-data.org

https://www.asracbo.org/

== See also ==
- List of cities in Bihar
- List of districts in Bihar
- Mithila
