= Kishanganj district =

District in Bihar, India

- District of Bihar
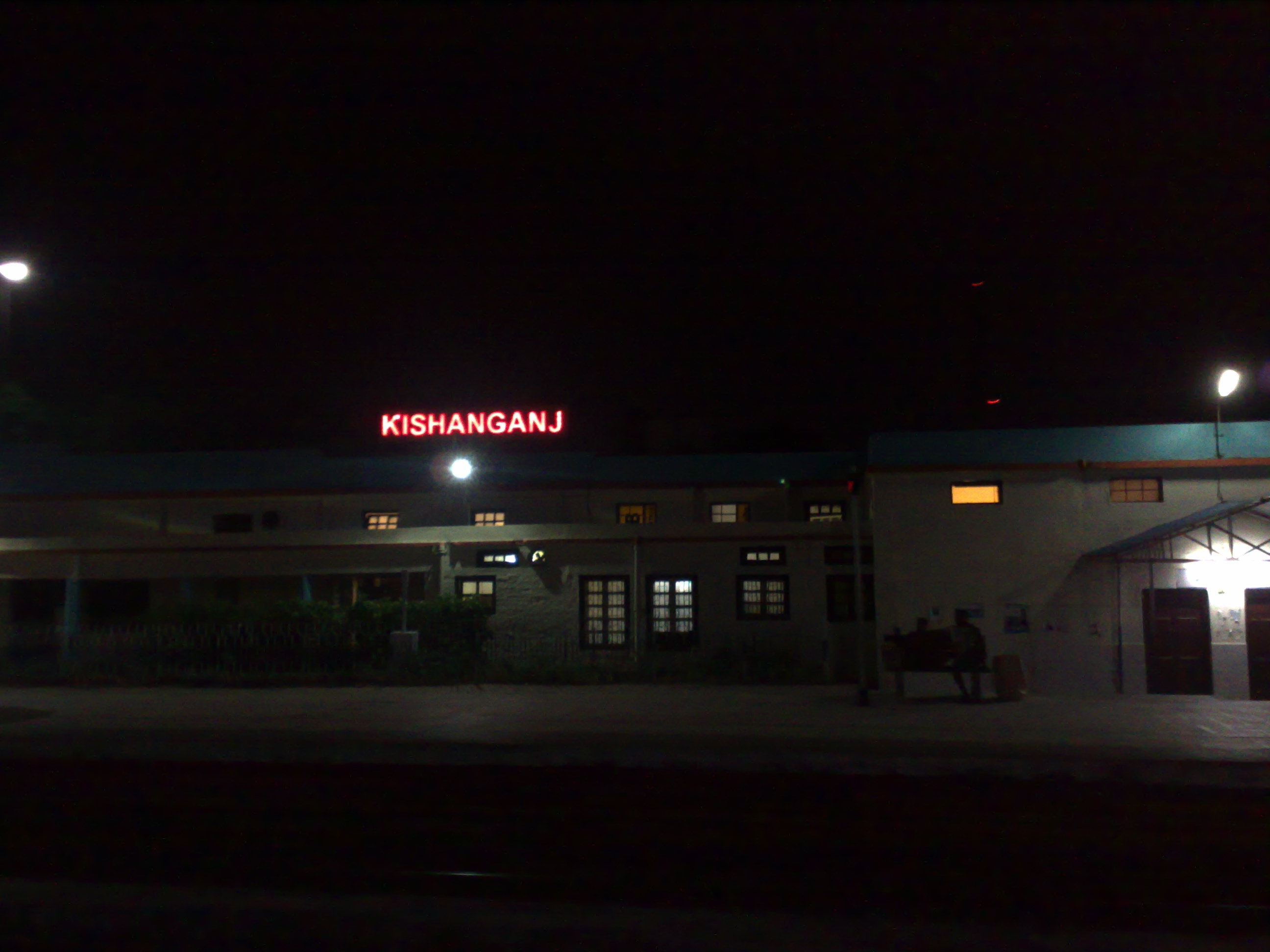
- Kishanganj Railway
- Interactive map of Kishanganj district
- Country: India
- State: Bihar
- Division: Purnia
- Headquarters: Kishanganj

Government
  - Lok Sabha constituencies: Kishanganj
  - Vidhan Sabha constituencies: Bahdurganj, Thakurganj, Kishanganj, Kochadhaman

Area
  - Total: 1,884 km^{2} (727 sq mi)

Population (2011)
  - Total: 1,690,400
  - Density: 897.2/km^{2} (2,324/sq mi)

Demographics
  - Literacy: 57.04 per cent
  - Sex ratio: 946
- Time zone: UTC+05:30 (IST)
- Vehicle registration: BR-37
- Major highways: NH 31
- Website: kishanganj.nic.in

Kishanganj district is the easternmost district of Bihar in India, and Kishanganj town is the administrative headquarters of this district. Kishanganj district is a part of Purnia division (Seemanchal). It is one of the most socio-economically backward and minority concentration districts in the country. The district lies in north eastern Bihar

== Etymology ==
Kishanganj was formerly known as Krishnaganj, but the name was altered to Kishanganj.

== Geography ==
Kishanganj district occupies an area of 1,884 square kilometres (727 sq mi), Kishanganj district is surrounded by Araria district in the west, Purnia district in the south-west, Uttar Dinajpur district of West Bengal on the east, and Darjeeling district of West Bengal and Nepal on the north. A narrow strip of West Bengal, about 20 km wide separates it from Bangladesh.

Kishanganj district is located between 25° 20’ and 26° 30’ north latitudes, and 87° 7’ and 88° 19’ east longitudes.

=== River ===
Major rivers flowing through the district are Mahananda, Kankai, Mechi, Donk, Ratua.

== Politics ==
District	No.	Constituency	Name	Party	Alliance	Remarks
Kishanganj	52	Bahadurganj	Mohammad Tauseef Alam	AIMIM	None	
Kishanganj	53	Thakurganj	Gopal Kumar Agarwal	JD(U)	NDA	
Kishanganj	54	Kishanganj	Qamrul Hoda	INC	MGB	
Kishanganj	55	Kochadhaman	Sarwar Alam	AIMIM	None	

== Economy ==
In 2006 the Ministry of Panchayati Raj named Kishanganj one of the country's 250 most backward districts out of a total of 640. It is one of the 36 districts in Bihar currently receiving funds from the Backward Regions Grant Fund Programme (BRGF).

Kishanganj is the only tea producing district in Bihar.

== History ==
Kishanganj district, which was previously part of Purnia district, is part of the Mithila region. Mithila first gained prominence after being settled by Indo-Aryan peoples who established the Mithila Kingdom (also called Kingdom of the Videhas) which was ruled by the Videhas, an Indo-Aryan tribe. Present Kishanganj was in the western part of the Pundra region which was initially outside the Indo-Aryan band of settlement. There are still tales of the fort of Raja Virat in Thakurganj tehsil who gave the Pandavas shelter during their exile. Pundra was included in the Mauryan Empire, and it was then included in the Gupta Empire. The region was visited by Xuanzang during his travels and was conquered by Shashanka in the early 7th century. The Palas and Senas then took over the district before the Muslim conquest.

In the 13th century Muhammad Bakhtiyar Khalji conquered the entirety of Bengal, including present Kishanganj. However the northern part of Kishanganj was held by the Kiranti tribes. The district was part of a unit along with Purnia, and was regarded as a frontier region of Bengal which always needed to maintain forces to keep the Kiranti peoples in check. During the Mughal period, territory east of the Mahananda, including Kishanganj, was part of the Sarkar of Tajpur in the Bengal Subah. The northern part of Araria and Kishanganj districts were part of the Morang Kingdom of Limbuwan. Kishanganj fell under British rule with the rest of Bengal in 1765. Kishanganj was on one of the main trade routes from Nepal into the rest of India. Kishanganj was on the front line of the Anglo-Nepalese War in 1816.

During the early 20th century Kishanganj subdivision featured in a report of absentee zamindar atrocities against the peasants and the imposition of awbabs. This region participated in the Kisan Sabha movement and later the freedom struggle. Several ashrams were built in Kishanganj and the workers of the subdivision participated in the Quit India movement of 1942, where the Congress flag was hoisted on the Kishanganj court building.

The region was a hotbed of sporadic communal tension in the Purnia district. In 1934 there was a riot in Kishanganj town over a tazia procession during Muharram. The Muslim League had major influence in the Muslim-majority regions of Purnia district including Kishanganj. During the Bihar Riots of 1946, the region was affected and saw some Muslims fleeing the region for safety in Bengal. A sabha of the Provincial Muslim League in Kishanganj in 1947 demanded erstwhile Purnia district along with parts of Bhagalpur, Munger, and the entire Santal Parganas district be transferred to Bengal (which they wanted for Pakistan). These areas were kept in India however when it gained Independence.

In 1956 during the reorganisation of states, parts of Kishanganj subdivision (the present Islampur subdivision), were transferred to West Bengal's West Dinajpur district to connect the two halves of the state which were split by Partition.

Kishanganj was an old and important Sub-Division of Purnia district. After the long and hard struggle of around seventeen years by the people of Kishanganj including social workers, politicians, journalists, businessmen, farmers, etc., the Kishanganj district was carved out of Purnia district on 14 January 1990.

== Sub-divisions ==
The district comprises only one sub-division, Kishanganj, which is further divided into seven blocks:

- Bahadurganj
- Dighalbank
- Kishanganj
- Kochadhaman
- Pothia
- Terhagachha
- Thakurganj

== Education ==
On 30 January 2014, the foundation stone was laid down of the Kishanganj campus of Aligarh Muslim University by Sonia Gandhi. The study centre started out by offering two courses.

== Demographics ==
Historical population
Year	Pop.	±% p.a.
1901	234,482	—
1911	251,966	+0.72%
1921	269,059	+0.66%
1931	291,023	+0.79%
1941	316,813	+0.85%
1951	336,235	+0.60%
1961	459,703	+3.18%
1971	618,773	+3.02%
1981	805,333	+2.67%
1991	984,107	+2.03%
2001	1,296,348	+2.79%
2011	1,690,400	+2.69%

According to the 2011 census Kishanganj district has a population of 1,690,400, roughly equal to the nation of Guinea-Bissau or the US state of Idaho. This gives it a ranking of 293rd in India (out of a total of 640). The district has a population density of 898 inhabitants per square kilometre (2,330/sq mi) . Its population growth rate over the decade 2001-2011 was 30.44%. Kishanganj has a sex ratio of 946 females for every 1,000 males, and a literacy rate of 57.04%. 9.53% of the population lives in urban areas. Scheduled Castes and Scheduled Tribes make up 6.69% and 3.80% of the population respectively.

Religions in Kishanganj district (2011)
Religion	Percent
Islam	67.98%
Hinduism	31.43%
Other or not stated	0.59%

A vast majority of the people live in villages. Kishanganj is the only Muslim-majority district of Bihar, with Muslims forming about 68% of the population. There are also Hindus of whom most are Surjapuris (Rajbanshi). There also are small pockets of Santals. Most of the inhabitants of Kishanganj speak Surjapuri.

Languages in Kishanganj district (2011)
1. Surjapuri (42.6%)
2. Urdu (32.6%)
3. Hindi (9.05%)
4. Bengali (6.66%)
5. Santali (3.45%)
6. Maithili (2.63%)
7. Bhojpuri (1.23%)
8. Others (1.75%)

At the time of the 2011 Census of India, 42.61% of the population in the district spoke Surjapuri, 32.62% Urdu, 9.05 Hindi, 6.66% Bengali, 3.45% Santali, 2.63% Maithili and 1.23% Bhojpuri as their first language.

Gender Ratio of District
Year	1971	1981	1991	2001	2011
1	2	3	4	5	6
Gender Ratio	926	950	946	936	948

== Administrative units ==
Sl. no.	Name of the Blocks	No. of Gram Panchayats
1	Kishanganj	10
2	Bahadurganj	20
3	Thakurganj	22
4	Kochadhaman	24
5	Dighalbank	16
6	Pothia	22
7	Terhagachh	12
Total number of Gram Panchayats		126

- Number of Revenue Division(s)- 1
- Number of Blocks- 7
- Number of Police Stations- 20
- Number of Gram Panchayats- 126
- Number of Census Villages- 771
- Number of Nagar panchayat- 3 [Bahadurganj, Thakurganj, Powakhali]
- Number of Municipal Council- 1 [ Kishanganj]

== Notable people ==
Asrarul Haq Qasmi - eighth general secretary of the Jamiat Ulama-e-Hind
