= 2020 Bihar Legislative Assembly election =

Election in India

- 28 October 2020 – 7 November 2020

All 243 seats in the Bihar Legislative Assembly 122 seats needed for a majority
- Registered: 71,822,450
- Turnout: 57.29% (▲0.38%)
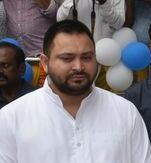

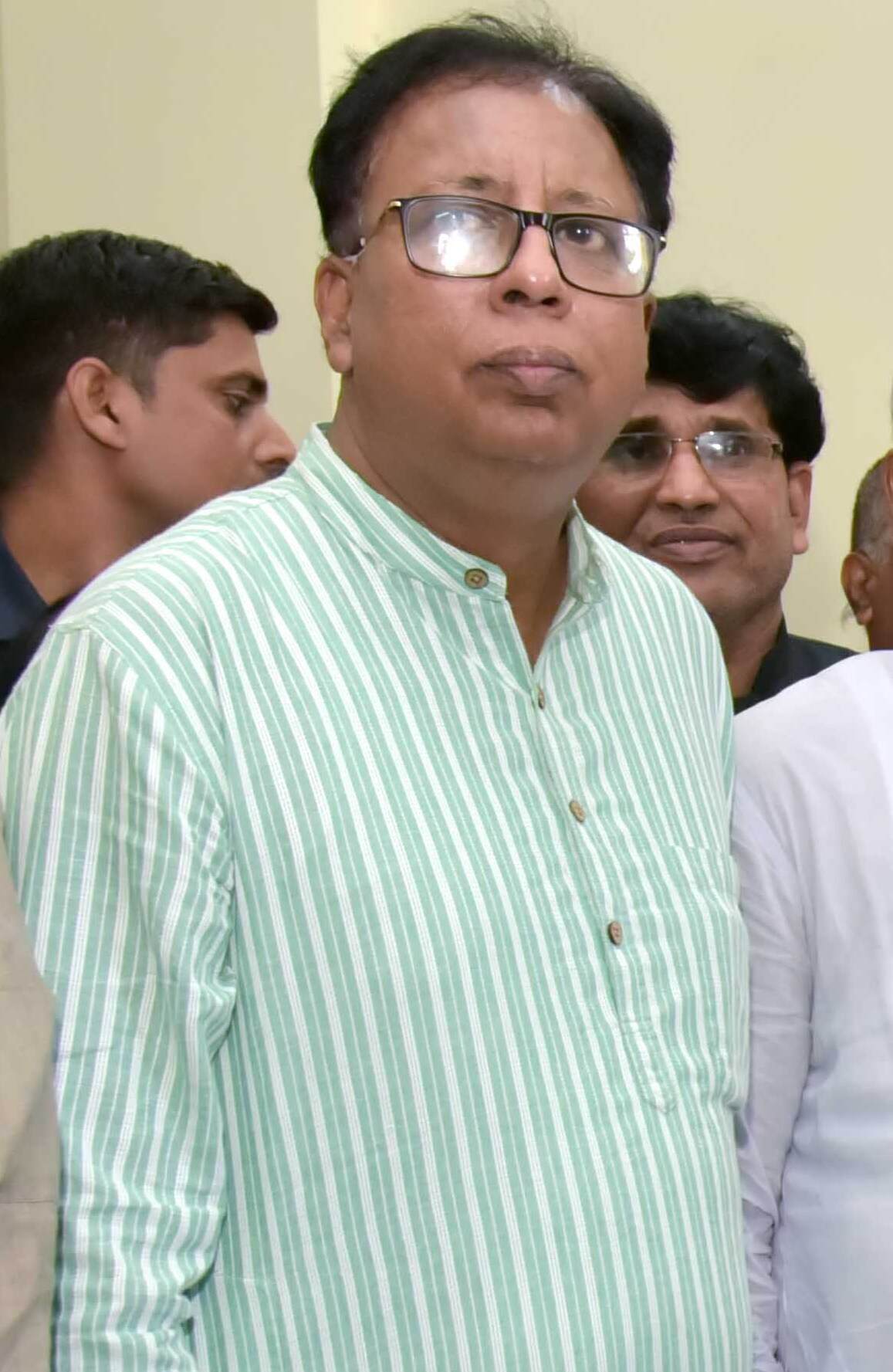

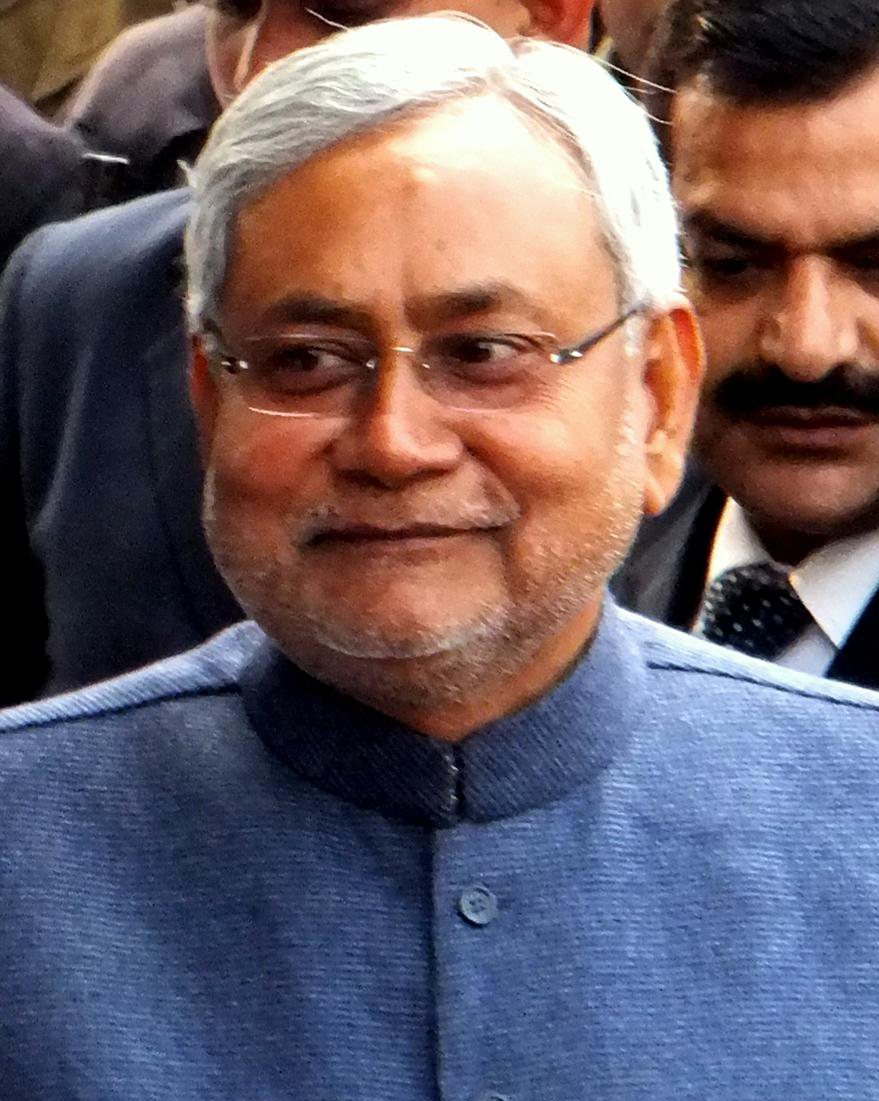
	Majority party	Minority party	Third party
Leader	Tejashwi Yadav	Sanjay Jaiswal	Nitish Kumar
Party	RJD	BJP	JD(U)
Alliance	MGB	NDA	NDA
Leader since	2017	2019	2005
Leader's seat	Raghopur (Won)	Did Not Contest	MLC(didn't contested)
Last election	80	53	71
Seats won	75	74	43
Seat change	▼5	▲21	▼28
Popular vote	97,38,855	82,02,067	64,85,179
Percentage	23.11%	19.46%	15.39%
Swing	▲4.79%	▼4.96%	▼1.44%
	Fourth party	Fifth party	Sixth party
	INC	CPI(ML)L	AIMIM
Leader	Madan Mohan Jha	Dipankar Bhattacharya	Akhtarul Iman
Party	INC	CPI(ML)L	AIMIM
Alliance	MGB	MGB	GDSF
Leader since	2019	1996	2015
Leader's seat	Did not contest	Did Not Contest	Amour (Won)
Last election	27	3	0
Seats won	19	12	5
Seat change	▼8	▲9	▲5
Popular vote	39,95,319	13,33,682	5,25,679
Percentage	9.48%	3.16%	1.66%
Swing	▲2.82%	▲1.66%	▲1.53%

Chief Minister before election
Nitish Kumar
JD(U) NDA
Elected Chief Minister
Nitish Kumar
JD(U) NDA

The Bihar Legislative Assembly election was held in three phases through October–November to elect members to the Seventeenth Bihar Legislative Assembly. The term of the previous Sixteenth Legislative Assembly of Bihar ended on 29 November 2020.

The election was held in three phases for a total of 243 seats:- the first for 71 seats on 28 October 2020, the second for 94 seats on 3 November 2020, and the third for the remaining 78 seats on 7 November 2020. The counting of votes began on 10 November 2020 and the incumbent National Democratic Alliance emerged as the winner with 125 elected MLAs, whereas the principal opposition coalition of Mahagathbandhan won 110 seats. Other minor coalitions and parties won 7 seats while only 1 newly elected MLA was an independent.

After the elections, the incumbent Chief Minister Nitish Kumar was elected as the leader of the National Democratic Alliance in Bihar and was sworn in again as Chief Minister, whereas two new deputy Chief Ministers, Tarkishore Prasad and Renu Devi were inducted to the new ministry. On the other side, Tejashwi Yadav was elected Leader of the Opposition, and also leader of the Mahagathbandhan alliance. Later Vijay Kumar Sinha was elected the new Speaker of the Bihar Legislative Assembly.

== Background ==
Outlined in Article 168 of the Constitution of India, the Bihar Legislative Assembly is the lower house of the bicameral legislature of Bihar and not a permanent body and subject to dissolution. The tenure of the Legislative Assembly is five years from the date appointed for its first sitting unless dissolved sooner. Members of the Legislative Assembly are directly elected by the people. The Tenure of current Bihar Legislative Assembly is scheduled to end on 29 November 2020.

In the previous election, an alliance of three Major Parties consisting of Janata Dal (United), Rashtriya Janata Dal and Indian National Congress named as Mahagathbandhan won against its primary opposition, the Bharatiya Janata Party led National Democratic Alliance. However, in 2017, the Janata Dal (United) Chief Minister Nitish Kumar left the Mahagathbandhan and joined the National Democratic Alliance. While Nitish Kumar remained the Chief Minister, Sushil Kumar Modi of the Bharatiya Janata Party replaced Tejashwi Yadav as the Deputy Chief Minister.

=== Issues ===
The main issue was that of the jobs and the economy. Bihar, for a long time, has been an economically backward state and sends large numbers of migrant laborers to cities across the country. Due to the coronavirus pandemic lockdown, thousands of migrant laborers were forced to return to their home states due to lack of work, and Bihar was one of the most affected by the ensuing humanitarian crisis. Many of these workers blamed the current government for not having jobs for them in the first place, and not providing jobs when the lockdown started. There was also a significant anti-incumbency wave against Nitish, who had been CM for 15 years.

The three agriculture bills passed by the Indian Parliament amid nationwide protests was expected to play a key role in the elections.

Issues such as the lack of employment, alleged politicisation of flood relief in the aftermath of the 2019 Bihar floods and alleged inability of the state government to handle the COVID-19 pandemic were expected to be made an election issue by the opposition parties. The limited digital connectivity in Bihar and the migrant crisis were among the issues which may have had an impact on campaigning and poll outcomes.

The death of the former Lok Janshakti Party president and union cabinet minister, Ram Vilas Paswan on 8 October 2020 was also speculated to have an effect on the prospects of the competing parties. It was reported that the BJP accorded special focus on the politically significant Mithila region which comprises 22 of the 38 districts of the state including Darbhanga, Madhubani, Supaul, Araria, Purnia, Katihar and Samastipur.

== Schedule ==
On 25 September, Election Commission of India announced the dates for Bihar Assembly elections.

Poll event	Phase		
Poll event	I	II	III
Constituencies	71	94	78
Map of constituencies and their phases			
Date of Issue of Notification	1 October 2020	9 October 2020	13 October 2020
Last Date for filling nomination	8 October 2020	16 October 2020	20 October 2020
Scrutiny of nomination	9 October 2020	17 October 2020	21 October 2020
Last date for withdrawal of nomination	12 October 2020	19 October 2020	23 October 2020
Date of poll	28 October 2020	3 November 2020	7 November 2020
Date of Counting of Votes	10 November 2020		
Source: Election Commission of India

== Parties and alliances ==
=== National Democratic Alliance ===
2020 Bihar Legislative Assembly Election NDA Seat Sharing Map

No.	Party	Flag	Symbol	Photo	Leader	Seats contested
1.	Janata Dal (United)				Nitish Kumar	115
2.	Bharatiya Janata Party				Sanjay Jaiswal	110
3.	Vikassheel Insaan Party				Mukesh Sahani	11
4.	Hindustani Awam Morcha				Jitan Ram Manjhi	7
Parties part of the National Democratic alliance at the center but not in state
5.	Lok Janshakti Party				Chirag Paswan	134

The National Democratic Alliance in Bihar is the ruling political group headed by the chief minister Nitish Kumar and comprising primarily the Janata Dal (United) and the Bharatiya Janata Party in the legislative assembly.

In the previous election, the alliance was led by the Bharatiya Janata Party alongside three smaller allies namely the Lok Janshakti Party, the Rashtriya Lok Samta Party and the Hindustani Awam Morcha, while the Janata Dal (United) had contested as part of the current opposition Mahagathbandan. In 2017, the Janata Dal (United) switched alliance which caused the Mahagathbandan government to fall and the National Democratic Alliance came to power. In 2018, two of the partners, the Rashtriya Lok Samata Party and the Hindustani Awam Morcha left the alliance.

During the campaigning phase in August 2020, the alliance was re-joined by the Hindustani Awam Morcha which held one seat in the legislature. Later, the alliance was also joined in by the Vikassheel Insaan Party in October 2020. The campaign however faced problems with persistent attacks on the Janata Dal (United) by the Lok Janshakti Party. Chirag Paswan, the leader of the party in the state was called to Delhi to negotiate with the national leadership of the Bharatiya Janata Party, in the end the Lok Janshakti Party quit the alliance stating that they would contest all seats against the Janata Dal (United) but not against the Bharatiya Janata Party. Following the development, several notable leader of the Bharatiya Janata Party including the state vice president and 2 sitting legislators joined the Lok Janshakti Party to contest against Janata Dal (United) candidates. Later during the campaigning period in October 2020, the Bharatiya Janata Party officially cut ties with the Lok Janshakti Party stating that the National Democratic Alliances in Bihar consisted of the four parties.

According to political analysts the Lok Janshakti Party was unlikely to make any electoral gains but would act as spoilers for the Janata Dal (United) candidates, the development was suggested to have been orchestrated by the Bharatiya Janata Party to gain leverage over the Janata Dal (United) by reducing its final tally. The Bharatiya Janata Party at the time re-asserted that Nitish Kumar would remain the chief ministerial face of the alliance.

Both the Lok Janshakti Party and the Janata Dal (United) are expected to hold sway among certain sections of Scheduled caste voters while the Bharatiya Janta Party are expected to draws its support base from Forward caste voters.

The Janata Dal (United) though relied upon its core voters by giving importance to its Luv-Kush equation in ticket distribution, also gave good representation to the forward castes and EBCs. For 115 seats which it contested 17 forward caste were given party tickets while the Koeri and Kurmi candidates got 17 and 7 seats respectively. The EBCs on the other hand contested on 21 seats out of 115.

=== Mahagathbandhan ===
2020 Bihar Legislative Assembly Election Mahagathbandhan Seat Sharing Map

No.	Party	Flag	Symbol	Photo	Leader	Seats contested
1.	Rashtriya Janata Dal				Tejashwi Yadav	144
2.	Indian National Congress				Madan Mohan Jha	70
3.	Communist Party of India (Marxist–Leninist)				Dipankar Bhattacharya	19
4.	Communist Party of India				Ram Naresh Pandey	6
5.	Communist Party of India (Marxist)				Awadhesh Kumar	4

The Mahagathbandhan is the main opposition political coalition comprising primarily the United Progressive Alliance members Rashtriya Janata Dal and Indian National Congress along with left–wing parties such as CPI and CPI (M).

In the previous election, the Mahagathbandhan formed and initially comprised the Rashtriya Janata Dal, the Janata Dal (United) and the Indian National Congress. It was able to form government following the election but the government fell when the Janata Dal (United) switched sides and joined the National Democratic Alliance. In the opposition, the alliance was joined in by smaller parties like the Rashtriya Lok Samta Party, the Hindustan Awami Morcha and the Vikassheel Insaan Party. The three parties however opted out of the alliance between August–October 2020. In September 2020, the Samajwadi Party which had contested in previous elections in Bihar without success, declared that they would not contest this time and instead support the Rashtriya Janata Dal.

In the meantime, the alliance after negotiations were joined in by the left–wing parties in Bihar; namely the Communist Party of India (Marxist–Leninist) Liberation, the Communist Party of India and the Communist Party of India (Marxist). The new arrangement was described as an experiment beyond the caste based politics in Bihar with a caste plus class strategy. The communist parties in Bihar had historically held a large presence in the state that was reduced following the Mandal Commission, the Liberation group had retained some of its former base and had emerged as the largest non-alliance party in the previous election.

The seat sharing agreement was finalised on 3 October 2020 with the Jharkhand Mukti Morcha included in the alliance. On 7 October, the Jharkhand Mukti Morcha opted out of the alliance in Bihar over disagreements on seat sharing while maintaining that they will continue to uphold their alliance in the state of Jharkhand.

=== Grand Democratic Secular Front ===
In the wake of the 2020 Bihar Legislative Assembly election, Upendra Kushwaha pulled the party out of the Rashtriya Janata Dal led Mahagathbandhan (Grand Alliance). The party entered into an alliance with the Uttar Pradesh based Bahujan Samaj Party and the minor Janvadi Party (Socialist); The UDSA consisted of the Samajwadi Janata Dal Democratic led by the veteran socialist Devendra Prasad Yadav and the All India Majlis-e-Ittehadul Muslimeen. On 8 October 2020, the UDSA and the three party front including the Bahujan Samaj Party were merged into a single coalition called the Grand Democratic Secular Front (GDSF), the alliance additionally included the Suheldev Bharatiya Samaj Party. Among the constituent parties, only the All India Majlis-e-Ittehadul Muslimeen had representation in the assembly through a single legislator.

No.	Party	Flag	Symbol	Photo	Leader	Seats contested
1.	Rashtriya Lok Samta Party				Upendra Kushwaha	104
2.	Bahujan Samaj Party				Ramji Gautam	80
3.	Samajwadi Janata Dal Democratic				Devendra Prasad Yadav	25
4.	All India Majlis-e-Ittehadul Muslimeen				Akhtarul Iman	19
5.	Suheldev Bharatiya Samaj Party				Om Prakash Rajbhar	5
6.	Janvadi Party (Socialist)				Dr. Sanjay Singh Chauhan	5

=== Others ===
There were a number of other smaller parties and coalitions contesting the election, the prospects and impact of these formations have been noted to be marginal. As of January 2020, there were 120 unrecognised registered parties in Bihar.

On 2 October 2020, there were reportedly four other noteworthy alliances that had emerged; Progressive Democratic Alliance (PDA), United Democratic Alliance (UDA). PDA consisted of Pappu Yadav's Jan Adhikar Party, Chandrashekhar Azad's Azad Samaj Party, Social Democratic Party of India and Bahujan Mukti Party. The UDA consisted of a front of 20 parties collectively led by the former Bharatiya Janata Party cabinet minister Yashwant Sinha and other transiently popular mass leaders. The newly formed The Plurals Party (TPP, दप्पा) also contested the election in 2020 on all 243 seats.

In the meantime, the UDA which was the front led by Yashwant Sinha had reportedly fallen apart as various members of the constituent parties had defected to join the mainstream regional and national parties. Other notable parties that contested independent of an alliance, are the Lok Janshakti Party on 134 seats, the Loktantrik Janata Dal on 51 seats, the Shiv Sena on 30–40 seats and the Jharkhand Mukti Morcha on 7 seats.

== Candidates ==
Assembly Constituency		NDA		MGB		LJP	
#	Name	Party	Candidate	Party	Candidate	Party	Candidate
West Champaran District
1	Valmiki Nagar	JD(U)	Dhirendra Pratap Singh	INC	Rajesh Singh	LJP	Mahendra Kumar Bharti
2	Ramnagar (SC)	BJP	Bhagirathi Devi	INC	Rajesh Ram		
3	Narkatiaganj	BJP	Rashmi Verma	INC	Vinay Verma	LJP	Naushad Alam
4	Bagaha	BJP	Ram Singh	INC	Jayesh Mangal Singh		
5	Lauriya	BJP	Vinay Bihari	RJD	Shambhu Tiwari		
6	Nautan	BJP	Narayan Prasad	INC	Sheikh Kamran		
7	Chanpatia	BJP	Umakant Singh	INC	Abhishek Ranjan		
8	Bettiah	BJP	Renu Devi	INC	Madan Mohan Tiwari		
9	Sikta	JD(U)	Khurshid (Feroz Ahmad)	CPI(ML)L	Birendra Prasad Gupta	IND	Dilip Varma (Note: IND in Sikta Supported By LJP.)
East Champaran District
10	Raxaul	BJP	Pramod Kumar Sinha	INC	Rambabu Yadav		
11	Sugauli	VIP	Ramchandra Sahani	RJD	Shashi Bhushan Singh	LJP	Vijay Prasad Gupta
12	Narkatiya	JD(U)	Shyam Bihari Prasad	RJD	Shamim Ahmad	LJP	Sonu Kumar
13	Harsidhi (SC)	BJP	Krishnanandan Paswan	RJD	Kumar Nagendra		
14	Govindganj	BJP	Sunil Mani Tiwari	INC	Brajesh Pandey	LJP	Raju Tiwari
15	Kesaria	JD(U)	Shalini Mishra	RJD	Santosh Kushawaha	LJP	Ram Sharan Prasad Yadav
16	Kalyanpur	BJP	Sachindra Prasad Singh	RJD	Manoj Kumar Yadav		
17	Pipra	BJP	Shyambabu Prasad Yadav	CPI(M)	Rajmangal Prasad		
18	Madhuban	BJP	Rana Randhir Singh	RJD	Madan Prasad		
19	Motihari	BJP	Pramod Kumar	RJD	Om Prakash Choudhary		
20	Chiraia	BJP	Lal Babu Prasad Gupta	RJD	Acchelal Yadav		
21	Dhaka	BJP	Pawan Jaiswal	RJD	Faisal Rahman		
Sheohar District
22	Sheohar	JD(U)	Sharfuddin	RJD	Chetan Anand Singh	LJP	Vijay Kumar Pandey
Sitamarhi District
23	Riga	BJP	Moti Lal Prasad	INC	Amit Kumar Tunna		
24	Bathnaha (SC)	BJP	Anil Ram	INC	Sanjay Ram		
25	Parihar	BJP	Gayatri Devi	RJD	Ritu Jaiswal		
26	Sursand	JD(U)	Dilip Ray	RJD	Syed Abu Dojana	LJP	Amit Choudhari
27	Bajpatti	JD(U)	Ranju Geeta	RJD	Mukesh Kumar Yadav	LJP	MD Intakhab Alam
28	Sitamarhi	BJP	Mitilesh Kumar	RJD	Sunil Kumar		
29	Runnisaidpur	JD(U)	Pankaj Kumar Mishra	RJD	Mangita Devi	LJP	Guddi Devi
30	Belsand	JD(U)	Sunita Singh Chauhan	RJD	Sanjay Kumar Gupta	LJP	Md Nasir Ahmad
Madhubani District
31	Harlakhi	JD(U)	Sudhanshu Shekhar	CPI	Ram Naresh Pandey	LJP	Vikash Kumar Misra
32	Benipatti	BJP	Vinod Narayan Jha	INC	Bhawana Jha		
33	Khajauli	BJP	Arun Shankar Prasad	RJD	Sitaram Yadav		
34	Babubarhi	JD(U)	Mina Kumari	RJD	Uma Kant Yadav	LJP	Amar Nath Prasad
35	Bisfi	BJP	Haribhushan Thakur	RJD	Faiyaz Ahmad		
36	Madhubani	VIP	Suman Kumar Mahaseth	RJD	Samir Kumar Mahaseth	LJP	Arvind Kumar Purbey
37	Rajnagar (SC)	BJP	Ram Prit Paswan	RJD	Ramawatar Paswan		
38	Jhanjharpur	BJP	Nitish Mishra	CPI	Ram Narayan Yadav		
39	Phulparas	JD(U)	Sheela Mandal	INC	Kripanath Pathak	LJP	Binod Kumar Singh
40	Laukaha	JD(U)	Laxmeshwar Rai	RJD	Bharat Bhushan Mandal	LJP	Pramod Kumar Priyedarshi
Supaul District
41	Nirmali	JD(U)	Aniruddha Prasad Yadav	RJD	Yaduvansh Kumar Yadav	LJP	Gautam Kumar
42	Pipra	JD(U)	Ram Vilas Kamat	RJD	Vishwa Mohan Kumar	LJP	Shakuntala Prasad
43	Supaul	JD(U)	Bijendra Prasad Yadav	INC	Minnauttallah Rahmani	LJP	Prabhash Chandra Mandal
44	Triveniganj (SC)	JD(U)	Veena Bharti	RJD	Santosh Sardar	LJP	Renu Lata Bharti
45	Chhatapur	BJP	Neeraj Kumar Singh	RJD	Vipin Kumar Nonia		
Araria District
46	Narpatganj	BJP	Jai Prakash Yadav	RJD	Anil Kumar Yadav		
47	Raniganj (SC)	JD(U)	Achmit Rishidev	RJD	Avinash Mangalam	LJP	Parmanand Rishidev
48	Forbesganj	BJP	Vidya Sagar Keshri	INC	Zakir Hussain		
49	Araria	JD(U)	Shagufta Azim	INC	Avidur Rahman	LJP	Chandra Shekhar Singh Baban
50	Jokihat	BJP	Ranjeet Yadav	RJD	Sarfaraz Alam		
51	Sikti	BJP	Vijay Mandal	RJD	Shatrughan Mandal		
Kishanganj District
52	Bahadurganj	VIP	Lakhan Lal Pandit	INC	Md. Tauseef Alam		
53	Thakurganj	JD(U)	Naushad Alam	RJD	Saud Alam	LJP	Mahommad Kalim Uddin
54	Kishanganj	BJP	Sweety Singh	INC	Ijaharul Hussain		
55	Kochadhaman	JD(U)	Mujahid Alam	RJD	Shahid Alam	LJP	Habibur Rahman
Purnia District
56	Amour	JD(U)	Saba Zafar	INC	Abdul Jalil Mastan	LJP	Manoj Kumar Nishad
57	Baisi	BJP	Vinod Kumar Yadav	RJD	Abdus Subhan		
58	Kasba	HAM(S)	Rajendra Yadav	INC	Md. Afaque Alam	LJP	Pradeep Kumar Das
59	Banmankhi (SC)	BJP	Krishna Kumar Rishi	RJD	Upendra Sharma		
60	Rupauli	JD(U)	Bima Bharti	CPI	Vikas Chandra Mandal	LJP	Shankar Singh
61	Dhamdaha	JD(U)	Leshi Singh	RJD	Dilip Kumar Yadav	LJP	Yogendra Kumar
62	Purnia	BJP	Vijay Kumar Khemka	INC	Indu Sinha		
Katihar District
63	Katihar	BJP	Tarkishore Prasad	RJD	Ram Prakash Mahto		
64	Kadwa	JD(U)	Suraj Prasad Rai	INC	Shakeel Ahmad Khan	LJP	Chandra Bhushan Thakur
65	Balrampur	VIP	Barun Kumar Jha	CPI(ML)L	Mahbub Alam	LJP	Sangita Devi
66	Pranpur	BJP	Nisha Singh	INC	Tauquir Alam		
67	Manihari (ST)	JD(U)	Shambhu Suman	INC	Manohar Prasad Singh	LJP	Anil Kumar Oraon
68	Barari	JD(U)	Vijay Singh Nishad	RJD	Neeraj Kumar	LJP	Bibhash Chandra Choudhary
69	Korha (SC)	BJP	Kavita Paswan	INC	Poonam Paswan		
Madhepura District
70	Alamnagar	JD(U)	Narendra Narayan Yadav	RJD	Naveen Nishad	LJP	Sunila Devi
71	Bihariganj	JD(U)	Niranjan Kumar Mehta	INC	Subhashini Raj Rao	LJP	Vijay Kumar Singh
72	Singheshwar (SC)	JD(U)	Ramesh Rishidev	RJD	Chandrahas Choupal	LJP	Amit Kumar Bharti
73	Madhepura	JD(U)	Nikhil Mandal	RJD	Chandra Shekhar	LJP	Saakar Suresh Yadav
Saharsa District
74	Sonbarsha (SC)	JD(U)	Ratnesh Sada	INC	Tarni Rishidev	LJP	Sarita Devi
75	Saharsa	BJP	Alok Ranjan Jha	RJD	Lovely Anand		
76	Simri Bakhtiarpur	VIP	Mukesh Sahani	RJD	Yusuf Salahuddin	LJP	Sanjay Kumar Singh
77	Mahishi	JD(U)	Gunjeshwar Sah	RJD	Gautam Krishna	LJP	Abdur Razzaque
Darbhanga District
78	Kusheshwar Asthan (SC)	JD(U)	Shashi Bhushan Hajari	INC	Ashok Kumar	LJP	Poonam Kumari
79	Gaura Bauram	VIP	Swarna Singh	RJD	Afzal Ali Khan	LJP	Rajeev Kumar Thakur
80	Benipur	JD(U)	Binay Kumar Choudhary	INC	Mithilesh Chaudhary	LJP	Kamal Ram Vinod Jha
81	Alinagar	VIP	Mishri Lal Yadav	RJD	Binod Mishra	LJP	Raj Kumar Jha
82	Darbhanga Rural	JD(U)	Faraz Fatmi	RJD	Lalit Kumar Yadav	LJP	Pradeep Kumar Thakur
83	Darbhanga	BJP	Sanjay Saraogi	RJD	Amarnath Gami		
84	Hayaghat	BJP	Ramchandra Shah	RJD	Bhola Yadav		
85	Bahadurpur	JD(U)	Madan Sahni	RJD	Ramesh Chaudhary	LJP	Devendra Kumar Jha
86	Keoti	BJP	Murari Mohan Jha	RJD	Abdul Bari Siddiqui		
87	Jale	BJP	Jibesh Kumar Mishra	INC	Maskoor Usmani		
Muzaffarpur District
88	Gaighat	JD(U)	Maheshwar Prasad Yadav	RJD	Niranjan Rai	LJP	Komal Singh
89	Aurai	BJP	Ram Surat Ray	CPI(ML)L	Aftab Alam		
90	Minapur	JD(U)	Manoj Kumar	RJD	Rajeev Kumar (Munna Yadav)	LJP	Ajay Kumar
91	Bochahan (SC)	VIP	Musafir Paswan	RJD	Ramai Ram	LJP	Amar Azad
92	Sakra (SC)	JD(U)	Ashok Kumar Choudhary	INC	Umesh Kumar Ram	LJP	Sanjay Paswan
93	Kurhani	BJP	Kedar Gupta	RJD	Anil Kumar Sahni		
94	Muzaffarpur	BJP	Suresh Kumar Sharma	INC	Bijender Chaudhary		
95	Kanti	JD(U)	Mohammad Jamal	RJD	Mohammad Israil Mansuri	LJP	Bijay Prasad Singh
96	Baruraj	BJP	Arun Kumar Singh	RJD	Nand Kumar Rai		
97	Paroo	BJP	Ashok Kumar Singh	INC	Anunay Kumar Singh		
98	Sahebganj	VIP	Raju Kumar Singh	RJD	Ram Vichar Ray	LJP	Krishan Kumar Singh
Gopalganj District
99	Baikunthpur	BJP	Mithlesh Tiwari	RJD	Prem Shankar		
100	Barauli	BJP	Rampravesh Rai	RJD	Reyazul Haque Raju		
101	Gopalganj	BJP	Subash Singh	INC	Asif Gafoor		
102	Kuchaikote	JD(U)	Amarendra Kumar Pandey	INC	Kali Prasad Pandey	LJP	Ravi Pandey
103	Bhore (SC)	JD(U)	Sunil Kumar	CPI(ML)L	Jitendra Paswan	LJP	Pushpa Devi
104	Hathua	JD(U)	Ramsewak Singh Kushwaha	RJD	Rajesh Kumar Singh	LJP	Ramdarshan Prasad
Siwan District
105	Siwan	BJP	Om Prakash Yadav	RJD	Awadh Bihari Choudhary		
106	Ziradei	JD(U)	Kamla Kushwaha	CPI(ML)L	Amarjeet Kushwaha	LJP	Vinod Tiwari
107	Darauli (SC)	BJP	Ramayan Manjhi	CPI(ML)L	Satyadeo Ram		
108	Raghunathpur	JD(U)	Rajeshwar Chouhan	RJD	Hari Shankar Yadav	LJP	Manoj Kumar Singh
109	Daraunda	BJP	Karanjeet Singh	CPI(ML)L	Amarnath Yadav		
110	Barharia	JD(U)	Shyam Bahadur Singh	RJD	Bachcha Pandey	LJP	Birabahadur Singh
111	Goriakothi	BJP	Devesh Kant Singh	RJD	Nutan Verma		
112	Maharajganj	JD(U)	Hem Narayan Sah	INC	Vijay Shanker Dubey	LJP	Kumar Deo Ranjan Singh
Saran District
113	Ekma	JD(U)	Sita Devi	RJD	Sri Kant Yadav	LJP	Kameshwar Singh
114	Manjhi	JD(U)	Madhvi Singh	CPI(M)	Satyendra Yadav	LJP	Saurabh Kumar Pandey
115	Baniapur	VIP	Virendra Kumar Ojha	RJD	Kedarnath Singh	LJP	Tarkeshwar Singh
116	Taraiya	BJP	Janak Singh	RJD	Sipahilal Mahato		
117	Marhaura	JD(U)	Altaf Alam	RJD	Jitendra Kumar Ray	LJP	Vinay Kumar
118	Chapra	BJP	C.N. Gupta	RJD	Randhir Kumar Singh		
119	Garkha (SC)	BJP	Gyanchand Manjhi	RJD	Surendra Ram		
120	Amnour	BJP	Krishan Kumar Mantoo	RJD	Sunil Kumar Ray		
121	Parsa	JD(U)	Chandrika Roy	RJD	Chhote Lal Ray	LJP	Rakesh Kumar Singh
122	Sonepur	BJP	Vinay Kumar Singh	RJD	Ramanuj Prasad Yadav		
Vaishali District
123	Hajipur	BJP	Awadhesh Singh	RJD	Deo Kumar Chaurasia		
124	Lalganj	BJP	Sanjay Kumar Singh	INC	Rakesh Kumar	LJP	Raj Kumar Sah
125	Vaishali	JD(U)	Siddharth Patel	INC	Sanjeev Singh	LJP	Ajay Kumar Kushwaha
126	Mahua	JD(U)	Ashma Parveen	RJD	Mukesh Kumar Raushan	LJP	Sanjay Kumar Singh
127	Raja Pakar (SC)	JD(U)	Mahendra Ram	INC	Pratima Kumari Das	LJP	Dhananjay Kumar Paswan
128	Raghopur	BJP	Satish Kumar Yadav	RJD	Tejashwi Yadav	LJP	Rakesh Raushan
129	Mahnar	JD(U)	Umesh Singh Kushwaha	RJD	Bina Singh	LJP	Rabindra Kumar Singh
130	Patepur (SC)	BJP	Lakhendra Kumar Raushan	RJD	Shivchandra Ram		
Samastipur District
131	Kalyanpur (SC)	JD(U)	Maheshwar Hazari	CPI(ML)L	Ranjeet Kumar Ram	LJP	Mona Prasad Sundeshwar Ram
132	Warisnagar	JD(U)	Ashok Kumar Singh	CPI(ML)L	Phoolbabu Singh	LJP	Urmila Sinha
133	Samastipur	JD(U)	Ashwamedh Devi	RJD	Akhtarul Islam Shahin	LJP	Mahendra Pradhan
134	Ujiarpur	BJP	Sheel Kumar Roy	RJD	Alok Kumar Mehta		
135	Morwa	JD(U)	Vidyasagar Singh Nishad	RJD	Ranvijay Sahu	LJP	Abhay Kumar Singh
136	Sarairanjan	JD(U)	Vijay Kumar Chaudhary	RJD	Arvind Kumar Sahni	LJP	Abhash Kumar Jha
137	Mohiuddinnagar	BJP	Rajesh Singh	RJD	Ejya Yadav		
138	Bibhutipur	JD(U)	Ram Balak Singh Kushwaha	CPI(M)	Ajay Kumar Kushwaha	LJP	Chandrabali Thakur
139	Rosera (SC)	BJP	Birendra Paswan	INC	Nagendra Vikal	LJP	Krishan Raj Paswan
140	Hasanpur	JD(U)	Raj Kumar Ray	RJD	Tej Pratap Yadav	LJP	Manish Kumar Sahni
Begusarai District
141	Cheria-Bariarpur	JD(U)	Manju Verma	RJD	Raj Banshi Mahto	LJP	Rakhi Devi
142	Bachhwara	BJP	Surendra Mehta	CPI	Awadhesh Kumar Rai		
143	Teghra	JD(U)	Birendra Kumar	CPI	Ram Ratan Singh	LJP	Lalan Kumar
144	Matihani	JD(U)	Narendra Kumar Singh	CPI(M)	Rajendra Prasad Singh	LJP	Raj Kumar Singh
145	Sahebpur Kamal	JD(U)	Shashikant Kumar Shashi	RJD	Sattanand Sambuddha	LJP	Surendra Kumar
146	Begusarai	BJP	Kundan Kumar	INC	Amita Bhushan		
147	Bakhri (SC)	BJP	Ramshankar Paswan	CPI	Suryakant Paswan		
Khagaria District
148	Alauli (SC)	JD(U)	Sadhna Devi	RJD	Ramvriksh Sada	LJP	Ram Chandra Sada
149	Khagaria	JD(U)	Poonam Devi Yadav	INC	Chatrapati Yadav	LJP	Renu Kumari Singh
150	Beldaur	JD(U)	Panna Lal Singh Patel	INC	Chandan Kumar	LJP	Mithilesh Kumar Nishad
151	Parbatta	JD(U)	Sanjeev Kumar Singh	RJD	Digambar Prasad Tiwary	LJP	Aditya Kumar Shyour
Bhagalpur District
152	Bihpur	BJP	Kumar Shailendra	RJD	Shailesh Kumar Mandal		
153	Gopalpur	JD(U)	Narendra Kumar Niraj	RJD	Shailesh Kumar	LJP	Suresh Bhagat
154	Pirpainti (SC)	BJP	Lalan Kumar Paswan	RJD	Ram Vilash Paswan		
155	Kahalgaon	BJP	Pawan Kumar Yadav	INC	Shubhanand Mukesh		
156	Bhagalpur	BJP	Rohit Pandey	INC	Ajeet Sharma	LJP	Rajesh Verma
157	Sultanganj	JD(U)	Lalit Narayan Mandal	INC	Lalan Kumar	LJP	Nilam Devi
158	Nathnagar	JD(U)	Lakshmikant Mandal	RJD	Ali Ashraf Siddiqui	LJP	Amarnath Prasad
Banka District
159	Amarpur	JD(U)	Jayant Raj Kushwaha	INC	Jitendra Singh	LJP	Mrinal Shekhar
160	Dhoraiya (SC)	JD(U)	Manish Kumar	RJD	Bhudeo Choudhary	LJP	Dipak Kumar Paswan
161	Banka	BJP	Ram Narayan Mandal	RJD	Javed Iqbal Ansari		
162	Katoria (ST)	BJP	Nikki Hembrom	RJD	Sweety Sima Hembram		
163	Belhar	JD(U)	Manoj Yadav	RJD	Ramdeo Yadav	LJP	Kumari Archana Yadav
Munger District
164	Tarapur	JD(U)	Mewa Lal Choudhary	RJD	Divya Prakash	LJP	Mina Devi
165	Munger	BJP	Pranav Kumar Yadav	RJD	Avinash Kumar Vidyarthi		
166	Jamalpur	JD(U)	Shailesh Kumar	INC	Ajay Kumar Singh	LJP	Durgesh Kumar Singh
Lakhisarai District
167	Suryagarha	JD(U)	Ramanand Mandal	RJD	Prahlad Yadav	LJP	Ravishanker Prasad Singh
168	Lakhisarai	BJP	Vijay Kumar Sinha	INC	Amaresh Kumar		
Sheikhpura District
169	Sheikhpura	JD(U)	Randhir Kumar Soni	RJD	Vijay Kumar	LJP	Imam Ghazali
170	Barbigha	JD(U)	Sudarshan Kumar	INC	Gajanand Shahi	LJP	Madhukar Kumar
Nalanda District
171	Asthawan	JD(U)	Jitendra Kumar	RJD	Anil Kumar	LJP	Ramesh Kumar
172	Biharsharif	BJP	Sunil Kumar	RJD	Sunil Kumar		
173	Rajgir (SC)	JD(U)	Kaushal Kishore	INC	Ravi Jyoti Kumar	LJP	Manju Devi
174	Islampur	JD(U)	Chandrasen Prasad	RJD	Rakesh Kumar Raushan	LJP	Naresh Prasad Singh
175	Hilsa	JD(U)	Krishnamurari Sharan	RJD	Shakti Singh Yadav	LJP	Kumar Suman Singh
176	Nalanda	JD(U)	Shrawan Kumar	INC	Gunjan Patel	LJP	Ram Keshwar Prasad
177	Harnaut	JD(U)	Harinarayan Singh	INC	Kundan Gupta	LJP	Mamta Devi
Patna District
178	Mokama	JD(U)	Rajiv Lochan Narayan Singh	RJD	Anant Kumar Singh	LJP	Suresh Singh Nishad
179	Barh	BJP	Gyanendra Kumar Singh	INC	Satyendra Bahadur		
180	Bakhtiarpur	BJP	Ranvijay Singh Yadav	RJD	Aniruddh Kumar Yadav		
181	Digha	BJP	Sanjeev Chaurasiya	CPI(ML)L	Shashi Yadav		
182	Bankipur	BJP	Nitin Nabin	INC	Luv Sinha		
183	Kumhrar	BJP	Arun Kumar Sinha	RJD	Dharamendra Kumar		
184	Patna Sahib	BJP	Nand Kishore Yadav	INC	Parveen Khushwaha		
185	Fatuha	BJP	Satyendra Kumar Singh	RJD	Rama Nand Yadav		
186	Danapur	BJP	Asha Devi Yadav	RJD	Ritlal Yadav		
187	Maner	BJP	Nikhil Anand Yadav	RJD	Bhai Virendra		
188	Phulwari (SC)	JD(U)	Arun Manjhi	CPI(ML)L	Gopal Ravidas		
189	Masaurhi (SC)	JD(U)	Nutan Paswan	RJD	Rekha Devi	LJP	Parshuram Kumar
190	Paliganj	JD(U)	Jai Vardhan Yadav	CPI(ML)L	Sandeep Saurav Yadav	LJP	Usha Vidyarthi
191	Bikram	BJP	Atul Kumar	INC	Siddharth Saurav		
Bhojpur District
192	Sandesh	JD(U)	Vijendra Yadav	RJD	Kiran Devi	LJP	Shweta Singh
193	Barhara	BJP	Raghvendra Pratap Singh	RJD	Saroj Yadav		
194	Arrah	BJP	Amrendra Pratap Singh	CPI(ML)L	Quyamuddin Ansari		
195	Agiaon (SC)	JD(U)	Prabhunath Prasad	CPI(ML)L	Manoj Manzil	LJP	Rajeshwar Paswan
196	Tarari	BJP	Kaushal Kumar Singh	CPI(ML)L	Sudama Prasad		
197	Jagdishpur	JD(U)	Shushumlata Kushwaha	RJD	Ram Vishnu Singh	LJP	Sri Bhagwan Singh Kushwaha
198	Shahpur	BJP	Munni Devi	RJD	Rahul Tiwari		
Buxar District
199	Brahampur	VIP	Jairaj Chaudhary Bind	RJD	Shambhunath Yadav	LJP	Hulas Pandey
200	Buxar	BJP	Parshuram Chaubey	INC	Sanjay Kumar Tiwari		
201	Dumraon	JD(U)	Anjum Ara	CPI(ML)L	Ajit Kumar Singh	LJP	Akhilesh Kumar Singh
202	Rajpur (SC)	JD(U)	Santosh Kumar Nirala	INC	Vishwanath Ram	LJP	Nirbhaya Kumar Nirala
Kaimur District
203	Ramgarh	BJP	Ashok Kumar Singh	RJD	Sudhakar Singh		
204	Mohania (SC)	BJP	Niranjan Ram	RJD	Sangita Kumari		
205	Bhabua	BJP	Rinki Rani Pandey	RJD	Bharat Bind		
206	Chainpur	BJP	Brij Kishor Bind	INC	Prakash Kumar Singh		
Rohtas District
207	Chenari (SC)	JD(U)	Lalan Paswan	INC	Murari Prasad Gautam	LJP	Chandra Shekhar Paswan
208	Sasaram	JD(U)	Ashok Kumar	RJD	Rajesh Kumar Gupta	LJP	Rameshwar Chaurasiya
209	Kargahar	JD(U)	Bashist Singh	INC	Santosh Kumar Mishra	BSP	Uday Pratap Singh
210	Dinara	JD(U)	Jai Kumar Singh	RJD	Vijay Kumar Mandal	LJP	Rajendra Prasad Singh
211	Nokha	JD(U)	Nagendra Chandravanshi	RJD	Anita Devi	LJP	Krishna Kabir
212	Dehri	BJP	Satyanarayan Singh Yadav	RJD	Phate Bahadur Singh		
213	Karakat	BJP	Rajeshwar Raj	CPI(ML)L	Arun Singh		
Arwal District
214	Arwal	BJP	Dipak Kumar Sharma	CPI(ML)L	Maha Nand Singh		
215	Kurtha	JD(U)	Satyadeo Singh	RJD	Bagi Kumar Verma	LJP	Bhuwneshwar Pathak
Jehanabad District
216	Jehanabad	JD(U)	Krishnanandan Prasad Verma	RJD	Suday Yadav	LJP	Indu Devi Kashyap
217	Ghosi	JD(U)	Rahul Kumar	CPI(ML)L	Rambali Singh Yadav	LJP	Rakesh Kumar Singh
218	Makhdumpur (SC)	HAM(S)	Devendra Manjhi	RJD	Satish Kumar		
Aurangabad District
219	Goh	BJP	Manoj Kumar Sharma	RJD	Bheem Kumar Yadav		
220	Obra	JD(U)	Sunil Kumar	RJD	Rishi Kumar	LJP	Prakash Chandra
221	Nabinagar	JD(U)	Virendra Kumar Singh	RJD	Vijay Kumar Singh (Dabloo Singh)	LJP	Vijay Kumar Singh
222	Kutumba	HAM(S)	Shravan Bhuyan	INC	Rajesh Kumar	LJP	Sarun Paswan
223	Aurangabad	BJP	Ramadhar Singh	INC	Anand Shankar Singh		
224	Rafiganj	JD(U)	Ashok Kumar Singh	RJD	Mohammad Nehaluddin	LJP	Manoj Kumar Singh
Gaya District
225	Gurua	BJP	Rajiv Nandan Dangi	RJD	Vinay Kumar		
226	Sherghati	JD(U)	Vinod Prasad Yadav	RJD	Manju Agrawal	LJP	Mukesh Kumar Yadav
227	Imamganj (SC)	HAM(S)	Jitan Ram Manjhi	RJD	Uday Narayan Choudhary	LJP	Shobha Sinha
228	Barachatti (SC)	HAM(S)	Jyoti Devi	RJD	Samata Devi	LJP	Renuka Devi
229	Bodh Gaya (SC)	BJP	Hari Manjhi	RJD	Kumar Sarvjeet		
230	Gaya Town	BJP	Prem Kumar	INC	Akhauri Onkar Nath		
231	Tikari	HAM(S)	Anil Kumar	INC	Sumant Kumar	LJP	Kamlesh Sharma
232	Belaganj	JD(U)	Abhay Kumar Sinha	RJD	Surendra Prasad Yadav	LJP	Ramashray Sharma
233	Atri	JD(U)	Manorama Devi	RJD	Ajay Yadav	LJP	Arvind Kumar Singh
234	Wazirganj	BJP	Birendra Singh	INC	Shashi Shekhar Singh		
Nawada District
235	Rajauli (SC)	BJP	Kanhaiya Kumar	RJD	Prakash Veer		
236	Hisua	BJP	Anil Singh	INC	Nitu Kumari		
237	Nawada	JD(U)	Kaushal Yadav	RJD	Vibha Devi	LJP	Shashi Bhusan Kumar
238	Gobindpur	JD(U)	Purnima Yadav	RJD	Mohammed Kamran	LJP	Ranjeet Yadav
239	Warsaliganj	BJP	Aruna Devi	INC	Satish Kumar		
Jamui District
240	Sikandra (SC)	HAM(S)	Prafulla Manjhi	INC	Sudhir Kumar	LJP	Ravishankar Paswan
241	Jamui	BJP	Shreyasi Singh	RJD	Vijay Prakash Yadav		
242	Jhajha	JD(U)	Damodar Rawat	RJD	Rajendra Yadav	LJP	Rabindra Yadav
243	Chakai	JD(U)	Sanjay Prasad	RJD	Savitri Devi	LJP	Sanjay Kumar Mandal
Source: Election Commission of India

== Surveys and polls ==
=== Seat projections ===
Polling type	Date	Polling Agency					Majority	Ref
Polling type	Date	Polling Agency	NDA	MGB	LJP	Others	Majority	Ref
Exit poll
Exit poll		Republic-Jan Ki Baat	91-117	118-138	5-8	3-5	HUNG	
Exit poll		Patriotic Voter	129	107	2	5	12	
Exit poll		News 18-Today's Chanakya	55	180	-	8	58	
Exit poll		P-Marq (Politique Marquer	123-135	104-115	0-1	0-10	8-31	
Exit poll		Times Now-CVoter	116	120	1	6	HUNG	
Exit poll		India Ahead - ETG Research	108-120	114-126	2-5	5-8	HUNG	
Exit poll		India Today/AAJ Tak-Axis My India	69-91	139-161	3-5	3-5	17-39	
Exit poll		ABP News-CVoter	104-128	108-131	1-3	4-8	HUNG	
Opinion poll
Opinion poll	23 October 2020	Patriotic Voter	133	102	8		11-21	
Opinion poll	24 October 2020	ABP-CVoter	135-159	77-98	5-13		13-37	
Opinion poll	20 October 2020	India Today-Lokniti CSDS	133-143	88-98	8-16		11-21	
Opinion poll	12 October 2020	Times Now-CVoter	160	76	7		39	
Opinion poll	25 September 2020	ABP-CVoter	141-161	64-84	13-23		20–40	

=== Vote Share ===
Polling type	Date	Polling Agency				Ref
Polling type	Date	Polling Agency	NDA	MGB	Others	Ref
Opinion poll	25 September 2020	ABP-Cvoter	44.8	33.2	22.0	
Opinion poll	20 October 2020	India Today-CSDS Lokniti	38	32	30	
Opinion poll	24 October 2020	ABP-Cvoter	43	35	22	

== Election ==
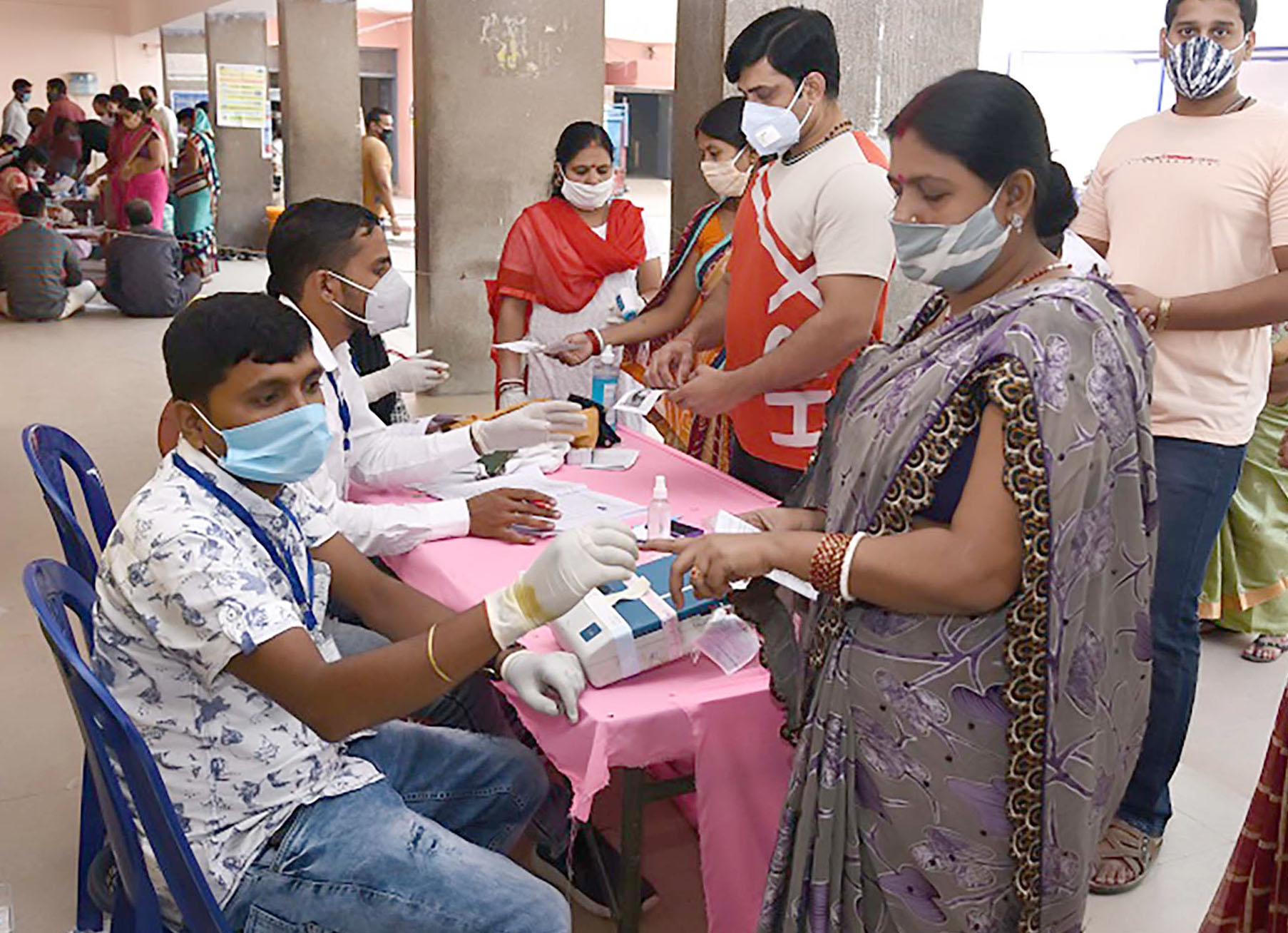
Polling official administering indelible ink to a voter, at a polling booth, during the first phase of the Bihar Assembly Election, at New Madhya Vidyalaya, in Gaya, Bihar on October 28, 2020.

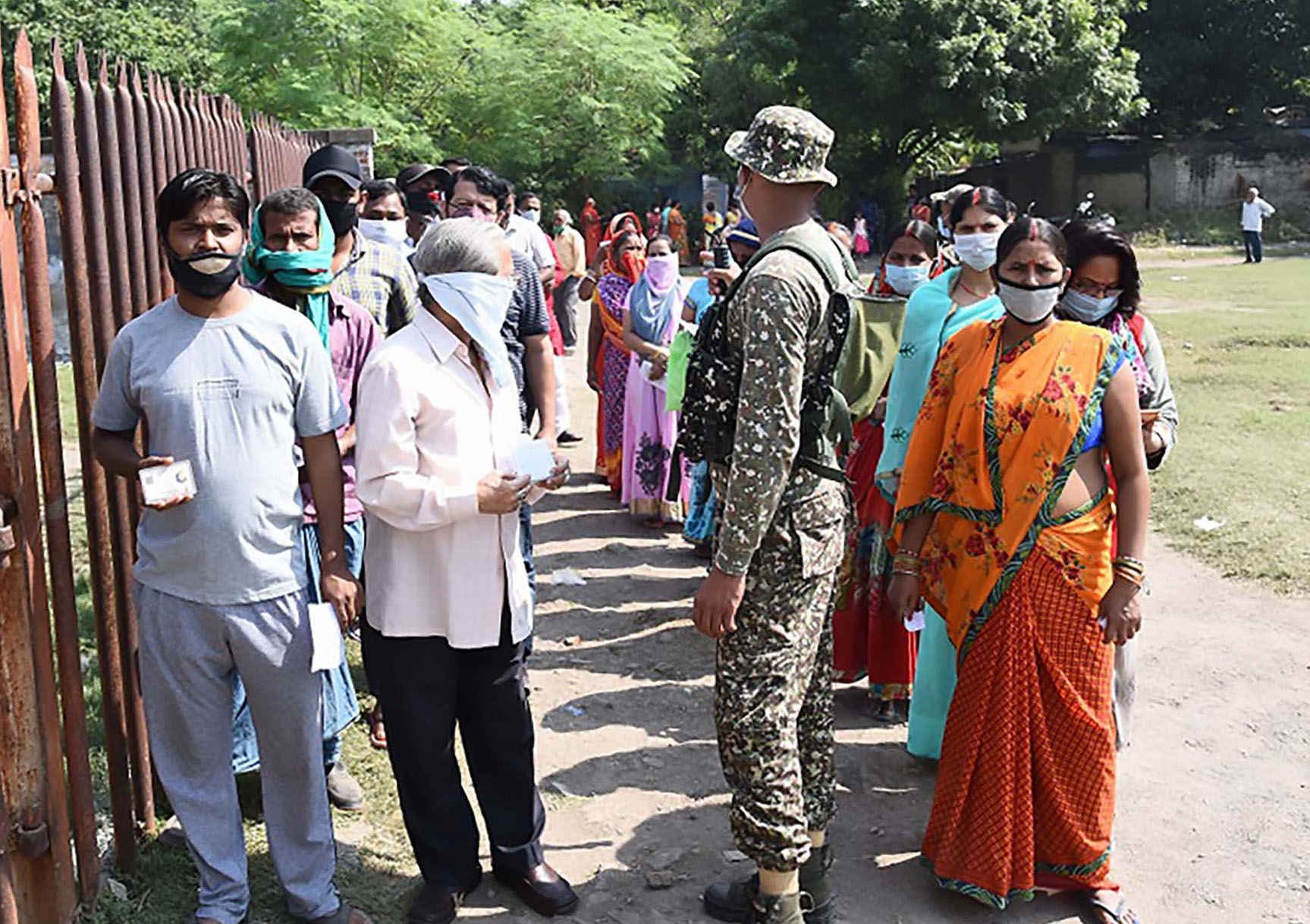
Voters standing in the queue to cast their votes, at a polling booth, during the first phase of the Bihar Assembly Election, at New Madhya Vidyalaya, in Gaya, Bihar on October 28, 2020.

The Chief Election Commissioner of India, Sunil Arora, announced on 25 September 2020 that the Bihar assembly election will be held from 28 October 2020, in three phases for 243 constituencies. Per the Election Commission of India, approximately 60 registered parties are to contest in the Bihar elections.

The elections were conducted amid the COVID-19 pandemic with the necessary guidelines issued by the Election Commission of India. The election will consist of both, virtual and physical campaigns. The authorities also passed the guidelines over limited people to be involved in the rallies. Due to COVID-19, the polling time will be increased by one hour and will now be from 7am to 6pm, except in Naxalite–Maoist insurgency affected areas. As per guidelines, maximum number of voters per polling station was reduced from 1,500 to 1,000. Arrangements were made for 7 lakh units of hand sanitisers, 46 lakh masks, 6 lakh PPE kits, 6.7 lakh face shields, and 23 lakh single use gloves.

=== Voting ===
The overall voter turnout in this election has been 57.05%, which is 0.39% more than the 56.66% in 2015 assembly polls. In these elections, 59.58% of females voted compared to a 54.68% voter turnout of males.

==== Phase 1 ====
A total of 1,066 candidates, including 952 male and 114 female, contested in the first phase of elections from different constituencies. The maximum number of candidates contesting from one constituency in the first phase was being at Gaya Town with 27 candidates and the minimum at Katoria with 5 candidates in Banka district. In the constituencies voting in the first phase of elections, approximately 2.15 crore registered electors were eligible to exercise their vote, out of which around 1.12 crore were male, 1.01 crore were female and 599 were categorised as the third gender.

The first phase of elections recorded a voter turnout of 55.68%. The male and female voter turnout for the first phase was 56.8% and 54.4% respectively. In the previous assembly election in 2015, the voter turnout was 54.94% for these constituencies.

==== Phase 2 ====
In the second phase of elections, 1463 candidates contested the elections, of which 1315 candidates were male, 147 candidates were female and 1 candidate belonged to the transgender community.

The elections was held on 3 November. Voter turnout for the 2nd phase was over 55.7%.

==== Phase 3 ====
In the third phase of elections, 1094 male candidates and 110 female candidates contested the elections for 78 Seats, out of a total of 23.5 Million eligible voters for this phase total of 12.3 Million were Male and 11.2 Million were female voters.

The elections were held on 7 November 2020 and the total Voting turnout was recorded 59.94%, which was highest among all three phases.

=== Incidents ===
On 27 October 2020 a day before the first phase of the election, three improvised explosive devices (IEDs) were recovered and diffused from two different places in Imamganj area of Gaya district.

== Results ==
=== Summary ===
125	110	8
NDA	MGB	Others

NDA secured a total of 125 seats (37.26% votes) while MGB won 110 seats (37.23% votes). GDSF got 6 seats, LJP & others won a seat each. The results surprised many analysts and polling agencies that predicted MGB to win. Only agency to correctly predict the Bihar election results was Politique Marquer that had predicted a narrow majority for NDA. Rashtriya Janata Dal won in 75 constituencies and became the largest political party in the Legislative Assembly, however its numbers reduced compared to previous election. The Bharatiya Janata Party won 74 seats and was the biggest gainer in terms of number of MLAs elected as it added more than 30% to its seat count compared to the last election. The Janata Dal (United) and Indian National Congress won in 43 and 19 constituencies respectively and dropped the most seats compared to the previous election. The All India Majlis-e-Ittehadul Muslimeen (AIMIM) also made inroads in the state winning 5 seats. All the 5 MLAs of AIMIM were elected from constituencies in the Seemanchal region of the State. The Communist parties also gained in these elections. The Communist Party of India (Marxist–Leninist) (Liberation) won 12 seats, whereas the Communist Party of India (Marxist) and Communist Party of India won 2 seats each. The Vikassheel Insaan Party which contested the Assembly elections for the first time won 4 seats. Sumit Kumar Singh was the only Independent candidate to win as a MLA.

Though the LJP could win only one seat (Matihani) on its own, but it caused much harm to the NDA. Of the 54 seats where it dented margins, JD(U) was hurt the most. Data shows that on 25 seats, where JD(U) came second, LJP had more votes than the victory margin.

The constituencies with higher female turnout than male, the NDA was in lead. Out of the 125 seats that NDA won, 99 were constituencies where female turnout was more than their male counterparts. About 20% of the seats, the margin of victory was less than 2.5% of the votes polled. The NDA won 21 seats with a less than 2.5% vote margin, while the Mahagathbandhan won in 22 such seats.

Map displaying constituencies won by parties

Alliance	Party	Popular vote			Seats		
Alliance	Party	Votes	%	±pp	Contested	Won	+/−
NDA							
NDA	Bharatiya Janata Party	8,202,067	19.46	▼4.96	110	74	▲21
NDA	Janata Dal (United)	6,485,179	15.39	▼1.44	115	43	▼28
NDA	Vikassheel Insaan Party	639,840	1.52	▲1.52	11	4	▲4
NDA	Hindustani Awam Morcha	375,564	0.89	▼1.41	7	4	▲3
NDA	Total	15,702,650	37.26	▼7.84	243	125	Steady
MGB							
MGB	Rashtriya Janata Dal	9,738,855	23.11	▲4.79	144	75	▼5
MGB	Indian National Congress	3,995,319	9.48	▲2.82	70	19	▼8
MGB	Communist Party of India (ML) Liberation	1,333,682	3.16	▲1.66	19	12	▲9
MGB	Communist Party of India	349,489	0.83	▼0.57	6	2	▲2
MGB	Communist Party of India (Marxist)	274,155	0.65	▲0.05	4	2	▲2
MGB	Total	15,691,500	37.23	▲8.62	243	110	Steady
GDSF							
GDSF	All India Majlis-e-Ittehadul Muslimeen	523,279	1.24	▲1.03	20	5	▲5
GDSF	Bahujan Samaj Party	628,961	1.49	▼0.60	78	1	▲1
GDSF	Rashtriya Lok Samta Party	744,221	1.77	▼0.82	99	0	▼2
GDSF	Total	1,896,461	4.50	▼0.39	197	6	▲4
None	Lok Janshakti Party	2,383,457	5.66	▲0.77	135	1	▼1
None	Independents	3,641,362	8.64	▼0.76	1299	1	▼3
None	NOTA	706,252	1.68	▼0.82	Steady	Steady	Steady
Total		42,142,828	100.00			243	
Valid votes		42,142,828	99.88				
Invalid votes		51,222	0.12				
Votes cast / Turnout		42,194,050	57.29				
Abstentions		31,453,610	42.71				
Registered voters		73,647,660					

=== Results by District Wise ===
In districts adjoining Uttar Pradesh, the BJP performed better than the Mahagathbandhan, however JDU's seats declined. The NDA won in majority of the constituencies in the Champaran region.

District	Seats			
District	Seats	NDA	MGB	OTH
West Champaran	9	8	1	—N/a
East Champaran	12	9	3	—N/a
Sheohar	1	—N/a	1	—N/a
Sitamarhi	8	6	2	—N/a
Madhubani	10	8	2	—N/a
Supaul	5	5	—N/a	—N/a
Araria	6	4	1	1
Kishanganj	4	—N/a	2	2
Purnia	7	4	1	2
Katihar	7	4	3	—N/a
Madhepura	4	2	2	—N/a
Saharsa	4	3	1	—N/a
Darbhanga	10	9	1	—N/a
Muzaffarpur	11	6	5	—N/a
Gopalganj	6	4	2	—N/a
Siwan	8	2	6	—N/a
Saran	10	3	7	—N/a
Vaishali	8	4	4	—N/a
Samastipur	10	5	5	—N/a
Begusarai	7	2	4	1
Khagaria	4	2	2	—N/a
Bhagalpur	7	5	2	—N/a
Banka	5	4	1	—N/a
Munger	3	2	1	—N/a
Lakhisarai	2	1	1	—N/a
Sheikhpura	2	1	1	—N/a
Nalanda	7	6	1	—N/a
Patna	14	5	9	—N/a
Bhojpur	7	2	5	—N/a
Buxar	4	—N/a	4	—N/a
Kaimur	4	—N/a	3	1
Rohtas	7	—N/a	7	—N/a
Arwal	2	—N/a	2	—N/a
Jehanabad	3	—N/a	3	—N/a
Aurangabad	6	—N/a	6	—N/a
Gaya	10	5	5	—N/a
Nawada	5	1	4	—N/a
Jamui	4	3	—N/a	1
Total	243	125	110	8

=== Results by Constituency ===
District	Constituency		Winner				Runner Up				Margin	%
District	#	Name (Note: SC and ST indicate constituencies reserved for Scheduled Castes and Scheduled Tribes respectively.)	Candidate	Party	Votes	%	Candidate	Party	Votes	%	Margin	%
West; Champaran	1	Valmiki Nagar	Dhirendra Singh	JD(U)	74,906	38.32	Rajesh Singh	INC	53,321	27.28	21,585	11.04
West; Champaran	2	Ramnagar (SC)	Bhagirathi Devi	BJP	75,423	39.57	Rajesh Ram	INC	59,627	31.28	15,796	8.29
West; Champaran	3	Narkatiaganj	Rashmi Varma	BJP	75,484	45.85	Vinay Varma	INC	54,350	33.02	21,134	12.83
West; Champaran	4	Bagaha	Ram Singh	BJP	90,013	49.51	Jayesh M. Singh	INC	59,993	33.00	30,020	16.51
West; Champaran	5	Lauriya	Vinay Bihari	BJP	77,927	49.48	Shambhu Tiwari	RJD	48,923	31.06	29,004	18.42
West; Champaran	6	Nautan	Narayan Prasad	BJP	78,657	46.97	Sheikh Md. Kamran	INC	52,761	31.51	25,896	15.46
West; Champaran	7	Chanpatia	Umakant Singh	BJP	83,828	47.69	Abhishek Ranjan	INC	70,359	40.03	13,469	7.66
West; Champaran	8	Bettiah	Renu Devi	BJP	84,496	52.83	Madan Tiwari	INC	66,417	41.53	18,079	11.30
West; Champaran	9	Sikta	Birendra Gupta	CPI(ML)	49,075	28.85	Dilip Varma	IND	46,773	27.50	2,302	1.35
East; Champaran	10	Raxaul	Pramod Sinha	BJP	80,979	45.60	Rambabu Yadav	INC	44,056	24.81	36,923	20.79
East; Champaran	11	Sugauli	Shashi Singh	RJD	65,267	38.26	Ramchandra Sahani	VIP	61,820	36.24	3,447	2.02
East; Champaran	12	Narkatia	Shamim Ahmad	RJD	85,562	46.69	Shyam Bihari Prasad	JD(U)	57,771	31.53	27,791	15.16
East; Champaran	13	Harsidhi (SC)	Krishnanandan Paswan	BJP	84,615	49.71	Nagendra Kumar	RJD	68,930	40.50	15,685	9.21
East; Champaran	14	Govindganj	Sunil Tiwari	BJP	65,716	43.14	Brajesh Kumar	INC	37,936	24.90	27,780	18.24
East; Champaran	15	Kesaria	Shalini Mishra	JD(U)	40,219	26.59	Santosh Kushwha	RJD	30,992	20.49	9,227	6.10
East; Champaran	16	Kalyanpur	Manoj Yadav	RJD	72,819	45.35	Sachindra Singh	BJP	71,626	44.61	1,193	0.74
East; Champaran	17	Pipra	Shyambabu Yadav	BJP	88,587	44.18	Rajmangal Prasad	CPI(M)	80,410	40.10	8,177	4.08
East; Champaran	18	Madhuban	Rana Randhir	BJP	73,179	47.69	Madan Prasad	RJD	67,301	43.86	5,878	3.83
East; Champaran	19	Motihari	Pramod Kumar	BJP	92,733	49.44	Om Prakash Ch.	RJD	78,088	41.63	14,645	7.81
East; Champaran	20	Chiraiya	Lal Babu Prasad	BJP	62,904	37.62	Achchhelal Prasad	RJD	46,030	27.53	16,874	10.09
East; Champaran	21	Dhaka	Pawan Jaiswal	BJP	99,792	48.01	Faisal Rahman	RJD	89,678	43.15	10,114	4.86
Sheohar	22	Sheohar	Chetan Anand	RJD	73,143	42.69	Sharfuddin	JD(U)	36,457	21.28	36,686	21.41
Sitamarhi	23	Riga	Moti Lal Prasad	BJP	95,226	53.07	Amit Kumar	INC	62,731	34.96	32,495	18.11
Sitamarhi	24	Bathnaha (SC)	Anil Kumar	BJP	92,648	54.15	Sanjay Ram	INC	45,830	26.79	46,818	27.36
Sitamarhi	25	Parihar	Gayatri Devi	BJP	73,420	42.52	Ritu Jaiswal	RJD	71,851	41.61	1,569	0.91
Sitamarhi	26	Sursand	Dilip Ray	JD(U)	67,193	38.63	Syed Abu Dojana	RJD	58,317	33.53	8,876	5.10
Sitamarhi	27	Bajpatti	Mukesh Yadav	RJD	71,483	40.21	Ranju Geeta	JD(U)	68,779	38.69	2,704	1.52
Sitamarhi	28	Sitamarhi	Mithilesh Kumar	BJP	90,236	49.90	Sunil Kushwaha	RJD	78,761	43.55	11,475	6.35
Sitamarhi	29	Runnisaidpur	Pankaj Mishra	JD(U)	73,205	47.96	Mangita Devi	RJD	48,576	31.83	24,629	16.13
Sitamarhi	30	Belsand	Sanjay Gupta	RJD	50,001	35.82	Sunita Singh	JD(U)	36,070	25.84	13,931	9.98
Madhubani	31	Harlakhi	Sudhanshu Shekhar	JD(U)	60,393	36.10	Ram Naresh Pandey	CPI	42,800	25.58	17,593	10.52
Madhubani	32	Benipatti	Vinod Jha	BJP	78,862	50.63	Bhawana Jha	INC	46,210	29.67	32,652	20.96
Madhubani	33	Khajauli	Arun Prasad	BJP	83,161	44.51	Sitaram Yadav	RJD	60,472	32.37	22,689	12.14
Madhubani	34	Babubarhi	Mina Kumari	JD(U)	77,367	40.39	Umakant Yadav	RJD	65,879	34.39	11,488	6.00
Madhubani	35	Bisfi	Haribhushan Thakur	BJP	86,787	48.43	Faiyaz Ahmad	RJD	76,505	42.70	10,282	5.73
Madhubani	36	Madhubani	Samir Kumar Mahaseth	RJD	71,332	38.00	Suman Mahaseth	VIP	64,518	34.37	6,814	3.63
Madhubani	37	Rajnagar (SC)	Ram Prit	BJP	89,459	51.42	Ramawatar Paswan	RJD	70,338	40.43	19,121	10.99
Madhubani	38	Jhanjharpur	Nitish Mishra	BJP	94,854	52.47	Ram Narayan Yadav	CPI	53,066	29.36	41,788	23.11
Madhubani	39	Phulparas	Sheela Kumari	JD(U)	75,116	41.26	Kripanath Pathak	INC	64,150	35.24	10,966	6.02
Madhubani	40	Laukaha	Bharat Mandal	RJD	78,523	37.57	Lakshmeshwar Ray	JD(U)	68,446	32.75	10,077	4.82
Supaul	41	Nirmali	Aniruddha Yadav	JD(U)	92,439	49.33	Yadubansh Yadav	RJD	48,517	25.89	43,922	23.44
Supaul	42	Pipra	Rambilash Kamat	JD(U)	82,388	45.35	Vishwa Mohan Kumar	RJD	63,143	34.76	19,245	10.59
Supaul	43	Supaul	Bijendra Yadav	JD(U)	86,174	50.20	Minnatullah; Rahmani	INC	58,075	33.83	28,099	16.37
Supaul	44	Triveniganj (SC)	Veena Bharti	JD(U)	79,458	44.84	Santosh Kumar	RJD	76,427	43.13	3,031	1.71
Supaul	45	Chhatapur	Neeraj Kumar Singh	BJP	93,755	46.39	Vipin Kumar Singh	RJD	73,120	36.18	20,635	10.21
Araria	46	Narpatganj	Jai Prakash Yadav	BJP	98,397	49.06	Anil Kumar Yadav	RJD	69,787	34.79	28,610	14.27
Araria	47	Raniganj (SC)	Achmit Rishidev	JD(U)	81,901	44.12	Avinash Manglam	RJD	79,597	42.88	2,304	1.24
Araria	48	Forbesganj	Vidya Sagar Keshri	BJP	1,02,212	49.53	Zakir Hussain Khan	INC	82,510	39.98	19,702	9.55
Araria	49	Araria	Abidur Rahman	INC	1,03,054	54.84	Shagufta Azim	JD(U)	55,118	29.33	47,936	25.51
Araria	50	Jokihat	Shahnawaz	AIMIM	59,596	34.22	Sarfaraz Alam	RJD	52,213	29.98	7,383	4.24
Araria	51	Sikti	Vijay Kumar Mandal	BJP	84,128	46.92	Shatrughan Suman	RJD	70,518	39.33	13,610	7.59
Kishanganj	52	Bahadurganj	Md. Anzar Nayeemi	AIMIM	85,855	49.77	Lakhan Lal Pandit	VIP	40,640	23.56	45,215	26.21
Kishanganj	53	Thakurganj	Saud Alam	RJD	79,909	41.48	Gopal Kumar; Agarwal	IND	56,022	29.08	23,887	12.40
Kishanganj	54	Kishanganj	Ijaharul Husain	INC	61,078	34.20	Sweety Singh	BJP	59,697	33.42	1,381	0.78
Kishanganj	55	Kochadhaman	Md. Izhar Asfi	AIMIM	79,893	49.45	Mujahid Alam	JD(U)	43,750	27.08	36,143	22.37
Purnia	56	Amour	Akhtarul Iman	AIMIM	94,459	51.17	Saba Zafar	JD(U)	41,944	22.72	52,515	28.45
Purnia	57	Baisi	Ruknuddin Ahmad	AIMIM	68,416	38.27	Vinod Kumar	BJP	52,043	29.11	16,373	9.16
Purnia	58	Kasba	Md. Afaque Alam	INC	77,410	41.12	Pradeep Kumar Das	LJP	60,132	31.94	17,278	9.18
Purnia	59	Banmankhi (SC)	Krishna Kumar Rishi	BJP	93,594	51.74	Upendra Sharma	RJD	65,851	36.41	27,743	15.33
Purnia	60	Rupauli	Bima Bharti	JD(U)	64,324	34.52	Shankar Singh	LJP	44,994	24.15	19,330	10.37
Purnia	61	Dhamdaha	Leshi Singh	JD(U)	97,057	48.50	Dilip Kumar Yadav	RJD	63,463	31.71	33,594	16.79
Purnia	62	Purnia	Vijay Kumar Khemka	BJP	97,757	52.78	Indu Sinha	INC	65,603	35.42	32,154	17.36
Katihar	63	Katihar	Tarkishore Prasad	BJP	82,669	48.47	Ram Mahto	RJD	72,150	42.30	10,519	6.17
Katihar	64	Kadwa	Shakeel Ahmad Khan	INC	71,267	42.00	Chandra B. Thakur	LJP	38,865	22.90	32,402	19.10
Katihar	65	Balrampur	Mahboob Alam	CPI(ML)	1,04,489	51.11	Barun Kumar Jha	VIP	50,892	24.89	53,597	26.22
Katihar	66	Pranpur	Nisha Singh	BJP	79,974	39.97	Tauquir Alam	INC	77,002	38.48	2,972	1.49
Katihar	67	Manihari (ST)	Manohar Prasad Singh	INC	83,032	45.81	Shambhu Suman	JD(U)	61,823	34.11	21,209	11.70
Katihar	68	Barari	Bijay Singh	JD(U)	81,752	44.71	Neeraj Kumar	RJD	71,314	39.00	10,438	5.71
Katihar	69	Korha (SC)	Kavita Devi	BJP	1,04,625	53.31	Punam Paswan	INC	75,682	38.56	28,943	14.75
Madhepura	70	Alamnagar	Narendra Yadav	JD(U)	1,02,517	48.17	Nabin Kumar	RJD	73,837	34.69	28,680	13.48
Madhepura	71	Bihariganj	Niranjan Mehta	JD(U)	81,531	43.63	Subhashini Bundela	INC	62,820	33.61	18,711	10.02
Madhepura	72	Singheshwar (SC)	Chandrahas Chaupal	RJD	86,181	45.13	Ramesh Rishidev	JD(U)	80,608	42.21	5,573	2.92
Madhepura	73	Madhepura	Chandra Shekhar	RJD	81,116	39.52	Nikhil Mandal	JD(U)	65,070	31.70	16,046	7.82
Saharsa	74	Sonbarsha (SC)	Ratnesh Sada	JD(U)	67,678	40.20	Tarni Rishideo	INC	54,212	32.20	13,466	8.00
Saharsa	75	Saharsa	Alok Ranjan	BJP	1,03,538	45.59	Lovely Anand	RJD	83,859	36.93	19,679	8.66
Saharsa	76	Simri Bakhtiarpur	Yusuf Salahuddin	RJD	75,684	38.48	Mukesh Sahani	VIP	73,925	37.58	1,759	0.90
Saharsa	77	Mahishi	Gunjeshwar Sah	JD(U)	66,316	37.83	Gautam Krishna	RJD	64,686	36.90	1,630	0.93
Darbhanga	78	Kusheshwar; Asthan (SC)	Shashibhushan Hajari	JD(U)	53,980	39.55	Dr. Ashok Kumar	INC	46,758	34.26	7,222	5.29
Darbhanga	79	Gaura Bauram	Swarna Singh	VIP	59,538	41.26	Afzal Ali Khan	RJD	52,258	36.21	7,280	5.05
Darbhanga	80	Benipur	Binay Choudhary	JD(U)	61,416	37.58	Mithilesh; Choudhary	INC	54,826	33.55	6,590	4.03
Darbhanga	81	Alinagar	Mishri Lal Yadav	VIP	61,082	38.62	Binod Mishra	RJD	57,981	36.66	3,101	1.96
Darbhanga	82	Darbhanga Rural	Lalit Kumar Yadav	RJD	64,929	41.26	Faraz Fatmi	JD(U)	62,788	39.90	2,141	1.36
Darbhanga	83	Darbhanga	Sanjay Saraogi	BJP	84,144	49.32	Amar Nath Gami	RJD	73,505	43.08	10,639	6.24
Darbhanga	84	Hayaghat	Ram Chandra Prasad	BJP	67,030	46.86	Bhola Yadav	RJD	56,778	39.69	10,252	7.17
Darbhanga	85	Bahadurpur	Madan Sahni	JD(U)	68,538	38.50	Ramesh Choudhary	RJD	65,909	37.03	2,629	1.47
Darbhanga	86	Keoti	Murari Mohan Jha	BJP	76,372	46.75	Abdul Bari Siddiqui	RJD	71,246	43.61	5,126	3.14
Darbhanga	87	Jale	Jibesh Kumar	BJP	87,376	51.66	Maskoor Usmani	INC	65,580	38.78	21,796	12.88
Muzaffarpur	88	Gaighat	Niranjan Roy	RJD	59,778	32.92	Maheshwar Yadav	JD(U)	52,212	28.75	7,566	4.17
Muzaffarpur	89	Aurai	Ram Surat Kumar	BJP	90,479	52.33	Md. Aftab Alam	CPI(ML)	42,613	24.65	47,866	27.68
Muzaffarpur	90	Minapur	Rajeev Kumar	RJD	60,018	33.51	Manoj Kumar	JD(U)	44,506	24.85	15,512	8.66
Muzaffarpur	91	Bochaha (SC)	Musafir Paswan	VIP	77,837	42.62	Ramai Ram	RJD	66,569	36.45	11,268	6.17
Muzaffarpur	92	Sakra (SC)	Ashok Kumar; Chodhary	JD(U)	67,265	40.25	Umesh Kumar Ram	INC	65,728	39.33	1,537	0.92
Muzaffarpur	93	Kurhani	Anil Kumar Sahni	RJD	78,549	40.23	Kedar Prasad Gupta	BJP	77,837	39.86	712	0.37
Muzaffarpur	94	Muzaffarpur	Bijendra Chaudhary	INC	81,871	48.16	Suresh Sharma	BJP	75,545	44.44	6,326	3.72
Muzaffarpur	95	Kanti	Md. Israil Mansuri	RJD	64,458	32.89	Ajit Kumar	IND	54,144	27.63	10,314	5.26
Muzaffarpur	96	Baruraj	Arun Kumar Singh	BJP	87,407	49.47	Nand Kumar Rai	RJD	43,753	24.76	43,654	24.71
Muzaffarpur	97	Paroo	Ashok Kumar; Singh	BJP	77,392	40.92	Shankar Prasad	IND	62,694	33.15	14,698	7.77
Muzaffarpur	98	Sahebganj	Raju Kumar Singh	VIP	81,203	44.25	Ramvichar Rai	RJD	65,870	35.90	15,333	8.35
Gopalganj	99	Baikunthpur	Prem Shankar Ps.	RJD	67,807	37.01	Mithilesh Tiwari	BJP	56,694	30.95	11,113	6.06
Gopalganj	100	Barauli	Rampravesh Rai	BJP	81,956	46.55	Reyazul Haque Raju	RJD	67,801	38.51	14,155	8.04
Gopalganj	101	Gopalganj	Subash Singh	BJP	77,791	43.49	Anirudh Prasad	BSP	41,039	22.94	36,752	20.55
Gopalganj	102	Kuchaikote	Amrendra Pandey	JD(U)	74,359	41.19	Kali Prasad Pandey	INC	53,729	29.76	20,630	11.43
Gopalganj	103	Bhorey (SC)	Sunil Kumar	JD(U)	74,067	40.50	Jitendra Paswan	CPI(ML)	73,605	40.25	462	0.25
Gopalganj	104	Hathua	Rajesh Kumar Singh	RJD	86,731	49.84	Ramsewak Singh	JD(U)	56,204	32.29	30,527	17.55
Siwan	105	Siwan	Awadh Bihari; Chaudhary	RJD	76,785	45.30	Om Prakash Yadav	BJP	74,812	44.13	1,973	1.17
Siwan	106	Ziradei	Amarjeet Kushwaha	CPI(ML)	69,442	48.11	Kamala Singh	JD(U)	43,932	30.44	25,510	17.67
Siwan	107	Darauli (SC)	Satyadeo Ram	CPI(ML)	81,067	50.50	Ramayan Manjhi	BJP	68,948	42.95	12,119	7.55
Siwan	108	Raghunathpur	Harishankar Yadav	RJD	67,757	42.66	Manoj Kumar Singh	LJP	49,792	31.35	17,965	11.31
Siwan	109	Daraundha	Karnjeet Singh	BJP	71,934	44.09	Amarnath Yadav	CPI(ML)	60,614	37.15	11,320	6.94
Siwan	110	Barharia	Bachcha Pandey	RJD	71,793	41.62	Shyambahadur Singh	JD(U)	68,234	39.55	3,559	2.07
Siwan	111	Goriakothi	Devesh Kant Singh	BJP	87,368	45.66	Nutan Devi	RJD	75,477	39.45	11,891	6.21
Siwan	112	Maharajganj	Vijay Shanker; Dubey	INC	48,825	30.07	Hem Narayan Sah	JD(U)	46,849	28.86	1,976	1.21
Saran	113	Ekma	Srikant Yadav	RJD	53,875	35.05	Sita Devi	JD(U)	39,948	25.99	13,927	9.06
Saran	114	Manjhi	Dr. Satyendra Yadav	CPI(M)	59,324	37.56	Rana Pratap Singh	IND	33,938	21.49	25,386	16.07
Saran	115	Baniapur	Kedar Nath Singh	RJD	65,194	38.74	Virendra Kumar Ojha	VIP	37,405	22.23	27,789	16.51
Saran	116	Taraiya	Janak Singh	BJP	53,430	32.15	Sipahi Lal Mahto	RJD	42,123	25.35	11,307	6.80
Saran	117	Marhaura	Jitendra Kumar Ray	RJD	59,812	39.44	Altaf Alam	JD(U)	48,427	31.93	11,385	7.51
Saran	118	Chapra	Dr. C. N. Gupta	BJP	75,710	44.97	Randhir Kumar Singh	RJD	68,939	40.95	6,771	4.02
Saran	119	Garkha (SC)	Surendra Ram	RJD	83,412	47.21	Gyanchand Manjhi	BJP	73,475	41.59	9,937	5.62
Saran	120	Amnour	Krishan Kumar Mantoo	BJP	63,316	42.29	Sunil Kumar	RJD	59,635	39.83	3,681	2.46
Saran	121	Parsa	Chhote Lal Ray	RJD	68,316	44.36	Chandrika Roy	JD(U)	51,023	33.13	17,293	11.23
Saran	122	Sonepur	Dr. Ramanuj Prasad	RJD	73,247	43.11	Vinay Kumar Singh	BJP	66,561	39.18	6,686	3.93
Vaishali	123	Hajipur	Awadhesh Singh	BJP	85,552	44.55	Deo Kumar; Chaurasia	RJD	82,562	42.99	2,990	1.56
Vaishali	124	Lalganj	Sanjay Kumar Singh	BJP	70,750	36.88	Rakesh Kumar	INC	44,451	23.17	26,299	13.71
Vaishali	125	Vaishali	Siddharth Patel	JD(U)	69,780	35.96	Sanjeev Singh	INC	62,367	32.14	7,413	3.82
Vaishali	126	Mahua	Mukesh Raushan	RJD	62,747	36.48	Ashma Parveen	JD(U)	48,977	28.47	13,770	8.01
Vaishali	127	Rajapakar (SC)	Pratima Kumari	INC	54,299	35.67	Mahendra Ram	JD(U)	52,503	34.49	1,796	1.18
Vaishali	128	Raghopur	Tejashwi Prasad Yadav	RJD	97,404	48.74	Satish Kumar	BJP	59,230	29.64	38,174	19.10
Vaishali	129	Mahnar	Bina Singh	RJD	61,721	37.34	Umesh Kushwaha	JD(U)	53,774	32.54	7,947	4.80
Vaishali	130	Patepur (SC)	Lakhendra Raushan	BJP	86,509	52.15	Shiv Chandra Ram	RJD	60,670	36.57	25,839	15.58
Samastipur	131	Kalyanpur (SC)	Maheshwar Hazari	JD(U)	72,279	38.46	Ranjeet Kumar Ram	CPI(ML)	62,028	33.00	10,251	5.46
Samastipur	132	Warisnagar	Ashok Kumar	JD(U)	68,356	35.97	Phoolbabu Singh	CPI(ML)	54,555	28.71	13,801	7.26
Samastipur	133	Samastipur	Akhtarul Islam Shahin	RJD	68,507	41.21	Ashwamedh Devi	JD(U)	63,793	38.37	4,714	2.84
Samastipur	134	Ujiarpur	Alok Kumar Mehta	RJD	90,601	48.81	Sheel Kumar Roy	BJP	67,333	36.27	23,268	12.54
Samastipur	135	Morwa	Ranvijay Sahu	RJD	59,554	37.06	Vidya Sagar Nishad	JD(U)	48,883	30.42	10,671	6.64
Samastipur	136	Sarairanjan	Vijay Kumar; Choudhary	JD(U)	72,666	42.48	Arbind Kumar Sahni	RJD	69,042	40.36	3,624	2.12
Samastipur	137	Mohiuddinnagar	Rajesh Kumar Singh	BJP	70,385	47.51	Ejya Yadav	RJD	55,271	37.31	15,114	10.20
Samastipur	138	Bibhutipur	Ajay Kumar	CPI(M)	73,822	45.00	Ram Balak Singh	JD(U)	33,326	20.31	40,496	24.69
Samastipur	139	Rosera (SC)	Birendra Kumar	BJP	87,163	47.93	Nagendra Kumar; Vikal	INC	51,419	28.27	35,744	19.66
Samastipur	140	Hasanpur	Tej Pratap Yadav	RJD	80,991	47.27	Raj Kumar Ray	JD(U)	59,852	34.93	21,139	12.34
Begusarai	141	Cheria Bariarpur	Raj Vanshi Mahto	RJD	68,635	45.22	Km. Manju Varma	JD(U)	27,738	18.27	40,897	26.95
Begusarai	142	Bachhwara	Surendra Mehata	BJP	54,738	30.21	Abdhesh Kumar; Rai	CPI	54,254	29.94	484	0.27
Begusarai	143	Teghra	Ram Ratan Singh	CPI	85,229	49.80	Birendra Kumar	JD(U)	37,250	21.77	47,979	28.03
Begusarai	144	Matihani	Raj Kumar Singh	LJP	61,364	29.64	Narendra Singh	JD(U)	61,031	29.48	333	0.16
Begusarai	145	Sahebpur Kamal	Satanand Sambuddha	RJD	64,888	41.45	Shashikant Kumar	JD(U)	50,663	32.36	14,225	9.09
Begusarai	146	Begusarai	Kundan Kumar	BJP	74,217	39.66	Amita Bhushan	INC	69,663	37.23	4,554	2.43
Begusarai	147	Bakhri (SC)	Suryakant Paswan	CPI	72,177	44.14	Ramshankar Paswan	BJP	71,400	43.67	777	0.47
Khagaria	148	Alauli (SC)	Ramvriksh Sada	RJD	47,183	32.69	Sadhna Devi	JD(U)	44,410	30.77	2,773	1.92
Khagaria	149	Khagaria	Chhatrapati Yadav	INC	46,980	31.14	Poonam Devi Yadav	JD(U)	43,980	29.15	3,000	1.99
Khagaria	150	Beldaur	Panna Lal Patel	JD(U)	56,541	31.95	Chandan Kumar	INC	51,433	29.06	5,108	2.89
Khagaria	151	Parbatta	Sanjeev Kumar	JD(U)	77,226	41.61	Digambar Pd. Tiwary	RJD	76,275	41.10	951	0.51
Bhagalpur	152	Bihpur	Kumar Shailendra	BJP	72,938	48.53	Shailesh Kumar	RJD	66,809	44.45	6,129	4.08
Bhagalpur	153	Gopalpur	Narendra Niraj	JD(U)	75,533	46.39	Shailesh Kumar	RJD	51,072	31.37	24,461	15.02
Bhagalpur	154	Pirpainti (SC)	Lalan Kumar	BJP	96,229	48.54	Ram Vilash Paswan	RJD	69,210	34.91	27,019	13.63
Bhagalpur	155	Kahalgaon	Pawan Kumar Yadav	BJP	1,15,538	56.23	Shubhanand Mukesh	INC	72,645	35.36	42,893	20.87
Bhagalpur	156	Bhagalpur	Ajit Sharma	INC	65,502	40.52	Rohit Pandey	BJP	64,389	39.83	1,113	0.69
Bhagalpur	157	Sultanganj	Lalit Narayan Mandal	JD(U)	72,823	42.58	Lalan Kumar	INC	61,258	35.82	11,565	6.76
Bhagalpur	158	Nathnagar	Ali Ashraf Siddiqui	RJD	78,832	40.41	Lakshmi Kant; Mandal	JD(U)	71,076	36.44	7,756	3.97
Banka	159	Amarpur	Jayant Raj	JD(U)	54,308	33.13	Jitendra Singh	INC	51,194	31.23	3,114	1.90
Banka	160	Dhauraiya (SC)	Bhudeo Choudhary	RJD	79,324	43.86	Manish Kumar	JD(U)	76,264	42.17	3,060	1.69
Banka	161	Banka	Ram Narayan Mandal	BJP	69,762	43.80	Javed Iqbal Ansari	RJD	52,934	33.24	16,828	10.56
Banka	162	Katoria (ST)	Dr. Nikki Hembrom	BJP	74,785	47.01	Sweety Hembram	RJD	68,364	42.98	6,421	4.03
Banka	163	Belhar	Manoj Yadav	JD(U)	73,589	40.16	Ramdeo Yadav	RJD	71,116	38.81	2,473	1.35
Munger	164	Tarapur	Mewa Lal Choudhary	JD(U)	64,468	36.93	Divya Prakash	RJD	57,243	32.80	7,225	4.13
Munger	165	Munger	Pranav Kumar	BJP	75,573	45.74	Avinash Kumar	RJD	74,329	44.99	1,244	0.75
Munger	166	Jamalpur	Ajay Kumar Singh	INC	57,196	37.65	Shailesh Kumar	JD(U)	52,764	34.73	4,432	2.92
Lakhisarai	167	Surajgarha	Prahlad Yadav	RJD	62,306	32.82	Ramanand Mandal	JD(U)	52,717	27.77	9,589	5.05
Lakhisarai	168	Lakhisarai	Vijay Kumar Sinha	BJP	74,212	38.20	Amaresh Kumar	INC	63,729	32.80	10,483	5.40
Sheikhpura	169	Sheikhpura	Vijay Kumar	RJD	56,365	39.02	Randhir Kumar Soni	JD(U)	50,249	34.78	6,116	4.24
Sheikhpura	170	Barbigha	Sudarshan Kumar	JD(U)	39,878	33.19	Gajanand Shahi	INC	39,765	33.09	113	0.10
Nalanda	171	Asthawan	Jitendra Kumar	JD(U)	51,525	35.75	Anil Kumar	RJD	39,925	27.70	11,600	8.05
Nalanda	172	Biharsharif	Dr. Sunil Kumar	BJP	81,888	44.55	Sunil Kumar	RJD	66,786	36.34	15,102	8.21
Nalanda	173	Rajgir (SC)	Kaushal Kishore	JD(U)	67,191	42.58	Ravi Joyti Kumar	INC	51,143	32.41	16,048	10.17
Nalanda	174	Islampur	Rakesh Kumar; Roushan	RJD	68,088	41.65	Chandra Sen Prasad	JD(U)	64,390	39.39	3,698	2.26
Nalanda	175	Hilsa	Krishnamurari Sharan	JD(U)	61,848	37.35	Atri Muni	RJD	61,836	37.35	12	0.00
Nalanda	176	Nalanda	Shrawon Kumar	JD(U)	66,066	38.97	Kaushlendra Kumar	JVP (Note: Jantantrik Vikas Party)	49,989	29.48	16,077	9.49
Nalanda	177	Harnaut	Hari Narayan Singh	JD(U)	65,404	41.24	Mamta Devi	LJP	38,163	24.06	27,241	17.18
Patna	178	Mokama	Anant Kumar Singh	RJD	78,721	52.99	Rajeev Lochan Singh	JD(U)	42,964	28.92	35,757	24.07
Patna	179	Barh	Gyanendra Kumar Singh	BJP	49,327	32.94	Satyendra Bahadur	INC	39,087	26.10	10,240	6.84
Patna	180	Bakhtiarpur	Aniruddh Kumar	RJD	89,483	52.17	Ranvijay Singh	BJP	68,811	40.12	20,672	12.05
Patna	181	Digha	Sanjiv Chaurasia	BJP	97,318	57.09	Shashi Yadav	CPI(ML)	51,084	29.97	46,234	27.12
Patna	182	Bankipur	Nitin Nabin	BJP	83,068	59.05	Luv Sinha	INC	44,032	31.30	39,036	27.75
Patna	183	Kumhrar	Arun Kumar Sinha	BJP	81,400	54.00	Dharamendra Kumar	RJD	54,937	36.44	26,463	17.56
Patna	184	Patna Sahib	Nand Kishore Yadav	BJP	97,692	51.91	Pravin Singh	INC	79,392	42.19	18,300	9.72
Patna	185	Fatuha	Dr. Ramanand Yadav	RJD	85,769	50.87	Satyendra Singh	BJP	66,399	39.38	19,370	11.49
Patna	186	Danapur	Rit Lal Ray	RJD	89,895	48.44	Asha Devi	BJP	73,971	39.86	15,924	8.58
Patna	187	Maner	Bhai Virendra	RJD	94,223	47.44	Nikhil Anand	BJP	61,306	30.86	32,917	16.58
Patna	188	Phulwari (SC)	Gopal Ravidas	CPI(ML)	91,124	43.57	Arun Manjhi	JD(U)	77,267	36.95	13,857	6.62
Patna	189	Masaurhi (SC)	Rekha Devi	RJD	98,696	50.21	Nutan Paswan	JD(U)	66,469	33.81	32,227	16.40
Patna	190	Paliganj	Sandeep Saurav	CPI(ML)	67,917	43.73	Jay Vardhan Yadav	JD(U)	37,002	23.83	30,915	19.90
Patna	191	Bikram	Siddharth Saurav	INC	86,177	47.71	Anil Kumar	IND	50,717	28.08	35,460	19.63
Bhojpur	192	Sandesh	Kiran Devi	RJD	79,599	51.54	Vijayendra Yadav	JD(U)	28,992	18.77	50,607	32.77
Bhojpur	193	Barhara	Raghvendra Singh	BJP	76,182	46.15	Saroj Yadav	RJD	71,209	43.13	4,973	3.02
Bhojpur	194	Arrah	Amrendra; Pratap Singh	BJP	71,781	45.05	Quyamuddin Ansari	CPI(ML)	68,779	43.17	3,002	1.88
Bhojpur	195	Agiaon (SC)	Manoj Manzil	CPI(ML)	86,327	61.39	Prabhunath Prasad	JD(U)	37,777	26.87	48,550	34.52
Bhojpur	196	Tarari	Sudama Prasad	CPI(ML)	73,945	43.53	Narendra Pandey	IND	62,930	37.05	11,015	6.48
Bhojpur	197	Jagdishpur	Ram Vishun Singh	RJD	66,632	39.68	Bhagwan Kushwaha	LJP	44,525	26.51	22,107	13.17
Bhojpur	198	Shahpur	Rahul Tiwary	RJD	64,393	41.14	Shobha Devi	IND	41,510	26.52	22,883	14.62
Buxar	199	Brahampur	Shambhu Nath Yadav	RJD	90,176	48.64	Hulas Pandey	LJP	39,035	21.05	51,141	27.59
Buxar	200	Buxar	Sanjay Kr. Tiwari	INC	59,417	36.38	Parshuram Chaubey	BJP	55,525	33.99	3,892	2.39
Buxar	201	Dumraon	Ajit Kumar Singh	CPI(ML)	71,320	40.76	Anjum Ara	JD(U)	46,905	26.81	24,415	13.95
Buxar	202	Rajpur (SC)	Vishwanath Ram	INC	67,871	36.76	Santosh Kumar Nirala	JD(U)	46,667	25.28	21,204	11.48
Kaimur	203	Ramgarh	Sudhakar Singh	RJD	58,083	32.40	Ambika Singh	BSP	57,894	32.30	189	0.10
Kaimur	204	Mohania (SC)	Sangita Kumari	RJD	61,235	37.84	Niranjan Ram	BJP	49,181	30.39	12,054	7.45
Kaimur	205	Bhabua	Bharat Bind	RJD	57,561	32.98	Rinki Rani Pandey	BJP	47,516	27.22	10,045	5.76
Kaimur	206	Chainpur	Mohd. Zama Khan	BSP	95,245	46.24	Brij Kishor Bind	BJP	70,951	34.45	24,294	11.79
Rohtas	207	Chenari (SC)	Murari Gautam	INC	71,701	41.25	Lalan Paswan	JD(U)	53,698	30.89	18,003	10.36
Rohtas	208	Sasaram	Rajesh Kumar Gupta	RJD	83,303	46.54	Ashok Kumar	JD(U)	56,880	31.78	26,423	14.76
Rohtas	209	Kargahar	Santosh Kumar Mishra	INC	59,763	30.76	Bashisth Singh	JD(U)	55,680	28.66	4,083	2.10
Rohtas	210	Dinara	Vijay Kumar Mandal	RJD	59,541	34.97	Rajendra Singh	LJP	51,313	30.13	8,228	4.84
Rohtas	211	Nokha	Anita Devi	RJD	65,690	44.15	Nagendra C.	JD(U)	48,018	32.27	17,672	11.88
Rohtas	212	Dehri	Phate Bahadur Singh	RJD	64,567	41.57	Satyanarayan Singh	BJP	64,103	41.27	464	0.30
Rohtas	213	Karakat	Arun Singh	CPI(ML)	82,700	48.19	Rajeshwar Raj	BJP	64,511	37.59	18,189	10.60
Arwal	214	Arwal	Maha Nand Singh	CPI(ML)	68,286	47.18	Dipak Kumar; Sharma	BJP	48,336	33.40	19,950	13.78
Arwal	215	Kurtha	Bagi Kumar Verma	RJD	54,227	39.54	Satyadeo Singh	JD(U)	26,417	19.26	27,810	20.28
Jehanabad	216	Jehanabad	Kumar Krishna Mohan	RJD	75,030	47.03	Krishna Verma	JD(U)	41,128	25.78	33,902	21.25
Jehanabad	217	Ghosi	Ram Bali Yadav	CPI(ML)	74,712	49.07	Rahul Kumar	JD(U)	57,379	37.68	17,333	11.39
Jehanabad	218	Makhdumpur (SC)	Satish Kumar	RJD	71,571	52.01	Devendra Kumar	HAM	49,006	35.62	22,565	16.39
Aurangabad	219	Goh	Bheem Kumar Yadav	RJD	81,410	44.07	Manoj Kumar	BJP	45,792	24.79	35,618	19.28
Aurangabad	220	Obra	Rishi Kumar	RJD	63,662	36.24	Prakash Chandra	LJP	40,994	23.34	22,668	12.90
Aurangabad	221	Nabinagar	Vijay Singh	RJD	64,943	40.68	Virendra Kumar Singh	JD(U)	44,822	28.07	20,121	12.61
Aurangabad	222	Kutumba (SC)	Rajesh Kumar	INC	50,822	36.61	Sharwan Bhuiya	HAM	34,169	24.61	16,653	12.00
Aurangabad	223	Aurangabad	Anand Shankar Singh	INC	70,018	41.27	Ramadhar Singh	BJP	67,775	39.95	2,243	1.32
Aurangabad	224	Rafiganj	Md. Nehaluddin	RJD	63,325	34.22	Pramod Kumar Singh	IND	53,896	29.12	9,429	5.10
Gaya	225	Gurua	Vinay Yadav	RJD	70,761	39.55	Rajiv Nandan	BJP	64,162	35.86	6,599	3.69
Gaya	226	Sherghati	Manju Agrawal	RJD	61,804	35.74	Vinod Prasad Yadav	JD(U)	45,114	26.09	16,690	9.65
Gaya	227	Imamganj (SC)	Jitan Ram Manjhi	HAM	78,762	45.36	Uday Choudhary	RJD	62,728	36.12	16,034	9.24
Gaya	228	Barachatti (SC)	Jyoti Devi	HAM	72,491	39.21	Samta Devi	RJD	66,173	35.79	6,318	3.42
Gaya	229	Bodh Gaya (SC)	Kumar Sarvjeet	RJD	80,926	41.84	Hari Manjhi	BJP	76,218	39.40	4,708	2.44
Gaya	230	Gaya Town	Prem Kumar	BJP	66,932	49.89	Akhauri Onkar; Nath	INC	55,034	41.02	11,898	8.87
Gaya	231	Tikari	Anil Kumar	HAM	70,359	37.69	Sumant Kumar	INC	67,729	36.28	2,630	1.41
Gaya	232	Belaganj	Surendra Prasad Yadav	RJD	79,708	46.91	Abhay Kushwaha	JD(U)	55,745	32.81	23,963	14.10
Gaya	233	Atri	Ajay Yadav	RJD	62,658	36.55	Manorama Devi	JD(U)	54,727	31.93	7,931	4.62
Gaya	234	Wazirganj	Birendra Singh	BJP	70,713	40.23	Shashi Shekhar	INC	48,283	27.47	22,430	12.76
Nawada	235	Rajauli (SC)	Prakash Veer	RJD	69,984	41.72	Kanhaiya Kumar	BJP	57,391	34.22	12,593	7.50
Nawada	236	Hisua	Nitu Kumari	INC	94,930	49.81	Anil Singh	BJP	77,839	40.84	17,091	8.97
Nawada	237	Nawada	Vibha Devi Yadav	RJD	72,435	40.06	Sharwan Kumar	IND	46,125	25.51	26,310	14.55
Nawada	238	Gobindpur	Md. Kamran	RJD	79,557	49.21	Purnima Yadav	JD(U)	46,483	28.75	33,074	20.46
Nawada	239	Warsaliganj	Aruna Devi	BJP	62,451	36.49	Satish Kumar	INC	53,421	31.22	9,030	5.27
Jamui	240	Sikandra (SC)	Prafull Kumar Manjhi	HAM	47,061	30.67	Sudhir Kumar	INC	41,556	27.09	5,505	3.58
Jamui	241	Jamui	Shreyasi Singh	BJP	79,603	43.89	Vijay Prakash	RJD	38,554	21.26	41,049	22.63
Jamui	242	Jhajha	Damodar Rawat	JD(U)	76,972	39.55	Rajendra Prasad	RJD	75,293	38.69	1,679	0.86
Jamui	243	Chakai	Sumit Singh	IND	45,548	24.02	Savitri Devi	RJD	44,967	23.71	581	0.31

NDA distribution of 125 seats for a majority in 2020 Bihar Legislative Assembly election.
1. BJP-74 (59.2%)
2. JDU-43 (34.4%)
3. HAM-4 (3.20%)
4. VIP-4 (3.20%)

== Aftermath ==
=== Government formation ===
After the election process concluded, Chief Minister Nitish Kumar tendered his resignation to the Governor on 13 November 2020. The National Democratic Alliance members met at around 12:30 pm IST, on 15 November to formally announce and elect the new Chief Minister. Nitish Kumar was elected leader of the NDA and Chief Minister in the meeting. After being elected as the NDA leader in Bihar, Nitish said that he did not want to become the chief minister of the state and wanted someone from the BJP party to become the next chief minister. However he accepted the designation on the insistence of the BJP. Soon after, Nitish visited the Governor to stake claim to form the new government.

=== Reactions and analysis ===
After the election results were announced, the incumbent Chief Minister of Bihar Nitish Kumar thanked the Prime Minister of India Narendra Modi for his contribution and support to the National Democratic Alliance in the election campaign. Narendra Modi himself declared victory and quoted “Democracy has once again won in Bihar.”

Following the results, Tejashwi claimed to have "won 130 seats" and that "the mandate was in our favour, but the Election Commission’s results were declared in favour of NDA". He claimed, that the MGB "lost about 20 seats" because of "irregularities" in counting of postal ballots and threatened to move to court. The Election Commission termed the claims unfounded, adding that, according to procedure, the postal ballots including the invalid ones were re-verified where the margin of victory was less than the number of rejected ballots. Tejashwi also claimed that NDA won by "money, muscle power and deceit". Later the Election Commission claimed that it had counted random voter-verified paper audit trail which matched the EVM count.

The Time magazine called the victory as a triumph for Modi's "Hindu Nationalist Message". According to analysts BJP has become more significant in the state than before. The 14th Dalai Lama congratulated Nitish on his election victory.

=== Bye-election ===
S.No	Date	Constituency	MLA before election	Party before election	Elected MLA	Party after election
78	30 October 2021	Kusheshwar Asthan (SC)	Shashi Bhushan Hazari	Janata Dal (United)	Aman Bhushan Hajari	Janata Dal (United)
164	30 October 2021	Tarapur	Mewalal Chaudhary	Janata Dal (United)	Rajeev Kumar Singh	Janata Dal (United)|
91	12 April 2022	Bochahan (SC)	Musafir Paswan	Vikassheel Insaan Party	Amar Kumar Paswan	Rashtriya Janata Dal
101	3 November 2022	Gopalganj	Subash Singh	Bharatiya Janata Party	Kusum Devi	Bharatiya Janata Party
178	3 November 2022	Mokama	Anant Kumar Singh	Rashtriya Janata Dal	Nilam Devi	Rashtriya Janata Dal
93	5 December 2022	Kurhani	Anil Sahani	Rashtriya Janata Dal	Kedar Prasad Gupta	Bharatiya Janata Party
195	1 June 2024	Agiaon (SC)	Manoj Manzil	Communist Party of India (Marxist–Leninist) Liberation	Shiv Prakash Ranjan	Communist Party of India (Marxist–Leninist) Liberation
60	10 July 2024	Rupauli	Bima Bharti	Janata Dal (United)	Shankar Singh	Independent
196	13 November 2024	Tarari	Sudama Prasad	Communist Party of India (Marxist–Leninist) Liberation	Vishal Prashant	Bharatiya Janata Party
203	13 November 2024	Ramgarh	Sudhakar Singh	Rashtriya Janata Dal	Ashok Kumar Singh	Bharatiya Janata Party
227	13 November 2024	Imamganj (SC)	Jitan Ram Manjhi	Hindustani Awam Morcha	Deepa Manjhi	Hindustani Awam Morcha
232	13 November 2024	Belaganj	Surendra Prasad Yadav	Rashtriya Janata Dal	Manorama Devi	Janata Dal (United)

== See also ==
- 2020 elections in India
