= Savitri Devi (politician) =

Indian politician

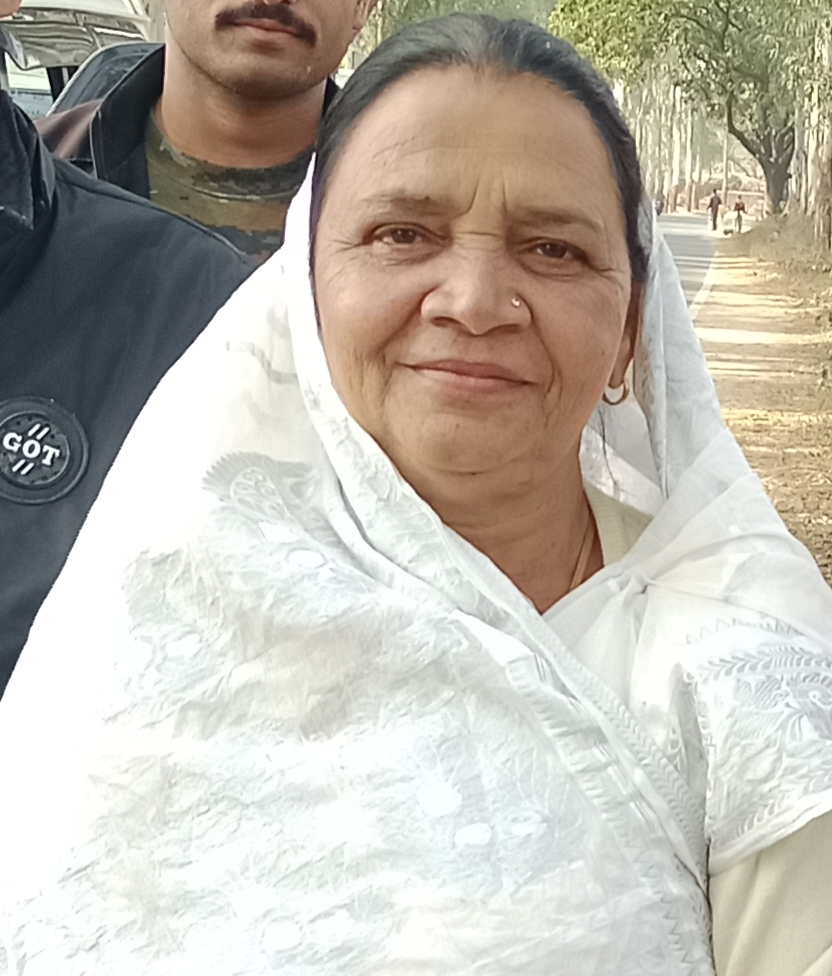
- Devi in 2025

Member of Bihar Legislative Assembly
- Preceded by: Sumit Kumar Singh
- Constituency: Chakai
- In office 2015–2020
- Incumbent
- Assumed office 2025

Personal details
- Party: Rashtriya Janata Dal
- Spouse: Phalguni Prasad Yadav
- Profession: Politician, social worker

Savitri Devi (born 1948) is an Indian politician from the state of Bihar, India. She is a member of the Bihar Legislative Assembly from Chakai Assembly constituency in Jamui district. She won the 2015 Bihar Legislative Assembly election, 2025 Bihar Legislative Assembly from Chakai representing Rashtriya Janata Dal.

== Early life and education ==
Devi is from Sirayndih village, Saraswati Watpur post, Chakai, Jamui district, Bihar. She married Phalguni Prasad Yadav. She studied intermediate (Class 12) at Phulguni Prasad Yadav College and passed the examinations in 1994. Later, she discontinued her studies.

== Career ==
Devi won from Chakai Assembly constituency representing Rashtriya Janata Dal in the 2015 Bihar Legislative Assembly election. She polled 47,064 votes and defeated her nearest rival, Sumit Kumar Singh, an independent politician, by a margin of 12,113 votes. In the 2020 Bihar Legislative Assembly election, she lost by a margin of 581 votes to the same candidate, Sumit Kumar Singh. She polled 44,967 votes while Singh got 45,548 votes.
