= Pramod Kumar Singh =

Indian politician

Member of the Bihar Legislative Assembly
- Incumbent
- Assumed office 14 November 2025
- Preceded by: Mohammad Nehaluddin
- Constituency: Rafiganj

Personal details
- Party: Janata Dal (United)
- Profession: Politician

Pramod Kumar Singh is an Indian politician from Bihar. He is elected as a Member of Legislative Assembly in 2025 Bihar Legislative Assembly election from Rafiganj constituency.
