= Chakai Assembly constituency =

Assembly constituency in Bihar, India

Coordinates: 24.55°N 86.40°E

- Constituency No. 243 for the Bihar Legislative Assembly

Constituency details
- Country: India
- Region: East India
- State: Bihar
- District: Jamui
- Lok Sabha constituency: Jamui (Lok Sabha constituency)
- Established: 1962
- Total electors: 319,819

Member of Legislative Assembly
- 18th Bihar Legislative Assembly
- Incumbent Savitri Devi (politician)
- Party: RJD
- Alliance: MGB
- Elected year: 2025
- Preceded by: Sumit Kumar Singh, Independent

Chakai Assembly constituency is an assembly constituency for Bihar Legislative Assembly in Jamui district of Bihar, India. It comes under Jamui (Lok Sabha constituency).

== Members of the Legislative Assembly ==
Year	Member	Party
1962	Lakhan Murmu	Socialist Party
1967	Shrikrishna Singh	Samyukta Socialist Party
1969	Shrikrishna Singh	Samyukta Socialist Party
1972	Chaudra Shakar Singh	Indian National Congress
1977	Phalguni Prasad Yadav	Independent politician
1980	Phalguni Prasad Yadav	Bharatiya Janata Party
1985	Narendra Singh	Indian National Congress
1990	Narendra Singh	Janata Dal
1995	Phalguni Prasad Yadav	Bharatiya Janata Party
2000	Narendra Singh	Independent politician
2005	Abhay Singh	Lok Janshakti Party
2005	Phalguni Prasad Yadav	Bharatiya Janata Party
2010	Sumit Kumar Singh	Jharkhand Mukti Morcha
2015	Savitri Devi	Rashtriya Janata Dal
2020	Sumit Kumar Singh	Independent politician
2025	Savitri Devi	Rashtriya Janata Dal

== Election results ==
=== 2025 ===
Bihar Assembly election, 2025: Chakai
Party	Candidate	Votes	%	±%
RJD	Savitri Devi	80,357	34.51	+10.8
JD(U)	Sumit Kumar Singh	67,385	28.94	+8.21
Independent	Sanjay Prasad	48,065	20.64	
Independent	Chandan Kumar Singh	12,502	5.37	
Independent	Alijaveth Soren	6,828	2.93	
Independent	Sosana Murmu	3,980	1.71	
RLJP	Allaudin Ansari	3,667	1.57	
Independent	Ranjit Kumar Verma	2,394	1.03	
NOTA	None of the above	4,522	1.94	−1.5
Majority		12,972	5.57	+5.26
Turnout		232,863	72.81	+6.74
RJD gain from Independent		Swing		

=== 2020 ===
Bihar Assembly election, 2020: Chakai
Party	Candidate	Votes	%	±%
Independent	Sumit Kumar Singh	45,548	24.02	+0.77
RJD	Savitri Devi	44,967	23.71	−7.6
JD(U)	Sanjay Prasad	39,319	20.73	
LJP	Sanjay Kumar Mandal	22,635	11.94	−7.04
JMM	Elizabeth Soren	16,985	8.96	+5.95
Independent	Sanjay Pandey	4,237	2.23	
BSP	Sitaram Saw	2,679	1.41	−5.95
Independent	Rahul Kumar	1,902	1.0	
NOTA	None of the above	6,521	3.44	−1.47
Majority		581	0.31	−7.75
Turnout		189,645	66.07	+9.76
Independent gain from RJD		Swing		

=== 2015 ===
2015 Bihar Legislative Assembly election: Chakai
Party	Candidate	Votes	%	±%
RJD	Savitri Devi	47,064	31.31	
Independent	Sumit Kumar Singh	34,951	23.25	
LJP	Vijay Kumar Singh	28,535	18.98	
BSP	Jowana Hansda	11,068	7.36	
Independent	Virendra Kumar	5,470	3.64	
JMM	Nepali Singh	4,532	3.01	
Loktantrik Sarvjan Samaj Party	Dharmendra Sinha	2,548	1.69	
CPI(ML)L	Manoj Kumar Pandey	2,309	1.54	
Independent	Bajrang Bihari Singh	2,233	1.49	
Independent	Abhinav Singh	1,782	1.19	
NOTA	None of the above	7,379	4.91	
Majority		12,113	8.06	
Turnout		150,335	56.31	
