= Rameshwar Mahto =

Indian politician

Rameshwar Kumar Mahto

Member of Bihar Legislative Assembly
- Incumbent
- Assumed office 14 November 2025
- Preceded by: Mukesh Kumar Yadav
- Constituency: Bajpatti

Member of the Bihar Legislative Council
- In office 2018–2024

Personal details
- Born: 17 March 1976 (age 50) Bhasar, Sitamarhi, Bihar
- Party: Rashtriya Lok Morcha
- Spouse: Smt.Sandhy Taneja Kumar
- Children: 2

Rameshwar Kumar Mahto is an Indian politician and Former member of the Bihar Legislative Council. Mahto is a member of Rashtriya Lok Morcha political party.

== Life and political career ==
Rameswar Mahto was born to Ramprakash Mahto at the Bhasar village in the Sitamarhi district of Bihar. He is the member of Bihar Legislative Council and has remained the organisational head of the Janata Dal (United). Mahto is an industrialist besides being a politician and he has remained associated with the party for long. Besides being a participant in active politics of the state of Bihar, he also runs business of crockery and marbles. Mahto has served as the district head of JD(U) for Madhubani. He is also active in social services. He has pursued B.Com and before getting elected as Member of Legislative Council, he was also actively participating in state elections for getting elected as Member of Legislative Assembly from Sitamarhi assembly constituency.

Mahto is considered close to Upendra Kushwaha, a former Janata Dal (United) leader. He supported Kushwaha, when latter had raised questions on intentions of some of the leaders of JDU, who were considered close to Chief Minister Nitish Kumar; Kushwaha had alleged these leaders of plotting to destroy JDU. Rameshwar Kumar Mahto resigned from JDU on 30 November 2024, and later joined the Rashtriya Lok Morcha on 24 January 2025
