= Sherghati Assembly constituency =

Assembly constituency in Bihar, India

- Constituency No. 226 for the Bihar Legislative Assembly

Constituency details
- Country: India
- Region: East India
- State: Bihar
- District: Gaya
- Lok Sabha constituency: Gaya
- Established: 1957
- Total electors: 279,534

Member of Legislative Assembly
- 18th Bihar Legislative Assembly
- Incumbent Uday Kumar Singh
- Party: LJP(RV)
- Alliance: NDA
- Elected year: 2025

Sherghati Assembly constituency is an assembly constituency for Bihar Legislative Assembly in Gaya district of Bihar, India. It comes under Gaya (Lok Sabha constituency).

== Members of the Legislative Assembly ==
Year	Member	Party
1957	Shahjehan Mohammad	Indian National Congress
1962	Shahjehan Mohammad	Indian National Congress
1967	M. A. Khan	Jan Kranti Dal
1969	Jairam Giri	Independent politician
1972	Jairam Giri	Indian National Congress
1977-2008: Constituency did not exist
2010	Vinod Prasad Yadav	Janata Dal (United)
2015	Vinod Prasad Yadav	Janata Dal (United)
2020	Manju Agrawal	Rashtriya Janata Dal
2025	Uday Kumar Singh	Lok Janshakti Party (Ram Vilas)

== Election results ==
=== 2025 ===
2025 Bihar Legislative Assembly election: Sherghati
Party	Candidate	Votes	%	±%
LJP(RV)	Uday Kumar Singh	77,270	38.13	
RJD	Pramod Kumar Verma	63,746	31.46	−4.28
JSP	Pawan Kishore	18,982	9.37	
AIMIM	Shane Ali Khan	14,754	7.28	−1.39
Independent	Surendra Kumar Suman	8,284	4.09	
BSP	Shailesh Kumar Mishra	2,745	1.35	
Independent	Mukesh Kumar Yadav	2,707	1.34	
NOTA	None of the above	6,968	3.44	+0.44
Majority		13,524	6.67	−2.98
Turnout		202,640	72.49	+9.46
LJP(RV) gain from RJD		Swing		

=== 2020 ===
2020 Bihar Legislative Assembly election: Sherghati
Party	Candidate	Votes	%	±%
RJD	Manju Agrawal	61,804	35.74	
JD(U)	Vinod Prasad Yadav	45,114	26.09	−4.02
LJP	Mukesh Kumar Yadav	24,107	13.94	
AIMIM	Masaroor Alam	14,987	8.67	
JAP(L)	Omair Khan	11,805	6.83	
Independent	Mukesh Prasad	3,331	1.93	
Independent	Ramchandra Prasad Yadav	2,652	1.53	
NOTA	None of the above	5,194	3.0	−1.38
Majority		16,690	9.65	+6.38
Turnout		172,946	63.03	+3.27
RJD gain from JD(U)		Swing		

=== 2015 ===
Bihar Assembly election, 2015: Sherghati
Party	Candidate	Votes	%	±%
JD(U)	Vinod Prasad Yadav	44,579	30.11	
HAM(S)	Mukesh Kumar Yadav	39,745	26.84	
Independent	Manju Agrawal	29,671	20.04	
Independent	Md.Raza Khan	5,014	3.39	
JMM	Akhilesh Kumar	4,113	2.78	
Independent	Mukesh Kumar	3,531	2.38	
BSP	Dinesh Kumar Dinbandhu	2,997	2.02	
NCP	Mohammad Shahid Alam	2,852	1.93	
CPI(ML)L	Shila Kumari	2,673	1.81	
Independent	Badhan Bhuiyan	2,472	1.67	
SS	Raghu Nandan Prasad	2,141	1.45	
Pragatisheel Magahi Samaj	Sukhdeo Yadav	1,801	1.22	
NOTA	None of the above	6,482	4.38	
Majority		4,834	3.27	
Turnout		148,071	59.76	
gain from		Swing		
