= Uday Kumar Singh =

Indian politician

Member of the Bihar Legislative Assembly
- Incumbent
- Assumed office 14 November 2025
- Preceded by: Manju Agrawal
- Constituency: Sherghati

Personal details
- Party: Lok Janshakti Party (Ram Vilas)
- Profession: Politician

Uday Kumar Singh is an Indian politician from Bihar. He is elected as a Member of Legislative Assembly in 2025 Bihar Legislative Assembly election from Sherghati constituency.
