= Manju Agrawal =

Indian politician

Member of Bihar Legislative Assembly
- In office 2020–2025
- Preceded by: Vinod Prasad Yadav
- Succeeded by: Uday Kumar Singh
- Constituency: Sherghati

Personal details
- Party: Rashtriya Janata Dal
- Profession: Politician

Manju Agrawal (born 1972) is an Indian politician from Bihar. She is an MLA from Sherghati Assembly constituency in Gaya district, representing Rashtriya Janata Dal Party. She won the 2020 Bihar Legislative Assembly election.

== Early life and education ==
Agrawal is from Sherghati, Gaya district. She married Tuntun Prasad, a businessman. She completed LL.B in 2011 at Magadh University, Bodh Gaya.

== Career ==
Agrawal won the 2020 Bihar Legislative Assembly election from Sherghati Assembly constituency representing Rashtriya Janata Dal. She polled votes and defeated her nearest rival, Vinod Prasad Yadav of Janata Dal (United), by a margin of 16,690 votes.
