= Rafiganj Assembly constituency =

Assembly constituency in Bihar, India

Coordinates: 24.82°N 84.64°E

- Constituency No. 224 for the Bihar Legislative Assembly

Constituency details
- Country: India
- Region: East India
- State: Bihar
- District: Aurangabad
- Lok Sabha constituency: Aurangabad (Bihar Lok Sabha constituency)
- Established: 1951
- Total electors: 333,900
- Reservation: None

Member of Legislative Assembly
- 18th Bihar Legislative Assembly
- Incumbent Pramod Kumar Singh
- Party: JD(U)
- Alliance: NDA
- Elected year: 2025

Rafiganj Assembly constituency is an assembly constituency for Bihar Legislative Assembly in Aurangabad, Bihar district of Bihar, India. It comes under Aurangabad Lok Sabha constituency along with other assembly constituencies viz. Kutumba, Aurangabad, Gurua, Imamganj and Tikari.

== Members of the Legislative Assembly ==
Year	Name	Party
1952	S. M. Latifur Rahman	Indian National Congress
1957	Sarjoo Prasad Sinha	Indian National Congress
1962	Ram Pukar Singh	Swatantra Party
1967	Dilkeshwar Ram	Indian National Congress
1969	Sahdeo Choudhary	Bharatiya Jana Sangh
1972	Faguni Ram	Indian National Congress
1977	Md. Hussain Ansari	Janata Party
1980	Vijay Kumar Singh	Janata Party
1985	Vijay Kumar Singh	Indian National Congress
1990	Vijay Kumar Singh	Indian National Congress
1995	Ram Chandra Singh	Communist Party of India
2000	Sushil Kumar Singh	Samata Party
2005	Mohammad Nehaluddin	Rashtriya Janata Dal
2005	Mohammad Nehaluddin	Rashtriya Janata Dal
2010	Ashok Kumar Singh	Janata Dal (United)
2015	Ashok Kumar Singh	Janata Dal (United)
2020	Mohammad Nehaluddin	Rashtriya Janata Dal
2025	Pramod Kumar Singh	Janata Dal

== Election results ==
=== 2025 ===
Bihar Legislative Assembly Election, 2025: Rafiganj
Party	Candidate	Votes	%	±%
JD(U)	Pramod Kumar Singh	107,515	47.95	+33.45
RJD	Dr. Ghulam Shahid	95,559	42.61	+8.39
BSP	Suman Kumari	4,432	1.98	−5.91
Independent	Suryadeep Singh	4,215	1.88	
JSP	Vikash Singh	3,029	1.35	
NOTA	None of the above	4,958	2.21	+0.49
Majority		11,956	5.34	+0.24
Turnout		224,239	67.16	+11.19
JD(U) gain from RJD		Swing		

=== 2020 ===
2020 Bihar Legislative Assembly election: Rafiganj
Party	Candidate	Votes	%	±%
RJD	Mohammad Nehaludin	63,325	34.22	
Independent	Pramod Kumar Singh	53,896	29.12	
JD(U)	Ashok Kumar Singh	26,833	14.5	−24.97
BSP	Ranjit Kumar	14,597	7.89	+0.66
LJP	Manoj Kumar Singh	8,491	4.59	−28.9
Independent	Arif Raja	4,872	2.63	
Independent	Santosh Kumar Urf Santosh Kushwaha	2,165	1.17	
NOTA	None of the above	3,190	1.72	+0.75
Majority		9,429	5.1	−0.88
Turnout		185,053	55.97	+3.47
RJD gain from JD(U)		Swing		

=== 2015 ===
2015 Bihar Legislative Assembly election: Rafiganj
Party	Candidate	Votes	%	±%
JD(U)	Ashok Kumar Singh	62,897	39.47	
LJP	Pramod Kumar Singh	53,372	33.49	
BSP	Alauddin Mohammad	11,530	7.23	
Independent	Ashok Saw	5,607	3.52	
Independent	Niraj Kumar	3,687	2.31	
Independent	Vishal Kumar Singh	3,395	2.13	
Garib Janta Dal (Secular)	Aqueel Akhatar Ansari	3,260	2.05	
CPI	Kasim	3,161	1.98	
Independent	Tulsi Yadav	3,078	1.93	
Independent	Arjun Yadav	1,543	0.97	
JAP(L)	Suresh Mehta	1,442	0.9	
NOTA	None of the above	1,553	0.97	
Majority		9,525	5.98	
Turnout		159,371	52.5	

== See also ==
- List of constituencies of Bihar Legislative Assembly
