= Jhajha Assembly constituency =

Assembly constituency in Bihar, India

Coordinates: 24.77°N 86.38°E

- Constituency No. 242 for the Bihar Legislative Assembly

Constituency details
- Country: India
- Region: East India
- State: Bihar
- District: Jamui
- Lok Sabha constituency: Jamui
- Established: 1951
- Total electors: 339,867

Member of Legislative Assembly
- 18th Bihar Legislative Assembly
- Incumbent Damodar Rawat
- Party: JD(U)
- Alliance: NDA
- Elected year: 2025

Jhajha Assembly constituency is an assembly constituency for Bihar Legislative Assembly in Jamui district of Bihar, India. It comes under Jamui (Lok Sabha constituency).

== Members of the Legislative Assembly ==
Year	Member	Party
1952	Chandrashekhar Singh	Indian National Congress
1957	Bhagwat Murmu	Indian National Congress
1957	Chandrashekhar Singh	Indian National Congress
1962	Shri Krishna Singh	Socialist Party
1967	Shiv Nandan Jha	Samyukta Socialist Party
1969	Chandrashekhar Singh	Indian National Congress
1972	Shiv Nandan Jha	Samyukta Socialist Party
1977	Shiv Nandan Jha	Janata Party
1980	Shiv Nandan Yadav	Indian National Congress
1985	Shiv Nandan Yadav	Indian National Congress
1986^	Ravindra Yadav	Indian National Congress
1990	Shiv Nandan Jha	Janata Dal
1995	Rameshwer Singh	Indian National Congress
2000	Damodar Rawat	Samata Party
2005	Damodar Rawat	Janata Dal (United)
2005	Damodar Rawat	Janata Dal (United)
2010	Damodar Rawat	Janata Dal (United)
2015	Ravindra Yadav	Bharatiya Janata Party
2020	Damodar Rawat	Janata Dal (United)
2025	Damodar Rawat	Janata Dal (United)

== Election results ==
=== 2025 ===
Bihar Assembly election, 2025: Jhajha
Party	Candidate	Votes	%	±%
JD(U)	Damodar Rawat	108,317	44.42	+4.87
RJD	Jay Prakash Narayan Yadav	104,055	42.67	+3.98
Independent	Mohammad Irfan	9,578	3.93	
JSP	Nilendu Dutta Mishara	6,148	2.52	
NPP	Amarjeet Kumar Singh	3,278	1.34	
Independent	Ravindra Yadav	3,141	1.29	
NOTA	None of the above	4,619	1.89	−1.34
Majority		4,262	1.75	+0.89
Turnout		243,866	71.75	+10.17
JD(U) hold		Swing		

=== 2020 ===
Bihar Assembly election, 2020: Jhajha
Party	Candidate	Votes	%	±%
JD(U)	Damodar Rawat	76,972	39.55	+13.0
RJD	Raghvendar Yadav	75,293	38.69	
BSP	Binod Pd. Yadav	13,479	6.93	−0.06
LJP	Ravindra Yadav	11,762	6.04	
Independent	Rahul Kumar Singh	3,260	1.68	
Independent	Vijay Kumar	2,972	1.53	
Independent	Vinod Kumar Sinha	1,870	0.96	
NOTA	None of the above	6,278	3.23	+0.57
Majority		1,679	0.86	−12.63
Turnout		194,609	61.58	+7.65
JD(U) gain from BJP		Swing		

=== 2015 ===
2015 Bihar Legislative Assembly election: Jhajha
Party	Candidate	Votes	%	±%
BJP	Ravindra Yadav	65,537	40.04	
JD(U)	Damodar Rawat	43,451	26.55	
Independent	Binod Pd. Yadav	20,745	12.67	
BSP	Avid Kausar	11,444	6.99	
CPI(M)	Sheo Shankar Singh	5,281	3.23	
Independent	Sanjay Kumar Sinha	3,522	2.15	
Independent	Surya Vats	3,017	1.84	
NOTA	None of the above	4,354	2.66	
Majority		22,086	13.49	
Turnout		163,687	53.93	
