= Ranju Geeta =

Indian politician

Member of the Bihar Legislative Assembly
- In office 2010–2020
- Succeeded by: Mukesh Kumar Yadav
- Constituency: Bajpatti

Personal details
- Born: 1 August 1974 (age 52) Nesra, Nalanda, Bihar
- Party: Janata Dal (United)
- Spouse: Dilip Kumar
- Children: 2
- Education: Ph.D.
- Alma mater: Patna University; Magadh University

Ranju Geeta (born 1 August 1974) is an Indian politician. She is member of the Bihar Legislative Assembly since November 2010 representing Bajpatti Vidhan Sabha constituency, in Sitamarhi district. Currently, she is also the Vice President of Janata Dal (United) Bihar Unit.

== Early life and education ==
She was born in village Nesra, district Nalanda, Bihar. Ranju Geeta did her Matriculation from B.M. High School, Siwan in 1988 in a family belonging to Yadav caste. She passed her Intermediate and Graduation from Arvind women's college, Patna in the year 1990 and 1994 respectively. She has done her Masters from Patna university in the year 1996. And obtained her Ph.D. degree from Magadh University, Bodhgaya in the year 2004.

== Personal life ==
She is married to Dilip Kumar. She has two sons. Her husband Dilip Kumar works for railway.

== Political career ==
In her student life she was active in student politics and in the year 2001–2002 she entered mainstream active politics. Later in the year 2010 she contested Bihar assembly election as JD(U) candidate. She won the 2010 Bihar assembly election from Bajpatti Vidhan Sabha constituency in Sitamarhi district. And in the consecutive Vidhan Sabha election in 2015 she defeated Rekha Kumari of RLSP.
