= Bajpatti Assembly constituency =

Constituency of the Bihar legislative assembly in India

Coordinates: 26°34′N 85°37′E

- Constituency No. - for the Bihar Legislative Assembly

Constituency details
- Country: India
- Region: East India
- State: Bihar
- District: Sitamarhi district
- Lok Sabha constituency: Sitamarhi
- Established: 2008
- Total electors: 333,004
- Reservation: None

Member of Legislative Assembly
- 18th Bihar Legislative Assembly
- Incumbent Rameshwar Mahto
- Party: RLM
- Alliance: NDA
- Elected year: 2025
- Preceded by: Mukesh Kumar Yadav (RJD)

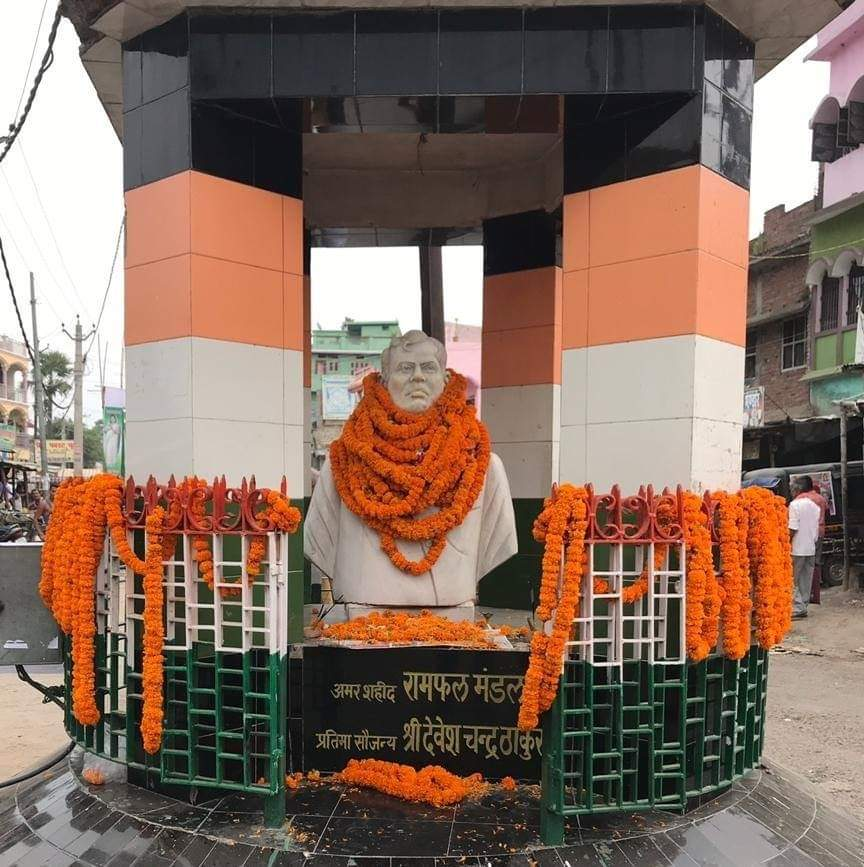
Ramphal Mandal Tower Chawk

Bajpatti Assembly constituency is an assembly constituency in Sitamarhi district in the Indian state of Bihar.

== Overview ==
As per Delimitation of Parliamentary and Assembly constituencies Order, 2008, 27. Bajpatti Assembly constituency is composed of the following: Bajpatti and Bokhara community development blocks; Birar, Bhadiyan, Janipur, Bahera Jahidpur, Dorpur, Majhaur, Rasulganj Urf Koili, Nanpur Uttari, Nanpur Dakshini, Dadri, Sirsi and Gauri gram panchayats of Nanpur CD Block.

Bajpatti Assembly constituency is part of Sitamarhi (Lok Sabha constituency).

== Members of the Legislative Assembly ==
Year	Name	Party
Until 2008: Constituency did not exist
2010	Ranju Geeta	Janata Dal (United)
2015	Ranju Geeta	Janata Dal (United)
2020	Mukesh Kumar Yadav	Rashtriya Janata Dal
2025	Rameshwar Mahto	Rashtriya Lok Morcha

== Election results ==
=== 2025 ===
2025 Bihar Legislative Assembly election: Bajpatti
Party	Candidate	Votes	%	±%
RLM	Rameshwar Mahto	99,144	45.02	
RJD	Mukesh Kumar Yadav	95,749	43.47	+3.26
JSP	Aajam Khan	6,174	2.8	
Independent	Md. Munna Mansuri	3,105	1.41	
The Plurals Party	Rakesh Kumar	3,080	1.4	
Independent	Mohd. Zeyaur Rahman	2,480	1.13	
BSP	Deonandan Ram	2,186	0.99	
NOTA	None of the above	2,303	1.05	+0.24
Majority		3,395	1.55	+0.03
Turnout		220,241	66.14	+10.29
RLM gain from RJD		Swing		

=== 2020 ===
Bihar Assembly election, 2020: Bajpatti
Party	Candidate	Votes	%	±%
RJD	Mukesh Kumar Yadav	71,483	40.21	
JD(U)	Ranju Geeta	68,779	38.69	−4.61
RLSP	Rekha Kumari	11,267	6.34	−26.04
LJP	Intekhab Alam	6,183	3.48	
RUC	Saiyad Neyaz Ahamad	3,191	1.79	
Independent	Md. Iftekhar	2,077	1.17	
Independent	Devendra Jha	1,908	1.07	−1.08
Independent	Ramnihora Sah	1,629	0.92	
NOTA	None of the above	1,441	0.81	−1.86
Majority		2,704	1.52	−9.4
Turnout		177,777	55.85	+1.21
RJD gain from JD(U)		Swing		

=== 2015 ===
2015 Bihar Legislative Assembly election: Bajpatti
Party	Candidate	Votes	%	±%
JD(U)	Ranju Geeta	67,194	43.3	
RLSP	Rekha Kumari	50,248	32.38	
Independent	Rabindra Kumar Shahi	8,033	5.18	
Independent	Vijay Kumar Jha	4,190	2.7	
Independent	Shyam Babu Chaudhary	3,372	2.17	
Independent	Devendra Jha	3,339	2.15	
Independent	Fudan Kumar Jha	1,852	1.19	
BSP	Akhileshwar Kumar	1,624	1.05	
Independent	Ash Narayan Jha	1,588	1.02	
NCP	Ansar Ahmad	1,512	0.97	
NOTA	None of the above	4,138	2.67	
Majority		16,946	10.92	
Turnout		155,175	54.64	
