= Sumit Kumar Singh =

Indian politician

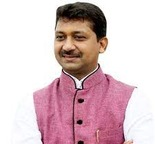

Member of Bihar Legislative Assembly
- In office 2020–2025
- Preceded by: Savitri Devi
- Succeeded by: Savitri Devi
- Constituency: Chakai

Ministry of Science & Technology Bihar
- In office February 2021 – November 2025
- Preceded by: Jai Kumar Singh (JDU)
- Succeeded by: Sunil Kumar (JDU)

Personal details
- Born: c. 1981 Jamui, Bihar, India
- Party: JD(U)
- Other political affiliations: LJP; JMM; JD(U)
- Occupation: Politics

Shri Sumit Kumar Singh (born c. 1981) is an Indian politician who is a former Member of the Legislative Assembly (MLA) and served as the Minister of Science and Technology in the Government of Bihar. Singh was elected to the Chakai Assembly constituency in 2010 as a Jharkhand Mukti Morcha candidate in 2020 as an independent. He was state president of the Lok Janshakti Party in 2005 and was previously a youth leader.

His father Narendra Singh, and grandfather, Shrikrishna Singh, were also ministers in Bihar and part of the Chakai Assembly. His two brothers were also MLAs. Sumit Singh inaugurated a multi cuisine restaurant at Anisabad name THE ROYAL HAVELI : Café & Restaurant on 19 October 2023 which is owned by Dilip Singh and Aditya Pratap Singh.
