= Phalguni Prasad Yadav =

Indian politician

Bihar Legislative Assembly
- Preceded by: Chaudra Shakar Singh
- Constituency: Chakai

Personal details
- Born: Jamui, Bihar, India
- Political party: Bharatiya Janata Party
- Occupation: Politics

Phalguni Prasad Yadav was an Indian politician and a member of the Bharatiya Janata Party (BJP). Yadav was elected as a member of the Bihar Legislative Assembly from the Chakai constituency four times.

== See also ==
- Phalguni Prasad Yadav College
