= Mohammad Nehaluddin =

Indian politician

Member of the Bihar Legislative Assembly
- In office 16 November 2020 – 2025
- Preceded by: Ashok Kumar Singh
- Constituency: Rafiganj

Member of the Bihar Legislative Assembly
- In office February 2005 – November 2010
- Constituency: Rafiganj

Member of the Bihar Legislative Assembly

Personal details
- Born: 3 February 1952 (age 74)
- Party: Rashtriya Janta Dal
- Parent: Mohammad Kamaluddin

Mohammad Nehaluddin is a Rashtriya Janta Dal senior leader and Bihar Legislative Assembly Member from Rafiganj Assembly Constituency. He won in 2020 Bihar Assembly Election on RJD ticket. He is a three-term MLA from the Rafiganj constituency. He defeated Independent candidate by 11 thousand votes and two term incumbent JD(U) MLA Asok Kumar Singh came a distant third.

He had won MLA seat in February 2005 and November 2005 Bihar Assembly Election. He lost in 2010 Bihar Assembly Elections to JD(U) candidate Ashok Kumar Singh.

Mohammad Nehaluddin was denied ticket in 2015 due to Mahagatbandhan formation in Bihar by RJD, JD(U) and Indian National Congress. Rafiganj was given to JD(U) in seat sharing formula due to incumbent JD(U) MLA in 2015 Ashok Kumar Singh.

While campaigning for 2010 Bihar Assembly Elections in Rafiganj, he was kidnapped by Naxals in Madanpur block of Lalteinganj. Later, he was released with a warning to not campaign in the area.

== Early life ==
Mohammad Nehaluddin was born in 1952 in Chatarghat Village of Gaya district. He is the eldest child of Mohammad Kamaluddin. He is educated till matriculation.

== Political career ==
He started his political career as Mukhiya from his village then he served as the Bihar Sunni Waqf Board Chairman during Rabri Devi's government before becoming an MLA in 2005 from Rafiganj.

== Controversies ==
He made an objectionable statement in the wake of riots in Bihar's Sasaram district during Ramnavami Processions. The lawmaker said that Muslims were making bombs in 'self-defence'. Later, he backtracked, claiming that his comments were twisted by the media, and that making bombs can never be justified as it is wrong.
