= Ravindra Yadav =

Indian politician

Member of Bihar Legislative Assembly
- In office 2015–2020
- Preceded by: Damodar Rawat
- Succeeded by: Damodar Rawat
- Constituency: Jhajha

Member of Bihar Legislative Assembly
- In office 1986
- Preceded by: Shiv Nandan Prasad Yadav
- Succeeded by: Shiv Nandan Jha
- Constituency: Jhajha

Member of Bihar Legislative Assembly
- Incumbent
- Assumed office 1995-2000
- Preceded by: Shiv Nandan Jha
- Succeeded by: Damodar Rawat
- Constituency: Jhajha

Personal details
- Born: Ravindra Yadav; 1 December 1955 (age 70) Vill. Chandwari, Post. Jhajha, PS. Jhajha, Jamui, Bihar
- Party: Lok Janshakti Party
- Other political affiliations: Bharatiya Janata Party; Rashtriya Janata Dal; Indian National Congress
- Spouse: Poonam Yadav
- Children: 01 (Son); 01 (Daughter)
- Education: MBBS
- Profession: Doctor

Ravindra Yadav is an Indian politician. He was elected to the Bihar Legislative Assembly from Jhajha. He is a member of the Bihar Legislative Assembly as a member of the BJP. His father Shiv Nandan Prasad Yadav also served as a member of the Bihar Legislative Assembly from Jhajha until his death.
