= Vinod Prasad Yadav =

Indian politician

Member of Bihar Legislative Assembly
- In office 2010–2020
- Preceded by: Jairam Giri
- Succeeded by: Manju Agrawal
- Constituency: Sherghati

Minister of Panchayati Raj Government of Bihar
- In office 20 May 2014 – 22 February 2015
- Preceded by: Bhim Singh
- Succeeded by: Kapil Deo Kamat

Personal details
- Born: 15 April 1967 (age 59) Kalandra, Gaya, India, Bihar, India
- Party: Janata Dal (United)
- Education: PhD Magadh University
- Profession: Politician business

Vinod Prasad Yadav (born 15 April 1967) is an Indian politician. He was elected to the Bihar Legislative Assembly from Sherghati as the 2010 Member of Bihar Legislative Assembly and a member of the Janata Dal (United).
