= Mukesh Kumar Yadav =

Indian politician

Bihar Legislative Assembly
- In office 2020–2025
- Constituency: Bajpatti Assembly constituency

Personal details
- Born: Sitamarhi
- Party: RJD
- Occupation: Politics

Mukesh Kumar Yadav alias Mukesh Yadav is an Indian politician from Bihar and a Member of the Bihar Legislative Assembly. Yadav won the Bajpatti Assembly constituency on the RJD ticket in the 2020 Bihar Legislative Assembly election.
