= Sanjay Prasad =

Indian politician

Member of the Bihar Legislative Council
- In office 2016–2022
- Succeeded by: Ajay Kumar Singh
- Constituency: Jamui–Munger–Lakhisarai–Sheikhpura

Personal details
- Born: 21 January 1968 (age 58)
- Party: Janata Dal (United)
- Other political affiliations: Rashtriya Janata Dal

Sanjay Prasad (born 21 January 1968) is an Indian politician who served as a Member of the Bihar Legislative Council from Jamui, Bihar. He resigned from Rashtriya Janata Dal and joined Janata Dal (United) with four others.
