= Alok Kumar Singh =

Indian politician

Member of Bihar Legislative Assembly
- Incumbent
- Assumed office 14 November 2025
- Chief Minister: Nitish Kumar
- Preceded by: Vijay Mandal
- Constituency: Dinara

Bihar President of Rashtriya Lok Morcha
- Incumbent
- Assumed office 30 January 2026
- National President: Upendra Kushwaha
- Preceded by: Nitin Bharti

Personal details
- Party: Rashtriya Lok Morcha
- Parent: Rameshwar Singh
- Profession: Agriculturist

Alok Kumar Singh is an Indian politician, currently serving as the member of Member of Bihar Legislative Assembly elected from Dinara. He is the member of Rashtriya Lok Morcha.

== Political career ==
Following the 2025 Bihar Legislative Assembly election, he was elected as an MLA from the Dinara Assembly constituency, defeating Abhishek Ranjan, the candidate from the Independencent, by a margin of 78,338 votes.
