= Deepak Prakash =

Indian politician

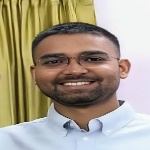

Minister of Panchayati Raj Government of Bihar
- Incumbent
- Assumed office 07 May 2026
- Chief Minister: Samrat Choudhary
- Preceded by: Samrat Choudhary
- In office 20 November 2025 – 15 April 2026
- Chief Minister: Nitish Kumar
- Preceded by: Kedar Prasad Gupta
- Succeeded by: Samrat Choudhary (as Chief Minister)

Member of Bihar Legislative Council
- Incumbent
- Assumed office 5 August 2026
- Constituency: Nominated

Personal details
- Born: Deepak Prakash; 22 October 1989 (age 36) Patna, Bihar, India
- Party: Rashtriya Lok Morcha
- Spouse: Sakshi Mishra
- Parents: Upendra Kushwaha (father); Snehlata Kushwaha (mother)
- Education: B. Tech in Computer Science from MIT, Manipal, 2011

Deepak Prakash, also known as Deepak Prakash Kushwaha, (born 22 October 1989) is an Indian politician from Bihar. He is a member of the Rashtriya Lok Morcha and currently serves as a Minister of Panchayati Raj in the Government of Bihar since 20 November 2025.

== Early life and education ==
Deepak Prakash was born on 22 October 1989 in Patna, Bihar. He completed his Bachelor of Technology in Computer Science from MIT, Manipal in 2011.

== Political career ==
Deepak Prakash entered politics as a member of the Rashtriya Lok Morcha. In 2025, he was appointed as a Minister in the Bihar government under Chief Minister Nitish Kumar. He has not contested any election prior to becoming a minister. He first captured media spotlight during 2025 Bihar Legislative Assembly elections, when he and his wife Sakshi Mishra did widespread campaigning in the favour of his mother and Rashtriya Lok Morcha candidate from Sasaram Assembly constituency, Snehlata Kushwaha. Snehlata won this election with a fair margin of votes.

On 22 November 2025, he took the charge of Ministry of Panchayati Raj in Government of Bihar, which deals with issues related to local governance. In his first press statement, Prakash announced that the ministry under his charge will focus on filling the vacancies under various departments of Panchayati Raj ministry. Prakash also announced that the ministry will focus on creating revenue generating assets on the land owned by Zila Parishad, the local body at district level in Indian federal system. He also proposed formation of committees at the Panchayat level, staffed by representatives of different political parties for overseeing various public works at the level of Gram Panchayats. This, according to him, was necessary to ensure accountability. Prakash also raised the issue of pendency in construction of building of Panchayat Bhawan at various places in state and poor quality of building material used, with a target to solve this issue on priority basis.

== Controversy ==
His appointment as minister without contesting any election led to public and media controversy. Questions were raised about political nepotism, and critics highlighted that he was taking office despite no prior legislative experience. In August 2026, after the objection of Supreme Court on Prakash's ministerial office without being part of any of the houses of Bihar Legislature, Bharatiya Janata Party MLC Devesh Kumar resigned from his seat to make the way for nomination of Prakash to the upper house of Bihar Legislature. In the meantime, Prakash was nominated to Bihar Legislative Council by Governor of Bihar.

== Personal life ==
Deepak Prakash is married to Sakshi Mishra, the daughter of former bureaucrat S.N. Mishra from Uttar Pradesh. His mother is Snehlata Kushwaha.
