= Snehlata Kushwaha =

Indian politician

Member of Bihar Legislative Assembly
- Incumbent
- Assumed office 14 November 2025
- Preceded by: Rajesh Kumar Gupta
- Constituency: Sasaram

Personal details
- Party: Rashtriya Lok Morcha
- Spouse: Upendra Kushwaha
- Profession: Politician

Snehlata Kushwaha is an Indian politician from Bihar. She is a member of the Bihar Legislative Assembly from Sasaram Assembly constituency in Rohtas district. She won the 2025 Bihar Legislative Assembly election representing the Rashtriya Lok Morcha. She defeated Satendra Sah. She studied up to Class 12 and she is into dairy business.

== Personal life ==
Snehlata has completed her matriculation and intermediate course from RAS High School, Jandaha in 1983 and 1986. She married Upendra Kushwaha, the former minister of state for human resource development in Government of India. Her son Deepak Prakash is serving as a minister in Government of Bihar in Tenth Nitish Kumar ministry.
