= Upendra Kushwaha =

Former Minister of State for Human Resource Development, India (born 1960)

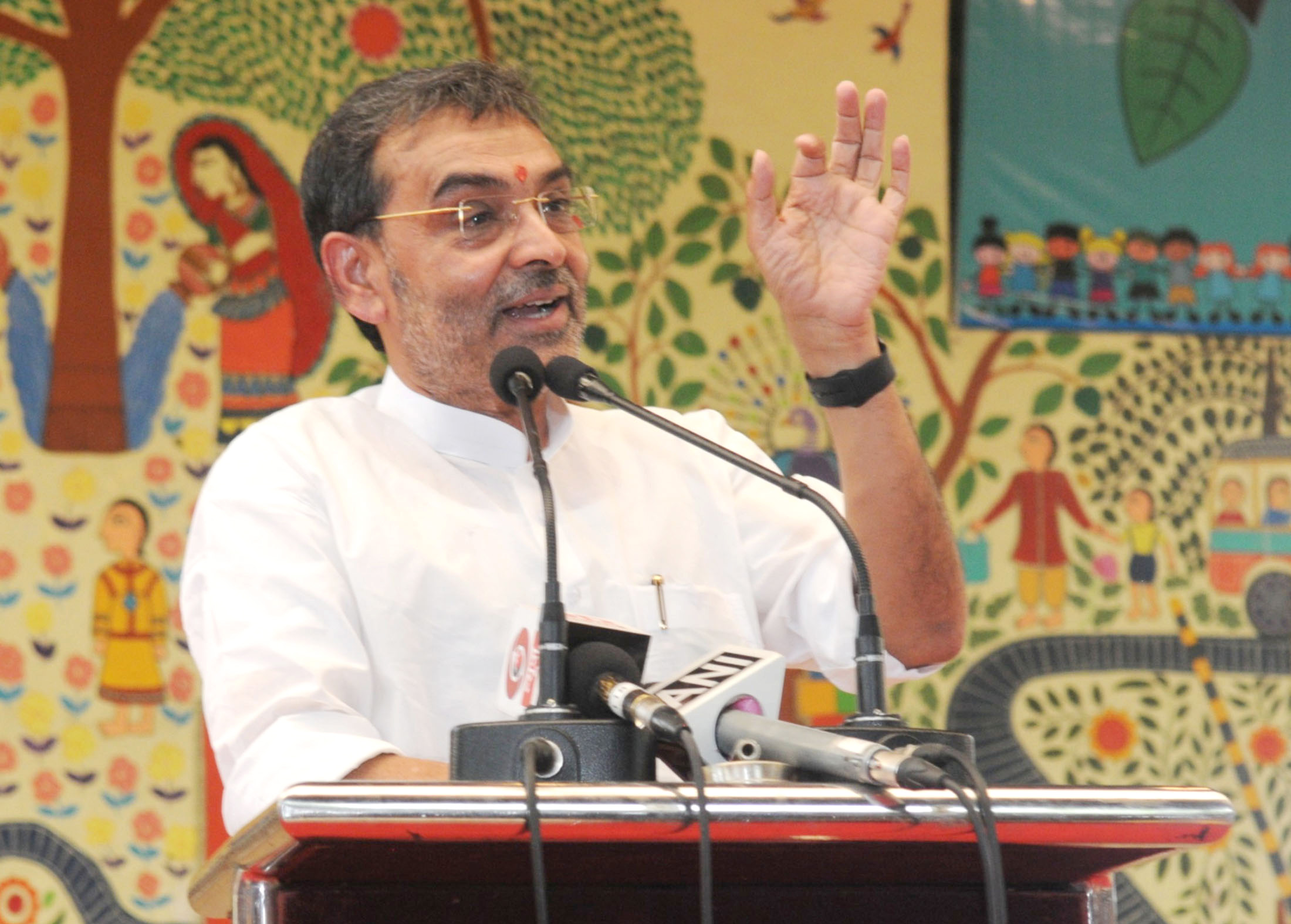
- Kushwaha in 2024

Member of Parliament, Rajya Sabha
- Incumbent
- Assumed office 27 August 2024
- Preceded by: Vivek Thakur
- Constituency: Bihar
- In office 8 July 2010 – 4 January 2013
- Preceded by: George Fernandes
- Succeeded by: K. C. Tyagi
- Constituency: Bihar

President of Rashtriya Lok Morcha
- Incumbent
- Assumed office 20 February 2023
- Preceded by: office established

Union Minister of State for Human Resource Development
- In office 26 May 2014 – 10 December 2018
- Prime Minister: Narendra Modi
- Preceded by: Shashi Tharoor

Member of Parliament, Lok Sabha
- In office 16 May 2014 – 23 May 2019
- Preceded by: Mahabali Singh
- Succeeded by: Mahabali Singh
- Constituency: Karakat

President of Rashtriya Lok Samata Party
- In office 13 March 2013 – 2021

Member of Bihar Legislative Council
- In office 2021 – 24 February 2023

Member of Bihar Legislative Assembly
- In office 2000–2005
- Preceded by: Tulsi Das Mehta
- Succeeded by: Achyutanand Singh
- Constituency: Jandaha

President of Rashtriya Samata Party
- In office 2007 – 29 November 2009

Personal details
- Born: Upendra Kumar Singh; 6 February 1960 (age 66) Vaishali district, Bihar, India
- Citizenship: Indian
- Party: Rashtriya Lok Morcha (2023—present)
- Other political affiliations: Janata Dal (United) (2004—2007, 2009—2013, 2021—2023); Rashtriya Lok Samata Party (2013—2021); Rashtriya Samata Party (2007—2009); Samata Party (2000—2004)
- Children: Deepak Prakash
- Education: Bihar University

Upendra Kumar Singh, commonly known as Upendra Kushwaha (born 6 February 1960) is an Indian politician, and a former Member of Bihar Legislative Council and Bihar Legislative Assembly. He has also served as Minister of State for Human Resources and Development in the Government of India. Kushwaha is a former Member of Parliament (MP) from the Karakat constituency in Rohtas district, Bihar, and a member of the Rajya Sabha. He was the founder and president of Rashtriya Samata Party (RSP), which merged into Janata Dal (United) (JDU) in 2009. Later, he formed Rashtriya Lok Samata Party (RLSP), which also merged with JD(U) in 2021. On 20 February 2023, Kushwaha resigned from all positions in JD(U) and formed his own party called Rashtriya Lok Morcha due to his political problems with JD(U) and Nitish Kumar. Kushwaha contested the Lok Sabha election of 2024 from Karakat constituency and finished at a distant third position. However, he was elected unopposed to Rajya Sabha in August 2024. He was re-elected in 2026.

== Early life ==
Upendra Kumar Singh was born to Muneshwar Singh and Muneshwari Devi on 6 February 1960 in Vaishali, Bihar, into a middle-class family. He graduated from Patna Science College and then gained a Master of Arts (MA) in Political Science from BR Ambedkar Bihar University, Muzaffarpur. Singh worked as a lecturer in the politics department of Samata College. He added 'Kushwaha' to his name at the suggestion of Nitish Kumar: the surname is associated with caste identity and was supposed to improve his political standing. Kushwaha had worked with Karpoori Thakur and Jay Prakash Narayan and, like the other significant leaders of the 1990s such as Nitish Kumar, Lalu Prasad Yadav and Ram Vilas Paswan, Kushwaha had socialist leanings. His father Muneshwar Singh was acquainted with Karpoori Thakur; he sent Kushwaha to work with Thakur as political worker during his graduation days. In his political life, Kushwaha considers former Deputy Chief Minister of Maharashtra Chhagan Bhujbal his political mentor. Kushwaha has spoken of his cordial relations with Bhujbal and Sharad Pawar; he credits Pawar for helping him during a difficult period in his political life.

== Political career ==
Upendra Kushwaha entered politics in 1985; from then until 1988, he was State General Secretary of Yuva Lok Dal. According to political analysts, Kushwaha enjoyed the support of voters of the Kushwaha caste in some districts of the Magadh and Shahabad divisions. A majority of political workers accompanying Upendra Kushwaha originate from this region. There are other districts where members of the Kushwaha caste who were not under his influence.

Kushwaha became National General-Secretary of Yuva Janata Dal from 1988 to 1993. He also worked as General-Secretary for Samata Party from 1994 to 2002. Kushwaha was Member of Bihar Legislative Assembly in 2000–2005 and was appointed Deputy Leader of Bihar Legislative Assembly. In March 2004, after the Lok Sabha election, Sushil Modi was elected to the Lok Sabha and the number of MLA of JD(U) exceeded those of the Bharatiya Janata Party (BJP). Kushwaha, who was a one time MLA then, was made leader of the opposition in Bihar Legislative Assembly.

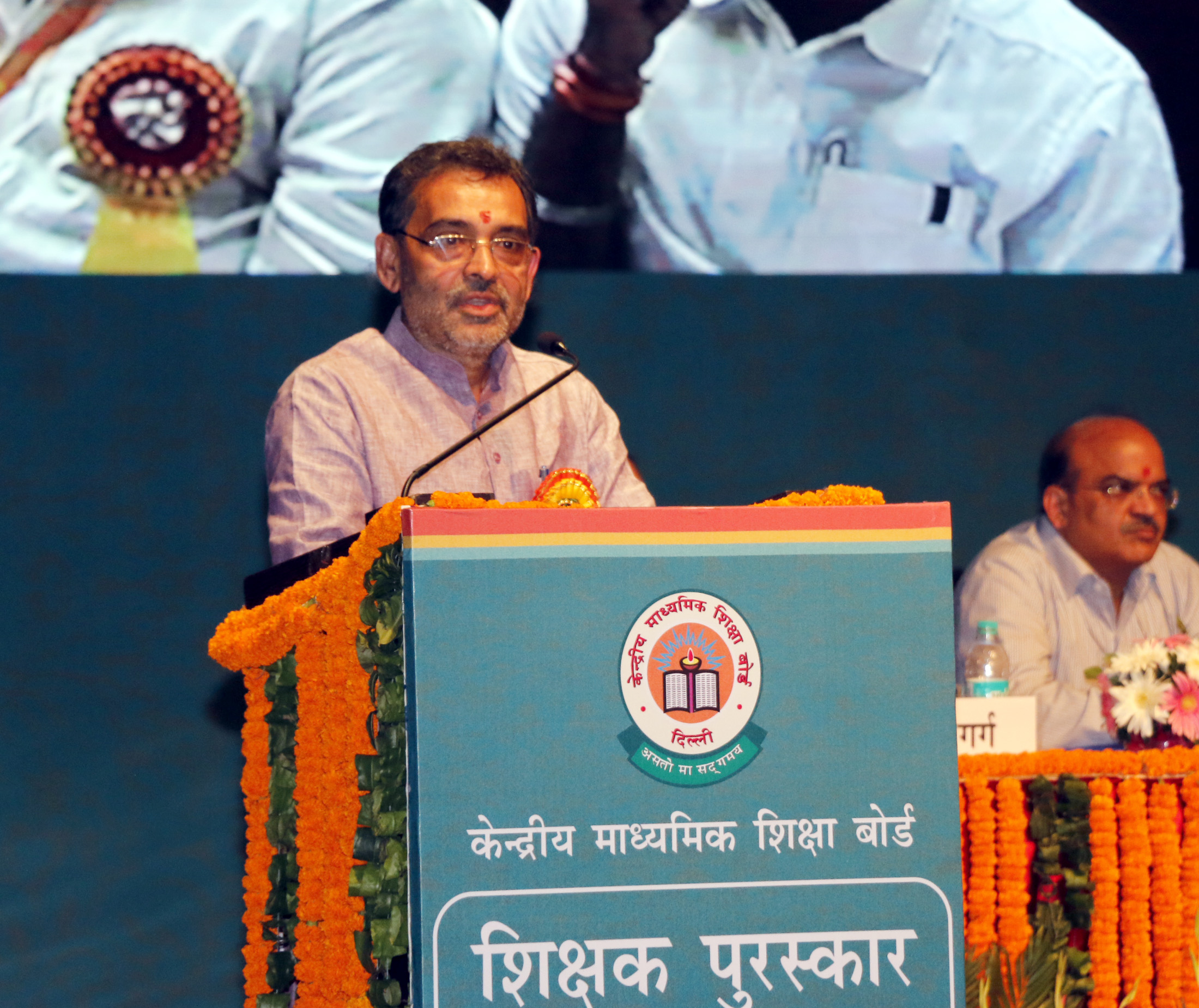
Upendra Kushwaha addressing a gathering in New Delhi on 3 September 2016.

Kushwaha started electoral politics in 2000, winning Jandaha constituency. He was dismissed from Janata Dal (United) in 2007. Kushwaha founded the Rashtriya Samata Party in February 2009 against the backdrop of alleged marginalisation of the Koeri caste and autocratic rule by the Bihar state government of Nitish Kumar. The formation of the party was supported by Chhagan Bhujbal, Deputy Chief Minister of Maharashtra. In November 2009, the Rashtriya Samata Party was merged into Janata Dal (United) due to an improved relationship between Kushwaha and Kumar.

On 4 January 2013, Upendra Kushwaha, who at the time was a Rajya Sabha member, resigned from Janata Dal (United), saying the Nitish model had failed and that the law-and-order situation was becoming as bad as it had been seven years before. He also said Nitish Kumar runs his government through autocratic means and that he had turned Janata Dal (United) into his "pocket organisation".

Kushwaha founded Rashtriya Lok Samata Party on 3 March 2013, and unveiled the party's name and flag at a rally at Gandhi Maidan. He contested the 2014 Lok Sabha elections as part of the National Democratic Alliance (NDA), which Narendra Modi led. Kushwaha was elected to Karakat constituency and was appointed Minister of State in Human Resource Development. In December 2018, Kushwaha resigned from the ministry and left the NDA, accusing Modi of not fulfilling his election promises regarding Bihar.

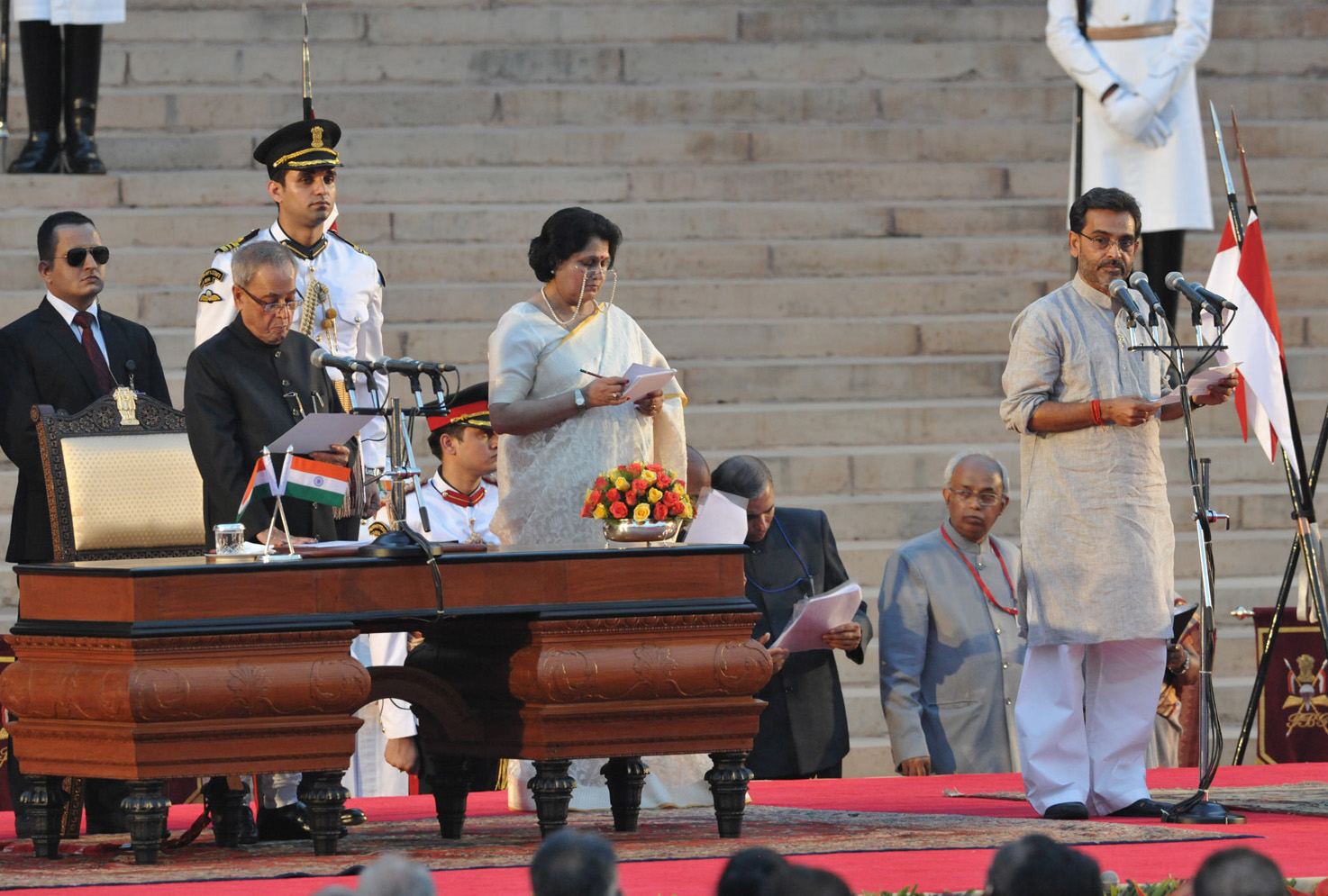
Shri Pranab Mukherjee administering the oath as Minister of State to Upendra Kushwaha at a swearing-in ceremony, at Rashtrapati Bhavan in New Delhi

Kushwaha indicated his discontent with the NDA leadership due to diminishing importance as an ally. Kushwaha's RLSP left the NDA alliance because it was not given appropriate seats in the 2019 Lok Sabha election. The NDA leadership was sceptical of Kushwaha's influence on members of the Koeri caste and believed they could win elections in Bihar without his support. According to political analysts of Bihar, Nitish Kumar holds considerable influence on the Koeri and Kurmi communities as a counter to which BJP had earlier selected Keshav Prasad Maurya as its Uttar Pradesh chief. The BJP was sure Nitish, who was now a BJP ally and had gained a considerable reputation in Bihar due to his development model, would be popular. Kushwaha then joined United Progressive Alliance (locally known as Mahagathbandhan), which included Rashtriya Janata Dal, Hindustani Awam Morcha, and Vikassheel Insaan Party. He contested the 2019 Lok Sabha election in the Karakat and Ujiyarpur constituencies. Kushwaha failed to win the seats. The grand alliance of parties under the leadership of Tejashwi Yadav failed to win any seats in Bihar in the 2019 Lok Sabha election.

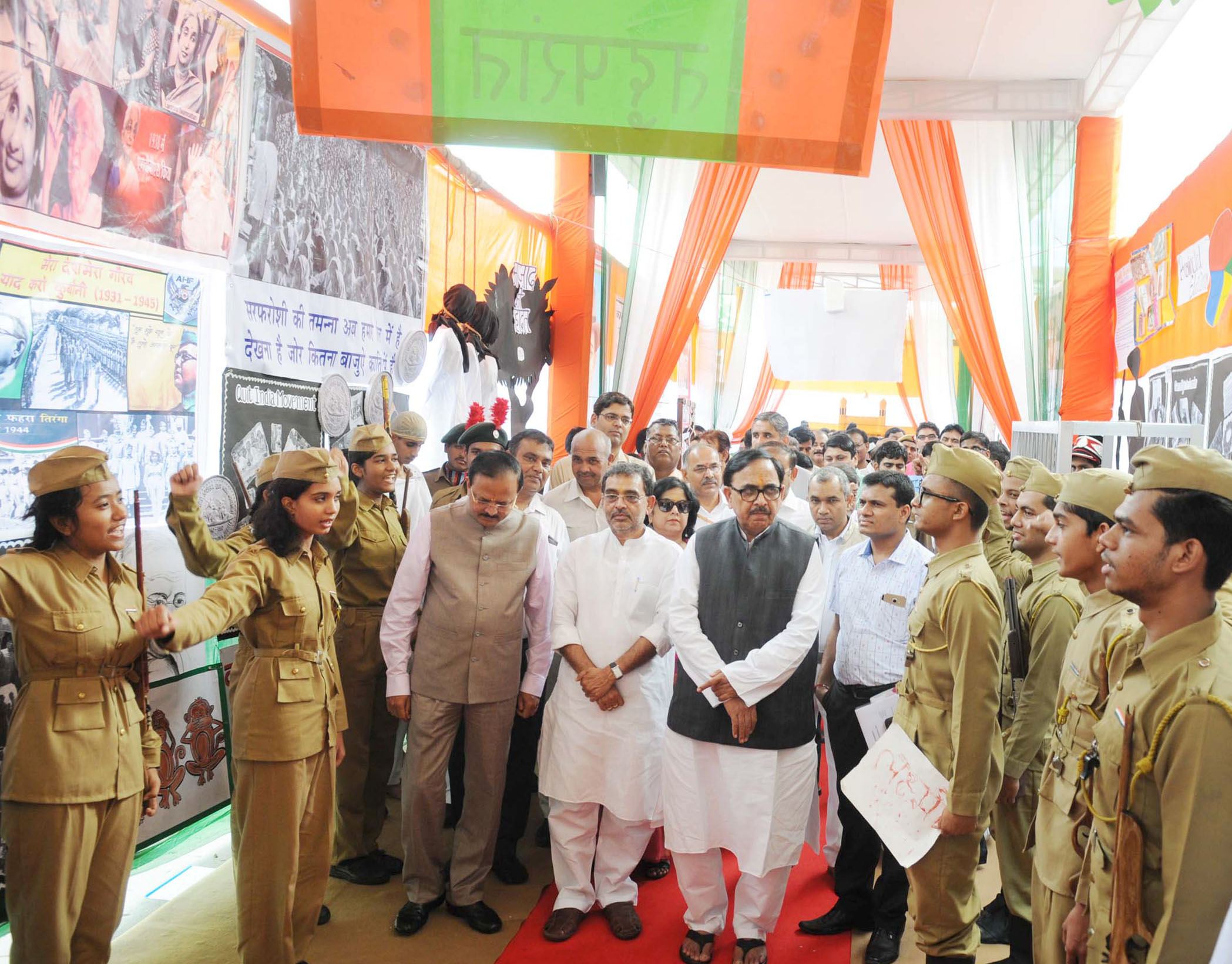
Upendra Kushwaha and Dr. Mahendra Nath Pandey and the Minister of State for Defence, Shri Subhash Ramrao Bhamre at the inauguration of the Festival-cum-Exhibition “Azadi 70 Saal - Yaad Karo Kurbani, Mera Desh Mera Gaurav”.

During the 2019 Lok Sabha election, Upendra Kushwaha's speech, in which he referred to the newly formed alliance of his party and Rashtriya Janata Dal (RJD) as "Kheer" sparked controversy. According to political analysts, RLSP represented Kushwahas, who are also called Koeris in Bihar, while RJD represents Yadavs. The traditional occupation of these castes is growing paddy (rice) and cattle domestication. Kushwaha's reference to Kheer was said to be the implicit indication of an alliance between two influential backward castes. This statement came at a convention organised in Shri Krishna Memorial Hall, Patna, to commemorate B. P. Mandal, on the occasion of his anniversary. Referring to public and political workers gathered there, he said:

kheer can be prepared with the milk from the Yadavs and rice from the Kushwahas ... (Note: Original: "Yaduvanshiyon ka dudh aur Kushwansiyon ka chawal mil jaye to kheer ban sakti hai") We will get the sugar from Brahmins, Tulsi from [RLSP Bihar chief Bhudev Choudhary], and can make delicious kheer with the dry-fruits from the backward classes and Dalits. Then we can relish the delicious kheer together.

After losing in 2019 Lok Sabha elections, Kushwaha warned NDA leadership if the election results deteriorated, blood will flow on streets. Later in a notice from Election Commission of India, he said his intention was not the provoking of violence.

In September 2020, prior to the Bihar Legislative Assembly election, Upendra Kushwaha's party RLSP left the RJD-and Congress-led coalition that was formed during the 2019 Lok Sabha election to counter the National Democratic Alliance (NDA) in Bihar. Kushwaha announced the formation of an alliance called the Grand Democratic Secular Front (GDSF) in partnership with Bahujan Samaj Party (BSP). The GDSF contested all 243 seats in the Bihar Assembly against three more political fronts: the NDA, which included JD (U) and BJP; UPA (locally known as Grand Alliance or Mahagathbandhan), which included RJD, Congress and Vikassheel Insaan Party; and an alliance of small parties that was led by Jan Adhikar Party. Kushwaha cited the unacceptability of the leadership of Tejashwi Yadav as the reason for his separation from the "Grand Alliance".

The GSDF suffered a serious setback: its only success was AIMIM winning five seats in Muslim-dominated areas of Bihar—particularly Simanchal—and BSP winning one seat. The allies had obtained fewer votes than Kushwaha's RLSP, which secured 1.77% of the vote, and failed to win any seats. The RLSP polled well in a number of constituencies, including Dinara and Saffron.

Kushwaha left Janata Dal (United) on two occasions but after the split of 2013, he lost much support and the Rashtriya Lok Samata Party suffered massive election defeats, most notably in the 2019 Lok Sabha election and the 2020 assembly election. The decline of support of the Kushwaha caste also resulted in setbacks for JD(U), which was reduced to 43 seats in the 2020 election to the Bihar Legislative Assembly. This led to RLSP being merged into its parent JD(U) and Kushwaha was made the party's parliamentary board president. Soon after his induction into JD(U), Kushwaha was nominated to the Bihar Legislative Council, the upper house of the Bihar Legislature.

=== Post-2022 anti-coalition politics ===
Kushwaha engaged in anti-coalition politics against the Mahagathbandhan in 2023, when he challenged the leadership of Tejashwi Yadav as the successor to Nitish Kumar. In several press conferences, he said Janata Dal (United) (JDU) had weakened and there was need to strengthen it again by reviving the party's core support base. Kushwaha also demanded a greater role for the Koeri caste in the electoral politics of Bihar. He said the incumbent Chief Minister Nitish Kumar and Deputy CM Tejaswi Yadav had grabbing the political rights of other Other Backward Castes (OBCs) and that after the Yadavs and Kurmis, the premiership of Bihar should pass into the hands of a Kushwaha leader, considering the leader of these three castes together launched the political party Triveni Sangh in the 1930s. He also said Extremely Backward Castes, which have been neglected in electoral politics, should play an active role, and urged Kumar and Yadav to take steps to push them forward.

Amidst speculation he would join the Bhartiya Janata Party (BJP), Kushwaha said he would remain in JDU, working towards strengthening it. Despite the anti-coalition statements made by Kushwaha, JDU did not try to warn him or oust him from the party. Nitish Kumar left the decision whether to stay in the JDU or resign to Kushwaha. Kumar, in a statement to media, asked Kushwaha to settle the dispute, if any, through conciliation within the party. According to political analysts, the declaration of Tejaswi Yadav as the successor of Nitish Kumar ended Kushwaha's hopes, making him contest the choice of Yadav over him. This made Kushwaha worry about JDU's future, which according to him was on the verge of decline and such a step would seal the party's fate.

Kushwaha's continuous attack on Nitish Kumar's decision to promote Tejashwi Yadav as his successor did not bring any action by the JDU leadership but the party's national president Lalan Singh said in a press statement that Kushwaha is no longer the "president of parliamentary board of the JDU", the position to which Kushwaha was appointed after merging his party RLSP into the ruling JDU.

=== Attack on convoy and formation of new party ===
Amidst a political crisis in the state, in which Kushwaha was important factor, Kushawa's convoy of vehicles was attacked during a visit to Bhojpur. The attackers belonged to an organisation called "Kushvanshi Sena" and had ideological conflict with Kushwaha. The Sena members said they showed black flags to the convoy and Kushwaha's supporters and political activists assaulted them.

Kushwaha resigned from JDU and announced the formation of a new party called Rashtriya Lok Janata Dal on 20 February 2023. This party was formed after a merger of his trusted aides in JDU and those in his social-reform organisation "Mahatma Phule Samata Parishad". Kushwaha had called a meeting of his aides in JDU and members of Mahatma Phule Samata Parishad in Patna on 19 and 20 February, planning to merge them to form his new political entity.

=== Virasat Bachao Yatra ===
Soon after formation of Rashtriya Lok Janata Dal, Kushwaha announced the launch of "Virasat Bachao Yatra", a statewide tour that included important places in Bihar and connecting with ground-level political workers to gain support against the Nitish Kumar government. The yatra, in its first phase, started from Bhitiharwa Village of West Champaran district and covered Muzaffarpur, Sitamarhi, Bajpatti, Madhubani, Araria, Madhepura, Samastipur and Saran district. The second phase of this tour was planned to cover Nalanda, Sheikhpura, Bhagalpur, Nawada, Gaya, Rohtas, Sasaram, Bhojpur, and Arwal districts.

=== 2024 Indian general elections ===
Before 2024 Indian general elections (Lok Sabha elections), there was a buzz over whether Kushwaha's RLJD would become a part of National Democratic Alliance led by Bharatiya Janata Party or not. According to some of the senior Bharatiya Janata Party leaders, the BJP was not solely dependent on Kushwaha to gain support among the members of numerically strong Koeri caste of Bihar, to which latter belonged. It had raised Samrat Chaudhary from the same caste group as its Bihar unit president, as the BJP leadership believed that sole reliance on Kushwaha was not enough. This believe emanated from the performance of Kushwaha in 2015 Bihar Legislative Assembly elections, when, his party was successful in winning only two assembly seats out of twenty three seats contested by it as an ally of BJP. It was hence unable to break the grand social coalition formed by coming together of Lalu Prasad Yadav and Nitish Kumar together in 2015 Bihar Assembly elections.

In 2024 seat distribution of National Democratic Alliance, Rashtriya Lok Morcha (earlier known as Rashtriya Lok Janata Dal) was given one parliamentary constituency to contest. It was stipulated in media that Kushwaha wanted more seats and thus he was pacified by the BJP leadership with one seat in Bihar Legislative Council.

Kushwaha faced a tough electoral contest as Bhojpuri singer and actor Pawan Singh, who was earlier given the symbol of Bharatiya Janata Party and made a candidate from Asansol Lok Sabha constituency decided to contest the election from Karakat Lok Sabha constituency. Singh denied the proposal of Bharatiya Janata Party and decided to contest as independent candidate from Karakat; he was later expelled by BJP for contesting against National Democratic Alliance candidate Kushwaha. However, Singh continued his electoral campaigns with large number of stage shows involving musical concerts of Bhojpuri singers and actors. It was speculated before the election that he will be able to cut a large number of votes of the Forward Castes, specially his own Rajput caste, which had been transferred to NDA candidate Kushwaha in his absence.

After the results were declared, it was reported that Kushwaha was pushed to third position with over two lakh votes polled in the favour of Pawan Singh. The drifting of Rajput votes away from the NDA candidate led to victory of Communist Party of India (Marxist-Leninist) Liberation politician Raja Ram Singh Kushwaha from the Karakat seat. The loss of Upendra Kushwaha also affected caste equation in the whole Shahabad region as the Koeri people voted against BJP and Rajput candidates in the constituencies in the vicinity of Karakat. It was reported that there was palpable anger amongst the members of Koeri caste on Pawan Singh contesting as independent candidate from Karakat against Kushwaha. The BJP lost Arrah, Aurangabad, Sasaram, Buxar seats with its veteran Rajput leaders R. K. Singh and Sushil Kumar Singh getting defeated by fair margin of votes.

Following the 2024 Indian general elections, Kushwaha was nominated as the candidate of National Democratic Alliance to the Rajya Sabha, the upper-house of Indian parliament.

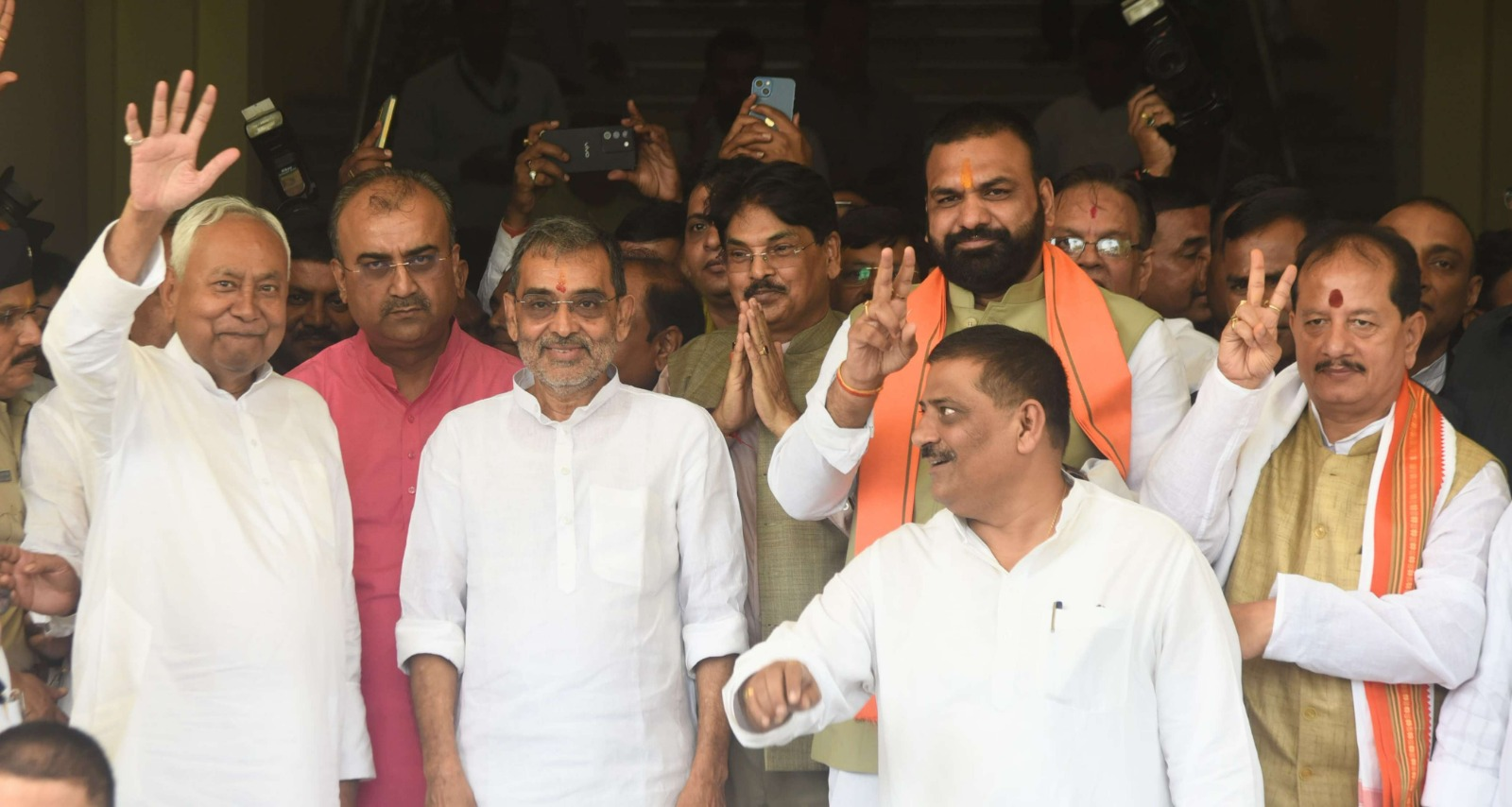
Nitish Kumar and Samrat Chaudhary participating in Rajya Sabha nomination of Upendra Kushwaha in August 2024.

As per its predetermined plan, National Democratic Alliance nominated Upendra Kushwaha along with Naman Kumar Mishra for Rajya Sabha Bypolls on 21 August 2024. Their nomination was attended by Bihar Chief Minister Nitish Kumar and Deputy Chief Minister Samrat Chaudhary.

=== 2025 Bihar Legislative Assembly elections ===
In the seat sharing arrangement of National Democratic Alliance, Kushwaha's newly formed Rashtriya Lok Morcha was given six seats to contest. However, only four of his six candidates were able to register victory, which included his wife Snehlata Kushwaha from Sasaram Assembly constituency. This made RLM claimant of one ministerial berth in the Tenth Nitish Kumar ministry. However, Kushwaha chose his son in place of his victorious candidates to become Minister of Panchayati Raj in Nitish Kumar cabinet. This resulted in dissent and rebellion in his party with state president Mahendra Kushwaha and vice president Jitendra Nath resigning from party along with several other members.

Kushwaha was elected for a second consecutive term to Rajya Sabha in 2026.

== Relationship with Nitish Kumar ==
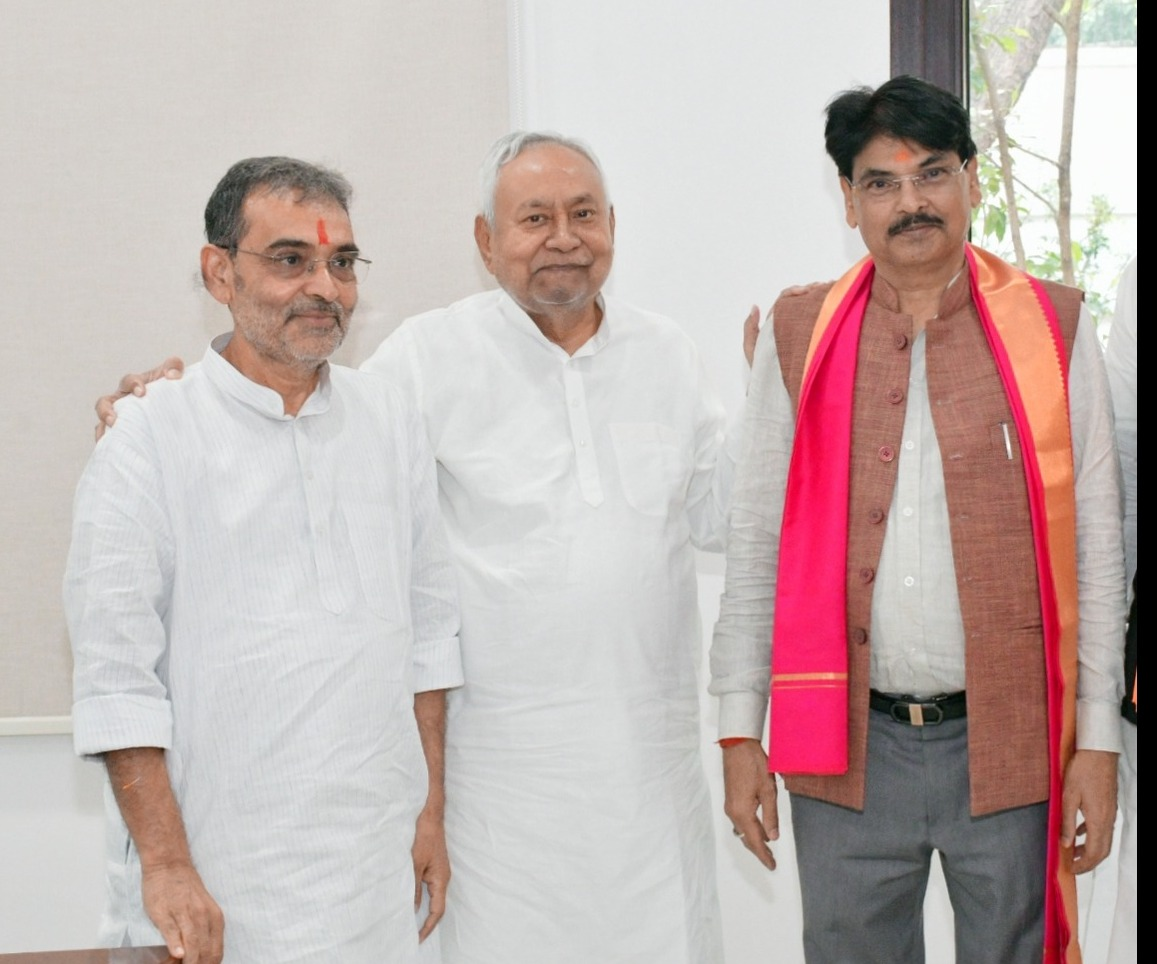
Kushwaha with Nitish Kumar on 27 August 2024, after getting elected to the Rajya Sabha as the president of Rashtriya Lok Morcha and a candidate of National Democratic Alliance.

In his early political career, Kushwaha was a favourite of Nitish Kumar, who invested a lot in him and made him leader of opposition in Bihar Legislative Assembly. Kushwaha, however, lost his assembly election in 2005 despite support from Kumar. According to political analysts, this was an attempt on part of Kumar to create a strong Kurmi-Koeri alliance. After his loss of 2005, Kushwaha blamed Kumar for his defeat and left JDU to join the Nationalist Congress Party, becoming its state-unit chief. In 2010, after returning to JDU, Kushwaha in JDU, Kumar sent him to Rajya Sabha; however, Kushwaha later resigned and formed the Rashtriya Lok Samata Party in 2013.

Kushwaha's RLSP fought the 2014 Lok Sabha election in alliance with the BJP and won the three seats it was allotted. In reward, he was made Union Minister in Narendra Modi's first cabinet. When Nitish Kumar, who contested the 2014 Lok Sabha election alone without being part of the BJP-led National Democratic Alliance (NDA), returned to the NDA, Kushwaha was overlooked by NDA leadership as they focused more on Nitish. Despite performing poorly in the 2019 Lok Sabha and 2020 Bihar Assembly elections, in the latter of which Kushwaha formed his GDSF, Kumar invited Kushwaha to merge his RLSP into JDU. This was done because JDU observed a shifting away of voters away from Kushwaha's caste, and in more than 12 seats in some parts of Bihar, RSLP candidates led a defeat of JDU candidates.

In 2021, Kushwaha merged his RLSP into JDU and Kumar appointed him Parliamentary Board chairman. Kushwaha, however, later said Kumar was not giving him appropriate time to discuss party affairs. He also said the party was weakening from the inside. Earlier, when Kushwaha was JDU's parliamentary board chairman, he consistently defended Kumar from attack by opposition leaders. Kushwaha reacted sharply to the statement of Rashtriya Janata Dal leader Shivanand Tiwari, who said Nitish Kumar once told him he wanted to open an Ashram and teach political workers, an indication of Kumar's retirement from politics. Kushwaha defended Kumar and in media briefing, he said Nitish should work more and the nation still wanted his service.

After Kushwaha's tussle with JDU's leadership became public in 2023, and a picture of some BJP leaders meeting him in hospital was aired, rumours of him leaving the JDU reappeared. When asked about Kushwaha's possible defection from JDU, due to his closeness with the BJP, Nitish Kumar told media "they should ask Kushwaha, what he wants" and"tell [Kushwaha] to talk to me."

== Ideology ==
=== On Reservation ===
In 2016, while he was serving as Union Minister for Human Resource Development, Kushwaha expressed his views on reservation in the private sector for Other Backward Classes. In a rally organised in commemoration of social reformer Jyotiba Phule by former MP Raj Kumar Saini, Kushwaha said the dominant section of society have influence in all parts of the administration and the OBCs have no representation in some core sectors of the economy. Saini supported Kushwaha and demanded organisations working for the welfare of OBCs should speak against the under-representation of OBCs in some of the key institutions.

In 2022, when he was serving as the Parliamentary Board president of Janata Dal (United), Kushwaha accused the Bhartiya Janata Party (BJP) of plotting to destroy the caste-based reservation for Other Backward Castes. He also criticised the BJP's key leadership for remaining silent on the issue of conducting a nationwide "caste-based census", which according to Kushwaha, while he was serving as Union Minister as a BJP ally, the BJP's senior leaders promised to conduct.

=== On Farm Bills ===
Kushwaha's Rashtriya Lok Samata Party (RLSP) organised Kisan Choupals against the 2020 Farm Bills. These village-level conferences were aimed at making farmers aware of the provisions of the Farm Laws brought by National Democratic Alliance government in 2021. According to RSLP political activists, the laws were not in interest of small farmers. Kushwaha announced the participation of his political workers in the all-India protest organised by farmers in Delhi if the bills were not taken back. Kushwaha asked the Narendra Modi government to take the bills back because they were supposed to serve the interest of big farmers and the corporations, and were detrimental to small and marginal farmers.

=== On liquor ban ===
In 2016, the Government of Bihar under Nitish Kumar passed a bill in the Bihar Legislative Assembly to ban the consumption of alcohol in the state. Severe punishment were imposed on those found guilty. In 2022, Kushwaha in a press statement spoke against the state government's liquor policy. He was opposed to the way the ban was being implemented. Kushwaha accused government officials of colluding with alcohol suppliers and asked the people to volunteer to make the prohibition successful.

=== Caste census ===
Kushwaha was an ardent supporter of the project of Bihar government for enumeration of population of various caste groups residing within the state. It was an ambitious project and first such large scale exercise to know the strength of individual castes after 1931. However after the results of the caste survey were published on 2 October 2023, he was among the leaders to term it as fake and manipulated survey. The survey lowered the strength of many caste groups which were considered more preponderant in the state. Soon after the results, he commented that the data were collected in haste and also alleged that even his own family was not counted and no one from the side of government came to his house to ask about his caste. Kushwaha also termed the report to be half baked as the data of only population was published on 2 October. He demanded that the socio-economic profile of various castes should also be kept in public domain as it will help government to formulate policies to uplift them.

== Tenure as Minister of State (MoS) for Education ==
=== Developmental initiatives ===
As union minister, Kushwaha worked in the area of improvement of education by sanctioning a number of Kendriya Vidyalayas across the country in his capacity. Two of those were sanctioned in his native state of Bihar. Kushwaha sanctioned the funds required for setting up of KVs for ensuring quality education and even announced that his party will put pressure on the Government of Bihar through protests, to expedite the process of establishment of KVs, if the land for it was not allocated by the state government in time.

=== Protest against collegium system ===
While serving as Minister of State (Human resource development), now called Ministry of State (Education), Kushwaha raised the issue of reforming the Collegium System of appointment to the higher judiciary. Highlighting the humble beginnings of Prime Minister Narendra Modi and incumbent president Ram Nath Kovind, he asked why the opportunity to become a judge of the higher judiciary should be closed for communities that are considered a "weaker section". Kushwaha also said the Supreme Court of India judges worry about their successors and practising nepotism. Following the demand, the RSLP organised a discussion of reforms of the Collegium System in ten state capitals, beginning with New Delhi.

To support the reservation in the judiciary for the "weaker section", Kushwaha also launched a campaign called "Halla Bol Darwaja Khol Campaign". At the same time, an anti-reservation protest was being organised across Bihar and while travelling to East Champaran to meet Prime Minister Narendra Modi, Kushwaha was greeted with protests by anti-reservationists. According to police, one person was arrested in connection with the misbehaviour with Kushwaha and sixty protesters remained out of reach.

=== Movement for educational reforms ===
According to Kushwaha, the Rashtriya Janata Dal's (RJD) 15-year rule in Bihar is responsible for the poor conditions of educational institutions. In a convention organised by his RLSP party in Rajgir during his tenure as Union Minister, he put many demands before the Nitish Kumar government to rectify the state's education system. The demands were aimed at the development of lower as well as higher educational institutions.

Kushwaha has demanded quality education in Indian villages. According to him, 90% of those who are in need of education live in villages, where there has been severe degradation in quality of government schools. He also lauded the Central Board of Secondary Education for maintaining a decent quality of education across the country.

In 2016, Kushwaha inaugurated the new infrastructure and building for the All India Council for Technical Education. At the inauguration meeting, he expressed concern over engineers being paid a minimum salary of ₹10,000 to ₹12,000 in the country after graduating from private technical institutions. He urged the creation of a system in which the companies would visit campuses to select meritorious engineers.

In 2019, RLSP party workers, under leadership of Kushwaha and other senior leaders, conducted a march towards Bihar's Raj Bhavan, pressing for educational reforms but Bihar Police initiated a lathi charge to stop them from reaching their destination. In this incident, Kushwaha was injured and was admitted into Patna Medical College and Hospital (PMCH). According to General Secretary of RLSP, Satyanand Prasad Dangi and former MP Bhudeo Choudhary also received serious injuries. Soon after this incident, Maharashtra leader Chhagan Bhujbal met Kushwaha at PMCH and criticised the NDA government of Bihar for the lathi charge. He also said the government had plotted to kill Kushwaha. Pappu Yadav, who also met Kushwaha in PMCH, also supported these allegations.

== Electoral performance ==
=== Lok Sabha ===
Election	Constituency	Party	Result	Vote	Opposite candidate	Party	Vote
2014	Karakat	RLSP	Won	42.90%	Kanti Singh	RJD	29.58%
2019	Karakat	RLSP	Lost	37.19%	Mahabali Singh	JDU	47.21%
2019	Ujiarpur	RLSP	Lost	27.51%	Nityanand Rai	BJP	56.11%
2024	Karakat	RLM	Lost	24.61%	Raja Ram Kushwaha	CPIMLL	36.89%

=== Rajya Sabha ===
Position	Party	Constituency	From	To	Tenure
Member of Parliament, Rajya Sabha (1st Term)	JD(U)	Bihar	8 July 2010	4 January 2013	2 years, 180 days
Member of Parliament, Rajya Sabha (2nd Term)	RLM	Bihar	28 August 2024	9 April 2026	1 year, 224 days
Member of Parliament, Rajya Sabha (3rd Term)	RLM	Bihar	10 April 2026	9 April 2032	5 years, 365 days

=== Bihar Legislative Assembly ===
Election	Constituency	Party	Result	Vote	Opposite candidate	Party	Vote
2000	Jandaha	SAP	Won	33.47%	Achyutanand Singh	Ind	29.57%
2005	Jandaha	JDU	Lost	21.75%	Achyutanand Singh	LJP	38.64%

== Gallery ==
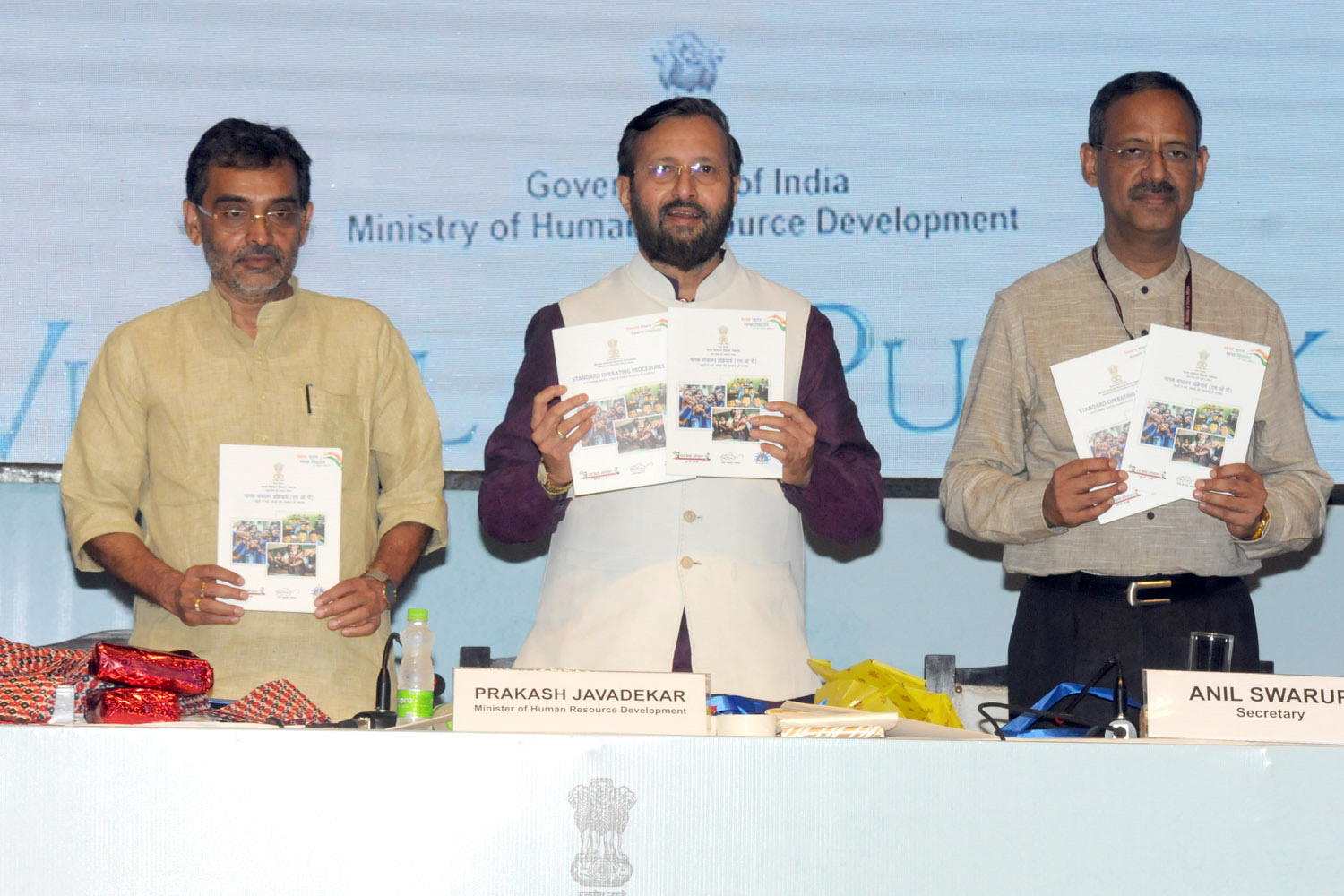
Upendra Kushwaha and Prakash Javadekar releasing the publication, at the presentation ceremony of the National level Swachh Vidyalaya Puraskar, 2016–17 to the 172 selected Government Schools in the country, in New Delhi.

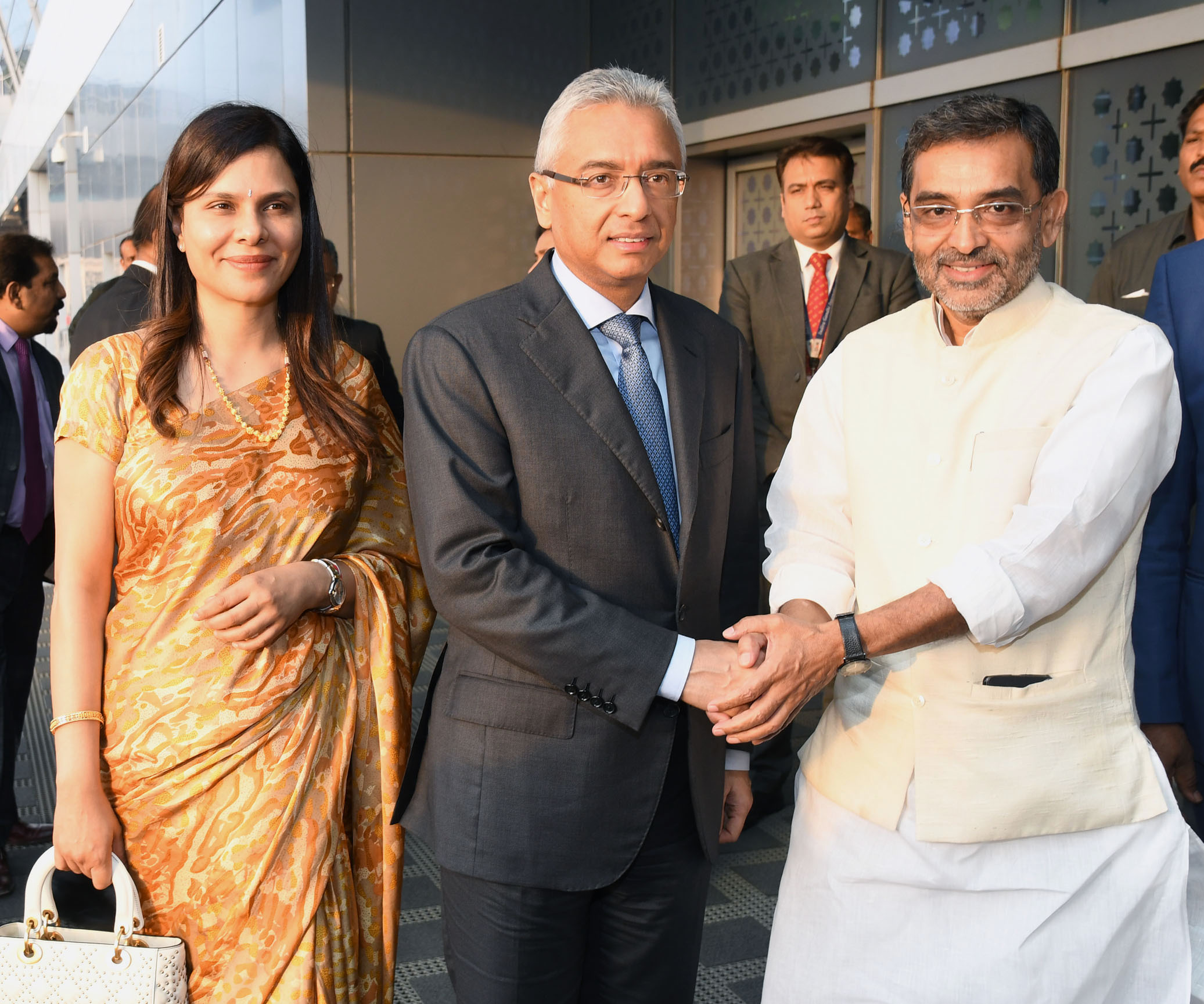
Pravind Kumar Jugnauth and Mrs. Kobita Ramdanee-Jugnauth being received by the Minister of State for Human Resource Development, Shri Upendra Kushwaha, on their arrival at IGI Airport, in New Delhi.jpg

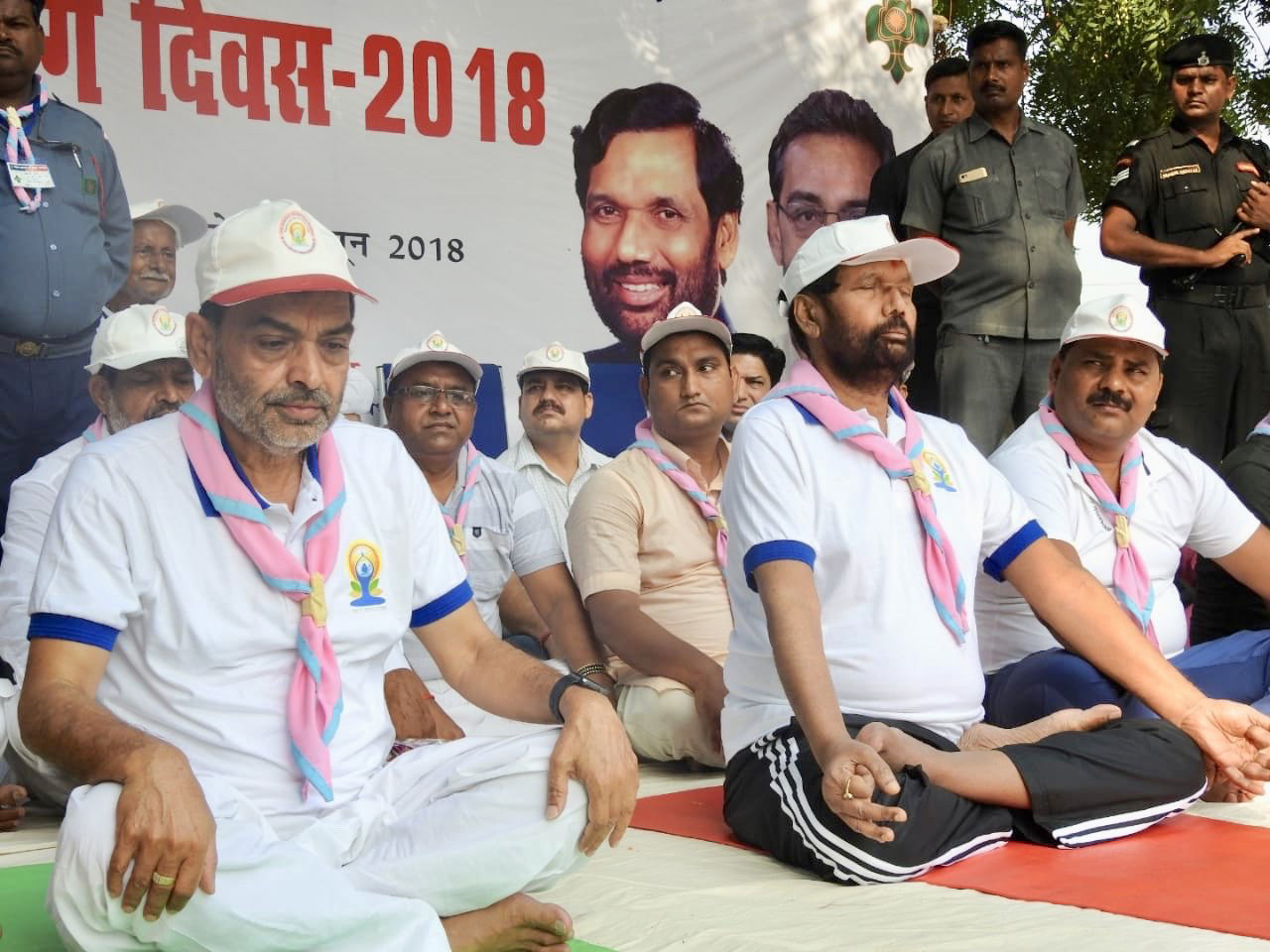
Ram Vilas Paswan and the Minister of State for Human Resource Development, Shri Upendra Kushwaha perform Yoga, on the occasion of the 4th International Day of Yoga 2018, in Hajipur, Bihar.

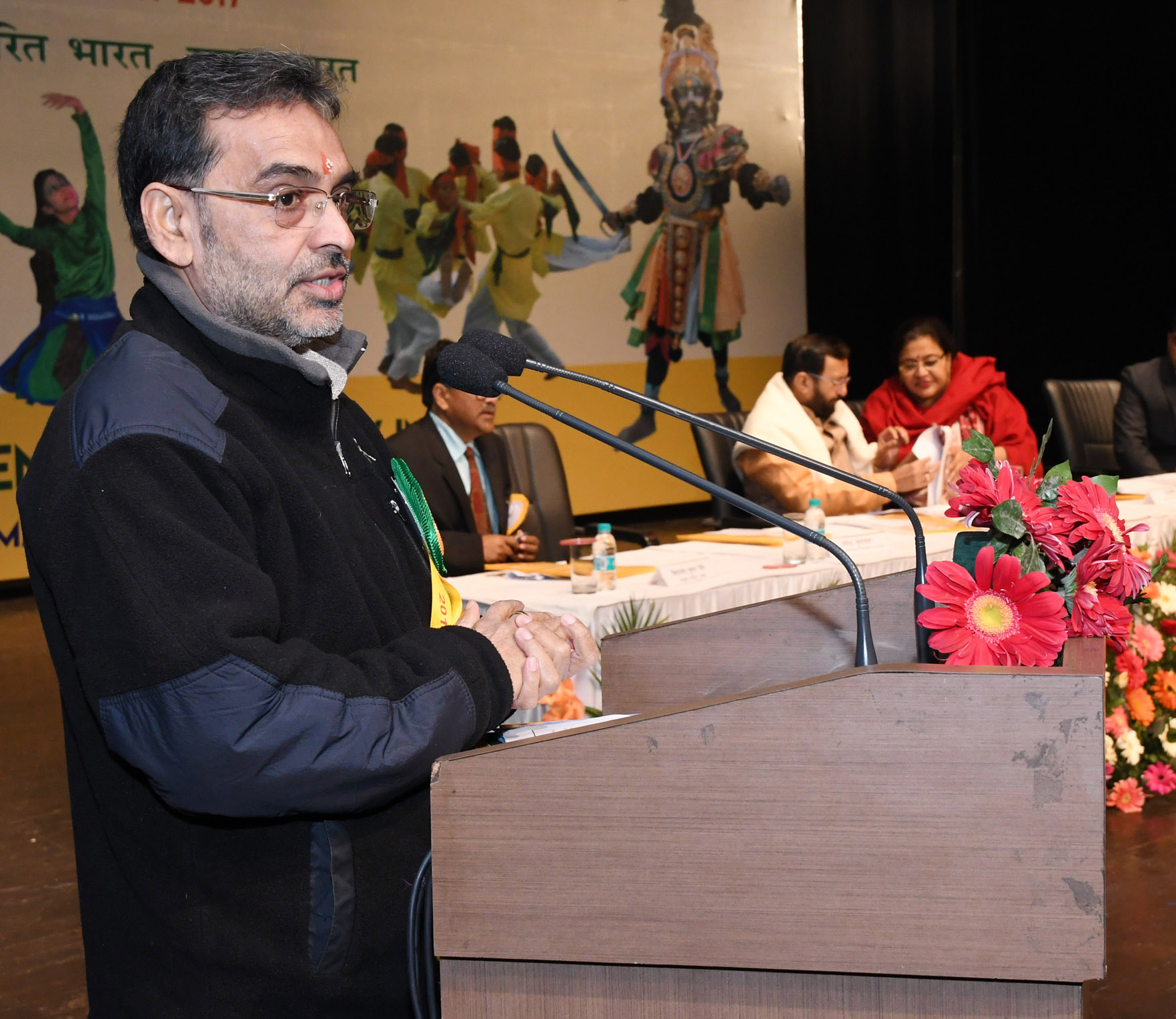
Minister of State for Human Resource Development, Shri Upendra Kushwaha addressing at the inauguration of the Navodaya National Integration Meet and Award Function 2016–17, in New Delhi on 17 January 2017.

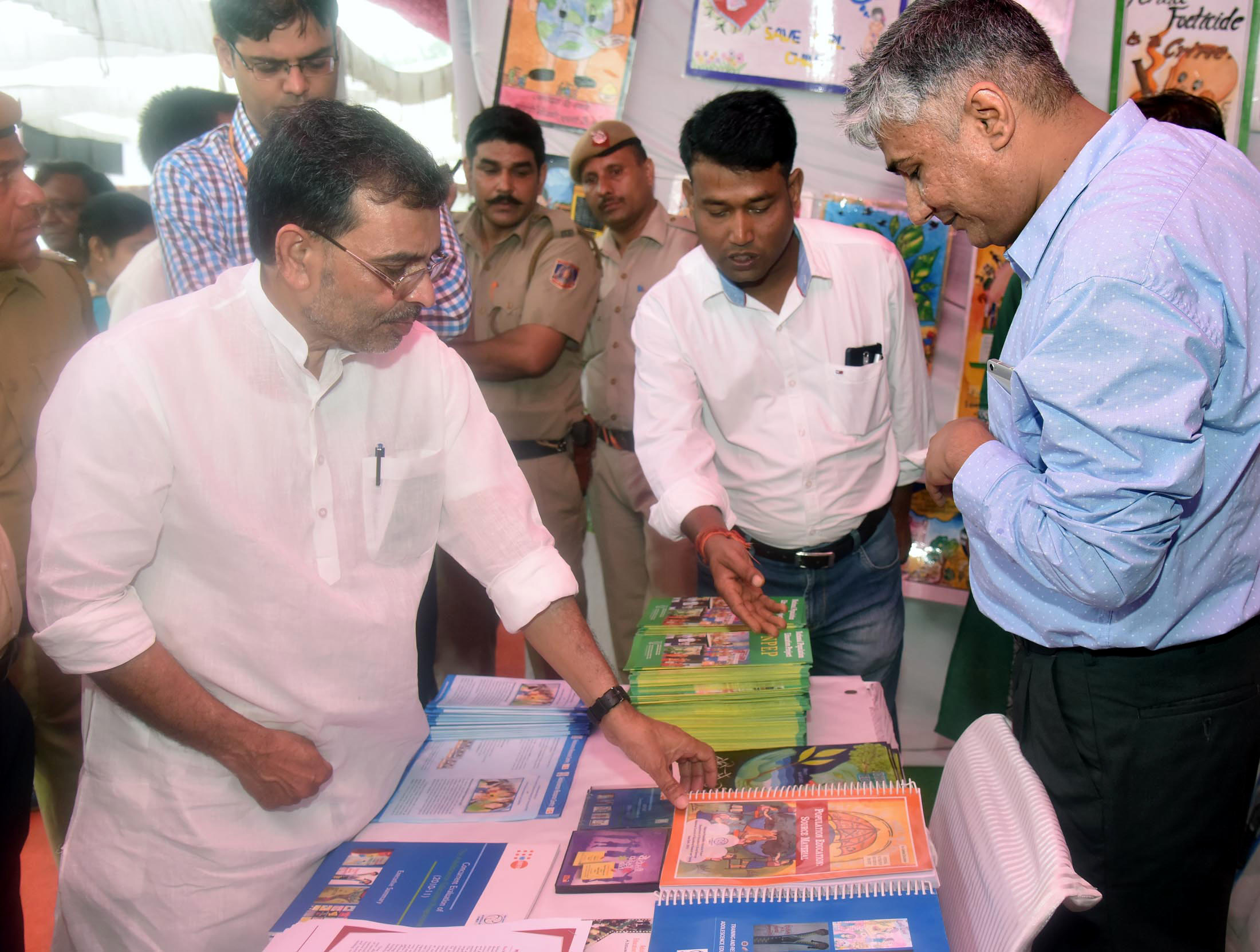
The Minister of State for Human Resource Development, Shri Upendra Kushwaha visiting an exhibition, at the 56th NCERT foundation day celebrations, in New Delhi on 1 September 2016.

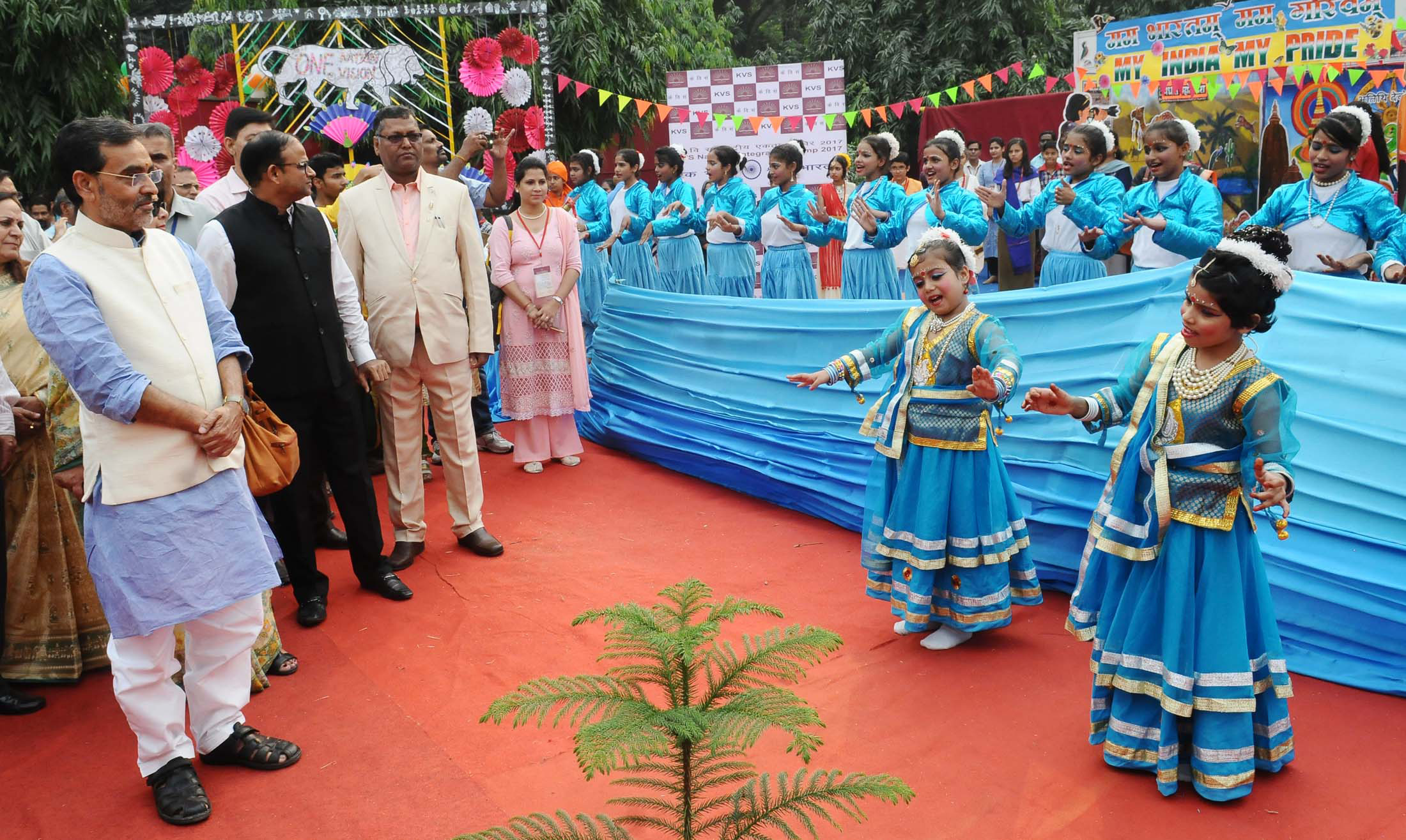
The Minister of State for Human Resource Development, Shri Upendra Kushwaha visiting after inaugurating the KVS Rashtriya Ekta Shivir-2017, Ek Bharat-Shreshth Bharat, in New Delhi on 31 October 2017.

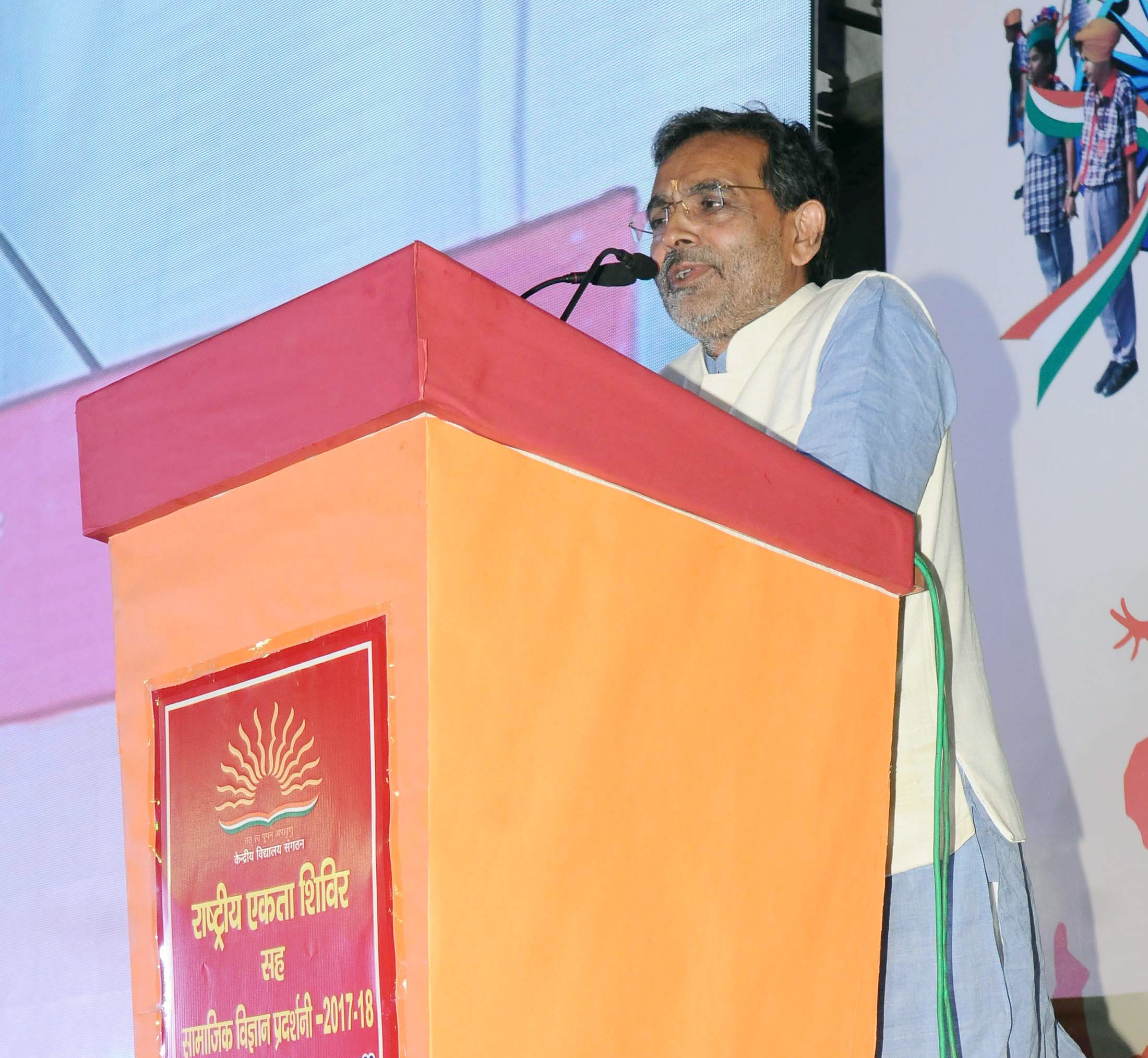
The Minister of State for Human Resource Development, Shri Upendra Kushwaha addressing at the inauguration of the KVS Rashtriya Ekta Shivir-2017, Ek Bharat-Shreshth Bharat, in New Delhi on 31 October 2017.

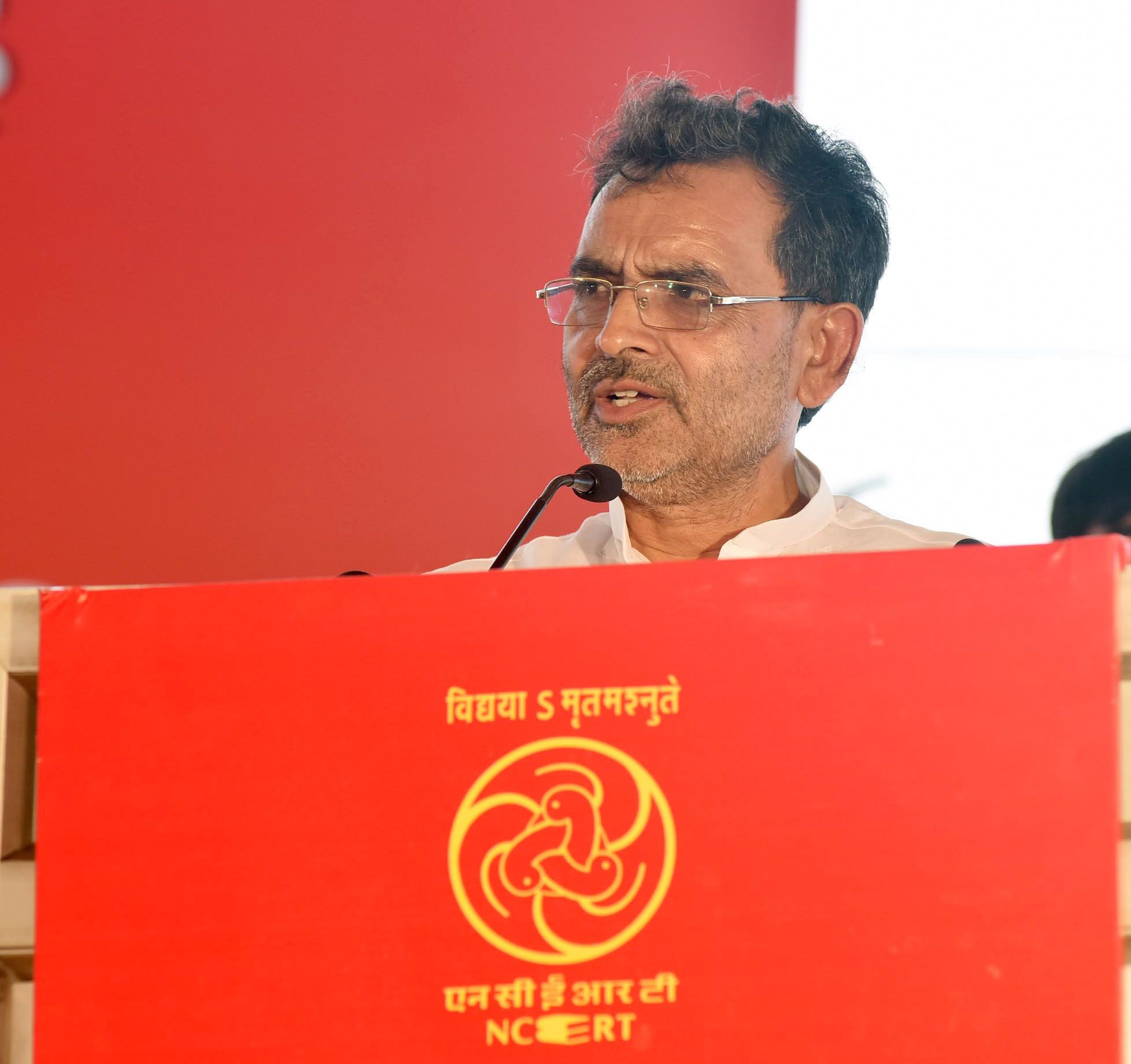
The Minister of State for Human Resource Development, Shri Upendra Kushwaha addressing at the 56th NCERT foundation day celebrations, in New Delhi on 1 September 2016.

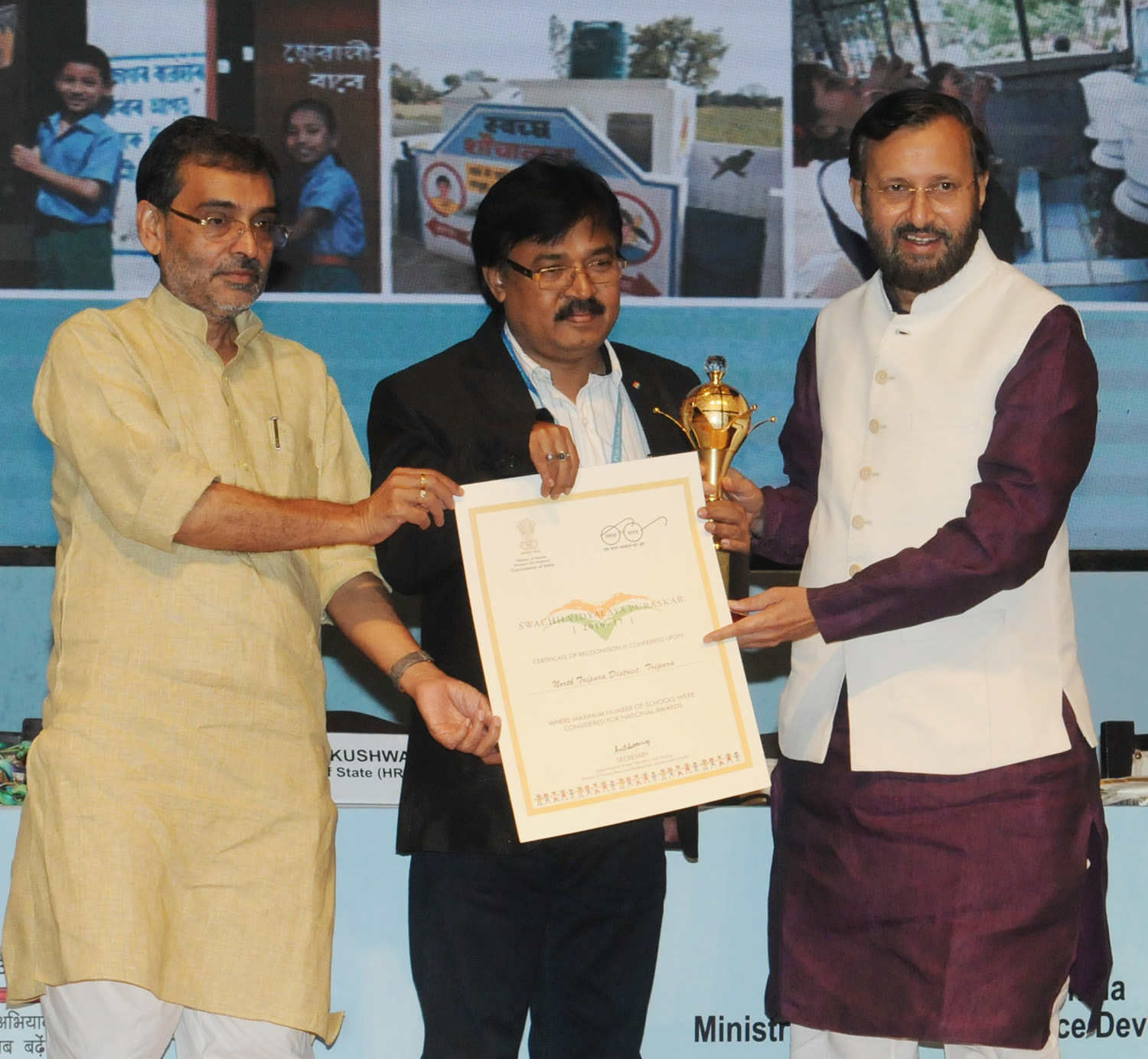
The Union Minister of state for Human Resource Development, Shri Upendra Kushwaha presented the National level Swachh Vidyalaya Puraskar, 2016–17 to the 172 selected Government Schools in the country, at a function, in New Delhi.

== See also ==
- Rati Lal Prasad Verma
- Sumitra Devi
- Ajit Kumar Mehta
- Ramdeo Verma
- Baidyanath Prasad Mahto
- Chandradeo Prasad Verma
- Upendra Nath Verma
- Ajit Kushwaha
- Laxmi Narayan Mehta
- Laxmi Mahato Koiri
- Loknath Mahto
- List of politicians from Bihar

== Footnotes ==
Party political offices
Preceded by	Leader of the Rashtriya Lok Samata Party in the 16th Lok Sabha; 2014–2021	President of parliamentary board of Janata Dal (United) incumbent
