= Jawahar Prasad =

Indian politician

Jawahar Prasad Kushwaha
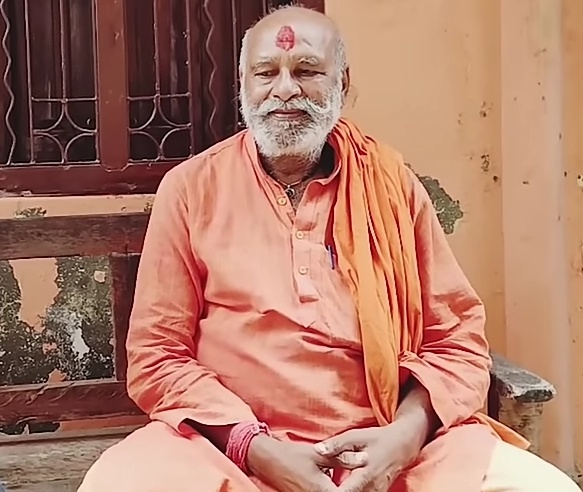

Member of the Legislative Assembly (India)
- In office 1990–1995
- Constituency: Sasaram Assembly constituency

Member of the Legislative Assembly (India)
- In office 1995–2000
- Succeeded by: Ashok Kushwaha
- Constituency: Sasaram Assembly constituency
- In office 2005–2010
- Constituency: Sasaram Assembly constituency
- In office 2010–2015
- Succeeded by: Ashok Kushwaha
- Constituency: Sasaram Assembly constituency

Personal details
- Born: Bihar, India
- Party: Bhartiya Janata Party

Jawahar Prasad Kushwaha is an Indian politician and a former Member of Bihar Legislative Assembly from Sasaram Assembly constituency. Prasad is a five term Member of Legislative Assembly from Sasaram; he was elected as a candidate of Bharatiya Janata Party. Prasad has also been associated with Rashtriya Swayamsevak Sangh in early part of his life. He became an active member of Sangh in 1989, and in 1990 election to Bihar Assembly, he was elected for the first time.

== Political career ==
In 1990 Bihar Assembly elections, Prasad defeated Bipin Bihari Sinha. He secured 42,956 votes in his favour compared to 24,261 votes in favour of Sinha.

== Arrest ==
Prasad was arrested in April 2023, by Bihar police on the charges of inciting the violence against Muslims in Sasaram during the Ram Navami procession. According to news reports, he was one of the leader, who was leading the procession in the Muslim dominated region. Latter, he allegedly provoked the masses for pelting stones, which resulted in communal strife. It was reported that, in this incident, many regions like Sahajlal Peer colony and Qadirganj of Sasaram witnessed communal tensions. The rioters burnt many houses of the local Muslim inhabitants and destroyed private as well as public property. In response to arrest of Prasad over allegations of inciting violence, Nikhil Anand, president of Other Backward Class wing of Bharatiya Janata Party denounced the claims of Bihar police and administration of Prasad being the culprit in Ram Navami violence.

Condemning the arrest of Prasad on allegations of spreading communal violence, Bhartiya Janata Party leader Sushil Kumar Modi alleged that Nitish Kumar's government arrested Prasad, as he was a popular leader from Koeri caste in Sasaram Assembly constituency and since the people belonging to his caste group have shifted their loyalty to Bhartiya Janata Party, administration of Kumar is targeting him on caste grounds.
