= Ashok Kushwaha =

Indian politician from Bihar

Ashok Kumar
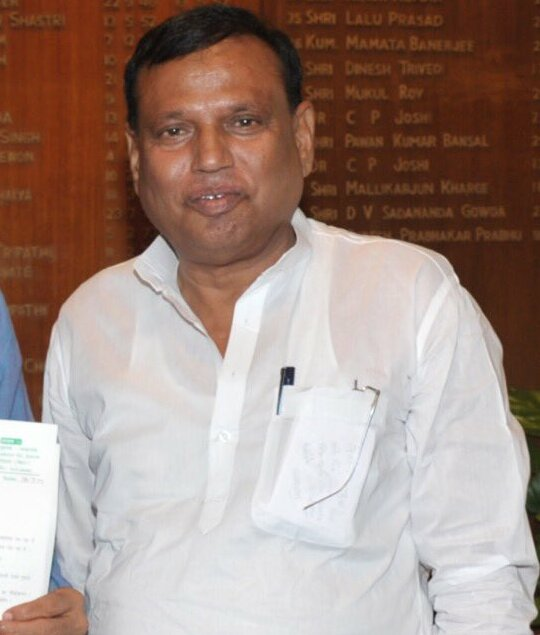
- Ashok Kumar

Member of the Bihar Legislative Assembly
- In office 2015–2020
- Constituency: Sasaram
- In office 2000–2005
- Constituency: Sasaram

Personal details
- Born: Sasaram, Bihar, India
- Party: Bahujan Samaj Party
- Other political affiliations: Rashtriya Janata Dal
- Parent: Lachhuman Mahato (father)

Ashok Kumar better known as Ashok Kushwaha is a former Member of the Bihar Legislative Assembly from the Sasaram Assembly constituency. He was a member of Rashtriya Janata Dal, and was elected in the 2000 Bihar assembly elections as well as the 2015 Bihar assembly elections. Kumar shifted his allegiance to Janata Dal (United) (JDU) prior to 2020 Bihar Legislative Assembly election and was made a candidate of JDU from Sasaram constituency against Rajesh Kumar Gupta of Rashtriya Janata Dal. However, he was defeated in the 2020 elections. In 2015 assembly elections, Kumar had defeated Jawahar Prasad of Bhartiya Janata Party.
