= Prakash Chandra =

Indian politician

Member of Bihar Legislative Assembly
- Incumbent
- Assumed office 14 November 2025
- Preceded by: Rishi Kumar
- Constituency: Obra

Personal details
- Party: Lok Janshakti Party (Ram Vilas)
- Education: Magadh University
- Profession: Politician, Businessman

Prakash Chandra is an Indian politician from Bihar. He was elected as a Member of Bihar Legislative Assembly in the 2025 Bihar Legislative Assembly election, representing the Obra constituency. He is a member of the Lok Janshakti Party (Ram Vilas).
