= Jai Kumar Singh =

Indian politician

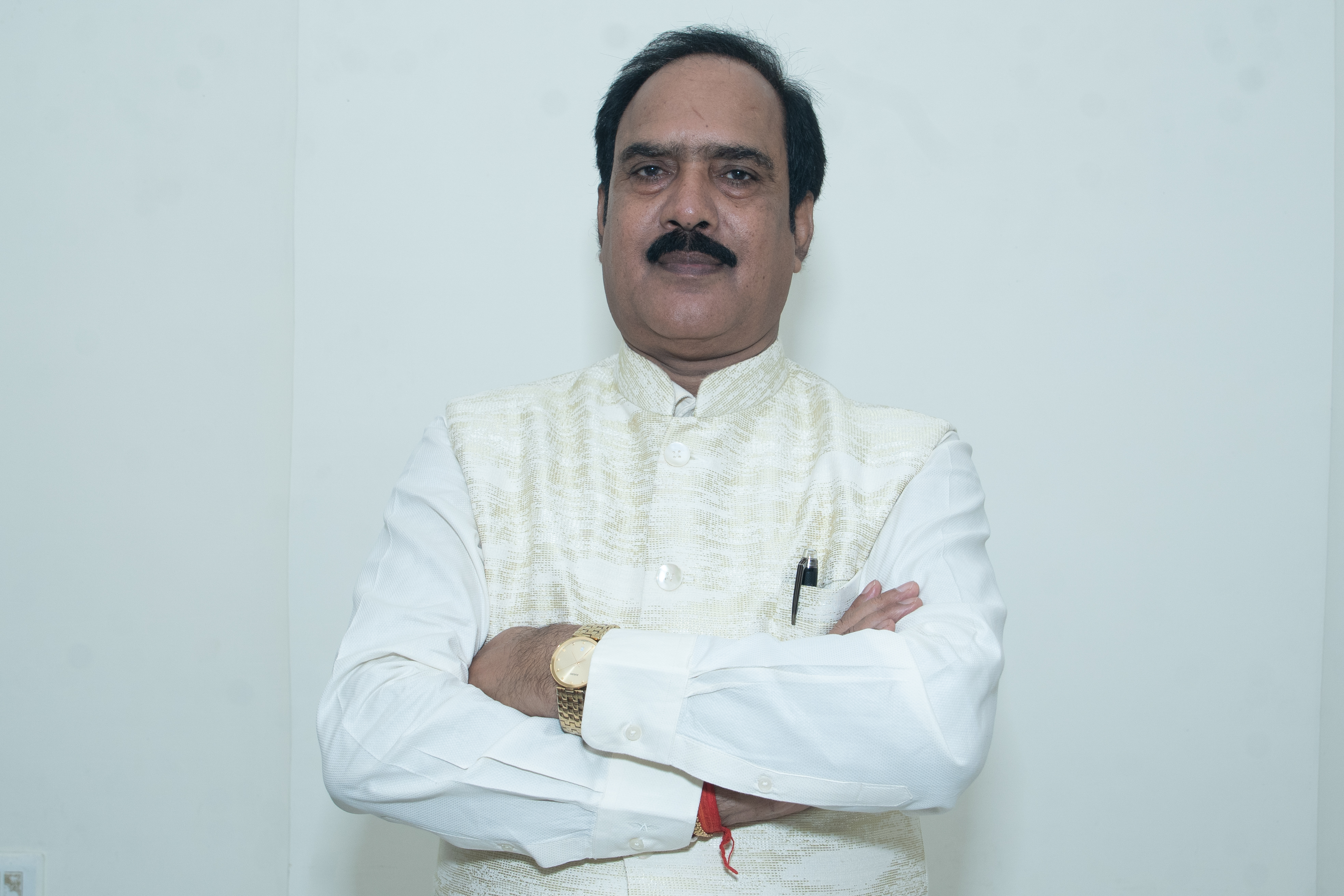

Member of Bihar Legislative Assembly
- In office November 2010 – November 2020
- Preceded by: Sita Sundari Devi
- Succeeded by: Vijay Mandal
- Constituency: Dinara

Minister of Science and Technology Government of Bihar
- In office 29 July 2017 – 09 August 2022
- Preceded by: Ashok Choudhary
- Succeeded by: Sumit Kumar Singh

Minister of Industries Government of Bihar
- In office 20 November 2015 – 2 June 2019
- Preceded by: Shyam Rajak
- Succeeded by: Shyam Rajak

Minister of Co-operative Government of Bihar
- In office 2014 – 2015
- Preceded by: Nitish Kumar
- Succeeded by: Alok Kumar Mehta

Personal details
- Born: 1 March 1963 (age 63) Parasdiha, Rohtas district, Bihar
- Party: Janata Dal (United)
- Spouse: Puja Singh
- Children: 2
- Education: Bachelor of Technology

Jai Kumar Singh is an Indian politician from the Rohtas district of Bihar, India. He served as Minister of Department of Science and Technology, Bihar and was a Member of Bihar Legislative Assembly representing Dinara vidhan sabha constituency since 2005.

== Political career ==
Singh made entry into politics in 2001 as a member of the Rohtas district council. In 2005 Bihar Legislative Assembly election, he won from Dinara Vidhan sabha constituency. Again in 2010 Bihar Legislative Assembly election and 2015 Bihar Legislative Assembly election, he won from the same constituency. He also held the position as the Minister of the Cooperative Department of Government of Bihar in 2014. Currently, he serves as the Minister of Department of Science and Technology, Bihar.

== See also ==
- List of science and technology ministers of Bihar
