= Rashtriya Lok Morcha =

- Abbreviation: RLM
- President: Upendra Kushwaha
- Secretary: Fazal Imam Mallick
- General Secretary: Madhav Anand
- Rajya Sabha Leader: Upendra Kushwaha
- Treasurer: Roshan Raja
- Founder: Upendra Kushwaha
- Founded: 20 February 2023 (3 years ago)
- Split from: Janata Dal (United)
- Preceded by: Rashtriya Lok Samata Party
- Headquarters: 24M Stand Road Patna pincode-800014
- Student wing: Chhatra Lok Morcha
- ECI Status: Registered unrecognized party
- Alliance: National Democratic Alliance (2023 – present)
- Seats in Rajya Sabha: 1 / 245
- Seats in Lok Sabha: 0 / 543
- Seats in Bihar Legislative Council: 1 / 75
- Seats in Bihar Legislative Assembly: 4 / 243

Election symbol
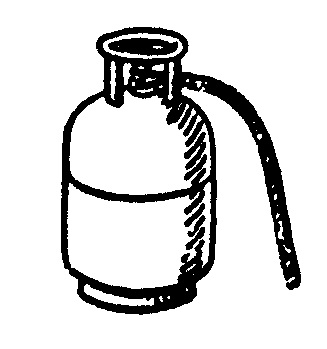
- Gas Cylinder

Party flag
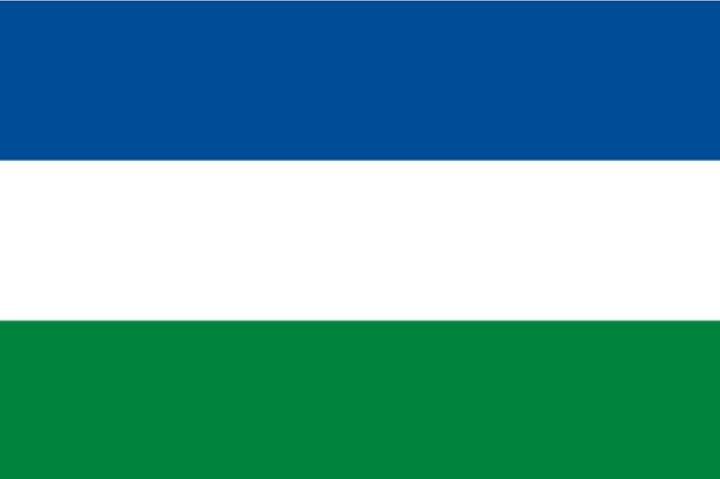

The Rashtriya Lok Morcha (abbr. RLM), originally established as Rashtriya Lok Janata Dal is an Indian political party formally announced by Upendra Kushwaha on 20 February 2023, in Bihar after resignation from Janata Dal (United). The party's ideology is based on the ideals of Karpoori Thakur. The foundation of the party was preceded by a two day conference organised by Upendra Kushwaha in Patna, in which he invoked the participation of all the members of Mahatama Phule Samata Parishad, a socio-political organisation and his trusted aides in Janata Dal (United). In the backdrop of this conference the foundation of the party was announced. Jitendra Nath who hails from Sheikhpura was made the party's vice president.

== History ==
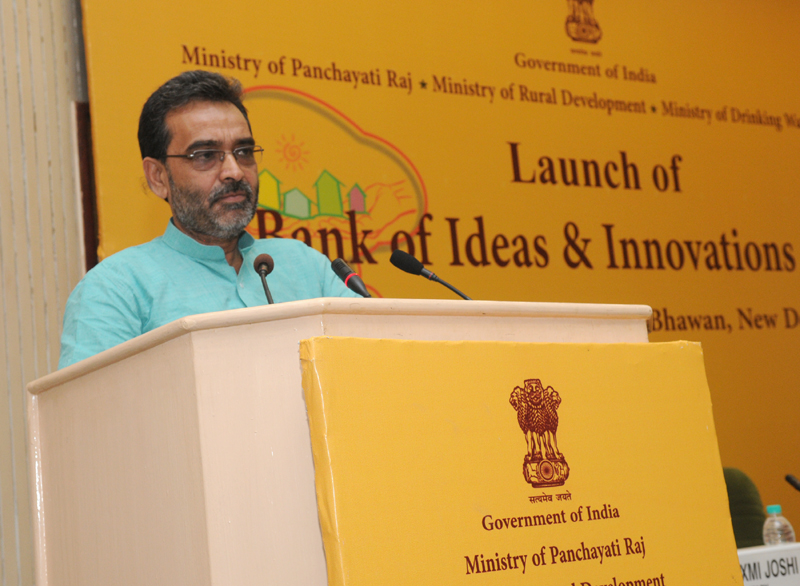
Upendra Kushwaha (then the president of Rashtriya Lok Samata Party) in 2014, as the Minister of State for Rural Development, Panchayati Raj, Drinking Water and Sanitation, addressing at the inauguration of the National Conference of ‘Bank of Ideas and Innovations’, in New Delhi.

In 2020 Bihar Legislative Assembly election, Upendra Kushwaha, then the president of Rashtriya Lok Samata Party (RLSP), formed a third front called Grand Democratic Secular Front, which included parties with minor presence in Bihar. The front included Bahujan Samaj Party and All India Majlis-e-Ittehadul Muslimeen. The coalition performed poorly in Bihar Assembly elections of 2020, winning only 6 seats. The Rashtriya Lok Samata Party failed to win any seat, but was responsible for defeat of Janata Dal (United) (JDU) in over dozens of constituencies. Due to shift of Kushwaha voters to RLSP, JDU became a junior partner in National Democratic Alliance, with its seats significantly reduced in Bihar Legislative Assembly in comparison to its partner Bhartiya Janata Party.

After the results were out, JDU reorganised itself by analysing the causes of its defeat and Upendra Kushwaha was invited to join the party once again. Kushwaha merged his Rashtriya Lok Samata Party into Janata Dal (United) and was made the President of Parliamentary Board of JDU. The JDU also nominated him to Bihar Legislative Council. Few months later, the rumours of Nitish Kumar selecting Tejashwi Yadav as his successor caused uneasiness for many members of JDU. Kushwaha now emerged as the critic of Tejashwi Yadav. He demanded his share in JDU and refused to accept the leadership of Yadav. Amidst verbal attacks by the spokespersons and leaders of JDU, he organised a two day conference in Patna, in which all the members of his defunct Rashtriya Lok Samata Party, who were in JDU were invited. The members of another organisation led by him called Mahatma Phule Samata Parishad were also invited in this conference. On 20 February 2023, in this two day conference, the Rashtriya Lok Janata Dal (later renamed as the Rashtriya Lok Morcha) was founded.

Kushwaha launched his Virasat Bachao Yatra, a statewide tour in Bihar after the foundation of Rashtriya Lok Morcha. The party was said to be formed in a bid to prohibit the Rashtriya Janata Dal leader Tejashwi Yadav from becoming the new face of Mahagathbandhan and the successor of Nitish Kumar as the Chief Minister of Bihar. The RLM also organised Samrat Ashok Jayanti (celebration of anniversary of Ashoka in Samrat Ashok International Convention Centre (Bapu Sabhagaar), Patna on 2 March 2023 in a bid to attract the Kushwaha (Koeri) caste to the party. Few days after it, the party announced the list of its office bearers. The list included some of the old allies of Upendra Kushwaha like Fazal Imam Mallick and Madhav Anand, who were associated with him from the time of Rashtriya Lok Samata Party. Some new entrants were also given significant position; Jitendra Nath, who is reported to have significant hold on Dhanuk and Kurmi caste in Magadh region was made National Vice President while former Member of Bihar Legislative Assembly from Ziradei Assembly constituency, Ramesh Singh Kushwaha was appointed as the Bihar state president of the party. Party's name changed on 18 February 2024 to Rashtriya Lok Morcha as Election Commission of India refused to assign it the name of Rashtriya Lok Janata Dal.

In 2025 Bihar Legislative Assembly election, the party contested from 6 seats as part of National Democratic Alliance and won from 4 of these. However, Deepak Prakash, the son of Upendra Kushwaha was made the minister for panchayati raj in Tenth Nitish Kumar ministry in place of any of the victorious candidates of party. This led to rebellion and resignation of some of the key members of party including state president Mahendra Kushwaha and vice president Jitendra Nath over accusations of 'dynastic politics'.

== Organisation ==
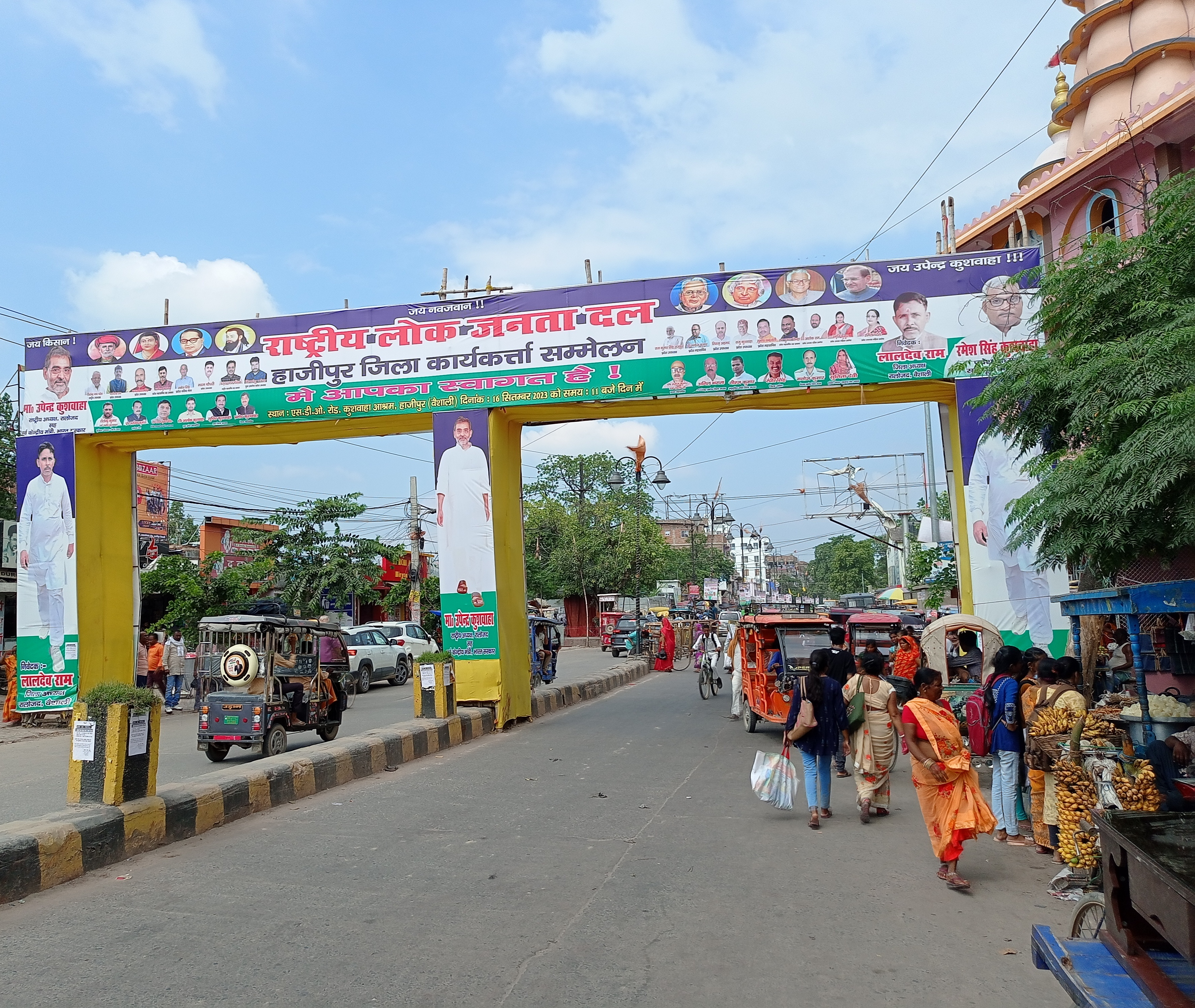
Route to Kushwaha Ashram, the headquarter of RLM in Hajipur, where official meetings are conducted involving party workers.

- Jitendra Nath, Vice President (Organization)
- Madhav Anand, Principal General Secretary
- Fazal Imam Mallick, General Secretary cum Spokesperson
- Narendra Kumar, National General Secretary cum spokesperson

=== Important members ===
- Madan Chowdhary, Vice President, and caretaker State president, bihar (Organization)
- Subhash Chandravanshi, General Secretary
- Brajendra Kumar Pappu, General Secretary cum spokesperson
- Rahul Kumar, General Secretary cum Spokesperson
- Rampukar Sinha, General Secretary cum Spokesperson
- Himanshu Patel, State President, Youth Cell
- Ashok Ram, State President, Scheduled Caste Cell
- Sonu Verma, State General Secretary [It Cell]
- Roshan Raja, State President (IT Cell)

== Electoral Performance ==
=== Lok Sabha (General) election results ===
Election	Lok sabha	Party leader	Seats contested	Seats won/Seats contested	+/- in seats	Overall vote %	Vote swing	Ref.
2024	18th	Upendra Kushwaha	1 (Under NDA)	0 / 1	Steady		New entry	

=== Bihar Assembly Elections ===
Election	Lok sabha	Party leader	Seats contested	Seats won/Seats contested	+/- in seats	Overall vote %	Vote swing	Ref.
2025	17th Assembly	Upendra Kushwaha	6	4 / 6	▲4	1.06	New entry	

== Performance of Candidates in 2025 Bihar Legislative Assembly Elections ==
AC No.	AC Name	Candidate name	Gender	Age	Total Votes	Vote %	Result
208	Sasaram	Snehlata Kushwaha	Female	56	105,006	47.49	Won
36	Madhubani	Madhav Anand	Male	43	97,956	46.38	Won
27	Bajpatti	Rameshwar Mahto	Male	50	99,144	45.02	Won
210	Dinara	Alok Kumar Singh	Male	49	78,338	41.88	Won
134	Ujiarpur	Prashant Kumar Pankaj	Male	50	86,424	37.58	Lost
97	Paroo	Madan Chaudhary	Male	57	66,445	29.12	Lost
