= Rishi Kumar =

Indian politician

MLA, Bihar Legislative Assembly
- In office 2020–2025
- Preceded by: Birendra Yadav
- Succeeded by: Prakash Chandra
- Constituency: Obra

Personal details
- Born: Kargahar,Rohtas district, Bihar
- Party: Rashtriya Janata Dal
- Relations: Vijay Yadav (Uncle)
- Parent(s): Kanti Singh (Mother); Late Keshav Prasad Singh (Father)
- Education: M.B.A from Amity University, Noida, Uttar Pradesh
- Occupation: Politician social work

Rishi Kumar is an Indian politician who was elected as a member of Bihar Legislative Assembly from Obra constituency in 2020 as candidate of Rashtriya Janata Dal. His mother Kanti Singh served as Union Minister of State, Ministry of Human Resource Development and Union Minister of State, Ministry of Heavy Industries in Government of India.

== See also ==
- Obra, Bihar Assembly constituency
- Kanti Singh
- Vijay Mandal
