= Ram Vilas Singh =

Indian politician

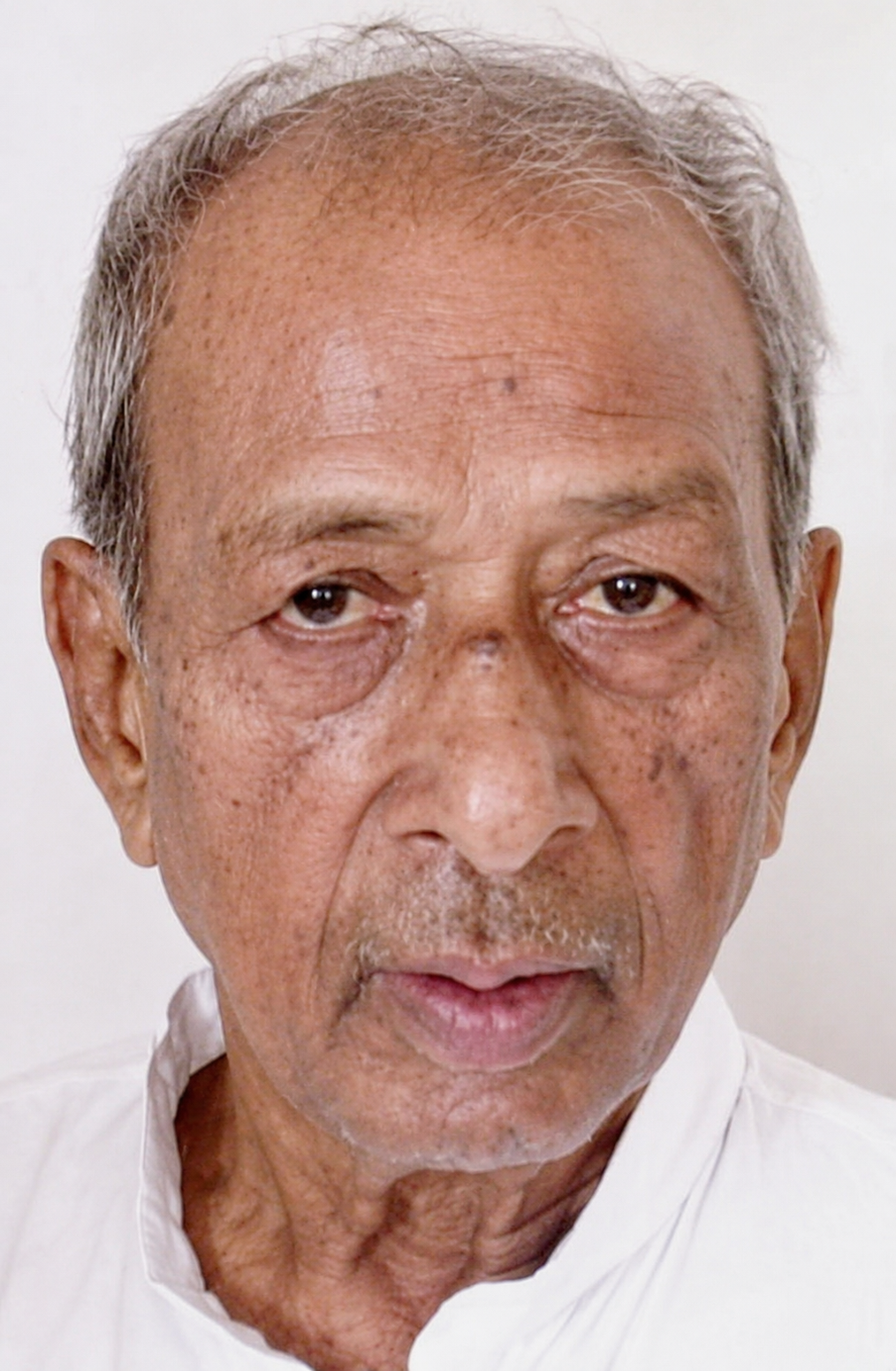

MLA, Bihar legislative Assembly EX- Minister in bihar government
- In office 1977–1980
- Preceded by: Narain Singh
- Succeeded by: Virendra Prasad Singh
- Constituency: Obra
- In office 1985–1990
- Preceded by: Virendra Prasad Singh
- Succeeded by: Self
- Constituency: Obra
- In office 1990–1995
- Preceded by: Self
- Succeeded by: Raja Ram Singh
- Constituency: Obra

Personal details
- Born: Daudnagar, Aurangabad, Bengal Presidency (Now in Bihar)
- Died: Daudnagar, Aurangabad, Bihar
- Party: Janata Dal; Janata Party; Lokdal; Samyukta Socialist Party; Socialist Party
- Occupation: Politician

Ram Vilas Singh also known as Ram Vilas Singh Yadav was an Indian politician. He was elected as a member of Bihar Legislative Assembly from Obra constituency in Aurangabad, Bihar.

== Political life ==
Ramvilas Singh yadav was also an elected twice from Daudnagar Assembly constituency in 1969 and 1972 as a member of SSP and (SOP), Samyukta Socialist Party/Socialist Party, and thrice from Obra constituency.

== Memories ==
Aurangabad bus stand was renamed by district board of Aurangabad, known as Ram Vilas Singh Yadav bus stand Aurangabad, Bihar.

== See also ==
- Ram Vilas Singh High School
- Obra, Bihar Assembly constituency
- Aurangabad district, Bihar
