= Vijay Mandal =

Indian politician

Vijay Kumar Mandal

MLA, Bihar Legislative Assembly
- In office 2020–2025
- Preceded by: Jai Kumar Singh
- Succeeded by: Alok Kumar Singh
- Constituency: Dinara

Personal details
- Born: 1 January 1957 (age 69) Kargahar,Rohtas district, Bihar, India
- Party: Rashtriya Janata Dal
- Relations: Kanti Singh (sister in law); Rishis Yadav (nephew)
- Parent: Sarda Singh (father)
- Education: Graduate of Veer Kunwar Singh University
- Occupation: Politician social work

Vijay Kumar Mandal (born 1 January 1957) is an Indian politician from Bihar. He is a former member of Bihar Legislative Assembly from Dinara Assembly constituency in Rohtas district representing the Rashtriya Janata Dal.

== Early life ==
Mandal is from Kargahar, Rohtas district, Bihar. He is the son of Sarda Singh. He graduated from a college which is affiliated with Veer Kunwar Singh University, Arrah, Bihar. He declared assets worth Rs.2 crore in 2020 in his affidavit to the Election Commission of India.

== Career ==
Mandal won the Dinara Assembly constituency in the 2020 Bihar Legislative Assembly election representing the Rashtriya Janata Dal. He polled 59,541 votes and defeated his nearest rival, Rajendra Singh of the Lok Janshakti Party, by 8,228 votes.

== See also ==
- Dinara Assembly constituency
- Kanti Singh
- Rishi Singh Yadav
