= Birendra Yadav =

Indian politician

Birendra Kumar Sinha

Member of Bihar Legislative Assembly
- In office 2015–2020
- Preceded by: Somprakash Singh Yadav
- Succeeded by: Rishi Kumar
- Constituency: Obra

Personal details
- Born: 15 August 1968 (age 58) Village bhagwan Bigha, Post Pilchhi, P.s. Daudangar, Dist-Aurangabad, Bihar
- Party: Rashtriya Janata Dal
- Education: Bachelor of Arts, Magadh University
- Profession: Politician, social worker

Birendra Kumar Yadav is an Indian politician. He was elected to the Bihar Legislative Assembly from Obra as a Member of Bihar Legislative Assembly and a member of the Rashtriya Janata Dal in 2015.
