= Obra, Bihar Assembly constituency =

Coordinates: 24.89°N 84.37°E

Obra
- Constituency No. 220 for the Bihar Legislative Assembly

Constituency details
- Country: India
- Region: East India
- State: Bihar
- Division: Magadh division
- District: Aurangabad
- Established: 1951
- Total electors: 319,915

Member of Legislative Assembly
- 18th Bihar Legislative Assembly
- Incumbent Prakash Chandra
- Party: LJP(RV)
- Alliance: NDA
- Elected year: 2025

Obra Assembly constituency is an assembly constituency in Aurangabad district in the Indian state of Bihar. It comes under Karakat Lok Sabha constituency. Obra Vidhan Sabha consists of two blocks of Aurangabad district viz. Daudnagar and Obra.

As per the estimates of the 2011 census, out of a total 432861 population, 84.49% is rural and 15.51% is urban population. The Scheduled castes (SC) and Scheduled tribes (ST) ratio is 22.05 and 0.04, respectively out of total population. As per the voter list of 2019, there are 305747 electorates and 336 polling stations in this constituency. Voter turnout was 48.8% in 2019 Lok Sabha elections and 55.06% in 2020 Bihar assembly election.

== Members of the Legislative Assembly ==
Year	Name	Party
1952	Padarath Singh	Socialist Party
1962	Dilkeshwar Ram	Indian National Congress
1967	Raghuvansh Kumar Singh	Indian National Congress
1969	Padarath Singh	Praja Socialist Party
1972	Narain Singh	Indian National Congress
1977	Ram Vilas Singh	Janata Party
1980	Virendra Prasad Singh	Bharatiya Janata Party
1985	Ram Vilas Singh	Lokdal
1990	Ram Vilas Singh	Janata Dal
1995	Raja Ram Singh Kushwaha	Communist Party of India (Marxist–Leninist) Liberation
2000	Raja Ram Singh Kushwaha	Communist Party of India (Marxist–Leninist) Liberation
2005	Satayanarayan Yadav	Rashtriya Janata Dal
2005	Satayanarayan Yadav	Rashtriya Janata Dal
2010	Somprakash Singh	Independent
2015	Birendra Yadav	Rashtriya Janata Dal
2020	Rishi Kumar	Rashtriya Janata Dal
2025	Prakash Chandra	Lok Janshakti Party (Ram Vilas)

== Assembly Elections 2020 ==
Bihar Assembly election, 2020: Obra
Party	Candidate	Votes	%	±%
RJD	Rishi Yadav	63,662	36.24	
LJP	Prakash Chandra	40,994	23.34	
JD(U)	Sunil Kumar	25,234	14.36	
RLSP	Ajay Kumar	19,879	11.32	
Independent	Pramod Singh Chandravanshi	7,736	4.4	
JAP(L)	Sujeet Kumar	4,066	2.31	
NOTA	None of the above	3,793	2.16	
Majority		22,668	12.9	
Turnout		175,665	55.06	
RJD hold		Swing		

== Results ==
=== 2025 ===
2025 Bihar Legislative Assembly election: Obra
Party	Candidate	Votes	%	±%
LJP(RV)	Prakash Chandra	91,638	44.83	
RJD	Rishi Kumar	79,625	38.95	+2.71
BSP	Sanjay Kumar	7,896	3.86	
Independent	Md Taufique Alam	4,566	2.23	
SBSP	Uday Narayan Rajbhar	3,968	1.94	
JSP	Sudhir Kumar Sharma	3,779	1.85	
Independent	Ram Raj Yadav	2,820	1.38	
NOTA	None of the above	919	0.45	−1.71
Majority		12,013	5.88	−7.02
Turnout		204,422	63.9	+8.68
LJP(RV) gain from RJD		Swing		

=== 2020 ===
2020 Bihar Legislative Assembly election: Obra
Party	Candidate	Votes	%	±%
RJD	Rishi Kumar	63,662	36.24	+1.38
LJP	Prakash Chandra	40,994	23.34	
JD(U)	Sunil Kumar	25,234	14.36	
RLSP	Ajay Kumar	19,879	11.32	−16.45
Independent	Pramod Singh Chandravanshi	7,736	4.4	
Swaraj Party (Loktantrik)	Som Prakash	7,035	4.0	−2.29
JAP(L)	Sujeet Kumar	4,066	2.31	
NOTA	None of the above	3,793	2.16	+0.42
Majority		22,668	12.9	+5.81
Turnout		175,665	55.22	+0.1
RJD hold		Swing		

=== 2015 ===
2015 Bihar Legislative Assembly election: Obra
Party	Candidate	Votes	%	±%
RJD	Birendra Kumar Sinha	56,042	34.86	
RLSP	Chandra Bhushan Verma	44,646	27.77	
CPI(ML)L	Raja Ram Singh	22,801	14.18	
Swaraj Party (Loktantrik)	Som Prakash	10,114	6.29	
BSP	Ram Autar Chaudhari	6,561	4.08	
NCP	Abhimanyu Sharma	3,720	2.31	
Independent	Richa Singh	1,868	1.16	
Independent	Brinda Singh	1,828	1.14	
SP	Neelam Kumari	1,798	1.12	
Akhil Hind Forward Bloc (Krantikari)	Shailesh Kumar Chandravanshi	1,691	1.05	
Independent	Akhilesh Sharma	1,487	0.93	
NOTA	None of the above	2,795	1.74	
Majority		11,396	7.09	
Turnout		160,747	55.12	
