= Rajesh Kumar Gupta =

Indian politician (born 1975)

Rajesh Kumar Gupta (born 15 January 1975) is an Indian politician from Bihar. He was an MLA from Sasaram Assembly constituency in Rohtas district. He won the 2020 Bihar Legislative Assembly election representing Rashtriya Janata Dal.

== Early life and education ==
Gupta is from Sasaram, Rohtas district, Bihar. He is the son of Baijnath Gupta. He completed his graduation in 1995 at Shri Shankar College, Sasaram, which is affiliated with Magadh University, Bodhgaya. He is a contractor and his wife runs a beauty parlour.

== Career ==
Gupta won from Sasaram Assembly constituency representing Rashtriya Janata Dal in the 2020 Bihar Legislative Assembly election. He polled 83,303 votes and defeated his nearest rival, Ashok Kumar of Janata Dal (United), by a margin of 26,423 votes.
