= Dinara Assembly constituency =

Assembly constituency in Bihar, India

Coordinates: 25.25°N 84.06°E

- Constituency No. - for the Bihar Legislative Assembly

Constituency details
- Country: India
- Region: East India
- State: Bihar
- District: Rohtas
- Lok Sabha constituency: Buxar
- Established: 1951
- Total electors: 308,070

Member of Legislative Assembly
- 18th Bihar Legislative Assembly
- Incumbent Alok Kumar Singh
- Party: RLM
- Alliance: NDA
- Elected year: 2025

Dinara Assembly constituency is an assembly constituency for Bihar Legislative Assembly in Rohtas district. It comes under Buxar (Lok Sabha constituency).

== Members of the Legislative Assembly ==
Year	Name	Party
1952	Ramanand Upadhya	Indian National Congress
1957	Ramashish Singh	Praja Socialist Party
1962	Ramashish Singh	Praja Socialist Party
1967	Ramashish Singh	Samyukta Socialist Party
1969	Ramanand Prasad Singh	Indian National Congress
1972	Ram Narain Sah	Indian National Congress
1977	Sheopujan Singh	Janata Party
1980	Lakshman Rai	Indian National Congress
1985	Lakshman Rai	Indian National Congress
1990	Ramdhani Singh	Janata Dal
1995	Ramdhani Singh	Janata Dal
2000	Ramdhani Singh	Janata Dal (United)
2005	Ramdhani Singh	Janata Dal (United)
2005	Sita Sundari Devi	Bahujan Samaj Party
2010	Jai Kumar Singh	Janata Dal (United)
2015	Jai Kumar Singh	Janata Dal (United)
2020	Vijay Mandal	Rashtriya Janata Dal
2025	Alok Kumar Singh	Rashtriya Lok Morcha

== Election results ==
=== 2025 ===
2025 Bihar Legislative Assembly election: Dinara
Party	Candidate	Votes	%	±%
RLM	Alok Kumar Singh	78,338	41.88	
RJD	Shashi Shankar Kumar	67,504	36.09	▲1.12
Independent	Jai Kumar Singh	17,839	9.54	
BSP	Malati Devi	8,382	4.48	
JSP	Sanjay Kumar	6,406	3.42	
NOTA	None of the above	1,631	0.87	▼0.03
Majority		10,834	5.79	▲0.95
Turnout		187,064	60.72	▲4.26
RLM gain from RJD		Swing		

=== 2020 ===
Bihar Legislative Assembly Election, 2020: Dinara
Party	Candidate	Votes	%	±%
RJD	Vijay Mandal	59,541	34.97	
LJP	Rajendra Singh	51,313	30.13	
JD(U)	Jai Kumar Singh	27,252	16.0	−26.98
RLSP	Rajesh Singh	18,368	10.79	
Independent	Rajesh Kumar Ram	1,681	0.99	
Independent	Niranjan Kumar Ray	1,567	0.92	
NOTA	None of the above	1,527	0.9	+0.37
Majority		8,228	4.84	+3.05
Turnout		170,280	56.46	+1.26
RJD gain from JD(U)		Swing		

=== 2015 ===
2015 Bihar Legislative Assembly election: Dinara
Party	Candidate	Votes	%	±%
JD(U)	Jai Kumar Singh	64,699	42.98	
BJP	Rajendra Prasad Singh	62,008	41.19	
SS	Binod Kumar Choubey	4,265	2.83	
Independent	Sunil Kumar Paswan	3,774	2.51	
CPI(ML)L	Achche Lal Ram	2,769	1.84	
Independent	Sheikh Hamhataq Alam	2,757	1.83	
Independent	Manoj Kumar Singh	2,234	1.48	
BSP	Jawahar Singh Yadav	1,874	1.24	
CPI	Raghunath Singh	1,468	0.98	
NOTA	None of the above	798	0.53	
Majority		2,691	1.79	
Turnout		150,539	55.2	
