= Sasaram Assembly constituency =

- Constituency No. 208 for the Bihar Legislative Assembly

Constituency details
- Country: India
- Region: East India
- State: Bihar
- District: Rohtas
- Lok Sabha constituency: Sasaram
- Established: 1957
- Total electors: 355,249

Member of Legislative Assembly
- 18th Bihar Legislative Assembly
- Incumbent Snehlata Kushwaha
- Party: RLM
- Alliance: NDA
- Elected year: 2025

Sasaram Assembly constituency is one of 243 legislative assembly of legislative assembly of Bihar. It comes under Sasaram Lok Sabha constituency.

== Overview ==
Sasaram comprises community blocks of Sasaram & Tilouthu. Earlier Rohtas block and Nauhatta block also came under the Sasaram assembly constituency but after the delimitation of 2009 these two blocks began comprising Chenari Vidhansabha.

== Social equation ==
Sasaram constituency is dominated by Kushwahas, as a result of which, from 1980 to 2015, in all the assembly elections, only candidates belonging to this caste have been elected from this constituency. The victory of Ram Sewak Singh in the 1980 Bihar Legislative Assembly election was followed by victory of only Kushwaha candidates from this seat and from the 1990 onwards, the first as well as second runner-ups were also from the same caste. As a result of this, all the political parties started fielding only those candidates, who belonged to this caste group.

== Members of the Legislative Assembly ==
Year	Member	Party
1957	Bipin Behari Sinha	Praja Socialist Party
1957	Ramadhar Dusadh	Praja Socialist Party
1962	Dukhan Ram	Indian National Congress
1967	Vinod Bihari Singh	Indian National Congress
1969	Bipin Behari Sinha	Praja Socialist Party
1972	Ram Sewak Singh	Kisan Mazdoor Praja Party
1977	Bipin Behari Sinha	Janata Party
1980	Ram Sewak Singh	Janata Party
1985	Ram Sewak Singh	Lok Dal
1990	Jawahar Prasad	Bharatiya Janata Party
1995	Jawahar Prasad	Bharatiya Janata Party
2000	Ashok Kushwaha	Rashtriya Janata Dal
2005	Jawahar Prasad	Bharatiya Janata Party
2005	Jawahar Prasad	Bharatiya Janata Party
2010	Jawahar Prasad	Bharatiya Janata Party
2015	Ashok Kushwaha	Rashtriya Janata Dal
2020	Rajesh Gupta	Rashtriya Janata Dal
2025	Snehlata Kushwaha	Rashtriya Lok Morcha

== Election results ==
=== 2025 ===
2025 Bihar Legislative Assembly election: Sasaram
Party	Candidate	Votes	%	±%
RLM	Snehlata Kushwaha	105,006	47.49	
RJD	Satendra Sah	79,563	35.99	−10.55
BSP	Ashok Kushwaha	10,261	4.64	
JSP	Binay Kumar Singh	6,495	2.94	
ASP(KR)	Md Shahzad Hussain	3,517	1.59	
SBSP	Rekha Devi	2,918	1.32	
Independent	Vivek Kumar	2,788	1.26	
NOTA	None of the above	961	0.43	−0.18
Majority		25,443	11.5	−3.26
Turnout		221,091	62.24	+11.11
RLM gain from RJD		Swing		

=== 2020 ===
2020 Bihar Legislative Assembly election: Sasaram
Party	Candidate	Votes	%	±%
RJD	Rajesh Kumar Gupta	83,303	46.54	▼1.02
JD(U)	Ashok Kushwaha	56,880	31.78	
LJP	Rameshwar Chaurasiya	21,426	11.97	
Independent	Muneshwar Gupta	2,463	1.38	
Independent	Deen Dayal Singh	2,178	1.22	▲0.79
Independent	Satyanand Kumar	1,691	0.94	▲0.11
NOTA	None of the above	1,093	0.61	▼1.26
Majority		26,423	14.76	▲3.49
Turnout		178,993	51.13	▼2.08
RJD hold		Swing		

=== 2015 ===
2015 Bihar Legislative Assembly election: Sasaram
Party	Candidate	Votes	%	±%
RJD	Ashok Kumar Kushwaha	82,766	47.56	
BJP	Jawahar Prasad	63,154	36.29	
Independent	Krishna Kumar Singh	9,247	5.31	
BSP	Dineshwar Singh	3,793	2.18	
SP	Satendra Sah	2,646	1.52	
NOTA	None of the above	3,248	1.87	
Majority		19,612	11.27	
Turnout		174,030	53.21	

== See also ==
- List of constituencies of Bihar Legislative Assembly
