= Nabinagar Assembly constituency =

Assembly constituency in Bihar, India

Coordinates: 24.61°N 84.13°E

- Constituency No. 221 for the Bihar Legislative Assembly

Constituency details
- Country: India
- Region: East India
- State: Bihar
- District: Aurangabad
- Lok Sabha constituency: Karakat (Lok Sabha constituency)
- Established: 1951
- Total electors: 283,912

Member of Legislative Assembly
- 18th Bihar Legislative Assembly
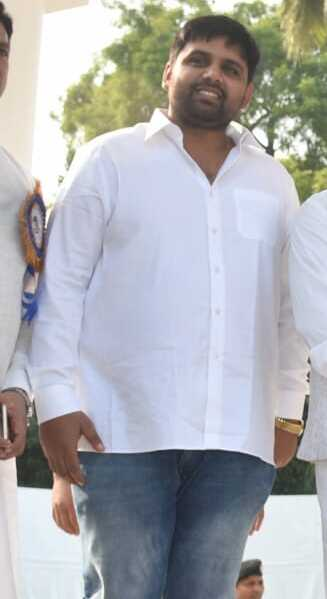
- Incumbent Chetan Anand; S/O: Anand Mohan Singh & Lovely Anand
- Party: JD(U)
- Alliance: NDA
- Elected year: 2025
- Preceded by: Vijay Singh, RJD

Nabinagar Assembly constituency is an assembly constituency for Bihar Legislative Assembly in Aurangabad district, Bihar. It comes under Karakat (Lok Sabha constituency).

== Members of the Legislative Assembly ==
Year	Name	Party
1952	Anugrah Narayan Sinha	Indian National Congress
1957	Deodhari Ram	Indian National Congress
1962	Satyendra Narayan Sinha	Indian National Congress
1967	Satyendra Narayan Sinha	Indian National Congress
1969	Mahabir Prasad Akela	Communist Party of India
1972	Yugal Singh	Indian National Congress
1977	Yugal Singh	Janata Party
1980	Raghuvansh Prasad Singh	Indian National Congress
1985	Raghuvansh Prasad Singh	Indian National Congress
1990	Raghuvansh Prasad Singh	Indian National Congress
1995	Virendra Kumar Singh	Janata Dal
1996^	Lovely Anand	Bihar People's Party
2000	Bheem Kumar Yadav	Rashtriya Janata Dal
2005	Bheem Kumar Yadav	Rashtriya Janata Dal
2005	Vijay Kumar Singh	Lok Janshakti Party
2010	Virendra Kumar Singh	Janata Dal (United)
2015	Virendra Kumar Singh	Janata Dal (United)
2020	Vijay Kumar Singh	Rashtriya Janata Dal
2025	Chetan Anand	Janata Dal

^denotes by-election

== Election results ==

2025 Bihar Legislative Assembly election: Nabinagar
Party	Candidate	Votes	%	±%
JD(U)	Chetan Anand	80,380	42.29	+1.61
RJD	Amod Kumar Singh	80,268	42.23	+1.55
Independent	Lav Kumar Singh	7,075	3.72	New
BSP	Vinod Kumar	6,595	3.47	New
JSP	Archana Chandra	4,085	2.15	New
NOTA	NOTA	4,042	2.13	+0.02
Independent	Mrityunjay Kr	3,670	1.93	New
SBSP	Dharmendra Rajwar	2,326	1.22	New
SUCI (C)	Anil Ram	906	0.48	New
SP (L)	Ajay Bhuiyan	709	0.37	New
Majority		112	0.06	−12.55
Turnout		190,056	68.68	+10.82
JD(U) gain from RJD		Swing	{{{swing}}}	

=== 2025 ===
2025 Bihar Legislative Assembly election: Nabinagar
Party	Candidate	Votes	%	±%
JD(U)	Chetan Anand	80,380	42.29	+14.22
RJD	Amod Kumar Singh	80,268	42.23	+1.55
Independent	Lav Kumar Singh	7,075	3.72	
BSP	Vinod Kumar	6,595	3.47	
JSP	Archana Chandra	4,085	2.15	
Independent	Mritunjay Kumar	3,670	1.93	
SBSP	Dharmendra Rajwar	2,336	1.23	
NOTA	None of the above	4,042	2.13	+0.02
Majority		112	0.06	−12.55
Turnout		190,066	66.95	+9.09
JD(U) gain from RJD		Swing		

=== 2020 ===
2020 Bihar Legislative Assembly election: Nabinagar
Party	Candidate	Votes	%	±%
RJD	Vijay Kumar Singh (Bihar)	64,943	40.68	
JD(U)	Virendra Kumar Singh	44,822	28.07	−2.99
RLSP	Dharmendra Kumar	23,490	14.71	
LJP	Vijay Kumar Singh	9,140	5.72	
Independent	Devpujan Prasad	2,994	1.88	
JAP(L)	Baban Kumar	1,977	1.24	
Independent	Anuj Kumar Singh	1,756	1.1	
Independent	Ranjan Kumar	1,665	1.04	
Independent	Sanju Devi	1,589	1.0	
NOTA	None of the above	3,368	2.11	+0.85
Majority		20,121	12.61	+8.73
Turnout		159,657	57.86	+4.32
RJD gain from JD(U)		Swing		

=== 2015 ===
2015 Bihar Legislative Assembly election: Nabinagar
Party	Candidate	Votes	%	±%
JD(U)	Virendra Kumar Singh	42,035	31.06	
BJP	Gopal Narayan Singh	36,774	27.18	
Independent	Vijay Kumar Singh	22,053	16.3	
BSP	Manju Devi	17,106	12.64	
Independent	Hari Shankar Tiwari	3,205	2.37	
CPI	Ram Ashis Ram	2,659	1.97	
Rashtra Sewa Dal	Dhanjay Kumar Singh	1,628	1.2	
Independent	Surendra Pasawan	1,535	1.13	
Independent	Lalmohan Choudhary	1,385	1.02	
NOTA	None of the above	1,710	1.26	
Majority		5,261	3.88	
Turnout		135,315	53.54	
