= G. Krishnaiah =

Indian civil servant (1957–1994)

Personal details
- Born: 8 February 1957 then Andhra Pradesh, India
- Died: 5 December 1994 (aged 37) Muzaffarpur, Bihar
- Spouse: Uma Devi
- Children: 2
- Occupation: Bureaucrat

G. Krishnaiah (8 February 1957 – 5 December 1994) was an Indian Administrative Service (IAS) officer of the 1985 batch who was killed in Muzaffarpur, Bihar by the mob led by a few politicians. At the time of death in 1994, he was 37 years old and serving as the District Magistrate (DM) of Gopalganj district, the home district of the then CM Lalu Prasad Yadav.

In memory of his death and service, a statue of him with a pen in pocket has been erected in Gopalganj.

== Early life ==
G. Krishnaiah was born in 1957 into a landless Dalit family in Mahbubnagar, Andhra Pradesh (present day in Telangana). His father worked as a coolie and Krishnaiah himself started off doing the same. He studied journalism, and later worked as a clerk before eventually joining the civil services.

== Death and aftermath ==
In 2007 Patna District Court convicted six politicians for his killing. The politicians convicted include Anand Mohan Singh and his wife Lovely Anand (both ex-MPs), Vijay Kumar Shukla known as "Munna Shukla" (MLA), Akhlaq Ahmed and Arun Kumar (both ex-MLAs), Harendra Kumar (senior JDU leader) and SS Thakur. In April 2023, the Bihar government tweaked the prison manual, removing the rule that prevented early release for those convicted of killing public servants on duty. This change allowed the government to grant remission (basically, reducing the sentence) to 27 prisoners, including Anand Mohan Singh. The amendment sparked widespread controversy and criticism across India. The Bahujan Samaj Party (BSP) described the rule change as "pro-crime" and "anti-Dalit", while the Bharatiya Janata Party (BJP) accused Bihar Chief Minister Nitish Kumar of altering the prison manual to benefit Singh, a prominent Rajput leader. Additionally, legal experts and civil society members expressed concerns over the potential implications of such amendments on the justice system.
