= Mahishi Assembly constituency =

Coordinates: 25°50′55″N 86°28′32″E

Mahishi
- Constituency No. 77 for the Bihar Legislative Assembly

Constituency details
- Country: India
- Region: East India
- State: Bihar
- District: Saharsa
- Lok Sabha constituency: Madhepura
- Established: 1967
- Total electors: 288,096
- Reservation: None

Member of Legislative Assembly
- 18th Bihar Legislative Assembly
- Incumbent Gautam Krishna
- Party: RJD
- Alliance: MGB
- Elected year: 2025
- Preceded by: Gunjeshwar Sah, JD(U)

Mahishi Assembly constituency is an assembly constituency in Saharsa district in the Indian state of Bihar.

== Overview ==
As per Delimitation of Parliamentary and Assembly constituencies Order, 2008, No. 77 Mahishi Assembly constituency is composed of the following: Nauhatta and Sattar Katiya community development blocks; Baghwa, Birgaun, Manwar, Telwa West, Telwa East, Bhalahi, Kundah, Mahisarho, Telhar, Pastpar and Arapatti gram panchayats of Mahishi CD Block.

Mahishi Assembly constituency is part of No. 13 Madhepura (Lok Sabha constituency).

== Members of the Legislative Assembly ==
Year	Name	Party
1967	Parameshwar Kumar	Samyukta Socialist Party
1969	Lahtan Chadhary	Indian National Congress
1972	Lahtan Chadhary	Indian National Congress
1977	Parameshwar Kumar	Janata Party
1980	Lahtan Chadhary	Indian National Congress
1985	Lahtan Chadhary	Indian National Congress
1990	Anand Mohan Singh	Janata Dal
1995	Abdul Ghafoor	Janata Dal
2000	Abdul Ghafoor	Rashtriya Janata Dal
2005	Surendra Yadav	Independent politician
2005	Gunjeshwar Sah	Janata Dal (United)
2010	Abdul Ghafoor	Rashtriya Janata Dal
2015	Abdul Ghafoor	Rashtriya Janata Dal
2020	Gunjeshwar Sah	Janata Dal (United)
2025	Gautam Krishna	Rashtriya Janata Dal

== Election results ==
=== 2025 ===
2025 Bihar Legislative Assembly election: Mahishi
Party	Candidate	Votes	%	±%
RJD	Gautam Krishna	93,752	46.19	+9.29
JD(U)	Gunjeshwar Sah	90,012	44.35	+6.52
Independent	Suraj Samrat	3,142	1.55	
JSP	Shamim Akhtar	2,571	1.27	
NOTA	None of the above	6,671	3.29	+1.57
Majority		3,740	1.84	+0.91
Turnout		202,966	70.45	+11.69
RJD gain from JD(U)		Swing	3,740	

=== 2020 ===
2020 Bihar Legislative Assembly election: Mahishi
Party	Candidate	Votes	%	±%
JD(U)	Gunjeshwar Sah	66,316	37.83	
RJD	Gautam Krishna	64,686	36.9	−1.87
LJP	Abdur Razzaque	22,110	12.61	
Independent	Yogendar Mukhiya	4,743	2.71	
Independent	Rama Shankar Singh	4,338	2.47	
RLSP	Shivendra Kumar	3,731	2.13	−18.68
NOTA	None of the above	3,008	1.72	−4.26
Majority		1,630	0.93	−17.03
Turnout		175,307	58.76	+5.31
JD(U) gain from RJD		Swing		

=== 2015 ===
2015 Bihar Legislative Assembly election: Mahishi
Party	Candidate	Votes	%	±%
RJD	Dr. Abdul Ghafoor	56,436	38.77	
RLSP	Chandan Kumar Sah	30,301	20.81	
JAP(L)	Gautam Krishna	19,958	13.71	
Independent	Punam Deo	11,361	7.8	
Independent	Surendra Yadav	6,281	4.31	
Independent	Bimal Kant Jha	2,409	1.65	
Independent	Rajkishor Sada	1,835	1.26	
BSP	Nanhe Khan	1,777	1.22	
Independent	Subodh Panday	1,702	1.17	
NOTA	None of the above	8,702	5.98	
Majority		26,135	17.96	
Turnout		145,580	53.45	

=== 2010 ===
In the 2016 state assembly election, Dr. Abdul Ghafoor of RJD won the Mahishi assembly seat defeating his nearest rival Chandan Kumar Sah of RLSP. In 2010 state assembly elections, Dr. Abdul Ghafoor of RJD won the Mahishi assembly seat defeating his nearest rival Raj Kumar Sah of JD(U). Contests in most years were multi cornered but only winners and runners up are being mentioned. Gunjeshwar Sah of JD(U) defeated Surendra Yadav representing RJD in October 2005. Surendra Yadav, contesting as an independent, defeated Dr. Abdul Ghafoor of RJD in February 2005. Dr. Abdul Ghafoor of RJD defeated Surendra Yadav representing JD(U) in 2000. Dr. Abdul Ghafoor of JD defeated Lahtan Choudhary of Congress in 1995. Anand Mohan of JD defeated Lahtan Choudhary of Congress in 1990. Lahtan Choudhary of Congress defeated Devanand Yadav of LD in 1985 and Satya Narayan Yadav of Congress (U) in 1980. Parameshwar Kumar of JP defeated Lahtan Choudhary of Congress in 1977.
