= Barh Assembly constituency =

Assembly constituency in Bihar

Coordinates: 25.47°N 85.71°E

Barh
- Constituency No. 179 for the Bihar Legislative Assembly

Constituency details
- Country: India
- Region: East India
- State: Bihar
- District: Patna
- Established: 1951
- Total electors: 292,909

Member of Legislative Assembly
- 18th Bihar Legislative Assembly
- Incumbent Siyaram Singh
- Party: BJP
- Alliance: NDA
- Elected year: 2025

Barh Assembly constituency is one of 243 constituencies of legislative assembly of Bihar. It comes under Munger Lok Sabha constituency along with other assembly constituencies. Barh is in the 14 assembly segments which fall under Patna district.

== Overview ==
Barh comprises CD Blocks Athmalgola, Belchi & Barh; Gram Panchayats Dhiwar, Parsawan, Goasa Shekhpura & Bihari Bigha of Pandarak CD Block.

== Members of the Legislative Assembly ==
Year	Name	Party
1952	Rana Sheolakh Pati Singh	Indian National Congress
1957	Ramyatan Singh	Indian National Congress
1962	Rana Sheolakh Pati Singh	Indian National Congress
1967	Tarini Prasad Singh	Jan Kranti Dal
1969	Rana Sheolakh Pati Singh	Indian National Congress
1972	Dwarika Nath Singh	Indian National Congress
1977	Rana Sheolakh Pati Singh	Janata Party
1980	Vishwa Mohan Choudhry	Independent
1985	Bhuvneshwar Singh	Indian National Congress
1990	Vijay Krishna	Janata Dal
1995	Vijay Krishna	Janata Dal
2000	Bhuvneshwar Singh	Samata Party
2005	Lovely Anand	Janata Dal (United)
2005	Gyanendra Singh	Janata Dal (United)
2010	Gyanendra Singh	Janata Dal (United)
2015	Gyanendra Singh	Bharatiya Janata Party
2020	Gyanendra Singh	Bharatiya Janata Party
2025	Siyaram Singh	Bharatiya Janata Party

== Election results ==
=== 2025 ===
2025 Bihar Legislative Assembly election: Barh
Party	Candidate	Votes	%	±%
BJP	Siyaram Singh	99,446	52.51	+19.57
RJD	Karnveer singh Yadav	74,633	39.41	
JSP	Mahesh Prasad Singh	3,473	1.83	
Independent	Sharvan Pandey	2,247	1.19	
NOTA	None of the above	3,631	1.92	+0.94
Majority		24,813	13.1	+6.26
Turnout		189,390	64.66	+11.21
BJP hold		Swing	NDA	

=== 2020 ===
2010 Bihar legislative assembly election: Barh
Party	Candidate	Votes	%	±%
BJP	Gyanendra Kumar Singh	49,327	32.94	−11.5
INC	Satyendra Bahadur Singh	39,087	26.1	
Independent	Karn Veer Yadav	38,406	25.65	
Independent	Ranveer Kumar "Pankaj"	5,959	3.98	
Independent	Rana Sudhir Kumar Singh	3,328	2.22	
Bhartiya Sablog Party	Rahul Raj	1,778	1.19	
JAP(L)	Shyam Deo Prasad Singh	1,437	0.96	−1.1
Independent	Raj Kumari	1,393	0.93	
NOTA	None of the above	1,461	0.98	−1.75
Majority		10,240	6.84	+1.04
Turnout		149,739	53.45	−1.83
BJP hold		Swing		

=== 2015 ===
2015 Bihar Legislative Assembly election: Barh
Party	Candidate	Votes	%	±%
BJP	Gyanendra Kumar Singh	63,989	44.44	
JD(U)	Manoj Kumar	55,630	38.64	
Independent	Neelu Devi	3,722	2.59	
Independent	Sanjay Singh	3,649	2.53	
CPI	Chakradhar Prasad Singh	3,576	2.48	
JAP(L)	Shambhu Singh	2,959	2.06	
Independent	Dina Saw	1,583	1.1	
BSP	Ravindra Paswan	1,547	1.07	
NOTA	None of the above	3,933	2.73	
Majority		8,359	5.8	
Turnout		143,974	55.28	
