= Abdul Ghafoor (Saharsa politician) =

Indian politician (1959–2020)

Dr. Abdul Ghafoor
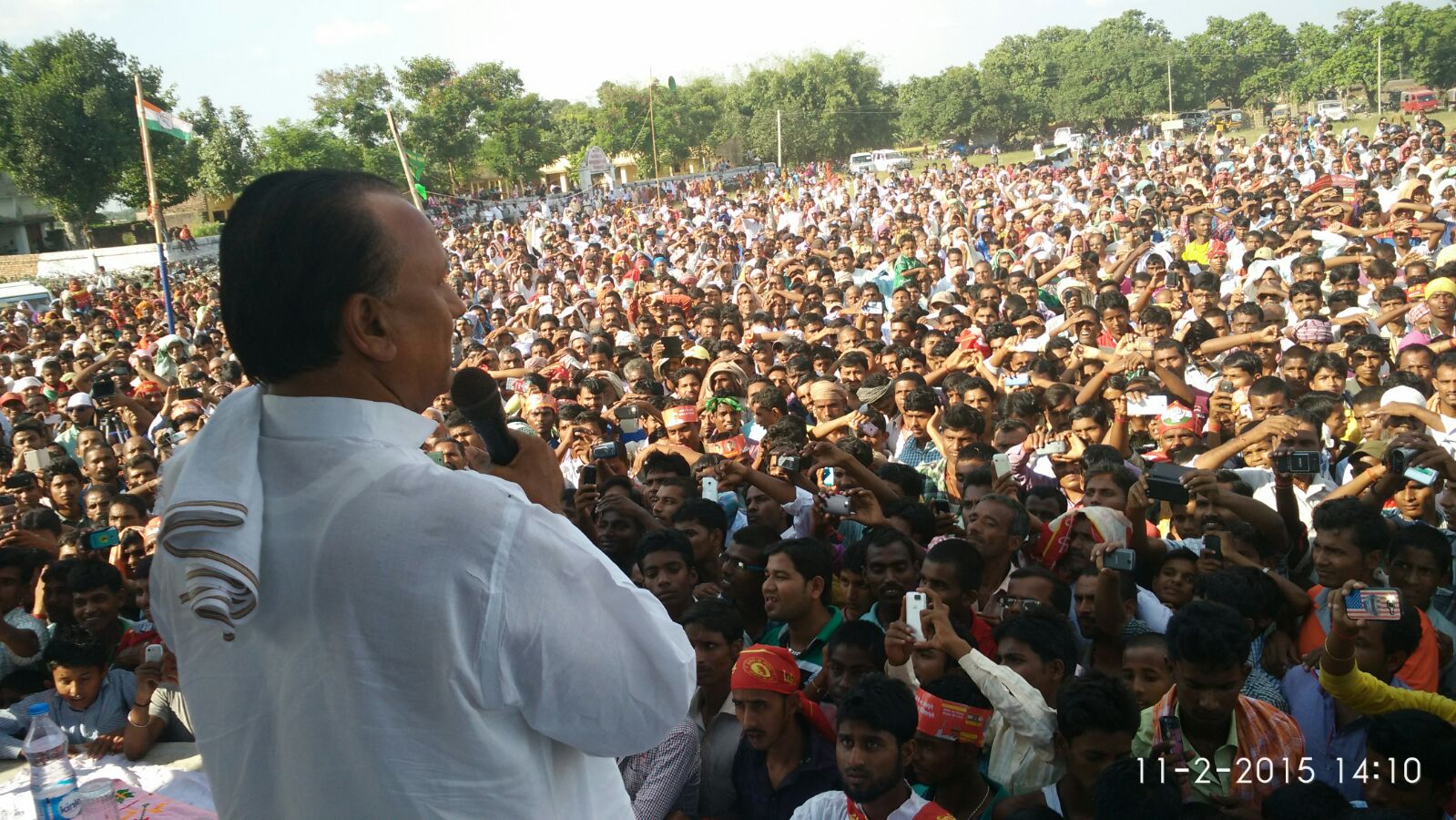
- At an election rally 2015

Minister of Minority Welfare, Bihar
- In office 20 November 2015 – 26 July 2017
- Preceded by: Naushad Alam
- Succeeded by: Khurshid Alam

Member of Legislative Assembly from Mahishi (JD (1995-1997) and RJD (1997-2020).
- In office 1995–2005
- Preceded by: Anand Mohan (JD)
- Succeeded by: Gunjeshwar Sah (JD(U))

Member of Legislative Assembly from Mahishi
- In office 2010–2020
- Preceded by: Gunjeshwar Sah (JD(U))

Chairman Of Bihar State Haj Committee
- In office Aug 2003 – 2006
- Preceded by: Shakil Ahmad Khan
- Succeeded by: Jamshed Ali

Personal details
- Born: 5 May 1959 Saharsa, Bihar, India
- Died: 28 January 2020 (aged 60) New Delhi, India
- Party: Rashtriya Janata Dal
- Relations: Abdur Razzaque (Son)
- Education: Patna University
- Profession: Social Service, Statesman and Educationist
- As of 24 February, 2020

Abdul Ghafoor: (Urdu: عبد الغفور; 5 May 1959 – 28 January 2020) was an Indian politician who served as Minister of Minority Welfare in government of Bihar from 20 November 2015 to 26 July 2017. He served as a member of the Bihar Legislative Assembly representing Mahishi vidhan sabha for 4 terms in 1995, 2000, 2010 and 2015. His political party was Rashtriya Janata Dal (RJD).

== Early life and education ==
Ghafoor was born to a farmer Md. Jamal and Bibi Fatima on 5 May 1959 in a small village of Bauharwa in Saharsa district of Bihar. He finished his early education (Matriculation) from Islamia High School, Simri Bakhtiyarpur, Saharsa in 1974. He completed his higher Secondary in 1976. He graduated (B.A.) from Saharsa College, Saharsa in 1979. Later on, he moved to Patna to pursue Masters in Arts (M.A.) from Patna University in 1981. He held a PhD degree in Urdu from Patna University. He was a professor of Urdu at Parvati Science College Madhepura since 1982, a position he held till his death in 2020.

== Political objective ==
Inspired by the leadership and ideologies of Prameshwar Kunwar he was inclined towards politics from his early youth. His inspiration deepened after the famous JP movement. Being associated with the village, he was involved in the main issues and personally felt the basic needs of the poor people and the minority community. He always believed that they should be given an equal chance to grow, live and prosper on par with the other privileged people. He continuously strove for the upliftment of the backward and underprivileged section of the society. Secularism and Socialism were the two pillars of his politics. He was always seen as one of the cleanest politicians of the state. He was often referred as Gandhi of Kosi by his colleagues and followers.

== Political career ==
He first contested on a Janata Dal ticket from Mahishi Vidhan sabha and defeated the veteran congress leader and freedom fighter Lahtan Choudharyof Congress in 1995. In 1998 when the Janata Dal split due to the differences between Sharad Yadav and Lalu Prasad Yadav to form Rashtriya Janata Dal (RJD) and Janata Dal (United), he chose Lalu Prasad Yadav and joined RJD. He won convincingly in 2000 from an RJD ticket by a huge margin of approximately 20,000 votes defeating Surendra Yadav, an independent candidate. In the debacle and toppling of Lalu Yadav in 2005 election, he lost from Mahishi to Surendra Yadav marginally. The assembly could not be formed due to unclear mandate hence state was forced into fresh election. In the re-election he was asked to shift his constituency to Saharsa Vidhan Sabha Constituency. Accepting the party decision he contested from Saharsa in Oct 2005 election and lost to BJP's Sanjiv Jha by approximately 6000 votes.

He worked hard and connected to the masses in the villages of his native assembly Mahishi and was determined to bounce back into the Bihar politics. His dedication and tireless effort was rewarded, and he was given back his home constituency of Mahishi in 2010 elections. Though Lalu Yadav's RJD was very badly defeated, he came victorious as the lone RJD candidate from the Koshi region defeating RajKumar sah of JD(U)by a margin of 1717 votes.

== Election 2015 ==
Assumed to be a direct fight between the Grand alliance of RJD, JD(U) and INC, Vs NDA. RJD contested election on 101 Seats, JDU on 101, Congress on 41. Ghafoor once again contesting from the Mahishi seat defeated the nearest rival Chandan Kumar Sah by a comprehensive margin on 26,135 votes. This Victory would make Ghafoor the longest serving MLA from Mahishi. Grand Alliance got a Landslide victory by claiming 178 out of 243 seats while BJP+ managed a mere 58 seats. However, this alliance lasted only 20 months when Nitish Kumar resigned on 26 July 2017 at 5 PM following JD(U)'s remarriage to BJP and re-forming the government on 27 July 2017 at 10 AM.

Ghafoor was sworn in as the Minority Welfare minister in the Nitish Kumar government on 20 November 2015. He was in charge of the ministry until the resignation of Mr Nitish Kumar on 26 July 2017 following his breakaway from Mahagathbandhan and subsequent merger with NDA.

== Death and legacy ==
Ghafoor was diagnosed with advanced stage of liver cancer in December 2019 and was admitted to AIIMS, New Delhi, for treatment. His health never fully recovered and breathed last on 28 January 2020 6:15 AM at ILBS, New Delhi.

CM Nitish Kumar condoled the demise or one of the finest leader of Bihar and announced that Ghafoor would be buried with full State Honors. His body wrapped in Indian Flag was flown to Patna where Guard of Honor was given at the Airport followed by the Chief Minister Shri Nitish Kumar, Governor of Bihar Shri Phagu Chauhan, Bihar State Congress Minority Chairman Minnat Rahmani along with the leader from all over Bihar paying their respect at Vidhan Sabha. RJD Leaders like Tejashwi Yadav, State RJD Chief Jagada Nand Singh, Former Minister Abdul Bari Siddiqui and others paid their respect at the RJD Headquarters in Patna.

Namaz-e-Janaza was held at the ancestral village Bauharwa in Saharsa which was attended by more than 70,000 well wishers. He was honored with gun salute and buried at the ancestral quabristan in presence of the family members, DM, SP, politicians from across party line for State Funeral on 29 January 2020.

== Others ==
He was also the chairman of Bihar State haj Committee and held the post between 2003 and 2006.
