= Sheohar Assembly constituency =

Coordinates: 26°31′N 85°18′E

Sheohar
- Constituency No. 22 for the Bihar Legislative Assembly

Constituency details
- Country: India
- Region: East India
- State: Bihar
- Division: Tirhut
- District: Sheohar
- Lok Sabha constituency: Sheohar
- Established: 1951
- Total electors: 304,871
- Reservation: None

Member of Legislative Assembly
- 18th Bihar Legislative Assembly
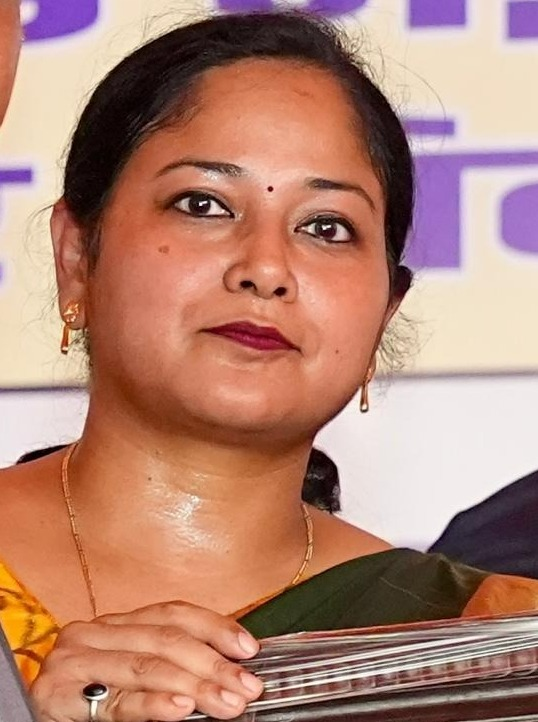
- Incumbent Shweta Gupta
- Party: JD(U)
- Alliance: NDA
- Elected year: 2025
- Preceded by: Chetan Anand Singh

Sheohar Assembly constituency (Hindi pronunciation: Shivahar Vidhan Sabha Nirvachan Kshetra) is an assembly constituency in Sheohar district in the Indian state of Bihar.

== Overview ==
As per orders of Delimitation of Parliamentary and Assembly constituencies Order, 2008, 22. Sheohar Assembly constituency is composed of the following: Sheohar, Piprarhi, Dumri Katsari and Purnahiya community development blocks.

Sheohar Assembly constituency is part of 4. Sheohar Lok Sabha constituency.

== Members of the Legislative Assembly ==
Year	Name	Party
1952	Ram Swaroop Ram	Independent
1957	Thakur Girijanandan Singh	Independent
1962	Chitaranjan Singh	Indian National Congress
1967	Thakur Girijanandan Singh	Independent
1969	Thakur Girijanandan Singh	Bharatiya Kranti Dal
1972	Raghunath Jha	Indian National Congress
1977	Raghunath Jha	Indian National Congress
1980	Raghunath Jha	Indian National Congress (I)
1985	Raghunath Jha	Janata Party
1990	Raghunath Jha	Janata Dal
1995	Raghunath Jha	Janata Dal
1998^	Thakur Ratnakar	Rashtriya Janata Dal
2000	Satyanarayan Prasad	Rashtriya Janata Dal
2005	Ajit Kumar Jha	Rashtriya Janata Dal
2005	Ajit Kumar Jha	Rashtriya Janata Dal
2010	Sharfuddin	Janata Dal (United)
2015	Sharfuddin	Janata Dal (United)
2020	Chetan Anand Singh	Rashtriya Janata Dal
2025	Shweta Gupta	Janata Dal (United)

== Election results ==
=== 2025 ===
2025 Bihar Legislative Assembly election: Sheohar
Party	Candidate	Votes	%	±%
JD(U)	Shweta Gupta	97,269	46.29	▲25.01
RJD	Navneet Kumar (Jha)	65,871	31.35	▼11.34
BSP	Md Sharfuddin	16,469	7.84	▲5.48
JSP	Niraj Singh	13,952	6.64	
Independent	Vijay Chandra Jha	4,466	2.13	
NOTA	None of the above	4,842	2.3	▲0.13
Majority		31,398	14.94	▼6.47
Turnout		210,111	68.92	▲12.4
JD(U) gain from RJD		Swing		

=== 2020 ===
2020 Bihar Legislative Assembly election: Sheohar
Party	Candidate	Votes	%	±%
RJD	Chetan Anand	73,143	42.69	
JD(U)	Mohammad Sharfuddin	36,457	21.28	▼8.43
LJP	Vijay Kumar Pandey	18,748	10.94	
Independent	Radha Kant Gupta	14,178	8.28	
BSP	Sanjeev Kumar Gupta	4,049	2.36	▲0.42
Independent	Virendra Pra. Yadav	4,030	2.35	
Janta Dal Rashtravadi	Shrinarayan Singh	3,952	2.31	
JAP(L)	Mohammed Wamique	3,415	1.99	
Independent	Sanjay Sangharsh Singh	2,934	1.71	
NOTA	None of the above	3,711	2.17	▼0.75
Majority		36,686	21.41	▲21.1
Turnout		171,326	56.52	▲1.7
RJD gain from JDU		Swing		

=== 2015 ===
2015 Bihar Legislative Assembly election: Sheohar
Party	Candidate	Votes	%	±%
JD(U)	Mohammad Sharfuddin	44,576	29.71	
HAM(S)	Lovely Anand	44,115	29.4	
Independent	Thakur Ratnakar	22,309	14.87	
SP	Ajit Kumar Jha	15,891	10.59	
Socialist Party (India)	Manoj Kumar	3,684	2.46	
Independent	Manoj Upadhyay	3,418	2.28	
BSP	Mohammad Imamudin	2,906	1.94	
Independent	Sanjay Kumar	2,834	1.89	
Garib Janta Dal (Secular)	Quamruzzama	2,370	1.58	
Independent	Manisha Devi	2,028	1.35	
AIFB	Akhilesh Kumar Singh	1,535	1.02	
NOTA	None of the above	4,383	2.92	
Majority		461	0.31	
Turnout		150,049	54.82	
