= Chetan Anand =

Chetan Anand may refer to:

- Chetan Anand (badminton) (born 1980), Indian badminton player
- Chetan Anand (director) (1921–1997), Bollywood personality
- Chetan Anand (politician) (born 1991), Indian politician from Bihar
