= Gyanendra Kumar Singh Gyanu =

Indian politician

Gyanendra Kumar Singh (Gyanu)
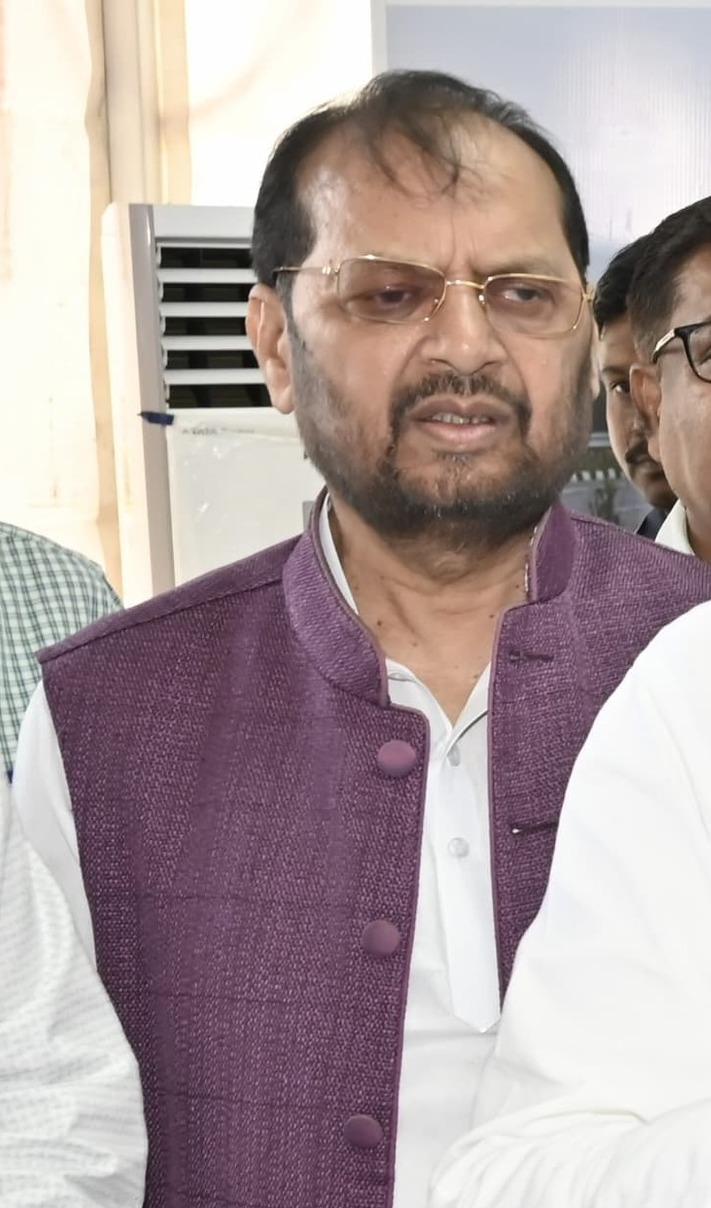

Member of Bihar Legislative Assembly
- In office 2005–2025
- Preceded by: Lovely Anand
- Succeeded by: Siyaram Singh
- Constituency: Barh

Personal details
- Born: 19 June 1959 (age 67)
- Party: Bharatiya Janata Party
- Parent: Kamal Prasad Singh
- Education: Graduation
- Occupation: MLA
- Profession: Social Service

Gyanendra Kumar Singh, also known as Gyanu, is an Indian politician, currently a member of BJP and four time Member Of Legislative Assembly from Barh (Vidhan Sabha constituency). The first two elections he won as a Janata Dal (United) candidate and the last two as BJP candidate.

Recently he questioned BJP state leadership and accused party ministers of taking bribes.
