= Shweta Gupta =

Indian politician

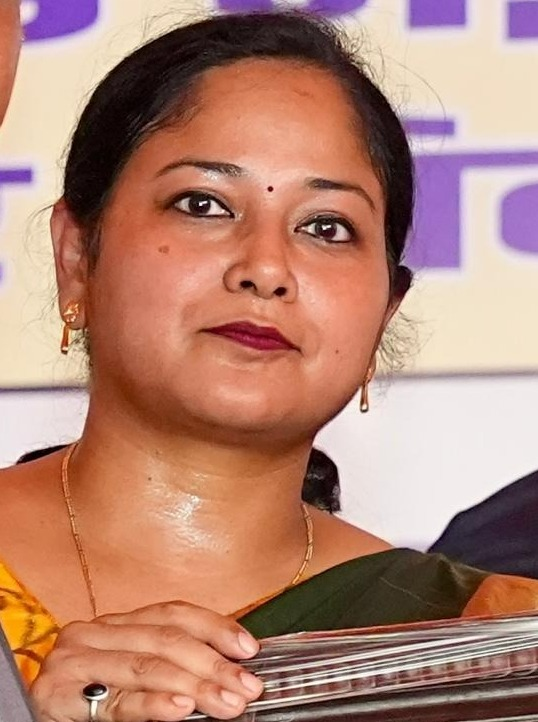

Minister of Social Welfare Government of Bihar
- Incumbent
- Assumed office 07 May 2026
- Chief Minister: Samrat Choudhary
- Preceded by: Bijendra Prasad Yadav

Member of the Bihar Legislative Assembly
- Incumbent
- Assumed office 14 November 2025
- Preceded by: Chetan Anand
- Constituency: Sheohar

Personal details
- Party: Janata Dal (United)
- Education: Maharashtra University of Health Sciences, Lalit Narayan Mithila University
- Profession: Politician, Doctor

Shweta Gupta is an Indian politician from Bihar. She is elected as a Member of Legislative Assembly in 2025 Bihar Legislative Assembly election from Sheohar constituency. She is a member of the Janata Dal (United)
