= Vijay Kumar Singh (Bihar) =

Indian politician

Members of Bihar Legislative Assembly
- In office November 2020 – 14 November 2025
- Preceded by: Virendra Kumar Singh
- Succeeded by: Chetan Anand
- Constituency: Nabinagar

Personal details
- Party: Rashtriya Janata Dal

Vijay Kumar Singh (born 1977), also known as Dabloo Singh, is an Indian politician from Bihar. He is a member of Bihar Legislative Assembly of India winning the 2020 Bihar Legislative Assembly election representing Rashtriya Janata Dal from Nabinagar.

== Early life and education ==
Singh is from Kutumba, Aurangabad district, Bihar. He is the son of Mathura Prasad Singh. He completed his matriculation in 1983 through National Open School, Delhi.

== Career ==
Singh won from Nabinagar Assembly constituency representing Rashtriya Janata Dal in the 2020 Bihar Legislative Assembly election. He polled 64,943 votes and defeated his nearest rival, Virendra Kumar Singh of Janata Dal (United), by a margin of 20,121 votes. He was first elected as an MLA in October 2005 Bihar Legislative Assembly election representing Lok Janshakti Party.
