= Sharfuddin (politician) =

Indian politician

Member of the Bihar Legislative Assembly
- In office 2010–2020
- Preceded by: Ajit Kumar Jha
- Succeeded by: Chetan Anand Singh
- Constituency: Sheohar

Personal details
- Born: Mahuawa, Sheohar district, Bihar
- Party: Janata Dal (United)

Mohammad Sharfuddin is an Indian politician who served as a Member of the Bihar Legislative Assembly from Sheohar Assembly constituency representing the Janata Dal (United) from 2010 to 2020.
