= Gautam Krishna =

Indian politician

Member of Bihar Legislative Assembly
- Incumbent
- Assumed office 2025
- Preceded by: Gunjeshwar Sah
- Constituency: Mahishi Assembly constituency

Personal details
- Born: Saharsa district, Bihar, India
- Party: RJD
- Education: •TP College,Madhepura (Intermediate) • Patna College (Graduation) • Patna University (PhD)
- Occupation: Politics; Former Civil Servant

Gautam Krishna is an Indian Politician and former Block Development Officer (BDO) from Bihar and a Member of the Bihar Legislative Assembly. Krishna won the Mahishi Assembly constituency of Saharsa district on the RJD ticket in the 2025 Bihar Legislative Assembly election. He was the topper of Patna College in his batch and a gold medalist of Patna University.

== Political career ==
Gautam Krishna began his political journey in 2015 after resigning from his position as Block Development Officer (BDO) to contest the assembly elections from the Mahishi constituency on a Jan Adhikar Party (Loktantrik) ticket, though he was unsuccessful. He joined the Rashtriya Janata Dal (RJD) in 2020 and again contested from Mahishi, losing narrowly by just 1,630 votes to the incumbent JD(U) candidate Gunjeshwar Sah.

In 2023, Krishna was appointed State Vice-President of the RJD Youth Wing, strengthening his role within the party organization. During 2024, he led major flood relief campaigns in the Kosi region, addressing issues such as flood management, youth employment, and social justice for backward classes.

Krishna achieved electoral success in the 2025 2025 Bihar Legislative Assembly election, winning the Mahishi seat with 93,752 votes and defeating JD(U)'s Gunjeshwar Sah by a margin of 3,740 votes. His victory was notable as one of the few seats won by the opposition in a region dominated by the National Democratic Alliance (NDA).
