= Anand Mohan Singh =

Indian criminal and politician

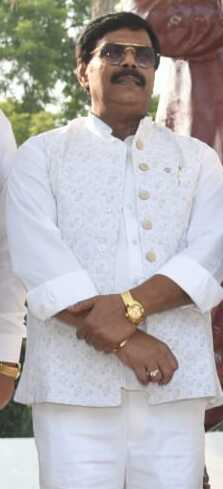

Member (MLA) in Bihar Legislative Assembly
- In office 1990–1995
- Preceded by: Lahtan Choudhary
- Succeeded by: Abdul Ghafoor
- Constituency: Mahishi

Member of Parliament in Lok Sabha
- In office 1996–1999
- Preceded by: Hari Kishore Singh
- Succeeded by: Md Anwarul Haque
- Constituency: Sheohar

Personal details
- Born: 28 January 1954 (age 72)
- Party: Bihar People's Party
- Other political affiliations: Janata Dal
- Spouse: Lovely Anand (m. 1991)
- Children: 3 (including Chetan Anand)

Anand Mohan Singh (born 28 January 1954) is a politician and founder of the now-defunct Bihar People's Party (BPP). He served life imprisonment for instigating killing of Gopalganj district magistrate, G. Krishnaiah in 1994. In April 2023, Government of Bihar amended jail rules for his early release.

== Early life ==
Anand Mohan Singh comes from Pachgachhia village in Saharsa district, Bihar. He belongs to Rajput Family. He is the grandson of Ram Bahadur Singh, an Indian freedom fighter. His introduction to politics came through involvement with the Sampoorna Kranti movement of Jayaprakash Narayan, which caused him to drop out of college in 1974.

== Imprisonment ==
Singh has had numerous charges filed against him at various times, many of which were either dropped or resulted in acquittal. He and six other people, including his wife Lovely Anand, were accused in relation to the 1994 murder of a Dalit District Magistrate (DM) from Gopalganj, G. Krishnaiah, who was lynched on a major highway near to Muzaffarpur during a funeral cortege for the BPP member and gangster, Chhotan Shukla. In 2007, the Patna High Court sentenced him to death for abetting the crime. The sentence was reduced to rigorous life imprisonment in 2008, when the six other accused were also acquitted due to lack of evidence. The reduction was because there was no evidence that Singh was the actual assailant. In 2012 Singh failed in his appeal to the Supreme Court of India against the reduced sentence. The same Supreme Court hearing dismissed an appeal from the Government of Bihar for reinstatement of the death penalty and for an overturning of the acquittal of the six other people. (Note: Aside from Singh's wife, Lovely Anand, the other accused were former State Minister Akhlaq Ahmed and former MLA Arun Kumar, Vijay Kumar Shukla alias Munna Shukla, Shashi Shekhar and Harendra Kumar. The person adjudged to have shot Krishnaiah was Bhutkun Shukla.)

At the time of the original sentence in 2007, Singh was the first Indian politician since independence to have been given a death penalty. Soon after that sentence, upon being transferred from Patna's Beur jail to that of Bhagalpur, Singh went on hunger strike in protest of the facilities and being split from Akhlaq Ahmed and Arun Kumar, who had received death penalties in the same case. The jail authorities were unsympathetic, noting that rules dictated those sentenced to death should sleep on the floor and be allowed only simple food.

In April 2023, Bihar Chief Minister Nitish Kumar tweaked jail rules for his early release.

== Influence ==
Despite being in prison, Singh aided his wife, Lovely Anand, whom he had married in 1991, in standing as an INC candidate in the 2010 Bihar Assembly elections and as a Samajwadi Party candidate in the 2014 general elections. The Supreme Court had barred convicted criminals from standing in elections but he still has much influence. She has claimed that her husband is the victim of a political conspiracy.

People from his home village of Panchgachiya consider him to be a Robin Hood figure and recently Anand Mohan was released from jail in a 30-year-old murder case to attend his son's engagement ceremony, which was attended by leaders of the ruling coalition, including CM Nitish Kumar. Tehelka said in 2007 that

it was his muscleman image that made Mohan’s name synonymous with terror in Bihar’s poverty-ridden Saharsa-Supaul belt for the past 20 years. He and Munna Shukla faced several criminal cases, many of them for murder, in various courts across Bihar. While Shukla still remains a dreaded figure around Muzaffarpur and Vaishali districts in north Bihar, Mohan is notorious in the Saharsa-Supaul belt as a criminal and sometimes as a kind of folk hero.

== Release from prison and afterwards ==
In 2023, Government of Bihar under Nitish Kumar amended the prison manual of the state of Bihar, which prohibited any leniency in the matter of punishment to those guilty of killing any government official. This paved the way for release of Anand Mohan from the prison, where he was lodged in connection with the murder of Gopalganj District Magistrate, G. Krishnaiah. Political analysts of Bihar saw this step as a bid to win over the Rajput voters, as the traditional vote banks of every political party was intruded to some extent by Bharatiya Janata Party in state. According to these analysts, the Rashtriya Janata Dal and Janata Dal (United) political party saw their traditional voters drifting towards the BJP. Hence, the release of Mohan was planned to woo the Rajput community to which latter belonged. In September-October 2023, Mohan became a part of controversy, which erupted over Manoj Jha's recitation of Thakur ka Kuan poem of Om Prakash Valmiki. While Jha clarified that he didn't speak against any caste, but attacked the influential section of society through the poem which signified the social dominance enjoyed by some caste groups and miserable life of poor, Mohan took it as a defamatory statement made against his Rajput caste. Consequently, he made threatening remarks against Jha, and was supported by many Rajput politicians of the state. It was speculated that through this controversy, Mohan was trying to enter the state politics by becoming more acceptable among his community members by posing himself as their defender. It was also believed that Mohan was disgusted by his treatment earlier at the residence of Lalu Prasad Yadav, where he visited along with his wife Lovely Anand. It was reported that he had to stand on the gate of Yadav's residence for some time, before he was told that Yadav couldn't meet him. These events also caused speculations that he might join the Bharatiya Janata Party.

This caste feud in the state between Brahmins and Rajputs became sharp after Lalu Prasad Yadav extended his support to Manoj Jha, calling him as an intellectual. Yadav also criticised Mohan and his son Chetan Anand that they will only speak within boundaries of their intellect.

== Writings ==
He has written two anthologies of poems while imprisoned, Quaid mei Azad Kalam (Pen is free behind bars, 2011) and Swadheen Abhivyakti (2014). Gandhi kektas ke phool (2020)

== See also ==
- Caste politics in India
- Anant Kumar Singh
- Pradeep Mahto
- Ashok Mahto gang
- Jagdish Mahto
