= Lovely Anand =

Indian politician

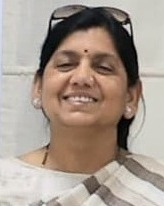

Member of Parliament, Lok Sabha
- Incumbent
- Assumed office 4 June 2024
- Preceded by: Rama Devi
- Constituency: Sheohar
- In office 1994–1996
- Preceded by: Shivsharan Singh
- Succeeded by: Raghuvansh Prasad Singh
- Constituency: Vaishali

Member of Bihar Legislative Assembly
- In office 2005–2005
- Preceded by: Bhuveshwar Singh
- Succeeded by: Gyanendra Kumar Singh
- Constituency: Barh
- In office 1996–2000
- Preceded by: Virendra Kumar Singh
- Succeeded by: Bheem Kumar Yadav
- Constituency: Nabinagar

Personal details
- Born: 12 December 1966 (age 59)
- Party: Janata Dal (United)
- Other political affiliations: Hindustani Awam Morcha; Rashtriya Janata Dal; Samajwadi Party; Indian National Congress; Samata Party; Bihar People's Party
- Spouse: Anand Mohan Singh
- Children: Chetan Anand Singh, Surbhi Anand, Anshuman Anand

Lovely Anand is an Indian politician from the Janata Dal United, and a Member of Parliament representing Sheohar (Lok Sabha constituency) in Bihar, India and former Member of the Bihar Legislative Assembly. She also served as a member of 10th Lok Sabha, the lower house of the Parliament of India.

She comes from a well connected political family as her mother's cousin Madhuri Singh was a member of parliament in 1980's from Congress party. But her political career started as the debutant candidate for the new Bihar People's Party established by her husband, Anand Mohan Singh, Lovely Anand had defeated a heavyweight parliamentarian Kishori Sinha, the wife of former Bihar Chief Minister Satyendra Narayan Sinha, in a 1994 Lok Sabha by-election in the north Bihar constituency of Vaishali. She did not contest the 1996 elections and failed to re-win it in those of 1999.

Kishori Sinha also happened to be mother in law of her cousin and former MP Shyama Singh (daughter of Madhuri Singh).

Anand has also twice been elected as a Member of the Legislative Assembly (MLA) of Bihar, winning once in Barh and again in Nabinagar.

Her husband is Anand Mohan Singh, whom she had married in 1991, and who had engineered her 1994 by-election success. He had twice been the MP for Sheohar, in 1996 and 1998, and his wife stood as a Samajwadi Party candidate there in the 2014 general election. She claimed that she had switched party allegiance because the Indian National Congress (INC) had "neglected" her after she had unsuccessfully stood as their candidate in that constituency in the 2009 national election (Note: According to Arun Sinha, Lovely Anand was one of several wives of convicted criminals who were put forward for election by their husbands as a proxy in 2009 when courts rejected most of the husbands' appeals to stand in their own right. They were following a model adopted by Lalu Prasad Yadav and his wife, Rabri Devi, but "got the greatest shock of their life when voters rejected their dummies". She finished in fourth place with 81,479 votes.) and in the Alamnagar constituency at the 2010 Bihar Assembly elections.

In 2015, Anand became involved with the Hindustani Awam Morcha party and contested from Sheohar constituency. She lost the elections by a margin of around 400 votes.

Anand has continued to protest the innocence of her husband, standing for election on that basis and claiming that her husband is the victim of a political conspiracy and has never been a criminal or gang leader. She and some others had been found guilty in the same case as that of her husband, which was determined in 2007 when she was a member of the JDU party, but she later obtained bail and was acquitted on appeal to the High Court. (Note: Anand was a member of Janata Dal (United) between 2005-2007.)

Anand has a BA degree from Ranchi University. She and her husband have 2 sons and a daughter; her son, Chetan Anand, has also expressed a desire to be elected.

== See also ==
- Politics of Bihar
