= Akhlaq Ahmed (politician) =

Indian politician

Akhlaq Ahmed is an Indian politician. He was elected to the Bihar Legislative Assembly from Bikramganj in the 2000 Bihar Legislative Assembly election Samata Party (now led by Uday Mandal its President) and February 2005 Bihar Legislative Assembly election in as a member of the Rashtriya Janata Dal. He joined Pappu Yadav's Jan Adhikar Party in 2015.
