= Gunjeshwar Sah =

Indian politician

Bihar Legislative Assembly
- Succeeded by: Gautam Krishna
- Constituency: Mahishi Assembly constituency

Personal details
- Party: JD(U)
- Occupation: Politics

Gunjeshwar Sah is an Indian politician from Bihar and a Member of the Bihar Legislative Assembly. Sah won the Mahishi Assembly constituency on JD(U) ticket in the 2020 Bihar Legislative Assembly election.
