= Virendra Kumar Singh =

Indian politician

Member Of Legislative Assembly
- In office 2015 – November 2020
- Succeeded by: Vijay Kumar Singh (Bihar)
- Constituency: Nabinagar
- In office 2010–2015
- Preceded by: Vijay Kumar Singh
- Constituency: Nabinagar

Member of Parliament, Lok Sabha
- In office 1996–1998
- Preceded by: Ram Naresh Singh
- Succeeded by: Sushil Kumar Singh
- Constituency: Aurangabad, Bihar

Personal details
- Born: 2 April 1953 (age 73) Tal, Aurangabad District, Bihar, India
- Party: Janata Dal (United)
- Other political affiliations: Janata Dal
- Spouse: Leena Singh

Virendra Kumar Singh is an Indian politician. He was elected to the Lok Sabha, the lower house of the Parliament of India from the Aurangabad in Bihar, as a member of the Janata Dal. He is the former MLA for Nabinagar.
