= Chetan Anand (politician) =

Indian politician

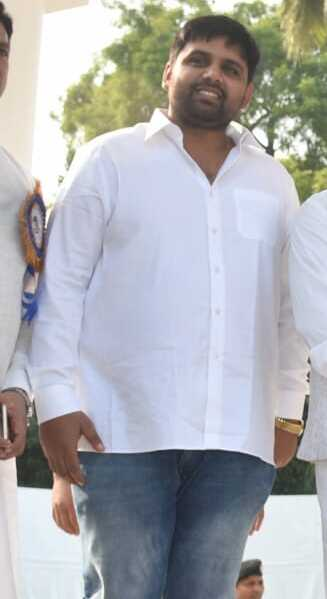

Member of the Bihar Legislative Assembly
- Incumbent
- Assumed office 2025
- Preceded by: Vijay Kumar Singh
- Constituency: Nabinagar
- In office 2020–2025
- Preceded by: Sharfuddin
- Succeeded by: Shweta Gupta
- Constituency: Sheohar

Personal details
- Born: 20 November 1991 (age 34)
- Party: Janta Dal United (14 Feb 2024-present) Rashtriya Janata Dal (2020–2024); Hindustan Awam Morcha (2015–2020)
- Parents: Anand Mohan Singh (father); Lovely Anand (mother)

Chetan Anand (born 20 November 1991) is an Indian politician from the state of Bihar. He is elected as a Member of the Legislative Assembly (MLA) from Sheohar constituency representing the Rashtriya Janata Dal (RJD) in the 2020 election to the Bihar Legislative Assembly.He was then elected to the Nabinagar constituency on a JD(U) ticket in 2025 election by a mere margin of 112 votes. He is also a member of the State-Level Programme Implementation Committee.

== Early life ==
Alumni of Welham Boys' School Chetan Anand is the son of Anand Mohan Singh, a former Member of Parliament (MP) and an MLA, and Lovely Anand, who is also an MP.

== Political career ==
Anand started his official political career with Jitan Ram Manjhi's Party Hindustani Awam Morcha as National president of the party's student wing in 2015. He along with his mother Lovely Anand, joined RJD in late September 2020 ahead of 2020 Bihar Legislative Assembly election. He contested the Sheohar constituency and won the Position of MLA. He has been campaigning for the release of his father, Anand Mohan, who was convicted of abetting murder. There were reports of him pledging his salary for public help during COVID-19 lockdown in India.
