= Bihar People's Party =

Former Indian political party

Bihar People's Party was a political party in the Indian state of Bihar, founded in 1993 by former leader of the Samajwadi Krantikari Sena and former Janata Dal MLA, Anand Mohan Singh.

Singh's wife, Lovely Anand, won a by-election to the Lok Sabha (the lower house of the Parliament of India) from the north Bihar constituency of Vaishali in 1994 by defeating veteran leader Kishori Sinha, wife of Bihar stalwart and former Chief Minister Satyendra Narain Sinha. The party then fielded around 100 candidates in the 1995 state assembly elections, with Anand Mohan Singh himself standing and losing in three separate constituencies.

BPP then joined with the Samata Party and Singh was elected to the Lok Sabha as a candidate of that party in 1996, then as an All India Rashtriya Janata Party candidate in 1998. In 1999 BPP contested the Lok Sabha polls in alliance with the Bharatiya Janata Party and the Janata Dal (United).

The party contested the 2000 Bihar legislative election in alliance with the Bharatiya Janata Party and the Jharkhand People's Party. The party won two seats, contesting as independents.

BPP merged with the Indian National Congress party in February 2004.

== See also ==
- List of massacres in Bihar
