= 2000 Bihar Legislative Assembly election =

Election in India

- 12 to 22 February 2000

All 324 seats of the Bihar Legislative Assembly 163 seats needed for a majority
- Turnout: 62.57%
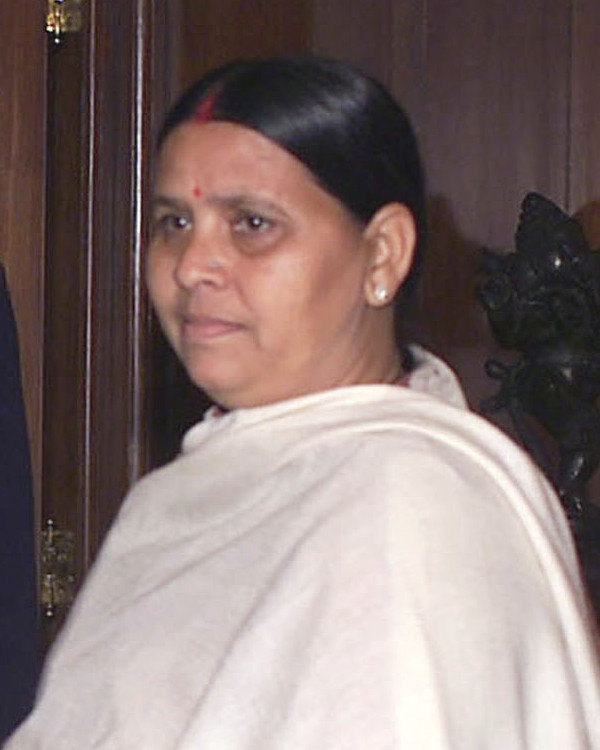

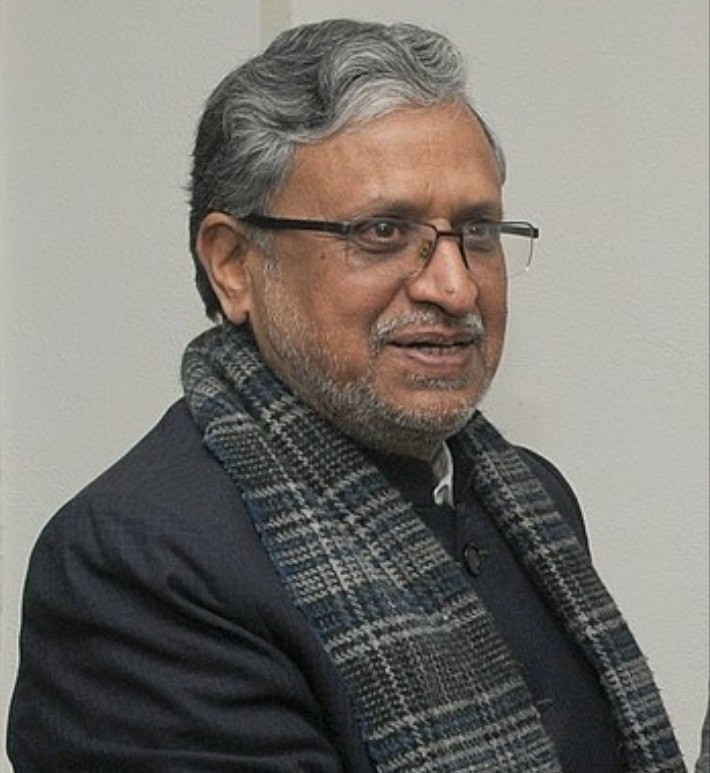

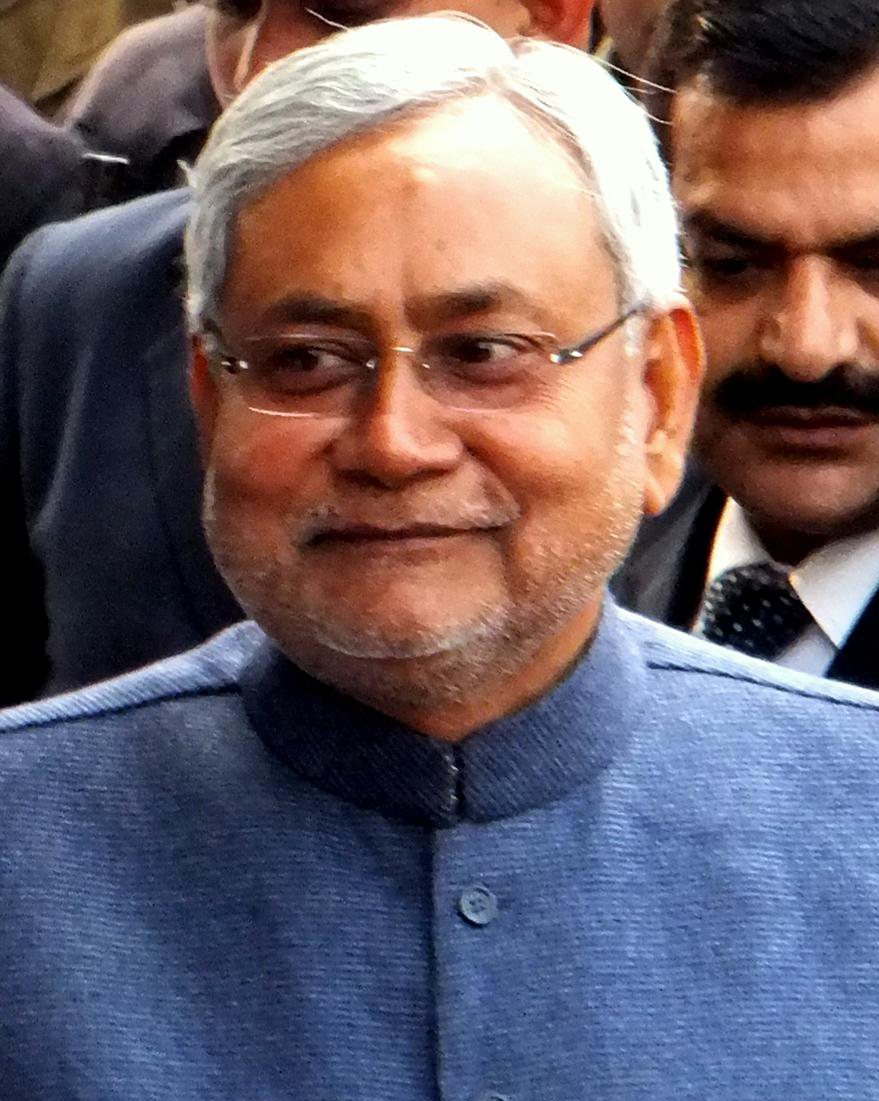

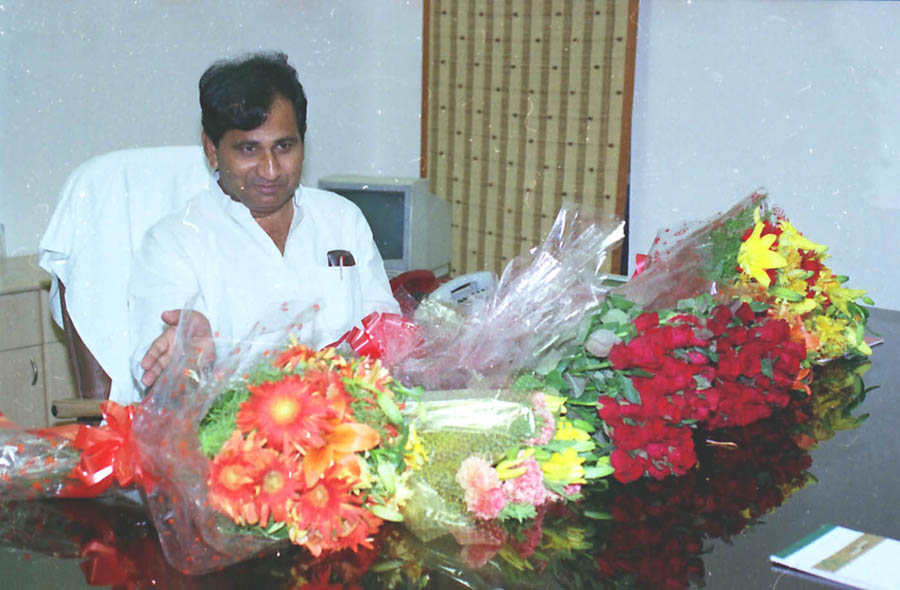
	Majority party	Minority party
Leader	Rabri Devi	Sushil Modi
Party	RJD	BJP
Alliance	RJD-CPI(M)	NDA
Leader since	1997	1997
Leader's seat	Raghopur (by-election)	Patna Central
Seats before	New	41
Seats won	124	67
Seat change	New	▲26
Popular vote	10,500,361	5,424,687
Percentage	28.34%	14.64%
Swing	New	▲1.68%
	Third party	Fourth party
Leader	Nitish Kumar	Shakeel Ahmad
Party	SAP	INC
Alliance	NDA
Leader since	1994	2000
Leader's seat	Did not contest	Bisfi
Seats before	7	29
Seats won	34	23
Seat change	▲27	▼6
Popular vote	3,205,746	4,096,467
Percentage	8.65%	11.06%
Swing	▲1.59%	▼5.21%
CM before election
Rabri Devi
RJD
Elected CM
Nitish Kumar
SAP

Legislative Assembly elections were held in February 2000, to elect the 324 members of the Bihar Legislative Assembly. The Rashtriya Janata Dal won the most seats, but a short-lived government was formed by an alliance that included the Bharatiya Janata Party and the Samata Party. The voter turnout in the 2000 assembly polls was 62.6%.

== Background ==
Between 1990 and 2000, Bihar's per capita income, according to a World Bank estimate, fell from ₹ 1,373 to ₹ 1,289. Power consumption in Bihar went down from 84 KWH to 60 KWH and it registered the lowest number of Internet users among Indian states. As per a Business Today -Gallup survey in December 1999, Bihar was the worst state in India for investment.

In 1999 Lok Sabha elections Rashtriya Janata Dal received a setback at the hand of BJP+JD(U) combine. The new coalition emerged leading in 199 out of 324 assembly constituencies and it was widely believed that in the forthcoming election to Bihar state assembly elections, the Lalu-Rabri rule will come to an end. The RJD had fought the election in an alliance with the Congress but the coalition didn't work making state leadership of Congress believe that the maligned image of Lalu Prasad after his name was drawn in the Fodder Scam had eroded his support base. Consequently, Congress decided to fight the 2000 assembly elections alone.

The RJD had to be satisfied with the communist parties as coalition partners but the seat-sharing conundrum in the camp of National Democratic Alliance made Kumar pull his Samta Party out of the Sharad Yadav and Ram Vilas Paswan faction of the Janata Dal. Differences also arose between the BJP and Kumar as the latter wanted to be projected as the Chief Minister of Bihar but the former was not in favour. Even Paswan also wanted to be a CM face. The Muslims and OBCs were too divided in their opinion. A section of Muslims, which included the poor communities like Pasmanda were of the view that Lalu only strengthened upper Muslims like Shaikh, Sayyid and Pathans and they were in search of new options.

Yadav also alienated other dominant backward castes like Koeri and Kurmi since his projection as the saviour of Muslims. It is argued by Sanjay Kumar that the belief that, "the dominant OBCs like the twin caste of Koeri-Kurmi will ask for share in power if he (Yadav) seeks their support while the Muslims will remain satisfied with the protection during communal riots only" made Yadav neglect them. Moreover, the divisions in both the camps made the political atmosphere in the state a charged one in which many parties were fighting against each other with no visible frontiers. JD(U) and BJP were fighting against each other on some of the seats and so was the Samta Party.

== Results ==
Party	Votes	%	Seats
Rashtriya Janata Dal	10,500,361	28.34	124
Bharatiya Janata Party	5,424,687	14.64	67
Samata Party	3,205,746	8.65	34
Indian National Congress	4,096,467	11.06	23
Janata Dal (United)	2,396,677	6.47	21
Jharkhand Mukti Morcha	1,306,152	3.53	12
Communist Party of India (Marxist-Leninist) Liberation	925,253	2.50	6
Bahujan Samaj Party	701,936	1.89	5
Communist Party of India	1,334,386	3.60	5
Communist Party of India (Marxist)	338,198	0.91	2
United Goans Democratic Party	96,297	0.26	2
Kosal Party	132,835	0.36	2
Marxist Co-ordination Committee	104,450	0.28	1
Others	2,274,134	6.14	0
Independent (politician)	4,211,341	11.37	20
Total	37,048,920	100.00	324
Valid votes	37,048,920	98.60	
Invalid/blank votes	527,141	1.40	
Total votes	37,576,061	100.00	
Registered voters/turnout	60,091,029	62.53	
Source: ECI

== Results by Constituency ==
Constituency		%	Winner				Runner-up				Margin	
Constituency		%	Candidate	Party	Votes	%	Candidate	Party	Votes	%	Votes	%
1	Dhanaha	55.82	Rajesh Singh	BSP	15,034	22.35	Arun Ku. Tiwari	IND	11,287	16.78	3,747	5.57
2	Bagha (SC)	55.08	Purnamasi Ram	RJD	58,668	49.23	Kailash Baitha	IND	39,191	32.88	19,477	16.35
3	Ramnagar	57.11	Chandra Mohan Ray	BJP	44,454	42.72	Mohamad Salauddin	NCP	25,332	24.34	19,122	18.38
4	Shikarpur (SC)	52.41	Bhagirathi Devi	BJP	35,377	37.02	Subodh Kumar	NCP	22,069	23.09	13,308	13.93
5	Sikta	61.51	Dilip Kr. Varma	BJP	50,592	48.64	Motiur Rahman	CPI(ML)	24,147	23.21	26,445	25.43
6	Lauria	57.39	Vishwa Mohan Sharma	INC	41,016	42.26	Ran Vijaya Shahi	RJD	25,520	26.29	15,496	15.97
7	Chanpatia	62.35	Krishna Kumar Mishra	BJP	22,617	21.89	Sharafuddin Shekh	SJP(R)	21,058	20.38	1,559	1.51
8	Bettiah	59.92	Renu Devi	BJP	44,897	32.61	Md. Shamim Akhtar	IND	34,056	24.73	10,841	7.88
9	Nautan	58.85	Baidyanath Prasad Mahto	SAP	39,584	39.02	Amar Yadav	IND	15,864	15.64	23,720	23.38
10	Raxaul	61.74	Ajay Kumar Singh	BJP	41,983	38.83	Sagir Ahmad	INC	29,032	26.85	12,951	11.98
11	Sugauli	65.69	Vijay Prasad Gupta	KSP	39,499	33.15	Ramashray Singh	CPI(M)	38,993	32.73	506	0.42
12	Motihari	63.66	Rama Devi	RJD	78,657	57.75	Pramod Kumar	BJP	44,090	32.37	34,567	25.38
13	Adapur	60.06	Virendra Prasad	IND	44,227	39.95	Shyam Bihari Prasad	RJD	43,960	39.71	267	0.24
14	Dhaka	67.19	Manoj Kumar Singh	RJD	59,948	43.45	Avaneesh Kumar Singh	BJP	53,851	39.03	6,097	4.42
15	Ghorasahan	59.97	Laxmi Na. Prasad Yadav	JD(U)	39,668	37.87	Lal Vavu Prasad	RJD	18,637	17.79	21,031	20.08
16	Madhuban	67.58	Sita Ram Singh	RJD	64,285	50.70	Rajesh Kumar Roshan	SAP	43,476	34.29	20,809	16.41
17	Pipra (SC)	58.16	Surendra Kumar Chandra	RJD	34,469	36.73	Krisnanandan Paswan	IND	23,702	25.26	10,767	11.47
18	Kesariya	57.69	Obaidullah	SAP	46,743	42.72	Yamuna Yadav	KSP	17,424	15.92	29,319	26.80
19	Harsidhi	71.18	Maheshwar Singh	SAP	60,363	48.93	Awadhesh Pd. Kush.	RJD	47,645	38.62	12,718	10.31
20	Gobindganj	57.55	Rajan Tiwari	IND	31,702	29.18	Bhupendra Nath Dubey	SAP	28,439	26.18	3,263	3.00
21	Kateya	62.38	Kiran Devi	RJD	50,704	40.88	Man Deo Tiwari	BJP	33,548	27.05	17,156	13.83
22	Bhore (SC)	58.36	Acharya Vishwanath Baitha	BJP	59,230	50.91	Alagu Ram	RJD	26,857	23.08	32,373	27.83
23	Mirganj	57.91	Prabhu Dayal Singh	SAP	49,084	45.22	Abdul Samad	IND	24,596	22.66	24,488	22.56
24	Gopalganj	53.15	Anirudh Pd. Alias Sadhu Yadav	RJD	30,248	28.61	Subash Singh	BPSP	19,372	18.32	10,876	10.29
25	Barauli	62.04	Ram Pravesh Rai	BJP	52,085	45.07	Md. Nematullah	RJD	42,360	36.65	9,725	8.42
26	Baikunthpur	63.92	Manjeet Kumar Singh	SAP	60,891	48.35	Lal Babu Pd. Yadav	RJD	40,963	32.53	19,928	15.82
27	Basantpur	74.78	Satyadeo Pd. Singh	BJP	67,052	49.15	Manik Chand Roy	RJD	65,992	48.37	1,060	0.78
28	Goreakothi	70.12	Indradeo Prasad	RJD	42,324	36.44	Ajit Kumar Singh	IND	22,198	19.11	20,126	17.33
29	Siwan	75.19	Awadh Bihari Chaudhary	RJD	1,07,933	79.04	Wasi Ahmad	BJP	18,696	13.69	89,237	65.35
30	Mairwa (SC)	60.31	Satyadeo Ram	CPI(ML)	32,996	35.75	Gorakh Ram	INC	26,487	28.70	6,509	7.05
31	Darauli	66.73	Sheo Shankar Yadav	RJD	46,047	40.39	Amarnath Yadav	CPI(ML)	33,990	29.82	12,057	10.57
32	Ziradei	76.87	M. Azazul Haque	RJD	75,920	63.20	Shyam Bahadur Singh	SAP	31,000	25.81	44,920	37.39
33	Maharajganj	71.73	Umashankar Singh	SAP	58,671	50.97	Damodar Singh	IND	22,715	19.73	35,956	31.24
34	Raghunathpur	59.48	Vijay Shankar Dubey	INC	34,503	32.00	Bikram Kunwar	RJD	32,064	29.74	2,439	2.26
35	Manjhi	65.55	Ravindra Nath Mishra	IND	33,725	31.33	Gautam Singh	SAP	27,583	25.62	6,142	5.71
36	Baniapur	69.41	Manoranjan Singh	IND	37,926	35.33	Ram Bahadur Rai	RJD	35,837	33.38	2,089	1.95
37	Masrakh	58.11	Tarkeshwar Singh	RJD	47,301	50.57	Kedar Nath Singh	SAP	36,842	39.39	10,459	11.18
38	Taraiya	70.05	Ram Das Ray	RJD	40,680	36.93	Janak Singh	BJP	40,415	36.69	265	0.24
39	Marhaura	77.12	Yadubanshi Rai	RJD	68,463	56.23	Surendra Sharma	SAP	45,573	37.43	22,890	18.80
40	Jalalpur	65.50	Janardan Singh Sigriwal	IND	27,408	23.58	Ramjan Ali	SJP(R)	25,800	22.19	1,608	1.39
41	Chapra	73.58	Udit Rai	RJD	76,749	52.89	Rambabu Ray	BJP	54,030	37.23	22,719	15.66
42	Garkha (SC)	69.18	Muneshwar Chaudhary	RJD	52,530	46.69	Amrit Chaudhary	SAP	45,114	40.10	7,416	6.59
43	Parsa	74.99	Chandrika Rai	RJD	74,581	57.99	Ram Nath Bidhyarthi	INC	29,071	22.60	45,510	35.39
44	Sonepur	85.76	Vinay Kumar Singh	BJP	72,502	48.86	Prof. Ramanuj Prasad	RJD	70,212	47.32	2,290	1.54
45	Hajipur	72.68	Nityanand Rai	BJP	95,598	66.43	Rajendra Rai	RJD	42,762	29.72	52,836	36.71
46	Raghopur	74.52	Laloo Prasad	RJD	70,134	51.00	Vishundeo Rai	JD(U)	41,006	29.82	29,128	21.18
47	Mahnar	76.37	Rama Kishore Singh	JD(U)	84,893	64.13	Munshilal Rai	RJD	44,344	33.50	40,549	30.63
48	Jandaha	77.27	Upendra Pd. Singh	SAP	46,042	33.47	Achida Nand Singh	IND	40,681	29.57	5,361	3.90
49	Patepur (SC)	68.77	Prema Chaudhary	RJD	60,572	51.65	Mahendra Baitha	JD(U)	48,457	41.32	12,115	10.33
50	Mahua (SC)	71.24	Dasai Chowdhary	RJD	60,478	50.95	Munshi Lal Paswan	JD(U)	51,408	43.31	9,070	7.64
51	Lalganj	76.49	Vijay Shukal	IND	82,406	62.15	Raj Kumar Sah	RJD	29,701	22.40	52,705	39.75
52	Vaishali	70.71	Veena Shahi	INC	52,708	41.38	Vrishin Patel	RJD	40,680	31.93	12,028	9.45
53	Paru	66.75	Mithilesh Pd. Yadav	RJD	55,823	46.10	Anunay Kumar Singh	INC	30,523	25.21	25,300	20.89
54	Sahebganj	68.60	Ram Vichar Rai	RJD	76,235	64.26	Nagendra Prasad Singh	BPSP	35,872	30.24	40,363	34.02
55	Baruraj	64.71	Shashi Kumar Rai	JD(U)	48,850	42.75	Braj Kishore Singh	RJD	33,817	29.59	15,033	13.16
56	Kanti	65.96	Gulam Jilani Warasi	RJD	35,023	32.78	Ajit Kumar	AJBP	23,979	22.44	11,044	10.34
57	Kurhani	69.02	Basawan Prasad Bhagat	RJD	48,343	39.90	Brajesh Kumar	BPSP	32,795	27.07	15,548	12.83
58	Sakra (SC)	69.15	Sital Ram	RJD	49,391	43.68	Vilat Paswan	JD(U)	42,120	37.25	7,271	6.43
59	Muzaffarpur	65.62	Vijendra Chaudhary	RJD	86,873	56.22	Suresh Kumar Sharma	BJP	60,040	38.85	26,833	17.37
60	Bochaha (SC)	67.57	Ramai Ram	RJD	77,031	62.93	Musafir Paswan	JD(U)	22,863	18.68	54,168	44.25
61	Gaighatti	73.59	Veerendra Kumar Singh	JD(U)	47,020	40.41	Devendra Pd. Yadav	RJD	42,024	36.11	4,996	4.30
62	Aurai	66.50	Ganesh Prasad Yadav	JD(U)	47,268	45.22	Arjun Roy	RJD	34,381	32.89	12,887	12.33
63	Minapur	71.34	Dinesh Prasad	IND	32,586	28.45	Hind Kesri Yadav	RJD	29,634	25.87	2,952	2.58
64	Runisaidpur	67.14	Bhola Rai	RJD	65,501	49.45	Anil Kumar Singh	JD(U)	34,239	25.85	31,262	23.60
65	Belsand	61.53	Ram Swarth Rai	RJD	53,184	53.57	Rana Randhir Singh Chauhan	SAP	21,783	21.94	31,401	31.63
66	Sheohar	54.79	Sataya Nr. Prasad	RJD	43,664	41.75	Ajit Kumar Jha	SAP	38,645	36.95	5,019	4.80
67	Sitamarhi	67.85	Shahid Ali Khan	RJD	58,740	39.21	Harishankar Prasad	BJP	58,705	39.19	35	0.02
68	Bathnaha	65.72	Suryadeo Rai	RJD	63,218	49.01	Raj Kishore Singh Kushwaha	SAP	48,615	37.69	14,603	11.32
69	Majorganj (SC)	69.21	Gauri Shankar Nagdansh	BJP	67,524	58.75	Dinkar Ram	RJD	36,552	31.80	30,972	26.95
70	Sonbarsa	71.15	Dr. Ramchandra Purve	RJD	46,590	35.07	Md. Hira Khan	INC	28,396	21.38	18,194	13.69
71	Sursand	64.09	Jainandan Pd. Yadav	JD(U)	54,222	47.17	Nagendra Prasad Yadav	RJD	36,834	32.05	17,388	15.12
72	Pupri	62.37	Sita Ram Yadav	RJD	55,907	44.21	Habib. A. Birari	JD(U)	54,828	43.35	1,079	0.86
73	Benipatti	59.75	Ramashish Yadav	JD(U)	37,476	34.58	Shaligram Yadav	RJD	27,781	25.63	9,695	8.95
74	Bisfi	64.50	Dr. Shakil Ahmad	INC	41,889	34.06	Abdul Hai	RJD	29,290	23.81	12,599	10.25
75	Harlakhi	61.80	Sitaram Yadav	RJD	34,955	32.41	Ram Naresh Pandey	CPI	34,421	31.91	534	0.50
76	Khajauli (SC)	60.63	Ram Lakhan Ram "Raman"	RJD	37,206	34.34	Ramprit Paswan	BJP	35,490	32.75	1,716	1.59
77	Babubarhi	67.62	Deo Narayan Yadav	RJD	42,503	38.79	Brahmadeo Narain Singh	SAP	41,222	37.62	1,281	1.17
78	Madhubani	66.55	Ramdeo Mahto	BJP	50,471	39.01	Raj Kumar Mahseth	RJD	32,395	25.04	18,076	13.97
79	Pandaul	68.66	Naiyar Azam	RJD	57,674	44.40	Devendra Prasad Singh	BPSP	35,576	27.39	22,098	17.01
80	Jhanjharpur	58.05	Jagdish Narayan Chaudhary	RJD	34,313	33.71	Nitish Mishra	BJC(R)	24,264	23.84	10,049	9.87
81	Phulparas	62.19	Ram Kumar Yadav	JD(U)	35,984	33.09	Deo Nath Yadav	SP	29,976	27.57	6,008	5.52
82	Laukaha	65.20	Hari Pd. Sah	SAP	39,120	36.58	Chitranjan Prasad Yadav	RJD	24,080	22.52	15,040	14.06
83	Madhepur	66.34	Jagat Nr. Singh	RJD	47,513	39.70	Sita Ram Singh	BPSP	27,431	22.92	20,082	16.78
84	Manigachhi	69.81	Lalit Kr. Yadav	RJD	56,310	46.99	Dr. Madan Mohan Jha	INC	32,213	26.88	24,097	20.11
85	Bahera	70.99	Abdul Bari Siddiqui	RJD	60,395	50.19	Harish Chandra Jha	BJP	29,682	24.67	30,713	25.52
86	Ghanshyampur	74.75	Mahavir Prasad	RJD	79,472	53.61	Izhar Ahmad	JD(U)	63,031	42.52	16,441	11.09
87	Baheri	74.38	Ramanand Singh	JD(U)	52,648	36.60	Hare Krishna Yadav	RJD	43,644	30.34	9,004	6.26
88	Darbhanga Rural (SC)	72.49	Pitambar Paswan	RJD	59,305	49.95	Suneeti Ranjan Das	JD(U)	37,833	31.86	21,472	18.09
89	Darbhanga	67.11	Sultan Ahmad	RJD	40,462	31.61	Shiv Nath Verma	BJP	39,667	30.99	795	0.62
90	Keoti	68.93	Ghulam Sarwar	RJD	59,188	43.26	Ashok Kumar Yadav	BJP	54,606	39.91	4,582	3.35
91	Jale	69.79	Vijay Kumar Mishra	BJP	61,897	49.13	Ram Niwas Prasad	RJD	31,280	24.83	30,617	24.30
92	Hayaghat	66.47	Umadhar Pd. Singh	IND	32,214	30.39	Hari Nandan Yadav	RJD	24,351	22.97	7,863	7.42
93	Kalyanpur	65.46	Ashwamegh Devi	SAP	48,404	39.01	Alok Kumar Mehta	RJD	43,929	35.40	4,475	3.61
94	Warisnagar (SC)	60.04	Ram Sewak Hazari	JD(U)	42,250	42.35	Bhikhar Baitha	RJD	28,640	28.71	13,610	13.64
95	Samastipur	65.84	Ram Nath Thakur	JD(U)	62,641	45.03	Ashok Singh	RJD	51,359	36.92	11,282	8.11
96	Sarairanjan	62.81	Ramashraya Sahni	RJD	56,230	42.45	Chandra Kant Chaudhary	BJP	50,498	38.12	5,732	4.33
97	Mohiuddin Nagar	73.96	Ram Chandra Rai	RJD	53,697	34.40	Ajai Kumar Bulganin	JD(U)	48,933	31.35	4,764	3.05
98	Dalsinghsarai	62.69	Ram Padarath Mahto	RJD	47,580	37.96	Vijaywant Kumar Chaudhary	JD(U)	28,315	22.59	19,265	15.37
99	Bibhutpur	63.01	Ramdeo Verma	CPI(M)	55,174	41.60	Chandrabali Thakur	INC	38,707	29.18	16,467	12.42
100	Rosera (SC)	63.31	Ashok Kumar	SAP	53,650	46.89	Gajendra Pd. Singh	RJD	52,330	45.74	1,320	1.15
101	Singhia	60.67	Dr. Ashok Kumar	INC	37,346	34.04	Jagadish Paswan	JD(U)	36,607	33.37	739	0.67
102	Hasanpur	62.62	Gajendra Prasad Himansu	JD(U)	51,273	47.27	Rajendra Yadav	RJD	48,145	44.38	3,128	2.89
103	Balia	67.26	Shrinarayan Yadav	RJD	46,889	42.68	Md. Tanweer Hasan	JD(U)	46,585	42.40	304	0.28
104	Matihani	63.30	Rajendra Rajan	CPI	32,962	30.62	Pramod Kumar Sharma	INC	26,246	24.38	6,716	6.24
105	Begusarai	65.93	Bhola Pd. Singh	BJP	51,502	41.86	Kamli Mahto	CPI	43,152	35.08	8,350	6.78
106	Barauni	62.38	Rajendra Pd. Singh	CPI	45,772	38.02	Ram Lakhan Singh	BJP	39,487	32.80	6,285	5.22
107	Bachwara	63.36	Uttam Kumar Yadav	RJD	29,381	27.08	Awdhesh Rai	CPI	28,923	26.66	458	0.42
108	Cheria Bariarpur	67.90	Ashok Kumar	RJD	63,830	56.61	Anil Chaudhary	JD(U)	28,676	25.43	35,154	31.18
109	Bakhri (SC)	63.08	Ramanand Ram	RJD	33,572	33.46	Ram Vinod Paswan	CPI	32,989	32.88	583	0.58
110	Raghopur	66.27	Uday Prasad Goet	RJD	49,374	40.28	Lakhan Thakur	JD(U)	36,800	30.02	12,574	10.26
111	Kishunpur	66.95	Yaduwansh Kumar Yadav	RJD	38,031	34.34	Vijay Kumar Gupta	INC	31,450	28.40	6,581	5.94
112	Supaul	63.01	Bijendra Pd. Yadav	JD(U)	34,321	28.55	Vinayak Prasad Yadav	RJD	31,873	26.51	2,448	2.04
113	Tribeniganj	69.13	Anup Lal Yadav	RJD	30,015	29.09	Bishwa Mohan Kumar	INC	24,173	23.43	5,842	5.66
114	Chhatapur (SC)	64.19	Gita Devi	RJD	34,143	36.21	Vishwa Mohan Bharti	JD(U)	31,187	33.08	2,956	3.13
115	Kumarkhand (SC)	70.08	Bhupendra Rishideo	RJD	65,553	61.04	Amit Kumar Bharti	JD(U)	33,098	30.82	32,455	30.22
116	Singheshwar	63.94	Vijay Kumar Singh	RJD	40,228	38.66	Upendra Narayan Yadav	JD(U)	20,968	20.15	19,260	18.51
117	Saharsa	66.20	Shankar Prasad Tekriwal	RJD	63,858	44.64	Lovely Anand	BPSP	49,781	34.80	14,077	9.84
118	Mahishi	67.92	Abdul Ghafoor	RJD	49,431	36.28	Surendra Yadav	JD(U)	31,607	23.20	17,824	13.08
119	Simri-Bakhtiarpur	67.72	Ch. Md. Mahboob Ali Kaisar	INC	38,781	32.55	Zafar Alam	RJD	31,822	26.71	6,959	5.84
120	Madhepura	72.23	Rajendra Prasad Yadav	RJD	77,282	58.68	Kapildeb Mandal	JD(U)	41,924	31.83	35,358	26.85
121	Sonbarsa	63.56	Ashok Kumar Singh	RJD	37,425	30.53	Kishor Kumar Singh	IND	33,191	27.08	4,234	3.45
122	Kishanganj	67.56	Prof. Ravindra Charan Yadav	RJD	56,197	55.07	Md. Abdul Satar	JD(U)	25,214	24.71	30,983	30.36
123	Alamnagar	64.00	Narendra Nr. Yadav	JD(U)	35,690	33.94	Rajendra Singh	RJD	33,977	32.31	1,713	1.63
124	Rupauli	65.95	Bima Bharti	IND	20,224	18.72	Md. Alimuddin	SP	13,916	12.88	6,308	5.84
125	Dhamdaha	66.59	Lesha Devi	SAP	39,432	31.05	Dilip Kumar Yadav	SP	25,411	20.01	14,021	11.04
126	Banmankhi (SC)	59.54	Deo Narayan Rajak	BJP	44,761	41.65	Manorama Devi	RJD	32,816	30.54	11,945	11.11
127	Raniganj (SC)	60.60	Yamuna Prasad Ram	RJD	52,035	45.08	Ramji Das Rishideo	BJP	30,365	26.31	21,670	18.77
128	Narpatganj	61.32	Janardan Yadav	BJP	33,156	27.51	Dayanand Yadav	RJD	23,436	19.45	9,720	8.06
129	Forbesganj	67.82	Zakir Hussain Khan	BSP	31,982	25.13	Laxmi Narayan Mehta	IND	25,434	19.99	6,548	5.14
130	Araria	69.33	Bijay Kumar Mandal	IND	21,698	17.62	Moidur Rahman	INC	20,981	17.04	717	0.58
131	Sikti	70.51	Anandi Prasad Yadav	BJP	54,981	37.28	Md. Azim Uddin	IND	40,798	27.66	14,183	9.62
132	Jokihat	66.09	Sarfraz	RJD	44,274	39.54	Manzer Alam	JD(U)	25,775	23.02	18,499	16.52
133	Bahadurganj	62.90	Zahidur Rahman	INC	43,222	40.09	Awadh Bihari Singh	BJP	30,575	28.36	12,647	11.73
134	Thakurganj	64.25	Dr. Md. Jawaid	INC	40,875	31.77	Tarachand Dhanuka	IND	34,165	26.56	6,710	5.21
135	Kishanganj	59.48	Taslim Uddin	RJD	37,172	31.04	Rajeshwar Baid	BJP	23,180	19.36	13,992	11.68
136	Amour	73.86	Abdul Jalil Mastan	INC	58,399	43.39	Saba Zafar	RJD	42,565	31.63	15,834	11.76
137	Baisi	66.42	Abdus Subhan	RJD	35,185	32.86	Israil Azad	JD(U)	21,214	19.81	13,971	13.05
138	Kasba	66.70	Pradip Kr. Das	BJP	32,222	24.54	Md. Afaque Alam	IND	26,553	20.22	5,669	4.32
139	Purnea	57.59	Raj Kishore Kesri	BJP	30,776	26.02	Ramcharitra Yadav	SP	18,856	15.94	11,920	10.08
140	Korha (SC)	65.20	Mahesh Paswan	BJP	45,513	41.36	Sunita Devi	INC	31,377	28.52	14,136	12.84
141	Barari	65.35	Mansoor Alam	RJD	37,287	35.87	Muhammad Shakur	NCP	15,671	15.07	21,616	20.80
142	Katihar	55.16	Ram Prakash Mahto	RJD	69,030	57.76	Jagbandhu Adhikari	BJP	40,659	34.02	28,371	23.74
143	Kadwa	64.80	Himraj Singh	IND	34,352	30.91	Abdul Jalil	RJD	26,589	23.93	7,763	6.98
144	Barsoi	65.48	Mahboob Alam	CPI(ML)	62,644	51.83	Dulal Chandra Goswami	BJP	36,085	29.86	26,559	21.97
145	Pranpur	65.79	Binod Kumar Singh	BJP	39,161	36.85	Mahendra Narayan Yadav	RJD	35,810	33.69	3,351	3.16
146	Manihari	62.73	Vishwanath Singh	JD(U)	28,881	32.33	Saghir Ahmad	NCP	22,005	24.63	6,876	7.70
147	Rajmahal	62.66	Arun Mandal	BJP	36,623	29.92	Najrul Islam	JMM	24,761	20.23	11,862	9.69
148	Borio (ST)	56.12	Lobin Hembrom	JMM	36,170	38.74	Tala Marandi	INC	29,491	31.59	6,679	7.15
149	Barhait (ST)	69.47	Hemlal Murmu	JMM	66,599	67.56	Lourens Hansda	INC	28,473	28.89	38,126	38.67
150	Litipara (ST)	55.93	Sushila Hansda	JMM	35,391	46.68	Stephan Soren	INC	24,881	32.82	10,510	13.86
151	Pakaur	63.30	Alamgir Alam	INC	49,218	43.95	Veni Prasad Gupta	BJP	35,033	31.28	14,185	12.67
152	Maheshpur (ST)	57.01	Devidhan Besra	BJP	21,145	25.39	Sufal Marandi	JMM	17,050	20.48	4,095	4.91
153	Sikaripara (ST)	54.09	Nalin Soren	JMM	39,259	47.46	Chhoto Murmu	BJP	23,126	27.95	16,133	19.51
154	Nala	54.13	Bisheswar Khan	CPI	20,324	23.30	Rabindra Nath Mahato	JMM	19,690	22.57	634	0.73
155	Jamtara	64.06	Furkan Ansari	INC	42,002	39.49	Bishnu Prasad Bhaiya	BJP	33,738	31.72	8,264	7.77
156	Sarath	68.56	Shashank Shekhar Bhokta	JMM	60,482	51.12	Uday Shankar Singh	BJP	47,016	39.74	13,466	11.38
157	Madhupur	61.46	Hussain Ansari	JMM	35,811	30.57	Vishakha Singh	BJP	30,579	26.10	5,232	4.47
158	Deoghar (SC)	53.11	Suresh Paswan	RJD	48,216	41.07	Shankar Paswan	JD(U)	27,398	23.34	20,818	17.73
159	Jarmundi	67.34	Dvendera Kuwar	BJP	24,082	23.44	Harinarayan Roy	BSP	19,009	18.50	5,073	4.94
160	Dumka (ST)	56.27	Stephen Marandi	JMM	43,010	45.44	Satish Soren	BJP	31,788	33.59	11,222	11.85
161	Jama (ST)	57.71	Durga Soren	JMM	41,165	48.95	Rabindra Marandi	BJP	25,179	29.94	15,986	19.01
162	Poreyahat	66.78	Pradeep Yadav	BJP	54,287	43.93	Prasant Mandal	JMM	35,874	29.03	18,413	14.90
163	Godda	65.61	Sanjay Prasad Yadav	RJD	30,774	23.30	Dukh Mochan Choudhary	BJP	23,663	17.92	7,111	5.38
164	Mahagama	60.94	Ashok Kumar	BJP	32,025	25.98	Ataur Rahman Siddique	RJD	21,519	17.46	10,506	8.52
165	Pirpainti	62.49	Shobhakant Mandal	RJD	43,329	34.48	Ambika Prasad	CPI	31,928	25.41	11,401	9.07
166	Colgong	61.83	Sadanand Singh	INC	63,579	46.10	Mahesh Prasad Mandal	RJD	37,944	27.52	25,635	18.58
167	Nathnagar	61.66	Sudha Shrivastava	SAP	43,608	35.64	Lutfur Rehman	RJD	34,763	28.41	8,845	7.23
168	Bhagalpur	57.36	Ashwini Kumar Chouvey	BJP	64,364	53.71	Arun Kumar	RJD	41,487	34.62	22,877	19.09
169	Gopalpur	69.73	Rabindra Kr. Rana	RJD	67,813	50.82	Narendar Kr. Niraj	SAP	49,848	37.36	17,965	13.46
170	Bihpur	63.75	Shailesh Kumar	RJD	39,637	38.25	Dr. Bimla Roy	BJP	22,159	21.38	17,478	16.87
171	Sultanganj (SC)	59.93	Ganesh Paswan	SAP	70,771	53.50	Phanindra Choudhary	RJD	39,252	29.67	31,519	23.83
172	Amarpur	63.99	Surendra Prasad Singh	RJD	49,144	42.11	Bedanand Singh	SAP	39,934	34.22	9,210	7.89
173	Dhuraiya (SC)	63.55	Bhudeo Choudhary	SAP	57,632	49.29	Ramrup Harijan	RJD	28,840	24.66	28,792	24.63
174	Banka	67.26	Ram Narayan Mandal	BJP	58,648	53.57	Iqbal Hussain Ansarai	RJD	38,426	35.10	20,222	18.47
175	Belhar	63.30	Ramdeo Yadav	RJD	45,892	47.14	Deosharan Singh	SAP	30,781	31.62	15,111	15.52
176	Katoria	62.81	Giridhari Yadav	RJD	51,558	44.73	Kaleshwar Yadav	BJP	22,301	19.35	29,257	25.38
177	Chakai	60.39	Narendra Singh	IND	58,345	53.17	Falguni Prasad Yadav	BJP	27,874	25.40	30,471	27.77
178	Jhajha	55.10	Damodar Rawat	SAP	27,480	29.82	Dr. Ravindra Yadav	RJD	25,835	28.03	1,645	1.79
179	Tarapur	68.88	Shakuni Choudhary	RJD	68,864	59.34	Rajiv Kumar Singh	SAP	39,247	33.82	29,617	25.52
180	Kharagpur	71.01	Jai Prakash N. Yadav	RJD	82,104	58.54	Anita Devi	JD(U)	30,032	21.41	52,072	37.13
181	Parbatta	75.79	Rakesh Kr.	RJD	48,202	34.69	Ramanand Prasad Singh	IND	35,425	25.49	12,777	9.20
182	Chautham	70.30	Panna Lal Singh 'Patel'	SAP	40,168	32.58	Vidya Sagar Nishad	RJD	37,087	30.08	3,081	2.50
183	Khagaria	66.26	Yogendra Singh	CPI(M)	37,567	32.35	Chandramukhi Devi	BJP	34,954	30.10	2,613	2.25
184	Alauli (SC)	67.80	Pashupati Kumar Paras	JD(U)	52,740	51.19	Ram Briksh Sada	RJD	48,054	46.65	4,686	4.54
185	Monghyr	63.62	Monazir Hassan	RJD	50,150	39.17	Prof. Asfar Samsi	BJP	41,680	32.55	8,470	6.62
186	Jamalpur	59.20	Upendra Prasad Verma	RJD	41,906	37.41	Shailesh Kumar	IND	40,535	36.19	1,371	1.22
187	Surajgarha	68.71	Prahlad Yadav	RJD	54,410	41.05	Bhagwat Pd. Mehta	BJP	27,546	20.78	26,864	20.27
188	Jamui	61.51	Narendra Singh	JD(U)	44,656	34.91	Umashankar Bhagat	IND	38,277	29.92	6,379	4.99
189	Sikandra (SC)	56.39	Prayaag Choudhary	KSP	51,244	46.14	Janakdeo Ram	JD(U)	25,401	22.87	25,843	23.27
190	Lakhisarai	60.99	Krishna Chandra Pd. Singh	BJP	46,372	37.97	Phulena Singh	RJD	34,192	28.00	12,180	9.97
191	Sheikhpura	70.69	Sanjay Kumar Singh	INC	87,650	67.10	Vijay Kumar Yadav	RJD	27,113	20.76	60,537	46.34
192	Barbigha (SC)	59.78	Ashok Chaudhary	INC	63,697	61.95	Manohar Paswan	SAP	25,170	24.48	38,527	37.47
193	Asthawan	70.55	Raghunath Prasad Sharma	IND	40,175	32.07	Satish Kumar	NCP	26,761	21.36	13,414	10.71
194	Bihar	72.80	Syed Naushadunnabi	RJD	64,981	35.85	Dr. Sunil Kumar	IND	40,999	22.62	23,982	13.23
195	Rajgir (SC)	74.12	Satyadeo Narayan Arya	BJP	60,068	43.00	Chandradeo Prasad Himanshu	RJD	46,097	33.00	13,971	10.00
196	Nalanda	76.66	Shrawan Kumar	SAP	55,940	39.45	Ram Naresh Singh	IND	41,498	29.26	14,442	10.19
197	Islampur	78.45	Ramswaroop Prasad	SAP	76,015	47.58	Naresh Yadav	RJD	27,705	17.34	48,310	30.24
198	Hilsa	78.36	Ramcharitra Prasad Singh	SAP	55,218	37.51	Baiju Prasad	RJD	44,369	30.14	10,849	7.37
199	Chandi	72.13	Harinarain Singh	SAP	57,749	49.64	Usha Sinha	RJD	39,308	33.79	18,441	15.85
200	Harnaut	70.62	Vishvamohan Choudhary	SAP	47,530	40.29	Sunil Kumar	RJD	39,773	33.71	7,757	6.58
201	Mokameh	76.70	Suraj Singh	IND	1,02,499	68.61	Dilip Kumar Singh	RJD	43,028	28.80	59,471	39.81
202	Barh	64.95	Bhunewashwar Prasad	SAP	73,404	59.11	Vijay Krishna	RJD	46,810	37.70	26,594	21.41
203	Bakhtiarpur	61.22	Vinod Yadav	BJP	32,438	27.76	Brij Nandan Yadav	RJD	31,570	27.02	868	0.74
204	Fatwa (SC)	59.54	Dinesh Choudhary	RJD	46,850	40.85	Puneet Roy	JD(U)	39,897	34.79	6,953	6.06
205	Masaurhi	76.23	Dharmendra Prasad	RJD	70,370	46.88	Punam Devi	SAP	48,571	32.36	21,799	14.52
206	Patna West	42.09	Navin Kishor Pd. Sinha	BJP	84,096	54.93	Shiv Nath Yadav	RJD	47,239	30.86	36,857	24.07
207	Patna Central	47.36	Sushil Kumar Modi	BJP	85,832	61.46	Kanchanwala	RJD	19,763	14.15	66,069	47.31
208	Patna East	54.33	Nand Kishor Yadav	BJP	65,377	54.13	Gyanedra Kumar Yadav	RJD	33,885	28.06	31,492	26.07
209	Dinapur	57.56	Lalu Prasad	RJD	64,085	56.51	Rama Nand Yadav	BJP	46,530	41.03	17,555	15.48
210	Maner	60.07	Bhai Birendra	SAP	52,491	46.83	Shrikant Nirala	RJD	47,856	42.70	4,635	4.13
211	Phulwari (SC)	63.32	Shyam Rajak	RJD	70,323	47.23	Sanjeev Prasad Tony	INC	38,666	25.97	31,657	21.26
212	Bikram	74.00	Ram Janam Sharma	BJP	72,478	50.78	Chadrama Singh Yadav	RJD	47,041	32.96	25,437	17.82
213	Paliganj	67.72	Dinanath Singh	RJD	64,376	44.48	Janardan Sharma	BJP	28,039	19.37	36,337	25.11
214	Sandesh	65.34	Vijayendra Kumar Singh Yadav	RJD	47,393	41.52	Sonadhari Singh	SAP	32,356	28.35	15,037	13.17
215	Barhara	60.59	Raghwendra Pratap Singh	RJD	47,867	41.76	Bhai Brahmeshwar	SAP	41,284	36.01	6,583	5.75
216	Arrah	58.84	Amrendra Pratap Singh	BJP	48,848	43.16	Abdul Malick	RJD	33,395	29.50	15,453	13.66
217	Shahpur	60.50	Shivanad Tiwari	RJD	60,807	54.78	Dharm Pal Singh	SAP	39,175	35.29	21,632	19.49
218	Brahmpur	59.04	Ajit Chaudhary	RJD	30,236	27.44	Dhruv Tiwari	BJP	25,368	23.02	4,868	4.42
219	Buxar	59.68	Sukhada Pandey	BJP	27,151	28.46	Manju Prakash	CPI(M)	25,478	26.70	1,673	1.76
220	Rajpur (SC)	59.92	Chhedi Lal Ram	BSP	21,604	24.09	Kamakhya Narayan	RJD	19,989	22.29	1,615	1.80
221	Dumraon	61.41	Dadan Singh	IND	29,900	27.91	Ram Bihari Singh	SAP	22,029	20.57	7,871	7.34
222	Jagdishpur	59.44	Sribhagwan Singh	SAP	31,076	29.26	Harinarayan Singh	RJD	20,846	19.63	10,230	9.63
223	Piro	65.91	Narendra Kumar Pande	SAP	43,160	38.42	Kashinath Singh	RJD	39,500	35.16	3,660	3.26
224	Sahar (SC)	53.00	Ram Naresh Ram	CPI(ML)	43,290	46.73	Shankuntala Devi	BJP	22,770	24.58	20,520	22.15
225	Karakat	61.39	Arun Singh	CPI(ML)	39,254	33.12	Tulsi Singh	RJD	30,466	25.70	8,788	7.42
226	Bikramganj	62.55	Akhlaque Ahmad	SAP	55,162	44.31	Suryadeo Singh	RJD	22,848	18.36	32,314	25.95
227	Dinara	68.65	Ram Dhani Singh	JD(U)	53,489	42.16	Saroj Kumar Gupta	RJD	42,411	33.43	11,078	8.73
228	Ramgarh	61.83	Jagdanand Singh	RJD	48,840	46.72	Malti Devi	BSP	24,299	23.24	24,541	23.48
229	Mohania (SC)	57.17	Suresh Pasi	BSP	49,510	46.54	Ramkeshi Bharti	RJD	25,425	23.90	24,085	22.64
230	Bhabhua	61.53	Pramod Singh	RJD	33,195	26.05	Brij Kishore Bind	BSP	31,862	25.00	1,333	1.05
231	Chainpur	65.05	Mahabali Singh	BSP	27,077	25.34	Kishore Prasad	IND	21,975	20.57	5,102	4.77
232	Sasaram	54.97	Ashok Kumar	RJD	62,673	50.27	Jawahir Prasad	BJP	49,317	39.55	13,356	10.72
233	Chenari (SC)	61.48	Chhedi Paswan	RJD	40,738	33.27	Ram Bachan Paswan	BPSP	35,053	28.63	5,685	4.64
234	Nokha	64.33	Rameshwar Prasad	BJP	43,959	37.52	Anand Mohan Singh	RJD	30,665	26.17	13,294	11.35
235	Dehri	57.34	Md. Ilyas Husain	RJD	57,123	48.14	Gopal Narayan Singh	BJP	44,336	37.36	12,787	10.78
236	Nabinagar	63.84	Bheem Kumar	RJD	63,577	53.67	Raghuvansh Prasad Singh	IND	20,186	17.04	43,391	36.63
237	Deo (SC)	53.52	Suresh Paswan	RJD	40,660	44.07	Dil Keshwar Ram	INC	36,772	39.86	3,888	4.21
238	Aurangabad	57.25	Suresh Mehta	RJD	41,176	35.53	Ramadhar Singh	BJP	32,603	28.13	8,573	7.40
239	Rafiganj	57.01	Sushil Kumar Singh	SAP	32,918	34.27	Md. Nehaludin	RJD	22,724	23.66	10,194	10.61
240	Obra	61.67	Raja Ram Singh	CPI(ML)	37,650	32.48	Ram Naresh Singh	RJD	24,684	21.29	12,966	11.19
241	Goh	70.37	Deo Kumar Sharma	SAP	48,889	38.69	Ayodhya Singh	RJD	42,230	33.42	6,659	5.27
242	Arwal	61.04	Akhilesh Pd. Singh	RJD	29,298	26.27	Shah Chand	CPI(ML)	27,037	24.25	2,261	2.02
243	Kurtha	71.21	Shiv Bachan Yadav	RJD	50,888	39.17	Mundrika Singh Yadav	JD(U)	50,232	38.67	656	0.50
244	Makhdumpur	74.28	Vagi Kumar Verma	RJD	62,996	47.45	Ram Jatan Sinha	INC	55,626	41.90	7,370	5.55
245	Jahanabad	79.19	Muni Lal Yadav	RJD	72,628	48.87	Syed Asghar Hussain	SAP	53,687	36.12	18,941	12.75
246	Ghosi	80.77	Jagdish Sharma	IND	87,621	58.32	Mithilesh Yadav	CPI(ML)	60,097	40.00	27,524	18.32
247	Belaganj	70.98	Surendra Prasad Yadav	RJD	61,840	48.52	Krishan Kumar Singh	BJP	39,106	30.68	22,734	17.84
248	Konch	66.28	Mahesh Singh Yadav	RJD	63,001	52.64	Lalita Singh	BJP	36,992	30.91	26,009	21.73
249	Gaya Mufassil	69.31	Vinod Kumar Yadvendu	RJD	42,997	36.81	Awadhesh Kumar Singh	INC	37,236	31.87	5,761	4.94
250	Gaya Town	50.86	Prem Kumar	BJP	37,264	34.52	Masaud Manjar	CPI	33,205	30.76	4,059	3.76
251	Imamganj (SC)	55.68	Uday Narayan Chaudhary	SAP	40,769	46.09	Ramswaroop Paswan	RJD	28,268	31.96	12,501	14.13
252	Gurua	67.27	Shakeel Ahmad Kha	RJD	44,294	39.92	Amrendra Kumar Singh	BPSP	22,711	20.47	21,583	19.45
253	Bodh Gaya (SC)	59.89	Jitan Ram Manjhi	RJD	41,298	44.93	Krishna Kumar Choudhury	BJP	19,741	21.48	21,557	23.45
254	Barachatti (SC)	40.79	Bhagwatee Devi	RJD	26,694	39.27	Rajesh Kumar	SAP	16,030	23.58	10,664	15.69
255	Fatehpur (SC)	57.83	Shyamdeo Paswan	RJD	53,589	52.19	Tapeshwar Prasad	JD(U)	27,887	27.16	25,702	25.03
256	Atri	83.95	Rajendra Prasad Yadav	RJD	90,858	59.34	Birendra Singh	BPSP	58,824	38.42	32,034	20.92
257	Nawada	76.82	Rajballabh Prasad	RJD	1,06,614	57.51	Shatrughan Prasad Singh	IND	55,212	29.78	51,402	27.73
258	Rajauli (SC)	68.61	Rajaram Paswan	RJD	71,589	51.69	Banwari Ram	IND	40,247	29.06	31,342	22.63
259	Gobindpur	72.23	Gayatri Devi	RJD	45,930	34.64	Mohan Singh	SAP	37,011	27.91	8,919	6.73
260	Warsaliganj	79.59	Aruna Devi	IND	88,490	56.65	Manilal Prasad	RJD	43,777	28.02	44,713	28.63
261	Hisua	58.57	Aditya Singh	IND	27,497	27.63	Ganesh Shankar Vidyarthi	CPI(M)	23,577	23.69	3,920	3.94
262	Kodarma	64.34	Annapurna Devi	RJD	64,790	51.24	Ramesh Singh	BJP	42,828	33.87	21,962	17.37
263	Barhi	68.78	Manoj Kumar Yadav	INC	72,443	67.25	Mahaveer Sahu	BJP	19,983	18.55	52,460	48.70
264	Chatra (SC)	37.37	Satyanand Bhokata	BJP	34,177	45.18	Janardan Paswan	RJD	27,682	36.59	6,495	8.59
265	Simaria (SC)	26.55	Yogendra Nath Baitha	RJD	19,788	41.38	Upendra Nath Das	BJP	14,239	29.77	5,549	11.61
266	Barkagaon	47.92	Loknath Mahto	BJP	40,921	35.91	Puran Ram Shahu	CPI	30,342	26.63	10,579	9.28
267	Ramgarh	63.04	Sabir Ahmed Quaresi	CPI	42,599	34.78	Arjun Ram	JMM	30,013	24.50	12,586	10.28
268	Mandu	51.39	Teklal Mahto	JMM	49,022	40.03	Khiru Mahto	SAP	19,458	15.89	29,564	24.14
269	Hazaribagh	49.76	Deo Dayal	BJP	48,923	46.62	Lambodar Pathak	INC	35,011	33.36	13,912	13.26
270	Barkatha	60.79	Bhubneshwar Prasad Mehta	CPI	33,169	28.60	Khagendra Prasad	BJP	32,294	27.84	875	0.76
271	Dhanwar	68.13	Rabindra Kr. Ray	BJP	34,145	25.60	Raj Kumar Yadav	CPI(ML)	31,304	23.47	2,841	2.13
272	Bagodar	58.35	Mahendra Prasad Singh	CPI(ML)	32,182	27.47	Gautam Sagar Rana	JD(U)	25,529	21.79	6,653	5.68
273	Jamua (SC)	62.99	Baldeo Hazra	RJD	60,838	50.66	Sukar Ravidas	BJP	28,105	23.41	32,733	27.25
274	Gandey	67.77	Salkhan Soren	JMM	35,375	31.67	Laxaman Swarnkar	BJP	26,457	23.69	8,918	7.98
275	Giridih	49.19	Chandra Mohan Prasad	BJP	24,722	27.71	Nirbhay Kumar	RJD	23,697	26.56	1,025	1.15
276	Dumri	46.69	Lal Chand Mahto	JD(U)	28,087	35.35	Jagarnath Mahto	SAP	21,362	26.89	6,725	8.46
277	Gomia	53.20	Madhav Lal Singh	IND	38,404	40.13	Chhatru Ram Mahato	BJP	26,262	27.44	12,142	12.69
278	Bermo	56.20	Rajendra Prasad Singh	INC	46,783	37.71	Ramadhar Singh	BJP	27,494	22.16	19,289	15.55
279	Bokaro	56.63	Samaresh Singh	IND	97,712	48.66	Ashok Choudhary	SAP	33,779	16.82	63,933	31.84
280	Tundi	59.53	Saba Ahmad	RJD	25,079	24.34	Mathura Pd. Mahato	JMM	24,925	24.19	154	0.15
281	Baghmara	60.02	Jaleshwar Mahato	SAP	51,391	42.56	Om Prakash Lal	INC	47,438	39.29	3,953	3.27
282	Sindri	62.07	Fulchand Mandal	BJP	42,604	33.51	Anand Mahato	MCO	37,861	29.78	4,743	3.73
283	Nirsa	58.14	Gurudas Chaterjee	MCO	37,585	30.40	Subrat Sengupta	AIFB	36,804	29.76	781	0.64
284	Dhanbad	52.94	Pashupati Nath Singh	BJP	74,331	48.82	Prasadi Sao	RJD	32,266	21.19	42,065	27.63
285	Jharia	55.78	Bacha Singh	SAP	56,401	42.20	Abdul Qaum Ansari	INC	28,362	21.22	28,039	20.98
286	Chandankiyari (SC)	54.32	Haru Rajwar	JMM	37,431	42.64	Satish Chandra Rajak	IND	17,721	20.19	19,710	22.45
287	Baharagora	69.30	Dinesh Kumar Sarangi	BJP	30,186	27.24	Bidyut Mahato	JMM	28,885	26.06	1,301	1.18
288	Ghatsila (ST)	59.47	Pradeep Kumar Balmuchu	INC	50,645	49.31	Baiju Murmu	BJP	18,769	18.28	31,876	31.03
289	Potka (ST)	52.60	Menka Sardar	BJP	30,132	29.58	Krishna Mardi	JMM	21,235	20.84	8,897	8.74
290	Jugsalai (SC)	55.75	Dulal Bhuiyan	JMM	69,989	59.26	Mangal Ram	BJP	26,648	22.56	43,341	36.70
291	Jamshedpur East	50.50	Raghubar Das	BJP	70,358	63.90	K.P. Singh	INC	22,395	20.34	47,963	43.56
292	Jamshedpur West	47.30	Mrigendra Pratap Singh	BJP	49,413	45.13	Shamsudin Khan	INC	22,669	20.70	26,744	24.43
293	Ichagarh	63.94	Arvind Kumar Singh	BJP	37,505	35.17	Sudhir Mahato	JMM	24,741	23.20	12,764	11.97
294	Seraikella (ST)	56.73	Anant Ram Tudu	BJP	49,333	45.20	Champai Soren	JMM	40,550	37.16	8,783	8.04
295	Chaibasa (ST)	62.36	Bagun Sumbrui	INC	28,930	33.02	Deepak Birua	JMM	22,511	25.69	6,419	7.33
296	Majhgaon (ST)	61.95	Badkunwar Gagrai	BJP	25,163	33.24	Niral Purty	JMM	17,364	22.94	7,799	10.30
297	Jaganathpur (ST)	61.90	Madhu Kora	BJP	25,818	34.01	Sonaram Birua	INC	18,394	24.23	7,424	9.78
298	Manoharpur (ST)	63.03	Joba Majhi	UGDP	29,607	35.34	Shiva Bodra	BJP	20,572	24.56	9,035	10.78
299	Chakradharpur (ST)	61.28	Chumnu Oraon	BJP	24,243	30.19	Sukhdeo Hembrom	JMM	18,030	22.45	6,213	7.74
300	Kharasawan (ST)	62.89	Arjun Munda	BJP	44,521	50.78	Vijay Singh Soy	INC	30,847	35.18	13,674	15.60
301	Tamar (ST)	53.34	Ramesh Singh Munda	SAP	37,196	45.56	Kalicharan Munda	INC	18,167	22.25	19,029	23.31
302	Torpa (ST)	55.74	Koche Munda	BJP	24,986	37.23	Niral Enem Horo	IND	21,889	32.62	3,097	4.61
303	Khunti (ST)	56.52	Nilkanth Singh Munda	BJP	33,828	46.63	Sushila Kerketta	INC	25,857	35.64	7,971	10.99
304	Silli	62.72	Sudesh Kumar Mahto	UGDP	40,322	44.69	Keshaw Mahto Kamlesh	INC	25,784	28.58	14,538	16.11
305	Khijri (ST)	57.57	Sawna Lakra	INC	49,539	46.08	Karma Oraon	BJP	38,162	35.50	11,377	10.58
306	Ranchi	48.59	Chandreshwar Prasad Singh	BJP	56,445	54.96	Jai Singh Yadav	RJD	20,236	19.70	36,209	35.26
307	Hatia	51.84	Ramji Lal Sharda	BJP	51,597	46.37	Abhay Kumar Singh	RJD	29,741	26.73	21,856	19.64
308	Kanke (SC)	42.52	Ram Chandra Nayak	BJP	41,994	46.18	Samri Lal	RJD	24,603	27.05	17,391	19.13
309	Mandar (ST)	44.61	Deo Kumar Dhan	INC	23,588	27.60	Diwakar Minz	BJP	21,176	24.77	2,412	2.83
310	Sisai (ST)	31.54	Dinesh Oraon	BJP	24,508	47.43	Bandi Oraon	INC	16,745	32.41	7,763	15.02
311	Kolebira (ST)	57.23	Theodor Kiro	INC	35,266	45.12	Nirmal Kumar Besra	BJP	25,544	32.68	9,722	12.44
312	Simdega (ST)	50.24	Niel Tirkey	INC	31,514	41.23	Chatur Baraik	BJP	30,118	39.40	1,396	1.83
313	Gumla (ST)	53.23	Sudarshan Bhagat	BJP	28,905	36.12	Bernard Minj	JMM	22,228	27.78	6,677	8.34
314	Bishnupur (ST)	35.35	Chandresh Oraon	BJP	22,369	40.99	Bhukhla Bhagat	INC	18,519	33.93	3,850	7.06
315	Lohardaga (ST)	33.00	Sadhanu Bhagat	BJP	16,979	35.20	Indra Nath Bhagat	INC	16,131	33.45	848	1.75
316	Latehar (SC)	16.97	Baidynath Ram	JD(U)	7,734	31.18	Prakash Ram	RJD	4,960	19.99	2,774	11.19
317	Manika (ST)	34.34	Yamuna Singh	BJP	16,674	37.05	Ramchandra Singh	RJD	11,905	26.45	4,769	10.60
318	Panki	45.67	Madhu Singh	SAP	17,095	24.76	Videsh Singh	IND	17,058	24.70	37	0.06
319	Daltonganj	49.71	Inder Singh Namdhari	JD(U)	40,675	40.42	Anil Kumar Chaurasiya	RJD	25,132	24.98	15,543	15.44
320	Garhwa	54.67	Girinath Singh	RJD	45,239	44.69	Shyam Narayan Dubey	BJP	33,057	32.65	12,182	12.04
321	Bhawanathpur	60.45	Ram Chandra Pd. Keshri	SAP	38,350	31.70	Anant Pratap Deo	INC	29,995	24.79	8,355	6.91
322	Bishrampur	56.77	Chandrashekhar Dubey	INC	44,308	43.12	Ramchandra Chandrabanshi	RJD	31,511	30.67	12,797	12.45
323	Chhatarpur (SC)	46.33	Manoj Kumar	RJD	20,864	30.47	Sumitra Paswan	JD(U)	14,699	21.47	6,165	9.00
324	Hussainabad	54.54	Sanjay Kumar Singh Yadav	RJD	28,074	32.10	Dashrath Kumar Singh	SAP	22,102	25.27	5,972	6.83

== Government formation ==
The result was a setback for the BJP, which in media campaigns was emerging with a massive victory. RJD emerged as the single largest party. In March 2000, Nitish Kumar was elected Chief Minister of Bihar for the first time at the behest of the Vajpayee Government in the centre. NDA and allies had 151 MLAs whereas Lalu Prasad Yadav had 159 MLAs in the 324 member house. Both alliances were less than the majority mark that is 163. Nitish resigned before he could prove his numbers in the house. He lasted 7 days in the post.

With the political manoeuvring of Lalu Yadav, Rabri Devi was sworn in as the Chief Minister again. The ruling Rashtriya Janata Dal agreed to the formation of Jharkhand though a large chunk of Bihar's revenues went to the new State, because the party then had a majority of its own in the Bihar Assembly after the bifurcation of the State.

The media largely failed to gauge the ground level polarisation in Bihar. According to Sanjay Kumar:

there can be no doubt about one thing that the upper-caste media was always anti-Lalu and it was either not aware of the ground level polarisation in Bihar, or deliberately ignored it. If the election result did not appear as a setback for RJD, it was largely because of the bleak picture painted by the media. Against this background, RJD's defeat had appeared like a victory.

Even after serving imprisonment in connection with the 1997 scam, Lalu seemed to relish his role as the lower-caste jester. He argued that corruption charges against him and his family were the conspiracy of the upper-caste bureaucracy and media elites threatened by the rise of peasant cultivator castes.
