= 2024 Indian general election in Bihar =

18th Indian general election in Bihar

- 19 April – 1 June 2024

All 40 Lok Sabha seats of Bihar
- Opinion polls
- Turnout: 56.28% (▼1.05 pp)
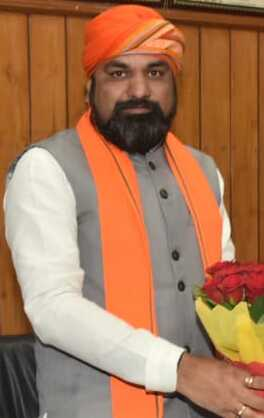

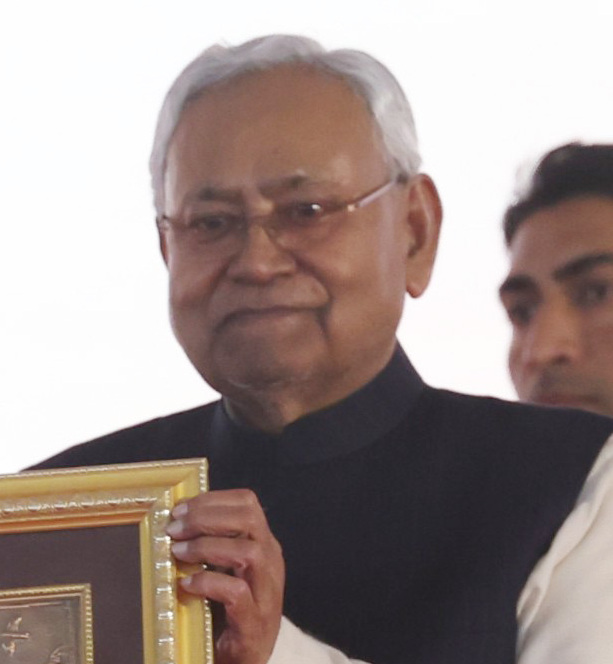

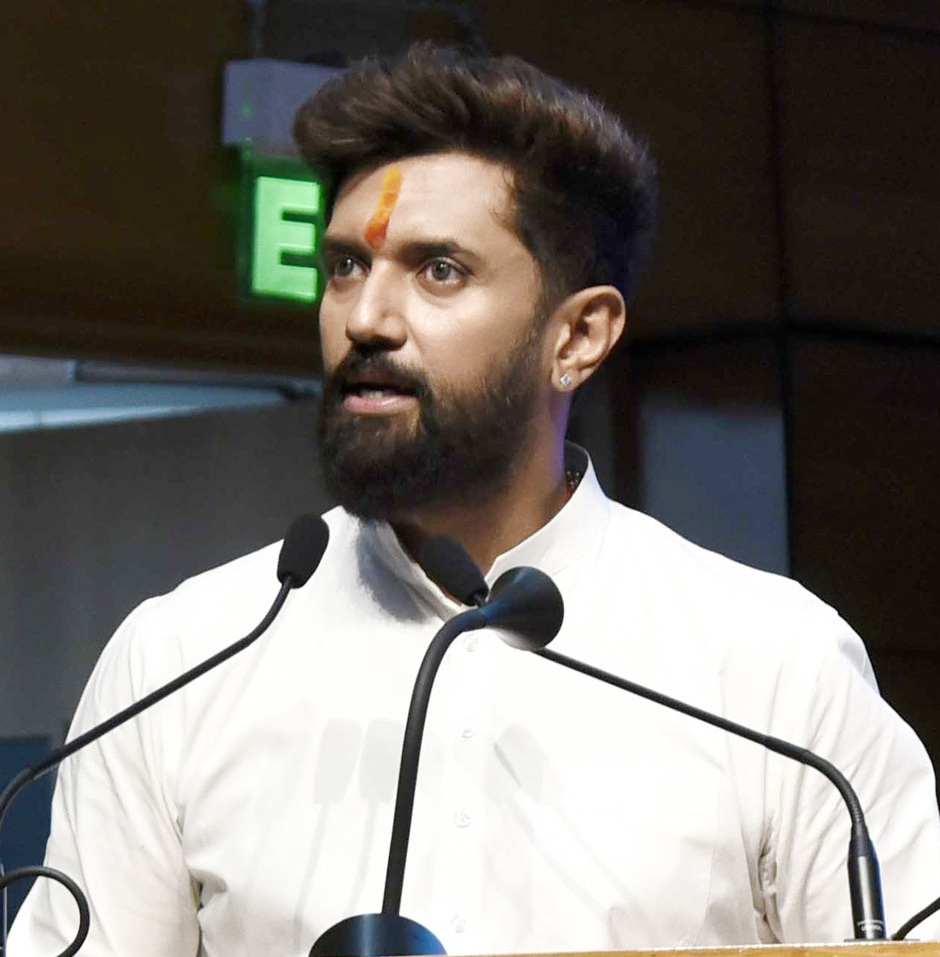

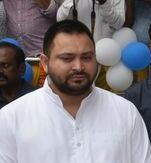

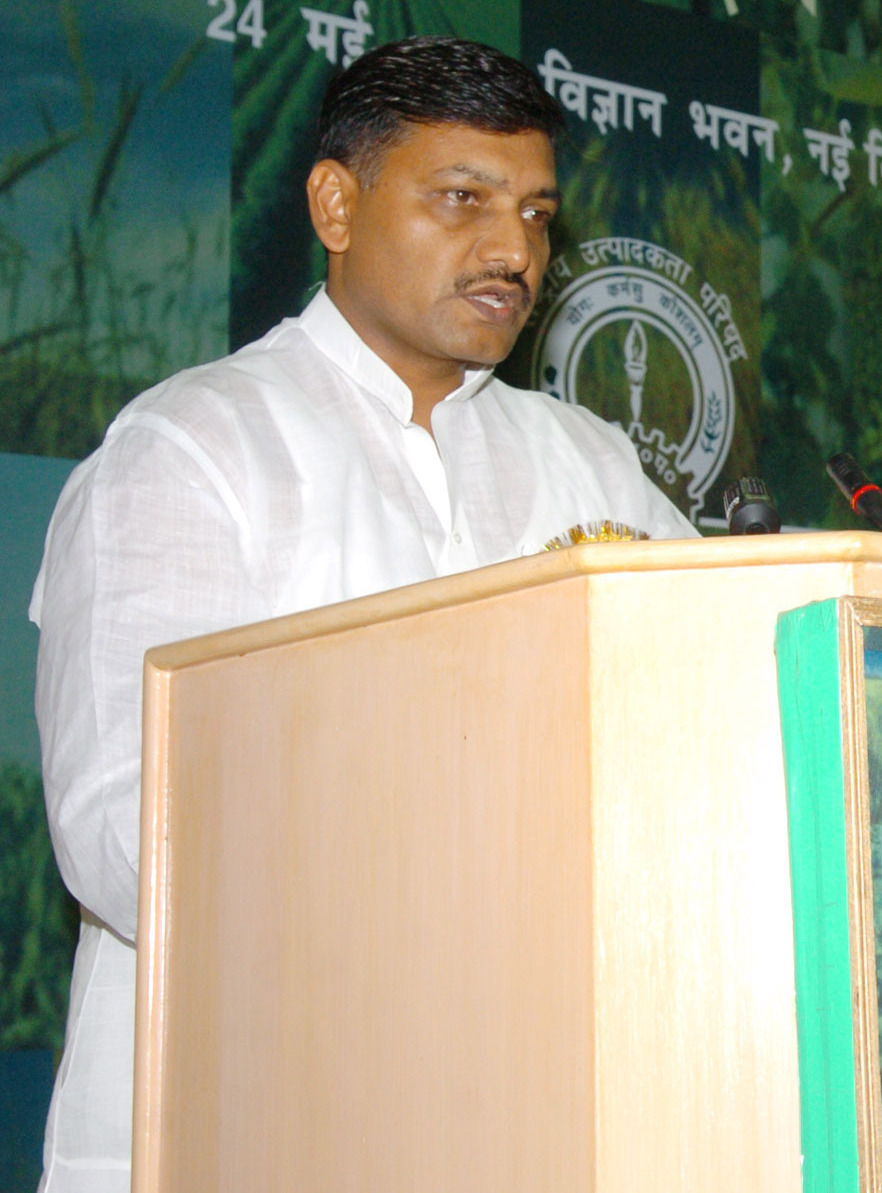

| | First party | Second party | Third party |
|---|---|---|---|
| Leader | Samrat Chaudhary | Nitish Kumar | Chirag Paswan |
| Party | BJP | JD(U) | LJP(RV) |
| Alliance | NDA | NDA | NDA |
| Leader since | 2023 | 2003 | 2021 |
| Leader's seat | Did not contest | Did not contest | Hajipur (won) |
| Last election | 23.58%, 17 seats | 21.81%, 16 seats | New Party |
| Seats won | 12 | 12 | 5 |
| Seat change | ▼5 | ▼4 | Steady |
| Popular vote | 8,885,818 | 8,020,732 | 2,803,936 |
| Percentage | 20.52% | 18.52% | 6.47% |
| Swing | ▼3.53 pp | ▼3.74 pp | New Party |
| | Fourth party | Fifth party | Sixth party |
| Leader | Tejashwi Yadav | Akhilesh Prasad Singh | Rajaram Singh and Sudama Prasad |
| Party | RJD | INC | CPI(ML)L |
| Alliance | INDIA | INDIA | INDIA |
| Leader since | 2020 | 2022 | 2024 |
| Leader's seat | Did not contest | Did not contest | Karakat (won) and Arrah (won) |
| Last election | 15.38%, 0 seats | 7.70%, 1 seat | 1.36%, 0 seats |
| Seats won | 4 | 3 | 2 |
| Seat change | ▲4 | ▲2 | ▲2 |
| Popular vote | 9,588,365 | 3,983,882 | 1,293,538 |
| Percentage | 22.14% | 9.20% | 2.99% |
| Swing | ▲6.46 pp | ▲1.35 pp | ▲1.63 pp |
Prime Minister before election
Narendra Modi
BJP
Prime Minister after election
Narendra Modi
BJP

The 2024 Indian general election was held in Bihar in all 7 phases from 19 April to 1 June to elect 40 members of the 18th Lok Sabha, with the results declared on 4 June.

Bihar, along with Uttar Pradesh and West Bengal, were the only states where the 2024 Indian general election was held in all 7 phases.

== Election schedule ==
Phase wise schedule of 2024 Indian general election in Bihar

| Poll event | Phase | | | | | | |
|---|---|---|---|---|---|---|---|
| Poll event | I | II | III | IV | V | VI | VII |
| Notification date | 20 March | 28 March | 12 April | 18 April | 26 April | 29 April | 7 May |
| Last date for filing nomination | 28 March | 4 April | 19 April | 25 April | 3 May | 6 May | 14 May |
| Scrutiny of nomination | 30 March | 5 April | 20 April | 26 April | 4 May | 7 May | 15 May |
| Last Date for withdrawal of nomination | 02 March | 8 April | 22 April | 29 April | 6 May | 9 May | 17 May |
| Date of poll | 19 April | 26 April | 7 May | 13 May | 20 May | 25 May | 1 June |
| Date of counting of votes/Result | 4 June 2024 | | | | | | |
| No. of constituencies | 4 | 5 | 5 | 5 | 5 | 8 | 8 |

== Parties and alliances ==
=== National Democratic Alliance ===
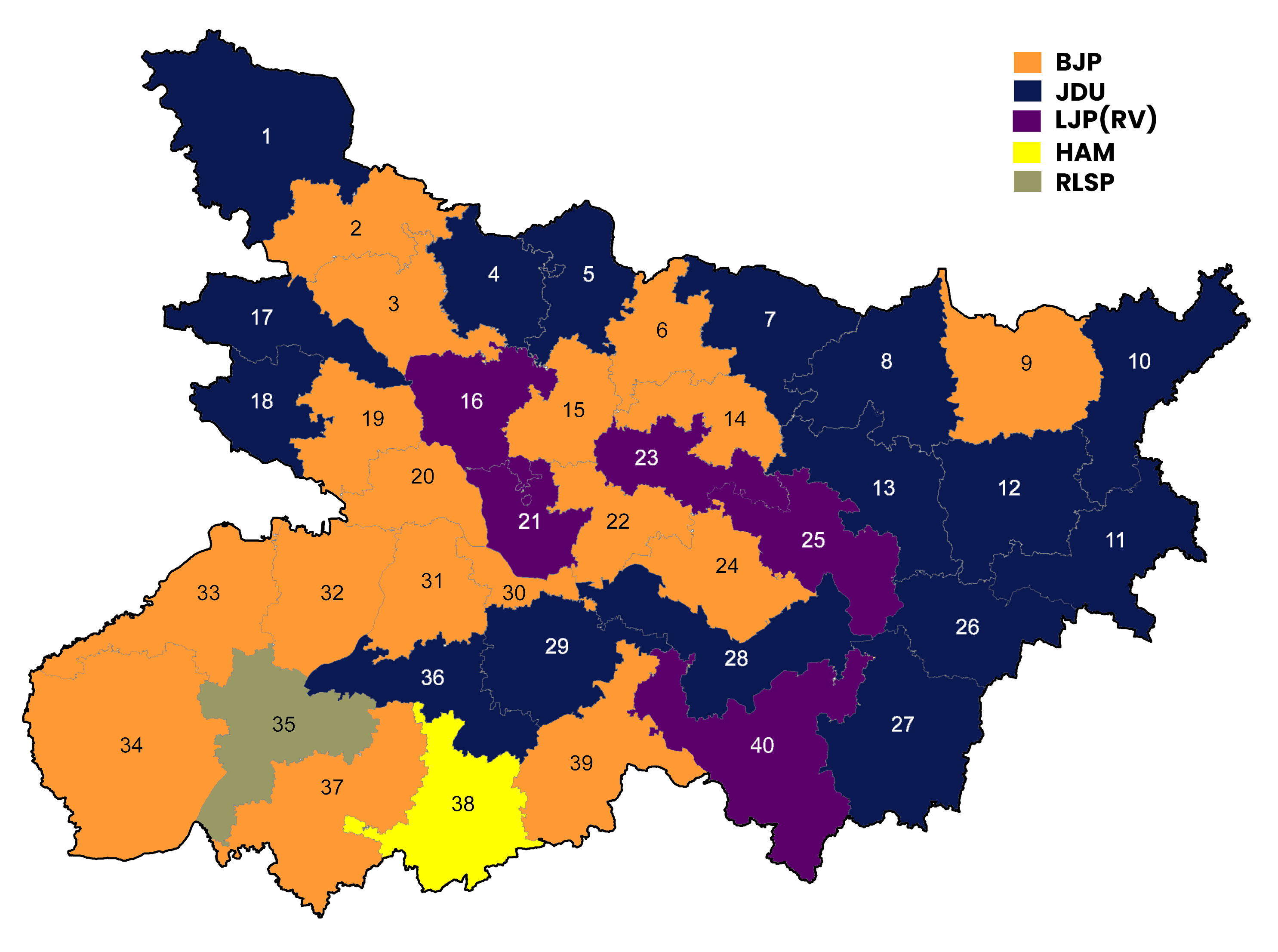
National Democratic Alliance

National Democratic Alliance
| Party | Flag | Symbol | Leader | Seats |
| Bharatiya Janata Party | | | Samrat Choudhary | 17 |
| Janata Dal (United) | | | Nitish Kumar | 16 |
| Lok Janshakti Party (Ram Vilas) | | | Chirag Paswan | 5 |
| Hindustani Awam Morcha | | | Jitan Ram Manjhi | 1 |
| Rashtriya Lok Morcha | | | Upendra Kushwaha | 1 |
| Total | | | | 40 |

=== Indian National Developmental Inclusive Alliance ===
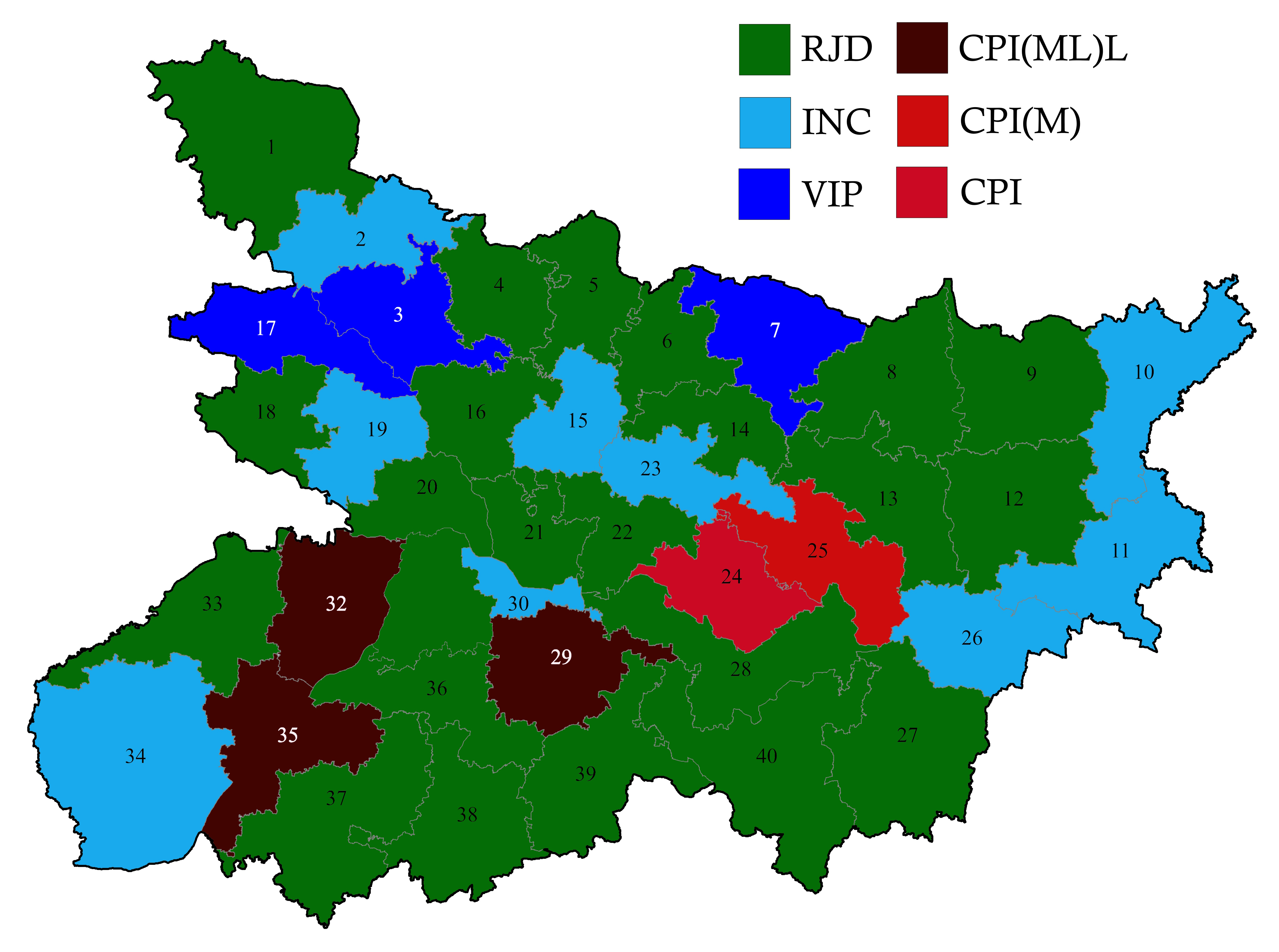
Indian National Developmental Inclusive Alliance

Indian National Developmental Inclusive Alliance
| Party | Flag | Symbol | Leader | Seats |
| Rashtriya Janata Dal | | | Lalu Yadav | 23 |
| Indian National Congress | | | Akhilesh Prasad Singh | 9 |
| Communist Party of India (Marxist–Leninist) Liberation | | | Shyam Chandra Chaudhary | 3 |
| Vikassheel Insaan Party | | | Mukesh Sahani | 3 |
| Communist Party of India (Marxist) | | | Lalan Chaudhary | 1 |
| Communist Party of India | | | Ram Naresh Pandey | 1 |
| Total | | | | |

=== Others ===
| Party | Flag | Symbol | Leader | Seats contested |
|---|---|---|---|---|
| All India Majlis-e-Ittehadul Muslimeen | | | Akhtarul Iman | 8 |

== Candidates ==
| Constituency | | NDA | | INDIA | |
| # | Name | Party | Candidate | Party | Candidate |
|---|---|---|---|---|---|
| 1 | Valmiki Nagar | JD(U) | Sunil Kumar Kushwaha | RJD | Deepak Yadav |
| 2 | Paschim Champaran | BJP | Sanjay Jaiswal | INC | Madan Mohan Tiwari |
| 3 | Purvi Champaran | BJP | Radha Mohan Singh | VIP | Rajesh Kushwaha |
| 4 | Sheohar | JD(U) | Lovely Anand | RJD | Ritu Jaiswal |
| 5 | Sitamarhi | JD(U) | Devesh Chandra Thakur | RJD | Arjun Rai |
| 6 | Madhubani | BJP | Ashok Kumar Yadav | RJD | Ali Ashraf Fatmi |
| 7 | Jhanjharpur | JD(U) | Ramprit Mandal | VIP | Suman Kumar Mahaseth |
| 8 | Supaul | JD(U) | Dileshwar Kamait | RJD | Chandrahas Chaupal |
| 9 | Araria | BJP | Pradeep Kumar Singh | RJD | Md. Shahnawaz Alam |
| 10 | Kishanganj | JD(U) | Mujahid Alam | INC | Md. Jawed |
| 11 | Katihar | JD(U) | Dulal Chandra Goswami | INC | Tariq Anwar |
| 12 | Purnia | JD(U) | Santosh Kushwaha | RJD | Beema Bharti |
| 13 | Madhepura | JD(U) | Dinesh Chandra Yadav | RJD | Prof. Kumar Chandradeep |
| 14 | Darbhanga | BJP | Gopal Jee Thakur | RJD | Lalit Kumar Yadav |
| 15 | Muzaffarpur | BJP | Raj Bhushan Nishad | INC | Ajay Nishad |
| 16 | Vaishali | LJP(RV) | Veena Devi | RJD | Munna Shukla |
| 17 | Gopalganj (SC) | JD(U) | Alok Kumar Suman | VIP | Premnath Chanchal |
| 18 | Siwan | JD(U) | Vijay Lakshmi Kushwaha | RJD | Awadh Bihari Choudhary |
| 19 | Maharajganj | BJP | Janardan Singh Sigriwal | INC | Akash Prasad Singh |
| 20 | Saran | BJP | Rajiv Pratap Rudy | RJD | Rohini Acharya |
| 21 | Hajipur (SC) | LJP(RV) | Chirag Paswan | RJD | Shiv Chandra Ram |
| 22 | Ujiarpur | BJP | Nityanand Rai | RJD | Alok Kumar Mehta |
| 23 | Samastipur (SC) | LJP(RV) | Shambhavi Choudhary | INC | Sunny Hazari |
| 24 | Begusarai | BJP | Giriraj Singh | CPI | Awadhesh Kumar Rai |
| 25 | Khagaria | LJP(RV) | Rajesh Verma | CPI(M) | Sanjay Kumar Kushwaha |
| 26 | Bhagalpur | JD(U) | Ajay Kumar Mandal | INC | Ajeet Sharma |
| 27 | Banka | JD(U) | Giridhari Yadav | RJD | Jay Prakash Narayan Yadav |
| 28 | Munger | JD(U) | Rajiv Ranjan Singh | RJD | Anita Devi Mahto |
| 29 | Nalanda | JD(U) | Kaushalendra Kumar | CPI(ML)L | Sandeep Saurav |
| 30 | Patna Sahib | BJP | Ravi Shankar Prasad | INC | Anshul Avijit Kushwaha |
| 31 | Pataliputra | BJP | Ram Kripal Yadav | RJD | Misa Bharti |
| 32 | Arrah | BJP | R. K. Singh | CPI(ML)L | Sudama Prasad |
| 33 | Buxar | BJP | Mithilesh Tiwari | RJD | Sudhakar Singh |
| 34 | Sasaram (SC) | BJP | Shivesh Ram | INC | Manoj Kumar |
| 35 | Karakat | RLM | Upendra Kushwaha | CPI(ML)L | Raja Ram Singh Kushwaha |
| 36 | Jahanabad | JD(U) | Chandeshwar Prasad | RJD | Surendra Prasad Yadav |
| 37 | Aurangabad | BJP | Sushil Kumar Singh | RJD | Abhay Kushwaha |
| 38 | Gaya (SC) | HAM(S) | Jitan Ram Manjhi | RJD | Kumar Sarvjeet |
| 39 | Nawada | BJP | Vivek Thakur | RJD | Shravan Kushwaha |
| 40 | Jamui (SC) | LJP(RV) | Arun Bharti | RJD | Archana Ravidas |

== Campaigns ==
=== Indian National Developmental Inclusive Alliance ===
The Indian National Congress began its Bihar section of the Bharat Jodo Nyay Yatra from Kishanganj on 28 January 2024. Congress leader Rahul Gandhi criticised chief minister Nitish Kumar for rejoining the NDA and said that the Mahagathbandhan did not need him and that it would keep fighting for social justice. On 15 February, Gandhi resumed his yatra from Bihar's Aurangabad, where he promised a financial survey to assess the ground reality if his alliance comes to power. The yatra resumed from Sasaram the next day, where Rashtriya Janata Dal chairperson and former state deputy CM Tejashwi Yadav joined the yatra, touring the state with Gandhi in a jeep.

The Rashtriya Janata Dal began its campaign with its Jan Vishwas Yatra ("People's Trust Yatra") on 20 February 2024. RJD leader Tejashwi Yadav launched the yatra from Muzaffarpur in Bihar. The yatra will last till 1 March 2024 and will have covered 33 districts. In Siwan on 23 February, Yadav termed the BJP "a dustbin" which takes in other parties that have become "garbage". The Rashtriya Janata Dal also worked to expand its social base while holding its core Muslim-Yadav support base firmly. The majority of the candidates of Rashtriya Janata Dal on all 23 seats it contested were from Other Backward Class and Extremely Backward Castes. The party fielded 8 Yadav candidates, while the Koeri and Kurmis also got a fair share. It fielded three Koeris, Alok Kumar Mehta from Ujiarpur, Shravan Kushwaha from Nawada and Abhay Kushwaha from Aurangabad constituency. RJD also fielded six women candidates– Ritu Jaiswal (Sheohar), Anita Devi Mahto (Munger), Bima Bharati (Purnea), Archana Ravidas (Jamui), Misa Bharti (Pataliputra) and Rohini Acharya from Saran.

RJD also faced opposition from its own party members in constituencies like Nawada, where RJD's sitting legislators Vibha Devi and Prakash Veer were spotted campaigning for independent candidate Vinod Yadav, brother of former RJD legislator, Rajballabh Yadav instead of party's declared candidate Shravan Kushwaha. In overall ticket distribution of the NDA and INDIA bloc, 16 Yadav candidates were made candidates out of 80 candidates from both sides. The Koeris with 11 candidates were the second largest caste.

== Events and outcomes ==
During the election, the Karakat Lok Sabha constituency in the Rohtas district of Bihar drew nationwide attention, when Bhojpuri singer and actor Pawan Singh declared that he will contest the Lok Sabha election from there. Earlier, Singh was made a candidate of Bharatiya Janata Party from Asansol Lok Sabha constituency against Shatrughan Sinha, but Singh refused to contest from there. Unable to secure the candidature of National Democratic Alliance from Arrah Lok Sabha constituency, he made the contest in the Karakat triangular. It was speculated that he will cut the major chunk of NDA votes of Rajput caste, the community to which he belonged. In the aftermath of voting process, Singh was able to get over two lakh votes, pushing NDA candidate Upendra Kushwaha to the third spot. He was, however, defeated by Raja Ram Singh Kushwaha of Communist Party of India (Marxist-Leninist) Liberation by a margin of over one lakh votes. The division in votes of NDA due to Singh led to the victory of CPIML candidate.

However, the defeat of former union minister Upendra Kushwaha, who was considered as the tallest leader of the Koeri caste in Bihar, sent shockwaves across the state, specially in the Magadh and Shahabad belt. There witnessed a palpable anger amongst the member of Koeri caste on Pawan Singh contesting from the constituency considered as the stronghold of the community against Upendra Kushwaha. As a consequence, the Koeris across the Shahabad voted again the Rajput candidates and the Bharatiya Janata Party as the Rashtriya Janata Dal and its alliance partners like CPIML were successful in conveying the message that Pawan Singh was sent by Bharatiya Janata Party to spoil the votes of Upendra Kushwaha. This led to defeat of veteran Rajput leaders R. K. Singh and Sushil Kumar Singh in the nearby Arrah and Aurangabad constituency. Besides this, NDA also lost Buxar and Sasaram leading to wiping out of BJP from the whole Shahabad region.

Earlier, BJP had raised Samrat Chaudhary to the post of party's Bihar unit president in a bid to bring Kushwahas within the fold of BJP. However, discontent was seen amongst the Kushwahas on the ground level as Chaudary was not able to field any Kushwaha candidate on the symbol of BJP in 2024 polls. Although, only two out of seven Kushwaha candidates were able to win from the INDIA alliance, the margin of victory of the NDA candidates was drastically reduced in every seat, where there was a Kushwaha candidate from the side of INDIA bloc. This showed major chunk of Kushwaha voters supporting and voting for INDIA as against NDA.

== Surveys and polls ==
=== Opinion polls ===
| Polling agency | Date published | Margin of error | | | | Lead |
| Polling agency | Date published | Margin of error | NDA | INDIA | Others | Lead |
| ABP News-CVoter | April 2024 | ±3-5% | 33 | 7 | 0 | NDA |
| ABP News-CVoter | March 2024 | ±5% | 32 | 8 | 0 | NDA |
| India Today-CVoter | February 2024 | ±3-5% | 32 | 8 | 0 | NDA |
JD(U) leaves INDIA and joins NDA
| ABP News-CVoter | December 2023 | ±3-5% | 16-18 | 21-23 | 0-2 | INDIA |
| Times Now-ETG | December 2023 | ±3% | 22-24 | 15-17 | 0 | NDA |
| India TV-CNX | October 2023 | ±3% | 24 | 16 | 0 | NDA |
| Times Now-ETG | September 2023 | ±3% | 18-20 | 20-22 | 0 | INDIA |
| Times Now-ETG | August 2023 | ±3% | 22-24 | 16-18 | 0 | NDA |
| India Today-CVoter | August 2023 | ±3-5% | 14 | 26 | 0 | INDIA |

| Polling agency | Date published | Margin of error | | | | Lead |
| Polling agency | Date published | Margin of error | NDA | INDIA | Others | Lead |
| ABP News-CVoter | April 2024 | ±3-5% | 50.8% | 39.9% | 9.3% | 10.9 |
| ABP News-CVoter | March 2024 | ±5% | 50% | 35% | 15% | 15 |
| India Today-CVoter | February 2024 | ±3-5% | 52% | 38% | 10% | 14 |
JD(U) leaves INDIA and joins NDA
| India Today-CVoter | August 2023 | ±3-5% | 43% | 47% | 10% | 4 |

=== Exit polls ===
| Polling agency | | | | Lead |
| Polling agency | NDA | INDIA | Others | Lead |
| India Today Axis My India | 29-33 | 7-10 | 0 | NDA |
| DB Live | 14-16 | 24-26 | 0 | INDIA |
| Jan Ki Baat | 33-37 | 3-7 | 0 | NDA |
| News18 | 31-34 | 6-9 | 0 | NDA |
| ABP C-Voter | 35-38 | 3-5 | 0 | NDA |
| TV9 Bharatvarsh- People's Insight - Polstrat | 29 | 8 | 3 | NDA |
| Pratik - Classification | 28 | 12 | 0 | NDA |
| 2019 election results | 39 | 1 | 0 | NDA |
| Actual results | 30 | 9 | 1 | NDA |

== Voter turnout ==
=== Phase wise ===
| Phase | Poll date | Constituencies | Voter turnout (%) |
|---|---|---|---|
| I | 19 April 2024 | Aurangabad, Gaya, Nawada, Jamui | 49.26% |
| II | 26 April 2024 | Kishanganj, Purnia, Katihar, Bhagalpur, Banka | 59.45% |
| III | 7 May 2024 | Jhanjarpur, Supaul, Araria, Madhepura, Khagaria | 59.14% |
| IV | 13 May 2024 | Darbhanga, Ujiarpur, Samastipur, Begusarai, Munger | 58.21% |
| V | 20 May 2024 | Sitamarhi, Madhubani, Muzaffarpur, Saran, Hajipur | 56.76% |
| VI | 25 May 2024 | Valmiki Nagar, Paschim Champaran, Purvi Champaran, Sheohar, Vaishali, Gopalganj, Siwan, Maharajganj | 57.18% |
| VII | 1 June 2024 | Nalanda, Patna Sahib, Pataliputra, Arrah, Buxar, Sasaram, Karakat, Jahanabad | 53.29% |
| Total | | | |

=== Constituency wise ===
| Constituency | | Poll date | Turnout | Swing |
|---|---|---|---|---|
| 1 | Valmiki Nagar | 25 May 2024 | 60.19% | 1.17%▼ |
| 2 | Paschim Champaran | 25 May 2024 | 61.62% | 0.40%▼ |
| 3 | Purvi Champaran | 25 May 2024 | 59.68% | 0.62%▼ |
| 4 | Sheohar | 25 May 2024 | 57.40% | 2.20%▼ |
| 5 | Sitamarhi | 20 May 2024 | 56.21% | 3.11%▼ |
| 6 | Madhubani | 20 May 2024 | 53.04% | 0.77%▼ |
| 7 | Jhanjharpur | 7 May 2024 | 54.48% | 2.87%▼ |
| 8 | Supaul | 7 May 2024 | 63.55% | 2.17%▼ |
| 9 | Araria | 7 May 2024 | 61.93% | 2.86%▼ |
| 10 | Kishanganj | 26 April 2024 | 62.84% | 3.54%▼ |
| 11 | Katihar | 26 April 2024 | 63.76% | 3.88%▼ |
| 12 | Purnia | 26 April 2024 | 63.08% | 2.29%▼ |
| 13 | Madhepura | 7 May 2024 | 58.29% | 2.60%▼ |
| 14 | Darbhanga | 13 May 2024 | 57.37% | 0.98%▼ |
| 15 | Muzaffarpur | 20 May 2024 | 59.47% | 3.56%▼ |
| 16 | Vaishali | 25 May 2024 | 62.59% | 0.68%▲ |
| 17 | Gopalganj (SC) | 25 May 2024 | 52.32% | 3.46%▼ |
| 18 | Siwan | 25 May 2024 | 52.49% | 2.24%▼ |
| 19 | Maharajganj | 25 May 2024 | 52.27% | 1.55%▼ |
| 20 | Saran | 20 May 2024 | 56.73% | 0.13%▲ |
| 21 | Hajipur (SC) | 20 May 2024 | 58.43% | 3.17%▲ |
| 22 | Ujiarpur | 13 May 2024 | 59.59% | 0.56%▼ |
| 23 | Samastipur (SC) | 13 May 2024 | 60.11% | 0.63%▼ |
| 24 | Begusarai | 13 May 2024 | 58.70% | 3.93%▼ |
| 25 | Khagaria | 7 May 2024 | 57.48% | 0.23%▼ |
| 26 | Bhagalpur | 26 April 2024 | 53.50% | 3.70%▼ |
| 27 | Banka | 26 April 2024 | 54.48% | 4.12%▼ |
| 28 | Munger | 13 May 2024 | 55.55% | 0.65%▲ |
| 29 | Nalanda | 1 June 2024 | 49.78% | 5.01%▼ |
| 30 | Patna Sahib | 1 June 2024 | 46.85% | 1.05%▲ |
| 31 | Pataliputra | 1 June 2024 | 59.27% | 3.24%▲ |
| 32 | Arrah | 1 June 2024 | 50.27% | 1.54%▼ |
| 33 | Buxar | 1 June 2024 | 55.39% | 1.44%▲ |
| 34 | Sasaram (SC) | 1 June 2024 | 57.16% | 2.59%▲ |
| 35 | Karakat | 1 June 2024 | 54.68% | 5.59%▲ |
| 36 | Jahanabad | 1 June 2024 | 55.09% | 3.33%▲ |
| 37 | Aurangabad | 19 April 2024 | 50.35% | 3.32%▼ |
| 38 | Gaya (SC) | 19 April 2024 | 52.76% | 3.42%▼ |
| 39 | Nawada | 19 April 2024 | 43.17% | 6.56%▼ |
| 40 | Jamui (SC) | 19 April 2024 | 51.25% | 4.00%▼ |

== Results ==
=== Results by alliance or party ===
| Alliance/ Party | | Popular vote | | | Seats | | |
| Alliance/ Party | | Votes | % | ±pp | Contested | Won | +/− |
|---|---|---|---|---|---|---|---|
| NDA | BJP | 8,885,818 | 20.52% | ▼3.53 | 17 | 12 | ▼5 |
| NDA | JD(U) | 8,020,732 | 18.52% | ▼3.74 | 16 | 12 | ▼4 |
| NDA | LJP(RV) | 2,803,936 | 6.47% | New | 5 | 5 | ▲5 |
| NDA | HAM | 494,960 | 1.14% | | 1 | 1 | ▲1 |
| NDA | RLM | 253,876 | 0.58% | New | 1 | 0 | Steady |
| NDA | Total | 20,459,322 | 47.23% | | 40 | 30 | ▼3 |
| INDIA | RJD | 9,588,365 | 22.14% | ▲6.46 | 23 | 4 | ▲4 |
| INDIA | INC | 3,983,882 | 9.20% | ▲1.35 | 9 | 3 | ▲2 |
| INDIA | CPI(ML)L | 1,293,538 | 2.99% | | 3 | 2 | ▲2 |
| INDIA | VIP | 1,187,455 | 2.71% | ▲1.05 | 3 | 0 | Steady |
| INDIA | CPI | 564,310 | 1.30% | | 1 | 0 | Steady |
| INDIA | CPI(M) | 375,988 | 0.87% | | 1 | 0 | Steady |
| INDIA | Total | 16,993,538 | 39.21% | | 40 | 9 | ▲8 |
| Others | | | | | | | Steady |
| IND | | | | | | 1 | ▲1 |
| NOTA | | 8,97,323 | 2.07% | | | | |
| Total | | | 100% | - | | 40 | - |

=== Results by constituency ===
| Constituency | | | Winner | | | | Runner Up | | | | Margin | % |
| # | Name | Poll % | Candidate | Party | Votes | % | Candidate | Party | Votes | % | Margin | % |
|---|---|---|---|---|---|---|---|---|---|---|---|---|
| 1 | Valmiki Nagar | 60.33 ▼ | Sunil Kumar | JD(U) | 5,23,422 | 47.50 | Deepak Vadav | RJD | 4,24,747 | 38.55 | 98,675 | 8.95 |
| 2 | Paschim Champaran | 61.78 ▼ | Sanjay Jaiswal | BJP | 5,80,421 | 53.43 | Madan Mohan Tiwari | INC | 4,43,853 | 40.86 | 1,36,568 | 12.57 |
| 3 | Purvi Champaran | 59.90 ▼ | Radha Mohan Singh | BJP | 5,80,421 | 50.50 | Rajesh Kumar | VIP | 4,43,853 | 42.28 | 88,287 | 8.22 |
| 4 | Sheohar | 57.56 ▼ | Lovely Anand | JD(U) | 476,612 | 45.15 | Ritu Jaiswal | RJD | 4,47,469 | 42.39 | 29,143 | 2.76 |
| 5 | Sitamarhi | 56.25 ▼ | Devesh Chandra Thakur | JD(U) | 5,15,719 | 47.14 | Arjun Ray | RJD | 4,64,363 | 42.45 | 51,356 | 4.69 |
| 6 | Madhubani | 53.08 ▼ | Ashok Kumar Yadav | BJP | 5,53,428 | 53.85 | Md. Ali Ashraf Fatmi | RJD | 4,24,747 | 39.07 | 1,51,945 | 14.78 |
| 7 | Jhanjharpur | 54.48▼ | Ramprit Mandal | JD(U) | 5,33,032 | 48.73 | Suman Kumar Mahaseth | VIP | 3,48,863 | 31.90 | 1,84,169 | 16.83 |
| 8 | Supaul | 63.55▼ | Dileshwar Kamait | JD(U) | 5,95,038 | 48.33 | Chandrahas Chaupal | RJD | 4,25,235 | 34.54 | 1,69,803 | 13.79 |
| 9 | Araria | 61.93▼ | Pradeep Kumar Singh | BJP | 6,00,146 | 47.91 | Md. Shahnawaz Alam | RJD | 5,80,052 | 46.31 | 20,094 | 1.60 |
| 10 | Kishanganj | 62.84▼ | Mohammad Jawed | INC | 4,02,850 | 35.00 | Mujahid Alam | JD(U) | 3,43,158 | 29.81 | 59,692 | 5.19 |
| 11 | Katihar | 63.76▼ | Tariq Anwar | INC | 5,67,092 | 48.41 | Dulal Chandra Goswami | JD(U) | 5,17,229 | 44.15 | 49,863 | 4.26 |
| 12 | Purnia | 63.08▼ | Pappu Yadav | IND | 5,67,556 | 47.46 | Santosh Kumar | JD(U) | 5,43,709 | 45.47 | 23,847 | 1.99 |
| 13 | Madhepura | 58.29▼ | Dinesh Chandra Yadav | JD(U) | 6,40,649 | 52.96 | Da Kumar Chandrareep | RJD | 4,66,115 | 38.53 | 1,74,534 | 14.43 |
| 14 | Darbhanga | 57.37▼ | Gopal Jee Thakur | BJP | 5,66,630 | 55.33 | Lalit Kumar Yadav | RJD | 3,88,474 | 37.93 | 1,78,156 | 17.40 |
| 15 | Muzaffarpur | 59.47▼ | Raj Bhushan Choudhary | BJP | 6,19,749 | 55.71 | Ajay Nishad | INC | 3,84,822 | 34.59 | 2,34,927 | 21.12 |
| 16 | Vaishali | 62.59▲ | Veena Devi | LJP(RV) | 5,67,043 | 48.38 | Vijay Kumar Shukla | RJD | 4,77,409 | 40.73 | 89,634 | 7.65 |
| 17 | Gopalganj (SC) | 52.32▼ | Alok Kumar Suman | JD(U) | 5,11,866 | 48.15 | Chanchal Paswan | VIP | 3,84,686 | 36.19 | 1,27,180 | 11.96 |
| 18 | Siwan | 52.49▼ | Vijaylakshmi Devi | JD(U) | 3,86,508 | 38.73 | Hena Shahab | IND | 2,93,651 | 29.42 | 92,857 | 9.31 |
| 19 | Maharajganj | 52.27▼ | Janardan Singh | BJP | 5,29,533 | 52.22 | Aakash Kumar Singh | INC | 4,26,882 | 42.09 | 1,02,651 | 10.13 |
| 20 | Saran | 56.73▲ | Rajiv Pratap Rudy | BJP | 4,71,752 | 46.18 | Rohini Acharya | RJD | 4,58,091 | 44.84 | 13,661 | 1.34 |
| 21 | Hajipur (SC) | 58.43▲ | Chirag Paswan | LJP(RV) | 6,15,718 | 53.29 | Shiv Chandra Ram | RJD | 4,45,613 | 38.57 | 1,70,105 | 14.72 |
| 22 | Ujiarpur | 59.59▼ | Nityanand Rai | BJP | 5,15,965 | 49.51 | Alok Kumar Mehta | RJD | 4,55,863 | 43.75 | 60,102 | 5.76 |
| 23 | Samastipur (SC) | 60.11▼ | Shambhavi Choudhary | LJP(RV) | 5,79,786 | 52.97 | Sunny Hazari | INC | 3,92,535 | 35.86 | 1,87,251 | 17.11 |
| 24 | Begusarai | 58.70▼ | Giriraj Singh | BJP | 6,49,331 | 50.15 | Abdhesh Kumar Roy | CPI | 5,67,851 | 43.86 | 81,480 | 6.29 |
| 25 | Khagaria | 57.48▼ | Rajesh Verma | LJP(RV) | 5,38,657 | 50.73 | Sanjay Kumar | CPI(M) | 3,77,526 | 35.55 | 1,61,131 | 15.18 |
| 26 | Bhagalpur | 53.50▼ | Ajay Kumar Mandal | JD(U) | 5,36,031 | 50.38 | Ajeet Sharma | INC | 4,31,163 | 40.52 | 1,04,868 | 9.86 |
| 27 | Banka | 54.48▼ | Giridhari Yadav | JD(U) | 5,06,678 | 49.96 | Jay Prakash Narayan | RJD | 4,02,834 | 39.72 | 1,03,844 | 10.24 |
| 28 | Munger | 55.55▲ | Lalan Singh | JD(U) | 5,50,146 | 48.30 | Kumari Anita | RJD | 4,69,276 | 41.20 | 80,870 | 7.10 |
| 29 | Nalanda | 49.78▼ | Kaushalendra Kumar | JD(U) | 5,59,422 | 48.88 | Sandeep Saurav | CPI(ML)L | 3,90,308 | 34.11 | 1,69,114 | 14.77 |
| 30 | Patna Sahib | 46.85▲ | Ravi Shankar Prasad | BJP | 5,88,270 | 54.70 | Anshul Avijit | INC | 4,34,424 | 40.39 | 1,53,846 | 14.31 |
| 31 | Pataliputra | 59.27▲ | Misa Bharti | RJD | 6,13,283 | 49.86 | Ram Kripal Yadav | BJP | 5,28,109 | 42.93 | 85,174 | 6.93 |
| 32 | Arrah | 50.27▼ | Sudama Prasad | CPI(ML)L | 5,29,382 | 48.28 | Raj Kumar Singh | BJP | 4,69,574 | 42.82 | 59,808 | 5.46 |
| 33 | Buxar | 55.39▲ | Sudhakar Singh | RJD | 4,38,345 | 40.82 | Mithilesh Tiwari | BJP | 4,08,254 | 38.02 | 30,091 | 2.80 |
| 34 | Sasaram (SC) | 57.16▲ | Manoj Kumar | INC | 5,13,004 | 46.76 | Shivesh Kumar | BJP | 4,93,847 | 45.01 | 19,157 | 1.75 |
| 35 | Karakat | 54.68▲ | Raja Ram Singh | CPI(ML)L | 3,80,581 | 36.89 | Pawan Singh | IND | 2,74,723 | 26.63 | 1,05,858 | 10.26 |
| 36 | Jahanabad | 55.09▲ | Surendra Prasad Yadav | RJD | 4,43,035 | 47.88 | Chandeshwar Prasad | JD(U) | 3,00,444 | 32.47 | 1,42,591 | 15.41 |
| 37 | Aurangabad | 50.35▼ | Abhay Kushwaha | RJD | 4,65,567 | 49.22 | Sushil Kumar Singh | BJP | 3,86,456 | 40.86 | 79,111 | 8.36 |
| 38 | Gaya (SC) | 52.76▼ | Jitan Ram Manjhi | HAM(S) | 4,94,960 | 51.36 | Kumar Sarvjeet | RJD | 3,93,148 | 40.80 | 1,01,812 | 10.56 |
| 39 | Nawada | 43.17▼ | Vivek Thakur | BJP | 4,10,608 | 47.20 | Shrawan Kumar | RJD | 3,42,938 | 39.42 | 67,670 | 7.78 |
| 40 | Jamui (SC) | 51.25▼ | Arun Bharti | LJP(RV) | 5,09,046 | 51.98 | Archana Kumari | RJD | 4,45,613 | 40.50 | 1,12,482 | 11.48 |

== Assembly segments wise lead of Parties ==
2024 Bihar Lok Sabha Elections Assembly Wise Leads Map

| Party | | Assembly segments | Current Position in the 2025 Assembly election |
|---|---|---|---|
| NDA | JD(U) | 74 | 85 |
| NDA | BJP | 67 | 89 |
| NDA | LJP(RV) | 29 | 19 |
| NDA | HAM(S) | 4 | 5 |
| NDA | RLM | 0 | 4 |
| NDA | Total | 174 | 202 |
| INDIA | RJD | 36 | 25 |
| INDIA | INC | 12 | 6 |
| INDIA | CPI(ML)L | 12 | 2 |
| INDIA | CPI | 1 | 0 |
| INDIA | IIP | Did not exist | 1 |
| INDIA | CPI(M) | 0 | 1 |
| INDIA | VIP | 1 | 0 |
| INDIA | Total | 62 | 35 |
| Others | Independents | 5 | 0 |
| Others | AIMIM | 2 | 5 |
| Others | BSP | 0 | 1 |
| Others | Total | 7 | 6 |
| Total | | 243 | |

== See also ==
- 2024 Indian general election in Chandigarh
- 2024 Indian general election in Chhattisgarh
- 2024 Indian general election in Dadra and Nagar Haveli and Daman and Diu
