= Gaya Lok Sabha constituency =

Lok Sabha constituency in Bihar

Coordinates: 24.80°N 84.99°E

Gaya
- Lok Sabha constituency

Constituency details
- Country: India
- Region: East India
- State: Bihar
- Assembly constituencies: Sherghati; Barachatti; Bodh Gaya; Gaya Town; Belaganj; Wazirganj
- Established: 1952
- Total electors: 17,54,390
- Reservation: SC

Member of Parliament
- 18th Lok Sabha
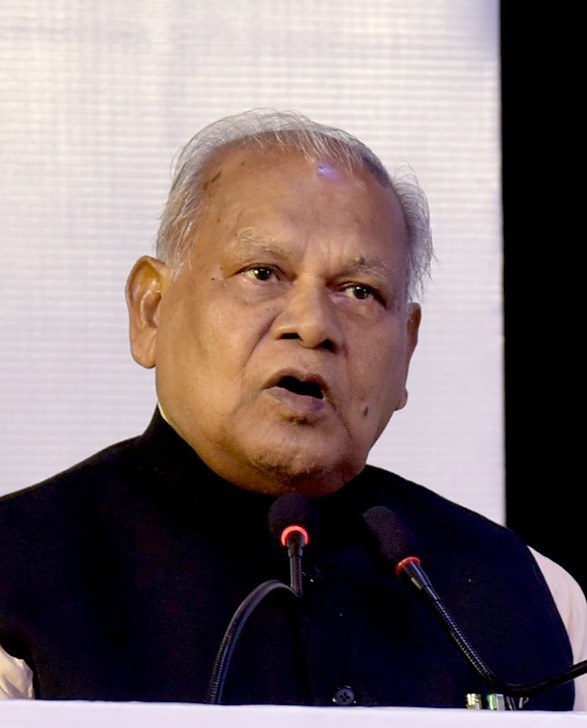
- Incumbent Jitan Ram Manjhi; Union Minister of Micro, Small and Medium Enterprises
- Party: HAM(S)
- Alliance: NDA
- Elected year: 2024
- Preceded by: Vijay Kumar Manjhi, JD(U)

Gaya Lok Sabha constituency is one of the 40 Lok Sabha (lower house of the Indian parliament) constituencies in the Indian state of Bihar. In the 2024 Indian general election, Jitan Ram Manjhi secured this constituency by defeating Kumar Sarvjeet of Rashtriya Janata Dal.

== Assembly segments ==
Currently, the Gaya Lok Sabha constituency comprises the following six Vidhan Sabha (legislative assembly) segments:

#	Name	District	Member	Party	2024 lead
226	Sherghati	Gaya	Uday Kumar Singh	LJP(RV)	HAM(S)
228	Barachatti (SC)	Gaya	Jyoti Devi	HAM(S)	HAM(S)
229	Bodh Gaya (SC)	Gaya	Kumar Sarvjeet	RJD	HAM(S)
230	Gaya Town	Gaya	Prem Kumar	BJP	HAM(S)
232	Belaganj	Gaya	Manorama Devi	JD(U)	RJD
234	Wazirganj	Gaya	Birendra Singh	BJP	HAM(S)

== Members of Parliament ==
The following is the list of the MPs elected from this Lok Sabha constituency:

Year	Name	Party
1952	Brajeshwar Prasad	Indian National Congress
1957	Brajeshwar Prasad	Indian National Congress
1962	Brajeshwar Prasad	Indian National Congress
1967	Ram Dhani Das	
1971	Ishwar Chaudhary	Bharatiya Jana Sangh
1977	Ishwar Chaudhary	Janata Party
1980	Ramswaroop Ram	Indian National Congress (I)
1984	Ramswaroop Ram	Indian National Congress
1989	Ishwar Chaudhary	Janata Dal
1991	Rajesh Kumar	Janata Dal
1996	Bhagwati Devi	Janata Dal
1998	Krishna Kumar Choudhary	Bharatiya Janata Party
1999	Ramji Manjhi	Bharatiya Janata Party
2004	Rajesh Kumar Manjhi	Rashtriya Janata Dal
2009	Hari Manjhi	Bharatiya Janata Party
2014	Hari Manjhi	Bharatiya Janata Party
2019	Vijay Manjhi	Janata Dal (United)
2024	Jitan Ram Manjhi	Hindustani Awam Morcha

== Election results ==
=== 2024 ===
2024 Indian general elections: Gaya
Party	Candidate	Votes	%	±%
HAM(S)	Jitan Ram Manjhi	494,960	51.36	+18.50
RJD	Kumar Sarvjeet	3,93,148	40.80	
NOTA	None of the above	17,288	1.79	
Majority		1,01,812	10.56	
Turnout		9,64,870	52.98	−3.20
HAM(S) gain from JD(U)		Swing		

=== 2019 ===
2019 Indian general elections: Gaya
Party	Candidate	Votes	%	±%
JD(U)	Vijay Manjhi	467,007	48.79	+32.51
HAM(S)	Jitan Ram Manjhi	3,14,581	32.86	+32.86
NOTA	None of the above	30,030	3.14	+0.78
JDR	Vijay Kumar Chaudhari	23,462	2.45	+2.45
API	Shiv Shankar	20,464	2.14	+2.14
Majority		1,52,426	15.93	+1.66
Turnout		9,57,654	56.18	+2.26
JD(U) gain from BJP		Swing		

=== 2014 ===
2014 Indian general elections: Gaya
Party	Candidate	Votes	%	±%
BJP	Hari Manjhi	326,230	40.30	
RJD	Ramji Manjhi	2,10,726	26.03	
JD(U)	Jitan Ram Manjhi	1,31,828	16.28	
JMM	Ashok Kumar	36,863	4.55	
IND	Dr. Dev Kumar Choudhary	19,651	2.43	+2.43
Majority		1,15,504	14.27	
Turnout		8,09,587	53.92	
BJP hold		Swing		

=== 2009 ===
2009 Indian general election: Gaya
Party	Candidate	Votes	%	±%
BJP	Hari Manjhi	246,255	43.65	
RJD	Ramji Manjhi	1,83,802	32.58	
INC	Sanjiv Prasad Toni	64,902	11.50	
BSP	Kalawati Devi	22,854	4.05	
CPI(ML)L	Niranjan Kumar	6,704	1.19	
Independent	8 Independent Candidates	26,835	4.76	
Others	3 Other Party Candidates	12,831	2.27	
Majority		62,453	11.07	
Turnout				
Swing to BJP from RJD		Swing		

=== 2004 ===
2004 Indian general election: Gaya
Party	Candidate	Votes	%	±%
RJD	Rajesh Kumar Manjhi	464,829	52.62	
BJP	Balbir Chand	3,61,895	40.97	
BSP	Shakti Raj	18,184	2.06	
CPI	Janki Paswan	16,959	1.92	
CPI(ML)L	Niranjan Kumar	8,046	0.91	
Independent	4 Independent Candidates	8,504	0.96	
Others	3 Other Party Candidates	4,986	0.56	
Majority		1,02,934	11.65	
Turnout				
Swing to RJD from BJP		Swing		

=== 1999 ===
1999 Indian general election: Gaya
Party	Candidate	Votes	%	±%
BJP	Ramji Manjhi	319,530	50.21	
RJD	Rajesh Kumar	2,98,747	46.94	
CPI(ML)L	Niranjan Kumar	9,627	1.51	
JP	Mahavir Ram	3,037	0.48	
Ajeya Bharat Party	Ram Pravesh Paswan	2,476	0.39	
NCP	Jagdish Prasad	1,308	0.21	
Independent	Gaya Paswan	1,012	0.16	
Independent	Jangi Paswan	713	0.11	
Majority		20,783	3.27	
Turnout		6,47,985	61.33	
BJP hold		Swing		

=== 1998 ===
1998 Indian general election: Gaya
Party	Candidate	Votes	%	±%
BJP	Krishna Kumar Chaudhary	303,225	43.50	
RJD	Bhagwati Devi	2,65,779	38.13	
JD	Rajesh Kumar	1,15,141	16.52	
CPI	Janki Paswan	7,707	1.11	
Ajeya Bharat Party	Ravindra Ram	2,186	0.31	
Independent	Ram Pati Ram	1,571	0.23	
Independent	Ram Prasad	1,484	0.21	
Majority		37,446	5.37	
Turnout		7,09,506	67.25	
Swing to BJP from JD		Swing		

=== 1996 ===
1996 Indian general election: Gaya
Party	Candidate	Votes	%	±%
JD	Bhagwati Devi	294,084	46.61	
BJP	Krishna Kumar Choudhary	2,34,461	37.16	
INC	Ram Sawroop Ram	78,347	12.42	
BSP	Surendar Das	9,770	1.55	
CPI(ML)L	Niranjan Kumar	4,951	0.78	
AIIC(T)	G. S. Ramchandar Das	260	0.04	
Independent	13 Independent Candidates	9,010	1.41	
Majority		59,623	9.45	
Turnout				
JD hold		Swing		

=== 1991 ===
1991 Indian general election: Gaya
Party	Candidate	Votes	%	±%
JD	Rajesh Kumar	308,077	50.40	
INC	Jitan Ram Manjhi	2,54,282	41.60	
BJP	Nagia Devi	31,763	5.20	
IPF	Niranjan Kumar	8,213	1.34	
BSP	Surendra Das	2,249	0.37	
INS(SCS)	Urmila Paswan	1,492	0.24	
JP	Maydhavi Qirti	1,003	0.16	
Doordarshi Party	Vilas Manjhi	296	0.05	
Independent	6 Independent Candidates	3,852	0.64	
Majority		53,795	8.80	
Turnout				
JD hold		Swing		

=== 1989 ===
1989 Indian general election: Gaya
Party	Candidate	Votes	%	±%
JD	Inswar Chaudhary	390,200	58.63	
CPI	Janki Paswan	1,37,277	20.63	
INC	Ram Swaroop Ram	1,22,917	18.47	
Independent	4 Independent Candidates	9,223	1.38	
Others	3 Other Party Candidates	5,874	0.88	
Majority		2,52,923	38.00	
Turnout				
Swing to JD from INC		Swing		

=== 1984 ===
1984 Indian general election: Gaya
Party	Candidate	Votes	%	±%
INC	Ram Swaroop Ram	234,195	43.98	
BJP	Ishwar Chaudhary	1,49,760	28.13	
LKD	Rajesh Kumar	1,35,428	25.43	
INC(J)	Nathuni Ram	3,166	0.59	
Independent	9 Independent Candidates	9,924	1.85	
Majority		84,435	15.85	
Turnout				
Swing to INC(I) from INC		Swing		

=== 1980 ===
1980 Indian general election: Gaya
Party	Candidate	Votes	%	±%
INC(I)	Ramswaroop Ram	148,208	38.51	
JP	Ishwar Chaudhary	1,14,281	29.70	
JP(S)	Rajesh Kumar	1,10,664	28.76	
AIFB	Dharmendra Kumar Das	4,300	1.12	
Independent	Nathun Chaudhary	3,907	1.02	
Independent	Kishori Ram	1,902	0.49	
Independent	Kameshwar Ram	1,555	0.40	
Majority		33,927	8.81	
Turnout		3,90,505	55.05	
Swing to INC(I) from JP		Swing		

=== 1977 ===
1977 Indian general election: Gaya
Party	Candidate	Votes	%	±%
JP	Ishwar Chaudhry	341,000	77.60	
INC	Mishri Sada	92,682	21.09	
Independent	Ashok Ram	3,542	0.81	
Shoshit Samaj Dal	Raj Ballabh Paswan	2,230	0.51	
Majority		2,48,318	56.51	
Turnout		4,45,024	69.29	
Swing to JP from ABJS		Swing		

=== 1971 ===
1971 Indian general election: Gaya
Party	Candidate	Votes	%	±%
ABJS	Ishwar Choudhary	111,038	44.85	
INC	Suresh Kumar	1,03,939	41.99	
SSP	Ishwar Das	14,781	5.97	
Hindustani Shoshit Dal	Sukhdeo Prasad	6,990	2.82	
Independent	Ramanand Prasad Mochi	2,853	1.15	
Independent	Chhotu Ram	2,381	0.96	
Independent	Duli Mochi	1,997	0.81	
INC(O)	Ramdhani Das	1,410	0.57	
Independent	Dharam Prasad	1,259	0.51	
Independent	Yasoda Devi	910	0.37	
Majority		7,099	2.86	
Turnout		2,53,735	47.04	
Swing to ABJS from INC		Swing		

=== 1967 ===
1967 Indian general election: Gaya
Party	Candidate	Votes	%	±%
INC	R. Das	70,950	34.70	
SSP	S. Prasad	36,962	18.08	
ABJS	I. Chaudhry	36,535	17.87	
Independent	R. R. R. Azad	32,252	15.77	
PSP	R. R. Ram	18,973	9.28	
SWA	A. R. Manjhi	8,802	4.30	
Majority		33,988	16.62	
Turnout		2,17,255	44.81	
INC hold		Swing		

=== 1962 ===
1962 Indian general election: Gaya
Party	Candidate	Votes	%	±%
INC	Brajeshwar Prasad	69,933	43.49	
SWA	K. Brijkishore Pd. Singh	51,135	31.80	
PSP	Madan Mohan Singh	16,963	10.55	
Socialist	Parsuram Singh	14,423	8.97	
ABJS	Akhileshwar Pd. Singh	8,352	5.19	
Majority		18,798	11.69	
Turnout		1,68,595	49.96	
INC hold		Swing		

=== 1957 ===
1957 Indian general election: Gaya
Party	Candidate	Votes	%	±%
INC	Brajshwar Prasad	57,927	47.87	
PSP	Rameshwar Prasad Jadav	24,658	20.38	
Independent	Ajodhya Prasad	16,170	13.36	
Independent	Radha Mohan Prasad	14,284	11.80	
ABJS	Gauri Shankar Sinha	7,973	6.59	
CNSPJP	Kumar Fateh Singh	0	0.00	
Majority		33,269	27.49	
Turnout		1,21,012	40.71	
INC win (new seat)				

== See also ==
- Gaya district
- List of constituencies of the Lok Sabha
