= Sanjay Kumar Gupta (RJD politician) =

Indian politician

Member of the Bihar Legislative Assembly
- In office 2020 – 14 November 2025
- Preceded by: Sunita Singh Chauhan, JD(U)
- Succeeded by: Amit Ranu, LJP(RV)
- Constituency: Belsand

Personal details
- Born: 2/10/1968 Sheohar
- Party: RJD
- Occupation: Politician

Sanjay Kumar Gupta is an Indian politician from Sitamarhi Bihar and a member of the Bihar Legislative Assembly. Sanjay Kumar Gupta won the Belsand on the RJD ticket in the 2020 Bihar Legislative Assembly election and also won from Sheohar for periods 2003 to 2004 and 2005 to 2010 from Belsand. In 2020 Gupta won for third time as M.L.A.
