= Manishankar Pandey =

Indian politician

Manishankar Pandey (born 20 October 1950) is an Indian politician from the state of Uttar Pradesh. Pandey has completed his BA, MA & LLB from Banaras Hindu University. He represented the Uttar Pradesh Legislative council from 1989 to 1995. He was active in the Indian National Congress Party for more than 45 years from the 1960s to 2018. In 2018, Manishankar Pandey left Indian National Congress Party for joining Lok Janshakti Party. Ram Vilas Paswan appointed Manishankar Pandey as state president for Uttar Pradesh Lok Jan Shakti Party wing the moment he joined the party. During the split of Lok Jan Shakti Party, Pandey stood with the Chirag Paswan faction. Now, Manishankar Pandey is acting as State President for the Uttar Pradesh Lok Janshakti Party (Ram Vilas) wing.
