= Ramji Manjhi =

Indian politician

Member of Parliament, Lok Sabha
- In office 1999-2004
- Preceded by: Krishna Kumar Chaudhari
- Succeeded by: Rajesh Kumar Manjhi
- Constituency: Gaya, Bihar

Personal details
- Born: 3 January 1954 (age 72) Amakuan Tola Izmail, Gaya, Bihar
- Party: Bharatiya Janata Party

Ramji Manjhi is an Indian politician. He was elected to the Lok Sabha, lower house of the Parliament of India from Gaya, Bihar in 1999 as a member of the Bharatiya Janata Party.
