= Amit Ranu =

Indian politician

Member of Bihar Legislative Assembly
- Incumbent
- Assumed office 14 November 2025
- Preceded by: Sanjay Gupta
- Constituency: Belsand

Personal details
- Born: 15 October 1992 (age 33) Baikunthpuri, Muzaffarpur, Bihar
- Party: Lok Janshakti Party (Ram Vilas)
- Spouse: Married (name not publicly known)
- Parent: Pradeep Kumar Singh (father)
- Education: Intermediate, L. S. College, Muzaffarpur, Patna University
- Occupation: Politician, Businessman

Amit Ranu (born 15 October 1992) is an Indian politician and businessman. He is the youngest Member of the Bihar Legislative Assembly from Lok Janshakti Party (Ram Vilas) representing Belsand constituency since 2025.

== Early life and education ==
Amit Ranu was born on 15 October 1992 in Baikunthpuri, Muzaffarpur, Bihar. His father is Pradeep Kumar Singh. He completed his Intermediate education from L. S. College, Muzaffarpur under Patna University.

== Political career ==
Amit Ranu contested the 2025 Bihar Legislative Assembly election from Belsand constituency and won, defeating incumbent MLA Sanjay Gupta by 22,685 votes, receiving 82,076 votes. He represents the Lok Janshakti Party (Ram Vilas) in the Bihar Legislative Assembly.

== Controversies ==
In 2025, he received threats over the phone, and the accused was later arrested by the police.

== Personal life ==
Amit Ranu is married, but his spouse's name is not publicly known. His father is Pradeep Kumar Singh.

== Electoral performance ==
Year	Constituency	Party	Votes	Result	Position
2025	Belsand	Lok Janshakti Party (Ram Vilas)	82,076	Won	1st
