= Barachatti Assembly constituency =

Assembly constituency in Bihar, India

Coordinates: 24.51°N 85.01°E

Barachatti
- Constituency No. 228 for the Bihar Legislative Assembly

Constituency details
- Country: India
- Region: East India
- State: Bihar
- District: Gaya
- Lok Sabha constituency: Gaya
- Established: 1957
- Total electors: 310,945
- Reservation: SC

Member of Legislative Assembly
- 18th Bihar Legislative Assembly
- Incumbent Jyoti Devi
- Party: HAM(S)
- Alliance: NDA
- Elected year: 2025
- Preceded by: Samta Devi, RJD

Barachatti Assembly constituency is an assembly constituency for Bihar Legislative Assembly in Gaya district of Bihar, India. It comes under Gaya (Lok Sabha constituency).

== Members of the Legislative Assembly ==
Year	Member	Party
1957	Shreedhar Narain	Praja Socialist Party
1962	Mustaque Ali Khan	Swatantra Party
1967	Vishnu Charan Bharti	Indian National Congress
1969	Bhagwati Devi	Samyukta Socialist Party
1972	Mohan Ram	Indian National Congress
1977	Bhagwati Devi	Janata Party
1980	G. S. Ramchandra Das	Indian National Congress
1985	G. S. Ramchandra Das	Indian National Congress
1990	Umesh Singh	Indian People's Front
1995	Bhagwati Devi	Janata Dal
1996^	Jitan Ram Manjhi	Janata Dal
2000	Bhagwati Devi	Rashtriya Janata Dal
2003^	Samta Devi	Rashtriya Janata Dal
2005	Vijay Manjhi	Rashtriya Janata Dal
2005	Jitan Ram Manjhi	Janata Dal (United)
2010	Jyoti Devi	Janata Dal (United)
2015	Samta Devi	Rashtriya Janata Dal
2020	Jyoti Devi	Hindustani Awam Morcha
2025	Jyoti Devi	Hindustani Awam Morcha

== Election results ==
=== 2025 ===
2025 Bihar Legislative Assembly election: Barachatti
Party	Candidate	Votes	%	±%
HAM(S)	Jyoti Devi	108,271	47.44	+8.23
RJD	Tanushree Kumari	99,378	43.54	+7.75
JSP	Hemant Kumar	3,967	1.74	
BSP	G S Ramchandra Das	3,150	1.38	−3.88
Peoples Party of India (Democratic)	Manoj Paswan	2,661	1.17	+0.2
NOTA	None of the above	4,329	1.9	−0.14
Majority		8,893	3.9	+0.48
Turnout		228,235	73.4	+12.65
HAM(S) hold		Swing		

=== 2020 ===
2020 Bihar Legislative Assembly election: Barachatti
Party	Candidate	Votes	%	±%
HAM(S)	Jyoti Devi	72,491	39.21	
RJD	Samta Devi	66,173	35.79	−9.63
LJP	Renuka Devi	11,244	6.08	−27.09
BSP	Rita Devi	9,721	5.26	+0.14
Independent	Arjun Bhuiyan	3,836	2.07	
Independent	Puniya Devi	3,778	2.04	
JAP(L)	Bal Kunwar Manjhi	3,127	1.69	
Independent	Shivcharan Manjhi	2,962	1.6	
BMP	Parmeshwar Paswan	1,893	1.02	−0.46
Peoples Party of India (Democratic)	Shiv Shankar Kumar	1,802	0.97	
NOTA	None of the above	3,767	2.04	−2.65
Majority		6,318	3.42	−8.83
Turnout		184,902	60.75	+4.41
HAM(S) gain from RJD		Swing		

=== 2015 ===
2015 Bihar Legislative Assembly election: Barachatti
Party	Candidate	Votes	%	±%
RJD	Samta Devi	70,909	45.42	
LJP	Sudha Devi	51,783	33.17	
BSP	Harendra Prasad	7,999	5.12	
Independent	Mukesh Kumar	3,778	2.42	
RPI	Sarju Parsad	3,287	2.11	
Samras Samaj Party	Ramotar Manjhi	2,627	1.68	
CPI(ML)L	Sreechand Das	2,408	1.54	
BMP	Dileep Paswan	2,303	1.48	
NOTA	None of the above	7,328	4.69	
Majority		19,126	12.25	
Turnout		156,134	56.34	
