= Samta Devi =

Indian politician

Member of the Bihar Legislative Assembly
- In office 2015–2020
- Preceded by: Jyoti Devi
- Succeeded by: Jyoti Devi
- Constituency: Barachatti

Personal details
- Born: 1972; Bihar, India
- Political party: Rashtriya Janata Dal
- Occupation: Politician

Samta Devi (born 1972) is an Indian politician from Bihar. She is a former member of the Bihar Legislative Assembly from Barachatti Assembly constituency, which is reserved for Scheduled Caste community in Gaya district. She last won the 2015 Bihar Legislative Assembly election representing the Rashtriya Janata Dal.

== Early life and education ==
Devi is from Barachatti, Gaya district, Bihar. She married Naval Kishor Lal. She studied her Intermediate at Vishwanath Singh College, Sobh Barachatti and later discontinued her studies.

== Career ==
Devi first became an MLA from Barachatti Assembly constituency representing Rashtriya Janata Dal, winning the by election in 2003 which was caused due to the death of sitting MLA, Bhagwati Devi. In 2010, she lost to Janata Dal (United) candidate Jyoti Devi by 23,746 votes. She regained the seat after 12 years, winning the 2015 Bihar Legislative Assembly election. In 2015, she polled 70,909 votes and defeated her nearest rival, Sudha Devi of the Lok Janshakti Party, by a margin of 19,126 votes. She lost the seat in the 2020 Bihar Legislative Assembly election to Jyoti Devi of Hindustani Awam Morcha by a margin of 6,318 votes. She polled 66,173 votes against 72,491 votes polled by Jyoti Devi.
