= Nayantara (disambiguation) =

Nayantara or Nayanthara (born 1984) is an Indian film actress.

Nayantara or Nayanthara may also refer to:

- Nayantara (Marathi actress) (1950–2014), Indian actress
- Nayantara (TV series), a Bengali daily soap opera
- Nayantara Sahgal (born 1927) Indian writer
- Nayan Tara Das (1915–?), Indian politician
- Nayantara (plant) or Catharanthus roseus
