= Manish Kumar =

Indian politician

Member of Bihar Legislative Assembly
- Incumbent
- Assumed office 2009
- Preceded by: Bhudeo Choudhary
- Constituency: Dhoraiya

Personal details
- Born: 22 December 1978 (age 47)
- Party: Janata Dal (United)
- Education: Delhi University (PGDSA)

Manish Kumar (born 22 December 1978) is an Indian politician and a member of the Bihar Legislative Assembly. He is a member of the Janata Dal (United) and has been the representative of the Dhauraiya constituency in the Bihar Legislative Assembly since 2009.

== Early life and education ==
Manish Kumar was born in the town of Nathnagar, Bhagalpur district, Bihar. He has a postgraduate diploma from Delhi University.

== Political career ==
Manish Kumar entered politics while still a student in 1993. In the 2009 Indian general election, Bhudeo Choudhary of the Janata Dal (United) was elected as a member of parliament from the Jamui constituency. Choudhary had previously been the representative of the Dhauraiya constituency in the Bihar Legislative Assembly, and had to forfeit his seat. In the following by-election for the state assembly constituency, Kumar stood as the candidate from the Janata Dal (United) and was elected to the Bihar Legislative Assembly. He was re-elected to the assembly constituency for two terms in the 2010 Bihar Legislative Assembly election and the 2015 Bihar Legislative Assembly election.

== Controversies ==
=== Basabitta village ===
In January 2020, during a visit to the Basabitta village in the Dhauraiya constituency, villagers laid down a gherao (encirclement) around Manish Kumar's convoy to protest the lack of basic facilities in the village. The villagers were airing grievances that work which began 10 years ago have remained incomplete and accused the legislator of only remembering his constituents before elections. Among the issues brought up were the condition of the only village school which was in a run down state, the lack of a proper bridge over a drain in front of the school and the incomplete construction of a bridge near a river diversion, where soil was poured to temporarily prevent the flow of water but no construction had proceeded for years which restricted the flow of water to farms and had ruined crops.

=== Rickshaw driver abuse ===
In September 2020, an image of Manish Kumar forcing a rickshaw driver to perform sit-ups as punishment went viral on social media. The image caused outrage against the legislator with accusations of abuse of power. The legislator however stated that he was imparting practical knowledge to the driver who he accused of causing a traffic jam on the road and that he had saved his life from a crowd on the road.
