= Shambhavi Choudhary =

Indian politician

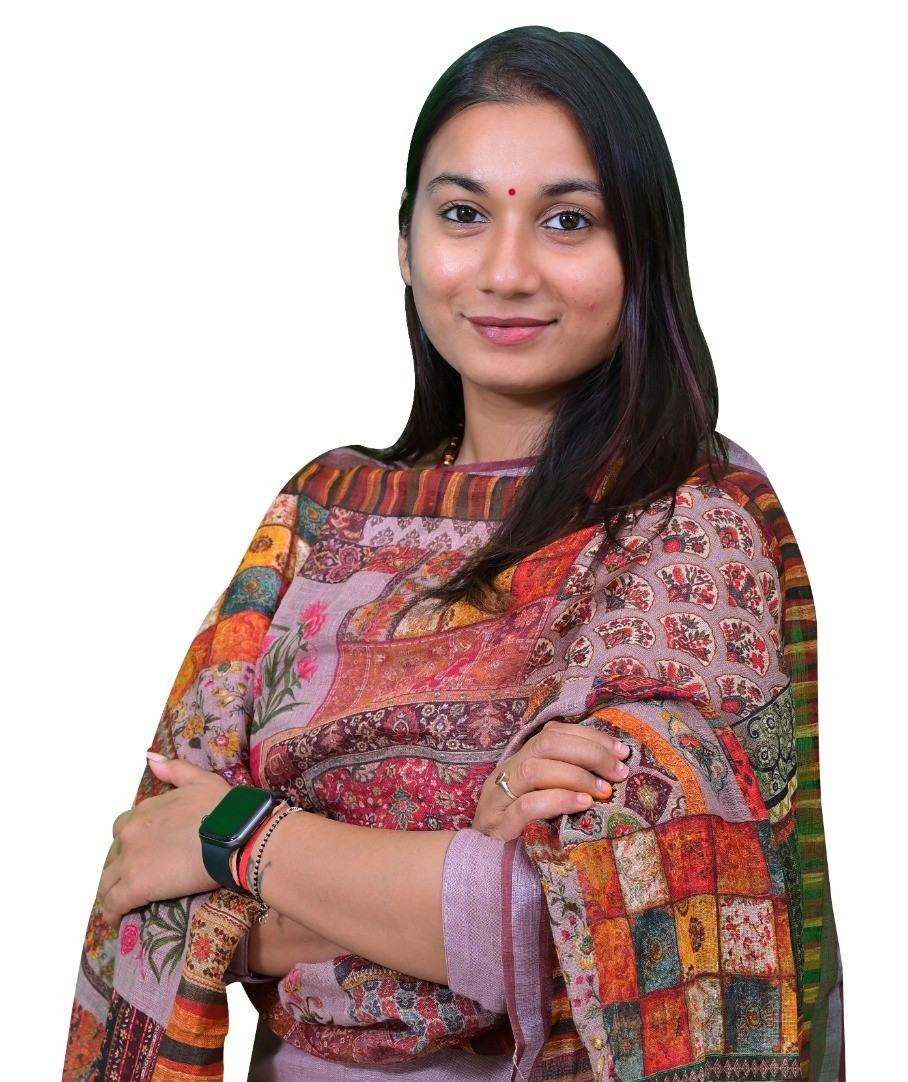

Member of Parliament, Lok Sabha
- Incumbent
- Assumed office 4 June 2024
- Preceded by: Prince Raj
- Constituency: Samastipur

Personal details
- Born: 15 June 1998 (age 28)
- Party: Lok Janshakti Party (Ram Vilas)
- Spouse: Saayan Kunal
- Relations: Kishore Kunal (father-in-law)
- Parent: Ashok Choudhary (father)
- Education: B.A. & M.A. (sociology)
- Alma mater: • Notre Dame Academy, Patna • Lady Shri Ram College for Women(LSR) • Delhi School of Economics (DSE)

Shambhavi Choudhary (born 15 June 1998) is an Indian politician from Bihar. She is a Member of Parliament from Samastipur Lok Sabha constituency, which is reserved for Scheduled Caste community and represented the Lok Janshakti Party (Ram Vilas). She is one of the youngest MPs in the 18th Lok Sabha.

== Early life and education ==
Shambhavi is from Patna, Bihar. She is the daughter of Ashok Choudhary, who was the cabinet minister for the Building Construction Department of the Bihar government, currently cabinet minister of Rural works department of Bihar government and the National General Secretary of Janata Dal (United).

Shambhavi was educated at Notre Dame Academy, Patna. She then completed her bachelor's degree in sociology at Lady Shri Ram College for Women, Delhi, in 2019 and later earned her master's degree in sociology from the Delhi School of Economics in 2022.

Shambhavi married Sayan Kunal, son of Acharya Kishore Kunal, in 2022.

== Literary works ==
Shambhavi's book Bihar ke Gandhi Nitish Kumar, which she co authored with Ashok Choudhary was published by Prabhat Prakashan and it became a bestseller. She also translated the Constitution of India into Maithili. On the occasion of its release in Delhi, she met the Prime Minister Narendra Modi, who congratulated her on her translation and enquired about the development of her constituency.

== Political career ==
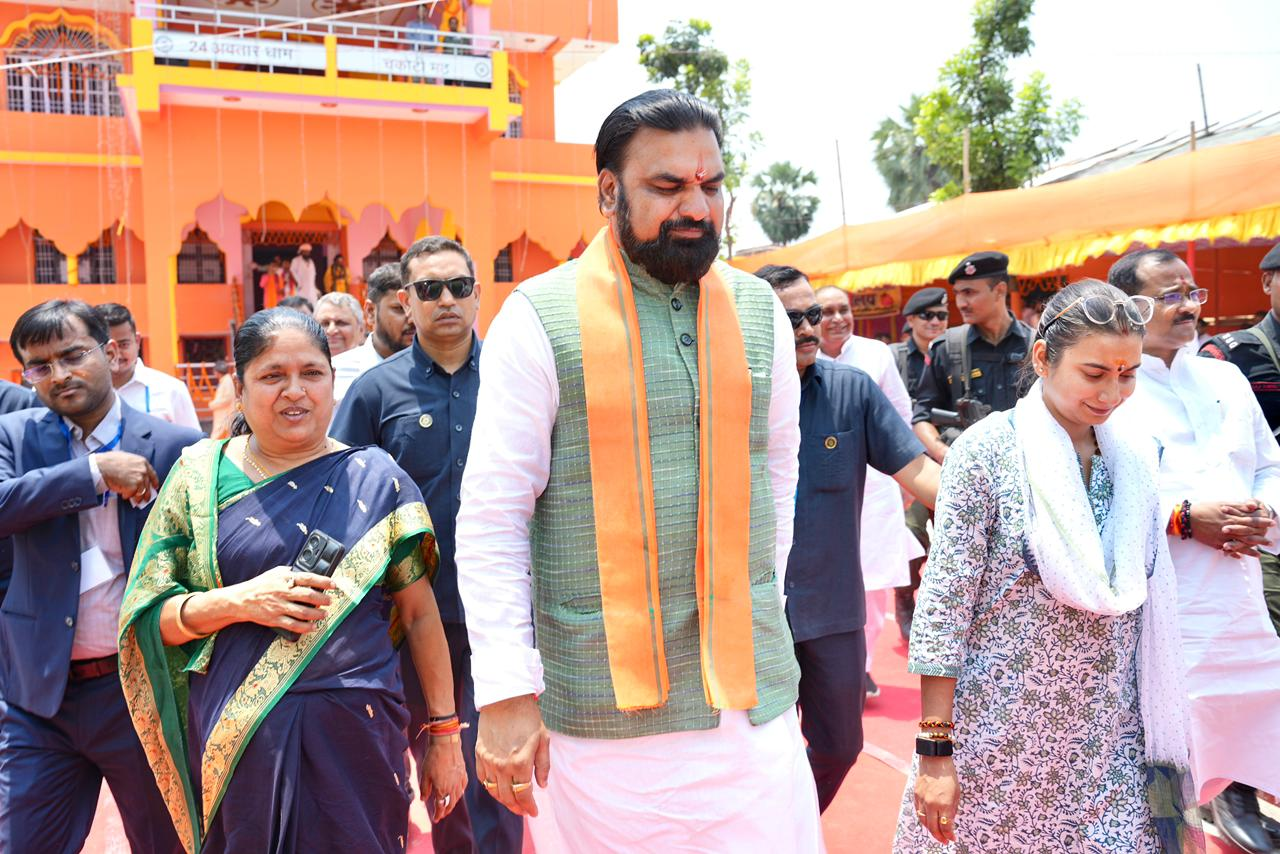
Shambhavi participating in consecration ceremony and Vishnu Mahayajna with CM Samrat Chaudhary and Samastipur MLA Ashwamedh Devi.

Shambhavi has been elected as a Member of Parliament from Samastipur Lok Sabha constituency in the 2024 Indian general election in Bihar. It has four Vidhana Sabha segments in Samastipur district and two in Darbhanga district. She polled 579,786 votes and defeated her nearest rival, Sunny Hazari of the Indian National Congress, by a margin of 187,251 votes.

In February 2025, she met home minister Amit Shah, along with her husband, a social worker, and discussed about development issues of her constituency.

== Social works ==
Choudhary oversees Gyan Niketan School, a school in Patna that actively supports female education.
