= Dhoraiya Assembly constituency =

Constituency of the Bihar legislative assembly in India

- Constituency No. 160 for the Bihar Legislative Assembly

Constituency details
- Country: India
- Region: East India
- State: Bihar
- District: Banka
- Established: 1951
- Total electors: 307,230

Member of Legislative Assembly
- 18th Bihar Legislative Assembly
- Incumbent Manish Kumar
- Party: JD(U)
- Alliance: NDA
- Elected year: 2025

Dhoraiya Assembly constituency alternatively Dhauraiya or Dhuraiya Assembly constituency is one of 243 constituencies of legislative assembly of Bihar. It is part of Banka Lok Sabha constituency along with other assembly constituencies viz. Amarpur, Katoria, Belhar and Banka.

== Overview ==
Dhoraiya comprises CD Blocks Rajoun & Dhoraiya.

== Members of the Legislative Assembly ==
Election	Name	Party
1952	Pashupati Singh	Indian National Congress
1957	Maulana Saminuddin	Indian National Congress
1962	Maulana Saminuddin	Indian National Congress
1967	S. Mandal	Indian National Congress
1969	Ram Chanura Bhanu	Independent politician
1972	Naresh Das	Communist Party of India
1977	Naresh Das	Communist Party of India
1980	Naresh Das	Communist Party of India
1985	Ramroop Harijan	Indian National Congress
1990	Naresh Das	Communist Party of India
1995	Naresh Das	Communist Party of India
2000	Bhudeo Choudhary	Samata Party
2005	Bhudeo Choudhary	Janata Dal (United)
2005	Bhudeo Choudhary	Janata Dal (United)
2010	Manish Kumar	Janata Dal (United)
2015	Manish Kumar	Janata Dal (United)
2020	Bhudeo Choudhary	Rashtriya Janata Dal
2025	Manish Kumar	Janata Dal (United)

== Election results ==
=== 2025 ===
2025 Bihar Legislative Assembly election: Dhoraiya
Party	Candidate	Votes	%	±%
JD(U)	Manish Kumar	113,011	51.21	+9.04
RJD	Tribhuwan Prasad	90,585	41.05	−2.81
JSP	Suman Paswan	6,284	2.85	
NOTA	None of the above	3,025	1.37	−0.42
Majority		22,426	10.16	+8.47
Turnout		220,693	71.83	+10.88
JD(U) gain from RJD		Swing		

=== 2020 ===
2020 Bihar Legislative Assembly election: Dhoraiya
Party	Candidate	Votes	%	±%
RJD	Bhudeo Choudhary	79,324	43.86	
JD(U)	Manish Kumar	76,264	42.17	−2.24
LJP	Dipak Kumar Paswan	4,108	2.27	
RLSP	Shiv Shankar	3,157	1.75	−27.08
Independent	Ranjeet Sharma	3,108	1.72	
JAP(L)	Prof. Bilkshan Ravidas	2,959	1.64	
Independent	Puja Devi	2,256	1.25	
Independent	Sadanand Tanti	2,245	1.24	
Vanchit Samaj Party	Mritunjay Kumar Ray	1,813	1.0	
NOTA	None of the above	3,233	1.79	−1.97
Majority		3,060	1.69	−13.89
Turnout		180,867	60.95	+3.36
RJD gain from JD(U)		Swing		

=== 2015 ===
2015 Bihar Legislative Assembly election: Dhauraiya
Party	Candidate	Votes	%	±%
JD(U)	Manish Kumar	68,858	44.41	
RLSP	Bhudeo Choudhary	44,704	28.83	
CPI	Munilal Paswan	24,501	15.8	
NOTA	n/a	5,836	3.76	
Sarvajan Kalyan Loktantrik Party	Vijay Paswan	3,345	2.16	
BSP	Pushpalata Kumari	2,642	1.7	
Bhartiya Dalit Party	Neelu Devi	2,319	1.5	
Garib Janta Dal (Secular)	Anil Rajak	1,489	0.96	
NOTA	None of the above	5,836	3.76	
Majority		24,154	15.58	
Turnout		155,039	57.59	

== See also ==
- List of Assembly constituencies of Bihar
