= Brahmadev Anand Paswan =

Indian politician

Brahmadev Anand Paswan is an Indian politician. He was elected to the Rajya Sabha (upper house of the parliament of India) on 28 May 1993, from the Bihar Legislative Assembly constituency. He represented the Janata Dal at the time. According to one narrative, it was Paswan's poetry that attracted the attention of the Janata Dal chief Laloo Prasad Yadav and enabled his election to the Rajya Sabha. His tenure in the Rajya Sabha lasted from 1 June 1993 to 2 April 1994.

Paswan became national chief patron of Indian National Trade Union Congress, Paswan was named as the Bahujan Samaj Party candidate for the Jamui Lok Sabha seat in the 2014 general election.
