= Hari Manjhi =

Indian politician

Member of Parliament, Lok Sabha
- In office 2009–2019
- Preceded by: Rajesh Kumar Manjhi
- Succeeded by: Vijay Kumar Manjhi
- Constituency: Gaya

Member of Bihar Legislative Assembly
- In office 2005–2009
- Preceded by: Phool Chand Manjhi
- Succeeded by: Kumar Sarvjeet
- Constituency: Bodh Gaya

Personal details
- Born: 28 January 1963 (age 63) Bishunganj, Gaya
- Party: Bharatiya Janata Party
- Spouse: Karmi Devi (m. 1978)
- Children: 2 sons, 2 daughters
- Parent: Mastan Manjhi (father)
- Education: Under Matriculate

Hari Manjhi (born 28 January 1963) is an Indian politician who formerly represented Gaya Lok Sabha seat in the Parliament of India. He was also a member of the 15th Lok Sabha. He is a leader of the Bharatiya Janata Party.

== Positions held ==
- 2005-09 Member, Bihar Legislative Assembly
- 2009 Elected to 15th Lok Sabha
- 31 Aug. 2009 Member, Committee on Labour

Member, Consultative Committee, Ministry of Food Processing Industries Chairman, Vigilance and Monitoring Committee, Ministry of Rural Development, Govt. of India, Gaya

- May, 2014 Re-elected to 16th Lok Sabha (2nd term)
- 1 Sep. 2014 onwards Member, Committee on Absence of Members from the Sittings of the House

Member, Standing Committee on Labour Member, Consultative Committee, Ministry of Coal
