= Bodh Gaya Assembly constituency =

Assembly constituency in Bihar, India

Coordinates: 24.7°N 85.0°E

- Constituency No. 229- for the Bihar Legislative Assembly

Constituency details
- Country: India
- Region: East India
- State: Bihar
- District: Gaya
- Established: 1957
- Total electors: 329,813

Member of Legislative Assembly
- 18th Bihar Legislative Assembly
- Incumbent Kumar Sarvjeet
- Party: RJD
- Alliance: MGB
- Elected year: 2025

Bodh Gaya Assembly constituency is an assembly constituency and Kumar Sarvjeet is the MLA for Bihar Legislative Assembly in Gaya district of Bihar, India. It comes under Gaya (Lok Sabha constituency).

== Members of the Legislative Assembly ==
Year	Name	Party
1957	Shanti Devi	Indian National Congress
1962	Kuldeep Mahto	Swatantra Party
1967	Rameshwar Manjhi	Indian National Congress
1969	Kali Ram	Bharatiya Jana Sangh
1972	Balik Ram	Communist Party of India
1977	Rajesh Kumar	Janata Party
1980	Balik Ram	Communist Party of India
1985	Rajesh Kumar	Lokdal
1990	Balik Ram	Communist Party of India
1995	Malti Devi	Independent
1998^	G. S. Ramchandra Das	Rashtriya Janata Dal
2000	Jitan Ram Manjhi	Rashtriya Janata Dal
2005	Phoolchand Manjhi	Rashtriya Janata Dal
2005	Hari Manjhi	Bharatiya Janata Party
2009^	Kumar Sarvjeet	Lok Janshakti Party
2010	Shyam Deo Paswan	Bharatiya Janata Party
2015	Kumar Sarvjeet	Rashtriya Janata Dal
2020	Kumar Sarvjeet	Rashtriya Janata Dal
2025	Kumar Sarvjeet	Rashtriya Janata Dal

^by-election

== Election results ==
=== 2025 ===
Bihar Assembly election, 2025: Bodh Gaya
Party	Candidate	Votes	%	±%
RJD	Kumar Sarvjeet	100,236	43.38	▲1.54
LJP(RV)	Shyamdeo Paswan	99,355	43.0	
Independent	Nandlal Kumar	10,181	4.41	
JSP	Lakshman Manjhi	4,024	1.74	
Vikas Vanchit Insan Party	Ashok Kumar Paswan	3,675	1.59	
Independent	Ramswrup Rishiyasan	3,327	1.44	
NOTA	None of the above	5,960	2.58	▲1.29
Majority		881	0.38	▼2.06
Turnout		231,073	70.06	▲8.73
RJD hold		Swing		

=== 2020 ===
Bihar Assembly election, 2020: Bodh Gaya
Party	Candidate	Votes	%	±%
RJD	Kumar Sarvjeet	80,926	41.84	−8.14
BJP	Hari Manjhi	76,218	39.4	+7.85
RLSP	Ajay Paswan	9,311	4.81	
Independent	Pramila Kumari	3,593	1.86	
Moolniwasi Samaj Party	Satyendra Kumar	3,438	1.78	
Independent	Ravindra Rajwanshi	2,546	1.32	
NCP	Suresh Paswan	2,115	1.09	+0.15
Apna Kisan Party	Kailash Bhuiyan	2,062	1.07	
Bahujan Lok Dal	Sanjay Kumar Choudhary	1,998	1.03	
Rashtriya Jan Jan Party	Dilip Kumar Choudhary	1,919	0.99	
NOTA	None of the above	2,500	1.29	−2.2
Majority		4,708	2.44	−15.99
Turnout		193,434	61.33	+4.01
RJD hold		Swing		

=== 2015 ===
2015 Bihar Legislative Assembly election: Bodh Gaya
Party	Candidate	Votes	%	±%
RJD	Sarvajeet Kumar	82,656	49.98	
BJP	Shyamdeo Paswan	52,183	31.55	
Independent	Devendra Manjhi	4,265	2.58	
CPI	Janki Paswan	4,057	2.45	
Independent	Naresh Kumar Bharti	2,872	1.74	
Bharat Bhrashtachar Mitao Party	Sikandra Choudhary	2,439	1.47	
BSP	Sharawan Manjhi	1,750	1.06	
SS	Amod Kumar Paswan	1,742	1.05	
NCP	Deen Dayal Bharati	1,561	0.94	
Garib Janta Dal (Secular)	Satyendra Kumar	1,547	0.94	
NOTA	None of the above	5,772	3.49	
Majority		30,473	18.43	
Turnout		165,385	57.32	
