= Belsand Assembly constituency =

Coordinates: 26°27′N 85°24′E

Belsand
- Constituency No. - for the Bihar Legislative Assembly

Constituency details
- Country: India
- Region: East India
- State: Bihar
- District: Sitamarhi
- Established: 1957
- Total electors: 261,773
- Reservation: None

Member of Legislative Assembly
- 18th Bihar Legislative Assembly
- Incumbent Amit Ranu
- Party: LJP(RV)
- Alliance: NDA
- Elected year: 2025

Belsand is an assembly constituency in Sitamarhi district in the Indian state of Bihar.

== Overview ==
As per Delimitation of Parliamentary and Assembly constituencies Order, 2008, 30. Belsand Assembly constituency is composed of the following: Belsand and Parsauni community development blocks in Sitamarhi district and Tariani Chowk CD Block in Sheohar district.

Belsand Assembly constituency is part of 4. Sheohar (Lok Sabha constituency).

== Members of the Legislative Assembly ==
Year	Name	Party
1957	Ramanand Singh	Praja Socialist Party
1962	Ramanand Singh	Praja Socialist Party
1967	Chandreshwar Prasad Singh	Indian National Congress
1969	Ramanand Singh	Praja Socialist Party
1972	Ram Surat Singh	Indian National Congress
1977	Raghuvansh Prasad Singh	Janata Party
1980	Raghuvansh Prasad Singh	Janata Party (Secular)
1985	Raghuvansh Prasad Singh	Lokdal
1990	Digvijay Pratap Singh	Indian National Congress
1995	Raghuvansh Prasad Singh	Janata Dal
1996^	Brishin Patel	Samata Party
2000	Ram Swarth Rai	Rashtriya Janata Dal
2005	Sunita Singh Chauhan	Lok Janshakti Party
2005	Sanjay Kumar Gupta	Rashtriya Janata Dal
2010	Sunita Singh Chauhan	Janata Dal (United)
2015	Sunita Singh Chauhan	Janata Dal (United)
2020	Sanjay Kumar Gupta	Rashtriya Janata Dal
2025	Amit Ranu	Lok Janshakti Party (Ram Vilas)

== Election results ==
=== 2025 ===
2025 Bihar Legislative Assembly election: Belsand
Party	Candidate	Votes	%	±%
LJP(RV)	Amit Ranu	82,076	44.83	
RJD	Sanjay Kumar Gupta	59,391	32.44	▼3.38
JSP	Arpna Singh	19,025	10.39	
BSP	Rana Randhir Singh Chouhan	7,600	4.15	
Rashtriya Jansambhavna Party	Ambika Sah	2,559	1.4	
Janshakti Janta Dal	Vikash Kumar	2,284	1.25	
RLJP	Shamim Alam	1,706	0.93	
NOTA	None of the above	6,110	3.34	▲0.32
Majority		22,685	12.39	▲2.41
Turnout		183,072	69.94	▲17.46
LJP(RV) gain from RJD		Swing		

=== 2020 ===
2020 Bihar Legislative Assembly election: Belsad
Party	Candidate	Votes	%	±%
RJD	Sanjay Kumar Gupta	50,001	35.82	
JD(U)	Sunita Singh Chauhan	36,070	25.84	▼1.75
RLSP	Thakur Dharmendra Singh	19,034	13.64	
LJP	Nasir Ahmad	10,699	7.67	▼15.36
Independent	Mahant Narendra Das Mahatyagi	3,268	2.34	
Independent	Lalbabu Sah	3,150	2.26	
JAP(L)	Subodh Kumar Ray	2,488	1.78	
Bhartiya Party (Loktantrik)	Balram Kumar	2,205	1.58	
Independent	Vandana Kumari	2,095	1.5	
Independent	Suresh Baitha	1,504	1.08	
NOTA	None of the above	4,222	3.02	▲1.68
Majority		13,931	9.98	▲5.42
Turnout		139,580	52.48	▲0.48
RJD gain from JD(U)		Swing		

=== 2015 ===
2015 Bihar Legislative Assembly election: Belsand
Party	Candidate	Votes	%	±%
JD(U)	Sunita Singh Chauhan	33,785	27.59	
LJP	Md. Nasir Ahamad	28,210	23.03	
Independent	Baidyanath Prasad	11,366	9.28	
Independent	Angesh Kumar	10,614	8.67	
Independent	Akhilesh Kumar Singh	6,976	5.7	
Independent	Sanjay Kumar	5,480	4.47	
CPI	Shatrughan Sahani	5,063	4.13	
Sarvajan Kalyan Loktantrik Party	Ram Sakal Sahani	3,343	2.73	
BSP	Bindeshwar Ram	2,571	2.1	
Independent	Sanjay Singh	2,481	2.03	
SP	Khushanandan Ray	2,120	1.73	
Independent	Ashok Kumar	2,005	1.64	
Bharatiya Yuva Party (Democratic)	Chandeshwar Das Chanakya	1,425	1.16	
Garib Janta Dal (Secular)	Usha Devi	1,391	1.14	
Bharat Nirman Party	Ramgyan Kumar	1,176	0.96	
Vanchitsamaj Insaaf Party	Md Noor Alam	1,140	0.93	
NOTA	None of the above	1,647	1.34	
Majority		5,575	4.56	
Turnout		122,466	52.0	
