= Vijay Kumar (Bihar politician) =

Member of the 17th Lok Sabha

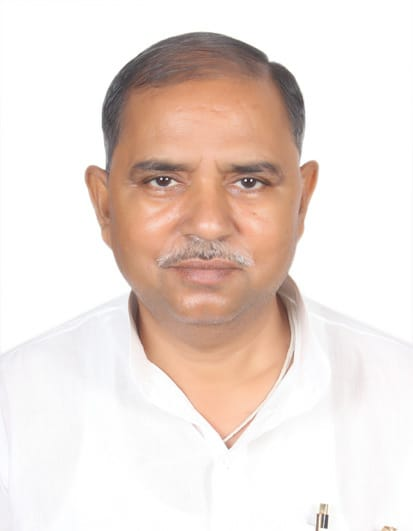

Member of the India Parliament for Gaya
- Preceded by: Hari Manjhi
- Constituency: Gaya

Personal details
- Born: 4 January 1970 (age 56) Khatkachak, Gaya
- Party: Janata Dal (United)
- Spouse: Smt. Devrani Devi
- Children: 4

Vijay Kumar is an Indian politician. He was elected to the Lok Sabha, lower house of the Parliament of India from Gaya in the 2019 Indian general election as member of the ruling Janata Dal (United), part of the National Democratic Alliance. His mother was Bhagwati Devi, a stone-crusher who became an MP in 1996 from Gaya as well.
