= Ramswaroop Ram =

Indian politician

Member of Parliament, Lok Sabha
- In office 1980–1989
- Preceded by: Ishwar Choudhary
- Succeeded by: Ishwar Choudhary
- Constituency: Gaya, Bihar

Personal details
- Born: 4 June 1942
- Died: 2009
- Party: Indian National Congress
- Other political affiliations: Janata Party
- Spouse: Saraswati Swaroop

Ramswaroop Ram was an Indian politician. He was elected to the Lok Sabha, the lower house of the Parliament of India, from Gaya in Bihar, as a member of the Indian National Congress.
