= Bhudeo Choudhary =

Indian politician (born 1960)

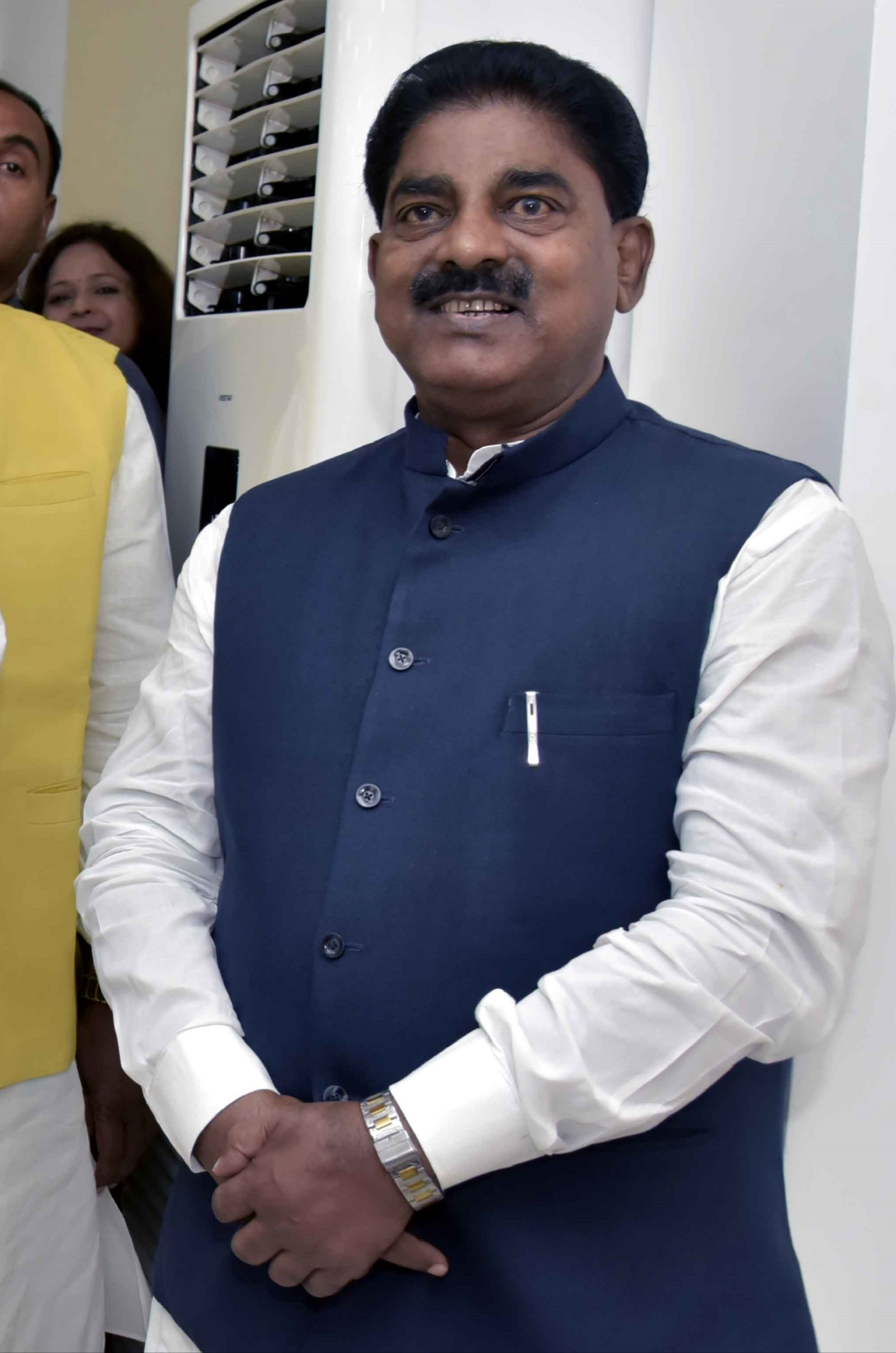

Member of the Bihar Legislative Assembly
- In office 10 November 2020 – 2025
- Preceded by: Manish Kumar
- Succeeded by: Manish Kumar
- Constituency: Dhoraiya

Member of Parliament, Lok Sabha
- In office 2009–2014
- Preceded by: Bhola Manjhi
- Succeeded by: Chirag Paswan
- Constituency: Jamui

Member of Bihar Legislative Assembly
- In office 2000–2009
- Preceded by: Naresh Das
- Succeeded by: Manish Kumar
- Constituency: Dhoraiya

Personal details
- Born: 1 February 1960 (age 66)
- Party: Rashtriya Janata Dal (2020 -Present)
- Other political affiliations: Janata Dal (United) (till 2014); Rashtriya Lok Samata Party (2014-2020)
- Spouse: Indrani Choudhary (m. 1997)

Bhudeo Choudhary (alternatively Bhudev Choudhary; born 1 February 1960) is an Indian politician currently serving as a Member of the Legislative Assembly from the Dhoraiya seat in Bihar representing the Rashtriya Janata Dal and former member of parliament. He has been the state president of the Rashtriya Lok Samata Party in Bihar till September 2020. Prior to the Bihar Assembly Elections 2020, he joined Rashtriya Janata Dal. He has also been the representative of the Dhauraiya constituency in the Bihar Legislative Assembly from 2000 to 2009. Choudhary was elected to the Indian parliament in 2009 for one term as the representative of the Jamui constituency. He is a former member of the Janata Dal (United).

== Political career ==
Bhudeo Choudhary had contested the Dhauraiya constituency of the Bihar Legislative Assembly in 1990 as an independent candidate and in 1995 as the candidate of the Samata Party (now led by Uday Mandal its President). Choudhary was elected as a representative in the legislative assembly for the first time in 2000. He was then a member of the Samata Party and became the representative of the Dhauraiya constituency. After the merger of the Samata Party into the Janata Dal (United), he was re-elected to the seat in the February and October elections of 2005 as the candidate of the Janata Dal (United).

Choudhary was elected to the Indian parliament from the Jamui constituency in the 2009 Indian general election as a member of the Janata Dal (United) and a nominee of the National Democratic Alliance. Following his election, he resigned from his seat in the Bihar Legislative Assembly. He is noted to have criticised the 2011 Union Budget of India with a rhyme stating "If you drive a car, I will tax the street. If you try to sit, I will tax the seat. If you get too cold, I will tax the heat. If you take a walk, I will tax your feet." Choudhary remained as a sitting member of parliament of the Janata Dal (United) till 2014, but the party denied him candidacy to stand for re-election in the 2014 Indian general election.

He contested the Dhauraiya constituency for the sixth time as a candidate of Rashtriya Lok Samata Party in the 2015 Bihar Legislative Assembly election but failed to secure the seat. In 2016, he was nominated as the state president of the Bihar unit of the Rashtriya Lok Samata Party's by the party's national president, Upendra Kushwaha. The nomination was met with dissent in the party from the rebelling faction of Arun Kumar. Choudhary contested the Jamui constituency seat in the 2019 Indian general election but was defeated by Chirag Paswan.

== Controversy ==
=== Land grabbing case ===
Bhudeo Choudhary has been involved in a land grabbing case in Kazichak, Banka district. A first information report (FIR) had been lodged against Choudhary which stated that he had forced the claimant of a property to vacate the premises by threatening him with an unlicensed revolver in the presence of a mob which included police personnel and administrative officers and then demolished the property after attaining possession. The report alleged that documents for the sale of the property were forged with the help of undue influence in favor of his wife, Indrani Choudhary when he was the Member of the Legislative Assembly from the constituency. The report also claimed that a death certificate of the wife of the original owner had been forged to deny her rights to the property after her husband had died. The FIR had named Bhudeo Choudhary, his wife, a deputy collector and over 50 other people, some of whom were unidentified.
