= Notre Dame Academy, Patna =

Coordinates: 25°38′02″N 85°06′29″E

Notre Dame Academy
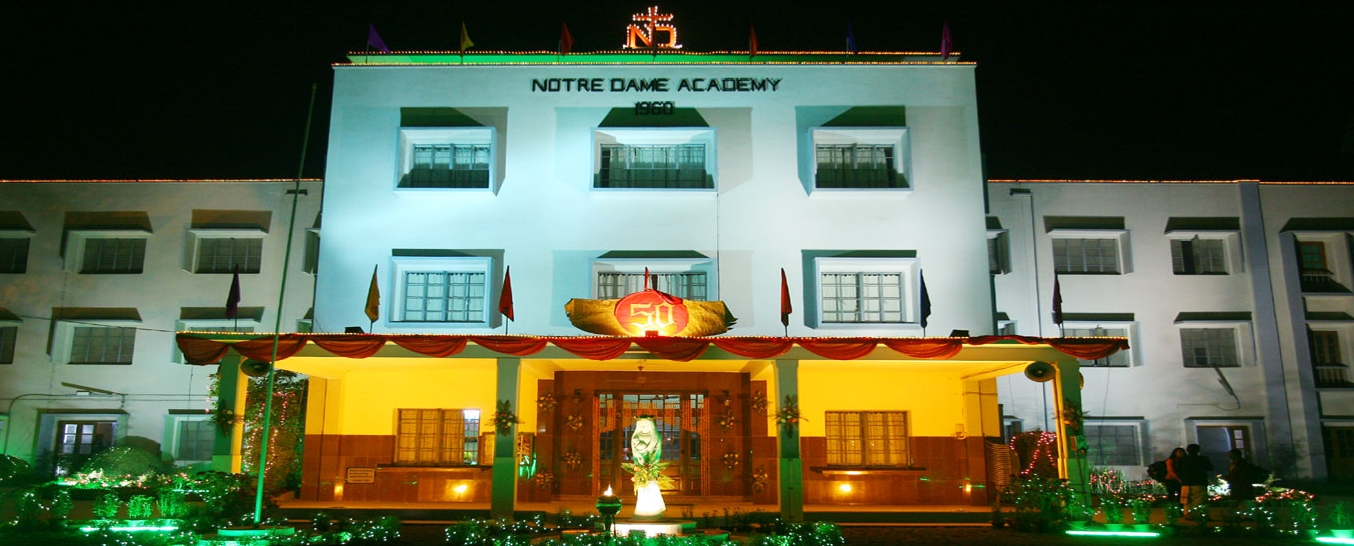
- Notre Dame Academy Main Building
- Patliputra Colony; Patna, Bihar, 800013; India

Information
- Motto: "Lead Me From Darkness to Light "
- Denomination: Roman Catholic
- Established: 1960; 66 years ago
- Founder: St. Julie Billiart
- School district: Patna
- Area trustee: Miss Sheenam Gupta
- Principal: Sr. Mary Neha, SND
- Grades: 1–12
- Gender: female
- Classes offered: 1–12th grade
- Language: English
- Hours in school day: 6 hours
- Classrooms: Well equipped
- Houses: Blue, Green, Red, Yellow
- Colours: Red and White
- Nickname: Damian
- Accreditation: Central Board of Secondary Education
- Affiliation: CBSE
- Website: notredameacademypatna.in

Notre Dame Academy (NDA) is a Roman Catholic secondary school for girls in Patna, India, in the Roman Catholic Archdiocese of Patna, serving girls in grades 1–12. It is affiliated to CBSE board.

== History ==
The first Notre Dame School in India was founded in Jamalpur, Bihar in 1950. The Notre Dame Academy, Patna was founded on 2 February 1960, under control of the Patna Notre Dame Sister's Society by Sister St. Thomas SND, Sister Mary Freda and Sister Sushila. It is associated with the Roman Catholic Archdiocese of Patna.

The society was founded in 1804 by St. Julie Billiart (1751–1816) as Congregation of the Sisters of Notre Dame de Namur in France. From there the Congregation of the Sisters of Notre Dame was formed in Coesfeld, Germany, in 1850, from where the mission spread, offering educational, social and medical services.

Today, it is a girls' school in the city, with an emphasis on extracurricular activities along with studies. It has a Montessori section which allows co-education. The school is associated with SPIC MACAY programs.

It supports Julie School, a school system for the poor who cannot afford to pay for their education. Notre Dame celebrated its Golden Jubilee in 2009.

== Administration ==
- Principal – Sister Neha SND
- Headmistress – Sister Mary Rosemary SND
- Director – Sister Mary Tessy SND

== Motto ==
"Lead Me From Darkness To Light".

== Notable alumni ==
- Neetu Chandra
- Pranati Rai Prakash
- Shambhavi Choudhary

== See also ==
- Pustak Mahal
