= Rajesh Kumar Manjhi =

Indian politician

Member of the India Parliament for Gaya
- In office 2004–2009
- Preceded by: Ramji Manjhi
- Succeeded by: Hari Manjhi

Personal details
- Born: 12 April 1968 (age 58) Gaya, Bihar
- Party: RJD
- Spouse: Pramila Kumari
- Children: 1 daughter 1 son
- As of 26 September, 2006

Rajesh Kumar Manjhi (born 12 April 1968) was a member of the 14th Lok Sabha of India. He represented the Gaya constituency of Bihar and is a member of the Rashtriya Janata Dal (RJD) political party.

== Suspension ==
Manjhi was suspended from 30 sittings of the Lok Sabha in 2007 for taking a female friend on an official tour and presenting her as his wife.
