= Sunita Singh Chauhan =

Indian politician

Member of the Bihar Legislative Assembly
- In office 2015–2020; 2010–2015
- Constituency: Belsand

Personal details
- Political party: Janata Dal (United)

Sunita Singh Chauhan is an Indian politician. She was member of the Bihar Legislative Assembly from Belsand vidhan sabha constituency in Sitamarhi district.

== Political career ==
She joined politics in 2000. She made her debut as member of legislative assembly in March 2005. But due to hung assembly, another election was scheduled in the very same year. In the November–December 2005 election, she again won her election and served as a member of the Bihar legislative assembly until 2010. In 2015 she again contested as a Janata Dal (United) (JDU) candidate from Belsand vidhan sabha constituency. She won, defeating her nearest rival Md. Nasir Ahmad of Lok Janshakti Party. She is criticised for taking her husband inside the vidhan sabha presidings and getting benefit as a MLA.
