= Nayan Tara Das =

Indian politician

Nayan Tara Das (born 1 January 1915, date of death unknown) was member of 1st Lok Sabha from Jamui (Lok Sabha constituency) in Bihar. He was born in Puranigunj, Monghyr.

He was elected to 2nd from Munger, 3rd and 4th Lok Sabha from Jamui.
