= Jyoti Devi =

Indian politician

Member of Bihar Legislative Assembly
- Incumbent
- Assumed office 2020
- Preceded by: Samata Devi
- Constituency: Barachatti

Personal details
- Party: Hindustani Awam Morcha (Secular)
- Other political affiliations: Janata Dal (United)
- Education: 12th Pass
- Alma mater: Wazirganj College
- Profession: Social service

Jyoti Devi is an Indian politician from Bihar and a Member of the Bihar Legislative Assembly. Devi won the Barachatti Assembly constituency on the Hindustani Awam Morcha (Secular) ticket in the 2020 Bihar Legislative Assembly election.
