= Arun Bharti =

Indian politician (born 1976)

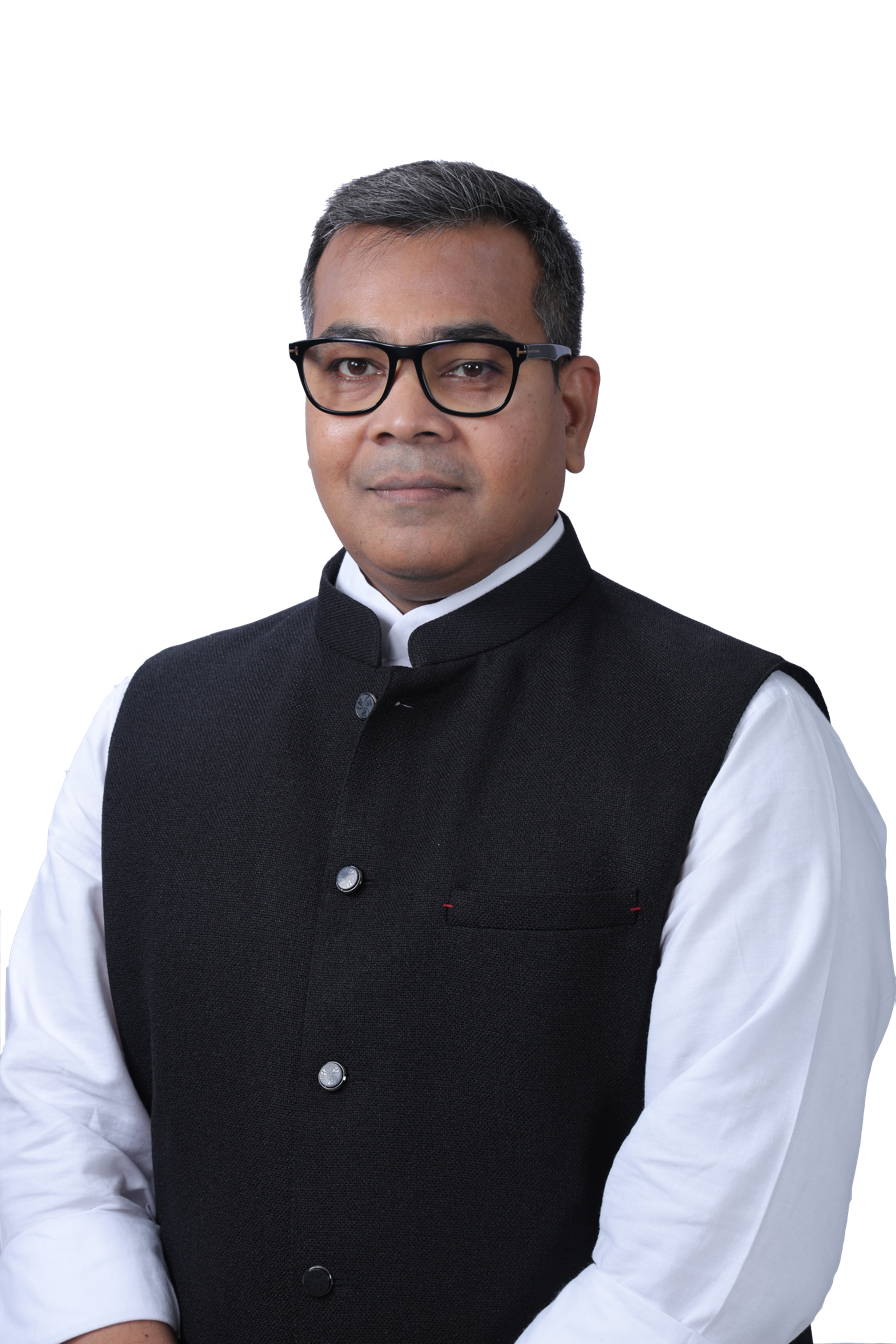
- Official portrait, 2024

Member of Parliament, Lok Sabha
- Incumbent
- Assumed office 4 June 2024
- Preceded by: Chirag Paswan
- Constituency: Jamui, Bihar

Personal details
- Born: 31 March 1976 (age 50) Bokaro Steel City, Jharkhand, India
- Party: Lok Janshakti Party (Ram Vilas)
- Spouse: Nisha Bharti (m. 2005)
- Relations: Ram Vilas Paswan (father-in-law); Chirag Paswan (brother-in-law)
- Children: 2
- Education: University of Strathclyde, Glasgow (MBA in Finance)
- Occupation: Politician; businessman

Arun Bharti (born 31 March 1976) is an Indian politician. He has been elected to Lok Sabha from Jamui Lok Sabha constituency. He is a member of Lok Janshakti Party (Ram Vilas) party.

He is the brother-in-law of Chirag Paswan, a member of Parliament from Hajipur Lok Sabha constituency and son-in-law of former Member of Parliament Ram Vilas Paswan.

== Early life and education ==
He was born on 31 March 1976 to Ram Yash Ram, who worked as Commercial observer at Bokaro Steel City and Dr. Jyoti, a former Minister in the Government of Bihar at Hajipur, Patna.

He had completed bachelor's in commerce from Shri Ram College of Commerce under Delhi University and later completed his Master of Business Administration from Strathclyde Business School University in 2004.

== Personal life ==
Bharti is married to Nisha, daughter of Ram Vilas Paswan and Reena Paswan, since 23 June 2005 and with whom he has a son and a daughter.

== See also ==
- Ram Vilas Paswan
- Chirag Paswan
- Jamui Lok Sabha constituency
- Lok Janshakti Party (Ram Vilas)
