= Kumar Sarvjeet =

Former agriculture minister of Bihar

- कुमार सर्वजीत
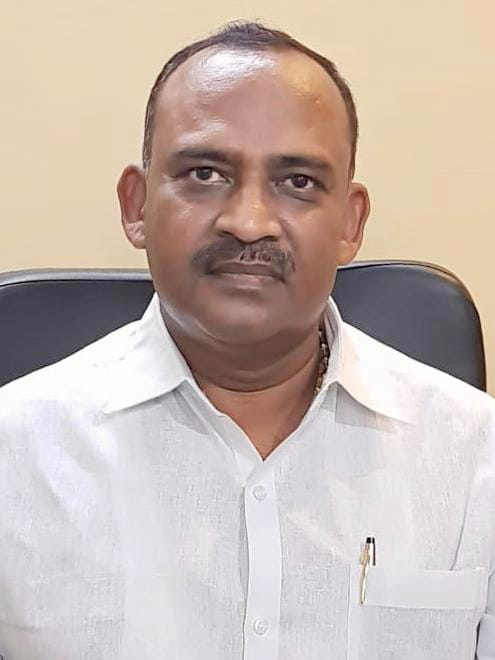

Minister of Tourism Government of Bihar
- In office 16 August 2022 – 28 January 2024
- Governor: Phagu Chauhan; Rajendra Arlekar
- Chief Minister: Nitish Kumar
- Deputy Chief Minister: Tejashwi Yadav
- Preceded by: Narayan Prasad
- Constituency: Bodh Gaya

Member of Bihar Legislative Assembly
- Incumbent
- Assumed office 23 November 2020
- Governor: Phagu Chauhan
- Chief Minister: Nitish Kumar
- Political Party: Rashtriya Janata Dal
- Constituency: Bodh Gaya

Member of Bihar Legislative Assembly
- In office 20 November 2015 – 23 November 2020
- Governor: Ram Nath Kovind; Satya Pal Malik; Lalji Tandon
- Chief Minister: Nitish Kumar
- Political Party: Rashtriya Janata Dal
- Preceded by: Shyamdeo Paswan
- Constituency: Bodh Gaya

Member of Bihar Legislative Assembly
- In office 2009 – 26 November 2010
- Governor: Devanand Konwar
- Chief Minister: Nitish Kumar
- Preceded by: Hari Manjhi
- Succeeded by: Shyamdeo Paswan
- Constituency: Bodh Gaya

Personal details
- Born: Kumar Sarvjeet; 3 April 1975 (age 51)
- Party: Rashtriya Janata Dal
- Other political affiliations: Mahagathbandhan (Bihar)
- Spouse: Seema Kumari (m. 2004)
- Children: 2 Sons
- Parents: Rajesh Kumar (Member of Parliament, Lok Sabha); Father Chandra Mani Devi; Mother
- Education: Birla Institute of Technology, Mesra (B.E. Production Engineering)
- Profession: Social Services; Politician

Kumar Sarvjeet (born 3 April 1975) is an Indian politician from Bihar. He was the minister of tourism, Bihar, and a member of the Bihar Legislative Assembly from Bodh Gaya.

He is the son of Member of Parliament, Lok Sabha Rajesh Kumar. He is also a social worker and member of the Rashtriya Janata Dal, the largest political party in the state of Bihar, India. He was elected twice as the representative of the Bodh Gaya (Vidhan Sabha constituency), being the first to do so in 63 years. He belongs to the Dalit community of Paswan. He entered politics after his father's murder.

== Early life and education ==
Kumar Sarvjeet was born into a family of Paswans in Chahal Mundera, Gaya district, Bihar. His parents are Chandra Mani Devi and Rajesh Kumar, a member of parliament. He is the eldest and has two sisters. He married Seema Kumari in 2004 and they have two sons. He attended St. M. G. Public School, Patna, Bihar. Later, he studied at Mahesh Singh Yadav College, Gaya.He completed his engineering degree in 2001 at Birla Institute of Technology, Mesra, Ranchi, Jharkhand.

== Career ==
In 2005, Sarvjeet entered politics after his father was murdered near Madar, Dumaria, Gaya district. He contested from Bodh Gaya Assembly constituency representing Lok Janshakti Party in 2009 by election and won as an MLA for the first time. But he lost to Shyamdeo Paswan of Bharatiya Janata Party by a margin of 11,213 votes in the 2010 Bihar Legislative Assembly election. He retained the seat as a member of the Mahagathbandan on RJD ticket in the 2015 Bihar Legislative Assembly elections, and again in 2020 on RJD ticket.
