= Jamui Lok Sabha constituency =

Lok Sabha constituency in Bihar

Coordinates: 24.9°N 86.2°E

Jamui
- Lok Sabha constituency

Constituency details
- Country: India
- Region: East India
- State: Bihar
- Assembly constituencies: Tarapur; Sheikhpura; Sikandra; Jamui; Jhajha; Chakai
- Established: 1952–1977; 2008
- Reservation: SC

Member of Parliament
- 18th Lok Sabha
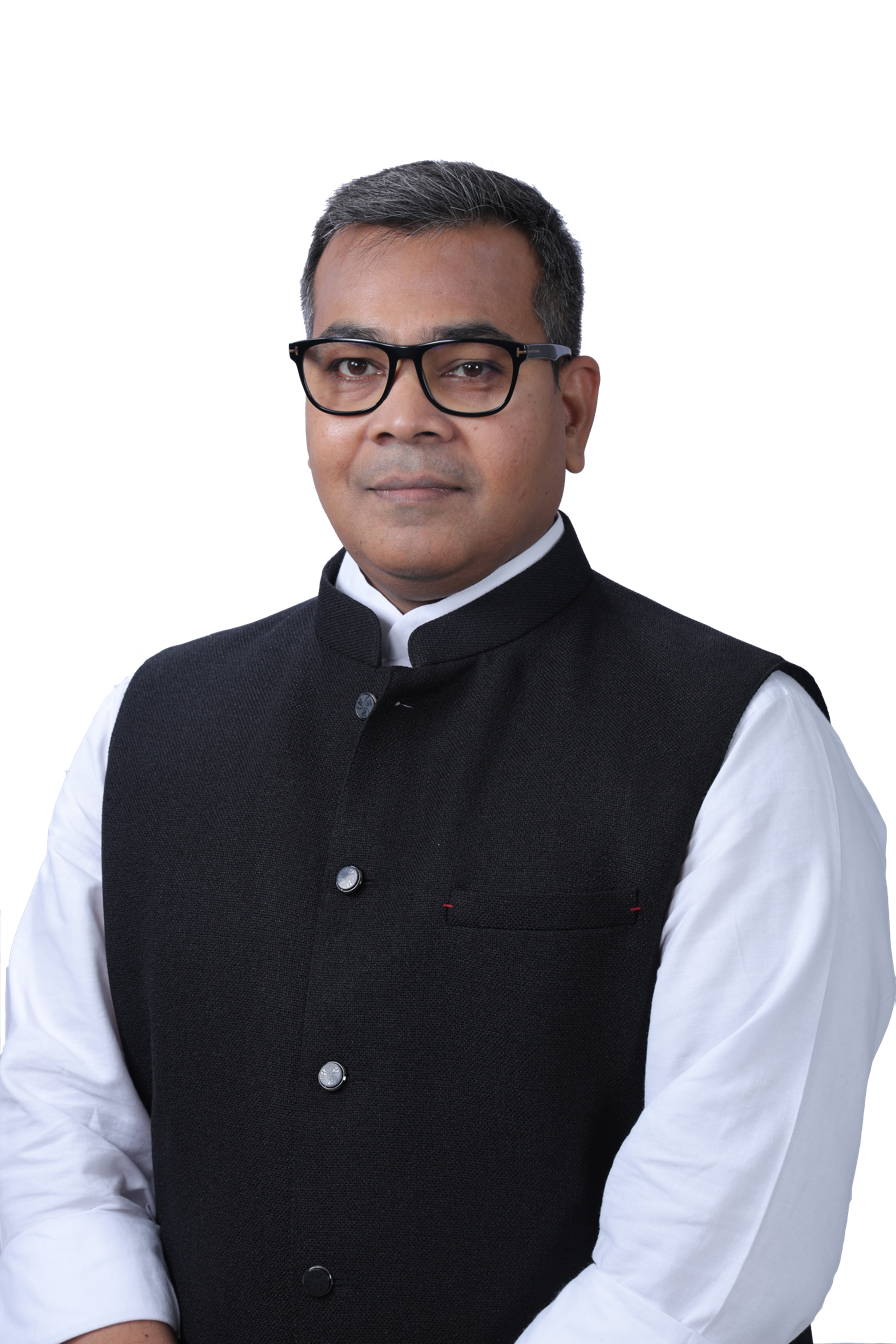
- Incumbent Arun Bharti
- Party: LJP(RV)
- Alliance: NDA
- Elected year: 2024
- Preceded by: Chirag Paswan

Jamui is one of the 40 Lok Sabha (parliamentary) constituencies in Bihar state in eastern India. It was in existence between 1952 and 1971. This constituency again came into existence in 2008 as a part of the implementation of delimitation of parliamentary constituencies based on the recommendations of the Delimitation Commission of India constituted in 2002. This Lok sabha seats is dominated by Yadav's

== Assembly segments ==
Presently, Jamui Lok Sabha constituency comprises six Vidhan Sabha (legislative assembly) segments. These are:

#	Name	District	Member	Party	2024 lead
164	Tarapur	Munger	Samrat Choudhary ( Chief Minister)	BJP	LJP(RV)
169	Sheikhpura	Sheikhpura	Randhir Kumar Soni	JD(U)	LJP(RV)
240	Sikandra (SC)	Jamui	Prafull Manjhi	HAM(S)	LJP(RV)
241	Jamui	Jamui	Shreyasi Singh	BJP	LJP(RV)
242	Jhajha	Jamui	Damodar Rawat	JD(U)	LJP(RV)
243	Chakai	Jamui	Savitri Devi	RJD	LJP(RV)

== Members of Parliament ==
Year	Name	Party
1952	Banarsi Prasad Sinha	Indian National Congress
1952	Nayan Tara Das	Indian National Congress
1962	Nayan Tara Das	Indian National Congress
1967	Nayan Tara Das	Indian National Congress
1971	Bhola Manjhi	Communist Party of India
1977-2004: Constituency does not exist.
2009	Bhudeo Choudhary	Janata Dal (United)
2014	Chirag Paswan	Lok Janshakti Party
2019	Chirag Paswan	Lok Janshakti Party
2024	Arun Bharti	Lok Janshakti Party (Ram Vilas)

== Election results ==
=== 2024 ===
2024 Indian general elections: Jamui
Party	Candidate	Votes	%	±%
LJP(RV)	Arun Bharti	509,046	51.98	
RJD	Archana Kumari	3,96,564	40.5	
NOTA	None of the Above	26,182	2.67	
Independent	Subhash Paswan	13,875	1.42	
BSP	Sakaldeo Das	12,366	1.26	
Majority		1,12,482	11.48	
Turnout		9,79,337	51.26	▼3.99
LJP(RV) gain from LJP		Swing		

=== 2019 ===
2019 Indian general elections: Jamui
Party	Candidate	Votes	%	±%
LJP	Chirag Paswan	528,771	55.76	+18.95
RLSP	Bhudeo Choudhary	2,87,716	30.34	+30.34
NOTA	None of the Above	39,450	4.16	+1.64
BSP	Upendra Ravidas	31,598	3.33	+1.40
IND	Subash Paswan	16,701	1.76	+1.76
Majority		2,41,049	25.40	+14.32
Turnout		9,49,561	55.25	+5.24
LJP hold		Swing		

=== General elections 2014 ===
2014 Indian general elections: Jamui
Party	Candidate	Votes	%	±%
LJP	Chirag Paswan	285,352	36.79	
RJD	Sudhansu Kumar Bhaskar	1,99,407	25.71	
JD(U)	Uday Narayan Choudhary	1,98,599	25.60	
NOTA	None of the Above	19,517	2.52	
BSP	Brahmadev Anand Paswan	15,008	1.93	
JMM	Upendra Ravidas	10,748	1.39	
Majority		85,947	11.08	
Turnout		7,75,650	50.01	
LJP gain from JD(U)		Swing		

== See also ==
- Jamui district
