= Chirag Paswan =

Indian politician (born 1982)

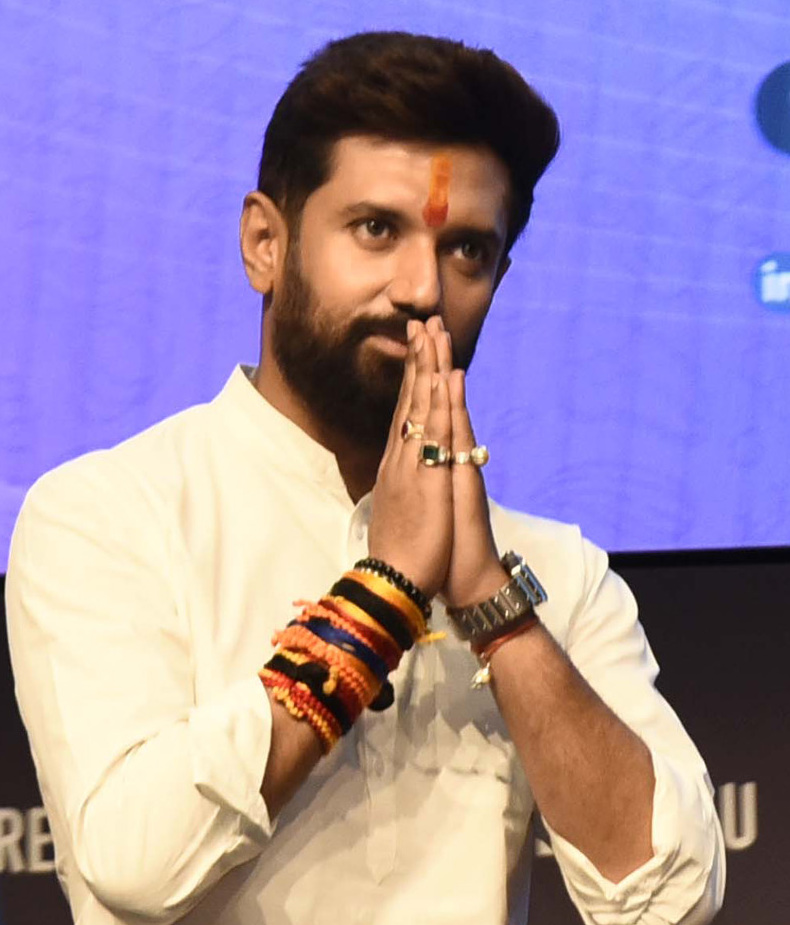
- Paswan in June 2024

19th Union Minister of Food Processing Industries
- Incumbent
- Assumed office 9 June 2024
- President: Droupadi Murmu
- Prime Minister: Narendra Modi
- Preceded by: Kiren Rijiju

Member of Parliament, Lok Sabha
- Incumbent
- Assumed office 4 June 2024
- Preceded by: Pashupati Kumar Paras
- Constituency: Hajipur, Bihar
- In office 16 May 2014 – 4 June 2024
- Preceded by: Bhudeo Choudhary
- Succeeded by: Arun Bharti
- Constituency: Jamui, Bihar

President of Lok Janshakti Party (Ram Vilas)
- Incumbent
- Assumed office 5 October 2021
- Preceded by: Office established

2nd President of the Lok Janshakti Party
- In office 5 November 2019 – 15 June 2021
- Preceded by: Ram Vilas Paswan
- Succeeded by: Office abolished

Personal details
- Born: 31 October 1982 (age 43) Delhi, India
- Party: Lok Janshakti Party (Ram Vilas)
- Other party: Lok Janshakti Party (till 2021)
- Parent: Ram Vilas Paswan (father)
- Relatives: Arun Bharti (brother-in-law); Prince Raj (cousin); Pashupati Kumar Paras (uncle); Ram Chandra Paswan (uncle); Sadhu Paswan (brother-in-law)
- Occupation: Politician; former actor

Chirag Paswan (born 31 October 1982) is an Indian politician and former actor who is serving as the 19th Minister of Food Processing Industries since June 2024. He is the 1st president of the Lok Janshakti Party (Ram Vilas) since 2021, 2nd president of the Lok Janshakti Party from 2019 to 2021 and a Member of Parliament, Lok Sabha from the Hajipur Lok Sabha constituency since 2024. He is the son of late Member of Parliament and Union Minister, Ram Vilas Paswan.

== Early life and acting career ==
He was born to Ram Vilas Paswan, former Union Minister and founder of Lok Janshakti Party, and Reena Sharma, a Punjabi Hindu air hostess from Amritsar.

Paswan attended the Institute of Engineering and Technology (Bundelkhand University), Jhansi. After dropping out from college, he starred in a Hindi movie Miley Naa Miley Hum (2011).

== Political career ==
Paswan contested the 2014 elections for the Lok Janshakti Party in the seat of Jamui. He won the seat, defeating Sudhansu Shekhar Bhaskar of Rashtriya Janata Dal by over 85,000 votes. Paswan retained his seat in the 2019 elections, securing a total of 528,771 votes and defeating Bhudeo Choudhary.

Paswan owns an NGO named Chirag Ka Rojgar, a foundation to provide jobs to the unemployed youths of his state.

Paswan was elected as a member of the 16th Lok Sabha in the 2014 Indian general election from Jamui constituency in Bihar, while his father won from Hajipur constituency, both through Lok Janshakti Party.

On 27 February 2021, Paswan donated ₹1.11 lakh for the construction of the Ram Mandir in Ayodhya.

On 14 June 2021, Paswan was replaced as Lok Sabha leader of the LJP by his uncle Pashupati Kumar Paras. A day after, Paswan expelled 5 MP's for anti-party activities including his uncle Pashupati Kumar Paras and cousin Prince Raj.

On 10 June 2024, Paswan was nominated as Union Cabinet Minister for Food Processing In India under the BJP Government.

== Electoral performance ==
Year	Constituency	Party	Result	% Vote	±%
2024	Hajipur	LJP(RV)	Won	53.3	▼ -2.46
2019	Jamui	LJP	Won	55.76	▲ +18.97
2014	Jamui	LJP	Won	36.79	

== Filmography ==
- 2011 Miley Na Miley Hum

== Awards ==
Year	Awards	Category	Film	In
2012	Stardust Awards	Superstar Of Tomorrow - Male	Miley Naa Miley Hum	Nominated

== See also ==
- List of politicians from Bihar
- Pashupati Kumar Paras
- Lok Janshakti Party
- Ram Chandra Paswan
- Kapildev Singh
- Lok Janshakti Party (Ram Vilas)
- Surajbhan Singh
- Third Modi ministry
