= Bhagwati Devi =

Indian politician and social worker (1936–2003)

Member of Parliament, Lok Sabha
- In office 1996–1998
- Succeeded by: Krishna Kumar Choudhary
- Constituency: Gaya, Bihar

Member of the Bihar Legislative Assembly
- In office 1969 - 1972, 1977 – 1980
- Constituency: Barachatti, Bihar
- In office 1995 - 1996, 2000 – 2003
- Constituency: Barachatti, Bihar

Personal details
- Born: 6 November 1936 Mithaiya, Aurangabad, Bihar, India
- Died: 21 July 2003 (aged 67) New Delhi, India
- Party: Rashtriya Janata Dal
- Other political affiliations: Janata Dal; Janata Party; Samyukta Socialist Party
- Spouse: Bifai Das
- Children: 4
- Occupation: Politician, Social Worker

Bhagwati Devi (6 November 1936 – 21 July 2003) was an Indian politician and social worker who served as Member of Parliament in the Lok Sabha from Gaya, Bihar. She was also elected to the Bihar Legislative Assembly for four times between 1969 and 2000 from Barachatti. She was known for her contributions to the upliftment of marginalised communities and women.

== Early life ==
Bhagwati Devi was born on 6 November 1936 in village Mithaiya which comes under Aurangabad district in Bihar.

== Career ==
She became a Member of the Bihar Legislative Assembly in 1969 from Barchatti. During 1995–96, she served as—

- Member of various Committees, Bihar Legislative Assembly
- Member, Committee on Electricity Board, Bihar

She was elected to the 11th Lok Sabha in 1996.

== Special Interests And Social Activities ==
She works towards the upliftment of the downtrodden and weaker sections of society. She has also contributed towards the welfare of women and struggle for social justice. She also devotes personal time to Satsangs.

== Other information ==
Bhagwati participated in the freedom struggle and was imprisoned a number of times for participating in political agitations. She has held various position in Samajwadi Party and Janata Dal. She has been associated with Ram Manohar Lohia, Jayaprakash Narayan and Karpoori Thakur. Her biography titled "Dharati ki Beti" is written by Ram Pyare Singh.

Devi died on 21 July 2003, at the age of 67.
