= Lok Janshakti Party (Ram Vilas) =

Political party in India

- Abbreviation: LJP (RV), LJP (R)
- President: Chirag Paswan
- Founder: Chirag Paswan
- Founded: 5 October 2021 (4 years ago)
- Merger of: Bharatiya Sab Log Party
- Split from: Lok Janshakti Party
- Headquarters: 1-wheeler road Patna, Bihar 800001
- Ideology: Social Justice; Secularism
- Political position: Centre
- Colours: Violet
- Seats in Rajya Sabha: 0 / 245
- Seats in Lok Sabha: 5 / 543
- Seats in State Legislative Assemblies: List 19 / 243 (Bihar) 2 / 60 (Nagaland) 1 / 81 (Jharkhand)
- Number of states and union territories in government: 2 / 31

Election symbol
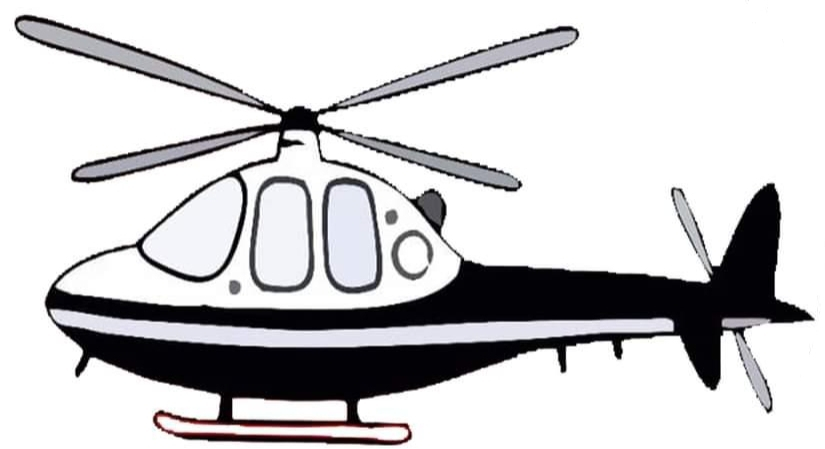

Party flag

Lok Janshakti Party (Ram Vilas) (abbr. LJP(RV), lit. 'People's Manpower Party (Ram Vilas)') is an Indian political party formed in 2021 under the leadership of Chirag Paswan. Election Commission of India froze the symbol of erstwhile main Lok Janshakti Party and allotted new name and symbol to both factions. It is now one of two separate factions – the other being the Rashtriya Lok Janshakti Party.

== Electoral history ==
=== Nagaland ===
LJP (RV) fielded candidates in 15 seats – two candidates won from Pughoboto and Tobu and eight candidates came second in eight other seats. The party received "state party" status in Nagaland, with around 8.65% of total votes.

=== Jharkhand ===
LJP (RV) fielded 1 candidate as part of the National Democratic Alliance from Chatra Assembly constituency. It won the only seat it contested and had an overall vote share of 0.61%.

=== Bihar ===
LJP (RV) fielded 29 candidates as part of the National Democratic Alliance. seat sharing deal. It won 19 seats it contested and had an overall vote share of 4.97%.

== Electoral performance ==
=== Indian general elections ===
Lok Sabha Elections
| Year | Lok Sabha | Party leader | Seats contested | Seats won | Change in seats | Percentage of votes | Vote swing | Popular vote | Outcome |
|---|---|---|---|---|---|---|---|---|---|
| 2024 | 18th | Chirag Paswan | 5 | 5 / 543 | ▲5 | 0.44% | Steady | 2,810,250 | Government |

=== State legislative assembly elections ===
State assembly election results
| Year | Party leader | Pre-poll alliance | Seats contested | Seats won / Seats contested | Change in seats | Total votes | Overall vote % | Vote swing | Outcome |
Bihar
| 2025 | Chirag Paswan | NDA | 30 | 19 / 30 | Steady | 2,497,358 | 4.97% | new | Government |
Delhi
| 2025 | | NDA | 1 | 0 / 1 | Steady | 50,209 | 0.53% | new | Steady |
Chhattisgarh
| 2023 | | none | 3 | 0 / 3 | Steady | 1,063 | 0.01% | new | Steady |
Gujarat
| 2022 | | none | 1 | 0 / 1 | Steady | 411 | 0% | new | Steady |
Jharkhand
| 2024 | Janardan Paswan | NDA | 1 | 1 / 1 | ▲1 | 109,019 | 0.61 | new | Opposition |
Madhya Pradesh
| 2023 | | none | 2 | 0 / 2 | Steady | 930 | 0% | new | Steady |
Manipur
| 2022 | | none | 3 | 0 / 3 | Steady | 626 | 0.03% | new | Steady |
Nagaland
| 2023 | Richard Humtsoe | none | 16 | 2 / 16 | ▲2 | 98,972 | 8.64% | new | Support NPF-BJP govt. |
Rajasthan
| 2023 | Chirag Paswan | none | 9 | 0 / 9 | Steady | 3,181 | 0.01% | new | Steady |
Uttar Pradesh
| 2022 | | none | 21 | 0 / 21 | Steady | 12,247 | 0.01% | new | Steady |

== List of party leaders ==
=== National Presidents/National Spokenpors/State President ===
| No. | Portrait | Name President/Spokenpson/State President | Term in office | | |
| No. | Portrait | Name President/Spokenpson/State President | Assumed office | Left office | Time in office |
|---|---|---|---|---|---|
| 1 | | Chirag Paswan; National President Lok Janshakti Party(Ram Vilas) | 5 October 2021 | Incumbent | 4 years, 325 days |
| 2 | | Surendra Vivek; Bihar State President Lok Janshakti Party(Ram Vilas) | 26 August 2026 | Incumbent | 0 days |
| 3 | | Arvind Kumar Bajpai; National Spokenporson Lok Janshakti Party(Ram Vilas) | 5 October 2021 | Incumbent | 4 years, 325 days |
| 4 | | Richard Humtsoe; Nagaland State President Lok Janshakti Party(Ram Vilas) | 5 October 2021 | Incumbent | 4 years, 325 days |
| 5 | | Janardan Paswan; Jharkhand State President Lok Janshakti Party(Ram Vilas) | 25 July 2024 | Incumbent | 2 years, 32 days |

== List of MLAs across Indian States ==
=== Bihar ===
| AC No. | AC Name | Candidate name | Gender | Age | Total Votes | Vote % | Result |
|---|---|---|---|---|---|---|---|
| 11 | Sugauli | Rajesh Kumar Alias Bablu Gupta | Male | 55 | 98,875 | 49.74 | Won |
| 14 | Govindganj | Raju Tiwari | Male | 55 | 96,034 | 52.55 | Won |
| 30 | Belsand | Amit Kumar | Male | 34 | 82,076 | 44.83 | Won |
| 52 | Bahadurganj | Mohammad Kalimuddin | Male | 57 | 57,195 | 26.34 | Lost |
| 58 | Kasba | Nitesh Kumar Singh | Male | 39 | 86,877 | 36.81 | Won |
| 65 | Balrampur | Sangita Devi | Female | 41 | 80,459 | 29.04 | Won |
| 76 | Simri Bakhtiarpur | Sanjay Kumar Singh | Male | 58 | 109,699 | 46.94 | Won |
| 91 | Bochahan (SC) | Baby Kumari | Female | 48 | 108,186 | 49.43 | Won |
| 107 | Darauli (SC) | Vishnu Deo Paswan | Male | 33 | 83,014 | 47.38 | Won |
| 119 | Garkha (SC) | Simant Mrinal | Male | 34 | 78,330 | 38.49 | Lost |
| 126 | Mahua | Sanjay Kumar Singh | Male | 45 | 87,641 | 41.47 | Won |
| 145 | Sahebpur Kamal | Surendra Kumar Alias Surendra Vivek | Male | 55 | 61,077 | 32.20 | Lost |
| 147 | Bakhri (SC) | Sanjay Kumar | Male | 52 | 98,511 | 47.67 | Won |
| 151 | Parbatta | Babulal Shorya | Male | 38 | 118,677 | 55.18 | Won |
| 158 | Nathnagar | Mithun Kumar | Male | 39 | 118,143 | 48.92 | Won |
| 180 | Bakhtiarpur | Arun Kumar S/O Satrughan Sao | Male | 51 | 88,520 | 45.14 | Won |
| 185 | Fatuha | Rupa Kumari | Female | 29 | 82,566 | 41.66 | Lost |
| 187 | Maner | Jitendra Yadav | Male | 45 | 90,764 | 40.14 | Lost |
| 190 | Paliganj | Sunil Kumar | Male | 42 | 74,450 | 40.83 | Lost |
| 199 | Brahampur | Hulas Pande | Male | 48 | 92,608 | 44.87 | Lost |
| 207 | Chenari (SC) | Murari Prasad Gautam | Male | 45 | 95,579 | 46.44 | Won |
| 212 | Dehri | Rajeev Ranjan Singh Alias Sonu Singh | Male | 41 | 104,022 | 54.29 | Won |
| 218 | Makhdumpur (SC) | Rani Kumari | Female | 50 | 72,939 | 43.83 | Lost |
| 220 | Obra | Prakash Chandra | Male | 47 | 91,638 | 44.83 | Won |
| 226 | Sherghati | Uday Kumar Singh | Male | 52 | 77,270 | 38.13 | Won |
| 229 | Bodh Gaya (SC) | Shyamdeo Paswan | Male | 53 | 99,355 | 43.00 | Lost |
| 235 | Rajauli (SC) | Vimal Rajbanshi | Male | 59 | 90,272 | 44.98 | Won |
| 238 | Gobindpur | Binita Mehta | Female | 42 | 72,581 | 40.12 | Won |

=== Jharkhand ===
2024 Jharkhand Legislative Assembly Election: Chatra
| Party | Candidate | Votes | Vote % | Change |
|---|---|---|---|---|
| LJP (RV) | Janardan Paswan | 109,019 | 40.58 | New |

=== Nagaland ===
Nagaland Legislative Assembly Election – LJP (RV) MLA's
| District | AC No. | Assembly Constituency | Candidate | Party | Votes | Vote % |
|---|---|---|---|---|---|---|
| Zünheboto | 13 | Pughoboto (ST) | Sukhato A. Sema | LJP (RV) | 7,808 | 52.80 |
| Mon | 55 | Tobu (ST) | Naiba Konyak | LJP (RV) | 10,622 | 51.17 |

== Legislative leaders ==
=== List of union cabinet ministers ===
| No. | Portrait | Name (Birth–Death) | Portfolio | Term in office | | | Elected constituency (House) | Prime Minister |
| No. | Portrait | Name (Birth–Death) | Portfolio | Assumed office | Left office | Time in office | Elected constituency (House) | Prime Minister |
|---|---|---|---|---|---|---|---|---|
| 1 | | Chirag Paswan (b. 1982) | Ministry of Food Processing Industries | 9 June 2024 | Incumbent | 2 years, 78 days | Hajipur (Lok Sabha) | Narendra Modi |

== List of Member of Parliament ==
Lok sabha MPs
| SL. No. | Portrait | Name | Constituency | Assumed office | Left office | Time in office |
|---|---|---|---|---|---|---|
| 1 | | Chirag Paswan (Union Cabinet Minister) | Hajipur | June 4, 2024 | Present | 813 days |
| 2 | | Rajesh Verma | Khagaria | June 4, 2024 | Present | 813 days |
| 3 | | Shambhavi Choudhary | Samastipur | June 4, 2024 | Present | 813 days |
| 4 | | Veena Devi | Vaishali | June 4, 2024 | Present | 813 days |
| 5 | | Arun Bharti | Jamui | June 4, 2024 | Present | 813 days |

== See also ==
- Lok Janshakti Party
- Rashtriya Lok Janshakti Party
- Chirag Paswan, Union Cabinet Minister
- Ram Vilas Paswan
- List of political parties in India
- List of politicians from Bihar
