= 2009 Indian general election in Bihar =

2009 Lok Sabha elections in Bihar

Indian general election in Bihar, 2009
- April–May 2009

40 seats
- Turnout: 44.47%
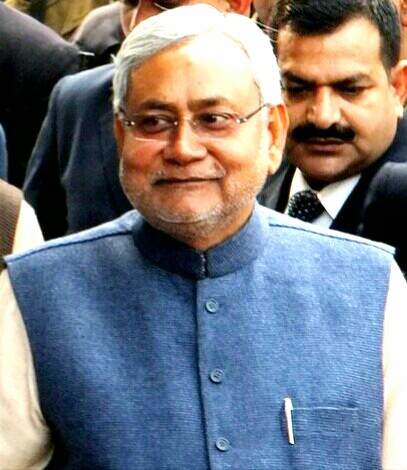

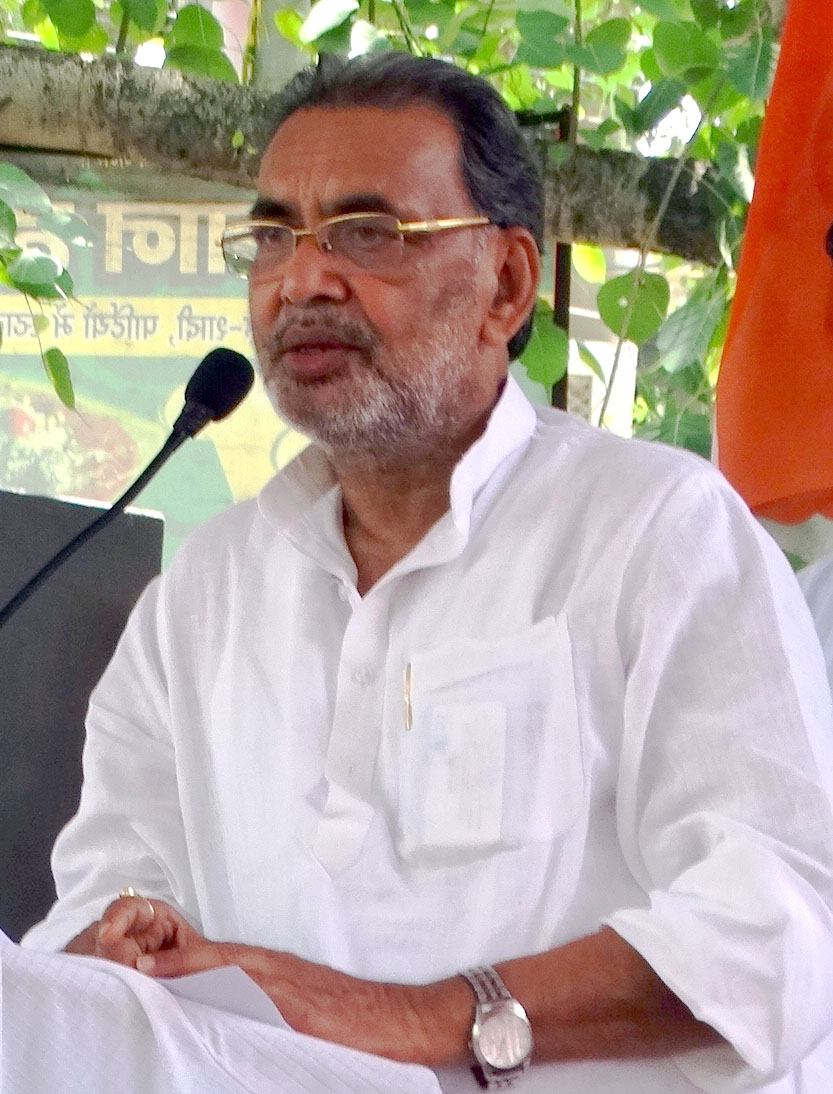

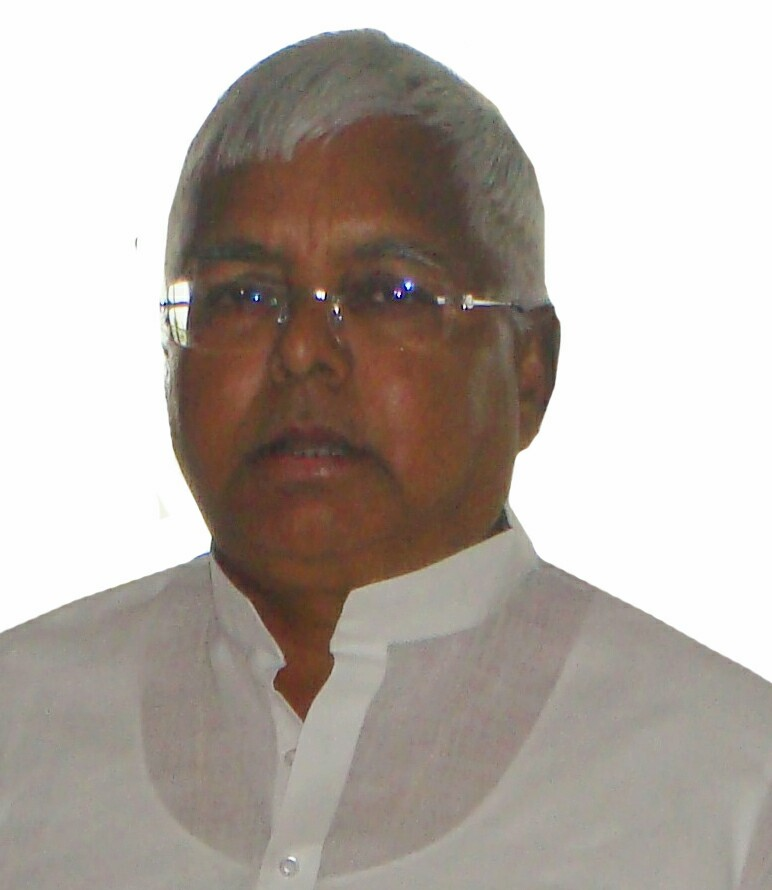

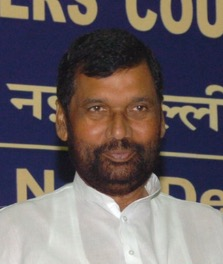
	First party	Second party	Third party
Leader	Nitish Kumar	Radha Mohan Singh	Lalu Prasad Yadav
Party	JD(U)	BJP	RJD
Alliance	NDA	NDA	Fourth Front
Leader's seat	Did not contest	Purvi Champaran (won)	Saran (won), Pataliputra (lost)
Last election	6	5	22
Seats won	20	12	4
Seat change	▲14	▲7	▼18
Percentage	24.04%	13.93%	19.30%
Swing	▲1.68%	▼0.64%	▼11.37%
	Fourth party	Fifth party
Leader		Ram Vilas Paswan
Party	INC	LJP
Alliance	United Progressive Alliance (India)
Leader's seat		Hajipur (lost)
Last election		4
Seats won		0
Seat change		▼4
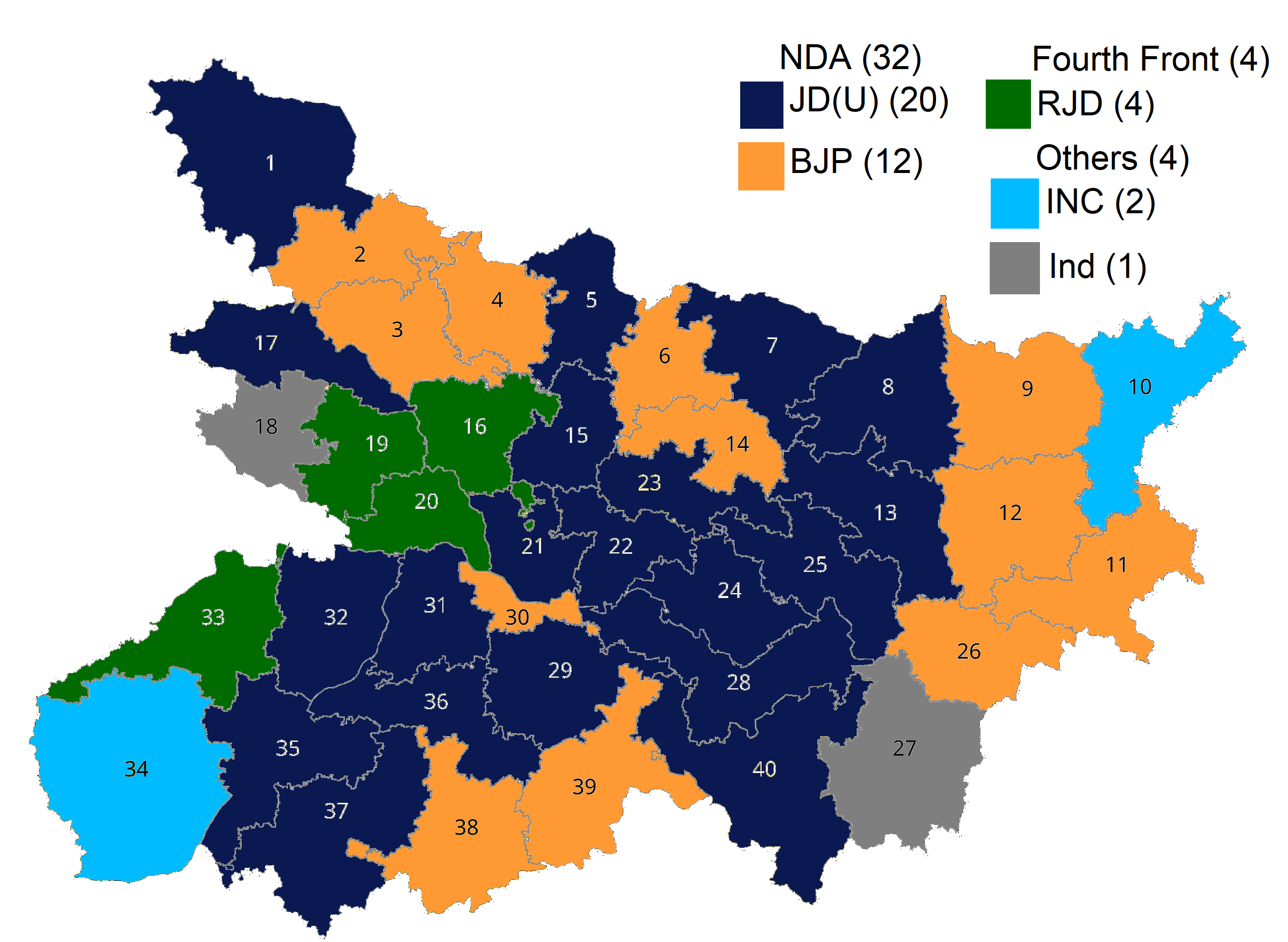
- Bihar
Prime Minister before election
Manmohan Singh
INC
Prime Minister after election
Manmohan Singh
INC

The 2009 Indian general election in Bihar were held for 40 seats with the state going to polls in the first four phases of the general elections. The major contenders in the state were the National Democratic Alliance (NDA), Indian National Congress and the Fourth Front. NDA consisted of the Bharatiya Janata Party (BJP) and Janata Dal (United) whereas the fourth front consisted of the Rashtriya Janata Dal (RJD), Lok Janshakti Party (LJP) and the Samajwadi Party (SP).

The results indicated the complete reversal of the last election, where the NDA won this state in a landslide securing 32 out of 40 seats. The victory is mostly credited to the work of Nitish Kumar and JD(U), and this is the only state where the NDA has had the most success since, they were defeated by Congress and allies, in all the other states, leading to their heavy losses for the NDA in the election.

After disagreement with the UPA on seat sharing, Lalu Prasad Yadav of the Rashtriya Janata Dal joined hands with Lok Janshakti Party and Ram Vilas Paswan, and joined the Fourth Front, with Samajwadi Party. This move proved to be disastrous, since LJP couldn't win a single seat, and RJD were reduced to 4 seats in the Lok Sabha. After the election Laloo Prasad Yadav, admitted that it was a mistake to leave the UPA, and gave unconditional support to Manmohan Singh and the newly formed UPA government.

== Parties and alliances ==
=== National Democratic Alliance ===
National Democratic Alliance
Party	Flag	Symbol	Leader	Seats
Janata Dal (United)			Nitish Kumar	25
Bharatiya Janata Party			Radha Mohan Singh	15
Total				40

=== Fourth Front ===
Party	Flag	Symbol	Leader	Seats contested
Rashtriya Janata Dal			Lalu Prasad Yadav	28
Lok Janshakti Party			Ram Vilas Paswan	12

=== United Progressive Alliance ===
Party	Flag	Symbol	Leader	Seats contested
Indian National Congress			Anil Kumar Sharma	38
Nationalist Congress Party			Tariq Anwar	1 + 1 (Note: Friendly Contest on Valmiki Nagar Lok Sabha constituency between INC and NCP.)
Total				39 + 1 (Note: Friendly Contest on Valmiki Nagar Lok Sabha constituency between INC and NCP.)

== Candidates ==
Constituency		NDA		Third Front		UPA	
#	Name	Party	Candidate	Party	Candidate	Party	Candidate
1	Valmiki Nagar	JD(U)	Baidyanath Prasad Mahto	RJD	Raghunath Jha	INC	Md. Shamim Akhtar
2	Paschim Champaran	BJP	Sanjay Jaiswal	LJP	Prakash Jha	INC	Sadhu Yadav
3	Purvi Champaran	BJP	Radha Mohan Singh	RJD	Akhilesh Prasad Singh	INC	Arvind Kumar Gupta
4	Sheohar	BJP	Rama Devi	RJD	Sitaram Singh	INC	Lovely Anand
5	Sitamarhi	JD(U)	Arjun Rai	RJD	Sitaram Yadav	INC	Samir Kumar Mahaseth
6	Madhubani	BJP	Hukmdev Narayan Yadav	RJD	Abdul Bari Siddiqui	INC	Shakeel Ahmad
7	Jhanjharpur	JD(U)	Mangani Lal Mandal	RJD	Devendra Prasad Yadav	INC	Kripanath Pathak
8	Supaul	JD(U)	Vishwa Mohan Kumar	LJP	Surya Narayan Yadav	INC	Ranjeet Ranjan
9	Araria	BJP	Pradeep Kumar Singh	LJP	Zakir Hussain Khan	INC	Shakeel Ahmad Khan
10	Kishanganj	JD(U)	Syed Md. Ashraf	RJD	Md. Taslimuddin	INC	Asrarul Haq Qasmi
11	Katihar	BJP	Nikhil Kumar Choudhary	LJP	Ahmad Ashfaque Karim	NCP	Tariq Anwar
12	Purnia	BJP	Uday Singh	LJP	Shankar Jha		
13	Madhepura	JD(U)	Sharad Yadav	RJD	Ravindra Charan Yadav	INC	Tara Nand Sada
14	Darbhanga	BJP	Kirti Azad	RJD	Ali Ashraf Fatmi	INC	Ajay Kumar Jalan
15	Muzaffarpur	JD(U)	Jai Narain Prasad	LJP	Bhagwanlal Sahni	INC	Vinita Vijay
16	Vaishali	JD(U)	Vijay Kumar Shukla	RJD	Raghuvansh Singh	INC	Hind Kesari Yadav
17	Gopalganj	JD(U)	Purnmasi Ram	RJD	Anil Kumar	INC	Ramai Ram
18	Siwan	JD(U)	Brishin Patel	RJD	Hena Shahab	INC	Vijay Shanker Dubey
19	Maharajganj	JD(U)	Prabhunath Singh	RJD	Umashanker Singh	INC	Tarkeshwar Singh
20	Saran	BJP	Rajiv Pratap Rudy	RJD	Lalu Prasad Yadav		
21	Hajipur	JD(U)	Ram Sundar Das	LJP	Ram Vilas Paswan	INC	Dasai Chowdhary
22	Ujiarpur	JD(U)	Ashwamedh Devi	RJD	Alok Kumar Mehta	INC	Sheel Kumar Roy
23	Samastipur	JD(U)	Maheshwar Hazari	LJP	Ram Chandra Paswan	INC	Dr. Ashok Kumar
24	Begusarai	JD(U)	Monazir Hassan	LJP	Anil Chaudhary	INC	Amita Bhushan
25	Khagaria	JD(U)	Dinesh Chandra Yadav	RJD	Rabindra Kumar Rana	INC	Mehboob Ali Kaiser
26	Bhagalpur	BJP	Syed Shahnawaz Hussain	RJD	Shakuni Choudhary	INC	Sadanand Singh
27	Banka	JD(U)	Damodar Rawat	RJD	Jay Prakash Yadav	INC	Giridhari Yadav
28	Munger	JD(U)	Rajiv Ranjan Singh	RJD	Ram Badan Roy	INC	Ram Lakhan Singh Yadav
29	Nalanda	JD(U)	Kaushalendra Kumar	LJP	Satish Kumar Yadav	INC	Ram Swaroop Prasad
30	Patna Sahib	BJP	Shatrughan Sinha	RJD	Vijay Kumar	INC	Shekhar Suman
31	Pataliputra	JD(U)	Ranjan Prasad Yadav	RJD	Lalu Prasad Yadav	INC	Vijay Singh Yadav
32	Arrah	JD(U)	Meena Singh	LJP	Rama Kishore Singh	INC	Haridwar Prasad Singh
33	Buxar	BJP	Lalmuni Chaubey	RJD	Jagada Nand Singh	INC	Kamla Kant Tiwary
34	Sasaram	BJP	Muni Lall	RJD	Lalan Paswan	INC	Meira Kumar
35	Karakat	JD(U)	Mahabali Singh	RJD	Kanti Singh	INC	Awadhesh Kumar Singh
36	Jahanabad	JD(U)	Jagdish Sharma	RJD	Surendra Prasad Yadav	INC	Dr. Arun Kumar
37	Aurangabad	JD(U)	Sushil Kumar Singh	RJD	Shakeel Ahmad Khan	INC	Nikhil Kumar
38	Gaya	BJP	Hari Manjhi	RJD	Ramji Manjhi	INC	Sanjiv Prasad Toni
39	Nawada	BJP	Bhola Singh	LJP	Veena Devi	INC	Sunila Devi
40	Jamui	JD(U)	Bhudeo Choudhary	RJD	Shyam Rajak	INC	Ashok Choudhary

== Voting and results ==
Source: Election Commission of India

=== Results by Alliance ===
↓
32	4	2	2
NDA	Fourth Front	UPA	Others

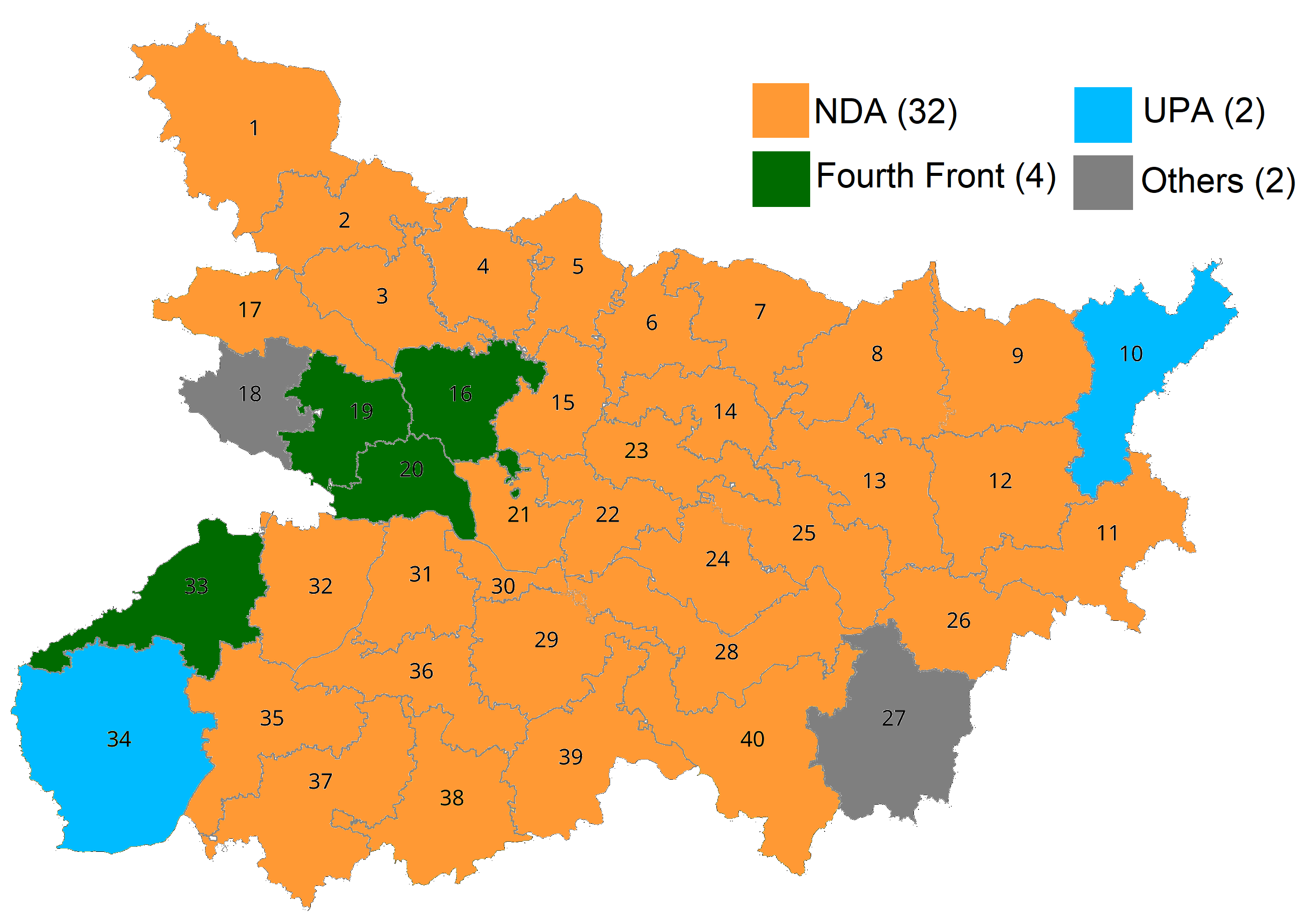
Map displaying constituencies won by Alliances

=== Results by Alliance or Party ===
Alliance/ Party		Popular vote			Seats		
Alliance/ Party		Votes	%	±pp	Contested	Won	+/−
NDA	JD(U)	58,25,874	24.04		25	20	▲14
NDA	BJP	33,76,109	13.93		15	12	▲7
NDA	Total	92,01,983	37.97		40	32	▲21
FFR	RJD	46,78,880	19.31		28	4	▼18
FFR	LJP	15,86,404	6.54		12	0	▼4
FFR	Total	62,65,284	25.85		40	4	▼22
INC		24,87,008	10.26		37	2	▼1
BSP		10,71,808	4.42		39	0	
CPI(M-L)L		4,59,279	1.90		20	0	
CPI		3,39,964	1.40		7	0	
NCP		2,94,469	1.22		2	0	
CPI(M)		1,24,007	0.51		5	0	
JMM		1,08,841	0.45		4	0	
Others		9,42,733	3.89	Steady	175	0	Steady
IND		29,37,221	12.12		304	2	
Total		2,42,32,597	100%	–	672	40	–

Notes:

- FFR stands for Fourth Front
- Since the Fourth front did not exist in 2004, the results in 2004 represents seats won by RJD and LJP in Fourth Front.

=== List of Elected MPs ===
Constituency		Winner				Runner Up				Margin	%
#	Name	Candidate	Party	Votes	%	Candidate	Party	Votes	%	Margin	%
1	Valmiki Nagar	Baidyanath Prasad Mahto	JD(U)	277,696	46.40	Fakhruddin	IND	94,021	15.71	183,675	30.69
2	Paschim Champaran	Sanjay Jaiswal	BJP	198,781	38.56	Prakash Jha	LJP	151,438	29.38	47,343	9.18
3	Purvi Champaran	Radha Mohan Singh	BJP	201,114	41.74	Akhilesh Prasad Singh	RJD	121,824	25.28	79,290	16.46
4	Sheohar	Rama Devi	BJP	233,499	40.80	Md. Anwarul Haque	BSP	107,815	18.84	125,684	21.96
5	Sitamarhi	Arjun Roy	JD(U)	232,782	40.36	Samir Kumar Mahaseth	INC	122,216	21.19	110,566	19.17
6	Madhubani	Hukmdev Narayan Yadav	BJP	164,094	29.48	Abdul Bari Siddiqui	RJD	154,167	27.70	9,927	1.78
7	Jhanjharpur	Mangani Lal Mandal	JD(U)	265,175	43.63	Devendra Prasad Yadav	RJD	192,466	31.66	72,709	11.97
8	Supaul	Vishwa Mohan Kumar	JD(U)	313,677	44.96	Ranjeet Ranjan	INC	147,602	21.16	166,075	23.80
9	Araria	Pradeep Kumar Singh	BJP	282,742	38.71	Zakir Hussain Khan	LJP	260,240	35.63	22,502	3.08
10	Kishanganj	Mohammad Asrarul Haque	INC	239,405	38.19	Syed Mahmood Ashraf	JD(U)	159,136	25.38	80,269	12.81
11	Katihar	Nikhil Kumar Choudhary	BJP	269,834	37.23	Tariq Anwar	NCP	255,819	35.30	14,015	1.93
12	Purnia	Uday Singh	BJP	362,952	51.50	Shanti Priya	IND	176,725	25.08	186,227	26.42
13	Madhepura	Sharad Yadav	JD(U)	370,585	48.99	Prof. Ravindra Charan Yadav	RJD	192,964	25.51	177,621	23.48
14	Darbhanga	Kirti Azad	BJP	239,268	43.85	Ali Ashraf Fatmi	RJD	192,815	35.33	46,453	8.52
15	Muzaffarpur	Jai Narain Prasad Nishad	JD(U)	195,091	31.37	Bhagwanlal Sahni	LJP	147,282	23.69	47,809	7.68
16	Vaishali	Raghuvansh Prasad Singh	RJD	284,479	45.53	Vijay Kumar Shukla	JD(U)	262,171	41.96	22,308	3.57
17	Gopalganj	Purnmasi Ram	JD(U)	200,024	39.64	Anil Kumar	RJD	157,552	31.22	42,472	8.42
18	Siwan	Om Prakash Yadav	IND	236,194	36.80	Hena Shahab	RJD	172,764	26.91	63,430	9.89
19	Maharajganj	Uma Shanaker Singh	RJD	211,610	35.30	Prabhunath Singh	JD(U)	208,813	34.83	2,797	0.47
20	Saran	Lalu Prasad Yadav	RJD	274,209	47.21	Rajiv Pratap Rudy	BJP	222,394	38.29	51,815	8.92
21	Hajipur	Ram Sundar Das	JD(U)	246,715	44.44	Ram Vilas Paswan	LJP	208,761	37.61	37,954	6.83
22	Ujiarpur	Ashwamedh Devi	JD(U)	180,082	31.92	Alok Kumar Mehta	RJD	154,770	27.43	25,312	4.49
23	Samastipur	Maheshwar Hazari	JD(U)	259,458	44.37	Ram Chandra Paswan	LJP	155,082	26.52	104,376	17.85
24	Begusarai	Monazir Hassan	JD(U)	205,680	28.64	Shatrughan Prasad Singh	CPI	164,843	22.95	40,837	5.69
25	Khagaria	Dinesh Chandra Yadav	JD(U)	266,964	42.72	Rabindra Kumar Rana	RJD	128,209	20.51	138,755	22.21
26	Bhagalpur	Syed Shahnawaz Hussain	BJP	228,384	36.30	Shakuni Choudhary	RJD	172,573	27.43	55,811	8.87
27	Banka	Digvijay Singh	IND	185,762	28.48	Jay Prakash Narayan Yadav	RJD	157,046	24.08	28,716	4.40
28	Munger	Lalan Singh	JD(U)	374,317	57.50	Ram Badan Roy	RJD	184,956	28.41	189,361	29.09
29	Nalanda	Kaushalendra Kumar	JD(U)	299,155	52.65	Satish Kumar Yadav	LJP	146,478	25.78	152,677	26.87
30	Patna Sahib	Shatrughan Sinha	BJP	316,549	57.30	Vijay Kumar	RJD	149,779	27.11	166,770	30.19
31	Pataliputra	Ranjan Prasad Yadav	JD(U)	269,298	42.86	Lalu Prasad Yadav	RJD	245,757	39.12	23,541	3.74
32	Arrah	Meena Singh	JD(U)	212,726	38.24	Rama Kishore Singh	LJP	138,006	24.81	74,720	13.43
33	Buxar	Jagada Nand Singh	RJD	132,614	21.27	Lalmuni Chaubey	BJP	130,376	20.91	2,238	0.36
34	Sasaram	Meira Kumar	INC	192,213	32.09	Muni Lall	BJP	149,259	24.92	42,954	7.17
35	Karakat	Mahabali Singh	JD(U)	196,946	34.13	Kanti Singh	RJD	176,463	30.58	20,483	3.55
36	Jahanabad	Jagdish Sharma	JD(U)	234,769	39.18	Surendra Prasad Yadav	RJD	213,442	35.62	21,327	3.56
37	Aurangabad	Sushil Kumar Singh	JD(U)	260,153	43.48	Shakeel Ahmad Khan	RJD	188,095	31.44	72,058	12.04
38	Gaya	Hari Manjhi	BJP	246,255	43.65	Ramji Manjhi	RJD	183,802	32.58	62,453	11.07
39	Nawada	Bhola Singh	BJP	130,608	22.46	Veena Devi	LJP	95,691	16.45	34,917	6.01
40	Jamui	Bhudeo Choudhary	JD(U)	178,560	33.36	Shyam Rajak	RJD	148,763	27.79	29,797	5.57

=== Bye-elections ===
- The Banka Lok Sabha bypoll was held because the sitting MP Digvijay Singh died following a brain haemorrhage at a London hospital on 20 June 2010, which caused the seat to fall vacant.
- The Maharajganj Lok Sabha bypoll was held because the sitting MP Umashankar Singh died on 26 April 2013, resulting in the seat falling vacant.

No.	Constituency	Elected M.P	Party
27	Banka	Putul Kumari (Elected in bypoll 2010)	Independent
19	Maharajganj	Prabhunath Singh (Elected in bypoll 2013)	Rashtriya Janata Dal

== Assembly segments wise lead of Parties ==
Party		Assembly segments
NDA	JD(U)	110
NDA	BJP	65
NDA	Total	175
Fourth Front	RJD	33
Fourth Front	LJP	5
Fourth Front	Total	38
UPA	INC	10
UPA	NCP	3
UPA	Total	13
Others	CPI	3
Others	BSP	2
Others	CPI(M)	1
Others	CPI(ML)L	1
Others	Independent	10
Others	Total	17
Total		243
