= 2004 Indian general election in Bihar =

- April–May 2004

40 seats
- Turnout: 58.02%
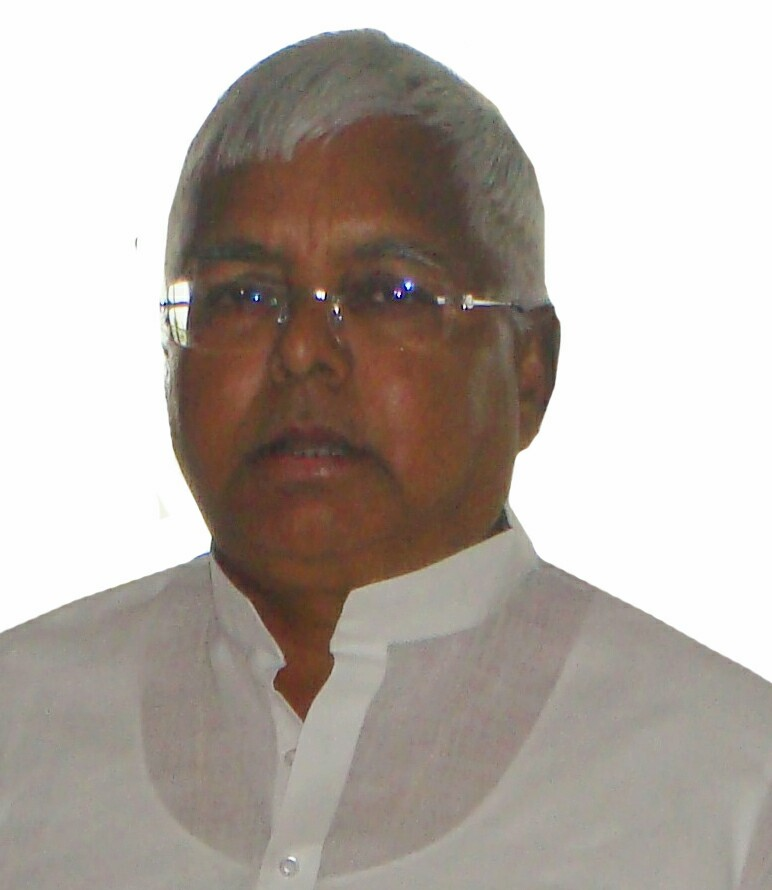

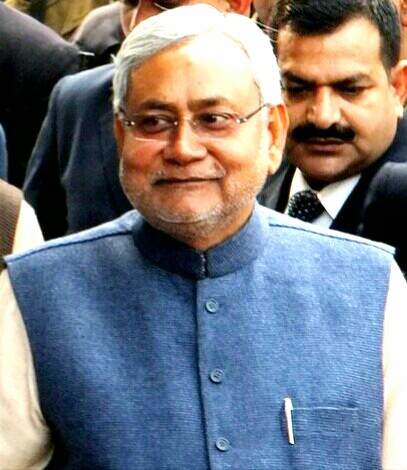

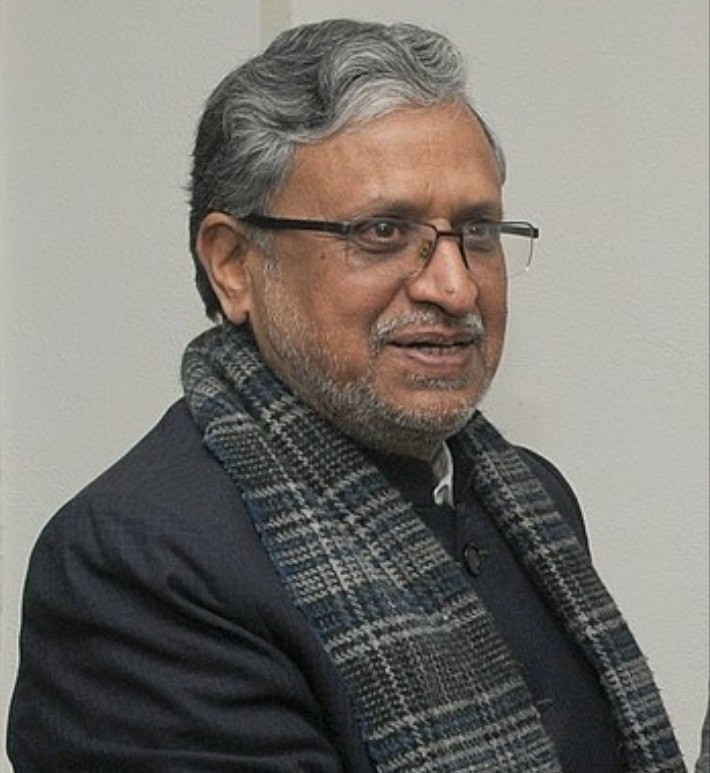

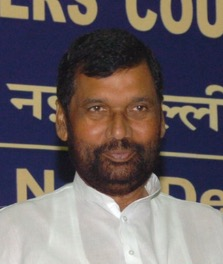
	First party	Second party	Third party
Leader	Lalu Prasad Yadav	Nitish Kumar	Sushil Kumar Modi
Party	RJD	JDU	BJP
Alliance	UPA	NDA	NDA
Leader's seat	Chhapra (won)	Nalanda (won)	Bhagalpur (won)
Seats before	7	18	23
Seats won	22	6	5
Seat change	▲15	▼12	▼18
Popular vote	8,994,821	6,558,538	4,272,195
Percentage	30.67	22.36%	14.57%
Swing	▲2.38%	▲1.59%	▼8.44%
	Fourth party	Fifth party
		INC
Leader	Ram Vilas Paswan	Ramjatan Sinha
Party	LJP	INC
Alliance	UPA	UPA
Leader's seat	Hajipur (won)	Did not contest
Seats before	-	4
Seats won	4	3
Seat change	New	▼1
Popular vote	2,402,603	1,315,935
Percentage	8.19	4.49%
Swing	New	▼4.32%
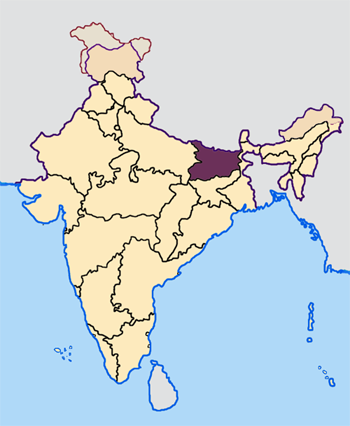
- Bihar
Prime Minister before election
Atal Bihari Vajpayee
BJP
Prime Minister after election
Manmohan Singh
INC

The 2004 Indian general election in Bihar was held in April to May of that year.

Lok Janshakti, a party with strong support amongst Dalit communities, were allotted eight seats. NCP and CPI(M) were allotted one seat each. RJD itself contested 26 seats.

Two large non-NDA parties in the state, CPI and CPI(ML) Liberation, did not join the Lalu-led front but contested individually. CPI(ML)L contested 21 seats and CPI six.

The NDA front consisted of BJP and JD(U). The alliance was threatened at several points, over disagreements on seat-sharing formulas. In the end JD(U) contested 24 seats and BJP 16.

BSP contested all 40 seats and SP 32 on their own, unsuccessfully. Lok Janshakti held sway over Dalit votes and RJD over Yadav votes, thus making it impossible for the Uttar Pradesh-based caste parties to make a breakthrough in the state.

The result was an overwhelming victory for the Laloo-led coalition. It won 29 seats. The rest went to the BJP-JD(U) combine.

Voting in the state was confronted with many irregularities, and repolling was ordered in four constituencies.

== Schedule ==
The schedule of the election was announced by the Election Commission of India on 29 February 2004.

Poll event	Phase		
Poll event	1	2	3
Date of announcement	29 February 2004		
Notification date	24 March 2004	31 March 2004	8 April 2004
Last date for filing nomination	31 March 2004	7 April 2004	15 April 2004
Scrutiny of nomination	2 April 2004	8 April 2004	16 April 2004
Last date for withdrawal of nomination	5 April 2004	10 April 2004	19 April 2004
Date of poll	20 April 2004	26 April 2004	5 May 2004
Date of counting of votes	13 May 2004		
No. of constituencies	11	17	12

== Parties and alliances ==
=== United Progressive Alliance ===
United Progressive Alliance
Party	Flag	Symbol	Leader	Seats
Rashtriya Janata Dal			Lalu Prasad Yadav	26
Lok Janshakti Party			Ram Vilas Paswan	8
Indian National Congress			Ramjatan Sinha	4
Communist Party of India (Marxist)			Subodh Roy	1
Nationalist Congress Party			Tariq Anwar	1
Total				40

=== National Democratic Alliance ===
National Democratic Alliance
Party	Flag	Symbol	Leader	Seats
Janata Dal (United)			Nitish Kumar	24
Bharatiya Janata Party			Sushil Modi	16
Total				40

== Candidates ==
Constituency		UPA		NDA	
#	Name	Party	Candidate	Party	Candidate
1	Bagaha (SC)	LJP	Hiralal Ram	JD(U)	Kailash Baitha
2	Bettiah	RJD	Raghunath Jha	BJP	Madan Prasad Jaiswal
3	Motihari	RJD	Akhilesh Prasad Singh	BJP	Radha Mohan Singh
4	Gopalganj	RJD	Sadhu Yadav	JD(U)	Prabhu Dayal Singh
5	Siwan	RJD	Shahabuddin	JD(U)	Om Prakash Yadav
6	Maharajganj	RJD	Jitendra Swami	JD(U)	Prabhunath Singh
7	Chapra	RJD	Lalu Prasad Yadav	BJP	Rajiv Pratap Rudy
8	Hajipur (SC)	LJP	Ram Vilas Paswan	JD(U)	Chhedi Paswan
9	Vaishali	RJD	Raghuvansh Singh	JD(U)	Harendra Kumar
10	Muzaffarpur	RJD	Bhagwan Lal Sahani	JD(U)	George Fernandes
11	Sitamarhi	RJD	Sitaram Yadav	JD(U)	Nawal Kishore Rai
12	Sheohar	RJD	Sitaram Singh	BJP	Md. Anwarul Haque
13	Madhubani	INC	Shakeel Ahmad	BJP	Hukmdev Narayan Yadav
14	Jhanjharpur	RJD	Devendra Prasad Yadav	JD(U)	Jagannath Mishra
15	Darbhanga	RJD	Ali Ashraf Fatmi	BJP	Kirti Azad
16	Rosera (SC)	LJP	Ram Chandra Paswan	JD(U)	Dasai Chowdhary
17	Samastipur	RJD	Alok Kumar Mehta	JD(U)	Ram Chandra Singh
18	Barh	RJD	Vijay Krishna	JD(U)	Nitish Kumar
19	Balia	LJP	Surajbhan Singh	JD(U)	Ram Jeevan Singh
20	Saharsa	LJP	Ranjeet Ranjan	JD(U)	Dinesh Chandra Yadav
21	Madhepura	RJD	Lalu Prasad Yadav	JD(U)	Sharad Yadav
22	Araria (SC)	LJP	Ram Sewak Hazari	BJP	Sukdeo Paswan
23	Kishanganj	RJD	Taslimuddin	BJP	Syed Shahnawaz Hussain
24	Purnia	LJP	Pappu Yadav	BJP	Uday Singh
25	Katihar	NCP	Tariq Anwar	BJP	Nikhil Kumar Choudhary
26	Banka	RJD	Giridhari Yadav	JD(U)	Digvijay Singh
27	Bhagalpur	CPM	Subodh Roy	BJP	Sushil Modi
28	Khagaria	RJD	Rabindra Kumar Rana	JD(U)	Renu Kumari
29	Munger	RJD	Jay Prakash Yadav	JD(U)	Monazir Hassan
30	Begusarai	INC	Krishna Sahi	JD(U)	Lalan Singh
31	Nalanda	LJP	Pushpanjay Kumar	JD(U)	Nitish Kumar
32	Patna	RJD	Ram Kripal Yadav	BJP	C. P. Thakur
33	Arrah	RJD	Kanti Singh	JD(U)	Ashok Kumar Verma
34	Buxar	RJD	Shivanand Tiwari	BJP	Lalmuni Chaubey
35	Sasaram (SC)	INC	Meira Kumar	BJP	Muni Lall
36	Bikramganj	RJD	Ram Prasad Singh	JD(U)	Ajit Kumar Singh
37	Aurangabad	INC	Nikhil Kumar	JD(U)	Sushil Kumar Singh
38	Jahanabad	RJD	Ganesh Yadav	JD(U)	Arun Kumar
39	Nawada (SC)	RJD	Virchandra Paswan	BJP	Sanjay Paswan
40	Gaya (SC)	RJD	Rajesh Kumar Manjhi	BJP	Balbir Chand

== Voting and results ==
=== Results by alliance or party ===
Alliance/ Party		Popular vote			Seats		
Alliance/ Party		Votes	%	±pp	Contested	Won	+/−
UPA	RJD	89,94,821	30.67		26	22	▲16
UPA	LJP	24,02,603	8.19		8	4	▲4
UPA	INC	13,15,935	4.49		4	3	▲1
UPA	NCP	2,86,357	0.98		1	0	Steady
UPA	CPI(M)	2,27,298	0.77		1	0	▼1
UPA	Total	1,32,27,014	45.10		40	29	
NDA	JD(U)	65,58,538	22.36		24	6	▼12
NDA	BJP	42,72,195	14.57		16	5	▼7
NDA	Total	1,08,30,733	36.93		40	11	
BSP		10,50,484	3.58		40	0	
CPI(M-L)L		7,05,783	2.41		21	0	
SP		6,84,200	2.33		32	0	
CPI		3,43,926	1.17		6	0	
Others		5,55,749	1.88	Steady	83	0	Steady
IND		19,31,555	6.59		200	0	
Total		2,93,29,444	100%	–	462	40	–

Note: In 1999, before Jharkhand was created as a separate state, Bihar had 54 constituencies.

=== Results by constituency ===
Constituency		Winner				Runner Up				Margin	%
#	Name	Candidate	Party	Votes	%	Candidate	Party	Votes	%	Margin	%
1	Bagaha (SC)	Kailash Baitha	JD(U)	237,989	41.69	Hiralal Ram	LJP	172,614	30.24	65,375	11.45
2	Bettiah	Raghunath Jha	RJD	211,590	37.13	Madan Prasad Jaiswal	BJP	186,919	32.80	24,671	4.33
3	Motihari	Akhilesh Pr. Singh	RJD	348,596	51.33	Radha Mohan Singh	BJP	251,572	37.05	97,024	14.29
4	Gopalganj	Sadhu Yadav	RJD	336,016	48.38	Prabhu Dayal Singh	JD(U)	143,097	20.60	192,919	27.78
5	Siwan	Mhd. Shahabuddin	RJD	317,511	49.80	Om Prakash Yadav	JD(U)	213,933	33.56	103,578	16.25
6	Maharajganj	Prabhunath Singh	JD(U)	283,506	42.67	Jitendra Swami	RJD	237,041	35.68	46,465	6.99
7	Chapra	Lalu Prasad Yadav	RJD	228,882	51.31	Rajiv Pratap Rudy	BJP	168,459	37.76	60,423	13.54
8	Hajipur (SC)	Ram Vilas Paswan	LJP	477,495	61.72	Chhedi Paswan	JD(U)	239,694	30.98	237,801	30.74
9	Vaishali	Raghuvansh Prs Singh	RJD	361,503	48.28	Vijay Kumar Shukla	IND	255,568	34.13	105,935	14.15
10	Muzaffarpur	George Fernandes	JD(U)	370,127	47.20	Bhagwan Lal Sahani	RJD	360,434	45.97	9,693	1.24
11	Sitamarhi	Sitaram Yadav	RJD	326,165	47.21	Nawal Kishore Rai	JD(U)	228,160	33.03	98,005	14.19
12	Sheohar	Sitaram Singh	RJD	303,243	45.50	Md Anwarul Haque	BJP	229,360	34.42	73,883	11.09
13	Madhubani	Shakeel Ahmad	INC	328,182	47.21	Hukmdev Yadav	BJP	241,103	34.68	87,079	12.53
14	Jhanjharpur	Devendra Prasad Yadav	RJD	323,400	45.92	Jagannath Mishra	JD(U)	310,565	44.10	12,835	1.82
15	Darbhanga	Mhd. Ali Ashraf Fatmi	RJD	427,672	56.08	Kirti Azad	BJP	284,209	37.27	143,463	18.81
16	Rosera (SC)	Ram Chandra Paswan	LJP	394,240	55.23	Dasai Chowdhary	JD(U)	255,829	35.84	138,411	19.39
17	Samastipur	Alok Kumar Mehta	RJD	437,457	50.59	Ram Chandra Singh	JD(U)	310,674	35.93	126,783	14.66
18	Barh	Vijay Krishna	RJD	426,856	49.40	Nitish Kumar	JD(U)	389,168	45.04	37,688	4.36
19	Balia	Suraj Singh	LJP	233,869	36.98	Shatrughna Prs. Singh	CPI	157,642	24.93	76,227	12.05
20	Saharsa	Ranjeet Ranjan	LJP	350,426	47.47	Dinesh Chandra Yadav	JD(U)	319,639	43.30	30,787	4.17
21	Madhepura	Lalu Prasad Yadav	RJD	344,301	49.49	Sharad Yadav	JD(U)	274,314	39.43	69,987	10.06
22	Araria (SC)	Sukdeo Paswan	BJP	216,677	33.21	Ramjidas Rishidev	SP	188,933	28.96	27,744	4.25
23	Kishanganj	Mhd. Taslimuddin	RJD	420,331	51.68	Shahnawaz Hussain	BJP	259,834	31.95	160,497	19.73
24	Purnea	Uday Singh	BJP	244,426	34.47	Pappu Yadav	LJP	231,543	32.66	12,883	1.82
25	Katihar	Nikhil Kumar Ch.	BJP	288,922	41.01	Tariq Anwar	NCP	286,357	40.65	2,565	0.36
26	Banka	Giridhari Yadav	RJD	339,880	47.61	Digvijay Singh	JD(U)	335,211	46.96	4,669	0.65
27	Bhagalpur	Sushil Kumar Modi	BJP	345,151	45.58	Subodh Ray	CPI(M)	227,298	30.01	117,853	15.56
28	Khagaria	Rabindra Kumar Rana	RJD	322,440	47.70	Renu Kushawaha	JD(U)	255,317	37.77	67,123	9.93
29	Monghyr	Jay Prakash Yadav	RJD	453,286	54.08	Monazir Hassan	JD(U)	337,359	40.25	115,927	13.83
30	Begusarai	Rajiv Ranjan Singh	JD(U)	301,562	44.43	Krishna Sahi	INC	281,071	41.42	20,491	3.02
31	Nalanda	Nitish Kumar	JD(U)	471,310	52.65	Kumar Pushpanjay	LJP	368,914	41.21	102,396	11.44
32	Patna	Ram Kripal Yadav	RJD	433,853	48.12	C. P. Thakur	BJP	395,291	43.84	38,562	4.28
33	Arrah	Kanti Singh	RJD	299,422	38.03	Ram Naresh Ram	CPI(ML)	149,679	19.01	149,743	19.02
34	Buxar	Lalmuni Chaubey	BJP	205,980	31.73	Dadan Singh	IND	151,114	23.28	54,866	8.45
35	Sasaram (SC)	Meira Kumar	INC	416,673	59.76	Muni Lall	BJP	158,411	22.72	258,262	37.04
36	Bikramganj	Ajit Kumar Singh	JD(U)	305,392	41.61	Ram Prasad Kushwaha	RJD	246,591	33.60	58,801	8.01
37	Aurangabad	Nikhil Kumar	INC	290,009	37.80	Sushil Kumar Singh	JD(U)	282,549	36.83	7,460	0.97
38	Jahanabad	Ganesh Prasad Singh	RJD	400,063	46.31	Arun Kumar	JD(U)	353,625	40.94	46,438	5.38
39	Nawada (SC)	Virchandra Paswan	RJD	489,992	48.51	Sanjay Paswan	BJP	433,986	42.97	56,006	5.54
40	Gaya (SC)	Rajesh Kumar Manjhi	RJD	464,829	52.62	Balbir Chand	BJP	361,895	40.97	102,934	11.65

== Post-election Union Council of Ministers from Bihar ==
#	Name	Constituency	Designation	Department	From	To	Party
1	Lalu Prasad Yadav	Chapra	Cabinet Minister	Railways	23 May 2004	22 May 2009	RJD
2	Ram Vilas Paswan	Hajipur (SC)	Cabinet Minister	Chemicals and Fertilizers; Steel	23 May 2004	22 May 2009	LJP
3	Raghuvansh Prasad Singh	Vaishali	Cabinet Minister	Rural Development	23 May 2004	22 May 2009	RJD
4	Meira Kumar	Sasaram (SC)	Cabinet Minister	Social Justice and Empowerment	23 May 2004	22 May 2009	INC
5	Shakeel Ahmad	Madhubani	Minister of State	Communications and Information Technology; Home Affairs	23 May 2004	22 May 2009	INC
6	Akhilesh Prasad Singh	Motihari	Minister of State	Agriculture; Food and Civil Supplies, Consumer Affairs and Public Distribution	23 May 2004	22 May 2009	RJD
7	Mohammed Taslimuddin	Kishanganj	Minister of State	Heavy Industries and Public Enterprises (Until 25 May 2004); Agriculture; Food and Civil Supplies	23 May 2004	22 May 2009	RJD
8	Jay Prakash Narayan Yadav	Munger	Minister of State	Water Resources	23 May 2004	22 May 2009	RJD
9	Mohammad Ali Ashraf Fatmi	Darbhanga	Minister of State	Human Resource Development	23 May 2004	22 May 2009	RJD
10	Kanti Singh	Arrah	Minister of State	Human Resource Development; Heavy Industries and Public Enterprises; Tourism; Culture	23 May 2004	22 May 2009	RJD
11	Raghunath Jha	Bettiah	Minister of State	Heavy Industries and Public Enterprises	6 April 2008	22 May 2009	RJD
12	Prem Chand Gupta	Rajya Sabha (Bihar)	MoS(I/C)	Ministry of Company Affairs (renamed Corporate Affairs in May 2007)	23 May 2004	22 May 2009	RJD

== Assembly segments wise lead of Parties ==
Party		Assembly segments
UPA	RJD	114
UPA	LJP	28
UPA	INC	17
UPA	NCP	4
UPA	CPI(M)	0
UPA	Total	163
NDA	JD(U)	45
NDA	BJP	28
NDA	Total	73
Others	SP	3
Others	BSP	1
Others	CPI(ML)L	1
Others	CPI	1
Others	Independent	1
Others	Total	7
Total		243
