= Mahbub Alam (politician) =

Indian politician (born 1978)

Mahboob Alam

Bihar Legislative Assembly
- In office 2015–2025
- Constituency: Balrampur

Bihar Legislative Assembly
- In office 2000–2005
- Preceded by: Dulal Chandra Goswami
- Succeeded by: Munnaf Alam
- Constituency: Barsoi

Personal details
- Born: 1956-57 (age 66–68)
- Party: Communist Party of India (Marxist–Leninist) Liberation

Mahboob Alam (born 1956/1957) is an Indian politician. He is a member of the Central Committee as well as the Bihar State Committee of the Communist Party of India (Marxist-Leninist) Liberation. He has represented the Barsoi and Balrampur constituencies in the Bihar Legislative Assembly. Since 1994, he has been arrested numerous times on accusations of murder, and was incarcerated for 17 months in the late 2000s.

== Political career ==
Alam, an agriculturist, studied up to Class XII. He contested the Barsoi seat in the 1985 Bihar Legislative Assembly election as a Communist Party of India (Marxist) candidate, finishing in second place with 14,189 votes (20.59%).

He again contested the Barsoi seat in the 1990 Bihar Legislative Assembly election as an independent, again finishing in second place with 15,495 votes (17.94%).

=== Barsoi legislator ===
Alam won the Barsoi seat in the 2000 Bihar Legislative Assembly election, standing as a CPI(ML) Liberation candidate. He got 62,644 votes (51.83%).

He retained the Barsoi seat in the February 2005 Bihar legislative election, winning 45,451 votes. However, ahead of the subsequent October 2005 Bihar Legislative Assembly election Alam was barred from contesting as his name had been deleted from the voters' list. CPI(ML) Liberation fielded Alam's younger brother Munaf Alam instead, who won the seat.

=== 2009–2014 electoral campaigns ===
CPI(ML) Liberation fielded Alam as its candidate in Katihar Lok Saba seat in the 2009 parliamentary election. He obtained 32,035 votes (4.42%).

The Barsoi constituency was abolished ahead of the 2010 Bihar Legislative Assembly election, and the Balrampur constituency was created in its stead. Alam finished in second place in Balrampur with 45,432 votes (30.85%).

Alam filed his nomination papers for the Katihar Lok Sabha seat in the 2014 parliamentary election but was arrested right after the filing. He obtained 9,461 votes (0.97%) in the election.

=== 2015 Bihar election ===
Ahead of the 2015 Bihar Legislative Assembly election Alam declared 2,296,000 Indian rupees in assets and 13 criminal cases against him. Out of the 13 cases, he declared three murder charges filed against him. Alam won the seat.

=== 2020 Assembly Election ===
In the 2020 assembly election, Alam won Balrampur Legislative Assembly seat with a 53,597 vote margin to his nearest rival Barun Kumar Jha of Vikashsheel Insaan Party (VIP). Alam got 104,489 votes, Jha got 50,892 Votes.

=== 2025 Assembly elections ===
In 2025 assembly elections, Alam lost from Balrampur Legislative Assembly securing 79,141 votes and securing third place and losing to LJP(RV) candidate Savitri Devi who secured 80,459 votes.

== Arrests ==
Alam was arrested in 1994 for the killing of the spouse of a politician from Barsoi. He was released from prison the following year.

On September 1, 2007 Alam was arrested by plainclothes police at a meeting in Shankula, after a long period as a fugitive from the law. According to police, he was wanted in connection with numerous cases of murders, rioting, and other infractions of the Arms Act. According to CPI(ML) Liberation, Alam had been falsely framed for murder. A bandh (shutdown) was organized in the Barsoi bloc to protest the arrest and demonstrations were held across the state demanding his release. He was later released on bail after 17 months of incarceration.

Police arrested Alam in connection with a murder charge just after he filed his nomination papers for the Katihar Lok Sabha seat in the 2014 parliamentary election.

On July 30, 2016, Mahbub Alam was booked for slapping the branch manager of a bank in Bihar's Katihar district.
