= Barsoi Assembly constituency =

Former constituency of the Bihar legislative assembly in India

Coordinates: 25°39′05″N 87°55′21″E

Barsoi
- Former constituency for the Bihar Legislative Assembly

Constituency details
- Country: India
- Region: East India
- State: Bihar
- District: Katihar
- Lok Sabha constituency: Katihar
- Established: 1967
- Abolished: 2008

Barsoi Assembly constituency was an assembly constituency in Katihar district in the Indian state of Bihar.

It was part of Katihar Lok Sabha constituency.

This constituency ceased to exist in 2010 with the implementation of the Delimitation Commission of India recommendations. Most of the area under the erstwhile Barsoi Assembly constituency seat now falls under Balrampur, Bihar Assembly constituency since 2010.

== Members of Vidhan Sabha ==
Year	Name	Party
1967	Sohan Lal Jain	Jan Kranti Dal
1969	Sohan Lal Jain	Independent
1972	Beula Doza	Indian National Congress
1977	Abu Nayeem Chand	Independent
1980	Beula Doza	Indian National Congress (I)
1985	Beula Doza	Indian National Congress
1990	Mohammed Siddiqui	Janata Dal
1995	Dulal Chandra Goswami	Bharatiya Janata Party
2000	Mahbub Alam	Communist Party of India (Marxist–Leninist) Liberation
2005	Mahbub Alam	Communist Party of India (Marxist–Leninist) Liberation
2005	Munnaf Alam	Communist Party of India (Marxist–Leninist) Liberation
2010 onwards: Constituency does not exist
