= Purnendu Sekhar Mukherjee =

Maoist politician (died 2021)

Purnendu Sekhar Mukherjee (died 7 August 2021) or Jhantu Mukherjee commonly known by his alias Sahab Da was an Indian Maoist politician and Central Committee member of Communist Party of India (Maoist).

== Life and political career ==
Mukherjee hailed from North 24 Parganas district in Indian state of West Bengal. He joined the Naxalite movement in late 1960s and became the leader of the Maoist Communist Centre of India (MCC). Along with Akhil Ghosh he formed a new outfit, Revolutionary Communist Centre (Maoist) in 1998. Later it merged with the MCC. After the merging of MCC and Communist Party of India (Marxist–Leninist) People's War in 2007 he became the Secretary of the Eastern Regional Bureau of CPI (Maoist). He had been appointed in-charge of the Urban Sub Committee (USCOM), spearheading party activities in Delhi, Kolkata and Mumbai. Mukherjee was also known as Joy Da in the party. There are 10 cases against Mukherjee in Chhattisgarh and he was wanted by the police of several Maoist hit states, including Andhra Pradesh, Orissa, Bihar, Jharkhand. Before the arrest he also looked after the Party's military wing, People Liberation Guerrilla Army. On 29 April 2011, Special Task Force of Bihar Police arrested Mukherjee along with two other senior Maoist leaders Vijay Kumar Arya and Varanasi Subramanyam from Sheetgaon village under Barsoi police station of Katihar district. Mukherjee was sent to Special Central Jail in Bhagalpur. After the release on bail in 2015 he was engaged in civil liberty movement.

Mukherjee died on 7 August 2021 in Kolkata.
