= Vijay Kumar Arya =

Indian maoist

- Known for: A cadre and Central Committee member of the CPI (Maoist)

Vijay Kumar Arya alias Dilip alias Jaspal is an Indian Maoist ideologue and Central Committee member of Communist Party of India (Maoist)

== Career ==
Arya belongs to Karma village under Konch area in Gaya district. His father name is Ram Jatan Yadav. He is a postgraduate in economics from Magadh University. Initially he was a political worker with close affinity to Lalu Prasad Yadav thereafter attracted to left wing extremism. Arya had also worked as a temporary lecturer before he joined in the active politics. He joined in Maoist Communist Centre of India (MCCI) and led armed conflicts with Ranvir Sena. After the death of MCCI supremo Sagar Chatterjee in an encounter, the police raided the village and destroyed Arya's shanty. Thereafter Arya went underground. After the formation of CPI (Maoist) in 2004 he joined the party and became active in Bihar, Jharkhand, Uttar Pradesh and undivided Andhra Pradesh to spread Maoist ideologies. Arya was known as Jaspalji alias Amar and was chairman of the Party's all-India subcommittee of mass organisation (Sucomo). He was arrested on 1 May 2011 along with two other Central Committee Member of CPI (Maoist) Jhantu Mukherjee and Varanasi Subramanyam from a village under Barsoi block in Katihar district by the Special Task Force and Bihar Police team and was lodged in Central jail of Gaya. Total 12 criminal cases are pending against him in Bihar and he carried Rs 3 lakh award on his head. At present Arya is in Special Central Jail in Bhagalpur.
