= Varanasi Subramanyam =

Maoist politician

Varanasi Subramanyam commonly known by his nom de guerre Sukanth alias Vimal is an Indian Maoist and Central Committee member of Communist Party of India (Maoist)

== Career ==
Subramanyam hails from Prakasam district of Andhra Pradesh. He is the son of an eminent lawyer. He studied M.Com. and Master of Law from Andhra University. Andhra Pradesh government had announced a cash reward of Rupees 12 lakh for Subramanyam's capture. He joined in the Central Committee in 2001 and helmed the outfit of International cell of the party after the arrest of Kobad Ghandy. Subramayam was entrusted with the responsibility of guiding the Delhi State Committee of CPI (Maoist). On 29 April 2011 Bihar Police and Special Task Force arrested seven people in Barsoi area of Katihar district along with Varanasi Subramanyam and other two Central Committee Member Jhantu Mukherjee and Vijay Kumar Arya. According to the police, Subramanyam and two others are wanted in 17 cases of murder and criminal conspiracy in Andhra Pradesh, Chhattisgarh, Orissa and Bihar. He is in special central jail in Bhagalpur district. In September 2011 Subramanyam in a letter to the Government official offered to donate his body for medical research institute only in West Bengal.
