= Tariq Anwar =

Tariq Anwar may refer to:

- Tariq Anwar (politician) (born 1951), Indian politician
- Tariq Anwar (film editor) (born 1945), film editor
