= Bharri =

Bharri is a village situated in the northeastern Bihar district of Katihar. It is under the constituency of Kadwa. Its sub-divisional office is at Barsoi and Block Development Officer is at Kumhari.

This village has a hospital, a post office and also a panchayat office which is headed by people elected member called Mukhiya (Who is responsible to check all the development in the Panchayat) and a sarpanch (who is responsible to check all the issue related to crime and its settlement). Surendra Nath Thakur from Thakur family has served as mukhiya of this village for 23 years. Present mukhiya is Vinodanand Shah. There is a telephone communication to district headquarters Katihar and as well as sub-divisional office Barsoi and also have electricity and road communication.

It is 11 km from Sonaili Railway Station and 38 kilometers from Katihar district headquarters towards north-west direction. It is famous for its unique Chhath Puja celebrations. There is an ancient temple of God Maharaja (the King). People pray god Maharaja and it is located outskirts of the village. There is also a Durga Mandir.

This village has a rich educational background like few doctors, few engineers working in different domains all over India, One Professor in India's famous University JNU and One is in Jindal International University, 3–5 serving/served the Indian Railway, 6 block teachers and 3 panchayat teachers in Bharri.

== Castes ==
Bharri is the home of castes such as Dhanuk, Brahmin, Mahto, Mehta, Suri, Rajput, (Carpenter), Nai, Dhobi, Chamar.

== School ==
- Government Middley School (Bharri, Badabad)

== Temples ==
- Bajrang Bali Sthan
- Durga mandir
- Kali Sthan
- Maharaj Sthan

== Mosque ==
Bharri
