= Shah Zohair =

Member of the Bihar Legislative Assembly
- In office 1967–1972
- Preceded by: Budhan Mehta
- Succeeded by: Rang Bahadur Singh
- Constituency: Arwal

Personal details
- Party: Communist Party of India

Shah Zohair was an Indian politician who has been Member of the Bihar Legislative Assembly from the Arwal Assembly constituency for 2 consecutive terms he was elected in 1967 and in 1969 being associated with the Communist Party of India. He was the younger brother of Shah Muhammad Umair, Former Rajya Sabha Member and Shah Mohammad Zubair, grandfather of Tariq Anwar, Former Member of the Lok Sabha.
