= Punam Paswan =

Indian politician

Punam Kumari, nee Paswan, (born 1979) is an Indian politician from Bihar. She was a former member of the Bihar Legislative Assembly from Korha Assembly constituency which is reserved for Scheduled Caste community in Katihar district. She won the 2015 Bihar Legislative Assembly election representing the Indian National Congress.

== Early life and education ==
Paswan is from Manihari, Katihar district, Bihar. She married Bhartlal Paswan. She completed her MA in english at Magadh University, Bodh Gaya in 2015.

== Career ==
Paswan won from Korha Assembly constituency representing representing the Indian National Congress in the 2015 Bihar Legislative Assembly election. She polled 78,409 votes and defeated her nearest rival, Mahesh Paswan of the Bharatiya Janata Party, by a margin of 5,426 votes. She lost the 2020 Bihar Legislative Assembly election to Kavita Devi of the BJP. She served as Katihar district Congress president.
