= Balrampur Assembly constituency =

Balrampur Assembly constituency may refer to:

- Balrampur, Bihar Assembly constituency
- Balrampur, Uttar Pradesh Assembly constituency
- Balarampur, West Bengal Assembly constituency
