= Shakeel Ahmad Khan =

Indian politician (born 1965)

Dr. Shakeel Ahmad Khan
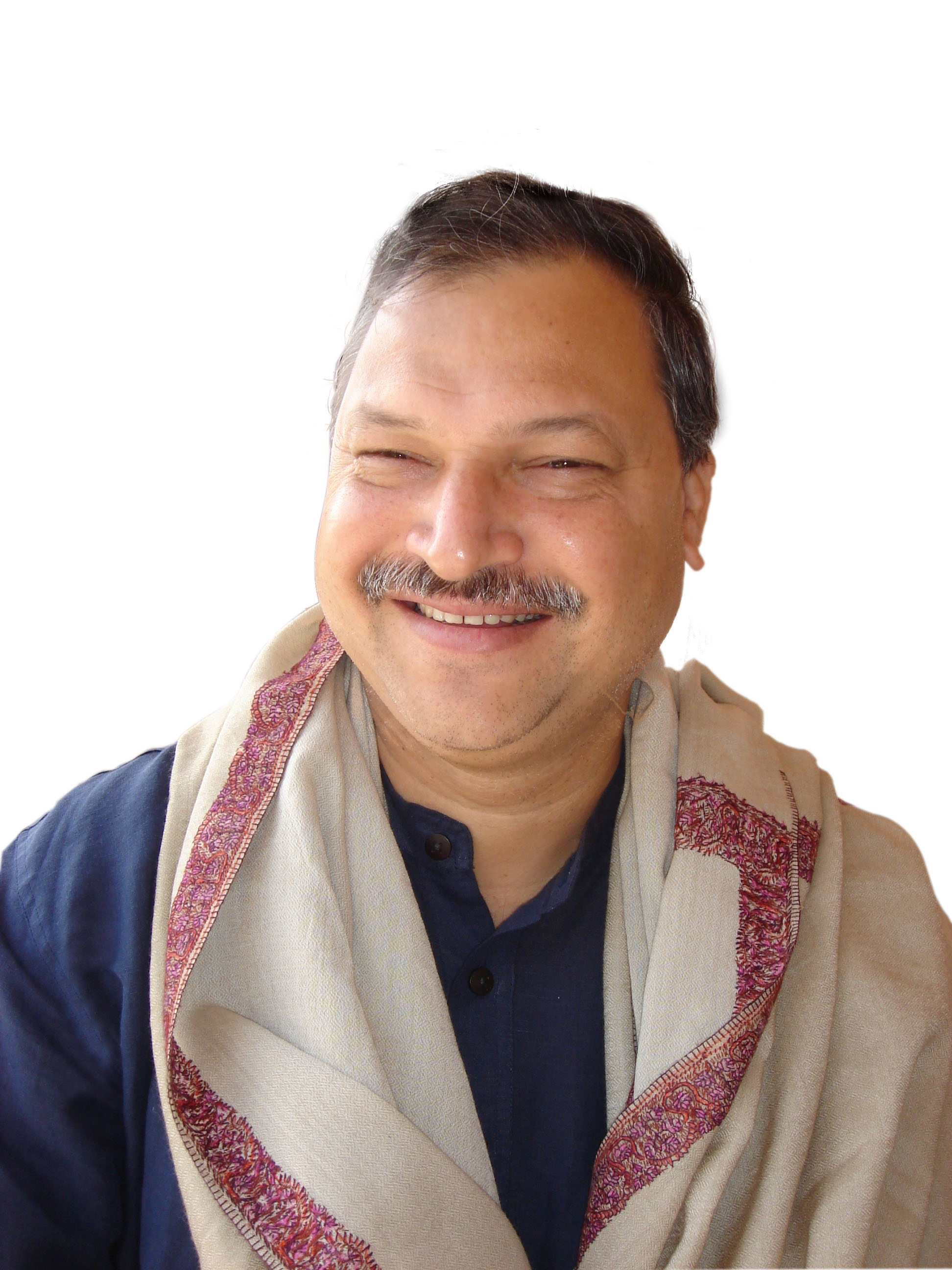

Member of the Bihar Legislative Assembly
- In office 2015–2025
- Preceded by: Bhola Ray
- Succeeded by: Dulal Chandra Goswami
- Constituency: Kadwa

Personal details
- Born: 1 January 1965 (age 61) Kabar Kothi, Katihar, Bihar
- Party: Indian National Congress
- Spouse: C.K. Khan
- Children: 1 son and 1 daughter
- Parent: Late Shoib Khan (father)
- Education: Jawaharlal Nehru University, New Delhi

Shakeel Ahmad Khan (born 1 January 1965) is a Former member of the 16th Legislative Assembly of Bihar state in India. He is a National secretary of the Indian National Congress (INC).

== Early life ==
Shakeel Ahmad Khan was born and brought up in Kabar Kothi area of Katihar District in Bihar. He got his early education at his native village. He did his graduation from Patna University. However he moved to Delhi to pursue higher studies. He continued his education at Jawaharlal Nehru University from where he obtained M.A., M.Phil. and Ph.D.

== Political career ==
Shakeel Ahmad Khan was first elected as MLA in 2015 from Kadwa assembly seat in Katihar district, Bihar. He defeated his close contestant Chandra Bhushan Thakur from Bhartiya Janata Party with a margin of 5,799 votes. Shakeel Ahmad Khan got 56,141 votes, while his opponent could manage only 50,342 votes. Kadwa Assembly constituency is one of the 243 legislative assembly constituencies of Bihar. It is in Katihar district of the state. As per the implementation of the recommendations of the Delimitation Commission of India, the Dandkhora and Kadwa community development blocks are covered by the Kadwa assembly segment.

Shakeel Ahmad Khan started his political journey as student leader. He got elected as President of Jawaharlal Nehru University Students' Union, New Delhi in the year 1992. Though he was an activist of Students' Federation of India (SFI), a student wing of Communist Party of India (Marxist), he joined Indian National Congress in 1999 and got elevated to the position of Secretary of AICC. Currently he is Party-in-Charge for the state of West Bengal.

== Posts held ==
- As a student leader Shakeel Ahmad Khan held the post of Vice-President of Jawaharlal Nehru University Students' Union in 1991-1992 and President of JNUSU in the year 1992–1993.
- Shakeel Ahmad served as Vice Chairman of Nehru Yuva Kendra Sangathan (NYKS). He was appointed Director General of NYKS by UPA-I government in the year 2005. Nehru Yuva Kendra Sangathan is the largest youth body of its kind in the world which is an autonomous organization under the Ministry of Youth Affairs and Sports, Government of India.
