= Dighari =

Dighari is a village in Katihar district, Bihar state, India, 6 kilometres (3.7 mi) from Katihar.
