= Manihari Assembly constituency =

Coordinates: 25°21′N 87°38′E

Manihari
- Constituency No. 67 for the Bihar Legislative Assembly

Constituency details
- Country: India
- Region: East India
- State: Bihar
- District: Katihar
- Lok Sabha constituency: Katihar
- Established: 1951
- Total electors: 297,676
- Reservation: ST

Member of Legislative Assembly
- 18th Bihar Legislative Assembly
- Incumbent Manohar Prasad Singh
- Party: INC
- Alliance: MGB
- Elected year: 2025
- Preceded by: Vishwanath Singh

Manihari Assembly constituency is an assembly constituency in Katihar district in the Indian state of Bihar. It is reserved for scheduled tribes now, but earlier was an open seat.

== Overview ==
As per Delimitation of Parliamentary and Assembly constituencies Order, 2008, No 67. Manihari Assembly constituency (ST) is composed of the following: Manihari, Mansahi and Amdabad community development blocks.

Manihari Assembly constituency is part of No 11 Katihar Lok Sabha constituency. Muslims, particularly Shershabadias, are the largest community in this constituency with 41% of the population in 2011. Scheduled Castes and Scheduled Tribes made up 7% and 13% of the population in 2011.

== Members of the Legislative Assembly ==
| Year | Name | Party |
|---|---|---|
| 1952 | Parwathi Devi | Indian National Congress |
| 1957 | Yuvraj | Praja Socialist Party |
| 1962 | Yuvraj | Praja Socialist Party |
| 1967 | Yuvraj | Praja Socialist Party |
| 1972 | Yuvraj | Samyukta Socialist Party |
| 1977 | Ram Sipahi Yadav | Janata Party |
| 1980 | Ram Sipahi Yadav | Janata Party |
| 1985 | Mubarak Hussain | Indian National Congress |
| 1990 | Vishwanath Singh | Janata Dal |
| 1995 | Mubarak Hussain | Indian National Congress |
| 2000 | Vishwanath Singh | Janata Dal (United) |
| 2005 | Mubarak Hussain | Indian National Congress |
| 2005* | Mubarak Hussain | Indian National Congress |
| 2006^ | Vishwanath Singh | Janata Dal (United) |
| 2010 | Manohar Prasad Singh | Janata Dal (United) |
| 2015 | Manohar Prasad Singh | Indian National Congress |
| 2020 | Manohar Prasad Singh | Indian National Congress |
| 2025 | Manohar Prasad Singh | Indian National Congress |

*Two elections took place in 2005, one in February and one in October

^denotes by-elections

== Election results ==
=== 2025 ===
2025 Bihar Legislative Assembly election: Manihari
| Party | Candidate | Votes | % | ±% |
|---|---|---|---|---|
| INC | Manohar Prasad Singh | 114,754 | 48.16 | +2.35 |
| JD(U) | Shambhu Prasad | 99,586 | 41.8 | +7.69 |
| JSP | Bablu Soren | 7,647 | 3.21 | |
| NCP | Saif Ali Khan | 4,865 | 2.04 | |
| RLJP | Ram Ratan Prasad | 3,761 | 1.58 | |
| AAP | Nalinee Mandal | 2,738 | 1.15 | |
| NOTA | None of the above | 2,941 | 1.23 | −0.68 |
| Majority | | 15,168 | 6.36 | −5.34 |
| Turnout | | 238,259 | 80.04 | +16.94 |
| INC hold | | Swing | | |

=== 2020 ===
2020 Bihar Legislative Assembly election: Manihari
| Party | Candidate | Votes | % | ±% |
|---|---|---|---|---|
| INC | Manohar Prasad Singh | 83,032 | 45.81 | +7.12 |
| JD(U) | Shambhu Suman | 61,823 | 34.11 | |
| LJP | Anil Kumar Oraon | 20,441 | 11.28 | −18.84 |
| Independent | Rameshwar Hembram | 2,568 | 1.42 | |
| AIMIM | Goreti Murmu | 2,475 | 1.37 | |
| Independent | Shobha Soren | 1,840 | 1.02 | |
| Independent | Minakshi Shweta | 1,667 | 0.92 | |
| NOTA | None of the above | 3,456 | 1.91 | +1.14 |
| Majority | | 21,209 | 11.7 | +3.13 |
| Turnout | | 181,260 | 63.1 | −1.3 |
| INC hold | | Swing | | |

=== 2015 ===
2015 Bihar Legislative Assembly election: Manihari
| Party | Candidate | Votes | % | ±% |
|---|---|---|---|---|
| INC | Manohar Prasad Singh | 61,704 | 38.69 | |
| LJP | Anil Kumar Oraon | 48,024 | 30.12 | |
| NCP | Gita Kisku | 7,009 | 4.4 | |
| SS | Nagendra Chandra Mandal | 6,134 | 3.85 | |
| Independent | Shambhu Kumar Suman | 6,123 | 3.84 | |
| Independent | Champay Kisku | 5,723 | 3.59 | |
| CPI | Anirudh Prasad Singh | 5,129 | 3.22 | |
| Independent | Braj Lal Soren | 2,976 | 1.87 | |
| JAP(L) | Lila Madi | 1,972 | 1.24 | |
| BSP | Abhilashita Uraon | 1,881 | 1.18 | |
| Independent | Nirma Devi | 1,873 | 1.17 | |
| SDPI | Prabhulal Uraon | 1,817 | 1.14 | |
| JMM | Fulmani Hembram | 1,779 | 1.12 | |
| NOTA | None of the above | 1,233 | 0.77 | |
| Majority | | 13,680 | 8.57 | |
| Turnout | | 159,465 | 64.4 | |

=== 2010 ===
In the 2010 state assembly elections, Manohar Prasad Singh of JD(U) won the Minihari (ST) assembly seat defeating his nearest rival Gita Kisku of NCP. Contests in most years were multi cornered but only winners and runners up are being mentioned. In the Manihari open constituency Mubarak Hussain of Congress defeated Vishwanath Singh of JD(U) in October 2005 and Sagir Ahmad of NCP in February 2005. Vishwanath Singh of JD(U) defeated Sagir Ahmad of NCP in 2000. Mubarak Hussain of Congress defeated Viswanath Singh of JD in 1995. Viswanath Singh of JD defeated Mubarak Hussain of Congress in 1990. Mubarak Hussain of Congress defeated Ram Sipahi Yadav of JP in 1985. Ram Sipahi Yadav of Janata Party (JP) defeated Mubarak Hussain of Congress in 1980. Ram Sipahi Yadav of JP defeated Amarnath Singh Yadav of Congress in 1977.
