= Korha Assembly constituency =

Coordinates: 25°37′N 87°24′E

Korha
- Constituency No. 69 for the Bihar Legislative Assembly

Constituency details
- Country: India
- Region: East India
- State: Bihar
- District: Katihar
- Established: 1967
- Total electors: 298,867
- Reservation: SC

Member of Legislative Assembly
- 18th Bihar Legislative Assembly
- Incumbent Kavita Devi
- Party: BJP
- Alliance: NDA
- Elected year: 2025

Korha is an assembly constituency in Katihar district in the Indian state of Bihar. It is reserved for scheduled castes.

== Overview ==
As per Delimitation of Parliamentary and Assembly constituencies Order, 2008, No 69. Korha Assembly constituency (SC) is composed of the following: Korha and Falka community development blocks.

Korha Assembly constituency is part of No 12 Purnia (Lok Sabha constituency).

== Members of the Legislative Assembly ==
Year	Name	Party
1967	Bhola Paswan Shastri	Indian National Congress
1969	Bhola Paswan Shastri	Lok Tantrik Congress
1972	Bhola Paswan Shastri	Indian National Congress
1977	Sita Ram Das	Janata Party
1980	Vishwanath Rishi	Indian National Congress (I)
1985	Vishwanath Rishi	Indian National Congress
1990	Sita Ram Das	Janata Dal
1995	Sita Ram Das	Janata Dal
2000	Mahesh Paswan	Bharatiya Janata Party
2005	Sunita Devi	Indian National Congress
2005	Sunita Devi	Indian National Congress
2010	Mahesh Paswan	Bharatiya Janata Party
2015	Punam Paswan	Indian National Congress
2020	Kavita Devi	Bharatiya Janata Party
2025	Kavita Devi	Bharatiya Janata Party

== Election results ==
=== 2025 ===
2025 Bihar Legislative Assembly election: Korha
Party	Candidate	Votes	%	±%
BJP	Kavita Devi	123,495	51.82	−1.49
INC	Punam Paswan	101,238	42.48	+3.92
JSP	Nirmal Kumar Raj	4,028	1.69	
NOTA	None of the above	3,162	1.33	−0.59
Majority		22,257	9.34	−5.41
Turnout		238,305	79.74	+12.35
BJP hold		Swing		

=== 2020 ===
2020 Bihar Legislative Assembly election: Korha
Party	Candidate	Votes	%	±%
BJP	Kavita Devi	104,625	53.31	+10.93
INC	Punam Paswan	75,682	38.56	−6.97
JAP(L)	Wakil Das	3,654	1.86	+1.06
RLSP	Lalit Kumar	2,151	1.1	
NOTA	None of the above	3,764	1.92	−0.3
Majority		28,943	14.75	+11.6
Turnout		196,260	67.39	−2.27
BJP gain from INC		Swing		

=== 2015 ===
2015 Bihar Legislative Assembly election: Korha
Party	Candidate	Votes	%	±%
INC	Punam Kumari Alias Punam Paswan	78,409	45.53	
BJP	Mahesh Paswan	72,983	42.38	
CPI(M)	Jay Prakash Rishi	3,719	2.16	
Independent	Lalit Kumar	3,199	1.86	
NCP	Sunita Devi	2,097	1.22	
BSP	Ravindra Kumar	1,621	0.94	
NOTA	None of the above	3,823	2.22	
Majority		5,426	3.15	
Turnout		172,222	69.66	
