= Shah Mohamad Umair =

Indian politician (1903 - 1978)

Personal details
- Born: 1903
- Died: 20 February 1978 (aged 74–75)
- Party: Indian National Congress
- Spouse: Bibi Masooda
- Parent: Shah Ashfaq Hussain (father)

Shah Mohamad Umair (1903 - 20 February 1978) was an Indian politician and leader of Indian National Congress. He served as a member of Bihar Legislative Council from 1939 to 1951 and a member of Rajya Sabha (the Upper house of the Parliament of India) from 1956 to 1962.

His nephew Shah Mushtaque was Member of the Bihar Legislative Assembly from the Sikandra Assembly constituency in 1952 and 1962.

His grandson, Shah Tariq Anwar, son of Shah Mushtaque is also a politician and founder of Nationalist Congress Party. He was also Member of the Lok Sabha from Katihar Lok Sabha constituency.

== Position held ==
#	From	To	Position
1	1939	1951	Member of Bihar Legislative Council: Parliamentary Secretary & Floor Leader (1946 to 1951)
2	1956	1962	Member of parliament - Rajya Sabha
