= Balrampur, Bihar Assembly constituency =

Coordinates: 25°21′44″N 87°44′42″E

Balrampur
- Constituency No. 53 for the Bihar Legislative Assembly

Constituency details
- Country: India
- Region: East India
- State: Bihar
- Division: Purnia
- District: Katihar
- Lok Sabha constituency: Katihar
- Established: 2008
- Total electors: 348,537
- Reservation: None

Member of Legislative Assembly
- 18th Bihar Legislative Assembly
- Incumbent Sangita Devi
- Party: LJP(RV)
- Alliance: NDA
- Elected year: 2025

Balrampur Assembly constituency is an assembly constituency in Katihar district in the Indian state of Bihar.

== Overview ==
As per Delimitation of Parliamentary and Assembly constituencies Order, 2008, No 65. Balrampur Assembly constituency is composed of the following: Balrampur and Barsoi community development blocks.

Balrampur, Bihar Assembly constituency is part of No 11 Katihar (Lok Sabha constituency).

== Members of the Legislative Assembly ==
Year	Member	Party
Until 2008: Constituency did not exist
2010	Dulal Chandra Goswami	Independent
2015	Mahbub Alam	Communist Party of India (Marxist–Leninist) Liberation
2020	Mahbub Alam	Communist Party of India (Marxist–Leninist) Liberation
2025	Sangita Devi	Lok Janshakti Party (Ram Vilas)

== Election results ==
=== 2025 ===
2025 Bihar Legislative Assembly election: Balrampur
Party	Candidate	Votes	%	±%
LJP(RV)	Sangita Devi	80,459	29.04	
AIMIM	Mohammad Adil Hassan	80,070	28.90	
CPI(ML)L	Mahbub Alam	79,141	28.56	▼22.55
Independent	Mohammad Moazzam Hussain	9,195	3.32	
Independent	Barun Kumar Jha	5,372	1.94	
Independent	Mohammad Jinnah	3,446	1.24	▼2.61
JSP	Ashab Alam	2,614	0.94	
NOTA	None of the above	3,185	1.15	▼1.38
Majority		389	0.14	▼26.08
Turnout		277,074	79.5	▲18.2
LJP(RV) gain from CPI(ML)L		Swing		

=== 2020 ===
2020 Bihar Legislative Assembly election: Balrampur
Party	Candidate	Votes	%	±%
CPI(ML)L	Mahbub Alam	104,489	51.11	
VIP	Barun Kumar Jha	50,892	24.89	
LJP	Sangita Devi	8,949	4.38	
Independent	Mohammad Jinnah	7,878	3.85	
Rashtriya Jankranti Party	Azad Khan	4,747	2.32	
Independent	Jagannath Das	4,090	2.0	
NCP	Khawaja Bahauddin Ahmed	3,443	1.68	−0.29
SDPI	Munovar Husain	3,254	1.59	
Peoples Party of India (Democratic)	Md. Shamim Akhtar	3,072	1.5	
BMP	Sakir Alam	2,872	1.4	+1.05
Independent	Tanweer Shamsi	2,041	1.0	
NOTA	None of the above	5,166	2.53	+1.07
Majority		53,597	26.22	+15.86
Turnout		204,439	61.3	−4.94
CPI(ML)L hold		Swing		

=== 2015 ===
In this election Communist Party of India (Marxist–Leninist) Liberation candidate Mahbub Alam won Balrampur assembly seat defeating his nearest BJP rival Barun Kumar Jha. JD(U) candidate Dulal Chandra Goswami of JDU got third position in this seat.

2015 Bihar Legislative Assembly election: Balrampur
Party	Candidate	Votes	%	±%
CPI(ML)L	Mahbub Alam	62,513	31.70	
BJP	Barun Kumar Jha	42,094	21.34	
JD(U)	Dulal Chandra Goswami	40,114	20.34	
Independent	Niranjan Das	14,033	7.12	
SS	Hansraj Yadav	9,473	4.8	
AIMIM	Md. Adil Hasan	6,375	3.23	
NCP	Habibur Rahman	3,884	1.97	
Independent	Azad Khan	3,463	1.76	
Janta Dal Rashtravadi	Md Mushtaque Alam	2,897	1.47	
NOTA	None of the above	2,875	1.46	
Majority		20,419	10.36	
Turnout		197,216	66.24	
CPI(ML)L gain from Independent		Swing		

=== 2010 ===
In the 2010 state assembly elections, Dulal Chandra Goshwami, Independent, won the newly created Balrampur assembly seat defeating his nearest rival Mahbub Alam of CPI(ML)L.

== See also ==
- Barsoi Assembly constituency
