= Katihar district =

District in Bihar, India

Coordinates: 25°33′00″N 87°34′12″E

- District of Bihar
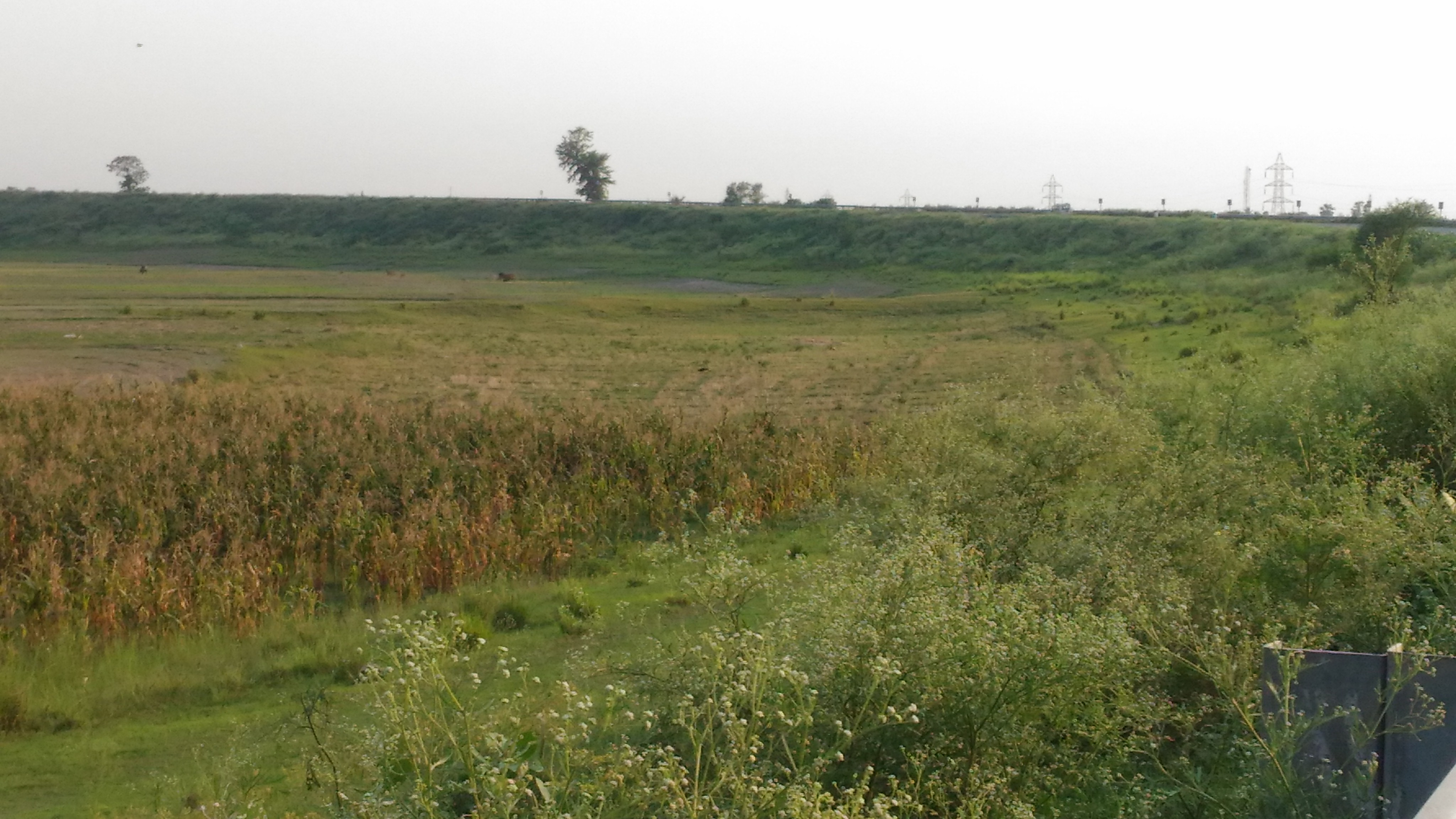
- Fields in Katihar district
- Interactive map of Katihar district
- Country: India
- State: Bihar
- Region: Mithila
- Division: Purnia
- Headquarters: Katihar
- Tehsils: 16

Government
  - Lok Sabha constituencies: Katihar
  - Vidhan Sabha constituencies: Katihar, Kadwa, Balrampur, Pranpur, Manihari, Barari Korha

Area
  - Total: 3,056 km^{2} (1,180 sq mi)

Population (2011)
  - Total: 3,071,029
  - Density: 1,005/km^{2} (2,603/sq mi)

Demographics
  - Sex ratio: 916

Language
  - Official: Hindi, Urdu
  - Regional: Maithili
- Time zone: UTC+05:30 (IST)
- Vehicle registration: BR-39
- Major highways: NH 27, NH 231 NH 12, NH 31, NH 81, NH 131A, SH 98, SH 62, SH 77, SH 65
- Website: http://katihar.bih.nic.in/

Katihar district is one of the thirty-eight districts of Bihar state in India, and Katihar city is the administrative headquarters of this district. The district is a part of Purnia Division. It is prominently known for its Katihar Junction Railway Station, which is a Category A1 station on the Barauni–Guwahati line. It has been included in the Aspirational Districts Program of the Government of India since 2018, to improve its socio-economic indicators. Katihar was the largest maize producing district of Bihar in 2022.

== Geography ==
Katihar district occupies an area of 3,057 square kilometres (1,180 sq mi), comparatively equivalent to Canada's Akimiski Island.

Rivers: Mahananda, Ganges, Koshi, Righa

Katihar district is situated in the plains of North Eastern part of Bihar State, surrounded by Purnia district (Bihar) in the north and the west, Bhagalpur district (Bihar) and Sahebganj district (Jharkhand) in the south and Malda district and Uttar Dinajpur district (Paschim Bengal) in the east.

== Politics ==
District	No.	Constituency	Name	Party	Alliance	Remarks
Katihar	63	Katihar	Tarkishore Prasad	BJP	NDA	
Katihar	64	Kadwa	Dulal Chandra Goswami	JD(U)	NDA	
Katihar	65	Balrampur	Sangita Devi	LJP(RV)	NDA	
Katihar	66	Pranpur	Nisha Singh	BJP	NDA	
Katihar	67	Manihari (ST)	Manohar Prasad Singh	INC	MGB	
Katihar	68	Barari	Bijay Singh	JD(U)	NDA	
Katihar	69	Korha (SC)	Kavita Devi	BJP	NDA	

== Economy ==
In 2006, the Ministry of Panchayati Raj named Katihar one of the country's 250 most backward districts (out of a total of 640). It is one of the 36 districts in Bihar currently receiving funds from the Backward Regions Grant Fund Programme (BRGF). It has also been included in the Aspirational Districts Program of the Government of India since 2018, to improve its socio-economic indicators.

The main source of economy in Katihar is agriculture, and most of its industries are agro-based. Rice is the main crop, while banana, jute and maize are the chief cash crops of the district. Makhana Phodi, an agro-industry where edible makhana (foxnuts) is produced from raw makhana, is a rapidly-rising industry in Katihar.

Katihar was once known as the "jute capital" of Bihar and boasted of two major jute mills, Sunbio Manufacturing Private Limited (also known as Old Jute Mill) and Rai Bahadur Hardutroy Motilal Chamria (RBHM) Jute Mill (also known as New Jute Mill).

- Old Jute Mill is spread over 35 acres of land, and is run by Govind Sharda backed Sunbio Manufacturing Private Limited. It was earlier run by the Bihar State Industrial Development Corporation (BSIDC), but was leased out in 2001. The present worker capacity (as of 2020) of the mill is around 200, with a daily production of around 10 tonnes, down from its peak of approximately 3000 and hundred tons.
- New Jute Mill is spread over 53.39 acres of land. It was started as a private mill in 1935 and first shut down in 1977. It was acquired by National Jute Manufacturers Corporation (NJMC) in 1980 and ran as a public sector undertaking till 2004, when it was closed again. It was restarted for a third time in the Public-Private Partnership (PPP) model in 2014. The mill closed its shutter in 2016, shortly after NJMC was shut following NITI Ayog recommendation in 2016, and has been shut since.

== Political history ==
The district has seen immense activity during freedom struggle. There has been renowned freedom fighters like Alhaj Azhar Ali after whose name there is a village called Ajhrail. The busiest market square, Shaheed Chowk, has been named so in the memory of martyrs of 1942 Quit India Movement. Among notable freedom fighters from Katihar are, Dhrub Kundu, his father Dr Kishori Lal Kundu, Nakshtra Malakar (known as Robinhood of the Kosi belt).

The Katihar Lok Sabha constituency has been represented by politicians like Sitaram Kesri former Teasurer and President of AICC, Tariq Anwar, Nikhil Choudhary, Mohammad Yunus Saleem. Kashmiri veteran politician Mufti Mohammad Sayeed also unsuccessfully tried his luck in 1996 Lok Sabha elections.

== Sub-divisions ==
Katihar District comprises 3 Sub-divisions:

- Katihar
- Barsoi
- Manihari

Katihar sub-division is further divided into 10 blocks: Katihar, Korha, Falka, Sameli, Barari, Kursela, Pranpur, Hasanganj, Dandkhora and Mansahi. Barsoi sub-division consists of 4 blocks: Barsoi, Kadwa, Azamnagar and Balrampur. Manihari sub-division has 2 blocks: Manihari and Amdabad.

Hasanganj being the largest block which was under Zamindari rule with acres of land under the possession of then Late Shri Jogendranarayan Roy Choudhury. The entire landmass with school, temple and market has been donated to the people from the predecessors who remain in Katihar now with little of the possession under the Paul Choudhury fame. Mansahi was also very active Zamindari estate which was at par with Kursela and Falka.

== Villages ==
- Bharri
- Dighari

Harnathpur Bhaisbandha Sonapur

== Demographics ==
Historical population
Year	Pop.	±% p.a.
1901	484,667	—
1911	520,805	+0.72%
1921	556,136	+0.66%
1931	601,533	+0.79%
1941	654,841	+0.85%
1951	694,986	+0.60%
1961	911,037	+2.74%
1971	1,136,994	+2.24%
1981	1,428,622	+2.31%
1991	1,825,380	+2.48%
2001	2,392,638	+2.74%
2011	3,071,029	+2.53%

According to the 2011 census, Katihar district has a population of 3,071,029, roughly equal to the nation of Oman or the US state of Iowa. This gives it a ranking of 117th in India (out of a total of 640). The district has a population density of 1,004 inhabitants per square kilometre (2,600/sq mi). Its population growth rate over the decade 2001–2011 was 28.23%. Katihar has a sex ratio of 916 females for every 1000 males, and a literacy rate of 53.56%. 8.92% of the population lives in urban areas. Scheduled Castes and Scheduled Tribes make up 8.57% and 5.86% of the population respectively.

=== Religion ===
Religions in Katihar district (2011)
Religion	Percent
Hinduism	54.85%
Islam	44.47%
Other or not stated	0.68%

CD block	Hinduism	Islam	Others
Falka	69.94%	29.38%	0.68%
Korha	59.16%	39.78%	1.06%
Hasanganj	62.91%	36.66%	0.43%
Kadwa	47.33%	52.27%	0.40%
Balrampur	45.67%	53.45%	0.88%
Barsoi	27.61%	72.06%	0.33%
Azamnagar	43.48%	56.21%	0.31%
Pranpur	61.37%	38.17%	0.46%
Dandkhora	85.89%	12.76%	1.35%
Katihar	70.91%	28.08%	1.01%
Mansahi	55.87%	43.79%	0.34%
Barari	52.28%	46.70%	1.02%
Sameli	91.30%	8.57%	0.13%
Kursela	92.25%	7.51%	0.24%
Manihari	62.86%	35.67%	1.47%
Amdabad	45.57%	54.13%	0.30%

Hinduism is the majority religion, although in rural areas Hindus and Muslims are in equal numbers. In the eastern part of the district Muslims are in majority.

Language of Katihar district (2011)
1. Surjapuri (25.9%)
2. 'Other' Hindi (25.5%)
3. Hindi (19.7%)
4. Bengali (12.0%)
5. Urdu (9.11%)
6. Santali (2.97%)
7. Bhojpuri (2.29%)
8. Others (2.54%)

At the time of the 2011 Census of India, 25.86% of the population in the district spoke Surjapuri, 19.73% Hindi, 12.04% Bengali, 9.11% Urdu, 2.97% Santali and 2.29% Bhojpuri as their first language. 25.46% spoke languages recorded as 'Others' under Hindi on the census. Surjapuri speakers are largely concentrated in Kadwa, Azamnagar, Barsoi and Balrampur blocks bordering West Bengal, while Bengali is nearly in majority in Amdabad block.

== Tourist places ==
Katihar is a district in the state of Bihar, India, and while it may not be as well-known as some other tourist destinations, it does have a few places of interest for visitors. Here are some tourist places in and around Katihar:

1. Kosi River Katihar is located near the Kosi River, which is known as the "Sorrow of Bihar" due to its history of flooding.

2. Manihari Ghat Manihari is a town near Katihar and is known for its historical significance as a trade center during the British colonial period. Manihari Ghat is a common spot for taking a boat ride on the Ganges River.

3. Kalki Mandir: This is a well-known temple dedicated to Goddess Kali. It's a place of religious importance and is often visited by locals and tourists alike.

4. Kastaharni Ghat: This ghat on the Ganges River is believed to have the power to relieve people of their sufferings and sins. It's a place of religious importance and tranquility.

5. Durga Mandir: Katihar is known for its Durga Puja celebration. During the Puja, the whole of Katihar is decorated as best can be seen different types of pandals at each other step. Each year, pandals are created using different types of materials and with different themes.

6. Recently Gogabeel Jheel added to list of ramsar sites and is also 1st community reserve of Bihar

=== Languages ===
Languages in Katihar district (2011)
1. Surjapuri (25.9%)
2. 'Other' Hindi (25.5%)
3. Hindi (19.7%)
4. Bengali (12.0%)
5. Urdu (9.11%)
6. Santali (2.97%)
7. Bhojpuri (2.29%)
8. Others (2.54%)

At the time of the 2011 Census of India, 25.86% of the population in the district spoke Surjapuri, 19.73% Hindi, 12.04% Bengali, 9.11% Urdu, 2.97% Santali and 2.29% Bhojpuri as their first language. 25.46% spoke languages recorded as 'Others' under Hindi on the census. Surjapuri speakers are largely concentrated in Kadwa, Azamnagar, Barsoi and Balrampur blocks bordering West Bengal, while Bengali is nearly in majority in Amdabad block.
