= Kalki Mandir =

Hindu temple in Jaipur Kalki Tantram by Syam

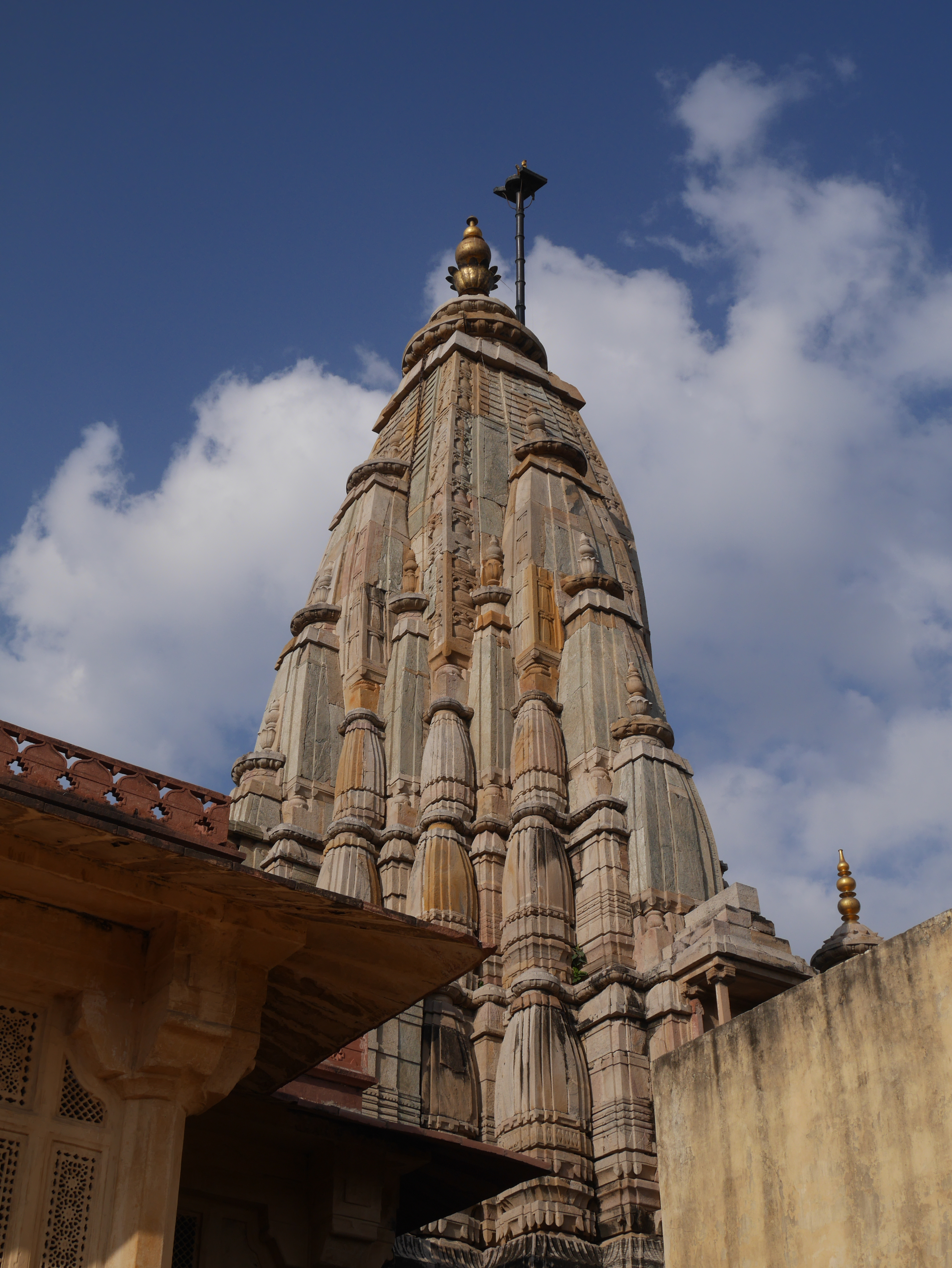
- Kalki Temple Shikhara

- Location within Jaipur Location within Rajasthan Location within India

Religion
- Affiliation: Hinduism
- District: Jaipur
- Deity: Kalki

Location
- State: Rajasthan
- Country: India
- Coordinates: 26.9262837°N 75.8268671°E

Kalki Mandir (Sanskrit: कल्कि मंदिर) is a Hindu temple in Jaipur, Rajasthan, India, which was built by Jai Singh II in the 18th century. The temple is located in Sireh Deori Bazar opposite the palace gate. In the temple yard is a statue of a horse made of white marble. As main deities the temple contains Vigrah (idol) of Kalki and Lakshmi (wife of Narayana). Kalki is the prophesied tenth and final incarnation of the Hindu god Vishnu. Lakshmi is one of the principal goddesses in Hinduism, revered as the goddess of wealth, fortune, prosperity, beauty, fertility, royal power, and abundance.
