= Sanjay Paswan =

Indian politician

Dr. Sanjay Paswan

Member of the Bihar Legislative Council
- In office 6 May 2018 – March 2024
- Constituency: elected by Legislative Assembly members

Minister of state in the Ministry of Human Resource Development
- In office 24 May 2003 – 22 May 2004
- Minister: Murli Manohar Joshi
- Preceded by: Ashok Kumar Pradhan

Minister of state in the Ministry of Social Justice and Empowerment
- In office 29 January 2003 – 24 May 2003
- Minister: Satyanarayan Jatiya

Minister of state in the Ministry of Communications
- In office 1 July 2002 – 29 January 2003
- Minister: Pramod Mahajan
- Preceded by: tapan Sikdar

Member of Parliament, Lok Sabha
- In office 1999–2004
- Preceded by: Malti Devi
- Succeeded by: Virchandra Paswan
- Constituency: Nawada

Personal details
- Born: 2 May 1962 (age 64) Navtolia, Darbhanga district, Bihar
- Party: Bharatiya Janata Party
- Spouse: Dr. Pramanshi Jaideva (m. 1986)
- Children: 2
- Education: Patna University, Ranchi University
- Occupation: Politician, Teacher, Educationist, Trade Unionist

Dr. Sanjay Mahavir Ram Paswan (born 2 May 1962) is an Indian BJP politician. He was minister of state of human resource development in Vajpayee's government.

He was elected to 13th Lok Sabha from Nawada constituency of Bihar. He is former National President, BJP SC Morcha and presently national executive member of Bharatiya Janata Party.

He was elected as MLC in Bihar on 6 May 2018 representing BJP. Paswan unsuccessfully contested 2005 Assembly Election on RJD symbol. Paswan spent his time serving several political parties including RJD, Congress and Lok Janshakti Party and finally returned to the BJP in 2008.

He has penned many books and contributed to many, his best book being Encyclopedia of Dalits.

His brother Ajay Paswan was mayor in Darbhanga Municipal Corporation from 2007 to 2011.
