= Sangita Devi =

Indian politician

Sangita Devi (born 1984) is an Indian politician from Bihar. She is a member of the Bihar Legislative Assembly from Balarampur Assembly constituency in Katihar district. She won the 2025 Bihar Legislative Assembly election representing the Lok Janshakti Party (Ram Vilas). She polled 80,459 votes, 389 more than Mohammad Adil Hasan of the All India Majlis-e-Ittehadul Muslimeen who garnered 80,070 votes. Sitting MLA Mahbub Alam polled 79,141 votes to finish third.

She passed Class 12 and is into agriculture and business.
