= Kavita Devi (politician) =

Indian politician

Member of Bihar Legislative Assembly
- Incumbent
- Assumed office 2020
- Preceded by: Poonam Paswan
- Constituency: Korha

Personal details
- Born: 5 March 1975 (age 51)
- Party: Bharatiya Janata Party
- Occupation: Politician

Kavita Devi is an Indian politician from Bihar and a Member of the Bihar Legislative Assembly. Devi won the Korha on the Bharatiya Janata Party ticket in the 2020 Bihar Legislative Assembly election.
