= Bhola Singh =

Indian politician

Member of Parliament, Lok Sabha
- In office 16 May 2014 – 19 October 2018
- Preceded by: Monazir Hassan
- Succeeded by: Giriraj Singh
- Constituency: Begusarai
- In office 2009–2014
- Preceded by: Virchandra Paswan
- Succeeded by: Giriraj Singh
- Constituency: Nawada

Minister of Urban development and Housing, Government of Bihar
- In office 2008–2009
- Chief Minister: Nitish Kumar

Personal details
- Born: 3 January 1939 Begusarai, Bihar, British India
- Died: 19 October 2018 (aged 79) New Delhi, India
- Party: Bharatiya Janata Party
- Spouse: Smt. Savitri Devi
- Children: 3 Sons & 2 Daughters
- Education: Patna University
- As of 12 December, 2016

Bhola Singh (3 January 1939 – 19 October 2018) was an Indian politician. He was a member of the Indian Parliament and represented Begusarai (Lok Sabha constituency) which he won on a ticket from the BJP. Before joining the BJP he had been part of almost every political party in Bihar including the Communist Party, the Indian National Congress, and the Rashtriya Janata Dal. Before getting elected to the Indian Parliament he was the Urban Development Minister of Bihar. He was the Deputy Speaker of the Bihar Legislative Assembly from 2000 to 2005. He was a professor in History before getting elected from Begusarai in 1967 as an independent candidate.

Starting his political career in the late 1960s, he has been elected as member of the state legislative assembly from the Begusarai assembly seat eight times since 1967. His only electoral venture outside the district was in 2009 when he successfully contested the general election from Nawada as a BJP nominee.

== Political career ==
Bhola Singh's long political journey spanning almost five decades began as a left-supported Independent MLA in 1967 before being formally elected as CPI MLA in 1972. He, however, later joined Congress in 1977 owing to differences with leaders in the CPI and even pulled off a spectacular victory as a Congress nominee from the Begusarai seat in 1977, when only 56 Congress party nominees could be elected in the 324-seat assembly. Singh has also served as the state home minister in the Chandra Shekhar Singh cabinet. He also held the position of the education minister from 1988-89 under Congress government in the state. However, his date with Congress finally ended after losing two successive assembly elections in 1990 and 1995 during the period when RJD supremo Lalu Prasad was at his prime. He also joined Lalu's party, the then Janata Dal, and was in it for a brief period. As his political fortune plunged, Singh joined the BJP and his political career was revived when he again managed to win the Begusarai assembly seat in 2000 and retain it in 2005 also. During the period he remained deputy speaker of the state assembly from 2003 to 2005. In 2008, he was made state urban development minister in the NDA government. He died on 19 October 2018 after a long illness.

== See also ==
- List of politicians from Bihar
- Kapildev Singh
- C.P. Thakur
- Sushil Kumar Modi

Lok Sabha
Preceded by Monazir Hassan	Member of Parliament for Begusarai; 2014 – 2018	Succeeded by Giriraj Singh
