= Kadwa Assembly constituency =

Constituency of the Bihar legislative assembly in India

Coordinates: 25°37′42″N 87°44′04″E

Kadwa
- Constituency No. 64 for the Bihar Legislative Assembly

Constituency details
- Country: India
- Region: East India
- State: Bihar
- District: Katihar
- Lok Sabha constituency: Katihar
- Established: 1951
- Total electors: 280,637
- Reservation: None

Member of Legislative Assembly
- 18th Bihar Legislative Assembly
- Incumbent Dulal Chandra Goswami
- Party: JD(U)
- Alliance: NDA
- Elected year: 2025
- Preceded by: Shakeel Ahmad Khan, INC

Kadwa Assembly constituency is an assembly constituency in Katihar district in the Indian state of Bihar.

== Overview ==
As per Delimitation of Parliamentary and Assembly constituencies Order, 2008, No 64. Kadwa Assembly constituency is composed of the following: Kadwa and Dandkhora community development blocks.

Kadwa Assembly constituency is part of No 11 Katihar (Lok Sabha constituency).

== Members of the Legislative Assembly ==
Year	Name	Party
1952	Jiwats Himansu Sharma	Indian National Congress
1957	Mohiuddin Mokhtar	Indian National Congress
1962	Kamal Nath Jha	Indian National Congress
1977	Khwaja Shahid Hussain	Independent politician
1980	Mangan Insan	Independent politician
1985	Usman Ghani	Indian National Congress
1990	Abdul Jalil	Independent politician
1995	Bhola Ray	Bharatiya Janata Party
2000	Himraj Singh	Independent politician
2005	Abdul Jalil	Nationalist Congress Party
2005	Abdul Jalil	Nationalist Congress Party
2010	Bhola Ray	Bharatiya Janata Party
2015	Shakeel Ahmad Khan	Indian National Congress
2020	Shakeel Ahmad Khan	Indian National Congress
2025	Dulal Chandra Goswami	Janata Dal (United)

== Election results ==
=== 2025 ===
Bihar Legislative Assembly Election, 2025: Kadwa
Party	Candidate	Votes	%	±%
JD(U)	Dulal Chandra Goswami	99,274	46.57	+27.84
INC	Shakeel Ahmad Khan	80,906	37.96	−4.04
AIMIM	Md Shakir Reza	11,557	5.42	
Independent	Himraj Singh	5,615	2.63	−0.41
Independent	Sadiq Hussain	2,967	1.39	
NOTA	None of the above	3,818	1.79	+0.96
Majority		18,368	8.61	−10.49
Turnout		213,155	75.95	+15.64
JD(U) gain from INC		Swing		

=== 2020 ===
2020 Bihar Legislative Assembly election: Kadwa
Party	Candidate	Votes	%	±%
INC	Shakeel Ahmad Khan	71,267	42.0	+6.55
LJP	Chandra Bhushan Thakur	38,865	22.9	
JD(U)	Suraj Prasad Rai	31,779	18.73	
Independent	Himraj Singh	5,164	3.04	
Independent	Minu Kumari	3,713	2.19	
Independent	Ranjeet Prasad Das	2,284	1.35	
RLSP	Uma Kant Anand	1,900	1.12	
Independent	Manoranjan Prasad Das	1,721	1.01	
Independent	Sajan Kumar	1,694	1.0	
NCP	Nizam	1,638	0.97	−13.97
Independent	Md Anwar Alam	1,601	0.94	
NOTA	None of the above	1,405	0.83	−0.39
Majority		32,402	19.1	+15.44
Turnout		169,680	60.31	−4.47
INC hold		Swing		

=== 2015 ===
2015 Bihar Legislative Assembly election: Kadwa
Party	Candidate	Votes	%	±%
INC	Shakeel Ahmad Khan	56,141	35.45	
BJP	Chander Bhushan Thakur	50,342	31.79	
NCP	Himraj Singh	23,665	14.94	
Independent	Ashok Kumar Mehta	8,670	5.47	
Independent	Firoz Alam	2,672	1.69	
Sarvajan Kalyan Loktantrik Party	Dinesh Insan	2,439	1.54	
Independent	Ram Prasad Mahli	2,056	1.3	
Independent	Ashish Kumar Singh	1,700	1.07	
NOTA	None of the above	1,925	1.22	
Majority		5,799	3.66	
Turnout		158,361	64.78	

=== 2010 ===
In the 2010 state assembly elections, Bhola Ray of BJP won the Kadwa assembly seat defeating his nearest rival Himraj Singh of NCP. Contests in most years were multi cornered but only winners and runners up are being mentioned. Abdul Jalil of NCP defeated Himraj Singh representing BJP in October 2005 and Bhola Ray of BJP in February 2005. Himraj Singh, Independent, defeated Abdul Jalil representing RJD in 2000. Bhola Ray of BJP defeated Gulam Asraf of JD in 1995. Abdul Jalil, Independent, defeated Bhola Ray of BJP in 1990. Usman Ghani of Congress defeated Khaja Shahid, Independent, in 1985. Mangan Insan, Independent, defeated Usman Ghani of Congress in 1980. Khaja Shahid Hussain, Independent, defeated Mangan Insan, Independent, in 1977.
