= Virchandra Paswan =

Indian politician

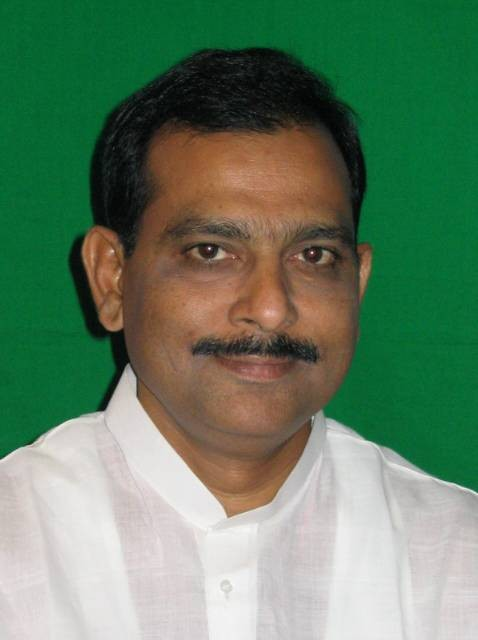

MP
- In office 2004–2009
- Preceded by: Sanjay Paswan
- Succeeded by: Bhola Singh
- Constituency: Nawada

Personal details
- Born: 1 July 1964 (age 62) Vaishali, Bihar
- Party: BJP
- Spouse: Pramila Paswan
- Children: 2 sons and 1 daughter
- As of 26 September, 2006

Virchandra Paswan (born 1 July 1964) is a member of the 14th Lok Sabha of India between 2004 and 2009. He represented the Nawada constituency of Bihar as a member of the Rashtriya Janata Dal (RJD) political party. On 13 September 2013, he joined Bhartiya Janata Party (BJP).

He didn't contest the 15th Lok Sabha in 2009.
