= Rabindra Kumar Rana =

Indian politician (1947–2022)

MP
- Constituency: Khagaria

Personal details
- Born: 23 January 1947 Narayanpur, Bhagalpur, Bihar, British Raj
- Died: 23 March 2022 (aged 75) Delhi, India
- Party: RJD
- Spouse: Nayana Rana
- Children: 4 (3 sons and 1 daughter)
- As of 26 September, 2006

Rabindra Kumar Rana (23 January 1947 – 23 March 2022) was a member of the 14th Lok Sabha of India. He represented the Khagaria constituency of Bihar and was a member of the Rashtriya Janata Dal (RJD) political party. His name became famous in the Fodder Scam.
