= Mohammad Ali Ashraf Fatmi =

Indian politician (born 1956)

Md. Ali Ashraf Fatmi Father Name: Md. Iliyas Ashraf Bahadurpur (Bihar) constituency, at Serial no 305 in Part no 242 Alma Matter:Graduate B.Sc. Engineering (Civil) from Aligarh in 1977, P.G. Diploma from Aligarh in 1979

MP 14th Lok Sabha
- Constituency: Darbhanga

Personal details
- Born: 1 January 1956 (age 70) Darbhanga, Bihar, India

Md. Ali Ashraf Fatmi (born 1 January 1956) was a member of the 14th Lok Sabha of India. He represented the Darbhanga constituency of Bihar.
