= Monazir Hassan =

Indian politician

Dr. Monazir Hassan

Member of Parliament Lok Sabha
- In office 16 May 2009 – 16 May 2014
- Preceded by: Rajiv Ranjan Singh
- Succeeded by: Bhola Singh
- Constituency: Begusarai

Member of Bihar Legislative Assembly
- In office 1995–2009
- Constituency: Munger, Bihar

Minister of Building Construction Department, Government of Bihar
- In office 2005–2008

Minister of State Youth and Sports, Government of Bihar
- In office 2000–2004

Personal details
- Born: 5 February 1957 (age 69)
- Party: Rashtriya Lok Morcha
- Other political affiliations: Rashtriya Janata Dal (1995-2004) Janata Dal (United) (2004-2023)

Monazir Hassan (born 5 February 1957) is an Indian politician. He was the member of the Indian Parliament, in 15th Lok Sabha (2009 to 2014) and represented Begusarai (Lok Sabha constituency). He joined the Jan Suraaj Party on 22 July 2024.

A trusted lieutenant of Nitish Kumar, Hassan had served as cabinet minister under Nitish before entering Lok Sabha. Hassan was part of Lalu Prasad Yadav's RJD and served as minister under him too. After political disagreements with the chief minister Mr. Nitish Kumar, Mr. Hassan resigned from all positions of Janata Dal (United) on 28 May 2023. Mr. Hassan joined Rashtriya Lok Janata Dal on 18 September 2023 at the residence of Upendra Kushwaha at Patna with his supporters.

== Early life and education ==
Dr. Monazir Hassan was born 5 February 1957 in Munger district, Munger, Bihar, India.

Dr. Hassan had his early education in Munger and has attended Tilka Manjhi Bhagalpur University.

== Political career ==
- 1995 to 2009 Member Bihar Legislative Assembly (Four Terms) from Munger
- 1997 to 2004 State President. Rashtriya Janta Dal (Youth)
- 2000 to 2004 Minister of State Youth and Sports, Govt. of Bihar.
- 2005 to 2008 Cabinet Minister Building Construction, Govt. of Bihar.
- 2009 to 2014 Member of Parliament from Begusarai Loksabha.
