= Dulal Chandra Goswami =

Member of the 17th Lok Sabha

Dulal Ji Chandra Goswami
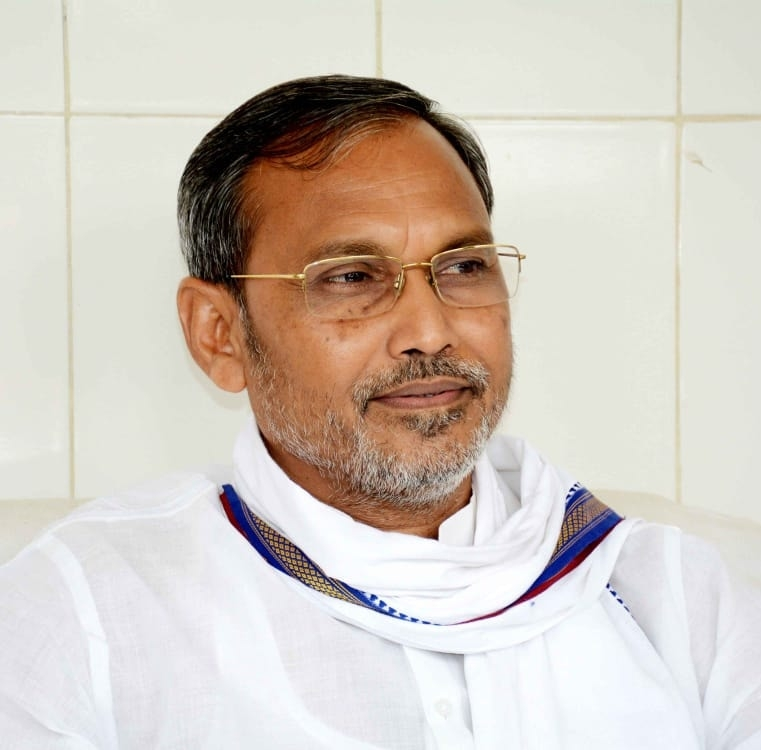
- Dulal Chandra Goswami, Member Of Parliament From Katihar at 17th Lok Sabha

Member of Parliament, Lok Sabha
- In office 23 May 2019 – 04 June 2024
- Preceded by: Tariq Anwar
- Succeeded by: Tariq Anwar
- Constituency: Katihar

Minister of Transport Government of Bihar
- In office 22 February 2015 – 20 November 2015
- Preceded by: Brishin Patel
- Succeeded by: Chandrika Roy

Minister of Labour Resources Government of Bihar
- In office 20 May 2014 – 22 February 2015

Member of Bihar Legislative Assembly
- In office 2010–2015
- Preceded by: constituency established
- Succeeded by: Mahbub Alam
- Constituency: Balrampur

Personal details
- Born: 8 October 1967 (age 58) Karimganj, Katihar district, Bihar
- Party: Janata Dal (United)
- Spouse: Smt. Nutan Priya

Dulal Chandra Goswami is an Indian politician. Currently he is the member of 18th Bihar Legislative Assembly 2025 from Kadwa Assembly constituency.

He was elected to the Lok Sabha, lower house of the Parliament of India from Katihar in the 2019 Indian general election as member of the Janata Dal (United).

== See also ==
- List of members of the 17th Lok Sabha
