= Manohar Prasad Singh =

Indian politician

Member of Bihar Legislative Assembly
- Incumbent
- Assumed office 2010
- Preceded by: Vishwanath Singh
- Constituency: Manihari

Personal details
- Party: Indian National Congress (2015-present)
- Other political affiliations: Janata Dal (United) (-2015)
- Profession: Politician

Manohar Prasad Singh is an Indian politician from Bihar. He is the Indian National Congress MLA of Manihari Assembly constituency. He is a former police officer and formerly was part of the Janata Dal (United), on whose ticket he was elected in 2010. He is from the Kharwar community.
