= Nikhil Kumar Choudhary =

Indian politician

Minister of State for Agro & Rural Industries
- In office 1 July 2002 – 29 January 2003
- Prime Minister: Atal Bihari Vajpayee
- Minister: Kariya Munda

Member of Parliament, Lok Sabha
- In office 10 October 1999 – 26 May 2014
- Preceded by: Tariq Anwar
- Succeeded by: Tariq Anwar
- Constituency: Katihar

Personal details
- Born: 6 December 1945 (age 80) Katihar, Bihar, India
- Party: BJP
- Spouse: Usha Devi (m. 1968)
- Children: 3 sons and 1 daughter
- Education: B.Sc
- Alma mater: T.N.B. College, Bhagalpur

Nikhil Kumar Choudhary (born 6 December 1949) is an Indian politician, who was a member of the 13th, 14th and 15th Lok Sabha representing the Katihar constituency of Bihar, and is a member of the Bharatiya Janata Party. He was a Minister of State in the National Democratic Alliance government.
