= Barsoi =

Barsoi and Salmari
- Town
- Nickname: City of villages
- Location in Bihar, India
- Coordinates: 25°39′05″N 87°55′21″E
- Country: India
- State: Bihar
- Region: Seemanchal
- District: Katihar
- Elevation: 67 m (220 ft)

Population (2011)
  - Total: 344,133

Languages
  - Official: Hindi, Urdu
  - Regional: Surjapuri, Maithili, Hindi, Bengali
- Time zone: UTC+5:30 (IST)
- PIN: 855102
- Telephone code: 06451
- ISO 3166 code: IN-BR
- Lok Sabha constituency: Katihar
- Vidhan Sabha constituency: Balrampur

Barsoi and Salmari is a town and nagar panchayat in the Katihar district of Bihar, India. It serves as the headquarters of the Barsoi subdivision and of the Barsoi community development block, which had a population of about 344,000 as of the 2011 Census. The town lies in the Seemanchal region and is best known for Barsoi Junction, a busy junction station of the Northeast Frontier Railway zone that links Bihar with West Bengal, Assam and the northeastern states.

At the early 1869 it was discovered and founded by an native named pavithra and later it was named barasoii and then barsoi

Barsoi has a mixed rural and semi-urban character. Agriculture, local trade, small businesses and railway employment together make up the main sources of livelihood. The town also works as a service and supply centre for many surrounding villages.

== History ==
The growth of Barsoi is closely tied to the expansion of railways in eastern India. During the late nineteenth and early twentieth centuries, new rail links connecting eastern Bengal with North Bihar and the Northeast were laid through the area, and Barsoi developed as a junction on these routes. The railway brought traders, railway staff and support services, and the original small market gradually turned into a regional commercial centre.

== Geography ==
Barsoi is located in the northern part of Katihar district within the Seemanchal belt. The area forms part of the alluvial plains of the Ganges basin, with fertile soil suitable for the cultivation of paddy, wheat, maize, jute and vegetables. The climate is humid subtropical, characterised by hot summers, a wet monsoon season and cool winters.

== Economy ==
The local economy is mainly based on:

- Agriculture – cultivation of paddy, wheat, maize, jute, pulses and vegetables in the surrounding countryside;
- Railway employment – jobs related to Barsoi Junction and its associated facilities;
- Trade and services – grocery shops, textile stores, hardware and electronic goods, repair services and wholesale grain and vegetable markets;
- Transport and logistics – movement of goods and passengers by rail and road to Katihar, Purnia, Siliguri and other towns.

Because of its location and transport links, Barsoi acts as a distribution node for essential commodities for nearby rural areas.

== Transportation ==
=== Rail ===
Barsoi Junction is a major railway junction on the Northeast Frontier Railway. It lies on the Howrah–New Jalpaiguri main line and forms the junction point for routes towards Katihar, Siliguri, Guwahati and the Barsoi–Radhikapur branch line leading towards the India–Bangladesh border. A large number of express and passenger trains halt at the station, making it an important gateway for the Seemanchal region.

=== Road ===
Barsoi is linked by road to Katihar, Azamnagar, Kadwa, Balrampur and Purnia. Local transport mainly consists of auto-rickshaws, e-rickshaws, shared jeeps and buses connecting the town with nearby villages and markets.

== Culture ==
Barsoi has a culturally diverse population. Hindi and Urdu are the official languages, while Surjapuri and Maithili are widely spoken as regional languages. The major religious communities celebrate festivals such as Eid, Chhath Puja, Durga Puja, Diwali and Holi. Weekly markets (haats), roadside food stalls and traditional dishes like litti-chokha, sweets and non-vegetarian preparations contribute to the local cultural life.

== Education ==
The town has several government and private schools, Urdu-medium institutions and madrasas. In recent years, coaching centres preparing students for school examinations and competitive tests have increased in number. Students from neighbouring villages often travel to Barsoi for schooling, while higher education is usually pursued in larger nearby cities such as Katihar, Purnia and Siliguri.

== Notable features ==
- Barsoi serves as the headquarters of the Barsoi subdivision and community development block.
- Barsoi Junction is one of the busier junction stations of the Northeast Frontier Railway zone and a key transit point for trains between eastern India and the Northeast.
- The town functions as a commercial and supply hub for numerous villages in the Seemanchal region.

== See also ==
- Barsoi Junction railway station
- Barsoi (Vidhan Sabha constituency)

== See also ==
- Barsoi (Vidhan Sabha constituency)
