= Katihar Lok Sabha constituency =

Lok Sabha constituency in Bihar

Coordinates: 25.5°N 87.6°E

Katihar
- Lok Sabha constituency

Constituency details
- Country: India
- Region: East India
- State: Bihar
- Assembly constituencies: Katihar; Kadwa; Balrampur; Pranpur; Manihari; Barari
- Established: 1957
- Reservation: None

Member of Parliament
- 18th Lok Sabha
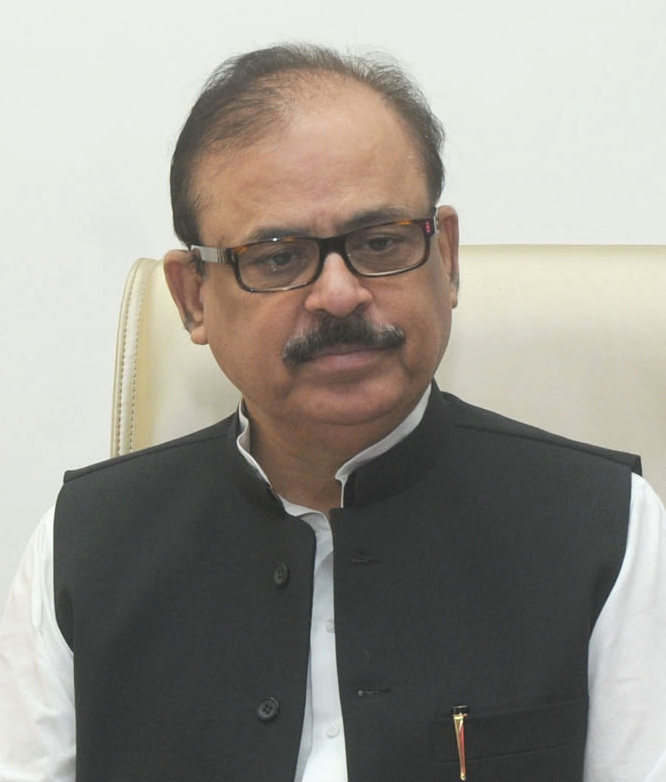
- Incumbent Tariq Anwar
- Party: INC
- Alliance: I.N.D.I.A.
- Elected year: 2024
- Preceded by: Dulal Chandra Goswami

Katihar is one of the 40 Lok Sabha (parliamentary) constituencies in Bihar state in eastern India.

== Vidhan Sabha segments ==
Presently, Katihar Lok Sabha constituency comprises the following six Vidhan Sabha (legislative assembly) segments:

#	Name	District	Member	Party	2024 lead
63	Katihar	Katihar	Tarkishore Prasad	BJP	JD(U)
64	Kadwa	Katihar	Dulal Chandra Goswami	JD(U)	JD(U)
65	Balrampur	Katihar	Sangita Devi	LJP(RV)	INC
66	Pranpur	Katihar	Nisha Singh	BJP	INC
67	Manihari (ST)	Katihar	Manohar Prasad Singh	INC	INC
68	Barari	Katihar	Bijay Singh	JD(U)	JD(U)

== Members of Lok Sabha ==
The following is the list of the Members of Parliament elected from this Lok Sabha constituency:

Year	Name	Party
1957	Avadhesh Kumar Singh	Indian National Congress
1958^	Bhola Nath Biswas	Indian National Congress
1962	Priya Gupta	Praja Socialist Party
1967	Sitaram Kesri	Indian National Congress
1971	Gyaneshwar Prasad Yadav	Bharatiya Jana Sangh
1977	Yuvraj	Janata Party
1980	Tariq Anwar	Indian National Congress (I)
1984	Tariq Anwar	Indian National Congress
1989	Yuvraj	Janata Dal
1991	Yunus Saleem	Janata Dal
1996	Tariq Anwar	Indian National Congress
1998	Tariq Anwar	Indian National Congress
1999	Nikhil Kumar Choudhary	Bharatiya Janata Party
2004	Nikhil Kumar Choudhary	Bharatiya Janata Party
2009	Nikhil Kumar Choudhary	Bharatiya Janata Party
2014	Tariq Anwar	Nationalist Congress Party
2019	Dulal Chandra Goswami	Janata Dal (United)
2024	Tariq Anwar	Indian National Congress

^ by-poll

== Election results ==
Vote share of Winning candidates
2024	48.41%
2019	50.05%
2014	44.11%
2009	37.23%
2004	41.01%
1999	43.92%
1998	47.87%
1996	42.11%
1991	35.05%
1989	54.71%
1984	50.06%
1980	44.21%
1977	69.41%
1971	35.05%
1967	22.54%
1962	45.44%
1958 (by-poll)	54.52%
1957	51.88%

=== General Elections 2029 ===
2029 Indian general election: Katihar
Party	Candidate	Votes	%	±%
INC	Tariq Anwar			
BJP	Nikhil Kumar Choudhary			
Independent				
NOTA	None of the above			
Margin of victory				
Turnout				
		Swing		

=== 2024 ===
2024 Indian general election: Katihar
Party	Candidate	Votes	%	±%
INC	Tariq Anwar	567,092	48.41	▲3.48
JD(U)	Dulal Chandra Goswami	517,229	44.15	▼5.90
BSP	Gopal Kumar Mahto	14,498	1.24	▲0.88
IND	2 Independent Candidates	23,188	1.98	
OTH	4 Other Party Candidates	26,600	2.27	
NOTA	None of the Above	22,939	1.96	▲0.12
Majority		49,863	4.26	▼0.86
Turnout				
Swing to INC from JD(U)		Swing		

=== 2019 ===
2019 Indian general election: Katihar
Party	Candidate	Votes	%	±%
JD(U)	Dulal Chandra Goswami	559,423	50.05	▲39.75
INC	Tariq Anwar	502,220	44.93	
NCP	Muhammad Shakur	9,248	0.83	▼43.28
BSP	Shivnandan Mandal	4,014	0.36	
IND	2 Independent Candidates	14,366	1.29	
OTH	3 Other Party Candidates	7,879	0.70	
NOTA	None of the above	20,584	1.84	▲1.50
Majority		57,203	5.12	▼6.62
Turnout				
Swing to JD(U) from NCP		Swing		

=== 2014 ===
2014 Indian general election: Katihar
Party	Candidate	Votes	%	±%
NCP	Tariq Anwar	431,292	44.11	▲8.81
BJP	Nikhil Kumar Choudhary	316,552	32.37	▼4.86
JD(U)	Dr. Ram Prakash Mahto	100,765	10.30	
JMM	Baleshwar Marandi	33,593	3.44	
CPI(ML)L	Mahbub Alam	9,461	0.97	▼3.45
AITC	Mahammad Hamid Mobarak	8,392	0.86	
IND	7 Independent Candidates	51,362	5.25	
OTH	8 Other Party Candidates	23,126	2.37	
NOTA	None of the above	3,287	0.34	
Majority		114,740	11.74	▲9.81
Turnout				
Swing to NCP from BJP		Swing		

=== 2009 ===
2009 Indian general election: Katihar
Party	Candidate	Votes	%	±%
BJP	Nikhil Kumar Choudhary	269,834	37.23	▼3.78
NCP	Tariq Anwar	255,819	35.30	▼5.35
LJP	Ahmad Ashfaque Karim	45,773	6.32	
IND	Himraj Singh	42,026	5.80	
CPI(ML)L	Mahboob Alam	32,035	4.42	▲1.64
IND	Mohammad Hamid Mubarak	23,894	3.30	
BSP	Madan Mohan Nishad	15,760	2.17	▲0.09
IND	6 Independent Candidates	27,191	3.75	
OTH	3 Other Party Candidates	12,470	1.72	
Majority		14,015	1.93	▲1.57
Turnout				
BJP hold		Swing		

=== 2004 ===
2004 Indian general election: Katihar
Party	Candidate	Votes	%	±%
BJP	Nikhil Kumar Choudhary	288,922	41.01	▼2.91
NCP	Tariq Anwar	286,357	40.65	▲18.13
SP	Mubarak Hussain	37,584	5.34	
JDP	Radha Uraon	23,602	3.35	
CPI(ML)L	Quddus Ali	19,569	2.78	
BSP	Shiv Nandan Mandal	14,663	2.08	▲1.15
SS	Prem Kumar	3,540	0.50	
IND	7 Independent Candidates	30,212	4.29	
Majority		2,565	0.36	▼21.04
Turnout				
BJP hold		Swing		

=== 1999 ===
1999 Indian general election: Katihar
Party	Candidate	Votes	%	±%
BJP	Nikhil Kumar Choudhary	280,911	43.92	▼1.05
NCP	Tariq Anwar	144,059	22.52	
INC	Mubarak Hussain	141,575	22.14	▼25.73
IND	Ram Prakash Mahto	48,900	7.65	
BSP	Madan Mohan Singh Nishad	5,960	0.93	
IND	9 Independent Candidates	18,153	2.84	
Majority		136,852	21.40	▲18.50
Turnout		647,219	62.26	
Swing to BJP from INC		Swing		

=== 1998 ===
1998 Indian general election: Katihar
Party	Candidate	Votes	%	±%
INC	Tariq Anwar	337,360	47.87	▲5.76
BJP	Nikhil Kumar Choudhary	316,923	44.97	▲16.74
JD	Sakil Ahamad Kha	25,144	3.57	▼20.72
IND	8 Independent Candidates	11,651	1.65	
OTH	4 Other Party Candidates	13,731	1.94	
Majority		20,437	2.90	▼10.98
Turnout				
INC hold		Swing		

=== 1996 ===
1996 Indian general election: Katihar
Party	Candidate	Votes	%	±%
INC	Tariq Anwar	267,927	42.11	▲11.81
BJP	Nikhil Kumar Choudhary	179,641	28.23	▲0.12
JD	Mufti Mohd Sayeed	154,573	24.29	▼10.76
CPI(M)	Mahboob Alam	9,934	1.56	
SS	Yugal Kishor Verma	3,071	0.48	
BSP	Sadhan Kumar Das	478	0.08	
AIIC(T)	Syed Sohail Ahmad Nomani	376	0.06	
IND	17 Independent Candidates	20,290	3.19	
Majority		88,286	13.88	▲9.13
Turnout		646,733	64.96	▲6.74
Swing to INC from JD		Swing		

=== 1991 ===
1991 Indian general election: Katihar
Party	Candidate	Votes	%	±%
JD	Md. Yunus Salim	174,430	35.05	▼19.66
INC	Tariq Anwar	150,808	30.30	▼7.75
BJP	Nikhil Kumar Chaudhary	139,894	28.11	
IND	23 Independent Candidates	21,423	4.29	
OTH	3 Other Party Candidates	11,174	2.25	
Majority		23,622	4.75	▼11.91
Turnout		503,685	58.22	▼15.55
JD hold		Swing		

=== 1989 ===
1989 Indian general election: Katihar
Party	Candidate	Votes	%	±%
JD	Yuvaraj	338,782	54.71	
INC	Tariq Anwar	235,604	38.05	▼12.01
IND	Parameshwar Pd. Yadav	26,785	4.33	
IND	14 Independent Candidates	18,057	2.91	
Majority		103,178	16.66	▲6.66
Turnout		630,832	73.77	▲3.78
Swing to JD from INC		Swing		

=== 1984 ===
1984 Indian general election: Katihar
Party	Candidate	Votes	%	±%
INC	Tariq Anwar	229,883	50.06	▲5.85
JP	Juvraj	183,940	40.06	▲8.07
IND	Uma Shankar Choudhary	25,559	5.57	
BJP	Indra Deo Gupta	8,763	1.91	
IND	9 Independent Candidates	11,029	2.40	
Majority		45,943	10.00	▼2.22
Turnout		470,487	69.99	▲17.90
Swing to INC from INC(I)		Swing		

=== 1980 ===
1980 Indian general election: Katihar
Party	Candidate	Votes	%	±%
INC(I)	Tariq Anwar	138,099	44.21	▲16.69
JP	Yuvraj	99,943	31.99	▼37.42
JP(S)	Sayed Zabir Hussain	29,351	9.40	
CPI(M)	Subodh Rai	18,170	5.82	
INC(U)	Satya Narain Biswas	11,218	3.59	
IND	Suryadeo Singh	8,970	2.87	
IND	Comrade Kumar	3,796	1.22	
IND	Mangan Insan	2,437	0.78	
IND	Ibrahim	421	0.13	
Majority		38,156	12.22	▼29.67
Turnout		318,884	52.09	▼8.08
Swing to INC(I) from JP		Swing		

=== 1977 ===
1977 Indian general election: Katihar
Party	Candidate	Votes	%	±%
JP	Yuvraj	215,074	69.41	
INC	Tariq Anwar	85,285	27.52	▼2.85
IND	Kamrul Ahsan	7,901	2.55	
IND	Abdur Satar	1,590	0.51	
Majority		129,789	41.89	▲37.21
Turnout		317,800	60.17	▲9.37
Swing to JP from ABJS		Swing		

=== 1971 ===
1971 Indian general election: Katihar
Party	Candidate	Votes	%	±%
ABJS	Gyaneshwar Prasad Yadav	96,422	35.05	▲14.39
INC	Sita Ram Keshri	83,533	30.37	▲7.83
CPI(M)	Ramanand Singh	31,993	11.63	
IUML	Ibrahim	29,008	10.55	
PSP	Gupta Priya	19,040	6.92	▼15.24
IND	2 Independent Candidates	4,564	1.66	
OTH	4 Other Party Candidates	10,503	3.82	
Majority		12,889	4.68	▲4.30
Turnout		286,377	50.80	▼4.28
Swing to ABJS from INC		Swing		

=== 1967 ===
1967 Indian general election: Katihar
Party	Candidate	Votes	%	±%
INC	S. Keshari	58,776	22.54	▼13.25
PSP	P. Gupta	57,803	22.16	▼23.28
ABJS	Y. P. Mandal	53,882	20.66	▲13.51
CPI	A. Ahmed	53,464	20.50	▲14.46
IND	C. M. Z. Haque	22,086	8.47	
SWA	S. K. Jha	14,809	5.68	▲0.09
Majority		973	0.38	▼9.27
Turnout		274,547	55.08	▲12.76
Swing to INC from PSP		Swing		

=== 1962 ===
1962 Indian general election: Katihar
Party	Candidate	Votes	%	±%
PSP	Priya Gupta	82,531	45.44	▲14.08
INC	Bhola Nath Biswas	64,994	35.79	▼18.73
ABJS	Nidhi Nath Jha	12,980	7.15	
CPI	Nazir Ahmad	10,961	6.04	
SWA	Punyanand Jha	10,143	5.59	
Majority		17,537	9.65	▼13.51
Turnout		190,900	42.32	
Swing to PSP from INC		Swing		

=== 1958 by-election ===
1958 Katihar by-election: Katihar
Party	Candidate	Votes	%	±%
INC	B. Biswas	57,290	54.52	▲2.64
PSP	Juvraj	32,952	31.36	▲17.34
IND	S. Haque	14,843	14.12	
Majority		24,338	23.16	▼12.63
Turnout				
INC hold		Swing		

=== 1957 ===
1957 Indian general election: Katihar
Party	Candidate	Votes	%	±%
INC	Awadhesh Kumar Singh	78,289	51.88	
IND	Safiqul Haque	24,283	16.09	
PSP	Arun Chandra Singh	21,160	14.02	
IND	Sheikh Usman Gani	13,628	9.03	
CPI	Rajkishore Singh	13,534	8.97	
Majority		54,006	35.79	
Turnout		150,894	40.05	
INC win (new seat)				

== See also ==
- Katihar district
- List of constituencies of the Lok Sabha
