= Tariq Anwar (politician) =

Member Of Parliament, Loksabha

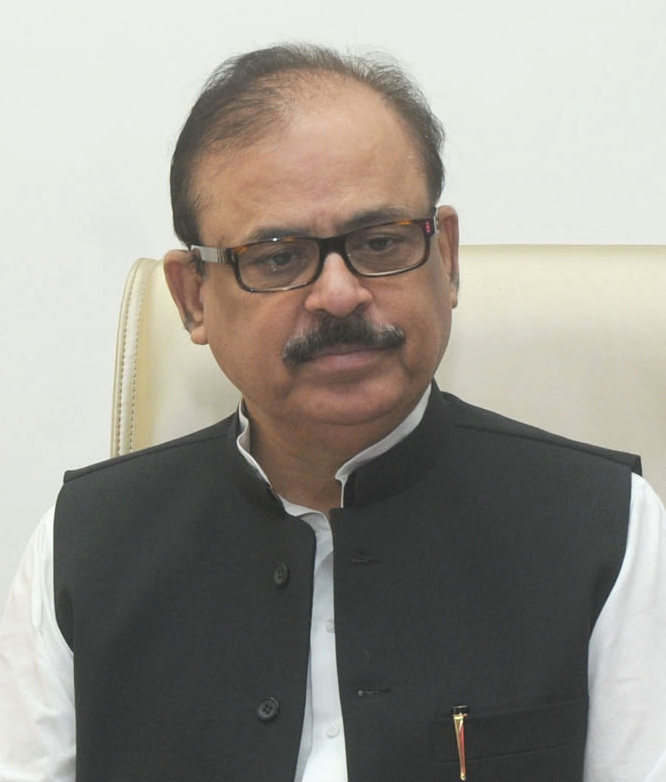

Member of Parliament, Lok Sabha
- Incumbent
- Assumed office 4 June 2024
- Preceded by: Dulal Chandra Goswami
- Constituency: Katihar
- In office 16 May 2014 – 27 October 2018
- Preceded by: Nikhil Kumar Choudhary
- Succeeded by: Dulal Chandra Goswami
- Constituency: Katihar
- In office 10 May 1996 – 26 April 1999
- Preceded by: Mohammad Yunus Saleem
- Succeeded by: Nikhil Kumar Choudhary
- Constituency: Katihar
- In office 1980–1989
- Preceded by: Yuvraj Singh
- Succeeded by: Yuvraj Singh
- Constituency: Katihar

General Secretary of AICC for Kerala & Lakshadweep
- In office 11 September 2020 – 23 December 2023
- Appointed by: Sonia Gandhi

Minister of State for Agriculture and Food Processing Industries
- In office 28 October 2012 – 16 May 2014
- Prime Minister: Manmohan Singh

Member of Parliament, Rajya Sabha
- In office 2004–2014
- Constituency: Maharashtra

20th President of Bihar Pradesh Congress Committee
- In office 1988–1989
- AICC President: Rajiv Gandhi
- Preceded by: Dumar Lal Baitha
- Succeeded by: Jagannath Mishra

6th President of Indian Youth Congress
- In office 1982–1985
- Preceded by: Ghulam Nabi Azad
- Succeeded by: Anand Sharma

Personal details
- Born: 16 January 1951 (age 75) Patna, Bihar, India
- Party: Indian National Congress (1972–1999; 2018–present)
- Other party: Nationalist Congress Party (1999–2018)
- Spouse: Hena Tariq (m. 2001)
- Children: 5
- Occupation: Politician

Tariq Anwar (born 16 January 1951) is an Indian politician from the Indian National Congress (INC), and a Member of Parliament representing Katihar (Lok Sabha constituency) in Bihar, India. He served as the Minister of State for Agriculture and Food Processing Industries between 2012 and 2014.

Anwar has been a member of the Indian Parliament for more than three decades – elected six times to the Lok Sabha, the lower house, from Katihar, and two times to the Rajya Sabha, the upper house, from Maharashtra. He quit the INC over a presidency dispute of the party in 1999 and formed the Nationalist Congress Party along with Sharad Pawar and P. A. Sangma, before resigning 19 years after, and re-joining the INC in 2018. Anwar has been appointed both general secretary in charge of poll-bound Kerala and a member of the Congress Working Committee (CWC).

== Early life ==
Tariq Anwar was born as Shah Tariq Anwar to Shah Mushtaque Ahmad, former Member of the Bihar Legislative Assembly from the Sikandra Assembly constituency and Bilquis Jahan on 16 January 1951 in Arwal, Bihar.

He is grandson of the Shah Mohammad Zubair, a freedom fighter. Brothers of his grandfather were Shah Mohammad Umair, Shah Zohair. His grandfather is known to be the maker of Shri Krishna Sinha.

He has a B.Sc degree from Magadh University, Bodh Gaya, Bihar.

== Career ==
Anwar joined the Indian National Congress in 1972. His political career began a student leader. He contested his first Lok Sabha election from Katihar on a Congress ticket in 1977 which he lost before winning three year later. He has been the national president of Indian Youth Congress. In 1989, he was offered the post of the minister of finance in the government of Bihar, headed by Satyendra Narayan Sinha.

In May 1999, Anwar along with other leaders of the INC, Sharad Pawar and P. A. Sangma, rebelled against a foreign-origin Sonia Gandhi being chosen as the party's Prime Minister-candidate ahead of the general election. In an open letter, they questioned her "experience and understanding of public life" in being able to rule a country "with a population of 980 million". A few days later, they were expelled from the party's prime membership for six years. They later quit the party and formed Nationalist Congress Party (NCP). However, the NCP chose to support the INC-led United Progressive Alliance for two terms at the centre between 2004 and 2014. In October 2012, Anwar was appointed Minister of State for Agriculture and Food Processing. During the time, he served as a member of the Rajya Sabha, the upper house of the Indian Parliament, representing Maharashtra.

In September 2018, he resigned from the NCP over colleague Pawar's clean chit to Prime Minister Narendra Modi in the Rafale deal controversy, and re-joined the INC the following month.

== See also ==
- Indian National Congress
- Katihar Lok Sabha constituency

Party political offices
Preceded by Sharad Pawar	Leader of the Nationalist Congress Party in the 16th Lok Sabha; 2014–2018
