= Katihar Junction railway station =

Railway station in Katihar, Bihar, India

Katihar Junction कटिहार जंक्शन
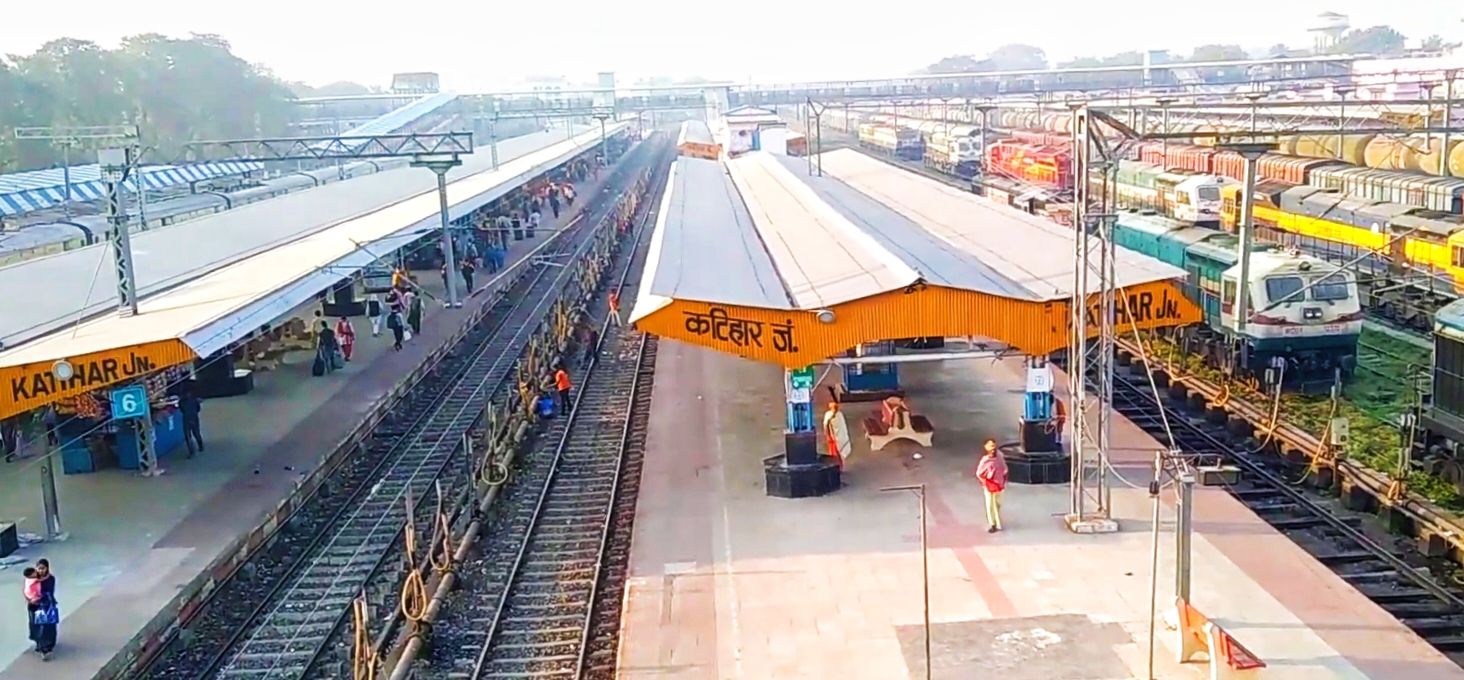
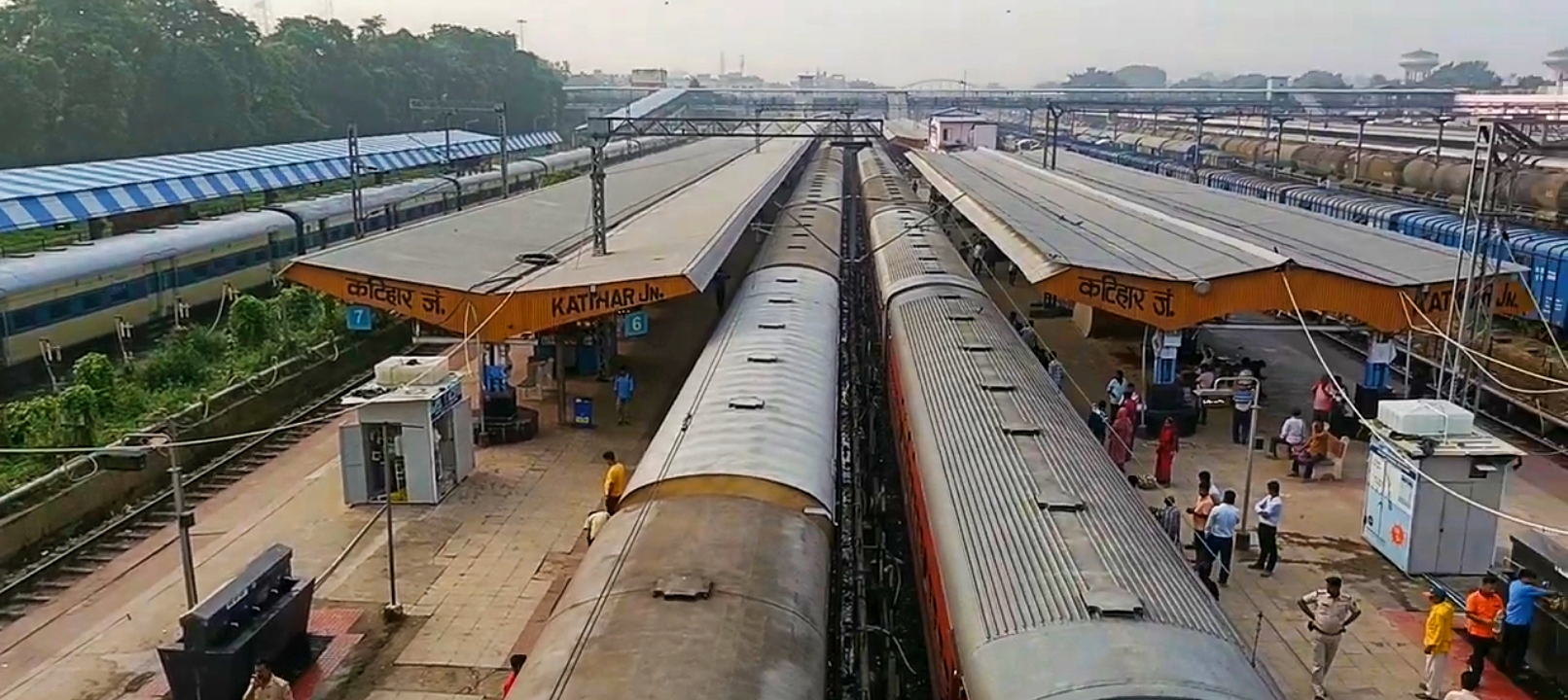
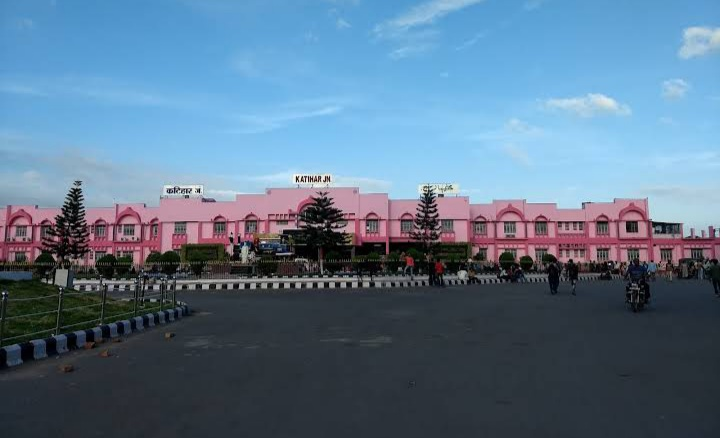
- Katihar Junction Railway Station

General information
- Location: Station Road, Katihar- 854105 Bihar; India
- Coordinates: 25.54869°N 87.56615°E
- Elevation: 35 metres (115 ft)
- System: Regional rail & commuter rail station
- Owner: Indian Railways
- Operator: Northeast Frontier Railway
- Lines: Barauni–Guwahati line; Barauni–Katihar section; Jogbani–Katihar line; Katihar–Siliguri line; Katihar–Teznarayanpur branch line
- Platforms: 9 (8 Main + 1 Manihari Terminal)
- Tracks: 16
- Connections: Taxi, auto-rickshaw

Construction
- Structure type: At grade
- Parking: Available
- Cycle facilities: Available
- Accessible: Yes

Other information
- Status: Functioning
- Station code: KIR
- Zone(s): Northeast Frontier Railway
- Division(s): Katihar

History
- Opened: 1889
- Electrified: 2016 Yes (April,2017)
- Former names: East Indian Railway

Passengers
- 200K/day (▲ high)

Services
Northeast Frontier Railway zone
Preceding station	Indian Railways	Following station
Terminus	Barauni–Katihar section	Purnia towards Barauni Junction
Terminus	Barauni–Katihar section Teznarayanpur branch	Mansahi towards Teznarayanpur
Barauni towards ?	Katihar–Siliguri line Towards New Jalpaiguri	Barsoi towards ?
Barauni towards ?	Katihar–Siliguri line Towards Malda Town	Kumedpur towards ?

Other services
Location
- Location within Bihar
- Interactive map

Katihar Junction railway station serves Katihar city in Katihar district in the Indian state of Bihar. It is an A1 Category railway station of Katihar Division. The Katihar Junction railway station is connected to most of the major cities in India by the railway network. It is amongst the top 100 booking stations of Indian Railways.

Katihar lies in between Barauni–Katihar section of Barauni–Guwahati line
Katihar–Siliguri line which serves the city with numerous trains to Guwahati, Kolkata, Delhi, Mumbai, Patna, Gorakhpur, Lucknow and with many other cities. It is ISO certified ISO 14001:2015 for its clean and green environment throughout the station premises.

== History ==
East Indian Railway Company opened the Manihari–Katihar–Kasba section in 1888 and the North Bengal Railway opened the Katihar–Raiganj section the same year. The Barsoi–Kishanganj section opened in 1889. All these lines were 1,000 mm (3 ft 3 3/8 in)-wide metre-gauge lines. Darjeeling Himalayan Railway, operating 2 ft (610 mm) narrow-gauge lines, extended their operations from Siliguri to Kishanganj in 1915 and to Dalkhola.

Siliguri was connected to Kolkata via the eastern part of Bengal since 1878 (for details see Howrah–New Jalpaiguri line). However, with the partition of India in 1947, railway services in the region were completely disrupted. In 1949, the narrow-gauge Siliguri–Kishanganj section was upgraded to metre gauge. Thus there was a direct metre-gauge connection from Manihari to Siliguri via Katihar. The importance of Katihar station grew because of the jute mill in the region.

== Development ==
In the early 1960s, when Farakka Barrage was being constructed, Indian Railways took the initiative to extend 5 ft 6 in (1,676 mm) broad-gauge rail link from Kolkata.

The 2,240 m (7,350 ft) long Farakka Barrage carries a rail-cum-road bridge across the Ganges. The rail bridge was opened in 1971 thereby linking the Barharwa–Azimganj–Katwa loop to Malda, New Jalpaiguri and other railway stations in North Bengal.

Gauge conversion work (from metre gauge to broad gauge) in the Barauni–Katihar section was taken up in 1978–79 and completed in 1982.

The Siliguri–Katihar line was the last surviving metre-gauge line in the area. The Aluabari Road–Katihar section already had a broad-gauge line running alongside the metre-gauge line. The Aluabari Road–Siliguri section needed to be converted. Conversion work was taken up in 2008; train services in the section were suspended and conversion work was completed early in 2011.

== Station facilities ==
The following services are available in Katihar Jn. railway station:

- 10 (02 bedded) AC retiring rooms
- 05 (02 bedded) non AC retiring rooms
- 01 (08 bedded) AC dormitory
- 04 (01 bedded) AC cabin dormitory
- 01 (06 bedded) non AC dormitory
- Executive lounge
- High speed Google railwire free Wi-Fi service
- Upper class/lower class waiting rooms with free Wi-Fi/AC/TV/charging points/drinking water & separate ladies'/gents' washrooms
- Food plaza
- Tea stall
- FOB with 4X escalator/elevators 3X
- CCTV surveillance

== Platforms ==
Katihar Junction railway station
- Katihar junction Manihari terminal
Location

There are eight functional platforms at Main terminal which are interconnected and have multiple foot overbridges. There is also one platform at the Manihari terminal, which is located a few meters from the main Katihar Junction terminal.

== Gallery ==
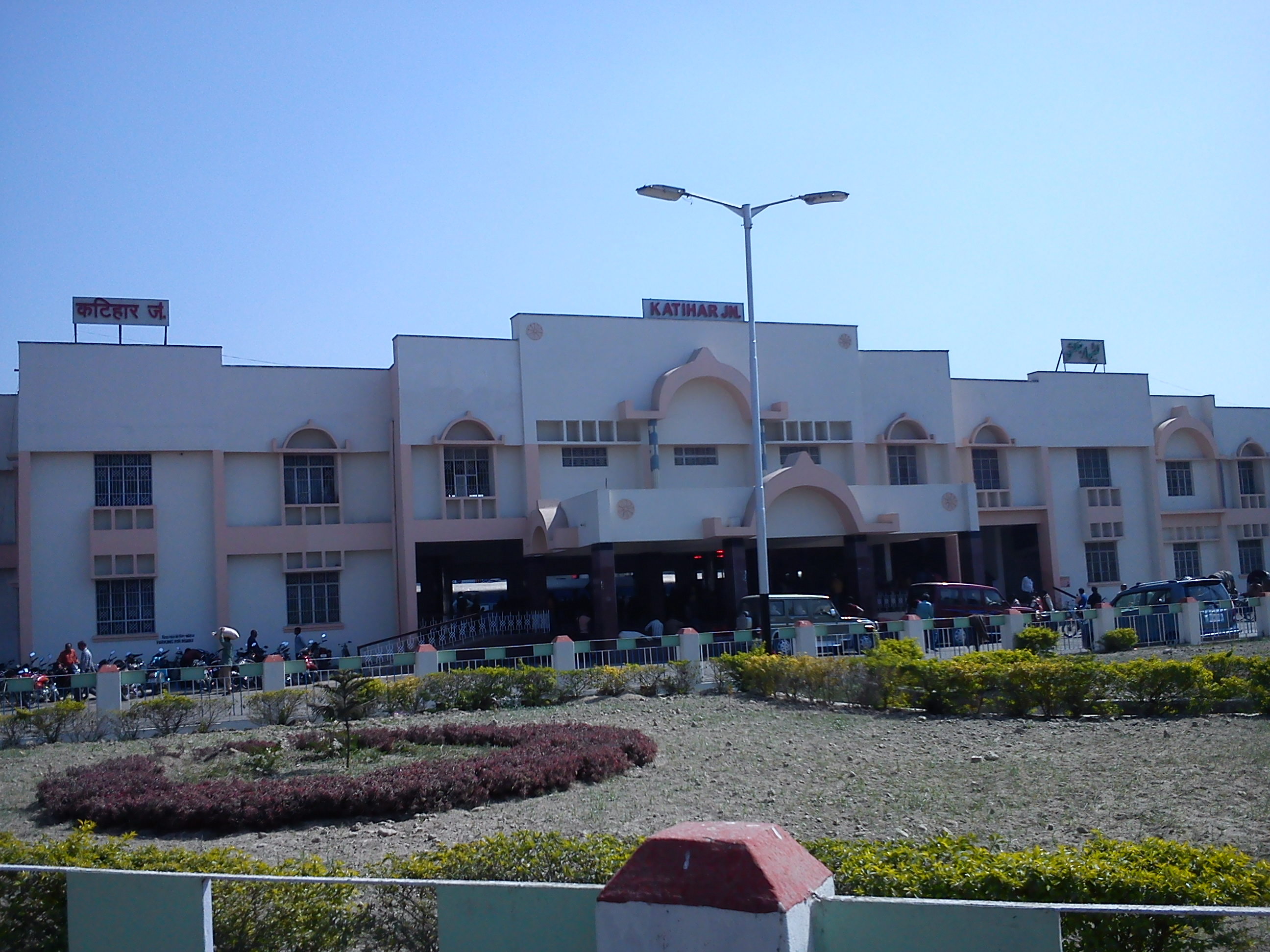
Katihar Station

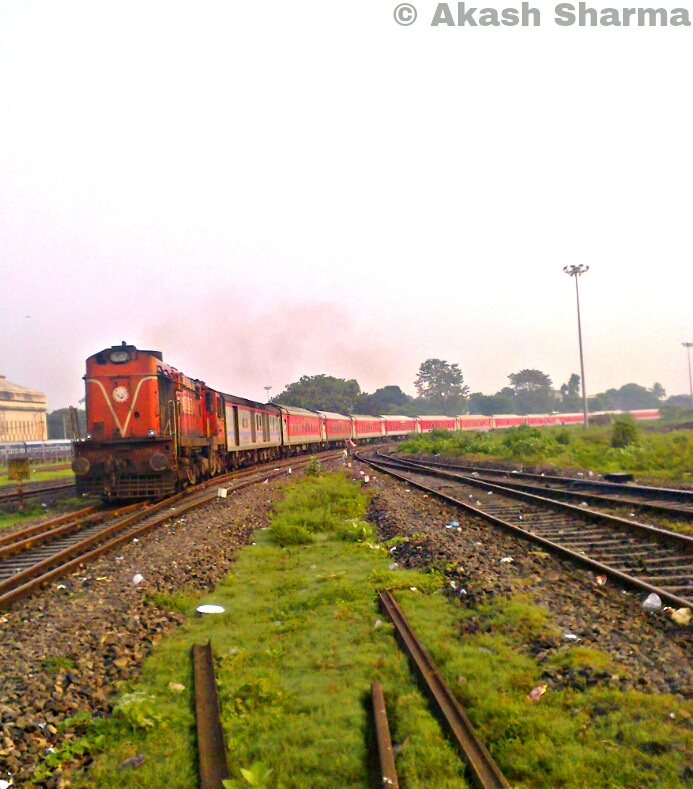
Kamakhya–Lokmanya Tilak Terminus AC Express entering Katihar

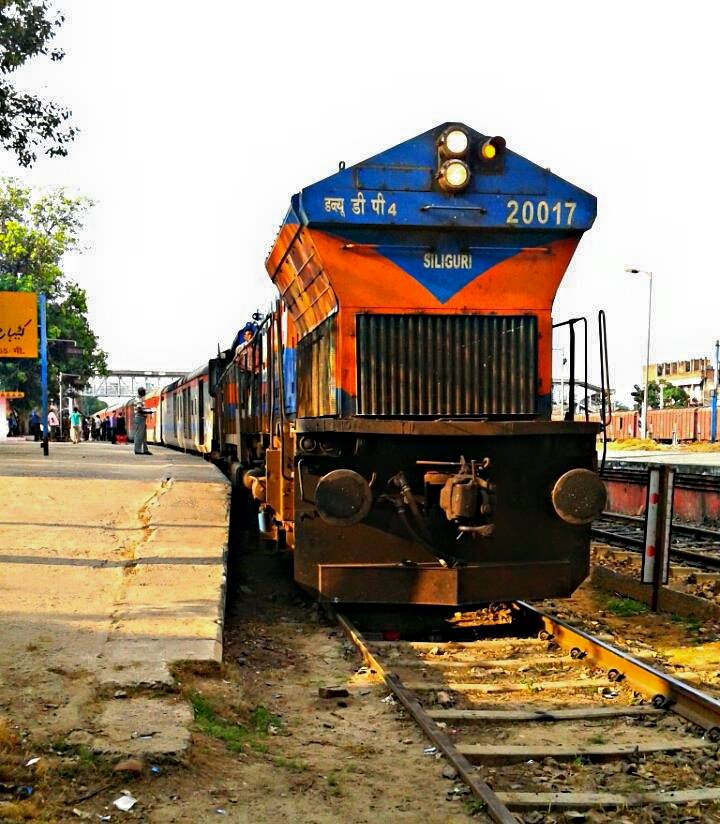
12423 Dibrugarh–New Delhi Rajdhani Express waiting to depart Katihar

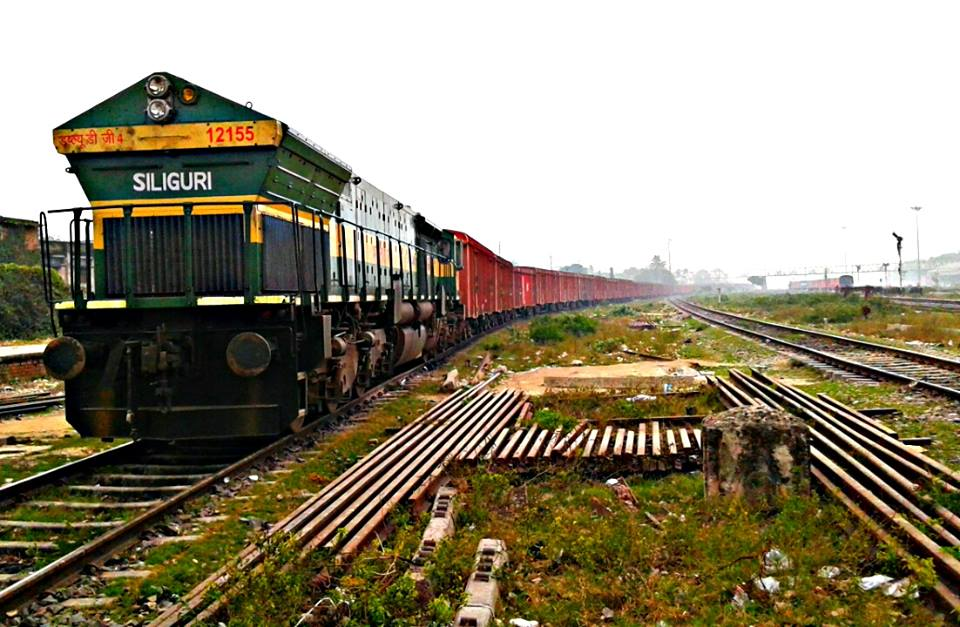
A Siliguri-based WDG-4 with a freight train entering Katihar Junction

== See also ==
- Patna Metro
- Purnia Airport
- Northeast Frontier Railway zone
- Azamnagar Road railway station
- Barsoi Junction railway station
- Bhawanipur Bihar railway station
- Khurial railway station
- Mukuria railway station
- Salmari railway station
- Sanjay Gram railway station
- Sudhani railway station
- Telta railway station
- Teznarayanpur railway station

Preceding station	Indian Railways	Following station
Terminus	Northeast Frontier Railway zone Katihar–Siliguri line	Dandkhora towards ?
Terminus	Northeast Frontier Railway zone Katihar–Barsoi branch line	Kumedpur towards ?
Terminus	Northeast Frontier Railway zone Barauni–Katihar section	Semapur towards ?
Terminus	Northeast Frontier Railway zone Katihar–Teznarayanpur branch line	Mansi towards ?
Terminus	Northeast Frontier Railway zone Jogbani–Katihar line	Dalan towards ?
