= Nawaz =

Nawaz (Persian: نواز, romanized: one who caresses; transliterations vary) may refer to:

== Given name ==
- Gharib Nawaz (1143–1236), Indian Sufi saint
- Bande Nawaz (1321–1422), Indian Sufi saint
- Gharib Niwaz Pamheiba (1690–1751), King of Manipur
- Samsam ud Daula Shah Nawaz Khan (1700–1758), Mughal courtier and historian
- Ali Nawaz Jung Bahadur (born 1877), Hyderabadi civil engineer
- Moin Nawaz Jung, Hyderabadi finance minister
- Shah Nawaz Bhutto (1888–1957), dewan of Junagadh
- Mehdi Nawaz Jung (1894–1967), Hyderabadi bureaucrat
- Qazi Qader Newaz (1909–1983), Bangladeshi poet
- Shah Nawaz Khan (1914–1983), Indian general
- Muhammad Nawaz (1924–2004), Pakistani javelin thrower
- Khaleque Nawaz Khan (1926–1971), Bangladeshi politician and lawyer
- Asif Nawaz Khan Janjua (1937–1993), Pakistani army chief
- Nawaz Khizar (born 1942), Pakistani hockey player
- Muhammad Nawaz Abbasi (born 1943), Pakistani justice
- Muhammad Nawaz Khan (born 1943), Pakistani writer
- Fareed Nawaz Khan Noohani Baloch (1946–2001), Pakistani television and radio artist
- Sarfraz Nawaz Malik (born 1948), Pakistani cricketer
- Muhammad Nawaz Bhatti (1948–2006), Pakistani high court judge
- Nawaz Sharif (born 1949), former Prime Minister of Pakistan
- Moin Nawaz Warraich (born 1949), Pakistani military officer
- Rai Hassan Nawaz (born 1955), Pakistani politician
- Arshad Nawaz (born 1955), Pakistani cricketer
- Muhammad Nawaz (1957–2011), Pakistani major general
- Shahnawaz Bhutto (1958–1985), Pakistani democracy activist
- Md. Nobi Newaz (born 1966), Bangladeshi politician
- Mohammad Nawaz Alam (born 1967), Indian politician
- Shahid Nawaz (born 1970), Pakistani cricketer
- Mohammad Nawaz (born 1970), Pakistani cricketer
- Muhammad Nawaz Irfani (1970–2014), Pakistani politician and supreme leader of Parachinar
- Ali Nawaz Khan Mahar (born 1972), Pakistani politician
- Naveed Nawaz (born 1973), Sri Lankan cricketer
- Nawazuddin Siddiqui (born 1974), Indian actor
- Mohammad Nawaz (born 1974), Pakistani cricketer
- Nawaz Haq (born 1981), Pakistani track and field athlete
- Fazrul Nawaz (born 1985), Singaporean footballer
- Nawaz Dad Khan (born 1985), Pakistani boxer
- Nawaz Ahmed (born 1986), Pakistani cricketer
- Nabib Newaz Jibon (born 1990), Bangladeshi footballer
- Mohammad Nawaz (born 1994), Pakistani cricketer
- Shahid Nawaz (born 1996), Pakistani cricketer
- Mohammad Nawaz (born 2000), Manipuri footballer
- Hassan Nawaz (born 2004), Pakistani cricketer
- Muhammad Shah Newaz Chowdhury (died 1997), Bangladeshi politician
- Hamid Nawaz Khan (died 2014), Pakistani army general
- Mohammad Nawaz Khokhar (died 2021), Pakistani politician
- Ali Nawaz Chowhan (died 2023), former Chief Justice of Gambia
- Adnan Nawaz, British-Pakistani television presenter
- Ahmed Nawaz Baloch, Pakistani politician
- Ali Nawaz Awan, Pakistani politician
- Ali Newaz Mahmud Khaiyam, Bangladeshi politician
- Gohar Nawaz Khan, Pakistani politician
- Muhammad Nawaz Khan Allai, Pakistani politician
- Muhammad Nawaz Khan Kakar, Pakistani politician
- Newaz Halima Arli, Bangladeshi politician
- Raja Rab Nawaz, Pakistani navy admiral
- Shah Newaz, Bangladeshi communist

== Surname ==
- Amna Nawaz (born 1979), American broadcast journalist
- Danish Nawaz Khan Noohani Baloch (born 1978), Pakistani comedian
- Dilip Nawaz, Sri Lankan puisne justice of the Supreme Court
- Maajid Usman Nawaz (born 1977), British-Pakistani political activist
- Rab Nawaz (1940–2026), Pakistani cricketer and umpire
- Sana Nawaz, Pakistani film actress and model
- Tawfique Nawaz, Bangladeshi advocate
- Umar Nawaz (footballer) (born 2008), Pakistani footballer
- Yasir Nawaz Khan Noohani Baloch (born 1970), Pakistani director, producer and screenwriter

== Fictional characters ==
- Alya Nawaz, fictional character from Ackley Bridge
- Farida Nawaz. fictional character from Ackley Bridge
- Riz Nawaz, fictional character from Ackley Bridge
- Sadiq Nawaz, fictional character from Ackley Bridge

== Places ==
- Khaja Bandanawaz University, Karnataka
- Masjid Ghareeb Nawaz, Manipur
- Muhammad Nawaz Sharif University of Engineering & Technology, Pakistan
- Nawaz Sharif Medical College, Pakistan

== Transport ==
- Kishanganj–Ajmer Garib Nawaz Express, India
- Bangalore City–Ajmer Garib Nawaz Express, India
- Ranchi–Ajmer Garib Nawaz Express, India

== See also ==
- Nawazish
- Go Nawaz Go
