= KSR Bangalore–Gandhidham Express =

Train in India

Gandhidham–KSR Bengaluru Express
Overview
- Service type: Express
- First service: 11 July 2002; 23 years ago
- Current operator: South Western Railway

Route
- Termini: Gandhidham Junction (GIMB) [[ railway station, KSR Bengaluru|]] (SBC)
- Stops: 30
- Distance travelled: 1,954 km (1,214 mi)
- Average journey time: 38 hrs 10 mins
- Service frequency: Weekly (Note: Runs one day in a week for every direction.)
- Train number: 16505 / 16506

On-board services
- Classes: AC 1st Class, AC 2 tier, AC 3 tier, Sleeper class, General Unreserved
- Seating arrangements: Yes
- Sleeping arrangements: Yes
- Catering facilities: On-board catering E-catering
- Observation facilities: Large windows
- Baggage facilities: Available
- Other facilities: Below the seats

Technical
- Rolling stock: LHB coach
- Track gauge: 1,676 mm (5 ft 6 in)
- Operating speed: 51 km/h (32 mph) average including halts
Route map
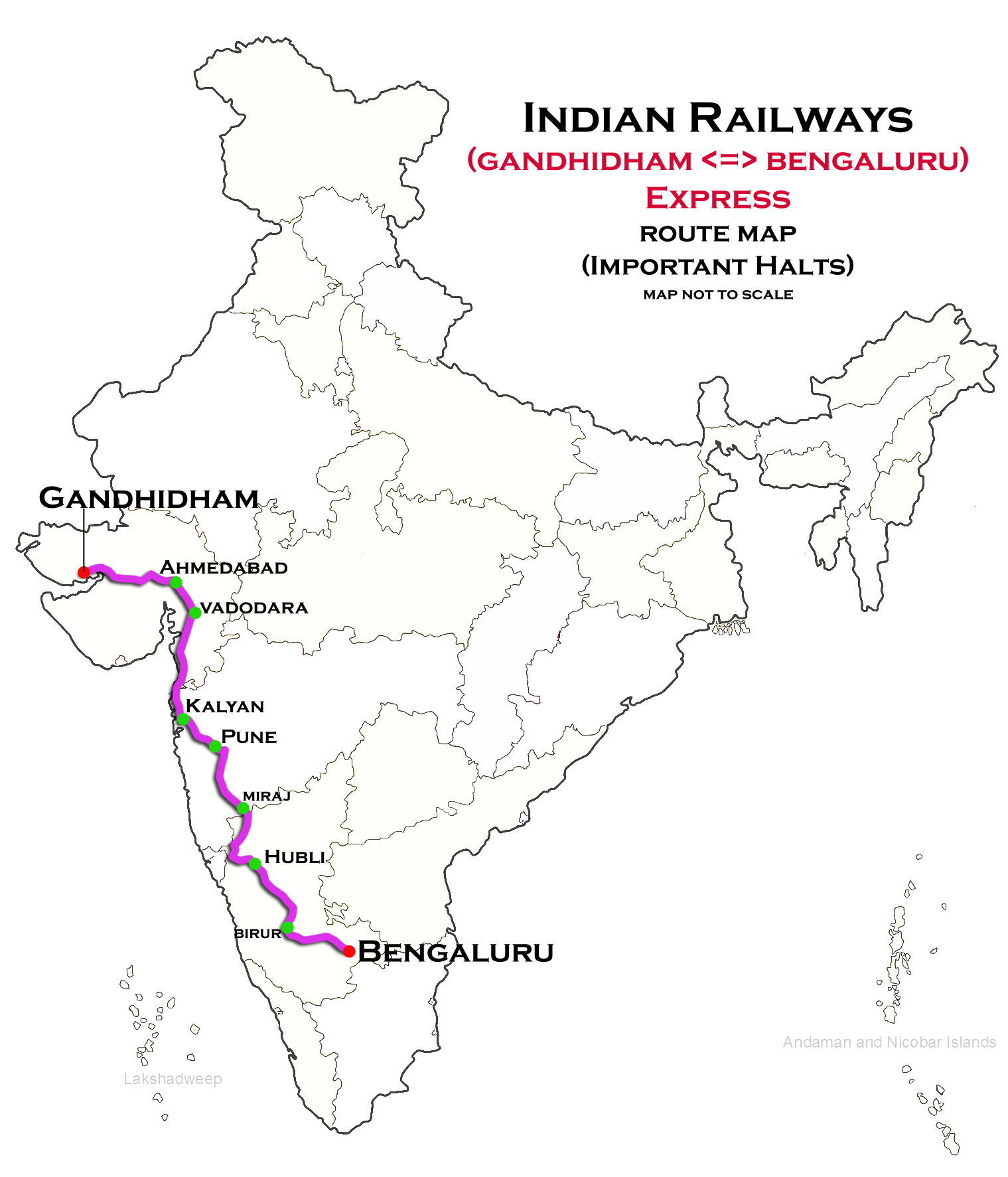

The 16505 / 16506 Gandhidham–KSR Bengaluru Express is an Express train belonging to South Western Railway zone that runs between Gandhidham Junction and KSR Bengaluru in India. It is currently being operated with 16505/16506 train numbers on a weekly basis.

== Service ==
- The 16505/Gandhidham–KSR Bengaluru Express has an average speed of 46 km/h and covers 1955 km in 42 hrs 15 mins.
- The 16506/KSR Bengaluru–Gandhidham Express has an average speed of 51 km/h and covers 1955 km in 38 hrs 40 mins.

== Route and halts ==
The important halts of the train are:

- Gandhidham Junction
- Ahmedabad Junction
- Vadodara Junction
- Surat
- Vasai Road
- Bhiwandi Road
- Kalyan Junction
- Karjat
- Lonavala
- Pune Junction
- Satara
- Miraj Junction
- Belagavi
- Londa Junction
- Dharwad
- Hubballi Junction
- Arsikere Junction
- Yesvantpur Junction
- KSR Bengaluru City

== Coach composition ==
Earlier was ICF rakes, and now The train has standard LHB rakes with a maximum speed of 110 km/h. The train consists of 22 coaches:

- 1 AC I Tier
- 2 AC II Tier
- 6 AC III Tier
- 7 Sleeper coaches
- 2 General Unreserved
- 1 Seating cum Luggage Rake
- 1 Pantry car
- 2 Generator Cars (EOG)

Loco	1	2	3	4	5	6	7	8	9	10	11	12	13	14	15	16	17	18	19	20	21	22
	SLR	EOG	GEN	H1	A1	A2	B1	B2	B3	B4	B5	B6	S1	S2	S3	PC	S4	S5	S6	S7	GEN	EOG

As is customary with most train services in India, coach composition may be amended at the discretion of Indian Railways depending on demand.

== Schedule ==
Train number	Station code	Departure station	Departure time	Departure day	Arrival station	Arrival time	Arrival day
16505	GIMB	Gandhidham Junction	09:00 AM	Tue	Bangalore City	03:15 AM	Thu
16506	SBC	Bangalore City	10:20 PM	Sat	Gandhidham Junction	11:00 AM	Mon

== Traction ==
earlier first run was with WDP-4. Both trains are hauled by a Krishnarajapuram loco shed based WAP-7 Electric locomotive from KSR Bengaluru to Gandhidham and vice versa.

== Rake sharing ==
The train shares its rake with;

- 16573/16574 Yesvantpur–Puducherry Weekly Express,
- 16533/16534 Jodhpur–Bangalore City Express (via Guntakal),
- 16533/16534 Ajmer–Bangalore City Garib Nawaz Express
- 16507/16508 Jodhpur–Bangalore City Express (via Hubballi).

== See also ==
- Bangalore City railway station
- Gandhidham Junction railway station
- Yesvantpur–Puducherry Weekly Express
- Jodhpur–Bangalore City Express (via Guntakal)
- Ajmer–Bangalore City Garib Nawaz Express
- Jodhpur–Bangalore City Express (via Hubballi)
