= Muzaffarpur–SMVT Bengaluru Weekly Express =

Train in India

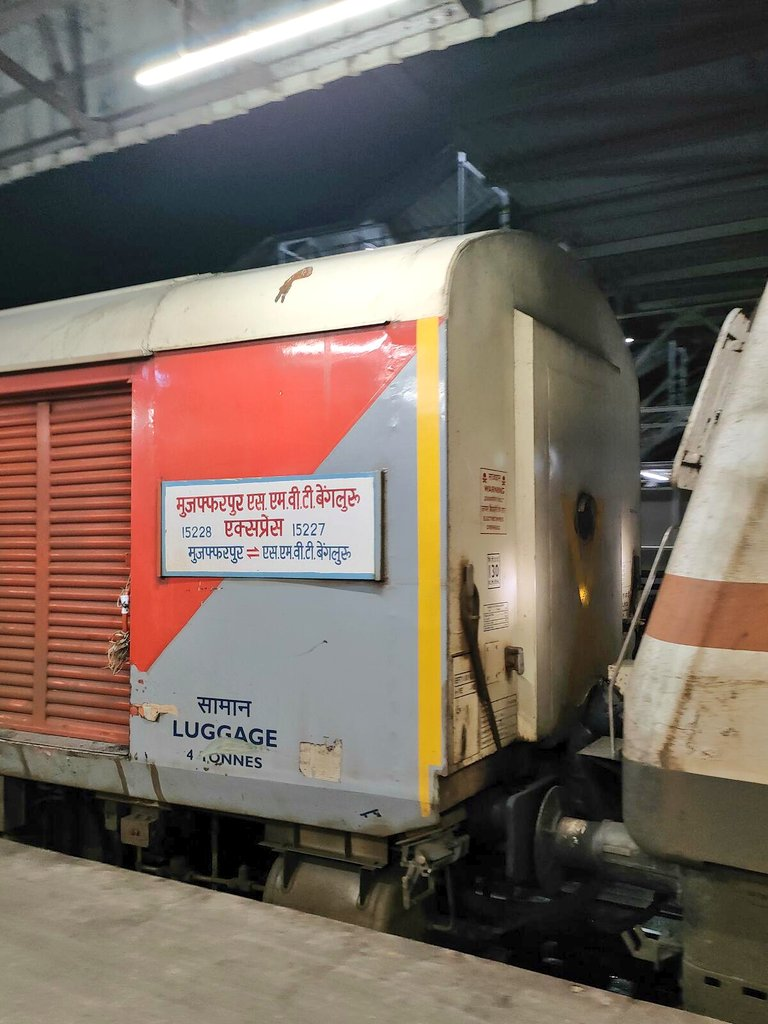

Overview
- Service type: Express
- Status: Active
- Locale: Bihar, West Bengal, Jharkhand, Odisha, Andhra Pradesh, Tamil Nadu & Karnataka
- First service: Janauray 12, 2004
- Current operator: East Central Railways

Route
- Service frequency: Weekly
- Train number: 15228 / 15227

On-board services
- Classes: AC 1 Tier, AC 2 Tier, AC 3 Tier, AC 3 Economy, Sleeper class & General Unreserved
- Seating arrangements: Yes
- Sleeping arrangements: Yes
- Catering facilities: Available
- Observation facilities: Large windows
- Entertainment facilities: No
- Baggage facilities: Below the seats

Technical
- Rolling stock: LHB coach
- Track gauge: 1,676 mm (5 ft 6 in)
- Operating speed: 130 km/h (68 mph) maximum, 50–55 km/h (31–34 mph) average including halts

The Muzaffarpur–SMVT Bengaluru Express is a long-distance express train of the Indian Railways connecting Muzaffarpur Junction in Bihar with SMVT Bengaluru in Karnataka via Malda Town, Rampurhat, Kharagpur. It is operated by the East Central Railway (ECR) making it one of the important rail links between North Bihar and South India.

== History ==
The Muzaffarpur–SMVT Bengaluru Express (train numbers 15227/15228) was earlier operated with its terminal at Yesvantpur Junction (YPR). With effect from 18 July 2022, its terminal was shifted to SMVT Bengaluru (SMVB)

== Schedule ==
15228 / 15227 Muzaffarpur–SMVT Bengaluru Express Schedule
Train Type	Express
Distance	~2670 km (15228) / ~2670 km (15227)
Average Speed	~53 km/h
Journey Time (MFP → SMVT Bengaluru)	~50 hrs 20 min
Journey Time (SMVT Bengaluru → MFP)	~49 hrs 15 min
Classes Available	1A, 2A, 3A, SL, GN
Operating Days	Weekly
Operator	East Central Railway

== Coach composition ==
Category	Coaches	Total
End On Generator Car (EOG)	EOG	1
General Unreserved (UR)	UR1, UR2, UR3, UR4	4
Sleeper Class (SL)	S1, S2, S3, S4, S5, S6	6
AC 3 Economy (3E)	3E	1
AC 3 Tier (3A)	B1, B2, B3, B4, B5	5
AC 2 Tier (2A)	A1, A2	2
AC First Class (1A)	H1	1
Sleeper cum Luggage Rake (SLRD)	SLRD	1
Pantry Car	PC	1
Total Coaches		22

- Primary Maintenance - Muzaffarpur Coaching Depot

15228 Muzaffarpur–SMVT Bengaluru Express and 15227 SMVT Bengaluru–Muzaffarpur Express Schedule
Sr.	15228 MFP–SMVB				15227 SMVB–MFP			
Sr.	Station	Day	Arr.	Dep.	Station	Day	Arr.	Dep.
1	Muzaffarpur Junction	1	—	07:25	SMVT Bengaluru	1	—	00:30
2	Samastipur Junction	1	08:20	08:25	Krishnarajapuram	1	00:43	00:45
3	Barauni Junction	1	09:20	09:30	Bangarapet Junction	1	01:23	01:25
4	Begusarai	1	09:46	09:48	Jolarpettai Junction	1	03:10	03:15
5	Khagaria Junction	1	10:28	10:30	Katpadi Junction	1	04:35	04:50
6	Naugachia	1	11:31	11:33	Arakkonam Junction	1	05:48	05:50
7	Katihar Junction	1	13:30	13:40	Perambur	1	06:35	06:40
8	Kumedpur	1	14:20	14:22	Vijayawada Junction	1	14:00	14:10
9	Malda Town	1	15:55	16:05	Rajahmundry	1	16:38	16:40
10	Pakur	1	17:14	17:15	Visakhapatnam	1	21:25	21:45
11	Rampurhat	1	18:25	18:27	Vizianagaram Junction	1	22:38	22:40
12	Bolpur Shantiniketan	1	19:07	19:12	Srikakulam Road	1	23:28	23:30
13	Dankuni	1	22:07	22:12	Palasa	2	00:38	00:40
14	Kharagpur Junction	2	01:03	01:13	Brahmapur	2	01:30	01:35
15	Balasore	2	02:26	02:28	Balugan	2	02:27	02:29
16	Bhadrak	2	04:15	04:17	Khurda Road Junction	2	03:20	03:30
17	Jajpur Keonjhar Road	2	04:51	04:53	Bhubaneswar	2	04:05	04:10
18	Cuttack	2	05:50	05:55	Cuttack	2	04:45	04:50
19	Bhubaneswar	2	06:30	06:35	Jajpur Keonjhar Road	2	05:43	05:45
20	Khurda Road Junction	2	06:55	07:15	Bhadrak	2	06:35	06:37
21	Balugan	2	08:17	08:19	Balasore	2	07:20	07:22
22	Brahmapur	2	09:10	09:15	Kharagpur Junction	2	08:55	09:05
23	Palasa	2	10:55	10:57	Dankuni	2	11:26	11:31
24	Srikakulam Road	2	11:48	11:50	Bolpur Shantiniketan	2	13:07	13:09
25	Vizianagaram Junction	2	12:45	12:50	Rampurhat	2	13:59	14:01
26	Visakhapatnam	2	14:20	14:40	Pakur	2	14:45	14:46
27	Rajahmundry	2	17:13	17:15	Malda Town	2	16:55	17:05
28	Vijayawada Junction	2	19:45	19:55	Kumedpur	2	18:05	18:07
29	Perambur	3	03:00	03:05	Katihar Junction	2	19:25	19:35
30	Arakkonam Junction	3	03:48	03:50	Naugachia	2	20:13	20:15
31	Katpadi Junction	3	04:45	04:50	Khagaria Junction	2	21:17	21:19
32	Jolarpettai Junction	3	06:10	06:25	Begusarai	2	21:49	21:51
33	Bangarapet Junction	3	07:43	07:45	Barauni Junction	2	22:25	22:35
34	Krishnarajapuram	3	08:38	08:40	Samastipur Junction	2	23:45	23:50
35	SMVT Bengaluru	3	09:45	—	Muzaffarpur Junction	3	01:45	—

== Direction reversal ==
The train reverses its direction 1 time:

- Visakhapatnam Junction

== See also ==
- Yesvantpur Junction railway station
- Muzaffarpur Junction railway station
- Bagmati Express
- Barauni–Ernakulam Raptisagar Express
