= Garib Nawaz Express =

Garib Nawaz Express may refer to these passenger trains in India named after the Sufi saint Mu'in al-Din Chishti, running to and from Ajmer, Rajasthan (home of the Shrine of Mu'in al-Din Chishti):

- Kishanganj–Ajmer Garib Nawaz Express
- Bangalore City–Ajmer Garib Nawaz Express
- Ranchi–Ajmer Garib Nawaz Express

== See also ==
- Gharib Nawaz (disambiguation)
- Kolkata–Madar Express
