= Gharib Nawaz =

Gharib Nawaz may refer to:

- Mu'in al-Din Chishti (also Garib Nawaz and Khwaja Garib Nawaz, 1141–1230), Persian Sufi saint, founder of the Chishti Order of Sufism in India
  - Shrine of Mu'in al-Din Chishti, tomb of the saint in Ajmer, Rajasthan, India
    - Urs festival, Ajmer, annual festival held at the shrine on his death anniversary
  - Masjid Ghareeb Nawaz, a mosque in Nagpur, Maharashtra, India
  - Khwaja Moinuddin Chishti Language University, Uttar Pradesh, India
  - Garib Nawaz Express (disambiguation)
- Gharib Niwaz (Manipur), name taken by king Pamheiba of Manipur (1690–1751) following his conversion to Hinduism

== See also ==
- Gharib (disambiguation)
- Nawaz, an Arabic male given name
- Gharib Nawaz Mosque in Mominpura, Nagpur
