= KSR Bengaluru–Jodhpur Express =

KSR Bengaluru–Jodhpur Express may refer to these passenger trains in India running between Bangalore City railway station (Karnataka) and Jodhpur railway station (Rajasthan):

- KSR Bangalore–Bhagat Ki Kothi Express (via Guntakal)
- KSR Bangalore–Jodhpur Express (via Davangere)
