= Gharib =

Gharib, Ghareeb, Gharieb, Ghorayeb, Ghraib, or Ghrieb may refer to:

== People ==
=== Given name ===
- Gharib Amzine (born 1973), Moroccan football player
- Gharib Asqalani, Palestinian writer
- Gharib Mirza (died 1498), imam
- Gharib Nawaz (saint), Persian Islamic scholar
- Gharib Niwaz (Manipur), king of Manipur
- Gharib Shah (d. 1629), Iranian aristocrat who rebelled against Safavid rule in 1629/30, but was defeated and later executed

=== Surname ===
- Abbas Gharib (born 1942), Italian-based architect of Iranian origin
- Abdulrahman Ghareeb (born 1997), Saudi Arabian football winger
- Amir al-Arabi Ali Gharib, Libyan diplomat
- Badr al-Zaman Gharib (1929 – 2020), Iranian linguist
- Burhanuddin Gharib (d. 1344), Indian Sufi belonging to the Chishti Order
- Edmund Ghareeb, Lebanese-American academic
- Fadil Mahmud Gharib, Iraqi politician
- Georges El-Ghorayeb, Lebanese Scouting leader
- Hanna Gharib, Lebanese communist leader
- Hossein Gharib (born 1940), Iranian medical researcher and author
- Ignatius Abraham bar Gharib, Syriac Orthodox Patriarch of Mardin
- Jaouad Gharib (born 1972), Moroccan long-distance runner
- Laure Ghorayeb, Lebanese artist
- Mohammad Ghareeb (born 1980), Kuwaiti tennis player
- Mohammad Gharib (1909–1975), Iranian physician, clinician, professor and pioneer of pediatrics in Iran
  - Roozegar-e Gharib, TV series about Gharib
- Mohie El Din El Ghareeb, Egyptian economist
- Rayan Ghrieb (born 1999), French footballer
- Tareq Al-Ghareeb (born 1961), Kuwaiti judoka
- Rose Ghorayeb, Lebanese writer
- Shawky Gharib (born 1959), Egyptian football player
- Sifi Ghrieb, prime minister of Algeria
- Susie Gharib (born 1950), American business news journalist and TV anchor
- Shapoor Gharib (1933–2012), Iranian director and screenwriter

== Other uses ==
- Gharib (Hadith terminology), in Arabic غَرِيْب, a hadith conveyed by only one narrator
- Gharib (crater), crater near the north pole of Saturn's moon Enceladus
- Gharib (film), 2023 Iranian film
- Gharib Church, also known as St. Georg Church, a historical church in Isfahan, Iran

== See also ==
- Garib (disambiguation)
- Gharib Nawaz (disambiguation)
- Qarib, a village in Iran
