= Yesvantpur–Puducherry Weekly Express =

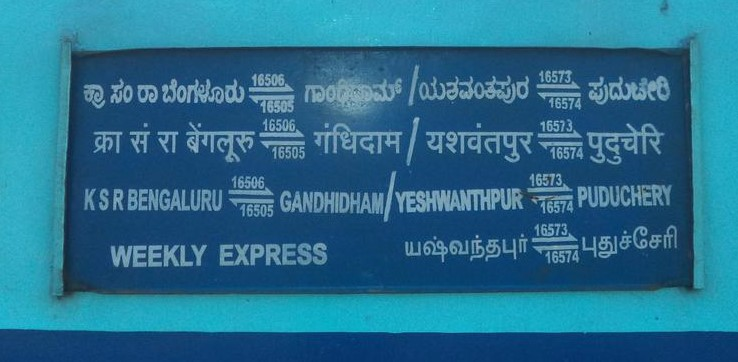

Overview
- Service type: Express
- First service: 21 March 2017; 8 years ago
- Current operator: South Western Railway zone

Route
- Termini: Yesvantpur Junction (YPR); Puducherry (PDY)
- Stops: 8
- Distance travelled: 456 km (283 mi)
- Average journey time: 10h 15m
- Service frequency: Weekly (Note: Runs one day in a week for every direction.)
- Train number: 16573/16574

On-board services
- Classes: AC 2 tier, AC 3 tier, Sleeper class, General Unreserved
- Seating arrangements: No
- Sleeping arrangements: Yes
- Catering facilities: On-board catering E-catering
- Observation facilities: LHB coach
- Entertainment facilities: No
- Baggage facilities: No
- Other facilities: Below the seats

Technical
- Rolling stock: 2
- Track gauge: 1,676 mm (5 ft 6 in)
- Operating speed: 44 km/h (27 mph), including halts

The Yesvantpur–Puducherry Weekly Express is an Express train belonging to South Western Railway zone that runs between Yesvantpur Junction and Puducherry in India. It is currently being operated with 16573/16574 train numbers on a weekly basis.

== Service ==
The 16573/Yesvantpur–Puducherry Weekly Express has an average speed of 44 km/h and covers 456 km in 10h 15m. The 16574/Puducherry–Yesvantpur Weekly Express has an average speed of 40 km/h and covers 456 km in 11h 30m. Although it does not have a stop at Karmelaram or Heelalige, it is often stopped at these stations to allow the passage or arrival of 12677 KSR Bengaluru-Intercity Express, which sometimes experiences delays of up to forty minutes.

== Route and halts ==
The important halts of the train are:

- Yesvantpur Junction
- Banaswadi
- Hosur
- Dharmapuri
- Salem Junction
- Attur
- Chinna Salem
- Vriddhachalam Junction
- Viluppuram Junction
- Puducherry

== Coach composition ==
The train has LHB rakes with a maximum speed of 110 km/h. The train consists of 24 coaches:

- 2 AC II Tier
- 3 AC III Tier
- 12 Sleeper coaches
- 1 Pantry car
- 4 General Unreserved
- 2 Seating cum Luggage Rake

== Traction ==
Both trains are hauled by a Krishnarajapuram Loco Shed-based Wap 7 Electric locomotive from Bangalore to Puducherry and vice versa.

== Rake sharing ==
The train shares its rake with 16505/16506 Gandhidham–Bangalore City Express, 16533/16534 Jodhpur–Bangalore City Express (via Guntakal), 16533/16534 Ajmer–Bangalore City Garib Nawaz Express and 16507/16508 Jodhpur–Bangalore City Express (via Hubballi).

== Direction reversal ==
The train reverses its direction 2 times:

- Vriddhachalam Junction
- Viluppuram Junction

== See also ==
- Yesvantpur Junction railway station
- Puducherry railway station
- Gandhidham–Bangalore City Express
- Bhagat Ki Kothi−Bangalore City Express (via Guntakal)
- Ajmer–Bangalore City Garib Nawaz Express
- Bhagat Ki Kothi−Bangalore City Express (via Hubballi)
- Yesvanthpur Puducherry Garibrath Express
