= Babhangaon Halt railway station =

Railway station in Bihar

General information
- Location: Babhangaon, Deogaon, Katihar district, Bihar; India
- Coordinates: 25°26′54″N 87°48′36″E
- Elevation: 29 m (95 ft)
- System: Passenger train station
- Owner: Indian Railways
- Operator: Northeast Frontier Railway
- Line: Howrah–New Jalpaiguri line
- Platforms: 2
- Tracks: 2

Construction
- Structure type: Standard (on ground station)
- Parking: No

Other information
- Status: Active
- Station code: BAHN
- Zone(s): Northeast Frontier Railway
- Division(s): Katihar

History
- Former names: East Indian Railway Company

Services
Preceding station	Indian Railways	Following station
Khurial towards ?	Eastern Railway zone Howrah–New Jalpaiguri line	Kumedpur Junction towards ?
Location

Babhangaon Halt railway station is a halt railway station on the Howrah–New Jalpaiguri line of Katihar railway division of Northeast Frontier Railway Zone. It is situated at Babhangaon, Deogaon of Katihar district in the Indian state of Bihar.
