= Jama Mosque, Nagpur =

Mosque in Mominpura, Nagpur, India

Jama Masjid
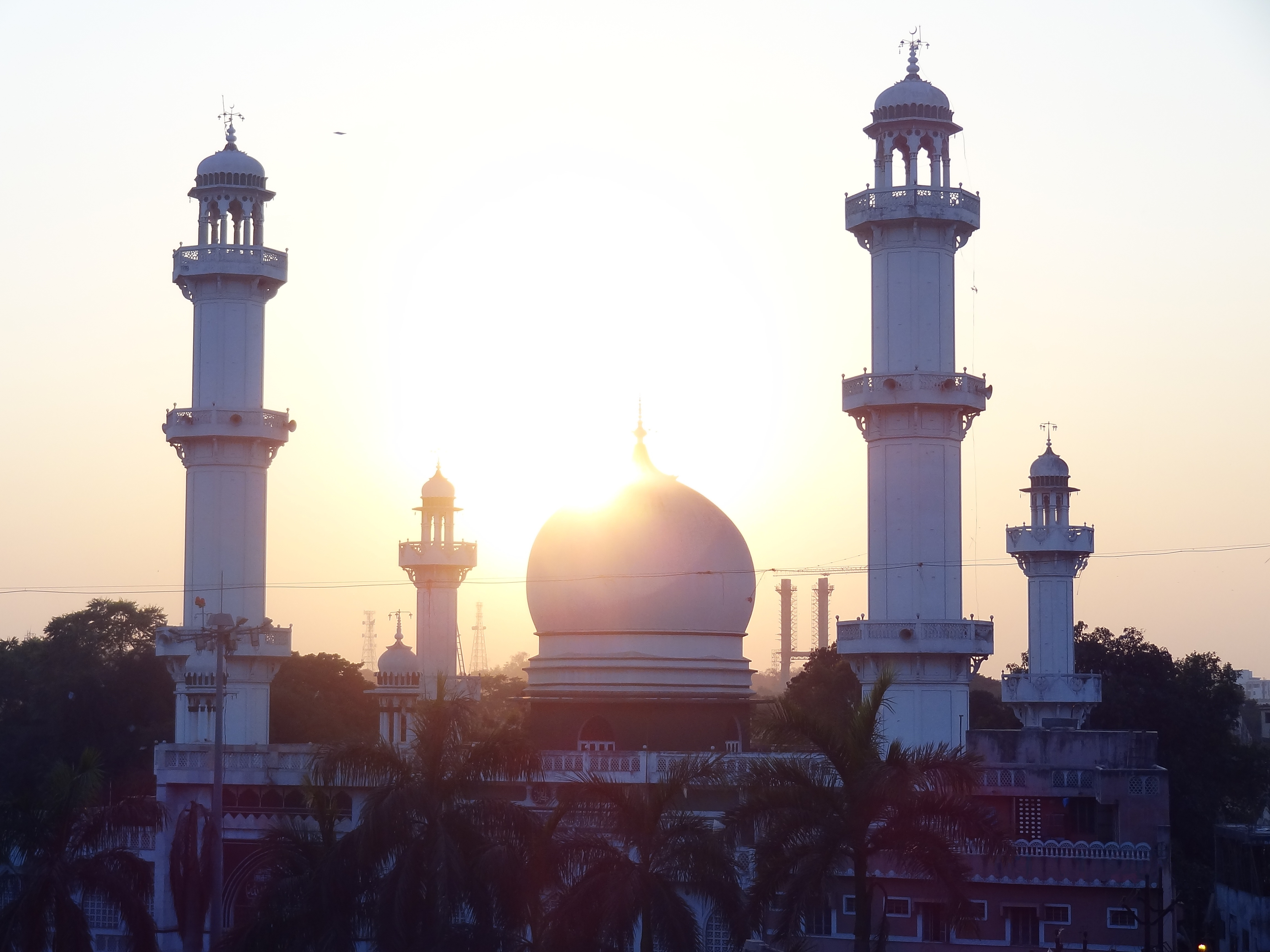
- The mosque, in 2001

- Location of the mosque in Maharashtra

Religion
- Affiliation: Islam
- Ecclesiastical or organizational status: Friday mosque
- Status: Active

Location
- Location: Mominpura, Nagpur, Maharashtra
- Country: India
- Interactive map of Jama Masjid

Architecture
- Type: Mosque architecture
- Style: Indo-Islamic
- Completed: 1960

Specifications
- Capacity: 2,000 worshippers
- Dome: One
- Dome height (outer): 7 m (23 ft)
- Minaret: Four
- Minaret height: 39 m (128 ft); 24 m (80 ft)
- Materials: Concrete

The Jama Masjid is a Friday mosque, located in Mominpura, Nagpur, in the state of Maharashtra, India. The mosque is approximately 1.5 kilometres (0.93 mi) east of Nagpur Railway Station.

The mosque was built in 1960, has four minarets, a garden to the north, and a vehicle parking area to the south. Renovations to the mosque were completed in 2019, following a lightning strike to its 39-metre (128 ft) minarets some time ago.

== See also ==
- Islam in India
- List of mosques in India
