= AZR =

AZR may refer to:

- AZR, the IATA airport code for Touat-Cheikh Sidi Mohamed Belkebir Airport, Adrar, Algeria
- AZR, the Indian Railways station code for Azamnagar Road railway station, Bihar, India
