= Ranchi–Ajmer Garib Nawaz Express =

Train in India

Overview
- Service type: Express
- First service: 18 March 2007; 19 years ago
- Current operator: South Eastern Railway

Route
- Termini: Ranchi Junction (RNC); Ajmer Junction (AII)
- Stops: 37
- Distance travelled: 1,678 km (1,043 mi)
- Average journey time: 33 hours 10 minutes
- Service frequency: Weekly
- Train number: 18631 / 18632

On-board services
- Classes: AC 2 Tier, AC 3 tier, Sleeper Class, General Unreserved
- Seating arrangements: Yes
- Sleeping arrangements: Yes
- Catering facilities: On-board catering, E-catering
- Observation facilities: Large windows
- Baggage facilities: No
- Other facilities: Below the seats

Technical
- Rolling stock: ICF coach
- Track gauge: 1,676 mm (5 ft 6 in)
- Operating speed: 51 km/h (32 mph) average including halts.

The 18631 / 18632 Ranchi–Ajmer Garib Nawaz Express is an express train belonging to South Eastern Railway zone that runs between Ranchi Junction and Ajmer Junction in India. It is currently being operated with 18631/18632 train numbers on a weekly basis.

== Service ==
The 18631/Ranchi–Ajmer Garib Nawaz Express has an average speed of 51 km/h and covers 1678 km in 33h 10m. The 18632/Ajmer–Ranchi Garib Nawaz Express has an average speed of 51 km/h and covers 1678 km in 32h 45m.

== Coach composition ==
The train has standard ICF rakes with a max speed of 110 kmph was hauled by WAP-4 (earlier was WDP-4). The train consists of 15 coaches :

- 1 AC II Tier
- 2 AC III Tier
- 4 Sleeper coaches
- 6 General Unreserved
- 2 Seating cum Luggage Rake

== See also ==
- Ranchi Junction railway station
- Ajmer Junction railway station
- Ajmer–Bangalore City Garib Nawaz Express
- Garib Nawaz Express
