= Teznarayanpur railway station =

Railway station in Katihar, Bihar, India

Teznarayanpur

General information
- Location: Balua Ghatti, Katihar district, Bihar; India
- Coordinates: 25.3393°N 87.7111°E
- Elevation: 28 metres (92 ft)
- System: Indian Railways station
- Platforms: 2
- Tracks: 2

Construction
- Structure type: Standard (on ground station)

Other information
- Status: Functioning
- Station code: TNPR
- Zone(s): Northeast Frontier Railway
- Division(s): Katihar

Services
Preceding station	Indian Railways	Following station
Kantakosh Halt towards Katihar Junction	Barauni–Katihar section Katihar–Teznarayanpur	Terminus
Location
- Location within India Location within Bihar

Teznarayanpur also spelled Tejnarayanpur (station code: TNPR), is a railway terminus on Katihar–Teznarayanpur branch line of Barauni–Katihar section. It is located in Katihar district, Bihar state, India. The station consists of two platforms, which are not well sheltered.

== Location ==
Teznarayanpur railway station serves Balua Ghatti, a medium size village located in Amdabad Block of Katihar district in Bihar. It pertains to Katihar railway division, part of Northeast Frontier Railway zone of Indian Railways.

== Services ==
There are four daily DEMU trains connecting Teznarayanpur with Katihar Junction, covering the distance of 34 km between both stations in 90 minutes:

Number	Train name
75733 / 75734	Katihar–Teznarayanpur DEMU
75735 / 75736	Katihar–Teznarayanpur DEMU
75737 / 75738	Katihar–Teznarayanpur DEMU
75739 / 75740	Katihar–Teznarayanpur DEMU
