= Garib =

Garib may refer to:

- Garib (film), a 1942 Indian film
- Garib Rath Express, an express train on Indian Railways
- Adriano Garib (born 1965), Brazilian actor
- Amir Garib, a 1974 Hindi movie
- Ptolemy-el-Garib, the Arabic name for a philosopher in the Peripatetic school
- A unit of currency in the game Glover

== See also ==
- Gharib (disambiguation)
