= Bangalore City–Ajmer Garib Nawaz Express =

Train in India

KSR Bengaluru – Ajmer Garib Nawaz Express

Overview
- Service type: Express
- Locale: Karnataka, Andhra Pradesh, Maharashtra, Gujarat & Rajasthan
- Current operator: South Western Railway

Route
- Termini: Ajmer Junction (AII); KSR Bengaluru (SBC)
- Stops: 36
- Distance travelled: 2,216 km (1,377 mi)
- Average journey time: 46 hrs 50 mins
- Service frequency: Weekly
- Train number: 16531 / 16532

On-board services
- Classes: AC 2 Tier, AC 3 Tier, Sleeper Class, General Unreserved
- Seating arrangements: Yes
- Sleeping arrangements: Yes
- Catering facilities: Available
- Observation facilities: Large windows
- Baggage facilities: No
- Other facilities: Below the seats

Technical
- Rolling stock: LHB coach
- Track gauge: 1,676 mm (5 ft 6 in)
- Operating speed: 47 km/h (29 mph) average including halts.

The 16531 / 16532 Ajmer–KSR Bengaluru Garib Nawaz Express is an express train belonging to South Western Railway zone that runs between Ajmer Junction and KSR Bengaluru in India. It is currently being operated with 16531/16532 train numbers on a weekly basis.

== Service ==
- 16531 Ajmer–KSR Bengaluru Garib Nawaz Express has an average speed of 47 km/h and covers 2216 km in 47 hrs 15 mins.
- The 16532 KSR Bengaluru–Ajmer Garib Nawaz Express has an average speed of 46 km/h and covers 2216 km in 48 hrs 40 mins.

== Route and halts ==
The important halts of the train are:

- Ajmer Junction
- Marwar Junction
- Abu Road
- Palanpur Junction
- Mahesana Junction
- Ahmedabad Junction
- Nadiad Junction
- Anand Junction
- Vadodara Junction
- Surat
- Valsad
- Vapi
- Vasai Road
- Bhiwandi Road
- Kalyan Junction
- Karjat
- Lonavala
- Pune Junction
- Satara
- Miraj Junction
- Belagavi
- Londa Junction
- Dharwad
- Hubballi Junction
- Gadag Junction
- Hosapete Junction
- Ballari Junction
- Guntakal Junction
- Dharmavaram Junction
- Yesvantpur Junction
- KSR Bengaluru

== Coach composition ==
The train has LHB rakes with a max speed of 130 kmph. The train consists of 21 coaches:

- 1 AC First Class
- 2 AC II Tier
- 4 AC III Tier
- 7 Sleeper coaches
- 1 Pantry car
- 4 General Unreserved
- 2 Seating cum Luggage Rake

== Schedule ==
Train number	Station code	Departure station	Departure time	Departure day	Arrival station	Arrival time	Arrival day
16531	AII	Ajmer Junction	05:30 am	Mon	KSR Bengaluru City Junction	04:45 am	Wed
16532	SBC	KSR Bengaluru City Junction	17:00 pm	Fri	Ajmer Junction	17:40 pm	Sun

== Traction ==
Earlier the train was hauled by a Krishnarajapuram Loco Shed-based WDP-4 diesel locomotive. Now both trains are hauled by a Krishnarajapuram Loco Shed-based WAP-7 electric locomotive from Ajmer to Bengaluru and vice versa.

== Rake sharing ==
The train shares its rake with,

- 16573/16574 Yesvantpur–Puducherry Weekly Express,
- 16533/16534 Jodhpur–Bangalore City Express (via Guntakal),
- 16505/16506 Gandhidham–Bangalore City Express
- 16507/16508 Jodhpur–Bangalore City Express (via Hubballi).

== See also ==
- Bangalore City railway station
- Gandhidham Junction railway station
- Yesvantpur–Puducherry Weekly Express
- Bhagat Ki Kothi−Bangalore City Express (via Guntakal)
- Gandhidham–Bangalore City Express
- Bhagat Ki Kothi−Bangalore City Express (via Hubballi)
