= Kamalpur Halt railway station =

Railway station in Bihar, India

General information
- Location: Kamalpur, Katihar district, Bihar; India
- Coordinates: 25°31′06″N 87°50′15″E
- Elevation: 33 m (108 ft)
- System: Passenger train station
- Owner: Indian Railways
- Operator: Northeast Frontier Railway
- Line: Howrah–New Jalpaiguri line
- Platforms: 2
- Tracks: 2

Construction
- Structure type: Standard (on ground station)
- Parking: No

Other information
- Status: Active
- Station code: KMPH
- Zone(s): Northeast Frontier Railway
- Division(s): Katihar

History
- Former names: East Indian Railway Company

Services
Preceding station	Indian Railways	Following station
Azamnagar Road towards ?	Eastern Railway zone Howrah–New Jalpaiguri line	Khurial towards ?
Location

Kamalpur Halt railway station (station code: KMPH), is a halt railway station on the Howrah–New Jalpaiguri line of Katihar railway division of Northeast Frontier Railway zone. It is situated at Kamalpur of Katihar district in the Indian state of Bihar. Six passenger trains stop at Kamalpur Halt railway station.
