= KSR Bangalore–Jodhpur Express (via Davangere) =

Train in India

Jodhpur–KSR Bengaluru Express
Overview
- Service type: Express
- Locale: Karnataka, Maharashtra, Gujarat & Rajasthan
- Current operator: South Western Railway

Route
- Termini: Jodhpur Junction (JU); KSR Bengaluru (SBC)
- Stops: 44
- Distance travelled: 2,109.6 km (1,311 mi)
- Average journey time: 44 hours 35 mins
- Service frequency: Bi-weekly
- Train number: 16507 / 16508

On-board services
- Classes: AC 1 tier, AC 2 tier, AC 3 tier, Sleeper class, General Unreserved
- Seating arrangements: Yes
- Sleeping arrangements: Yes
- Catering facilities: Pantry car, E-catering, On-board catering
- Observation facilities: Large windows

Technical
- Rolling stock: LHB coach
- Track gauge: 1,676 mm (5 ft 6 in)
- Operating speed: 46 km/h (29 mph) average with halts

The 16507 / 16508 Jodhpur–KSR Bengaluru Express is an Express train belonging to Indian Railways South Western Railway zone that runs between Jodhpur Junction and KSR Bengaluru in India.

It operates as train number 16507 from Jodhpur Junction to KSR Bengaluru and as train number 16508 in the reverse direction, serving the states of Rajasthan, Gujarat, Maharashtra and Karnataka.

== Coaches ==
The train has standard ICF rakes with a maximum speed of 130 km/h. The train consists of 26 coaches:

- 1 AC First Class
- 3 AC II Tier
- 4 AC III Tier
- 11 Sleeper coaches
- 1 Pantry car
- 4 General Unreserved
- 2 Seating cum Luggage Rake

As is customary with most train services in India, coach composition may be amended at the discretion of Indian Railways depending on demand.

== Service ==
- The 16507/Jodhpur–Ksr Bengaluru Express covers the distance of 2,109.6 km (1,311 mi) in 46 hours 05 mins (46 km/h).
- The 16508/KSR Bengaluru–Jodhpur Express covers the distance of 2,109.6 km (1,311 mi) in 43 hours 00 mins (49 km/h).

As the average speed of the train is lower than 55 km/h (34 mph), as per railway rules, its fare doesn't includes a Superfast surcharge.

== Routing ==
The 16507/08 Jodhpur– KSR Bengaluru Express runs from Jodhpur Junction via Luni Junction, Marwar Junction, Ahmedabad Junction, Vadodara Junction, Surat, Vasai Road, Kalyan Junction, Pune Junction, Belagavi, Hubballi Junction, Arsikere Junction, Yesvantpur Junction to KSR Bengaluru.

== Schedule ==
Train number	Station code	Departure station	Departure time	Departure day	Arrival station	Arrival time	Arrival day
16507	JU	Jodhpur Junction	05:10 AM	Thu, Sat	KSR Bengaluru	03:15 AM	Sat, Mon
16508	SBC	KSR Bengaluru	21:50 PM	Mon, Wed	Jodhpur Junction	16:50 PM	Wed, Fri

== Rake sharing ==
The train shares its rake with;

- 16573/16574 Yesvantpur–Puducherry Weekly Express,
- 16533/16534 Jodhpur–KSR Bengaluru Express (via Guntakal),
- 16505/16506 Gandhidham–Bangalore City Express,
- 16531/16532 Ajmer–KSR Bengaluru Garib Nawaz Express.

== Traction ==
early ago was WDM-3D. As the route is fully electrified, a Krishnarajapuram Loco Shed-based WAP-7 electric locomotive pulls the train to its destination.
