= Yesvantpur–Puducherry Garib Rath Express =

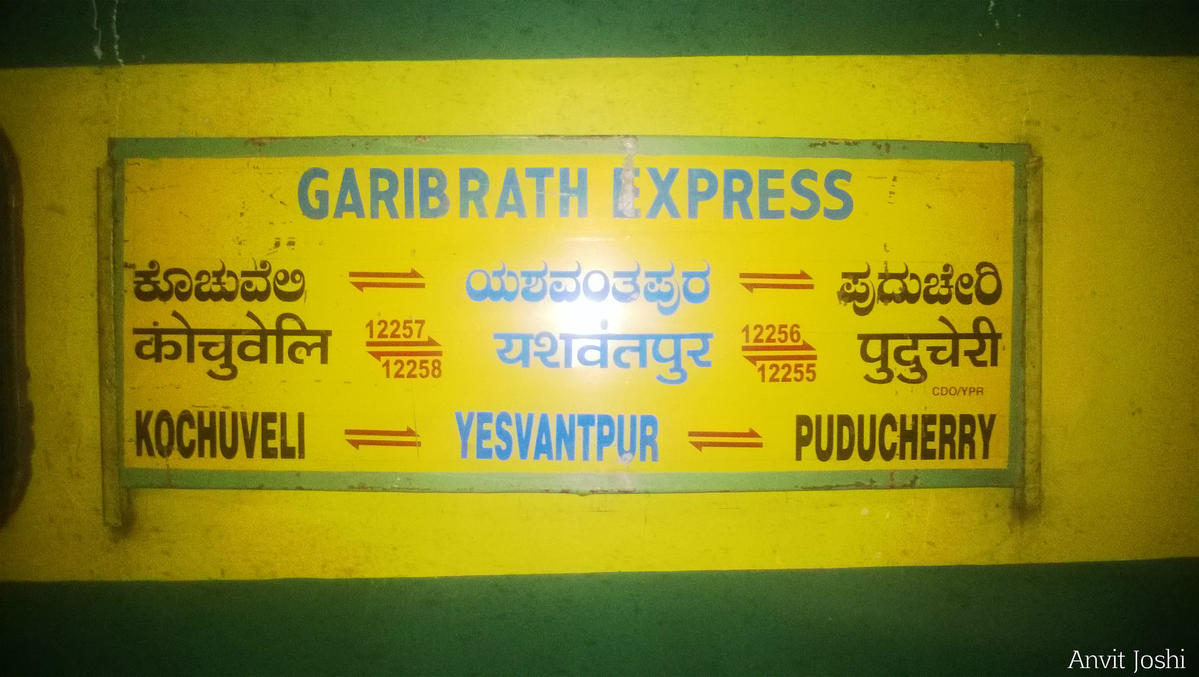
- Yesvantpur–Puducherry Garib Rath Express name board

Overview
- Service type: Express
- Locale: Karnataka; Tamil Nadu; Puducherry
- First service: 03/01/2009
- Last service: 14/03/2014
- Current operator(s): South Western Railway

Route
- Termini: Yeshvantpur railway station Puducherry railway station
- Stops: 9
- Distance travelled: 456 km (283 mi)
- Average journey time: 10 hours 50 minutes
- Service frequency: Weekly
- Train number(s): 12255/12256

On-board services
- Class(es): AC 2Tier, AC 3Tier, Sleeper
- Seating arrangements: Yes
- Sleeping arrangements: Yes

Technical
- Track gauge: 1,676 mm (5 ft 6 in)
- Operating speed: 46 km/h (29 mph) average with halts

The Yesvantpur–Puducherry Garib Rath Express was a Garib Rath Express train that ran between Bangalore Yeshvantapur railway station and Puducherry. It was the first train service from Bangalore to Puducherry. Following poor response, this train was cancelled and converted to an ordinary train with effect from 18 March 2014.

== Service ==
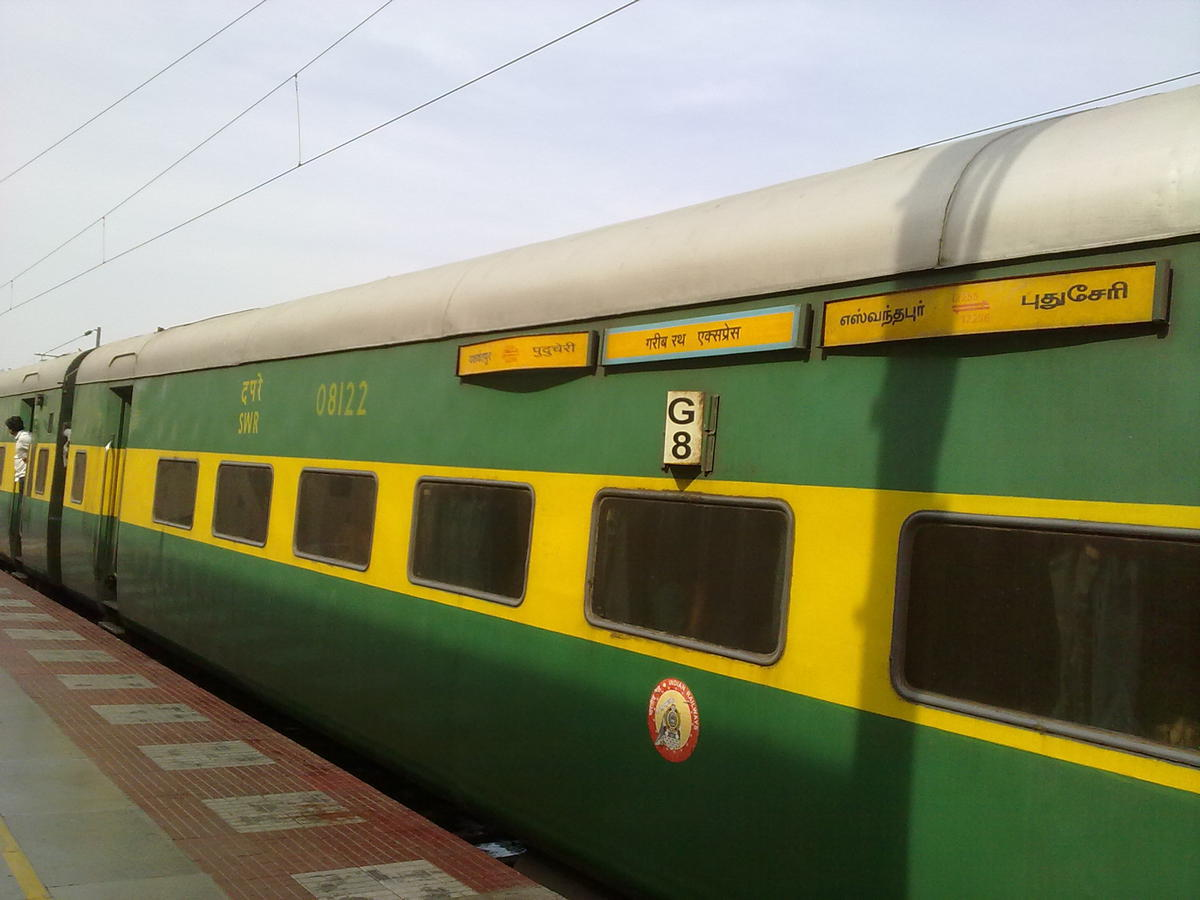
Puducherry Garib Rath Express board

It was initially started out as a Garib Rath Express. The 12255/12256 Yesvantpur Puducherry Garib Rath Express was a weekly service. It operates as train number 12255 from Yesvantpur to Puducherry and as train number 12256 in the reverse direction. It covers a distance of 456 kilometres in each direction, however it takes 10 hours 5 mins when operating as train number 2255 at an average speed of 60 km/h (excluding halts), while its return journey as train number 12256 takes 10 hrs 20 mins at an average speed of 55 km/h (excluding halts).

Due to poor patronage, the Garib Rath train was cancelled and an ordinary express started. The rake of the Garib Rath was used to make the Kochuveli Yesvantpur Garib Rath Express into a tri-weekly. The ordinary weekly express now leaves Yesvantpur as train number 16573 on Friday at 2100 hrs and arrives at Puducherry the next day at 0750 hrs covering 456 km at 10 hours and 50 minutes. Train number 16574 leaves Puducherry on Saturday at 2100 hours arriving at Yesvantpur the next day at 0820hrs taking 11 hours and 20 minutes for the journey.

== Time Table ==
16573 – Yesvantpur to Puducherry

| Station Code | Station Name | Arrival | Departure |
|---|---|---|---|
| YPR | Yesvantpur | Starting Station | 21:00 |
| BAND | Banaswadi | 21:25 | 21:27 |
| HSRA | Hosur | 22:08 | 22:10 |
| DPJ | Dharmapuri | 23:33 | 23:35 |
| SA | Salem Junction | 01:15 | 01:20 |
| ATU | Attur | 02:24 | 02:25 |
| CHSM | Chinna Salem | 02:53 | 02:55 |
| VRI | Vriddhachalam Junction | 04:20 | 04:30 |
| VM | Viluppuram Junction | 06:25 | 06:40 |
| PDY | Puducherry railway station | 07:50 | Destination Station |

16574 – Puducherry to Yesvantpur

| Station Code | Station Name | Arrival | Departure |
|---|---|---|---|
| PDY | Puducherry railway station | Starting Station | 21:00 |
| VM | Viluppuram Junction | 21:40 | 21:50 |
| VRI | Vriddhachalam Junction | 22:45 | 22:55 |
| CHSM | Chinna Salem | 00:10 | 00:12 |
| ATU | Attur | 00:28 | 00:30 |
| SA | Salem Junction | 02:20 | 02:25 |
| DPJ | Dharmapuri | 04:13 | 04:15 |
| HSRA | Hosur | 05:58 | 06:00 |
| BAND | Banaswadi | 06:58 | 07:00 |
| YPR | Yesvantpur | 08:20 | Destination Station |

== Coach composition ==
It is a 22 coach train having Sleeper, 3AC and 2AC accommodations. The train has a rake-sharing agreement with the 16533/16534 Bhagat ki Kothi- Bangalore City Weekly express.

== Locomotion ==
The train is hauled using diesel engines all the way from Yeswanthpur to Puducherry, with one locomotive reversal at Vriddhachalam and another at Viluppuram. The process of reversal takes around 45 minutes at each of these railway stations.

== See also ==
- Yesvantpur Junction railway station
- Puducherry railway station
- Yesvantpur–Puducherry Weekly Express
