= Kishanganj–Ajmer Garib Nawaz Express =

Train in India

Kishangang-Ajmer Garib Nawaz Express

Overview
- Service type: Express
- Locale: West Bengal, Bihar, Uttar Pradesh, Delhi, Haryana & Rajasthan
- First service: 30 July 2006; 20 years ago
- Current operator: Northeast Frontier Railways (NFR)

Route
- Termini: Kishanganj (KNE); Ajmer (AII)
- Stops: 28
- Distance travelled: 1,839 km (1,143 mi)
- Average journey time: 39 hours 25 mins
- Service frequency: Tri-Weekly
- Train number: 15715 / 15716

On-board services
- Classes: AC 2 Tier, AC 3 Tier, Sleeper Class, General Unreserved
- Seating arrangements: Yes
- Sleeping arrangements: Yes
- Catering facilities: On-board catering, E-catering
- Observation facilities: Large windows
- Baggage facilities: Available
- Other facilities: Below the seats

Technical
- Rolling stock: LHB coach
- Track gauge: 1,676 mm (5 ft 6 in)
- Operating speed: 54 km/h (34 mph) average including halts.

The 15715 / 15716 Kishanganj–Ajmer Garib Nawaz Express is an express train belonging to Northeast Frontier Railway zone that runs between the city of Kishanganj of Bihar and Ajmer Junction of Rajasthan in India.

== Service ==
This is a direct train between Kishanganj and Ajmer. This is train connects the Eastern and Northern parts of India covering Bihar, Uttar Pradesh and Rajasthan.

== Route & halts ==
- Kishanganj
- Dalkhola
- Barsoi Junction
- Azamnagar Road
- Katihar
- Barauni
- Chhapra Junction
- Ballia
- Azamgarh
- Ayodhya Cantt.
- Lucknow Charbagh
- Bareilly
- Moradabad
- Delhi Junction
- Gurgaon
- Alwar
- Jaipur
- Ajmer Junction

== Traction ==
It is hauled by a Ghaziabad Loco Shed based WAP-7 electric locomotive on its entire journey.

== See also ==
- Ajmer Junction railway station
- Kishanganj railway station
- New Jalpaiguri – Sitamarhi Weekly Express
- Paharia Express
- Ajmer – Bangalore City Garib Nawaz Express
