= Nawazish =

Nawazish (Persian: نوازش) is a Persian name meaning "courtesy". Notable people with the name include:

- Nawazish Muhammad Khan (died 1755), former Naib Nazim of Dhaka
- Nawajesh Ahmed (1916–2000), Bangladeshi politician
- Noazesh Ahmed (1935–2009), Bangladeshi geneticist and photographer
- Nawazesh Uddin (1945–1981), Bangladeshi army officer
- Nawazish Alam Khan (born 1979), Indian politician
- Nawazish Ali Khan, Bangladeshi television producer
- Ali Moeen Nawazish (born 1990), Pakistani columnist

== See also ==
- Nawaz
