= Dalan railway station =

Railway station in Katihar, Bihar, India

Coordinates: 25.6030°N 87.5630°E

Dalan

General information
- Location: Dalan, Katihar, Bihar; India
- Elevation: 28 metres (92 ft)
- System: Indian Railways station
- Line: Jogbani–Katihar line
- Platforms: 2
- Tracks: 2

Construction
- Structure type: Standard (on-ground station)

Other information
- Status: Functioning
- Station code: DLF
- Fare zone: Northeast Frontier Railway
Location
- Location within India Location within Bihar

Dalan railway station is a railway station on the Jogbani–Katihar line. It is located in Katihar district in the Indian state of Bihar. The station consists of two platforms.
