= Khurial railway station =

Railway station in Bihar, India

General information
- Location: Sihpur, Khurial, Katihar district, Bihar; India
- Coordinates: 25°29′28″N 87°49′37″E
- Elevation: 33 m (108 ft)
- System: Passenger train station
- Owner: Indian Railways
- Operator: Northeast Frontier Railway
- Line: Howrah–New Jalpaiguri line
- Platforms: 2
- Tracks: 2

Construction
- Structure type: Standard (on ground station)
- Parking: No

Other information
- Status: Active
- Station code: KWE
- Zone(s): Northeast Frontier Railway
- Division(s): Katihar

History
- Former names: East Indian Railway Company

Services
Preceding station	Indian Railways	Following station
Kamalpur Halt towards ?	Eastern Railway zone Howrah–New Jalpaiguri line	Babhabgaon towards ?
Location

Khurial railway station (station code: KWE), is a railway station on the Howrah–New Jalpaiguri line of Katihar railway division of Northeast Frontier Railway zone. It is situated at Sihpur, Khurial of Katihar district in the Indian state of Bihar.
