= Sanjay Gram railway station =

Railway station in Bihar

General information
- Location: Kanaila, Wankar, Sanjay Gram, Katihar district, Bihar; India
- Coordinates: 25°42′22″N 87°53′25″E
- Elevation: 34 m (112 ft)
- System: Passenger train station
- Owner: Indian Railways
- Operator: Northeast Frontier Railway
- Line: Howrah–New Jalpaiguri line
- Platforms: 2
- Tracks: 2

Construction
- Structure type: Standard (on ground station)

Other information
- Status: Active
- Station code: SJGM
- Zone(s): Northeast Frontier Railway
- Division(s): Katihar

History
- Former names: East Indian Railway Company

Services
Preceding station	Indian Railways	Following station
Sudhani towards ?	Eastern Railway zone Howrah–New Jalpaiguri line	Barsoi Junction towards ?
Location

Sanjay Gram railway station (station code: SJGM), is a railway station on Katihar–Siliguri branch of Howrah–New Jalpaiguri line in the Katihar railway division of Northeast Frontier Railway zone. It is situated at Kanaila, Wankar, Sanjay Gram of Katihar district in the Indian state of Bihar.
