= Mukuria railway station =

Railway station in Bihar

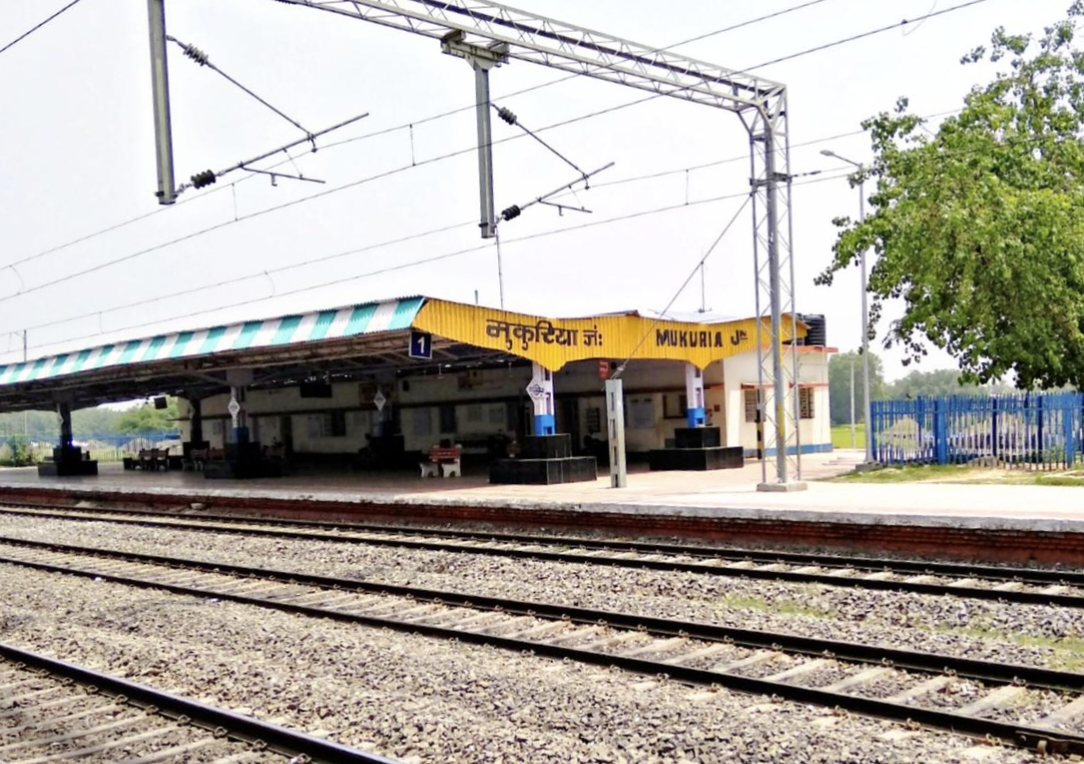

General information
- Location: Mukuria, Katihar district, Bihar; India
- Coordinates: 25°37′45″N 87°53′14″E
- Elevation: 34 m (112 ft)
- System: Passenger train station
- Owner: Indian Railways
- Operator: Northeast Frontier Railway
- Line: Howrah–New Jalpaiguri line
- Platforms: 2
- Tracks: 2

Construction
- Structure type: Standard (on ground station)

Other information
- Status: Active
- Station code: MFA
- Zone(s): Northeast Frontier Railway
- Division(s): Katihar

History
- Former names: East Indian Railway Company

Services
Preceding station	Indian Railways	Following station
Barsoi Junction towards ?	Eastern Railway zone Howrah–New Jalpaiguri line	Bhawanipur Bihar towards ?
Location

Mukuria railway station (station code: MFA), is a railway station on the Howrah–New Jalpaiguri line of Katihar railway division of Northeast Frontier Railway zone. It is situated at Mukuria of Katihar district in the Indian state of Bihar.
