= Telta railway station =

Railway station in Bihar, India

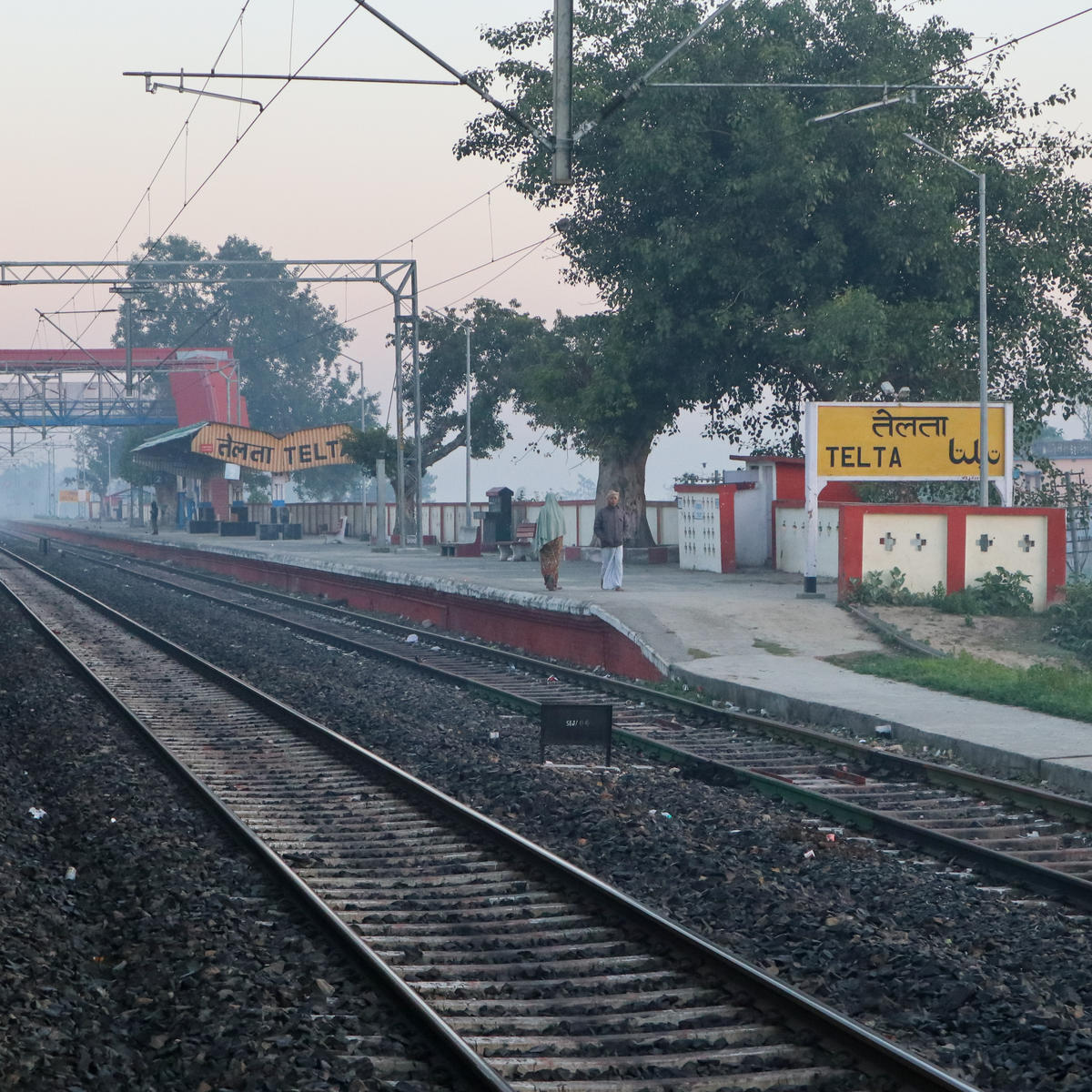

General information
- Location: State Highway 65, Rupauli, Telta, Katihar district, Bihar; India
- Coordinates: 25°48′24″N 87°50′32″E
- Elevation: 40 m (130 ft)
- System: Passenger train station
- Owner: Indian Railways
- Operator: Northeast Frontier Railway
- Line: Howrah–New Jalpaiguri line
- Platforms: 2
- Tracks: 2

Construction
- Structure type: Standard (on ground station)

Other information
- Status: Active
- Station code: TETA
- Zone(s): Northeast Frontier Railway
- Division(s): Katihar

History
- Former names: East Indian Railway Company

Services
Preceding station	Indian Railways	Following station
Dalkhola towards ?	Eastern Railway zone Howrah–New Jalpaiguri line	Ajharail towards ?
Location

Telta railway station (station code: TETA), is a railway station on Katihar–Siliguri branch of Howrah–New Jalpaiguri line in the Katihar railway division of Northeast Frontier Railway zone. It is situated beside State Highway 65 at Rupauli, Telta of Katihar district in the Indian state of Bihar.
