= Sudhani railway station =

Railway station in Katihar, India

General information
- Location: State Highway 65, Malaur, Katihar district, Bihar; India
- Coordinates: 25°43′40″N 87°52′46″E
- Elevation: 38 m (125 ft)
- System: Passenger train station
- Owner: Indian Railways
- Operator: Northeast Frontier Railway
- Line: Howrah–New Jalpaiguri line
- Platforms: 2
- Tracks: 2

Construction
- Structure type: At grade

Other information
- Status: Active
- Station code: SUD
- Zone(s): Northeast Frontier Railway zone
- Division(s): Katihar

History
- Former names: East Indian Railway Company

Services
Preceding station	Indian Railways	Following station
Ajharail towards ?	Eastern Railway zone Howrah–New Jalpaiguri line	Sanjay Gram towards ?
Location

Sudhani railway station (station code: SUD), is a railway station on Katihar–Siliguri branch of Howrah–New Jalpaiguri line in the Katihar railway division of Northeast Frontier Railway zone. It is situated beside State Highway 65 at Malaur of Katihar district in the Indian state of Bihar. Total 16 trains stop at Sudhani railway station.
