= Bhawanipur Bihar railway station =

Railway station in Bihar, India

General information
- Location: Bhawanipur, Katihar district, Bihar; India
- Coordinates: 25°35′41″N 87°52′04″E
- Elevation: 37 m (121 ft)
- System: Passenger train station
- Owner: Indian Railways
- Operator: Northeast Frontier Railway
- Line: Howrah–New Jalpaiguri line
- Platforms: 2
- Tracks: 2

Construction
- Structure type: Standard (on ground station)
- Parking: No

Other information
- Status: Active
- Station code: BWPB
- Zone(s): Northeast Frontier Railway
- Division(s): Katihar

History
- Former names: East Indian Railway Company

Services
| Preceding station | Indian Railways | Following station |
|---|---|---|
| Mukuria towards ? | Eastern Railway zone Howrah–New Jalpaiguri line | Azamnagar Road towards ? |
Location

Bhawanipur Bihar railway station is a railway station on the Howrah–New Jalpaiguri line of Katihar railway division of Northeast Frontier Railway zone. It is situated at Bhawanipur of Katihar district in the Indian state of Bihar. Number of passengers trains stop at Bhawanipur Bihar railway station.
