= Gharib Nawaz Masjid =

Mosque in Nagpur, Maharashtra, India

- गरीब नवाज मशीद
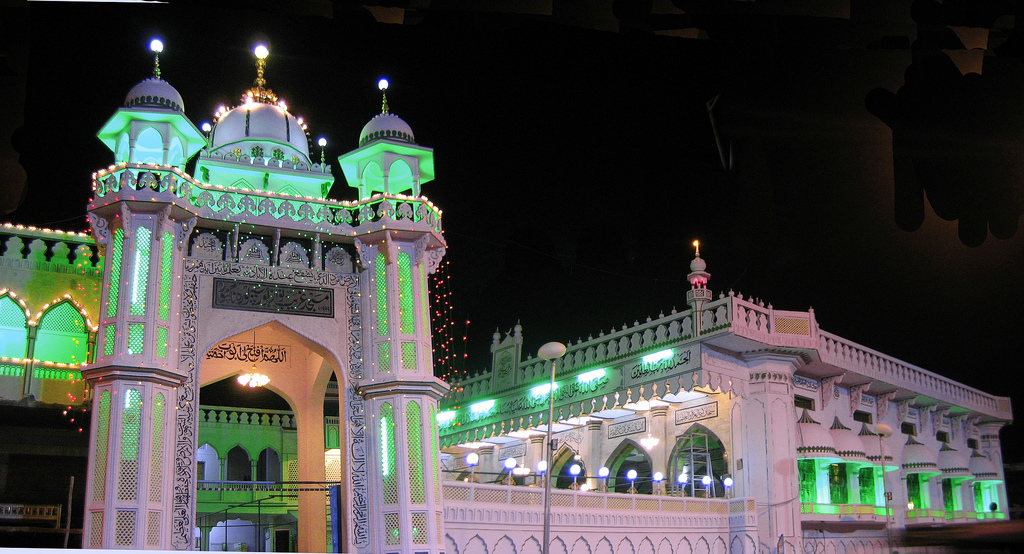
- The mosque at night, in 2011

- Location of the mosque in Maharashtra

Religion
- Affiliation: Sunni Islam
- Sect: Sufi Barelvi movement
- Ecclesiastical or organizational status: Mosque
- Status: Active

Location
- Location: Mominpura, Nagpur, Maharashtra
- Country: India
- Interactive map of Gharib Nawaz Masjid
- Coordinates: 21°05′34″N 79°03′15″E

Architecture
- Architects: Mohammad Ayyub Ansari Noori; Tariq Ansari Noori
- Type: Mosque architecture
- Style: Modern Indo-Islamic
- Completed: 1999

Specifications
- Capacity: 1,500 worshippers
- Dome: One
- Dome height (outer): 5 m (16 ft)
- Minarets: Two (under construction)
- Minaret height: 24 m (80 ft)
- Materials: Concrete; marble; glass; metals

The Gharib Nawaz Masjid (Marathi: गरीब नवाज मशीद), also known as the Gharib Nawaz Mosque, is a Sufi mosque affiliated with the Barelvi movement, located in the Mominpura area of Nagpur, in the state of Maharashtra, India. The mosque was named after Khwaja Moinuddin Chishti, a Sufi saint. The dome of the mosque is similar to the Shrine of Khwaja Gharib Nawaz.

== Architecture ==
The mosque was completed in 1999 in a modern version of Indo-Islamic architecture. The walls of the mosque and its twenty-seven arches are covered with marble. There are calligraphic verses derived from the Quran on every arch. The ornamentation on the walls includes the names of four khalifahs and Ahl Al Bait.

== Visits ==
Mohammad Ilyas Attar Qadri, the leader of Dawat-e-Islami, and Muhammad Owais Raza Qadri, the Naat Khawan, both visited the mosque in 1997. In 2004, Mohammad Imran Attar visited the mosque. Sheikh Al Islam Madani Miyan, Sayyad Hashmi Miyan, and other Muslim scholars have also visited the mosque.

== Gallery ==
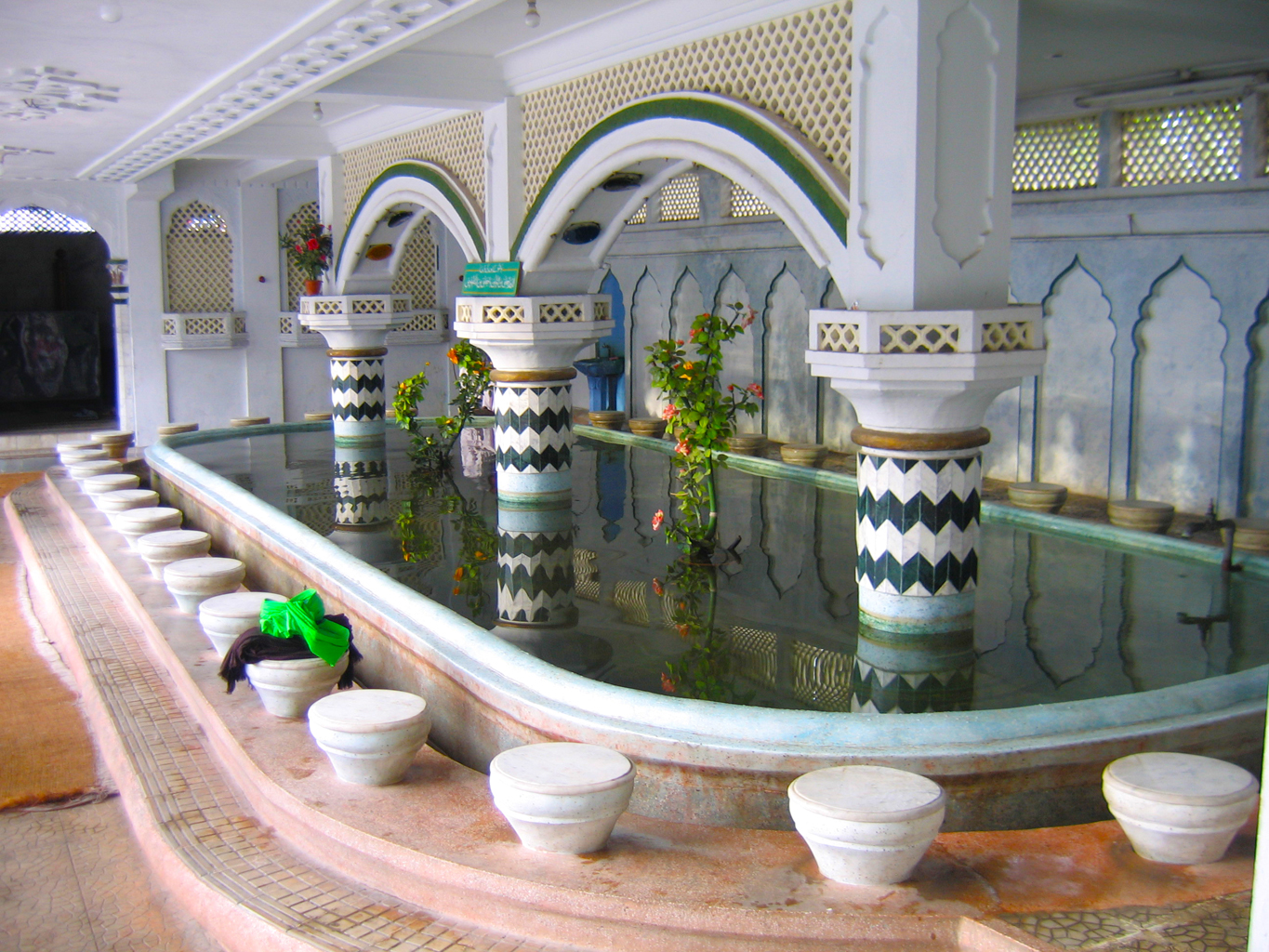
Wuzu khana

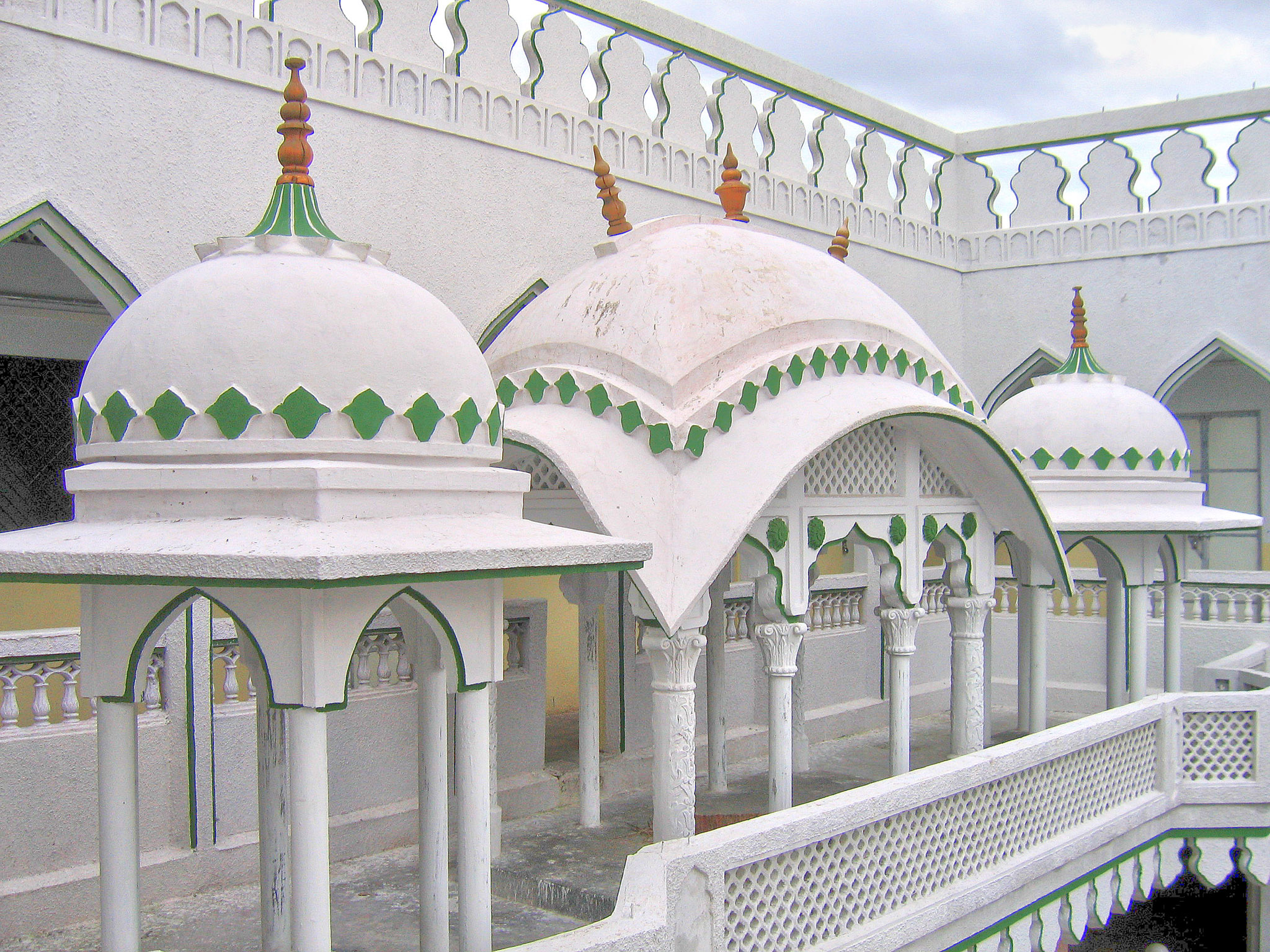
Upper portion

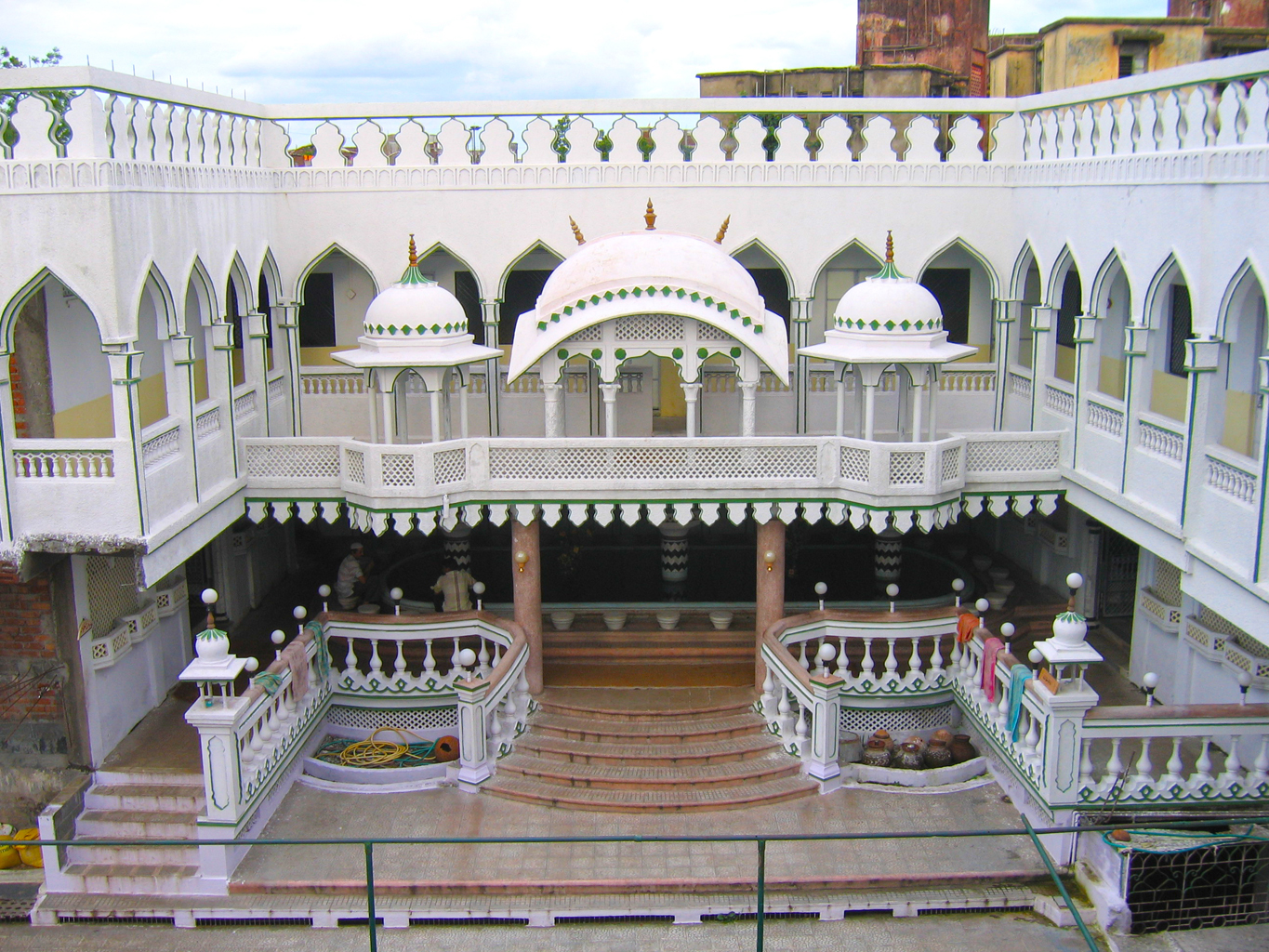
Wuzu khana

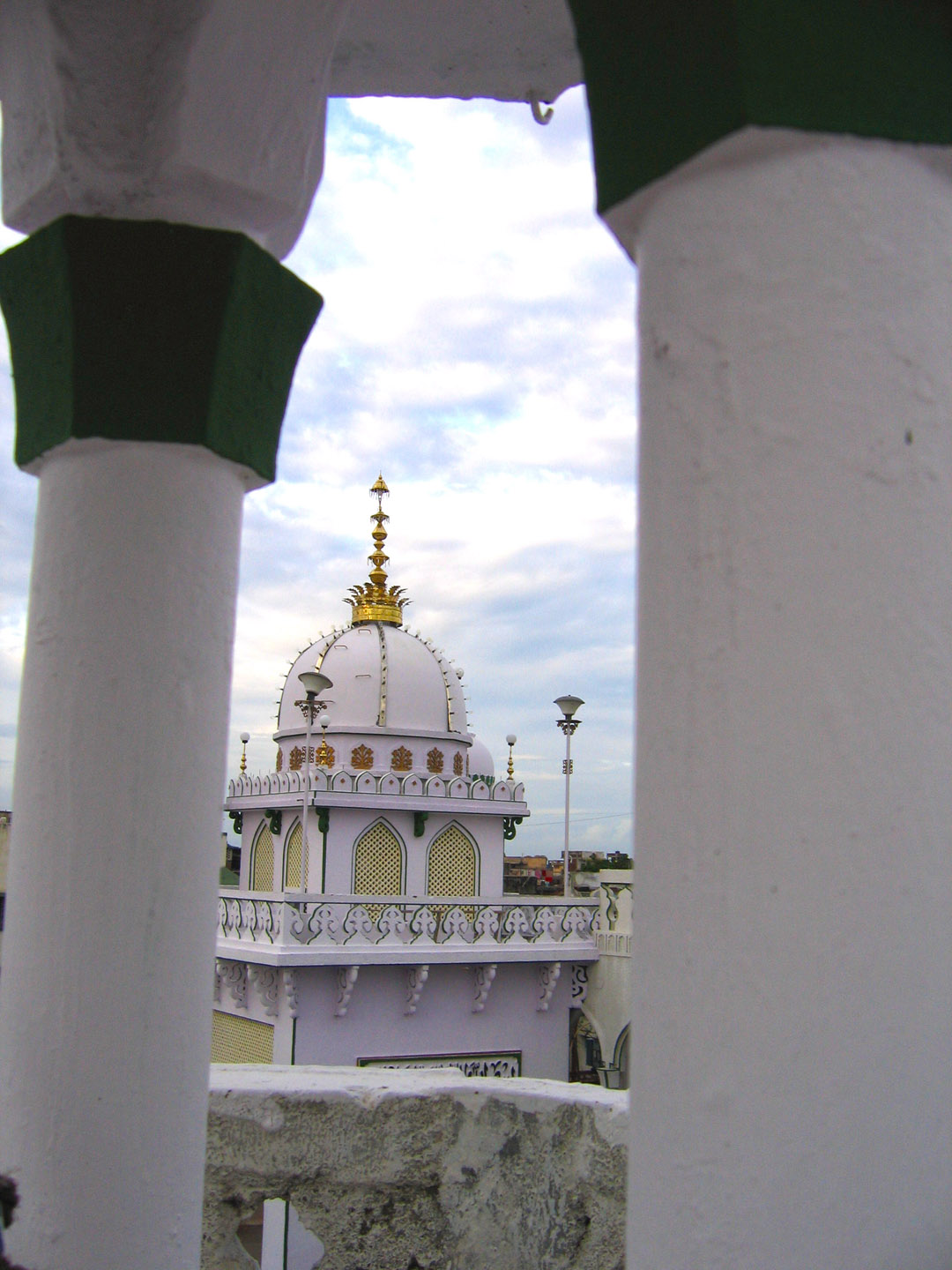
View of dome

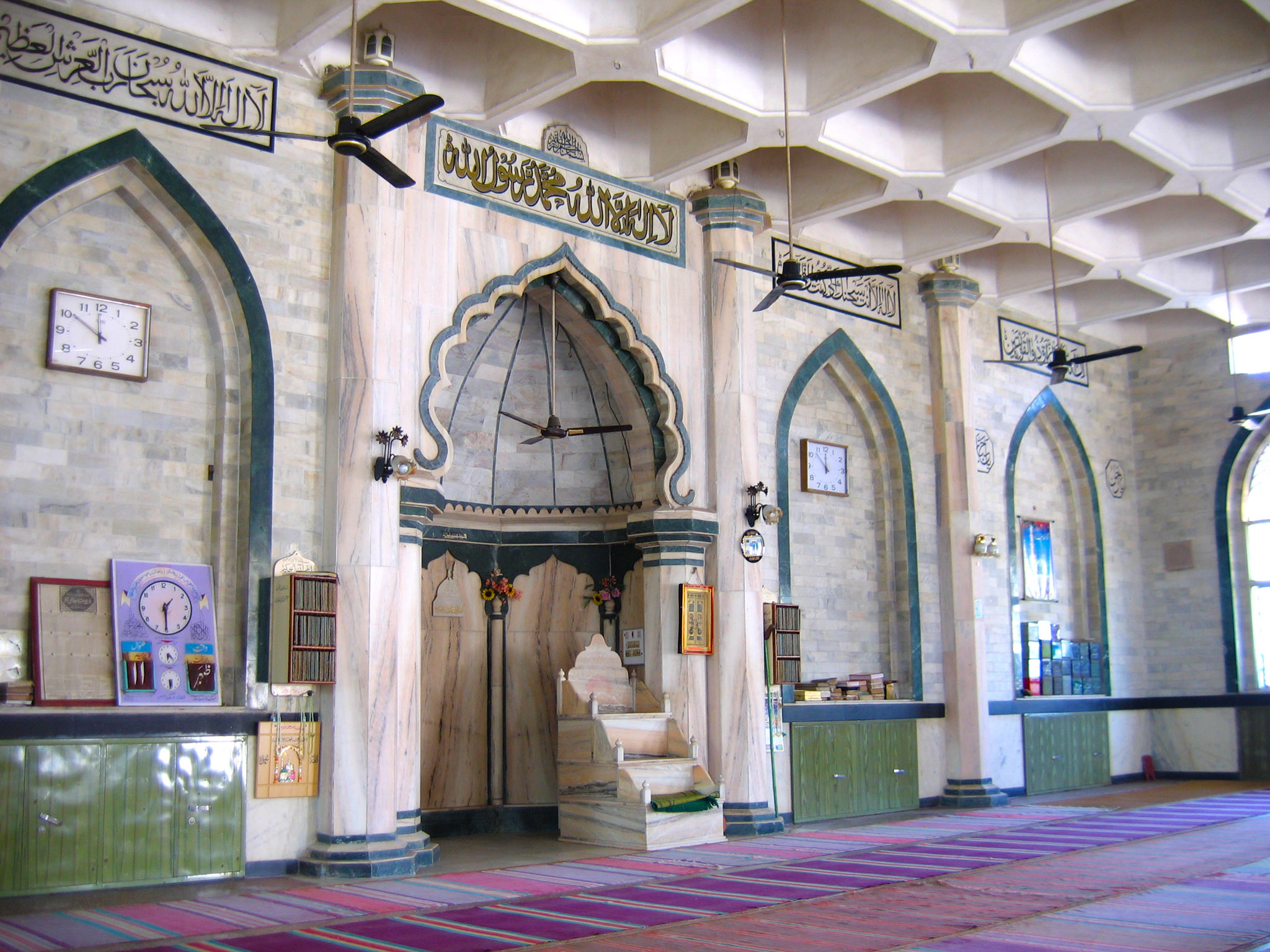
Minbar

== See also ==
- Islam in India
- List of mosques in India
