= Gharib Asqalani =

Palestinian writer and novelist

- غريب عسقلاني
- Born: Ibrahim Abdul Jabbar Al-Zant; 4 April 1948 al-Majdal
- Died: 21 June 2022 (aged 74); Gaza City
- Occupation(s): Writer and novelist

Gharib Asqalani (Arabic: غريب عسقلاني, romanized: Gharĭb ʹAsqalānī; 4 April 1948 – 21 June 2022) was a Palestinian writer and novelist. His real name was Ibrahim Abdul Jabbar Al-Zant (Arabic: إبراهيم عبد الجبار الزنط, romanized: Ibrāhīm ʻAbd al-Jabbār alznṭ). He served as president of the Union for Palestinian Writers from 1987 to 2005, and contributed to the Encyclopedia of Modern Palestinian Literature published by the Project of Translation from Arabic (PROTA).

He chose his pen name Gharib Asqalani because he was born in the city of al-Majdal (Ascalon), so he is Asqalani, and he is Gharib (means foreigner) because he was displaced with his family during the 1948 Palestine war.

== Biography ==
Asqalani was born in al-Majdal on 4 April 1948, from he was displaced with his family during the 1948 Palestine war, to Al-Shati refugee camp, Gaza City. He was educated at Assiut University and Alexandria University, where he was awarded a Bachelor of Agricultural economics in 1969. He awarded the Short Story Prize from Bethlehem University in 1977 and the Short Story Prize from the Union for Palestinian Writers. Also, he was awarded the Order of Palestine for Culture, Science and Arts by Mahmoud Abbas, the president of Palestine , in 2016.

He died in Gaza City on 21 June 2022.

== Works ==
He published more than 10 novels, including:

- al-Ṭawq (Arabic: الطوق), 1979
- Zaman alāntbāh (Arabic: زمن الانتباه), 1996
- Najmah al-Nawātī (Arabic: نجمة النواتي), 1999
- Jafāf al-ḥalaq (Arabic: جفاف الحلق), 1999
- zaman Daḥmūs al-aghbar (Arabic: زمن دحموس الأغبر), 2001
- Layālī al-ashhur al-qamarīyah (Arabic: ليالي الأشهر القمرية), 2001
- ʻAwdah Manṣūr al-Laddāwī (Arabic: عودة منصور اللداوي), 2002
- Azminah bayḍāʼ (Arabic: أزمنة بيضاء), 2005
- Ḍifāf al-bawḥ (Arabic: ضفاف البوح), 2006
- al-Amīrah al-Bayḍāʼ (Arabic: الأميرة البيضاء), 2007
- Awlād mzywnh (Arabic: أولاد مزيونة), 2009
- Hal raʼaytu ẓill mawtī (Arabic: هل رأيت ظل موتي), 2011
- al-Mansī (Arabic: المنسي), 2016

His short stories have been translated into English, French, Spanish and Russian.
