= Amir al-Arabi Ali Gharib =

Libyan diplomat

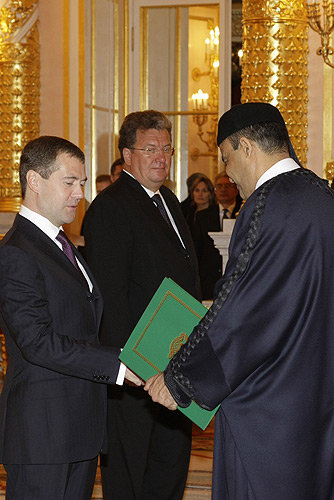
Amir al-Arabi Ali Gharib presents his credentials to Dmitry Medvedev in October 2009.

Amir al-Arabi Ali Gharib is a Libyan diplomat and Former Ambassador of Libya to Russia, presenting his credentials to Russian president Dmitry Medvedev on 12 October 2009.

He graduated from the Faculty of Missile Engineering in Kiev in 1984. In 1993 he defended his thesis at Ukrainian Academy of Air Defense .
