= Mominpura, Nagpur =

Neighborhood in central Nagpur in India

Mominpura (Urdu: مومنپور٥, Marathi: मोमिनपूरा) is a neighborhood in Nagpur in Maharashtra, India. Mominpura is located in the central Nagpur area. It is surrounded by Ansar Nagar, Itwari, Bajeria, Hansapuri, Boriyapura and Timki.

During the month of Ramadan, a street market for clothes, snacks, footwear, ornaments and other wares is set up.

== History ==
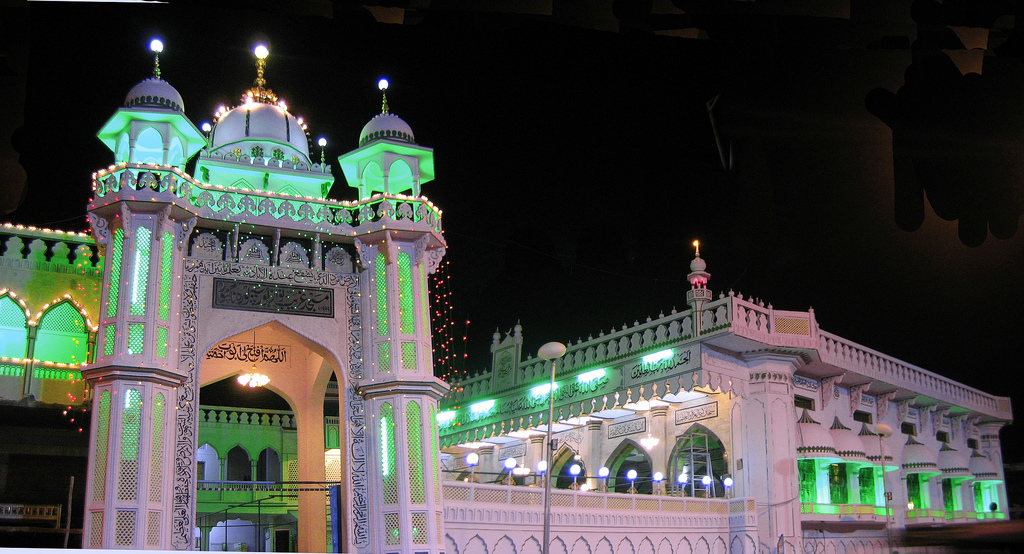
Masjid Gharib Nawaz At Night.

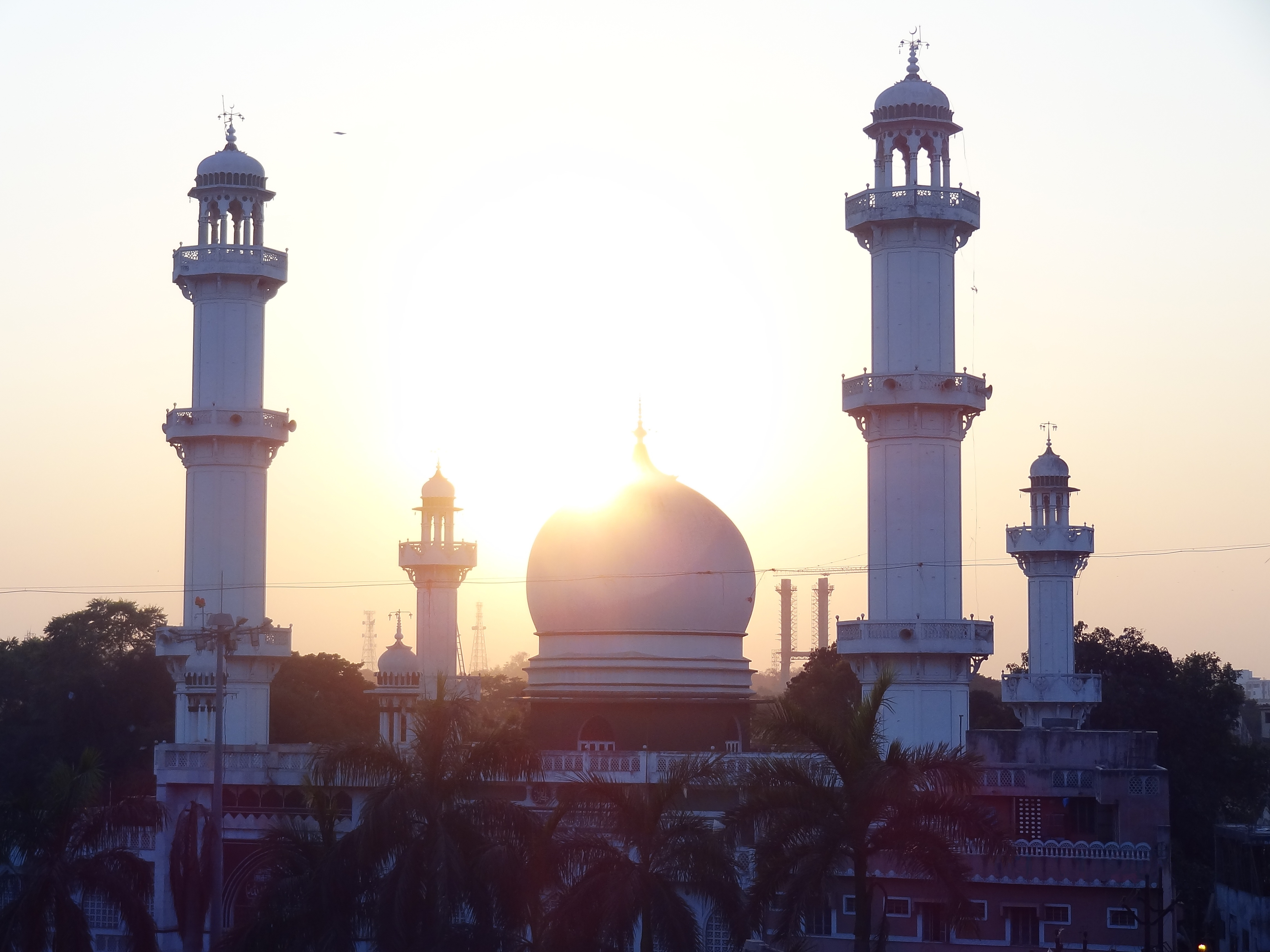
Jama Masjid During Sunset.

Three brothers, Ghulam Ali (Kotwal), Mohammad Saaduddin (Subedar), and Mohammad Saladuddin (Minister and Kotwal) from Jhajjar are remembered as Urdu and Persian scholars during the reign of Maharaja Senasaheb Subha Chhatrapati Raghuji Bapusaheb Bhonsle III. They founded 'Jhajjar Bagh' at Hansapuri (Now Mominpura). They built their residence 'Aina-e Mahal', a well and a Masjid (now Masjid Ahle Hadith). Also known as 'Subedar ka Bada', 'Jhajjar Bagh' was located where Mohammad Ali Road at Mominpura, Jama Masjid, Mohammad Ali Sarai and Furqania Madrasa are now situated.

== Mustafa Baba ==
Hazarat Mustafa Baba, was a Sufi saint who lived in Mominpura, had followers from many nearby cities. Baba had become famous for his spiritual powers. On the night of 28 June 2011, he died, after which his followers buried his body in the playground owned by Central Tanzim Committee, which is not a registered area for burials. Baba's funeral procession had headed to Mota Tajbagh in the late evening after daylong controversy.

His followers brought his body back to Mominpura, as they did not agree to certain conditions decreed by the Tajbagh dargah committee for burial. They broke open the lock of Mohammed Ali Serai's gate and apparently buried the Baba in front of the school, inside the Serai, at 5:30 am.

Serai management protested the act and approached the Tehsil police. It filed a complaint of trespassing against Baba's followers. Police said that the followers had assured them they would take the body to Mominpura burial ground, but later deviated from the plan.

The followers broke the Serai's lock in the presence of the police and this triggered the Gherao at the central police office later in the day. One of the agitators stated that it was not right to bury the Baba in the Serai that has the Jama Masjid close by. "There are bound to be clashes and frequent skirmishes if the two venues are so closely located. During festivals, it can get difficult. Devotees of one venue may be inconvenienced by presence of another," he said.

This led to riots between two groups, and rioters burned Baba's belongings. The rioters threw stones, damaged property and attacked police personnel and vehicles. Around 20 vehicles parked in the Sindhi Lane were damaged. A few traffic policemen were attacked by the protestors near the Geetanjali theatre. Some injured civilians and policemen were taken to hospital. Riot police were deployed at the pickets in disturbed areas. A youth was critically injured in the riot, and a section of the rioters ransacked the office of president of Mohammed Ali Serai and damaged its property. Police fired several tear gas shells and resorted to charging with their lathis.
