= Kumedpur Junction railway station =

Railway station in West Bengal, India

General information
- Location: Telgram, Kumedpur, Malda district, West Bengal; India
- Coordinates: 25°26′00″N 87°48′16″E
- Elevation: 31 m (102 ft)
- System: Passenger train & Express train station
- Owner: Indian Railways
- Operator: Northeast Frontier Railway
- Line: Howrah–New Jalpaiguri line
- Platforms: 4
- Tracks: 2

Construction
- Structure type: Standard (on ground station)
- Parking: Yes

Other information
- Status: Active
- Station code: KDPR
- Zone(s): Northeast Frontier Railway
- Division(s): Katihar

History
- Former names: East Indian Railway Company
Location

Kumedpur Junction railway station is a railway Junction station on the Howrah–New Jalpaiguri line of Katihar railway division of Northeast Frontier Railway zone. This station connects Katihar Junction with Howrah–New Jalpaiguri railway route. It is situated at Telgram, Kumedpur of Malda district in the Indian state of West Bengal. Total 33 trains including a number of express trains stop at Kumedpur Junction railway station.
