= Azamnagar Road railway station =

Railway station in Bihar

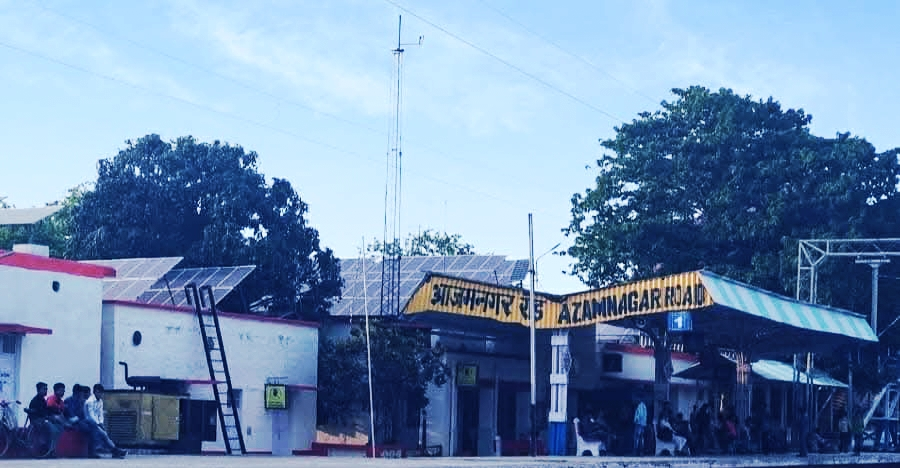

General information
- Location: Barhat, Azamnagar, Katihar district, Bihar; India
- Coordinates: 25°33′20″N 87°51′08″E
- Elevation: 34 m (112 ft)
- System: Passenger train, Express train station
- Owner: Indian Railways
- Operator: Northeast Frontier Railway
- Line: Howrah–New Jalpaiguri line
- Platforms: 3
- Tracks: 2

Construction
- Structure type: Standard (on ground station)
- Parking: No

Other information
- Status: Active
- Station code: AZR
- Zone(s): Northeast Frontier Railway
- Division(s): Katihar

History
- Former names: East Indian Railway Company

Services
Preceding station	Indian Railways	Following station
Bhawanipur Bihar towards ?	Eastern Railway zone Howrah–New Jalpaiguri line	Kamalpur Halt towards ?
Location

Azamnagar Road railway station is a railway station on the Howrah–New Jalpaiguri line of Katihar railway division of Northeast Frontier Railway zone. It is situated at Barhat, Azamnagar of Katihar district in the Indian state of Bihar. Toatal 24 Express and passengers trains stop at Azamnagar Road railway station.
