= KSR Bangalore–Bhagat Ki Kothi Express (via Ballari) =

Train in India

Bhagat Ki Kothi–KSR Bengaluru Express
Overview
- Service type: Express
- Locale: Karnataka, Andhra Pradesh, Maharashtra, Gujarat & Rajasthan
- Current operator: South Western Railway

Route
- Termini: Bhagat Ki Kothi (BGKT); KSR Bengaluru (SBC)
- Stops: 29
- Distance travelled: 2,177 km (1,353 mi)
- Average journey time: 47 hours 40 mins
- Service frequency: Weekly
- Train number: 16533 / 16534

On-board services
- Classes: AC 1 tier, AC 2 tier, AC 3 tier, Sleeper class, General Unreserved
- Seating arrangements: Yes
- Sleeping arrangements: Yes
- Catering facilities: Pantry car, E-catering, On-board catering
- Observation facilities: Large windows

Technical
- Rolling stock: LHB coach
- Track gauge: 1,676 mm (5 ft 6 in)
- Operating speed: 46 km/h (29 mph) average with halts

The 16533 / 16534 KSR Bengaluru–Bhagat Ki Kothi Express is an Express train belonging to Indian Railways South Western Railway zone that runs between Bhagat Ki Kothi and KSR Bengaluru in India.

It operates as train number 16533 from KSR Bengaluru to Bhagat Ki Kothi and as train number 16534 in the reverse direction, serving the states of Rajasthan, Gujarat, Maharashtra, Andhra Pradesh and Karnataka.

== Coach composition ==
The train has LHB rakes with a maximum speed of 130 km/h. The train consists of 26 coaches:

- 1 AC First Class
- 3 AC II Tier
- 4 AC III Tier
- 11 Sleeper coaches
- 1 Pantry Car
- 4 General Unreserved
- 2 Seating cum Luggage Rake

As is customary with most train services in India, coach composition may be amended at the discretion of Indian Railways depending on demand.

Loco	1	2	3	4	5	6	7	8	9	10	11	12	13	14	15	16	17	18	19	20	21	22	23	24	25	26
	SLR	GEN	GEN	H1	A1	A2	A3	B1	B2	B3	B4	S1	S2	PC	S3	S4	S5	S6	S7	S8	S9	S10	S11	GEN	GEN	SLR

== Service ==
- 16533/ Bhagat Ki Kothi–KSR Bengaluru Express covers the distance of 2,177 km (1,353 mi) in 47 hours 35 mins (46 km/h).
- The 16534/ KSR Bengaluru–Bhagat Ki Kothi Express covers the distance of 2,177 km (1,353 mi) in 47 hours 50 mins (46 km/h).

As the average speed of the train is lower than 55 km/h (34 mph), as per railway rules, its fare doesn't includes a Superfast surcharge.

== Routing ==
The 16533 / 34 Bhagat Ki kothi-KSR Bengaluru Express runs from Bhagat Ki Kothi via Luni Junction, Marwar Junction, Ahmedabad Junction, Vadodara Junction, Bharuch Junction, Surat, Vasai Road, Kalyan Junction, Pune Junction, Belagavi, Hubballi Junction, Ballari Junction, Guntakal Junction KSR Bengaluru

== Schedule ==
Train number	Station code	Departure station	Departure time	Departure day	Arrival station	Arrival time	Arrival Day
16533	JU	Jodhpur Junction	06:20 AM	Wed	KSR Bengaluru	02:30 AM	Fri
16534	SBC	KSR Bengaluru	17:00 PM	Sun	Jodhpur Junction	14:15 PM	Tue

== Rake sharing ==
The train shares its rake with;

- 16573/16574 Yesvantpur–Puducherry Weekly Express,
- 16507/16508 KSR Bengaluru–Jodhpur Express (via Davangere),
- 16505/16506 Gandhidham–KSR Bengaluru Express,
- 16531/16532 Ajmer - KSR Bengaluru Garib Nawaz Express.

== Traction ==
Earlier this train run with WDP-4B. As the route is fully electrified, a Krishnarajapuram Loco Shed-based WAP-7 electric locomotive pulls the train to its destination.
