= Diesel & Electric Loco Shed, Krishnarajapuram =

Loco shed in Karnataka, India

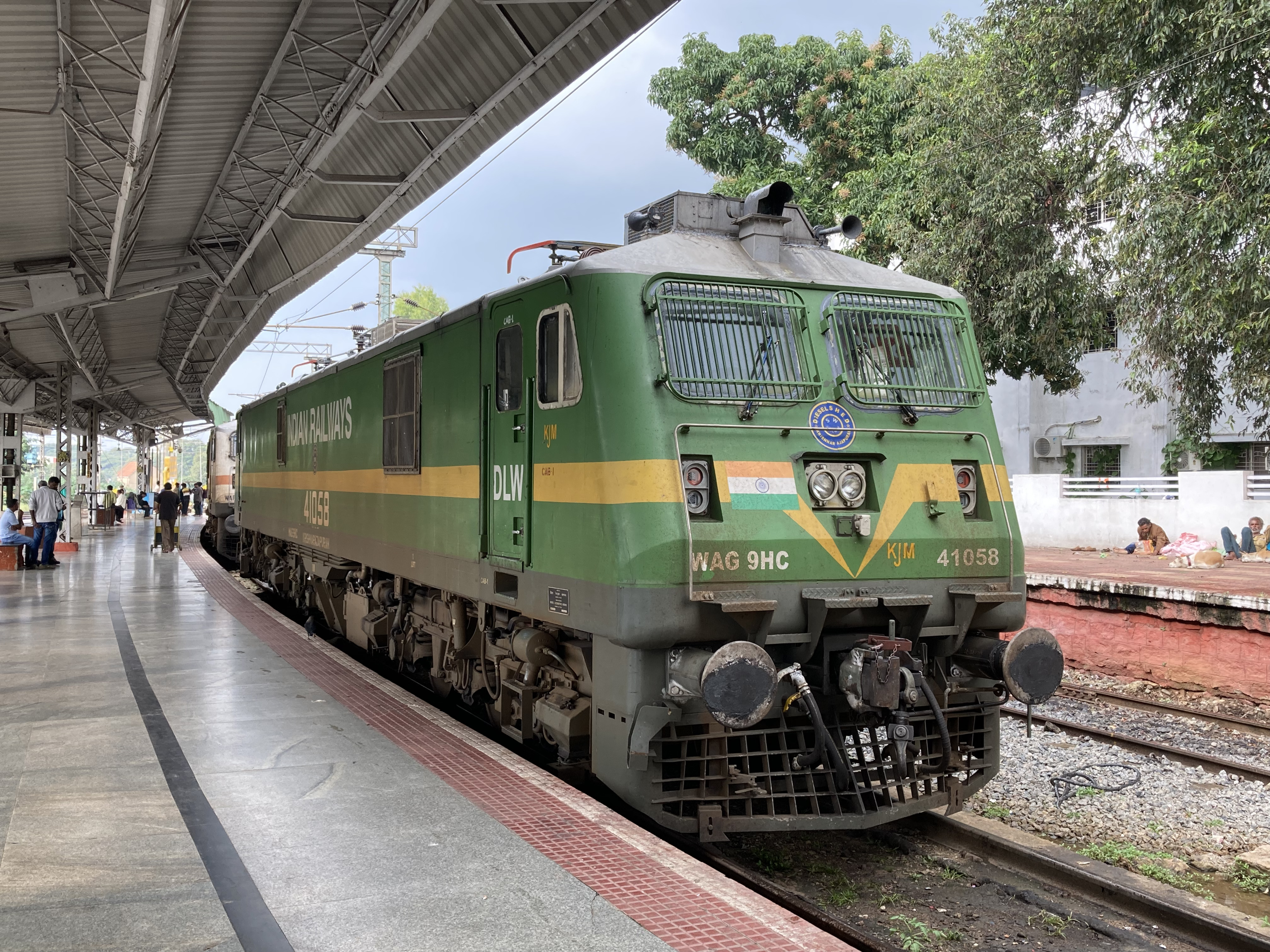
- KJM based WAG-9HC rest at KSR Bengaluru

- Location within Bengaluru

Location
- Location: Devasandra, Krishnarajapuram, Bengaluru, Karnataka, 560036, India
- Coordinates: 13.002399°N 77.692842°E,

Characteristics
- Owner: Indian Railways
- Operator: South Western Railway zone
- Depot code: KJM
- Type: Engine shed
- Rolling stock: WDM-3A, WDM-3D, WDS-6, WDG-3A, WDP-4, WDP-4D, WDG-4, WAP-5, WAP-7, WAG-9

History
- Opened: 1986; 40 years ago
- Former rolling stock: WDM-2

The Diesel & Electric Loco Shed, Krishnarajapuram is a motive power depot performing locomotive maintenance and repair facility for diesel locomotives and electric locomotives of the Indian Railways, located at Krishnarajapuram (KJM) of the South Western Railway zone in the city of Bengaluru, Karnataka. It is one of two diesel loco sheds and only electric loco sheds of the South Western Railway, the other being at Hubballi.

== Livery and markings ==
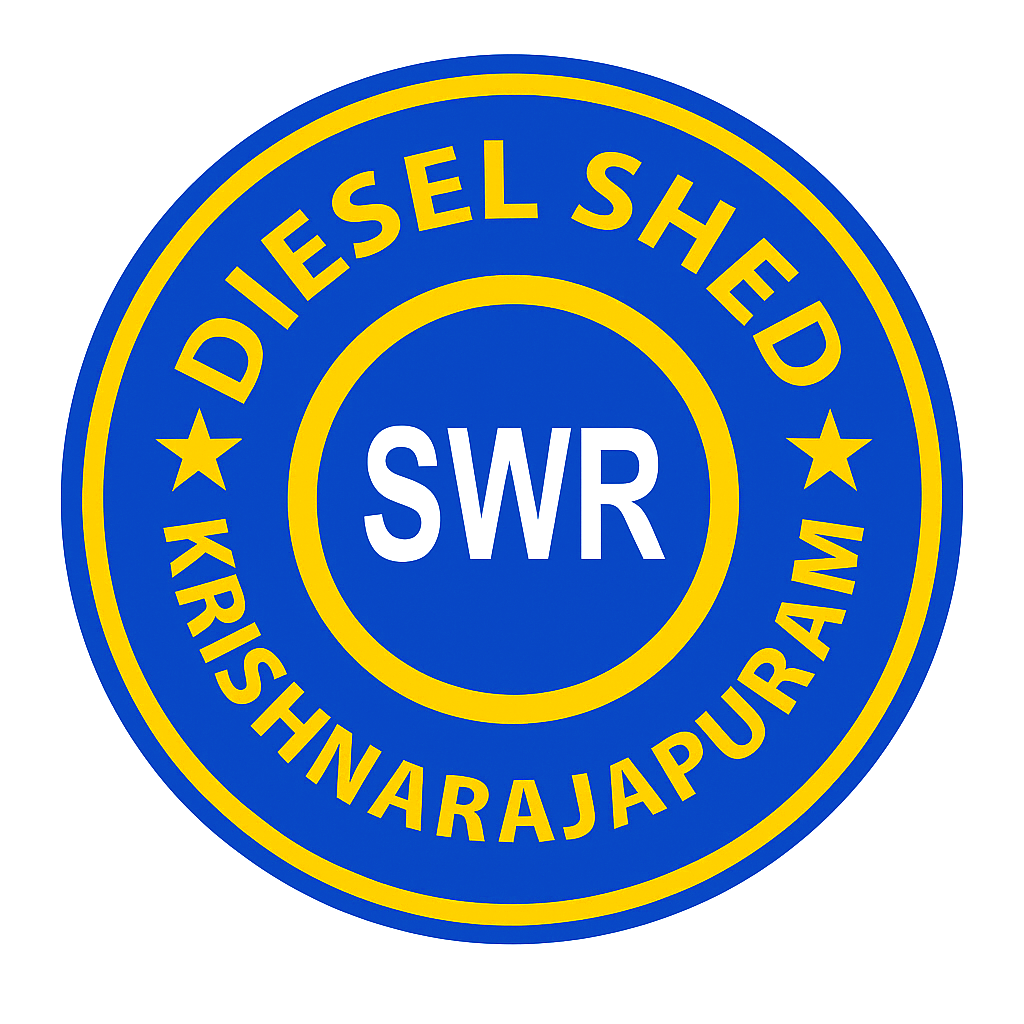
Logo Mark of Diesel Loco Shed, Krishnarajapuram

KJM based locomotives have a standard shed livery. KJM DLS has its own markings and stencils. It is written on loco's body as well as front and back side.

== Diesel Locomotives ==
Serial No.	Locomotive Class	Horsepower	Quantity
1.	WDG-3A	3100	8
2.	WDM-3A	3100	8
3.	WDM-3D	3300	4
4.	WDP-4/4D	4000/4500	103
5.	WDG-4/4D	4000/4500	26
6.	WDS-6	1400	4
Total Diesel Locomotives Active as of July 2025			153

== Electric Locomotives ==
Serial No.	Locomotive Class	Horsepower	Quantity
1.	WAP-5	6120	4
2.	WAP-7	6350	99
3.	WAG-9	6122	103
Total Locomotives Active as of May 2026			198
