= 2019 Indian general election in Bihar =

Indian lower house election in Bihar

- 11 April to 19 May 2019

All 40 constituencies from Bihar to the Lok Sabha
- Turnout: 57.33% (▲1.07%)
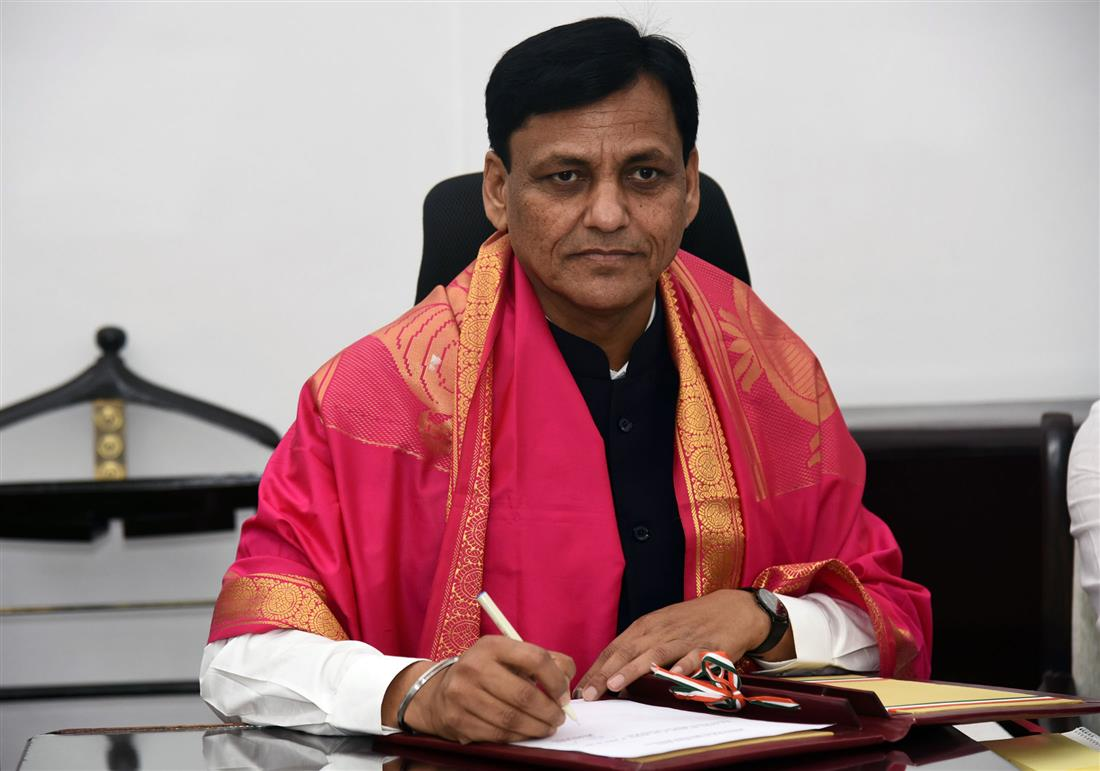

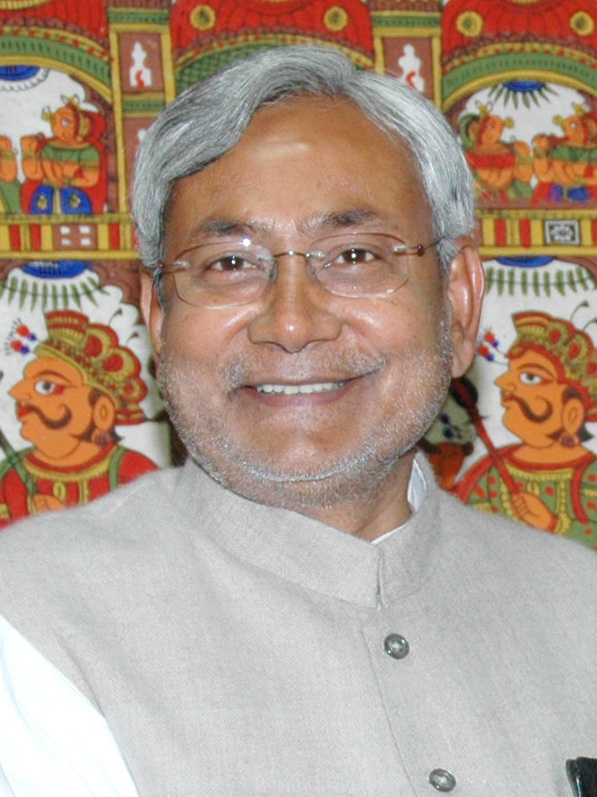

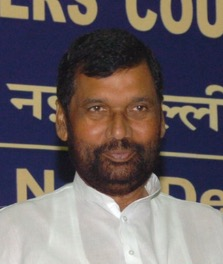

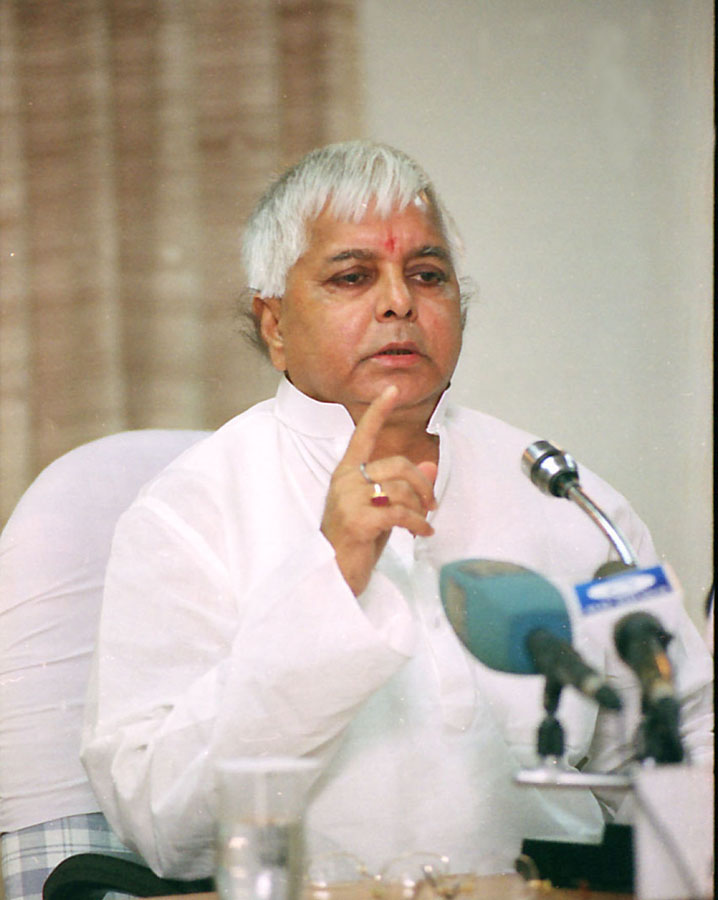

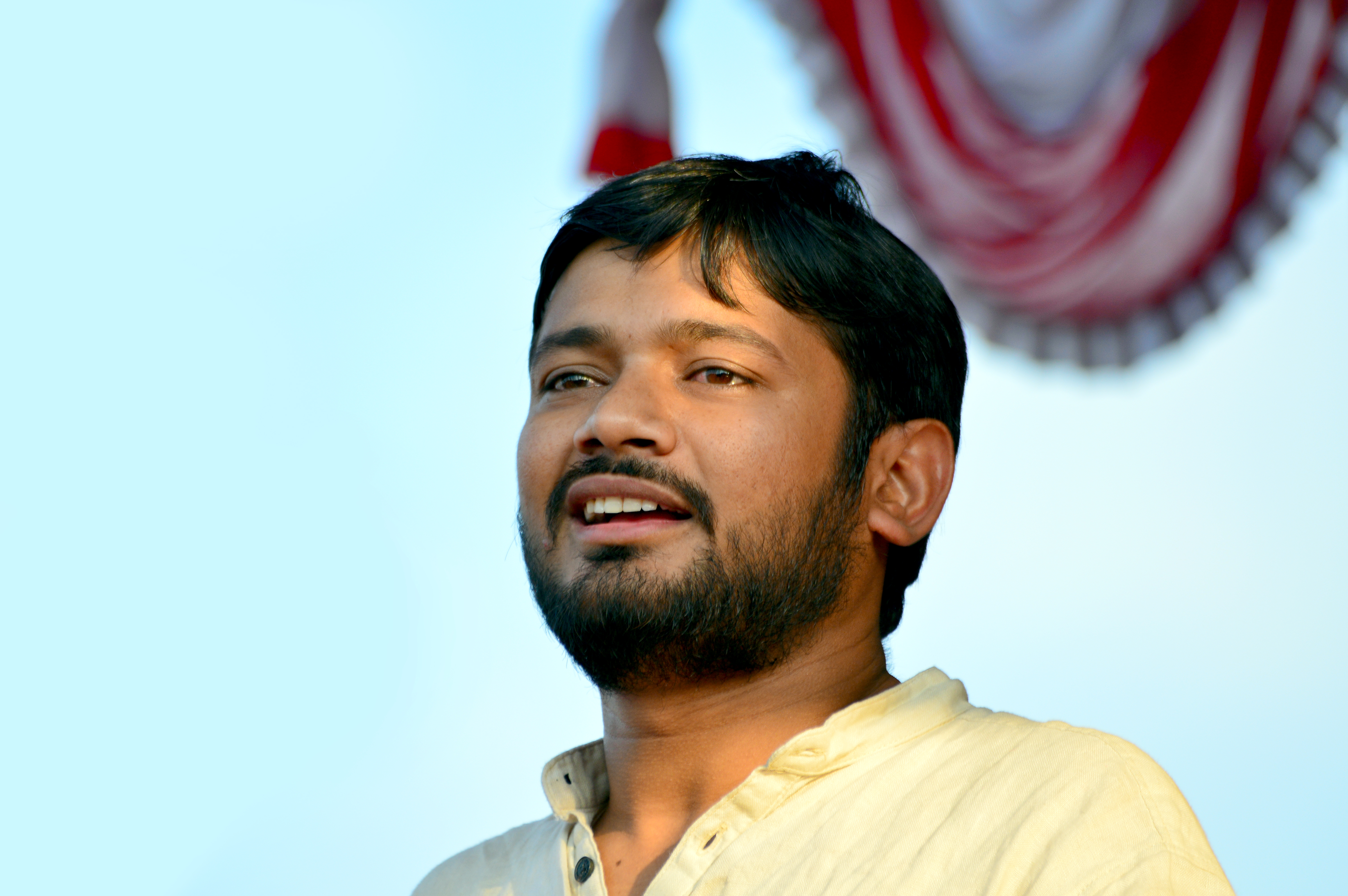
	Majority party	Minority party	Third party
Leader	Nityanand Rai	Nitish Kumar	Ram Vilas Paswan
Party	BJP	JD(U)	LJP
Alliance	NDA	NDA	NDA
Leader's seat	Ujiarpur (Won)	Did not contest	Did not contest
Last election	22	2	6
Seats won	17	16	6
Seat change	▼5	▲14	Steady
Percentage	23.58	21.81	7.86
Swing	▼5.82	▲6.01	▲1.46
	Fourth party	Fifth party	Sixth party
Leader	Madan Mohan Jha	Lalu Prasad Yadav	Kanhaiya Kumar
Party	INC	RJD	CPI
Alliance	MGB	MGB	LF
Leader's seat	Did not contest	Did not contest	Begusarai (lost)
Last election	2	4	0
Seats won	1	0	0
Seat change	▼1	▼4	Steady
Percentage	7.70	15.36	2.21%
Swing	▼0.7	▼4.74
Prime Minister before election
Narendra Modi
BJP
Prime Minister after election
Narendra Modi
BJP

The 2019 Indian general elections held in India between 11 April and 23 April 2019 to constitute the 17th Lok Sabha. The election in Bihar took place in seven phases.

== Election schedule ==
The constituency-wise election schedule is as follows:

Phase	Poll date	Constituencies	Voter turnout (%)
1	11 April	Aurangabad, Gaya, Nawada, Jamui	53.60
2	18 April	Kishanganj, Katihar, Purnia, Bhagalpur, Banka	62.93
3	23 April	Jhanjharpur, Supaul, Araria, Madhepura, Khagaria	61.26
4	29 April	Darbhanga, Ujiarpur, Samastipur, Begusarai, Munger	59.35
5	6 May	Sitamarhi, Madhubani, Muzaffarpur, Saran, Hajipur	57.19
6	12 May	Valmiki Nagar, Paschim Champaran, Purvi Champaran, Sheohar, Vaishali, Gopalganj, Siwan, Maharajganj	58.65
7	19 May	Nalanda, Patna Sahib, Pataliputra, Arrah, Buxar, Sasaram, Karakat, Jahanabad	51.34

== Parties and alliances ==
=== National Democratic Alliance ===
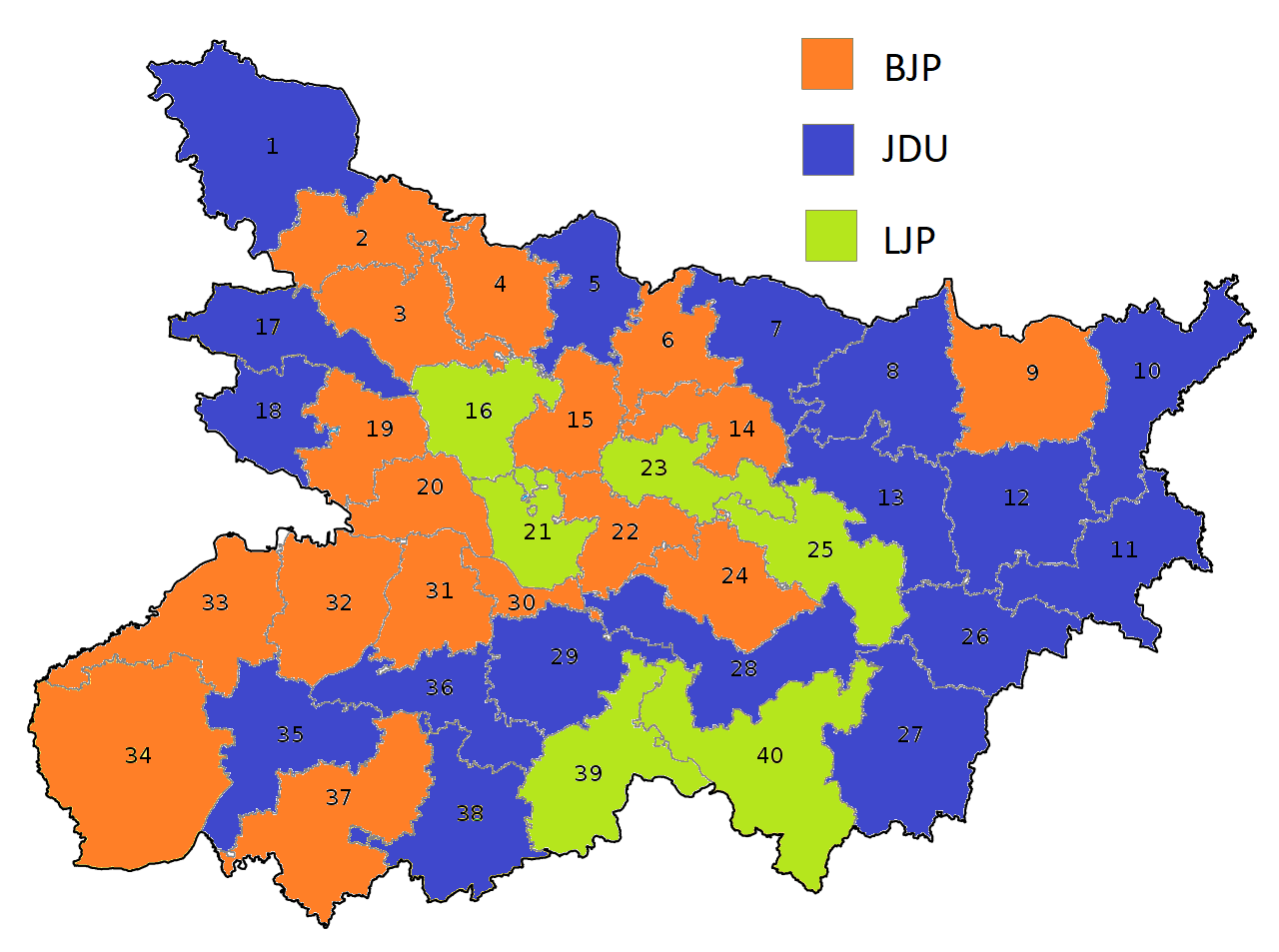
NDA Seat Sharing

National Democratic Alliance
Party	Flag	Symbol	Leader	Seats
Bharatiya Janata Party			Nityanand Rai	17
Janata Dal (United)			Nitish Kumar	17
Lok Janshakti Party			Ram Vilas Paswan	6
Total				40

=== United Progressive Alliance ===
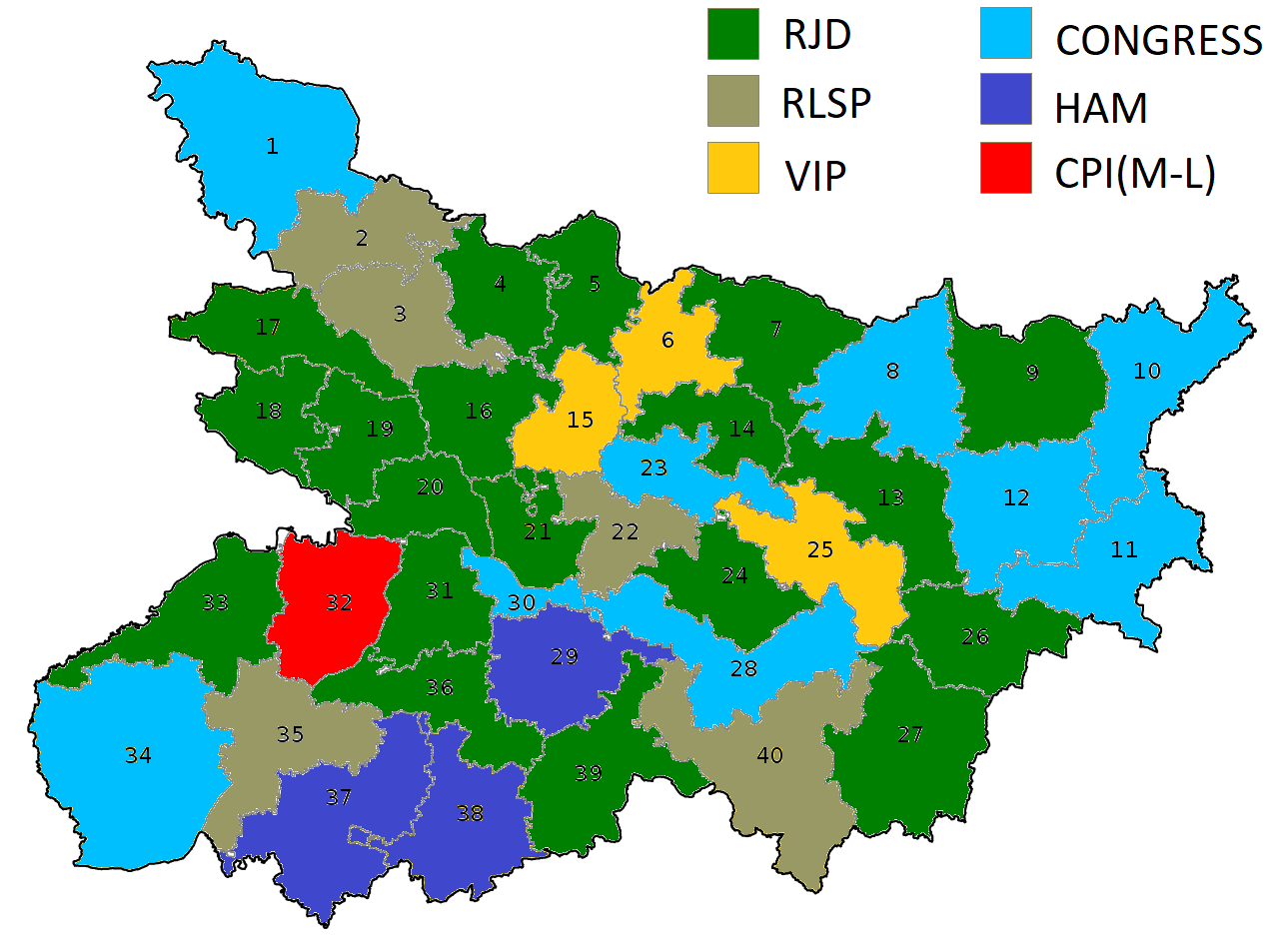
MGB Seat Sharing

United Progressive Alliance
Party	Flag	Symbol	Leader	Seats
Rashtriya Janata Dal			Lalu Prasad Yadav	19
Indian National Congress			Madan Mohan Jha	9
Rashtriya Lok Samata Party			Upendra Kushwaha	5
Hindustani Awam Morcha			Jitan Ram Manjhi	3
Vikassheel Insaan Party			Mukesh Sahani	3
Communist Party of India (Marxist–Leninist) Liberation			Dipankar Bhattacharya	1 (Note: CPI(M-L)L which was not the part of Mahagathbandhan but one of its candidate was supported by the members of UPA Alliance.)
Total				40

== Candidates ==
Constituency		NDA		UPA	
#	Name	Party	Candidate	Party	Candidate
1	Valmiki Nagar	JD(U)	Baidyanath Prasad Mahto	INC	Shashwat Kedar
2	Paschim Champaran	BJP	Sanjay Jaiswal	RLSP	Brijesh Kumar Kushwaha
3	Purvi Champaran	BJP	Radha Mohan Singh	RLSP	Aakash Prasad Singh
4	Sheohar	BJP	Rama Devi	RJD	Syed Faisal Ali
5	Sitamarhi	JD(U)	Sunil Kumar Pintu	RJD	Arjun Ray
6	Madhubani	BJP	Ashok Kumar Yadav	VIP	Badri Kumar Purbey
7	Jhanjharpur	JD(U)	Ramprit Mandal	RJD	Gulab Yadav
8	Supaul	JD(U)	Dileshwar Kamait	INC	Ranjeet Ranjan
9	Araria	BJP	Pradeep Kumar Singh	RJD	Sarfaraz Alam
10	Kishanganj	JD(U)	Syed Mahmood Ashraf	INC	Mohammad Jawed
11	Katihar	JD(U)	Dulal Chandra Goswami	INC	Tariq Anwar
12	Purnia	JD(U)	Santosh Kumar Kushwaha	INC	Uday Singh
13	Madhepura	JD(U)	Dinesh Chandra Yadav	RJD	Sharad Yadav
14	Darbhanga	BJP	Gopal Jee Thakur	RJD	Abdul Bari Siddiqui
15	Muzaffarpur	BJP	Ajay Nishad	VIP	Raj Bhushan Choudhary
16	Vaishali	LJP	Veena Devi	RJD	Raghuvansh Prasad Singh
17	Gopalganj	JD(U)	Alok Kumar Suman	RJD	Surendra Ram
18	Siwan	JD(U)	Kavita Singh	RJD	Hena Shahab
19	Maharajganj	BJP	Janardan Singh Sigriwal	RJD	Randhir Singh
20	Saran	BJP	Rajiv Pratap Rudy	RJD	Chandrika Roy
21	Hajipur	LJP	Pashupati Kumar Paras	RJD	Shiv Chandra Ram
22	Ujiarpur	BJP	Nityanand Rai	RLSP	Upendra Kushwaha
23	Samastipur	LJP	Ram Chandra Paswan	INC	Ashok Kumar
24	Begusarai	BJP	Giriraj Singh	RJD	Tanweer Hassan
25	Khagaria	LJP	Mehboob Ali Kaiser	VIP	Mukesh Sahani
26	Bhagalpur	JD(U)	Ajay Kumar Mandal	RJD	Shailesh Kumar Mandal
27	Banka	JD(U)	Giridhari Yadav	RJD	Jay Prakash Narayan Yadav
28	Munger	JD(U)	Rajiv Ranjan Singh	INC	Nilam Devi
29	Nalanda	JD(U)	Kaushalendra Kumar	HAM(S)	Ashok Kumar Azad
30	Patna Sahib	BJP	Ravi Shankar Prasad	INC	Shatrughan Sinha
31	Pataliputra	BJP	Ram Kripal Yadav	RJD	Misa Bharti
32	Arrah	BJP	Raj Kumar Singh	CPI(ML)L	Raju Yadav
33	Buxar	BJP	Ashwini Kumar Choubey	RJD	Jagada Nand Singh
34	Sasaram	BJP	Chhedi Paswan	INC	Meira Kumar
35	Karakat	JD(U)	Mahabali Singh	RLSP	Upendra Kushwaha
36	Jahanabad	JD(U)	Chandeshwar Prasad	RJD	Surendra Prasad Yadav
37	Aurangabad	BJP	Sushil Kumar Singh	HAM(S)	Upendra Prasad
38	Gaya	JD(U)	Vijay Manjhi	HAM(S)	Jitan Ram Manjhi
39	Nawada	LJP	Chandan Singh	RJD	Vibha Devi
40	Jamui	LJP	Chirag Paswan	RLSP	Bhudeo Choudhary

== Opinion Poll ==
Date published	Polling agency			Lead
Date published	Polling agency	NDA	MGB	Lead
6 April 2019	IndiaTV - CNX	29	11	18
5 April 2019	Republic TV - Jan Ki Baat	31	9	22
Jan 2019	ABP News - CVoter	35	5	30
Nov 2018	ABP News - CVoter	34	6	28
Oct 2018	ABP News - CSDS	22	18	4
Oct 2018	ABP News - CSDS	31	9	22

== Results ==
=== Party wise ===
17	16	6	1
BJP	JD(U)	LJP	INC

=== Results by Alliance or Party ===
Alliance/ Party		Popular vote			Seats		
Alliance/ Party		Votes	%	±pp	Contested	Won	+/−
NDA	BJP	96,19,458	24.05%	▼5.82	17	17	▼5
NDA	JD(U)	89,02,719	22.26%	▲6.22	17	16	▲14
NDA	LJP	32,06,979	8.01%	▲1.51	6	6	Steady
NDA	Total	21,729,156	54.32%		40	39	
UPA	RJD	62,70,769	15.68%	▼4.78	19	0	▼4
UPA	INC	31,40,797	7.85%	▼0.71	9	1	▼1
UPA	RLSP	14,62,518	3.66%	▲0.66	5	0	▼3
UPA	VIP	6,60,706	1.66%	New	4	0	Steady
UPA	HAM	9,56,501	2.39%	New	3	0	Steady
UPA	CPI(ML)L	4,19,195	1.04%	Steady	1	0	Steady
UPA	Total	12,910,486	32.46%		40	1	
IND		2,227,705	5.57%	Steady	Steady	0	Steady
NOTA		816,950	2.04%	Steady			
Total		3,99,89,711	100%	Steady	Steady	40	Steady

=== Constituency-wise Results ===
Constituency		Winner				Runner Up				Margin	%
#	Name	Candidate	Party	Votes	%	Candidate	Party	Votes	%	Margin	%
1	Valmiki Nagar	Baidyanath Prasad Mahto	JD(U)	602,660	58.38	Shashwat Kedar	INC	248,044	24.03	354,616	34.35
2	Paschim Champaran	Sanjay Jaiswal	BJP	603,706	59.57	Brijesh Kumar Kushwaha	RLSP	309,800	30.57	293,906	29.00
3	Purvi Champaran	Radha Mohan Singh	BJP	577,787	57.77	Aakash Kumar Singh	RLSP	284,139	28.41	293,648	29.36
4	Sheohar	Rama Devi	BJP	608,678	60.57	Syed Faisal Ali	RJD	268,318	26.70	340,360	33.87
5	Sitamarhi	Sunil Kumar Pintu	JD(U)	567,745	54.61	Arjun Ray	RJD	317,206	30.51	250,539	24.10
6	Madhubani	Ashok Kumar Yadav	BJP	595,843	61.76	Badri Kumar Purbey	VSIP	140,903	14.61	454,940	47.15
7	Jhanjharpur	Ramprit Mandal	JD(U)	602,391	56.70	Gulab Yadav	RJD	279,440	26.30	322,951	30.40
8	Supaul	Dileshwar Kamait	JD(U)	597,377	53.77	Ranjeet Ranjan	INC	330,524	29.75	266,853	24.02
9	Araria	Pradeep Kumar Singh	BJP	618,434	52.87	Sarfaraz Alam	RJD	481,193	41.14	137,241	11.73
10	Kishanganj	Mohammad Jawed	INC	367,017	33.32	Syed Mahmood Ashraf	JD(U)	332,551	30.19	34,466	3.13
11	Katihar	Dulal Chandra Goswami	JD(U)	559,423	50.02	Tariq Anwar	INC	502,220	44.91	57,203	5.11
12	Purnia	Santosh Kumar Kushwaha	JD(U)	632,924	54.85	Uday Singh	INC	369,463	32.02	263,461	22.83
13	Madhepura	Dinesh Chandra Yadav	JD(U)	624,334	54.40	Sharad Yadav	RJD	322,807	28.13	301,527	26.27
14	Darbhanga	Gopal Jee Thakur	BJP	586,668	60.76	Abdul Bari Siddiqui	RJD	318,689	33.01	267,979	27.75
15	Muzaffarpur	Ajay Nishad	BJP	666,878	63.00	Raj Bhushan Choudhary	VSIP	256,890	24.27	409,988	38.73
16	Vaishali	Veena Devi	LJP	568,215	52.87	Raghuvansh Prasad Singh	RJD	333,631	31.04	234,584	21.83
17	Gopalganj	Alok Kumar Suman	JD(U)	568,150	55.37	Surendra Ram	RJD	281,716	27.46	286,434	27.91
18	Siwan	Kavita Singh	JD(U)	448,473	45.54	Hena Shahab	RJD	331,515	33.66	116,958	11.88
19	Maharajganj	Janardan Singh Sigriwal	BJP	546,352	56.15	Randhir Kumar Singh	RJD	315,580	32.43	230,772	23.72
20	Saran	Rajiv Pratap Rudy	BJP	499,986	52.99	Chandrika Roy	RJD	361,575	38.32	138,411	14.67
21	Hajipur (SC)	Pashupati Kumar Paras	LJP	541,310	53.72	Shiv Chandra Ram	RJD	335,861	33.33	205,449	20.39
22	Ujiarpur	Nityanand Rai	BJP	543,906	56.08	Upendra Kushwaha	RLSP	266,628	27.49	277,278	28.59
23	Samastipur (SC)	Ram Chandra Paswan	LJP	562,443	55.15	Dr. Ashok Kumar	INC	310,800	30.48	251,643	24.67
24	Begusarai	Giriraj Singh	BJP	692,193	56.44	Kanhaiya Kumar	CPI	269,976	22.01	422,217	34.43
25	Khagaria	Mehboob Ali Kaiser	LJP	510,193	52.74	Mukesh Sahani	VSIP	261,623	27.04	248,570	25.70
26	Bhagalpur	Ajay Kumar Mandal	JD(U)	618,254	59.27	Shailesh Kumar Mandal	RJD	340,624	32.65	277,630	26.62
27	Banka	Giridhari Yadav	JD(U)	477,788	47.98	Jay Prakash Narayan	RJD	277,256	27.84	200,532	20.14
28	Munger	Lalan Singh	JD(U)	528,762	51.02	Nilam Devi	INC	360,825	34.81	167,937	16.21
29	Nalanda	Kaushalendra Kumar	JD(U)	540,888	52.42	Ashok Kumar Azad	HAM(S)	284,751	27.60	256,137	24.82
30	Patna Sahib	Ravi Shankar Prasad	BJP	607,506	61.81	Shatrughan Sinha	INC	322,849	32.85	284,657	28.96
31	Pataliputra	Ram Kripal Yadav	BJP	509,557	47.23	Misa Bharti	RJD	470,236	43.59	39,321	3.64
32	Arrah	R. K. Singh	BJP	566,480	52.33	Raju Yadav	CPI(ML)L	419,195	38.73	147,285	13.60
33	Buxar	Ashwini Choubey	BJP	473,053	47.93	Jagada Nand Singh	RJD	355,444	36.01	117,609	11.92
34	Sasaram (SC)	Chhedi Paswan	BJP	494,800	50.72	Meira Kumar	INC	329,055	33.73	165,745	16.99
35	Karakat	Mahabali Singh	JD(U)	398,408	45.82	Upendra Kushwaha	RLSP	313,866	36.10	84,542	9.72
36	Jahanabad	Chandeshwar Prasad	JD(U)	335,584	40.81	Surendra Prasad Yadav	RJD	333,833	40.60	1,751	0.21
37	Aurangabad	Sushil Kumar Singh	BJP	427,721	45.72	Upendra Prasad	HAM(S)	357,169	38.18	70,552	7.54
38	Gaya (SC)	Vijay Kumar Manjhi	JD(U)	467,007	48.77	Jitan Ram Manjhi	HAM(S)	314,581	32.85	152,426	15.92
39	Nawada	Chandan Singh	LJP	495,684	52.47	Vibha Devi Yadav	RJD	347,612	36.80	148,072	15.67
40	Jamui (SC)	Chirag Paswan	LJP	529,134	55.72	Bhudeo Choudhary	RLSP	288,085	30.34	241,049	25.38

== Post-election Union Council of Ministers from Bihar ==
#	Name	Constituency	Designation	Department	From	To	Party
1	Giriraj Singh	Begusarai	Cabinet Minister	Minister of Rural Development; Minister of Panchayati Raj (from July 2021); Minister of Fisheries, Animal Husbandry and Dairying (until July 2021)	31 May 2019	9 June 2024	BJP
2	R. K. Singh	Arrah	Cabinet Minister	Minister of Power; Minister of New and Renewable Energy (Cabinet rank from July 2021, MoS (I/C) prior); MoS for Skill Development and Entrepreneurship (until July 2021)	31 May 2019	9 June 2024	BJP
3	Ravi Shankar Prasad	Patna Sahib	Cabinet Minister	Minister of Law and Justice; Minister of Communications; Minister of Electronics and Information Technology	31 May 2019	7 July 2021	BJP
4	Ashwini Kumar Choubey	Buxar	MoS	Ministry of Consumer Affairs, Food and Public Distribution (from July 2021); Ministry of Environment, Forest and Climate Change (from July 2021); Ministry of Health and Family Welfare (until July 2021)	31 May 2019	9 June 2024	BJP
5	Nityanand Rai	Ujiarpur	MoS	Ministry of Home Affairs	31 May 2019	9 June 2024	BJP
6	Ram Vilas Paswan	Rajya Sabha (Bihar)	Cabinet Minister	Minister of Consumer Affairs, Food and Public Distribution	31 May 2019	8 October 2020 (Died)	LJP
7	Pashupati Kumar Paras	Hajipur (SC)	Cabinet Minister	Minister of Food Processing Industries	7 July 2021	19 March 2024 (Resigned)	RLJP
8	Ramchandra Prasad Singh	Rajya Sabha (Bihar)	Cabinet Minister	Minister of Steel	7 July 2021	6 July 2022 (Resigned)	JD(U)

== By-Polls Held ==
Constituency			Winner				Runner Up				Margin
No.	Name	Date	Candidate	Party	Votes	%	Candidate	Party	Votes	%	Margin
23	Samastipur (SC)	21 October 2019	Prince Raj	LJP	390,276	49.48	Ashok Kumar	INC	288,186	36.54	102,090
23	Samastipur (SC)	21 October 2019	The Samastipur Lok Sabha bypoll was held to fill the vacancy caused by the death of the incumbent MP, Ram Chandra Paswan.								
1	Valmiki Nagar	7 November 2020	Sunil Kumar Kushwaha	JD(U)	403,360	38.08	Pravesh Kumar Mishra	INC	380,821	35.95	22,539
1	Valmiki Nagar	7 November 2020	The Valmiki Nagar Lok Sabha bypoll was held to fill the vacancy caused by the death of the incumbent MP, Baidyanath Prasad Mahto.								

== Assembly segments wise lead of Parties ==
2019 Bihar Lok Sabha Elections Assembly Wise Leads Map

Party		Assembly segments
NDA	BJP	96
NDA	JD(U)	92
NDA	LJP	35
NDA	Total	223
MGB	RJD	9
MGB	INC	5
MGB	HAM(S)	2
MGB	CPI(ML)L	1
MGB	RLSP	1
MGB	Total	18
Others	AIMIM	2
Others	Total	2
Total		243
