= Kamal Singh (politician) =

Indian politician (1926–2020)

Kamal Bahadur Singh

Member of Parliament, Lok Sabha
- In office 1952–1957
- Preceded by: Constituency Established
- Succeeded by: Constituency Dissolved
- Constituency: Shahabad North West
- In office 1957–1962
- Preceded by: Constituency Established
- Succeeded by: Anant Prasad Sharma
- Constituency: Buxar

Personal details
- Born: 29 September 1926
- Died: 5 January 2020 (aged 93)
- Party: Independent
- Spouse(s): Usha Rani (d 1981) Phanindra Rajya Lakshmi (m. 1991; died 2020)
- Children: 3 (2 sons, and 1 daughter)

Kamal Bahadur Singh (29 September 1926 – 5 January 2020) was an Indian politician from Bihar. He was elected twice as a member of the Lok Sabha. He was the last Maharaja of Dumraon Raj. He was the last surviving member of the First Lok Sabha.

== Early life ==
Singh was born on 29 September 1926. He studied in Colonel Brown Cambridge School and D. A. V. College. He also studied in Allahabad University and Patna Law College.

== Career ==
Singh was elected as a member of the Lok Sabha from Shahabad North West in the first Lok Sabha election. Later, he was elected from Buxar in 1957. He was the youngest member elected, and served until 1962.

Singh also ran for office again in 1989 and 1991, but lost both times.

== Death ==
Singh died on 5 January 2020 at the age of 93.
