= Sudhakar Singh (Bihar politician) =

Indian politician

Member of Parliament, Lok Sabha
- Incumbent
- Assumed office 4 June 2024
- Preceded by: Ashwini Kumar Choubey
- Parliamentary group: Ministry of Commerce and Industry (India) Ministry of Agriculture and Farmers' Welfare
- Constituency: Buxar

Member of Bihar Legislative Assembly
- In office 10 November 2020 – 4 June 2024
- Preceded by: Ashok Kumar Singh
- Succeeded by: Ashok Kumar Singh
- Constituency: Ramgarh

Minister of Agriculture, Government of Bihar
- In office August 2022 – October 2022
- Preceded by: Amrendra Pratap Singh
- Succeeded by: Kumar Sarvjeet

Personal details
- Born: 2 January 1976 (age 50) Kaimur District, Bihar
- Party: RJD
- Other political affiliations: BJP
- Education: Bachelor of Arts, University of Delhi, 1995; gold medallist
- Occupation: Politician, Businessman, Agriculturist
- Website: www.sudhakarsingh.in

Sudhakar Singh was born into a politically active family in Kaimur district, Bihar, in 1976. He completed his secondary education from Senior Secondary, UP Board Allahabad (1992), and received a Bachelor of Arts degree from the University of Delhi in 1995.

His father, Jagdanand Singh, is a veteran RJD leader who served six consecutive terms as Member of Legislative Assembly MLA from Ramgarh constituency (1985–2009), represented Buxar in the 15th Lok Sabha (2009–14), and served as Bihar state president of the RJD from November 2019 to June 2025. Jagdanand Singh is a Rajput leader whose political base spans Kaimur and the Buxar-Rohtas belt. Sudhakar Singh has one brother, Ajit Singh.

In the 2024 Lok Sabha election, Singh won with 438,345. He defeated BJP's Mithlesh Tiwari by 30,091 votes.

== Early political career — Bharatiya Janata Party phase (2009–2014) ==
Following his father Jagdanand Singh's election to the Buxar Lok Sabha seat in 2009 — which vacated the Ramgarh assembly constituency that Jagdanand had held for six consecutive terms — Sudhakar Singh entered electoral politics.

The RJD ticket for the Ramgarh seat was allocated to Ambika Singh rather than Sudhakar, after which he joined the Bharatiya Janata Party.

Contesting the 2010 Bihar Legislative Assembly elections from Ramgarh on a BJP ticket, Singh lost. He remained with the BJP through the 2014 general election cycles.

== Return to Rashtriya Janata Dal and Bihar Legislative Assembly ==
Following his departure from the BJP, Singh joined the Rashtriya Janata Dal. He contested the 2020 Bihar Legislative Assembly elections from Ramgarh (Constituency No. 203, Kaimur district) on an RJD ticket and won, marking his first electoral victory. The Ramgarh seat falls within the Buxar Lok Sabha constituency and had previously been held by his father Jagdanand Singh for six consecutive terms between 1985 and 2009.

== Bihar agriculture minister (August–October 2022) ==
=== Appointment and context ===
Singh was inducted as Bihar agriculture minister in August 2022, following the formation of the Mahagathbandhan government — a coalition comprising the RJD, JD(U) under Chief Minister Nitish Kumar, the Indian National Congress, and Left parties.

=== Resignation ===
On October 2, 2022 — Gandhi Jayanti — Singh submitted his resignation to Deputy Chief Minister Tejashwi Yadav. Chief Minister Nitish Kumar accepted the resignation; the Agriculture portfolio was allocated to Kumar Sarvajeet, who had been serving as Tourism Minister, while Tejashwi Yadav assumed additional charge of Tourism.

Before his resignation, Singh had made public statements criticising the functioning of Bihar’s agriculture administration and the abolition of the Agricultural Produce Market Committee (APMC) Act in the state. He stated that the removal of the mandi system had adversely affected farmers in Bihar and described corruption within the agriculture department as widespread. In one such statement, Singh remarked that he himself was the “choron ka sardaar” (“head of the thieves”), referring to corruption in the department.

In a public statement Jagdanand Singh described his son's resignation as a sacrifice made in the interest of farmers, invoking the legacies of Mahatma Gandhi and Lal Bahadur Shastri, whose birth anniversaries fall on October 2. RJD sources indicated the resignation was intended to prevent a widening rift within the Mahagathbandhan coalition.

Singh was the second RJD minister to exit the cabinet within the same period.

== 2024 Lok Sabha election — Buxar ==
=== Candidacy and constituency context ===
Singh received the RJD ticket for the Buxar Lok Sabha constituency, which voted in Phase 6 of the 2024 Indian general election on June 1, 2024. The seat had been held by BJP's Ashwini Kumar Choubey for two consecutive terms (2014 and 2019). The BJP fielded Mithilesh Tiwari — previously associated with the Gopalganj constituency — as its candidate for 2024. The Buxar constituency encompasses Kaimur district and parts of Rohtas district, an economy largely dependent on agriculture, particularly paddy cultivation.

=== Result ===
Singh won the seat with 438,345 votes, representing 40.8% of votes polled. He defeated Mithilesh Tiwari (BJP), who received 408,254 votes (38%), by a margin of 30,091 votes. Fourteen candidates contested in total. Voter turnout was 54.45%. It was Singh's first victory in a Lok Sabha election.

=== Post-Election ===
At his maiden press conference following the result, Singh raised the issue of water availability in irrigation canals in Buxar, stating that the Bihar government had issued a circular mandating canal water release from June 1 but that no water had been released. He indicated his intention to raise issues relating to the Minimum Support Price for crops, the restoration of the mandi system, and irrigation infrastructure at the national level, and sought appointments with the Union Agriculture Minister and the Union Minister for Chemicals and Fertilizers.

== Parliamentary Performance — 18th Lok Sabha ==
Data: 24 June 2024 to 2 April 2026

Metric	Sudhakar Singh	National Average	Bihar Average
Attendance	95%	85%	89%
Debates participated	32	20.1	21.5
Questions asked	92	103	90
Private Member's Bills	0	0.4	0.6

Session attendance:

- Budget Session 2026: 89%
- Winter Session 2025: 100%
- Monsoon Session 2025: 100%
- Budget Session 2025: 96%
- Budget Session 2024 (18th LS): 100%
- First Session of 18th LS: 100%
- Winter Session 2024: 85%

== Parliamentary Committees ==
Singh has served as a member of the Standing Committee on Agriculture, Animal Husbandry and Food Processing (Lok Sabha) since 26 September 2024. His membership was renewed for a subsequent term beginning 26 September 2025 and remains current.

Committee	House	Status	Date From	Date To
Agriculture, Animal Husbandry and Food Processing	Lok Sabha	Member	26 Sep 2024	25 Sep 2025
Agriculture, Animal Husbandry and Food Processing	Lok Sabha	Member	26 Sep 2025	Incumbent

== Political positions and public advocacy ==
=== Mandi System and APMC Act ===
Singh has consistently called for the restoration of the Agricultural Produce Market Committee (APMC) Act in Bihar, which was abolished by the Nitish Kumar government in 2006. He has argued that the absence of a formal mandi regime has disadvantaged farmers by limiting access to regulated price discovery and procurement mechanisms. Bihar remains the only state in India to have abolished the APMC framework. Singh raised the issue publicly during his tenure as Agriculture Minister in 2022 and reiterated it following his election to the Lok Sabha in 2024.

=== Minimum Support Price ===
Singh advocates for a legally binding Minimum Support Price for agricultural produce. During the 2020–21 farmer protests at Delhi's borders, he organised a protest with farmers in Ramgarh in solidarity with the agitation.

=== Irrigation ===
Following his election to the Buxar seat, Singh raised the issue of inadequate canal water release in the constituency, noting that a Bihar government circular had mandated release from June 1 but had not been implemented. He has stated his intention to pursue the matter at the national level.

=== Departmental corruption ===
During his tenure as Bihar Agriculture Minister in 2022, Singh made public statements naming corruption within the agriculture department, including at the level of departmental officials. The statements preceded his resignation from the cabinet in October 2022.

== Electoral record ==
Year	Election	Constituency	Party	Result	Notes
2010	Bihar Legislative Assembly	Ramgarh	BJP	Lost	Father Jagdanand campaigned against him
2020	Bihar Legislative Assembly	Ramgarh	RJD	Won	First electoral victory
2024	Lok Sabha	Buxar	RJD	Won	438,345 votes; margin 30,091

Source: National Infomatics Centre - Digital Samsad
