= Jai Prakash Janta Dal =

Indian political party

The Jai Prakash Janta Dal (JPJD) is a political party in India based on the ideology of Jayaprakash Narayan popularly known as Lok Nayak who as an Indian Independence Activist, Social Reformer, Theorist and a Political Leader, deeply remembered for leading the mid-1970s opposition against PM Indira Gandhi. The primary motive of the party is to work for the welfare of the common citizens of India by providing them their constitutional rights, Jai Prakash Janta Dal aims to solve the fundamental issues of economical, social and political inequality along with the issues of underdevelopment, poverty and the discrimination prevailing in the society. The party has been registered by the Election Commission of India in the year 2002 and has been allotted the symbol of Diesel Pump. The JPJD is a right-wing party following the vision of JP.

As of 2013 Pankaj Sahay becomes the National President of the party with B.K. Singh as the guiding head of the party. In the 2014 general election, JPJD under the leadership of Pankaj Sahay, contested the Lok Sabha elections for the very first time and the party fought these elections on 7 Parliamentary Seats in Bihar and Jammu & Kashmir. The Party Headquarter is located at Pratap Nagar, Mayur Vihar Phase-1 in New Delhi.Pankaj sahay appointed Shri Ankit mehta as a state president for gujarat state. Ankit mehta is a well known film producer, social activist, businessman, and speaker.

== History ==
=== Formation ===
The party was founded in 2002, as four Members of the Bihar Legislative Assembly broke away from the Janata Dal (United). The four founding legislators were Laxmi Narayan Yadav, Jainandan Yadav, Vishwanath Singh and Sashi Kumar Rai, with Rai heading the legislative faction. The party supported the government of Rabri Devi. However, in 2004 the four legislators broke their links with the Devi government and merged back into JD(U). As of 2004 MP Jai Narain Prasad Nishad served as president of the party.

== Leadership ==
The party leadership went from Jai Narain Prasad Nishad to B.K. Singh in the year 2012. While in the year 2014 keeping the 16th Lok Sabha elections in mind, Pankaj Sahay was elected the National President of the Jai Prakash Janta Dal who is also the current Party President. He took the charge of the party in 2014 and had played a very prominent role in the expansion of the party across the nation and under his leadership the party contested the 2014 general election on 7 of the Parliamentary Seats in Bihar and Jammu & Kashmir, this was the first time when JPJD fought the Lok Sabha elections.

Pankaj Sahay had carried out several political campaigns for the party in the different States of India and associated many new members, social workers and youths with JPJD. He also gave the slogan of "Shanti Sadbhav Shamridhi" to the party.

== National Executive Meetings, 2025 & 2026 ==
In the year 2025, two major National Executive Meetings of Jai Prakash Janta Dal (JPJD) took place, in which the prime agendas were the expansion of the party across the country and to set up the Political Training Centers at every branch of the Party Office across India for youths and general citizens of the country to make their future in Politics. These agendas were laid down by the Party's President, Pankaj Sahay in the meeting.

The second National Executive Meet of the party took place in which the prime agendas were Election of the Party's National President and Formation of the Party's National Council. For the post of the Party's National President, party's face Pankaj Sahay was nominated and he was re-appointed as the National President of the party with a complete mandate to his name by the party leaders. Moreover, the newly appointed National President Pankaj Sahay proposed the creation of party's National Council soon after holding his post which got too constituted in this meet and the Party's Former President, B.K. Singh was appointed as the head of the National Council by Party's Current National President, Pankaj Sahay.

While in the year 2026, headed by National President, Shri Pankaj Sahay again two major National Executive Meetings of Jai Prakash Janta Dal (JPJD) took place, in which the prime agendas were the formation of the Central Working Committee (CWC) and the formation of Central Disciplinary Committee (CDC). Also, the top party leaders including Dr. Poonam Singh (General Secretary), Shri Ram Prakash Aggarwal (Party Vice President), Shri Alok Pallai (National Secretary, Legal) and Shri Anil Tomar (National Youth President) were present in these executive meetings.
