= Chhedi Lal Ram =

Indian politician from Bihar

Chhedi Lal Ram (Hindi: छेदीलाल राम) is an Indian politician from Bihar, who served as a Member of the Legislative Assembly (MLA) for the Rajpur Assembly constituency in Buxar Loksabha. He held the seat in the 2000 Bihar Legislative Assembly election.

== Personal life ==
Chhedi Ram has been associated with the Rashtriya Janata Dal (RJD) and served as a minister in the Bihar government. His political and agricultural background roots him firmly in regional politics.

== Political profile ==
He also participated in the 2020 Bihar Vidhan Sabha elections from the Rajpur (SC) constituency as an Independent candidate. He held the position of an MLA, and at some point during his tenure or afterward, he also served as a minister in the Bihar government, earning the title of “former minister”

His declared profession was politics and agriculture, and his assets were estimated at ₹37.9 lakhs, with no recorded criminal cases.

== Recent developments ==
In August 2025, Chhedi Ram and his son Rakesh Kumar Ram formally joined the Indian National Congress during a public event held at Sadakat Ashram.
