= Ramgarh, Bihar Assembly constituency =

- Constituency No. 203 for the Bihar Legislative Assembly

Constituency details
- Country: India
- Region: East India
- State: Bihar
- District: Kaimur
- Established: 1951
- Total electors: 286,876

Member of Legislative Assembly
- 18th Bihar Legislative Assembly
- Incumbent Satish Kumar Singh Yadav
- Party: BSP
- Alliance: None
- Elected year: 2025

Ramgarh Assembly constituency is one of 243 constituencies of legislative assembly of Bihar. It comes under Buxar Lok Sabha constituency.

== Overview ==
Ramgarh comprises community blocks of Ramgarh, Nuaon & Durgawati.

== Members of the Legislative Assembly ==
Year	Member	Party
1952	Dular Chand Ram	Indian National Congress
1957	Dasrath Tewari	Praja Socialist Party
1962	Viswanath Rai	Indian National Congress
1967	Sachchidanand Singh	Samyukta Socialist Party
1969	Viswanath Rai	Indian National Congress
1972	Sachchidanand Singh	Samyukta Socialist Party
1977	Sachchidanand Singh	Janata Party
1980	Prabhavati Singh	Indian National Congress
1985	Jagada Nand Singh	Lokdal
1990	Jagada Nand Singh	Janata Dal
1995	Jagada Nand Singh	Janata Dal
2000	Jagada Nand Singh	Rashtriya Janata Dal
2005	Jagada Nand Singh	Rashtriya Janata Dal
2005	Jagada Nand Singh	Rashtriya Janata Dal
2009^	Ambika Yadav	Rashtriya Janata Dal
2010	Ambika Yadav	Rashtriya Janata Dal
2015	Ashok Kumar Singh	Bharatiya Janata Party
2020	Sudhakar Singh	Rashtriya Janata Dal
2024^	Ashok Kumar Singh	Bharatiya Janata Party
2025	Satish Kumar Singh	Bahujan Samaj Party

^by-election

== Election results ==
=== 2025 ===
2025 Bihar Legislative Assembly election: Ramgarh
Party	Candidate	Votes	%	±%
BSP	Satish Kumar Singh	72,689	37.31	+5.01
BJP	Ashok Kumar Singh	72,659	37.29	+6.0
RJD	Ajit Singh	41,480	21.29	−11.11
JSP	Anand Kumar Singh	4,426	2.27	
SBSP	Ghurelal Rajbhar	1,779	0.91	
NOTA	None of the above	1,154	0.59	−0.54
Majority		30	0.02	−0.08
Turnout		194,844	67.92	+3.79
BSP gain from BJP		Swing		

=== 2024 bypoll ===
Bihar Legislative Assembly by-election 2024: Ramgarh
Party	Candidate	Votes	%	±%
BJP	Ashok Kumar Singh	62,179	36.99	+5.7
BSP	Satish Kumar Singh	60,895	36.18	+3.88
RJD	Ajit Kumar Singh	35,825	21.28	−11.12
JSP	Sushil Kumar Singh	6513	3.87	
NOTA	None of the Above	1,287	0.76	
Majority		1,362	0.81	
Turnout		168,320		
BJP gain from RJD		Swing		

=== 2020 ===
2020 Bihar Legislative Assembly election: Ramgarh
Party	Candidate	Votes	%	±%
RJD	Sudhakar Singh	58,083	32.4	+0.39
BSP	Ambika Singh	57,894	32.3	+9.14
BJP	Ashok Kumar Singh	56,084	31.29	−5.91
NOTA	None of the above	2,019	1.13	−0.21
Majority		189	0.1	−5.09
Turnout		179,266	64.13	+3.89
RJD gain from BJP		Swing		

=== 2015 ===
2015 Bihar Legislative Assembly election: Ramgarh
Party	Candidate	Votes	%	±%
BJP	Ashok Kumar Singh	57,501	37.2	
RJD	Ambika Yadav	49,490	32.01	
BSP	Pramod Singh	35,796	23.16	
Jai Hind Samaj Party	Hari Narayan Bind	3,641	2.36	
SP	Yogendra Singh	1,407	0.91	
NOTA	None of the above	2,067	1.34	
Majority		8,011	5.19	
Turnout		154,592	60.24	
BJP gain from RJD		Swing		

=== 2010 ===
2010 Bihar Legislative Assembly election: Ramgarh
Party	Candidate	Votes	%	±%
RJD	Ambika Yadav	30,787	25.0	
Independent	Ashok Kumar Singh	27,809	22.6	
BJP	Sudhakar Singh	18,551	15.1	
Majority		2,978	2.4	
Turnout		123,219	60.4	
