= Nuaon =

Nuaon Noawan
- Village
- Location in Bihar, India Nuaon (India)
- Coordinates: 25.36548°N 83.73929°E
- Country: India
- State: Bihar
- District: Kaimur

Area
  - Total: 1.78 km^{2} (0.69 sq mi)
- Elevation: 73 m (240 ft)

Population (2011)
  - Total: 5,292
  - Density: 2,970/km^{2} (7,700/sq mi)

Languages
  - Official: Bhojpuri, Hindi
- Time zone: UTC+5:30 (IST)

Nuaon, also spelled Noawan or Noan, is a village and corresponding community development block in Kaimur district of Bihar, India. As of 2011, its population was 5,292, in 798 households, while the overall block population was 106,530, in 15,263 households.

== Demographics ==
The 2011 Census of India reported that Nuaon block's sex ratio was 905 females to every 1000 males, which was the lowest among Kaimur district's CD blocks (the district average was 920). The sex ratio in the 0-6 age group was somewhat higher, at 945, which was slightly higher than the district average of 943. Members of scheduled castes made up 19.75% of the block's population, and members of scheduled tribes made up 0.48%. The literacy rate in Nuaon block was 70.55% (80.61% among males and 59.33% among females).

Most of Nuaon block's workforce was employed in agriculture in 2011, with 27.74% of workers being cultivators who owned or leased their own land and another 48.07% being agricultural labourers who worked someone else's land for money. 5.10% were counted as household industry workers, and the remaining 19.09% were other workers. The workforce of Nuaon block that year was mostly male, consisting of 25,176 males and 9,795 females.

== Villages ==
Nuaon block contains the following 92 villages:

Village name	Total land area (hectares)	Population (in 2011)
Tira	231	3,487
Akhani	418	4,954
Jujharpur	164	642
Mahro	52	516
Chintamanpur	103	964
Taraitha	385	2,937
Pira Ghat	230	145
Hemrajpur	30	0
Surajpura	203	1,207
Kusumpur	39	0
Basanpur	98	199
Mapatpur	134	1,080
Bhoganpur	45	299
Garra	217	2,133
Gaira	90	1,221
Mahartha	197	1,823
Belahri	217	90
Akolhi	295	2,576
Kariram	146	1,519
Jaitpura	321	2,204
Bararhi	130	486
Chhata Bararhi	220	1,873
Pajrawan	553	4,546
Rampur	49	248
Baddha	193	2,620
Partabpur	85	906
Noawan (block headquarters)	178	5,292
Khudra	176	2,081
Gorsara	190	2,050
Fatehpur	126	0
Chaprang	93	2,630
Nakta Ghat	25	0
Ewati English	36	0
Bhatwalia	58	441
Deuria	295	2,162
Paranpur	176	0
Bhupatpur	46	0
Ewati Bhopatpur	81	41
Goriari	25	253
Ewati	274	5,051
Sarae Bala	195	0
Jaruman English	28	0
Sonbarsa	132	837
Sotwa	172	909
Morath	694	2,282
Mahila	167	1,488
Pariari	467	1,982
Konahra	113	1,199
Rampur	133	169
Khairanti	121	717
Chandes	32	0
Harakhpur Chandes	180	0
Chandes	413	3,243
Kamhari	156	2,119
Sagra	87	398
Banbahuara	340	1,583
Parmanandpur	47	0
Dumduma	889	3,601
Kurhani	110	1,540
Guria	87	450
Mukhrawan	1,354	7,245
Lahang Patti	66	437
Kathaunra	54	513
Ramkarpur	83	0
Madhopur	24	0
Bhatpurwa	51	732
Kota Hissa Safdar Ali Khan	257	1,843
Kota Hissa	242	1,764
Kota Jadunath Singh	134	0
Kota	57	0
Chaubepur	34	733
Chintamanpur	20	0
Gaura	105	846
Karamhari	498	1,154
Parasia	342	1,050
Rasanandpur	53	0
Bhaluhari	45	0
Darabpur	59	0
Hemrajpur	56	0
Dungurpura	66	372
Sarbasipur	43	142
Kanhua	205	740
Rashidpur	18	0
Ruhiya	57	470
Darauli	237	1,975
Shahpur	34	0
Musia	45	913
Parsotimpur	80	731
Belarhi	138	1,355
Chandraui	102	460
Gai Chakl	72	80
Baruna	62	1,782
