= Pranpur Assembly constituency =

Coordinates: 25°22′21″N 87°42′02″E

Pranpur
- Constituency No. 66 for the Bihar Legislative Assembly

Constituency details
- Country: India
- Region: East India
- State: Bihar
- District: Katihar
- Established: 1977
- Total electors: 313,606
- Reservation: None

Member of Legislative Assembly
- 18th Bihar Legislative Assembly
- Incumbent Nisha Singh
- Party: BJP
- Alliance: NDA
- Elected year: 2025

Pranpur Assembly constituency is an assembly constituency in Katihar district in the Indian state of Bihar. Nisha Singh of Bharatiya Janata Party is the current Member of Legislative Assembly since 2020.

== Overview ==
As per Delimitation of Parliamentary and Assembly constituencies Order, 2008, No 66. Pranpur Assembly constituency is composed of the following: Pranpur and Azamnagar community development blocks.

Pranpur Assembly constituency is part of No 11 Katihar (Lok Sabha constituency).

== Members of the Legislative Assembly ==
Year	Name	Party
1977	Mahendra Narayan Yadav	Janata Party
1980	Mohammed Sakur	Indian National Congress
1985	Mangan Insan	Indian National Congress
1990	Mahendra Narayan Yadav	Janata Dal
1995	Mahendra Narayan Yadav	Janata Dal
2000	Binod Kumar Singh	Bharatiya Janata Party
2005	Mahendra Narayan Yadav	Rashtriya Janata Dal
2005	Mahendra Narayan Yadav	Rashtriya Janata Dal
2010	Binod Kumar Singh	Bharatiya Janata Party
2015	Binod Kumar Singh	Bharatiya Janata Party
2020	Nisha Singh	Bharatiya Janata Party
2025	Nisha Singh	Bharatiya Janata Party

== Election results ==
=== 2025 ===
2025 Bihar Legislative Assembly election: Pranpur
Party	Candidate	Votes	%	±%
BJP	Nisha Singh	108,565	42.65	+2.68
RJD	Ishrat Parween	100,813	39.61	
AIMIM	Md Aftab Alam	30,163	11.85	
JSP	Kunal Nishad	2,467	0.97	
NOTA	None of the above	3,313	1.3	−0.28
Majority		7,752	3.04	+1.55
Turnout		254,532	81.16	+15.7
BJP hold		Swing		

=== 2020 ===
2020 Bihar Legislative Assembly election: Pranpur
Party	Candidate	Votes	%	±%
BJP	Nisha Singh	79,974	39.97	+13.26
INC	Tauquir Alam	77,002	38.48	+16.38
Independent	Ishrat Parween	19,746	9.87	
Independent	Sudarshan Chandra Paul	5,888	2.94	−9.53
Independent	Kishor Mandal	3,603	1.8	
Independent	Ajay Singh	3,401	1.7	
BMP	Manoj Murmu	2,646	1.32	
NOTA	None of the above	3,168	1.58	+0.75
Majority		2,972	1.49	−3.03
Turnout		200,087	65.46	−2.86
BJP hold		Swing		

=== 2015 ===
2015 Bihar Legislative Assembly election: Pranpur
Party	Candidate	Votes	%	±%
BJP	Binod Kumar Singh	47,924	26.71	
NCP	Israt Parween	39,823	22.19	
INC	Tauquir Alam	39,653	22.1	
Independent	Sudarshan Chandra Paul	22,373	12.47	
Independent	Mahendra Narayan Yadav	3,164	1.76	
Independent	Azam	2,858	1.59	
Independent	Md Salauddin	2,197	1.22	
JDP	Sarkar Marandi	1,916	1.07	
JAP(L)	Shaiyad Alam	1,850	1.03	
NOTA	None of the above	1,487	0.83	
Majority		8,101	4.52	
Turnout		179,444	68.32	
BJP hold		Swing		
