= Tej Narayan Singh =

Indian politician

Member of Parliament, Lok Sabha
- In office 1989-1996
- Preceded by: Kamla Kant Tewary
- Succeeded by: Lalmuni Chaubey
- Constituency: Buxar, Bihar

Personal details
- Born: 18 December 1941 Gopinathpur, Bhojpur district, Bihar, British India
- Party: Communist Party of India
- Spouse: Panna Devi

Tej Narayan Singh Yadav also spelt Narain is an Indian politician. He was elected to the Lok Sabha, the lower house of the Parliament of India from Buxar, Bihar as a member of the Communist Party of India.
