= Vishwanath Ram =

Indian politician

MLA, Bihar Legislative Assembly
- In office 2020–2025
- Preceded by: Santosh Kumar Nirala
- Succeeded by: Santosh Kumar Nirala
- Constituency: Rajpur

Personal details
- Party: INC
- Occupation: Politics

Vishwanath Ram is an elected representative of the Rajpur, Bihar Assembly constituency of Buxar District. He is a member of Bihar Vidhansabha. Vishwanath contested the 2020 Bihar assembly election as a member of the Congress Party and defeated Santosh Kumar Nirala of JDU with a huge margin.
