= Raj Bhushan Choudhary =

Indian politician

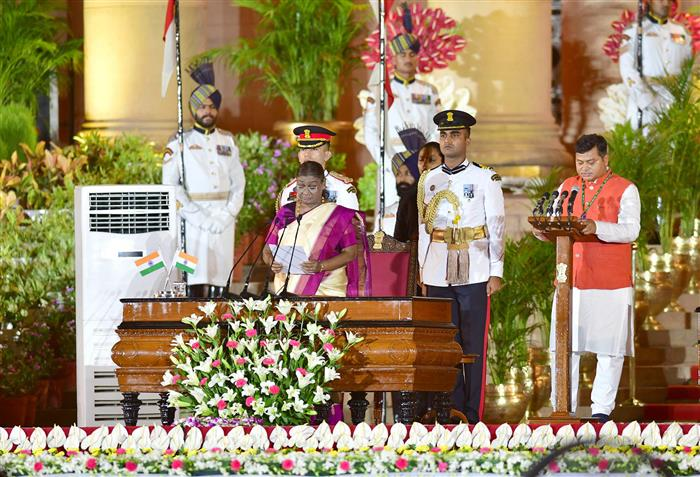
- The President of India Droupadi Murmu administering the oath as Minister of State in Ministry of Jal Shakti in third Narendra Modi ministry to Shri Raj Bhushan Choudhary at a Swearing-in Ceremony at Rashtrapati Bhavan, in New Delhi on 9 June 2024.

Minister of State in Ministry of Jal Shakti
- Incumbent
- Assumed office 11 June 2024
- Prime Minister: Narendra Modi
- Minister: C. R. Patil

Member of Parliament, Lok Sabha
- Incumbent
- Assumed office 4 June 2024
- Prime Minister: Narendra Modi
- Preceded by: Ajay Nishad
- Constituency: Muzaffarpur

Personal details
- Party: Bharatiya Janata Party
- Profession: Politician

Raj Bhushan Choudhary is an Indian politician and the Union Minister of state in Narendra Modi cabinet Government of India. He was elected in the 2024 General Election from Muzaffarpur Lok Sabha constituency. He is a member of the Bharatiya Janata Party.

== Political career ==
In Following the 2024 Indian general election, Raj Bhushan Choudhary wins from Muzaffarpur seat by defeating Ajay Nishad (INC) by a margin of 2,34,936 votes.

== See also ==
- 18th Lok Sabha
- Third Modi ministry
