= Digvijay Narain Singh =

Indian politician

Digvijay Narain Singh (1924 – 2 August 1991) was an Indian politician who served as a Member of Parliament. He started his career as a member of the Indian National Congress, later joining Morarji Desai's NCO faction in 1969, and then the Janata Party. He represented Pupri, Muzaffarpur, Hajipur, Vaishali et al. seats from Bihar in Lok Sabha from 1952 well into 1970s. He joined Janata Party in 1977 and was elected to Lok Sabha from Vaishali (Lok Sabha constituency).

He was in Lok Sabha for 28 consecutive years (1952–1980). He represented Muzaffarpur from 1952 to 1957 and again from 1962 to 1971, Pupri from 1957 to 1962, Hajipur constituency from 1971 to 1977, and Vaishali from 1977 to 1980. He lost from Muzaffarpur in 1980 as Janata Party's candidate against the winner George Fernandes of Janata Party (Socialist).

He was born in a Bhumihar family and was a scion of Dharhara, one of the richest Zamindaris in Bihar. But he spent a lot of his inherited wealth for public good and never took any money from his party, the Indian National Congress for fighting elections. He was a close friend of Sir Mark Tully, who contributed one whole chapter on him in No Full Stops in India. He was close friend of both Feroze Gandhi and Indira Gandhi and Morarji Desai treated him like his son. He died at Patna on 2 August 1991 at the age of 67. He donated 500 acres of his land to establish Langat Singh College, Now known as BR Ambedkar University, Muzaffarpur of Bihar. He served as secretary of Bihar Congress in 1950.
