= Buxar Lok Sabha constituency =

Lok Sabha constituency in Bihar

Coordinates: 25.6°N 84.0°E

Buxar
- Lok Sabha constituency

Constituency details
- Country: India
- Region: East India
- State: Bihar
- Assembly constituencies: Brahampur; Buxar; Dumraon; Rajpur; Ramgarh; Dinara
- Established: 1957
- Reservation: None

Member of Parliament
- 18th Lok Sabha
- Incumbent Sudhakar Singh
- Party: RJD
- Alliance: INDIA
- Elected year: 2024
- Preceded by: Ashwini Choubey BJP

Buxar Lok Sabha constituency is one of the 40 Lok Sabha (parliamentary) constituencies in Bihar state in eastern India.

== Assembly segments ==
Presently, Buxar Lok Sabha constituency comprises the following six legislative assembly segments:

#	Name	District	Member	Party	2024 lead
199	Brahampur	Buxar	Shambhu Nath Yadav	RJD	RJD
200	Buxar	Buxar	Anand Mishra	BJP	RJD
201	Dumraon	Buxar	Rahul Kumar Singh	JD(U)	RJD
202	Rajpur (SC)	Buxar	Santosh Kumar Nirala	JD(U)	RJD
203	Ramgarh	Kaimur	Satish Kumar Singh Yadav	BSP	RJD
210	Dinara	Rohtas	Alok Kumar Singh	RLM	BJP

== Members of Parliament ==
=== 1952-1957 ===
As Shahabad North-West Lok Sabha constituency in 1st Lok Sabha.

Year	Name	Party
1952	Kamal Singh	Independent

=== 1957-Present ===
As present day Buxar Lok Sabha constituency from 2nd Lok Sabha onwards.The following is the list of the Members of Parliament elected from this constituency

Year	Name	Party
1957	Kamal Singh	Independent
1962	Anant Sharma	Indian National Congress
1967	Ram Subhag Singh	Indian National Congress
1971	Anant Sharma	Indian National Congress
1977	Ramanand Tiwary	Janata Party
1980	Kamla Kant Tiwari	Indian National Congress
1984	Kamla Kant Tiwari	Indian National Congress
1989	Tej Narayan Singh	Communist Party of India
1991	Tej Narayan Singh	Communist Party of India
1996	Lalmuni Chaubey	Bharatiya Janata Party
1998	Lalmuni Chaubey	Bharatiya Janata Party
1999	Lalmuni Chaubey	Bharatiya Janata Party
2004	Lalmuni Chaubey	Bharatiya Janata Party
2009	Jagada Nand Singh	Rashtriya Janata Dal
2014	Ashwini Choubey	Bharatiya Janata Party
2019	Ashwini Choubey	Bharatiya Janata Party
2024	Sudhakar Singh	Rashtriya Janata Dal

== Election results ==
Vote share of winning candidates
2024	40.82%
2019	47.94%
2014	35.88%

=== 2024 ===
2024 Indian general elections: Buxar
Party	Candidate	Votes	%	±%
RJD	Sudhakar Singh	438,345	40.82	▲4.80
BJP	Mithlesh Tiwari	4,08,254	38.02	▼9.92
BSP	Anil Kumar	1,14,714	10.68	▲2.55
NOTA	None of the Above	9,617	0.90	▼0.77
Majority		30,091		
Turnout		10,74,086	55.53	
RJD gain from BJP		Swing		

=== 2019 ===
2019 Indian general elections: Buxar
Party	Candidate	Votes	%	±%
BJP	Ashwani Kumar Choubey	473,053	47.94	+12.06
RJD	Jagada Nand Singh	3,55,444	36.02	+15.03
BSP	Sushil Kumar Singh	80,261	8.13	−12.65
NOTA	None of the Above	16,447	1.67	
Majority		1,17,609	11.92	
Turnout		9,86,962	53.95	
BJP hold		Swing		

=== 2014 ===
2014 Indian general elections: Buxar
Party	Candidate	Votes	%	±%
BJP	Ashwani Kumar Choubey	319,012	35.88	
RJD	Jagada Nand Singh	1,86,674	20.99	
BSP	Dadan Singh Yadav	1,84,788	20.78	
JD(U)	Shyam Lal Singh Kushwaha	1,17,012	13.16	
NOTA	None of the Above	9,179	1.03	
Majority		1,32,338		
Turnout		8,88,204	54.14	
BJP gain from RJD		Swing		

=== 2009 ===
2009 Indian general election: Buxar
Party	Candidate	Votes	%	±%
RJD	Jagada Nand Singh	132,614	21.27	
BJP	Lal Muni Choubey	130,376	20.91	
BSP	Shyam Lal Singh Kushwaha	127,145	20.39	
Independent	Dadan Singh	122,975	19.72	
INC	Kamla Kant Tiwary	22,780	3.65	
CPI(ML)L	Sudama Prasad	19,459	3.12	
Independent	9 Independent Candidates	26,333	4.22	
Others	7 Other Party Candidates	41,933	6.72	
Majority		2,238	0.36	
Turnout				
Swing to RJD from BJP		Swing		

=== 2004 ===
2004 Indian general election: Buxar
Party	Candidate	Votes	%	±%
BJP	Lalmuni Chaubey	205,980	31.73	
Independent	Dadan Singh	151,114	23.28	
RJD	Shivanand Tiwary	133,467	20.56	
BSP	Shiv Kumar Singh Kushwaha	75,309	11.60	
CPI(ML)L	Shushila Devi	32,807	5.05	
SBSP	Ram Ekbal Chaudhari	16,639	2.56	
CPI	Tej Narayan Singh	11,669	1.80	
SP	Ranjit Singh	10,378	1.60	
Independent	Satendra Singh	6,831	1.05	
Independent	Bisheshwar Pandey	2,973	0.46	
Independent	Lalsa Devi	1,991	0.31	
Majority		54,866	8.45	
Turnout				
Swing to BJP from Independent		Swing		

=== 1999 ===
1999 Indian general election: Buxar
Party	Candidate	Votes	%	±%
BJP	Lal Muni Choubey	235,968	39.15	
RJD	Shivanand Tiwary	224,362	37.22	
CPI	Tej Narayan Singh	67,916	11.27	
CPI(ML)L	Mitranand Singh	36,385	6.04	
BSP	Sobh Nath Ram Anokha	32,957	5.47	
SS	Dinanath Pandey	3,650	0.61	
SJP(R)	Vijay Singh	1,511	0.25	
Majority		11,606	1.93	
Turnout		609,414	59.20	
Swing to BJP from RJD		Swing		

=== 1998 ===
1998 Indian general election: Buxar
Party	Candidate	Votes	%	±%
BJP	Lalmuni Chaubey	266,961	41.05	
RJD	Udai Pratap Singh	182,645	28.09	
CPI	Tej Narain Singh	93,265	14.34	
CPI(ML)L	Rajesh Singh	49,758	7.65	
BSP	Mahabali Singh	48,247	7.42	
INC	Vijay Shankar Mishra	8,389	1.29	
Independent	Nandjee Singh	1,036	0.16	
Majority		84,316	12.96	
Turnout		657,755	64.07	
Swing to BJP from RJD		Swing		

=== 1996 ===
1996 Indian general election: Buxar
Party	Candidate	Votes	%	±%
BJP	Lal Muni Choubey	265,427	45.34	
CPI	Tej Narain Singh	201,663	34.45	
CPI(ML)L	Suresh Mehta	61,148	10.44	
BSP	Janardan Singh	22,753	3.89	
BKUS	Ranjit Singh	7,838	1.34	
INC	Shyam Bihari Mishra	7,028	1.20	
JP	Dayanand Upadhyay	609	0.10	
AIIC(T)	Sarayu Upadhya	494	0.08	
Independent	25 Independent Candidates	18,478	3.14	
Majority		63,764	10.89	
Turnout				
Swing to BJP from CPI		Swing		

=== 1991 ===
1991 Indian general election: Buxar
Party	Candidate	Votes	%	±%
CPI	Tej Narain Singh	234,088	41.44	
BJP	Kamal Singh	168,088	29.75	
INC	Kamla Kant Tewari	116,747	20.67	
IPF	Madan Pal	28,971	5.13	
BSP	Ganpati Mandal	4,940	0.87	
JP	Surya Kumar Yadav	1,516	0.27	
Independent	14 Independent Candidates	7,396	1.31	
Others	5 Other Party Candidates	3,187	0.57	
Majority		66,000	11.69	
Turnout				
Swing to CPI from BJP		Swing		

=== 1989 ===
1989 Indian general election: Buxar
Party	Candidate	Votes	%	±%
CPI	Tej Narain Singh	212,596	38.89	
BJP	Kamal Singh	175,274	32.06	
INC	Kamal Kant Tiwary	140,641	25.73	
Independent	11 Independent Candidates	9,913	1.82	
Others	5 Other Party Candidates	8,244	1.51	
Majority		37,322	6.83	
Turnout				
Swing to CPI from BJP		Swing		

=== 1984 ===
1984 Indian general election: Buxar
Party	Candidate	Votes	%	±%
INC	Kamla Kant Tiwari	207,732	46.26	
CPI	Tej Narayan Singh	152,030	33.86	
BJP	Lal Muni Chaubey	57,407	12.78	
LKD	Surya Narayan Sharma	21,012	4.68	
Independent	Deo Muni Roy	3,997	0.89	
Independent	Rajeshwar Roy	2,728	0.61	
Independent	Ganesh Pd. Keshari	2,150	0.48	
Independent	Lalan Ram	1,979	0.44	
Majority		55,702	12.40	
Turnout		456,203	51.78	
Swing to INC from CPI		Swing		

=== 1980 ===
1980 Indian general election: Buxar
Party	Candidate	Votes	%	±%
INC(I)	K. K. Tiwari	133,999	37.82	
CPI	Suraj Prasad	102,275	28.87	
JP	Rama Nand Tiwari	88,224	24.90	
BSP	Barma Nand Yadav	1,701	0.48	
Independent	16 Independent Candidates	28,087	7.92	
Majority		31,724	8.95	
Turnout				
Swing to INC(I) from CPI		Swing		

=== 1977 ===
1977 Indian general election: Buxar
Party	Candidate	Votes	%	±%
JP	Rama Nand Tiwary	286,418	65.04	
INC	Anant Prasad Sharma	82,705	18.78	
CPI	Suraj Prasad	59,612	13.54	
Independent	Mohan Singh	8,300	1.88	
Independent	Sheo Nath Pandey	1,865	0.42	
Independent	Kedar Nath Mishra	1,450	0.33	
Majority		203,713	46.26	
Turnout		446,815	63.38	
Swing to JP from INC		Swing		

=== 1971 ===
1971 Indian general election: Buxar
Party	Candidate	Votes	%	±%
INC	Anant Prasad Sharma	112,541	39.34	
INC(O)	Ram Subhag Singh	82,477	28.83	
CPI	Suraj Prasad Singh	49,403	17.27	
SSP	Ram Awadhesh Singh	19,825	6.93	
Jharkhand Party	Kamla Jahanawi	2,236	0.78	
Independent	8 Independent Candidates	19,581	6.85	
Majority		30,064	10.51	
Turnout				
Swing to INC from INC(O)		Swing		

== See also ==
- Buxar district
- List of constituencies of the Lok Sabha

Lok Sabha
New title creation	Constituency represented by the leader of the opposition 1969 – 1970	Vacant till 1977; No Official opposition Title next held by Satara
