= Bind (caste) =

Indian caste

- Religions: Hinduism
- Languages: Hindi, Bhojpuri, Angika, Magahi
- Populated states: Majority: Bihar; Uttar Pradesh; West Bengal; Minority: Maharashtra, Madhya Pradesh; Gujarat/Assam
- Region: Eastern India; Central India; North India
- Notable members: Brij Kishor Bind, Bina Devi
- Related groups: Noniya, Beldar

The Bind are a caste found in the Indian states of Uttar Pradesh, Bihar, Madhya Pradesh, Assam, West Bengal, Chhattisgarh and Tripura. Binds are included in the Other Backward Class list in many states. Bind is one of the Jaliya communities. In Uttar Pradesh, they are known by the Jaliya sub-caste. In Bihar Bin/Bind comes under OBC.

As per the caste-based census data release by Bihar government, there are 12,85,358 Binds (0.9833% of population of Bihar)

== History and origin ==
According to Herbert Hope Risley, the early settlement of Bind community was on the foothill of Vindhya Range of central India

On the origins of Bind Risley said:

Bind is a large non-Aryan caste of Bihar in upper India, employed in agriculture, earthwork, fishing, hunting, making saltpetre, and collecting indigenous drugs. Traditions current among the caste profess to trace their origin to the Vindhya Hills of Central India; and one of these legends tells how a traveller passing by the foot of the hills heard a strange flute-like sound coming out of a clump of bamboos. He cut a shoot and took from it a fleshy substance, which afterwards grew into a man, the supposed ancestor of the Binds. The myth seems to be of a totemistic character, but other traces of totemism are not forthcoming. Another story says that the Binds and Nunias were formerly all Binds, and that the present Nunias are the descendants of a Bind who consented to dig a grave for a Mohammedan king and was outcast for doing so.

... It seems not improbable that the Binds may be a true aboriginal tribe, and the Nunias a functional group differentiated by taking to the manufacture of earth-salt. But this is mainly a conjecture.

Another story mentioned in the book Karatoya

There is a popular belief among the people of Bind community t hat in the ancient past a Kshatriya king called Kartavirya Arjuna or Sahasrabahu Arjun of Haihay dynasty ruled the earth. The subject became helpless of his anarchy. He was a powerful king and great warrior. One day, the king went out for hunting with his army. In spite of spending three days in the forest, he hardly got any animal to hunt. The tired, hungry, and thirsty king took shelter to a sage's Ashrama when he was returning to his capital. The sage pleased the king with his hospitality within very short time. When the curious king asked the sage how he managed everything so early, the sage told the story of the mysterious cow named Suravi. The king then tried to forcefully take the mysterious cow. A clash broke out between the king and the sage. The king destroyed all the trees of the ashrama and dishonoured the sage. Then Parashurama, the son of the sage, Jamadeagni and Renuka became angry and killed the king. Later, the sons of the king found the sage along at his ashrama and killed him. Parashuram was shocked and angry, and he committed to free the earth from Kshatriyas. He eliminated Kshatriyas for 21 times. According to the traditional myth, some Kshatriyas took shelter of a den in the Vindhya(also pronounced as Bindya) hill to avoid their elimination. In course of time, these people came out and began to settle in Deccan, Chotanagpur plateau, and Bengal. The term Bind came from mountain Vindhya.

=== Surnames ===
People of this cast have various surnames usually depending on which part of country they are from. They use 'Maḏar'(मड़र), 'Mandal', 'Mondol', 'Prasad', 'Prasad Singh', 'Singh', 'Chauhan', 'Bind'. Women usually have 'Devi' in their surname if they don't use their husbands surname.

== Marriage ==
The marriage ceremony of the Binds is very close to orthodox Hindu ritual. After the first negotiations have passed between the parents of the bride and bridegroom, the headman (manjan) and the caste council (panchayat) are consulted on the important question of prohibited degrees. This being settled, the next step is ghardekhai, an exchange of visits, at which the bridegroom's people see the bride, and vice versa. In the course of the ghardekhai a date is fixed for tilak when the bride's relatives come to the bridegroom's house and present to him a rupee, a new cloth, some cooking utensils, some betel leaves and areca-nut, and fix in the presence of the headman and some representatives of the caste council an auspicious date for the celebration of the marriage. The ceremony is described in detail in Chapter III. SPECIAL WEDDING CEREMONIES AMONGST THE HINDUS.

== Present circumstances ==
The Bind are among 17 Other Backwards Class communities that have been proposed for Scheduled Caste status by the Samajwadi Party-controlled Government of Uttar Pradesh. However, this proposal, which relates to votebank politics and has been made in the past, has been stayed by the courts; a prior attempt was also rejected by the centre.

The Bind have a traditional caste council and, like other occupational castes, maintain strict social control over members. They are Hindu, and customs similar to other similar groupings such as the Kewat. They are concentrated in eastern Uttar Pradesh, and speak Bhojpuri and Maithili.

In Bihar, the Jethaut are mainly engaged in fishing, well sinking and basket making, while the Kharaut are mainly farmers. They speak the Maithili.

== Controversies ==
BJP leader and Bihar's Mines and Geology Minister Brij Kishor Bind stirred a controversy by claiming that Lord Shiva is from the Bind caste and that it is mentioned in Shiva Puran. The function was organized by Noniya, Bind, Beldar Mahasangh.

== Diaspora ==
A diaspora community, also known as the Been, can be found in Srimangal in Sylhet Division, Bangladesh. As of the 2011 census, their population was estimated to be 5,000. They were transported to this region in the nineteenth century during the British Raj in order to work as tea garden labourers. They are identified as a Hindi-speaking Hindu community. Many have adopted the Bengali language; although only 10% of the Been community are actually literate in the language.

== Notable people ==
- Brij Kishor Bind was the former cabinet minister of Mines, Geology, Backward and EBC Welfare department in the Government of Bihar.
- Smt. Bina Devi famously known as Mushroom Mahila was awarded with Nari Shakti Puraskar by President Ram Nath Kovind.
