= Ashwini Kumar Choubey =

Indian politician

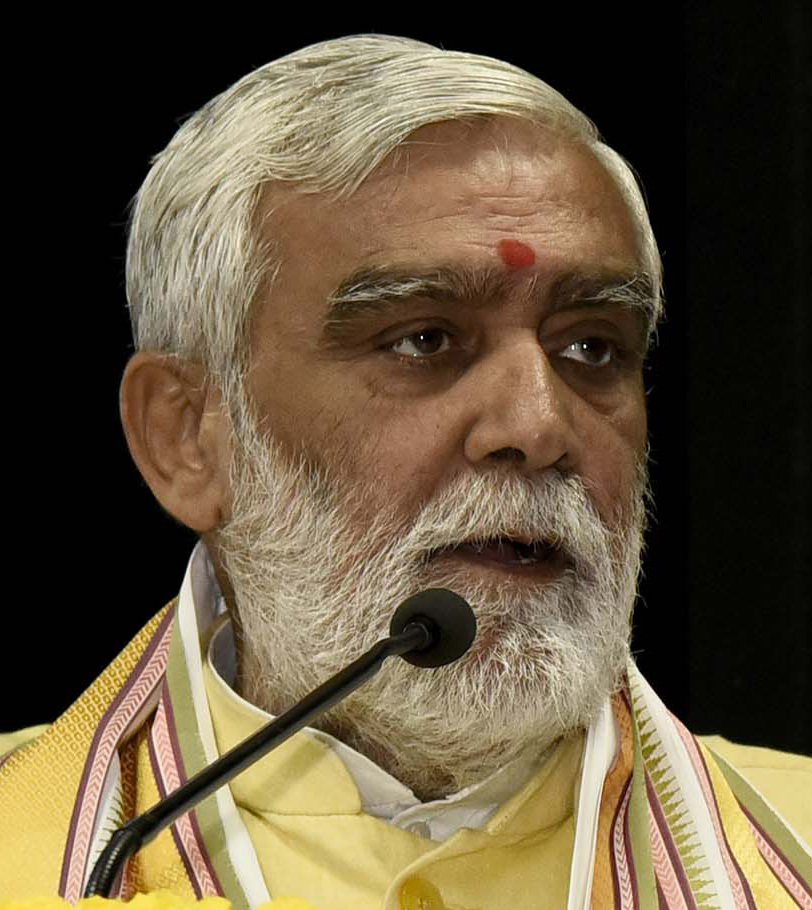

Minister of State Government of India
- In office 3 September 2017 – 9 June 2024
- Ministry: Term
- Minister of Consumer Affairs, Food & Public Distribution: 7 July 2021 - 11 June 2024
- Minister of Environment, Forest & Climate Change: 7 July 2021 - 11 June 2024
- Minister of Health & Family Welfare: 3 September 2017 - 7 July 2021

Member of Parliament, Lok Sabha
- In office 16 May 2014 – 4 June 2024
- Preceded by: Jagada Nand Singh
- Succeeded by: Sudhakar Singh
- Constituency: Buxar

Minister of Health & Family Welfare Government of Bihar
- In office 26 November 2010 – 16 June 2013
- Chief Minister: Nitish Kumar
- Preceded by: Nand Kishore Yadav

Minister of Public Health Engineering Department Government of Bihar
- In office 13 April 2008 – 26 November 2010
- Chief Minister: Nitish Kumar
- Preceded by: Prem Kumar
- Succeeded by: Chandra Mohan Rai

Minister of Urban Development & Housing Government of Bihar
- In office 24 November 2005 – 13 April 2008
- Chief Minister: Nitish Kumar
- Succeeded by: Bhola Singh

Member of Bihar Legislative Assembly
- In office 1995–2014
- Preceded by: Vijoy Kumar Mitra
- Succeeded by: Ajeet Sharma
- Constituency: Bhagalpur

Personal details
- Born: 2 January 1953 (age 73) Bhagalpur, Bihar, India
- Party: Bharatiya Janata Party
- Spouse: Neeta Choubey
- Children: Arjit Shashwat Choubey & Aviral Shashwat Choubey
- Parents: Late Sahdeo Prasad Choubey (father); Late Sudevi Devi (mother)
- Education: Patna University
- Profession: Social Worker & Politician
- Source: [Dariyapur, Bhagalpur]

Ashwini Kumar Choubey (born 2 January 1953) is an Indian politician belonging to the Bharatiya Janata Party who was the Minister of State for Consumer Affairs, Food and Public Distribution and Environment, Forest and Climate Change and a member of the 17th Lok Sabha. He is a member of the 16th Lok Sabha representing Buxar (Lok Sabha constituency) and a former health minister of Bihar. He had represented the Bihar legislative assembly from Bhagalpur (Vidhan Sabha constituency) before contesting the 16th Lok Sabha election. On 3 September 2017, he became in charge of office as Minister of State for Health in Narendra Modi's Government. He resigned in July 2021.

== Political career ==
Choubey is a politician from state of Bihar and elected to the Bihar Legislative Assembly for five consecutive terms. He was accredited to have built 11,000 toilets for minority and Below Poverty Line families under Swachh Bharat Mission. A slogan "Ghar-ghar Me ho Shouchalaya ka Nirman, Tabhi hoga Ladli Bitiya ka kanyadaan" given by him was a hit in Bihar and people from all castes and religions availed government provided subsidy to build toilets in their respective homes.

== Early career ==
Choubey has been associated with BJP for almost five decades and was earlier associated with Bharatiya Jana Sangh. In his earlier stint, he was the health minister in the Nitish Kumar cabinet in 2012.

He authored a book "Kedarnath Trasadi" based on the 2013 deluge in Uttarakhand where he got stranded with his family. He and his family managed to take shelter in the Kedarnath temple and were airlifted by a state government helicopter.

== Life ==
In May 2019, Choubey became the Minister of State for Health and Family Welfare.

Portfolio Held - NDA I (2005-2010) and NDA II (2010-2013) are Urban Development, PHED and Health care.

Member of Parliamentary Committee on Estimates, Standing Committee on Energy and the Environment, Consultative Committee on Health and Family Welfare and Central Silk Board.

== Professional work ==
He was instrumental on digitisation of health services in the time of pandemic and had launched Digitised platform of Flagship Health Schemes on (NHA)’s IT platform. The whole process of delivery of healthcare services to eligible beneficiaries under national health scheme is made paper less.

Choubey had piloted medical mobile unit project under his constituency Buxar where the facility of tele-medicine, pathological tests and online medical consultation was facilitated. The mobile unit is named 'Aarogya wahan' and it is piloted in all constituencies in Buxar.

Choubey ministry has provisioned and had exceeded the quota of Remdesivir injection to 2 Lakhs in the state of Bihar in May 2021.

In June 2019, Children in Bihar's Muzaffarpur and adjoining districts have been plagued with Acute Encephalitis Syndrome (AES) which has resulted in loss of lives. In order to address the growing concern, Union Health Minister Dr Harsh Vardhan called for a media briefing. There were reports that MoS Health and Family Welfare, Ashwini Kumar Choubey was sleeping during the same and later clarified that he was in deep thoughts during the crisis call.

On being questioned by the media, he said 'Main manan chintan bhi karta hoon na, main so nahi raha tha' (I contemplate also. I was not sleeping). In September 2019, Ashwini Choubey said that Cow Urine should be used in medicines and treatment of cancer, for which he was severely criticised for lack of scientific temper. He also pointed out that the former prime minister Morarji Desai used to consume cow urine as it cures various diseases.
