= Binod Singh Kushwaha =

Indian politician (died 2020)

Vinod Kumar Singh Kushwaha

Minister of BC & EBC Welfare Government of Bihar
- In office 2 June 2019 – 12 October 2020
- Chief Minister: Nitish Kumar
- Preceded by: Brij Kishor Bind
- Succeeded by: Renu Devi

Minister of Mines & Geology Government of Bihar
- In office 29 July 2017 – 2 June 2019
- Chief Minister: Nitish Kumar
- Preceded by: Muneshwar Chaudhary
- Succeeded by: Brij Kishor Bind

Member of Bihar Legislative Assembly
- In office 2010–2020
- Preceded by: Mahendra Narayan Yadav
- Succeeded by: Nisha Singh
- Constituency: Pranpur
- In office 2000–2005
- Preceded by: Mahendra Narayan Yadav
- Succeeded by: Mahendra Narayan Yadav
- Constituency: Pranpur

Personal details
- Died: 12 October 2020
- Party: Bharatiya Janata Party

Binod Kumar Singh also known as Binod Singh Kushwaha was an Indian politician associated with Bharatiya Janata Party. He was the Minister of Backward & Extremely Backward Classes Welfare at the time of his death. He represented Pranpur (Vidhan Sabha constituency) thrice in the 2000, 2010 and 2015 elections.

== Political career ==
Singh was considered as one of the stalwarts of Bhartiya Janata Party. He defeated Mahendra Narayan Yadav in the 2010 assembly elections to Bihar Legislative Assembly and in 2015, became victorious once again by defeating Ishrat Parveen of Nationalist Congress Party. In the early years of his political career, he was also associated with Akhil Bharatiya Vidyarthi Parishad, the student wing of Rashtriya Swayamsevak Sangh.

== Death ==
He died in 2020. It was found that his death happened because of the complications associated with COVID -19. Though, he was recovered after being infected, but, he was hospitalized once again after some time from post COVID-19 complications, leading to his death.
