= Satish Kumar Singh Yadav =

Indian politician

Satish Kumar Singh

Member of Bihar Legislative Assembly
- Incumbent
- Assumed office 2025
- Preceded by: Ashok Kumar Singh
- Constituency: Ramgarh

Personal details
- Born: Satish Kumar; 1987 (age 38–39) Bihar, India
- Party: Bahujan Samaj Party
- Parent: Aganu Singh Yadav (Father)

Satish Kumar Singh Yadav is an Indian politician from Bahujan Samaj Party. He currently serves as a member of the Bihar Legislative Assembly from the Ramgarh constituency. He defeated Ashok Kumar Singh, a candidate of the Bharatiya Janata Party, by a margin of 30 votes in the 2025 Bihar Assembly election.

== Political career ==
In the previous by-election held in 2024, Yadav contested from the Ramgarh but was defeated by Ashok Kumar Singh of the BJP with a margin of 1,284 votes. He contested again in the 2025 Bihar Legislative Assembly election and won, becoming the only BSP candidate to win a seat.

Year	Constituency	Party	Result	Opponent	Margin	Notes
2024 (By-election)	Ramgarh	BSP	Lost	Ashok Kumar Singh (BJP)	1,284	
2025	Ramgarh	BSP	Won	Ashok Kumar Singh (BJP)	30	
