= Ajit Kushwaha =

Indian politician

Ajit Kumar Singh
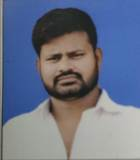

Member of the Bihar Legislative Assembly
- In office 2020–2025
- Preceded by: Dadan Pahalwan
- Succeeded by: Rahul Kumar Singh
- Constituency: Dumraon Assembly constituency

Personal details
- Born: 2 April 1986 (age 40)
- Party: Communist Party of India (Marxist-Leninist) Liberation
- Spouse: Shivani Singh
- Children: no
- Parents: Anil Kumar Singh (father); Urmila devi (mother)

Ajit Kumar Singh also known as Ajit Kumar Kushwaha is an Indian politician and a Member of the Bihar Legislative Assembly from the Dumraon Assembly constituency. Singh has been elected to assembly as a candidate of Communist Party of India (Marxist-Leninist) Liberation. He defeated Anjum Ara of Janata Dal (United) (JDU), as a candidate of Mahagathbandhan (Bihar) in the 2020 Bihar assembly elections. Singh won the tripolar contest, in which apart from JDU's Anjum Ara, former Member of Legislative Assembly from Dumraon, Dadan Pahalwan was also a participant.

== Political career ==
He was one of the youngest candidates contesting the assembly elections in 2020. Singh was a former president for the state of Bihar, of the Revolutionary Youth Association and a former secretary for the state of Bihar of All India Students Association. He completed his doctoral studies in the "history of farmer's agitation" from the Veer Kunwar Singh University and started taking part in political activism, before being elected as a member of the legislative assembly in 2020.

He secured 71,320 votes and defeated the second runner-up Anjum Ara (46,905 votes) in the 2020 Bihar Assembly elections.

== See also ==
- Amarjeet Kushwaha
