= Rahul Kumar Singh =

Indian politician

Member of the Bihar Legislative Assembly
- Incumbent
- Assumed office 14 November 2025
- Preceded by: Ajit Kushwaha
- Constituency: Dumraon

Personal details
- Party: Janata Dal (United)
- Profession: Politician

Rahul Kumar Singh is an Indian politician from Bihar. He is elected as a Member of Legislative Assembly in 2025 Bihar Legislative Assembly election from Dumraon constituency.

== Political career ==
Rahul Kumar Singh won from Dumraon constituency representing Janata Dal (United) in the 2025 Bihar Legislative Assembly election. He polled 79,411 votes and defeated his nearest rival, Ajit Kushwaha of Communist Party of India (Marxist–Leninist) Liberation, by a margin of 2,105 votes.
