= Lalmuni Chaubey =

Indian politician

Member of Parliament, Lok Sabha
- In office 1996–2009
- Preceded by: Tej Narayan Singh
- Succeeded by: Jagada Nand Singh
- Constituency: Buxar

Member of Bihar Legislative Assembly
- In office 1990–1995
- Preceded by: Parvej Ahsan Khan
- Succeeded by: Mahabali Singh
- Constituency: Chainpur
- In office 1972–1985
- Preceded by: Badri Singh
- Succeeded by: Parvej Ahsan Khan
- Constituency: Chainpur

Personal details
- Born: 6 September 1942 Bhabua, Bihar and Orissa, British India
- Died: 25 March 2016 (aged 73) AIIMS, Delhi, India
- Party: Bharatiya Janata Party
- Spouse: Manorma Chaubey
- Children: 2 sons and 5 daughters

Lalmuni Chaubey (6 September 1942 – 25 March 2016) was a member of the 14th Lok Sabha, the lower house of the Parliament of India. He represented the Buxar constituency of Bihar for four consecutive terms as a member of the Bharatiya Janata Party (BJP), having previously sat as a member of the Legislative Assembly of Bihar from 1972.

He died at AIIMS in Delhi.
