= Nisha Singh =

Indian politician (born 1979)

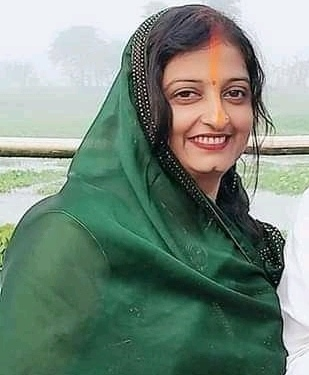

Member of Bihar Legislative Assembly
- Incumbent
- Assumed office 10 November 2020
- Preceded by: Binod Kumar Singh
- Constituency: Pranpur

Personal details
- Born: 6 May 1979 (age 47)
- Party: Bharatiya Janata Party
- Occupation: Politician

Nisha Singh is an Indian politician from Bihar and a Member of the Bihar Legislative Assembly. Singh won the Pranpur Assembly constituency on the BJP ticket in the 2020 Bihar Legislative Assembly election. Singh is married to veteran Bharatiya Janata Party leader Binod Singh Kushwaha, who served as a minister in Government of Bihar.

== Life and career ==
Nisha Singh started his political career after the death of her husband Binod Kumar Singh, a veteran leader of Koeri caste, who represented Pranpur Assembly constituency on the symbol of Bhartiya Janata Party. Singh was also the president of party's Bhojpur wing. His whole family resides in Bachnaha village of Katihar. She has two daughters with her husband. She contested 2020 Bihar Assembly election and won by defeating Tauqir Alam of Indian National Congress.

In 2022, Singh claimed that local police superintendent of Katihar district has talked with her in an unruly manner. She stated that this happened when she was inquiring about death of a person involved in illegal liquor trade .

After becoming victorious in 2020 Bihar Legislative Assembly election, she visited Fudki Tola Chuhlar village in a locality called Azamnagar located within her constituency as a part of her first public outreach campaign. She was welcomed by the people and in her address she announced that she will work for the construction of a network of roads in the region for the ease of transport.

== See also ==
- Pramod Kumar Sinha
- C. P. Sinha
