= Ashok Kumar Singh (Ramgarh) =

Indian politician

Member of Bihar Legislative Assembly
- Constituency: Ramgarh
- In office 10 Nov 2015 – 2020
- Preceded by: Ambika Yadav
- Succeeded by: Sudhakar Singh
- In office 2024–2025
- Preceded by: Sudhakar Singh
- Succeeded by: Satish Kumar Singh

Personal details
- Party: Bharatiya Janata Party
- Profession: Politician

Ashok Kumar Singh is an Indian politician from Bihar. He served a member of the Bihar Legislative Assembly from 2015 to 2020, and again from 2024 to 2025, representing Ramgarh Assembly constituency as a member of the Bharatiya Janata Party.

== See also ==
- List of chief ministers of Bihar
