= Dumraon Assembly constituency =

Constituency of the Bihar legislative assembly in India

- Constituency No. 201 for the Bihar Legislative Assembly

Constituency details
- Country: India
- Region: East India
- State: Bihar
- District: Buxar
- Lok Sabha constituency: Buxar
- Established: 1951
- Total electors: 324,739

Member of Legislative Assembly
- 18th Bihar Legislative Assembly
- Incumbent Rahul Kumar Singh
- Party: JD(U)
- Alliance: NDA
- Elected year: 2025

Dumraon Assembly constituency is one of 243 constituencies of legislative assembly of Bihar. It comes under Buxar Lok Sabha constituency.

== Overview ==
Dumraon comprises Community Blocks of Chaugain, Kesath & Nawanagar; Gram Panchayats of Chilhari, Kushalpur, Bhojpur Kadim, Bhojpur Jadid, Chhatanwar, Nuaon, Sowan, Ariaon, Nandan, Lakhan Dihra & Dumraon (M) of Dumraon CD Block.

== Members of the Legislative Assembly ==
Year	Member	Party
1952	Harihar Prasad Singh	Indian National Congress
1957	Ganga Prasad Singh	Indian National Congress
1962	Ganga Prasad Singh	Indian National Congress
1967	Harihar Prasad Singh	Independent politician
1972	Harihar Prasad Singh	Indian National Congress
1977	Ramashray Singh	Communist Party of India
1980	Raja Ram Arya	Indian National Congress
1981^	V. N. Bharti	Indian National Congress
1985	Basant Singh	Indian National Congress
1990	Basant Singh	Janata Dal
1995	Basant Singh	Janata Dal
2000	Dadan Singh Yadav	Independent politician
2005	Dadan Singh Yadav	Samajwadi Party
2005	Dadan Singh Yadav	Akhil Jan Vikas Dal
2010	Daud Ali	Janata Dal (United)
2015	Dadan Singh Yadav	Janata Dal (United)
2020	Ajit Kushwaha	Communist Party of India (Marxist–Leninist) Liberation
2025	Rahul Kumar Singh	Janata Dal

== Election results ==
=== 2025 ===
2025 Bihar Legislative Assembly election: Dumraon
Party	Candidate	Votes	%	±%
JD(U)	Rahul Kumar Singh	79,411	40.37	+13.56
CPI(ML)L	Dr. Ajit Kumar Singh	77,306	39.3	−1.46
BSP	Dadan Yadav	11,127	5.66	
JSP	Shivang Vijay Singh	5,273	2.68	
SBSP	Pradip Kumar Sharan	4,976	2.53	
Independent	Hemlata	3,994	2.03	
Independent	Bheem Kamkar	2,661	1.35	
RLJP	Mrityunjay Kumar Singh	1,794	0.91	
NOTA	None of the above	3,059	1.56	+0.49
Majority		2,105	1.07	−12.88
Turnout		196,707	60.57	+5.59
JD(U) gain from CPI(ML)L		Swing		

=== 2020 ===
2020 Bihar Legislative Assembly election: Dumraon
Party	Candidate	Votes	%	±%
CPI(ML)L	Ajit Kushwaha	71,320	40.76	
JD(U)	Anjum Ara	46,905	26.81	▼21.09
RLSP	Arvind Pratap Shahi @ Banti Shahi	11,517	6.58	▼23.4
Independent	Shivang Vijay Singh	9,390	5.37	
Independent	Dadan Yadav	9,166	5.24	
LJP	Akhilesh Kumar Singh	6,474	3.7	
Independent	Sunil Kumar @ Pappu Yadav	4,265	2.44	
Independent	Mohammad Afzal Ansari	2,961	1.69	▲1.26
JAP(L)	Shree Kant Singh	1,858	1.06	▼1.43
Independent	Santosh Kumar Choubey	1,763	1.01	
Rashtriya Jaihind Party	Vikash Singh	1,628	0.93	
NOTA	None of the above	1,877	1.07	▼1.12
Majority		24,415	13.95	▼3.97
Turnout		174,976	54.98	▼2.3
CPI(ML)L gain from JD(U)		Swing		

=== 2015 ===
2015 Bihar Legislative Assembly election: Dumraon
Party	Candidate	Votes	%	±%
JD(U)	Dadan Yadav	81,081	47.9	
RLSP	Ram Bihari Singh	50,742	29.98	
Independent	Srikant Singh	14,656	8.66	
JAP(L)	Daud Ali	4,216	2.49	
BSP	Pradeep Kumar	3,033	1.79	
Independent	Rahul Pratap Singh	1,684	0.99	
NOTA	None of the above	3,705	2.19	
Majority		30,339	17.92	
Turnout		169,254	57.28	

== See also ==
- List of Assembly constituencies of Bihar
