= Rajpur, Bihar Assembly constituency =

- Constituency No. 202 for the Bihar Legislative Assembly

Constituency details
- Country: India
- Region: East India
- State: Bihar
- District: Buxar
- Established: 1977
- Total electors: 336,695

Member of Legislative Assembly
- 18th Bihar Legislative Assembly
- Incumbent Santosh Kumar Nirala
- Party: JD(U)
- Alliance: NDA
- Elected year: 2025

Rajpur Assembly constituency is one of 243 constituencies of legislative assembly of Bihar. It comes under Buxar Lok Sabha constituency.

== Overview ==
Rajpur comprises community blocks of Rajpur & Itarhi; Gram Panchayats Ataon, Kanjharua, Mathila, Mugaon, Kasian & Koransarai of Dumraon CD Block.

== Members of the Legislative Assembly ==
Year	Name	Party
1977	Nand Kishore Prasad	Janata Party
1980	Chaturi Ram	Indian National Congress
1985	Ram Narain Ram	Bharatiya Janata Party
1990	Ram Narain Ram	Bharatiya Janata Party
1995	Arjun Ram	Communist Party of India
2000	Chhedi Lal Ram	Bahujan Samaj Party
2005	Shyam Payari Devi	Janata Dal (United)
2005	Shyam Payari Devi	Janata Dal (United)
2010	Santosh Kumar Nirala	Janata Dal (United)
2015	Santosh Kumar Nirala	Janata Dal (United)
2020	Vishwanath Ram	Indian National Congress
2025	Santosh Kumar Nirala	Janata Dal (United)

== Election results ==
=== 2025 ===
Bihar Assembly election, 2025: Rajpur
Party	Candidate	Votes	%	±%
JD(U)	Santosh Kumar Nirala	80,701	38.19	+12.91
INC	Vishvanatn Ram	71,565	33.86	−2.9
BSP	Lal Jee Ram	20,498	9.7	−14.04
JSP	Dhananjay Paswan	12,491	5.91	
SBSP	Shiv Kumar Ram	6,749	3.19	
ASP(KR)	Anil Kumar Ram	4,557	2.16	
Sanyukt Kisan Vikas Party	Suraj Prakash Ram	2,753	1.3	
Bhartiya Sarthak Party	Subhash Ram	2,517	1.19	
NOTA	None of the above	2,778	1.31	−0.23
Majority		9,136	4.33	−7.15
Turnout		211,325	62.76	+5.79
JD(U) gain from INC		Swing		

=== 2020 ===
Bihar Assembly election, 2020: Rajpur
Party	Candidate	Votes	%	±%
INC	Vishwanath Ram	67,871	36.76	
JD(U)	Santosh Kumar Nirala	46,667	25.28	−22.68
BSP	Sanjay Ram	43,836	23.74	+14.04
LJP	Nirbhaya Kumar Nirala	7,449	4.03	
Independent	Ajad Paswan	4,276	2.32	
Independent	Chhedi Lal Ram	2,365	1.28	
Independent	Neelkamal Prasad	1,873	1.01	
NOTA	None of the above	2,841	1.54	−0.14
Majority		21,204	11.48	−7.2
Turnout		184,616	56.97	−0.37
INC gain from JD(U)		Swing		

=== 2015 ===
2015 Bihar Legislative Assembly election: Rajpur
Party	Candidate	Votes	%	±%
JD(U)	Santosh Kumar Nirala	84,184	47.96	
BJP	Bishawnath Ram	51,396	29.28	
BSP	Lalji Ram	17,031	9.7	
SBSP	Ajad Paswan	5,540	3.16	
Independent	Raj Bali Ram	3,495	1.99	
Independent	Surendra Paswan	2,940	1.67	
CPI(ML)L	Ramashanker Ram	2,143	1.22	
NOTA	None of the above	2,941	1.68	
Majority		32,788	18.68	
Turnout		175,536	57.34	
