= Ambika Singh Yadav =

Indian politician

Member of Bihar Legislative Assembly
- In office 2009–2015
- Preceded by: Jagada Nand Singh
- Succeeded by: Ashok Kumar Singh
- Constituency: Ramgarh

Personal details
- Born: VILL. BICHIYA, P.O-PACHILKHI, P.S-DURGAVATI, DIST. KAIMUR
- Died: 17/06/2026 Trauma Centre BHU Varanasi
- Party: Bahujan Samaj Party (2020-till)
- Other party: Rashtriya Janata Dal (before-2020)
- Profession: Politician

Ambika Singh Yadav is an Indian politician. He was elected to the Bihar Legislative Assembly from Ramgarh in 2009 but was defeated for re-election in 2015. He was during that time a member of the Rashtriya Janata Dal. In 2020, Yadav left Rashtriya Janata Dal and joined the Bahujan Samaj Party.
