= Chainpur Assembly constituency =

Constituency of the Bihar legislative assembly in India

- Constituency No. 206 for the Bihar Legislative Assembly

Constituency details
- Country: India
- Region: East India
- State: Bihar
- District: Kaimur
- Established: 1951
- Total electors: 329,045

Member of Legislative Assembly
- 18th Bihar Legislative Assembly
- Incumbent Md. Zama Khan
- Party: JD(U)
- Alliance: NDA
- Elected year: 2025
- Preceded by: Brij Kishor Bind

Chainpur Assembly constituency is one of 243 constituencies of legislative assembly of Bihar. It comes under Sasaram Lok Sabha constituency.

== Overview ==
Chainpur comprises Community Blocks of Chand, Chainpur, Adhaura & Bhagwanpur.

== Members of the Legislative Assembly ==
Year	Member	Party
1952	Guptanath Singh	Indian National Congress
1967	Mangal Charan Singh	Indian National Congress
1969	Badri Singh	Praja Socialist Party
1972	Lalmuni Chaubey	Bharatiya Jana Sangh
1977	Lalmuni Chaubey	Janata Party
1980	Lalmuni Chaubey	Bharatiya Janata Party
1985	Parwez Ahsan Khan	Indian National Congress
1990	Lalmuni Chaubey	Bharatiya Janata Party
1995	Mahabali Singh	Bahujan Samaj Party
2000	Mahabali Singh	Bahujan Samaj Party
2005	Mahabali Singh	Rashtriya Janata Dal
2005	Mahabali Singh	Rashtriya Janata Dal
2009^	Brij Kishor Bind	Bharatiya Janata Party
2010	Brij Kishor Bind	Bharatiya Janata Party
2015	Brij Kishor Bind	Bharatiya Janata Party
2020	Mohd Zama Khan	Bahujan Samaj Party
2021^	Mohd Zama Khan	Janata Dal (United)
2025	Mohd Zama Khan	Janata Dal (United)

== Election results ==
=== 2025 ===
Bihar Legislative Assembly Election, 2025: Chainpur
Party	Candidate	Votes	%	±%
JD(U)	Mohd Zama Khan	70,876	30.94	
RJD	Brij Kishor Bind	62,514	27.29	
BSP	Dhiraj Singh	51,200	22.35	▼23.89
JSP	Hemant Kumar Choubey	6,877	3.0	
Bhagidari Party (P)	Raja Lal Singh	5,338	2.33	
Independent	Uttam Patel	5,302	2.31	
VIP	Govind Vind	5,144	2.25	
SBSP	Sushank Kumar Singh	4,900	2.14	
ASP(KR)	Majnu Gond	3,252	1.42	
NOTA	None of the above	1,321	0.58	▲0.29
Majority		8,362	3.65	▼8.14
Turnout		229,080	69.62	▲4.9
JD(U) gain from BSP		Swing		

=== 2020 ===
Bihar Assembly election, 2020: Chainpur
Party	Candidate	Votes	%	±%
BSP	Mohd Zama Khan	95,245	46.24	+13.46
BJP	Brij Kishor Bind	70,951	34.45	+1.29
Independent	Niraj Pandey	13,119	6.37	
INC	Prakash Kumar Singh	5,414	2.63	
Independent	Majanu Gond	4,191	2.03	
Independent	Diwan Arshad Husain Khan	2,274	1.1	
Independent	Prahalad Bind	2,025	0.98	−0.03
Log Jan Party Secular	Ram Raj Sharma	1,875	0.91	
NOTA	None of the above	599	0.29	−1.44
Majority		24,294	11.79	+11.41
Turnout		205,970	64.72	+3.14
BSP gain from BJP		Swing		

=== 2015 ===
2015 Bihar Legislative Assembly election: Chainpur
Party	Candidate	Votes	%	±%
BJP	Brij Kishor Bind	58,913	33.16	
BSP	Mohammad Zama Khan	58,242	32.78	
JD(U)	Mahabali Singh	30,287	17.05	
SP	Alok Kumar Singh	12,802	7.21	
SS	Parmeshwar Singh	3,408	1.92	
CPI(M)	Ranglal Paswan	2,573	1.45	
Independent	Prahalad Bind	1,801	1.01	
NOTA	None of the above	3,074	1.73	
Majority		671	0.38	
Turnout		177,671	61.58	
BJP hold		Swing		

=== 2010 ===
Bihar Assembly election, 2010: Chainpur
Party	Candidate	Votes	%	±%
BJP	Brij Kishor Bind	46,510	32.75	
BSP	Dr. Ajay Alok	32930	23.18	
INC	Mohd Zama Khan	19,552		
Majority				
Turnout				
BJP gain from BSP		Swing		

== See also ==
- List of constituencies of Bihar Legislative Assembly
