= Brij Kishor Bind =

Indian politician

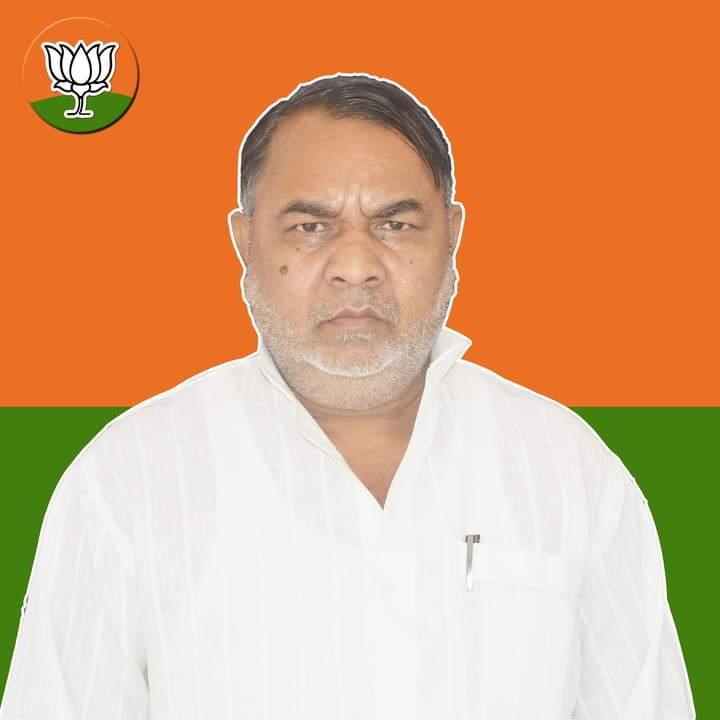

Minister of Mines & Geology Government of Bihar
- In office 2 June 2019 – 16 November 2020
- Chief Minister: Nitish Kumar
- Preceded by: Binod Kumar Singh
- Succeeded by: Jibesh Kumar

Minister of BC & EBC Welfare Government of Bihar
- In office 29 July 2017 – 2 June 2019
- Chief Minister: Nitish Kumar
- Preceded by: Tejashwi Yadav
- Succeeded by: Binod Kumar Singh

Member of Bihar Legislative Assembly
- In office 2009–2020
- Preceded by: Mahabali Singh
- Succeeded by: Mohd Zama Khan
- Constituency: Chainpur

Personal details
- Born: 1 January 1966 (age 60) Kaimur district, Bihar
- Party: Rashtriya Janata Dal
- Other political affiliations: Bharatiya Janata Party
- Spouse: Kalawati Devi
- Children: 6 sons
- Parent: Antu Bind (father)
- Education: Bachelor of Arts
- Profession: Politician

Brij Kishor Bind is an Indian politician from Bharatiya Janata Party and was the former cabinet minister of Mines, Geology, Backward and EBC Welfare department in the Government of Bihar. He has been elected on three occasions as a MLA for the Chainpur constituency in Kaimur district, Bihar. He belongs to Bind caste. According to former Bihar minister Brij Kishor Bind, Lord Shiva has been described as Bind caste in Shiva Purana.
