= Dadan Pahalwan =

Indian politician

Member of Bihar Legislative Assembly
- In office 2015–2020
- Preceded by: Dr. Daud Ali
- Succeeded by: Ajit Kumar Singh
- Constituency: Dumraon

Personal details
- Born: 1 January 1964 (age 62) Samhar, Dumraon Buxar, India
- Party: Janata Dal (United)
- Education: Intermediate
- Profession: Politician

Dadan Singh Yadav alias Dadan Pahalwan is an Indian politician. He was elected to the Bihar Legislative Assembly from Dumraon as the 2015 Member of Bihar Legislative Assembly as a member of the Janata Dal (United). He contested the 2014 Indian general election as a candidate of the Bahujan Samaj Party but lost.
