= Jai Narain Prasad Nishad =

Indian politician

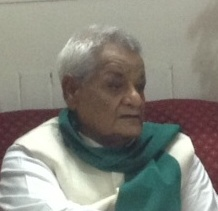

Union Minister of State (Independent Charge) for Non-Conventional Energy Sources
- In office 21 February 1997 – 10 January 1998
- Prime Minister: H. D. Deve Gowda; Inder Kumar Gujral
- Preceded by: H. D. Deve Gowda
- Succeeded by: Inder Kumar Gujral

Union Minister of State (Independent Charge) for Environment and Forests
- In office 29 June 1996 – 21 February 1997
- Prime Minister: H. D. Deve Gowda
- Preceded by: H. D. Deve Gowda
- Succeeded by: Saifuddin Soz

Union Minister of State for Environment and Forests
- In office 1 June 1996 – 29 June 1996
- Prime Minister: H. D. Deve Gowda
- Minister: H. D. Deve Gowda

Member of Parliament, Lok Sabha
- In office 16 May 2009 – 16 May 2014
- Preceded by: George Fernandes
- Succeeded by: Ajay Nishad
- Constituency: Muzaffarpur
- In office 12 May 1996 – 13 May 2004
- Preceded by: George Fernandes
- Succeeded by: George Fernandes
- Constituency: Muzaffarpur

Member of Parliament, Rajya Sabha
- In office 8 July 2004 – 26 March 2008
- Succeeded by: Rajiv Pratap Rudy
- Constituency: Bihar

Personal details
- Born: 18 November 1930
- Died: 24 December 2018 (aged 88)
- Party: Janata Dal (United)
- Other political affiliations: Bharatiya Janata Party; Janata Dal
- Children: Ajay Nishad

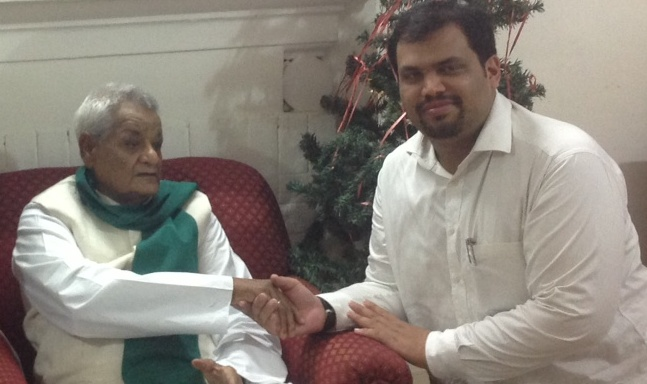
Cap (Retd.) Jai Narain Nishad with the activist Harikumar Pallathadka in June 2013

Jai Narain Prasad Nishad (18 November 1930 – 24 December 2018) was an Indian politician and member of parliament from Muzaffarpur Lok Sabha Constituency in the Indian State of Bihar. He was a Union Minister for State in 1996-1998 and a member of Lok Sabha five times and a former member of Rajya Sabha. He was a member of Janata Dal (United) and with the Bharatiya Janata Party. His son, Ajay Nishad is the MP of Muzaffarpur.

== Disqualified from parliament ==
Nishad was a member of BJP when he was disqualified for switching sides as a member of Rajya Sabha in April 2008 under the Anti-defection Law by the Vice President of India who is also the chairman of Rajya Sabha. He was removed as a member of Rajya Sabha.

During his political career, he changed to five political parties fifteen times but got elected from the same seat five times.

Lok Sabha
Preceded by George Fernandes	Member of Parliament for Muzaffarpur; 1996 – 2004	Succeeded by George Fernandes
Preceded by George Fernandes	Member of Parliament for Muzaffarpur; 2009 – 2014	Succeeded by Ajay Nishad
