= Syed Faisal Ali =

Indian politician

Member of Bihar Legislative Council

Personal details
- Born: Patna, India.
- Political party: Rashtriya Janata Dal

Syed Faisal Ali is an Indian politician who is a member of the Bihar Legislative Council. He is also the National General Secretary for the Rashtriya Janata Dal.

Ali was born in Patna, India. His father Syed Ashahad Ali was a lawyer at the Patna High Court and the vice president of the Janata Party.

== Political career ==
Ali joined the RJD. He contested the 2019 Indian general election from Sheohar Lok Sabha constituency but lost to Rama Devi. In 2023 he contested the election for the Bihar Legislative Council and was elected as an MLC.
