= Mahabali Singh =

Indian politician

Member of Parliament, Lok Sabha
- In office 2019–2024
- Preceded by: Upendra Kushwaha
- Succeeded by: Raja Ram Singh Kushwaha
- In office 2009–2014
- Preceded by: Constituency created
- Succeeded by: Upendra Kushwaha
- Constituency: Karakat

Member of Bihar Legislative Assembly
- In office 1995–2009
- Preceded by: Lalmuni Chaubey
- Succeeded by: Brij Kishor Bind
- Constituency: Chainpur

Personal details
- Born: 20 April 1955 (age 70)
- Party: Janata Dal (United)
- Other political affiliations: Rashtriya Janata Dal

Mahabali Singh Kushwaha(born 20 April 1955) is an Indian politician belonging to Bhabua, Kaimur district, Bihar. He was a member of the Indian Parliament, representing Karakat.

Mahabali Singh twice represented Chainpur seat in Bihar Legislative Assembly as a member of the Bahujan Samaj Party. During his second tenure, he defected to Rashtriya Janata Dal of Lalu Prasad Yadav and became the PWD minister in the government led by Rabri Devi in 2002.

Later, Singh joined Janata Dal (United), led by Nitish Kumar, and won the Chainpur seat in the 2005 and 2006 assembly elections.

In 2009, Singh won Karakat parliamentary constituency as a JD(U) candidate. He lost the seat to Upendra Kushwaha of the Rashtriya Lok Samata Party in 2014 and in 2019 he regained it from Kushwaha.

== Life and career ==
Mahabali Singh was born in Khiri village, Bhagwanpur District in Kaimur region of Bihar. Between 1995 and 2009, he has served as the Member of Bihar Legislative Assembly four times. In 2003–2004, Singh took charge under Bihar Government as Cabinet Minister, PWD. In 2004–2005, he was further appointed Cabinet Minister for Food & Civil Supplies in Bihar Government. Singh contested 2009 Lok Sabha elections and was elected to 15th Lok Sabha. On 31 August 2009, he was appointed a member of Committee on Defence. He was again appointed Member of Committee on Ethics and Committee on Power of Lok Sabha respectively. Singh also took keen interest in organisational works and has published Gautam Budhha, Ambedkar and Jagdev Vichar Manch. He likes football, cricket, and folk dramas. In his capacity as Lok Sabha member, he has visited Malaysia, Singapore, and Thailand.

Singh has supported the enumeration of population of India on the basis of caste. He was amongst the political leaders of Bihar, who pushed for Bihar Caste Survey 2022. Singh spoke in support of caste enumeration in 2023, during a discussion on budget in Lok Sabha.
