= Mapatpur =

Coordinates: 25°20′N 83°44′E

Mapatpur is a small village in Nuaon Tehsil in Ramgarh Block in Kaimur district of the Indian state of Bihar. It comes under the Panchayat raj political system and belongs to the Patna Division.

== Location ==
It is located 41 km north of the district headquarters of Bhabua and 177 km from state capital Patna. Mapatpur is bounded by Noan Block to the north, Mohania Block to the south, and Durgawati and Berahani Blocks to the west. Mohania, Zamania, Bhabua, and Ghazipur are the nearest cities. This place is on the border between Kaimur (bhabua) and Chandauli District. It is near the border of Ghazipur district.

As per 2009 stats, Taraitha is the gram panchayat of Mapatpur village.

== Demographics ==
The village covers 134 hectares. Its population is 1,080 people. There are about 146 houses in Mapatpur village.
