= Santosh Kumar Nirala =

Politician from Bihar, India

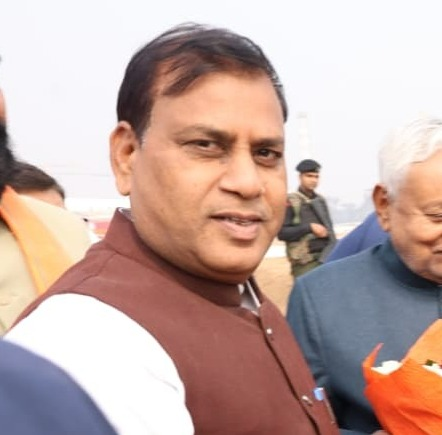

Member of Bihar Legislative Assembly
- Incumbent
- Assumed office 2025
- Preceded by: Vishwanath Ram
- Constituency: Rajpur
- In office 2010–2020
- Preceded by: Shyam Payari Devi
- Succeeded by: Vishwanath Ram
- Constituency: Rajpur

Minister of Transport Government of Bihar
- In office 29 July 2017 – 16 November 2020
- Preceded by: Chandrika Roy
- Succeeded by: Sheela Kumari

Minister of SC & ST Welfare Government of Bihar
- In office 20 November 2015 – 26 July 2017
- Preceded by: Jitan Ram Manjhi
- Succeeded by: Ramesh Rishidev

Personal details
- Born: 5 April 1974 (age 51) Chunni Tola, Buxar district, Bihar
- Party: Janata Dal (United)
- Spouse: Manju Kumari
- Children: 3
- Education: BA; LLB

Santosh Kumar Nirala is an Indian politician from Buxar district of Bihar, India. He served as Minister of Transport, Bihar from 29 July 2017 to 2020 and is a former member of Bihar Legislative Assembly representing the Rajpur constituency from 2010 to 2020.

== Political career ==
Nirala made entry into politics in 1992. In 2010 Bihar Legislative Assembly election, he won from Rajpur (Bihar Vidhan Sabha constituency). Again in 2015 Bihar Legislative Assembly election, he won from the same constituency. He also held the position as Minister of SC & ST Welfare Department, Bihar from 2014 to 2017. Currently, he is Minister of Transport Department, Bihar.
