= Hemrajpur =

Village in Uttar Pradesh, India

- Village
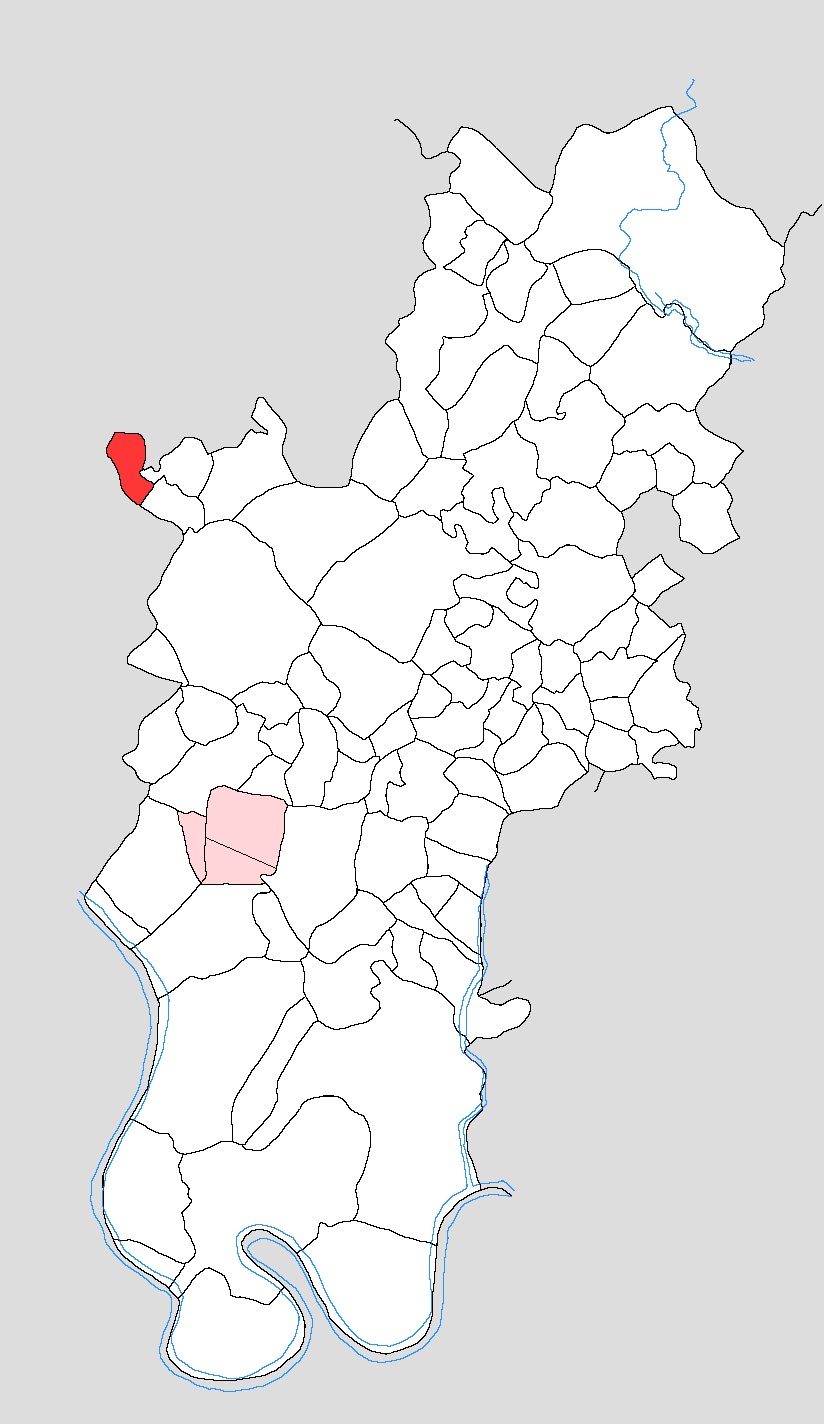
- Map showing Hemrajpur in Tundla block

- Location in Uttar Pradesh, India
- Coordinates: 27.30542°N 78.20548°E
- Country: India
- State: Uttar Pradesh
- District: Firozabad
- Tehsil: Tundla

Area
  - Total: 1.583 km^{2} (0.611 sq mi)

Population (2011)
  - Total: 1,351
  - Density: 853.4/km^{2} (2,210/sq mi)
- Time zone: UTC+5:30 (IST)
- PIN: 283204

Hemrajpur (Hemrājpur) is a village in Tundla block of Firozabad district, Uttar Pradesh. As of 2011, it has a population of 1,351, in 226 households.

== Demographics ==
As of 2011, Hemrajpur had a population of 1,351, in 226 households. This population was 54.6% male (737) and 45.4% female (614). The 0-6 age group numbered 249 (128 male and 121 female), making up 18.4% of the total population. 861 residents were members of Scheduled Castes, or 63.7% of the total.

The 1981 census recorded Hemrajpur as having a population of 696 people (402 male and 294 female), in 124 households and 117 physical houses.

The 1961 census recorded Hemrajpur as comprising 2 hamlets, with a total population of 463 people (240 male and 223 female), in 80 households and 65 physical houses. The area of the village was given as 394 acres.

== Infrastructure ==
As of 2011, Hemrajpur had 1 primary school; it did not have any healthcare facilities. Drinking water was provided by hand pump; there were no public toilets. The village did not have a post office or public library; there was at least some access to electricity for all purposes. Streets were made of both kachcha and pakka materials.
