= Anant Sharma =

Indian politician (1919–1988)

Anant Prasad Sharma
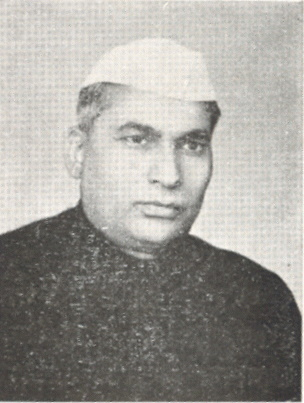

Governor of West Bengal
- In office 10 October 1983 – 16 August 1984
- Appointed by: Zail Singh
- Chief Minister: Jyoti Basu
- Preceded by: B. D. Pande
- Succeeded by: Satish Chandra (Acting)

Governor of Punjab
- In office 21 February 1983 – 10 October 1983
- Appointed by: Zail Singh
- Chief Minister: Darbara Singh
- Preceded by: Surjit Singh Sandhawalia (Acting)
- Succeeded by: B. D. Pande

Minister of Communications
- In office 2 September 1982 – 14 February 1983
- Prime Minister: Indira Gandhi
- Preceded by: C. M. Stephen
- Succeeded by: Indira Gandhi

Minister of Tourism and Civil Aviation
- In office 8 June 1980 – 2 September 1982
- Prime Minister: Indira Gandhi
- Preceded by: Janaki Ballabh Patnaik
- Succeeded by: Indira Gandhi

Minister of Shipping and Transport
- In office 14 January 1980 – 19 October 1980
- Prime Minister: Indira Gandhi
- Preceded by: Janeshwar Mishra (Minister of State, I/C)
- Succeeded by: Veerendra Patil

Minister of State for Industry
- In office 9 August 1976 – 24 March 1977 Serving with Buddha Priya Maurya
- Prime Minister: Indira Gandhi
- Minister: T. A. Pai

Minister of State for Industry and Civil Supplies
- In office 10 October 1974 – 9 August 1976 Serving with Buddha Priya Maurya and A. C. George
- Prime Minister: Indira Gandhi
- Minister: T. A. Pai

Personal details
- Born: 25 December 1919
- Died: October 1988 (aged 68)

Anant Prasad Sharma (25 December 1919 – October 1988) was an Indian Railway Union leader, politician who became Minister of State for Industry, and Union Minister of the government of India. He was also the Governor of the State of Punjab and the State of West Bengal. He was a member of the 3rd Lok Sabha and 5th Lok Sabha from Buxar (Lok Sabha constituency). He was a member of the Rajya Sabha three times, in 1968–1971, 1978–1983 and 1984–1988.

== Early years and education ==
Anant Sharma was born on 25 December 1919 to Ram Naresh Sharma, in Gaudarh village near Shahpur in Bhojpur District, Bihar (then in Shahabad District). He was born into a humble family. He studied at D.A.V. School.

== Career ==
Sharma was a Railway Union Leader. Because of his career as a trade union leader, he was invited by Jawaharlal Nehru, the first Prime Minister of independent India, to run for the Parliamentary elections from the constituency of Buxar, Bihar. He ran and won in 1962 and again in 1971. In 1966, he became the President of Bihar Pradesh Congress Committee (PCC).

In 1974, he was made the Minister of State for Industry, Government of India, under the Prime Ministership of Indira Gandhi. Thereafter, he went on to become the Union Minister for Ministries including Communications, Surface Transport, Shipping and Civil Aviation in the Government of India. He was the Minister of Communications from 1982 to 1983. Sharma became the Governor of the State of Punjab and the State of West Bengal in 1983.

== Personal life ==
He was married to Tara Devi, and the couple had two sons. He died in October 1988.

His elder son Arun Kumar Sharma, Hriday Narayan Sharma, an India Railway officer was asked by Rajiv Gandhi to contest the Bihar State Assembly Elections from Dumraon in 1990. He is settled in Delhi along with his family.

== Election History ==
=== Rajya Sabha ===
Position	Party	Constituency	From	To	Tenure
Member of Parliament, Rajya Sabha (1st Term)	INC	Bihar	3 April 1968	11 March 1971	2 years, 342 days
Member of Parliament, Rajya Sabha (2nd Term)	INC(I)	Bihar	10 April 1978	19 February 1983	4 years, 315 days
Member of Parliament, Rajya Sabha (3rd Term)	INC(I)	Bihar	22 August 1984	2 April 1988	3 years, 224 days
