= Muzaffarpur Lok Sabha constituency =

Lok Sabha Constituency in Bihar, India

Coordinates: 26.1°N 85.4°E

Muzaffarpur
- Lok Sabha constituency

Constituency details
- Country: India
- Region: East India
- State: Bihar
- Established: 1957
- Reservation: None

Member of Parliament
- 18th Lok Sabha
- Incumbent Raj Bhushan Choudhary (Bharatiya Janata Party, minister, 2024–)
- Alliance: NDA
- Preceded by: Ajay Nishad; Won As : BJP Current : INC

Muzaffarpur Lok Sabha constituency is one of the 40 Lok Sabha (parliamentary) constituencies in the Indian state of Bihar.

== Vidhan Sabha segments ==
#	Name	District	Member	Party	2024 lead
88	Gaighat	Muzaffarpur	Komal Singh	JD(U)	BJP
89	Aurai	Muzaffarpur	Rama Nishad	BJP	BJP
91	Bochahan (SC)	Muzaffarpur	Baby Kumari	LJP(RV)	BJP
92	Sakra (SC)	Muzaffarpur	Aditya Kumar	JD(U)	BJP
93	Kurhani	Muzaffarpur	Kedar Gupta	BJP	BJP
94	Muzaffarpur	Muzaffarpur	Ranjan Kumar	BJP	BJP

== Members of Parliament ==
- 1952: Shyam Nandan Sahay, Indian National Congress (Muzaffarpur-Central)
- 1952: Awadeshwar Prasad Sinha, Indian National Congress (Muzaffarpur-East)
- 1952: Chandeshwar Prasad Narayan Singh, Indian National Congress (Muzaffarpur-North West)
- 1952: Digvijay Narain Singh, Indian National Congress (Muzaffarpur-North East)
- 1952: Rameshwar Sahu, Indian National Congress (Muzaffarpur cum Darbhanga)
- 1952: Rajeshwara Patel, Indian National Congress (Muzaffarpur cum Darbhanga)

Year	Name	Party
1957	Shyam Nandan Sahay	Indian National Congress
1957^	Asoka Mehta	Praja Socialist Party
1962	Digvijay Narain Singh	Indian National Congress
1967	Digvijay Narain Singh	Indian National Congress
1971	Nawal Kishore Sinha	Indian National Congress
1977	George Fernandes	Janata Party
1980	George Fernandes	Janata Party (Secular)
1984	Laliteshwar Prasad Shahi	Indian National Congress
1989	George Fernandes	Janata Dal
1991	George Fernandes	Janata Dal
1996	Jai Narain Prasad Nishad	Janata Dal
1998	Jai Narain Prasad Nishad	Rashtriya Janata Dal
1999	Jai Narain Prasad Nishad	Janata Dal (United)
2004	George Fernandes	Janata Dal (United)
2009	Jai Narain Prasad Nishad	Janata Dal (United)
2014	Ajay Nishad	Bharatiya Janata Party
2019	Ajay Nishad	Bharatiya Janata Party
2024	Raj Bhushan Choudhary	Bharatiya Janata Party

^ by-poll

== Election results ==
=== 2024 ===
2024 Indian general elections: Muzaffarpur
Party	Candidate	Votes	%	±%
BJP	Raj Bhushan Choudhary	619,749	55.71	
INC	Ajay Nishad	3,84,822	34.59	
NOTA	None Of The Above	7,588	0.68	
Margin of victory		2,34,927	21.12	
Turnout		11,12,933	59.54	
BJP hold		Swing		

=== 2019 ===
General Election, 2019: Muzaffarpur
Party	Candidate	Votes	%	±%
BJP	Ajay Nishad	666,878	63.03	+13.57
VIP	Raj Bhushan Choudhary	2,56,890	24.28	+24.28
NOTA	None Of The Above	9,690	1.02	+1.02
Margin of victory		4,09,988	39.75	
Turnout		10,58,507	61.71	
BJP hold		Swing		

=== General Election 2014 ===
General Election, 2014: Muzaffarpur
Party	Candidate	Votes	%	±%
BJP	Ajay Nishad	4,69,295	49.46	+49.46
INC	Akhilesh Prasad Singh	2,46,873	26.02	+8.60
JD(U)	Bijendra Chaudhary	85,140	8.97	−22.40
SS	Ashok Kumar Jha	19,945	2.10	+2.10
RAJVP	Raghvendra Pratap Singh	13,283	1.40	+1.40
NOTA	None Of The Above	9,690	1.02	+1.02
Margin of victory		2,22,422	23.44	+15.76
Turnout		9,48,887	63.10	+16.69
BJP gain from JD(U)		Swing		

=== Lok Sabha Election 2009 ===
General Election, 2009: Muzaffarpur
Party	Candidate	Votes	%	±%
JD(U)	Jai Narain Prasad Nishad	195,091		
LJP	Bhagwanlal Sahni	147,282		
INC	Vinita Vijay	108,306		
Independent	Vijendra Chaudhary	44,349		
Independent	George Fernandes	22,804		
Independent	Ashok Kumar Lalan	13,450		
BSP	Sameer Kumar	12,195		
Independent	Ahmad Raza	9,638		
RVMP	Md. Saleem	9,524		
JGR	Reyaj Ahmad Atish	7,356		
CPI(ML)L	Jitendra Yadav	6,840		
Independent	Syed Alamdar Hussain	5,597		
RASED	Mithilesh Kumar	5,353		
RPP	Mahendra Prasad	4,632		
RKSP	Dinesh Kumar Kushwaha	4,079		
AIFB	Ram Dayal Ram	3,441		
Independent	Tarkeshwar Paswan	3,397		
PSS	Neelu Singh	3,272		
Independent	Sadanand Kishore Thakur	3,077		
BJKVP	Devendra Rakesh	2,888		
ABJS	Md. Rahamtullaha	2,778		
RDMP	Mohammad Shamim	2,230		
Independent	Shambhu Sahni	2,142		
Independent	Vinod Paswan	2,092		
Majority		47,779		
Turnout				
JD(U) hold		Swing		

=== Lok Sabha Election 1980 ===
- George Fernandes (Janata Party - Secular) : 195,510 votes
- Digvijay Narayan Singh (Janata Party) : 172,401 votes
- Congress in third place. Rajani Saha : 66,744

=== Lok Sabha Election 1977 ===
- George Fernandes (Janata Party) : 396,687 votes (78.23%)
- Nitishwer Prasad Singh (Congress) : 62470 (12.32%). Lost by 334,217 votes.
- Ramdeo Sharma (CPI) : 26,408

== See also ==
- Muzaffarpur district
- List of constituencies of the Lok Sabha
