= Ajay Nishad =

Indian politician

Member of parliament for Muzaffarpur
- In office 16 May 2014 – 4 June 2024
- Preceded by: Jai Narain Prasad Nishad
- Constituency: Muzaffarpur

Personal details
- Born: 2 October 1966 (age 60) Hajipur, Bihar, India
- Party: Bharatiya Janata Party (until 2024, 2025–present)
- Other political affiliations: Indian National Congress (2024–2025); Rashtriya Janata Dal
- Spouse: Rama Nishad
- Education: Babasaheb Bhimrao Ambedkar Bihar University
- Website: https://ajaynishad.in/

Ajay Nishad is an Indian politician and the ex member of parliament from Muzaffarpur. He won the 2014 and the 2019 general election being a Bharatiya Janata Party candidate. He is the son of former Minister Jai Narain Prasad Nishad. Nishad had earlier contested and lost two assembly elections as a Rashtriya Janata Dal candidate from Kurhani and Sahebganj constituencies respectively.

== Election results ==
General Election, 2014: Muzaffarpur
Party	Candidate	Votes	%	±%
BJP	Ajay Nishad	4,69,295	49.46	+49.46
INC	Akhilesh Prasad Singh	2,46,873	26.02	+8.60
JD(U)	Bijendra Chaudhary	85,140	8.97	−22.40
SS	Ashok Kumar Jha	19,945	2.10	+2.10
RAJVP	Raghvendra Pratap Singh	13,283	1.40	+1.40
NOTA	None Of The Above	9,690	1.02	+1.02
Margin of victory		2,22,422	23.44	+15.76
Turnout		9,48,887	63.10	+16.69
BJP gain from JD(U)		Swing	+49.46	
