= Jagada Nand Singh =

Indian politician (born 1945)

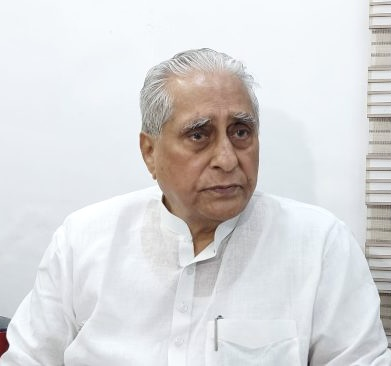

President of Rashtriya Janata Dal of Bihar
- In office November 2019 – 19 June 2025
- Preceded by: Ram Chandra Purve
- Succeeded by: Mangani Lal Mandal

Member of Indian Parliament
- In office 2009–2014
- Constituency: Buxar

Member of Bihar Legislative Assembly
- In office 1985–2009
- Constituency: Ramgarh, Bihar Assembly constituency

Personal details
- Born: 15 July 1945 (age 80) Buxar, Bihar, British India
- Spouse: Bimla Devi
- Children: Sudhakar Singh
- Education: Banaras Hindu University; Harish Chandra College; Gorakhpur University

Jagada Nand Singh (born 15 July 1945) is an Indian politician. He is son of Lt. Ramruchi Singh and has done LLB from Harish Chander College in Varanasi in the year 1973. He was a member of the Indian Parliament and represented Buxar (Lok Sabha constituency) in the 15th Lok Sabha from RJD. He was also a 6 term MLA of RJD from Ramgarh Constituency before he became an MP from Buxar of RJD. He is State President of Rashtriya Janata Dal of Bihar.

== Background ==
Singh hails from the Mahror branch of Rajput clan.

== Political career ==
Singh has been associated with Lalu Prasad Yadav, since the foundation of Rashtriya Janata Dal. He is a socialist class of politician and has been a founder member of RJD, the Bihar based political party. Singh had remained minister in all of the Lalu Prasad's cabinets and had defeated Lalmuni Chaubey of Bharatiya Janata Party successfully from the Buxar constituency in 2009. However, in 2014 and 2019 Singh was defeated from the same constituency by the Bharatiya Janata Party candidates. Described as a loyal member of RJD and a close companion of Lalu Prasad like another leader Raghuvansh Prasad Singh, he was among those who supported candidacy of Rabri Devi for the post of Chief Minister, following the arrest of Lalu Prasad in connection with the Fodder Scam. Singh had even campaigned against his own son Sudhakar in 2010, ensuring his defeat against the Rashtriya Janata Dal candidate. In November 2019, taking everyone by surprise, RJD appointed Singh as its Bihar state president.
