= Darbhanga Planetarium =

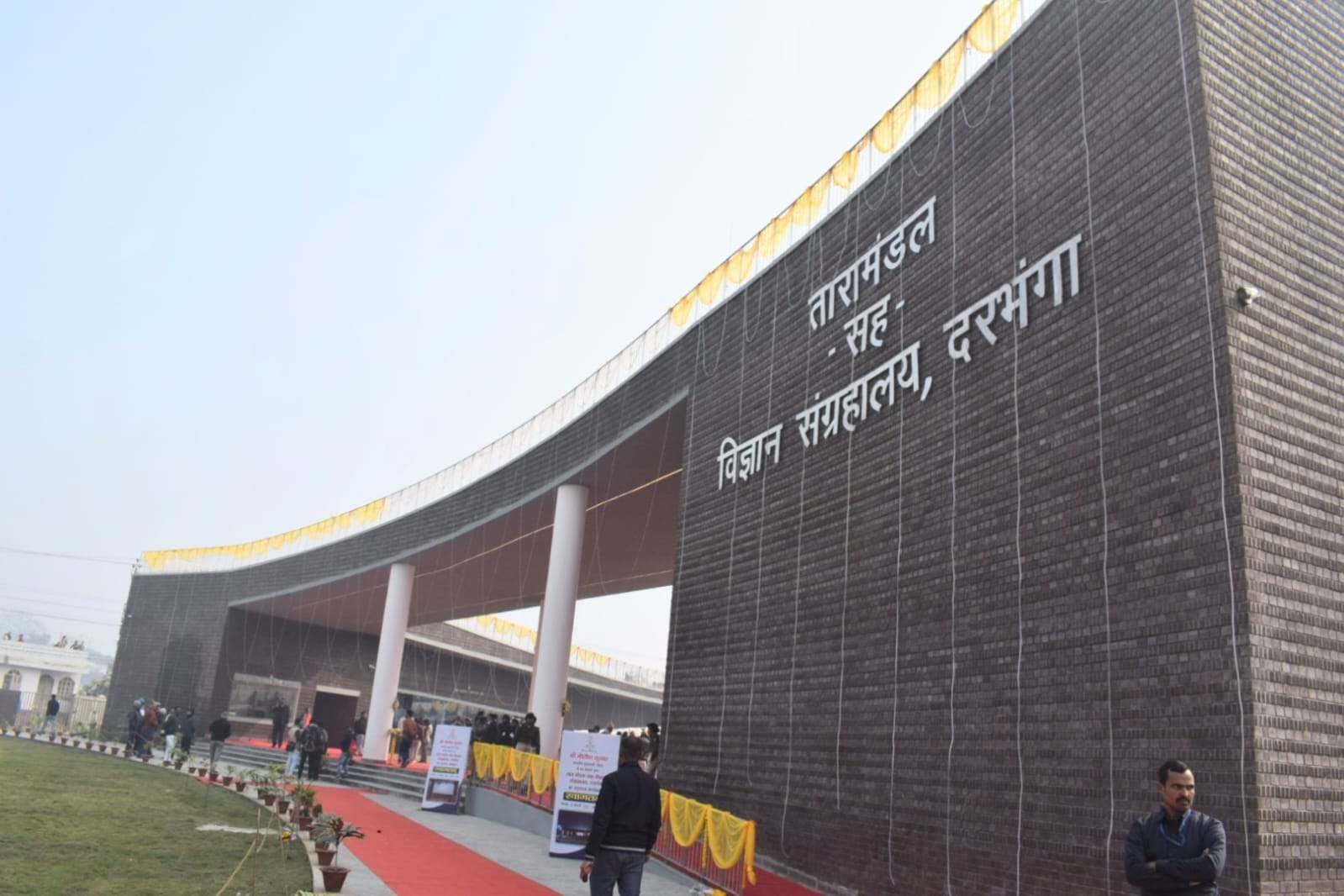
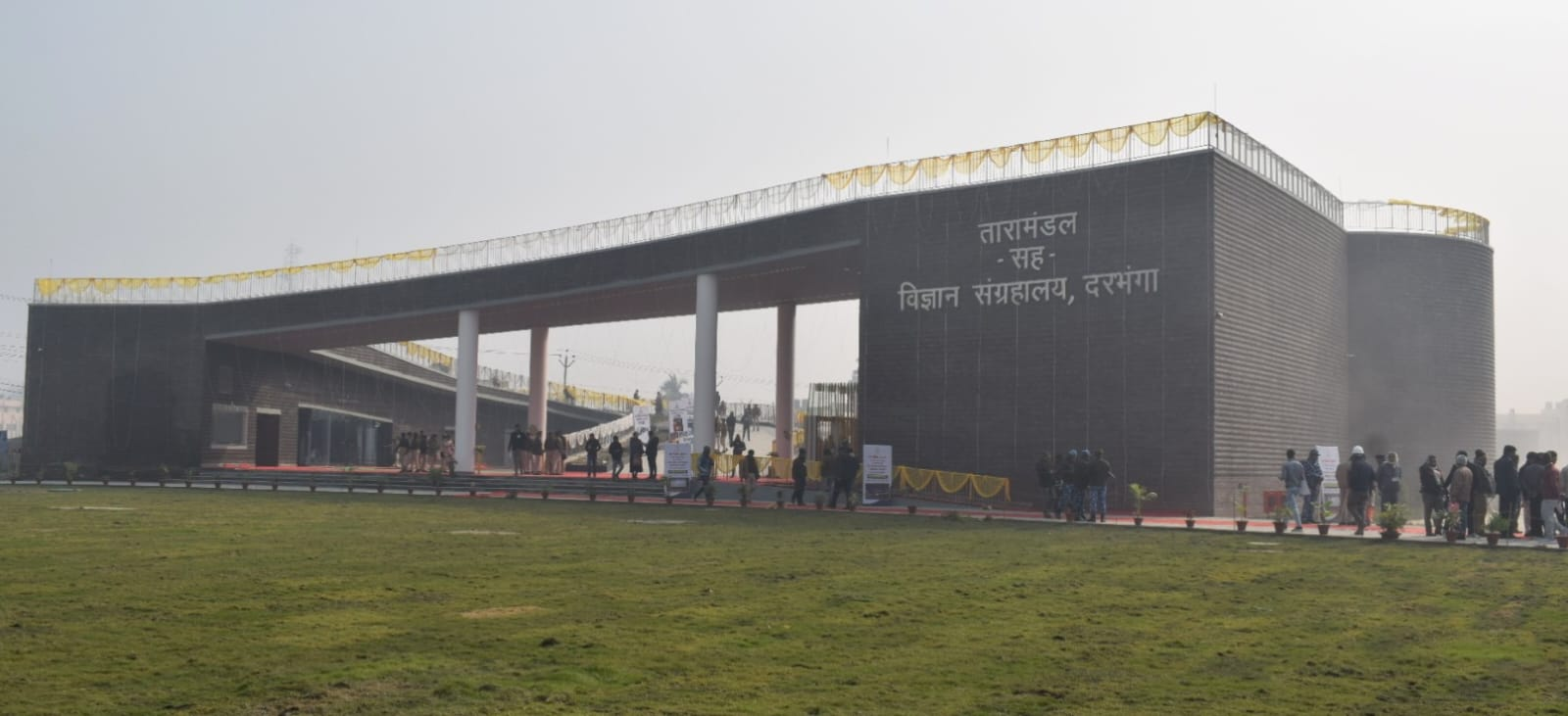
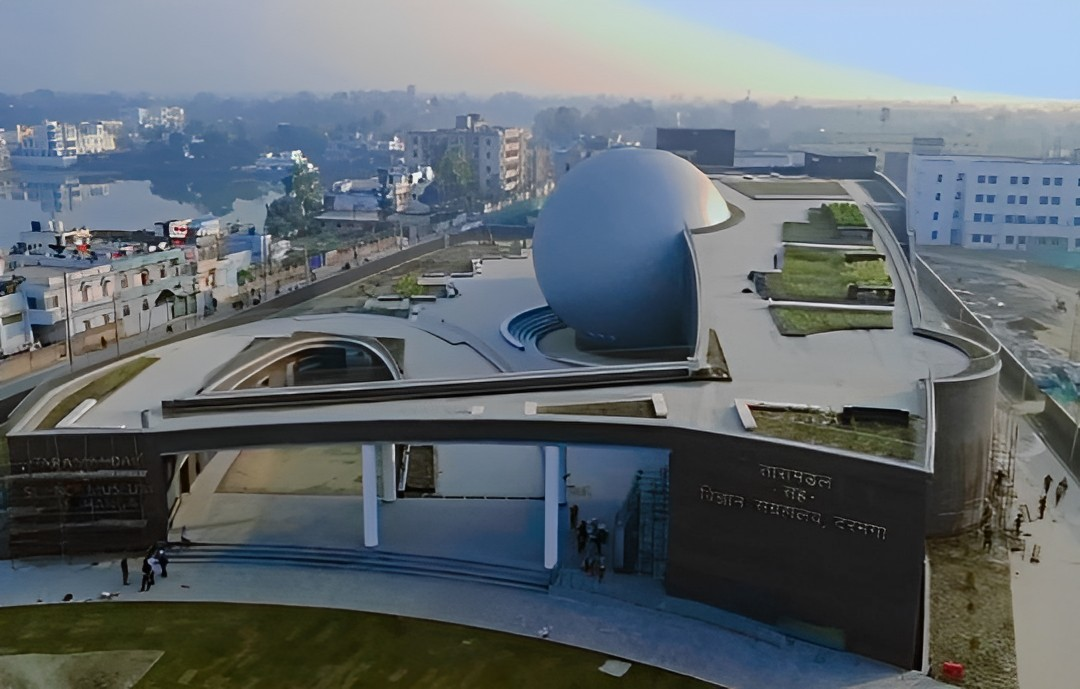
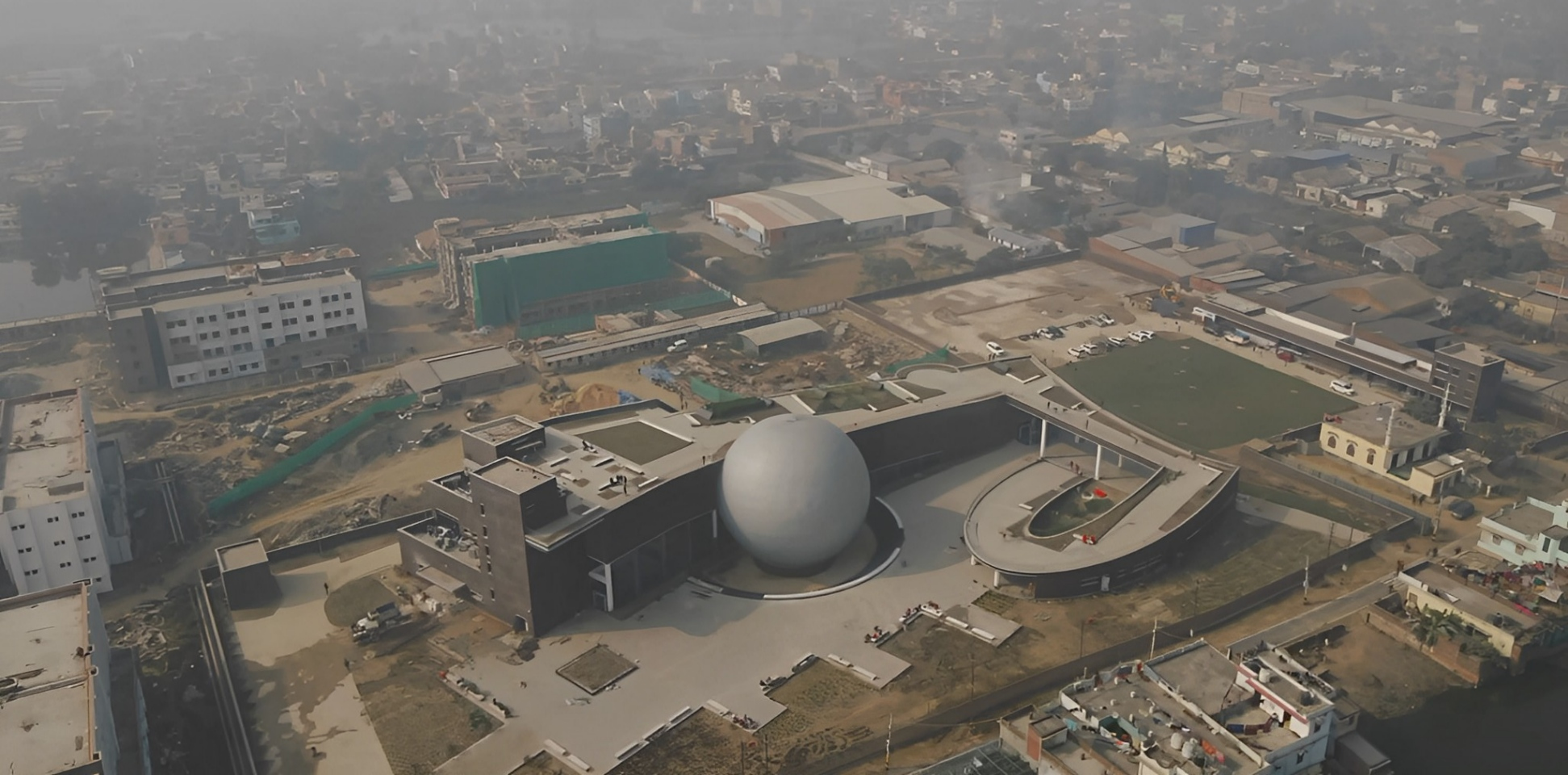
- Darbhanga Planetarium-cum-Science Museum
- Established: 12 January 2023
- Location: Darbhanga Polytechnic Campus, Darbhanga, Bihar, India
- Type: Planetarium-cum-science Museum
- Director: Government of Bihar

Darbhanga Planetarium is Bihar's second planetarium/science museum (also known as Taramandal). It was built in Kadirabad Polytechnic Ground, Darbhanga in the Indian state of Bihar.

== History ==
Darbhanga planetarium was approved by the Bihar state government in the mid 2010s as part of a broader science and technology initiative. In December 2015, the Science & Technology Minister of Bihar told the state assembly that 3 acres of land had been acquired and that an initial budget of ₹164.31 crore had been allocated for the project.

The planetarium was built on a 21,000 square meter area with a budget of ₹92.8 crore in its first phase. A total budget of 164 crore rupees was announced for construction work in 2018. The first phase was completed by December 2022.

== Planetarium features ==
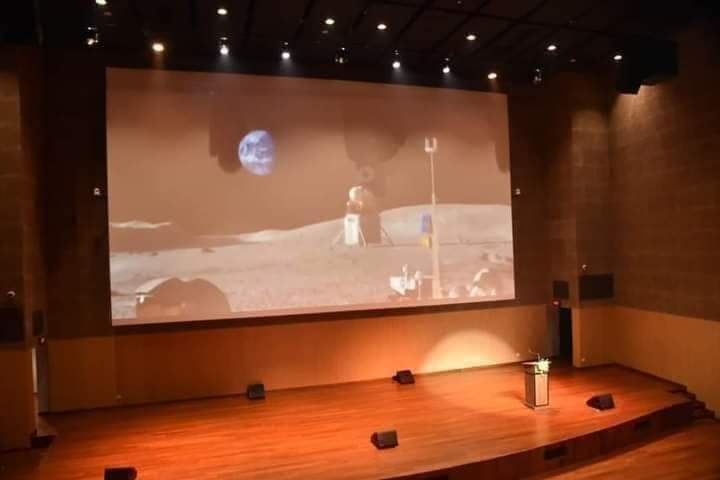
Internal view of the Darbhanga Planetarium

The design was prepared by US architectural firm Chelsea West Architects. This planetarium has 150 seats. The auditorium has 300 seats. An orientation hall with 50 seats has been built. The planetarium has three shapes: elliptical, spherical, and dome-shaped. The dome size is 14 meters. The content is to be 3D. A solar parking pathway, cafeteria, lobby, science gallery, service building, and lotus pond are included..

== Planetarium timing ==
Four Shows in a day two 2D's and Two 3D's. Ticket Booking Will Be Online.

2D show will be shown from 11:00 AM to 11:45 AM, for which the entry time of the audience is fixed at 10:30 AM.

3D show will be shown from 12:15 PM to 01:00 PM, for which the entry time of the audience is fixed at 12:00 PM.

2D show will be shown from 02:15 PM to 03:00 PM, for which the entry time of the audience is fixed at 02:00 PM.

3D show will be shown from 03:15 PM to 04:00 PM, for which the entry time of the audience is fixed at 03:00 PM.

== See also ==
- Astrotourism in India
- List of planetariums
- Software Technology Park of India, Darbhanga
