= All India Institute of Medical Sciences, Darbhanga =

Under-construction public medical college and hospital in Darbhanga, India

Coordinates: 26.1610°N 85.8328°E

- Type: Central Government Medical Institute
- Established: Under-construction
- President: Vacant
- Director: Dr. Madhabananda Kar
- Location: Shobhan-Ekmi Bypass, Darbhanga, Bihar, India
- Campus: Rural , 187 acres (76 ha)

All India Institute of Medical Sciences, Darbhanga (AIIMS Darbhanga) (IAST: Akhil Bhāratiya Āyurvignan Sangsthān Darbhanga) is an under construction public hospital and medical school located at Darbhanga, Bihar, India. It is the second AIIMS of Bihar, being constructed approximately at a cost of 1264 crores. AIIMS Darbhanga was Announced on 28 February 2015 and approved on 15 September 2020, The Government of Bihar handed over the 187 acres of land to the Central Government in 2024.

It is the 23rd AIIMS in the country, and will be constructed at a cost of ₹1264 crore.

== Description ==
AIIMS Darbhanga is a proposed medical college cum hospital being constructed at the Sobhan-Ekmi bypass near Shobhan village at the outskirts of Darbhanga city. The AIIMS will be established under the Pradhan Mantri Swasthya Suraksha Yojana (PMSSY). There will be 100 UG (MBBS) seats, 60 B.Sc. (Nursing) seats, 15-20 Super Specialty Departments and 750 hospital beds, etc. It is expected that the new AIIMS will cater around 2000 OPD patients per day and around 1000 IPD patients per month. The union council of ministers on 15 September 2020 had approved the fund of 1264 crore rupees for the construction of the proposed Darbhanga AIIMS.The Union Cabinet has sanctioned an additional ₹700 crore for AIIMS Darbhanga, raising the project’s total budget to ₹1,964 crore. This funding aims to resolve execution hurdles, facilitating the development of a 750-bed super-specialty hospital and medical college in Bihar.

== History ==
The proposal for the Darbhanga AIIMS (i.e., second AIIMS in Bihar) was announced by Arun Jaitley, the first finance minister in Prime Minister Narendra Modi's government, in the 2015-16 union budget. In 2019, Chief Minister Nitish Kumar proposed to the central government the upgradation of Darbhanga Medical College and Hospital (DMCH) as the second AIIMS in Bihar. But later the unused 200 acres of land at DMCH was proposed for the site of the proposed AIIMS. Again later the Mahagathbandhan government in Bihar change the location and proposed Shobhan village as the location of the Darbhanga AIIMS.

The AIIMS construction team of the Central Government initially rejected the location at Shobhan Village, in the name of the flood area during the survey. But after the formation of NDA coalition government again in Bihar, the central government of India approved the location of Shobhan village near the Darbhanga, for the construction of the Darbhanga AIIMS.

On 12 February, central team visited the location of Shobhan bypass near the city of Darbhanga for inspection of land and agreed to accept it as land for the proposed Darbhanga AIIMS.

The special secretary Shashank Shekhar Sinha of the health department of the Bihar Government has submitted the documents of 150.13 acres land to the executive director Dr Madhwanand Kar of Darbhanga AIIMS on 12 August 2024 for starting the construction of the proposed AIIMS. He also assured that the remaining 37.31 acres of land would be transferred soon in the next week which was transferred later on.

On 7 September 2024, Union Health Minister cum BJP president J P Nadda inspected the Darbhanga AIIMS site after inaugurating the 210-bed super specialty block built at a cost of two hundred crores in DMCH and said that very soon a magnificent AIIMS will be built at a cost of 2000 crores. The technical assistance for the construction of the Darbhanga AIIMS is sought from Indian Institute of Technology, Delhi by the Union government.

On 23 September 2024, HSCC (India) Ltd a wholly owned subsidiary of public sector construction company NBCC (India) Limited said that it has been officially appointed by the Ministry of Health and Family Welfare, as the executing agency for the construction of the new AIIMS Darbhanga. The buildings of the proposed AIIMS will be constructed on an area of more than 2.25 lakh square meters out of the allotted land. It is expected that the project for construction of the Darbhanga AIIMS will be completed in the period of three years.

On 5 November 2024, BJP's Darbhanga MLA Sanjay Saraogi told that on 13 November 2024 Prime Minister Narendra Modi will be coming to Darbhanga to lay the foundation stone for the Proposed Darbhanga AIIMS. He also said that the PM will also address a public meeting soon after laying the foundation stone for the second AIIMS in Bihar.

Finally, on 13 November 2024, after years of long wait, Prime Minister Narendra Modi during his visit to Darbhanga laid the foundation stone for the construction of the proposed AIIMS in Darbhanga. He also laid the foundation stone and inaugurated several other development projects across Bihar worth approximately around 12,100 crores.

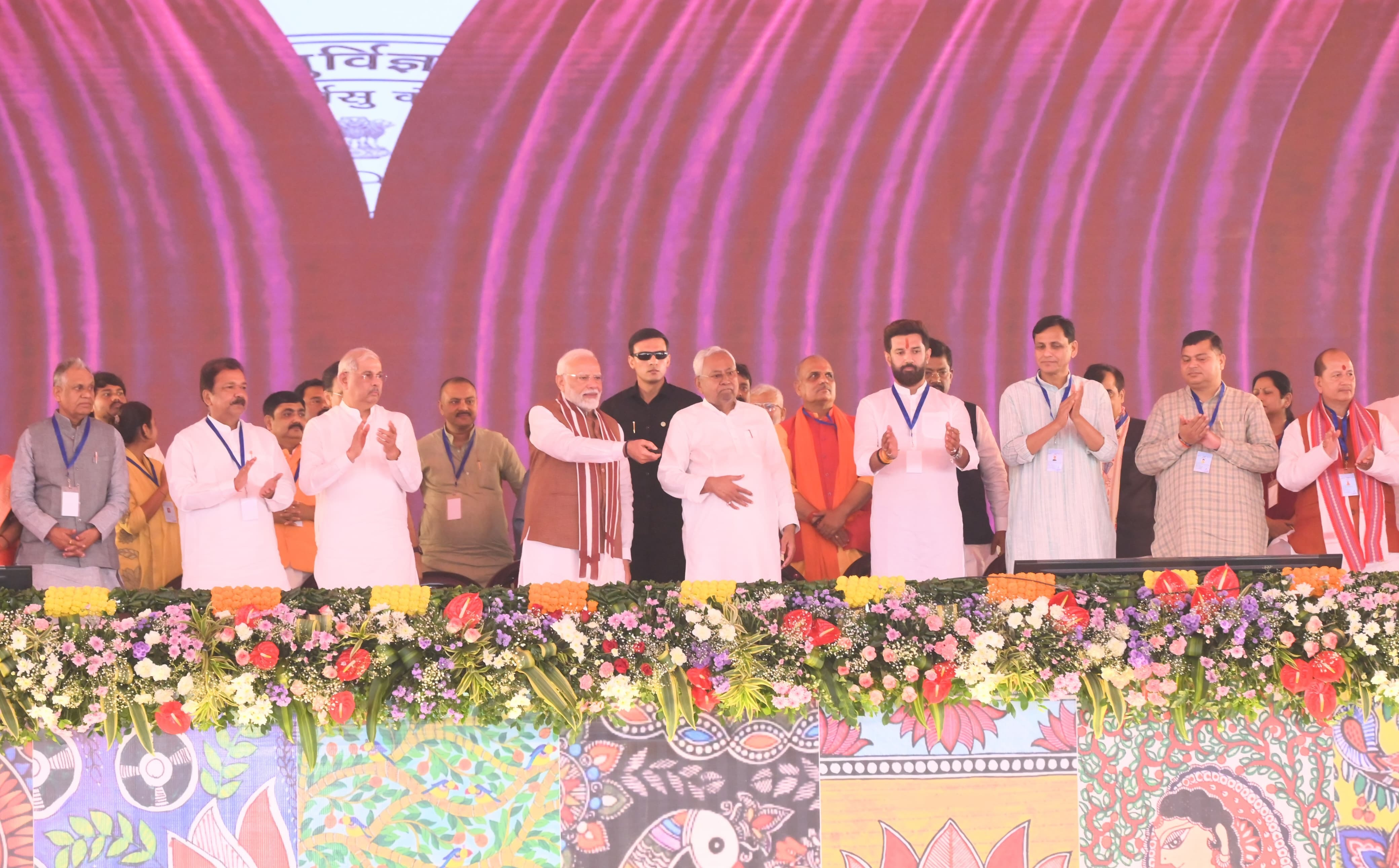
Gathering of the leaders from Bihar along with the Prime Minister Narendra Modi and Chief Minister Nitish Kumar during the occasion of laying foundation stone of the medical institute.

On 31 July 2026, Lok Sabha was informed that AIIMS Darbhanga will be completed by July 2029.

== Movements for AIIMS Darbhanga ==
Due to the political differences between the central and state government, It is the most delayed AIIMS ever constructed in India. Since there was a huge delay of several years in laying the foundation stone of Darbhanga AIIMS, therefore, Mithila Student Union launched a movement in the form of campaign in August 2021 called as "ghar-ghar se intaa laenge, Darbhanga AIIMS banaenge" which translates as "We will bring bricks from house to house and build Darbhanga AIIMS". Under the campaign of the movement, people from Darbhanga, Samastipur, Madhubani and Sitamarhi districts, etc. started collecting bricks from door to door in the Mithila region so that the foundation stone for the proposed AIIMS in Darbhanga could be laid on 8 September 2021. On 11 September 2023, Mithila Student Union (MSU) went on hunger strike demanding construction of Darbhanga AIIMS. The agitators of the hunger strike said "After Darbhanga, wherever the construction of AIIMS was announced, treatment is being provided and classes are being conducted, but eight years have passed since the announcement of Darbhanga AIIMS, not a single brick has fallen". The protesters again chanted slogans like "ghar-ghar se intaa laenge, Darbhanga AIIMS banaenge".

Similarly on 2 October 2023, BJP MP Gopalji Thakur of Darbhanga Loka Shabha started "Hunger strike" for three days, demanding the foundation stone laying and starting the construction of the Darbhanga AIIMS as soon as possible.
