= Preyansh =

Indian karateka

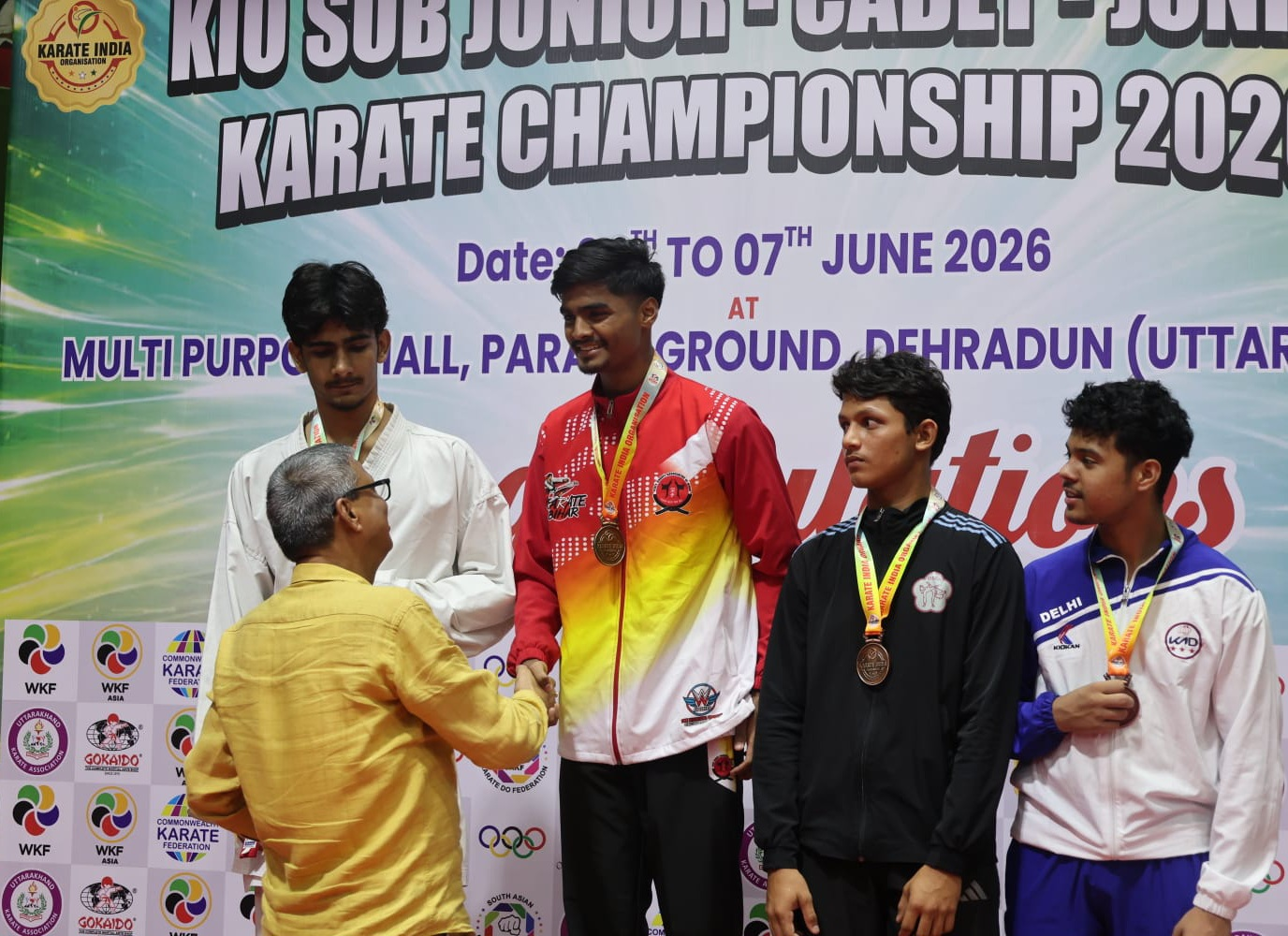
- Preyansh (centre) after winning the gold medal

Personal information
- National team: Karate India Organisation
- Born: March 3, 2009 (age 17) Darbhanga

Sport
- Country: India
- Sport: Karate
- Coached by: Mukesh Mishra
Medal record
Men's kumite
Representing India
Event	1st	2nd	3rd
Karate1 Youth League 2026, Manila, Philippines	0	0	0
Total	0	0	0
Representing Bihar
KIO National Karate Championships
Gold medal – first place	2026 Dehradun	Junior Kumite −76 kg
Silver medal – second place	2025 Dehradun	Junior Kumite −76 kg
SGFI National School Games
Bronze medal – third place	2026 Pune	Under-17 -70Kg

Preyansh (born 3 March 2009) is an Indian karateka who competes in junior men's kumite 76 kg division. He won silver medal at a national karate competition in 2025 and gold medal in 2026 organized by Karate India Organisation & bronze medal in 2026 organized by School Games Federation of India He represented India at the Karate1 Youth League held in the Philippines in 2026.

Preyansh is from Darbhanga district in Bihar, India. In 2026, he is selected to represent India at the 24th AKF Asian Cadet, Junior & U-21 Karate Championship, held in Amman, Jordan, from 8 to 11 September 2026.
