= Jyoti Kumari =

Indian girl who cycled 750 miles during COVID-19

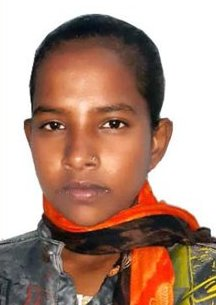
- Born: Jyoti Kumari Paswan c. 2005 (age 20–21)
- Occupation: Student
- Known for: A 1,200 km (750 mi) bicycle journey during India's COVID-19 lockdown
- Parent(s): Mohan Paswan and Phoolo Devi
- Honours: Pradhan Mantri Rashtriya Bal Puraskar 2021

Jyoti Kumari (born c. 2005) is an Indian student from Sirhulli in the rural Darbhanga district of Bihar. She came to notice after she bicycled some 1,200 km (750 mi) with her injured father to reach their home village during COVID-19 lockdowns in India. She was given a national award, and a Bollywood film was proposed to record her story.

== Life ==
Kumari was born around 2005, and is from a small village named Sirhulli in the Darbhanga district in Bihar. Her mother, Phoolo Devi, is a cook in an Anganwadi child care facility, and her father was an e-rickshaw driver.

On 25 March 2020, India imposed a lockdown to try to contain the COVID-19 pandemic. This resulted in tens of millions of out-of-work migrant workers deciding that they should journey home where they had the support networks required to look after them. Among these was Kumari's father, a rickshaw driver, but he had damaged his leg in an accident and was unable to walk. India's government had imposed different restrictions for different areas, but nationwide restrictions included travel restrictions and no interstate bus journeys. They were a long way from their homes and Kumari proposed to cycle home. With their last money they bought a girl's bicycle and despite Kumari's father's doubts they set off on 8 May 2020.

The journey from Gurugram to Sirhulli in Bihar is at least 699 miles by road.

Spectators were surprised to find a large man sitting on the seat of a bicycle while his much smaller daughter did the pedalling. They did have a short lift in a lorry, but they travelled about 100 miles each day. Some say that there may have been more than one lift but the journey was still significant and she was described as travelling for 1,200 km (750 mi) with her father from Gurugram to Sirhulli in Bihar.

This act of bravery was praised by the Senior Advisor to the President of the United States, Ivanka Trump, and Prime Minister Narendra Modi. Other well wishers and VIPs were outside her house when the story was published. The crowd was criticised for not following India's social distancing rules whilst giving her gifts.

Even though there were several promises to help her attend school, Jyoti has still not been admitted into any secondary or higher secondary school.

Kumari was conferred the 2021 Pradhan Mantri Rashtriya Bal Shakti Puraskar for bravery in the times of pandemic by the President of India. Jyoti was invited to appear for cycling trials at the All India Cycling Federation because she was a plausible selection for the Indian cycling team. The New York Times, in reports on Jyoti, referred to her as the "lionhearted girl… inspiring a nation".

== Film proposal ==
It was reported by India Today that Jyoti would play the lead role for a proposed Bollywood movie on her journey with her ailing father back home. The journey would be from Gurugram to Darbhanga, but it would also include fictionalised incidents to develop the story.
