= Darbhanga Assembly constituency =

Coordinates: 26°08′58″N 85°51′03″E

Darbhanga
- Constituency No. 83 - for the Bihar Legislative Assembly

Constituency details
- Country: India
- Region: East India
- State: Bihar
- District: Darbhanga
- Lok Sabha constituency: Darbhanga
- Established: 1951
- Total electors: 325,503
- Reservation: None

Member of Legislative Assembly
- 18th Bihar Legislative Assembly
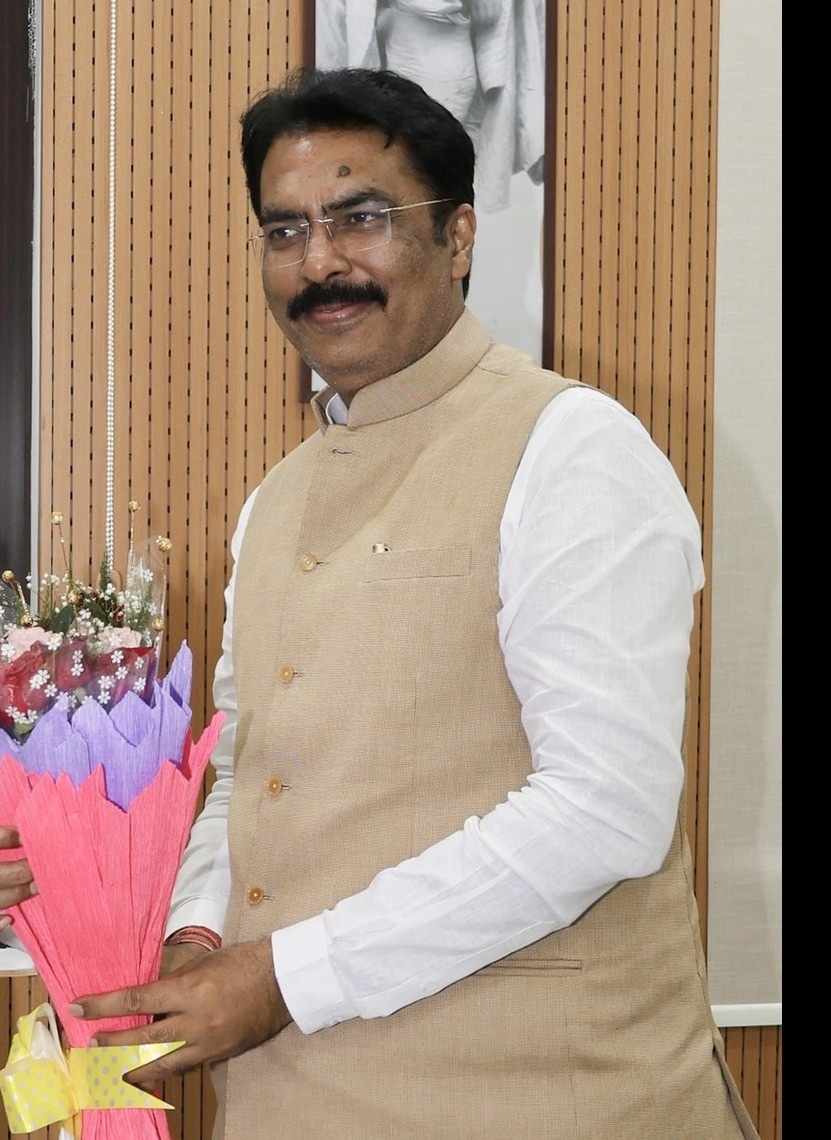
- Incumbent Sanjay Saraogi
- Party: BJP
- Alliance: NDA
- Elected year: 2025

Darbhanga Assembly constituency is an assembly constituency in Darbhanga district in the Indian state of Bihar.

== Overview ==
As per Delimitation of Parliamentary and Assembly constituencies Order, 2008, No. 83 Darbhanga Assembly constituency is composed of the following: Darbhanga municipal corporation; Kabir Chak, Kansi, Ranipur, Sara Mahamad, Shisho East, Shisho West, Basudeopur, Sahbajpur gram panchayats of Darbhanga community development block.

Darbhanga Assembly constituency is part of No. 14 Darbhanga (Lok Sabha constituency).

== Members of the Legislative Assembly ==
Year	Name	Party
1952	Sayeedul Haque	Indian National Congress
1967	R.P. Sinha	Indian National Congress
1969	Ram Vallash Jalan	Communist Party of India
1972	Surendra Jha 'Suman'	Bharatiya Jana Sangh
1977	Shiv Nath Verma	Janata Party
1980	Abdul Sami Nadvi	Indian National Congress (I)
1985	Asfak Ansari	Indian National Congress
1990	Kameshwar Purve	Janata Dal
1995	Shiv Nath Verma	Bharatiya Janata Party
2000	Sultan Ahmed	Rashtriya Janata Dal
2005	Sanjay Saraogi	Bharatiya Janata Party
2010	Sanjay Saraogi	Bharatiya Janata Party
2015	Sanjay Saraogi	Bharatiya Janata Party
2020	Sanjay Saraogi	Bharatiya Janata Party
2025	Sanjay Saraogi	Bharatiya Janata Party

== Election results ==
=== 2025 ===
Bihar Legislative Assembly Election, 2025: Darbhanga
Party	Candidate	Votes	%	±%
BJP	Sanjay Saraogi	97,453	49.66	+0.34
VIP	Umesh Sahani	72,860	37.13	
JSP	Rakesh Mishra	11,758	5.99	
NCP	Md Nafisul Haque	2,314	1.18	
Akhil Bharatiya Socialist Party	Md Shaquib Najmi	1,856	0.95	
NOTA	None of the above	1,468	0.75	+0.36
Majority		24,593	12.53	+6.29
Turnout		196,236	60.29	+4.5
BJP hold		Swing		

=== 2020 ===
Bihar Assembly election, 2020: Darbhanga
Party	Candidate	Votes	%	±%
BJP	Sanjay Saraogi	84,144	49.32	+1.66
RJD	Amar Nath Gami	73,505	43.08	−0.01
Independent	Shankar Kumar Jha	2,757	1.62	
Independent	Mahendra Lal Das	2,152	1.26	
JP	Sujeet Kumar Chaudhary	2,093	1.23	
NOTA	None of the above	669	0.39	−0.36
Majority		10,639	6.24	+1.67
Turnout		170,606	55.79	−1.96
BJP hold		Swing		

=== 2015 ===
Bihar Assembly election, 2015: Darbhanga
Party	Candidate	Votes	%	±%
BJP	Sanjay Saraogi	77,776	47.66	
RJD	Om Prakash Kheria	70,316	43.09	
Independent	Jagadish Sah	3,609	2.21	
Independent	Nilam Devi Urf Nilam Dutta	3,106	1.9	
CPI(M)	Avinash Kumar Thakur	2,223	1.36	
NOTA	None of the above	1,216	0.75	
Majority		7,460	4.57	
Turnout		163,187	57.75	
BJP hold		Swing		
