= Government Polytechnic, Darbhanga =

Public technical institute in Bihar, India

- Other names: GP, Darbhanga
- Type: Public
- Established: 1959 (67 years ago)
- Academic affiliations: SBTE
- Location: Darbhanga, Bihar, 846005, India; 26°10′08″N 85°53′39″E
- Campus: Permanent, Urban
- Website: www.gpdarbhanga.org.in

Government Polytechnic, Darbhanga is a polytechnic institute in Bihar, India. It is administered by Department of Science and Technology, Bihar and is funded by Government of Bihar. The institute is affiliated with State Board of Technical Education, Bihar which conducts the semester exams and issues the certificates.

== Courses ==
The Institute offers six-semester (three years) diploma programmes in engineering.

== Departments ==
The college has five branches in Diploma course with an annual intake of following number of students.

Courses in Diploma	Annual intake of students
Civil Engineering	60
Electrical Engineering	60
Mechanical Engineering	60
Electronics Engineering	60
Computer Science & Engineering	60

== Admission ==
Admission to the first semester (first year) diploma programme in the institute is done through Diploma Certificate Entrance Competitive Examination (DCECE) conducted by Bihar Combined Entrance Competitive Examination Board. The institute also offers lateral entry admissions to the third semester (second year) which is done through DECE (LE) conducted by Bihar Combined Entrance Competitive Examination Board.
