= Darbhanga =

City in Bihar, India

Darbhanga Dorbhanga
- City
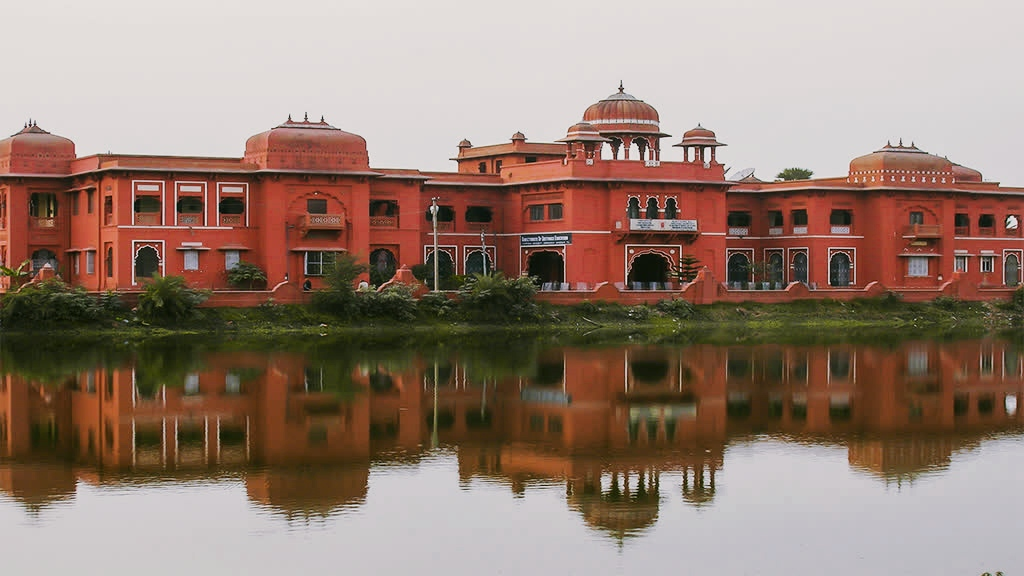
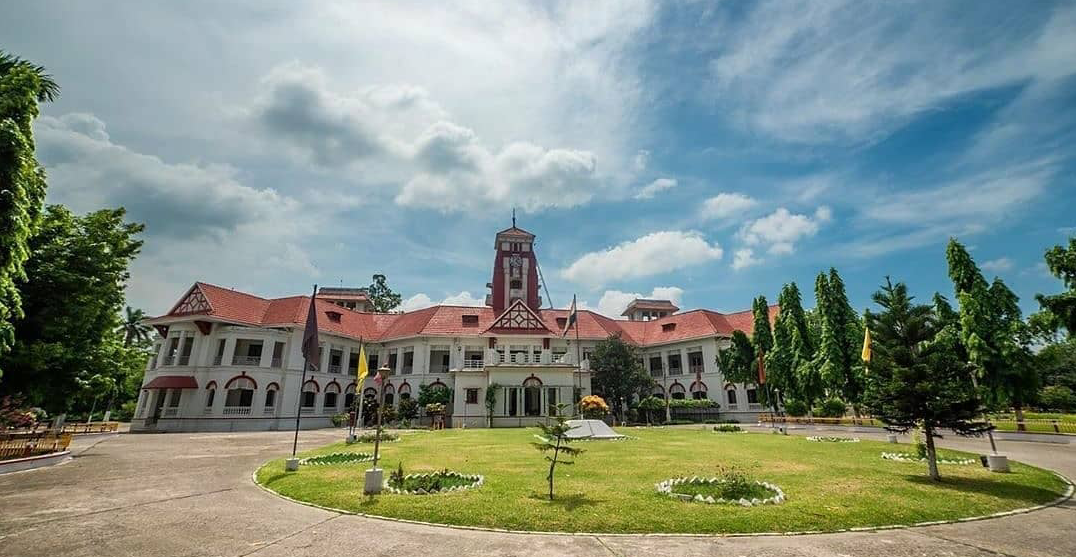
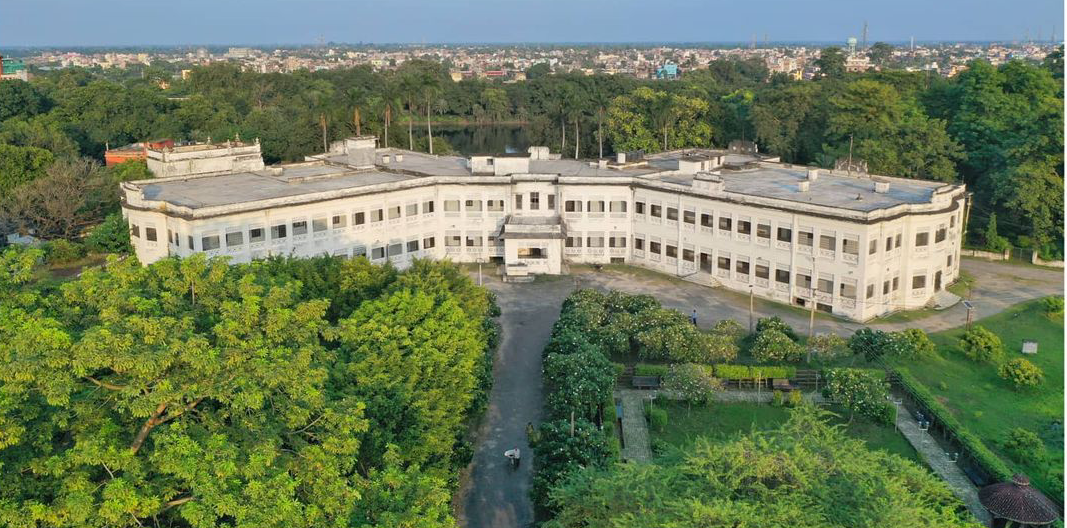
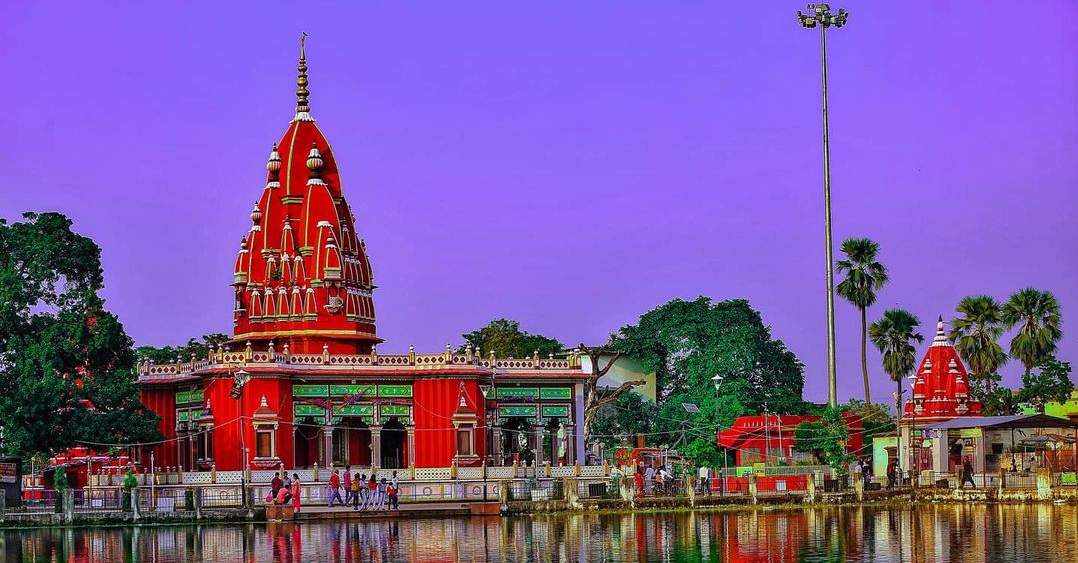
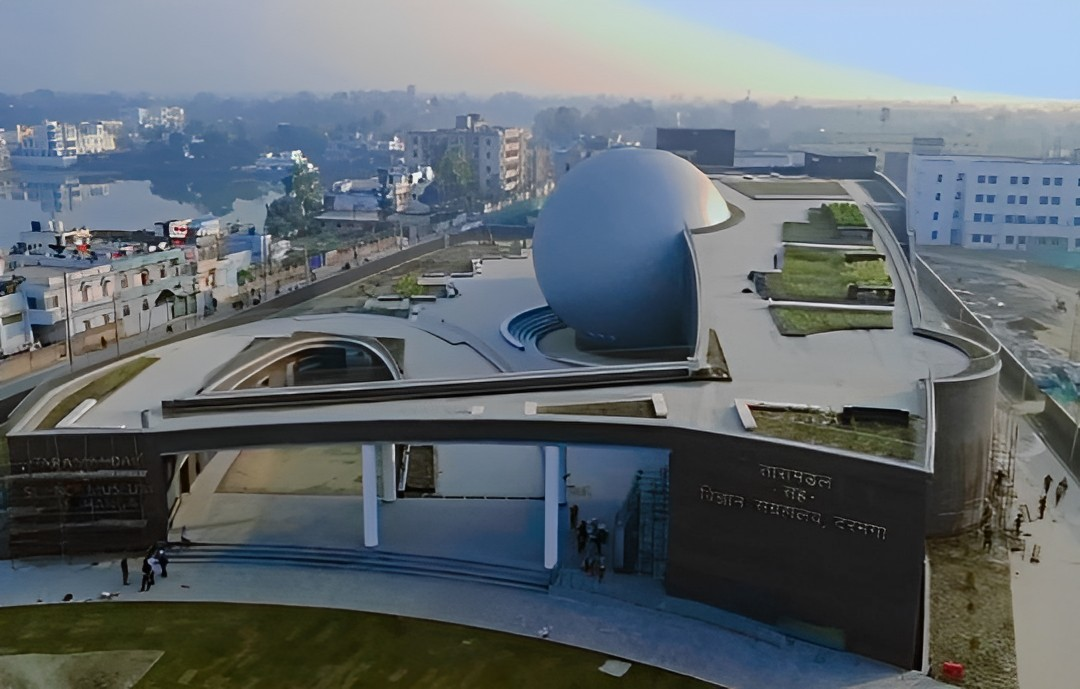
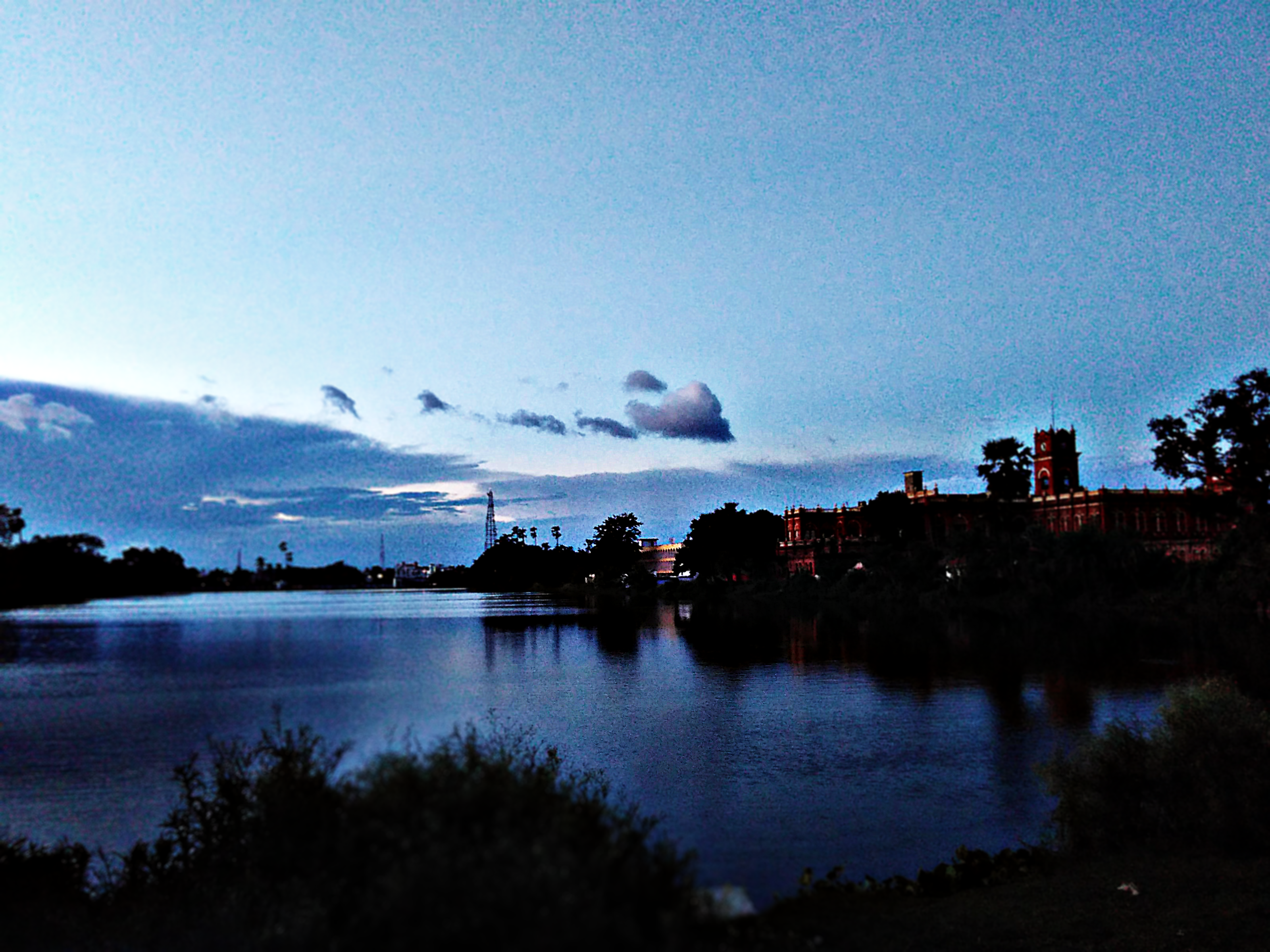
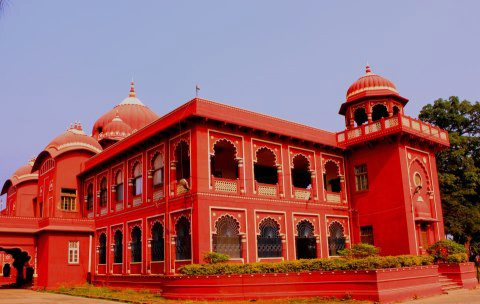
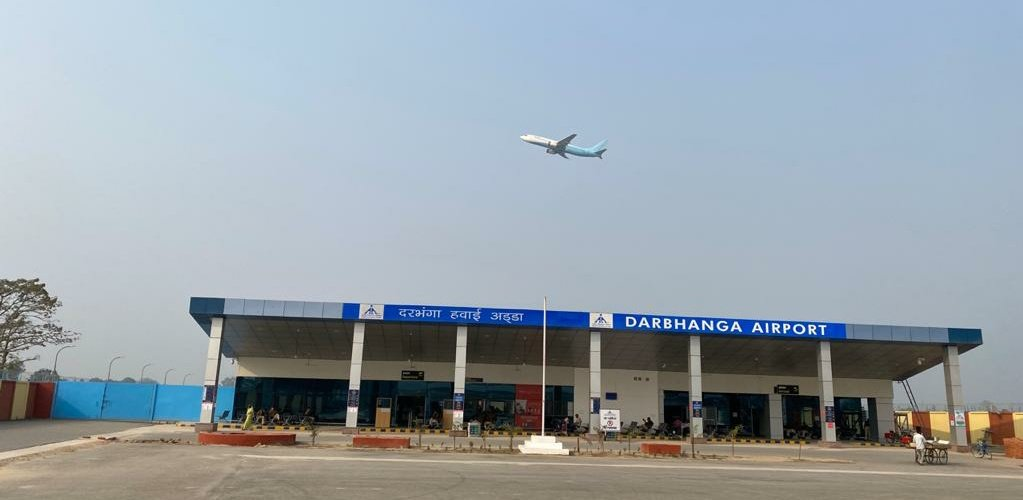
- Darbhanga Fort Bela Palace Nargona Palace Shyama Mai Temple Darbhanga Planetarium Makhnahi Pokhair Lalit Narayan Mithila University Darbhanga Airport
- Nicknames: Cultural Capital of Bihar, Heart of Mithila
- Interactive map of Darbhanga
- Coordinates: 26.17°N 85.9°E
- Country: India
- State: Bihar
- Region: Mithila
- District: Darbhanga
- Established: 01 January 1875

Government
  - Type: Municipal Corporation
  - Body: Darbhanga Municipal Corporation
  - Mayor: Smt. Anjum Ara
  - Municipal Commissioner: Shri Kumar Gaurav (IAS)
  - SP City: Shri Sagar Kumar (IPS)
  - Member of Parliament: Gopal Jee Thakur (BJP)
  - MLA: Sanjay Saraogi (BJP)

Area
  - Total: 39.83 km^{2} (15.38 sq mi)
- Elevation: 52 m (171 ft)

Population (2011)
  - Total: 296,039
- Demonym: Darbhangiya

Languages
  - Official: Hindi
  - Additional official: English
  - Regional: Maithili
- Time zone: UTC+5:30 (IST)
- PIN: 846001–846009
- Telephone code: 06272
- ISO 3166 code: IN-BR
- Vehicle registration: BR-07
- Sex ratio: 1000:910 ♂/♀
- Railway Station: Darbhanga Junction
- Airport: Darbhanga Airport
- Lok Sabha constituency: Darbhanga
- Vidhan Sabha constituency: Darbhanga, Darbhanga Rural, Bahadurpur, Keoti, Jale, Kusheshwar Asthan, Gaura Bauram, Benipur, Alinagar, Hayaghat
- Website: darbhanga.bih.nic.in

Darbhanga (pronounced [/d̪əɾ.bʱəŋ.ɡɑː/]), is one of the largest cities and municipal corporation in the Indian state of Bihar in India, and is considered an important city in North Bihar. It serves as the headquarters of the Darbhanga district and the Darbhanga division. Darbhanga is also referred to as the gateway to Bengal, because it is held that the name Darbhanga has been derived from Dwār Banga or Dari – Banga, meaning the 'door of Bengal'.

Darbhanga was the seat of the erstwhile Khandwala zamidaar dynasty under the Mughals and British India. It is considered an important medical centre of North Bihar as it is the location of the Darbhanga Medical College and Hospital, and the second AIIMS of Bihar i.e. AIIMS Darbhanga is to be constructed here. Darbhanga is the second city in the state of Bihar, where Software Technology Park of India (STPI) has been established. Similarly by the end of year 2029, it is expected that the city will be equipped with modern infrastructure of metro railway services called as Darbhanga Metro having 18.8 kilometres long metro line with 18 metro stations on it. On 29 October 2025, the union home minister Amit Shah announced to build a grand Mithila Cultural Museum in the city to preserve the cultural heritage of the Mithila region.

Darbhanga is one of the oldest cities in India. Musical, folk art, and literary traditions in Maithili, Sanskrit, Urdu, and Hindi have been passed down through generations in Darbhanga and constitute the city's strong cultural background. It is popularly known as the "Cultural Capital of Bihar" and the "Heart of Mithila", a significant district in the Mithila region of India.

== History ==
The city was the capital of the Darbhanga Raj, an estate established in the 16th century, containing the Anandbagh Palace. It was constituted as a municipality in 1864. Darbhanga is home to the Kameshwara Singh Darbhanga Sanskrit University (established 1961), which is located on the grounds of the palace, and the Lalit Narayan Mithila University (established 1972). Darbhanga has a museum housing archaeological materials, as well as historical and handicrafts exhibits.

Darbhanga has been a centre for music since the late 18th century and has produced multiple well-known dhrupad (an ancient form of Indian classical music) musicians. A major rail and road junction, Darbhanga trades in agricultural produce, mangoes, and fish. In addition to food processing, the city has a light manufacturing industry.

Darbhanga is situated on a vast alluvial plain, with low-lying areas containing marshes and lakes. Grains, oilseeds, tobacco, sugarcane, and mangoes are important crops in the region.

Under the British Raj, Darbhanga was a part of Sarkar Tirhut until 1875, when it was constituted into a separate district. Its subdivisions had been constituted earlier – Darbhanga Sadar in 1845, Madhubani in 1866, and Samastipur (then known as Tajpur) in 1867. The city of Darbhanga is said to have been founded by one Darbhangi Khan, about whom practically nothing is known. It is also held that the name Darbhanga is derived from Dwar Banga or Dar-e-Banga, meaning the 'door of Bengal'. This etymology does not appear to be accurate as the division between Bengal and Bihar has always been held to be further to the east. Nonetheless, the region has a linguistic and cultural affinity with Bengal.

Excavation at Balirajgarh revealed brick fortifications dating back to the 2nd century BC.

== Geography ==
Darbhanga is located in the northern part of Bihar. It lies between 25.53 degrees - 26.27 degrees N and 85.45 degrees - 86.25 degrees E at an average elevation of 171 feet (52 m). Darbhanga district covers an area of 2,279 km^{2}. Darbhanga is bounded by Madhubani district in the north, Samastipur district in the south, Saharsa district in the east, Sitamarhi district, Muzaffarpur district in the west and Khagaria district in south-east. Being located in Mithilanchal, Darbhanga district has a vast fertile alluvial plain devoid of any hills. It has a gentle slope from north to south direction having a depression in the centre. Darbhanga experiences a humid subtropical climate. It experiences three main seasons which are winter, summer, and rainy seasons. May is the hottest month when the temperature reaches up to 43 °C. Darbhanga district receives an average of 1142.3 mm rainfall and almost 92% of the annual rainfall is received during monsoon.

== Climate ==
Darbhanga has a humid subtropical climate (Köppen climate classification Cwa).

Climate data for Darbhanga (1991–2020, extremes 1901–2020)
Month	Jan	Feb	Mar	Apr	May	Jun	Jul	Aug	Sep	Oct	Nov	Dec	Year
Record high °C (°F)	32.6 (90.7)	34.1 (93.4)	40.6 (105.1)	43.9 (111.0)	44.1 (111.4)	43.6 (110.5)	39.3 (102.7)	38.6 (101.5)	38.6 (101.5)	39.4 (102.9)	34.6 (94.3)	31.1 (88.0)	44.1 (111.4)
Mean daily maximum °C (°F)	23.5 (74.3)	26.4 (79.5)	30.7 (87.3)	36.3 (97.3)	37.6 (99.7)	35.7 (96.3)	33.9 (93.0)	33.9 (93.0)	33.1 (91.6)	32.9 (91.2)	30.3 (86.5)	26.1 (79.0)	31.7 (89.1)
Mean daily minimum °C (°F)	7.3 (45.1)	10.2 (50.4)	13.4 (56.1)	17.2 (63.0)	20.3 (68.5)	22.7 (72.9)	23.5 (74.3)	22.8 (73.0)	21.3 (70.3)	18.9 (66.0)	13.1 (55.6)	8.2 (46.8)	16.4 (61.5)
Record low °C (°F)	0.0 (32.0)	0.0 (32.0)	4.1 (39.4)	9.4 (48.9)	10.6 (51.1)	11.0 (51.8)	13.5 (56.3)	14.0 (57.2)	13.5 (56.3)	10.0 (50.0)	7.2 (45.0)	2.6 (36.7)	0.0 (32.0)
Average rainfall mm (inches)	12.0 (0.47)	12.5 (0.49)	10.2 (0.40)	25.2 (0.99)	45.2 (1.78)	164.6 (6.48)	280.7 (11.05)	247.5 (9.74)	197.4 (7.77)	25.4 (1.00)	2.5 (0.10)	3.3 (0.13)	1,026.5 (40.41)
Average rainy days	0.9	0.9	0.9	1.8	2.4	6.8	11.0	10.4	8.7	0.9	0.2	0.4	45.3
Average relative humidity (%)	68	63	49	56	60	70	78	79	79	73	66	67	67
Source 1: India Meteorological Department
Source 2: NOAA (humidity 1971–1990)

== Demographics ==
Religion in Darbhanga city (2011)
Religion	Percent
Hinduism	71.76%
Islam	27.76%
Other or not stated	0.48%

The 2011 Census of India recorded Darbhanga as an Urban agglomeration with a population of 296,039 while the surrounding district has 3 million people. It is the 5th largest city in Bihar in terms of the urban population. The city has 196,573 males (52.6%) and 183,552 females (47.4%). Darbhanga has an average literacy rate of 79.40%, with male literacy at 85.08% and female literacy at 73.08%. However, as per the document published on 6 March 2021 by the office of District Magistrate Darbhanga, the urban population of Darbhanga stands 380,125.

=== Languages ===
Languages spoken in Dharbhanga City (2011)
1. Maithili (50.25%)
2. Urdu (26.80%)
3. Hindi (20.98%)
4. Others (1.97%)

== Transport ==
=== Railways ===
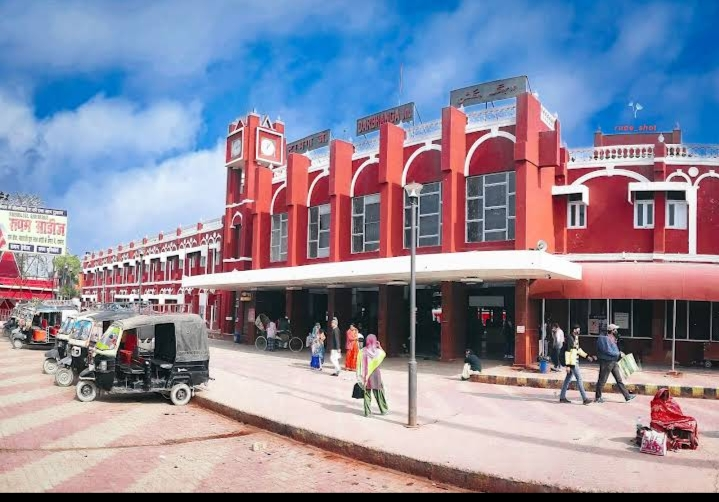
Darbhanga Junction

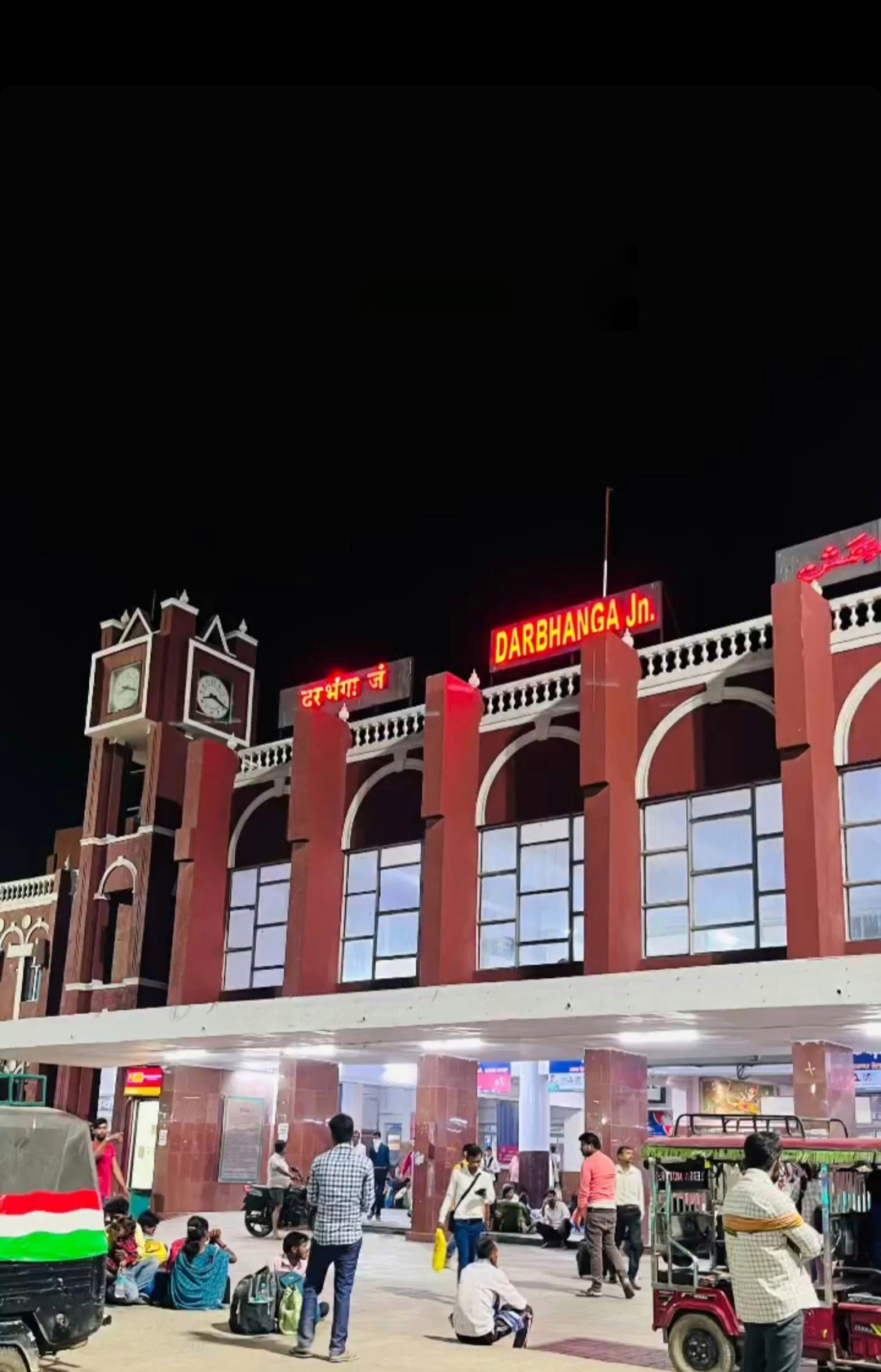

Darbhanga Junction lies on the East Central Railway. It is connected directly to all the major cities of India. Laheriasarai Railway Station is the second major station of Darbhanga and works as an important railway station for people living in south Darbhanga.

There are daily and weekly trains available for New Delhi, Patna Junction, Secunderabad, Kolkata, Varanasi, Ahmedabad, Lokmanya Tilak Terminus, Howrah, Amritsar, Pune and other major cities.

=== Darbhanga Airport ===
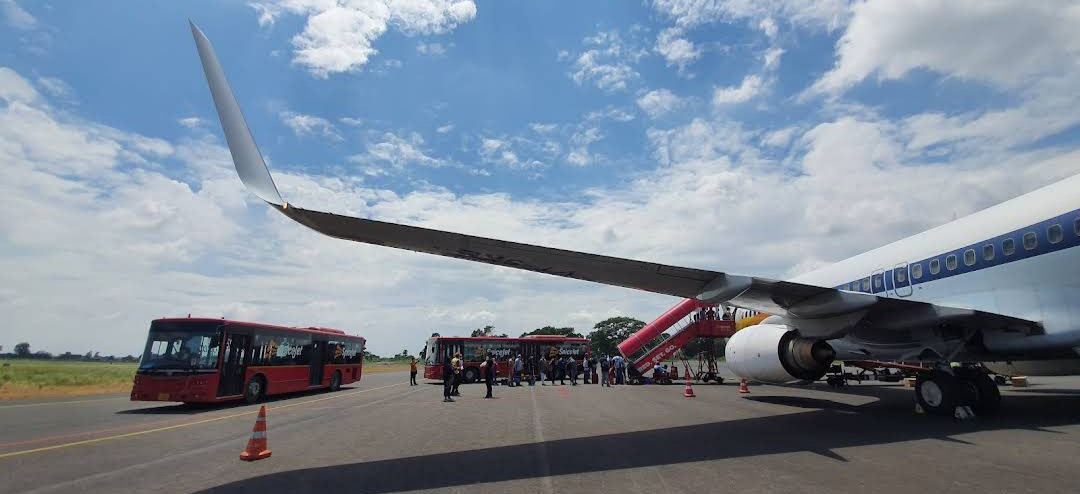
Darbhanga Airport Runway

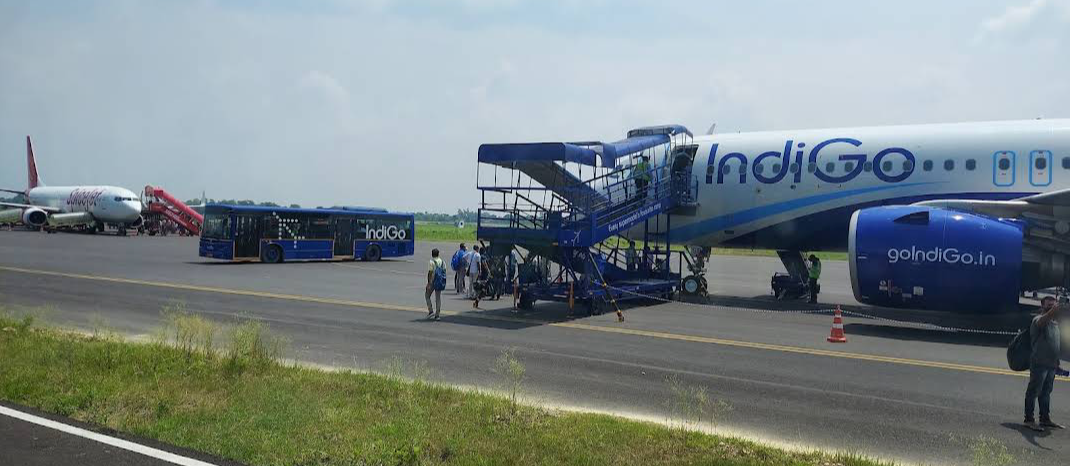
IndiGo and SpiceJet planes at the airport

Darbhanga also has its own commercial airport which is connected with all the major cities of India.

Darbhanga Airport (IATA: DBR, ICAO: VE89) is a civil enclave at the Darbhanga Air Force Station of the Indian Air Force, 6 kilometres from Darbhanga City near the NH 527B and NH 27 East-West Corridor Expressway which passes through Darbhanga. NH 27 provides road connectivity from Darbhanga towards major urban and commercial centres of northern Bihar, including Muzaffarpur, Mehsi, and other parts of the region. The civil enclave is operated by the Airports Authority of India (AAI). The foundation stone for the project was laid by Chief Minister Nitish Kumar and then Civil Aviation Minister Suresh Prabhu in the presence of state Civil Aviation Minister Jayant Sinha on 24 December 2018. After efforts taken by the MP of Darbhanga, Gopal Jee Thakur, and the then Civil Aviation Minister, Hardeep Singh Puri. Commercial flights started on 8 November 2020.

== Education ==
Notable educational institutions include:

=== Medical colleges ===
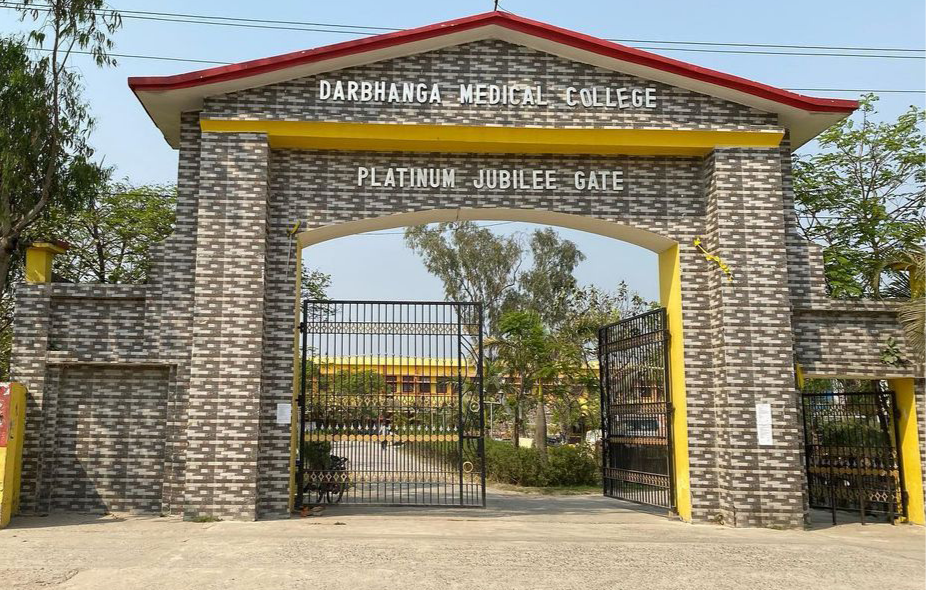
Platinum Jubilee gate of Darbhanga Medical College and Hospital

- All India Institutes of Medical Sciences (AIIMS) Darbhanga (Under Construction )
- Darbhanga Medical College and Hospital
- Mithila Minority Dental College and Hospital

=== University ===
- Indira Gandhi National Open University (IGNOU) Regional Centre
- Kameshwar Singh Darbhanga Sanskrit University
- Lalit Narayan Mithila University
- Maulana Azad National Urdu University
- Mithila Sanskrit Shodh Sansthan

=== Engineering and technology colleges ===
- Darbhanga College of Engineering
- Government Polytechnic, Darbhanga
- Software Technology Park(STPI), Darbhanga

=== Colleges ===
- C. M. Science College, Darbhanga
- Kunwar Singh College
- Marwari College
- Millat College

=== Schools ===
- D.A.V Public School
- Darbhanga Public School
- Jesus & Mary Academy

== Tourism ==
Darbhanga has various tourist attractions and is among the oldest cities of Bihar.

Tourist attractions include:

Tourist Attractions of Darbhanga
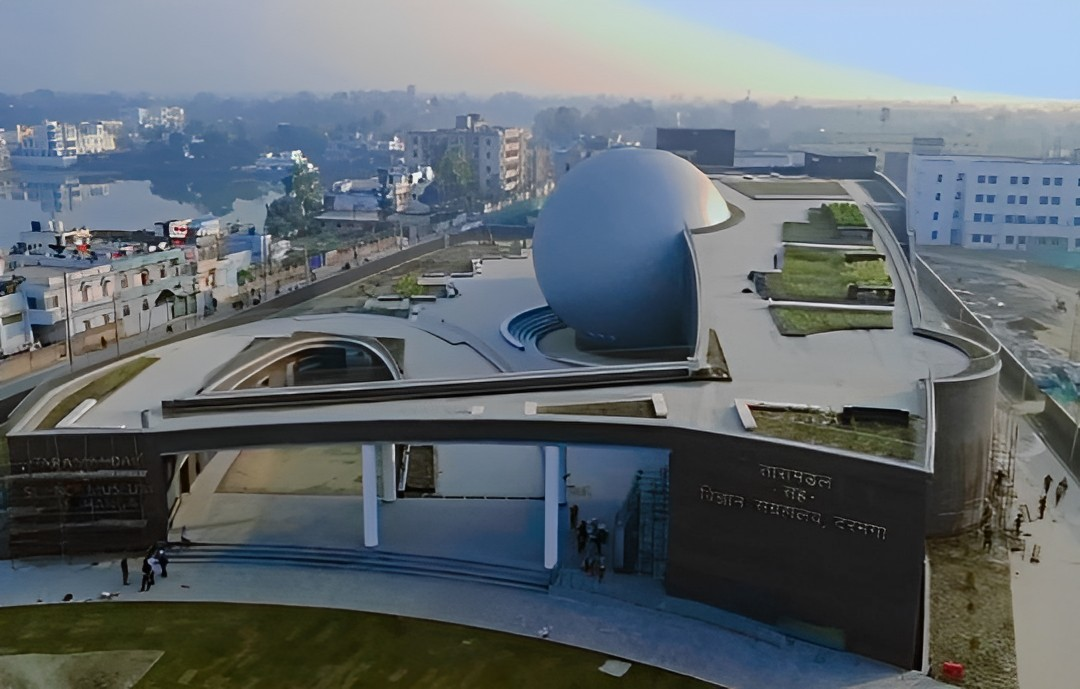
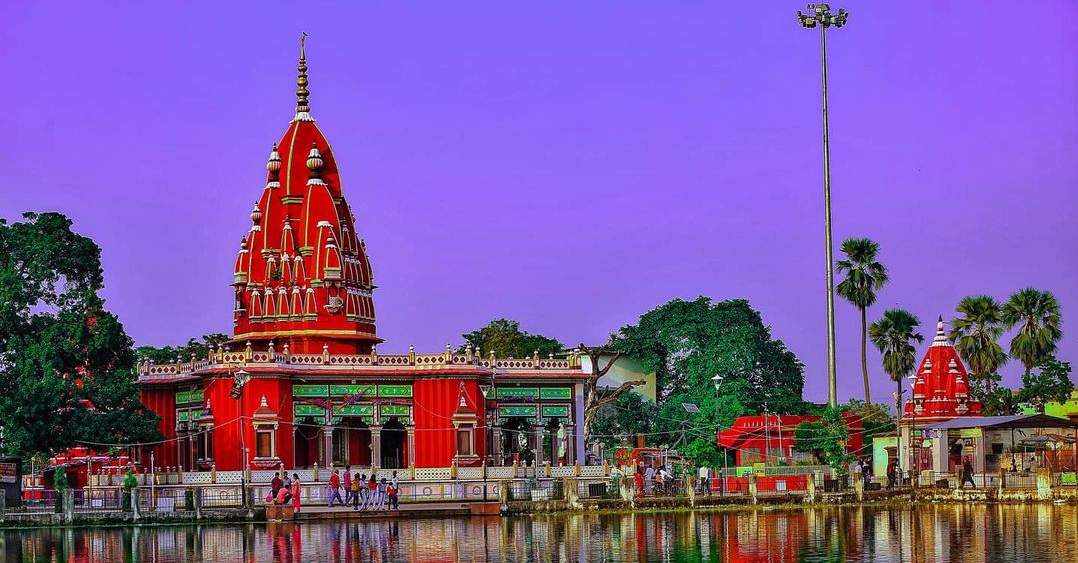
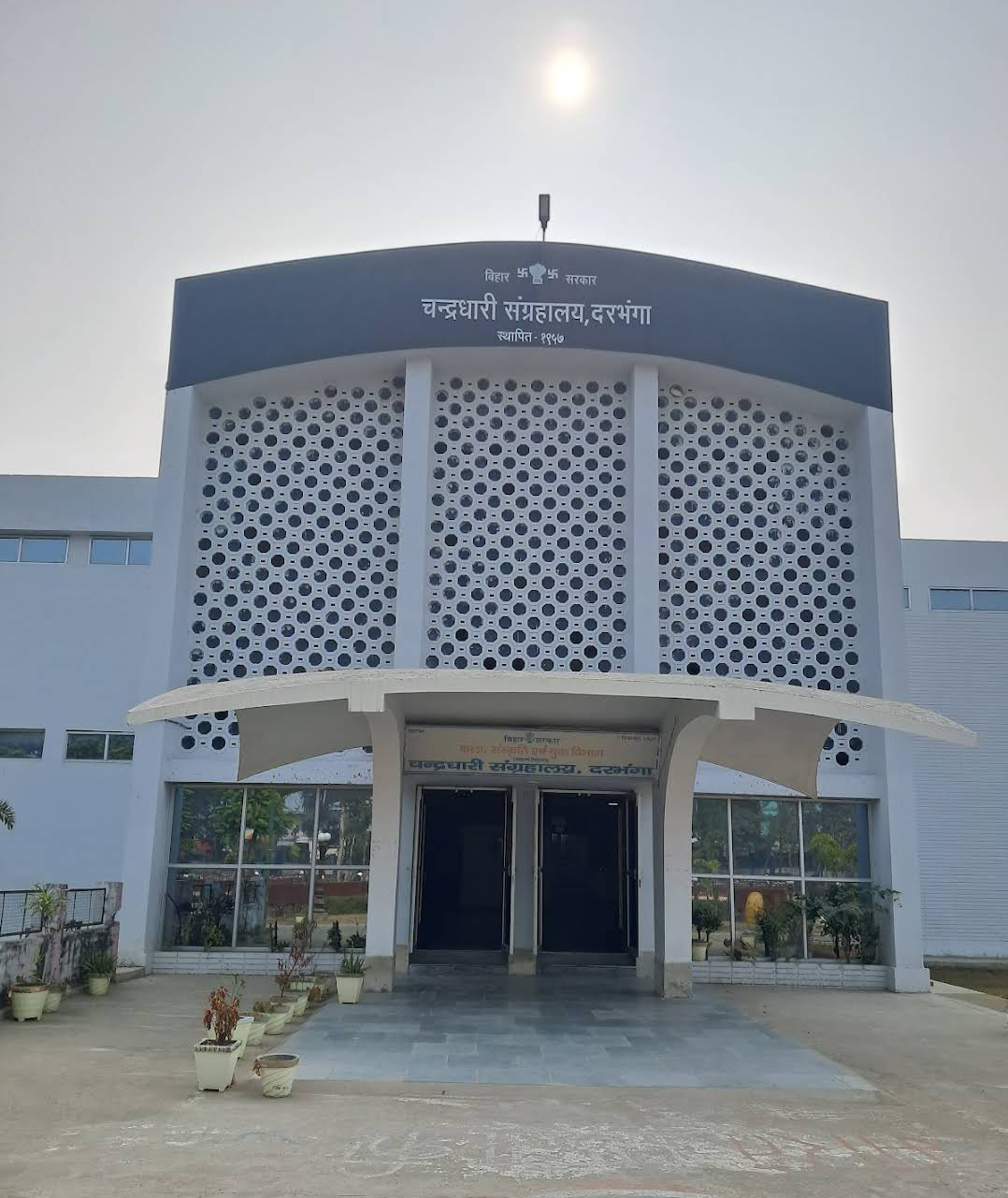
Darbhanga Planetarium, Shyama Mai Temple & Chandradhari Museum
- Chandradhari Museum
- Darbhanga Fort
- Maharajadhiraja Lakshmishwar Singh Museum
- Darbhanga Planetarium
- Shyama Mai Temple
- Nargona Palace
- Anand Bagh Palace
- Raj Darbhanga
- Ahalya Sthan
- Gautam Ashram
- Kusheshwar Asthan

== Notable people ==
- Imtiaz Ali, Bollywood director
- Kirti Azad, former MP and cricketer
- Ram Gopal Bajaj, Indian actor and academic
- Narayan Das, politician
- Veena Devi, politician and member of the 17th Lok Sabha
- Betty von Fürer-Haimendorf, ethnologist
- Gaṅgeśa (Gangesha Upadhyaya), mathematician and philosopher
- Dharmshila Gupta, Member of Parliament, Rajya Sabha
- Binodanand Jha, former MP
- Gonu Jha Pratyutpannamati
- Dr. Murari Mohan Jha, MLA from Keoti Vidhan Sabha Assembly Constituency
- Parmanand Jha, first vice president of Nepal
- Prabhat Jha, politician
- Bhawana Kanth, first female fighter pilot of India
- Yamuna Karjee, Indian independence activist
- Gul Mohammad Khan, Bangladeshi musician
- Jyoti Kumari, Sirhulli, cyclist and Bal Puraskar recipient 2021
- Ram Chatur Mallick, musician
- Sultan Ahmed Mirza former MLA
- Ramnandan Mishra, Indian nationalist who fought for India's freedom from British rule
- Sanjay Mishra, Bollywood actor
- Nagarjun, poet, writer, essayist, and novelist
- Preyansh, karate
- Ishtiaque Ahmad Qasmi Indian Islamic scholar, mufti and writer
- Tochi Raina, singer, composer, and philosopher
- Tariq-ur-Rehman, cricketer
- Ritviz, electronic singer
- Sanjay Saraogi, MLA
- Nigamananda Saraswati, Hindu monk
- Abdul Bari Siddiqui, MLA
- Kameshwar Singh, Maharaja
- Kamasundari Devi, last Maharani of Raj Darbhanga
- Lakshmeshwar Singh Maharaja
- Rameshwar Singh Maharaja
- Badri Narain Sinha, IPS
- Satya Narayan Sinha, politician
- Surendra Jha 'Suman', poet, freedom fighter, politician, essayist, literary critic, journalist, publisher and academician
- Aishwarya Sushmita, model and actress
- Gopal Jee Thakur, BJP leader and Current Member of Parliament from Darbhanga.
- H. C. Verma, physicist
- Manas Bihari Verma, Padam Shri decorated Aeronautical scientist, LCA Tejas
- M J Warsi, linguist
- Ashok Kumar Yadav, MP from Madhubani Lok Sabha constituency
- Hukmdev Narayan Yadav, former MP

== See also ==
- Darbhanga AIIMS
- Software Technology Park of India, Darbhanga
- Patna
