= Nargona Palace =

Palace in Bihar, India

Nargona Palace is situated at Darbhanga in State of Bihar, India. This Palace was the last royal Brahmin palace to be built in Raj Darbhanga.

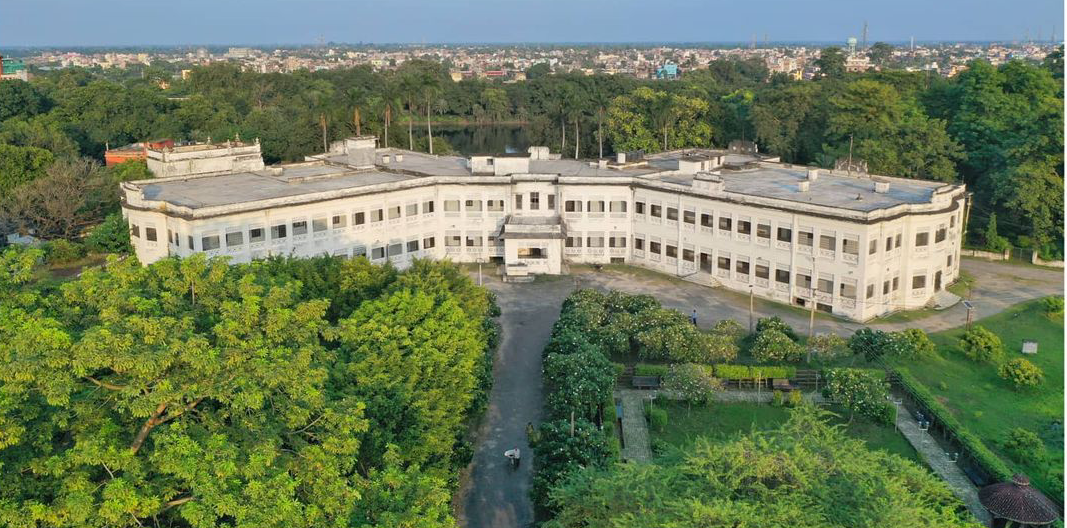

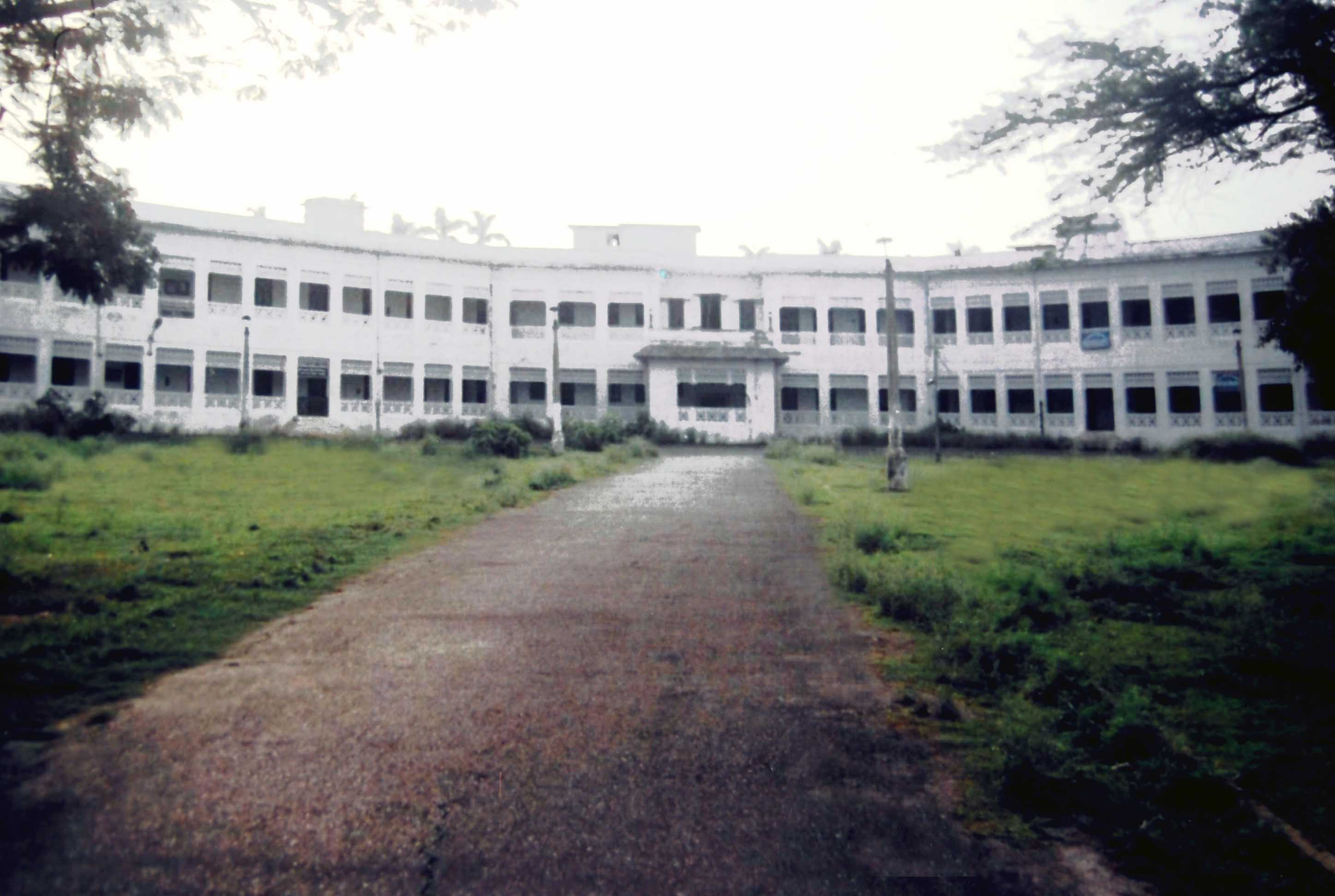
Nargona Palace

== History ==
The city of Darbhanga was one of the major cities to be destroyed in the 1934 Nepal–Bihar earthquake that rocked northern part of Bihar. Almost the entire city had been destroyed. The Palaces in Darbhanga also suffered major damage. Moti Mahal Palace was entirely destroyed in earthquake. Anand Bagh Palace and Ram Bag Palace were severely damaged and were rebuilt after the earthquake. Brahmin Rular of Mithila Maharaja Kameshwar Singh of Darbhanga then decided to build a new Palace with the best earthquake resistant technology available at that time. The Palace incorporated the best earthquake resistant features when built and its ability to withstand earthquake was demonstrated in 1988 when another earthquake rocked Bihar. It is probably the first building in India to incorporate earthquake resistant technology.

== Present Status ==
The Palace along with its surrounding garden, orchards, etc. as well as Head Office building of Raj Darbhanga was donated in 1972 to Government of Bihar for establishing a university. Now Lalit Narayan Mithila University is beneficiary of donation and functions from these buildings.
