= Darbhanga Municipal Corporation =

Civic body governing Darbhanga, Bihar, India

Darbhanga Municipal Corporation दरभंगा नगर निगम
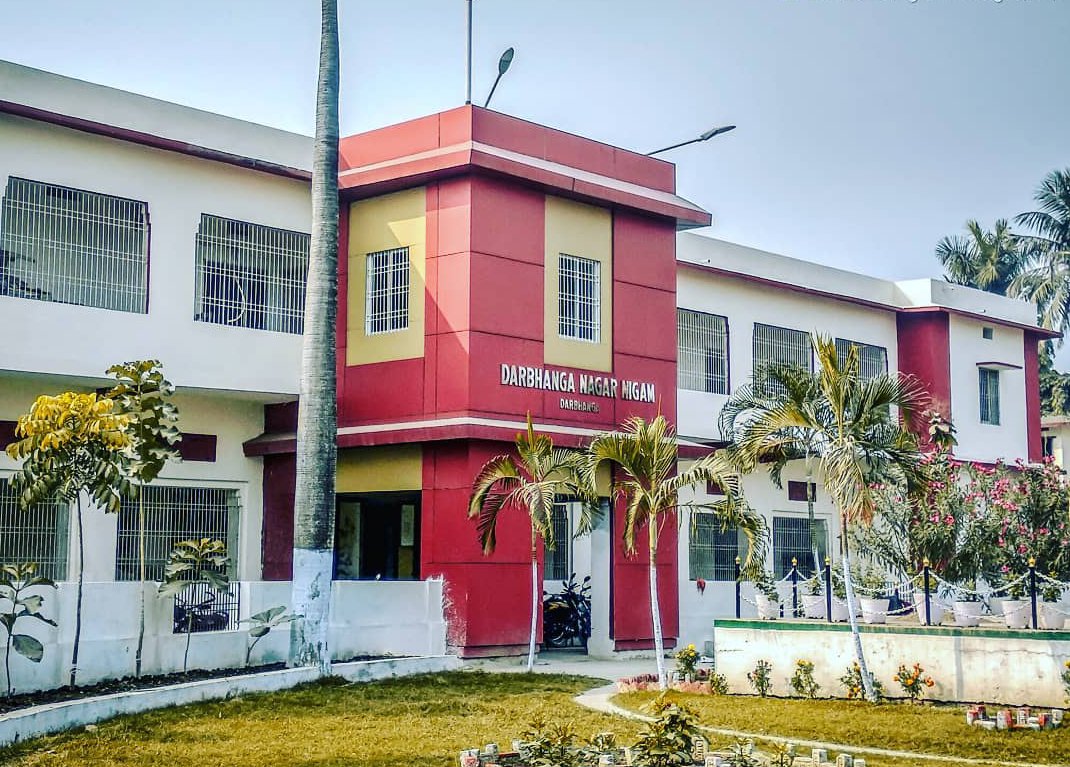
- Darbhanga Municipal Corporation

Type
- Type: Municipal corporation

History
- Founded: 1982; 43 years ago

Leadership
- Mayor: Anjum Ara
- Deputy Mayor: Nazia Hasan
- Municipal Commissioner: Rakesh Gupta (IAS)
- Seats: 48

Elections
- Last election: 2022

Meeting place
- Mirzapur, Lal Bagh, Darbhanga, Bihar - 846004

Website
- nagarseva.bihar.gov.in/darbhanga

Darbhanga Municipal Corporation or Darbhanga Nagar Nigam, is the civic body that governs Darbhanga, a city of Bihar in India. Municipal Corporation mechanism in India was introduced during British Rule with formation of municipal corporation in Madras (Chennai) in 1688, later followed by municipal corporations in Bombay (Mumbai) and Calcutta (Kolkata) by 1762. Darbhanga Municipal Corporation consists of democratically elected members, is headed by a Mayor, and administers the city's infrastructure, public services, and supplies.

== History ==
Darbhanga Municipal Corporation was established on August 23, 1982. Darbhanga Municipal Corporation covers 19.18 km^{2}. and is divided into 48 administrative wards.

== Wards ==
Zone	Ward Number	Ward Name	Areas Covered	Assembly Constituency	Councillor	Political Group
	1				Tabassum Khatoon	
	2				Jayanti Devi	
	3				Kumkum Kumari	
	4				Shyam Sharma	
	5				Puja Mandal	
	6				Narad Yadav	
	7				Ishwar Mandal	
	8				Mithilesh Rai	
	9				Rakesh Paswan	
	10				Amrita Jalan	
	11				Soni East	
	12				Mukesh Mahasheth	
	13				Rajeev Singh	
	14				Rakhi Kumari	
	15				Suchitra Rani	
	16				Gaudi Paswan	
	17				Vikash Kumar	
	18				Vishwapati Mishra	
	19				Ravi Mohan	
	20				Nusrat Praveen	
	21				Naveen Sinha	
	22				Rinku Devi	
	23				Chandni Devi	
	24				Khalid Uzma	
	25				Firoz Alam	
	26				Ajay Mahto	
	27				Manna Mandal	
	28				Jyoti Kumari	
	29				Shabana Khanum	
	30				Zeenat Praveen	
	31				Rinku	
	32				Nikhat Praveen	
	33				Israt Jahan	
	34				Poonam Devi	
	35				Pinky Devi	
	36				Firdaus	
	37				Riyasat Ali	
	38				Nujhat Praveen	
	39				Shahnaz Praveen	
	40				Poonam Devi	
	41				Shankar Prasad Jaiswal	
	42				Ambika Kumari	
	43				Nisar Alam	
	44				Rakesh Roshan	
	45				Devkrishna Jha	
	46				Raju Paswan	
	47				(Elected unopposed)	
	48				Subhash Kumar Saurabh	

== Functions ==
Darbhanga Municipal Corporation is created for the following functions:

- Planning for the town including its surroundings which are covered under its Department's Urban Planning Authority .
- Approving construction of new buildings and authorising use of land for various purposes.
- Improvement of the town's economic and Social status.
- Arrangements of water supply towards commercial, residential and industrial purposes.
- Planning for fire contingencies through Fire Service Departments.
- Creation of solid waste management, public health system and sanitary services.
- Working for the development of ecological aspect like development of Urban Forestry and making guidelines for environmental protection.
- Working for the development of weaker sections of the society like mentally and physically handicapped, old age and gender biased people.
- Making efforts for improvement of slums and poverty removal in the town.

== Revenue ==
The following are the Income sources for the Corporation from the Central and State Government

=== Revenue from taxes ===
Following is the Tax related revenue for the corporation:

- Property tax
- Profession tax
- Entertainment tax
- Grants from Central and State Government like Goods and Services Tax
- Advertisement tax

=== Revenue from non-tax sources ===
Following is the Non Tax related revenue for the corporation:

- Water usage charges
- Fees from Documentation services
- Rent received from municipal property
- Funds from municipal bonds

== 2022 Elections Results ==
2022 MCD Elections(Mayor): Darbhanga
Party	Candidate	Votes	%	±%
JD(U)	Anjum Ara	30,114	24.07	
BJP	Dharmsheela Gupta	21,380	17.09	
Independent	Nirmata Nayak	18,483	14.77	
Independent	Madhubala Sinha	18,349	14.66	
Independent	Anjani Devi	11,270	9.00	
Independent	Reeta Singh	10,945	8.74	
Independent	Seema Kumari	4,723	3.77	
Independent	Meena Kumari	3,362	2.68	
Independent	Radha Devi	2,065	1.65	
Independent	Angoori Khatoon	2,008	1.60	
Independent	Reena Devi	1,377	1.10	
Independent	Sangeeta Vihari	1,010	0.80	
Majority		8,734	7.09	
Turnout		1,23,227	na	na
JD(U) win		Swing		

2022 MCD Elections(Deputy Mayor): Darbhanga
Party	Candidate	Votes	%	±%
INC	Nazia Hasan	31,927	25.53	
Independent	Archana Jha	28,083	22.46	
Independent	Pinki Devi	17,072	13.65	
Independent	Asha Devi	16,236	12.98	
Independent	Yamuna Devi	9,858	7.88	
Independent	Sumitra Devi	6,612	5.28	
Independent	Renu Kumari	4,766	3.81	
Independent	Zafar Fatma	3,847	3.07	
Independent	Sonali Devi	3,597	2.87	
Independent	Rita Thakur	3,029	2.42	
Majority		3,844	3.07	
Turnout		1,25,027	na	na
INC win		Swing		
