= Darbhanga Public School =

School in Darbhanga, Bihar, India

Coordinates: 26.2175°N 78.1672°E

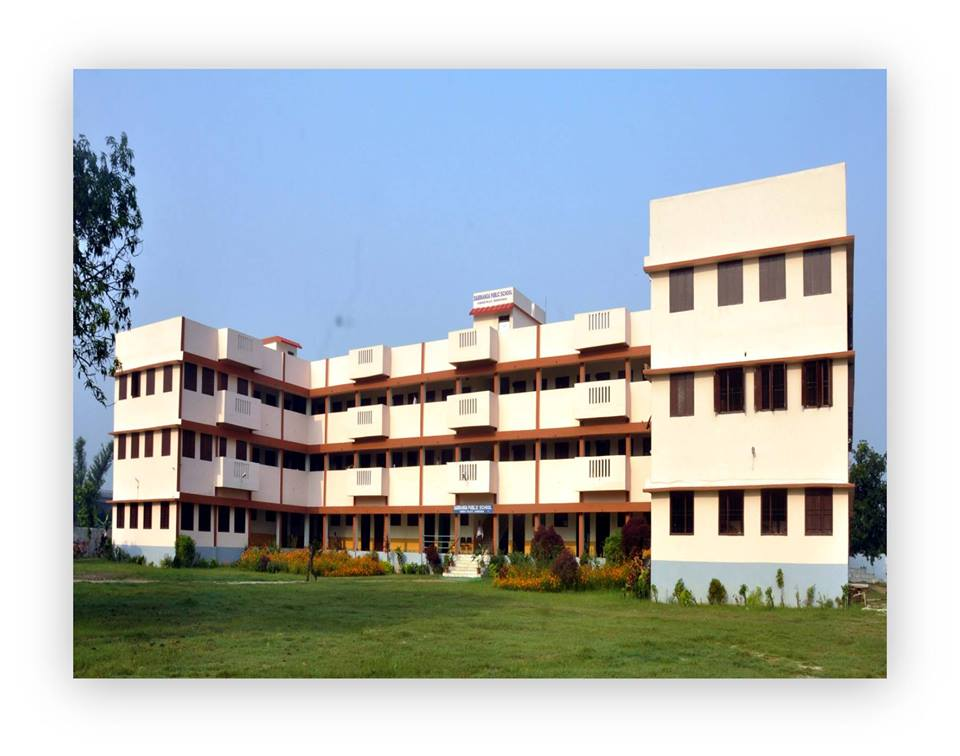
- Near Dilli More; Darbhanga, Bihar, India; India

Information
- School type: Private School
- Motto: "Manifestation of Perfection"
- Religious affiliation: secular
- Founded: 2000
- Founder: Lal Mohan Jha
- School board: CBSE
- Director: Vishal Gaurav
- Principal: Madan Kumar Mishra
- Student to teacher ratio: 1:10
- Classes offered: Class I to Class XII
- Language: English
- Classrooms: Modern Smart class rooms
- Campus size: 5 acres
- Affiliation: CBSE
- Website: www.dapsdbg.com

Darbhanga Public School is an Indian CBSE affiliated English medium co-educational school of the district (Darbhanga) and Mithila, established on 5 January 2000. The region has been an ancient seat of learning. The school was established by a team of people.

The students in the school are divided into four houses:

Houses
Newton
Shakespeare
Tansen
Gandhi

== About the school ==
The school has a history of over 15 years in the space of education. It was started by a team of educationists The Darbhanga Public School was founded by Dr. Lal Mohan Jha who was the principal of C.M.Science College and ex-director of Women's Institute of Technology, who is currently chairman of the school. In last 18 years; the school has established itself as a premier education center of entire Mithilanchal. Over 2000 alumni of the school today are working across the globe.

== Motto of the school ==
The motto of the School is - “Manifestation of Perfection” The motto is derived from a famous quote by Swami Vivekananda – “Education is the manifestation of perfection already present in man”. Something is said to be manifested only when it finds an expression.
