= Shyama Mai Temple =

Hindu temple in India

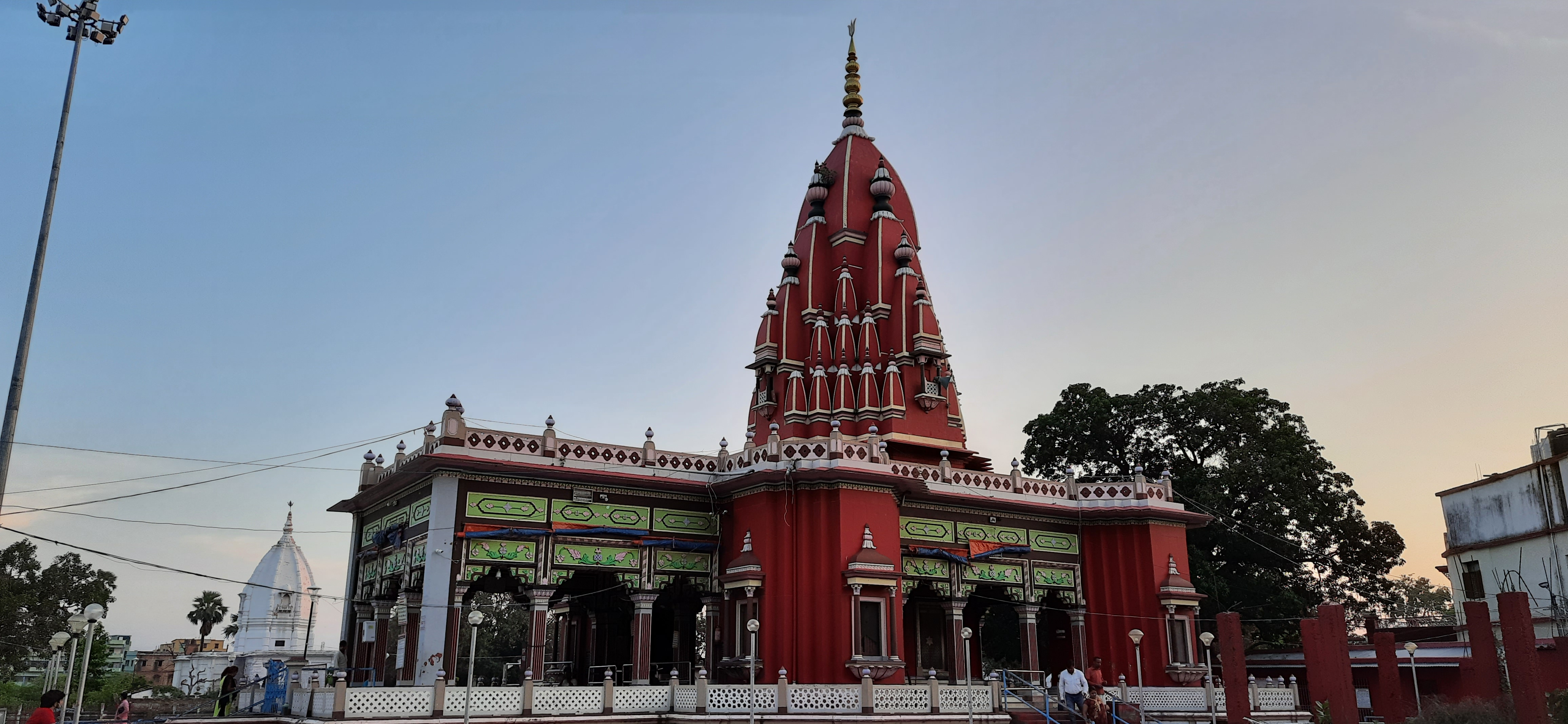
- View of Shyama Mai Temple, Darbhanga

- Location within Bihar Location within India Location within Asia

Religion
- Affiliation: Hinduism
- District: Darbhanga
- Deity: Kali
- Festival: Navaratri

Location
- Location: Kathalbari
- State: Bihar
- Country: India
- Coordinates: 26°09′37.8″N 85°53′59.5″E

Architecture
- Type: Hindu Temple
- Style: Nagara Style Architecture
- Creator: Maharaja Sir Kameshwar Singh
- Established: 1933

Mother Kali's Dham Shyama Kali temple is a Hindu temple, built on the pyre in Darbhanga, Bihar. A large number of devotees visit here and all Manglik works are also done. This temple is known as Shyama Mai's temple. Shyama Mai's temple is built on the pyre of Maharaja Rameshwar Singh at the crematorium Ghat and is an unusual occurrence in itself. Maharaja Rameshwar Singh was one of the seeker kings of the Darbhanga royal family. Due to the name of the king, this temple is known as Rameshwari Shyama Mai. The temple was founded by Maharaj Kameshwar Singh of Darbhanga in 1933.

== Festivals ==
In the sanctum sanctorum, a huge statue of Maa Kali is installed on the right side of Mahakal and Ganapati andBatukabhairava Dev on the left. The Mund Mala around the neck of the mother has the equivalent of the letters of the Hindi alphabet. Devotees believe that this is because the Hindi alphabet is a symbol of creation. Aarti held in the temple has special significance. Devotees who come here wait for hours to join the temple aarti. During Navratri, the number of devotees increases and a fair is held here.

== History ==
The statue of mother was brought and came from Paris. Visiting the feet of Mother Shyama Kali fulfills every wish of the devotees. On the part of the mother, there is a delectable Raktim or yellow cloth. This idol of Maa Kali is of four arms, with the right hand always blesses the visiting refugees.

== Legends ==
In this temple, mother Kali is worshiped with both Vedic and Tantric methods. Usually in Hinduism the couple does not go to the cremation ground until after 1 year of marriage. But in this temple built in the cremation ground, not only newlyweds come to seek blessings, but weddings are also done in this temple. Experts say that Shyama Mai Mata is the form of Sita. Laldas, who was a servant of King Rameshwar Singh, has explained this in the Rameshwar Charit Mithila Ramayana. It is derived from the Ramayana composed by Valmiki. It is told that after Ravana was killed, Mother-Sita told Lord Rama that whoever slays Sahastraanan will be the real hero.

On this, Lord Rama went out to kill him. During the war, Lord Rama got an arrow from Sahastraanan. Mother Sita became very angry on this and killed Sahastraanan. Mother's color turned black with anger. Even after the slaughter, her anger did not calm down, so Lord Shiva himself had to come to stop him. As soon as the feet were placed on the Lord's chest, the mother was very ashamed and the tongue came out of her mouth. This form of Mother is worshiped and she is called here as Kali not Shyama.

== Gallery ==
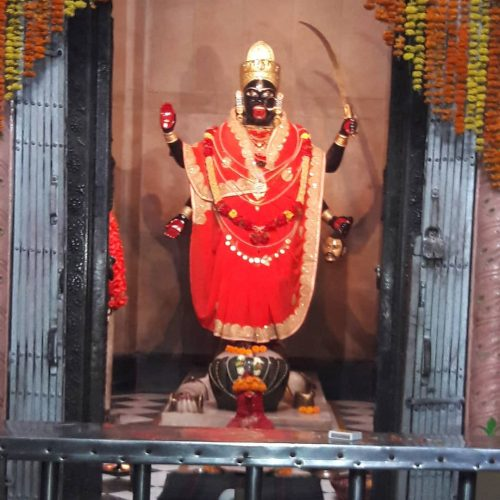
View of Shyama Mai Temple Idol Deity Kali Goddess.

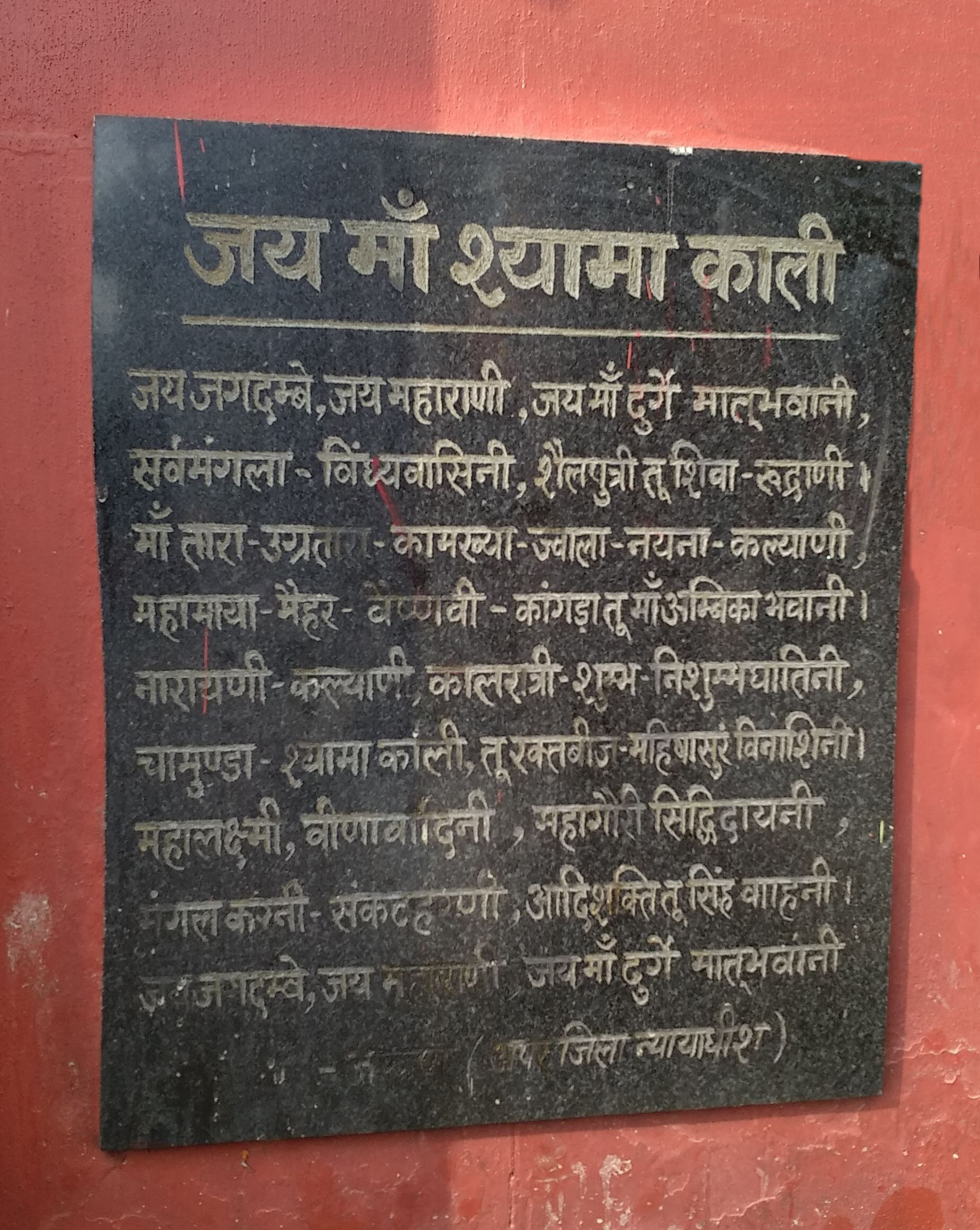
Cornerstone OR Foundation Stone Of Shyama Mai Temple, Darbhanga.

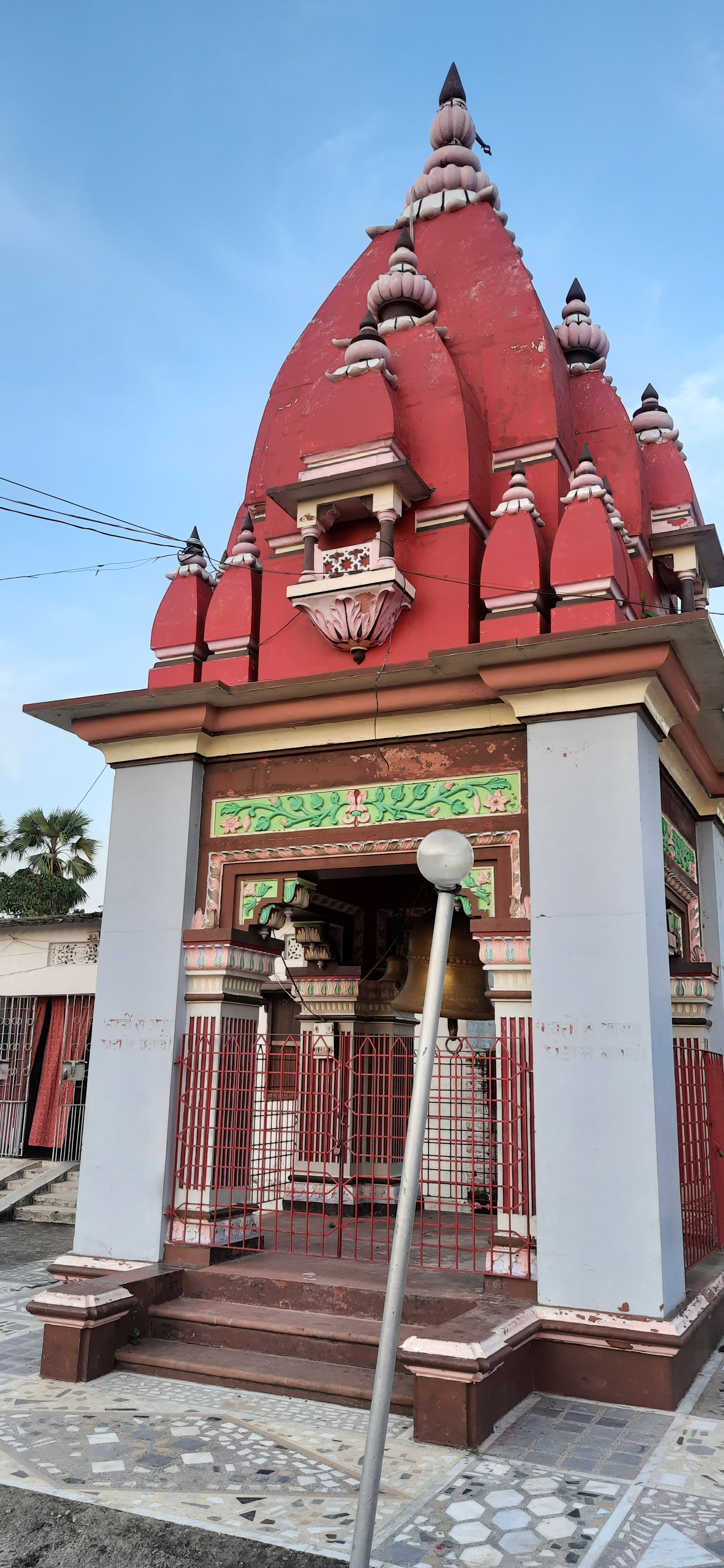
Ghanta Ghar at Shyama Mai Temple.

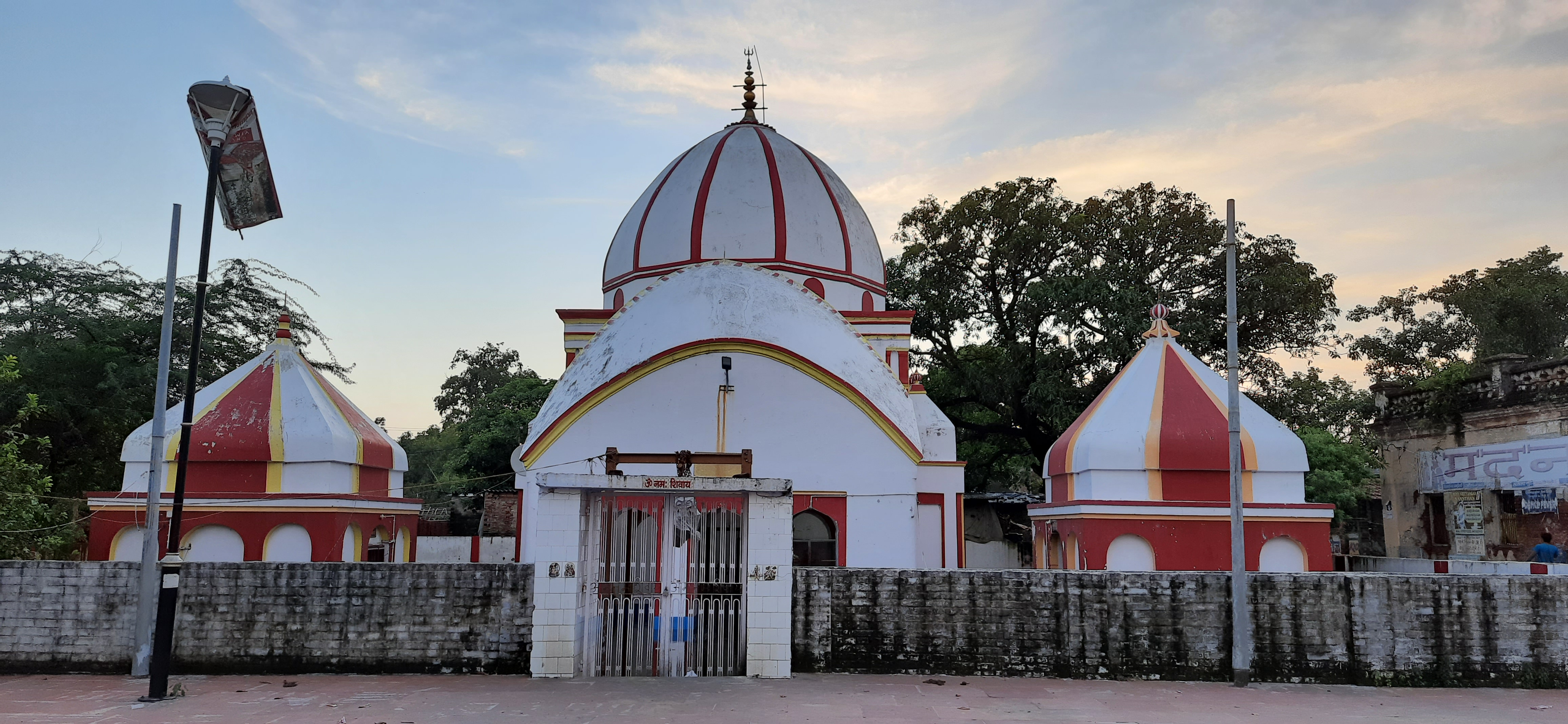
View of Madhaweshwar Temple at Kathalbari.

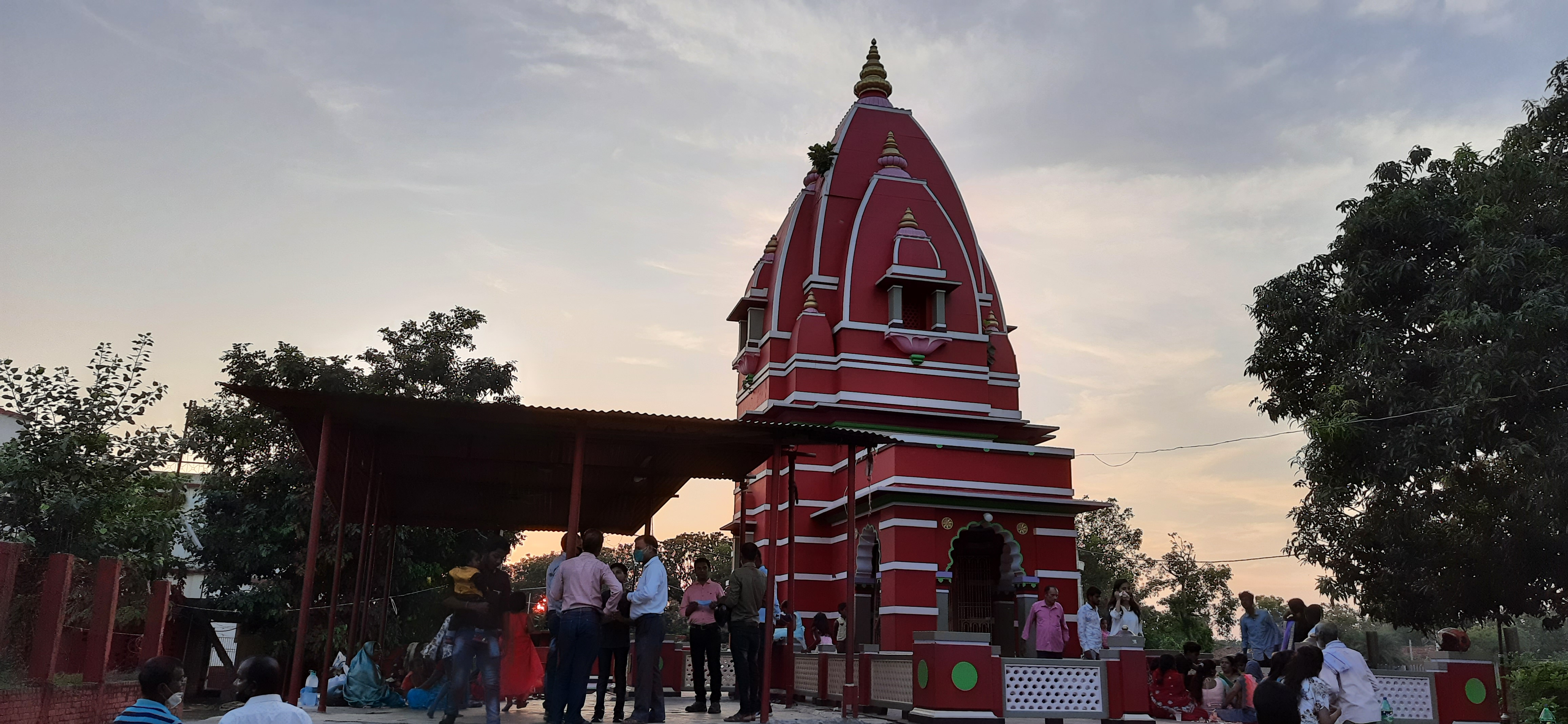
View of Annapurna Temple near Shyama Mai Temple at Darbhanga.

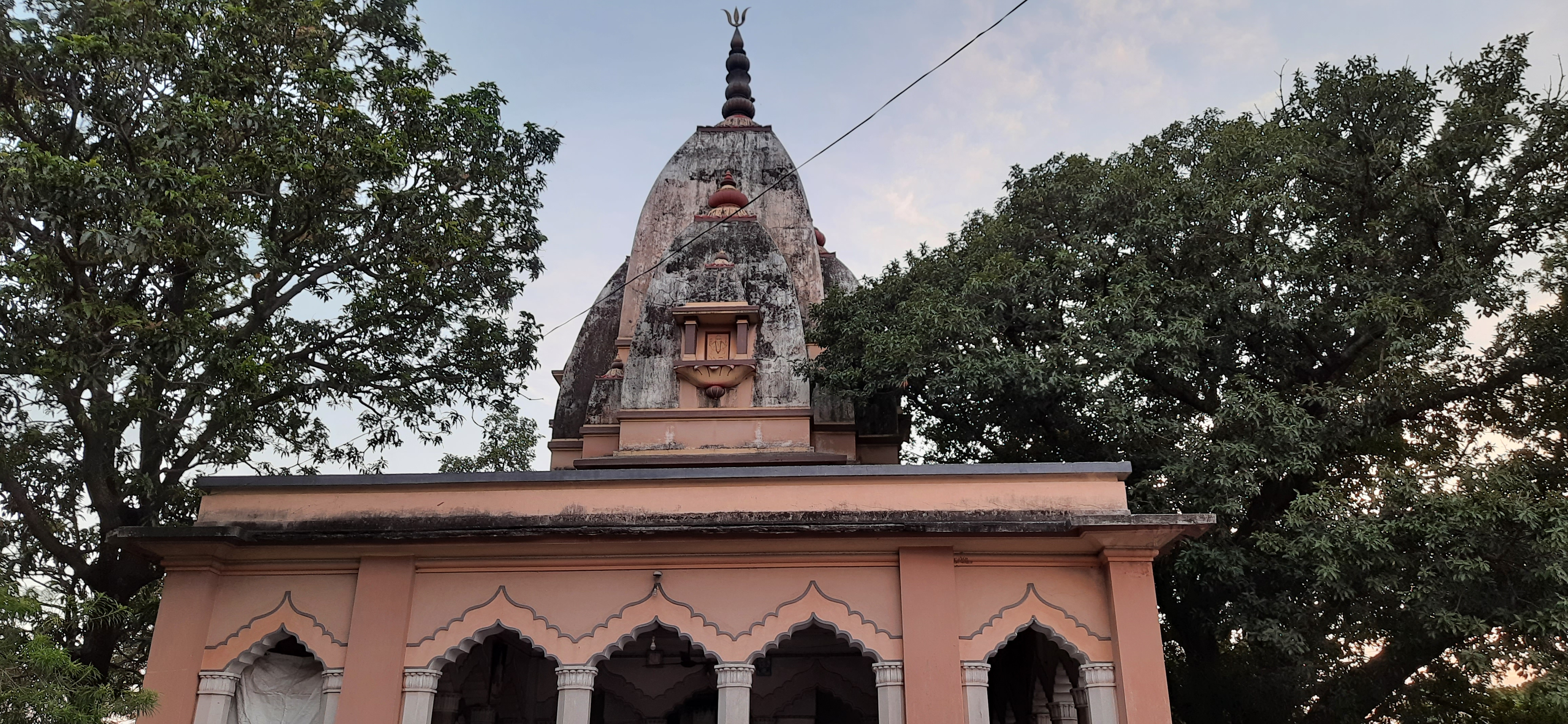
View of Kameshwari Kali Temple near Shyama Mai Temple at Darbhanga.

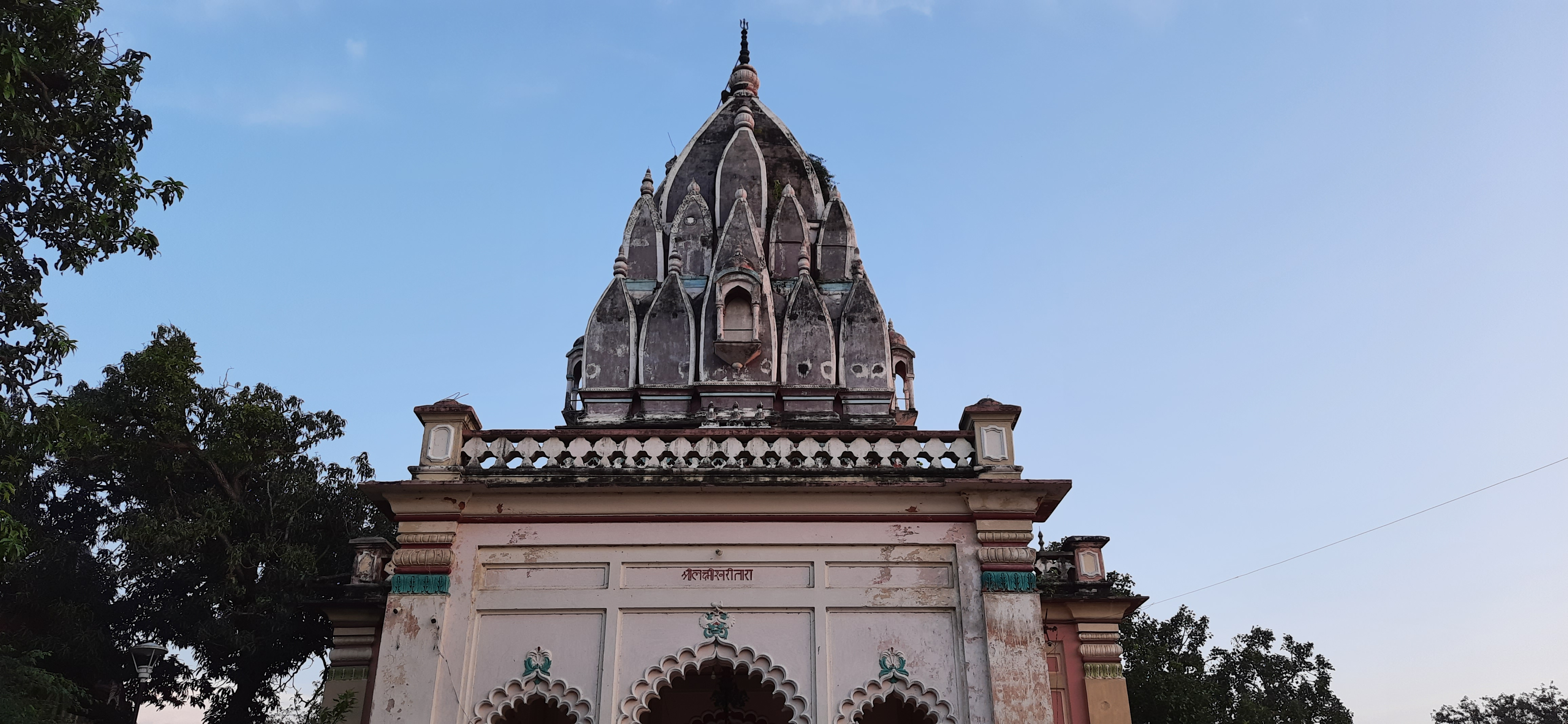
View of Laxmishwari Tara Temple near Shyama Mai Temple at Darbhanga.

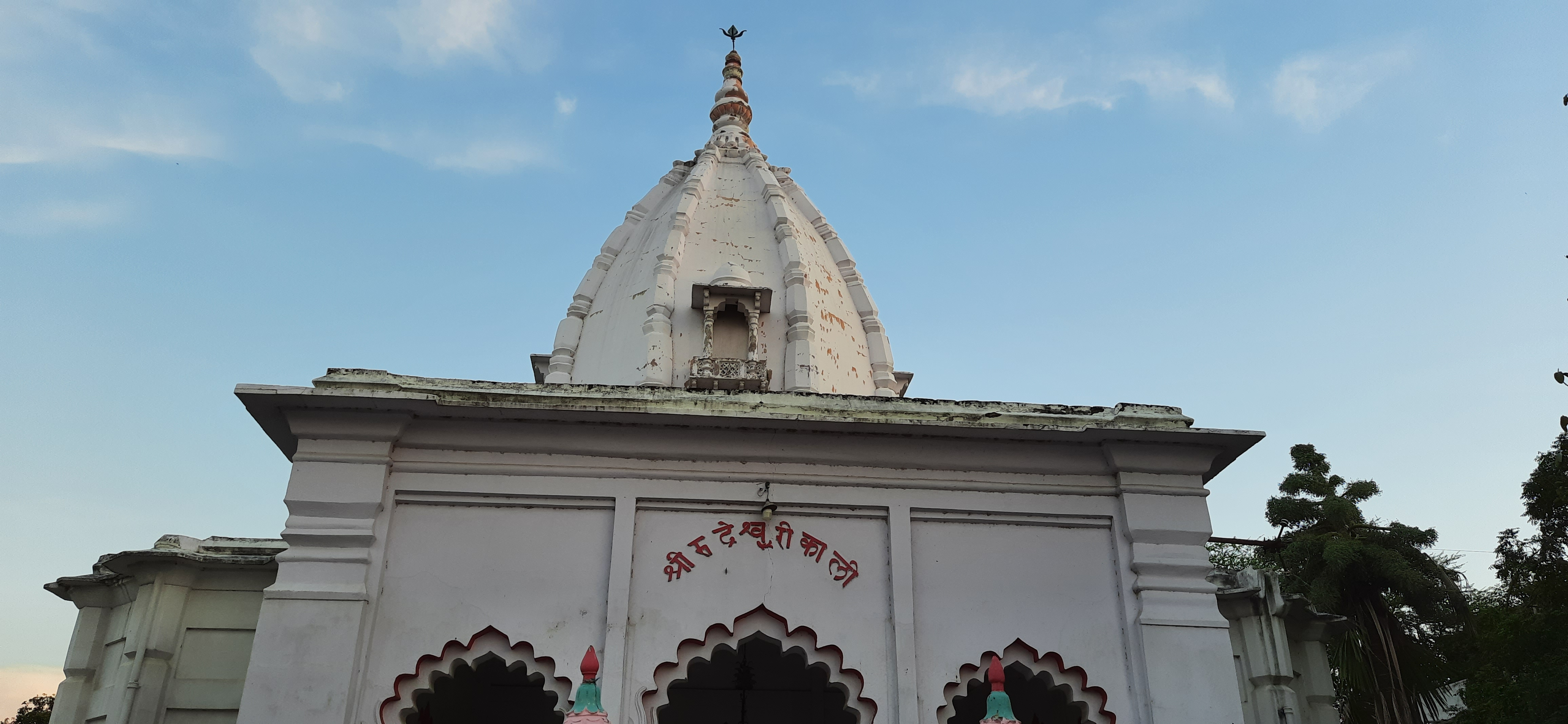
View of Rudreshwari Kali Temple near Shyama Mai Temple at Darbhanga.

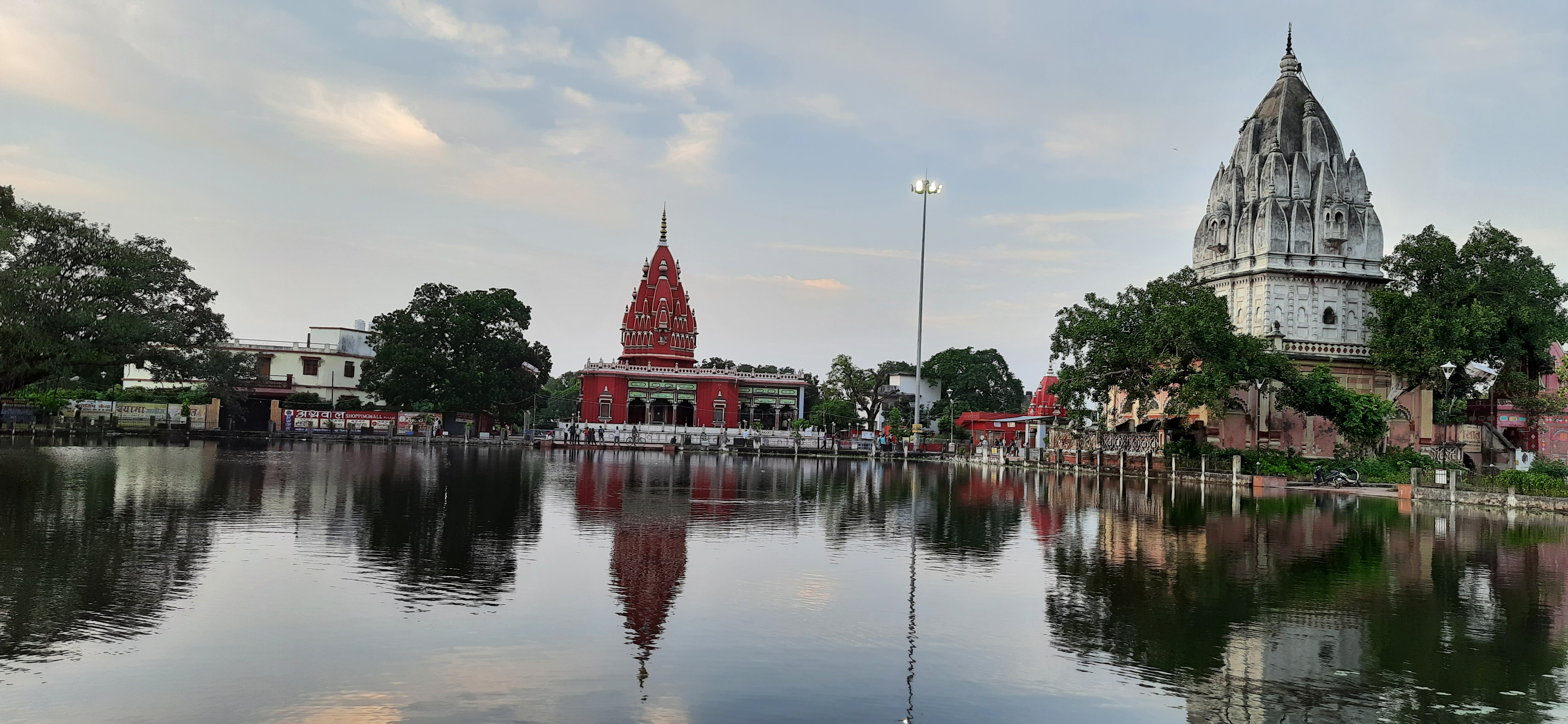
View of Shyama Mai Temple Pond at Darbhanga
