= Sirhulli =

Sirhulli Sirhauli
- village
- Location in Bihar, India Sirhulli (India)
- Coordinates: 26.2629299°N 85.8487464°E
- Country: India
- State: Bihar
- District: Darbhanga

Government
  - Body: Bihar state gov.

Population
  - Total: 7,000−12,000

Languages
  - Official: Maithili, Hindi, Urdu
- Time zone: UTC+5:30 (IST)
- Coastline: 0 kilometres (0 mi)
- Nearest city: Darbhanga
- Lok Sabha constituency: Darbhanga
- Civic agency: esbp

Sirhulli or Sirhauli is a village in the state of Bihar, India. It is in the district of and 17 km away from Darbhanga. 800 families live there.

== Description ==
Sihulli is one of 100 villages in the Singhwara Block of Darbhanga.

The village has two ration shops as part of India's Public Distribution System, a primary school, and a branch of a bank at Tektar. One source says that 7,000 people in ~800 families live there. Their houses are built on a flood plain and about half of them have toilets. The nearest high school is 2.5 km away at Pindaruch. The village is short of drinking water, health services and local industry. Many of the inhabitants are weavers but this industry is in decline.

The village came to notice in 2020 when Jyoti Kumari cycled 750 miles home to Sirhulli on a small bike carrying her injured father during the COVID-19 lockdowns in India. Her return was reported internationally and several politicians visited her home to give presents.

The village has access to secondary school, however the entrance exams require a private tutor to prepare for the test and this is a significant expense for some families.

== Notable residents ==
- Jyoti Kumari (c.2005 - ) heroic cyclist
