= Sanjay Saraogi =

Indian politician

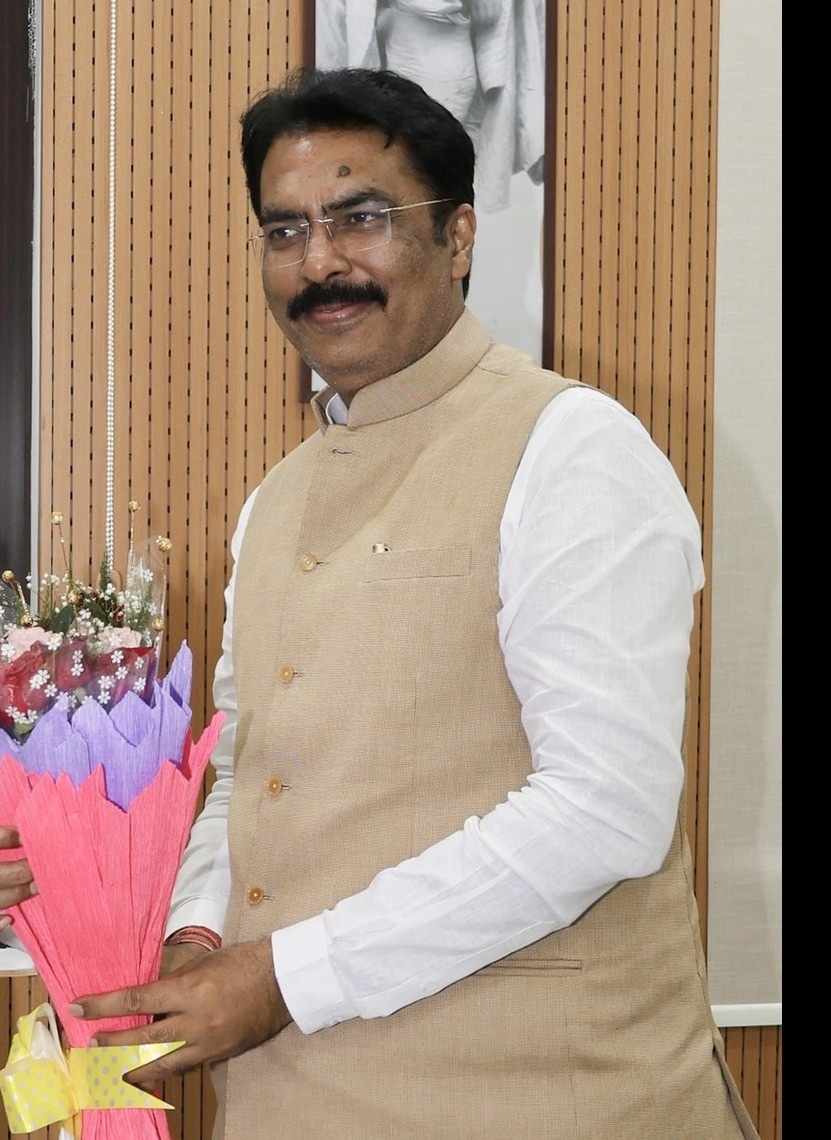

President, Bharatiya Janata Party – Bihar
- Incumbent
- Assumed office 16 December 2025
- President: JP Nadda; Nitin Nabin
- Preceded by: Dilip Kumar Jaiswal

Member of Bihar Legislative Assembly
- Incumbent
- Assumed office February 2005
- Preceded by: Sultan Ahmed
- Constituency: Darbhanga

Minister of Revenue & Land Reforms Government of Bihar
- In office 26 February 2025 – 20 November 2025
- Preceded by: Dilip Kumar Jaiswal
- Succeeded by: Vijay Kumar Sinha

Personal details
- Born: 28 August 1969 (age 56)
- Party: Bharatiya Janata Party
- Profession: Politician

Sanjay Saraogi (born in 1969) is a leader of Bharatiya Janata Party and a member of the Bihar Legislative Assembly. He currently serves as the president of the BJP Bihar since December 2025. He was elected to the Assembly for the first time in February 2005 and again in October 2005, then again in 2010, defeating the nearest RJD candidate by a margin of 26,000 votes from Darbhanga. He again defeated Mahagathbandhan candidate and former mayor Om Prakash Kheria by a margin of 7000 votes in the 2015 Bihar assembly election. In April 2018, he was appointed Chairman of Prakalan Samiti. In the 2020 Bihar Assembly Election, he again defeated RJD candidate Amarnath Gami by the margin of more than 10,000 votes.
