= Software Technology Park of India, Darbhanga =

IT Park in Darbhanga

Software Technology Parks of India, Darbhanga
- Abbreviation: STPI Darbhanga
- Formation: 18 July 2025; 15 months ago
- Type: IT Park
- Headquarters: Darbhanga, Bihar
- Location: ITI Laheriasarai campus, Ramnagar, Darbhanga, Bihar
- Region served: Bihar
- Parent organisation: Ministry of Electronics and Information Technology
- Affiliations: Software Technology Parks of India
- Website: stpi.in/darbhanga

Software Technology Park of India (STPI) in the city of Darbhanga is the first IT Park in the Mithila region of India. Similarly it is the second STPI centre in the state of Bihar and 68th STPI Centre in India. It was inaugurated by the Prime Minister Narendra Modi on 18 July 2025. It is expected that this IT Park will give a new identity to the city of Darbhanga in the coming days. It is located within the ITI Laheriasarai campus at Ramnagar in Darbhanga and spans 16,000 square feet area.

Software Technology Parks of India is an autonomous society under the Ministry of Electronics and Information Technology (MeitY). The main objective is of the autonomous society is promotion of software exports from the country. The IT Tower of the software technology park in Darbhanga is a two-storey building. According the site engineer Vijay Kumar Singh, this IT park in Darbhanga will prove to be a boon for the IT engineers and professionals of the Mithila region working in IT sector. They can launch start-up programs and companies in this two-storey software technology park. It is expected that this IT park will increase employment opportunities in the region.

== History ==
In 2018, the then finance minister Sushil Kumar Modi of the Government of Bihar, declared the proposal for the Software Technology Park of India at Darbhanga during the inauguration of the two days event Patna Ideathon 2018. The two days event was organised to promote young IT sector entrepreneurs in the state of Bihar. In 2020, he decided to build a Software Technology Park of India in the city of Darbhanga spread over 10 acres of land. In 2024, two companies were allotted for offices in the IT Tower. These two companies were Mithila Stack and AbhiCares. Apart from these two companies, applications from more than a dozen foreign companies were submitted which were under consideration.

The construction of the Software Technology Park of India in Darbhanga was completed in 2025. It was built with an investment of ₹10 crore. After its completion, the IT Park was virtually inaugurated by the Prime Minister Narendra Modi from a program held in Motihari city of Bihar.
