= School Games Federation of India =

Sports governing body

School Games Federation Of India
- Abbreviation: SGFI
- Type: Sports Organisation
- Headquarters: Lucknow, Uttar Pradesh
- President: Deepak Kumar
- Secretary General: Amarjeet Sharma
- Affiliations: International School Sport Federation, Ministry of Youth Affairs and Sports
- Website: sgfi.org.in

School Games Federation of India (SGFI) is the sports governing body to encourage, promote and popularize all recognized Olympic Games, Asian Games, Common Wealth games and regional level popular sports amongst the school boys and girls of India.

SGFI was established in 1954. It is recognized by the Ministry of Youth Affairs and Sports and is an active member of the International School Sport Federation and Asian School Sports Federation.
