= List of villages in Darbhanga district =

List of villages of Darbhanga refers to villages in Darbhanga district in Bihar.

The following villages are located in Darbhanga district in respective blocks:

== Alinagar ==
- Adhloam
- Alinagar
- Andauli
- Antour
- Askaul
- Baghela
- Chak Khoka
- Chak Milki
- Chamropatti
- Dhamsayn
- Dhamwara
- Gadaul
- Gorkha
- Hanuman Nagar
- Haritha
- Harsinghpur
- Jaitipur
- Kataha
- Kiratpur
- Korthu
- Kurson
- Lahata
- Lilpur
- Milki
- Mirzapur
- Mohiuddipur
- Motipur
- Nankar
- Narma
- Nuruddinpur Dost
- Pirauli
- Rampur Udai
- Rashidpur
- Rupaspur
- Shampur
- Sisouni
- Sohat
- Tumaul
- Urgawan
- Jaughtta

== Bahadurpur ==
- Abdullahpur
- Ahiapatti
- Ahila
- Ahmad Sujawal
- Amapatti
- Andama
- Asgaon
- Az Rakbe Basdeopur
- Badh Basti
- Balaha
- Balbhadarpur
- Bali Bagraul
- Balia
- Ballupur
- Baluahi
- Bankipur
- Baraur
- Barheta
- Baruara
- Basatpur
- Basdeopur
- Bastauli
- Bazidpur
- Bedipatti
- Bela Yakub
- Bhairopatti
- Bhatani
- Birnia
- Bishambharpur
- Bishunpur Manora
- Biuni
- Chak Aga
- Chak Gonauli
- Chak Mahnauli
- Chak Maksudpur
- Chakka
- Chataria
- Dih Chhaprar
- Chintamanpur
- Dagarsam
- Dalaur
- Darhar
- Dasrathpatti
- Dekuli
- Deokali
- Dharnipatti
- Dilawarpur
- Ekmi
- Fatehpur
- Gangapatti
- Gangia
- Ganipur
- Gehumi
- Gharghata
- Ghorghata
- Govindpur
- Gopipatti
- Gorhia
- Gundauli
- Harpatti
- Hasanpur
- Hem Naraenpur
- Jagdispur
- Jalwara
- Jiwanpatti
- Jogiara
- Kamrauli
- Kansi
- Kapchhahi
- Khaira Kunji
- Kheraj Shahpur
- Kherajpur
- Kishunpur
- Kokat
- Kusothar
- Lachhmipur
- Madhuban
- Mahpara
- Mahua
- Maniari
- Mathia urf Madhopur
- Mekna Baida
- Mirzapur
- Musapur
- Nehalpur
- Ojhaul
- Padri
- Pansiha
- Parauna
- Phakila
- Pingi
- Pirari
- Pokhar Bhinda
- Premjiwar
- Purkhopatti
- Raghaipura
- Raja Rauli
- Rambhadarpur
- Ramnagar
- Rampur Dakhli
- Rampur Madan
- Rampur Ramdeo a.k.a. Chandih
- Rampur Rauli
- Rasulpur Kalan
- Rasulpur Khurd
- Rosan Chak
- Salaha
- Semra
- Senduar Gopal
- Shahpur
- Shankarpur
- Siram Pipra
- Sirdilpur
- Sobhan
- Tara Lahi
- Tarauni
- Teunga
- Ughara
- Yakubpur

== Baheri ==
- Adharpur
- Amta
- Athar
- Baghauni
- Baghra
- Baheri
- Bakmandar
- Baligaon
- Bandh Jhanjhar
- Bandhuli
- Behrauna
- Benta
- Bhachhi Asli
- Bhagawatipur
- Bharwari
- Bhawani Nimaithi
- Bithauli
- Chak Raipur
- Chaka
- Chakla
- Chakwa
- Chilha Asli
- Dadarwara
- Dhanauli
- Dhobepur Bansara
- Dilawarpur
- Dohat Narain
- Dubauli
- Dumri
- Gangdah
- Gujraul
- Hathauri
- Inay
- Jadupatti
- Jurja
- Kalyanpur
- Kapi
- Kargawan
- Kerwakoith
- Khagrahata
- Khagri
- Kharari
- Kumar
- Kushiam
- Lagupur
- Madhuban
- Mattharahi
- Maheshpur
- Mahua
- Man
- Paghari
- Partapatti
- Ramauli
- Rajwara
- Rampur
- Sadhua
- Salha
- Samadhpura
- Samastipur
- Sankhara
- Semram
- Semri
- Serwamanor
- Sher
- Sonwan
- Sosari
- Thathupur
- Turki

== Benipur ==
- Achalpur
- Amaithi
- Az Rakbe Mahinam
- Baigani
- Balni
- Barhampatti
- Batho
- Bikupatti
- Bishunathpur
- Deoram
- Dherukh
- Ganesh Banau
- Hari Bhauor
- Harpur
- Itaharwa
- Jakauli
- Jarshon
- Katwara
- Khamhan
- Kishunpur
- Labani
- Lachhmanpur
- Madhopur
- Mahinam
- Moazampur
- Mokarampur
- Nawada
- Panchupatti
- Parkhotimpur
- Pohadi
- Ramouli
- Rarhiam
- Rasulpur
- Sajhwar
- Shivram
- Sherampur
- Sirampur
- Supaul
- Tarauni
- Upardaha
- Ghongheya

== Biraul ==
- Afzala
- Akbarpur Baik
- Andhiari
- Arjuna Bijulia
- Athar
- Auranga Usuri
- Awan
- Az Rakbe Gobindpur
- Balia
- Belgaun
- Bhaini
- Bhanta
- Birampur
- Biraul
- Bhawanipur
- Changwara
- Deokali
- Dumri
- Fakirana
- Gambhiria
- Gaura
- Gayri
- Hanshi
- Hanti
- Harpatti Gobindpur
- Harpur Kalan
- Jagarnathpur
- Jagdispur
- Jaikishunpur
- Kahuwa
- Kamlabari
- Kamar Kalan
- Kataya
- Ladha
- Lalpur
- Mahamadpur Boaanri
- Mahua
- Manorbhoram
- Mirzapur
- Murwara
- Naraenpur
- Nausta
- Neuri
- Padri
- Paghari
- Pakhram
- Parhat
- Patania
- Ramnagar
- Rampur
- Rasulpur
- Rohar
- Saduka
- Sahasram
- Saho
- Shiunagar
- Shiwpur
- Sihol
- Sirsia
- Sogaha
- Sonbihat
- Sonpur
- Supaul
- Talibpur
- Uchhati

== Darbhanga ==
- Asraha
- Adalpur
- Amdiha
- Ami
- Andhri
- Arazi Barmotar
- Atihar
- Az Rakbe Ami
- Az Rakbe Purkhotimpur
- Badea
- Badh Marauna
- Balaha
- Balia
- Banauli
- Bansdih
- Basaila
- Basdeopur
- Bedaul
- Behat
- Bela
- Bela Dullah
- Bela Dullah
- Bela Nawada
- Bela Shankar
- Belhar
- Belwa
- Bhagwanpur
- Bhalpatti
- Bhaluahi
- Bhawanipur
- Bhidhi
- Bhindi
- Bhuskaul
- Bijuli
- Birdipur
- Bishunpur
- Bishunpur Medni
- Borwa
- Brahmotar Az Rakbe Dularpur
- Bramotar Az Rakbe Chhatwan
- Chak Abdul Rahim
- Chak Bhulka
- Chak Gadhia
- Chak Jamal
- Chak Karima
- Chak Mohiuddin
- Chak Sona
- Chak Wali
- Chakka
- Chamru Bishunpur
- Chandpatti
- Chataria
- Chhabila
- Chhoataipatti
- Chikni
- Darbhanga (M Corp.)
- Dharampur (Singhwara 847306)
- Dhoi
- Dih Berai
- Diwari
- Dularpur
- Dumduma
- Dumri
- Fazla
- Gabir Chak
- Gairpur
- Gangwara
- Gausa
- Gausa Dih
- Gehumi
- Gehumi
- Gehumi
- Ghorghata
- Jafra
- Kanaur
- Kabaria
- Kabir Chak
- Kansi (Part in Darbhanga)
- Kansi Dakhli
- Kanti
- Karhatia
- Ketuka
- Khajuri
- Kharthua
- Kharua
- Kheraj Bela
- Khodadadpur
- Khojkipur
- Khutwara
- Kusumpatti Kanaur
- Lau Tola
- Leama
- Mabbi Belauna
- Madhopur
- Madhpur
- Mahjidia
- Mankauli
- Mahua
- Majhiam
- Majlis Pokhar
- Makhnahi
- Malpatti
- Mamal
- Mani
- Manihas
- Kansi Manihas
- Masumpur Kataria
- Mathurapur
- Mausimpur
- Milki
- Muria
- Mustafapur
- Naina Ghat
- Narkatia
- Narkatia*pakri
- Noorchak
- Pachgachhia
- Padri (CT)
- Panta
- Pathar Patti
- Pura
- pouram
- Purkhotimpur
- Ram Berai
- Rampur Madan
- Rampur
- Rampur Kasim 1
- Rampur Kasim 2
- Ramsala
- Ranipur
- Ranna
- Rasula
- Rasulpur Sahila
- Ruchaul
- Sara Fazil
- Sara Mahamad
- Shahzadpur
- Shahbazpur Bhulka
- Shahzadpur
- Siso
- Sobhan
- Sonki
- Sundarpur
- Tektar
- Tethan
- Thakurania
- Hanumangar Panu Tolla

== Gaura Bauram ==
- Aadharpur
- Adhlar
- Adhlar
- Ahisa
- Akhtwara
- Asi
- Baijnathpur
- Balthari
- Bangrahata
- Bangrasi
- Bargawan
- Basuli
- Bath
- Bauram
- Belwara
- Bhuskan
- Bishunpur
- Ganauni
- Gauramansingh
- Hasanpur
- Hasopur
- Kahuwa
- Kanhai
- Kasraund
- Kothram
- Kumai (village)
- Kunauni
- Lagwa Bais
- Magura
- Mahuwar
- Malhi
- Mansara
- Misrauli
- Nadai
- Nankar
- Nari Bhadawn
- Nasahara
- Palawa
- Parasrama
- Pharshahi
- Punach
- Rauta
- Tenduwa
- Tira
- Uphraul

== Ghanshyampur ==
- Asma
- Bhagwanpur Bhit
- Borwa
- Burheb
- Barhampura
- Chharapatti
- Dathua
- Dohatha
- Dompathi
- Faizullahpur
- Ghanshyampur
- Godhaul
- Galma
- Hardowarpur
- Jaideopatty
- Korthu
- Kumraul
- Mahathwar
- Padari
- Pali
- Phakirana
- Pohadi
- Punahad
- Salahpur Lagma
- Semadeori
- Shahpur
- Supaul
- Tumaul

== Hanumannagar ==
- Ama Dih
- Araila
- Baghela
- Bahupatti
- Banswara
- Barhmotara
- Basant
- Bharaul
- Bhawanipur
- Bihari Makund
- Bisaul
- Bishunpur
- Chandauli
- Chhatauna
- Dabhrauli
- Dath
- Dih lahi
- Godaipatti
- Gopalpur
- Gorhaila
- Gorhiari
- Gorwara
- Gorwara Barhmotar
- Hasanpur
- Hichhaul
- Husenabad
- Jamalpur urf Santpur
- Kali
- Khusro Sarae
- Kolhatta
- Lauara
- Madhopur
- Mahamadpur
- Mahamadpur Sinduar
- Mahnauli
- Manhara
- Moro
- Mustafapur
- Narsara
- Neam
- Panchobh
- Pandaul
- Patori
- Phulwaria
- Poaria
- Rajwara
- Rampatti
- Rampur
- Rampur Dih
- Ratanpura
- Rupauli
- Saidpur
- Thalwara
- Tisi Dih
- Uchauli
- Udhopatti
- Ughra
- Urra

== Hayaghat ==
- Akbarpur
- Aliabad
- Anandpur
- Allahbad Anar
- Anpatti Bishunpur
- Balia
- Bans Dih
- Berai Patti
- Bishunpur
- Chandanpatti
- Chikni
- Debipur
- Dhiropatti
- Ghosrama
- Hajipur
- Hajipur Biranpatti
- Hassanpur
- Horalpatti
- Masood Patti
- Mahamadpur
- Mahamadpur Sirnia
- Majhaulia Bisaipatti
- MOHDpur
- Maksudpur
- Maahipatti Bahadurpur
- Mannupur Kharra
- Manorathpur
- Manorathpur Tulsi
- Mirzapur
- Parmanandpur
- Parmar
- Pator
- Paurao
- Pipraulia
- Rasulpur
- Ratanpura
- Salimpur Sidhauli
- Sirajpur
- Sirnia
- Siwaisinghpur
- Sobhai Patti
- Sobhnath Patti
- Usma

== Jale ==
- Ahiari
- Badri
- Bihari
- Baghaul
- Bandhauli
- Barhampur
- Chak Milki
- Chak Talaila
- Chandar Dipa
- Chandauna
- Darhia
- Deora
- Dighopatti
- Dighra
- Gadari
- Gaisri
- Ghograha
- Harauli
- Jale
- Jogiara
- Kachhua
- Kaji Bahera
- Kalwara
- Kamtaul
- Kangni
- Kardahuli
- Karhans Ratanpur
- Karwa
- Katai
- Kataia
- Katraul
- Katraul Basant
- Khajurwara
- Kheraj
- Lalpur
- Mahuli Nankar
- Majhaura
- Malikpur
- Manam Deb
- Manamkhedu
- Massa
- Milk Pauni
- Muraitha
- Nagar Diha
- Nawada
- Nimrauli
- Pakhauli
- Pauni
- Rajaun
- Rajaun Asli
- Rarhi
- Ratanpur Abhiman
- Reorha
- Rumaul
- Sadrabad
- Sahaspur
- Sisauni Rajaun
- Tariyani

== Keoti Ranway ==
- Andama
- Asrafpur
- Asraha
- Babu Salimpur
- Badh Samaila
- Bansara
- Banwari Patti
- Barahi
- Barahi Abuara
- Bariaul
- Bazidpur
- Behta
- Bhagwatpur
- Bharathpur
- Bheriahi
- Bhojpatti
- Bihatwara
- Binwara
- Birkha
- Birkhauli
- Birna
- Bishunpur
- Chak Ajam
- Chak Bhawani
- Chakka
- Chamarjana urf Dudhia
- Chatra
- Chhachha
- Chhatwan
- Dalwa
- Darma
- Dhobgawan
- Dhuria
- Dhuria Daharia
- Dighiar
- Dome
- Gobindpur
- Gokhul
- Hajipur
- Hanuman Nagar
- Harpur
- Jalwara
- Jethiahi
- Jiwra
- Kaem Chak
- Kaharia
- Kamaldah
- Karjapatti
- Kasma Balbhadar
- Keoti Ranway
- Kheraj Dhuria
- Kheraj Mardan Singh
- Khirma
- Kishunpur
- Koilathan
- Kopgarh
- Kothia
- Kothli Majhiama
- Ladari
- Lahwar
- Lalganj
- Madhopatti Raghauli
- Mahamadpur
- Maheshajan
- Mangarthu
- Megha
- Milki
- Mohan Math
- Mohanpur
- Naya Gaon
- Nonaura
- Pacharhi
- Pachma
- Paighambarpur
- Para
- Pathra
- Pilakhwar
- Pindaruch
- Radha
- Raiam
- Rajaura
- Ranway
- Rasulpur
- Ratauli
- Sahpur Dih
- Samaila
- Sarhwara
- Sarjapur
- Shekhpatti
- Shekhpura urf Dagarwara
- Tektar
- Postapur
- Dudhya Hanumannagar

== Kiratpur ==
- Amahi
- Bhobhaul
- Bholi
- Birdipur
- Danha
- Dhangha
- Jagson
- Jamalpur
- Jhagarua
- Kandwara
- Khaisa
- Kubaul
- Narkatia
- Rasiyari
- Tarwara
- Tatari

== Kusheshwar Asthan Purbi ==
- Adalpur
- Anrahi
- Barania
- Beltharwa
- Bhaluka
- Bhirua
- Bishunia
- Burhia Sukhrasi
- Dharampur
- Godaipura
- Goram Dih
- Gulma
- Harnahi
- Itahar
- Kaunia
- Kewatgawan
- Khalasin
- Kola
- Kolatoka
- Mahadeo Math
- Mahisanr urf Narkatia
- Mahisaut
- Pipra
- Piprahi
- Raepur
- Reota
- Samhaura
- Simartoka
- Sisauna
- Sughrain
- Tilakpur
- Tilkeswar
- Ujua
- Urthua
- Usri

== Manigachhi ==
- Amtahi
- Aropur
- Az Rakbe Kotma
- Badhipur
- Baghant
- Bahuarwa
- Barhampur
- Barhampura
- Bazidpur
- Belahi
- Belaur
- Bhandarso
- Bhatpura
- Bihta
- Bisaul
- Chak Basawan
- Chak Chintamanpur
- Chandaur
- Dahura
- Dubhaul
- Gangauli
- Jagdishpur
- Jatuka
- Kaesth Kawai
- Kanakpur
- Kanhauli
- Kotma
- Lehara
- Madhepur
- Maunbehat
- Mir Chak
- Narotimpur
- Paik Tola
- Paithan Kawai
- Pandaul
- Phulban
- Raghopur
- Raje
- Sakhwar
- Tariati
- Tatuar
- Ujan
- Makaranda
- Nazra Babu Tola
- Kashimpur
- Aber urf Rambari
- Asman
- Aso
- Atraha
- Aurahi
- Bahrampur urf Masankhon
- Bairo
- Balaha
- Bargaon
- Barhampur
- Barna
- Barsanda
- Basaul
- Ber
- Bhadahar
- Bhatwan
- Bisharia
- Chingri
- Darbepur
- Dharshyam
- Dinmo
- Dubaha
- Fakirana Kalyan Dih
- Geaspur
- Ghordaur
- Ghorsar
- Gora
- Gothani
- Harauli
- Harinagar
- Hathauri
- Hathra
- Hirni
- Jafarpur
- Jhajhra
- Kachhua
- Kalna Dih
- Khesraha
- Khotas Kalana
- Ladiami
- Laranch Bhadaul
- Larni
- Lodipur
- Maharajpur
- Mahri
- Mahri Dih
- Maibi
- Majhiam
- Manaitha
- Manoripur
- Missi
- Mohim Buzurg
- Mohim Khurd
- Naraenpur
- Pach Hara Buzrug
- Pachhara Khurd
- Paika Charai
- Pakahi
- Pando
- Pirori
- Sanauli
- Sanauli
- Sanichara
- Semraha
- Shahpur
- Siripur urf Sukmarpur
- Sultanpur
- Tasmanpatti
- Tole Khaki Daspur
- Uda

== Singhwara ==
- Arai
- Asthua
- Atarbel
- Atarbel Ramchaura
- Baheri
- Bahuara Buzurg
- Balaha
- Banauli
- Barhaulia
- Basauli
- Bastwara
- Bataul
- Bedauli
- Bhagwatipur
- Bhajaura Nankar
- Bharathi
- Bharauli
- Bharwara
- Bhawanipur
- Birdipur
- Bisambharpur
- Bisaul
- Bishunathpatti
- Bithauli
- Brahampur
- Chak Dargah
- Chak Kazi
- Chaphan
- Dahsil
- Fatehpur
- Gaura
- Gobindpur
- Gogaul urf Gangauli
- Hajipur
- Hanuman Nagar
- Harakh
- Hariharpur
- Harpur
- Hasan Chak
- Hayatpur
- Inamat
- Kalwara
- Kanigaon
- Kathalia
- Katka
- Kauar
- Kawai
- Kewatsa
- Kheraj Phulthua
- Kora
- Korauni
- Kuarpatti
- Kusumpatti
- Kusumpatti Kanaur
- Lorika
- Madhopur
- Madhupur
- Maheshpatti
- Maheshpatti
- Makanpur
- Manihas
- Manikauli
- Mirzapur Jagni
- Mirzapur Jitwara
- Misrauli
- Mohanpur
- Nista
- Paigambarpur
- Paira
- Phulthua
- Pipra
- Rajo
- Rampatti
- Rampura
- Rasulpur
- Sabaul
- Sanahpur Buzurg
- Sanahpur Dih
- Saraia
- Sarwara
- Shakarpur
- Simri
- Singhwara
- Sirhauli
- Tekatar

== Tardih ==
- Awam
- Baika
- Barhmotar
- Batha
- Bathay
- Bishunpur
- Bisuhat
- Chaka
- Dadpatti
- Deona
- Dhanirampur
- Dhankaul
- Ejrahta
- Kaithwar
- Kathara
- Khidarpura
- Kakodha
- Kurson
- Lagma Rambhadar
- Lodiami
- Machhaita
- Madaria
- Mahia
- Mahthor
- Nadhiami
- Naraenpur
- Pachahi Machhaita
- Patai
- Phakirna
- Phulwaria
- Pokhar Bhinda
- Raja Kharwar
- Sakatraipur
- Sherpur
- Sirampur
- Sotharia
- Tangha
- Tardi
