= Galma =

Galma may refer to:

- Gəlmə, a municipality in Azerbaijan
- Galma, Darbhanga, a village in India
- Galma Koudawatche, a village in Niger
- Gâlma River (disambiguation), two rivers in Romania
- Galma station, station of the Daejeon Metro Line 1 in Galma-dong, Seo District, Daejeon, South Korea
