= Jale Assembly constituency =

Coordinates: 26°22′07″N 85°43′22″E

- Constituency No. - for the Bihar Legislative Assembly

Constituency details
- Country: India
- Region: East India
- State: Bihar
- District: Darbhanga
- Established: 1951
- Total electors: 314,779
- Reservation: None

Member of Legislative Assembly
- 18th Bihar Legislative Assembly
- Incumbent Jibesh Kumar Mishra
- Party: BJP
- Alliance: NDA
- Elected year: 2025
- Preceded by: Rishi Mishra

Jale is an assembly constituency in Darbhanga district in the Indian state of Bihar.

== Overview ==
As per Delimitation of Parliamentary and Assembly constituencies Order, 2008, No. 87 Jale Assembly constituency is composed of the following: Jale community development block; Asthua, Bhawanipur, Rajo, Katasa, Katka, Manikauli, Nista, Rampura, Sanahpur, Shakarpur, Singhwara North, Singhwara South, Jale South, Jale West, Jaale North, Jale East, katrual Basant, Rahi East, Radhi West, Rahi North, Radhi South, Doghra, Tariyani, Reodha and Bharwara, Muraith gram panchayats of Singhwara CD Block.

Jale Assembly constituency is part of No. 6 Madhubani (Lok Sabha constituency).

== Members of the Legislative Assembly ==
Year	Name	Party
1952	Abdul Sami Nadavi	Indian National Congress
1957	Sheikh Tahir Hussain	Indian National Congress
1962	Narayan Choudhary	Indian National Congress
1967	Khadim Hussain	Communist Party of India
1969	Tejnarayan Rout	Bharatiya Jana Sangh
1972	Khadim Hussain	Communist Party of India
1977	Kapildeo Thakur	Janata Party
1980	Abdul Salam	Communist Party of India
1985	Lokesh Nath Jha	Indian National Congress
1990	Vijay Kumar Mishra	Indian National Congress
1995	Abdul Salam	Communist Party of India
2000	Vijay Kumar Mishra	Bharatiya Janata Party
2005	Ram Niwas Prasad	Rashtriya Janata Dal
2005	Ram Niwas Prasad	Rashtriya Janata Dal
2010	Vijay Kumar Mishra	Bharatiya Janata Party
2014^	Rishi Mishra	Janata Dal (United)
2015	Jibesh Kumar Mishra	Bharatiya Janata Party
2020	Jibesh Kumar Mishra	Bharatiya Janata Party
2025	Jibesh Kumar Mishra	Bharatiya Janata Party

== Election results ==
=== 2025 ===
2025 Bihar Legislative Assembly election: Jale
Party	Candidate	Votes	%	±%
BJP	Jibesh Kumar Mishra	100,496	50.16	−1.5
INC	Rishi Mishra	78,634	39.25	+0.47
JSP	Ranjit Sharma	5,150	2.57	
AIMIM	Faishal Rahman	4,666	2.33	
Independent	Maskoor Ahmad Usmani	4,605	2.3	
Independent	Mohammad Piyare	1,865	0.93	
NOTA	None of the above	2,808	1.4	−0.71
Majority		21,862	10.91	−1.97
Turnout		200,365	63.65	+9.51
BJP hold		Swing		

=== 2020 ===
2020 Bihar Legislative Assembly election: Jale
Party	Candidate	Votes	%	±%
BJP	Jibesh Kumar Mishra	87,376	51.66	+9.97
INC	Maskoor Usmani	65,580	38.78	
Independent	Rangnath Thakur	3,086	1.82	
JAP(L)	Aman Kumar Jha	1,949	1.15	
Independent	Mahesh Kumar Jha	1,819	1.08	
NCP	Najir Ahmad Ansari	1,801	1.06	
NOTA	None of the above	3,573	2.11	−0.96
Majority		21,796	12.88	+9.78
Turnout		169,121	54.14	+1.96
BJP hold		Swing		

=== 2015 ===
Bihar Assembly election, 2015: Jale
Party	Candidate	Votes	%	±%
BJP	Jibesh Kumar Mishra	62,059	41.69	
JD(U)	Rishi Mishra	57,439	38.59	
SP	Mujeeb Rehman	6,759	4.54	
CPI	Sudhir Kumar	4,769	3.2	
Independent	Sajila Khatun	2,967	1.99	
CPI(ML)L	Sushil Mishra	2,110	1.42	
BSP	Aftab Alam	2,108	1.42	
RPI(A)	Navin Kumar Jha	1,424	0.96	
NOTA	None of the above	4,566	3.07	
Majority		4,620	3.1	
Turnout		148,843	52.18	

=== 2010 ===
In the 2010 state assembly elections, Vijay Kumar Mishra of BJP won the Jale assembly seat, defeating his nearest rival Ramniwas Prasad of RJD. Contests in most years were multi cornered but only winners and runners are being mentioned. Ramniwas Prasad of RJD defeated Vijay Kumar Mishra of BJP in October 2005 and February 2005. Vijay Kumar Mishra of BJP in 2000. Abdul Salam of CPI defeated Vijay Kumar Mishra of Congress in 1995. Vijay Kumar Mishra of Congress defeated Abdul Salam of CPI in 1990. Lokesh Nath Jha of Congress defeated Abdul Salam of CPI in 1985. Abdul Salam of CPI defeated Sushil Kumar Jha of Congress in 1980. Kapildeo Thakur of JP defeated Khadim Hussain of CPI in 1977.

== Villages in this constituency ==
- Ahiari
- Atarbel
- Badri
- Bihari
- Baghaul
- Bandhauli
- Barhampur
- Chak Milki
- Chak Talaila
- Chandar Dipa
- Chandauna
- Darhia
- Deora
- Dighopatti
- Doghra
- Gadari
- Gaisri
- Ghograha
- Harauli
- Jale
- Jogiara
- Kachhua
- Kaji Bahera
- Kalwara
- Kamtaul
- Kangni
- Kardahuli
- Karhans Ratanpur
- Karwa
- Katai
- Kataia
- Katraul
- Katraul Basant
- Khajurwara
- Kheraj
- Lalpur
- Mahuli Nankar
- Majhaura
- Malikpur
- Manam Deb
- Manamkhedu
- Massa
- Milk Pauni
- Muraitha
- Nagar Diha
- Nawada
- Nimrauli
- Pakhauli
- Pauni
- Rajaun
- Rajaun Asli
- Rarhi
- Ratanpur Abhiman
- Reorha
- Rumaul
- Sadrabad
- Sahaspur
- Sisauni Rajaun
- Tariyani

== See also ==
- Jalley
