= Sundarpur =

Sundarpur may refer to several places:

In Nepal

- Sundarpur, Mahottari
- Sundarpur, Morang
- Sundarpur, Sarlahi
- Sundarpur, Udayapur

In India

- Sundarpur, Khurda, Orissa
- Sundarpur, Bihar
