= Sundarpur, Jiwachhghat =

Sundarpur
- Village
- Location in Bihar, India Sundarpur (India)
- Coordinates: 26°11′22.7″N 85°59′59.4″E
- Country: India
- State: Bihar
- District: Darbhanga

Languages
  - Official: Maithili, Hindi, Urdu
- Time zone: UTC+5:30 (IST)
- Telephone code: 06272
- ISO 3166 code: IN-BR
- Nearest city: Darbhanga Sakri Madhubani
- Avg. summer temperature: 40 °C (104 °F)
- Avg. winter temperature: 2 °C (36 °F)

Sundarpur is a village at Jiwachhghat Bus Stop in Darbhanga district of Bihar state in India. It is located 10 km from Darbhanga on National Highway 57 (NH 57). It is 108 km from Bihar's capital city Patna. Its pincode is 846004.

== Nearest villages ==
Besides Jiwachhghat, Kharua, Islam Pur, Loam, Muria, Adalpur, Bijuli, Dularpur, Atihar, Balha, Basudeopur, Dhoi, Khutwara, Belhi, Chhatwan, Tarsarai, Andhari, Mukrampoor and many other villages are in Darbhanga Tehsil.

== Geography ==
It is 10 km from Darbhanga on NH 57 in Bihar.

== Schools ==
- Janta high school Jiwachhghat (Darbhanga)
- Rajkiye Prathmik Vidyalay, Sundarpur
- Rajkiye Madhyay Vidyalay, Kharua

== Nearest Railway Station ==
- Tarsarai Railway Station

== Nearest Airport ==
- Darbhanga Airport
