= Galma, Darbhanga =

Galma
- Village
- Location in Bihar, India Galma (India)
- Coordinates: 26.040344°N 86.286010°E
- Country: India
- State: Bihar
- District: Darbhanga

Population (2011)
  - Total: 5,252

Languages
  - Official: Hindi, Maithili
- Time zone: UTC+5:30 (IST)
- PIN: 847427
- ISO 3166 code: IN-BR
- Vehicle registration: BR-07
- Nearest city: Darbhanga
- Lok Sabha constituency: Darbhanga
- Vidhan Sabha constituency: Alinagar
- Website: darbhanga.nic.in

Galma is a small village situated in the Ghanshyampur block of Darbhanga district in the Indian state of Bihar, India. It is part of the Punhad Panchayat and lies within the Darbhanga division. Located approximately 47 km east of Darbhanga, the district headquarters, and about 3 km from Ghanshyampur, Galma is well-connected by road and is around 146 km away from the state capital Patna.

The postal PIN code for Galma is 847427, with its postal head office in Ghanshyampur. Nearby villages include Mahathwar (2 km), Pali (3 km), Alinagar (6 km), Ghanshyampur(5 km), Kasraur (5 km), and Korthu (7 km). It is bordered by Alinagar Block to the north, Kiratpur Block to the west, Gaura Bauram Block to the south, and Tardih Block to the north. Cities like Jhanjharpur, Supaul, Saharsa, and Madhubani are also nearby. The people of Galma go to nearby villages, primarily Pali Bazar, for shopping as the village lacks a market.

== Geography ==
The village is characterized by its rural landscape, with agricultural fields surrounding it. It experiences a subtropical climate with hot summers, a monsoon season, and cool winters. The land is highly fertile, supporting extensive agriculture in the surrounding region.

== Civic administration ==
=== Police station ===
Ghanshyampur Police Station under the Ghanshyampur block is responsible for maintaining law and order, addressing public safety concerns, and handling crime prevention and investigation in the village and nearby villages.

== Demographics ==
Just like the other nearby villages, Maithili is the official and spoken language of Galma. Maithil Brahmins dominate the village population, with several other castes living in the village and nearby villages.

According to the 2011 Census of India, Galma village had a total population of 5,252 of which 2,775 (52.84%) were males and 2447 (42.16%) were females. The population of children with age 0 to 6 years was 783. The total number of literate people in Galma was approximately 3,402 ( which is 64.78% out of the total population).

== Economy ==
The economy of Galma is predominantly agrarian. The residents of the village primarily rely on farming, growing rice, wheat, and vegetables. Additionally, some villagers are involved in small-scale industries and trade.

== Transport ==
Although a rural village, it's connected by roads to Darbhanga city, which provides access to essential services and transport links. The village lacks a railway station within a 10 km radius. The nearest major Railway station is Darbhanga Junction.

== Education ==
The village do have some government primary and higher secondary school but lacks any private schools or educational institutions. The children go to schools available in the nearby villages, such as, Bal Kalyan Public School, in Pali which is a CBSE affiliated 10+2 private school. For higher education, residents have to travel to nearby cities.
