= Lehara =

Lehara लेहरा Nehra; Nehra West; Nehra East
- Village
- Location in Bihar, India Lehara (India) Lehara (Asia) Lehara (Earth)
- Coordinates: 26.148880841920764°N 86.10276956725744°E
- Country: India
- State: Bihar
- Region: Mithila
- District: Darbhanga

Government
  - Type: Gram Panchayat
  - Body: Nehra East, Nehra West

Population (2011)
  - Total: 17,373

Languages
  - Official: Maithili, Hindi, Urdu
- Time zone: UTC+5:30 (IST)
- Pin Code: 847233
- Telephone/STD code: 06272
- ISO 3166 code: IN-BR
- Vehicle registration: BR-07
- Lok Sabha constituency: Darbhanga
- Vidhan Sabha constituency: Darbhanga Rural
- Website: darbhanga.bih.nic.in

Lehara, also known as Nehra, is a large village and significant commercial hub situated in the Manigachhi block of Darbhanga district in the state of Bihar, India.

== Governance ==
The village is administratively divided into two distinct Gram Panchayats to facilitate local governance:

- Nehra East (Nehra Purvi): This panchayat manages the eastern section and recently underwent development with the construction of a new Panchayat Sarkar Bhawan.
- Nehra West (Nehra Pashchimi): This covers the western administrative area and manages separate state and central development schemes.

== Geography and demographics ==
- Location & Administration: It falls under the Manigachhi Assembly constituency and is part of the Darbhanga division.
- Postal Code: The Pincode for Nehra is 847233.
- Connectivity: The village is approachable by all-weather roads and has its own police station, the Nehra Police Station.

== Political significance ==
Nehra gained national media attention for being the "village of sons-in-law" (Sasural) to two prominent Members of Parliament (MP):

- Gopal Jee Thakur: Current BJP MP from Darbhanga
- Kirti Azad: Former Darbhanga MP and current TMC MP from West Bengal.

== Economy and infrastructure ==
- Agriculture: The primary occupation remains agriculture, with a focus on local produce.
- Education: The village is an educational center for the block, housing High School Nehra and several primary schools like P.S. Nehra.
- Banking: The village is well-served by major financial institutions, including branches of Punjab National Bank and State Bank of India.

== History ==
The history of Nehra is deeply intertwined with the broader history of the Mithila region and the influence of the Darbhanga Raj. While formal archaeological excavations are limited, the village's historical identity is defined by its landownership patterns and educational foundations.

=== Zamindari Era & Darbhanga Raj ===
During the British Raj, Nehra was an integral part of the Darbhanga Raj, one of the largest zamindari estates in India.

- Estate Influence: Much of the village's early infrastructure and land distribution were managed under the patronage of the Maharaja of Darbhanga.
- Rajokhar Pokhar: This historic pond, central to the village, is believed to have been excavated during the reign of the royal family to serve as a perennial water source for the community and religious rituals.

=== Pre-Independence educational growth ===
Unlike many surrounding rural areas, Nehra established itself as a center for learning well before 1947.

- High School Nehra (1949): Founded just after independence, this institution was the result of local philanthropic efforts and land donations from prominent village families aimed at modernizing the region through education.
- Scholarly Tradition: The village has a long history of producing scholars in Maithili and Sanskrit, contributing to the intellectual movement of Mithilanchal.

=== Political evolution ===
Nehra’s history is unique due to its high-profile matrimonial connections, which shifted its status from a quiet agrarian village to a politically significant "VIP Village."

- The "Sasural" Legacy: The village gained national fame as the marital home for leaders like Kirti Azad (former MP and 1983 World Cup winner) and Gopal Jee Thakur. This status historically accelerated local development projects, such as electrified railway lines and paved roads.

=== Administrative transition ===
Originally a single administrative block, the village was eventually split into Nehra East and Nehra West to manage its growing population and the complex logistics of the Manigachhi Block.

== Education ==
Nehra serves as an educational hub for the Manigachhi block, with several long-standing government and private institutions.

=== Higher education ===
The village is home to a significant constituent college of Lalit Narayan Mithila University (LNMU):

- Jayanand College (J.N. College, Nehra): A government-funded co-educational institution established to provide undergraduate courses in Commerce, Science and Arts. It serves a large student population from Nehra and surrounding villages.

=== Secondary and senior secondary schools ===
There are separate large-scale government high schools for boys and girls:

- High School Nehra: Established in 1949, it is one of the oldest schools in the district, offering grades 9 to 12. It features a government building, a playground, and a library with over 700 books.
- Project Girls High School Nehra: Founded in 1985, it provides dedicated secondary education (grades 9–12) for female students.

=== Primary and middle schools ===
The village has a network of schools serving younger students, often categorized by locality:

- M.S. Nehra Girls: A government middle school (Grades 1–8) established in 1950.
- M.S. Nehra Balak: A central cluster school that oversees approximately 15 other small schools in the area.
- Primary School (P.S.) Nehra: A co-educational government primary school (Grades 1–5).
- Locality-based Schools: There are several smaller units like NPS Nehra (Yadav Tol) and Ps Rajwara Tole Nehra.

=== Private institutions ===
Several private schools offer English-medium education.

== J. N. College, Nehra: History ==
The history of higher education in Nehra is synonymous with Jayanand College (often abbreviated as J.N. College), which transformed the village into a regional academic hub.

=== Foundation and early history ===
- Establishment: Jayanand College was founded in 1970 through the collective efforts of local visionaries and philanthropists who wanted to provide higher education to the rural youth of the Manigachhi block.
- Naming: The college was named in honour of Pt. Jayanand Choudhary, a respected figure in the region.
- University Affiliation: Initially started as a private initiative, it later became a Constituent Unit of Lalit Narayan Mithila University (LNMU), Darbhanga. This transition allowed the college to receive government funding and follow a standardised curriculum. J.N. College Nehra Official Website.

=== Growth and academic expansion ===
- Diversification: While it began with a focus on Liberal Arts, the college expanded to include a full Science Faculty, offering undergraduate degrees (B.A., B.Com and B.Sc. Honours) in subjects like Physics, Chemistry, Mathematics, Botany, and Zoology.
- Catering to the Hinterland: Historically, the college served as the primary destination for students from nearby villages like Raghopur, Haripur, Bishanpur, Paithan Kabai, and Manigachhi, who previously had to travel to Darbhanga city for higher studies.

=== Political and social impact ===
- Student Politics: Given the village’s reputation for political awareness, the college has been a breeding ground for local leadership and student activism within the Mithila region.
- Modernisation: In recent decades, the college has integrated vocational elements and improved its infrastructure, including a dedicated library and laboratory facilities to meet the standards set by the University Grants Commission (UGC).

== Culture ==
Nehra is deeply rooted in the Mithila cultural heritage, known for its blend of traditional religious practices and a unique social reputation within the district.

The village is known for its traditional celebrations, particularly the Chhath festival held at the local Rajokhar Pokhar, which attracts devotees from across the Mithilanchal region.

=== Regional identity ===
- The "Paris of Mithilanchal": Locally, Nehra is often affectionately referred to as the “Paris of Mithilanchal”, a nickname that reflects its status as a well-developed, bustling village with urban-like amenities and a vibrant local market.
- Social Connectivity The village holds a unique social status as the Sasural (matrimonial home) of multiple high-profile political leaders, leading to its reputation as a well-connected and politically aware community.

=== Religious landmarks ===
The village is home to several significant religious sites that serve as centers for communal gatherings:

- Rajokhar Pokhar: A large local pond central to the village's identity. It is the primary site for the Chhath Puja festival, where thousands of devotees gather to offer prayers to the Sun God.
- Temples: Notable local shrines include the Mahavir Sthan, and several Shiva and Durga temples located within the Nehra West and East administrative areas.

=== Festivals and traditions ===
- Mithila Traditions: Residents participate in traditional Mithila folk festivals such as Sama Chakeva (celebrating brother-sister bonds) and Madhushravani.
- Art and Craft: Like much of the Darbhanga district, the village is influenced by Mithila (Madhubani) painting and local handicrafts such as Sikki-Mauni (grass-weaving) and clay-toy making.
- Cuisine: Traditional Maithil food is a staple, with local specialties including Makhana (fox nuts), varieties of river fish, and unique vegetable preparations like Tarua (vegetable fritters).

=== Annual fairs ===
Annual fairs (Melas) are common during major festivals like Kartik Purnima, Rama Navami, Janmashtami and Durga Puja, serving as both religious events and vital social-commercial hubs for the surrounding smaller hamlets.

== See also ==
- List of villages in Darbhanga district
