= Biraul Railway Station =

Railway station in Bihar

General information
- Location: Biraul Station Road, Biraul, Darbhanga, Bihar 847203; India
- Coordinates: 25°56′20.1″N 86°13′58.7″E
- Elevation: 46 metres (151 ft)
- System: Indian Railways Station
- Owner: Indian Railways
- Operator: East Central Railways
- Platforms: 2
- Tracks: 2

Construction
- Structure type: Standard on ground

Other information
- Status: Functional
- Station code: BIRL
- Zone(s): East Central Railway zone
- Division(s): Samastipur
Location
- Location within Bihar Location within India

Biraul Railway Station Code is BIRL, is a Railway Station in Darbhanga District of Bihar, state of India. It is under the administrative control of the Samastipur Division of the East Central Railway Zone of the Indian Railways. Here are some trains that are passing through the Biraul Railway Station like BIRL - DBG Passenger, BIRL- DBG Demu, DBG - BIRL Passenger, BIRL - SKI Passenger, DBG - BIRL Demu, and many more.

== Platforms ==
There are two platforms in Biraul Railway Station.

== Nearest airports ==
The nearest airports to Biraul Railway Station are:

- Vidyapati Airport
- Lok Nayak Jayaprakash Airport, Patna

== See also ==
- Darbhanga
- Laheriasarai
