= Lilu Miah =

Freedom fighter from bangladesh

- লিলু মিয়া
- Lilu Miah standing with a grenade ready to throw in April 1971
- Died: 17 April 1971; Thakurgaon, Rangpur, Bangladesh
- Cause of death: Martyred in the war of liberation
- Military career
- Allegiance: Pakistan (before 1971); Bangladesh
- Branch: East Pakistan Rifles
- Service years: 1966 - 1971
- Rank: Lance Nayek
- Units: Sector - VI; 9th Rifles Battalion
- Conflicts: Bangladesh Liberation War †
- Awards: Bir Bikrom

Lilu Miah (Bengali: লিলু মিয়া; died 1971) was a freedom fighter of the Liberation War of Bangladesh against Pakistani military occupation in 1971. He was recognized as a war hero, where the Bangladesh government awarded him the title of Bir Bikrom, the third-highest military honor, for his bravery in the war.

== Birth and education ==
Martyr Lilu Miah's ancestral home was in Kandi village of Lokmankhar in the Chhayasuti union of Kuliyarchar upazila, Kishoreganj District in what was once East Pakistan. His parents were Sona Miah and Sirennesa. He was married to Lalita Begum, with whom he shared two sons and daughters.

== Role in the liberation war ==
Before the liberation war, Lilu Miah served in the East Pakistan Rifles (EPR), a paramilitary border force. He held the rank of Lance Naik within the 9th Wing (now Battalion) of Dinajpur EPR Sector in 1971, headquartered in Thakurgaon town. During Operation Searchlight, more than 120 non-Bengali army soldiers were stationed at Thakurgaon Wing headquarters. Their presence contributed to uncertainty among the Bengali EPR troops based there.

On 28 March 1971, the Bengali EPR troops, including Miah, revolted. The clash between Bengali and non-Bengali EPRs in the wing lasted until March 30, 1971. Non-Bengali EPR and Pakistani army troops (about 115) were killed in the clashes. The EPR freedom fighters took part in the war, taking up positions in several locations, Bhatgaon (23 miles before Thakurgaon), Deviganj, and Shibganj. Defensive lines were also established at Khansama, Jaiganj, and Jharbati using various roads connecting Thakurgaon and Syedpur.

During the war of resistance, the freedom fighters lacked telephone or wireless communications. Runners were frequently used as a means of communication, a role Miah sometimes took on. In April 1971, Miah was attacked and ultimately killed by the Pakistan Army at Dosh Mile on the Dinajpur–Saidpur road. The freedom fighters had previously maintained a defensive position at Dosh Mile point, but withdrew a few days earlier after sustaining heavy casualties from intense attacks by the Pakistan Army. His body could not be recovered by his comrades; however, the local villagers later gave him a burial.

== Awards and honors ==
He was posthumously awarded the title of Bir Bikram for his outstanding contribution in the war of liberation, especially as a runner.

== Footnotes ==
- This article has been translated from the original report titled "তোমাদের এ ঋণ শোধ হবে না" published on 06 September 2012 in The Daily Prothom Alo. The Daily Prothom Alo has released a Creative Commons Attribution-Share-Alike 3.0 international license on Wikipedia (Permitted). The reports were written by Rashedur Rahman (also known as Tara Rahman) on behalf of The Daily Prothom Alo Liberation War Trust.
