= Sahiyara =

- village
- Location in Bihar, India Sahiyara (India)
- Coordinates: 26.43°N 85.29°E
- Country: India
- State: Bihar
- District: Sitamarhi
- Talukas: Bathnaha, Bihar

Languages
  - Official: Bajjika, Maithili, Hindi
- Time zone: UTC+5:30 (IST)
- PIN: 843332

Sahiyara is one of the villages in Bathnaha Tehsil in Sitamarhi district in the state of Bihar. Sahiyara is 18.1 km from Sitamarhi, the largest nearby town which is also the district capital. It is 132 km from Patna, the state capital. It is just 10 km from international India–Nepal border.

Sahiyara's Pin Code is 843332. Other villages under the territory of this Post Office (843332) are Sahiyara, Bahera, Majorganj, Bherrahiya, Bagaha.
