= Goramansingh =

- village
- A scene of flood

- Location within Bihar Location within India
- Coordinates: 25.9522°N 86.3256°E
- Country: India
- State: Bihar

Languages
  - Official: Maithili, Hindi Urdu
- Time zone: UTC+5:30 (IST)
- ISO 3166 code: IN-BR

Goramansingh also known as Gauramansingh is a small village in the Darbhanga district of Bihar, India. It is located approximately 62 kilometers east of Darbhanga (the district headquarters) and 12 kilometers east from its subdivisional headquarters of Biraul on the bank of the Kamala River in Bihar.

Goramansingh Darbhanga Bihar.

== Geography ==
Goramansingh is situated in the Darbhanga district of the state of Bihar in India. The village is located in the Gaura-Bauram block of the Biraul sub-division of Darbhanga.

== Economy ==
Goramansingh is one of the most underdeveloped areas in India. It does not have good roads. Every year in July floods hit the area and often cause damage. Flooded areas take a long time to dry out which leads to many problems, including financial hardship and human suffering.

Agriculture is the main occupation of the villagers. The Supaul Bazar is the main business hub of the village. People from remote areas often visit it in order to purchase goods.

== Politics ==
Panchayat	Goramansingh
Elected MP	Gopalji Thankur
Elected MLA	Swarna Singh
Prakhand Adyaksha	Prem Shankar Singh ( Builder and Developer ) This village is not a king maker but it has a great number of voters. In every election leaders come here but afterwards they never look back. Villagers are on their own. While some persons are trying to make a difference but without government help they are unable to do any good.

== Language and culture ==
=== Mithila, Maithil and Maithili ===
The Maithili language is widely spoken in the Mithila region (Darbhanga, Madhubani, Samastipur, Saharsa and Purnia district) of Bihar as well as Terai districts of Nepal. There is a lot of culture associated with this region: songs like "Bhagvati Song", "Batgavni", "Sohar", dances like Jaat-Jatin and Jhumar, festivals such as Chauthchandra, Ghari puja, Joor Sital and others.

"Baat Taakna" means "to wait"; a married girl is waiting for her husband in the dark night, but her husband loves the moonlight. He always comes in the moonlight to meet her. This song is based upon the culture of the Mithila.

=== Castes ===
The majority of people in Goramansingh are of the Chaupal caste. The villages is also the home of other castes such as Kayasth, Dhanuk, Badhay (carpenter), Khatvay, Muslim, Nai, Dhobi, Kumhar, Chamar Dom and a very small percentage of Brahman. OBC and SC/ST have high percentage in this village. They often decide the political game here. But under the influence of fraternity they work along with whole village.

=== Festivals ===
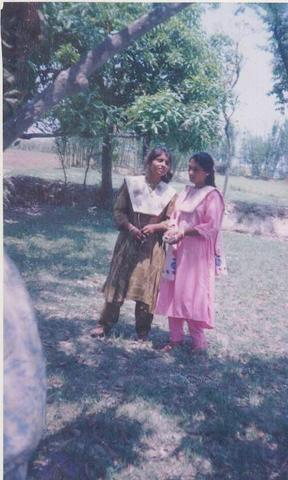
The natives of Goramansingh village talking to each other in Maithali language

Durga Puja: Durga Puja is one of the most celebrated festival of this village. Every year in Ashwin month people come here from many villages to visit. The temple is made by villagers' contribution. In Dashara whole village contribute money as Chanda to make this festival stunning. Deities are made of Sangmarmar. On the last day of Dashara people gathers in Mandir Parisar for feast.

MakarSankranti: This festival takes place on 14 or 15 January. On the eve of this festival, people of the village take a holy bath in the pond in the winter morning. After that, they light a fire to warm themselves. The children enjoy eating a special breakfast in front of the fire. The morning breakfast on the day of Makarsankrati includes sweets made from parched rice, flattened rice, tilkut, sugarcane, dahi (curd or yogurt) and more. Women perform puja in their homes and distribute Prasaad among the children and other members of their family. Khichri is a very important dish on this day.

Holi: On the eve of the festival people enjoy different colour and gulal. The way of playing Holi in the village is somewhat different from its neighbouring area. Villagers first play Holi only with colour from 8am to 1pm. After 1pm, they play only gulal till 8pm. Villagers shake hands with each other and take blessings from the elders during gulal spraying.

Vaisakhi or Joor Sital: This festival always falls on 14 April just after Amavasaya (New Moon) of the Chaitra month, and it marks the beginning of the new year. The Amavasaya of Chaitra month is the last day of the Hindu year. The next day marks the beginning of the new year according to the Hindu calendar. The festival is known by various names in different parts of India: Vaisakhi in Northern India and Vishu in the Kerala region. People of the Mithila region know this festival as Joor Sital. Villagers of the Mithila region celebrate the festival in different ways. On the day of the Joor Sital, every elder of each family gets up early in the morning. They give blessings to every younger one. The way of blessing is taking water (Jal) in a bended palm leaf (Htheli) and placing their palm on the head of younger ones at least three or five times. People perform puja at home in a mango garden. They offer Baasi (cooked food in night), Vari and Rice to God. Every child pours water onto the dry land. They irrigate all plants and trees in their own garden.

Chhath: The festival of the Chhath falls on the sixth day of the Hindu month of Kartik (late October or mid-November) in the Hindu lunar calendar every year. The Chhath falls on the month of Kartik, known as Dala Chhath. Another type of Chhath is Chaiti Chhath which falls on the month of Chaitra (late April or mid-May). The Dala Chhath is one of the holier festivals for Biharis. The way of celebrating Chhath in the village Goramansingh is almost the same as celebrating Chhath in the rest of Bihar. There are many songs dedicated to the Chhath festival.

== Wildlife ==
Many migratory birds land in marshes around the village from December to March. These birds originate from Nepal, Bhutan, Pakistan, Tibet, China, Siberia and Mongolia. Important migratory birds seen in the village include:

- Local name: Lalshar, Dighouch, Mail, Nakta, Silli, Adhani, Harial, Chaha, Karan, Ratwa, Gaiber
- Biological names: Dalmatian pelican, Indian darter bar-headed goose, white-winged wood duck, marbled duck, Baer's pochard, Siberian crane, Indian skimmer and Oriental goosander.
