= Abdul Bari Siddiqui =

Indian politician

Principal General Secretary of Rashtriya Janata Dal
- Incumbent
- Assumed office 2020
- President: Lalu Prasad Yadav

Member (MLA) of Bihar Legislative Assembly
- In office 2010–2020
- Preceded by: constituency created
- Succeeded by: Mishri Lal Yadav
- Constituency: Alinagar
- In office 1995–2010
- Preceded by: Mahendra Jha Azad
- Succeeded by: constituency abolished
- Constituency: Bahera
- In office 1977–1979
- Preceded by: constituency created
- Succeeded by: Parma Nand Jha
- Constituency: Bahera

Cabinet Minister of Government of Bihar
- In office 1995–2005
- Chief Minister: Lalu Prasad Yadav and Rabri Devi

Finance Minister of Government of Bihar
- In office 20 November 2015 – 27 July 2017
- Chief Minister: Nitish Kumar
- Succeeded by: Sushil Kumar Modi

Leader of Opposition Bihar Legislative Assembly
- In office 6 December 2010 – 19 June 2013
- Preceded by: Rabri Devi
- Succeeded by: Nand Kishore Yadav

Personal details
- Born: 23 December 1953 (age 72) Alinagar, Bihar, India
- Party: Rashtriya Janata Dal

Abdul Bari Siddiqui (born 23 December 1953) is an Indian politician who was the Finance Minister of Bihar. He was a MLA representing Alinagar, Darbhanga, Bihar. Siddiqui is a member of the Rashtriya Janata Dal political party. He won in the 2015 Bihar Legislative Assembly election. In 2019 Loksabha elections he contested from Darbhanga and lost to Gopal Jee Thakur of BJP by a margin of 2,67,979 votes.

Previously, Siddiqui was the Leader of Opposition following the 2010 Bihar Legislative Assembly election until the split between JD(U) and BJP led the latter to leave the government and become the official opposition.

Siddiqui was elected the chairman of the Bihar Cricket Association in September 2015 defeating former association president Vinod Kumar. He is also the head of the Bihar Badminton Association. He is known to be a close associate of Lalu Prasad Yadav. When asked in 2009, to contest the Madhubani Parliamentary Elections, he filed his nomination and unsuccessfully contested, losing by the margin of 10k votes, which led to trailingredients of Dr. Shakeel Ahmed to 3rd position. He again contested 2014 Madhubani Loksabha elections unsuccessfully losing to veteran BJP leader Hukumdev Narayan Yadav by a margin of 15k votes. He is 7th time MLA. Previously he used to contest from Bahera. After delimination of that constituency, he contested from Alinagar.

Abdul Bari Siddiqui representing JP defeated Harinath Mishra of Congress in 1977 from Bahera, which was the first time he became an MLA. Siddiqui has won 7 times as a Member of Bihar Legislative Assembly.

His son, Anis Bari is currently a MC/MPA 2023 candidate at Harvard Kennedy School, is an author and entrepreneur who runs an Ed-tech start-up based in Delhi.
