= Vijay Mishra (disambiguation) =

Vijay Mishra may refer to:

- Vijay Kumar Mishra, Indian politician
- Vijay Mishra (gangster), Indian gangster and politician
- Vijay Mishra, academic from Fiji
