= Uchhati =

Uchhati is a village in the Biraul block of Biraul subdivision in Darbhanga district, Bihar, India. This is one of the populous villages in Biraul block. This is hardly one kilometer from Biraul block and two kilometers from Supaul Bazar (Darbhanga). Darbhanga is at a distance of 48 km from this village. The link road of Darbhanga-Saharsa via Biraul passes through this village.

== Demographics ==
The population of this village according to the 2011 census is 8387. The village code is 227739. The sc population is 1254. The ST population is 1. The no. of literate persons is 3578. A branch of the Kamala River passes through the west side of the village. The twin villages Bhadhar-Paghari is on the southeast side of this village. The other twin villages Benk-Ballia are on the northwest side of this village. Supaul -Bazar & Biraul are on the north side of this village. The village Sonepur is on the east side of this village. The village Kalana is on the south side of this village. Ucchhati middle school is the only school in this village. Now this village is nominated to city council Biraul.
