= Jibesh Kumar =

Indian politician (born 1973)

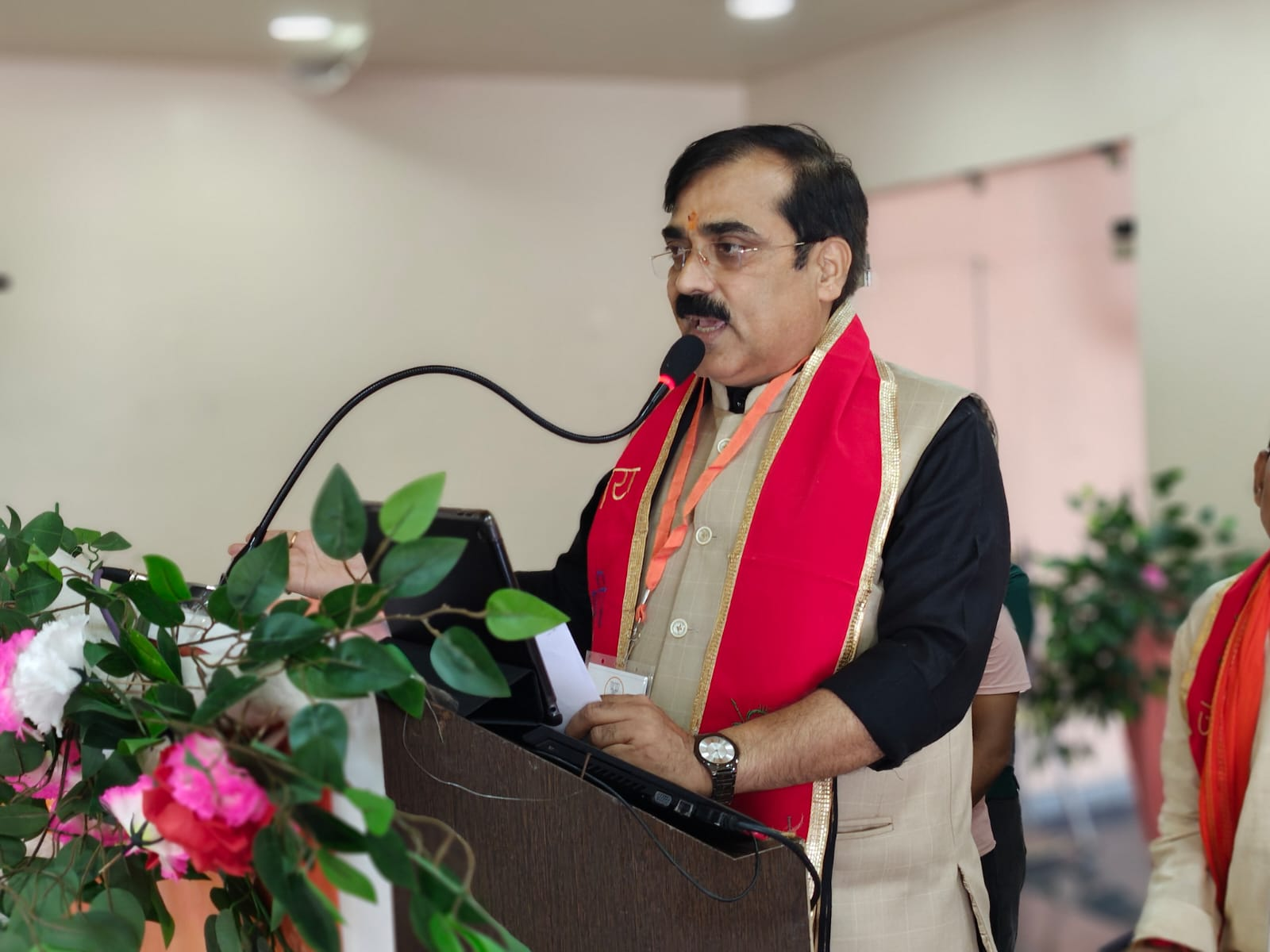

Minister of Urban Development & Housing Government of Bihar
- In office 26 February 2025 – 20 November 2025
- Chief Minister: Nitish Kumar
- Preceded by: Nitin Nabin
- Succeeded by: Nitin Nabin

Minister of Labour Resources Government of Bihar
- In office 16 November 2020 – 9 August 2022
- Chief Minister: Nitish Kumar
- Preceded by: Vijay Kumar Sinha
- Succeeded by: Surendra Ram

Minister of Information & Technology Government of Bihar
- In office 9 February 2021 – 9 August 2022
- Chief Minister: Nitish Kumar
- Preceded by: Tarkishore Prasad
- Succeeded by: Mohammad Israil Mansuri

Minister of Mines & Geology Government of Bihar
- In office 16 November 2020 – 9 February 2021
- Chief Minister: Nitish Kumar
- Preceded by: Brij Kishor Bind
- Succeeded by: Janak Ram

Minister of Tourism Government of Bihar
- In office 16 November 2020 – 9 February 2021
- Chief Minister: Nitish Kumar
- Preceded by: Krishna Kumar Rishi
- Succeeded by: Narayan Prasad

Member of Bihar Legislative Assembly
- Incumbent
- Assumed office 2015
- Preceded by: Rishi Mishra
- Constituency: Jale

Personal details
- Born: 25 July 1973 (age 52) Bihar
- Party: Bharatiya Janata Party
- Spouse: Suchita Mishra
- Children: 1 son and 1 daughter
- Parent: Late Ram Kripal Mishra
- Education: BSc, LLB, MA, PhD
- Alma mater: Lalit Narayan Mithila University

Jibesh Kumar (born 25 July 1973) is an Indian politician belonging to the Bharatiya Janata Party. He is currently a member of the Bihar Legislative Assembly from Jale constituency and served as Minister of Urban Development & Housing Department in Bihar Government.

Jibesh Kumar was Minister of Labour Resources Department and Information Technology in Bihar Government in Seventh Nitish Kumar ministry from 16 Nov. 2020 to 9 August 2022.

== Political background ==
Jibesh Kumar was an active member of Akhil Bharatiya Vidyarthi Parishad from 1981 to 1998. Jibesh Kumar was working as a Primary Member from 1998 to 2002 and he has been working as an Active Member of Bhartiya Janta Party since 2002.

The first time he was elected to the Bihar Legislative Assembly was from the Jale constituency as a member of the Bharatiya Janata Party in 2015.

In the 2020 election, he had won from the same seat Jale constituency with a margin of 21,796 votes and was elected for the second time for the Bihar Legislative Assembly as a Member of Bharatiya Janata Party.

In the 2025 Bihar Legislative Assembly election, Jibesh Kumar defeated Rishi Mishra from the same seat Jale Constituency by a margin of 21,862 votes. With this victory, he was elected to the Bihar Legislative Assembly for the third time as a BJP MLA.

== Electoral performance ==
Year	Constituency	Party	Result	% Vote	Vote margin
2025	Jale	BJP	Won	50.16	21,862
2020	Jale	BJP	Won	51.66	21,796
2015	Jale	BJP	Won	41.69	4,620
