= Pali, Darbhanga =

Pali
- Village
- Location in Bihar, India Pali (India)
- Coordinates: 26.056638°N 86.309431°E
- Country: India
- State: Bihar
- District: Darbhanga

Population (2011)
  - Total: 13,125

Languages
  - Official: Hindi, Maithili
- Time zone: UTC+5:30 (IST)
- PIN: 847427
- ISO 3166 code: IN-BR
- Vehicle registration: BR-07
- Nearest city: Darbhanga
- Lok Sabha constituency: Darbhanga
- Vidhan Sabha constituency: Alinagar
- Website: darbhanga.nic.in

Pali is a village located in the Ghanshyampur block of Darbhanga district in the Indian state of Bihar, India. Pali stands out as one of the most popular villages in the region. Situated approximately 2 km from Ghanshyampur and approximately 49 km from the district headquarter, Darbhanga, Pali is easily accessible by road and is surrounded by a network of villages that contribute to its rural landscape.

Pali, with the PIN code 847427, has its postal head office in Ghanshyampur. Nearby villages include Mahathwar (1 km), Punhad (3 km), Hanuman Nagar (4 km), Ganoun (5 km), Salahpur Lagma (5 km), and Mansara (6 km). The village is bordered by Alinagar Block to the west, Kiratpur Block also to the west, Gaurabauram Block to the south, and Tardih Block to the north. Additionally, the cities of Jhanjharpur, Supaul, Saharsa, and Madhubani are nearby located to the village. Notably, Pali is situated on the border of Darbhanga and Madhubani districts, with Madhepur in Madhubani district to the north.

== Geography ==
The village is characterized by its rural landscape, with agricultural fields surrounding it. The region experiences a tropical monsoon climate, with a hot summer, a rainy season from June to September, and a mild winter.

== Civic administration ==
=== Police station ===
Ghanshyampur Police Station has jurisdiction over the entire Ghanshyampur block, including Pali village. It is responsible for maintaining law and order, addressing public safety concerns, and handling crime prevention and investigation within its area of operation.

== Demographics ==
Maithili is the official and spoken language of Pali. Maithil Brahmins dominate the village population, with several other castes living in the village and nearby villages.

According to the 2011 Census of India, Pali village had a total population of 13,125 of which 6,787 (51.71%) were males and 6,338 (48.29%) were females. There were 1,270 children in the age range of 0 to 6 years. The total number of literate people in Pali was 7,811 ( which is 59.51% out of the total population).

== Economy ==
The economy of Pali is predominantly agrarian, with the majority of residents engaged in farming. Key crops include rice, wheat, and pulses. Additionally, some villagers are involved in small-scale industries and trade.

== Transport ==
The village lacks a railway station within a 10 km radius. The nearest major Railway station is Darbhanga Junction. Darbhanga city is well-connected to Pali by road, enabling residents to access larger markets, educational institutions, and healthcare facilities in nearby areas.

== Education ==
The village has some government primary and higher secondary school and a few educational institutions catering to the local population. Notably, Bal Kalyan Public School, a CBSE affiliated 10+2 private school, serves Pali and surrounding areas. For higher education, residents have to travel to nearby cities, which offer more advanced educational facilities and specialized courses.
