= Mahathwar =

- Village
- Location in Bihar, India Mahathwar (India)
- Coordinates: 26°2′30″N 86°19′5″E
- Country: India
- State: Bihar
- District: Darbhanga

Population (2011)
  - Total: 4,523

Languages
  - Official: Hindi, Maithili
- PIN: 847427
- Lok Sabha: Darbhanga
- Vidhan Sabha: Alinagar

Mahathwar is a village in Darbhanga district of Bihar, India. It forms part of the traditional Mithila region, known for its rich cultural and linguistic heritage.

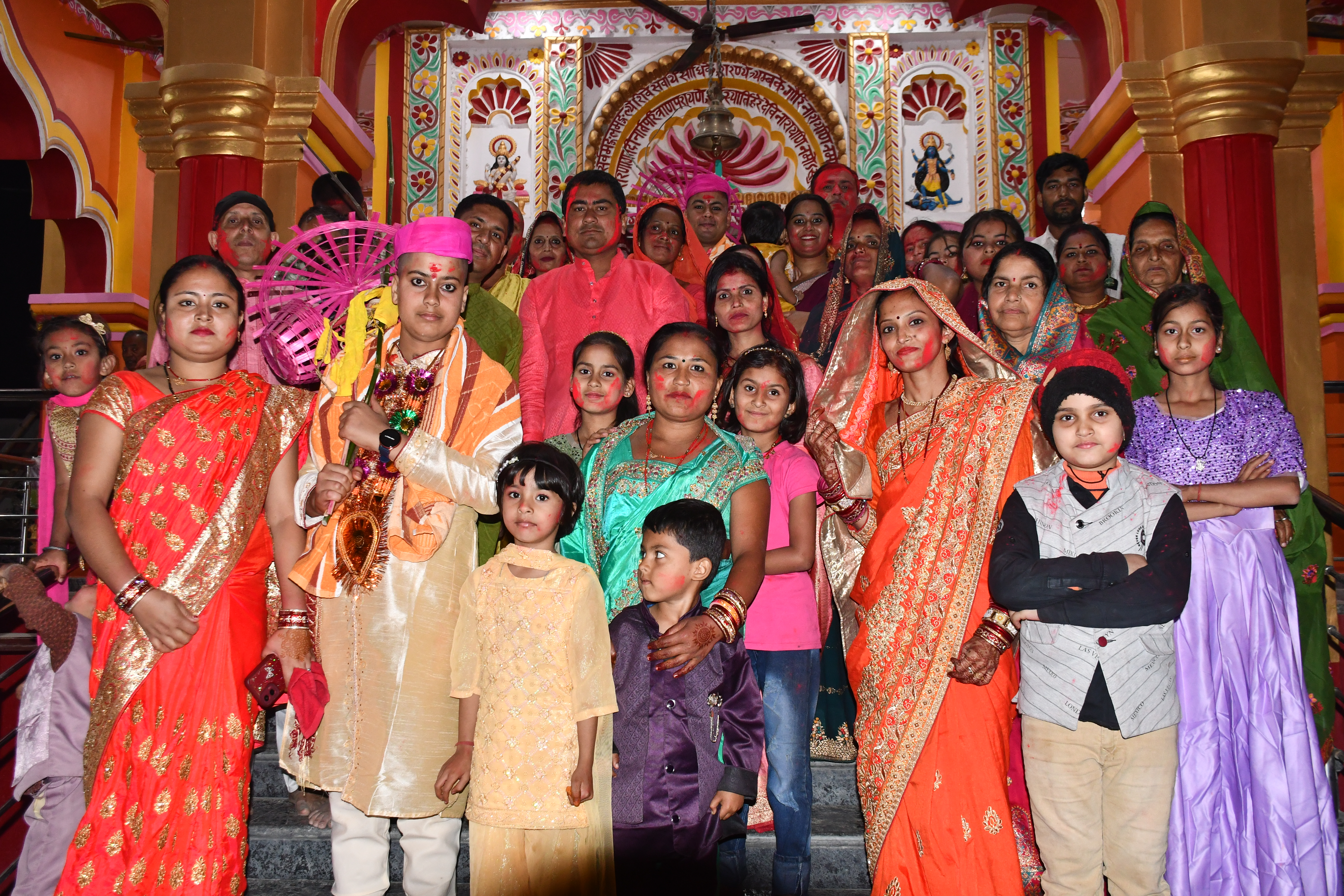
"A prominent temple situated in the village constitutes an important centre of religious and cultural life."

== Geographic and administrative ==
Mahathwar village comes under Ghanshyampur block and it is located 3 kms. south of the block office. It is bound on the east by the Shambhu chowk, on the north by Pali village and on the south by Chaur (or low lying agricultural land filled up by flood water) and on the west by Hari Mushari tola and Galma village.

- Mahathwar formerly fell under Ghanshyampur Gram Panchayat but now falls under Lagma Panchayat following the dissolution of the former, Ghanshyampur’s inclusion in a Nagar Panchayat, and the legal determination in Shailendra Kumar v. State of Bihar.

== Demographics ==
- The village is demographically dominated by Maithil Brahmins, alongside a diverse presence of other caste communities residing both within the village and in the adjoining rural areas.
- Mahathwar has a total of 1,011 families residing in the village. According to the 2011 Census of India, the village has a population of 4,523, of which 2,335 are males and 2,188 are females.

In Mahathwar, 679 children aged 0–6 constitute 15.01% of the total population. The overall sex ratio is 937 females per 1,000 males, exceeding Bihar’s average of 918, while the child sex ratio of 1,051 is higher than the state average of 935. The female-to-male ratio is 88.4%, lower than the state average of 91.93%. The literacy rate was 68.42%, higher than Bihar’s 61.80%, with male literacy at 78.64% and female literacy at 57.28%. Of the total population, 1,328 people were engaged in work. Of these, 52.26% were classified as main workers, who had worked for six months or more during the year, while 47.74% were marginal workers, who had worked for less than six months. Among the main workers, 224 were cultivators who owned or co-owned land, and 253 were agricultural labourers.

== Economy and livelihood ==
Agriculture is the dominant livelihood, with residents primarily engaged in cultivating crops such as paddy, wheat, and pulses. The region benefits from seasonal monsoon rains and groundwater irrigation. Small-scale trade and dairy farming also contribute to the local economy.

== Culture and society ==
The social fabric of Mahathwar reflects Maithil traditions, with Maithili as the primary language of daily life. Festivals such as Chhath Puja, Holi, and Diwali, Lakshmi Puja (Kojagara), Saraswati Puja and Krishna Janmashtami are central to local cultural expression, often accompanied by folk music and community gatherings typical of the Mithila region.

- Lakshmi Puja is among the most prominent festivals of Mahathwar. Initiated in 1960 by Dr. Jankivallabh as a modest religious observance, it has gradually evolved into a celebrated cultural event across the Darbhanga region. Commencing annually on Kojagara (Sharad Purnima), the festivities continue for two to three days under the stewardship of the Lakshmi Puja Samiti.
- Krishna Puja, centred on the celebration of Shri Krishna Janmashtami, constitutes another significant religious observance in Mahathwar. Originating around 1965 as a family-led initiative, it has attained widespread recognition through sustained devotion and innovative organisation. In 2010, Durga Puja was incorporated into the celebrations, further enriching its cultural significance.
- Saraswati Puja heralds the advent of spring and is observed with profound reverence for Goddess Saraswati, the embodiment of wisdom and learning. Exquisitely crafted idols are installed in educational institutions and community spaces, and the festivities culminate with their ceremonial immersion in rivers and ponds.

== Connectivity ==
Mahathwar connects to nearby towns via rural roads linking it to Ghanshyampur and other villages in Darbhanga district. The nearest urban centers, including Darbhanga city, provide access to markets, education, and healthcare facilities, while the area remains primarily agrarian and community-oriented in character.

Mahathwar village possesses essential civic amenities such as potable water supply, electricity, and primary education, whereas transportation, healthcare, and banking facilities necessitate reliance on adjoining localities.

- Education : There are two schools in Mahathwar. One is for Majority communities and second one for Minority communities. It is a secondary government school. The school is till class VIII. The mid-day meal facilities available for all students.
- Local Market : The village primarily relies on Shambhu Chowk and local retail establishments for daily necessities, while Pali and Rasiyari serve as the principal commercial centres for broader purchasing requirements.
- Health : The village enjoys a reasonably satisfactory healthcare status. In the absence of a government hospital, residents largely depend upon private medical practitioners and frequently seek advanced treatment at Ghanshyampur and Darbhanga. Government-provided ambulance services remain accessible for medical emergencies within Mahathwar and its surrounding areas.
- Banking and financial services are absent within the village. However, a nationalized banking facility, Bank of India, is located at Shambhu Chowk in close proximity.

== Nearest Villages ==
- Ghanshyampur
- Pali
- Galma
