= Mishri Lal Yadav =

Indian politician

Member of Bihar Legislative Assembly
- In office 2020–2025
- Preceded by: Abdul Bari Siddiqui
- Succeeded by: Maithili Thakur
- Constituency: Alinagar

Member of Bihar Legislative Council
- In office 17 July 2003 – 16 July 2009
- Constituency: Darbhanga Local Authorities

Personal details
- Born: 10 January 1957 (age 69)
- Party: Independent
- Other political affiliations: Bharatiya Janata Party (till October 2025)
- Occupation: Politician

Mishrilal Yadav (born 10 January 1957) is an Indian politician from Bihar and a member of the Bihar Legislative Assembly. Yadav won the Alinagar Assembly constituency on the VIP ticket in the 2020 Bihar Legislative Assembly election. He is one of the three members who defected to NDA on 23 March 2022.

== Resignation from the BJP ==
Yadav announced his resignation from the Bharatiya Janata Party. According to media reports, Yadav was reportedly unhappy over speculation that he would not be granted a party ticket in the upcoming elections, and that the BJP might instead field singer Maithili Thakur as a candidate.

Following his resignation, Yadav accused the party of being anti-Dalit and neglecting leaders from marginalised communities.
