= Maithili Thakur =

Indian politician, former singer (born 2000)

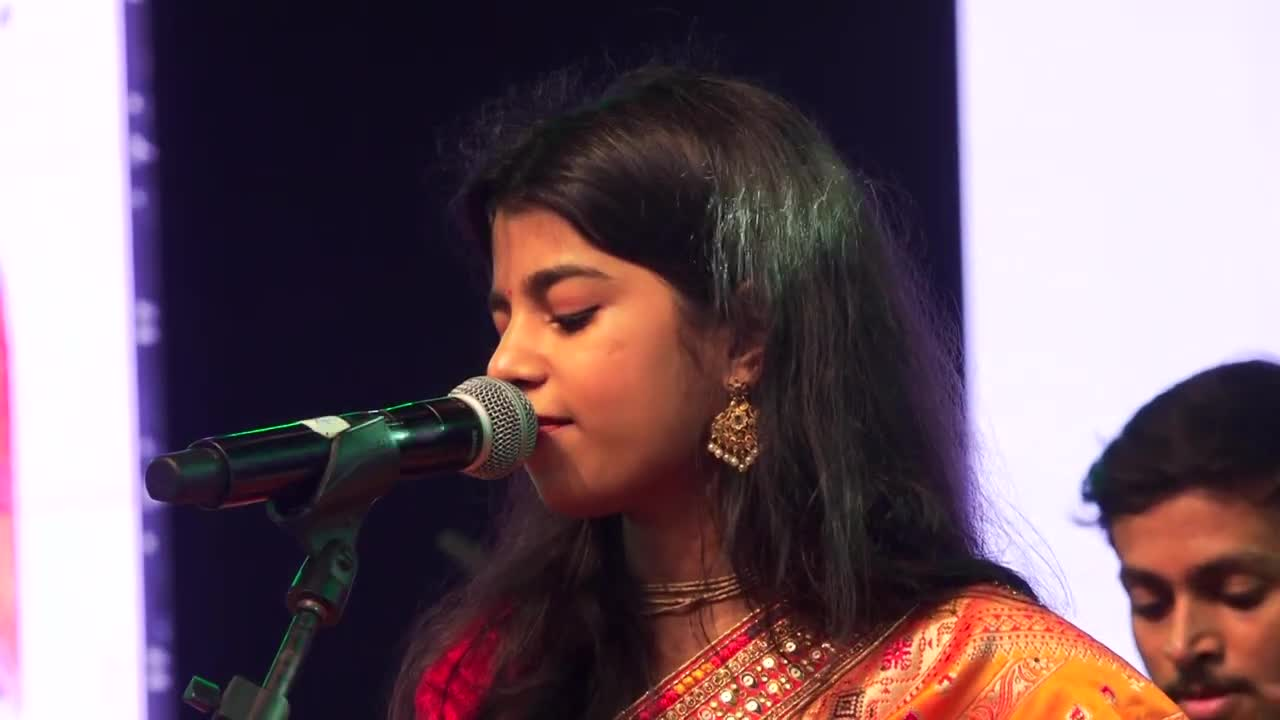
- Maithili Thakur performing at Sanskruti Arts Festival in 2023
- Born: Maithili Thakur; 25 July 2000 (age 26); Madhubani, Bihar, India
- Occupations: Member of Legislative Assembly, Alinagar, Bihar (incumbent); Singer
- Years active: 2025 - present (politician), 2012–present (singer)
- Parents: Ramesh Thakur (father); Bharti Thakur (mother)
- Relatives: Rishav Thakur, Ayachi Thakur
- Musical career
- Genres: Filmi; Indian classical; Maithili; Bhojpuri
- Instruments: Vocals; Guitar; Harmonium; Piano; Tabla

Member of Bihar Legislative Assembly
- Incumbent
- Assumed office 1 December 2025
- Preceded by: Mishri Lal Yadav
- Constituency: Alinagar

YouTube information
- Channel: Maithili Thakur
- Years active: 11 January 2014–present
- Genres: Religious music; Bhajan
- Subscribers: 5.24M
- Views: 880M
- Last updated: 23 March 2026

Maithili Thakur (born 25 July 2000) is an Indian politician and former classical playback singer. She is the current Member of Legislative Assembly for the Alinagar constituency seat in Bihar.

== Early life ==
Thakur was born in Benipatti, Madhubani district, Bihar to a Maithil musician and music teacher working in Delhi Ramesh Thakur and Bharti Thakur. Maithili, along with her two brothers, Rishav and Ayachi were trained by their grandfather and father in Maithili Folk, Hindustani classical music, Harmonium and Tabla. Realising his daughter's potential around the age of 6, her father relocated themselves to Dwarka in New Delhi for better opportunities. Her first music teacher, her grandfather, began teaching her music when she was only 4 years old. At the age of 10, she started singing at jagrans and other musical functions.

== Music career ==
In 2011, Thakur appeared in Little Champs, a singing competition television series telecast in Zee TV. Four years later, she contested in Indian Idol Junior, telecast in Sony TV. She won the "I Genius Young Singing Star" competition in 2016, following which she launched her album, Ya Rabba (Universal Music).

=== Rising stars ===
In 2017, Thakur was a contestant in the season 1 of Rising Star, a television singing competition. Maithili was the first finalist of the show, singing Om Namah Shivaya which gained her direct entry into the final. She was runner up, losing out by just two votes. Following the show, her internet popularity rose significantly.

=== 2019 onwards ===
After a huge success from videos on Facebook and YouTube the trio has been performing at various National and International Events, Literature Fests. Maithili has been awarded Atal Mithila Samman by the Government of India. In 2019 Maithili and her two brothers, Rishav and Ayachi, were made the brand ambassadors of Madhubani by the Election Commission. Rishav is on the tabla and Ayachi is a singer and performs often on percussion as well. She was awarded Lokmat Sur Jytosna National Music Award 2021 by the Information & broadcast Minister Anurag Thakur.

== Political career ==
In 2025, several media outlets reported that Thakur was considering entering politics ahead of the Bihar Legislative Assembly elections. She met with Bharatiya Janata Party (BJP) leaders, including Vinod Tawde and Union Minister Nityanand Rai, prompting speculation about a possible candidature from her native constituency of Benipatti in Madhubani district.

Subsequently she stood for elections from Alinagar constituency seat in the Bihar Legislative Assembly elections and won the seat. Contesting on the BJP ticket, she defeated her nearest rival, Binod Mishra from the Rashtriya Janta Dal (RJD) by around 11,700 votes. She was the youngest ever member of the 18th Bihar Assembly.

== Awards and recognition ==
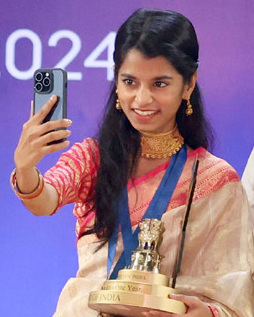
Maithili Thakur with Cultural Ambassador of the Year Award 2024

- Maithili Thakur was awarded the Cultural Ambassador of the Year Award by the Prime Minister of India at the inaugural National Creators Award on 8 March 2024.

== See also ==
- Madhubani art
