= Jharbaria =

- Village
- Nickname: Village Jharbaria
- Location of Jharbaria in Bihar Jharbaria (India)
- Coordinates: 25°58′13″N 86°06′29″E
- Country: India
- State: Bihar
- District: Darbhanga district

Area
  - Total: 1.1 sq mi (2.8 km^{2})

Population
  - Total: 2,000

Languages
  - Official: Hindi/Maithili
  - Spoken: Maithili
- Time zone: UTC+5:30 (IST)
- PIN: 847105
- Area code: 06272

Jharbaria is a village in the Indian state of Bihar located near Baheri town in Darbhanga District. It is 36 kilometres (22 mi) southeast of Darbhanga. At the 2011 census, Jharbaria had a population of 2,000. People of the village are mostly dependent on agricultural income along with government jobs.

== Neighbouring Village ==
Bandhuli (1 km), Inay (3 km), Havidih (5 km), Madhuban ( 7 km ), Rajwara ( 5 km ), Pawra ( 4 km ), Baheri ( 8.5 km ) are the nearby villages to Jharbaria. Jharbaria is surrounded by Baheri Block towards west, Biraul Block towards East, Benipur towards North.

== Transport ==
Jharbaria is well connected with Baheri and Darbhanga via road services. The nearest railway is Darbhanga Junction, which connects a very large part of North Bihar and Tarai of Nepal with the rest of India as major Railhead. It is the main station of Darbhanga & Madhubani. Another railway station of the city is known as Laheriasarai Railway Station. Laheriasarai is famous for the Lah (Lahthi).

== Education ==
Education level in Jharbaria village is rapidly increasing. The village has a government primary school beside private schools for elementary/primary education. A nearby college and high school in Baheri provides an opportunity for higher education.

== Climate ==
Jharbaria has a humid subtropical climate (Köppen climate classification Cwa).

Climate data for Jharbaria (Darbhanga)
Month	Jan	Feb	Mar	Apr	May	Jun	Jul	Aug	Sep	Oct	Nov	Dec	Year
Record high °C (°F)	30.4 (86.7)	33.9 (93.0)	39.9 (103.8)	42.0 (107.6)	41.9 (107.4)	43.4 (110.1)	39.1 (102.4)	38.4 (101.1)	39.6 (103.3)	39.2 (102.6)	33.9 (93.0)	29.9 (85.8)	43.4 (110.1)
Mean daily maximum °C (°F)	22.1 (71.8)	25.8 (78.4)	31.0 (87.8)	34.1 (93.4)	35.0 (95.0)	34.9 (94.8)	32.5 (90.5)	32.8 (91.0)	32.5 (90.5)	31.6 (88.9)	28.0 (82.4)	24.8 (76.6)	30.68 (87.22)
Mean daily minimum °C (°F)	9.2 (48.6)	11.0 (51.8)	15.1 (59.2)	19.1 (66.4)	21.2 (70.2)	22.9 (73.2)	23.8 (74.8)	24.2 (75.6)	23.8 (74.8)	21.2 (70.2)	15.8 (60.4)	10.6 (51.1)	18.18 (64.72)
Record low °C (°F)	−0.2 (31.6)	−0.2 (31.6)	3.9 (39.0)	9.2 (48.6)	10.4 (50.7)	15.9 (60.6)	18.7 (65.7)	19.4 (66.9)	18.9 (66.0)	12.7 (54.9)	7.2 (45.0)	2.4 (36.3)	−0.2 (31.6)
Average precipitation mm (inches)	13.0 (0.51)	14.0 (0.55)	9.0 (0.35)	29.0 (1.14)	76.0 (2.99)	139.0 (5.47)	353.0 (13.90)	254.0 (10.00)	193.0 (7.60)	73.0 (2.87)	6.0 (0.24)	7.0 (0.28)	1,166 (45.9)
Average rainy days	1.6	1.7	1.6	2.6	4.6	7.6	16.4	12.2	10.5	3.4	0.5	1.0	63.7
Average relative humidity (%)	68	63	49	56	60	70	78	79	79	73	66	67	67
Source: NOAA (1971–1990)

== Gallery ==
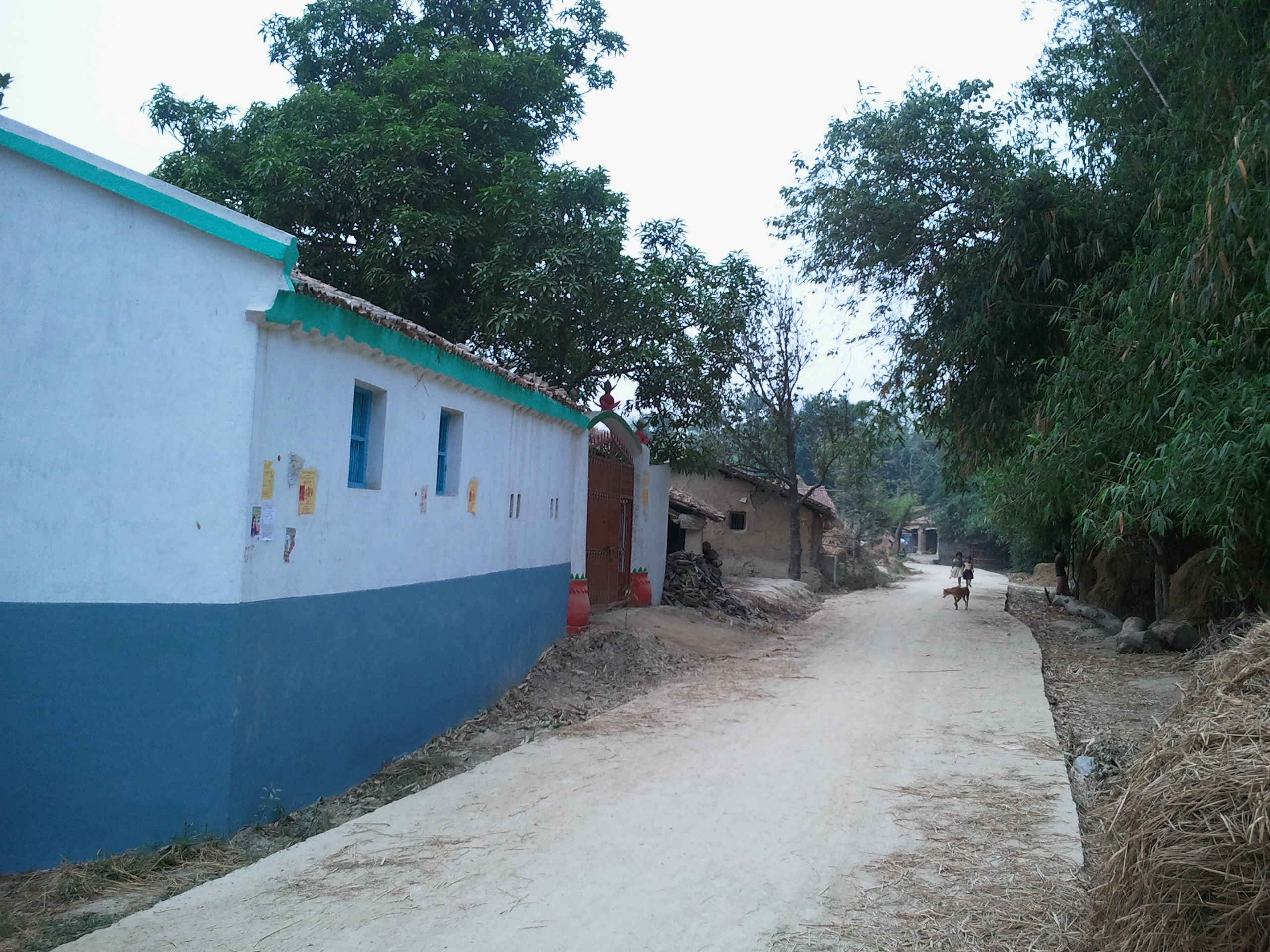
A view of road linking Jharbaria with Baheri Bazaar and other villages

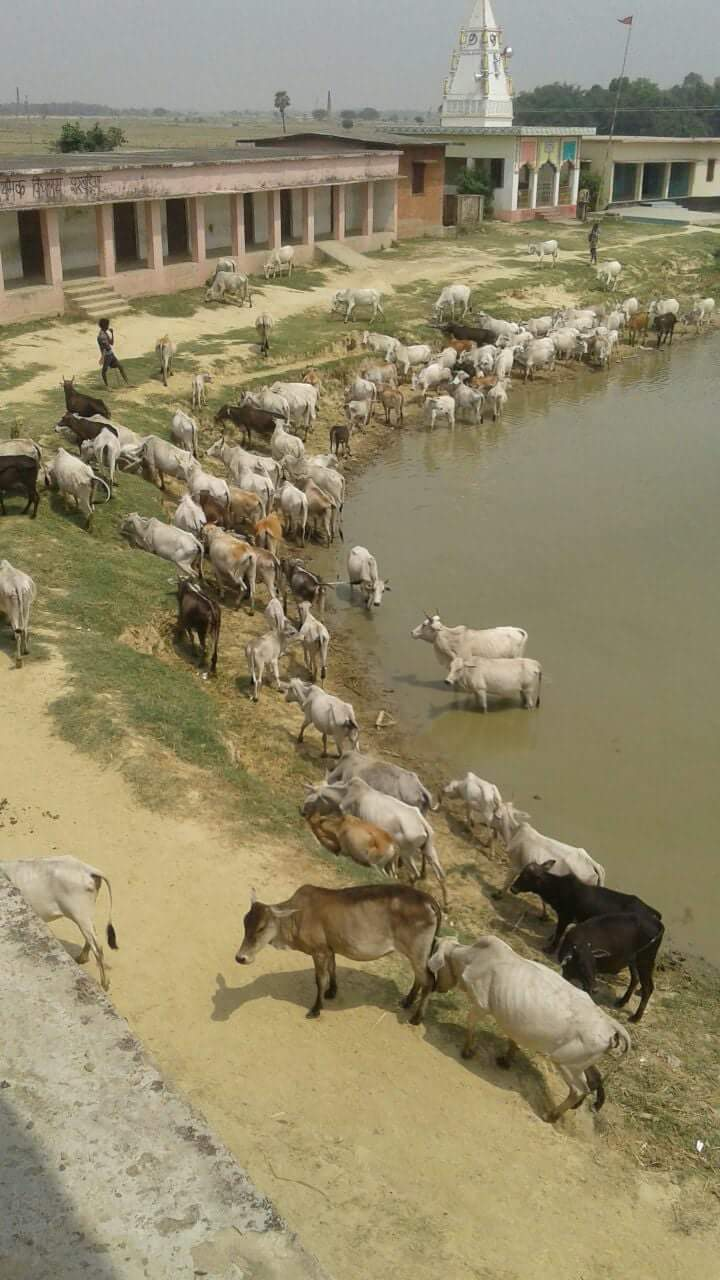
Primary School, Jharbaria

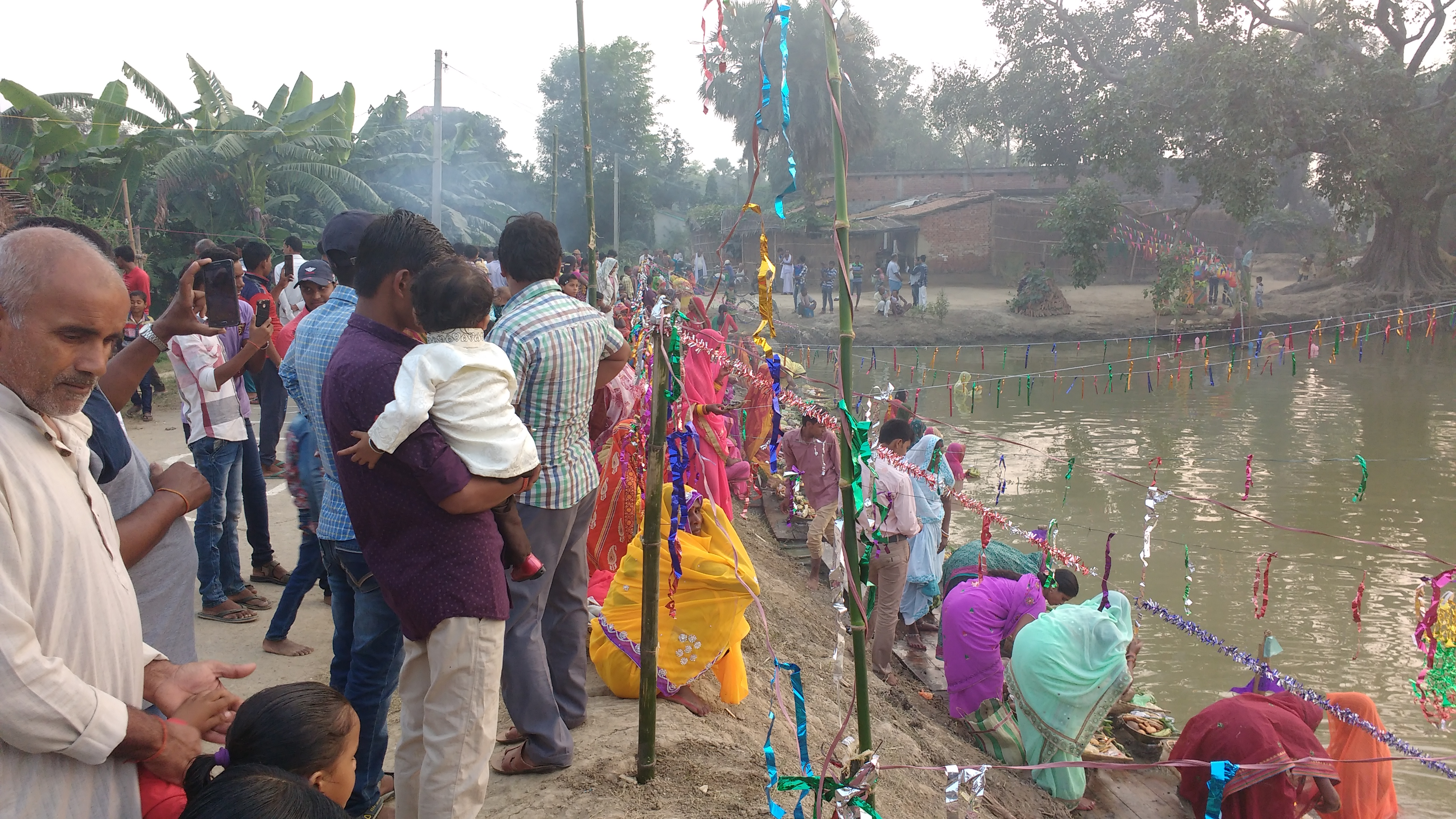
Chhath Puja celebration in Jharbaria

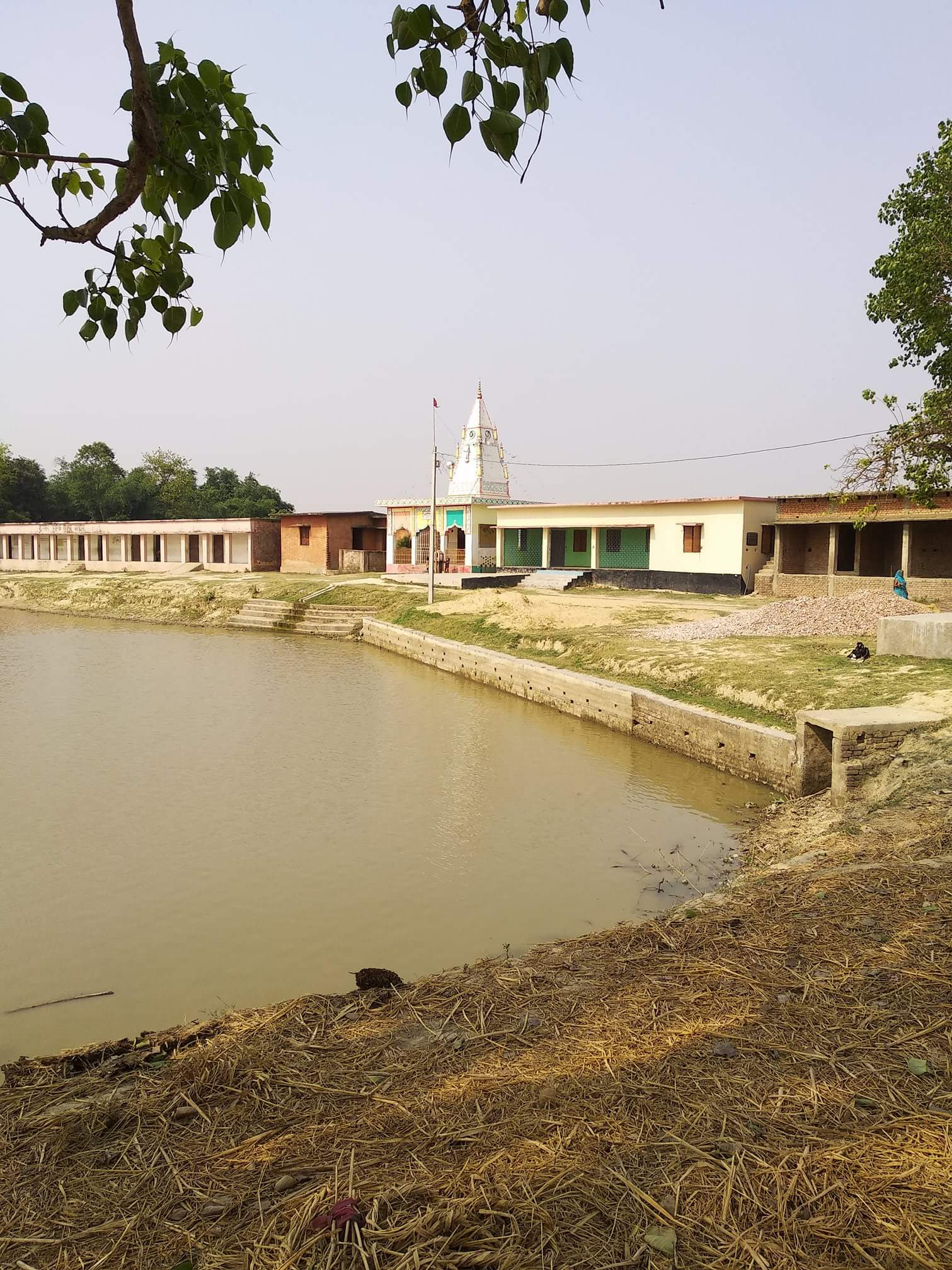
Panchayat BHavan, Jharbaria
