= Lilpur =

- country: India

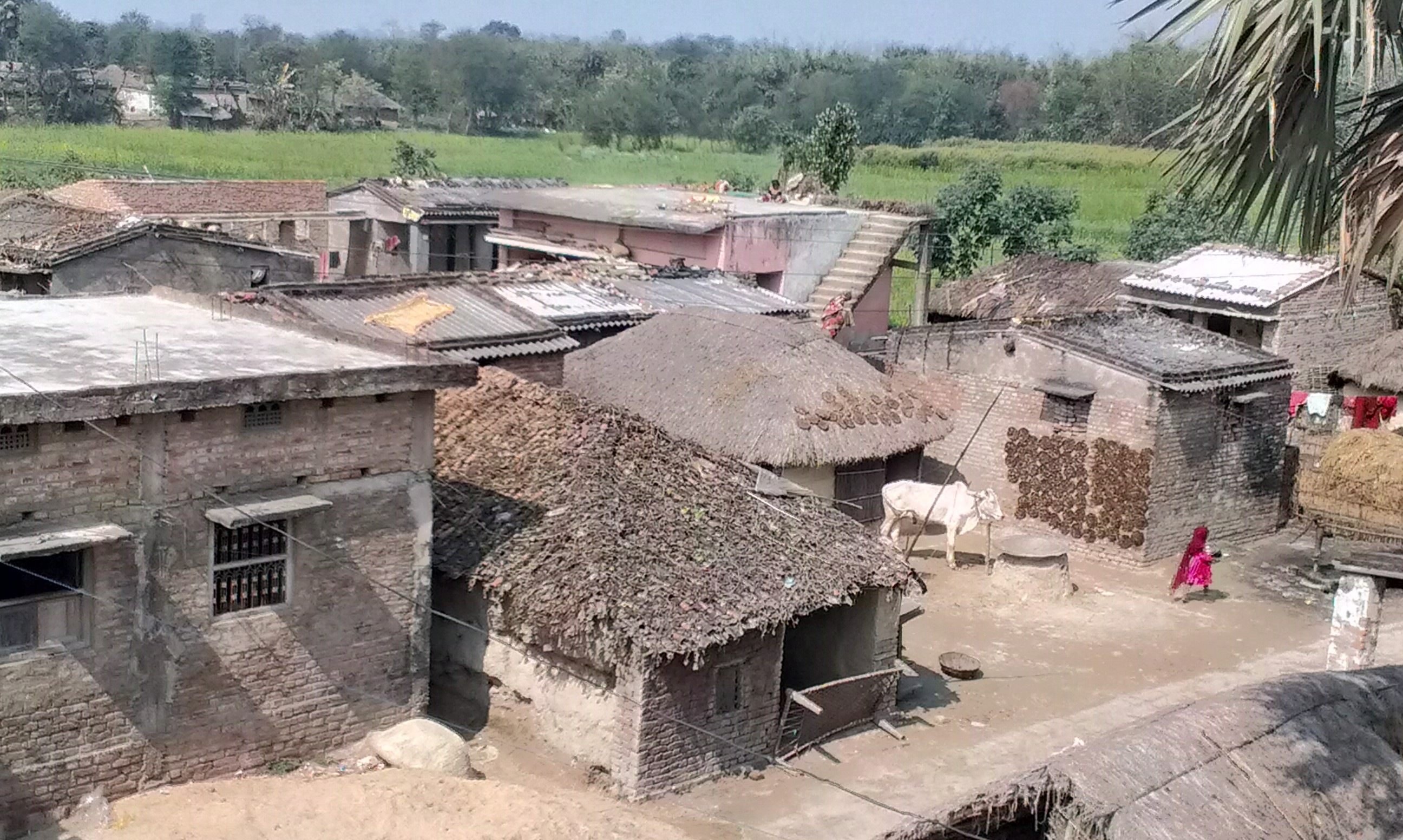
Lilpur village darbhanga

Lilpur is a village situated in Darbhanga district of Bihar where several communities live. Lilpur is an ideal village in Darbhanga, apart from the village having several issues. About 3670 people live in this village.

== History ==
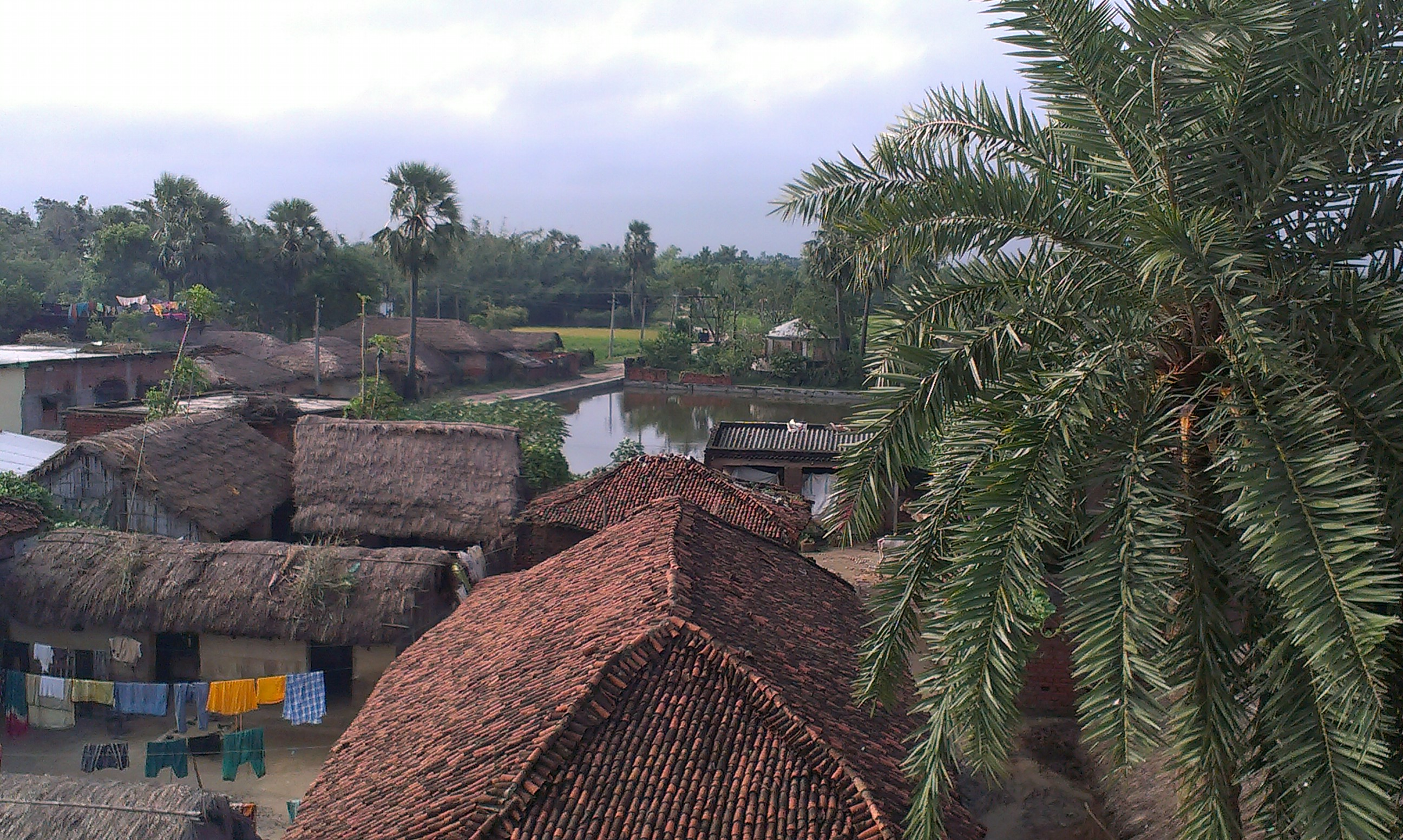
Lilpur

Lilpur history is too old according to research information and village old people knowledge lilpur word come from Assyrian Dictionary which means 'Mahala'- a place with small bushes and water logging area and establishment year is 1854 but according to villagers and our information Lilpur village was established in 1893.

== Economy ==
Most of the villagers are jobless. The village is financially very weak. Some of villagers grow crops in their small piece of land but they cannot depend their lives on those crops. Many of the villagers are in search of employment.

== Resources and Infrastructure ==
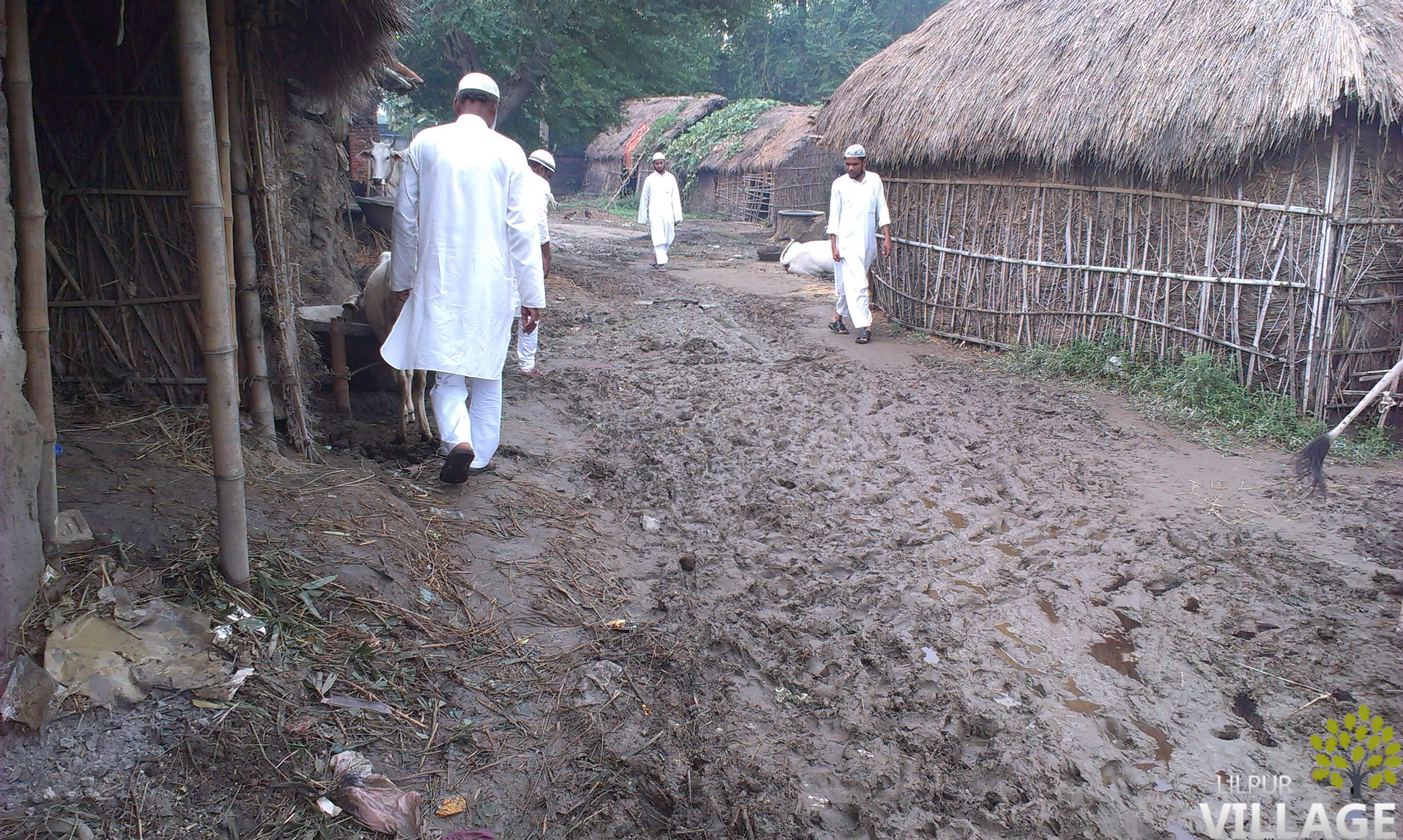
Condition of Lilpur Road

The roads of this village are unmetalled in order that villagers have to face several difficulties. 65% of people live in mudbuilt houses in this village. There is very little help from the government for the sake of this village. This village has neither a single doctor nor medical store so if any person of this village falls ill then he has to travel long distance away from village of Darbhanga. 55% of the villagers go to nature's call outside of village in an open field.

== Education ==
71% of villagers are uneducated because there is not a good school and they do not have enough money. The education level of this village is very pitiable so the children of the village have been becoming uneducated because their parents have not a source of income so that the children could be sent to the city to receive an education.

MP	MLA
Darbhanga Lok Sabha constituency	Vidhan sabha Alinagar Darbhanga. Bihar
KRITI AZAD	Abdul Bari Siddiqui
