= Vijay Kumar Mishra =

Indian politician

Member of Bihar Legislative Council
- In office 24 May 2014 – 24 May 2020
- Constituency: Nominated by the Governor

Member of Bihar Legislative Assembly
- In office 2010–2014
- Preceded by: Ram Niwas Prasad
- Succeeded by: Rishi Mishra
- Constituency: Jale
- In office 2000–2005
- Preceded by: Abdul Salam
- Succeeded by: Ram Niwas Prasad
- Constituency: Jale
- In office 1990–1995
- Preceded by: Lokesh Nath Jha
- Succeeded by: Abdul Salam
- Constituency: Jale

Member of Parliament, Lok Sabha
- In office 1984–1989
- Preceded by: Hari Nath Mishra
- Succeeded by: Shakeelur Rehman
- Constituency: Darbhanga

Personal details
- Born: 16 January 1946 (age 80) Saharsa district, Bihar Province
- Party: Janata Dal (United)
- Other political affiliations: Bharatiya Janata Party (till 2014); Indian National Congress; Janata Party (till 1989)
- Spouse: Meena Mishra (m. 1971)
- Children: 3 sons, 1 daughter
- Parent: Lalit Narayan Mishra (father)
- Education: Bachelor of Arts
- Alma mater: Bihar University
- Profession: Agriculturist

Vijay Kumar Mishra is an Indian politician from the state of Bihar who was the Member of Bihar Legislative Council from 2014 to 2020.

He is the eldest son of former Railway Minister of India, Lalit Narayan Mishra, and the nephew of the former Chief Minister of Bihar, Jagannath Mishra.

Mishra had represented Jale Assembly constituency in the Bihar Legislative Assembly, being first elected for a five-year term in 1990, then again in 2000 and for the years 2010–2014. He had also represented Darbhanga as a Member of Parliament in the 8th Lok Sabha (1984–1989) after defeating Pandit Harinath Mishra, former Speaker of the Bihar Legislative Assembly.

Mishra has been Vice President of the Bharatiya Janata Party, and chairman of the government machinery committee in the Bihar Legislative Assembly.

He is married to Meena Mishra and has three sons and a daughter. His second son, Rishi Mishra, has also been a Member of the Legislative Assembly for the Jale constituency.
