= Ramouli, Benipur =

Village in India

Ramouli is a village in Benipur Block in Darbhanga Division, Darbhanga District of Bihar State, India.
