= Sundarpur, Khurda =

Sundarpur Sundar pur
- village
- Location in Orissa, India
- Coordinates: 19.928°N 85.443°E
- Country: India
- State: Odisha
- District: Khordha

Population
  - Estimate (2012): 15,000

Languages
  - Official: Oriya
- Time zone: UTC+5:30 (IST)
- PIN: 752021
- Vehicle registration: OR-
- Nearest city: Khordha/Bhubaneshwar
- Lok Sabha constituency: Bhubaneshwar

Sundarpur is a village in Tangi Block of Khordha district, Orissa, India.

- Population: More than 15000, Voter list 2012 = 9,847.
- Occupation: Most of the people depend upon farming, rice production and vegetable production, according to the season
- Temples: Baba Mukteswar Temple, Maa Budhi Tara Temple, Balunkeswar Temple, Maa sutakhai Temple, maa mangala temple tulasipurpatana, hanuman temple.
- Railway Station: Mukteswar Puri P.H. sundarpur
- Nearest National Highway : NH 5 at Tangi
- Nearest Hospital : Tangi Govt Hospital
- Nearest Village: Sundarpur, Bhajagarh, Mangala Jodi, Udaya Giri, Sundarpur Colony, Kathuliagoth colony
- Market : Chandapur and Tangi two big markets on NH 5
- Lake: Chilika Lake sundarpur birds park odisha wildlife
- Ponds: Jagadala Pokhari, udaygiri pokhari near hanuman temple, Badhi Pokhari, Jhara Pokhari

Education:

- Sundarpur U.P School
- Nuapada U.P. School
- Mukteswar Dev M.E. School
- Saraswati Sisu Mandir
- Padma Kumud Bidya Niketan (High School), Sundarpur

Sundarpur Gram Panchayat. It has 22 Wards from (Udayagiri-3, Sundarpur-4, Sundarpur Colony-3, Mangalajori-9, Bhajagarh-3) Current Sarapanch: Mamata Pradhan (udaygiri) from 17 February 2017 onwards. Mr Gajendra (President) Sundar Pur Village.
