= Chhatwan =

- Village
- Location in Bihar, India Chhatwan (India)
- Country: India
- State: Bihar
- Region: Mithila
- District: Darbhanga
- Founder: Zamiruddin Sardar

Government
  - Type: Panchayati raj (India)
  - Body: Gram panchayat
  - Students leader: Md Inzamam, Md Asjadullah
  - Mukhiya: Faiz Mohammad

Area
  - Total: 3.14 km^{2} (1.21 sq mi)
- Elevation: 55 m (180 ft)

Population (2011)
  - Total: 11,054
  - Density: 3,520/km^{2} (9,120/sq mi)

Languages
  - Official: Hindi
  - Additional official: Urdu
  - Recognised Regional: Maithili, English
- Time zone: UTC+5:30 (IST)
- PIN Code: 847337
- Telephone Code: 06272
- ISO 3166 code: IN-BR
- Vehicle registration: BR-07
- Nearest city: Darbhanga, Madhubani
- Lok Sabha constituency: Madhubani
- Vidhan Sabha constituency: Keoti
- Sex ratio: 926 ♂/♀
- Literacy: 55.77%

Chhatwan is a village in Keotiranway Tehsil, Darbhanga District, Bihar, India.

Chhatwan has its panchayat which is registered as the name of Gram Panchayat Raj Chhatwan. Chhatwan Panchayat is divided into 14 wards.

== History ==
Chhatwan was established during the time of Akbar by Zamiruddin Sardar, son of Manour Ali ancient Zamindar of this village. The name of the village was inspired by the Alstonia scholars (Chhatwan) of the terrace. There was a garden of Alstonia scholaris tree, one of the Translators in Akabari Darbar. After the establishment of New Raj Darbhanga, several expansions took place to develop the taxation system in the Mithila (region). Raj Darbhanga had 4,495 villages in 18 circles in Bihar and Bengal and employed over 7,500 officers to manage the estate at that time.

According to an article in the Dainik Jagran, Mahatma Gandhi came after a gruesome crisis in 1934. He was accompanied by Pandit Jawaharlal Nehru, Jamnalal Bajaj, Dr. Rajendra Prasad, J. B. Kripalani, etc. They were dismayed by the devastation caused by the earthquake, however, the people of Mithilanchal refused to accept the relief given by the British government and the Congress. He told the people that it is not a crime to seek help in times of calamity. The earthquake victims started the relay on their call. They went to the Chhatwan village in Keoti Block to know the misery of earthquake victims. There was a meeting with the Chhatwan villager at Devi Lal Pokhar, which is today known as Gandhi Chowk Chhatwan.

== Geography ==
Chhatwan is a large village located in Keotiranway, Darbhanga district, Bihar. Nearby towns and villages include Loam (3.2 km), Raiyam Factory (5 km), Muria (5.4 km) and Keoti (7.8 km), Darbhanga (16 km), Madhubani (13 km) and Pandaul (9.8 km). The Madhubani Road crosses through the village, which is also near National Highway 27 (5.9 km), a main east–west corridor. The Nearest Railway Station is Tarsrai Station; 6.4 km away.

== Demographics ==
As of 2011, per the Population Census, Chhatwan was home to resident 2,339 families, with a total population of 11,054.

Sex Ratio

- Males = 51.92%
- Females = 48.08%

Chhatwan has its Panchayat. Chhatwan village has a lower literacy rate compared to Bihar as a whole. In 2011, the literacy rate of Chhatwan village was 55.77% compared to 61.80% for all Bihar. Male literacy in Chhatwan stands at 63.77%, while the female literacy rate was 47.05%.

Population growth
Year	Pop.	±%
1991	6,889	—
2001	10,005	+45.2%
2011	11,054	+10.5%

== Economy ==
Agriculture is the main industry of the village, though development has not been significant. The Jeewach river, flowing through the east of Chhatwan, provides a fertile flood plain that serves as the basis for growing local crops. Mango fruits are grown in abundance, and sugarcane is produced before shipping to the Raiyam sugar factory for processing. It is also well known for its many markets as well as Chhatwan Bazaar and small businesses, which include cloth shops, jewelry, general stores, hardware stores, and bike showrooms. The main market of Chhatwan is the Gandhi Chowk, Azad Chowk, Chandni Chowk, A.P.J. Abdul Kalam Chowk, Kunwar Chowk & Maulana Mazharul Haque Chowk on the Madhubani Road.

== Culture ==
Chhatwan is a multi-cultural society. Among the Muslim festivals celebrated are Eid al-Fitr (Eid), Eid al-Adha (Bakraeid) and Muharram. Hindu festivals celebrated include Chhath, five days after Deepawali, Makar Sankranti, Durga Puja, and Diwali

== Education ==
There are many resources of education in Chhatwan, Islamic as well as modern education. For modern education many governments and private schools are also there.

- Prathmik School Chhatwan Harijan
- Rajkiya Utkramit Uchcha School Chhatwan Basic
- Prathmik School Chhatwan Urdu
- Rajkiya Utkramit Madhya School Dhanushi
- Prathmik School Patharpatti
- Project Prathmik School Fakir Takiya Chhatwan
- Red Rose Public School Chhatwan

For Islamic education, there are two madrasas, both of which are government-recognised.

- Madarsa Tul Banat Chhatwan
- Madarsa Noorul Islam Chhatwan

== Hospital ==
- Additional Primary Health Center Chhatwan
- Veterinary Hospital Chhatwan

== Transportation ==
=== Roadways ===
Chhatwan is well connected with another part of village and cities, Tarsarai - Raiyam Road via Chhatwan passes through the village which is connected to National Highway 27 and Tarsarai Station North End, and the South end is connected to Madhubani District, Chhatwan - Hajipur Road Connected to the National Highway 527B West End and East End connected to Chhatwan - Pandaul Chhatwan has auto-rickshaw services to nearby village and cities, and bus services to Darbhanga - Madhubani, via Raiyam sugar factory, Chhatwan - Darbhanga, via Khirma.

=== Railways ===
The nearest railway station is Tarsrai Railway Station (TRS). People who wish to visit Delhi can take a direct train from the Tarsarai railway station. Two express train stops Here :

- Sarayu Yamuna Express to Amritsar
- Shaheed Express to Amritsar

Many more passengers train stop here.

=== Airways ===
Darbhanga Airport is the nearest airport to Chhatwan which is at a distance of 17 km from there.

== Climate ==
Chhatwan has a humid subtropical climate (Köppen climate classification Cwa).

Climate data for Chhatwan
Month	Jan	Feb	Mar	Apr	May	Jun	Jul	Aug	Sep	Oct	Nov	Dec	Year
Record high °C (°F)	30.4 (86.7)	33.9 (93.0)	39.9 (103.8)	42.0 (107.6)	41.9 (107.4)	43.4 (110.1)	39.1 (102.4)	38.4 (101.1)	39.6 (103.3)	39.2 (102.6)	33.9 (93.0)	29.9 (85.8)	43.4 (110.1)
Mean daily maximum °C (°F)	22.1 (71.8)	25.8 (78.4)	31.0 (87.8)	34.1 (93.4)	35.0 (95.0)	34.9 (94.8)	32.5 (90.5)	32.8 (91.0)	32.5 (90.5)	31.6 (88.9)	28.0 (82.4)	24.8 (76.6)	30.68 (87.22)
Mean daily minimum °C (°F)	9.2 (48.6)	11.0 (51.8)	15.1 (59.2)	19.1 (66.4)	21.2 (70.2)	22.9 (73.2)	23.8 (74.8)	24.2 (75.6)	23.8 (74.8)	21.2 (70.2)	15.8 (60.4)	10.6 (51.1)	18.18 (64.72)
Record low °C (°F)	−0.2 (31.6)	−0.2 (31.6)	3.9 (39.0)	9.2 (48.6)	10.4 (50.7)	15.9 (60.6)	18.7 (65.7)	19.4 (66.9)	18.9 (66.0)	12.7 (54.9)	7.2 (45.0)	2.4 (36.3)	−0.2 (31.6)
Average precipitation mm (inches)	13.0 (0.51)	14.0 (0.55)	9.0 (0.35)	29.0 (1.14)	76.0 (2.99)	139.0 (5.47)	353.0 (13.90)	254.0 (10.00)	193.0 (7.60)	73.0 (2.87)	6.0 (0.24)	7.0 (0.28)	1,166 (45.9)
Average rainy days	1.6	1.7	1.6	2.6	4.6	7.6	16.4	12.2	10.5	3.4	0.5	1.0	63.7
Average relative humidity (%)	68	63	49	56	60	70	78	79	79	73	66	67	67
