= Supaul Bazar =

Coordinates: 26°06′29.98″N 86°36′04″E

Supaul Bazar is a town in the Darbhanga subdivision of Darbhanga district in the Indian state of Bihar. It is located approximately 50 kilometres east of Darbhanga.

Supaul Bazar is composed of Ramnagar, Afzala, Khewa, Ziraat, Shaikhpura, Biraul, Haat Gaachhi, and Tolwa. The population at the 2001 census was 75,871. Ghoghsar, Hanuman, Nagar, Baink are nearby prominent villages.

== Facilities ==
The town has two cinemas, Prasad Chitralya and Pouddar Chitralya. A railway station Biraul Station (near Baliya Village) connects to Sakri and Darbhanga junction.

== Education ==
There are several schools in Supaul Bazar. The Govt. Onkar High School, which is providing secondary education in the area since 1939. A Govt. Degree college named Janta Koshi College is located at nearby Biraul.

Apart from this Universal public school and Saraswati shishu mandir are also prominent private schools in Supaul Bazar. The place is very close to famous Shiva temple Kusheshwarsthan.

The Al-Mahad-Ul Islami Islamia School was founded by the late Dr. Lutfullah Sahab.
