= Amaithi =

- Village
- Location in Bihar, India Amaithi (India)
- Coordinates: 26°08′10″N 86°04′59″E
- Country: India
- State: Bihar
- District: Darbhanga

Languages
  - Official: Maithili, Hindi
- Time zone: UTC+5:30 (IST)
- ISO 3166 code: IN-BR

Amaithi is a village in the Benipur block of Darbhanga district in the state of Bihar, India.
