= Pandaul Assembly constituency =

Coordinates: 26°14′55″N 86°05′57″E

Pandaul
- Former constituency for the Bihar Legislative Assembly

Constituency details
- Country: India
- Region: East India
- State: Bihar
- District: Madhubani
- Lok Sabha constituency: Jhanjharpur
- Established: 1977
- Abolished: 2010

Pandaul was a assembly constituency in Madhubani district in the Indian state of Bihar. It was reserved for scheduled castes. The constituency was a part of Jhanjharpur Lok Sabha constituency.

== Members of Vidhan Sabha ==
Year	Member	Party
1952-77: Constituency did not exist
1977	Siya Ram Yadav	Janata Party
1980	Kumud Ranjan Jha	Indian National Congress (I)
1985	Kumud Ranjan Jha	Indian National Congress
1990	Kumud Ranjan Jha	Indian National Congress
1995	Naiyar Azam	Janata Dal
2000	Naiyar Azam	Rashtriya Janata Dal
2005	Naiyar Azam	Rashtriya Janata Dal
2005	Vinod Narayan Jha	Bharatiya Janata Party
2010 onwards: Constituency does not exist
