= Mohanpur, Darbhanga =

Coordinates: 26.172545°N 85.931229°E

Sara Mohanpur Sara Muhammad
- Village
- Saramohammad
- Interactive map of Sara Mohanpur
- Country: India
- State: Bihar
- Region: Mithila

Government
  - Type: Panchayat level

Languages
  - Official: Maithili, Hindi
- Time zone: UTC+5:30 (IST)
- ISO 3166 code: IN-BR

Sara Mohanpur (Sara Mohammad) is a village in Darbhanga District of Bihar, located 4 km from the Darbhanga Railway Station and 9 km from the Darbhanga Airport. It is directly connected with the main city. Peoples are very sincere about their village maintenance; they always participate in panchayat elections to work for the growth of village.

Sara Mohanpur is also famous for the palatial Mohanpur House and the garden/orchard surrounding it. Mohanpur House belonged to the (Late) Mukund Jha, who donated it in 1972 to the Government of Bihar for establishing an Ayurvedic College.

Initially, the Mohanpur House served as the head office of the L N Mithila University from 1972 to 1975. Thereafter Maharani "Rameshwari Bhartiya Chikitsa Vigyan Sansthan" was established and functions at this house. It was named after the wife of Maharaja Rameshwar Singh, the penultimate Maharaja of Darbhanga.

This institute is affiliated with Kameshwar Singh Darbhanga Sanskrit University and offers the BAMS degree.
