= Tariyani =

- village
- Location in Bihar, India Tariyani (India)
- Coordinates: 26.377796°N 85.819560°E
- Country: India
- State: Bihar
- District: Darbhanga
- Region: Mithila

Population (2013)
  - Total: 1,000

Languages
  - Official: Maithili, Hindi urdu
- Time zone: UTC+5:30 (IST)
- PIN: 847304
- Telephone code: 06272 _ _ _
- Literacy: More than 90%
- Lok Sabha: Madhubani
- Vidhan Sabha: Jale

Tariyani is an Indian village near Kamtaul (35 km north of Darbhanga on SH-75) in Darbhanga district of Bihar state. Other major villages nearby are Massa, Muraitha, Basaith, and Rajaun.

It is under Karwa-Tariyani Panchayat of Jale Block under Darbhanga district. It has a middle school, Panchayat Bhavan, Barka Pokhar, and Barely Bazar (bi-weekly Haat on Sunday and Thursday). Jale being the bordering block of Sitamarhi, Madhubani, and Muzaffarpur, Tariyani is easily accessible from these towns as well.

Though the literacy rate is high, till recently, the prime source of living was farming. Mango orchards are also commonly seen here.

A new Panchayat Sarkar Bhavan is functional since 2020. It also host a unit of Darbhanga Police apart from regular Panchayat activities. A Police Chauki, Library and Bank are going to be operational in near future by 2025.

A new Hospital (Prathmik Upchar Kendra) is also functional though irregular in services.

Tariyani, the village of Landlords, has considerable socio-political influence in the region.

== Transport ==
Connectivity to these areas in general and of Tariyani, in particular, has experienced an improvement in recent years after the construction of roads SH-75 and SH-52.

Tariyani is well connected by road through SH-75 (DKBM Road) and SH-52 (Pupri-Benipatti). The nearest railway station is Muraitha and Kamtaul.

Darbhanga Airport is within an hour's drive from here.
