= Horalpatti =

Village in Hayaghat, India

Horalpatti is a village in Hayaghat block in Darbhanga district of Bihar, India. Horalpatti is located 6 kilometres from Laheriasarai and ten kilometers away from Darbhanga. The village is mainly famous for Baba Janeswarnath Mahadev Mandir and Gangasagar Pokhar which was created by Darbhanga Maharaja in 1928. The total population of the village is around 3,000. The literacy rate of Horalpatti is 63.72%. The pincode of Horalpatti is 847101.
