= Constituent =

Constituent or constituency may refer to:

== Politics ==
- Constituency, an electoral district or constituency
- Constituent, an individual voter represented by a elected official within an electoral district, organization, etc.
- Constituent state (territory, country, etc.): an administrative division of a larger state
- Constituent assembly, a body assembled for the purpose of drafting or revising a constitution

== Other uses ==
- Constituent (linguistics), a word or a group of words that function as a single unit within a hierarchical structure
- Constituent quark, a current quark with a notional "covering"

== See also ==
- Ingredient
- Part (disambiguation)
