= Baheri, Bihar =

Baheri
- Village
- Location in Bihar, India Baheri (India)
- Coordinates: 26°5′0″N 86°9′0″E
- Country: India
- State: Bihar
- Region: Mithila
- District: Darbhanga

Government
  - Body: Bihar state gov.

Languages
  - Official: Maithili, Hindi
- Time zone: UTC+5:30 (IST)
- Coastline: 0 kilometres (0 mi)
- Nearest city: mosta o boughalem
- Lok Sabha constituency: mosta
- Civic agency: esbp

Baheri is a town in the Darbhanga district, in the state of Bihar, India.

== See also ==
- Railway stations in India
- Antaur
