= Gâlma River =

Gâlma River may refer to:

- Gâlma, a tributary of the Ialomicioara in Dâmbovița County
- Gâlma, a tributary of the Ialomița in Dâmbovița County
