= Gəlmə =

- Municipality
- Location within Azerbaijan
- Coordinates: 40°13′02″N 47°41′17″E
- Country: Azerbaijan
- Rayon: Zardab

Population
  - Total: 2,142
- Time zone: UTC+4 (AZT)
  - Summer (DST): UTC+5 (AZT)

Gəlmə is a village and municipality in the Zardab Rayon of Azerbaijan. It has a population of 2,142.
