= Sundarpur, Darbhanga, Bihar =

Sundarpur is a village in Darbhanga district in the Darbhanga urban constituency of Bihar, India.

In the time of Maharaj Kameshwar Singh (a King of Darbhanga Estate), he used to go hunting here with his wives and army. Once, during a normal visit his wife wanted to have a bath in the middle of the journey. On her request, the Maharaja ordered the making of a new Ghat (place to have bath in a pond) at the bank of a nearby pond. From that day the pond has been known as Maharani Pokhar and the village which is situated near to the pond is known as Sundarpur.

== Population ==
Sundarpur is a small village with a population of 879, as of 2012.

== Education ==
Rajkiye Prathmik Vidyalay is a school in the village.

== Transport ==
Recently, Sundarpur was developed with roads and electricity. The first flyover to be built in the Darbhanga district was built here. The Indian Air Force's Airbase near the village was built during the Sino-Indian war. It houses fighters and other combat aircraft.
