= Alinagar Assembly constituency =

Coordinates: 26°03′46″N 86°15′12″E

Alinagar
- Constituency No. 81 for the Bihar Legislative Assembly

Constituency details
- Country: India
- Region: East India
- State: Bihar
- District: Darbhanga
- Lok Sabha constituency: Darbhanga
- Established: 2008
- Total electors: 285,708
- Reservation: None

Member of Legislative Assembly
- 18th Bihar Legislative Assembly
- Incumbent Maithili Thakur
- Party: BJP
- Alliance: NDA
- Elected year: 2025
- Preceded by: Mishri Lal Yadav

Alinagar is an assembly constituency in Darbhanga district in the Indian state of Bihar.

== Overview ==
As per Delimitation of Parliamentary and Assembly constituencies Order, 2008, No. 81 Alinagar Assembly constituency is composed of the following: Alinagar, Tardih, Motipur Panchayat "Earlier Antour Panchayat (Antour, Motipur, Andauli) and Ghanshyampur community development blocks. Alinagar assembly is dominated by Brahmin, Yadav and Muslim voters. They play vital role in elections.

Alinagar Assembly constituency is part of No. 14 Darbhanga (Lok Sabha constituency).

== History of Alinagar block ==
Earlier Alinagar was under Benipur block, since administrative block was far from public reach and due to limited availability of transportation for the people of the village in Alinagar, it was difficult for the public to access the administrative block easily. Then there was a formation of Alinagar block which is under Benipur division. Then have crafted new panchayat and dissolved some of the old panchayat and village under new block.

New panchayat and village are - Alinagar, Tardih, Motipur Panchayat "Earlier Antour Panchayat (Antour, Motipur, Andauli) and Ghanshyampur

While forming Alinagar block, they have dissolved Antour panchayat which was having [Antour], Motipur, Balha and Nandapati village in it. Now Antour is part of Motipur panchayat which is new and came into force after dissolving Antour panchayat. Balha and Nandapati is part of Benipur division.

After formation of new block Alinagar, it becomes difficult for people in the village Antour to access the Administrative block in Alinagar since it is in the neighbourhood of Benipur division. And the nearest railway station is Benipur which is .3 km from Antour village and administrative blocks of Benipur are 2 km from village Antour and new administrative block for Antour which is Alinagar is 10 km from village Antour in the opposite direction of the main market which is in Benipur.

== Members of Legislative Assembly ==
Year	Name	Party
Until 2008: Constituency did not exist
2010	Abdul Bari Siddiqui	Rashtriya Janata Dal
2015	Abdul Bari Siddiqui	Rashtriya Janata Dal
2020	Mishri Lal Yadav	Bharatiya Janata Party
2025	Maithili Thakur	Bharatiya Janata Party

== Election results ==
=== 2025 ===
Bihar Assembly election, 2025: Alinagar
Party	Candidate	Votes	%	±%
BJP	Maithili Thakur	84,915	49.05	
RJD	Binod Mishra	73,185	42.27	▲5.61
Independent	Saifuddin Ahmed	2,803	1.62	
JSP	Biplaw Kumar Chaudhary	2,275	1.31	
NOTA	None of the above	4,751	2.74	▲0.88
Majority		11,730	6.78	▲4.82
Turnout		173,117	60.59	▲3.19
BJP hold		Swing		

=== 2020 ===
Bihar Assembly election, 2020: Alinagar
Party	Candidate	Votes	%	±%
VIP	Mishri Lal Yadav	61,082	38.62	
RJD	Binod Mishra	57,981	36.66	−11.63
JAP(L)	Sanjay Kumar Singh	9,737	6.16	+4.05
LJP	Raj Kumar Jha	8,850	5.6	
Independent	Fakira Paswan	4,468	2.83	
Independent	Md Naseem Azam Siddiqu	2,413	1.53	
Independent	Shambhu Mishra	2,178	1.38	
Independent	Sulekha Devi	1,938	1.23	
Wazib Adhikar Party	Mohammad Jamir	1,705	1.08	
Samajwadi Janata Dal Democratic	Md Nasar Nabab	1,576	1.0	
NOTA	None of the above	2,941	1.86	−1.48
Majority		3,101	1.96	−7.67
Turnout		158,159	57.4	+1.86
BJP gain from RJD		Swing		

=== 2015 ===
Bihar Assembly election, 2015: Alinagar
Party	Candidate	Votes	%	±%
RJD	Abdul Bari Siddiqui	67,461	48.29	
BJP	Mishri Lal Yadav	54,001	38.66	
Independent	Raj Kumar Jha	4,009	2.87	
JAP(L)	Naseem Azam Siddiqui	2,948	2.11	
BSP	Mahmud Aalam	1,533	1.1	
Independent	Ram Safi	1,353	0.97	
NOTA	None of the above	4,664	3.34	
Majority		13,460	9.63	
Turnout		139,698	55.54	
