= Muria, Bihar =

Coordinates: 26°12′10″N 86°00′30″E

Muria is a village in Darbhanga District of Bihar in India. It is located 12 km from Darbhanga on National Highway 27 (old NH 57). It is 110 km from the state capital, Patna. Its PIN code is 847115.

== Geography ==
The nearby villages are Loam (2.1 km), Adalpur (2.2 km), Kharua (2.9 km), Bijuli (3.2 km), Dularpur (4 km), Chhatwan (5.1 km) and nearest towns are Hayaghat (6.3 km), Darbhanga (11.1 km), Keotiranway (12.3 km) and Manigachhi (14.5 km).

== Transport ==
The nearest railway station is Tarsrai. National Highway 27 passes through the village.
