= Mahuli Nankar =

Mahuli Nankar is a village in the Jale CD Block of Darbhanga district, in Bihar, India.

At the 2011 census the population was 3,149, consisting of 599 families. This consisted of 1,648 males and 1,501 females. The literacy rate was reported as 85.4%
