= Jogiara =

- Village
- Location in Bihar, India Jogiara (India)
- Coordinates: 26°24′30″N 85°45′00″E
- Country: India
- State: Bihar
- Region: Mithila
- District: Darbhanga

Official
  - Languages: Maithili, Hindi, English
- Time zone: IST
- ISO 3166 code: IN-BR

Jogiara is a village in Darbhanga district in the Indian state of Bihar. The village is also served by India Post. Its Postal Code is 847303.

== History ==
Jogiara is a place of historical importance. This village is settled by Rathore Rajputs from Jodhpur. The village was never entitled to pay the land revenue due to continuous struggle and fight against the Mughal emperor. The villagers struggled and showed great bravery against the Mughal dynasty. Mithila Maharaja Sir Kameshwar Singh (a Brahmin ruler of Darbhanga), also known as Darbhanga Maharaja, never levied any land tax on this village. Jogiara village also participated hugely against the British rule.

Thakur Jogi Singh, a Rathore Rajput descendent from the royal family of Jodhpur Rajasthan came and settled here in the 17th Century. The village of Jogiara is named after him. Jogiara is a base of royal families and culture. The oldest Zamindari status holding house is Haweli Deudhi of Jogiara. This Palace called Deudhi was made by Babu Gopal Singh, a Zamindar. The next haweli is called the Darbaar of Babu Narayan Prasad Singh.

One of the sons of Thakur Jogi Singh, Kunwar Veer Singh (Bir Singh) settled near the Ganga river with his followers. The village is named after him as Birpur in Raghopur, Vaishali district.

== Demographics ==
As of 2011 Indian Census, Jogiara had a total population of 6,717, of which 3,456 were males and 3,261 were females.

== Transport ==
=== Railways ===
Jogiara village has a railway station named Jogiara and is a part of East Central Railway, Samastipur railway division. It is connected from two major stations Darbhanga and Sitamarhi. The adjacent stations are Dewra – Bandhauli (towards Darbhanga) and Chanduana halt (towards Sitamarhi). A much-awaited stretch of 68 km of broad gauge from Darbhanga- Sitamarhi was completed in the year 2008. Earlier there was meter gauge line in this route. Currently, 12 trains halt at Jogiara railway station. Jogiara is directly connected to Kolkata by Mithlanchal express and is connected with several major cities of India via Darbhanga.

=== Roads ===
Jogiara is also well connected by road. It can be reached by following, Jale-Atarwel Road, Pupri-Madhubani State Highway (SH52), and is also connected to Darbhanga via Garri, Kamtaul-Darbhanga Highway (SH57). It is 38 km from Darbhanga and takes around 1 hour to reach via Kamtaul Highway.

=== Air ===
Jogiara village does not have an air transport service. The current nearest air transport facility is available at Darbhanga Airport which is around 41 km by road from Jogiara.
