= Bahera Assembly constituency =

Coordinates: 26°08′47″N 86°12′27″E

Bahera
- Former constituency for the Bihar Legislative Assembly

Constituency details
- Country: India
- Region: East India
- State: Bihar
- District: Darbhanga
- Lok Sabha constituency: Darbhanga
- Established: 1977
- Abolished: 2010

Bahera Assembly constituency was an assembly constituency in Darbhanga district in the Indian state of Bihar.

As a consequence of the orders of the Delimitation Commission of India, Bahera Assembly constituency ceased to exist in 2010.

It was part of Darbhanga Lok Sabha constituency.

== Results ==
=== 1977-2005 ===
In October 2005, February 2005, and 2000 state assembly elections, Abdul Bari Siddiqui of RJD won the Bahera assembly seat defeating his nearest rivals Ram Narayan Thakur, Mahendra Jha Azad and Harish Chandra Jha, all of BJP, respectively. Contests in most years were multi cornered but only winners and runners are being mentioned. Abdul Bari Siddiqui representing JD defeated Harish Chandra Jha of BJP in 1995. Mahendra Jha Azad of Congress/ Independent defeated Abdul Bari Siddiqui of JD/ LD in 1990 and 1985. Paramanand Jha of Congress defeated Abdul Bari Siddiqui of Janata Party (Secular – Charan Singh) in 1980. Abdul Bari Siddiqui of JP defeated Harinath Mishra of Congress in 1977.
