= Antaur =

Coordinates: 26°04′N 86°10′E

Antour Sahdulapur Antour
- Village
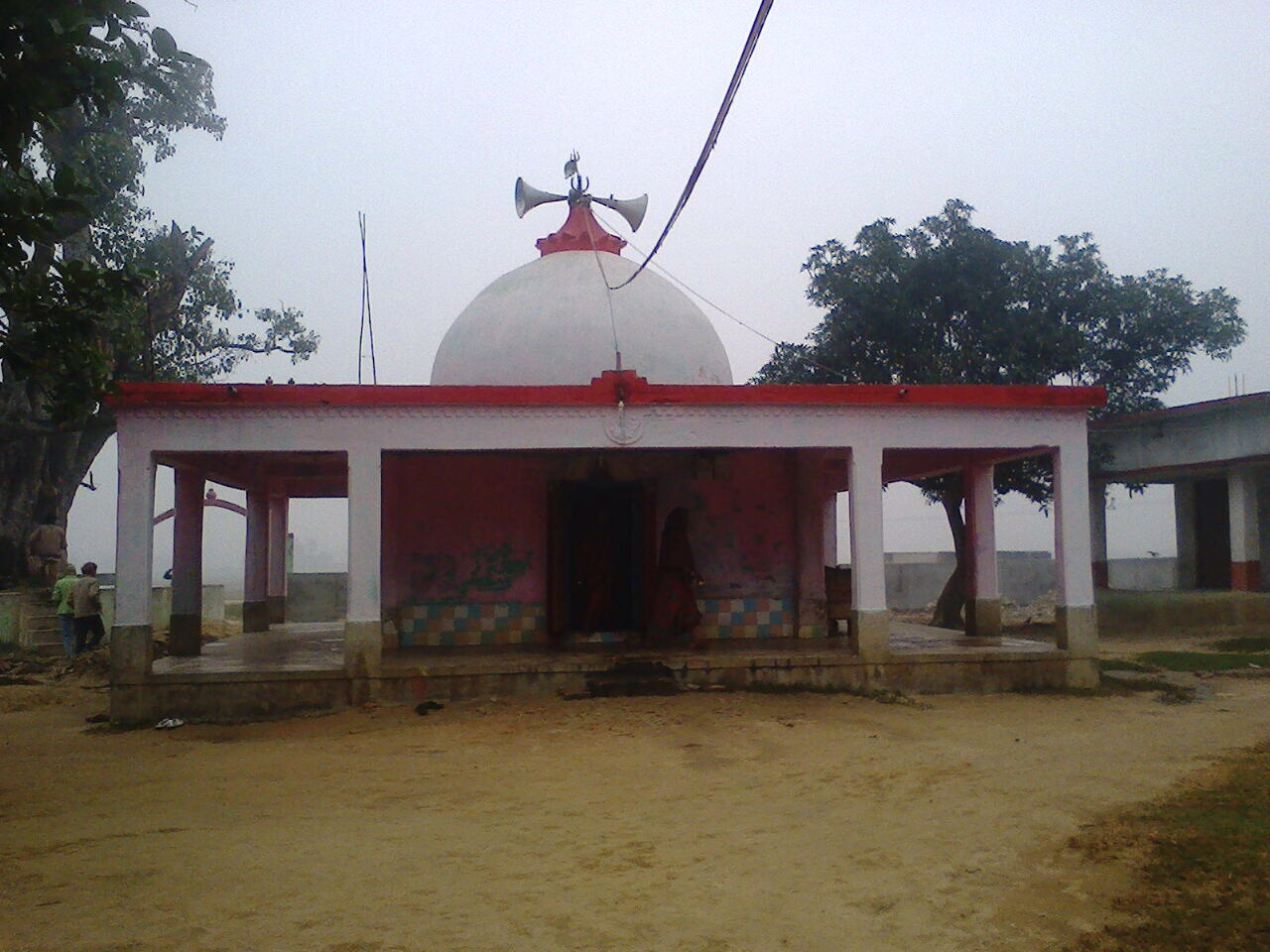
- Interactive map of Antour
- Country: India
- State: Bihar
- Region: Mithila
- District: Darbhanga

Government
  - Body: Benipur Subdivision, Alinagar Block, Darbhanga
- Elevation: 80 m (260 ft)

Languages
  - Official: Maithili
  - Other Languages: Hindi, English
- Time zone: UTC+5:30 (IST)
- PIN: 847103
- Telephone code: 06242
- ISO 3166 code: IN-BR

Antour is a village in Alinagar Block of the Benipur Subdivision under Darbhanga district in Bihar state, in northeastern India. It is located 28 km east from district headquarters of Darbhanga and 138 km from the state capital Patna.

Nearby cities include Jhanjharpur, Darbhanga, Madhubani, Samastipur, Muzaffarpur, and Rosera. Antour is surrounded by Benipur Block to the west, Alinagar Block to the east, Tardih Block to the north, and Ghanshyampur Block to the east.
