= Biraul, Bihar =

Subdivision in Bihar, India

Biraul is the subdivision, of Darbhanga District. It consists of six blocks of Darbhanga district in Bihar, India. The blocks are Biraul, Ghanshyampur, Gorabauram, Kiratpur, Kusheshwar Asthan and Kusheshwar Asthan East. This region covers the south-eastern part of Darbhanga district.

The headquarters building is planned to be constructed in the Mauza area of the Uchhati village. A new road is planned to be constructed to link Darbhanga and Saharsa nearby. Biraul is also a railhead. A new rail line (36 km) has been constructed from the Sakri junction to Biraul. The line was inaugurated in 2008. Three passenger trains run on this line every 24 hours.

The constituent college J. K. College Biraul is located here.Dumri Biraul also has two petrol pump stations, an agricultural farm of the state government, a veterinary hospital, a high school (Onkar High English School, Supaul Bazar) and an old middle school, and a government hospital.

There are 26 village panchayats in Biraul block. The suburban villages are Dumri, Uchhati, Hati, Akbarpur Benk, Balia, Karkauli, Bangarahatta, and Hanuman Nagar.

A new road is planned to be constructed from Hatikothi to Gandaul (13 km). The Bihar Chief Minister Nitish Kumar has inaugurated this road and a bridge on the Kamala river at Kothram recently. This road is planned to be a part of Darbhanga-Saharsa road. After completion of this road the distance between Biraul and Saharsa will be only 40 km (compared with the present distance of over 100 km). The distance between Darbhanga and Saharsa will also be reduced to 86 km. The State Highway 56 of Bihar passes through Biraul, connecting Darbhanga and Kusheshwasthan.
