= Ghanshyampur Assembly constituency =

Coordinates: 26°03′50″N 86°19′05″E

Ghanshyampur
- Former constituency for the Bihar Legislative Assembly

Constituency details
- Country: India
- Region: East India
- State: Bihar
- District: Darbhanga
- Lok Sabha constituency: Rosera
- Established: 1977
- Abolished: 2010

Ghanshyampur Assembly constituency was an assembly constituency in Darbhanga district in the Indian state of Bihar.

As a consequence of the orders of the Delimitation Commission of India, Ghanshyampur Assembly constituency ceased to exist in 2010.

It was part of Darbhanga. Nearest Village Mahathwar

(Lok Sabha constituency).

== Results ==
=== 1977-2005 ===
In the October 2005 state assembly elections, Izhar Ahmad of LJP won the Ghanshyampur assembly seat defeating his nearest rival Dr. Mahabir Prasad of RJD. Contests in most years were multi cornered but only winners and runners are being mentioned. Dr. Mahabir Prasad of RJD defeated Izhar Ahmed of LJP/ JD(U) in February 2005 and 2000. Mahabir Prasad of JD defeated Chandra Kishore Jha of BJP/ Congress in 1995 and 1990. Mahabir Prasad of LD defeated Harish Chandra Jha of Congress in 1985. Mahendra Narayan Jha of Congress defeated Mahabir Prasad of Janata Party (Secular – Charan Singh) in 1980. Mahabir Prasad of JP defeated Anirudh Jha, Independent, in 1977.
