= 1984 Indian general election in Tamil Nadu =

Indian general election in Tamil Nadu, 1984
- 24 December 1984

39 (of 514) seats in the Lok Sabha
- Registered: 30,958,080
- Turnout: 22,591,943 (72.98%) ▲6.22%
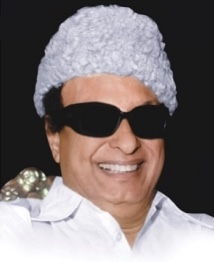

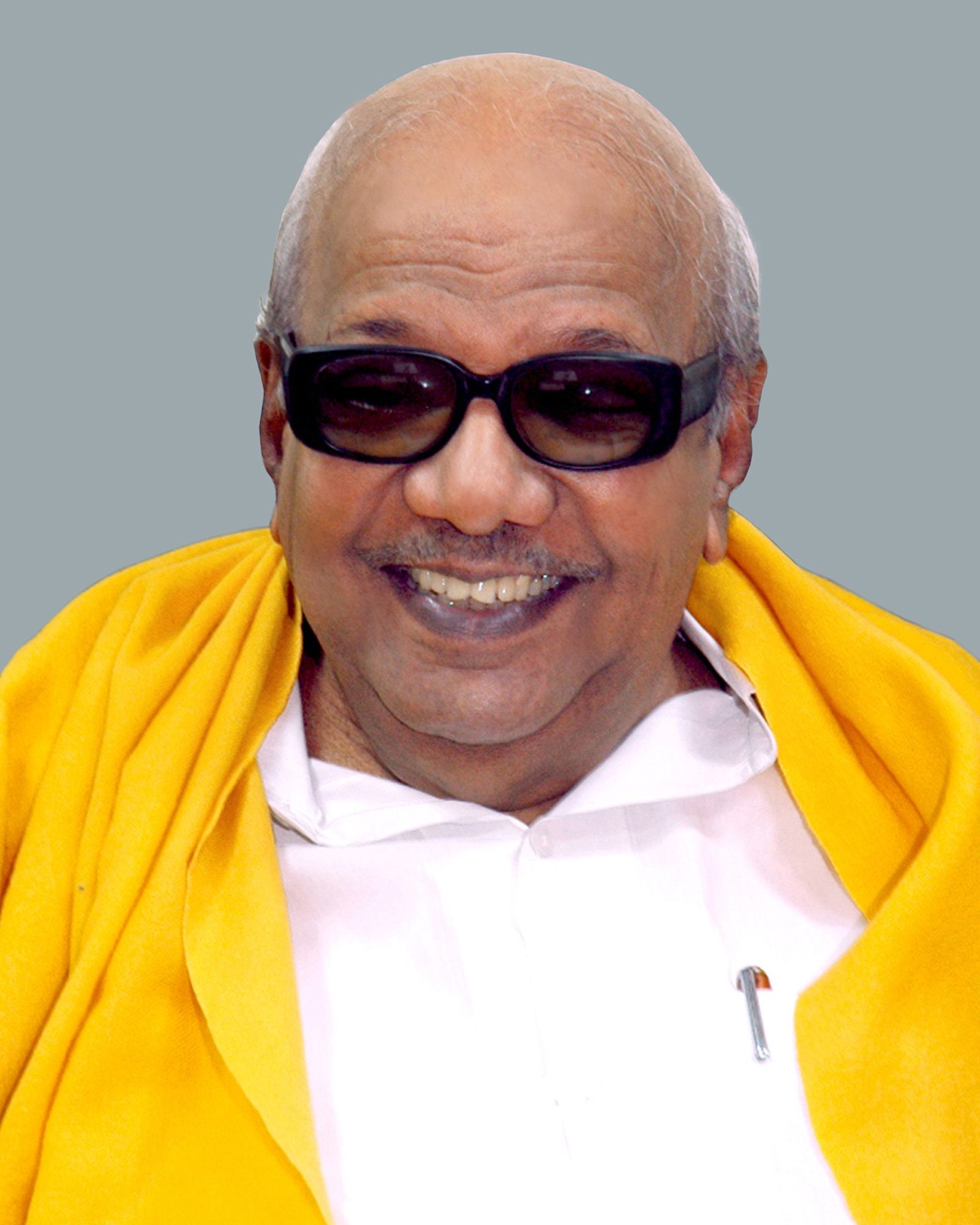
| | First party | Second party |
|---|---|---|
| Leader | M. G. Ramachandran | M. Karunanidhi |
| Party | AIADMK | DMK |
| Alliance | INC+ | Janata alliance+LF |
| Leader's seat | Did not contest | Did not contest |
| Seats won | 37 | 2 |
| Seat change | ▲15 | ▼14 |
| Popular vote | 12,941,942 | 8,006,513 |
| Percentage | 59.87% | 37.04% |
| Swing | ▲2.87% | ▼0.73% |
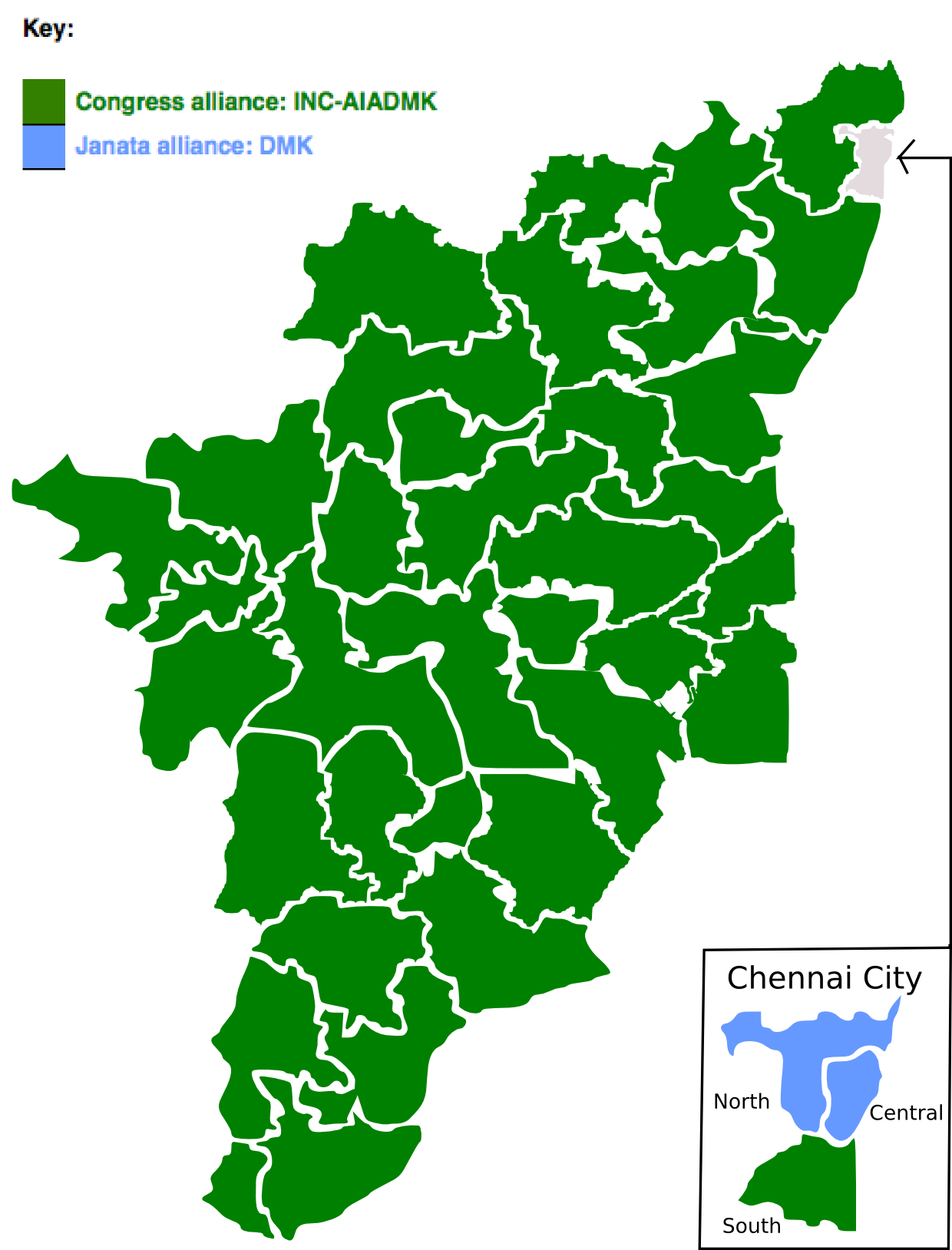
- 1984 Election map (by constituencies); Green = INC+ and Blue = JP+

- Seat wise Result
Prime Minister before election
Rajiv Gandhi
INC(I)
Prime Minister after election
Rajiv Gandhi
INC(I)

The 1984 Indian general elections in Tamil Nadu were held for 39 Lok Sabha seats in the state. The result was a landslide victory for Indian National Congress and its ally All India Anna Dravida Munnetra Kazhagam, winning 37 out of 39 seats. The other 2 seats were won by the opposition, Dravida Munnetra Kazhagam. This marks the start of the dominance of INC-AIADMK, for the next decade winning 38 seats in 1989 election and all 39 seats in 1991 election. The allocation of seats were done what was later dubbed, "The M.G.R formula". Where the regional party would contest 70% of the assembly seats and the national party would be given 70% of the Lok Sabha seats.

== Seat Allotment ==
=== Congress-AIADMK Front ===
AIADMK-led Alliance
| Party | Flag | Symbol | Leader | Seats |
| Indian National Congress | | | Rajiv Gandhi | 26 |
| All India Anna Dravida Munnetra Kazhagam | | | M. G. Ramachandran | 12 |
| Gandhi Kamaraj National Congress | | | Kumari Ananthan | 1 |
| Total | | | | 39 |

=== DMK Progressive Alliance ===
DMK Progressive Alliance
| Party | Flag | Symbol | Leader | Seats | |
| Dravida Munnetra Kazhagam | | | M. Karunanidhi | 26 | 27 |
| Indian Union Muslim League | | | M. Abdul Lathief | 1 | 27 |
| Janata Party | | | Era Sezhiyan | 5 | |
| Communist Party of India (Marxist) | | | A. Nallasivam | 3 | |
| Communist Party of India | | | P. Manickam | 3 | |
| Tamil Nadu Kamaraj Congress | | | Pazha. Nedumaran | 1 | |
| Total | | | | 39 | |

== List of Candidates ==
| Constituency | | AIADMK+ | | DMK+ | |
| # | Name | Party | Candidate | Party | Candidate |
|---|---|---|---|---|---|
| 1 | Madras North | INC | G. Lakshmanan | DMK | N. V. N. Somu |
| 2 | Madras Central | GKC | E. Earnest Paul | DMK | A. Kalanithi |
| 3 | Madras South | INC | Vyjayanthimala | JP | Era Sezhiyan |
| 4 | Sriperumbudur (SC) | INC | M. Chandrasekar | DMK | T. Nagaratnam |
| 5 | Chengalpattu | ADMK | S. Jagathrakshakan | DMK | M. V. Ramu |
| 6 | Arakkonam | INC | J. Rangaswamy | DMK | Pulavar K. Govindan |
| 7 | Vellore | ADMK | A. C. Shanmugam | DMK | A. M. Ramalingam |
| 8 | Tiruppattur | INC | A. Jayamohan | DMK | M. Abdul Lathief (Note: Indian Union Muslim League contested on the "Rising Sun" symbol of the Dravida Munnetra Kazhagam (DMK), and is officially recorded as a DMK candidate in electoral records.) |
| 9 | Vandavasi | INC | L. Balaraman | DMK | R. K. Pandian |
| 10 | Tindivanam | INC | S. S. Ramasami | JP | M. R. Lakshminarayanan |
| 11 | Cuddalore | INC | P. R. S. Venkatesan | DMK | T. Ramu Alias Killivalavan |
| 12 | Chidambaram (SC) | INC | P. Vallalperuman | DMK | S. Kannapiran |
| 13 | Dharmapuri | ADMK | M. Thambidurai | CPI | Parvathi Krishnan |
| 14 | Krishnagiri | INC | K. Ramamurthy | DMK | T. Chandrasekaran |
| 15 | Rasipuram (SC) | INC | B. Devarajan | DMK | P. Duraisami |
| 16 | Salem | INC | R. Kumaramangalam | JP | M. A. Kandasamy |
| 17 | Tiruchengode | ADMK | P. Kannan | DMK | M. Kandaswamy |
| 18 | Nilgiris | INC | R. Prabhu | DMK | C. T. Dhandapani |
| 19 | Gobichettipalayam | ADMK | P. Kholandaivelu | DMK | P. A. Saminathan |
| 20 | Coimbatore | INC | C. K. Kuppuswamy | CPI(M) | R. Umanath |
| 21 | Pollachi (SC) | ADMK | R. Anna Nambi | DMK | K. Krishnaswamy |
| 22 | Palani | INC | A. Senapathi Gounder | TNC | S. R. Velusamy |
| 23 | Dindigul | ADMK | K. R. Natarajan | DMK | Maya Thevar |
| 24 | Madurai | INC | A. G. Subburaman | CPI(M) | N. Sankariah |
| 25 | Periyakulam | ADMK | P. Selvendran | DMK | S. Agniraju |
| 26 | Karur | INC | A. R. Murugaiah | DMK | M. Kandaswamy |
| 27 | Tiruchirappalli | INC | L. Adaikalaraj | DMK | N. Selvaraj |
| 28 | Perambalur (SC) | ADMK | S. Thangaraju | DMK | C. Thiyagarajan |
| 29 | Mayiladuthurai | INC | E. S. M. Packeer Md. | DMK | P. Kalayanam |
| 30 | Nagapattinam (SC) | ADMK | M. Mahalingam | CPI | K. Murugaiyan |
| 31 | Thanjavur | INC | S. Singaravadivel | DMK | S. Palanimanickam |
| 32 | Pudukkottai | INC | N. Sundarraj | DMK | K. Veeriah |
| 33 | Sivaganga | INC | P. Chidambaram | DMK | Tha. Kiruttinan |
| 34 | Ramanathapuram | INC | V. Rajeshwaran | DMK | M. S. K. Sathyendran |
| 35 | Sivakasi | ADMK | N. Soundararajan | CPI | A. Srinivasan |
| 36 | Tirunelveli | ADMK | R. Janarthanan | DMK | D. S. A. Sivaprakasam |
| 37 | Tenkasi (SC) | INC | M. Arunachalam | CPI(M) | R. Krishnan |
| 38 | Tiruchendur | INC | K. T. Kosalram | JP | Jawaharlal |
| 39 | Nagercoil | INC | N. Dennis | JP | P. Vijayaraghavan |

== Voting and results ==
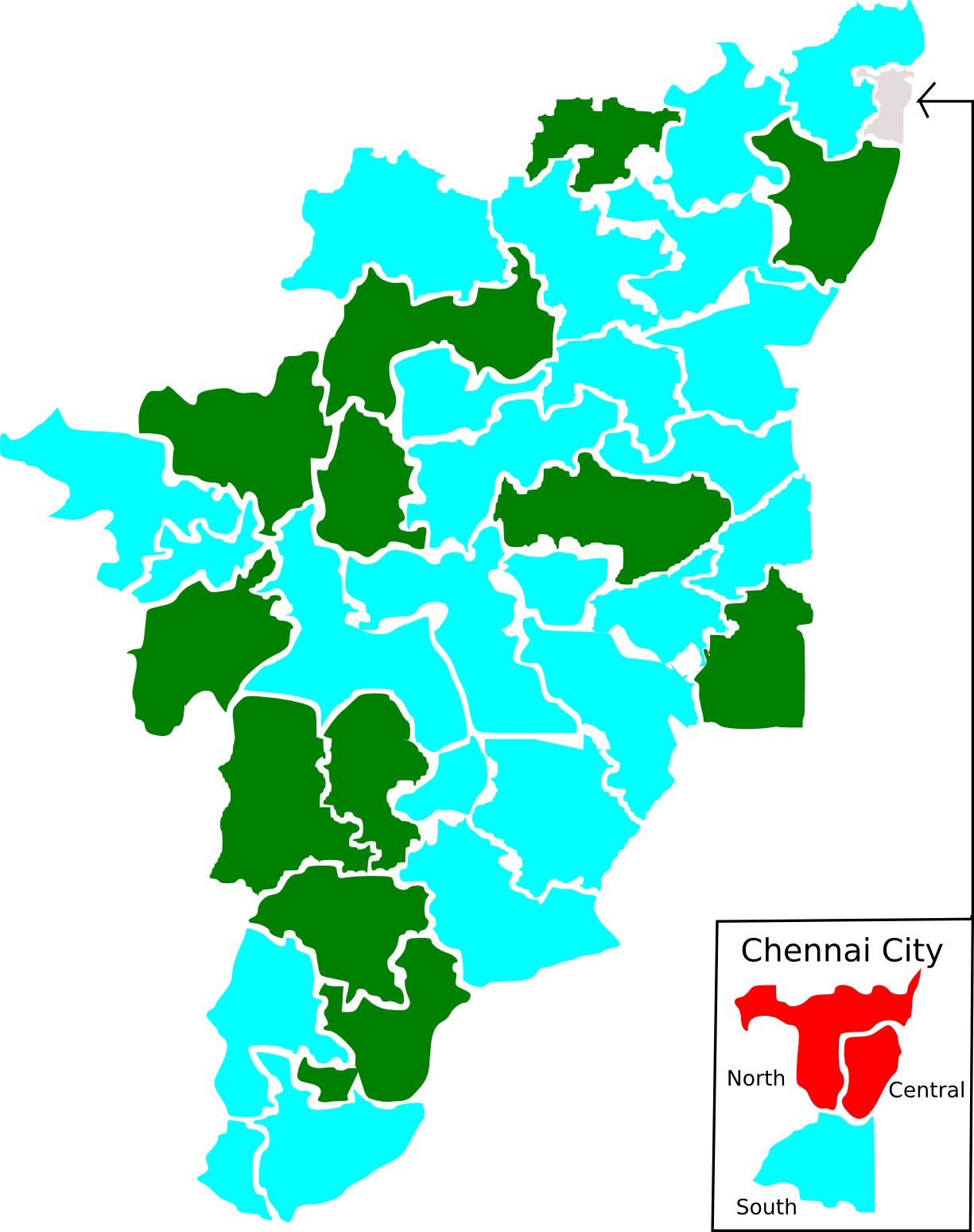
Election map of results based on parties. Colours are based on the results table on the left

| Alliance | Party | Popular Vote | Percentage | Swing | Seats won | Seat Change |
|---|---|---|---|---|---|---|
| AIADMK+ | Indian National Congress | 8,755,871 | 40.51% | ▲8.89% | 25 | ▲5 |
| AIADMK+ | All India Anna Dravida Munnetra Kazhagam | 3,968,967 | 18.36% | ▼7.02% | 12 | ▲10 |
| AIADMK+ | Gandhi Kamaraj National Congress | 217,104 | 1.00% | new party | 0 | new party |
| AIADMK+ | Total | 12,941,942 | 59.87% | ▲2.87% | 37 | ▲15 |
| DMK+ | Dravida Munnetra Kazhagam | 5,597,507 | 25.90% | ▲2.89% | 2 | ▼14 |
| DMK+ | Janata Party | 911,931 | 4.22% | ▼3.74% | 0 | Steady |
| DMK+ | Communist Party of India | 738,106 | 3.41% | ▼0.18% | 0 | Steady |
| DMK+ | Communist Party of India (Marxist) | 614,893 | 2.84% | ▼0.37% | 0 | Steady |
| DMK+ | Tamil Nadu Congress | 144,076 | 0.67% | new party | 0 | new party |
| DMK+ | Total | 8,006,513 | 37.04% | ▼0.73% | 2 | ▼14 |
| Indian National Congress (Jagjivan) | | 56,704 | 0.26% | new party | 0 | new party |
| Bharatiya Janata Party | | 15,462 | 0.07% | new party | 0 | new party |
| Independents | | 593,382 | 2.76% | ▼1.65% | 0 | ▼1 |
| Total | | 21,614,003 | 100.00% | Steady | 39 | Steady |
| Valid Votes | | 21,614,003 | 95.67% | | | |
| Invalid Votes | | 977,940 | 4.33% | | | |
| Total Votes | | 22,591,943 | 100.00% | | | |
| Registered Voters/Turnout | | 30,958,080 | 72.98% | ▲6.22% | | |

- The seats from 1980 election represent the seats of the coalition in this election, and the seats represented from Congress is from the Indira faction.

== List of Elected MPs ==
| Constituency | | Winner | | | | Runner Up | | | | Margin | % |
| # | Name | Candidate | Party | Votes | % | Candidate | Party | Votes | % | Margin | % |
|---|---|---|---|---|---|---|---|---|---|---|---|
| 1 | Madras North | N. V. N. Somu | DMK | 261,941 | 52.20 | G. Lakshmanan | INC | 225,491 | 44.93 | 36,450 | 7.27 |
| 2 | Madras Central | A. Kalanidhi | DMK | 313,848 | 58.21 | E. Earnest Paul | GKC | 217,104 | 40.27 | 96,744 | 17.94 |
| 3 | Madras South | Vyjayanthimala | INC | 336,353 | 51.92 | Era Sezhiyan | JP | 288,336 | 44.51 | 48,017 | 7.41 |
| 4 | Sriperumbudur (SC) | Maragatham Chandrasekhar | INC | 332,468 | 59.54 | T. Nagaratnam | DMK | 222,994 | 39.93 | 109,474 | 19.61 |
| 5 | Chengalpattu | S. Jagathrakshakan | ADMK | 297,415 | 54.09 | M. V. Ramu | DMK | 239,206 | 43.50 | 58,209 | 10.59 |
| 6 | Arakkonam | R. Jeevarathinam | INC | 292,606 | 52.20 | K. Govindan Pulavar | DMK | 231,664 | 41.33 | 60,942 | 10.87 |
| 7 | Vellore | A. C. Shanmugam | ADMK | 284,416 | 52.93 | A. M. Ramalingam | DMK | 209,693 | 39.02 | 74,723 | 13.91 |
| 8 | Tiruppattur | A. Jayamohan | INC | 298,159 | 55.59 | M. Abdul Latheef | DMK | 176,372 | 32.88 | 121,787 | 22.71 |
| 9 | Vandavasi | L. Balaraman | INC | 341,267 | 62.32 | R. K. Pandian | DMK | 206,375 | 37.68 | 134,892 | 24.64 |
| 10 | Tindivanam | S. S. Ramasamy Padayatchi | INC | 356,127 | 68.47 | M. R. Lakshminarayanan | JP | 154,269 | 29.66 | 201,858 | 38.81 |
| 11 | Cuddalore | P. R. S. Venkatesan | INC | 327,393 | 61.18 | T. Ramu Alias Killivalavan | DMK | 195,439 | 36.52 | 131,954 | 24.66 |
| 12 | Chidambaram (SC) | P. Vallalperuman | INC | 329,892 | 61.22 | S. Kannapiran | DMK | 209,001 | 38.78 | 120,891 | 22.44 |
| 13 | Dharmapuri | M. Thambi Durai | ADMK | 333,427 | 63.33 | Parvathi Krishnan | CPI | 182,175 | 34.60 | 151,252 | 28.73 |
| 14 | Krishnagiri | K. Ramamurthi | INC | 304,854 | 64.74 | T. Chandrasekaran | DMK | 138,488 | 29.41 | 166,366 | 35.33 |
| 15 | Rasipuram (SC) | B. Devarajan | INC | 367,276 | 68.89 | P. Duraisami | DMK | 165,870 | 31.11 | 201,406 | 37.78 |
| 16 | Salem | Rangarajan Kumaramangalam | INC | 359,819 | 69.21 | M. A. Kandasamy | JP | 123,644 | 23.78 | 236,175 | 45.43 |
| 17 | Tiruchengode | P. Kannan | ADMK | 426,648 | 60.93 | M. Kandaswamy | DMK | 268,582 | 38.35 | 158,066 | 22.58 |
| 18 | Nilgiris | R. Prabhu | INC | 341,824 | 60.31 | C. T. Dhandapani | DMK | 209,885 | 37.03 | 131,939 | 23.28 |
| 19 | Gobichettipalayam | P. Kholandaivelu | ADMK | 338,243 | 64.49 | P. A. Saminathan | DMK | 177,616 | 33.86 | 160,627 | 30.63 |
| 20 | Coimbatore | C. K. Kuppuswamy | INC | 355,525 | 57.77 | R. Umanath | CPI(M) | 253,006 | 41.11 | 102,519 | 16.66 |
| 21 | Pollachi (SC) | R. Anna Nambi | ADMK | 324,200 | 59.27 | K. Krishnaswamy | DMK | 222,770 | 40.73 | 101,430 | 18.54 |
| 22 | Palani | A. Senapathy Gounder | INC | 408,104 | 71.26 | S. R. Velusamy | TNC | 144,076 | 25.16 | 264,028 | 46.10 |
| 23 | Dindigul | K. R. Natarajan | ADMK | 343,571 | 61.79 | K. Maya Thevar | DMK | 202,253 | 36.38 | 141,318 | 25.41 |
| 24 | Madurai | A. G. Subburaman | INC | 365,948 | 62.72 | N. Sankariah | CPI(M) | 192,937 | 33.07 | 173,011 | 29.65 |
| 25 | Periyakulam | P. Selvendran | ADMK | 348,903 | 62.90 | S. Agniraju | DMK | 190,290 | 34.30 | 158,613 | 28.60 |
| 26 | Karur | A. R. Murugaiah | INC | 413,533 | 68.36 | M. Kandaswamy | DMK | 177,970 | 29.42 | 235,563 | 38.94 |
| 27 | Tiruchirappalli | Adaikalaraj | INC | 337,786 | 58.05 | N. Selvarasu | DMK | 234,881 | 40.37 | 102,905 | 17.68 |
| 28 | Perambalur (SC) | S. Thangaraju | ADMK | 350,549 | 63.57 | C. Thiyagarajan | DMK | 197,780 | 35.87 | 152,769 | 27.70 |
| 29 | Mayiladuthurai | E. S. M. Pakeer Mohamed | INC | 335,033 | 60.16 | P. Kalayanam | DMK | 215,390 | 38.68 | 119,643 | 21.48 |
| 30 | Nagapattinam (SC) | M. Mahalingam | ADMK | 300,912 | 49.91 | K. Murugaiyan | CPI | 298,623 | 49.53 | 2,289 | 0.38 |
| 31 | Thanjavur | Singaravadivel | INC | 306,351 | 55.35 | S. Palanimanickam | DMK | 217,030 | 39.21 | 89,321 | 16.14 |
| 32 | Pudukkottai | N. Sundararaj | INC | 426,717 | 68.43 | K. Veeriah | DMK | 161,813 | 25.95 | 264,904 | 42.48 |
| 33 | Sivaganga | P. Chidambaram | INC | 377,160 | 68.10 | Tha Krutinan | DMK | 164,627 | 29.73 | 212,533 | 38.37 |
| 34 | Ramanathapuram | V. Rajeshwaran | INC | 274,922 | 51.09 | M. S. K. Sathiyendren | DMK | 174,778 | 32.48 | 100,144 | 18.61 |
| 35 | Sivakasi | N. Soundararajan | ADMK | 323,786 | 53.69 | A. Srinivasan | CPI | 257,308 | 42.67 | 66,478 | 11.02 |
| 36 | Tirunelveli | M. R. Janardhanan | ADMK | 296,897 | 57.64 | D. S. A. Sivaprakasam | DMK | 210,951 | 40.95 | 85,946 | 16.69 |
| 37 | Tenkasi (SC) | M. Arunachalam | INC | 360,517 | 68.09 | R. Krishnan | CPI(M) | 168,950 | 31.91 | 191,567 | 36.18 |
| 38 | Tiruchendur | K. T. Kosalram | INC | 345,381 | 71.27 | Jawaharlal | JP | 121,954 | 25.17 | 223,427 | 46.10 |
| 39 | Nagercoil | N. Dennis | INC | 235,365 | 50.01 | P. Vijayaraghavan | JP | 223,728 | 47.54 | 11,637 | 2.47 |

== Post-election Union Council of Ministers from Tamil Nadu ==
| SI No. | Name | Constituency | Designation | Department | From | To | Party |
|---|---|---|---|---|---|---|---|
| 1 | Maragatham Chandrasekar | Sriperumbudur (SC) | Minister of State (Independent Charge) | Women and Social Welfare | 31 December 1984 | 25 September 1985 | INC |
| 2 | P. Chidambaram | Sivaganga | Deputy Minister | Commerce | 25 September 1985 | 27 September 1985 | INC |
| 2 | P. Chidambaram | Sivaganga | Deputy Minister | Textiles | 27 September 1985 | 4 October 1985 | INC |
| 2 | P. Chidambaram | Sivaganga | Deputy Minister | Personnel, Administrative Reforms, Training, Public Grievances and Pensions | 4 October 1985 | 20 January 1986 | INC |
| 2 | P. Chidambaram | Sivaganga | Minister of State | Personnel, Public Grievances and Pensions | 20 January 1986 | 2 December 1989 | INC |
| 2 | P. Chidambaram | Sivaganga | Minister of State | Home Affairs | 24 June 1986 | 2 December 1989 | INC |
| 3 | M. Arunachalam | Tenkasi (SC) | Minister of State | Industry (Industrial Development) | 25 September 1985 | 2 December 1989 | INC |
| 4 | R. Prabhu | Nilgiris | Minister of State | Agriculture (Fertilizers) | 22 October 1986 | 2 September 1989 | INC |

== Bypolls (1984-1989) ==
| District | Constituency | | Winner | | | | Runner up | | | | Margin |
| District | No. | Name | Candidate | Party | Votes | % | Candidate | Party | Votes | % | Margin |
|---|---|---|---|---|---|---|---|---|---|---|---|
| Tuticorin | | Tiruchendur | R. Dhanuskodi Athithan | INC | 169,710 | 62.0% | Pon. Vijayaraghavan | JP | 93,891 | 34.3% | 75,819 |
| Tuticorin | | Tiruchendur | Bypoll held on 1985 following the death of the incumbent member K.T. Kosalram from Indian National Congress on 27 January 1985. | | | | | | | | |

== See also ==
- Elections in Tamil Nadu

== Bibliography ==
- Volume I, 1984 Indian general election, 8th Lok Sabha
