= 1952–1995 Tamil Nadu by-elections =

State election in India

Below is a list of by-elections held in Tamil Nadu from 1952 to 1995.

== 1993 ==
The by-election took place due to the death of Shri Senapathy.

Tamil Nadu assembly by-election, 1993: Palani
Party	Candidate	Votes	%	±%
AIADMK	Palaniyappa Gounder Kumarasamy	278,995	42.4%	
DMK	Smt. Subbulaxmi	234,070	35.6%	
INC	Venugopal	130,626	19.8%	
Majority		44,925		
Turnout		658,145		
AIADMK hold		Swing		

== 1985 ==
The by-election took place due to the death of Shri K.T. Kosalram.

Tamil Nadu assembly by-election, 1985: Tiruchendur
Party	Candidate	Votes	%	±%
INC	R. Dhanuskodi Athithan	169,710	62.0%	
JP	P. Vijayaraghavan	93,891	34.3%	
Majority		75,819		
Turnout		273,776		
INC hold		Swing		

== 1982 ==
The by-election took place due to the death of Shri C.N. Natarajan.

Tamil Nadu assembly by-election, 1982: Periyakulam
Party	Candidate	Votes	%	±%
AIADMK	S.T.K. Jakkay	252,377	50.1%	
DMK	C.N Eramaddrishnan	183,117	36.4%	
INC	A.K. Sheik	28,869	5.7%	
CPI	A. Wahab	16,366	3.2%	
Independent	M. Pandian	10,261	2.0%	
Majority		69,260		
Turnout		503,651		
AIADMK gain from DMK		Swing		

== 1980 ==
The by-election took place due to the death of Shri Karunanithi Thazhai.

Tamil Nadu assembly by-election, 1980: Nagapattinam
Party	Candidate	Votes	%	±%
CPI	K. Murugaiyan	288,000	51.1%	
AIADMK	M. Mahalingam	272,059	48.3%	
Majority		15,941		
Turnout		563,400		
CPI gain from DMK		Swing		

Tamil Nadu assembly by-election, 1980: Thanjavur
Party	Candidate	Votes	%	±%
INC	S. Singravadivel	309,868	57.5%	+4.6%
AIADMK	P. Dharmalingam	217,020	40.3%	−3.9%
Majority		92,848		
Turnout		538,725		
INC hold		Swing		

- Note: S. Singravadivel ran as a candidate with Congress (Indira faction).

== 1973 ==
The by-election took place due to the death of Shri M.Rajangam.

Bye-election, 1973: Dindigul
Party	Candidate	Votes	%	±%
AIADMK	K. Maya Thevar	2,60,824	52.0	
INC(O)	V. C. Sitthan	1,19,032	20.1%	
DMK	Pon Muthu Ramalingam	93,496	18.5%	
INC	Seemaisamy	11,423	2.2%	
Majority		1,41,792		
Turnout		6,43,704		
AIADMK gain from DMK		Swing		
