= Madhubani Lok Sabha constituency =

Lok Sabha constituency in Bihar, India

Coordinates: 26.3°N 86.1°E

Madhubani
- Lok Sabha constituency

Constituency details
- Country: India
- Region: East India
- State: Bihar
- Established: 1956
- Reservation: None

Member of Parliament
- 18th Lok Sabha
- Incumbent Ashok Kumar Yadav
- Party: BJP
- Alliance: NDA
- Elected year: 2024
- Preceded by: Hukmdev Narayan Yadav, BJP

Madhubani is one of the 40 Lok Sabha (parliamentary) constituencies in Bihar in India.

== Assembly segments ==
Presently, Madhubani Lok Sabha constituency comprises the following six Assembly segments after reorganisation in 1976:

#	Name	District	Member	Party	2024 lead
31	Harlakhi	Madhubani	Sudhanshu Shekhar	JD(U)	BJP
32	Benipatti	Madhubani	Vinod Narayan Jha	BJP	BJP
35	Bisfi	Madhubani	Asif Ahmad	RJD	BJP
36	Madhubani	Madhubani	Madhav Anand	RLM	BJP
86	Keoti	Darbhanga	Murari Mohan Jha	BJP	BJP
87	Jale	Darbhanga	Jibesh Mishra	BJP	BJP

Before 1976, Madhubani assembly segment formed part of eastern Lok Sabha constituency of the district of same name, but after 1976 the eastern Lok Sabha constituency was renamed as Jhanjharpur because Madhubani assembly segment was taken out of it to be merged into former Jainagar Lok Sabha constituency. Jainagar Lok Sabha constituency included western assembly segments of Madhubani district besides Jale assembly segment from Darbhanga district. After inclusion of Madhubani assembly segment, Jainagar Lok Sabha constituency was renamed as Madhubani and Ladania CD block and adjoining areas were taken out of it to be merged into newly formed Jhanjharpur Lok Sabha constituency in order to compensate for the loss of Madhubani assembly segment. After this reorganisation, communist vote bank in the district was bifurcated and CPI had to face greater difficulties in winning the eastern Lok Sabha constituency of this district which was won by CPI candidate Bhogendra Jha in 1967 and 1971.

== Members of Parliament ==
Before reorganisation in 1976, the following members were elected to Madhubani seat which comprised eastern part of Madhubani district including the district headquarters:

- 1952: Anirudha Sinha, Indian National Congress (Darbhanga East Seat)
- 1957: Anirudha Sinha, Indian National Congress
- 1962: Yogendra Jha, Praja Socialist Party
- 1967: Shiva Chandra Jha, Samyukta Socialist Party
- 1971: Jagannath Mishra, Indian National Congress

After reorganisation in 1976, the following members were elected to Madhubani seat, which comprised western part of Madhubani district formerly known as Jainagar Lok Sabha constituency (the eastern constituency of the district renamed as Jhanjharpur in 1976):

Year	Name	Party
1957	Shyam Nandan Mishra	Indian National Congress
1962	Yamuna Prasad Mandal	Indian National Congress
1967	Bhogendra Jha	Communist Party of India
1971	Bhogendra Jha	Communist Party of India
1977	Hukmdev Narayan Yadav	Janata Party
1980	Shafiqullah Ansari	Indian National Congress
1980^	Bhogendra Jha	Communist Party of India
1984	Abdul Hannan Ansari	Indian National Congress
1989	Bhogendra Jha	Communist Party of India
1991	Bhogendra Jha	Communist Party of India
1996	Chaturanan Mishra	Communist Party of India
1998	Shakeel Ahmad	Indian National Congress
1999	Hukmdev Narayan Yadav	Bharatiya Janata Party
2004	Shakeel Ahmad	Indian National Congress
2009	Hukmdev Narayan Yadav	Bharatiya Janata Party
2014	Hukmdev Narayan Yadav	Bharatiya Janata Party
2019	Ashok Yadav	Bharatiya Janata Party
2024	Ashok Yadav	Bharatiya Janata Party

== Election Results ==
=== 2024 ===
2024 Indian general elections: Madhubani
Party	Candidate	Votes	%	±%
BJP	Ashok Kumar Yadav	553,428	53.83	
RJD	Mohammad Ali Ashraf Fatimi	401,483	39.05	
NOTA	None of the Above	20,719	1.07	
Majority		151,945	14.78	
Turnout		10,28,128	53.08	
BJP hold		Swing		

=== 2019 ===
General Election, 2019: Madhubani
Party	Candidate	Votes	%	±%
BJP	Ashok Kumar Yadav	595,843	61.76	▲20.15
VIP	Badri Kumar Purbey	140,903	14.61	▲14.61
NOTA	None Of The Above	5,623	0.58	
Margin of victory		454,940	47.35	
Turnout		963,708	53.75	
BJP hold		Swing		

=== 2014 ===
2014 Indian general elections: Madhubani
Party	Candidate	Votes	%	±%
BJP	Hukm Deo Narayan Yadav	3,58,040	41.61	+12.13
RJD	Abdul Bari Siddiqui	3,37,505	39.22	+11.52
JD(U)	Prof. Ghulam Ghous	56,392	6.55	+6.55
SS	Rita Kumari	30,942	3.60	+3.60
NOTA	None of the Above	18,937	2.20	
BSP	Hari Narayan Yadav	10,115	1.18	−0.91
AAP	Neeraj Pathak	9,718	1.13	+1.13
Majority		20,535	2.39	
Turnout		8,60,453	52.86	
BJP hold		Swing		

== See also ==
- Madhubani district
- List of constituencies of the Lok Sabha
