= Manadu =

Manadu Thandupathu
- Village
- Nickname: Manadu Thandupathu
- Location in Tamil Nadu, India
- Coordinates: 8.4833°N 78.1167°E
- Country: India
- State: Tamil Nadu
- District: Thoothukudi

Government
  - Type: District Panchayat
  - Body: Village Panchayat

Languages
  - Official: Tamil
- Time zone: UTC+5:30 (IST)
- PIN: 628210
- Telephone code: 04639
- Vehicle registration: TN-92( TN-69 till Jun17,2015)
- Nearest city: Tirunelveli
- Nearest Airport: Thoothukudi
- Lok Sabha constituency: Thoothukudi; Formerly with Tiruchendur
- Rajya Sabha constituency: Tiruchendur

Manadu Thandupathu is an Indian village in Thoothukudi district near Tiruchendur above 12 km. It is famous for 'Pathene'.

Many people have moved to nearby cities, especially to Chennai.

== Temples ==
Manadu is home to a 1,300-year-old temple constructed during Pandya dynasty. The Chera and Pandya emblems are shown on the temple's inner wall. Seven Amman temples are used for worship by seven communities. Initially, many temples and well-developed houses resided in the area, but only two temples survive: Kaliyugavarathar Temple and Perumal temple in South Manadu.

Esakkiamman temple and Kaliamman temple are located there.

Pankuni Uthiram is a festival celebrated across Tamil Nadu.

Saiva Pillaimars, Nadars, Ascaris, Thevars, and Parayars are the communities.

== Festivals ==
Pongal, Dasara, Muniasamy Kovil (Chithirai), Amman Kovil (Thai), Manadu Sri Mariamman (Chithirai).

== History ==
The ancient village name "Manadu Thandupathu panchayat" derives from the two villages; namely Manadu and Thandupathu.

== Geography ==
Manadu is situated on the state highway and runs from Tiruchendur to Nagercoil, 12 km from Tiruchendur.

== Transport ==
The nearest railway station is Tiruchendur (12 km). For college, students go to Tiruchendur.

All buses that operate between Tiruchendur and Nagercoil stop in Manadu.

== Amenities ==
An indoor badminton stadium was built and operated by the help of the Tamil Nadu Government and local donors and well-wishers.

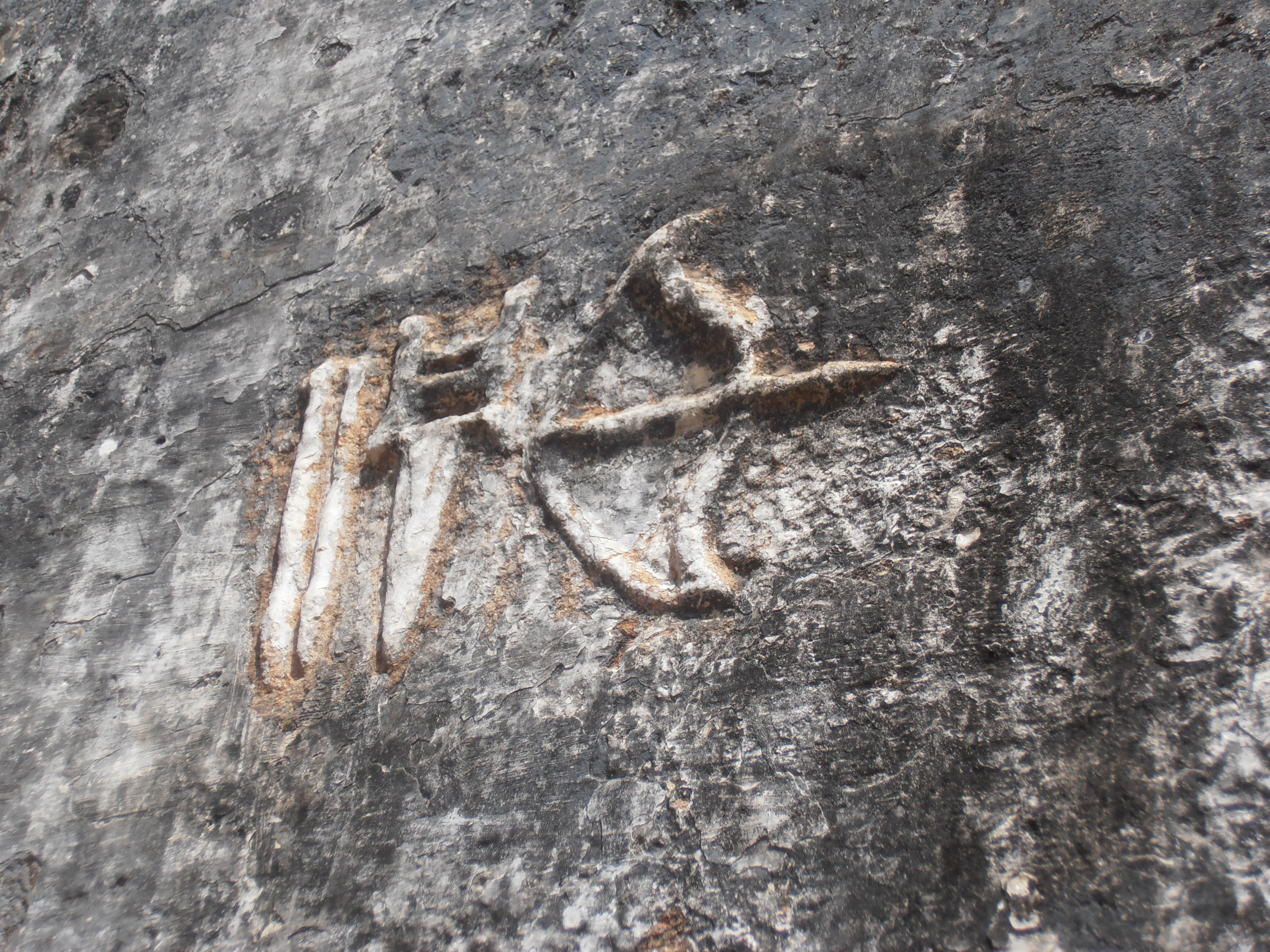
Kaliyugavarathar Temple

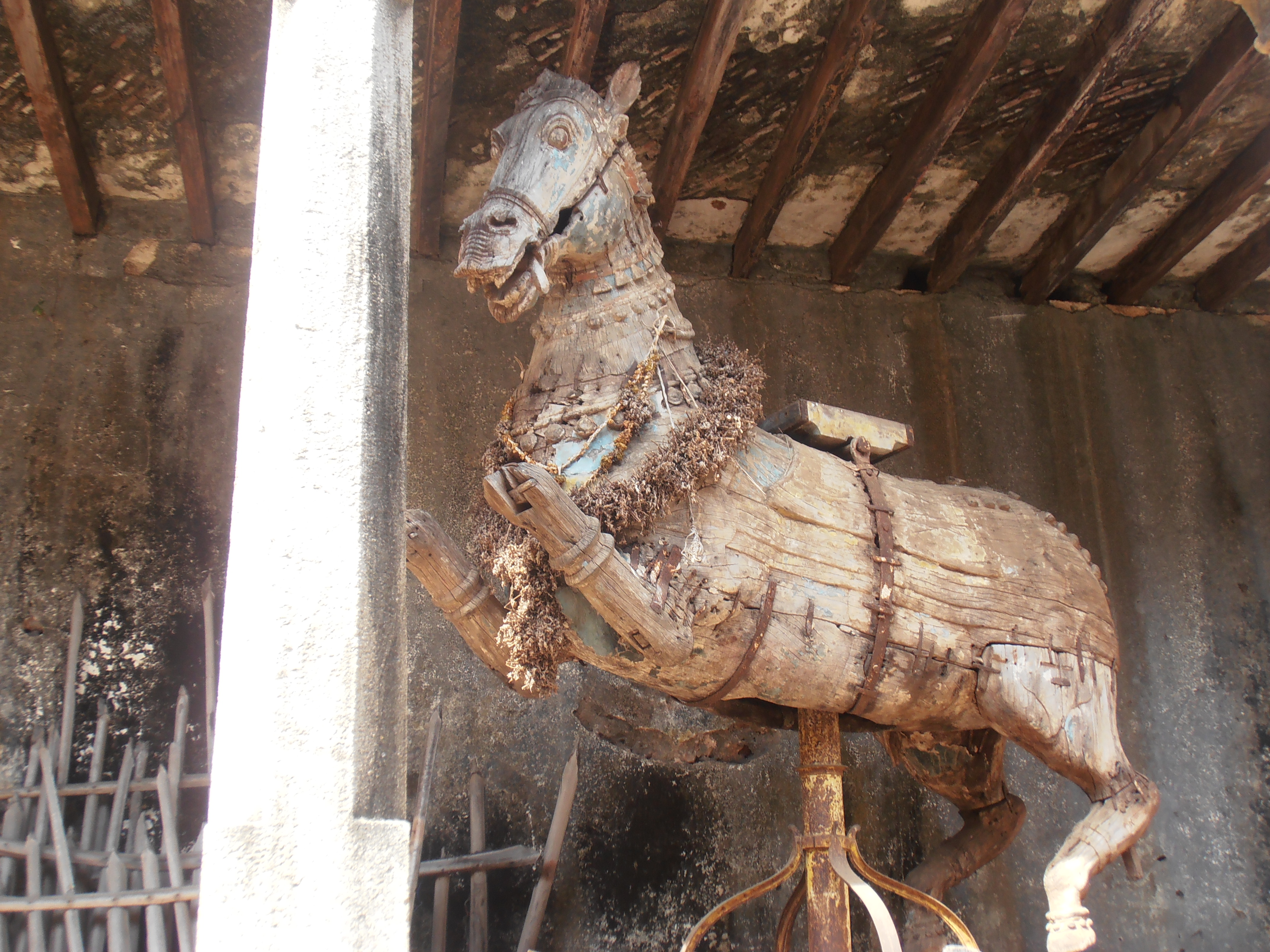
Kaliyugavarathar Temple Horse

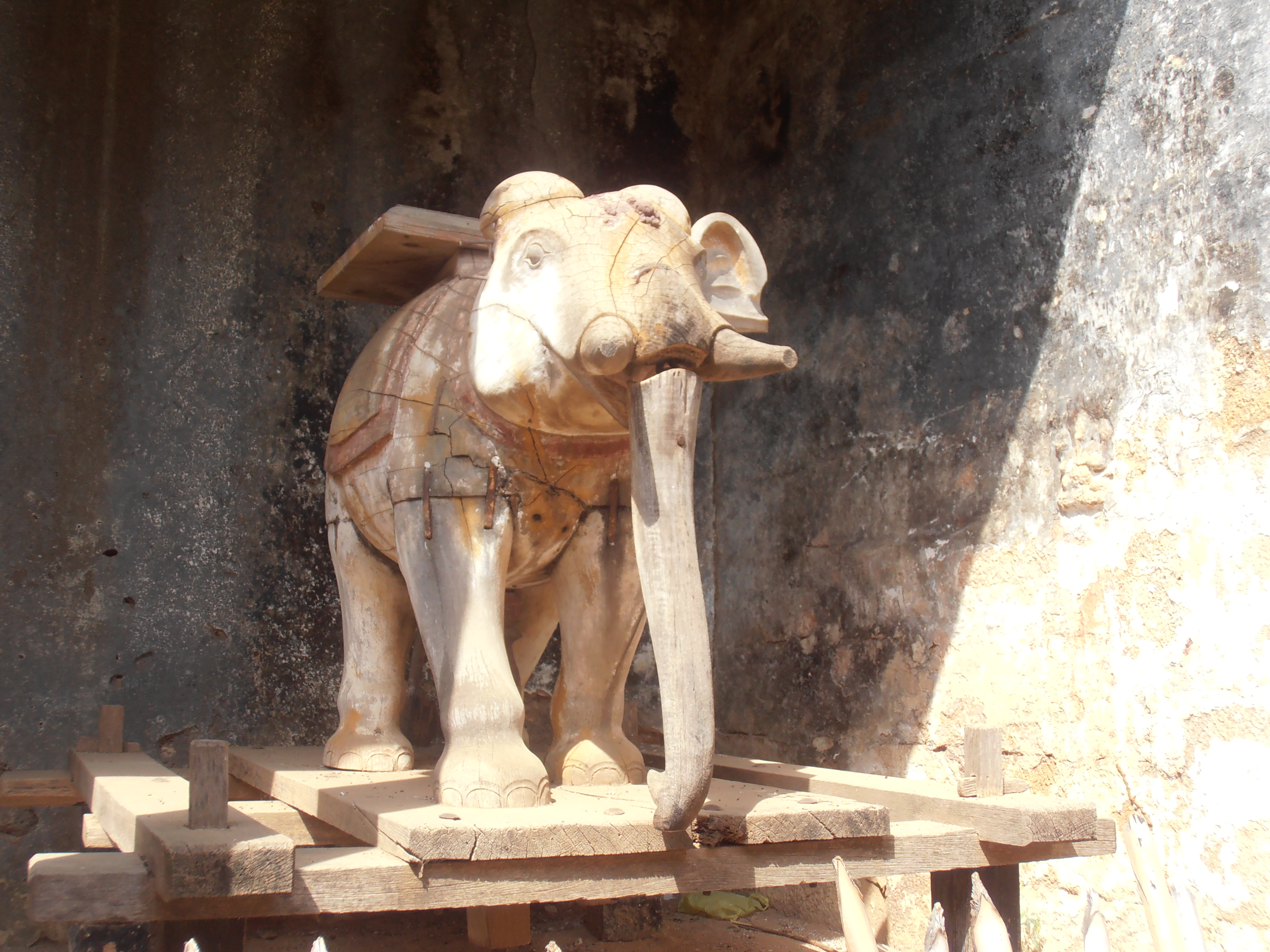
Kaliyugavarathar Temple Elephant

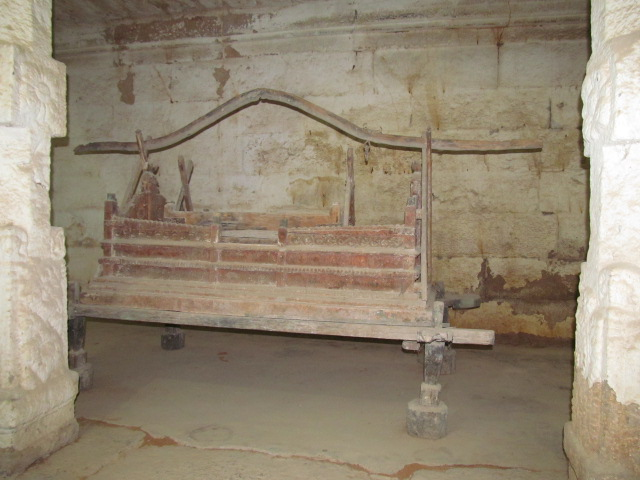
Kaliyugavarathar Temple Pallaku

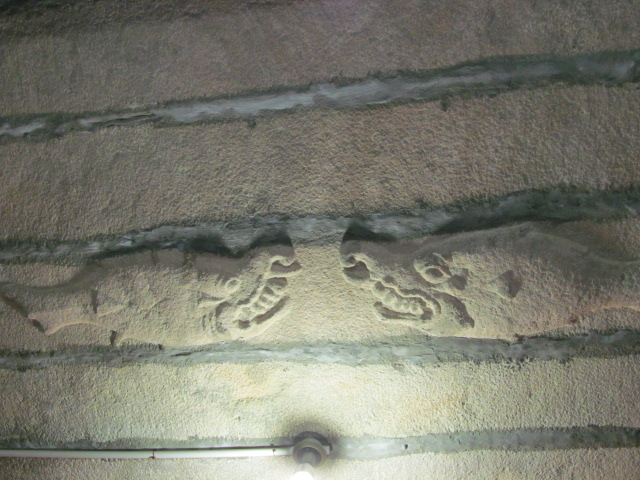
Kaliyugavarathar Temple

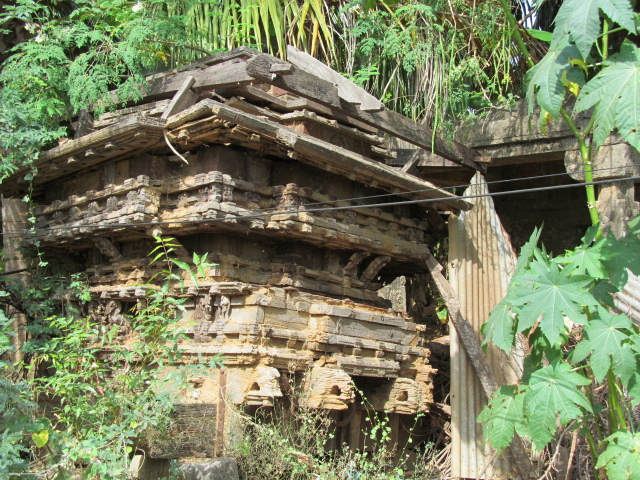
Kaliyugavarathar Temple Car

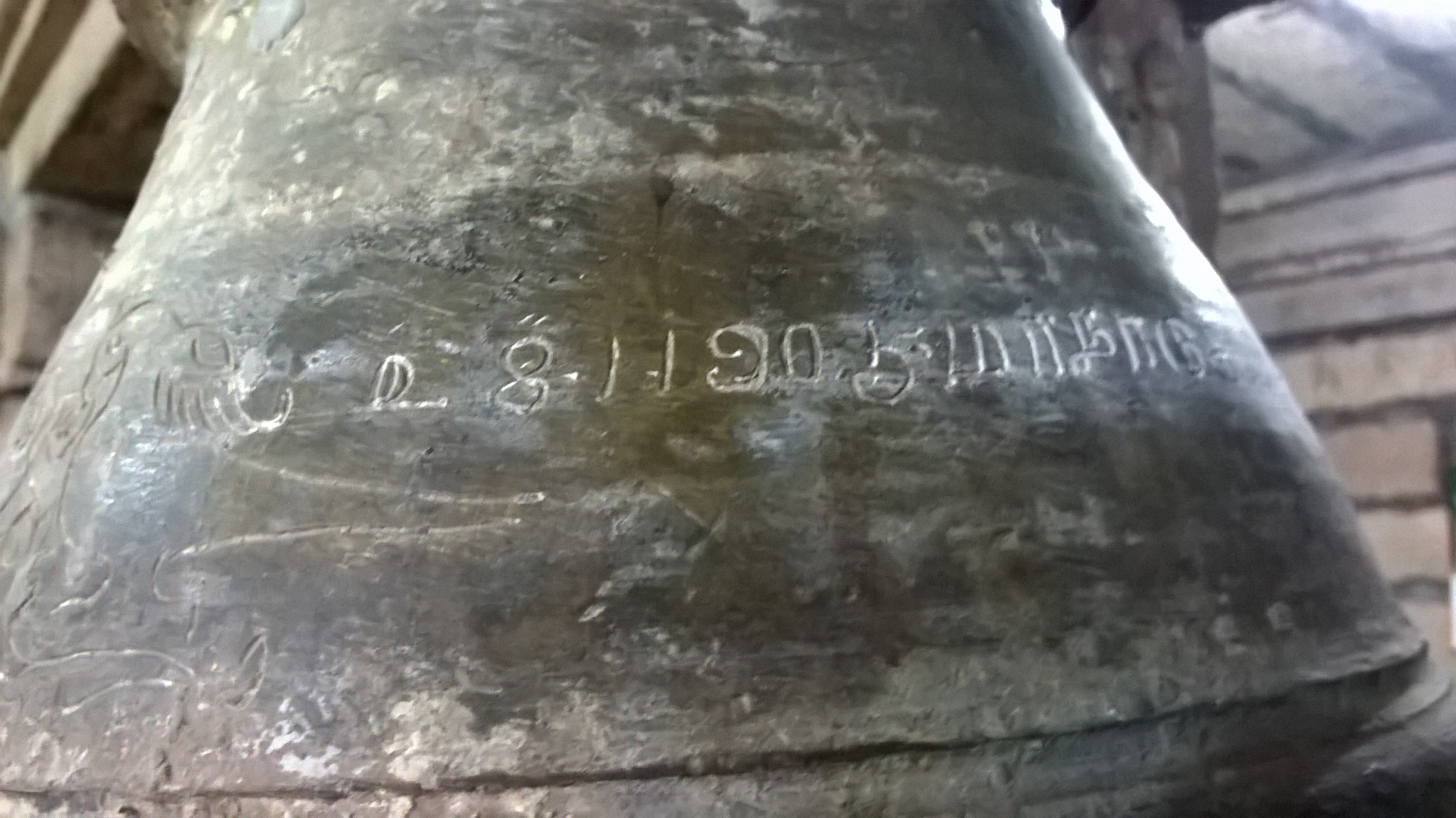
Kaliyugavarathar Temple Bell

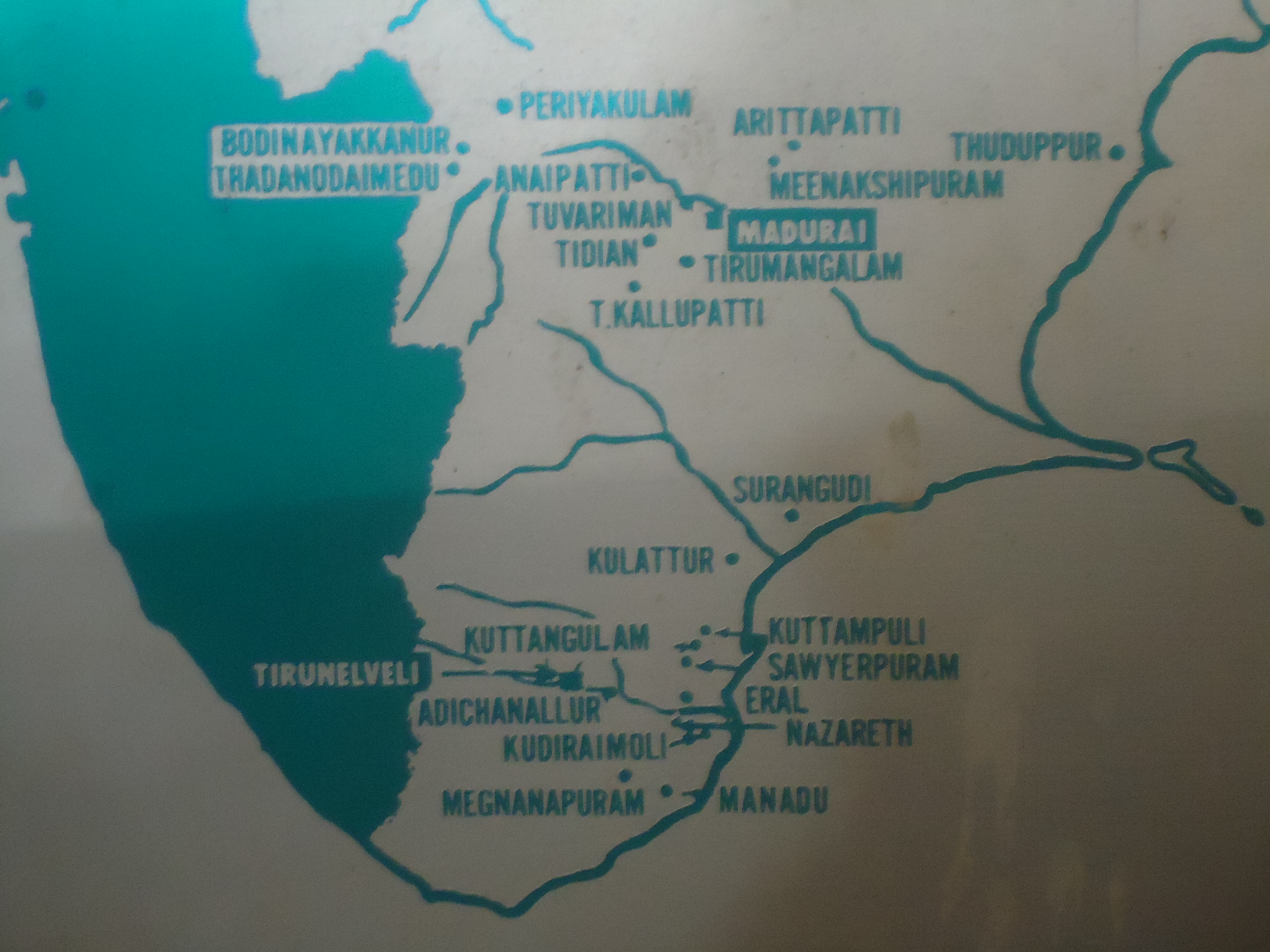
At Thirumalai Nayakar Mahal

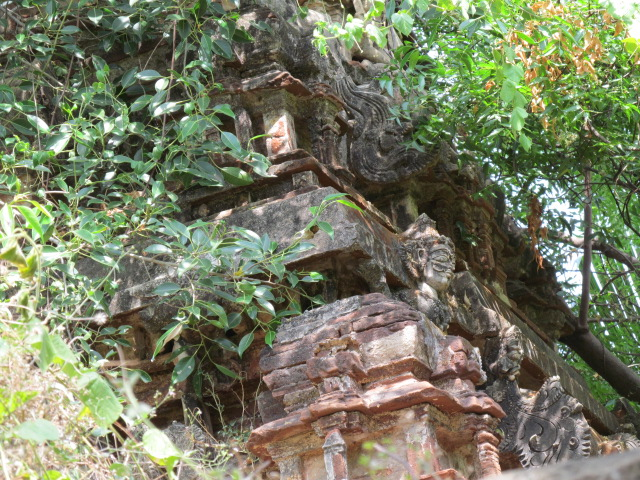
Perumal Kovil Gopuram

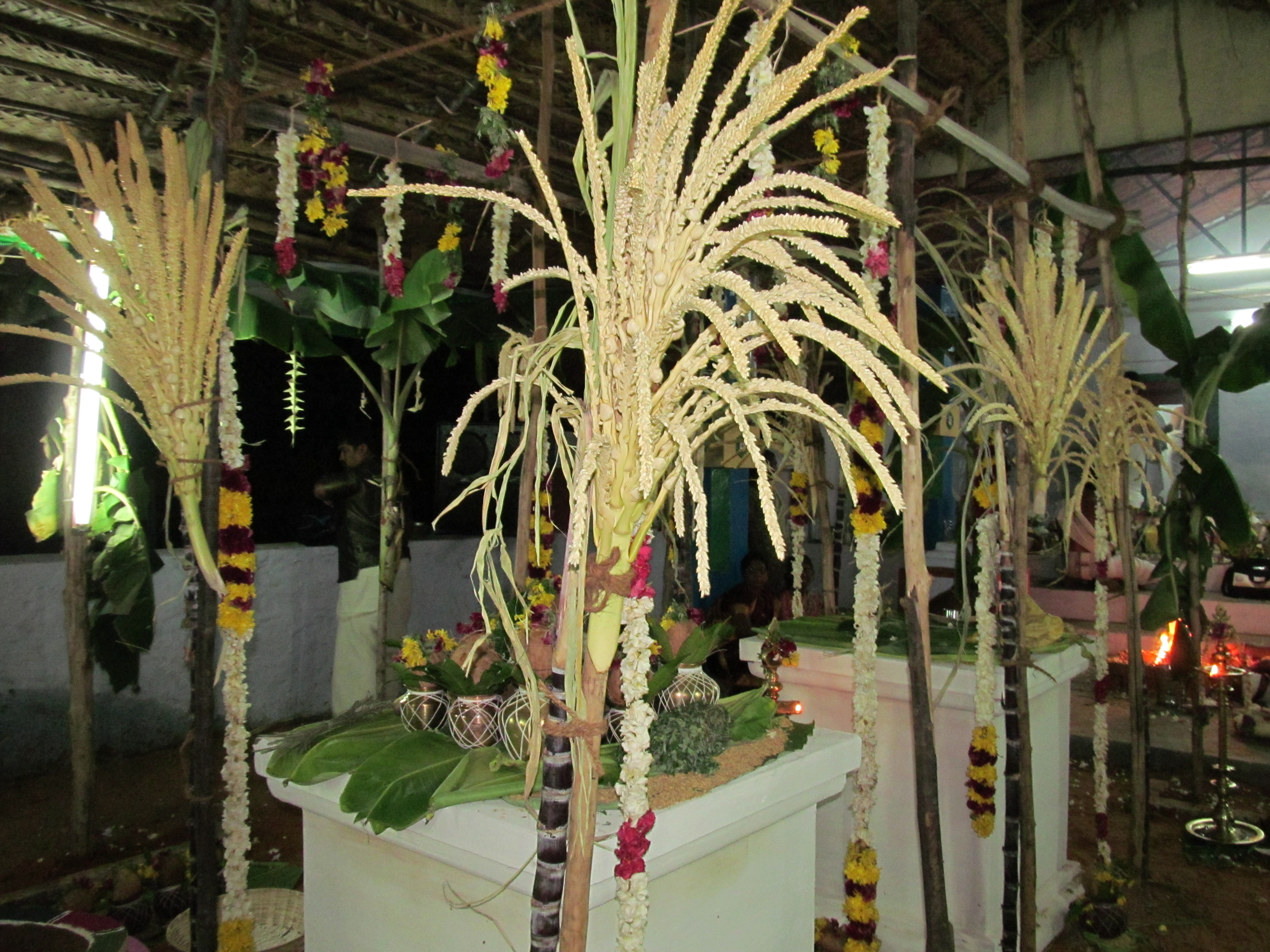
Manadu Amman Kovil
