= Jebamani Mohanraj =

Indian politician

Jebamani Mohanraj / Mohan Raj (Tamil: ஜெபமணி மோகன்ராஜ், Devanagari: जेबामणि मोहनराज; b. 1951–1952) is an Indian politician from Tamil Nadu who founded the Jebamani Janata Party, a registered unrecognized political party.

Mohanraj is the son of the "freedom fighter" Nellai R. Jebamani, who was elected in 1977 to represent the Sattankulam constituency in the Tamil Nadu assembly as a member of the Janata Party. Mohanraj named the Jebamani Janata Party after his father. As of October 2011, Mohanraj had "contested 15 elections to Parliament, the Assembly and the local body", and in April 2019, Mohanraj stated that the upcoming by-election to the Perambur assembly seat in Tamil Nadu would be his 13th, and that he had previously unsuccessfully ran in the Lok Sabha and Tamil Nadu elections.

Mohanraj was a member of the Tamil Nadu police for 21 years; he then joined the CBI in the late 1980s or early 1990s, where he joined the Special Investigation Team that investigated the May 1991 assassination of Rajiv Gandhi; he rejoined the state police in March 1993; and he took voluntary retirement in 1997, but remained active.

== Activism ==
Note: the dates are generally estimated based on the earliest publication dates of relevant news articles; the events described may have happened earlier.

- 2007: Mohanraj made a writ plea in the Madras High Court to object to the government's modification of Tamil Thai Valthu, the Tamil anthem, from the version originally written by Manonmaniam Sundaram Pillai. On 21 January 2022, the court dismissed the petition, stating that because the changes were made in 1972 (in a GO dated 1972 May 5), it was too late to file a petition, and that the changes were a valid policy decision by the government in order to avoid disparaging various languages that it referred to negatively.
- 2008, December: Mohanraj made a petition to the Madras High Court requesting a partial or total ban on Google Earth, stating that its satellite images of sensitive locations could hurt national security.
- 2009, May: Mohanraj admitted that when he declared the amount of his assets when registering as a candidate for the South Chennai Lok Sabha constituency, he made a false affidavit overstating his assets as being worth Rs 1,977 crore, in protest of other candidates understating their assets. Although making a false declaration was considered a criminal offense then, until it became a civil matter on 26 April 2014, he stated that he didn't even get a notice about his.
- 2009, October: Mohanraj filed a Public Interest Litigation (PIL) protesting the granting of geographical indication (GI) for Tirupati laddu to Tirumala Tirupati Devasthanam, as well as the granting of a trademark for the image of the presiding deity Kannagi Amman of the Attukal Temple to the Attukal Bhagavathy Temple Trust.
- 2010, April: Mohanraj made a petition to the Madras High Court requesting that use of the M.A. Chidambaram (MAC) Cricket Stadium be disallowed due to safety concerns about its structural integrity, and pointed out inconsistencies in the information that the Tamil Nadu Cricket Association (TNCA) provided to authorities. Mohanraj complained to the City Police Commissioner on 7 January 2011 and 19 July 2012, but did not follow the proper procedure to register the FIR. In these complaints, Mohanraj also made allegations that the TNCA was cheating the government with regards to lease payment and land allotment for the stadium. At least one of Mohanraj's petitions regarding the stability of the stadium was dismissed for reiterating already-dismissed allegations and failing to address contrary evidence.
- 2011, February: Mohanraj filed a PIL with the Madras High Court complaining about the lack of investigation into the fishermen killing cases and requesting uniform compensation for victims and their families.
- 2011, October: Mohanraj participated in the investigation of the May 1991 assassination of Rajiv Gandhi as an officer of the CBI, which he left in March 1993 due to frustrations over how the case was being handled, and now believes that death row prisoners V Srikaran "Murugan", T Suthentharajan "Santhan", and AG Perarivelan "Arivu" should be set free.
- 2012, December: Mohanraj filed a writ petition with the Madras High Court to challenge the appointment of Ranjit Sinha to Director of the CBI, stating that he was a "tainted officer" and that the appointment procedure was not followed properly. The court dismissed the petition, stating that Mohanraj did not provide enough evidence.
- 2013, October: Mohanraj filed a PIL with the Madras High Court requesting an investigation of KAL Cables Private Limited / Sumangali Cable Vision (SCV)'s cutting of TN Arasu Cable TV Corporation cables.
- 2015, April: Mohanraj contacted the Chief Secretary, then escalated to other authorities after failing to receive a proper response, over the disappearance of a hillock behind the camp-office of the Theni District Collector in Viranaickenpatty village; the land was supposed to be a poromboke, and no permission to mine it was given.
- 2019, April: When registering as a candidate for the byelection to the Perambur assembly segment in Tamil Nadu, Mohanraj again made a false declaration of his "criminal antecedents and assets" on Form 26, stating cash on hand of Rs 1.76 lakh crore, referencing the 2G spectrum scam, and debt to the World Bank of Rs four lakh crore, referencing the Tamil Nadu government's debt. The Election Commission accepted his affidavit and allocated the green chili symbol to him; Mohanraj stated that "With media focusing on my affidavit, Election Commission officials will feel like they have bitten an Andhra green chilli".
- 2022, May: Mohanraj filed a petition with the Madras High Court requesting that the Institute of Mental Health in Kilpauk disclose the status of Nataraja Moorthi, son of former Home Minister Kakkan, citing the institute's "sorry state of affairs" with patients that are fully cured but still stuck there. The court dismissed the petition, stating that the only evidence cited was social media posts.
