= Shakeel Ahmad =

Indian politician

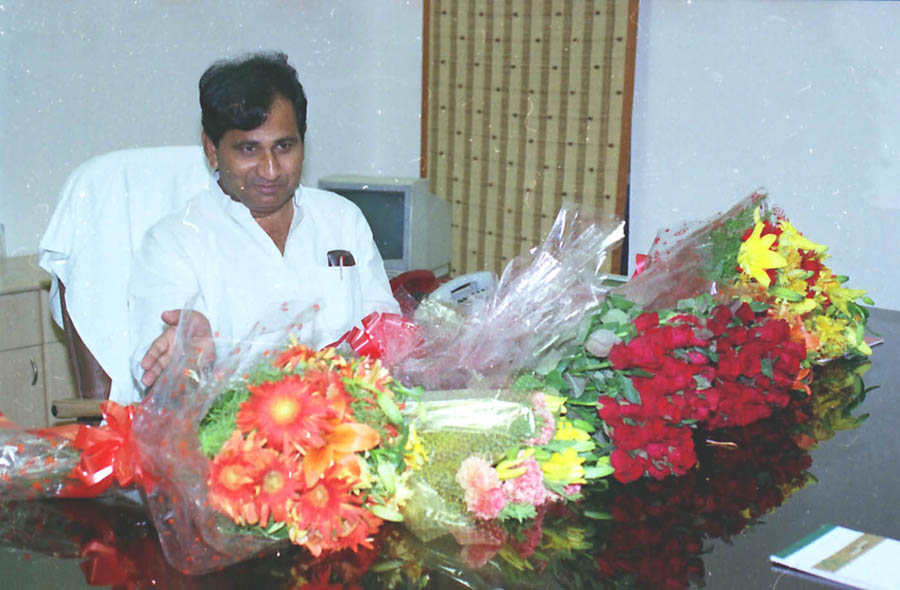
- Shakeel Ahmad as the Minister of State for Communications & Information Technology in New Delhi on 24 May 2004

Union Minister of State for Home Affairs
- In office 6 April 2008 – 23 May 2009
- Prime Minister: Manmohan Singh
- Preceded by: V. Radhika Selvi
- Succeeded by: Mullappally Ramachandran

Union Minister of State for Communications and Information Technology
- In office 23 May 2004 – 6 April 2008
- Prime Minister: Manmohan Singh
- Preceded by: Ashok Kumar Pradhan
- Succeeded by: Jyotiraditya Scindia

Member of Parliament, Lok Sabha
- In office 16 May 2004 – 16 May 2009
- Preceded by: Hukmdev Narayan Yadav
- Succeeded by: Hukmdev Narayan Yadav
- Constituency: Madhubani
- In office 10 March 1998 – 26 April 1999
- Preceded by: Chaturanan Mishra
- Succeeded by: Hukmdev Narayan Yadav
- Constituency: Madhubani

President of Bihar Pradesh Congress Committee
- In office 2000–2003
- Preceded by: Chandan Bagchi
- Succeeded by: Ramjatan Sinha

Minister of Health Government of Bihar
- In office 11 March 2000 – 6 March 2005
- Chief Minister: Rabri Devi
- Preceded by: Dr. Mahaveer Prasad
- Succeeded by: Shakuni Choudhury

Member of the Bihar Legislative Assembly
- In office 5 March 1985 – 28 March 1995
- Preceded by: Raj Kumar Purbe
- Succeeded by: Ramchandra Yadav
- Constituency: Bisfi
- In office 11 March 2000 – 6 March 2005
- Preceded by: Ramchandra Yadav
- Succeeded by: Haribhushan Thakur
- Constituency: Bisfi

Personal details
- Born: 2 January 1956 (age 70) Madhubani, Bihar, India
- Party: Indian National Congress (1985-2025)
- Relations: Ahmad Ghafoor
- Parent(s): Shakoor Ahmad, Hajra Khatoon
- Education: S.K. Medical College, Muzaffarpur Bihar
- As of 26 September, 2006

Shakeel Ahmad (born 2 January 1956) was a member of the 12th and 14th Lok Sabha of India, along with serving as a cabinet minister in the government of Bihar and leading the Bihar Pradesh Congress Committee. He was also general secretary of the Indian National Congress (INC) and a union Minister of State.

== Political career ==
Ahmad was first elected as a member of the Bihar Legislative Assembly in 1985, from the constituency of Bisfi. He was thereafter in 1990 and 2000 from the same constituency. In the Legislative Assembly, he served in the Third Rabri Devi ministry as the state’s Minister of Health. He was elected to Lok Sabha in 1998 and again in 2004, from Madhubani. In his Lok Sabha tenure, he served in the Manmohan Singh ministry as a Union Minister of State for Home Affairs, along with Communications and Information Technology. He was defeated in the 2009 general election by his predecessor Hukmdev Narayan Yadav of the Bharatiya Janata Party.

== See also ==
- List of politicians from Bihar
- Bihar Pradesh Congress Committee
