= Dighiar =

- Village
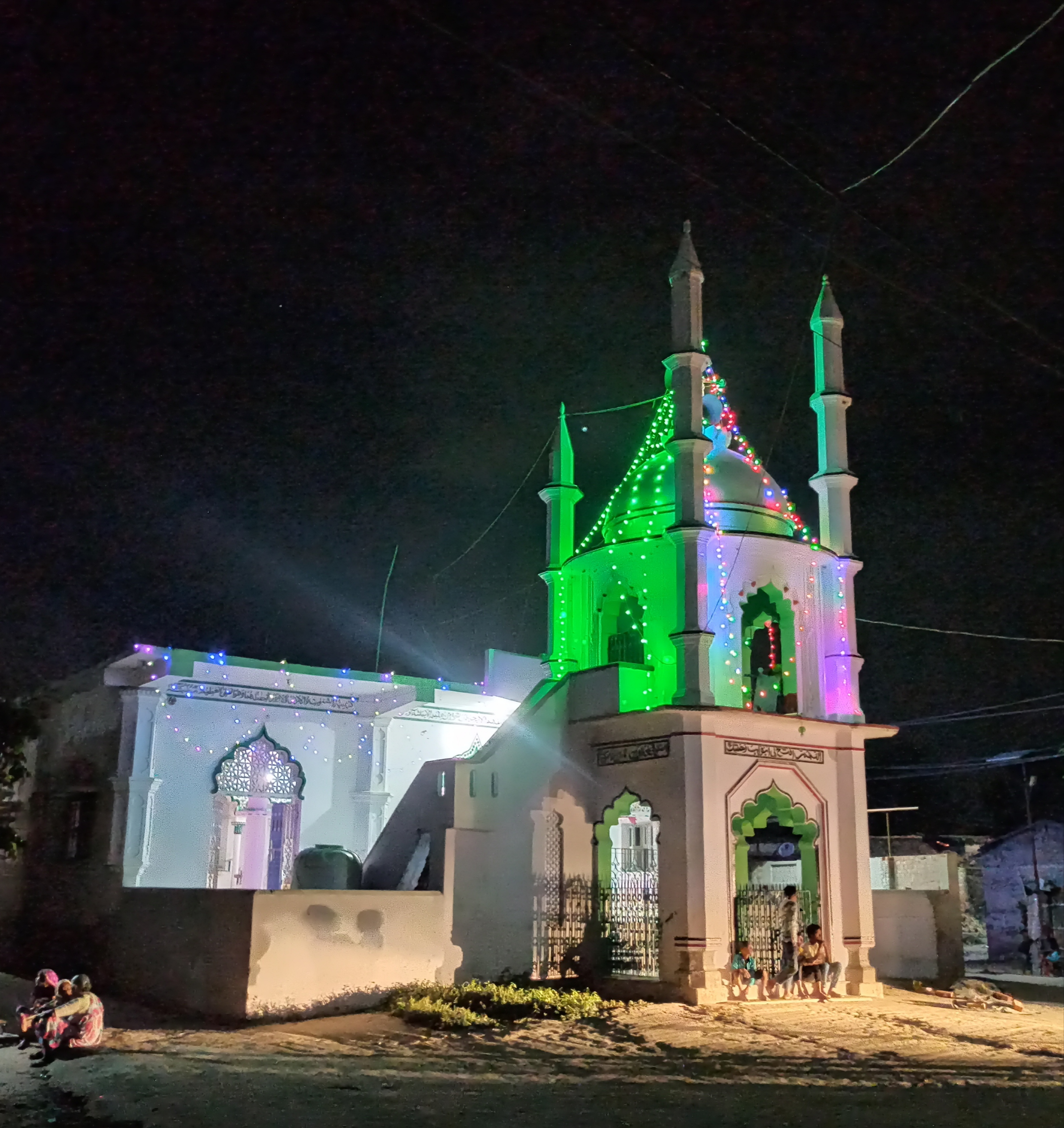

- Location in Bihar, India
- Coordinates: 26°16′20″N 85°56′40″E
- Country: India
- State: Bihar
- Region: Mithila
- District: Darbhanga

Government
  - Body: Panchayati raj

Population (2011)
  - Total: 5,062

Languages
  - Official: Maithili, Urdu, Hindi
- Time zone: UTC+5:30 (IST)
- PIN: 847121
- Nearest city: Darbhanga, Madhubani
- Lok Sabha constituency: Madhubani
- Vidhan Sabha constituency: Keoti
- Panchayat: Dighiar
- Sex ratio: 942 ♂/♀
- Literacy: 47%
- Avg. summer temperature: 42 °C (108 °F)
- Avg. winter temperature: 15 °C (59 °F)

Dighiar is a village in Keotirunway block of Darbhanga district in Bihar, India. This is 15 km from Darbhanga and 19 km from Madhubani city.

The name Dighiar came because of its location on the bank of a big pond (Badh Pokhar) which means side of a pond.

== Languages ==
The official languages of this village are Urdu, Hindi, and English.

== Constituency ==
This village comes under the Keoti assembly constituency and the Madhubani Lok Sabha constituency.

== Panchayat ==
Dighiar has its own panchayat named Dighiar panchayat, which is the smallest panchayat in Darbhanga district.

== Nearest city ==
The nearest cities are Darbhanga and Madhubani.

== Population ==
The population in Dighiar village is 5,062 as per the 2011 Census by the Indian government.

- There are 993 households in Dighiar.
- There are 2,680 males; there are 2,382 females.

Further, the children below 6 years of age are 1,027 in number of which 550 are males and 477 are females. The total number of Scheduled Caste members is 652 and that of Scheduled Tribe members is 3. Dighiar Literacy Rate Literates are 2,152 of which males are 1,294 and Females are 858. There are 2,910 illiterate people. Dighiar Workers Population Workers in the State of Dighiar are calculated as 1,384 of which 1,299 are males and 85 are females. Further 86 are regular and 1,298 are irregular i.e. get jobs only a few days in a month. There are 3,678 non-workers (including students, housewives, and children above 6 years.)

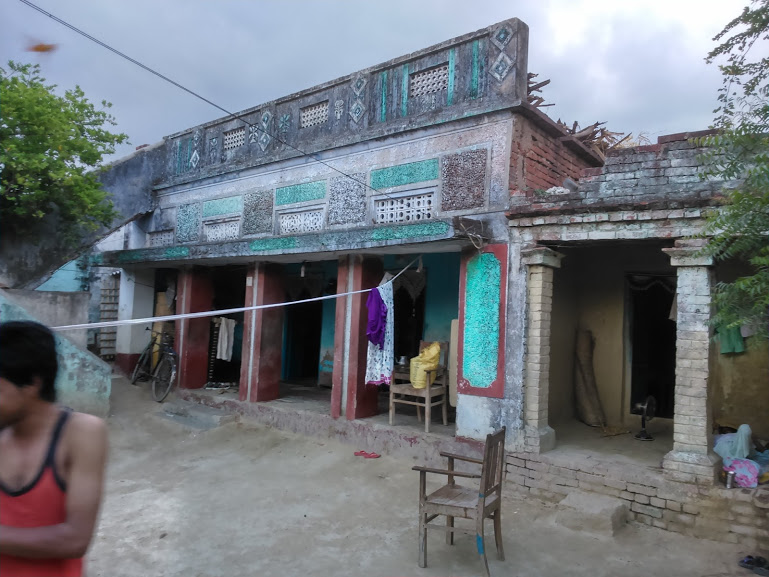
Badrul Hoda Manzil Dighiar

== Education and occupation ==
The literacy rate of the village is 47.01% compared to the literacy rate of the state 47%. The female literacy rate is 35.36% compared to the male literacy rate of 58.36%. The total working population is 33.07% of the total population. 61.07% of the men work while only 4.35% of women work here. The main working population is 28.13% of the total population. 52.63% of the men are the main working population. 2.99% of the women are the main working population. While the marginal working population is 4.95% of the total population. 8.44% of the men are the marginal working population. 1.36% of the women are marginal working population. The total non-working population is 66.93% of the total population. 38.93% of men and 95.65% of women do not work.

== Schools and institutions ==
=== Madarsa Baitul Uloom ===
Madarsa Baitul Uloom was established in the year 1973. It is managed by the Dept. of Education. The school is a P + UP & Sec/H.Sec school. The coeducation status is co-educational. The total number of students is 445. The medium of instruction is Urdu. There are four classrooms and one teacher.

== Economics ==
Agriculture is the prime source of income for the villagers. Major crops of Dighiar are rice, wheat, mustard, murwa, and masoor. Mango is produced widely in the village.

== Lohia sawachh Bihar ==
This village has been declared an "open defecation-free village", as every house in the village has its own toilet.

== Weather ==
Climate data for Dighiar
Month	Jan	Feb	Mar	Apr	May	Jun	Jul	Aug	Sep	Oct	Nov	Dec	Year
Record high °C (°F)	30.4 (86.7)	33.9 (93.0)	39.9 (103.8)	42.0 (107.6)	41.9 (107.4)	43.4 (110.1)	39.1 (102.4)	38.4 (101.1)	39.6 (103.3)	39.2 (102.6)	33.9 (93.0)	29.9 (85.8)	43.4 (110.1)
Mean daily maximum °C (°F)	22.1 (71.8)	25.8 (78.4)	31.0 (87.8)	34.1 (93.4)	35.0 (95.0)	34.9 (94.8)	32.5 (90.5)	32.8 (91.0)	32.5 (90.5)	31.6 (88.9)	28.0 (82.4)	24.8 (76.6)	30.68 (87.22)
Mean daily minimum °C (°F)	9.2 (48.6)	11.0 (51.8)	15.1 (59.2)	19.1 (66.4)	21.2 (70.2)	22.9 (73.2)	23.8 (74.8)	24.2 (75.6)	23.8 (74.8)	21.2 (70.2)	15.8 (60.4)	10.6 (51.1)	18.18 (64.72)
Record low °C (°F)	−0.2 (31.6)	−0.2 (31.6)	3.9 (39.0)	9.2 (48.6)	10.4 (50.7)	15.9 (60.6)	18.7 (65.7)	19.4 (66.9)	18.9 (66.0)	12.7 (54.9)	7.2 (45.0)	2.4 (36.3)	−0.2 (31.6)
Average precipitation mm (inches)	13.0 (0.51)	14.0 (0.55)	9.0 (0.35)	29.0 (1.14)	76.0 (2.99)	139.0 (5.47)	353.0 (13.90)	254.0 (10.00)	193.0 (7.60)	73.0 (2.87)	6.0 (0.24)	7.0 (0.28)	1,166 (45.9)
Average rainy days	1.6	1.7	1.6	2.6	4.6	7.6	16.4	12.2	10.5	3.4	0.5	1.0	63.7
Average relative humidity (%)	68	63	49	56	60	70	78	79	79	73	66	67	67
