= Faraz Fatmi =

Indian politician (born 1982)

Member of the Bihar Legislative Assembly
- In office 2015–2020
- Preceded by: Ashok Kumar Yadav
- Succeeded by: Murari Mohan Jha
- Constituency: Keoti

Personal details
- Born: October 3, 1982 (age 43) Darbhanga, Bihar, India
- Party: RJD
- Spouse: Fatima Rashid Shaikh
- Parent: Mohammad Ali Ashraf Fatmi (father)
- Occupation: Politician
- Website: fatmi.in

Faraz Fatmi is an Indian politician belonging to Rashtriya Janata Dal. He was elected as a member of Bihar Legislative Assembly from Keoti in 2015.

== Early life ==
Faraz Fatmi was born in Patna on 3 October 1982. He finished his primary and secondary education from DPS Vasant Kunj, New Delhi. Later he pursued MBBS from Deccan Medical college, Hyderabad. For his Master's degree in Hospital Administration, he shifted to London for two years. Fatmi has been an ardent fan of football and cricket all his life.

== Political life ==
He was only 26 years old when he contested his first Legislative Assembly Election in 2010 from Keoti, Darbhanga. Despite support from his constituency, he lost to Ashok Kumar Yadav by 28 votes. Bihar Legislative Assembly election of 2015 proved better for him as he won by 7000 votes from the same constituency.

He left the Rashtriya Janata Dal on in August 2020 and on the same day, he joined Janata Dal (United) in the presence of cabinet minister Bijendra Prasad Yadav.

== Family ==
Born to a political family, Faraz is the son of former HRD Minister, Mohammad Ali Ashraf Fatmi and Shireen Tasneem. He has two younger sisters based in New Delhi.

He married Dr. Fathma Rashid Sheikh in 2008 in Baliya, Uttar Pradesh. They have a son and daughter together. His maternal grandfather, Dr. Hussnain Raza Rizvi is still known for his contribution to the Orthopaedic Department in PMCH.

His paternal grandfather was a civil lawyer in Darbhanga who also contested in the legislative assembly elections but unfortunately lost. Fatmi family is one of the most known families of Bihar for their contribution to social welfare and community building.
