= Nellai R. Jebamani =

Indian politician

Member of the Tamil Nadu Legislative Assembly
- In office 1977–1980
- Preceded by: K. P. Kandasamy
- Succeeded by: S. N. Ramasamy
- Constituency: Sathankulam

Personal details
- Born: 19 February 1919
- Died: 14 July 2000 (aged 81)
- Party: Indian National Congress (Organisation) (1969-1977); Janata Party (1977-2000)
- Children: Jebamani Mohanraj (son)

Nellai R. Jebamani (19 February 1919- 14 July 2000) was an Indian politician and former Member of the Legislative Assembly who was the staunch supporter of K. Kamaraj, former CM. He was elected to the Tamil Nadu legislative assembly as a Janata Party candidate from Sathankulam constituency in 1977 election.

Jebamani has a son named Mohanraj, who became a politician and founded the Jebamani Janata Party, naming it after Jebamani.
