= K. T. Kosalram =

Indian politician (1915–1985)

Member of Legislative Assembly
- In office 1952–1957
- Succeeded by: S. P. Adithanar
- Constituency: Sathankulam
- In office 1962–1967
- Preceded by: S. P. Adithanar
- Succeeded by: Martin
- Constituency: Sathankulam

Member of Lok Sabha
- In office 1977–1980
- In office 1980–1984
- In office 1984–1985
- Preceded by: M. S. Sivasamy
- Succeeded by: R. Dhanuskodi Athithan
- Constituency: Tiruchendur

Personal details
- Born: 22 December 1915 Arumuganeri, Madras Presidency; British India
- Died: 27 January 1985 (aged 69) New Delhi
- Party: INC
- Spouse(s): Gomathi Devi; Saroja
- Children: K T K Subash; K T K Mohan Ram; K T K Ashokan; K T K Jamuna; K T K Aruna; K T K Jawahar; K T K Thoosimuthu; K T K Indra
- As of 14 February, 2018

K. T. Kosalram (1915-1985) was an Indian politician. He was also a freedom fighter and a congressman. He owned Dina Sethi, a newspaper from Purasawakkam, Chennai.

== Early life and freedom struggle ==
K. T. Kosalram was born in 1915 and played a significant role in India's struggle for independence. He actively participated in the Civil Disobedience Movement in 1932 and the Quit India Movement in 1942. Kosalram was notably involved in the burning of the Kurumbur Railway Station during the 1942 uprisings, an act for which he was arrested, sentenced, and imprisoned. He served as the secretary of the Tirunelveli District Satyagraha Committee.

== Political career ==
Kosalram's political career began with his service as a Member of the then composite Madras State Legislative Assembly from 1946 to 1956, followed by his tenure in the Tamil Nadu Legislative Council from 1957 to 1962. He continued his legislative service as a Member of the Tamil Nadu Legislative Assembly from 1962 to 1967. Later, he was a member of Lok Sabha elected from Tiruchendur constituency in the 1977, 1980 and 1984 elections.

== Contributions and legacy ==
In addition to his political roles, Kosalram organized the first Rehabilitation Centre for Sri Lankan repatriates at Nazareth in 1954. He also owned and operated Dina Sethi, a newspaper based in Purasawakkam, Chennai.

== Honors and recognition ==
A school in Tuticorin has been named in his honor, as well as the Sathankulam Bus Stand. In recognition of his centenary year, a special cover was released on 19 May 2015, in Tuticorin to celebrate his legacy.
