= Shafiqullah Ansari =

Indian politician

Member of Parliament, Lok Sabha
- In office 1980
- Preceded by: Hukmdev Narayan Yadav
- Succeeded by: Bhogendra Jha
- Constituency: Madhubani, Bihar

Personal details
- Party: Indian National Congress

Shafiqullah Ansari is an Indian politician. He was elected to the lower House of the Indian Parliament the Lok Sabha as a member of the Indian National Congress.
