= Abdul Hannan Ansari =

Indian politician (1927–1998)

Member of Parliament, Lok Sabha
- In office 1984–1989
- Preceded by: Bhogendra Jha
- Succeeded by: Bhogendra Jha
- Constituency: Madhubani, Bihar

Personal details
- Born: 1927
- Died: 26 November 1998 (aged 71) Madhubani, India
- Party: Indian National Congress

Abdul Hannan Ansari (1927 – 26 November 1998) was an Indian politician. He was elected to the Lok Sabha (the Lower House of the Indian Parliament), as a member of the Indian National Congress.

Ansari died in Madhubani on 26 November 1998, at the age of 71.
