= Shiva Chandra Jha =

Indian politician (1929–1989)

Member of parliament, Lok Sabha
- In office 1967–1971
- Preceded by: Yogendra Jha
- Succeeded by: Jagannath Mishra
- Constituency: Madhubani, Bihar

Personal details
- Born: 1 March 1929
- Died: 8 November 1989 (aged 60)
- Party: Samyukta Socialist Party
- Spouse: Nayantara Jha
- Children: 5 daughters, 1 son

Shiva Chandra Jha (1 March 1929 – 8 November 1989) was an Indian politician and independence activist belonging to the Samyukta Socialist Party. He was elected to the lower House of the Indian Parliament the Lok Sabha from Madhubani in Bihar. Jha was also member of Rajya Sabha from 10 April 1978 to 9 April 1984, representing the Janata Party. He died on 8 November 1989, at the age of 60.
