= Keoti Assembly constituency =

Constituency of the Bihar legislative assembly in India

Coordinates: 26°16′26″N 85°56′43″E

- Constituency No. 86 for the Bihar Legislative Assembly

Constituency details
- Country: India
- Region: East India
- State: Bihar
- District: Darbhanga
- Lok Sabha constituency: Madhubani
- Established: 1977
- Total electors: 298,961
- Reservation: None

Member of Legislative Assembly
- 18th Bihar Legislative Assembly
- Incumbent Murari Mohan Jha
- Party: BJP
- Alliance: NDA
- Elected year: 2025

Keoti (Assembly constituency) is an assembly constituency in Darbhanga district in the Indian state of Bihar.

== Overview ==
As per Delimitation of Parliamentary and Assembly constituencies Order, 2008, No. 86 Keoti Assembly constituency is composed of the following: Keoti community development block; Arai Birdipur, Banauli, Bharathi, Bharhulli, Hariharpur East, Hariharpur West, Harpur, Madhopur Basatwara, Kaligaon, Sadhwara, Dighiar, Tektar and Simri gram panchayats of Singhwara CD Block.

Keoti Assembly constituency is part of No. 6 Madhubani (Lok Sabha constituency).

== Members of the Legislative Assembly ==
Year	Name	Party
1977	Durgadas Thakur	Janata Party
1980	Shamaele Nabi	Indian National Congress
1985	Kalim Ahmad	Indian National Congress
1990	Ghulam Sarwar	Janata Dal
1995	Ghulam Sarwar	Janata Dal
2000	Ghulam Sarwar	Rashtriya Janata Dal
2005	Ashok Kumar Yadav	Bharatiya Janata Party
2005	Ashok Kumar Yadav	Bharatiya Janata Party
2010	Ashok Kumar Yadav	Bharatiya Janata Party
2015	Faraz Fatmi	Rashtriya Janata Dal
2020	Murari Mohan Jha	Bharatiya Janata Party
2025	Murari Mohan Jha	Bharatiya Janata Party

== Election results ==
=== 2025 ===
2025 Bihar Legislative Assembly election: Keoti
Party	Candidate	Votes	%	±%
BJP	Murari Mohan Jha	89,123	46.28	−0.47
RJD	Faraz Fatmi	81,818	42.48	−1.13
AIMIM	Mohammad Anisur Rahman	7,474	3.88	
JSP	Biltu Sahani	4,816	2.5	
Independent	Dhirendra Kumar Dheeraj	3,895	2.02	
NOTA	None of the above	2,454	1.27	−0.55
Majority		7,305	3.8	+0.66
Turnout		192,588	64.42	+8.02
BJP hold		Swing	NDA	

=== 2020 ===
Bihar Legislative Assembly Election, 2020: Keoti
Party	Candidate	Votes	%	±%
BJP	Murari Mohan Jha	76,372	46.75	+4.99
RJD	Abdul Bari Siddiqui	71,246	43.61	−3.53
Independent	Yogesh Ranjan	3,304	2.02	
Samajwadi Janata Dal Democratic	Faiyazur Rahman	1,528	0.94	
NOTA	None of the above	2,968	1.82	−0.59
Majority		5,126	3.14	−2.24
Turnout		163,361	56.4	+1.8
BJP gain from RJD		Swing		

=== 2015 ===
Bihar Assembly election, 2015: Keoti
Party	Candidate	Votes	%	±%
RJD	Faraz Fatmi	68,601	47.14	
BJP	Ashok Kumar Yadav	60,771	41.76	
CPI	Ram Chandra Sah	2,176	1.5	
The National Road Map Party of India	Md. Faiyaz Khan	2,001	1.38	
NCP	Chand Babu Rehman	1,649	1.13	
Independent	Vijay Kumar	1,587	1.09	
NOTA	None of the above	3,513	2.41	
Majority		7,830	5.38	
Turnout		145,527	54.6	
