= Rani Venkatesan =

Indian politician

Member of Tamil Nadu Legislative Assembly
- In office 12 May 2006 – 14 May 2011
- Preceded by: Neelamega Varnan
- Succeeded by: Constituency abolished
- Constituency: Sathankulam

Personal details
- Party: Indian National Congress

Rani Venkatesan is an Indian politician and a past Member of the Legislative Assembly from Sathankulam Constituency. She was elected to the Tamil Nadu legislative assembly as an Indian National Congress candidate from Sathankulam constituency in 2006 election. She was married to director general of police L.N. Venkatesan until his death in 2020.
