= Hukmdev Narayan Yadav =

Indian politician

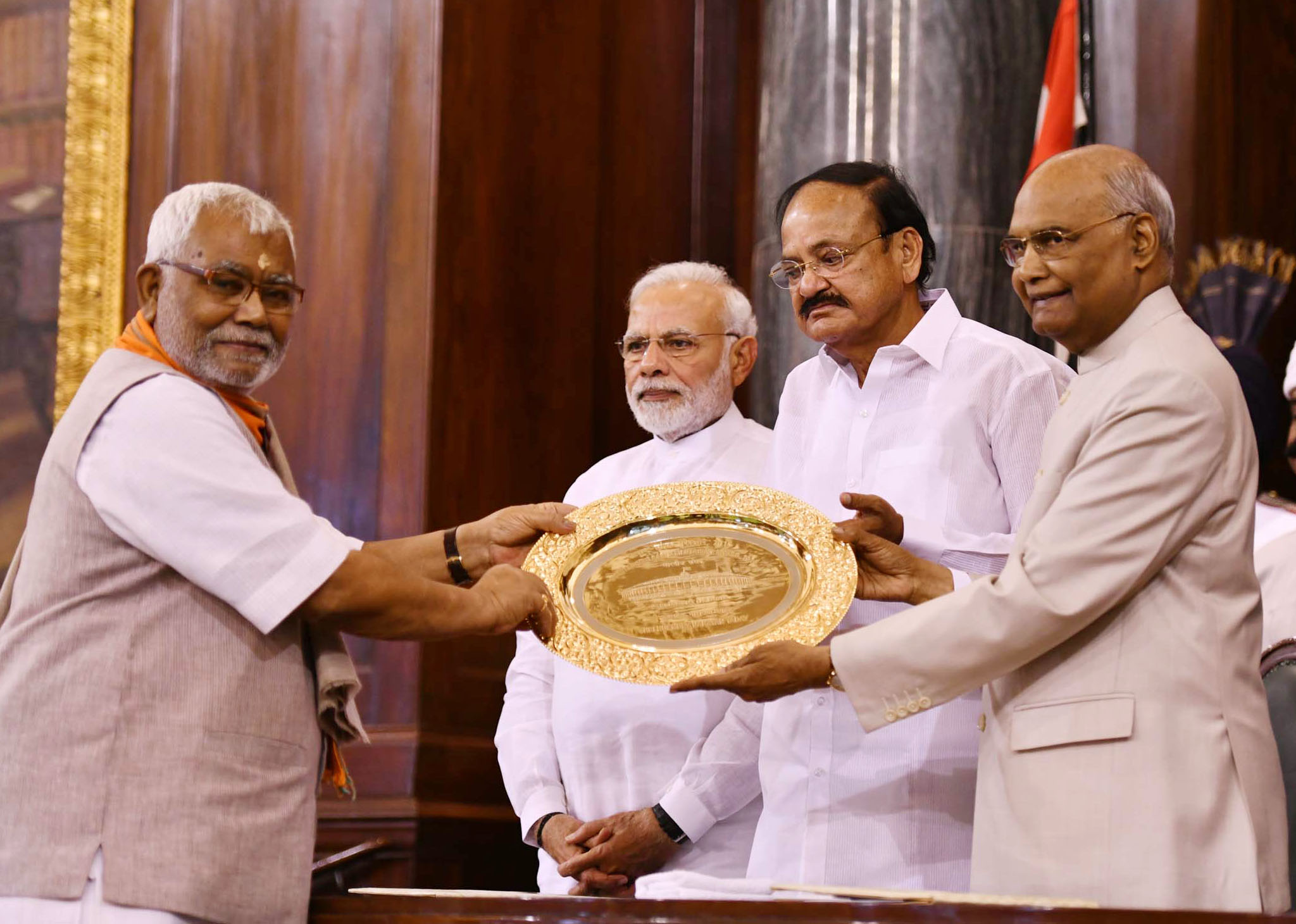
- Yadav receiving the Outstanding Parliamentarian Award in 2018.

Union Minister for Textiles
- In office 21 November 1990 – 21 June 1991
- Prime Minister: Chandra Shekhar
- Preceded by: Sharad Yadav
- Succeeded by: Ashok Gehlot

Union Minister of State for Agriculture
- In office 2 November 2001 – 22 May 2004
- Prime Minister: Atal Bihari Vajpayee
- Preceded by: Shripad Naik
- Succeeded by: Kantilal Bhuria
- In office 13 October 1999 – 27 May 2000
- Prime Minister: Atal Bihari Vajpayee
- Preceded by: Sompal Shastri
- Succeeded by: Syed Shahnawaz Hussain

Union Minister of State for Shipping
- In office 7 November 2000 – 2 November 2001
- Prime Minister: Atal Bihari Vajpayee
- Preceded by: Office established
- Succeeded by: Shripad Naik

Union Minister of State for Surface Transport
- In office 27 May 2000 – 2 November 2001
- Prime Minister: Atal Bihari Vajpayee
- Preceded by: Debendra Pradhan
- Succeeded by: Shripad Naik

Member of Parliament, Rajya Sabha
- In office 7 July 1980 – 6 July 1986
- Constituency: Bihar

Member of Parliament, Lok Sabha
- In office 16 May 2009 — 23 May 2019
- Succeeded by: Ashok Kumar Yadav
- Constituency: Madhubani
- In office 6 October 1999 — 16 May 2004
- Preceded by: Shakeel Ahmad
- Succeeded by: Shakeel Ahmad
- Constituency: Madhubani
- In office 2 December 1989 – 13 March 1991
- Preceded by: Ram Shreshth Khirhar
- Succeeded by: Nawal Kishore Rai
- Constituency: Sitamarhi
- In office 23 March 1977 – 22 August 1979
- Preceded by: Bhogendra Jha
- Succeeded by: Shafiqullah Ansari
- Constituency: Madhubani

Personal details
- Born: 17 November 1939 (age 86) Bijuli, Darbhanga
- Citizenship: India
- Party: Bharatiya Janata Party
- Other party: Samyukta Socialist Party; Bharatiya Lok Dal; Janata Party; Janata Dal; Samajwadi Janata Party (Rashtriya)
- Spouse: Sudesh Yadav
- Children: 3 including Ashok Kumar Yadav
- Education: Graduate
- Alma mater: Chandradhari Mithila College
- Occupation: Politician and Agriculturist
- Awards: Padma Bhushan

Hukmdev Narayan Yadav (born 17 November 1939) is a politician from Bihar, who has been Union Minister for Textiles, whilst also serving as a Union Minister of State and long-serving influential member of the Lok Sabha. He is the recipient of Padma Bhushan India's third highest civilian award. He represented the Madhubani constituency of Bihar in 1977, 1999, 2009, 2014 and 1989 from Sitamarhi Lok Sabha constituency. He was with the Samyukta Socialist Party in 1960s and various faces of Janata Dal and its off-shoots in 1980s, before he joined the Bharatiya Janata Party. Yadav is known for his fiery speeches in the parliament. In August 2018, Yadav was recipient of Outstanding Parliamentarian Award for the period of 2014-2017 and was felicitated at an event at the central hall of Parliament. Yadav is also the father of politician Ashok Kumar Yadav, a Bharatiya Janata Party MP in the Lok Sabha.

== Education and background ==
Yadav is a Graduate. An agriculturist by profession, he is also a political figure and a social worker. Along with Indranath Jha (commonly known as indu master ) of Damodarpur (Benipatti), Yadav was very active in BJP outreach in Madhubani; after the death of Indranath Jha, he took all the responsibility.

== Posts held ==
#	From	To	Position
01	1960	1968	Gram Pradhan, Bijuli Panchayat (two terms)
02	1965	1967	President, Prakhand Panchayat Samiti, Darbhanga
03	1967	1967	Member, Bihar Legislative Assembly
04	1967	1967	Member, Public Accounts Committee, Rules Committee and Committee on Petitions
05	1967	1967	Chief Whip, Sanyukt Socialist Party (SANSOPA), Bihar Legislative Assembly
06	1969	1969	Member, Bihar Legislative Assembly
07	1969	1969	Member, Public Accounts Committee, Rules Committee and Committee on Petitions
08	1969	1969	Chief Whip, Sanyukt Socialist Party (SANSOPA), Bihar Legislative Assembly
09	1972	1972	Member, Bihar Legislative Assembly
10	1972	1972	Member, Public Accounts Committee, Rules Committee and Committee on Petitions
11	1972	1972	Chief Whip, Sanyukt Socialist Party (SANSOPA), Bihar Legislative Assembly
12	1971	1971	President, Zila Parishad (District Board)
13	1972	1972	President, Sanyukt Socialist Party (SANSOPA), Darbhanga
14	1974	1977	General Secretary, Bharatiya Lok Dal, Bihar
15	1977	1979	Member of 6th Lok Sabha, Madhubani (Lok Sabha constituency)
16	1977	1979	General Secretary, Janata Party, Bihar
17	1977	1979	Secretary, Parliamentary Committee, Bihar
18	1980	1980	Elected to Rajya Sabha
19	1980	1986	Chief Whip, Lok Dal, Rajya Sabha
20	1980	1986	President, Election Committee, Lok Dal, Bihar
21	1982	1984	Deputy Leader, Rajya Sabha
22	1983	1983	National General Secretary, Janata Party
23	1983	1984	Member, Committee on the Welfare of Scheduled Castes and Scheduled Tribes
24	1985	1986	Member, Committee on Official Language
25	1985	1988	President, Janata Party, Bihar
26	1989	-	Re-elected to 9th Lok Sabha (2nd term) Sitamarhi (Lok Sabha constituency)
27	1989	1990	Member, Business Advisory Committee
28	1990	1990	Member, Committee on Public Undertakings, Consultative Committee & Ministry of Finance
29	1990	1990	Deputy leader, Janata Dal, Lok Sabha
30	1990	1991	Union Cabinet Minister, Textiles and Food Processing Industries
31	1999	-	Re-elected to 13th Lok Sabha (3rd term) Madhubani (Lok Sabha constituency)
32	1999	2000	Union Minister of State, Agriculture
33	2000	2000	Union Minister of State, Surface Transport
34	2000	2001	Union Minister of State, Shipping
35	2001	-	Union Minister of State, Agriculture
36	2009	2014	Re-elected to 15th Lok Sabha (4th term), Madhubani (Lok Sabha constituency)
37	2009	2014	Member, Committee on Agriculture
38	2009	2014	Member, Committee on Government Assurances
39	2009	2014	Member, Committee on Official Language
40	2009	2014	Member, Consultative Committee, Urban Development
41	2014	2019	Re-elected to 16th Lok Sabha (5th term), Madhubani (Lok Sabha constituency)

== See also ==
- List of members of the 15th Lok Sabha of India
