= Chaturanan Mishra =

Indian politician

Minister of Agriculture & Farmers Welfare, Government of India
- In office 10 July 1996 – 19 March 1998
- Prime Minister: H. D. Deve Gowda; I. K. Gujral
- Preceded by: H. D. Deve Gowda
- Succeeded by: Atal Bihari Vajpayee

Member of Parliament, Lok Sabha
- In office 10 May 1996 – 5 March 1998
- Preceded by: Bhogendra Jha
- Succeeded by: Shakeel Ahmad
- Constituency: Madhubani

Member of Parliament of Rajya Sabha for Bihar
- In office 1984–1996

Personal details
- Born: 7 April 1925 Nahar, Madhubani District, Bihar
- Died: July 2, 2011 (aged 86)
- Party: Communist Party of India
- Occupation: Politician; Indian freedom fighter

Chaturanan Mishra (7 April 1925 – 2 July 2011) was an Indian politician and trade unionist. Mishra, who was born in Nahar, Madhubani District, was a key leader of the Communist Party of India in Bihar, and served as the Agriculture Minister of India in the United Front government.

He was the founder general secretary of the Kedar Das Institute for Labour and Social Studies.

== Quit India Movement ==
Mishra took part in the 1942 Quit India Movement. Due to his pro-Independence activism, he had to go into exile in Nepal for a period. Back in India, he was imprisoned at Darbhanga jail.

== 1962–1980 ==
He contested the Giridih seat in the 1962 Bihar Legislative Assembly election, finishing second with 6,379 votes.

Mishra joined the National Council of the Communist Party of India in 1964. He became the president of the Bihar State Committee of the All India Trade Union Congress.

Between 1969 and 1980 he was a Member of the Legislative Assembly of Bihar, representing the Giridih seat. He led the CPI faction in the Legislative Assembly for ten years. During this period he was referred to as 'the backbone of CPI in Bihar'. Madhubani, Mishra's home turf, got the nickname 'Leningrad of Bihar'. Mishra also served as president of the World Miners Association for a period.

Mishra contested the Hazaribagh seat in the 1977 Lok Sabha election. He finished third with 35,809 votes (12.45%).

== 1980s ==
He was defeated by Urmila Devi of the Congress (I) in a 1981 by-election (the 1980 election had been suspended following the death of Congress (I) candidate Randhir Prasad, Urmila Devi's husband). Mishra's candidature had been supported by the CPI(M), RSP and Lok Dal.

During the 1980s, Mishra became the president of the All India Trade Union Congress. In 1984 he was elected to the Rajya Sabha.

In April 1989, he was included in the party secretariat of CPI.

In 1990, he was again elected to the Rajya Sabha.

== Union Minister ==
Mishra was elected to the Lok Sabha in the 1996 election from the Madhubani constituency with 282,194 votes. His candidature had been supported by Janata Dal. After the election he became Union Minister for Agriculture, a position he would hold until 1998. Mishra was one of the two (along with Indrajit Gupta) first communist Union Ministers in Indian history. In May 1997 he also overtook the portfolios of Food, Civil Supplies, Consumer Affairs and Public Distribution as Union Minister.

In 1998 Mishra was excluded from the CPI secretariat. Officially health factors were claimed as the rationale behind his exclusion, but the press speculated that the move was motivated by Mishra's opposition on the position of the party in opposing the introduction of President's Rule in Bihar.

Mishra died in New Delhi at the All India Institute of Medical Sciences at the age of 86.
