= Yogendra Jha =

Indian politician (born 1931)

Member of Parliament, Lok Sabha
- In office 1962-1967
- Preceded by: Anirudha Sinha
- Succeeded by: Shiva Chandra Jha
- Constituency: Madhubani, Bihar

Personal details
- Born: 1931 Jhitaki Village
- Party: Praja Socialist Party
- Spouse: Tillottama Devi
- Children: 3 Sons

Yogendra Jha (born 1931) was an Indian politician belonging to the Praja Socialist Party. He was elected to the lower House of the Indian Parliament the Lok Sabha from Madhubani in Bihar.
