= Sathankulam Assembly constituency =

One of the 234 State Legislative Assembly Constituencies in Tamil Nadu, in India

Coordinates: 8.44°N 77.91°E

Sathankulam
- Former constituency for the Tamil Nadu Legislative Assembly

Constituency details
- Country: India
- Region: South India
- State: Tamil Nadu
- District: Thoothukudi
- Lok Sabha constituency: Tiruchendur
- Established: 1951
- Abolished: 2008
- Total electors: 1,30,239
- Reservation: None

Sathankulam was an assembly constituency located in Thoothukudi district in Tamil Nadu. It fell under Tiruchendur Lok Sabha constituency. It was one of the 234 State Legislative Assembly Constituencies in Tamil Nadu, in India.

== Members of the Legislative Assembly ==
Year	Winner	Party
Madras State
1952	K. T. Kosalram	Independent
1957	S. P. Adithanar	Independent
1962	K. T. Kosalram	Indian National Congress
1967	Martin	Indian National Congress
Tamil Nadu
1971	K. P. Kandasamy	Dravida Munnetra Kazhagam
1977	R. Jebamani	Janata Party
1980	S. N. Ramasamy	Gandhi Kamaraj National Congress
1984	S. N. Ramasamy	Gandhi Kamaraj National Congress
1989	Kumari Ananthan	Indian National Congress
1991	Kumari Ananthan	Indian National Congress
1996	S. S. Mani Nadar	Tamil Maanila Congress
2001	S. S. Mani Nadar	Tamil Maanila Congress
2003	Neelamega Varnam	All India Anna Dravida Munnetra Kazhagam
2006	Rani Venkatesan	Indian National Congress

== Election results ==
=== 2006 ===
2006 Tamil Nadu Legislative Assembly election: Sattangulam
Party	Candidate	Votes	%	±%
INC	Rani Venkatesan	45,446	52.22%	
MDMK	P. Nazareth Durai	29,938	34.40%	
DMDK	V. Diamond Raja	3,827	4.40%	
AIFB	S. Muthu Ramalingam	2,867	3.29%	
BJP	T. Siva Subramanian	1,883	2.16%	−39.81%
BSP	M. Thangaraj	1,544	1.77%	
Independent	J. Jesubaskar	582	0.67%	
Independent	S. Ponpandi	280	0.32%	
Independent	T. Micheal Antony Ainrose	184	0.21%	
Independent	P. Balakrishnan	182	0.21%	
Independent	P. Sugumaran	162	0.19%	
Margin of victory		15,508	17.82%	10.38%
Turnout		87,035	66.83%	21.54%
Registered electors		1,30,239		
INC gain from TMC(M)		Swing	2.80%	

=== 2002 by-election ===
Source: ECI
Election was necessitated due to death of S.S. Mani Nadar.

2002–03 Tamil Nadu Legislative Assembly by-elections: Sathankulam
Party	Candidate	Votes	%	±%
AIADMK	L. Neelamegavarnam	56,945	57.0%	
INC	A. Mahendran	39,453	39.0%	
Majority		17,492	18.0%	n/a
Turnout		100,446	64.8%	n/a
AIADMK gain from TMC(M)		Swing		

=== 2001 ===
2001 Tamil Nadu Legislative Assembly election: Sattangulam
Party	Candidate	Votes	%	±%
TMC(M)	S. S. Mani Nadar	38,308	49.42%	−5.10%
BJP	A. N. Rajakkannan	32,542	41.98%	32.36%
Independent	B. Stalin	2,600	3.35%	
Independent	D. Emi	2,079	2.68%	
JD(S)	R. J. Paul	709	0.91%	
Independent	R. Santhakumar	362	0.47%	
Independent	M. B. Jayaprakash Narayanan	247	0.32%	
Independent	I. Johnjebaraj	220	0.28%	
Independent	P. Esakkimuthunadar	166	0.21%	
Independent	T. Augustine Ebenezer	161	0.21%	
Independent	M. Pandi	127	0.16%	
Margin of victory		5,766	7.44%	−23.56%
Turnout		77,521	45.28%	−8.46%
Registered electors		171,481		
TMC(M) hold		Swing	-5.10%	

=== 1996 ===
1996 Tamil Nadu Legislative Assembly election: Sattangulam
Party	Candidate	Votes	%	±%
TMC(M)	S. S. Mani Nadar	44,376	54.51%	
INC	B. Kasi Anantham	19,140	23.51%	−48.58%
BJP	G. S. Rajagopal	7,832	9.62%	
KNMK	R. M. Shanmughanathan	4,738	5.82%	
JD	P. S. Siva Subramanian	3,005	3.69%	
Independent	I. Gopalasamy	968	1.19%	
ATMK	T. Jegadeesan	496	0.61%	
Independent	V. Paramasivan	184	0.23%	
Independent	T. Rathnakar	126	0.15%	
Independent	A. Sundar @ Rajeswaran	81	0.10%	
Independent	M. A. Krishnapandian	80	0.10%	
Margin of victory		25,236	31.00%	−17.99%
Turnout		81,403	53.75%	5.91%
Registered electors		157,799		
TMC(M) gain from INC		Swing	-17.58%	

=== 1991 ===
1991 Tamil Nadu Legislative Assembly election: Sattangulam
Party	Candidate	Votes	%	±%
INC	Kumari Ananthan	52,719	72.09%	43.44%
JD	M. A. Ganesa Pandiyan	16,894	23.10%	
JP	P. Thalavan	2,596	3.55%	
THMM	K. Sivasubbu	309	0.42%	
PMK	V. Ulagu	193	0.26%	
Independent	Soosai Gurunathan	179	0.24%	
Independent	R. Jebamani	134	0.18%	
Independent	David Rajaya	106	0.14%	
Margin of victory		35,825	48.99%	47.61%
Turnout		73,130	47.84%	−16.32%
Registered electors		156,063		
INC hold		Swing	43.44%	

=== 1989 ===
1989 Tamil Nadu Legislative Assembly election: Sattangulam
Party	Candidate	Votes	%	±%
INC	Kumari Ananthan	24,913	28.65%	
DMK	P. Durai Raj	23,717	27.27%	
AIADMK	S. R. Subramania Athithan	20,127	23.14%	
Independent	D. G. Jayasingh	13,569	15.60%	
BJP	T. Arasuraja	2,891	3.32%	
Independent	N. Aelvaraj	1,063	1.22%	
India Farmers and Tailers Party	A. V. K. Balasubramanian	217	0.25%	
Independent	T. Pandaram	122	0.14%	
Independent	V. Shanmugam	81	0.09%	
Independent	S. Suriamuthu	77	0.09%	
Independent	T. Ratnam	52	0.06%	
Margin of victory		1,196	1.38%	−10.83%
Turnout		86,968	64.16%	4.80%
Registered electors		137,325		
INC gain from GKC		Swing	-25.05%	

=== 1984 ===
1984 Tamil Nadu Legislative Assembly election: Sattangulam
Party	Candidate	Votes	%	±%
GKC	S. N. Ramasamy	37,892	53.69%	
JP	M. A. Ganesapandian	29,275	41.48%	
Independent	R. Thangarasu	1,431	2.03%	
Independent	Soorimuthu Thevar	597	0.85%	
Independent	V. Ganapathi Andi	516	0.73%	
Independent	Murugesan Alias Durai Murugan	511	0.72%	
Independent	S. T. Jayapal	351	0.50%	
Margin of victory		8,617	12.21%	10.52%
Turnout		70,573	59.36%	10.32%
Registered electors		125,821		
GKC hold		Swing	12.46%	

=== 1980 ===
1980 Tamil Nadu Legislative Assembly election: Sattangulam
Party	Candidate	Votes	%	±%
GKC	S. N. Ramasamy	24,700	41.24%	
INC	R. Dhanuskodi Athithan	23,688	39.55%	14.08%
JP	M. A. Ganesa Pandiyan	10,349	17.28%	
Independent	A. P. Raja Singh	695	1.16%	
Independent	C. Subrammaniam	260	0.43%	
Independent	S. R. Savarimuthu	208	0.35%	
Margin of victory		1,012	1.69%	0.42%
Turnout		59,900	49.04%	−0.69%
Registered electors		123,284		
GKC gain from JP		Swing	13.87%	

=== 1977 ===
1977 Tamil Nadu Legislative Assembly election: Sattangulam
Party	Candidate	Votes	%	±%
JP	R. Jebamani	18,362	27.36%	
Independent	S. P. Adithanar	17,507	26.09%	
INC	M. S. Selvarajan	17,091	25.47%	−18.66%
DMK	D. Nellai Nedumaran	10,879	16.21%	−35.51%
Independent	Syed Shahul Hameed	2,274	3.39%	
Independent	C. Kandiah	988	1.47%	
Margin of victory		855	1.27%	−6.32%
Turnout		67,101	49.72%	−20.81%
Registered electors		136,771		
JP gain from DMK		Swing	-24.36%	

=== 1971 ===
1971 Tamil Nadu Legislative Assembly election: Sattangulam
Party	Candidate	Votes	%	±%
DMK	K. P. Kandasamy	33,510	51.72%	6.45%
INC	T. Martin	28,592	44.13%	−8.38%
Independent	Ramiah	2,687	4.15%	
Margin of victory		4,918	7.59%	0.35%
Turnout		64,789	70.53%	3.38%
Registered electors		97,967		
DMK gain from INC		Swing	-0.79%	

=== 1967 ===
1967 Madras Legislative Assembly election: Sattangulam
Party	Candidate	Votes	%	±%
INC	T. Martin	31,143	52.51%	−15.90%
DMK	S. P. Adithanar	26,846	45.27%	
CPI(M)	S. Poovalingam	1,317	2.22%	
Margin of victory		4,297	7.25%	−33.84%
Turnout		59,306	67.15%	1.35%
Registered electors		91,835		
INC hold		Swing	-15.90%	

=== 1962 ===
1962 Madras Legislative Assembly election: Sattangulam
Party	Candidate	Votes	%	±%
INC	K. T. Kosalram	43,428	68.42%	29.92%
We Tamils	A. P. Rajsingh	17,351	27.33%	
SWA	K. Selladurai Valllikutti	2,698	4.25%	
Margin of victory		26,077	41.08%	21.85%
Turnout		63,477	65.80%	8.25%
Registered electors		98,249		
INC gain from Independent		Swing	10.68%	

=== 1957 ===
1957 Madras Legislative Assembly election: Sattangulam
Party	Candidate	Votes	%	±%
Independent	S. B. Aadityan	33,636	57.73%	
INC	S. Kandasamy	22,429	38.50%	
Independent	M. Arunachalam	1,115	1.91%	
Independent	A. P. V. Athimuthu	1,083	1.86%	
Margin of victory		11,207	19.24%	
Turnout		58,263	57.55%	
Registered electors		1,01,233		
Independent win (new seat)				

=== 1952 ===
1952 Madras Legislative Assembly election: Sattankulam
Party	Candidate	Votes	%	±%
Independent	Kosalram	12,498	36.48%	
Independent	Meganathan	9,615	28.06%	
Independent	Jayaraj Nadar	8,071	23.56%	
Independent	Mohammad Hussain	4,078	11.90%	
Margin of victory		2,883	8.41%	
Turnout		34,262	51.15%	
Registered electors		66,988		
Independent win (new seat)				
