= S. S. Mani Nadar =

Indian politician

S. S. Mani Nadar (died 9 November 2002) was an Indian politician and a Member of the Legislative Assembly (MLA). He was elected to the Tamil Nadu legislative assembly as a Tamil Maanila Congress (Moopanar) (TMC) candidate from Sathankulam constituency in the 1996 and 2001 elections.

Nadar had been one of five TMC MLAs, including one who was a member of the Republican Party of India but who had been elected on a TMC ticket, who objected in August 2002 to a proposed merger of the party with the Indian National Congress.

He died in Chennai on 9 November 2002, aged 66.
