= Anirudha Sinha =

Indian politician

Member of Parliament, Lok Sabha
- In office 1952–1962
- Succeeded by: Yogendra Jha
- Constituency: Madhubani, Bihar

Personal details
- Born: 5 November 1904 Simri, Darbhanga, Bihar, British India
- Party: Indian National Congress
- Spouse: Jogeshwari Devi
- Children: 4 Sons and 1 daughter

Anirudha Sinha (born 5 November 1904, died 27 December, year unknown) was an Indian politician belonging to the Indian National Congress. He was elected to the lower House of the Indian Parliament the Lok Sabha from Madhubani in Bihar.

== Personal life ==
Anirudha Sinha was born on 5 November 1904 in Simri, Rajnagar, Bihar, to an aristocratic Chandel Rajput family. His father was Sri Janakdhari Sinha. He was educated at Watson H.E. School in Madhubani.

In 1931 he married Shrimati Jogeshwari Devi, and has a total of 5 children; 4 sons and 1 daughter.

== Career ==
From 1925-27 Sinha was Assistant Head Master of the Gandhi Vidyalaya, Hajipur. In 1928 Sinha worked as sub-editor for 'The New Servant' in Calcutta. Sinha was appointed President of the Gandhi National Memorial Fund and the Darbangha D.C.C. from 1947-52.

During his life Sinha was dedicated to the uplifting of the Harijaiis. Sinha was also a keen sportsman and was a member of the Darbangha Town Club.

== Political Life ==
Anirudha Sinha was a part of the Provisional Parliament from 1950–52 and the First Lok Sabha from 1952-57.
