= Randhir Prasad =

Indian politician and businessman

Randhir Prasad (died 1980) was an Indian politician and businessman from Giridih, Bihar. He was one of three sons of a wealthy family. He served as general secretary of the Students Union at Giridih College. From 1971 onwards he served as chairman of the Giridih municipality. He owned hundreds of liquor shops across several states, including Bihar, Uttar Pradesh and Orissa.

In Giridih, Prasad was seen as a Robin Hood-like figure, known for his philanthropic actions towards the local community. His image was tarnished by a scandal in 1979, after 233 people in Dhanbad District died from liquor poisoning. However, his reputation in Giridih remained solid and he was nominated as the Congress (I) candidate for the Giridih seat in the 1980 Bihar Legislative Assembly election. This was the first time he contested an election to the Legislative Assembly.

Randhir Prasad died in a jeep accident on May 16, 1980, just two weeks ahead of the election, at the age of 35. The election in Giridih was countermanded and held in 1981. His widow, Urmila Devi, stood as candidate for the seat. Devi, with no previous political experience, managed to defeat the incumbent veteran Communist Party of India politician Chaturanan Mishra with 55.71% of the votes in the constituency.
