= Murari Mohan Jha =

Indian politician

Dr. Murari Mohan Jha

Member of Bihar Legislative Assembly
- Incumbent
- Assumed office 2020
- Preceded by: Faraz Fatmi
- Constituency: Keoti

Personal details
- Born: 10 October 1957 (age 69) Darbhanga
- Party: Bharatiya Janata Party
- Spouse: Dr. Ram Sati Kumari
- Children: Two sons
- Parents: Late Dr. Shashi Bhushan Jha (father); Late Smt. Surya Tara Devi (mother)
- Occupation: Politics

Dr. Murari Mohan Jha is an Indian politician and a member of the Bihar Legislative Assembly from the Keoti Assembly constituency in Darbhanga district, Bihar. He belongs to the Bharatiya Janata Party (BJP).

Political career

Jha first won the Keoti seat in the 2020 Bihar Legislative Assembly election as the BJP candidate. He polled 76,372 votes and defeated Abdul Bari Siddiqui of the Rashtriya Janata Dal (RJD), a veteran RJD leader and seven-time MLA, by 5,126 votes.

In the 2025 Bihar Legislative Assembly election, Jha was re-elected from Keoti on a BJP ticket. He polled 89,123 votes and defeated Faraz Fatmi of the RJD by 7,305 votes. This was a larger winning margin than in 2020. Fatmi is the son of Mohammad Ali Ashraf Fatmi, a senior RJD leader who served as Minister of State for Human Resource Development in the first UPA government and was a four-time Member of Parliament from Darbhanga.
