= Bhogendra Jha =

Indian politician

Member of Parliament, Lok Sabha
- In office 1967–1977
- Preceded by: Yamuna Prasad Mandal
- Succeeded by: Chaudhary Hukmadeo Narayan Yadav
- In office 1980–1984
- Preceded by: Shafiqullah Ansar
- Succeeded by: Maulana Abdul Hannan Ansari
- In office 1989–1996
- Preceded by: Maulana Abdul Hannan Ansari
- Succeeded by: Chaturanan Mishra
- Constituency: Madhubani, Bihar

Personal details
- Born: 1923 Barha, Darbhanga district, Bihar, British India
- Died: 20 January 2009 (aged 85–86)
- Party: Communist party of India
- Spouse: Chandrakala Jha
- Children: 3 Sons

Bhogendra Jha (1923 – 20 January 2009) was an Indian politician belonging to the Communist party of India. He was elected to the Lok Sabha the lower house of Indian parliament from Madhubani, Bihar.

Bhogendra Jha joined the Communist Party of India in 1940 and fought for land reforms standing with the marginalized and deprived sections of the agricultural industry. A former President of the All India Kisan Sabha, he was a respected speaker and writer who made great contributions to the fields of philosophy and literature. He was one of the main leaders of the Bihar CPI which at one time was a citadel of the party in the Hindi heartland and remains an important base of the CPI today.
