= V. Radhika Selvi =

Indian politician

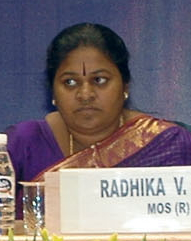

Minister of State for Home Affairs
- In office 18 May 2007 — 23 May 2009
- Prime Minister: Manmohan Singh

Member of Parliament, Lok Sabha
- In office 16 May 2004 — 16 May 2009
- Succeeded by: constituency dissolved
- Constituency: Tiruchendur

Personal details
- Born: 29 January 1976 (age 50) Chennai, Tamil Nadu
- Party: Dravida Munnetra Kazhagam
- Spouse: N. Venkatesha Pannayar
- Children: 1 son
- As of 22 September, 2006

V. Radhika Selvi (born 29 January 1976) was a member of the 14th Lok Sabha of India. She was the Minister of State for Home Affairs in the Manmohan Singh led ministry. She represented the Tiruchendur constituency of Tamil Nadu.

She is the wife of the late Moolakarai Venkatesh Pannayar Nadar.
