= Tiruchendur Lok Sabha constituency =

Former constituency of the Indian parliament in Tamil Nadu

Coordinates: 8.5°N 78.1°E

Tiruchendur
- Former Lok Sabha constituency

Constituency details
- Country: India
- Region: South India
- State: Tamil Nadu
- Established: 1957
- Abolished: 2008
- Total electors: 16,95,239
- Reservation: None

Tiruchendur was a Lok Sabha constituency in Tamil Nadu until 2008 constituency realignment.

== Assembly segments ==
Before constituencies realignment of 2008, Tiruchendur Lok Sabha constituency was composed of the following assembly segments:

- Cheranmadevi (defunct)
- Nanguneri (moved to Tirunelveli Constituency)
- Radhapuram (moved to Tirunelveli Constituency)
- Sathankulam (defunct)
- Tiruchendur (moved to Thoothukkudi Constituency)
- Kanyakumari (moved to Kanniyakumari Constituency)

== Members of Parliament ==
Year	Name	Party
1957	T. Ganapathy	Indian National Congress
1962	T. T. Krishnamachari	Indian National Congress
1967	Santhosam	Swatantra Party
1971	M. S. Sivasamy	Dravida Munnetra Kazhagam
1977	K. T. Kosalram	Indian National Congress
1980	K. T. Kosalram	Indian National Congress
1984	K. T. Kosalram	Indian National Congress
1985^	R. Dhanuskodi Athithan	Indian National Congress
1989	R. Dhanuskodi Athithan	Indian National Congress
1991	R. Dhanuskodi Athithan	Indian National Congress
1996	R. Dhanuskodi Athithan	Tamil Maanila Congress (Moopanar)
1998	Ramarajan	All India Anna Dravida Munnetra Kazhagam
1999	A. D. K. Jayaseelan	Dravida Munnetra Kazhagam
2004	V. Radhika Selvi	Dravida Munnetra Kazhagam

- After 2008 constituency realignment, this seat ceased to exist.

== Electorate ==
In 2004, it had 10,31,362 of electorate, 4,95,753 men and 5,35,609 women.

== Election results ==
Vote share of Winning candidates
2004	62.50%
1999	43.6%
1998	48.3%
1996	53.3%
1991	71.4%
1989	67.0%
1985	62.0%
1984	67.9%
1980	51.0%
1977	60.2%
1971	47.6%
1967	45.8%
1962	N/A%
1957	N/A%

=== 2004 ===
2004 Indian general elections: Tiruchendur
Party	Candidate	Votes	%	±%
DMK	V. Radhika Selvi	394,484	62.50	+18.89
AIADMK	T. Thamodaran	212,803	33.72	+1.05
Majority		181,681	28.79	+17.83
Turnout		631,124	61.18	+8.83
DMK hold		Swing	+18.89	

=== General Election 1999 ===
Party	Candidate	Votes	%
DMK	A.D.K.Jayaseelan	237,630	43.6%
AIADMK	Dr.P.B.Rajan	177,964	32.7%
TMC(M)	Dhanushkodi Aadhithan	109,035	20.0%
IND	S.Selvin Nadar	8,323	1.5%
Majority		59,666	11.0%
Turnout		544,782	52.4%
DMKgain from AIADMK			

=== General Election 1998 ===
Party	Candidate	Votes	%
AIADMK	Ramaraajan	264,290	48.3%
TMC(M)	Dhanushkodi Aadhithan	217,435	39.7%
INC	Kumari Ananthan	38,291	7.0%
IND	A.Backiyaraj	11,408	2.1%
Majority		46,855	8.6%
Turnout		547,234	54.0%
AIADMK gain from TMC			

=== General Election 1996 ===
Party	Candidate	Votes	%
TMC	Dhanushkodi Aadhithan	317,943	53.3%
INC	S.Justin	114,232	19.2%
BJP	N.S.Chandra Bose	79,051	13.3%
JD	Anton Gomez	48,066	8.1%
IND	R.Sundaram	3,274	0.5%
IND	S.Arullappa Nadar	2,995	0.5%
Majority		203,711	34.2%
Turnout		596,500	60.9%
TMC(M) gain from INC			

=== General Election 1991 ===
Party	Candidate	Votes	%
INC	Dhanushkodi Aadhithan	381,521	71.4%
JD	G.Anton Gomez	122,745	23.0%
Jharkhand Party	B.Samson Daniel	5,181	1.0%
PMK	R.Christ Doss	2,855	0.5%
Tharasu Makkal Mandram	I.Ilavarasan	1,740	0.3%
Majority		258,776	48.4%
Turnout		534,586	56.6%
INC Hold			

=== General Election 1989 ===
Party	Candidate	Votes	%
INC	Dhanushkodi Aadhithan	385,656	67.0%
DMK	A.Karthikeyan	173,585	30.2%
Tharasu Makkal Mandram	I.Ilavarasan	1,602	0.3%
IND	Leshmana Perumal	1,535	0.3%
PMK	C.Papanasam	1,500	0.3%
Majority		212,071	36.8%
Turnout		575,556	60.5%
INC Hold			

=== By-election 1985 ===
Party	Candidate	Votes	%
INC	Dhanushkodi Aadhithan	169,710	62.0%
JP	P.Vijayaraghavan	93,831	34.3%
Majority		75,819	
Turnout		273,776	
INC Hold			

=== General Election 1984 ===
Party	Candidate	Votes	%
INC	K.T.Kosalram	345,381	67.9%
JP	Jawaharlal	121,954	24.0%
IND	A.Dhanushkodi Ramalinga Pandian	11,573	2.3%
IND	K.Kesavam	5,671	1.1%
Majority		223,427	43.9%
Turnout		508,487	67.9%
INC Hold			

=== General Election 1980 ===
Party	Candidate	Votes	%
INC(I)	K.T.Kosalram	227,395	51.0%
JP	N.Soundara Pandian	113,576	25.5%
IND	Ananthan	75,020	16.8%
JP(S)	Pillai	14,106	3.2%
Majority		113,819	25.5%
Turnout		445,880	63.3%
INC(I) Hold			

=== General Election 1977 ===
Party	Candidate	Votes	%
INC	K.T.Kosalram	272,338	60.2%
INC(O)	Devadasan Edwin	152,148	33.6%
IND	Arumugam Pandian	11,336	2.5%
Majority		120,190	26.6%
Turnout		452,540	63.5%
INC gain from DMK			

=== General Election 1971 ===
Party	Candidate	Votes	%
DMK	M.S.Sivasamy	202,783	47.6%
SWA	N.Parthasarathy	202,757	47.6%
IND	A.Ponnaih	5,845	1.4%
Majority		26	0.0%
Turnout		411,385	69.8%
DMK gain from SWA			

=== General Election 1967 ===
Party	Candidate	Votes	%
SWA	Santhosham	183,053	45.8%
INC	K.T.Kosalram	182,659	45.7%
Majority		394	0.1%
Turnout		390,339	71.1%
SWA gain from INC			

=== General Election 1962 ===
Party	Candidate	Votes
INC	T.T.Krishnamachari	Unopposed

=== General Election 1957 ===
Party	Candidate	Votes	%
INC	T.Ganapathy	RU	N/A
IND	N.Duraipandi	0	0.0%
INC Win (New Seat)			

== See also ==
- Thiruchendur
- List of constituencies of the Lok Sabha
