= Ashok Kumar Yadav =

Indian politician and member of the 17th Lok Sabha

Member of Parliament, Lok Sabha
- Incumbent
- Assumed office 23 May 2019
- Preceded by: Hukmdev Narayan Yadav
- Constituency: Madhubani

Personal details
- Born: 21 June 1970 (age 55) Darbhanga, Bihar, India
- Party: Bharatiya Janata Party
- Spouse: Sita Devi
- Parent: Hukumdev Narayan Yadav
- Occupation: Politician

Ashok Kumar Yadav (born 21 June 1970) is an Indian politician. He was elected to the Lok Sabha, lower house of the Parliament of India from Madhubani, Bihar in the 2019 Indian general election as member of the Bharatiya Janata Party. He was elected to the Bihar Legislative Assembly from Keoti (Vidhan Sabha constituency) as a member of Bharatiya Janata party in February 2005, October 2005 and again in 2010. He is the son of BJP leader Hukumdev Narayan Yadav.
