= Martin (Sathankulam MLA) =

Indian politician

T. Martin was an Indian politician and former Member of the Legislative Assembly. He was elected to the Tamil Nadu Legislative Assembly as an Indian National Congress candidate from Sathankulam constituency in 1967 election.
