= S. N. Ramasamy =

Indian politician

S. N. Ramasamy Nadar is an Indian politician and former Member of the Legislative Assembly. He was elected to the Tamil Nadu legislative assembly as a Gandhi Kamaraj National Congress candidate from Sathankulam constituency in 1980 and 1984 elections.
