= Kumari Ananthan =

Indian politician (1933–2025)

Kumari Anandan

Personal details
- Born: Harikrishnan Nadar Ananthakrishnan; 19 March 1933 Kaniyakumari, Travancore, British Raj
- Died: 9 April 2025 (aged 92) Chennai, Tamil Nadu, India
- Party: INC
- Spouse: Krishnakumari
- Children: Tamilisai Soundararajan
- Parent(s): Father : Harikrishnan Nadar; Mother : Thangammal
- Relatives: H. Vasanthakumar (younger brother); Vijay Vasanth (nephew)
- Website: tncc.org.in

Harikrishnan Nadar Ananthakrishnan (19 March 1933 – 9 April 2025), popularly known as Kumari Ananthan, was an Indian politician who was leader of the Tamil Nadu Congress Committee. He was Perumthalivar Kamarajar awardee of the year in 2021.

== Member of Parliament ==
Ananthan was elected to the Lok Sabha from Nagercoil constituency as an Indian National Congress candidate in 1977 election, but was defeated in the 1996 and 1998 elections. He also served as the president of Tamil Nadu Congress Committee.

== Member of Legislative Assembly ==
Ananthan was a Member of the Legislative Assembly. He floated a new party called " Gandhi Kamaraj National Congress" breaking from Janatha party and had an alliance with AIDMK in the 1980 by election contesting 10 seats and winning 6 of them. He was elected to the Tamil Nadu legislative assembly as a Gandhi Kamaraj National Congress candidate from Thiruvottiyur constituency in 1980 election from Radhapuram constituency in the 1984 election. He was elected as an Indian National Congress candidate from Sathankulam constituency in the 1989 and 1991 elections.

== Gandhi Kamaraj National Congress ==
Ananthan floated Gandhi Kamaraj National Congress, a new political party breaking away from Congress. It started during 1977 elections, it merged with the Indian National Congress later.

== Thondar Congress ==
Ananthan floated Thondar Congress, a new political party breaking away from Congress. He began the party as he said he was frustrated by National Congress leaders' neglect of the Tamil Nadu state party unit and workers. Having failed to make any progress in elections, it merged with the Indian National Congress in 2001.

== Personal life and death ==
Ananthan's youngest brother H. Vasanthakumar was an entrepreneur and a politician.

His daughter is physician-turned-politician Tamilisai Soundararajan who has been appointed Governor of Telangana and Lieutenant Governor of Puducherry.

Ananthan died in Chennai on 9 April 2025, at the age of 92.

== Awards ==
- S. P. Adithanar Senior Tamil Scholar Award - 2011
