= Yamuna Prasad Mandal =

Indian politician

Member of Parliament, Lok Sabha
- In office 1962-1977
- Succeeded by: Karpoori Thakur
- Constituency: Samastipur, Bihar

Personal details
- Born: 10 December 1910 Garhia Bhaptiahi, Saharsa district, Bengal Presidency, British India
- Party: Indian National Congress
- Spouse: Shakuntala Devi

Yamuna Prasad Mandal was an Indian politician belonging to the Indian National Congress. He was elected to the lower House of the Indian Parliament the Lok Sabha from Jainagar (Bihar State) in 1962, and then from Samastipur in Bihar in 1967 and 1971.
