= R. Dhanuskodi Athithan =

Indian politician

Member of Lok Sabha Tirunelveli
- In office 2004–2009

Member of Loksabha Tiruchendur (Lok Sabha constituency)
- In office 1985–1998

Minister for States (Youth Affair and Sports Development)
- In office 2004–2009

Personal details
- Born: 6 March 1953 (age 73) Thoothukudi, Tamil Nadu
- Party: INC
- Spouse: Late Mrs. Indra Devi Adithan
- Children: Dhanesh Adithan (son) and 2 daughters

R. Dhanuskodi Athithan (born 6 March 1953) is an Indian politician who was a member of the 14th Lok Sabha of India. He represented the Tirunelveli constituency of Tamil Nadu and is a member of the Indian National Congress (INC) political party. He was critically wounded in a road accident which happened near Vaagaikulam on the Tirunelveli - Tuticorin National Highway on 6 August 2006. His wife Indra Devi Adithan died in the accident.

== Electoral performance in Lok Sabha Elections ==
Year	Winner	Party	Runner-up	Party
1985 (by-election)	R. Dhanushkodi Adithan	INC	Pon. Vijayaraghavan	JP
1989	R. Dhanushkodi Adithan	INC	A. Karthikeyan	DMK
1991 (Tiruchendur constituency)	R. Dhanushkodi Adithan	INC	G. Anton Gomez	JD
1996 (Tiruchendur constituency)	R. Dhanushkodi Adithan	TMC(M)	S. Justin	INC
1998 (Tiruchendur constituency)	Ramarajan	ADMK	R. Dhanushkodi Adithan	TMC(M)
2004	R. Dhanushkodi Adithan	INC	R. Amirtha Ganesan	ADMK
