= Kumai (village) =

Kumai Nari Bhadon Tole Kumai
- Village
- Location within Bihar
- Coordinates: 25°59′27.0672″N 86°15′11.9412″E
- Country: India
- State: Bihar
- Region: Mithila
- District: Darbhanga
- Vidhan Sabha Constituency: 79. Gaura Bauram
- Type: Open
- Lok Sabha constituency: 14. Darbhanga
- PIN Code: 847103 or 847203
- Area code: 06242
- Website: http://kumaiourvillage.blogspot.in

Kumai is a village in Kumai Bhadon Panchayat in Gaurabauram block of Darbhanga district in the Indian state of Bihar.

It is located 54 km east of the district headquarters Darbhanga, and 146 km from the state capital Patna. Its PIN code is 847103, STD Code is 06242 and postal head office is Benipur.

Boundaries of the village are:

N: Nari
S: BANGARHATTA
E: MAHUAR
W: ROHAR

== Area and population ==
The village is spread over 600 acres of land. The total number of houimately eholds is approx 1,700, consisting of 6,232 voters and a population of approximately 15,000 divided into 12 wards. Most of the population are dependent on agriculture and produces mainly two crops Wheat and Padi. Literacy rate of the village is 54% approx but it has produced a number of higher qualifications including 3 MBBS, 2 Chartered Accountant, 15 Engineers and an ASM.

== Representatives ==
The MP of the area is Gopal Jee Thakur, MLA of the area is Swarna Singh, Zila Parishad of the area is Ajay Yadav, Panchayat Samiti of the area is shri Manoj Sharma.

The Mukhiya of Village panchayat is Mrs. Ratan Devi and Sarpanch of the village is Mrs. Aisa Mashkur.

== Schools ==
There are six schools and seven Anganwadi Kendra in the Gram Panchayat. K. G. Public School (Islam Nagar, Kumai-Nari), Rajkiya Utkramit Madhya Vidyalay (Kumai) (Hindi), Rajkiya Prathmik vidyalay Maktab (Kumai) (Urdu), Rajkiya Prathmik Vidyalay (Vinovanagar, Bhadaun), Rajkiya Madhya Vidyalay (Bhadaun), Navsrijit Vidyalay (Islamnagar, Kumai).

== Pond ==
There are around 10 pond in the Gram Panchayat namely Anhri, Makhnahi, Singrahi, Chamrahi, Navki, Mathahi in Kumai and Bhaujahi, Khawn Phokhar, Panpiwi, Nansukh in Bhadaun.

== Religious places ==
There are three mosques in the village and more than 10 temples in the Gram Panchayat. Bhagwati Sthan (Durga Sthan) is one of the famous temple campus in the village containing Hanuman Mandir, Salhesh Mandir, Kaaru Baba Mandir, where various religious functions are organised on regular intervals including annual celebration of Durga Puja (Navaratri).

Apart from above Bhramha Sthan, Langota Baba, Kaali Madir, Bhagwati Sthan, Shivalay are also the temples in the Panchayat. There are five temples of Lord Hanuman.

== Public utilities ==
There is one government hospital in the village. There is a bank (State Bank of India) also in the village near Panchayat Bhawan, branch name bearing Nari Bhadaun.

== Images ==
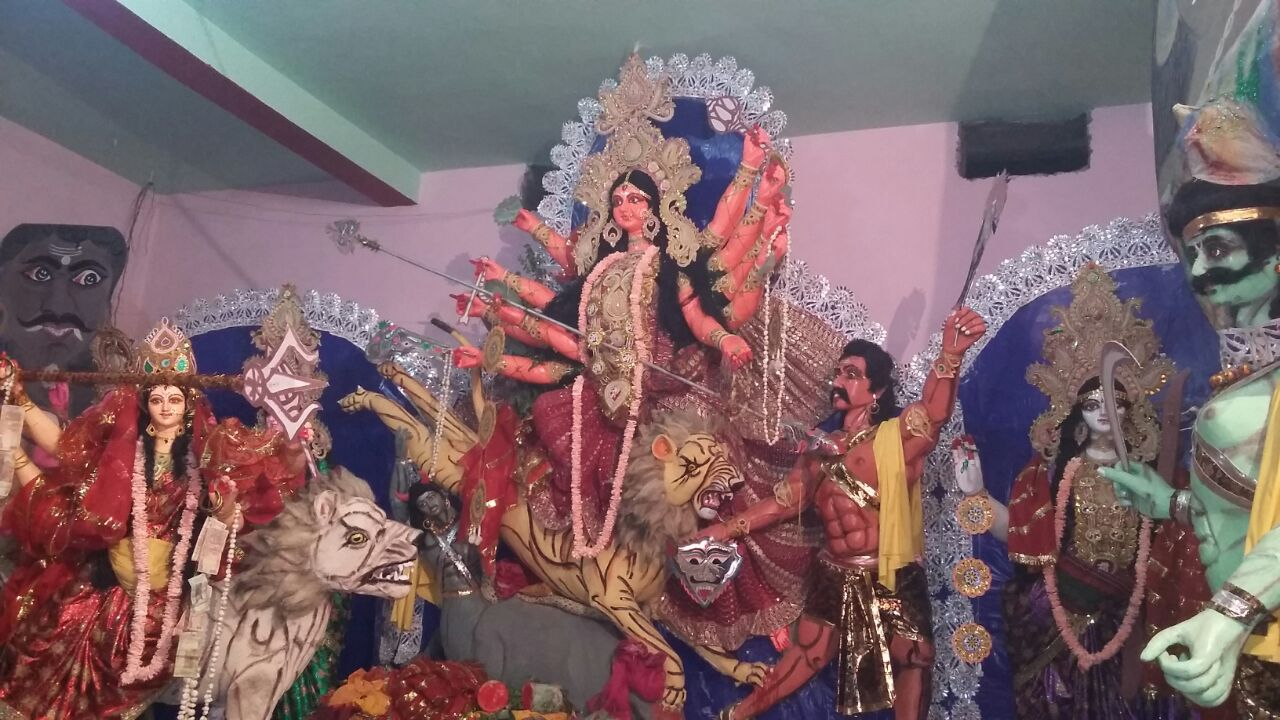
Durga Puja (Kumai) 2015

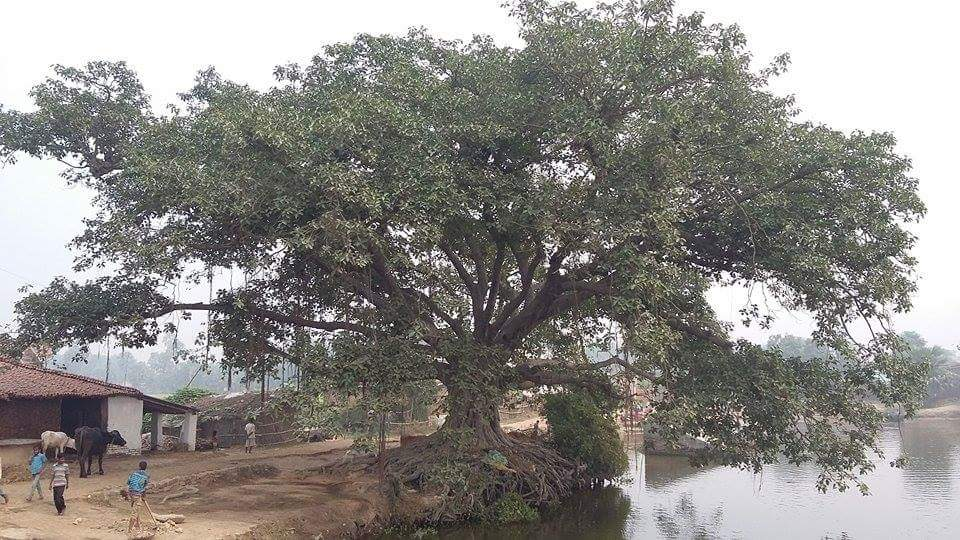
Oldest Tree at Singrahi Pokhar

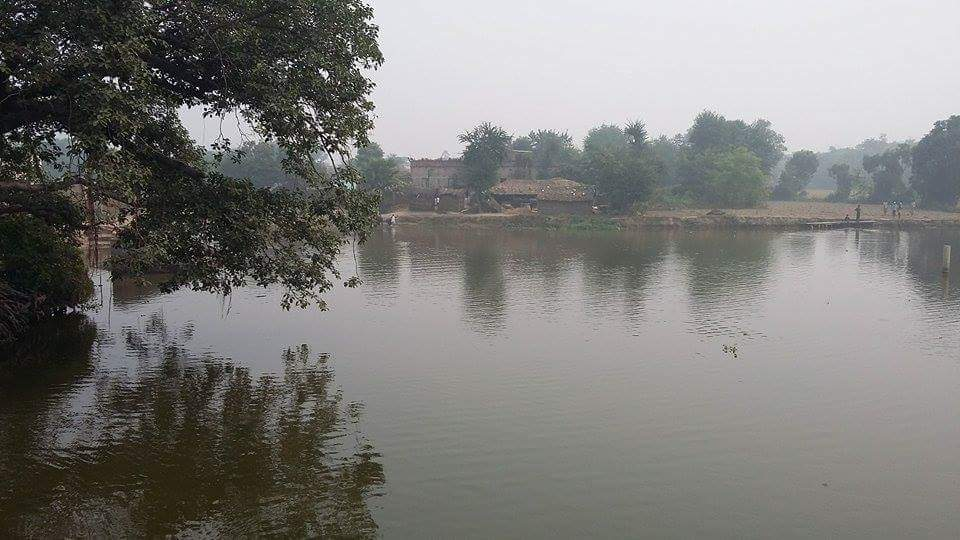
Singh Rahi Pokhar

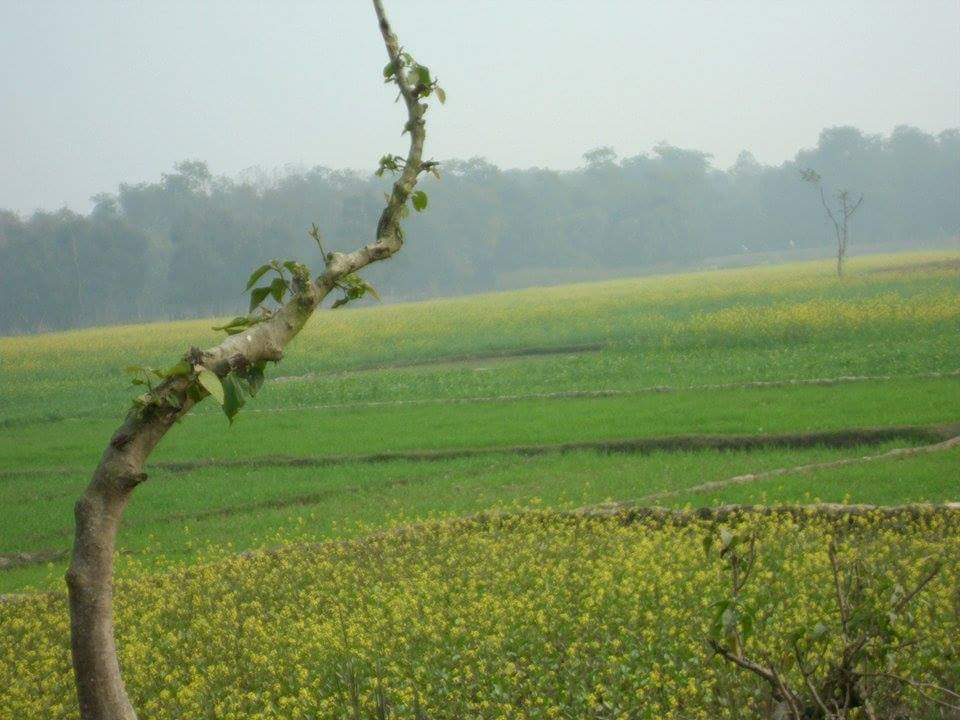
Crops of Wheat and Mustard plant
