= List of by-elections to the Bihar Legislative Assembly =

The following is a list of by-elections held for the Bihar Legislative Assembly, India, since its formation in 1947.

== 16th Assembly ==
=== 2016 ===
S.No	Date	Constituency	MLA before election	Party before election	Elected MLA	Party after election
1	13 February 2016	Harlakhi	Basant Kushwaha	Rashtriya Lok Samata Party	Sudhanshu Shekhar	Rashtriya Lok Samata Party

=== 2018 ===
S.No	Date	Constituency	MLA before election	Party before election	Elected MLA	Party after election
1	11 March 2018	Bhabua	Anand Bhushan Pandey	Bharatiya Janata Party	Rinki Rani Pandey	Bharatiya Janata Party
2	11 March 2018	Jehanabad	Mudrika Singh Yadav	Rashtriya Janata Dal	Suday Yadav	Rashtriya Janata Dal
3	28 May 2018	Jokihat	Sarfaraz Alam	Janata Dal (United)	Shahnawaz Alam	Rashtriya Janata Dal

=== 2019 ===
S.No	Date	Constituency	MLA before election	Party before election	Elected MLA	Party after election
1	11 April 2019	Nawada	Rajballabh Prasad	Rashtriya Janata Dal	Kaushal Yadav	Janata Dal (United)
2	19 May 2019	Dehri	Mohd. Iliyas Hussain	Rashtriya Janata Dal	Satyanarayan Singh	Bharatiya Janata Party
3	21 October 2019	Simri Bakhtiarpur	Dinesh Chandra Yadav	Janata Dal (United)	Zafar Alam	Rashtriya Janata Dal
4	21 October 2019	Belhar	Giridhari Yadav	Janata Dal (United)	Ramdeo Yadav	Rashtriya Janata Dal
5	21 October 2019	Daraunda	Kavita Singh	Janata Dal (United)	Karnjeet Singh	Independent
6	21 October 2019	Nathnagar	Ajay Kumar Mandal	Janata Dal (United)	Lakshmikant Mandal	Janata Dal (United)
7	21 October 2019	Kishanganj	Mohammad Jawed	Indian National Congress	Qamrul Hoda	All India Majlis-e-Ittehadul Muslimeen

== 17th Assembly ==
=== 2021 ===
S.No	Date	Constituency	MLA before election	Party before election	Elected MLA	Party after election
78	30 October 2021	Kusheshwar Asthan	Shashi Bhushan Hazari	Janata Dal (United)	Aman Bhushan Hajari	Janata Dal (United)
164	30 October 2021	Tarapur	Mewalal Chaudhary	Janata Dal (United)	Rajeev Kumar Singh	Janata Dal (United)

=== 2022 ===
Date	S.No	Constituency	MLA before election	Party before election	Elected MLA	Party after election
12 April 2022	91	Bochahan	Musafir Paswan	Vikassheel Insaan Party	Amar Kumar Paswan	Rashtriya Janata Dal
3 November 2022	101	Gopalganj	Subash Singh	Bharatiya Janata Party	Kusum Devi	Bharatiya Janata Party
3 November 2022	178	Mokama	Anant Kumar Singh	Rashtriya Janata Dal	Nilam Devi	Rashtriya Janata Dal
5 December 2022	93	Kurhani	Anil Sahani	Rashtriya Janata Dal	Kedar Prasad Gupta	Bharatiya Janata Party

=== 2024 ===
Date	Constituency		Previous MLA		Reason	Elected MLA	
1 June 2024	195	Agiaon	Manoj Manzil	Communist Party of India (Marxist–Leninist) Liberation	Disqualified on 16 February 2024	Shiv Prakash Ranjan	Communist Party of India (Marxist–Leninist) Liberation
10 July 2024	60	Rupauli	Bima Bharti	Janata Dal (United)	Resigned on 11 April 2024	Shankar Singh	Independent
13 November 2024	196	Tarari	Sudama Prasad	Communist Party of India (Marxist–Leninist) Liberation	Elected to Lok Sabha on June 4, 2024	Vishal Prashant	Bharatiya Janata Party
13 November 2024	203	Ramgarh	Sudhakar Singh	Rashtriya Janata Dal	Elected to Lok Sabha on June 4, 2024	Ashok Kumar Singh	Bharatiya Janata Party
13 November 2024	227	Imamganj	Jitan Ram Manjhi	Hindustani Awam Morcha	Elected to Lok Sabha on June 4, 2024	Deepa Manjhi	Hindustani Awam Morcha
13 November 2024	232	Belaganj	Surendra Prasad Yadav	Rashtriya Janata Dal	Elected to Lok Sabha on June 4, 2024	Manorama Devi	Janata Dal (United)
