= Darbhanga district =

District in Bihar, India

Coordinates: 26°00′N 86°00′E

- District
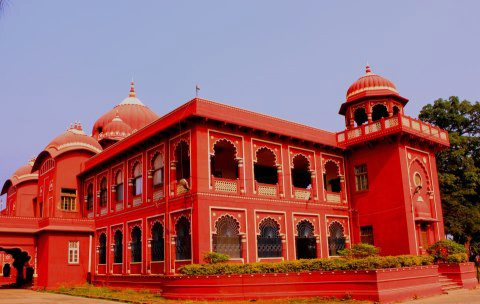
- Lalit Narayan Mithila University, Darbhanga
- Interactive map of Darbhanga district
- Country: India
- State: Bihar
- Region: Mithila
- Division: Darbhanga
- Headquarters: Darbhanga

Government
  - Lok Sabha constituencies: Darbhanga
  - Member of Parliament, Lok Sabha: Gopal Jee Thakur, BJP
  - District Magistrate: Shri Rajiv Raushan(IAS)
  - Senior Superintendent of Police: Shri Awakash Kumar(IPS)
  - Vidhan Sabha constituencies: Kusheshwar Asthan, Gaura Bauram, Benipur, Alinagar, Darbhanga Rural, Darbhanga, Hayaghat, Bahadurpur, Keoti, Jale

Area
  - Total: 2,279 km^{2} (880 sq mi)

Population (2011)
  - Total: 3,937,385
  - Density: 1,728/km^{2} (4,475/sq mi)
  - Urban: 8.7 per cent

Demographics
  - Literacy: 56.56 per cent
  - Sex ratio: 1024
- Time zone: UTC+05:30 (IST)
- Major highways: NH 27, NH 527B
- Website: darbhanga.bih.nic.in

Darbhanga district is one of the thirty-eight districts of the eastern Indian state of Bihar. The city of Darbhanga is the administrative headquarters of this district and 5th largest city of Bihar as well. Darbhanga district lies in the Darbhanga division, within the historical Mithila region. The district is bounded on the north by Madhubani district, on the south by Samastipur district, on the east by Saharsa district and on the west by Sitamarhi and Muzaffarpur districts. The district covers an area of 2,279 km^{2} (880 sq mi). There are several locations related to the epic Ramayana. The Ahalya Sthan, Gautam Ashram and Gautam Kund are major destinations for the Ramayana circuit in the district.

== History ==
1976 saw the creations of two districts from Darbhanga's territory: Madhubani and Samastipur.

== Etymology ==
There are two popular theories

- Dwār Banga or Dari – Banga, meaning the Door of Bengal (a popular cultural,historial region 500km away)
- Or it may have been named after Darbhangi Khan - a little-known local chieftain or military figure.

== Geography ==
Darbhanga district occupies an area of 2,279 square kilometres (880 sq mi). It is part of larger Indo-Gangetic plains. It has vast, fertile alluvial plain, best suited for agriculture. Perennial rivers like Kamla, Bagmati, Koshi and Kareh originating from Himalayas water this region. Alluvial soil type is found here.

== Economy ==
Agriculture is the largest source of employment. Rice, wheat, maize and pulses are most grown crop. Mangoes are also grown in large quantity. Recently Makhana(foxnuts) are grown in large quantity and exported to the rest of the country.

Due to fewer options for employment, most of the educated professional migrate to metro cities.

In 2006, the Ministry of Panchayati Raj named Darbhanga one of the country's 250 most backward districts (out of a total of 640). It is one of the 36 districts in Bihar currently receiving funds from the Backward Regions Grant Fund Programme (BRGF).

== Education ==
=== Primary, Secondary and Higher Secondary Education ===
As per 2015-16 report by UNICEF and Bihar Education Project Council, there are 2,796 schools. Out of these 2,418 are govt, 131 govt-aided and 247 are private schools.

There are 1,567 primary schools(upto class 5), 1,079 upper-primary schools(upto class 8), 144 secondary and higher-secondary schools(upto 10-12).

Total 6,03,913 students were enrolled - 3,07,499 boys, and 2,96,414 girls. Out of these 5,41,797 were in govt, 18,831 in govt-aided and 43,285 in private schools.

As per the same report, pupil teacher ratio is heavily skewed, there are hundreds of school where ratio exceeds 100, and also there are severe lack of basic amenities like washrooms, boundary wall, playground and ramp.

These schools provide free education, mid-day meal, books and school dress.

=== Undergraduate ===
Lalit Narayan Mithila University(LNMU), a NAAC B++ accredited university, established in 1972 has 22 constituent colleges spread all over Darbhanga, prominent one being C.M college, C.M Science college, C.M Law college, Marwari college, etc.

Kameshwar Singh Darbhanga Sanskrit University established in 1961 provides courses in Sanskrit language and related subjects like Vyakarana, Sahitya, Veda, Jyotish, Dharmashastra and Darshan. It also provides UG courses in Mithila Lok kala, Tabla, Sitar, Painting, etc.

It has 7 constituent colleges and few other affiliated colleges spread across Darbhanga.

Darbhanga Medical College and Hospital (DMCH) established in 1925 is one of the oldest medical college of India and the only medical institute.

Darbhanga College of Engineering, established in 2008, affiliated to Bihar Engineering University is the only major engineering college of this district.

Dr. APJ Abdul Kalam Women's Institute of Technology, affiliated to Lalit Narayan Mithila University offer courses like B.Tech CS/IT, MCA for female students.

Lack of technical institutes forces student to migrate to other parts of India for education.

=== Postgraduate, Doctoral, Post-Doctoral ===
LNMU has 21 PG departments in subjects such as Botany, Chemistry, Mathematics, Physics, Zoology, Ancient Indian History, Economics, Geogrophy, History, Home Science, Political Science, Psychology, Sociology, Commerce, English, Hindi, Maithili, Philosophy, Sanskrit, Urdu, Music, Dramatics.

University provides opportunities for doctoral and post-doctoral programmes.

== Art & Culture ==
Popular festivals like Chhat, Dussehra and Diwali are celebrated with great enthusiasm. Thousands of migrants come back home during these festivals and celebrate with friends and family.

Darbhanga is part of broader region called Mithila(or Mithilanchal) which has unique form of its art - Madhubani painting, which originated in Madhubani region, now a separate district carved out of Darbhanga. Chitwarpur village(now in Madhubani) has hundreds of artist working on this art form and 3 person from this village has received Padma Shree for the same. Govt of Bihar has started an institute - Mithila Chitrakala Sansthan dedicated to promote awarness and teach this art form.

=== Museum ===
Chandradhari Museum in Darbhanga city near railway station has impressive collection of arts, rare paintings and historical artifacts.

=== Holy Sites ===
==== Baba Kusheshwar Nath Temple ====
It is located in Kusheshwar Asthan and on Shrawan Mela and Maha Shivratri, thousands of devotees from and around Mithila visit this temple.

==== Shyama Mai Temple ====
It is a temple built on the pyre of Maharaja Rameshwar Singh and located near LNMU main campus.

==== Madhaveshwar Temple ====
It is a temple dedicated to Lord Mahadev and founded by King Madhav, hence known as Madhveshvar Mahadev Temple. It is located inside a 51 acre burial-ground-cum-temple complex that houses Shyama Mai Temple as well as many other.

==== Ahilya Sthan ====
It is a historic temple dedicated to Mata Ahilya from the Ramayana in Kamtaul district.

==== Maa Kankali Mandir ====
It is located inside Darbhanga Fort complex and patron deity of Darbhanga royal family.

==== Manokamna Mandir ====
It is a temple dedicated to Lord Hanuman in Darbhanga city near Sanskrit University.

==== Nawada Durga Mandir ====
Temple dedicated to goddess Durga is situated in Nawada village. During Navratri, huge number of devotees visit this temple.

==== Holy Rosary Church ====
It is a catholic church established in 1891. It is close to Darbhanga railway station.

==== Shahi Jama Masjid ====
It is located in Quilaghat near CM Science college and one of the oldest mosque in Darbhanga. As per the information board, this mosque was established in 1235.

== Demographics ==
Historical population
Year	Pop.	±% p.a.
1901	889,022	—
1911	894,232	+0.06%
1921	889,302	−0.06%
1931	966,393	+0.83%
1941	1,055,208	+0.88%
1951	1,150,582	+0.87%
1961	1,337,802	+1.52%
1971	1,622,812	+1.95%
1981	2,008,193	+2.15%
1991	2,510,959	+2.26%
2001	3,295,789	+2.76%
2011	3,937,385	+1.79%

Religions in Darbhanga district (2011)
Religion	Percent
Hinduism	77.28%
Islam	22.39%
Other or not stated	0.33%

According to the 2011 census, Darbhanga district has a population of 3,937,385, roughly equal to the nation of Liberia or the Indian state of Tripura. This gives it a ranking of 64th in India (out of a total of 640). The district has a population density of 1,721 inhabitants per square kilometre (4,460/sq mi). Its population growth rate over the decade 2001-2011 was 19%. Literacy rate of the district is 56.56% (male 66.83%, female 45.24%). 9.74% of the population lives in urban areas. Scheduled Castes and Scheduled Tribes make up 15.64% and 0.07% of the population respectively.

Languages of Darbhanga district (2011)
1. Maithili (72.8%)
2. Urdu (20.7%)
3. Hindi (5.96%)
4. Others (0.62%)

At the time of the 2011 Census of India, 72.75% of the population in the district spoke Maithili, 20.67% Urdu and 5.96% Hindi as their first language.

== Health ==
Darbhanga has one Govt medical college-cum-hospital - Darbhanga medical college hospital. It is currently being upgraded by state government and once it is complete the bed count will be 2500 beds. Central Government approved setting up of new AIIMS at Darbhanga on 15 Nov 2020 and was inaugurated by PM on 13 Nov 2024. It has been allotted 2006 crore on 25 March 2026 by Cabinet and is expected to be completed by 2029.

Other Govt operated hospital include - 1 sub divisional hospital, 8 Community Health centre (CHC), 24 Health and wellness centre (HWC-PHC), 79 PHCs, and 398 Health Sub Centres. Following table shows the block wise distribution but note that this is outdated. It only shows 13 while Darbhanga has 18 blocks as of 2026.

Health centres in Darbhanga district by block
S. No.	Subdivision	Block	Health Sub Centres (HSC)	Additional PHCs (APHC)	Primary Health Centres (PHC)
1	Darbhanga Sadar	Darbhanga Sadar	19	2	1
2	Darbhanga Sadar	Bahadurpur	19	1	1
3	Darbhanga Sadar	Hayaghat	24	5	1
4	Darbhanga Sadar	Jale	19	2	1
5	Darbhanga Sadar	Manigachhi	32	8	1
6	Darbhanga Sadar	Keoti	21	1	1
7	Darbhanga Sadar	Singhwara	23	2	1
8	Benipur	Benipur	23	4	1
9	Benipur	Baheri	20	2	1
10	Biraul	Biraul	21	2	1
11	Biraul	Ghanshyampur	21	4	1
12	Biraul	Kiratpur	0	0	1
13	Biraul	Kusheshwar Asthan	19	4	1
Total			261	37	13

The table below shows the data from the district nutrition profile of children below the age of 5 years, in Darbhanga, as of year 2020.

District nutrition profile of children under 5 years of age in Darbhanga, year 2020
Indicators	Number of children (<5 years)	Percent (2020)	Percent (2016)
Stunted	255,374	45%	49%
Wasted	108,562	19%	17%
Severely wasted	36,000	6%	5%
Underweight	220,499	39%	41%
Overweight/obesity	8,494	2%	2%
Anemia	348,147	69%	70%
Total children	562,497		

The table below shows the district nutrition profile of Darbhanga of women between the ages of 15 and 49 years, as of year 2020.

District nutritional profile of Darbhanga of women of 15–49 years, in 2020
Indicators	Number of women (15–49 years)	Percent (2020)	Percent (2016)
Underweight (BMI <18.5 kg/m^2)	293,595	26%	31%
Overweight/obesity	154,023	13%	12%
Hypertension	200,126	17%	11%
Diabetes	154,596	13%	NA
Anemia (non-preg)	703,022	61%	66%
Anemia (preg)	74,677	53%	62%
Total women (preg)	142,241		
Total women	1,146,855		

== Politics ==
Darbhanga District map

=== Parliamentary elections ===
Currently Gopal Jee Thakur of Bhartiya Janta Party is the Member of Parliament from Darbhanga Lok Sabha Constituency.

=== Bihar Legislative Assembly elections ===
District	No.	Constituency	Name	Party	Alliance	Remarks
Darbhanga	78	Kusheshwar Asthan (SC)	Atirek Kumar	JD(U)	NDA	
Darbhanga	79	Gaura Bauram	Sujit Kumar	BJP	NDA	
Darbhanga	80	Benipur	Binay Kumar Choudhary	JD(U)	NDA	
Darbhanga	81	Alinagar	Maithili Thakur	BJP	NDA	
Darbhanga	82	Darbhanga Rural	Rajesh Kumar Mandal	JD(U)	NDA	
Darbhanga	83	Darbhanga	Sanjay Saraogi	BJP	NDA	
Darbhanga	84	Hayaghat	Ram Chandra Prasad	BJP	NDA	
Darbhanga	85	Bahadurpur	Madan Sahni	JD(U)	NDA	
Darbhanga	86	Keoti	Murari Mohan Jha	BJP	NDA	
Darbhanga	87	Jale	Jibesh Kumar	BJP	NDA	

=== Bihar Legislative Council elections ===
Under the upper house of the Bihar Legislature, there are three regional seats associated with Darbhanga.

==== Darbhanga Teachers Constituency ====
Though it's named Darbhanga, it covers 4 districts - Darbhanga, Madhubani, Samastipur and Begusarai.

==== Darbhanga Graduates Constituency ====
It follows the same four district boundary - Darbhanga, Madhubani, Samastipur and Begusarai.

==== Darbhanga Local Authorities Constituency ====
This follows Darbhanga district boundary, elected local bodies representatives from Darbhanga vote.

=== Current Members ===
#	Constituency	Member	Party	Term start	Term end
1	Darbhanga Graduates	Anil Jha	RJD	17-Nov-2026	16-Nov-2032
2	Darbhanga Local Authorities	Sunil Chaudhary	BJP	08-Apr-2022	07-Apr-2028
5	Darbhanga Teachers	Suresh Prasad Roy	JSP	17-Nov-2026	16-Nov-2032

== Administration ==
The administrative headquarters of the district is Darbhanga city. Current District Magistrate of Darbhanga is Kaushal Kumar. Senior Superintendent of Police is Jagunath Raddi.

Darbhanga is divided into three subdivisions - Sadar, Benipur and Biraul, and it is further divided into 18 blocks and circle. Each subdivision is headed by one Sub Divisional Officer and DCLR.

Subdivision	Designation	Name
Benipur	DCLR Benipur	Shri Avinash Kumar Singh
Benipur	SDO Benipur	Shri Manish Kumar Jha
Darbhanga Sadar	DCLR Sadar Darbhanga	Shri Sanjeet Kumar
Darbhanga Sadar	SDO Darbhanga	Shri Kumar Gaurav
Biraul	DCLR Biraul	Shri Mayank Singh
Biraul	SDO Biraul	Shri Shashank Raj

Block handles rural development and planning. Circle takes care of Land Records and Revenue Collection.

Each block is headed by Block Development Officer (BDO) and circle is headed by Circle Officer (CO). For agriculture, every block is headed by one Block Agriculture Officer.

#	Subdivision Name	Block Name
1	Darbhanga Sadar	Darbhanga Sadar
1	Darbhanga Sadar	Bahadurpur
1	Darbhanga Sadar	Keoti
1	Darbhanga Sadar	Singhwara
1	Darbhanga Sadar	Jale
1	Darbhanga Sadar	Manigachhi
1	Darbhanga Sadar	Tardih
1	Darbhanga Sadar	Baheri
1	Darbhanga Sadar	Hayaghat
1	Darbhanga Sadar	Hanuman Nagar
2	Benipur	Benipur
2	Benipur	Alinagar
3	Biraul	Biraul
3	Biraul	Ghanshyampur
3	Biraul	Kusheshwar Asthan
3	Biraul	Kusheshwar Asthan East
3	Biraul	Kiratpur
3	Biraul	Gaura Bauram

== Sports ==
Nehru Stadium is Laheriasarai is the District Sports Center and also used as training centre for Football and Badminton through Khelo India and Eklvaya Centre respectively. In Benipur subdivision, Baba Nagarjun Stadium is used as Cricket stadium.

For a vast majority of population of around 4 million and aspiring athlete, there are no sport facility at all and very little support from government.

Even though Kirti Azad, an international level cricketer and a member of winning Indian team at 1983 Cricket World Cup, was elected three times as MP from Darbhanga Lok Sabha constituency, there is no investment in sports related infra and training.

India's first 100m Para Gold Medalist was born in Darbhanga.

Sushant Mishra, a crickter, playing for Gujarat Titans in IPL was born in Darbhanga.

Parimal Kumar was District Sports Officer from 2022 to 2026 and after his transfer to Jamui, this position is vacant.

=== Athletics ===
Darbhanga District Athletics Association(DDAA) is affiliated to Bihar Athletic Association.

=== Cricket ===
Darbhanga District Cricket Association(DDCA), headquartered at Nehru Stadium, Lahariasarai is the local unit affiliated to Bihar Cricket Association and there are 18 clubs affiliated within it.

=== Football ===
Darbhanga District Football Association(DDFA) is the local unit affiliated to Bihar Football Association and headquartered at Mahtha Kothi, Gaushala Road, P.O. Ramna, Muzaffarpur .

=== Badminton ===
Darbhanga District Badminton Association(DDBA) is affiliated with the Bihar Badminton Association.

=== Chess ===
Darbhanga District Chess Association is local unit and affiliated to All Bihar Chess Association.

=== Taekwando ===
Darbhanga Taekwando Association is local unit and affiliated to Bihar Taekwando Association.

=== Kabaddi ===
Darbhanga District level Association is affiliated to Bihar State Kabaddi Association.

=== Para sports ===
Darbhanga District Para Sports Association is affiliated to Bihar Para Sports Association.

== Transportation ==
Train routes originating from Darbhanga

=== Air ===
Darbhanga Aviation was a private Indian airline started by Maharaja Kameshwar Singh of Darbhanga and was operational from 1950 (76 years ago) to 1962 (64 years ago).

Darbhanga has a airport in main city which has regular flights to cities like Delhi, Mumbai, Bengaluru and Hyderabad.

=== Rail ===
Darbhanga railway station was started in 1892. It lies in Eastern Central Railway Zone and has direct connectivity with many major cities of India, refer image, red dot represent Darbhanga.

=== Road ===
India's second longest national highway NH27(also known as East West Corridor) crosses Darbhanga, which provides smoother connectivity to the eastern and western part of India. Other national highway like NH322, NH527E connects it with rest of Bihar. There are multiple state highway providing inter district connectivity. One expressway is under construction, it'll connect Darbhanga directly to Patna.

== See also ==
- Ahalya Sthan
- Kusheshwar Asthan Bird Wildlife Sanctuary
- Bahera
- Bathai
- Bauram
- Bhapura
- Chandih
- Chhatwan
- Gautam Ashram
- Keoti
- Kumai
- Kusheshwar Asthan
- Panchobh
- Raj Darbhanga
- Ratanpur Abhiman
- Supaul Bazar
- Mahathwar
- Tariyani
- Tatuar
- Gautam Kund
- Kopagarh
