= Panchobh =

- village
- Location in Bihar, India Panchobh (India)
- Coordinates: 26.122067°N 85.816930°E
- Country: India
- State: Bihar
- Region: Mithila
- District: Darbhanga

Languages
  - Official: Maithili, Hindi, Urdu
- Time zone: UTC+5:30 (IST)
- PIN: 846001
- Telephone code: 06272 260_ _ _
- Literacy: More Than Eighty (80) Percent
- Lok Sabha constituency: Darbhanga
- Vidhan Sabha constituency: Bahadurpur

Panchobh is a village in Darbhanga District, Bihar, India. It is one of the largest villages in the Mithila Region by area and population. The town of Laheriasarai, the administrative headquarters of Darbhanga district, is eight kilometers to the east. The name of the village comes from the ancestor Sri Panchu Baba, who established the village.

== Geography ==
Floods occur in the area in July and August, and cause damage. The main commerce of the village is agriculture.

== Demographics ==
Maithili is the spoken language of Panchobh. Brahmin dominate the village population, and several other castes live in nearby villages. Other castes present in the village are: Rajput, Yadav, Dhanuk, Badhay (carpenter), Khatvay, Muslim, Nai, Dhobi, Kumhar and others. In Mahnauli, Rajputs are in the majority.

== Transport ==
Panchobh is located beside State Highway 50 (SH 50), to Samastipur. Panchobh is also located alongside the National Highway 57 (NH 57) near Simri, which goes to Porbandar (Gujarat) and Guwahati, Assam. Panchobh is 8.5 km from Laheriasarai station, and 14 km from Darbhanga station.

== Education ==
Panchobh has a high school, a middle school, a primary school, and a Saraswati Sishu Mandir.

Dev Narayan High School (DN High School) was established in the village in 1957, near the Rajwan of Dihrampur Village. The school is named after D.N. Jha (Birla), a local businessman.

== Political representation ==
Panchobh is in the Darbhanga constituency. Gopalji Thakur of the BJP is the MP. Panchobh comes under Bahadurpur MLA constituency. Madan Sahni of the JDU is the MLA since 2020.

== Temples ==
Temples in Panchobh include:

- Bhola baba mandir - known as "Sivala"
- Brahm baba mandir - Known as "Baba Dihbar"
- Ram-janki mandir - known as "Shthal"
- Mata Durga sthan - Panchobh celebrates Durga Puja here every year.

Panchobh also has its own Shmashana behind Maa Durga Sthan.
