= Benipur Assembly constituency =

Benipur
- Constituency No. 80 - for the State Legislative Assembly

Constituency details
- Country: India
- State: Bihar
- District: Darbhanga
- Established: 1967
- Total electors: 300,497
- Reservation: None

Member of Legislative Assembly
- Incumbent Binay Kumar Choudhary
- Party: JD(U)
- Alliance: NDA
- Elected year: 2025

Benipur Assembly constituency is an assembly constituency in Darbhanga district of Bihar, India.

== Overview ==
As per Delimitation of Parliamentary and Assembly constituencies Order, 2008, No. 80 Benipur Assembly constituency is composed of the following: Benipur community development block;Baheri CD Block;Biraul CD Block.

Benipur (Nagar Parisad (Navtoliya Chairman Mateen Mustafa) & Deputy Chairman's Md Nazim Amin (Assembly constituency) is part of No. 14 Darbhanga (Lok Sabha constituency).

== Members of the Legislative Assembly ==
Year	Name	Party
1967	Bhup Narayan Jha	Indian National Congress
1969	Hari Nath Mishra	Lok Tantrik Congress
1972	Hari Nath Mishra	Indian National Congress
1977-2008: Constituency did not exist
2010	Gopal Jee Thakur	Bharatiya Janata Party
2015	Sunil Choudhary	Janata Dal (United)
2020	Binay Kumar Choudhary	Janata Dal (United)
2025	Binay Kumar Choudhary	Janata Dal (United)

== Election results ==
=== 2025 ===
2025 Bihar Legislative Assembly election: Benipur
Party	Candidate	Votes	%	±%
JD(U)	Binay Kumar Choudhary	84,207	44.7	+7.12
INC	Mithilesh Kumar Chaudhary	70,604	37.48	+3.93
JSP	Amresh Kumar Amar	6,558	3.48	
Independent	Chun Chun Jha	6,532	3.47	
Independent	Avadhesh Kumar Jha	5,428	2.88	
Independent	Mahendra Narayan Mahto	4,457	2.37	
BSP	Pramod Paswan	2,001	1.06	
NOTA	None of the above	3,108	1.65	−1.18
Majority		13,603	7.22	+3.19
Turnout		188,366	62.68	+6.17
JD(U) hold		Swing		

=== 2020 ===
2020 Bihar Legislative Assembly election: Benipur
Party	Candidate	Votes	%	±%
JD(U)	Binay Kumar Choudhary	61,416	37.58	−9.3
INC	Mithilesh Kumar Chaudhary	54,826	33.55	
LJP	Kamal Ram Vinod Jha	17,616	10.78	
Independent	Ram Kumar Jha	6,221	3.81	
RLSP	Rajeev Kumar	4,641	2.84	
Independent	Sanjeet Kumar	3,741	2.29	
Independent	Saguni Ray	3,082	1.89	
Wazib Adhikar Party	Nathuni Ram	1,929	1.18	
JAP(L)	Rajesh Kumar Mishra	1,576	0.96	
NOTA	None of the above	4,621	2.83	−0.28
Majority		6,590	4.03	−13.81
Turnout		163,428	56.51	+0.89
JD(U) hold		Swing		

=== 2015 ===
Bihar Assembly election, 2015: Benipur
Party	Candidate	Votes	%	±%
JD(U)	Sunil Chaudhary	69,511	46.88	
BJP	Gopal Jee Thakur	43,068	29.04	
Independent	Kamalramvinod Jha "Kamal Seth"	10,154	6.85	
Independent	Vinod Kumar Jha	6,061	4.09	
Independent	Siyalakhan Yadav	2,459	1.66	
Independent	Sunil Kumar Jha "Moti Babu"	2,340	1.58	
CPI	Ram Naresh Roy	2,299	1.55	
BSP	Laxman Ram	1,685	1.14	
Independent	Vinoda Nand Jha	1,385	0.93	
Sarvajan Kalyan Loktantrik Party	Krishna Kant Jha	1,350	0.91	
NOTA	None of the above	4,614	3.11	
Majority		26,443	17.84	
Turnout		148,283	55.62	

=== 2010 ===
Bihar Assembly election, 2010: Benipur
Party	Candidate	Votes	%	±%
BJP	Gopal Jee Thakur	43,222	40.33	
RJD	Hare Krishna Yadav	29,265	27.31	
Majority		13,957		
Turnout		107,175	47.27	
BJP hold		Swing		
