= Bauram =

- village
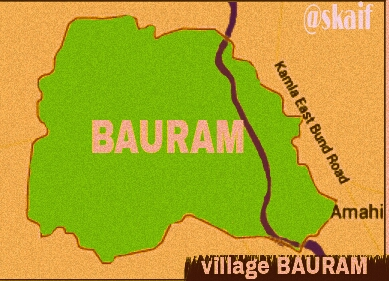
- Map of village Bauram

- Location in Bihar, India
- Coordinates: 25°58′26″N 86°19′11″E
- Country: India
- State: Bihar
- District: Darbhanga
- Region: Mithila
- Sub division: Biraul
- Police station: Jamalpur
- Outpost (O.P.): Badgaaon
- Settled in: 1600 A.D.

Government
  - Type: Gram panchayat
  - Body: Sarpanch

Area (approx)
  - Total: 4 km^{2} (1.5 sq mi)
- Elevation (above sea level): 79 m (259 ft)

Population (2011 Census of India)
  - Total: 11,455
  - Density: 2,900/km^{2} (7,400/sq mi)

Languages
  - Official: Maithili, Hindi, Urdu
- Time zone: UTC+5:30 (IST)
- PIN: 847203
- Telephone code: 06272

Bauram is a large village located in Darbhanga, Bihar, India. It is situated about 60 km east of the district headquarters and 10 km east of the sub-divisional headquarters. The area of Bauram is about 2400 bighas (961 acres ~4 km^{2}).

The main language of the village is Maithili. The majority of people living in Bauram are involved in agriculture where the main crops include wheat, barley, coriander, maize, mung bean, pigeon pea, cucumber, and sweet potato. In earlier times, gram (chana) provided good yields in the village.

== Political ==
Panchayat	Bauram
Block	Gora Bauram
Vidhansabha (legislative assembly) constituency	Gaura Bauram (Vidhan Sabha constituency)
Lok Sabha (parliamentary) constituency	Darbhanga (Lok Sabha constituency)

=== Current political results ===
Member of Parliament (MP)	Gopal Jee Thakur
Member of legislative assembly (MLA)	Sawarna Singh
Mukhiya	Motiur-Rahman
Sarpanch	Ramvilas Gupta
Block Pramukh	Mamta Devi
Panchayat Samiti Member	Tarannum Khanam

== History of the village ==
Bauram was first discovered when India was under the rule of the Mughal Empire by a Jagdeeshpur Siwan's resident, Laung Chaudhary. Initially, he reached what was seen to be a village Asi (3–4 km west to the village). Laung Chaudhary's second and third generations discovered the village when they were searching for their cattle's feed, where they found a heap of green grass. They thought about living in the village because it was the place where they can easily build their shelter from the surplus reeds available. They built shacks into colonies which are now known as "gaaon par (home)." Laung Chaudhary was a Hindu (Brahmin) before he became a Muslim (sheik), and this was the reason beyond the migration from Jagdishpur to Asi.

== Demographics ==
- There are about 2,297 families residing in Bauram; it has a total population of 11,455, in which 5,849 are males and 5,606 are females.
- For every 1000 males, there are 958 females. For every 1000 males age 18 and over, there are 975 females.
- Bauram has a lower literacy than the average in Bihar. In 2011, the literacy rate of Bauram was 43.85% compared to the 61.80% for the whole of Bihar. In Bauram, male literacy stands at 52.15%, while the female literacy rate is 35.15%.

== Languages and culture ==
The language spoken in Bauram is Maithili. Both Hindu and Muslim have their own style of dialect. Durga puja and Chhath are the most celebrated festivals among Hindus. where as Muslims celebrate Eid ul-fitr and Eid al-Adha. In Bauram village, there are eight mosques, including Jama Masjid (The oldest mosque in Bauram), and two temples: Bhagwati asthan and Babaji Kuti.

== Available public services ==
The new generation of the village inhabitants have a higher rate of education. Bauram has a primary school, a middle school, a high school, and the Kasturba Gandhi Balika Vidyalaya. There are many mobile towers which make mobile communication and internet services stronger. Furthermore, there are many Anganwadi centers in Bauram, and an active primary health center with a 24-hour ambulance service. Bharat Gas Agency Name (Baby Gas Gramin Vitrak) is also situated in it.

Regarding the future ones, there is a water tank being completed and is going to be started in few days.
