= Haridih, Darbhanga =

Village in Bihar, India

Haridih
- Village
- Location within Bihar Location within India
- Coordinates: 26°00′20″N 86°06′37″E
- Country: India
- State: Bihar
- District: Darbhanga
- Block: Baheri

Government
  - Type: Sarpanch

Area
  - Total: 28.68 km^{2} (11.07 sq mi)
- Elevation: 54 m (177 ft)

Population (2011)
  - Total: 32,612
  - Density: 1,137/km^{2} (2,945/sq mi)

Languages
  - Common: Maithili, Hindi
- Time zone: UTC+5:30 (IST)
- PIN: 847201
- STD code: 06272
- Vehicle registration: BR-07

Haridih, or Habidih, is a village in northern Bihar, India. It belongs to Baheri Block, in the south of Darbhanga District. The village had a population of 32,612 as of the 2011 census.

== Geography ==
Haridih lies approximately 27 kilometres southeast of the district capital Darbhanga. The village spans an area of 2,868 hectares.

== Demographics ==
Haridih had a reported 32,612 inhabitants at the end of 2011, among whom 17,171 were males and 15,441 were females. The working population made up 35% of the total population. The overall literacy rate was 43.23%, with 9,390 of the male population and 4,707 of the female population being literate.
