= Sidhauli, Darbhanga =

Salimpur Sidhauli
- village
- Location in Bihar, India Salimpur Sidhauli (India)
- Country: India
- State: Bihar

Population
  - Total: 4,000

Languages
  - Official: urdu, Hindi, Urdu, English
- Time zone: UTC+5:30 (IST)
- ISO 3166 code: IN-BR
- Vehicle registration: BR07
- Nearest city: LaheriSarsi, Darbhanga
- Sex ratio: 960 ♂/♀
- Literacy: 80%%
- Lok Sabha constituency: Samastipur
- Avg. summer temperature: 45 °C (113 °F)
- Avg. winter temperature: 10 °C (50 °F)

Sidhauli is a village located 4 km North of the town of laheriasari, in the Hayaghat block of darbhanga, Bihar state, India. It is governed by a Salimpur Sidhauli Panchayat. The population of the village is 4,000 (52% male, 48% female; approximate even split between Hindus and Muslims). All of the Muslim population follow Deobandi ideology. The languages spoken in the village are Urdu, Hindi and English.

The village has many schools - Al Fatima Public School, Sidhauli Middle School, ‘’ sanskar valley the scholl’’,’’bal Bharti public school’’and Sidhauli Urdu Maqtab. The main occupation of the people is trade and business. People of this village are very friendly in nature and support each other. in Salimpur Sidhauli left (West) side of main road is known as Madhu Patti while the right (East) side is known as beech (middle)Mohalla & (north) side is known as Eidgah mohalla while (south) side is knows as kabristan mohalla. The main road works as dividing boundaries for these villages. Dr. Ramchandra Prasad Member of Vidhan Sabha is also residence of Sidhauli. In various government files Sidhauli is known by Salimpur, Sidhauli, singhauli and Sidhouli.
