= Gaura Bauram Assembly constituency =

Coordinates: 25°59′06″N 86°19′55″E

Gaura Bauram
- Constituency No. 79 - for the Bihar Legislative Assembly

Constituency details
- Country: India
- Region: East India
- State: Bihar
- District: Darbhanga
- Established: 2008
- Total electors: 261,738
- Reservation: None

Member of Legislative Assembly
- 18th Bihar Legislative Assembly
- Incumbent Sujit Singh
- Party: BJP
- Alliance: NDA
- Elected year: 2025

Gaura Bauram Assembly constituency is an assembly constituency in Darbhanga district in the Indian state of Bihar.

== Overview ==
As per Delimitation of Parliamentary and Assembly constituencies Order, 2008, No. 79 Gaura Bauram Assembly constituency is composed of the following: Gaura Bauram and Kiratpur community development blocks; Kothram, Jamalpur, Bauram, Neuri, Bhawanipur, Rohar Mahmuda, Parri, Ramnagar, Itwa Shivnagar, Supaul, Biraul, Sahsaram, and Saho gram panchayats of Biraul CD Block.

Gaura Bauram Assembly constituency is part of No.14 Darbhanga (Lok Sabha constituency).

The block consist of 13 panchayats: Kasround Karkouli, Aasi, Adharpur, Bauram, Goura Mansingh, Kanhai, Kasrour Basouli, Kasrour Belwara, Kumai, Mansara, Nadai, Nari, and South Kasround Karkouli.

== Members of the Legislative Assembly ==
Year	Name	Party
Until 2008: Constituency did not exist
2010	Izhar Ahmed	Janata Dal (United)
2015	Madan Sahni	Janata Dal (United)
2020	Swarna Singh	Vikassheel Insaan Party
2020	Swarna Singh	Bharatiya Janata Party
2025	Sujit Singh	Bharatiya Janata Party

== Election results ==
=== 2025 ===
2025 Bihar Legislative Assembly election: Gaura Bauram
Party	Candidate	Votes	%	±%
BJP	Sujit Singh	77,682	46.18	
RJD	Afzal Ali Khan	72,013	42.81	+6.6
Independent	Shyam Sundar Choudhary	6,549	3.89	
NOTA	Non of the above	3,663	2.18	+1.65
AIMIM	Akhtar Shahansha	3,243	1.93	
JSP	Dr Md. Iftekhar Alam	2,506	1.49	
NOTA	None of the above	3,663	2.18	+1.65
Majority		5,669	3.37	−1.68
Turnout		168,223	64.27	+7.08
BJP gain from VIP		Swing		

=== 2020 ===
2020 Bihar Legislative Assembly election: Gaura Bauram
Party	Candidate	Votes	%	±%
VIP	Swarna Singh	59,538	41.26	
RJD	Afzal Ali Khan	52,258	36.21	
LJP	Rajeev Kumar Thakur	9,123	6.32	−24.7
Independent	Dr Izhar Ahmad	5,485	3.8	
Independent	Rajni Mahato	3,407	2.36	
Independent	Md Isarafil	1,944	1.35	
Mithilanchal Mukti Morcha	Saroj Kumar Chaudhary	1,685	1.17	
NOTA	None of the above	770	0.53	−5.29
Majority		7,280	5.05	−6.63
Turnout		144,300	57.19	+4.56
VIP gain from JD(U)		Swing		

=== 2015 ===
Bihar Assembly election, 2015: Gaura Bauram
Party	Candidate	Votes	%	±%
JD(U)	Madan Sahni	51,403	42.7	
LJP	Vinod Sahni	37,341	31.02	
Independent	Randhir Chaudhary	6,218	5.17	
Independent	Mohammad Nisar Alam	5,725	4.76	
BSP	Binod Kumar Mandal	3,050	2.53	
Independent	Prabhakar Thakur	2,461	2.04	
CPI(ML)L	Asarfi Das	1,665	1.38	
JAP(L)	Mohammad Ramij Alee Khan	1,435	1.19	
NOTA	None of the above	7,000	5.82	
Majority		14,062	11.68	
Turnout		120,370	52.63	
