= Rampurdih =

Rampurdih Dihrampur
- village
- Country: India
- State: Bihar

Languages
  - Official: Maithili, Hindi, Urdu
- Time zone: UTC+5:30 (IST)
- PIN: 846003
- Telephone code: 916272 260_ _ _
- ISO 3166 code: IN-BR
- Nearest city: Darbhanga
- Lok sabha constituency: Darbhanga
- Vidhan sabha constituency: Hanumannagar

Rampurdih, also known as Dihrampur, is a village in Darbhanga, Bihar state, India. The village is divided into two Tola known as Utharwari Tola and Dakhsinwari Tola. The village comes under the Rampurdih panchayat.

== See also ==
- Panchobh
