= Kusheshwar Asthan =

- Town
- Location in Bihar
- Coordinates: 25°47′46″N 86°17′06″E
- Country: India
- State: Bihar
- Region: Mithila
- District: Darbhanga District

Government
  - Type: Municipality
  - Body: Nagar Panchayat
  - MP: Shambhavi Choudhary
  - MLA: Atirek Kumar

Population (2011)
  - Total: 17,285

Languages
  - Official: Maithili, Hindi
- Time zone: UTC+5:30 (IST)
- PIN: 848213
- Vehicle registration: BR07
- Lok Sabha constituency: Samastipur (Lok Sabha constituency)
- assembly constituency: Kusheshwar Asthan (Vidhan Sabha constituency)
- Website: https://darbhanga.nic.in/subdivision-blocks/

Kusheshwar Asthan is a town and a notified area of the Darbhanga in the Indian state of Bihar. It is a holy sacred place of Hinduism. It is one of the most Famous Hindu temple Baba Kusheshwar Nath.

== Religious significance ==
Kusheshwar Asthan, also known as Baba Kusheshwar Nath, is an important Hindu pilgrimage site. and is famous for the mela of Shrawan, 4th month according to the Hindu calendar system. Baba Kusheshwar Nath Temple is located in the eastern district of Darbhanga, Bihar, which is about 70 km southeast of the district headquarters. This temple is also known as Baba Dham of Mithila. It is situated at the confluence of three rivers and is dedicated to Lord Shiva. Many devotees come to the temple every day to worship and offer prayers. The temple doors open every day at 4 am. There is a sacred well called Chandrakup (well) in the temple complex. It is believed that just by entering the temple, devotees feel a sense of peace. Lord Shiva fulfills the wishes of all devotees who come here.

== See also ==
- Kusheshwar Asthan Bird Wildlife Sanctuary
