= Biraul subdivision =

Administrative subdivision in Darbhanga district, Bihar, India

- Subdivision
- Location in Bihar, India Biraul subdivision (India)
- Coordinates: 25.9277880°N 86.2484362°E
- Country: India
- State: Bihar
- District: Darbhanga
- Headquarters: Dumri Biraul

Area
  - Total: 181 km^{2} (70 sq mi)

Population (2011)
  - Total: 286,113
  - Density: 1,580/km^{2} (4,090/sq mi)

Languages
  - Official: Hindi, Urdu
  - Regional: Maithili
- Time zone: UTC+5:30 (IST)
- Postal code: 847203
- Vehicle registration: BR

Biraul subdivision is an administrative subdivision of Darbhanga district in the Indian state of Bihar. It was created in 1992 with its headquarters at Dumri Biraul.

== Geography ==
Biraul subdivision lies in the south-eastern part of Darbhanga district, within the alluvial plains of the Mithila region. The area is characterised by fertile but flood-prone terrain, with seasonal inundation common during the monsoon. The Central Ground Water Board notes that Darbhanga district (including Biraul subdivision) falls in a flood-affected zone with shallow aquifers and high groundwater fluctuations. According to the Census of India 2011, the total area of Biraul subdivision is about 181 km².

== Administration ==
Biraul is one of the three subdivisions of Darbhanga district (along with Darbhanga Sadar and Benipur). It consists of six Community Development Blocks:

- Biraul block
- Ghanshyampur block
- Gora Bauram block
- Kiratpur block
- Kusheshwar Asthan block
- Kusheshwar Asthan East block

== Demographics ==
As per the 2011 Census of India, Biraul subdivision has a population of 286,113, all of which is rural. Of this population, 149,326 are males and 136,787 are females, yielding a sex ratio of about 916 females per 1,000 males. The overall literacy rate is 53.3%, with male literacy at 65.08% and female literacy at 40.35%. Scheduled Castes constitute about 19% of the population and Scheduled Tribes less than 0.1%.

== Economy ==
The economy of Biraul subdivision is primarily agrarian, with the majority of workers engaged in cultivation and agricultural labour. Ancillary activities include animal husbandry, fisheries and household industries, as recorded in the District Census Handbook. Further industrial and small-scale unit details are provided in official Industrial Potential Surveys of the Ministry of MSME/Directorate of Industries when published.

== Transport ==
The subdivision is connected by rural and district roads linking block headquarters to Dumri Biraul and the district headquarters at Darbhanga. The District Census Handbook records road and transport facilities available in villages. The area is also served by Biraul Railway Station, which links it to Darbhanga via the Sakri–Biraul branch line, as per Indian Railways operational documents (to be cited when official railway timetable references are used).

== Education and public services ==
According to the District Census Handbook, Biraul subdivision has government primary schools, middle schools, secondary schools, and health centres distributed across its villages. The subdivision headquarters Dumri Biraul hosts a government hospital and higher secondary institutions, as recorded in official district directories.

== See also ==
- Darbhanga district
- Biraul
