= Gautam Kund =

Legendary Kund attributed to Gautama

Coordinates: 26°18′42″N 85°47′07″E

- गौतम कुण्ड

Religion
- Affiliation: Hinduism
- District: Darbhanga
- Deity: Goddess Ganga
- Festival: Maghi Purnima

Location
- Location: Brahmpur West Panchayat, Mithila region
- State: Bihar
- Country: India
- Interactive map of Gautam Kund

Architecture
- Founder: Maharshi Gautama
- Established: Treta Yuga

Website
- https://www.gautamkund.in/

Gautam Kund (Maithili: गौतम कुण्ड ) is a legendary lake in the Mithila region attributed to the Vedic sage Maharshi Gautama. It is located in Kamtaul City of the Darbhanga district of Bihar in India. It is famous for sacred bath among Hindu adherents in the region. A large number of devotees flock into the lake during the occasion of the Maghi Purnima for performing sacred bath in it. The Gautam Kund is associated with the epic Ramayana. It is near the ancient Gautam Ashram. It is believed that Gautam Rishi used to come to this place every morning from his ashram to took bath and got engrossed in meditation. The adherents believe that after taking a sacred bath in the Kund, the sins of ones lives vanish.

== Description ==
According to legend, once there was a drought in the Mithila region due to Indra's anger. The sages were left with nothing to eat or drink, then the sage Gautama created a Ksheer Kund with his wish-fulfilling vessel and his spiritual powers. The Kund was brought by the sage Gautama as a symbolic Ganga near his ashram so it is also known as Gautami Ganga.
