= Amitabh Singh =

Indian Space Scientist

- Born: Kubauli, Samastipur, Bihar, India
- Education: Anugrah Narayan College, Patna, Birla Institute of Technology Mesra
- Known for: Mission Chandrayaan 1, Chandrayaan 2 and Chandrayaan-3 and Planetary Geomatics
- Spouse: Dr Mamata Singh
- Awards: ISRS Young Achiever Award (2008) Rastriya Vigyan team award Laurels of Team Achievement for Chandrayaan-3 by International Academy of Astronautics
- Scientific career
- Fields: Space Technology; Potential Landing Sites for Chandrayaan-2 Lander in Southern Hemisphere of Moon
- Workplaces: Indian Space Research Organisation
- Website: https://www.researchgate.net/profile/Amitabh-Singh

Amitabh Singh is an Indian Space Scientist. He was project manager for Chandrayaan-1 Mission and deputy project director and operations director for Chandrayaan-2 and Chandrayaan-3 mission of ISRO. He handled the optical payload data processing and on-board algorithm related to Chandrayaan-2 and Chandrayaan-3 Lander and Rover. He is also a guest faculty at Department of Physics, Electronics & Space Science of the Gujarat University. He is working for upcoming Chandrayaan missions.

He is presently the chairman of the Planetary and Space Science Data Processing Division. He is also associated with the Venus Orbiter Mission at the Space Applications Centre (ISRO) in Ahmedabad.

He has authored some books on Chandrayaan 1 and articles on Planetary Geomatics and Exploring the Moon in three dimension.

He has been awarded the ISRS Young Achiever Award by the Indian Society of Remote Sensing, Dehradun. He was also Part of Chandrayaan-3 team who received Rastriya Vigyan team award 2024.

== Biography ==
Amitabh Singh was born at Kubauli village of Samastipur district in Bihar. His wife is a senior doctor.

Singh holds an M.Sc (Electronics) from The Department of Physics, Anugrah Narayan College Patna. He also studied M.Tech from Birla Institute of Technology, Mesra.

== Bibliography ==
- Chandrayaan-1 se liye gaye Chandrama Ke Pratibimb, ISBN 978-81-909978-8-1
- Images of Moon from Chandrayaan-1, ISBN 978-81-909978-3-6

== Awards ==
- ISRS Young Achiever Award (2008)
- 2024 Laurels for Team Achievement Award for Chandrayaan-3 by The International Academy of Astronautics (IAA) (2024)
- Rastriya Vigyan Team Award 2024 for Chandrayaan-3 Team (2024)
