= Chandih =

- Village
- Location in Bihar, India Chandih (India)
- Coordinates: 26°07′17.8″N 85°52′20.6″E
- Country: India
- State: Bihar
- Region: Mithila
- District: Darbhanga

Government
  - Type: Panchayati raj (India)
  - Body: Gram panchayat

Population
  - Total: 5,000+

Languages
  - Official: Urdu, Hindi, Maithili, English
- Time zone: UTC+5:30 (IST)
- PIN Code: 846003
- Telephone Code: 06272
- ISO 3166 code: IN-BR
- Vehicle registration: BR-07
- Nearest city: Darbhanga, Madhubani, Muzaffarpur, Samastipur
- Sex ratio: 950 ♂/♀
- Literacy: 55%

Chandih is a village in Bahadurpur Block, Darbhanga District, Mithila, Bihar, India.

== Geography ==
Nearby places are Ekmighat Chowk (0.2 km), Ojhaul (0.5 km), Taralahi (1.5 km), Godhiyari (1.5 km), Mustafapur (2 km), .Laheriasarai (2.5 km). Nearest Towns are Darbhanga (4 km), Madhubani (50 km), Muzaffarpur (70 km), Samastipur (37 km)

== Education ==
- M.R. Public School
- Primary School (North)
- Primary School (West)

== Transport ==
Nearby Roadways is Ekmi-Sobhan (SH-50 to NH-57) Bypass Road crosses through the village. The nearby state highway is State Highway 50 (Bihar) (0.2 Km) and nearby national highway is National Highway 57 (India) (10 km) The nearest railway station is Laheriasarai Railway Station, which distance is 4.5 Km.

== Mosque in Chandih ==
- Jama Masjid
- Fatima Masjid
