= Kusheshwar Asthan Assembly constituency =

Constituency of the Bihar legislative assembly in India

Kusheshwar Asthan
- Constituency No. 78 for the Bihar Legislative Assembly

Constituency details
- Country: India
- Region: East India
- State: Bihar
- District: Darbhanga
- Lok Sabha constituency: Samastipur
- Established: 2008
- Total electors: 259,912
- Reservation: SC

Member of Legislative Assembly
- 18th Bihar Legislative Assembly
- Incumbent Atirek Kumar
- Party: JD(U)
- Alliance: NDA
- Elected year: 2025
- Preceded by: Aman Bhushan Hajari

Kusheshwar Asthan is an assembly constituency in Darbhanga district in the Indian state of Bihar, headquartered in the town of Kusheshwar Asthan. It is reserved for Scheduled Castes.

== Overview ==
As per Delimitation of Parliamentary and Assembly constituencies Order, 2008, No. 78 Kusheshwar Asthan Assembly constituency (SC) is composed of the following: Kusheshwar Asthan and Kusheshwar Asthan Purbi community development blocks; Uchhti, Afzala, Akbarpur Baink, Sonpur Paghari, Ganaura Tarwara, Ladaho, Pokhram North and Pokhram South of Biraul CD Block.

Kusheshwar Asthan Assembly constituency (SC) is part of No. 23 Samastipur Lok Sabha constituency (SC).

== Member of legislative Assembly ==
Year	Name	Party
Until 2008: Constituency did not exist
2010	Shashi Bhushan Hazari	Bharatiya Janata Party
2015	Shashi Bhushan Hazari	Janata Dal (United)
2020	Shashi Bhushan Hazari	Janata Dal (United)
2021^	Aman Bhushan Hajari	Janata Dal (United)
2025	Atirek Kumar	Janata Dal (United)

^by-election

== Election results ==
=== 2025 ===
2025 Bihar Legislative Assembly election: Kusheshwar Asthan
Party	Candidate	Votes	%	±%
JD(U)	Atirek Kumar	85,685	52.25	▲12.7
Independent	Ganesh Bharti	49,244	30.03	
JSP	Shatrudhan Paswan	6,488	3.96	
Mazdoor Ekta Party	Satya Narayan Paswan	5,127	3.13	
AAP	Yogi Chaupal	3,464	2.11	
Independent	Sachidanand Paswan	2,171	1.32	
Independent	Shreemati Anju Devi	2,142	1.31	
NOTA	None of the above	6,451	3.93	▲1.63
Majority		36,441	22.22	▲16.93
Turnout		163,976	63.09	▲8.67
JD(U) hold		Swing		

=== 2021 bypoll ===
By-election, 2021: Kusheshwar Asthan
Party	Candidate	Votes	%	±%
JD(U)	Aman Bhushan Hajari	59,887	45.72	+6.17
RJD	Ganesh Bharti	47,192	36.02	New
LJP	Anju Devi	5,623	4.29	−5.50
INC	Atirek Kumar	5,603	4.28	−29.98
Independent	Jibachh Kumar Hajari	3,200	2.44	
SAP	Sachchidanand Paswan	2,596	1.98	
JAP(L)	Yogi Chaupal	2,211	1.69	
Independent	Ram Bahadur Azad	1,789	1.37	
NOTA	None of the above	2,899	2.21	
Margin of victory		12,695	9.70	
Turnout		1,31,007	50.92	
JD(U) hold		Swing		

=== 2020 ===
Bihar Assembly election, 2020: Kusheshwar Asthan
Party	Candidate	Votes	%	±%
JD(U)	Shashi Bhushan Hazari	53,980	39.55	▼3.52
INC	Ashok Kumar	46,758	34.26	
LJP	Poonam Kumari	13,362	9.79	▼16.2
Independent	Kameshwar Ram	3,864	2.83	
Independent	Yogi Chaupal	3,489	2.56	
Log Jan Party Secular	Lal Mohar Sada	2,117	1.55	
RLSP	Laxmi Paswan	2,060	1.51	
JAP(L)	Murari Paswan	1,805	1.32	▼1.13
Independent	Ganesh Kumar	1,392	1.02	
NOTA	None of the above	3,142	2.3	▼3.88
Majority		7,222	5.29	▼11.79
Turnout		136,481	54.42	▲3.28
JD(U) hold		Swing		

=== 2015 ===
2015 Bihar Legislative Assembly election: Kusheshwar Asthan
Party	Candidate	Votes	%	±%
JD(U)	Shashi Bhushan Hazari	50,062	43.07	
LJP	Dhananjay Kumar (A) Mrinal Paswan	30,212	25.99	
CPI	Rajendra Prasad	5,706	4.91	
Independent	Vinay Kumar	4,678	4.02	
Independent	Ganesh Kumar Alias Ganesh Kumar Paswan	3,733	3.21	
BSP	Kameshwar Ram	3,570	3.07	
JAP(L)	Shyam Sundar Sardar	2,850	2.45	
Independent	Bhupesh Bhuwan Bharti Alias Pappu Paswan	2,772	2.38	
Garib Janta Dal (Secular)	Rajesh Paswan	2,105	1.81	
Sarvajan Kalyan Loktantrik Party	Turanti Sada	1,779	1.53	
Bharat Nirman Party	Lal Mohar Sada	1,586	1.36	
NOTA	None of the above	7,183	6.18	
Majority		19,850	17.08	
Turnout		116,236	51.14	
JD(U) gain from BJP		Swing		

=== 2010 ===
2010 Bihar Legislative Assembly election: Kusheshwar Asthan
Party	Candidate	Votes	%	±%
BJP	Shashi Bhushan Hajari	28,576	31.58	
LJP	Ramchandra Paswan	23,064	25.49	
INC	Ashok Kumar	17,142	18.95	
IND	Ramottar Paswan	7,549	8.34	
IND	Ram Bahadur Bharti	3,084	3.41	
Majority		5,512	6.09	
Turnout		90,475	45.59	
BJP win (new seat)				
