= Bahadurpur Assembly constituency =

Coordinates: 26°06′06″N 85°53′54″E

Bahadurpur
- Constituency No. 85 - for the Bihar Legislative Assembly

Constituency details
- Country: India
- Region: East India
- State: Bihar
- District: Darbhanga
- Established: 2008
- Total electors: 310,848
- Reservation: None

Member of Legislative Assembly
- 18th Bihar Legislative Assembly
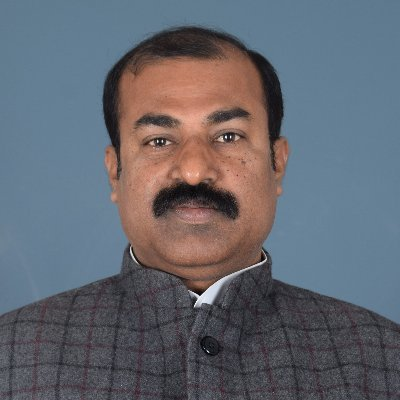
- Incumbent Madan Sahni
- Party: JD(U)
- Alliance: NDA
- Elected year: 2025

Bahadurpur Assembly constituency is an assembly constituency in Darbhanga district in the Indian state of Bihar.

== Overview ==
As per Delimitation of Parliamentary and Assembly constituencies Order, 2008, No. 85 Bahadurpur Assembly constituency is composed of the following: Bahadurpur and Hanuman Nagar community development blocks.

Bahadurpur Assembly constituency is part of No. 14 Darbhanga (Lok Sabha constituency).

== Members of the Legislative Assembly ==
Year	Name	Party
Until 2008: Constituency did not exist
2010	Madan Sahni	Janata Dal (United)
2015	Bhola Yadav	Rashtriya Janata Dal
2020	Madan Sahni	Janata Dal (United)
2025	Madan Sahni	Janata Dal (United)

== Election results ==
=== 2025 ===
Bihar Assembly election, 2025: Bahadurpur
Party	Candidate	Votes	%	±%
JD(U)	Madan Sahni	96,300	45.24	+6.74
RJD	Bhola Yadav	84,289	39.6	+2.57
Independent	Ram Chatur Sahni	6,312	2.97	
JSP	Mohammad Amir Haider	5,579	2.62	
BSP	Pranay Prabhakar Alias Rahul Jee	2,759	1.3	
Independent	Vinai Kumar Singh	2,379	1.12	
Independent	Ram Gulam Thakur	2,320	1.09	
NOTA	None of the above	1,993	0.94	−1.24
Majority		12,011	5.64	+4.17
Turnout		212,863	70.52	+11.18
JD(U) hold		Swing		

=== 2020 ===
Bihar Assembly election, 2020: Bahadurpur
Party	Candidate	Votes	%	±%
JD(U)	Madan Sahni	68,538	38.5	
RJD	Ramesh Chaudhary	65,909	37.03	−8.92
LJP	Devendra Kumar Jha	16,873	9.48	
Independent	Binay Kumar Singh	4,938	2.77	
Independent	Baldeo Ram	3,570	2.01	
Bhartiya Sablog Party	Vikram Singh	2,443	1.37	
Independent	Mahendra Sahani	2,288	1.29	
Rashtriya Jan Jan Party	Ram Prabhanjan Choudhary	1,699	0.95	
NOTA	None of the above	3,873	2.18	−0.97
Majority		2,629	1.47	−9.44
Turnout		178,011	59.34	+1.42
JD(U) gain from RJD		Swing		

=== 2015 ===
Bihar Assembly election, 2015: Bahadurpur
Party	Candidate	Votes	%	±%
RJD	Bhola Yadav	71,547	45.95	
BJP	Hari Sahni	54,558	35.04	
CPI(M)	Shyam Bharti	5,595	3.59	
CPI	Rajiv Kumar Choudhary	3,529	2.27	
CPI(ML)L	Baidyanath Yadav	3,519	2.26	
Independent	Arun Kumar Mishra	2,950	1.89	
Independent	Ashok Kumar Mandal	1,953	1.25	
NOTA	None of the above	4,910	3.15	
Majority		16,989	10.91	
Turnout		155,714	57.92	
