= Simri =

Village in India

Simri is a village in the district of Darbhanga, Bihar, India. According to the 2001 census it had a population of 10,436.
