= Tatuar =

Village in Bihar, India

Tatuar is a village under Manigachi block in Darbhanga District of Bihar. It is surrounded by villages like Ujan to the east, Brahampura to the west, Sakhwar to the north and Baghant to the south. Situated in the Mithila region, residents of the village speak Maithili. Among other languages, Hindi is widely understood whereas a working knowledge of English is restricted to the educated population of the village.

Tatuar Village is divided into different clustered settlements which together constitute the village. These settlements are called Tolas or Tol in Maithili. The main tolas are:

- Puwai Tol
- Pachhwai Tol
- Amtahi
- Chiya Tol
- Jagganathpur

Hinduism is the widely followed religion but a considerable Muslim population exists in the south western part of village.

Among the public amenities, Tatuar has a high school run by government where education up to 12th standard under the Indian Education System is provided. Another school called Srikrishna Sanskrit Vidyalaya provides Sanskrit medium education up to junior high school level. The village also has a post office with the postal code 847422.

Tatuar is connected by road and railway. The new four-laned East-West Corridor runs along the north side of the village. Another road connecting Manigachi with Tatuar runs through the center of village. The nearest railway station is called Mandan Mishra Halt, which is a meter gauge. It connects to the Sakri Junction (the nearest broad gauge station) to the village.

== Notable people ==
- Dr. Amarnath Jha (Retired principal)
