= Bhola Yadav =

Indian politician

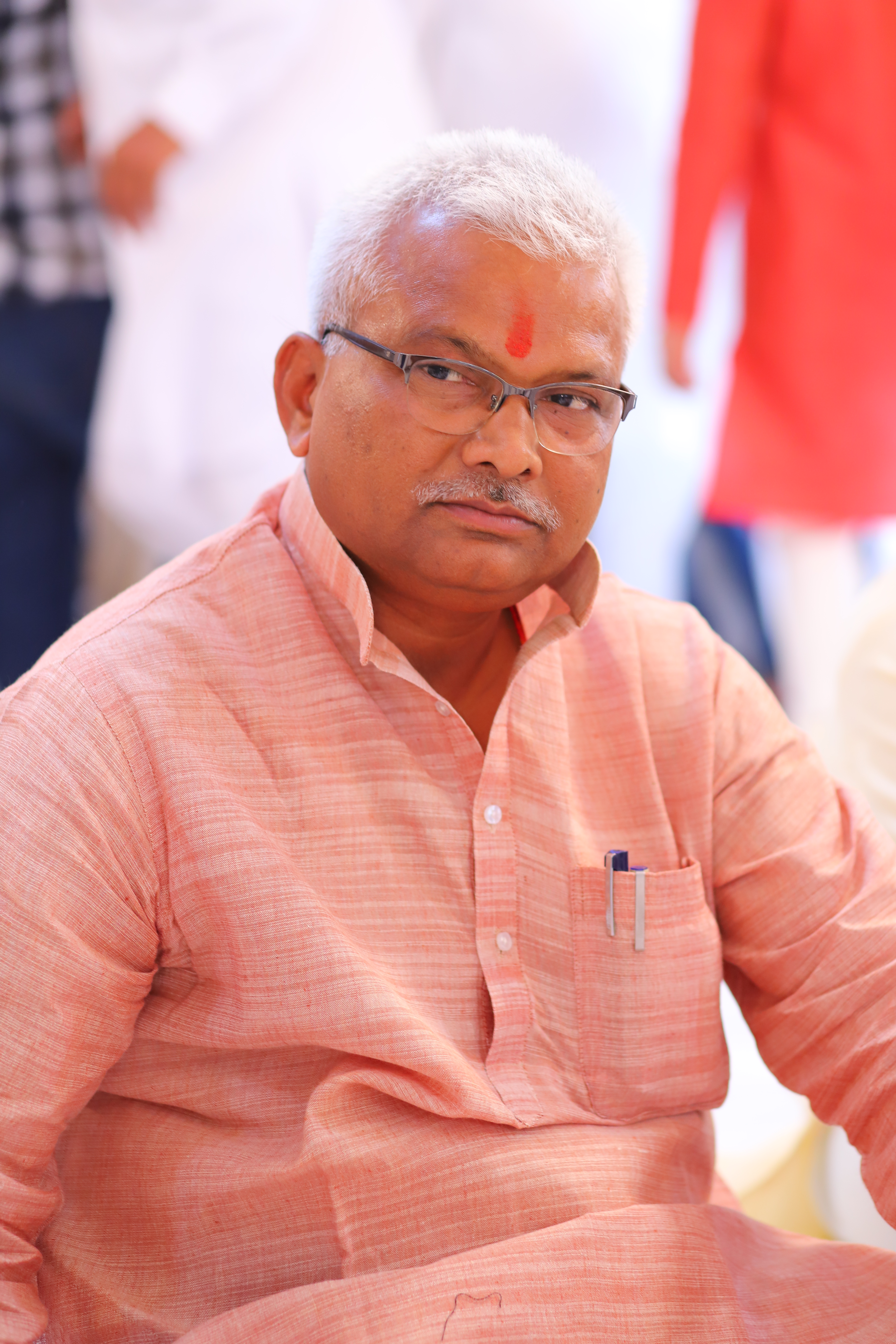

Private Secretary to Chief Minister, Bihar
- In office September 2000 – March 2005

Officer on Special Duty to Minister of Railway (India)
- In office March 2005 – May 2009

Private Secretary to Leader of Opposition (Bihar)
- In office June 2009 – March 2010

Member of Legislative Council (Bihar)
- In office 4 September 2014 – 21 November 2015
- Preceded by: Ghulam Gauss
- Constituency: darbhanga

Member of Legislative Assembly (Bihar) of the 16th Bihar Vidhan Sabha
- In office November 2015 – November 2020
- Preceded by: Madan Sahni
- Constituency: Bahadurpur, Darbhanga

Personal details
- Born: 18 September 1962 (age 64) Darbhanga, Bihar, India
- Party: Rashtriya Janata Dal
- Spouse: Asha Yadav
- Children: 02 daughters, 1 son
- Website: rjd.co.in/dev
- As of 18 September, 2019

Bhola Yadav (born 18 September 1962) is an Indian politician and a former member of 16th Vidhan Sabha of Bihar. He represented the Bahadurpur (Vidhan Sabha constituency) of Bihar and is a member of the Rashtriya Janata Dal (RJD) political party. He won the 2015 Bihar Legislative Assembly election from Bahadurpur (Vidhan Sabha constituency). He is also currently the National General Secretary of RJD. He is one of the closest aides of Indian politician Lalu Prasad Yadav. He is like a shadow to the ex-CM couple. He is one of the prominent politicians from the RJD family of Bihar political scenario.

== Biography ==
Bhola Yadav was born in Kapchhahi village of Darbhanga district in Bihar. His father's name is Ram Prakash Yadav and his mother's name is Lakhpati Devi . He is a post-graduate in mathematics from Magadh University and was a guest teacher in a college in Fatuha, near Patna. He married Asha Yadav. They are parents to two daughters and one son.

== Political tenure ==
- 2014–2015 - Member, Bihar Legislative Council
- 2015–2020 - Member, Bihar Legislative Assembly (Bahadurpur Constituency)
