= Northern Black Polished Ware =

Iron Age culture of the Indian subcontinent

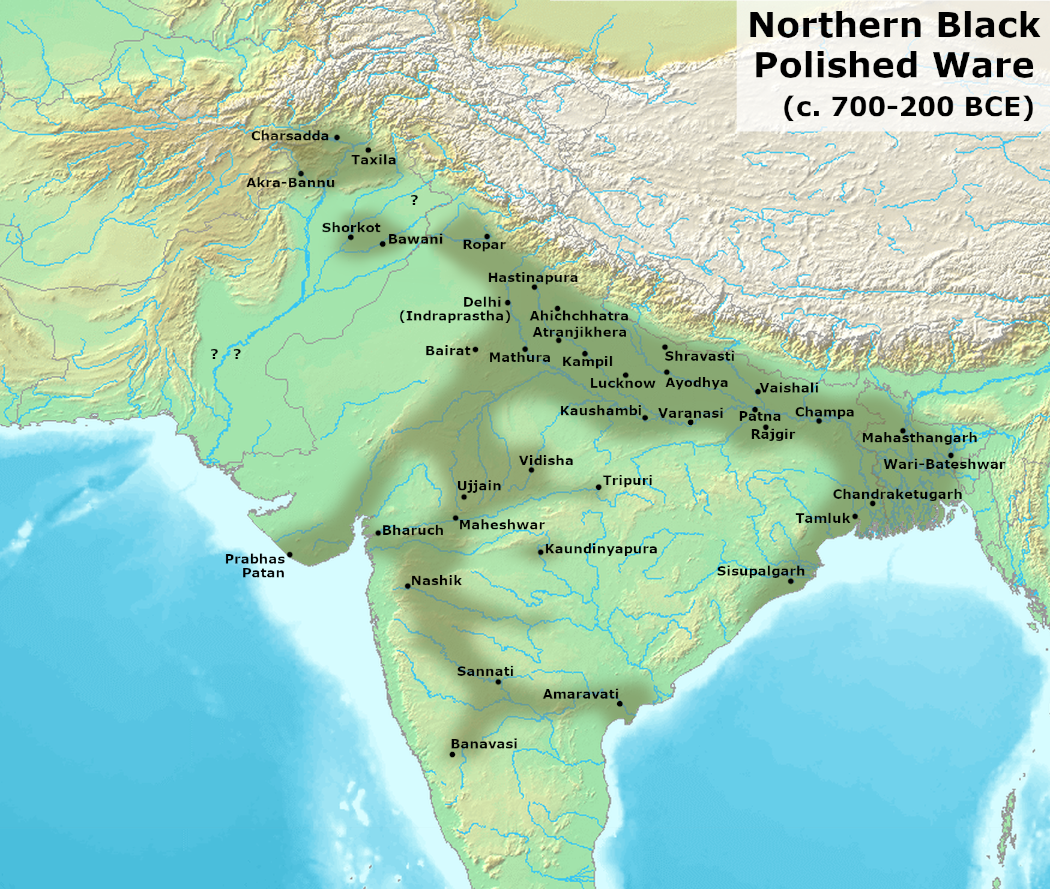
Map of some NBPW sites.

The Northern Black Polished Ware culture (abbreviated NBPW or NBP) is an urban Iron Age Indian culture of the Indian subcontinent, lasting c. 700–200 BCE (proto NBPW between 1200 and 700 BCE), succeeding the Painted Grey Ware culture and Black and red ware culture. It developed beginning around 700 BCE, in the so-called late Vedic period, and peaked from c. 500–300 BCE, coinciding with the emergence of 16 great states or Mahajanapadas in Northern India, and the subsequent rise of the Mauryan Empire.

Recent archaeological evidences have pushed back NBPW date to 1200 BCE at Nalanda district, in Bihar, where its earliest occurrences have been recorded and carbon dated from the site of Juafardih. Similarly sites at Akra and Ter Kala Dheri from Bannu have provided carbon dating of 900-790 BCE and 1000-400 BCE, and at Ayodhya around 13th century BC or 1000 BCE.

== Overview ==
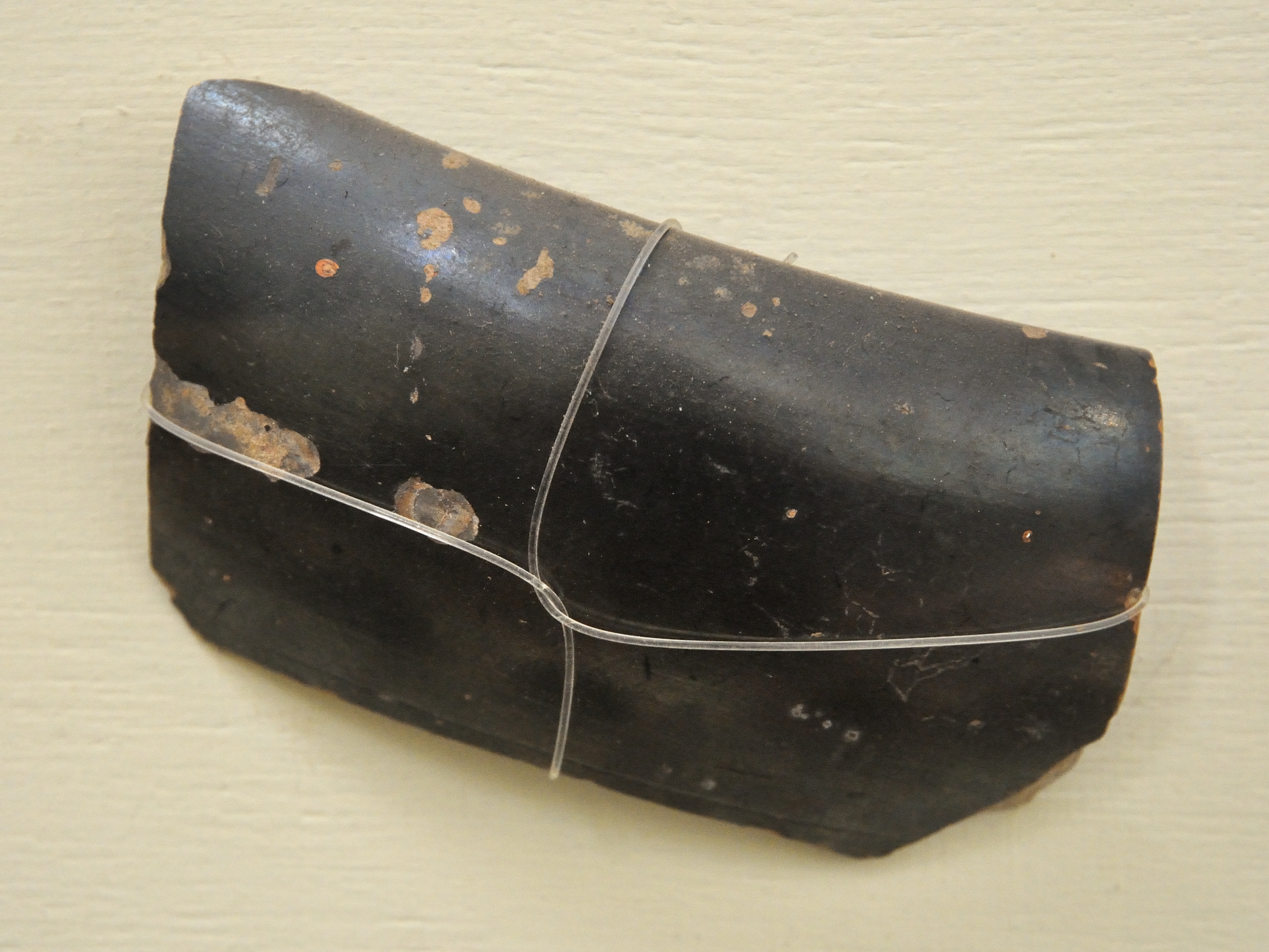
Fragment of Northern Black Polished Ware, 500-100 BCE, Sonkh, Uttar Pradesh. Government Museum, Mathura

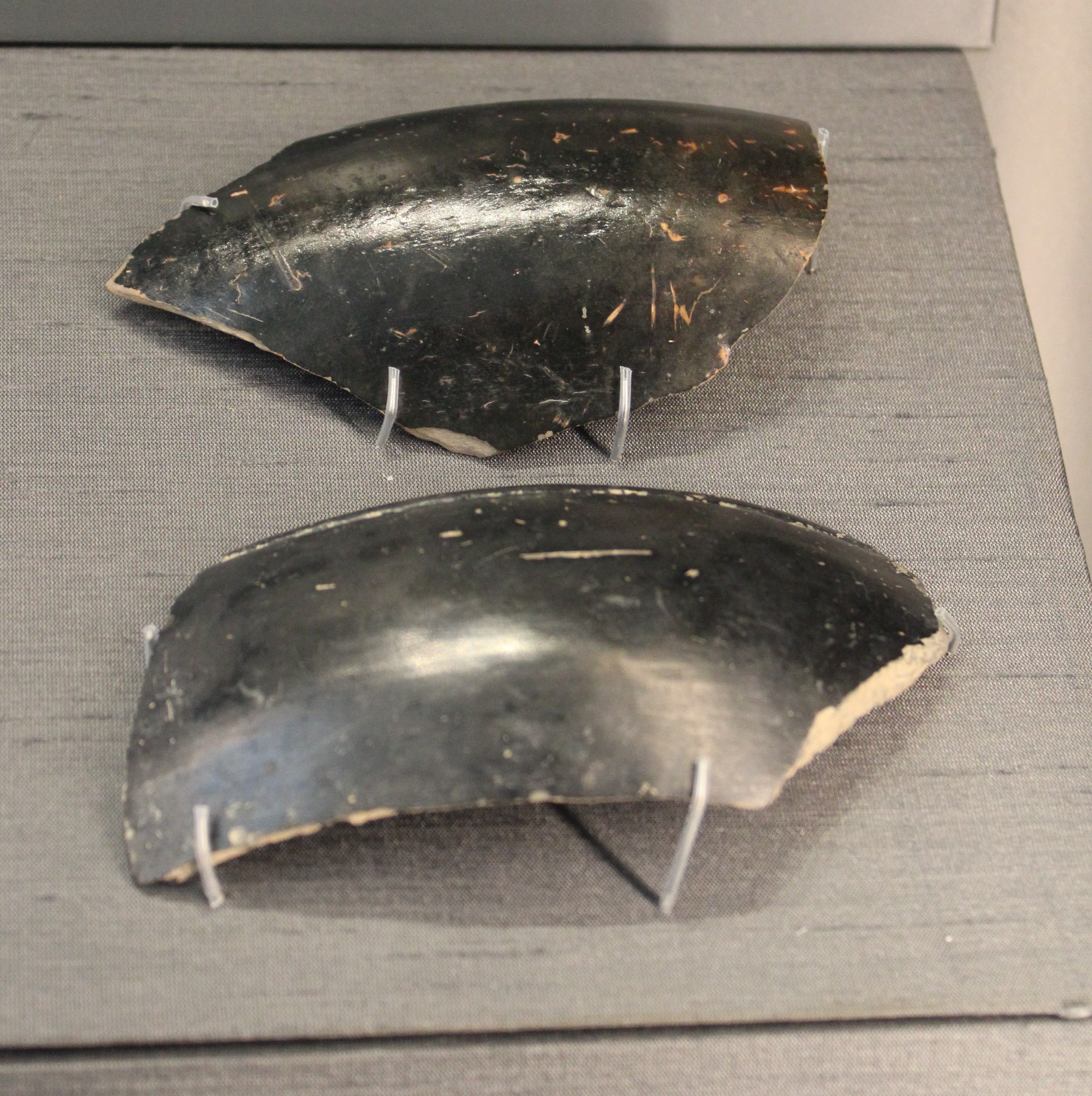
Fragments of Northern Black Polished Ware from Kausambi and Rajghat (Uttar Pradesh), about 500-400 BC. Display at the British Museum, items on loan from University College, London.

The diagnostic artifact and namesake of this culture is the Northern Black Polished Ware, a luxury style of burnished pottery used by elites. This period is associated with the emergence of Indian subcontinent's first large cities since the decline of the Indus Valley Civilisation; this re-urbanization was accompanied by massive embankments and fortifications, significant population growth, increased social stratification, wide-ranging trade networks, specialized craft industries (e.g., carving of ivory, conch shells, and semi-precious stones), a system of weights, punch-marked coins, and writing (in the form of Brahmi and Kharosthi scripts, including inscribed stamp seals).

Scholars have noted similarities between NBP and the much earlier Harappan cultures, among them the ivory dice and combs and a similar system of weights. Other similarities include the utilization of mud, baked bricks and stone in architecture, the construction of large units of public architecture, the systematic development of hydraulic features and a similar craft industry. There are also, however, important differences between these two cultures; for example, rice, millet and sorghum became more important in the NBP culture. The NBP culture may reflect the first state-level organization in the Indian Subcontinent.

According to Geoffrey Samuel, following Tim Hopkins, the Central Gangetic Plain, which was the center of the NBP, was culturally distinct from the Painted Grey Ware culture of the Vedic Aryans of Kuru-Pancala west of it, and saw an independent development toward urbanisation and the use of iron.

The end of the NBP culture around 200 BCE was marked by the replacement of the NBP ware with a different style of pottery, namely red ware decorated with stamped and incised designs. However, the same cities continued to be inhabited, and the period from c. 200 BCE – c. 300 CE was still "marked by urban prosperity all over the subcontinent," corresponding to the Shunga and Satavahana Dynasties, and the Kushan Empire.

NBPW have also been reported from various sites in Southern Thailand which were engaged in maritime trade activity with India in 1st millennium BCE. However, archaeologist Phaedra Bouvet regards these shards as KSK-Black Polished Wares, not linked technically to NBPW, except from their shape and style, produced between fourth and second centuries BCE, but indeed in contact with real NBPW producing populations.

== Proto-Northern Black Polished Ware ==
Proto-NBPW was first reported by Giovanni Verardi and his team in their excavations at Gotihawa in the Terai of Lumbini, Nepal, this recognised as a transitional phase from Black Slipped Ware to Northern Black Polished Ware. This ware can be identified from its lustrous black surface with red spots, the spots due to evident problems in the high temperature firing process. This ware is dated between 12th and 8th centuries BCE and features a black section, a thin slip, thick walls and the typical thali shape. Rakesh Tewari commented that Verardi noticed the presence of proto-NBPW at Gotihawa in 900-800 BCE and observed "that Proto-NBPW may exist at all the NBPW sites of the region dated to or earlier than the 9th-8th century BCE." Tewari suggests this pottery can be at least two centuries older than c. 800 BCE.

== Sites ==
Some notable NBPW sites, associated with the mahajanapadas, are as follows:

- Charsada (ancient Pushkalavati) and Taxila, in Pakistan
- Delhi or ancient Indraprastha
- Hastinapura, Mathura, Kampil/Kampilya, Ahichatra, Ayodhya, Sravasti, Jajmau, Prayagraj, Kausambi, Varanasi, all in Uttar Pradesh
- Vaishali, Rajgir, Pataliputra(Patna), Champa(Bhagalpur), Balirajgarh (Madhubani), Kopagarh (Darbhanga) and Sikligarh (Purnia) in Bihar
- Ujjain and Vidisha in Madhya Pradesh.
- Bangarh and Chandraketugarh in West Bengal

Other sites where Northern Black Polished Ware have been found are Mahasthangarh, Chandraketugarh, Wari-Bateshwar, Bangarh and Mangalkot (all in Bangladesh and West Bengal, India).

Sites in Sri Lanka such as Anuradhapura have also yielded Northern Black polished ware during the period 500 BC-250 BC indicating interaction with the Gangetic valley. Sites in Southern Thailand include Tam Sǔa in La Un district, Kapoe in Kapoe district and Phu Khao Tong in Suk Samran district in Ranong province and at Khao Sam Kaeo in Muang district and Tam Tuay in Thung Tako district in Chumphon province, although they cannot be considered as "classical" NBPW but local KSK-Black Polished Wares produced in Thailand. A number of ancient sites where the NBPW has been found, such as Ayodhya and Sringaverapura, are mentioned in the Hindu epic, the Ramayana.

== Sources ==
Samuel, Geoffrey (2010), The Origins of Yoga and Tantra: Indic Religions to the Thirteenth Century, Cambridge University Press
