= Swarna Singh =

Indian politician

Member of Bihar Legislative Assembly
- In office 2020–2025
- Preceded by: Madan Sahni
- Succeeded by: Sujit Singh
- Constituency: Gaura Bauram

Personal details
- Born: 1 October 1973 (age 52) Gaya, Bihar, India
- Party: Bharatiya Janata Party
- Spouse: Sujit Kumar
- Children: 2
- Education: AN College, Magadh University (BA)

Swarna Singh (born 1 October 1973) is an Indian politician from Bihar. She ran for office for the first time in the constituency Gaura Bauram, Darbhanga, State of Bihar and won with 59,538 votes.

== Early life ==
Swarna Singh was born in Gaya, Bihar. Her mother's name is Leelawati Devi and her father, Birkeshwar Prasad Singh, was a member of the BJP and Bihar Legislative Assembly.

She earned a Bachelor of Arts degree (Honors) in Political Science from A N College, Magadh University in 1996. She has also studied Fashion Design at South Delhi Polytechnic. Swarna Singh married Sujit Kumar, who works for the Central Government (Indian Revenue Service), and the couple have two sons.

The late Sunil Kumar Singh was the father-in-law of Swarna Singh and Mithlesh Devi is her mother-in-law. Sunil Kumar Singh was a member of the BJP Legislative Assembly who died due to COVID-19 on 21 July 2020. After the death of her father-in-law, Swarna Singh entered the political battle in the Gaura-Bauram constituency.
