= Bathai =

Village in Bihar, India

Bathai is a village in Darbhanga district, Bihar, India. It is on the bank of the Kamla Balan River. It is situated at 35 KM from district headquarter and 150 KM from Patna.

According to the 2011 census it has a population of 3664 living in 608 households. The literacy rate is 82%.

A middle and high school is in the east of village.Bathai is home to several Hindu religious sites, including the Prateek Vrindavan Radha Krishna Temple. The temple is situated near the Kamla Balan River and is associated with the religious and cultural life of the village.

The main castes in the village are Brahmin.

The language spoken in village is MaithiliHindi is also widely understood and spoken by the local population. The village celebrates major Hindu festivals such as Chhath, Holi, Diwali, Janmashtami and Durga Puja, along with various local religious and cultural traditions.”.

Almost 50% of the population of Bathai are in Delhi and Mumbai due to unemployment. The
