= Kopagarh =

Archaeological site in Bihar

- कोपगढ (Maithili)
- Location: Keoti block, Darbhanga district
- Region: Mithila region

Site notes
- Area: 70 acres (28 ha)

Kopagarh (Maithili: कोपगढ) is an archaeological site in the Mithila region of the Indian subcontinent. It is located in the Keoti block of the Darbhanga district in the state of Bihar in India. There is mound at the site. The size of the mound is smaller than that of Balirajgarh but the antiquity of the site excels. The site seems to be an important urban centre in the ancient period of the region. The neighbouring village of the Kopagarh is Miran Than.

== Description ==
Kopagarh is an ancient site in the state of Bihar in India. It lies off the Rahika - Darbhanga road. It was originally a moat. There is ruins of mud fortification wall. The mound at the site is spread over 70 acres of land. It was originally discovered by the archaeologist Dr S K Jha.

The site yields micaceous Black and Red Ware (BRW), Northern Black Polished Ware (NBP) and later potteries. Presently, the whole area of the site is under cultivation.
