= Kusheshwar Asthan Bird Sanctuary =

Protected area in Bihar, India

- IUCN category IV (habitat/species management area)
- Location within Bihar Location within India
- Interactive map of Kusheshwar Asthan Bird Sanctuary
- Nearest city: Darbhanga
- Coordinates: 25°49′53″N 86°18′15″E
- Area: 29.17 km^{2} (11.26 sq mi)
- Elevation: 49 m
- Established: 1994
- Governing body: Bihar Forest Department

Kusheshwar Asthan Bird Sanctuary is a protected area and bird sanctuary located in the Darbhanga district in the Indian state of Bihar. The sanctuary is named after the nearby Kusheshwar Asthan temple, a prominent Hindu pilgrimage site dedicated to Lord Shiva.

== Description ==
The sanctuary was officially established in 1994 under the Wildlife Protection Act, 1972, and encompasses approximately 29.17 km^{2} (11.26 sq mi) of predominantly waterlogged terrain across 14 villages in Kusheshwar Asthan block. It lies in the northern Gangetic plains at an average elevation of 49 m above sea level and is sustained by seasonal monsoon rains and overflow from the Kamla River.

== Flora and fauna ==
The sanctuary features shallow wetlands, marshes, and surrounding grasslands with aquatic vegetation such as water hyacinth and local grasses. It serves as the winter refugia for over 15 endangered migratory species—including the Dalmatian Pelican (Pelecanus crispus), Siberian Crane (Leucogeranus leucogeranus), Bar-headed Goose (Anser indicus), and Indian Darter (Anhinga melanogaster)—which arrive from Siberia, Mongolia, Tibet, and Central Asia between October and March. Resident avifauna include Indian Peafowl (Pavo cristatus), Grey Heron (Ardea cinerea), and the endemic Brahminy Duck (Tadorna ferruginea).

== Conservation and management ==
In August 2017, the Ministry of Environment, Forest and Climate Change issued the final notification declaring a 10 km Eco-Sensitive Zone (ESZ) around the sanctuary to regulate developmental activities and protect habitat integrity. Despite legal safeguards, a 2019 report highlighted rapid shrinkage of wetlands due to agricultural encroachment and water diversion, raising alarms over the sanctuary’s carrying capacity for migratory birds. Local media also reported ongoing cultivation on sanctuary lands and delays in infrastructure improvements, prompting fresh appeals for stricter enforcement of protection orders.

== See also ==
- Bhoramdev Wildlife Sanctuary
