= Bahera =

- town
- Location in Bihar, India Bahera (India)
- Coordinates: 26°5′0″N 86°9′0″E
- Country: India
- State: Bihar
- Region: Mithila
- District: Darbhanga

Government
  - Body: Bihar state gov.

Languages
  - Official: Maithili, Hindi, Urdu
- Time zone: UTC+5:30 (IST)
- Coastline: 0 kilometres (0 mi)
- Nearest city: Darbhanga
- Lok Sabha constituency: Darbhanga
- Civic agency: esbp

Bahera is a town in the district of Darbhanga in the state of Bihar, India.
