= Kirket =

2019 Hindi film

- Directed by: Yogendra Singh
- Written by: Vishal Vijay Kumar
- Produced by: R K Jalan; Sonu Jha; Vishal Tiwari
- Starring: Kirti Azad; Vishal Tiwari; Sonam Chhabra
- Cinematography: Devendra Tiwari
- Edited by: Tapos Ghosh
- Music by: Lahu-Madhav
- Release date: 18 October 2019 (India)
- Running time: 132 minutes
- Country: India
- Language: Hindi

Kirket is a 2019 Indian Hindi-language Indian film directed by Yogendra Singh, starring Kirti Azad, Vishal Tiwari, Sonam Chhabra, Sonu Jha, Jai Kumar. The film depicts the state of the Bihar Cricket Board.

== Plot ==
Kirket is a sports film that portrays the state of the Bihar Cricket Board. The story revolves around Kirti Azad, who was a cricketer and part of the 1983 Indian Cricket World Cup team. Now he tries to single-handedly change the future of the Bihar Cricket Board for the better, but is met with many obstacles. The movie is a mix of fact and fiction and also touches on various sensitive subjects such as caste-based and religious politics that are inherently part of the system.

== Cast ==
- Kirti Azad
- Vishal Tiwari
- Sonam Chhabra
- Sonu Jha
- Jai Kumar
- Saifullah Rehmani
- Gauri Shankar
- Dev Singh
- Maninder Singh
- Ajay Upadhyay
