= Anugrah Narayan College, Patna =

College in Bihar, India

Anugrah Narayan College
- अनुग्रह नारायण महाविद्यालय
- A N College Logo
- Other name: A N College
- Motto: विद्यातु परमो ज्योति (Sanskrit)
- Motto in English: Education is the greatest enlightenment
- Type: Coeducational College
- Established: 1956 (70 years ago)
- Accreditation: NAAC Grade A⁺
- Academic affiliations: UGC, Patliputra University
- Principal: Dr Ratna amrit
- Address: Boring road, Patna, Bihar, India
- Campus: Urban
- Website: www.ancpatna.ac.in

Anugrah Narayan College, Patna or A N College is a co-educational institution of the state of Bihar, India. It is located in Patna, the state capital city, on a 13 acres (53,000 m^{2}) site. A constituent unit of Patliputra University, the college was established in January, 1956 and its first principal was economist Dr. Gorak Nath Sinha. The college has 22 Undergraduate departments and 23 Postgraduate departments. The physics department of the college holds the Ferroelectric Research Laboratory known for research and development of ferroelectric materials and devices. The college has been selected for Chancellor Award 2021 in Best College and Best Principal of Bihar.

== History ==
The institution was founded in 1956 as Gardanibagh College. It was located then at Patna High School and operated as an evening school to further the education of employees. It was subsequently renamed as Anugrah Narayan College in honour of Bihar Vibhuti Dr. Anugrah Narayan Sinha, one of the founders of modern Bihar, In 1959 the college moved to a rented building in Anisabad. The college moved to its present site when the Patna Improvement Trust provided it with 19 acres (77,000 m^{2}) of land, following the intervention of Sinha.

Many prominent figures have been associated with the college, and its governing body has also featured notable people such as Chief Justice of Bihar Justice K.B.N. Singh, Satyendra Narayan Sinha, Rajiv Pratap Rudy, Kishori Sinha, Justice Birendra Pratap Singh, Sheo Narayan Singh and Sunil Mukherjee.The Union Minister Shri Rajiv Pratap Rudy is a lecturer in economics at the A.N. College. While maintaining its traditional educational courses, the college has introduced a number of technology- and industry-driven courses. Many new courses in fields such as electronics and environmental sciences were introduced during the 1980s on the initiative of the University Grants Commission and the Government of Bihar,

== Notable alumni ==
- Amit Kumar Das, Indian-Australian philanthropist and businessman
- Amitabh Singh, Deputy Project Director for Chandrayaan-2 mission, Indian Space Research Organisation (ISRO)
- Subodh Kant Sahay, former Union Tourism Minister.
- Sanjay Nirupam, former MP
- Ravindra Kishore Sinha, former Rajya Sabha MP
- Swarna Singh, MLA of Gaura Bouram (Darbhanga)
