= Gopal Jee Thakur =

Indian politician

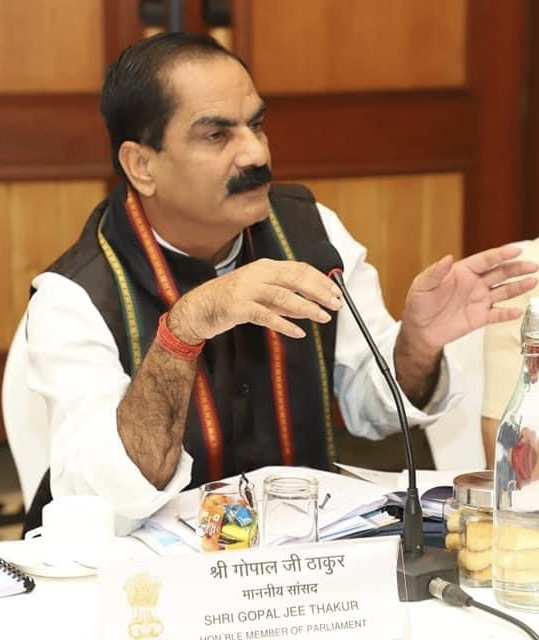

Member of Parliament, Lok Sabha
- Incumbent
- Assumed office 23 May 2019
- Preceded by: Kirti Azad
- Constituency: Darbhanga

Vice President of Bharatiya Janata Party
- In office 2017–2019
- President: Nityanand Rai

Member of Bihar Legislative Assembly
- In office 2010–2015
- Preceded by: Constituency created
- Constituency: Benipur

President of Bharatiya Janata Party, Darbhanga
- In office 2003–2007

Personal details
- Born: 15 October 1969 (age 56) Darbhanga, India
- Party: Bharatiya Janata Party
- Spouse: Chandu Thakur (M.1999)
- Children: Keshav Kunal Thakur (Son) & 1 daughter
- Parent(s): Late Ganesh Prasad Thakur (father); Ram Sagar Devi (mother)
- Education: Ph.D (Sociology)
- Alma mater: Lalit Narayan Mithila University
- Profession: Social Worker & Agriculturist

Gopal Jee Thakur (born 15 October 1969) is an Indian Politician from the Bharatiya Janata Party, and a Member of Parliament representing 14 - Darbhanga (Lok Sabha constituency) in India.

He is a Member of Standing Committee on Railways, Member of Consultative Committee, Ministry of Railways, and the special invitee Member of BJP's National Executive committee.

Thakur had represented the Bihar legislative assembly from Benipur (Vidhan Sabha constituency) as a member of the Bharatiya Janata Party in 2010 and served as Vice President of the Bharatiya Janata Party, State Unit of Bihar, India.

Thakur was elected to 17th Lok Sabha from Darbhanga Lok Sabha seat in the 2019 Indian general election by a margin of 2,67,979 votes. He defeated RJD candidate Abdul Bari Siddiqui.

He again won the Loksabha seat from the Darbhanga in the 2024 Indian General Election. He defeated Lalit Kumar Yadav of RJD from 1,78,156 votes.

== Early life and education ==
Gopal Jee Thakur was born on 15 October 1969 in the village of Parri, Biraul in a Maithil Brahmin family of Darbhanga district, Bihar. He was the second of five children born to Ganesh Prasad Thakur (1932-2020) and Ram Sagar Devi. His father late Ganesh Prasad Thakur (Kishaan Bhai) was a farmer, a Science teacher and was associated with Jansangh.

Thakur married Chandu Thakur on 5 July 1999. She is from Nehra village, Manigachhi, Darbhanga District. They have a son and a daughter.

Thakur did his graduation, post graduation and Ph.D in Sociology from Lalit Narayan Mithila University. He is an agriculturist and a social worker by profession.

== Political career ==
Gopal Jee Thakur is a veteran Politician from Mithila region of Bihar, India and has been associated with BJP from almost four decades. He was very active in student politics of Darbhanga from 1984 to 1990. In 1990, he became the Panchayat President of his village Parri. In 1992, he became the President of youth wing of BJP Biraul. In 1994, he became the General Secretary of Kishan Morcha of BJP Darbhanga District. From 1996 to 2003, he served as the President of BJP Biraul for two terms. He became the District President of Darbhanga BJP in 2003. From 2007 to 2013, he served as the member of BJP Bihar State executive committee for two terms. In 2010, he became an MLA From Darbhanga’s Benipur Constituency. In 2017, he became the Vice President of BJP Bihar.

Thakur won the 2019 Indian General Election by securing a total of 5,86,668 votes and elected as the MP of Darbhanga Lok Sabha. In 2021, he became the Special Invitee member of Bharatiya Janata Party’s National Executive Committee.

Gopal Jee Thakur retained the Darbhanga Lok Sabha seat, defeating Rashtriya Janata Dal candidate Lalit Kumar Yadav by a margin of over 178,156 votes.

== Positions held ==
#	From	To	Position
01	1990	1992	Panchayat President, Parri (Bharatiya Janata Party)
02	1992	1994	BJP President, Yuva Morcha, Biraul
03	1994	1996	BJP General Secretary, Kishan Morcha, Darbhanga
04	1996	2003	BJP President, Biraul (two terms)
05	1998	2001	President, Primary Agricultural Credit Cooperation Society, Parri
06	1998	2001	Representative, Darbhanga CENTRAL cooperative Bank, Darbhanga
07	1998	2001	Member, IFFCO Fertiliser, Darbhanga
08	1998	1999	Member, Samastipur Railway Advisory Committee
09	2000	2003	Member, Darbhanga Telecom Advisory Committee
10	2003	2007	District President, Darbhanga BJP
11	2006	2006	Member, Chief Minister Road Bridge, Darbhanga, Bihar
12	2007	2007	Member, Jila 20 Sutri, Darbhanga District
13	2007	2013	Member, Bihar BJP State Executive Committee (Two Terms)
14	2010	2015	Member of Legislative Assembly, Bihar for Benipur (Vidhan Sabha constituency)
15	2013	2016	Co-ordinator, Cooperation Cell, BJP
16	2017	2019	Vice President (BJP Bihar State Unit)
17	2019	2024	Member of Parliament for Darbhanga (Loksabha Constituency)
18	2019	2024	Member, Standing Committee on Railways (Two Terms)
19	2019	2024	Member, Consultative Committee, Ministry of Railways (Two Terms)
20	2021	Present	Special Invitee Member, BJP’s National Executive Committee
21	2024	Present	Member of Parliament for Darbhanga (Loksabha Constituency).
22	2024	Present	Whip of BJP(Ruling Party) in Lok Sabha

== Electoral performance ==
=== 2024 ===
2024 Indian general election: Darbhanga
Party	Candidate	Votes	%	±%
BJP	Gopal Jee Thakur	5,66,630	55.33	
RJD	Lalit Kumar Yadav	3,88,474	37.93	
Majority		1,78,156	17.40	
Turnout		10,24,184	57.37	
BJP hold		Swing		

=== 2019 ===
2019 Indian general election : Darbhanga
Party	Candidate	Votes	%	±%
BJP	Gopal Jee Thakur	5,86,668	60.79	+22.81
RJD	Abdul Bari Siddiqui	3,18,689	33.02	
IND	Saguni Ray	13,774	1.43	
BSP	Md. Mukhtar	11,255	1.17	
None of the Above	None of the Above	20,468	2.12	
Majority		2,67,979	27.77	
Turnout		9,65,510	58.35	+2.90
BJP hold		Swing		

=== 2015 ===
Bihar Assembly election, 2015: Benipur
Party	Candidate	Votes	%	±%
JD(U)	Sunil Chaudhary	69,511	46.88	
BJP	Gopal Jee Thakur	43,068	29.04	
Independent	Kamalramvinod Jha "Kamal Seth"	10,154	6.85	
Independent	Vinod Kumar Jha	6,061	4.09	
Independent	Siyalakhan Yadav	2,459	1.66	
Independent	Sunil Kumar Jha "Moti Babu"	2,340	1.58	
CPI	Ram Naresh Roy	2,299	1.55	
BSP	Laxman Ram	1,685	1.14	
Independent	Vinoda Nand Jha	1,385	0.93	
Sarvajan Kalyan Loktantrik Party	Krishna Kant Jha	1,350	0.91	
NOTA	None of the above	4,614	3.11	
Majority		26,443	17.84	
Turnout		148,283	55.62	

=== 2010 ===
Bihar Assembly election, 2010: Benipur
Party	Candidate	Votes	%	±%
BJP	Gopal Jee Thakur	43,222	40.33	
RJD	Hare Krishna Yadav	29,265	27.31	
Majority		13,957	13.02	
Turnout		107,175	47.27	
BJP hold		Swing		

== See also ==
- 2010 Bihar Legislative Assembly election
- List of Winners Bihar Assembly Election 2010
- List of politicians from Bihar
- List of members of the 17th Lok Sabha
