= Kirti Azad =

Indian cricketer and politician

Member of Parliament, Lok Sabha
- Incumbent
- Assumed office 4 June 2024
- Preceded by: S. S. Ahluwalia
- Constituency: Bardhaman–Durgapur
- In office 16 May 2009 – 23 May 2019
- Preceded by: Mohammad Ali Ashraf Fatmi
- Succeeded by: Gopal Jee Thakur
- Constituency: Darbhanga
- In office 1999–2004
- Preceded by: Mohammad Ali Ashraf Fatmi
- Succeeded by: Mohammad Ali Ashraf Fatmi
- Constituency: Darbhanga

Member of the Delhi Legislative Assembly
- In office 1993–1998
- Succeeded by: Sheila Dixit
- Constituency: Gole Market

Personal details
- Born: Kirtivardhan Jha Azad; 2 January 1959 (age 67) Bhagalpur, Bihar, India
- Party: Trinamool Congress (2021–present)
- Other political affiliations: Indian National Congress (2019–2021); Bharatiya Janata Party (1990–2019)
- Spouse: Poonam Azad (d. 2024)
- Children: 2
- Parent: Bhagwat Jha Azad (father)
- Cricket career

Cricket information
- Batting: Right-handed
- Bowling: Right-arm offbreak
- Role: Bowler

International information
- National side: India
- Test debut (cap 150): 21 February 1981 v New Zealand
- Last Test: 12 November 1983 v West Indies
- ODI debut (cap 29): 6 December 1980 v Australia
- Last ODI: 18 April 1986 v Pakistan

Domestic team information
- Years: Team
- 1976–1994: Delhi

Career statistics
Competition	Test	ODI	FC	LA
Matches	7	25	142	72
Runs scored	135	269	6,634	1,521
Batting average	11.25	14.15	39.48	27.16
100s/50s	0/0	0/0	20/27	0/8
Top score	24	39*	215	94
Balls bowled	750	390	15,420	2,086
Wickets	3	7	234	50
Bowling average	124.33	39.00	30.72	27.48
5 wickets in innings	0	0	5	0
10 wickets in match	0	0	0	0
Best bowling	2/84	2/48	7/63	3/16
Catches/stumpings	3/–	7/–	95/–	22/–
Medal record
Men's Cricket
Representing India
ICC Cricket World Cup
Winner	1983 England and Wales
ACC Asia Cup
Winner	1984 United Arab Emirates
- Source: ESPNcricinfo, 19 August 2014

Kirtivardhan Jha Azad (born 2 January 1959) is an Indian politician and former cricketer. Azad was a member of the Indian team that won the 1983 Cricket World Cup.

Azad is the son of former Chief Minister of Bihar Bhagwat Jha Azad. He was a right-hand batsman and an offspinner.

Azad won the 2014 Lok Sabha election for Darbhanga, Bihar. In February 2019, Kirti Azad joined Indian National Congress. He joined Trinamool Congress (TMC) after meeting TMC chief Mamata Banerjee in Delhi on 23 November 2021.

== Domestic career ==
Azad attended Modern School in Delhi where he was part of the school cricket team. Azad, was an allrounder for Delhi for many years, and in 95 Ranji Trophy matches he scored 4867 runs at an average of 47.72 and took 162 wickets at an average of 28.91. His highest score was 215 against Himachal Pradesh in 1985–86.

== International career ==
Azad was a surprise choice for the tour of Australia and New Zealand in 1980–81, making his Test debut at Wellington. He then played three Tests without much success against England in 1981-82 and was later picked for the 1983 World Cup.

In his international career, Azad played 7 test matches (1981–83) and 25 one-day-internationals (1980–86). Though full of potential, he couldn't take his domestic performance to the international level, scoring only 135 test runs and 269 in one-days. He picked 3 and 7 wickets in the two forms, respectively.

== Politics ==
Azad followed his father Bhagwat Jha Azad, former Chief Minister of Bihar, into politics and was elected to Parliament on a Bharatiya Janata Party (BJP) ticket from Darbhanga, Bihar. He served his second term in the Lok Sabha representing Darbhanga. He was previously an MLA from Delhi's Gole Market constituency. He won the 2014 Lok Sabha Elections from Darbhanga. On 23 December 2015 he was suspended from BJP for openly targeting Union finance minister Arun Jaitley over alleged irregularities and corruption in Delhi's cricket body Delhi and District Cricket Association. Azad joined the Indian National Congress on 18 February 2019. He fought general election from Dhanbad Lok Sabha constituency for 2019 representing Indian National Congress, against BJP candidate Pashupati Nath Singh and lost it with a margin of 4.8 lakhs. In November 2021, Azad joined the Trinamool Congress ahead of the 2022 Goa Legislative Assembly election and said that he will work under Mamata Banerjee till retirement from politics. Since 5 March 2022, he has also been the State In-charge of the Trinamool Congress in Goa, succeeding Mahua Moitra. Azad won the 2024 Lok Sabha Election from the Bardhaman-Durgapur constituency in West Bengal.

== Personal life ==
Azad was married to Poonam, who was a politician and a member of Aam Aadmi Party, and later Indian National Congress. Poonam died on 2 September 2024. They had two sons, Suryavardan and Somyavardhan. His elder son Suryavardhan has played for the Delhi Under-17s, Under-19s and Under-22s, while his younger son Somyavardhan has played the for Delhi Under-15s and Under-17s.

Former IPS officer and ex-Information Commissioner Yashovardhan Azad is his elder brother.

== Views on IPL ==
Following a 2012 sting operation on players of the Indian Premier League (IPL), Azad came out in opposition of the tournament and demanded that it be banned. Speaking about the Indian T20 team, he reportedly alleged that the players played for self rather than the country. He further said that he felt agitated and ashamed to be associated with the BCCI in the wake of the IPL controversy.

== Controversy ==
In December 2025, during the winter session of the Lok Sabha, BJP MP Anurag Thakur alleged—without naming anyone—that a Trinamool Congress MP had used an e-cigarette inside the Parliament House. The allegation triggered sharp political controversy, which intensified after a video surfaced showing TMC MP Kirti Azad holding and inhaling an object. Notably, smoking is strictly prohibited inside Parliament, and e-cigarettes have been completely banned in India since 2019, with penalties including fines and imprisonment.

=== 2026 MPs Rebellion ===
Following the 2026 Assembly Elections, 20 out of the 28 Members of Parliament from Trinamool Congress decided to leave Mamata Banerjee and the Trinamool Congress. They formed a new group and decided to merge with a relatively little known National Party, the Nationalist Citizen Party of India and presented a representation in this regards to Lok Sabha Speaker Om Birla on 14 June 2026.

After this major split in the Trinamool Congress, only 8 Lok Sabha MPs remained loyal to Mamata Banerjee. The loyalist MPs included Abhishek Banerjee, Mahua Moitra, Sougata Roy, Kalyan Banerjee, Kirti Azad, Pratima Mondal and Sajda Ahmed.

The event is still unfolding.

== In popular culture ==
Azad played himself in the lead role of the 2019 Indian film Kirket. The 2021 Indian film 83, which is based on India's World Cup win, featured Dinker Sharma portraying Azad's character.
