= Bhapura =

Coordinates: 29.250°N 77.019°E

- Village
- Interactive map of Bhapura
- Country: India
- State: Haryana
- District: Panipat

Population
  - Total: 2,000

Languages
  - Official: Hindi
- Time zone: UTC+5:30 (IST)
- Telephone code: 01802
- ISO 3166 code: IN-HR
- Vehicle registration: HR
- Nearest city: panipat
- Literacy: 95%
- Website: haryana.gov.in

Bhapura or Bapura is a village in Panipat district of Haryana, India. It is situated 1 kilometre (0.62 mi) off Grand Trunk road, near Samalkha. It is one of the 30 villages under the municipal committee of Samalkha.
