= Shashi Bhushan Hazari =

Indian politician

Member of Bihar Legislative Assembly
- In office 24 November 2010 – 1 July 2021
- Preceded by: New Seat established
- Succeeded by: Aman Bhushan Hajari
- Constituency: Kusheshwar Asthan

Personal details
- Died: 1 July 2021 (aged 55) Sir Ganga Ram Hospital, New Delhi
- Party: Janata Dal (United)
- Education: 12th Pass
- Profession: Politician

Shashi Bhushan Hazari was an Indian politician from Janata Dal (United). He was elected as a member of the Bihar Legislative Assembly from Kusheshwar Asthan (constituency). On 1 July 2021, Hazari died at Sir Ganga Ram Hospital in New Delhi after suffering from Hepatitis B for a long time.
