= Aman Bhushan Hajari =

Indian politician

MLA, Bihar Legislative Assembly
- In office 2 November 2021 – 2025
- Preceded by: Shashi Bhushan Hazari
- Succeeded by: Atirek Kumar
- Constituency: Kusheshwar Asthan

Personal details
- Party: Janata Dal (United)
- Parent: Shashi Bhushan Hazari (father)

Aman Bhushan Hajari is an Indian politician who served as a Member of Legislative Assembly (MLA) from 2021 to 2025, representing Kusheshwar Asthan constituency in the Bihar Legislative Assembly in India. He is a member of Janata Dal (United). He was elected as the MLA on 2 November 2021.
