= Darbhanga Lok Sabha constituency =

Lok Sabha constituency in Bihar, India

Coordinates: 26.2°N 85.9°E

Darbhanga
- Lok Sabha constituency

Constituency details
- Country: India
- Region: East India
- State: Bihar
- Assembly constituencies: Gaura Bauram; Benipur; Alinagar; Darbhanga Rural; Darbhanga; Bahadurpur
- Established: 1952
- Total electors: 14,95,445 (2019)
- Reservation: None

Member of Parliament
- 18th Lok Sabha
- Incumbent Gopal Jee Thakur
- Party: BJP
- Alliance: None
- Elected year: 2024
- Preceded by: Kirti Azad

Darbhanga Lok Sabha constituency is one of the 40 Lok Sabha (parliamentary) constituencies in Bihar state in eastern India. Currently Gopal Jee Thakur (BJP) is the Member of Parliament from Darbhanga Loksabha. In 2024 Indian general election, Gopal Jee Thakur won from this constituency.

== Assembly segments ==
From 2009 Lok Sabha elections, Darbhanga Lok Sabha constituency comprises the following six Vidhan Sabha (legislative assembly) segments:

#	Name	District	Member	Party	2024 lead
79	Gaura Bauram	Darbhanga	Sujit Singh	BJP	BJP
80	Benipur	Darbhanga	Binay Choudhary	JD(U)	BJP
81	Alinagar	Darbhanga	Maithili Thakur	BJP	BJP
82	Darbhanga Rural	Darbhanga	Rajesh Mandal	JD(U)	BJP
83	Darbhanga	Darbhanga	Sanjay Saraogi	BJP	BJP
85	Bahadurpur	Darbhanga	Madan Sahni	JD(U)	BJP

== Members of Parliament ==
Year	Name	Party
1952	Abdul Jalil	Praja Socialist Party
1952	Narayan Das	Indian National Congress
1957	Narayan Das	Indian National Congress
1962	Narayan Das	Indian National Congress
1967	Satya Narayan Sinha	Indian National Congress
1971	Binodanand Jha	Indian National Congress
1972^	Lalit Narayan Mishra	Indian National Congress
1977	Surendra Jha 'Suman'	Janata Party
1980	Hari Nath Mishra	Indian National Congress
1984	Vijay Kumar Mishra	Lokdal
1989	Shakeelur Rehman	Janata Dal
1991	Ali Ashraf Fatmi	Janata Dal
1996	Ali Ashraf Fatmi	Janata Dal
1998	Ali Ashraf Fatmi	Rashtriya Janata Dal
1999	Kirti Azad	Bharatiya Janata Party
2004	Ali Ashraf Fatmi	Rashtriya Janata Dal
2009	Kirti Azad	Bharatiya Janata Party
2014	Kirti Azad	Bharatiya Janata Party
2019	Gopal Jee Thakur	Bharatiya Janata Party
2024	Gopal Jee Thakur	Bharatiya Janata Party

== Election Results ==
=== 2024 ===
2024 Indian general election: Darbhanga
Party	Candidate	Votes	%	±%
BJP	Gopal Jee Thakur	566,630	55.33	
RJD	Lalit Kumar Yadav	388,474	37.93	
Majority		178,156	17.40	
Turnout		1,024,986	57.49	
BJP hold		Swing		

=== 2019 ===
2019 Indian general election: Darbhanga
Party	Candidate	Votes	%	±%
BJP	Gopal Jee Thakur	586,668	60.79	+22.81
RJD	Abdul Bari Siddiqui	318,689	33.02	
IND	Saguni Ray	13,774	1.43	
BSP	Md. Mukhtar	11,255	1.17	
None of the Above	None of the Above	20,468	2.12	
Majority		2,67,979	27.77	
Turnout		9,65,510	58.35	+2.90
BJP hold		Swing		

=== 2014 ===
2014 Indian general elections: Darbhanga
Party	Candidate	Votes	%	±%
BJP	Kirti Azad	3,14,949	37.98	
RJD	Mohammad Ali Ashraf Fatmi	2,79,906	33.75	
JD(U)	Sanjay Kumar Jha	1,04,494	12.61	
SS	Kedar Ku Keshav	25,277	3.05	
NOTA	None of the Above	21,103	2.54	
Majority		35,043	4.23	
Turnout		8,29,289	55.45	+13.80
BJP hold		Swing		

=== 2009 ===
2009 Indian general elections: Darbhanga
Party	Candidate	Votes	%	±%
BJP	Kirti Azad	2,39,268	43.85	
RJD	Mohammad Ali Ashraf Fatmi	1,92,815	35.33	
INC	Ajay Kumar Jalan	40,724	7.46	
IND	Prof. Hare Ram Acharya	12,977	2.38	
CPI(ML)L	Sathy Narayn Mukhiya	12,154	2.23	
IND	Lalbahadur Yadav	10,622	1.95	
Majority		46,453	8.52	
Turnout		5,45,713	41.75	
BJP gain from RJD		Swing		

=== 2004 ===
2004 Indian general elections: Darbhanga
Party	Candidate	Votes	%	±%
RJD	Mohammad Ali Ashraf Fatmi	4,27,672	56.07	
BJP	Kirti Azad	2,84,209	37.27	
Majority		1,43,463	18.81	
Turnout		7,62,657		
RJD gain from BJP		Swing		
