= Binay Kumar Choudhary =

Indian Politician

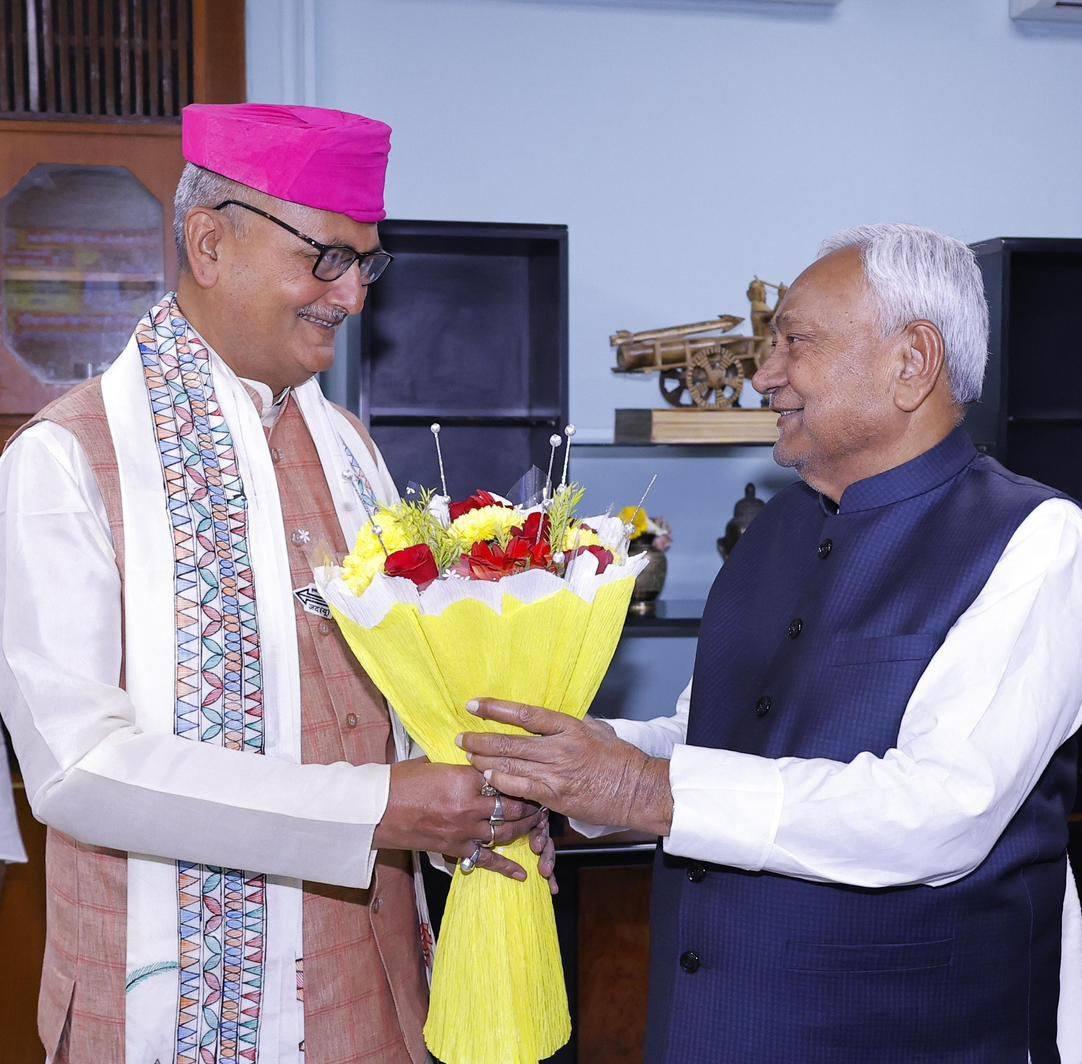
- Chaudhary with CM. Nitish Kumar

Member of Bihar Legislative Assembly
- Incumbent
- Assumed office 2020
- Preceded by: Sunil Chaudhary
- Constituency: Benipur

Personal details
- Party: Janata Dal (United)
- Profession: Politician

Binay Kumar Chaudhary is an Indian politician. He is a member of the Janata Dal (United) from Bihar. He was elected as a member of the 2020 Bihar Legislative Assembly election from Benipur (Vidhan Sabha constituency). He was re-elected as a Member of the Bihar Legislative Assembly from Benipur constituency in the 2025 Bihar Legislative Assembly election representing the Janata Dal (United). His niece, Pushpam Priya Choudhary, is the president of The Plurals Party.
