= Benipur =

- Census town & Village
- Census town location on Varanasi district map Benipur (Uttar Pradesh) Benipur (India)
- Coordinates: 25.368927°N 83.009789°E
- Country: India
- State: Uttar Pradesh
- District: Varanasi district
- Tehsil: Varanasi tehsil
- Elevation: 77.273 m (253.52 ft)

Population (2011)
  - Total: 12,470

Languages
  - Official: Hindi & English
- Time zone: UTC+5:30 (IST)
- Postal code: 221007
- Vehicle registration: UP 65 XX XXXX
- Census town code: 209729
- Lok Sabha constituency: Varanasi (Lok Sabha constituency)
- Vidhan Sabha constituency: Varanasi North

Benipur is a census town in Varanasi tehsil of Varanasi district in the Indian state of Uttar Pradesh. The census town falls under the Benipur gram panchayat. Benipur Census town is about 7 kilometers North-East of Varanasi railway station, 303 kilometers South-East of Lucknow and 14 kilometers North of Banaras Hindu University.

== Demography ==
Benipur has 1,708 families with a total population of 12,470. Sex ratio of the census town is 908 and child sex ratio is 848. Uttar Pradesh state average for both ratios is 912 and 902 respectively ^{[note]}.

Details	Male	Female	Total	Comments
Number of houses	-	-	1,708	(census 2011)
Adult	6,534	5,936	10,592	(census 2011)
Children	-	-	1,878	(census 2011)
Total population	6,534	5,936	12,470	(census 2011)
Literacy	73.3%	55.9%	65%	(census 2011)

== Transportation ==
Benipur is connected by air (Lal Bahadur Shastri Airport), by train (Varanasi City railway station) and by road. Nearest operational airports is Lal Bahadur Shastri Airport and nearest operational railway station is Varanasi City railway station (24 and 5 kilometers respectively from Benipur).

== See also ==
- Varanasi district
- Varanasi (Lok Sabha constituency)
- Varanasi North
- Varanasi tehsil

== Notes ==
- All demographic data is based on 2011 Census of India.
