= Rashtriya Jan Jan Party =

- Abbreviation: RJJP
- Leader: Ashutosh Kumar
- President: Deepnarayan Dubey
- Chairman: Lipi Kumari
- Lok Sabha Leader: Bhumihar samaj
- Founder: Ashutosh Kumar
- Founded: 2020
- Headquarters: Patna
- Newspaper: Forward Post
- Student wing: Chatra Rashtriya Jan Jan Party
- Youth wing: Yuva Rashtriya Jan Jan Party
- Women's wing: Mahila Morcha, Rashtriya Jan Jan Party
- Ideology: Centre
- Colours: Yellow & Green
- ECI status: Registered

Election symbol
- Bat

Website
- www.rjjp.org

Rashtriya Jan Jan Party is a registered political party by Election Commission of India. Ashutosh Kumar is the National president of this party. Bhumihar Brahman Ekta Manch is the mother organisation of RJJP. Rashtriya Jan Jan Party shall be contesting Bihar assembly elections 2020. In a press conference organised in Patna, Ashutosh said that Rashtriya Jan Jan Party has been formed to achieve golden dream of Bihar through industrial development.

== History ==
Its main ideology is for anti-reservation. It has been a vocal in demanding EWS reservation.

== Activities ==
The party has also been indulged in the relief work of migrants and flood victims. The party has also been conducting membership drives in last two month.

== Bihar Assembly Elections 2020 ==
Rashtriya Jan Jan Party contested almost all those assembly seats having forward caste dominant population.

== See also ==
- List of political parties in India
