= Atirek Kumar =

Indian politician

Member of the Bihar Legislative Assembly
- Incumbent
- Assumed office 14 November 2025
- Preceded by: Aman Bhushan Hajari
- Constituency: Kusheshwar Asthan

Personal details
- Party: Janata Dal (United)
- Education: University of Texas at Dallas
- Profession: Politician, Businessman

Atirek Kumar is an Indian politician from Bihar. He was elected as a Member of Legislative Assembly in 2025 Bihar Legislative Assembly election, representing the Kusheshwar Asthan constituency. He is a member of the Janata Dal (United).
