= Madan Sahni =

Indian politician

Madan Sahani
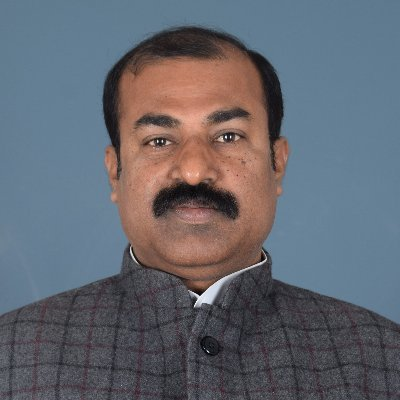

Minister of Prohibition, Excise and Registration Government of Bihar
- Incumbent
- Assumed office 07 May 2026
- Chief Minister: Samrat Choudhary
- Preceded by: Bijendra Prasad Yadav

Member of the Bihar Legislative Assembly
- Incumbent
- Assumed office 10 November 2020
- Preceded by: Bhola Yadav
- Constituency: Bahadurpur

Minister of Social Welfare Government of Bihar
- In office 15 March 2024 – 15 April 2026
- Chief Minister: Nitish Kumar
- Preceded by: Nitish Kumar
- Succeeded by: Bijendra Prasad Yadav
- In office 9 February 2021 – 28 January 2024
- Chief Minister: Nitish Kumar
- Preceded by: Ashok Choudhary
- Succeeded by: Shrawan Kumar

Personal details
- Party: Janata Dal (United)

Madan Sahni is an Indian Politician from Bihar. He belongs to Janata Dal (United). He has been elected thrice to the legislative assembly and he represents Bahadurpur (Vidhan Sabha constituency). He has also represented Gaura Bauram constituency (2015-2020). He previously served as the Minister of Social Welfare of Bihar.He is currently serving as the Minister of Prohibition, Excise and Registration of Bihar.

== Political life ==
Madan Sahni's political career started from Panchayat to Bihar legislative Assembly. He was elected to Zila Parishad and later won the District Board Chairman election. He was given JD(U) symbol to contest from Bahadurpur constituency. He successfully contested that election. In the next election (2015), he was shifted to Gaura Bauram constituency which he won too by a bigger margin, thus being inducted as Cabinet Minister. In the 2020 election, he made a comeback to his home constituency of Bahadurpur and won. He is currently serving as Social Welfare Minister of Bihar.

2020 Bihar Legislative Assembly Election

Bahadurpur (Vidhan Sabha constituency)
Result Status
O.S.N.	Candidate	Party	EVM Votes	Postal Votes	Total votes	% of votes
1	Devendra Kumar Jha	Lok Jan Shakti Party	16839	34	16873	9.48
2	Madan Sahni	Janata Dal (United)	68432	106	68538	38.5
3	Mohammad Salauddin	Bahujan Samaj Party	1567	10	1577	0.89
4	Ramesh Choudhary	Rashtriya Janata Dal	65617	292	65909	37.03
5	Arun Thakur	Log Jan Party - Secular,	1301	1	1302	0.73
6	Krishna Kumar Das	Rashtriya Jan Vikas Party	1106	0	1106	0.62
7	Priyanka Singh	The Plurals Party	810	1	811	0.46
8	Birendra Kumar Paswan	Vanchit Bahujan Aaghadi	1040	1	1041	0.58
9	Manish Kumar	Bhartiya Garibmazdoor Party,	511	1	512	0.29
10	Ram Prabhanjan Choudhary	Rashtriya Jan Jan Party	1696	3	1699	0.95
11	Rohit Kumar Paswan	Aazad Samaj Party (Kanshi Ram)	1529	2	1531	0.86
12	Vikram Singh	Bhartiya Sablog Party	2443	0	2443	1.37
13	Baldeo Ram	Independent	3570	0	3570	2.01
14	Mahendra Sahani	Independent	2288	0	2288	1.29
15	Binay Kumar Singh	Independent	4938	0	4938	2.77
16	NOTA	None of the Above	3866	7	3873	2.18
	Total		177553	458	178011	
