= Sarvajan Kalyan Loktantrik Party =

Political party in the state of Bihar, India

Sarvajan Kalyan Loktantrik Party (SKLP) is a political party in the state of Bihar in India. The party was floated by Akshay Verma on 11 March 2014.
