= List of politicians from Bihar =

Politicians From Bihar, India

This is a list of Politicians from Bihar, India. It includes leaders from different political parties.

Name	Image	Association	Constituency	Positions/Offices/Roles
Rajendra Prasad		Indian National Congress	Siwan	First President of India.
Shri Krishna Sinha		Indian National Congress	Sheikhpura	Member Constituent Assembly of India, Premier and First Chief Minister of Bihar Second Finance Minister of Bihar
Jagjivan Ram		Indian National Congress, Janata Party	Sasaram	Former Deputy Prime Minister of India Former Minister of Defence (India)
Shyam Nandan Prasad Mishra		Indian National Congress, Congress (O), Janata Party	Begusarai Lok Sabha constituency	Former Minister of External Affairs (India) Member of Parliament, Lok Sabha Member of Parliament, Rajya Sabha
Anugrah Narayan Sinha		Indian National Congress	Aurangabad	Constituent Assembly of India, Finance Minister Bihar, deputy chief ministers of Bihar
Jagdeo Prasad		Shoshit Samaj Da Samyukta Socialist Party		Former Deputy Chief Minister of Bihar
Lalit Narayan Mishra		Indian National Congress		Former Minister of Railways (India)
Rameshwar Sahu	Rameshwar Sahu	Indian National Congress & Samata Party	Rosera	Former Deputy Finance ministerof India
Jagannath Mishra		Indian National Congress		Former Chief Minister of Bihar (14th)
Karpoori Thakur		Socialist Party Janta Party	Tajpur Samastipur	Former Chief Minister of Bihar (11th)
Bali Ram Bhagat		Indian National Congress	Arrah Lok Sabha constituency	13th External Affairs Minister; 11th Governor of Rajasthan; 8th Governor of Himachal Pradesh; 6th Speaker of the Lok Sabha
Tariq Anwar		India National Congress	Katihar Lok Sabha Constituency	Minister of State of Agriculture and Food Processing Industries
Meira Kumar		Indian National Congress	Bijnor (Lok Sabha constituency)	Ex. Lok-Sabha Speaker
Nitish Kumar		Janata Dal (United)	Harnaut	Longest serving Chief Minister of Bihar
Lalu Prasad Yadav		Janata Dal; Rashtriya Janata Dal	Saran	Ex Chief Minister of Bihar (10 March 1990 – 3 March 1995) (4 April 1995 – 25 July 1997); Ex Minister of Railways (2004–2009)
Gopal Jee Thakur		Bhartiya Janta Party-BJP	Darbhanga	Member Of Parliament
Ram Vilas Paswan		Samyukta Socialist Party; Bharatiya Lok Dal; Janata Party; Janata Dal (United); Lok Janshakti Party		Former Union Railways Minister
Nand Kishore Yadav		Bhartiya Janta Party- BJP	Patna Sahib	Minister Road Construction Department - Government of Bihar
Sushil Kumar Modi		Bhartiya Janata Party	Bhagalpur (Lok Sabha constituency)	4th Deputy Chief Minister of Bihar Member of Parliament, Rajya Sabha
Onkarnath Baranwal	–	Jharkhand Vikas Morcha (Prajatantrik)	Chakai	
Ravi Shankar Prasad		Bharatiya Janata Party	Patna Sahib	Former Union Cabinet Minister
Bhola Singh	–	Bharatiya Janata Party	Nawada	
Radha Mohan Singh		Bharatiya Janata Party	Purvi Champaran	Former Union Cabinet Minister for Agriculture & Farmers Welfare
Raghuvansh Prasad Singh		Janata Party; Rashtriya Janata Dal	Vaishali	Ex Minister of Rural Development
Shatrughan Sinha		All India Trinamool Congress	Asansol Loksabha	Member of Parliament
Shivanand Tiwari	–	Janata Dal (United)		
Shakeel Ahmad		Indian National Congress		Spokesman for the All India Congress Committee
Ashok Kumar	–	Indian National Congress		CLP leader in the BLA 2009
Gauri Shankar Pandey		Indian National Congress	Bettiah	Ex Minister of Transport, Industry, Forest
Krishna Kumar Mishra		Bharatiya Janata Party	Chanpatia	Ex Minister, Revenue & Land Reforms (Bihar)
Upendra Kushwaha		Rashtriya Lok Morcha	Karakat	Ex member of Rajya Sabha Chairperson of Rashtriya Lok Samata Party ≥ Ex Minister of State In Rural development GOVt. of INDIA Minister of state in HRD Govt. of India (at present)
Radhanandan Jha		Indian National Congress		Ex Speaker Bihar Vidhan Sabha
Abdul Bari Siddiqui		Rashtriya Janata Dal (RJD)	Alinagar, Darbhanga	Former Finance Minister of Bihar
Giriraj Singh	Giriraj Singh	Bhartiya Janta Party	Begusarai	Union Cabinet Minister for Rural Development & Panchayati Raj
Brahmanand Mandal		Samata Party	Munger	Ex M.P.
Nityanand Rai		Bhartiya Janta Party	Ujiarpur	Union Minister of State for Home Affairs
Tejashwi Yadav		Rashtriya Janata Dal	Raghopur, Vaishali (Vidhan Sabha constituency)	Ex Deputy Chief Minister of Bihar
Awadh Bihari Choudhary		Rashtriya Janata Dal	Siwan Assembly constituency	Speaker of the Bihar Legislative Assembly
Deo Narayan Yadav		Rashtriya Janata Dal	Babubarhi Assembly constituency	12th Speaker of the Bihar Legislarive Assembly
Ram Lakhan Singh Yadav		Janata Dal	Arrah Lok Sabha constituency	Minister of Chemicals and Fertilizers
Syed Shahnawaz Hussain		Bharatiya Janata Party	Kishanganj	Former Minister of Industries, Govt of Bihar Former Minister of Textiles (India) Former Ministry of Civil Aviation (India)
Satyadeo Prasad Singh		Janata Dal United	Goriakothi	Former Member Bihar Legislative Assembly
