= Balirajgarh =

Archaeological site in Bihar, India

- Pachrukhi Garh
- Interactive map of Balirajgarh
- 26.4594651°N 86.3230140°E
- Type: Fortification
- Cultures: Iron Age India
- Region: Madhubani district, Bihar, India

History
- Built: c. 2nd century BCE and possibly earlier

Site notes
- Excavation dates: 1962-1963; 1972-73; 1974-75; 2013-2014; 2026 (ongoing)
- Discovered: 1884
- Condition: In ruins

Monument of National Importance
- Official name: Raja Bali ka Garh
- Type: Remains of Ancient Fort of Garh
- Reference no.: N-BR-33

Balirajgarh is an archaeological site within Madhubani district of Bihar, India. The site is 1 square km and houses an ancient fortification dating back to c. 200 BCE during the period of the Shunga Empire. It is possible the site is pre-Mauryan in origin and the Cambridge University archaeologist, Dilip Kumar Chakrabarti, believes Balirajgarh to be the site of Mithila, the capital of the Iron Age Videha tribe. The site of the Balirajgarh fort was first identified in 1884 by George Abraham Grierson, the then Madhubani sub divisional magistrate.

== Description ==
The ruins of the Balirajgarh fort is spread over 176 acres of land. It is located at the Balirajpur village of the Bhupatti panchayat in Babubarhi block of the Madhubani district in the Mithila region of Bihar. It is one of the 71 centrally protected sites of national importance in the state of Bihar in India under the Patna circle of ASI. Several scholars believe that the site of Balirajgarh fort is the remains and ruins of the Mithila’s early urban civilisation. It is officially listed as "Remains of Ancient Fort of Garh, locally known as Raja Bali Ka Garh, at Balirajgarh". It is also known as Pachrukhi Garh in the official record.

In the campus of the protected site, there are over 20 mounds. On these mounds cattle and pigs come to graze grasses. On one mound, every year an annual fair of Chaiety Mela (Chaitra Navratri) is organised by the villagers, where thousands of people come to visit the fair. There is a lone pond in the middle of the campus which has never ever gone dry.

According to the archeologist Dr Phanikant Mishra of the ASI, remains of a temple was also found here during the previous excavations of the site.

== Excavations ==
Following excavations of the site in 1962/63, the defensive walls were described as:

consisting of a mudbrick core with brick encasement, the outer one being four times the width of the inner. The wall was battered and measured 5.18m at the base and 3.65m at the top. Three phases of construction including repairs were recognized. The earlies phase consisted of mudbrick core with battered brick revetments, of which the outer had approximately three times the width of the inner. In the second phase, a brick-concrete ramp was built against the inner face. The third phase witnessed further reinforcement of the ramp in the shape of a 3m high platform of earth mixed with potsherds, built against the inner face of the fortifications.

In 1938, the Archeological Survey of India declared the ancient site of Balirajgarh as a site of national importance under the Ancient Monuments Preservation Act 1904. In the excavations done here in five phases, three thousand years old material was found. The first excavation of the site was conducted in 1962-1963 by the Archeological Survey of India. The second and third excavations was conducted by the Directorate of Archaeology and Museums, Government of Bihar, in 1972-73 and 1974-75. In 2013-2014, Archeological Survey of India, Bihar circle again started the excavation of the site but due to the negligence of the government no proper results were there. In 2015 Chief Minister Nitish Kumar of Bihar Government criticized ASI (Archeological Survey of India) for slow and neglected attitude towards the Balirajgarh fort excavation.

=== 2026 ===
On 26 February 2026, the headquarter of the Archaeological Survey of India (ASI) in New Delhi, granted fresh approval for excavation at the ancient site of the Balirajgarh fort. The major objective of the proposed excavation is "search for early Mithila civilisation". The proposed excavation is rekindling hopes for in-depth exploration of the buried layers of Mithila’s early urban civilisation under the site of Balirajgarh fort.

The proposed excavation formally inaugurated on 28 March 2026 in the presence of the Rajya Sabha MP Sanjay Kumar Jha along with the superintendent Hari Om Sharan of ASI Patna circle, at the premises of the archeological site. In the excavation, approximately 20 trenches will be dug to study the fabric of cultural continuity patterns across five distinct phases. These cultural phases are of the Mauryan (NBPW), Sunga, Kushan, Gupta, and Pala periods.

During the excavation of the trenches, some burnt-brick walls and structures were found inside a trench at the site. The archeologists involved in the ongoing scientific excavation, have excavated ancient brick walls, courtyards, floors, wells, drainage systems, coins, seals, clay sculptures and some other antiquities.

According to the current status note issued by the Department of Archaeology, a circular well with 13 rings (layers) was found during the ongoing excavation.

== Development proposal ==
The MLA Meena Kumari from the Babubarhi legislative constituency in Bihar, raised the issue of the development of Balirajgarh fort, in the Bihar Legislative Assembly on the last day of the budget session in 2026. She demanded with the Government of Bihar to develop the site of Balirajgarh as a tourist destination in the region with proper facilities. The Tourism minister Arun Shankar Prasad, replied that the protected status of the site prevents the state Government of Bihar for undertaking developmental work at the site.

The Rajya Sabha MP Sanjay Kumar Jha, has taken attentive initiative to establish the site of the Balirajgarh fort as a landmark site in the study of ancient Mithila similar to Nalanda and Vikramshila universities. According to him, the site of Balirajgarh in Mithila served as an important centre for the ancient civilization in the region. The golden historical and cultural legacy of the ancient civilization lies buried under the site. He is expecting that the site possesses the cultural and historical significance of the region.
