= Vinay Yadav =

Indian politician (born 1982)

Member of the Bihar Legislative Assembly
- In office 2020–2025
- Preceded by: Rajiv Nandan
- Succeeded by: Upendra Prasad
- Constituency: Gurua

Personal details
- Born: 8 February 1982 (age 44)
- Party: Rashtriya Janata Dal
- Parent: Umesh Kumar (Father)
- Education: B.A. Hons
- Occupation: Politician social work businessman

Vinay Yadav (born 8 February 1982) is an Indian politician who was elected as a member of Bihar Legislative Assembly from Gurua constituency in 2020 as the candidate of Rashtriya Janata Dal. He defeated Rajiv Nandan of BJP.

== See also ==
- Gurua Assembly constituency
