= Pawan Kumar Yadav =

Indian politician (born 1971)

Member of the Bihar Legislative Assembly
- In office 2020–2025
- Preceded by: Sadanand Singh
- Succeeded by: Shubhanand Mukesh
- Constituency: Kahalgaon

Personal details
- Born: 4 January 1971 (age 54) Pirpainti, Bihar, India
- Party: Bharatiya Janata Party

Pawan Kumar Yadav (born 4 January 1971) is an Indian politician who has served as a member of the Bihar Legislative Assembly since 2020. A member of the Bharatiya Janata Party, he represents the Kahalgaon constituency.

== Political career ==
Yadav ran for the Bihar Legislative Assembly in the 2015 election, contesting the Kahalgaon constituency as an independent candidate. He was defeated, placing third with 15% of the vote. He ran for the same constituency again in the 2020 election, standing as a Bharatiya Janata Party candidate. Despite the district being an Indian National Congress stronghold and his opponent being the son of prominent politician Sadanand Singh, Yadav was elected with 115,538 votes compared to his opponent's 72,379.

During his tenure, Yadav advocated for the expansion of Bhagalpur Airport, arguing that it could not handle large airplanes. In 2021, he met with state railway minister Ashwani Vaishnav regarding rail stoppages in the Bhagalpur district.
