= Kapil Deo Kamat =

Indian politician (1951–2020)

- कपिल देव कामत
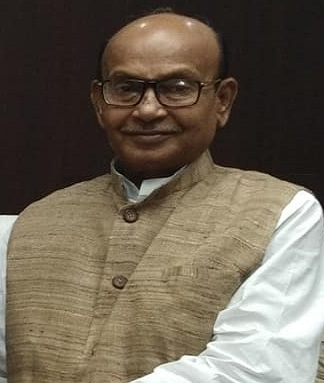

Minister of Panchayati Raj Government of Bihar
- In office 20 November 2015 – 16 October 2020

Member of Bihar Legislative Assembly
- In office 2015 – 2020
- Preceded by: Uma Kant Yadav
- Succeeded by: Mina Kumari
- Constituency: Babubarhi
- In office 2005 – 2010
- Preceded by: Deo Narayan Yadav
- Succeeded by: Uma Kant Yadav
- Constituency: Babubarhi

Personal details
- Born: 11 May 1951
- Died: 16 October 2020 (aged 69)
- Cause of death: COVID-19
- Party: Janata Dal (United)

Kapil Deo Kamat (11 May 1951 – 16 October 2020) was an Indian politician from Madhubani district of Bihar, India. He was serving as Minister of Panchayati Raj Department, Government of Bihar. He was a Member of Bihar Legislative Assembly representing Babubarhi.

== Early life ==
Kapil Deo Kamat was born on 11 May 1951, at Madhubani district in Bihar, India as a son of Late Anokhi Kamat.

== Political career ==
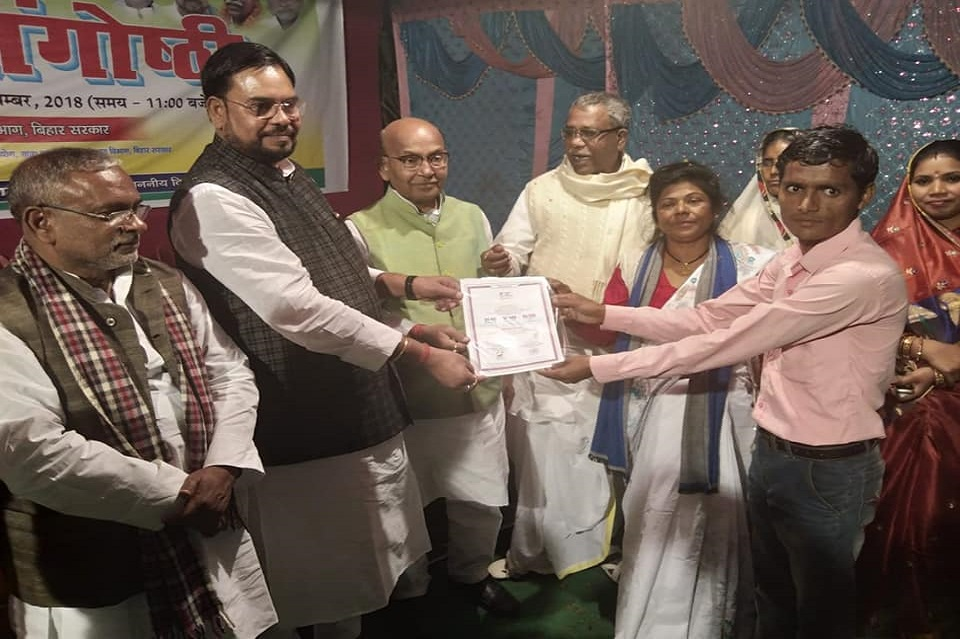
Kapil Deo Kamat (in green outfit) standing beside Ram Balak Singh, distributing benefits of various schemes of panchayati raj ministry to beneficiaries.

Kapil contested the October 2005 Bihar Legislative Assembly election as a Janta Dal United candidate from Babubarhi (Vidhan Sabha constituency) and won. Again, he contested the 2010 Bihar Legislative Assembly election from the same constituency but lost to Uma Kant Yadav of Rashtriya Janata Dal. In 2015 Bihar Legislative Assembly election he won from the Babubarhi (Vidhan Sabha constituency) and was appointed Minister of Panchayati Raj Department, Government of Bihar.

== Death ==
Kamat died from COVID-19 during the COVID-19 pandemic in India.
