= Bihar Legislature =

Bicameral legislature of the Indian state of Bihar

Bihar Legislature Bihar Vidhan Mandal
- Emblem of Bihar

Type
- Type: Bicameral
- Houses: Bihar Legislative Council (Upper house); Bihar Legislative Assembly (Lower house)

History
- Founded: 26 January 1950 (76 years ago)

Leadership
- Governor: Syed Ata Hasnain since 2 January 2025
- Chairman of the Legislative Council: Awadhesh Narain Singh, BJP since 20 June 2024
- Deputy Chairperson of the Legislative Council: Prof. Ram Bachan Rai, JD(U) since 24 July 2024
- Speaker of the Legislative Assembly: Dr. Prem Kumar, BJP since 2 December 2025
- Deputy Speaker of the Legislative Assembly: Narendra Narayan Yadav, JD(U) since 3 December 2025
- Leader of the House in the Legislature (Chief Minister): Samrat Choudhary, BJP since 30 March 2026
- Deputy Leader of the House in the Legislature (Deputy Chief Minister): Vijay Kumar Chaudhary; Bijendra Prasad Yadav, JD(U) since 15 April 2026
- Leader of the Opposition in the Legislative Council: Rabri Devi, RJD since 16 February 2024
- Leader of the Opposition in the Legislative Assembly: Tejashwi Yadav, RJD since 17 November 2025

Structure
- Seats: 318: 75 Members of Legislative Council; 243 Members of Bihar Legislative Assembly
- Bihar Legislative Council political groups: Government (50) NDA (50): BJP (27); JD(U) (20); LJP(RV) (1); HAM(S) (1); RLM (1); Official Opposition (19) MGB (19): RJD (17); INC (1); CPI(ML)L (1); Others (6): IND (4); JSP (1); RLJP (1)
- Bihar Legislative Assembly political groups: Government (201) NDA (201): BJP (88); JD(U) (85); LJP(RV) (19); HAM(S) (5); RLM (4); Official Opposition (35) I.N.D.I.A (35): RJD (25); INC (6); CPI(ML)L (2); IIP (1); CPI(M) (1); Others (7): AIMIM (5); BSP (1); JSP (1)

Elections
- Bihar Legislative Council voting system: Single transferable vote
- Bihar Legislative Assembly voting system: First-past-the-post
- Last Bihar Legislative Council election: 2026 Bihar Legislative Council elections
- Last Bihar Legislative Assembly election: 2025 Bihar Legislative Assembly election
- Next Bihar Legislative Assembly election: November 2030

Meeting place
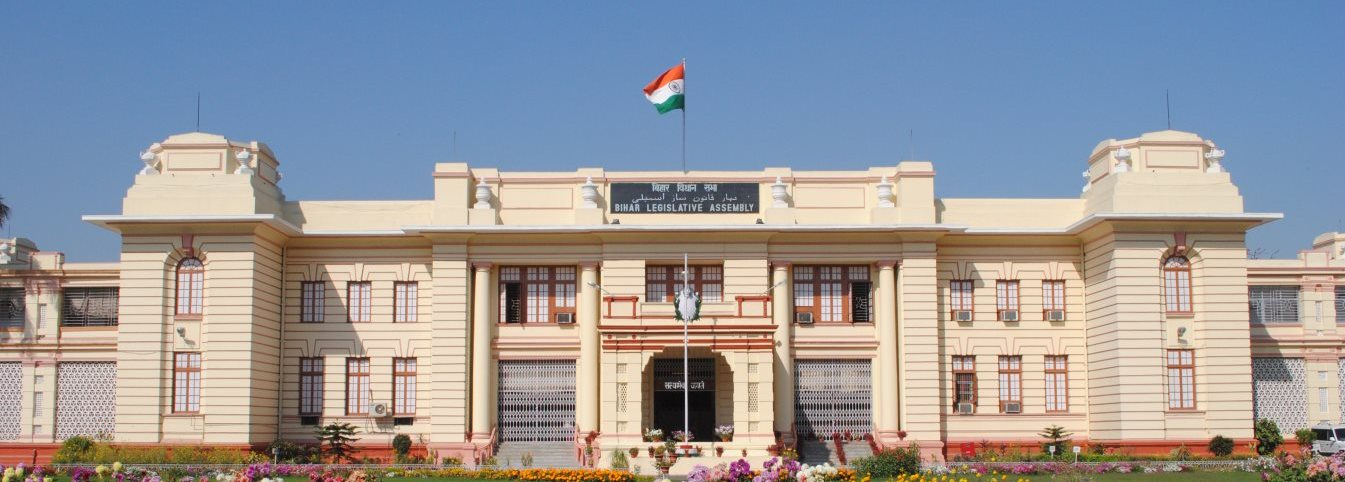
- Bihar State Assembly, Patna, Bihar, India

Website
- Bihar Legislative Council; Bihar Legislative Assembly

The Bihar Legislature (IAST: Bihar Vidhan Mandal) is the supreme legislative body of the Indian state of Bihar. It is a bicameral legislature composed of two houses: the Bihar Legislative Council (Bihar Vidhan Parishad) and the Bihar Legislative Assembly (Bihar Vidhan Sabha).

The Governor of Bihar, as the constitutional head of the legislature, has the authority to summon and prorogue either house of the legislature and to dissolve the Legislative Assembly. These powers are exercised on the advice of the Chief Minister and the Council of Ministers.

Those elected or nominated to either house of the legislature are collectively referred to as members of the legislature. Members of the Bihar Legislative Assembly are known as Members of the Legislative Assembly (MLAs), while members of the Bihar Legislative Council are known as Members of the Legislative Council (MLCs).

Members of the Bihar Legislative Assembly are directly elected by the people of Bihar from single-member constituencies through the first-past-the-post system. Members of the Bihar Legislative Council are elected indirectly by elected representatives, teachers, graduates and local authorities through the system of proportional representation.

The Bihar Legislature has a sanctioned strength of 243 members in the Legislative Assembly and 75 members in the Legislative Council, including 12 members nominated by the governor from the fields of literature, art, science and social service. The legislature meets at the Bihar State Assembly complex in Patna.
