= Rajiv Nandan =

Indian politician

Member of Bihar Legislative Assembly
- In office 2015–2020
- Preceded by: Surendra Prasad Sinha
- Succeeded by: Vinay Yadav
- Constituency: Gurua

Personal details
- Born: 23 March 1965 (age 60) Sangrampur, Munger district, Bihar
- Party: Bharatiya Janata Party
- Spouse: Rupam Sinha
- Children: 1 son, 2 daughters
- Parent: Sacchidanand Singh (father)
- Education: B.Sc (Chemical Engineering)

Rajiv Nandan also known as Rajiv Nandan Dangi is an Indian politician. He was elected to the Bihar Legislative Assembly from Gurua constituency in Bihar in the 2015 Bihar Legislative Assembly election as a member of the Bharatiya Janata Party.

Dangi was a resident of Gaya district of Bihar. His ancestral home was near Gulariya Chak in the Tikari Police Station area of Gaya. He was a member of Dangi sub-caste of the dominant Koeri caste of Bihar. He contested legislative assembly election twice. In 2015, he became the MLA from Gurua constituency, but in 2020, he was unable to retain his seat. He came from a political family and his father Sachidanand Dangi was also a politician. Sachidanand Dangi represented Belaganj Assembly constituency in Bihar Legislative Assembly. Rajiv Nandan was the personal assistant of parliamentarian Ramji Manjhi, which allowed him to begin his political career.

He died in 2023 at Paras Hospital in Patna. He was suffering from prolonged illness before his death.
