= Kahalgaon Assembly constituency =

Constituency of the Bihar legislative assembly in India

- Constituency No. 155 for the Bihar Legislative Assembly

Constituency details
- Country: India
- Region: East India
- State: Bihar
- District: Bhagalpur
- Established: 1951
- Total electors: 344,690

Member of Legislative Assembly
- 18th Bihar Legislative Assembly
- Incumbent Shubhanand Mukesh
- Party: JD(U)
- Alliance: NDA
- Elected year: 2025

Kahalgaon Assembly constituency is one of 243 legislative assemblies of Bihar. It is a part of the Bhagalpur lok sabha constituency along with other assembly constituencies: Gopalpur, Pirpainti, Bihpur, Bhagalpur and Nathnagar.

Most successful parties from Kahalgaon Assembly
1. INC + INC(I) (10 times) (58.9%)
2. JD (2 times) (11.8%)
3. JD(U) (2 time) (11.8%)
4. BJP (1 time) (6.00%)
5. CPI (1 time) (6.00%)
6. IND (1 time) (6.00%)

== Overview ==
Kahalgaon comprises CD Blocks Goradih & Sonhoula; Gram Panchayats Parashathdih (Shankarpur Khawas), Kodwar, Janidih, Pakkisarai, Dhanora, Maishamunda, Ekchari, Bholsar, Ogree, Shyampur & Nagar Panchayat Kahalgaon of Kahalgaon CD Block.

== Members of the Legislative Assembly ==
Year	Name	Party
1952	Ramjanam Mahto	Indian National Congress
1957	Bhola Nath Chaubey	Indian National Congress
1962	Syed Maqbool Ahmad	Indian National Congress
1967	Nageshwar Prasad Singh	Communist Party of India
1969	Sadanand Singh	Indian National Congress
1972	Sadanand Singh	Indian National Congress
1977	Sadanand Singh	Indian National Congress
1980	Sadanand Singh	Indian National Congress
1985	Sadanand Singh	Independent politician
1990	Mahesh Prasad Mandal	Janata Dal
1995	Mahesh Prasad Mandal	Janata Dal
2000	Sadanand Singh	Indian National Congress
2005	Sadanand Singh	Indian National Congress
2005	Ajay Kumar Mandal	Janata Dal (United)
2010	Sadanand Singh	Indian National Congress
2015	Sadanand Singh	Indian National Congress
2020	Pawan Kumar Yadav	Bharatiya Janata Party
2025	Shubhanand Mukesh	Janata Dal (United)

== Election results ==
=== 2025 ===
Bihar Legislative Assembly Election, 2025: Kahalgaon
Party	Candidate	Votes	%	±%
JD(U)	Shubhanand Mukesh	130,767	51.9	
RJD	Rajnish Bharti	80,655	32.01	
Independent	Pawan Kumar Yadav	10,244	4.07	
INC	Praveen Singh Kushwaha	10,083	4.0	▼31.36
Independent	Ramchandra Mandal	3,385	1.34	
JSP	Manjar Alam	3,348	1.33	
Independent	Rupam Devi	3,040	1.21	
NOTA	None of the above	3,249	1.29	▲0.22
Majority		50,112	19.89	▼0.98
Turnout		251,983	73.1	▲11.1
JD(U) gain from BJP		Swing		

=== 2020 ===
Bihar Assembly election, 2020: Kahalgaon
Party	Candidate	Votes	%	±%
BJP	Pawan Kumar Yadav	115,538	56.23	
INC	Shubhanand Mukesh	72,645	35.36	−1.32
Independent	Bijay Kumar Yadav	3,107	1.51	
NCP	Anuj Kumar Mandal	2,105	1.02	
Independent	Mahendra Tanti	1,973	0.96	
NOTA	None of the above	2,192	1.07	−1.95
Majority		42,893	20.87	+8.89
Turnout		205,463	62.0	+4.52
BJP gain from INC		Swing		

=== 2015 ===
2015 Bihar Legislative Assembly election: Kahalgaon
Party	Candidate	Votes	%	±%
INC	Sadanand Singh	64,981	36.68	
LJP	Niraj Kumar Mandal	43,752	24.7	
Independent	Pawan Kumar Yadav	26,510	14.97	
Independent	Najani Naj	9,093	5.13	
CPI	Sanjit Suman	7,339	4.14	
Independent	Deepak Kumar	3,409	1.92	
CPI(M)	Sanjiv Kumar	3,282	1.85	
Sarvajan Kalyan Loktantrik Party	Pradeep Kumar	3,266	1.84	
Independent	Suman Kumar Singh	2,757	1.56	
Independent	Binod Pandey	2,748	1.55	
National Tiger Party	Vindishwri Sharma	1,853	1.05	
BSP	Manoj Kumar Yadav	1,726	0.97	
NOTA	None of the above	5,353	3.02	
Majority		21,229	11.98	
Turnout		177,136	57.48	

=== 2010 ===
Bihar assembly elections, 2010: Kahalgaon
Party	Candidate	Votes	%	±%
INC	Sadanand Singh	44,936	33.97	
JD(U)	Kahkashan Perween	36,001	27.21	

== See also ==
- List of Assembly constituencies of Bihar
