= Neeraj Yadav =

Neeraj Yadav may refer to:

- Neeraj Yadav (politician) (died 2023), Indian politician
- Neeraj Yadav (parathlete) (1984–2026), Indian Paralympian and javelin thrower
