= Lakshmi Narayan Sudhanshu =

Indian writer, poet and politician

- लक्ष्मी नारायण सुधांशु

3rd Speaker of Bihar Legislative Assembly
- In office 15 March 1962 – 15 March 1967
- Preceded by: Dhanik Lal Mandal
- Succeeded by: Bindeshwari Prasad Verma

Member of the Bihar Legislative Assembly
- In office 1952–1957
- Constituency: Dhamdaha

Personal details
- Born: 15 December 1906
- Died: 7 April 1974 (aged 67)
- Party: Indian National Congress
- Occupation: Writer, Poet, Politician

Lakshmi Narayan Sudhanshu (1906–1974) was an Indian writer, litterateur, poet, independent activist and political leader. He won the 1952 Bihar Legislative Assembly election from an assembly seat in Purnia. He also held the post of Speaker of the Bihar Legislative Assembly from 1962 to 1967. Sudhanshu is known for actively participating in the Quit India Movement in 1942. He was imprisoned in Bhagalpur jail by the Britishers.

== Biography ==
=== Early life and education ===
Lakshmi Narayan Sudhanshu was born on 15 December 1906 to Thakur Dhanpat Singh Bundela of Chandwa Rupaspur and his wife Mata Godavri Devi in Dhamdaha sub-division of Purnia district. He belonged to Banaut subclan of Bundela Rajput Family which ruled Chandwa Rupaspur Estate. In 1934, he did MA in Hindi from Kashi University. In 1962, he earned a degree of D. Litt from Bhagalpur University.

=== Career ===
His first published novel was Matriprem. He was elected an MLA in 1952 after winning an assembly seat in Purnia. In 1962, he was elected unopposed as the Speaker of the Bihar Vidhan Sabha and held the position from 15 March 1962 to 15 March 1967. He also played an active role in the freedom struggle movement. In 1955, he established Kala Bhavan to promote literature, art and culture in Purnia.

From 1935 to 1938, he was the headmaster of Govardhan Sahitya Vidyalaya, Deoghar. At the same time, he was the editor of a quarterly magazine, Sahitya. He was also the editor of the weekly newspaper Rashtra-Sandesh of Purnia district and Patna's monthly magazine Avantika. He served as the President of the Hindi Pragati Samiti, established by the Bihar government. In 1939-40, he was the President of the Purnia District Board. In 1950, he was nominated as the President of the Bihar Pradesh Congress Committee. He is one of the founders of the Bihar Rashtrabhasha Parishad and was also a lifelong member of its board of directors. He started his literary career during his student life itself. He published a novel titled Bhatruprem in 1926, followed by Gulab Ki Kaliyan in 1928 and Rasrang in 1929.

=== Death ===
He died in Patna, Bihar, on 7 April 1974.

=== Commemoration ===
A biography book, Laxminarayan Sudhanshu Vyaktitva Aur Kratitiva (Laxminarayan Sudhanshu Personality and Works), was published in 2009 and written by Vanshidhar Singh. The Government of Bihar State has constituted an award after him, called Laxmi Narayan Sudhanshu Prize, which is given to scholars who published Research papers related to the Hindi language and literature.

== Books ==
- Matriprem
- Kavya Me Abhivyanjanavad
- Jeewan Ke Tattv Aur Kavya Ke Siddhant
- Hindi Sahitya Ka Brihat Itihas, Nagari Pracharini Sabha, Kashi
- Pracheen Bharatiya Arya Raj Vans
- Avantika (as magazine editor)
- Bhatruprem
- Gulab Ki Kaliyan
- Rasrang

== See also ==
- List of people from Bihar
- List of Indian writers
- List of speakers of the Bihar Legislative Assembly
