= Bindeshwari Prasad =

Bindeshwari Prasad may refer to,

- Bindheshwari Prasad Mandal, Indian politician from Bihar who was chairman of "Mandal Commission"
- Bindeshwari Prasad Sinha, Indian archeologist and historian from Bihar
- Bindeshwari Prasad Verma, Indian politician who was 1st Speaker of Bihar legislative assembly
