= Sikandra Assembly constituency =

Sikandra Assembly constituency may refer to:

- Sikandra, Bihar Assembly constituency
- Sikandra, Uttar Pradesh Assembly constituency
