= Indrajeet Prasad Gupta =

Indian politician

Member of the Bihar Legislative Assembly
- In office 14 November 2025 – Present
- Preceded by: Alok Ranjan Jha
- Constituency: Saharsa

National President of the Indian Inclusive Party
- Incumbent
- Assumed office 11 October 2025
- Preceded by: Position established

Personal details
- Born: January 1, 1970 (age 56) Patauna, Jamui district, Bihar, India
- Party: Indian Inclusive Party
- Other political affiliations: Indian National Congress
- Occupation: Politician

Indrajeet Prasad Gupta (born c. 1970) is an Indian politician and the National President of the Indian Inclusive Party. He currently serves as the Member of the Bihar Legislative Assembly from the Saharsa Assembly constituency.

He won the 2025 Bihar Legislative Assembly election with 115,036 votes, defeating BJP candidate Alok Ranjan Jha, who secured 112,998 votes, giving Gupta a victory margin of 2,038 votes.

== Early life and education ==
Gupta hails from Patauna in Jamui district, Bihar. He completed his M.Tech. in Civil Engineering from M.D.U. Rohtak, Haryana, in 2018. He is a successful businessmen and according the most recent property details he submitted to election commission of India, he has property worth more than Rs 35 Crores.

== Political career ==
=== Early elections ===
In the 2020 Bihar Legislative Assembly election, Gupta contested from the Sikandra as an Independent candidate. He received 7,576 votes and secured the 5th position. At that time he was member of Lok Janshakti Party One year after defeat in Bihar Assembly Election 2020, he joined Indian National Congress in 2021.

=== Akhil Bhartiye Pan Mahasangh ===
I P Gupta has been national president of All India Pan Mahasangh, a pan india caste organisation of Pan, Tanti, Tatwa caste.

=== Formation of the Indian Inclusive Party ===
Gupta quit the Indian National Congress on 7 April 2025 after meeting Rahul Gandhi in Delhi. After that he organised a massive rally of Pan Caste in Gandhi Maidan, Patna on 13 April 2025. This rally was against the decision of government to cancel SC status to Pan caste in Bihar. I P Gupta announced the formation of Indian Inqlab Party that later renamed as Indian Inclusive Party, (IIP), on 13 April 2025 in Gandhi Maidan itself. He became the national president.

Indian Inclusive Party joined I.N.D.I.A after meeting Rahul Gandhi and Tejaswi Yadav and got three seats in Bihar Assembly election 2025. These three seats were Saharsa, Jamalpur and Beldaur.

=== Saharsa MLA (2025–present) ===
Gupta contested the 2025 Bihar Legislative Assembly election from Saharsa on an IIP ticket and won by a narrow margin of 2,038 votes.
