= Arun Kumar Yadav =

Arun Kumar Yadav may refer to:

- Arun Kumar Yadav (Saharsa politician) (born 1950), Indian politician
- Arun Kumar Yadav (Uttar Pradesh politician) (born 1980), Indian politician
- Arun Kumar Yadav (Bhojpur politician) (born 1965), Indian politician
