= Fateh Bahadur Kushwaha =

Indian politician

Fateh Bahadur Singh
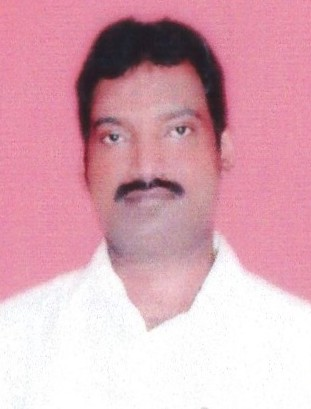

Member of the Bihar Legislative Assembly
- In office 2020–2025

Personal details
- Party: Rashtriya Janata Dal
- Spouse: Kusum Devi
- Occupation: Business & Politics

Fateh Bahadur Singh commonly known as Fateh Bahadur Kushwaha is a member of Bihar Legislative Assembly for the 17th Bihar Assembly. He was elected as a candidate of Rashtriya Janata Dal from the Dehri Assembly constituency of Rohtas district. In the 2020 Assembly elections, he defeated Satyanarayan Singh of Bhartiya Janata Party, who was his nearest political rival.

== Political career ==
Singh, who was a businessman in his earlier life, was aspiring to ticket from Upendra Kushwaha's Rashtriya Lok Samata Party to contest from Dehri Assembly constituency in 2015. However, in 2015 Bihar Assembly elections, he was denied the ticket by the party. In 2019, the by-polls were conducted in the Dehri constituency, to fill the vacancy arising out of the revocation of the membership of Muhammad Ilyas Hussain in Bihar Legislative Assembly. Hussain was convicted in a corruption case and the Bhartiya Janata Party's candidate Satyanarayan Singh defeated the other candidate, Mohammad Firoz Husain placed by Rashtriya Janata Dal.

In 2020 assembly elections, Fateh Bahadur Singh defeated Satyanarayan Singh Yadav with a margin of 464 votes. The nearest runner-up, Yadav got 63,721 votes.

In 2023, there was a raid by Income Tax Department on the Hotel owned by Singh. It was said to be a statewide exercise run by IT Department to clean up the administration.

== Controversies ==
He was also in controversy involving the chief councillor, Vishaka Singh; latter was accused of framing fake caste certificate of herself belonging to Extremely Backward Caste, for political gains. However, Singh had lodged a complaint against her with the District Magistrate of Rohtas in connection with the same.

== Personal beliefs ==
Singh has publicly spoken against the expenditure done on celebration of Dussera and has condemned brahminical views on existence of 33 crore deities in Hinduism. In October 2023, he made a public statement that goddess Durga is an imaginary figure and the epic tales of her fight with army of demons is also fabricated. He also called demon king Mahisasura as a hero of Yadav caste. Singh has also questioned that when India was enslaved by the Britishers, why didn't goddess Durga fight to liberate it. Because of his views, he was criticised later by Union Minister Giriraj Singh, who called his statement an attack on Sanatan Dharma.
