= Alok Ranjan Jha =

Indian politician

Former Minister of Art, Culture & Youth Affairs Government of Bihar
- In office 9 February 2021 – 9 August 2022
- Chief Minister: Nitish Kumar
- Preceded by: Mangal Pandey

Member of Bihar Legislative Assembly
- In office 2020–2025
- Preceded by: Arun Kumar Yadav
- Succeeded by: Indrajeet Prasad Gupta
- Constituency: Saharsa
- In office 2010–2015
- Preceded by: Sanjay Kumar Jha
- Succeeded by: Arun Kumar Yadav
- Constituency: Saharsa

Personal details
- Born: 15 October 1974 (age 51) Saharsa, Bihar, India
- Party: BJP
- Occupation: Politician

Alok Ranjan is an Indian politician from Bihar and Former Minister of the Art, Culture & Youth department Bihar Government. Alok Ranjan won the Saharsa Assembly constituency on the BJP ticket in the 2020 Bihar Legislative Assembly election.
