= Marukiya =

- Village
- Location in Bihar, India
- Coordinates: 26°30′35.6″N 86°13′47.4″E
- Country: India
- State: Bihar
- Elevation: 61 m (200 ft)

Languages
  - Official: Maithili, Hindi
- Time zone: UTC+5:30 (IST)
- PIN: 847228
- 06273: 06273
- ISO 3166 code: IN-BR
- Vehicle registration: BR32
- Lok Sabha constituency: jhanjharpur
- Vidhan Sabha constituency: Babubarhi
- Website: village.org.in/Marukiya

Marukiya is a village in Madhubani district, Bihar State, India. It is situated in the khajauli block, 31 km north of district headquarters Madhubani and 176 km from that state capital Patna and it is close to major towns like Jaynagar, which is further connected to India's main cities and to Nepal. It belongs to Darbhanga Division. The local language is Maithili.

== Education ==
Marukiya village has a higher literacy rate compared to Bihar state. In 2011, the literacy rate of Marukiya village was 62.15% compared to 61.80% of Bihar.

== Demographics ==
As per data released by the government of India for the 2011 census, Marukia village has a population of 4671 of which 2273 are females while 2398 are males. There are 865 households in the village. 18.56% of total population of village are children with age 0–6. The Average Sex Ratio of the village is 948 which is higher than the state of Bihar's average of 918. Marukia village is administrated by Sarpanch (Head of Village) who is elected representative of village as per the Constitution of India and Panchayati raj act.

== Languages and religion ==
The main languages spoken in this village are Maithili, Hindi.

== Geography ==
Marukiya is located in the northern part of Bihar.

== Transport ==
Marukiya is connected via road to nearby towns like Khajauli and Jainagar, Bihar

== See also ==
- Jainagar, Bihar
- Madhubani, India
- Darbhanga
