= Rajeev Ranjan Singh =

Indian politician from Bihar

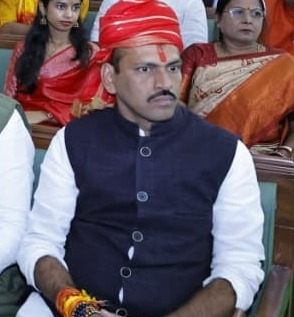

Member of Bihar Legislative Assembly
- Incumbent
- Assumed office 14 November 2025
- Preceded by: Fateh Bahadur Singh
- Constituency: Dehri Assembly constituency

Personal details
- Born: 7 May 1984 (age 42) Dehri-on-Sone, Rohtas, Bihar, India
- Party: Lok Janshakti Party (Ram Vilas)
- Spouse: Neetu Singh
- Children: 3
- Parent: Er Lalan Singh (father)
- Education: Intermediate, BSEB
- Profession: Businessman, Politician

Rajeev Ranjan Singh, popularly known as Sonu Singh, is an Indian politician and businessman from Bihar. He is the Member of the Bihar Legislative Assembly representing the Dehri Assembly constituency. Singh was elected for the first time in the 2025 Bihar Legislative Assembly election as a member of the Lok Janshakti Party (Ram Vilas).

== Political career ==
Singh contested the 2025 Bihar Legislative Assembly election from the Dehri constituency on a ticket of the Lok Janshakti Party (Ram Vilas). He won the seat, becoming MLA on 14 November 2025. His predecessor was Fateh Bahadur Singh of the RJD.

In the election, Singh defeated Guddu Kumar Chandrawanshi of the RJD by a significant margin.

== Electoral performance ==
The official result published by the Election Commission of India confirmed Singh’s victory in the Dehri Assembly constituency.

== See also ==
- Dehri Assembly constituency
- Bihar Legislative Assembly
- Lok Janshakti Party (Ram Vilas)
