= Balirajpur =

Village in Madhubani district

- Village
- Balirajpur
- Interactive map of Balirajpur
- Coordinates: 26°27′39″N 86°18′55″E
- Country: India
- State: Bihar
- Region: Mithila region
- District: Madhubani district
- Block: Babu Barhi
- Gram panchayat: Bhupatti
- Named for: King Bali
- Demonym: Maithil

Languages
  - Official: Mother language: Hindi; Maithili
- The village believed to be the Kingdom of Asura king Bali.

Balirajpur is a village believed to be the kingdom of mythological Asura king Bali. It is located in the Babubarhi block of the Madhubani district in the Mithila region of Bihar, India. It is the part of Bhupatti Panchayat in the Babubarhi block. According to the local residents of the village, Balirajpur was the capital city of the kingdom of Asura king Bali in ancient times. The Asura king Bali is mentioned in the text Vishnu Purana. In the village of Balirajpur, there is an ancient archeological site known as Raja Bali Ka Garh or Balirajgarh.

== Etymology ==
The word Balirajpur is the combination of three Indic words Bali, Raj and Pur. Bali was the grandson of the popular Vishnu devotee Prahlada and he was the king of Asura. The term Raj means kingdom. Similarly the term Pur is used to denote city or town. Thus the literal meaning of Balirajpur is the city of the kingdom of the King Bali.

== Temples ==
There are several temples in the village. One of the major temple is Ram Janaki Mandir near a pond in the village.
