= Onkar Nath (disambiguation) =

Onkar Nath or Onkarnath is an Indian name and may refer to

- Onkar Nath, Indian politician.
- Onkar Nath Srivastava, Indian material physicist.
- Onkarnath Baranwal, Indian politician
- Onkarnath Thakur, Indian singer.
- Jeevan (Hindi actor), born as Omkar Nath Dhar.
