= Dehri Assembly constituency =

Constituency of the Bihar legislative assembly in India

- Constituency No. - for the Bihar Legislative Assembly

Constituency details
- Country: India
- Region: East India
- State: Bihar
- District: Rohtas
- Established: 1951
- Total electors: 299,804

Member of Legislative Assembly
- 18th Bihar Legislative Assembly
- Incumbent Rajeev Ranjan Singh
- Party: LJP(RV)
- Alliance: NDA
- Elected year: 2025

Dehri Assembly constituency is an assembly constituency in Rohtas district in the Indian state of Bihar. It comes under Karakat lok sabha constituency. In 2020 Fateh Bahadur Singh of Rashtriya Janata Dal defeated Satyanarayan Singh of Bharatiya Janata Party to emerge victorious.

== Members of the Legislative Assembly ==
Year	Member	Party
1952	Basawon Singh	Socialist Party
1957	Basawon Singh	Praja Socialist Party
1962	Abdul Qaiyum Ansari	Indian National Congress
1967	Abdul Qaiyum Ansari	Indian National Congress
1969	Basawon Singh	Indian National Congress
1972	Abdul Qaiyum Ansari	Indian National Congress
1977	Basawon Singh	Janata Party
1980	Mohammad Iliyas Hussain	Janata Party (Secular)
1985	Khalid Anwar Ansari	Indian National Congress
1990	Mohammad Iliyas Hussain	Janata Dal
1995	Mohammad Iliyas Hussain	Janata Dal
2000	Mohammad Iliyas Hussain	Rashtriya Janata Dal
2005	Mohammad Iliyas Hussain	Rashtriya Janata Dal
2005	Pradeep Joshi	Independent
2010	Jyoti Rashmi	Independent
2015	Mohammad Iliyas Hussain	Rashtriya Janata Dal
2019^	Satyanarayan Yadav	Bharatiya Janata Party
2020	Fateh Bahadur Singh	Rashtriya Janata Dal
2025	Rajeev Ranjan Singh	Lok Janshakti Party (Ram Vilas)

== Election results ==
=== 2025 ===
Bihar Assembly election, 2025:Dehri
Party	Candidate	Votes	%	±%
LJP(RV)	Rajeev Ranjan Singh	104,022	54.29	
RJD	Guddu Kumar Chandrawansi	68,054	35.52	−6.05
ASP(KR)	Phate Bahadur Singh	7,003	3.66	
JSP	Pradeep Lallan Singh	4,323	2.26	
Independent	Saroj Kumar Singh	1,806	0.94	
Rashtra Sewa Dal	Pradip Kumar Joshi	1,762	0.92	−4.92
NOTA	None of the above	2,405	1.26	−0.12
Majority		35,968	18.77	+18.47
Turnout		191,592	63.91	+11.23
LJP(RV) gain from RJD		Swing		

=== 2020 ===
Bihar Assembly election, 2020: Dehri
Party	Candidate	Votes	%	±%
RJD	Fateh Bahadur Singh	64,567	41.57	+7.65
BJP	Satyanarayan Singh	64,103	41.27	
Rashtra Sewa Dal	Pradeep Kumar Joshi	9,070	5.84	−14.44
BSP	Sona Devi	6,027	3.88	+2.4
Independent	Rajiv Ranjan Kumar	3,706	2.39	
Independent	Shiv Gandhi	1,588	1.02	
NOTA	None of the above	2,145	1.38	−1.68
Majority		464	0.3	−2.38
Turnout		155,327	52.68	−0.68
RJD gain from BJP		Swing		

=== 2015 ===
2015 Bihar Legislative Assembly election: Dehri
Party	Candidate	Votes	%	±%
RJD	Mohammad Iliyas Hussain	49,402	33.92	
RLSP	Jitendra Kumar @ Rinku Soni	45,504	31.24	
Rashtra Sewa Dal	Pradeep Kumar Joshi	29,541	20.28	
CPI(ML)L	Ashok Kumar Singh	2,197	1.51	
BSP	Santosh Kumar Pandey	2,154	1.48	
Independent	Raju Kumar	2,146	1.47	
Independent	Dr.(Prof.) Raj Kumar	1,730	1.19	
CPI	Braj Mohan Singh	1,723	1.18	
SP	Upendra Singh Shakati	1,529	1.05	
NOTA	None of the above	4,458	3.06	
Majority		3,898	2.68	
Turnout		145,655	53.36	
