= Gurua Assembly constituency =

Assembly constituency in Bihar, India

Coordinates: 24.67°N 84.78°E

- Constituency No. 225 for the Bihar Legislative Assembly

Constituency details
- Country: India
- Region: East India
- State: Bihar
- District: Gaya
- Lok Sabha constituency: Aurangabad (Bihar)
- Established: 1977
- Total electors: 285,969

Member of Legislative Assembly
- 18th Bihar Legislative Assembly
- Incumbent Upendra Prasad
- Party: BJP
- Alliance: NDA
- Elected year: 2025
- Preceded by: Vinay Yadav

Gurua Assembly constituency is an assembly constituency for Bihar Legislative Assembly in Gaya district of Bihar, India. It comes under Aurangabad (Bihar Lok Sabha constituency). In this assembly constituency, though Yadav and Muslim are numerous, yet it is considered as a stronghold of the Koeris.

== Members of the Legislative Assembly ==
| Year | Member | Party |
|---|---|---|
| 1977 | Upendra Nath Verma | Janata Party |
| 1980 | Md. Shahjan | Indian National Congress |
| 1985 | Md. Khan Ali | Indian National Congress |
| 1990 | Ramchandra Singh | Independent politician |
| 1995 | Ramchandra Singh | Independent politician |
| 2000 | Shakeel Ahmad Khan | Rashtriya Janata Dal |
| 2005 | Shakeel Ahmad Khan | Rashtriya Janata Dal |
| 2005 | Shakeel Ahmad Khan | Rashtriya Janata Dal |
| 2010 | Surendra Prasad Sinha | Bharatiya Janata Party |
| 2015 | Rajiv Nandan Dangi | Bharatiya Janata Party |
| 2020 | Vinay Yadav | Rashtriya Janata Dal |
| 2025 | Upendra Prasad | Bharatiya Janata Party |

== Election results ==
=== 2025 ===
Bihar Assembly election, 2025: Gurua
| Party | Candidate | Votes | % | ±% |
|---|---|---|---|---|
| BJP | Upendra Prasad | 99,758 | 49.02 | ▲13.16 |
| RJD | Vinay Yadav | 75,564 | 37.13 | ▼2.42 |
| BSP | Raghvendra Narayan Yadav | 8,242 | 4.05 | ▼4.47 |
| JSP | Sanjeeva Singh | 4,400 | 2.16 | |
| ASP(KR) | Syed Imran Nabi | 3,514 | 1.73 | |
| Independent | Nagdev Paswan | 1,892 | 0.93 | |
| NOTA | None of the above | 3,946 | 1.94 | ▲1.4 |
| Majority | | 24,194 | 11.89 | ▲8.2 |
| Turnout | | 203,508 | 71.16 | ▲8.65 |
| BJP gain from RJD | | Swing | | |

=== 2020 ===
Bihar Assembly election, 2020: Gurua
| Party | Candidate | Votes | % | ±% |
|---|---|---|---|---|
| RJD | Vinay Yadav | 70,761 | 39.55 | |
| BJP | Rajiv Nandan Dangi | 64,162 | 35.86 | −3.48 |
| BSP | Raghvendra Narayan Yadav | 15,235 | 8.52 | +5.5 |
| JAP(L) | Sudhir Kumar Verma | 7,444 | 4.16 | +2.31 |
| RSPS | Yugesh Paswan | 2,336 | 1.31 | |
| Independent | Arvind Kumar Srivastwa | 1,905 | 1.06 | |
| Akhil Hind Forward Bloc (Krantikari) | Ramashray Ravidas | 1,795 | 1.0 | −0.19 |
| Independent | Binay Kumar | 1,666 | 0.93 | |
| NOTA | None of the above | 958 | 0.54 | −3.66 |
| Majority | | 6,599 | 3.69 | −0.85 |
| Turnout | | 178,918 | 62.51 | +7.36 |
| RJD gain from BJP | | Swing | | |

=== 2015 ===
2015 Bihar Legislative Assembly election: Gurua
| Party | Candidate | Votes | % | ±% |
|---|---|---|---|---|
| BJP | Rajiv Nandan | 56,480 | 39.34 | |
| JD(U) | Ramchandra Prasad Singh | 49,965 | 34.8 | |
| SS | Uday Kumar Verma | 8,007 | 5.58 | |
| BSP | Deonandan Yadav | 4,330 | 3.02 | |
| Aam Janta Party Rashtriya | Randhir Kumar Singh | 2,955 | 2.06 | |
| NCP | Anwar Ali Khan | 2,681 | 1.87 | |
| JAP(L) | Gopal Prasad | 2,658 | 1.85 | |
| Samras Samaj Party | Ram Prakash Singh Chuman | 2,650 | 1.85 | |
| Independent | Shalesh Kumar | 2,434 | 1.7 | |
| CPI(ML)L | Upendra Yadav | 1,872 | 1.3 | |
| Pragatisheel Magahi Samaj | Ajay Kumar | 1,783 | 1.24 | |
| Akhil Hind Forward Bloc (Krantikari) | Chandrashekhar Prasad | 1,710 | 1.19 | |
| NOTA | None of the above | 6,032 | 4.2 | |
| Majority | | 6,515 | 4.54 | |
| Turnout | | 143,557 | 55.15 | |
