= Bijay Singh =

Indian politician

Bihar Legislative Assembly
- Incumbent
- Assumed office 2020
- Preceded by: Neeraj Yadav
- Constituency: Barari

Personal details
- Party: Janata Dal (United)
- Occupation: Politician

Bijay Singh also known as Bijay Singh Nishad is an Indian politician from Bihar and a Member of the Bihar Legislative Assembly. Singh won the Barari on the Janata Dal (United) ticket in the 2020 Bihar Legislative Assembly election.

In 2015, he was a candidate from the Katihar assembly on a JDU ticket. In political circle, he is more commonly known as Bijay Singh Nishad. He rose to prominence in the JDU, after getting elected to Bihar Legislative Assembly. In the year 2021, he was appointed the president of Extremely Backward Caste wing of the party by JDU's state president Umesh Singh Kushwaha.
