= Barari Assembly constituency =

Coordinates: 25°32′26″N 87°24′26″E

Barari
- Constituency No. - for the Bihar Legislative Assembly

Constituency details
- Country: India
- Region: East India
- State: Bihar
- Established: 1957
- Total electors: 279,756
- Reservation: None

Member of Legislative Assembly
- 18th Bihar Legislative Assembly
- Incumbent Bijay Singh
- Party: JD(U)
- Alliance: NDA
- Elected year: 2025

Barari Assembly constituency is an assembly constituency in Katihar district in the Indian state of Bihar.It is located near the banks of Kosi river. Nearest railway station is Karhagola Road. Laxmipur aitihashik gurudwara is also located here.

== Overview ==
As per Delimitation of Parliamentary and Assembly constituencies Order, 2008, No 68. Barari Assembly constituency is composed of the following: Barari, Sameli and Kursela community development blocks.

Barari Assembly constituency is part of No 11 Katihar (Lok Sabha constituency).

== Members of the Legislative Assembly ==
| Year | Name | Party |
|---|---|---|
| 1957 | Vasudev Prasad Singh | Indian National Congress |
| 1962 | Vasudev Prasad Singh | Indian National Congress |
| 1967 | Vasudev Prasad Singh | Indian National Congress |
| 1969 | Muhamad Sakoor | Communist Party of India |
| 1972 | Muhamad Sakoor | Indian National Congress |
| 1977 | Vasudev Prasad Singh | Janata Party |
| 1980 | Karuneshwar Singh | Indian National Congress |
| 1985 | Mansoor Alam | Lokdal |
| 1990 | Prem Nath Jaiswal | Independent politician |
| 1995 | Mansoor Alam | Janata Dal |
| 2000 | Mansoor Alam | Rashtriya Janata Dal |
| 2005 | Muhamad Sakoor | Nationalist Congress Party |
| 2005 | Bibhas Chandra Choudhary | Bharatiya Janata Party |
| 2010 | Bibhas Chandra Choudhary | Bharatiya Janata Party |
| 2015 | Neeraj Yadav | Rashtriya Janata Dal |
| 2020 | Bijay Singh | Janata Dal (United) |

== Election results ==
=== 2025 ===
2025 Bihar Legislative Assembly election: Barari
| Party | Candidate | Votes | % | ±% |
|---|---|---|---|---|
| JD(U) | Bijay Singh | 107,842 | 47.18 | +2.47 |
| INC | Tauquir Alam | 96,858 | 42.37 | |
| AIMIM | Md Matiur Rahman | 5,846 | 2.56 | −1.05 |
| Independent | Shivpujan Paswan | 4,962 | 2.17 | |
| JSP | Pritam Prasoon | 3,026 | 1.32 | |
| NOTA | None of the above | 3,047 | 1.33 | −0.67 |
| Majority | | 10,984 | 4.81 | −0.9 |
| Turnout | | 228,594 | 81.71 | +14.48 |
| JD(U) hold | | Swing | | |

=== 2020 ===
2020 Bihar Legislative Assembly election: Barari
| Party | Candidate | Votes | % | ±% |
|---|---|---|---|---|
| JD(U) | Bijay Singh | 81,752 | 44.71 | |
| RJD | Neeraj Kumar | 71,314 | 39.0 | −4.14 |
| LJP | Bibhash Chandra Choudhary | 7,920 | 4.33 | |
| AIMIM | Rakesh Kumar Raushan | 6,598 | 3.61 | |
| Independent | Srikant Mandal | 1,943 | 1.06 | |
| NOTA | None of the above | 3,652 | 2.0 | +0.58 |
| Majority | | 10,438 | 5.71 | −2.98 |
| Turnout | | 182,851 | 67.23 | −2.37 |
| JD(U) gain from RJD | | Swing | | |

=== 2015 ===
2015 Bihar Legislative Assembly election: Barari
| Party | Candidate | Votes | % | ±% |
|---|---|---|---|---|
| RJD | Neeraj Kumar | 71,175 | 43.14 | |
| BJP | Bibhash Chandra Choudhary | 56,839 | 34.45 | |
| NCP | Muhammad Shakur | 11,002 | 6.67 | |
| Independent | Kailash Sahani | 8,484 | 5.14 | |
| Independent | Muhammad Israil | 3,597 | 2.18 | |
| CPI | Dinesh Prasad Yadav | 2,406 | 1.46 | |
| Independent | Yugal Kishor Sah | 2,078 | 1.26 | |
| NOTA | None of the above | 2,344 | 1.42 | |
| Majority | | 14,336 | 8.69 | |
| Turnout | | 164,998 | 69.6 | |
