= Mina Kumari =

Indian politician

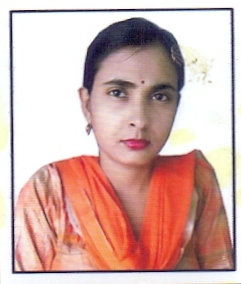

Member of Bihar Legislative Assembly
- Incumbent
- Assumed office 2020
- Constituency: Babubarhi
- Preceded by: Kapil Deo Kamat

Personal details
- Born: 5 April 1989 (age 37)
- Party: JD(U)
- Spouse: Raman Kumar
- Occupation: Politician

Mina Kumari (born 5 April 1989) is an Indian politician from Bihar. She is an MLA from Babubarhi Assembly constituency in Madhubani district, representing Janata Dal (United) Party. She won the 2020 Bihar Legislative Assembly election. She retained the seat for JD (U) in the next election in 2025.

== Early life and education ==
Kumari is from Babubarhi, Madhubani district. She married Raman Kumar, a government teacher. She completed her post graduation in Hindi in 2019 at Lalit Narayan Mithila University, Darbhanga, Bihar. She is the daughter in law of veteran JDU leader Kapil Deo Kamat.

== Career ==
Kumari won the 2020 Bihar Legislative Assembly election from Babubarhi Assembly constituency representing Janata Dal (United) Party. She polled 77,367 votes and defeated her nearest rival, Uma Kant Yadav of Rashtriya Janata Dal, by a margin of 11,488 votes.

In 2025, she contested the Bihar Legislative Assembly election from the same Baburahi Assembly constituency and defeated Arun Kumar Singh of Rashtriya Janata Dal to become the MLA for the second time. She polled 98,221 votes and won by a margin of 17,568.
