= Uday Narayan Choudhary =

Indian politician

14th Speaker of the Bihar Legislative Assembly
- In office 2005–2015

Member of Bihar Legislative Assembly
- In office 2005–2015
- Constituency: Imamganj
- In office 1990–1995

Personal details
- Born: 8 August 1952 (age 73) Bihar, India
- Citizenship: Indian
- Party: RJD
- Other political affiliations: Loktantrik Janata Dal; Janata Dal; Janata Dal United
- Education: Patna University
- Occupation: Politician

Uday Narayan Choudhary is an Indian politician. He served as the Speaker of the Bihar Legislative Assembly from 2005 to 2015. He was a prominent Dalit face in the JD(U) and represented the Imamganj Vidhan Sabha Constituency from 1990 to 1995 and then from 2000 to 2015, losing the 2015 election to former Chief Minister Jitan Ram Manjhi. He crossed over to the Loktantrik Janata Dal in 2018 to protest the breakup of the Mahagathbandhan and JD(U) joining hands with the BJP.

He was also fielded by the Janata Dal (United) as its candidate in the Jamui Lok Sabha constituency in the 2014 Indian general election. Chaudhary was considered a staunch Nitish Kumar loyalist as he scuttled rebellion in the JD(U) in August 2014 by disqualifying 8 rebel MLAs. He received widespread criticism for his February 2014 decision to notify a rebel group of 13 RJD MLAs as a separate entity without physically verifying the signatures to facilitate their merger into the JD(U). However, as of 2017, he opposed JD(U)'s decision to re-join the NDA and has been a vocal critic of the same on different forums.
