= Surendra Prasad Sinha =

Indian politician

Surendra Prasad Sinha was an Indian politician. He was elected to the Bihar Legislative Assembly from Gurua constituency in Bihar in the 2010 Bihar Legislative Assembly election as a member of the Bharatiya Janata Party.

He died in 2022.
