= Saharsa Assembly constituency =

Coordinates: 25°52′14″N 86°36′05″E

Saharsa
- Constituency No. 75 for the Bihar Legislative Assembly

Constituency details
- Country: India
- Region: East India
- State: Bihar
- District: Saharsa
- Established: 1957
- Total electors: 370,709
- Reservation: None

Member of Legislative Assembly
- 18th Bihar Legislative Assembly
- Incumbent Er. I. P. Gupta
- Party: IIP
- Alliance: MGB
- Elected year: 2025

Saharsa Assembly constituency is an assembly constituency in Saharsa district in the Indian state of Bihar.

== Overview ==
As per Delimitation of Parliamentary and Assembly constituencies Order, 2008, No. 75 Saharsa Assembly constituency is composed of the following: Kahara community development block including Saharsa nagar parishad; Saur Bazar CD Block. In 2015 Bihar Legislative Assembly election, Saharsa will be one of the 36 seats to have VVPAT enabled electronic voting machines.

Saharsa Assembly constituency is part of No. 13 Madhepura (Lok Sabha constituency) .

== Members of the Legislative Assembly ==
Year	Name	Party
1957	Vishweshvari Devi	Indian National Congress
1962	Ramesh Jha	Praja Socialist Party
1967	Ramesh Jha	Indian National Congress
1969	Ramesh Jha	Indian National Congress
1972	Ramesh Jha	Indian National Congress
1977	Shankar Prasad Tekriwal	Janata Party
1980	Ramesh Jha	Indian National Congress
1985	Satish Chandra Jha	Indian National Congress
1990	Shankar Prasad Tekriwal	Janata Dal
1995	Shankar Prasad Tekriwal	Janata Dal
2000	Shankar Prasad Tekriwal	Rashtriya Janata Dal
2005	Sanjeev Kumar Jha	Bharatiya Janata Party
2005	Sanjeev Kumar Jha	Bharatiya Janata Party
2010	Alok Ranjan Jha	Bharatiya Janata Party
2015	Arun Kumar Yadav	Rashtriya Janata Dal
2020	Alok Ranjan Jha	Bharatiya Janata Party
2025	Er. I. P. Gupta	Indian Inclusive Party

== Election results ==
=== 2025 ===
Bihar Legislative Assembly Election, 2025: Saharsa
Party	Candidate	Votes	%	±%
IIP	Indrajeet Prasad Gupta	115,036	44.28	
BJP	Alok Ranjan Jha	112,998	43.5	▼2.09
JSP	Kishor Kumar	12,786	4.92	
Independent	Devchandra Yadav	4,353	1.68	
Swadhinta Party	Amar Shankar	2,964	1.14	
NOTA	None of the above	2,607	1.0	▼1.34
Majority		2,038	0.78	▼7.88
Turnout		259,763	70.07	▲8.85
IIP gain from BJP		Swing		

=== 2020 ===
2020 Bihar Legislative Assembly election: Saharsa
Party	Candidate	Votes	%	±%
BJP	Alok Ranjan Jha	103,538	45.59	+12.77
RJD	Lovely Anand	83,859	36.93	−16.1
Independent	Kishor Kumar	12,592	5.54	
Independent	Ranjit Kumar Rana	9,994	4.4	
Independent	Siyaram Paswan	3,276	1.44	
NOTA	None of the above	5,307	2.34	−0.35
Majority		19,679	8.66	−11.55
Turnout		227,106	61.22	+3.51
BJP gain from RJD		Swing		

=== 2015 ===
2015 Bihar Legislative Assembly election: Saharsa
Party	Candidate	Votes	%	±%
RJD	Arun Kumar Yadav	102,850	53.03	
BJP	Alok Ranjan Jha	63,644	32.82	
JAP(L)	Sanjana Devi	6,618	3.41	
Independent	Ramesh Kumar Sharma	3,853	1.99	
CPI(M)	Vinod Kumar	3,253	1.68	
Independent	Ranveer Kumar	1,878	0.97	
NOTA	None of the above	5,211	2.69	
Majority		39,206	20.21	
Turnout		193,947	57.71	
RJD gain from BJP		Swing		
