= Bihar Economic Survey =

बिहार आर्थिक सर्वेक्षण
- Emblem of Bihar

Classification
- Economic Development: Government of Bihar

Period
- Frequency: Annual
- Occasion: First day of budget session

Presentation
- By: Finance Minister
- Venue: Bihar Legislative Assembly

The Bihar Economic Survey is a comprehensive report that provides a detailed analysis of the economic performance in the state of Bihar in India and its trajectory for future development. It is an annual report representing the economy of the state. It is presented at the legislature assembly of the state. It is presented on the first day of budget session by the finance minister of the state.

== Description ==
The Bihar Economic Survey is a document that gives insights into the state economy based on performance of government in various sectors in the last fiscal year. It also underlines the change in the total expenditure of the state compare to the previous fiscal year.

Similarly it examines the major indicators of development in the state of Bihar in India. It provides the information of the per capita income of the state which is one of the major indicators of development.

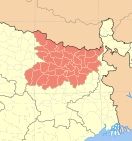
Map of the state of Bihar

The size of economy in the state has seen a significant changes in the current decade. It has increased by 3.5 times compared to the size of economy in the financial year 2011-2012.

== Current edition ==
According to the current edition of the Bihar Economic Survey, the size of the economy of Bihar state was ₹ 9,76,784 crore (US$ 120 billion) in the year 2024-25. The current edition of the economic survey was presented by the present deputy chief minister cum finance minister Samrat Choudhary at the legislative assembly of the Bihar state on 28 February 2025.

The Gross State Domestic Product (GSDP) was ₹ 9,76 lakh crore at current prices for the year 2024-25 as compared to ₹ 8,96 lakh crore in 2023-24 with GDP growth rate of 14% in the year of 2024. In FY 2025-26 GSDP of Bihar is estimated to be ₹ 10,97,264 crore (US$ 130 billion).
