= Arun Kumar Yadav (Saharsa politician) =

Bihar politician

Bihar Legislative Assembly
- In office 2015–2020
- Preceded by: Alok Ranjan Jha
- Succeeded by: Alok Ranjan Jha
- Constituency: Saharsa

Personal details
- Born: 6 March 1950 (age 76) Aaran, Bihar, India
- Party: Rashtriya Janata Dal
- Parent: Lakshmi Prasad Yadav
- Education: Master of Arts
- Occupation: Farmer
- Profession: Politician

Arun Kumar Yadav is an Indian politician and a member of Bihar Legislative Assembly of India. He represents the Saharsa constituency in Saharsa district of Bihar, he was elected in 2015 as a member of Rashtriya Janata Dal. He also participated in the Bihar Movement in 1974.
