= Satyanarayan Singh Yadav =

Indian politician

Satyanarayan Singh Yadav is an Indian politician. He was elected to the Bihar Legislative Assembly from Dehri in the 2019 by election as a member of the Bharatiya Janata Party. By-elections happen due to Disqualification Of Mohammad Iliyas Hussain.He became MLA twice from RJD in 2005. Before him, CPI-ML's Rajaram Singh was MLA from Obra assembly constituency for ten years. RJD's base voters were feeling a void. Veteran Ram Bilas Singh lost in 1995 and Ramnaresh Singh lost in 2000. RJD needed a clean and acceptable face to the whole society. When Satyanarayan Singh came, being of business character, he was successful in preventing polarization of votes in favor of CPI-ML against his party. As a result, in February 2005, he was successful in defeating Rajaram by 3875 votes by getting 38575 votes. But the government was not formed and the bugle for mid-term elections was sounded. Elections were held again in October 2005. A new candidate from JDU was Pramod Singh Chandravanshi. He again faced Rajaram and won by 8595 votes, securing 32618 votes.He is known for his social and planation program on the bank of river son. He became the first person who got selected as MLA of dehri from BJP(NDA) after independence.
