= Dhamdaha Assembly constituency =

Coordinates: 25°43′05″N 87°12′49″E

Dhamdaha
- Constituency No. - for the Bihar Legislative Assembly

Constituency details
- Country: India
- Region: East India
- State: Bihar
- District: Purnia
- Established: 1957
- Total electors: 314,949
- Reservation: None

Member of Legislative Assembly
- 18th Bihar Legislative Assembly
- Incumbent Leshi Singh; Former Cabinet Minister, Bihar
- Party: JD(U)
- Alliance: NDA
- Elected year: 2025
- Preceded by: Dilip Kumar Yadav; RJD

Dhamdaha is an assembly constituency in Purnia district in the Indian state of Bihar. Leshi Singh is the current MLA from Dhamdaha.

== Overview ==
As per Delimitation of Parliamentary and Assembly constituencies Order, 2008, No 61. Dhamdaha Assembly constituency is composed of the following: Dhamdaha community development blocks; Banbhag Chunapur, Bithnouli Khemchand East, Bithnouli Khemchand West, Ganeshpur, Gangaili, Gowasi, Kajha, Majra, Parora, Rahuwa, Sahara, Satkodariya, Gokulpur, Jagni and Pothia Rampur of Krityanand Nagar CD Block. Around 2010, local people renovated the Hanuman temple situated at the main road and it very soon caught the eye of nearby localities. The subdivision also has notable theater "Chitralaya". Dhamdaha High school one of the oldest has reputation of giving notable officers to the state and country.

Dhamdaha Assembly constituency is part of No 12 Purnia (Lok Sabha constituency).

== Members of the Legislative Assembly ==
Year	Name	Party
1957	Bhola Paswan Shastri	Indian National Congress
1957	Lakshmi Narayan Sudhanshu	Indian National Congress
1962	Lakshmi Narayan Sudhanshu	Indian National Congress
1967	Lakshmi Narayan Sudhanshu	Indian National Congress
1969	Kalika Prasad Singh	Samyukta Socialist Party
1972	Jai Narayan Mehta	Indian National Congress
1977	Surya Narayan Yadav	Janata Party
1980	Surya Narayan Yadav	Janata Party (Secular)
1985	Amarnath Tiwari	Indian National Congress
1990	Amarnath Tiwari	Indian National Congress
1995	Dilip Kumar Yadav	Janata Dal
2000	Leshi Singh	Samata Party
2005	Leshi Singh	Janata Dal (United)
2005	Dilip Kumar Yadav	Rashtriya Janata Dal
2010	Leshi Singh	Janata Dal (United)
2015	Leshi Singh	Janata Dal (United)
2020	Leshi Singh	Janata Dal (United)
2025	Leshi Singh	Janata Dal (United)

== Election results ==
=== 2025 ===
Bihar Legislative Assembly Election, 2025: Dhamdaha
Party	Candidate	Votes	%	±%
JD(U)	Leshi Singh	138,750	57.32	+8.82
RJD	Santosh Kumar Kushwaha	83,591	34.53	+2.82
AIMIM	Mohd Ishtiyaque Alam	5,126	2.12	
Independent	Vindeshwari Sharma	3,032	1.25	
NOTA	None of the above	6,781	2.8	+2.1
Majority		55,159	22.79	+6.0
Turnout		242,065	76.86	+13.48
JD(U) hold		Swing		

=== 2020 ===
2020 Bihar Legislative Assembly election: Dhamdaha
Party	Candidate	Votes	%	±%
JD(U)	Leshi Singh	97,057	48.5	+8.35
RJD	Dilip Kumar Yadav	63,463	31.71	
LJP	Yogendra Kumar	9,448	4.72	
Independent	Ashish Anuj	4,336	2.17	
RLSP	Ramesh Kumar Mehta	3,398	1.7	−22.45
Independent	Bindeshwari Sharma	2,525	1.26	
Independent	Maneesh Kumar Yadav	2,523	1.26	
Independent	Brajesh Kumar Thakur	2,515	1.26	
Janta Dal Rashtravadi	Brahchari Vyas Nandan	2,058	1.03	+0.38
Independent	Subhash Kumar Rajak	2,001	1.0	
NCP	Md Gaisul Azam	1,869	0.93	
NOTA	None of the above	1,392	0.7	−2.46
Majority		33,594	16.79	+0.79
Turnout		200,132	63.38	−1.89
JD(U) hold		Swing		

=== 2015 ===
2015 Bihar Legislative Assembly election: Dhamdaha
Party	Candidate	Votes	%	±%
JD(U)	Leshi Singh	76,027	40.15	
RLSP	Shiv Shankar Thakur Allias Shankar Azad	45,736	24.15	
JAP(L)	Dilip Kumar Yadav	12,667	6.69	
CPI(M)	Mithlesh Kumar Singh	4,991	2.64	
Independent	Jyoti Rani	4,144	2.19	
Independent	Pappu Kumar Ranjan	3,924	2.07	
Independent	Yogendra Kumar	3,776	1.99	
JMM	Tahammul Mansuri	3,656	1.93	
SS	Bimal Roy	3,378	1.78	
CPI(ML)L	Pankaj Kumar Singh	2,740	1.45	
Independent	Chand Dev Paswan	2,554	1.35	
Sarvajan Kalyan Loktantrik Party	Sudama Kumar	2,242	1.18	
BSP	Tarun Kumar Singh	2,132	1.13	
Independent	Niranjan Kumar Singh	2,094	1.11	
Rashtriya Jankranti Party	Sunil Ray	1,766	0.93	
NOTA	None of the above	5,990	3.16	
Majority		30,291	16.0	
Turnout		189,356	65.27	

== External 2010links ==
- "Results of all Bihar Assembly elections". eci.gov.in. Election Commission of India.
