= Shubhanand Mukesh =

Indian politician

Member of the Bihar Legislative Assembly
- Incumbent
- Assumed office 14 November 2025
- Preceded by: Pawan Kumar Yadav
- Constituency: Kahalgaon

Personal details
- Born: Bihar
- Party: Janata Dal (United)
- Other political affiliations: Indian National Congress
- Profession: Politician

Shubhanand Mukesh is an Indian politician from Bihar. He is elected as a Member of Legislative Assembly in 2025 Bihar Legislative Assembly election from Kahalgaon constituency.

== Early life and education ==
Shubhanand Mukesh was born in Bihar to Sadanand Singh.

He did his schooling at G D Birla Memorial School, (Class of 1994) a boarding hostel in Ranikhet, Uttarakhand.

== Political career ==
Shubhanand Mukesh won from Kahalgaon constituency representing Janata Dal (United) in the 2025 Bihar Legislative Assembly election. He polled 1,30,767 votes and defeated his nearest rival, Rajnish Bharti of Rashtriya Janata Dal, by a margin of 50,112 votes. Earlier he contested in the 2020 Bihar Legislative Assembly election as Indian National Congress and lost to his nearest rival Bharatiya Janata Party's Pawan Kumar Yadav by a margin of 42,893 votes.
