= Neeraj Yadav (politician) =

Indian politician (died 2023)

Member of the Bihar Legislative Assembly
- In office 2015–2020
- Preceded by: Bibhas Chandra Choudhary
- Succeeded by: Bijay Singh
- Constituency: Barari

Personal details
- Born: Korha, Katihar district, Bihar, India
- Died: 3 April 2023 Purnia district, Bihar, India
- Party: Rashtriya Janata Dal
- Spouse: Baby Yadav
- Parent: Janardan Parsad (Father)
- Education: B.A From K.B.M College Katihar Bhupendra Narayan Mandal University
- Occupation: Politician, social worker

Neeraj Yadav (died 3 April 2023) was an Indian politician who was elected as a member of Bihar Legislative Assembly from Barari constituency in 2015 as the candidate of Rashtriya Janata Dal but lost to Bijay Singh in 2020 elections.

== Death ==
Yadav died at Max Hospital in Purnia district, Bihar, on 3 April 2023.

== See also ==
- Barari Assembly constituency
