= Uma Kant Yadav =

Politician

Member of the Bihar Legislative Assembly
- In office 2010–2015
- Preceded by: Kapil Deo Kamat
- Succeeded by: Kapil Deo Kamat
- Constituency: Babubarhi
- In office 2003–2005
- Preceded by: Deo Narayan Yadav
- Succeeded by: Kapil Deo Kamat

Personal details
- Born: Rahikpur, Madhubani, Bihar
- Party: Rashtriya Janata Dal
- Parent: Baldev Yadav
- Occupation: Agriculturist
- Profession: Politician; Social Worker

Uma Kant Yadav is an Indian politician and a member of Bihar Legislative Assembly of India. Yadav was elected in 2003 by polls to fill the vacancy due to the death of Deo Narayan Yadav. He was again elected in 2010 as a member of Rashtriya Janata Dal from the Babubarhi constituency in the Madhubani district of Bihar.
