= Prafull Kumar Singh =

Indian politician

Prafull Kumar Manjhi

Member of Bihar Legislative Assembly
- Incumbent
- Assumed office 2020
- Preceded by: Sudhir Kumar
- Constituency: Sikandra

Personal details
- Party: HAM(S)
- Occupation: Politician

Prafull Kumar Manjhi (born 1967), also known as Prafull Kumar Manjhi, is an Indian politician from Bihar. He is a member of the Bihar Legislative Assembly, winning the Sikandra Assembly constituency which is reserved for Scheduled Caste community in Jamui district. He won on the Hindustani Awam Morcha (Secular) ticket in the 2020 Bihar Legislative Assembly election.

== Early life and education ==
Manjhi is from Lakhisarai, Jamui district, Bihar. He is the son of Sidheshwar Manjhi. He completed his graduation at Shree Karynand Sharma Smarak College, Lakhisarai which is affiliated with Bhagalpur University.

== Career ==
Manjhi won from Sikandra Assembly constituency representing HAM in the 2020 Bihar Legislatie Assembly election. He polled 47,061 votes and defeated his nearest rival, Sudhir Kumar of Indian National Congress, by a margin of 5,505 votes.
