= Radhanandan Jha =

Indian politician

- राधानंदन झा

Personal details
- Born: Lakhnaur, Bihar; 7 July 1929 Lakhnaur, Bihar
- Died: 22 January 2005 (aged 75) Lakhnaur, Bihar
- Party: Indian National Congress
- Spouse: late Ram kumari jha
- Children: 3 sons 1 daughter
- Parent: late somnath jha
- Education: M.A, Phd
- Website: http://vidhansabha.bih.nic.in/

Radha Nandan Jha (Hindi: राधानंदन झा) (1929–2005)) was an Indian politician from the Congress Party who served as the Speaker of Bihar Vidhan Sabha and Deputy speaker of Bihar. He belonged to the Indian National Congress party and represented the Madhepur constituency in the Bihar Legislative Assembly.

Radhanandan Jha was born in Lakhnaur, a village in Madhubani District of Bihar, to a freedom fighter.

== See also ==
- List of politicians from Bihar
