= Onkarnath Baranwal =

Indian politician

Batiya, Jamui
- Incumbent
- Assumed office 2010
- Succeeded by: Jharkhand Vikas Morcha
- Constituency: Chakai

Personal details
- Born: 1970 (age 55–56) Bihar
- Party: Jharkhand Vikas Morcha
- Parent: Yamuna Prasad Baranwal
- Occupation: Politics

Onkarnath Baranwal (Hindi: ओंकारनाथ बरनवाल) is a politician from Batiya, Bihar, in eastern India. He won election 2010 from Chakai constitute by Jharkhand Vikas Morcha party. He was born in 1970 in Bihar. His father name was Shri Yamuna Prasad Baranwal.

== See also ==
- List of politicians from Bihar
