= Upendra Prasad =

Indian politician

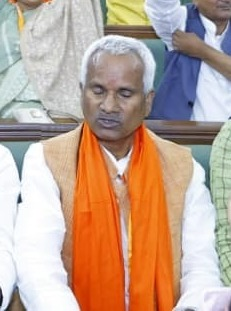

Member of Bihar Legislative Council
- In office 5 August 2009 – 6 May 2018
- Preceded by: Ram Badan Rai
- Constituency: elected by the Legislative Assembly Members

Personal details
- Born: 5 January 1964 (age 62) Rohwe, Imamganj, Gaya district, Bihar
- Party: Bharatiya Janata Party
- Other political affiliations: Hindustani Awam Morcha (2019-24); Janata Dal (United) (till 2019)
- Parent: Janardan Prasad (father)
- Education: M.A. (Economics), Ph.D, L.L.B.
- Alma mater: Patna University

Upendra Prasad also known as Upendra Dangi is an Indian politician. He was elected to the Bihar Legislative Council as a member of Janata Dal (United). He later joined Hindustani Awam Morcha.

Prasad contested the Bihar Legislative Assembly election of 2025 as a member of Bharatiya Janata Party from Gurua Assembly constituency and was elected to Bihar Legislative Assembly for the first time.
