= Sadanand Singh =

Indian politician (1943–2021)

Speaker of the Bihar Legislative Assembly
- In office 2000-2005
- Constituency: Kahalgaon

Member of Legislative Assembly
- In office 1969–1990
- In office 2000–2005
- In office 2010–2020

Personal details
- Born: Sadanand Singh; 21 May 1943 Dhuabai, Bhagalpur
- Died: 8 September 2021 (aged 78)
- Party: Indian National Congress
- Spouse: Meena Singh
- Children: 2 son and 3 daughters
- Education: Marwadi College, Bhagalpur
- Profession: Farmer and Businessman

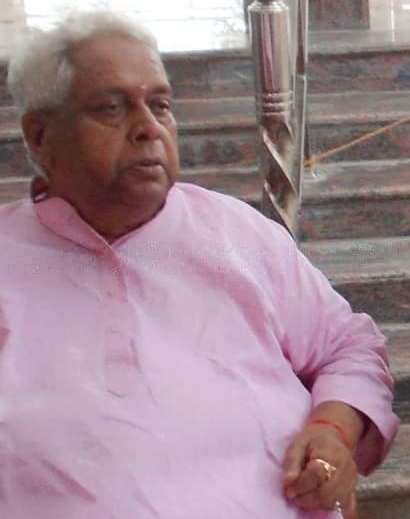
Sadanand Singh (2018)

Sadanand Singh (21 May 1943 – 8 September 2021) was an Indian politician. He was the former Speaker of the Bihar Assembly.

== Life ==
Sadanand Singh was born in a Kurmi family of Bihar. He served as member of Bihar Legislative Assembly for nine terms from Kahalgaon Assembly constituency of Bhagalpur. Between 2000-05, he served as speaker of Bihar Legislative Assembly as well as minister in Government of Bihar. He was a president of Bihar Provincial Congress Committee for two terms. Singh had a long political life spanning over five decades and in this long political career, he lost the assembly elections only thrice like in 1990 and 1995.

His son Shubhanand Mukesh contested in 2020 Bihar Legislative Assembly election from Kahalgaon Assembly constituency, but lost to Bharatiya Janata Party candidate, Pawan Kumar Yadav.

Singh was revered by the leaders of Bihar, cutting across their party line. Senior leaders of Bihar, Nitish Kumar and Lalu Prasad Yadav considered him as mass leader.

Singh was known for his developmental activities. He led establishment of a power grid at Kahalgaon and a power sub station at Sanhaul in his constituency, which provided uninterrupted supply of electricity to the people of this area.

== See also ==
- Tulsidas Mehta
- Jandaha Assembly constituency
- Shubhanand Mukesh
