= Shankarpur Khawas =

Village in Bihar, India

- Village
- Location within Bihar Location within India
- Coordinates: 25°12′08″N 87°08′53″E
- Country: India
- State: Bihar
- District: Bhagalpur
- Block: Colgong

Government
  - Type: Sarpanch

Area
  - Total: 76.58 km^{2} (29.57 sq mi)
- Elevation: 39 m (128 ft)

Population (2011)
  - Total: 38,852
  - Density: 507.3/km^{2} (1,314/sq mi)

Languages
  - Official: Hindi, Angika
- Time zone: UTC+5:30 (IST)
- PIN: 813205
- STD code: 06429
- Vehicle registration: BR-10

Shankarpur Khawas is a village in Colgong Block, Bhagalpur District, Bihar, India. It is situated near the state border with Jharkhand, about 16 kilometres east of the district seat of Bhagalpur, and 12 kilometres southwest of the block seat of Kahalgaon. In 2011, it had a population of 38,852.

== Geography ==
Shankarpur Khawas is located south of the Ganges River. National Highway 33 is to the north. The village covers an area of 7658 hectares.

== Demographics ==
According to the 2011 Indian Census, Shankarpur Khawas has 6,610 households. Among the 38,852 residents, 20,695 are male and 18,157 are female. The total literacy rate is 47.94%, with 11,423 of the male population and 7,201 of the female population being literate. The census location code is 239116.
