= Indian Inclusive Party =

Indian political party founded in 2025

- Abbreviation: IIP
- Leader: Indrajeet Prasad Gupta
- President: Indrajeet Prasad Gupta
- Treasurer: K. Raj
- Founder: Indrajeet Prasad Gupta
- Founded: 11 October 2025; 13 months ago
- Headquarters: Patna, Bihar
- Political position: Centre-left
- Colours: Blue White Green
- Slogan: "Inclusive India, Progressive Bihar"
- ECI status: RUPP
- Alliance: I.N.D.I.A (from 2025); MGB (from 2025)
- Seats in Rajya Sabha: 0 / 245
- Seats in Lok Sabha: 0 / 543
- Seats in Bihar Legislative Assembly: 1 / 243
- Seats in Bihar Legislative Council: 0 / 75

Election symbol
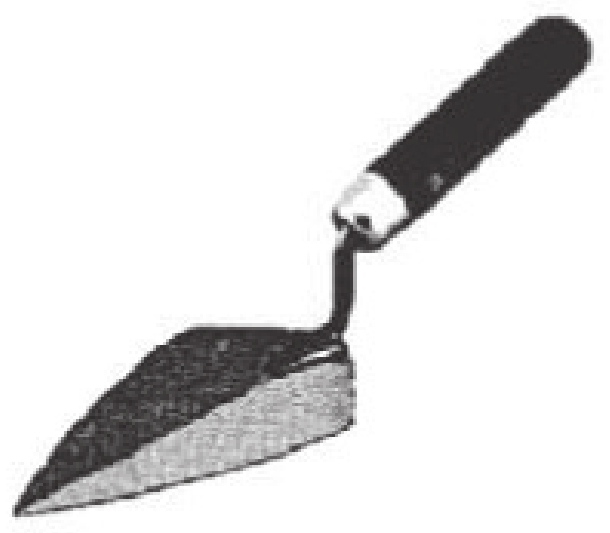
- Brick Trowel

Party flag
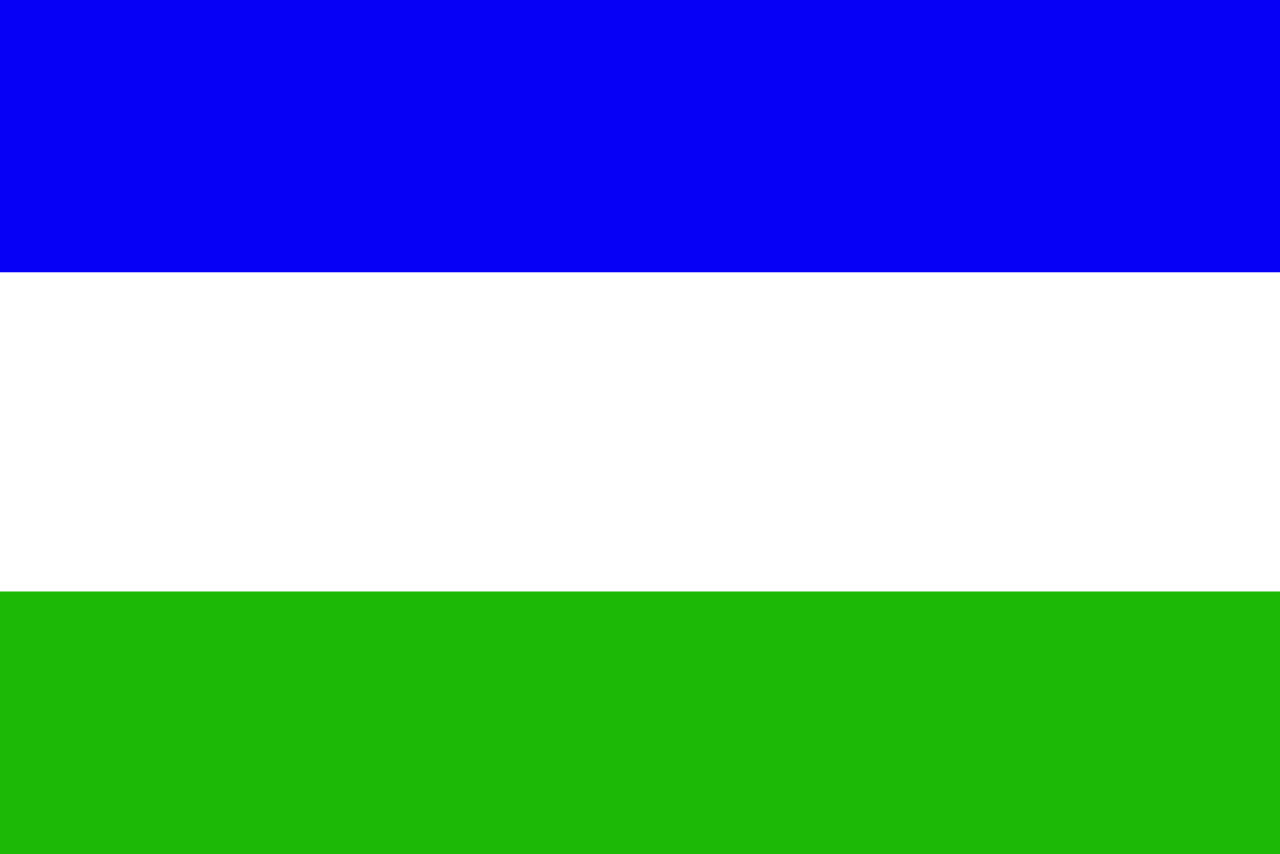

Website
- Indian Inclusive Party

The Indian Inclusive Party (IIP) is an Indian political party based in Bihar, focused on Pan caste politics as shown in its slogan "haanko rath hum Pan hain" ("drive the chariot; we are Pan"). Founded in October 2025 by Indrajeet Prasad Gupta, the party positions itself as an inclusive, people-centric alternative focused on social justice, transparency and grassroots empowerment.

== History ==
The Indian Inclusive Party was previously known as Indian Inqlab Party that was formally announced on 13th April 2025 at Patna Gandhi Maidan. The Indian Inclusive Party got registered with Election Commission of India and launched operations in October 2025 under the leadership of Indrajeet Prasad Gupta. The party emphasised youth participation, representation of marginalized communities, and a platform against corrupt and caste-based patronage politics.

In the run up to the 2025 Bihar Legislative Assembly election, the party received media attention and outreach from larger alliances. IIP leaders met with regional alliance figures during October 2025 as the party explored electoral cooperation.

== Leadership Office holders ==
S.No.	Portrait	Name	Term in office		
S.No.	Portrait	Name	Assumed office	Left office	Time in office
1		Indrajeet Prasad Gupta; President Indian Inclusive Party	11 October 2025	Incumbent	1 year, 33 days
2		Prof. K. Raj; Treasurer Indian Inclusive Party	11 October 2025	Incumbent	1 year, 33 days

== Ideology and vision ==
The party's platform emphasises inclusive development, transparency in governance, social justice and empowerment of marginalized communities. IIP advocates stronger youth participation, women's representation, and policies to reduce corruption and unemployment.

== Bihar Legislative Assembly election, 2025 ==
IIP fielded candidates in the 2025 Bihar Legislative Assembly election; several nominations were accepted by the Election Commission of India in October 2025. Notable candidatures included:

- Saharsa – Indrajeet Prasad Gupta.
- Jamalpur – Narendra Kumar.
- Beldaur – Tanisha Bharti.

President of Indian Inclusive Party, Indrajeet Prasad Gupta won Saharsa Assembly election while two other contestants from IIP, Narendra Kumar Tanti & Tanisha Bharti lost their election from Jamalpur and Beldaur assembly respectively.

=== Bihar State Legislative Assembly election ===
Year	Seats won/ Seats contested	Change in seats	Total Vote	Party President	Image
2025	1 / 3	▲1	184,679	I. P. Gupta	

== Members of Legislative Assembly ==
District	No.	Constituency	Name	Party	Alliance	Popular Vote	Margin	Result
Bihar Legislative Assembly 2025
Saharsa	1	Saharsa	Indrajeet Prasad Gupta	IIP	MGB	1,15,036	2,038	Won
