= List of speakers of the Bihar Legislative Assembly =

Speakers of the Bihar Legislative Assembly

Speaker of the Bihar Legislative Assembly
- Seal of Bihar

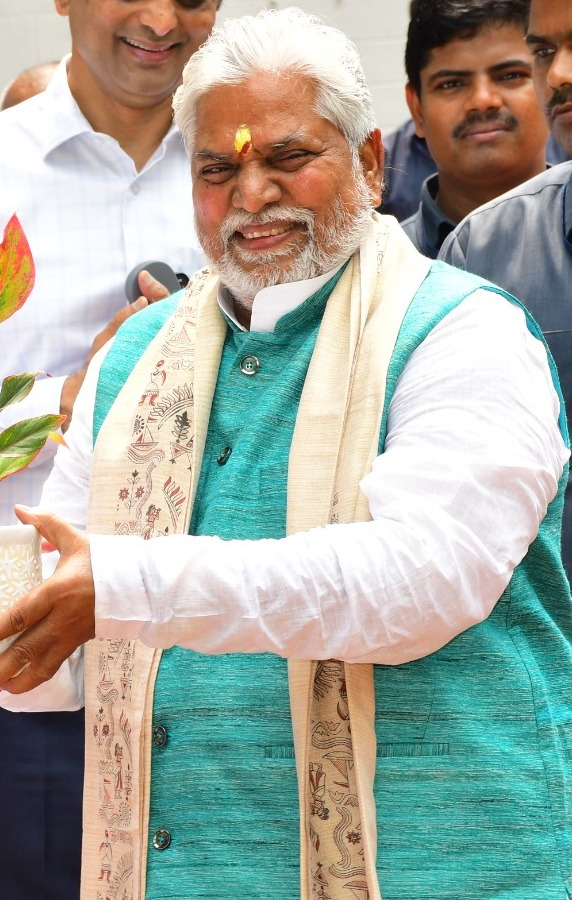
- Incumbent; Dr. Prem Kumar since 01 December 2025
- Bihar Legislative Assembly
- Style: The Hon’ble (formal); Mr. Speaker (informal)
- Member of: Bihar Legislative Assembly
- Residence: Patna
- Appointer: Members of the Legislative Assembly
- Term length: During the life of the Bihar Legislative Assembly (five years maximum)
- Inaugural holder: Ram Dayalu Singh
- Deputy: Narendra Narayan Yadav

The Speaker of the Bihar Legislative Assembly is the presiding officer of the Legislative Assembly of Bihar, the main law-making body for the Indian state of Bihar. The Speaker is elected in the very first meeting of the Bihar Legislative Assembly after the general elections for a term of 5 years from amongst the members of the assembly. Speakers hold office until ceasing to be a member of the assembly or resigning from the office. The Speaker can be removed from office by a resolution passed in the assembly by an effective majority of its members. In the absence of Speaker, the meeting is presided by the Deputy Speaker.

== List ==
#	Portrait	Name	Term			Assembly	Party
1		Ram Dayalu Singh	23 July 1937	11 November 1944	7 years, 111 days	1st	Indian National Congress
After Independence
1		Bindeshwari Prasad Verma	25 April 1946	14 March 1962	15 years, 323 days		Indian National Congress
1		Bindeshwari Prasad Verma	25 April 1946	14 March 1962	15 years, 323 days	1st	Indian National Congress
1		Bindeshwari Prasad Verma	25 April 1946	14 March 1962	15 years, 323 days	2nd	Indian National Congress
2		Lakshmi Narayan Sudhanshu	15 March 1962	15 March 1967	5 years, 0 days	3rd	Indian National Congress
3		Dhanik Lal Mandal	16 March 1967	10 March 1969	1 year, 359 days	4th	Samyukta Socialist Party
4		Ram Narayan Mandal	11 March 1969	20 March 1972	3 years, 9 days	5th	Indian National Congress
5		Harinath Mishra	21 March 1972	26 June 1977	5 years, 97 days	6th	Indian National Congress
6		Tripurari Prasad Singh	28 June 1977	22 June 1980	2 years, 360 days	7th	Janata Party
7		Radhanandan Jha	24 June 1980	1 April 1985	4 years, 281 days	8th	Indian National Congress (I)
8		Shivchandra Jha	4 April 1985	23 January 1989	3 years, 294 days	9th	Indian National Congress
9		Md Hidayatullah Khan	27 March 1989	19 March 1990	357 days	9th	Indian National Congress
10		Ghulam Sarwar	20 March 1990	9 April 1995	5 years, 20 days	10th	Janata Dal
11		Deo Narayan Yadav	12 April 1995	6 March 2000	4 years, 329 days	11th	Janata Dal
11		Deo Narayan Yadav	12 April 1995	6 March 2000	4 years, 329 days	11th	Rashtriya Janata Dal
12		Sadanand Singh	9 March 2000	28 June 2005	5 years, 111 days	12th	Indian National Congress
13		Uday Narayan Choudhary	30 November 2005	29 November 2010	9 years, 360 days	14th	Janata Dal (United)
13		Uday Narayan Choudhary	2 December 2010	20 November 2015	9 years, 360 days	15th	Janata Dal (United)
14		Vijay Kumar Chaudhary	21 November 2015	24 November 2020	5 years, 3 days	16th	Janata Dal (United)
15		Vijay Kumar Sinha	25 November 2020	24 August 2022	1 year, 272 days	17th	Bharatiya Janata Party
16		Awadh Bihari Choudhary	26 August 2022	12 February 2024	1 year, 170 days	17th	Rashtriya Janata Dal
17		Nand Kishore Yadav	15 February 2024	30 November 2025	1 year, 288 days	17th	Bharatiya Janata Party
18		Dr. Prem Kumar	2 December 2025	Incumbent	297 days	18th	Bharatiya Janata Party

== Pro tem Speaker ==
Narendra Narayan Yadav was appointed as the Pro tem on 24 November 2025 after the conclusion of 2025 Bihar Legislative Assembly election to facilitate the oath taking of new MLAs and the election of the new Assembly Speaker.

== Deputy ==
=== List of Pro tem Speakers ===
- Sadanand Singh 2015
- Jitan Ram Manjhi 2020
- Narendra Narayan Yadav 2025
