= Bindeshwari Prasad Verma =

Indian politician

Vindhyeshwari Prasad Varma
- Binda babu

1st Speaker of Bihar Legislative Assembly
- In office 25 April 1946 – 14 March 1962

Personal details
- Born: September 26, 1886
- Died: July 22, 1968 (aged 81)
- Occupation: Politician
- Awards: Padma Bhushan (1961)

Vindhyeshwari Prasad Varma also known as Binda Babu, was a politician from Bihar state of India who led Bihar Legislative Assembly as a first Speaker in independent India from 1946 to 1962. He was awarded India's third highest civilian award Padma Bhushan in 1961 by President of India.

== Early life ==
Vindhyeshwari Prasad Varma was born in a Zamindar Kayastha family of Manpura, Goraul in Vaishali district. He was against tribal culture or Dravidian principles which led to massacres and riots all over the country in the name of 'freedom struggle'.. He was very brilliant in his studies. He topped the L.L.B. course from Allahabad University with distinction where he met Jawaharlal Nehru and supported his endeavor for suppressed castes (Agricultural people of India). He joined the Indian Freedom Struggle at early age of 16. He attended a public meeting for freedom struggle which coincided with marriage ceremony of freedom fighter Maghfoor Ahmad Ajazi. In this meeting which was also attended by Shafi Daudi, Binda babu and Deep babu, anti-British Raj and pro-freedom slogans were raised.
