= Deo Narayan Yadav =

Indian politician

12th Speaker of the Bihar Legislative Assembly
- In office 12 April 1995 – 06 March 2000
- Preceded by: Ghulam Sarwar
- Succeeded by: Sadanand Singh

Member of Bihar Legislative Assembly, Babubarhi constituency
- In office 2000–2003
- Preceded by: Self
- Succeeded by: Uma Kant Yadav

Member of Bihar Legislative Assembly, Babubarhi constituency
- In office 1995–2000
- Preceded by: Self

Member of Bihar Legislative Assembly, Babubarhi constituency
- In office 1990–1995
- Preceded by: Self
- Succeeded by: Self

Member of Bihar Legislative Assembly, Babubarhi constituency
- In office 1977–1980
- Preceded by: Constituency Not exit
- Succeeded by: Mahendra Narayan Jha

Personal details
- Born: Madhubani, Bihar, India
- Died: 4 March 2003 (82 years) Patna, Bihar, India
- Party: Rashtriya Janata Dal (1995-till death); Janata Dal (Before-1995)
- Profession: Politician; Social Worker
- Website: http://www.vidhansabha.bih.nic.

Deo Narayan Yadav (died 4 March, 2003) was an Indian politician and freedom fighter, elected first time 1952–1957 and 1957–1962 from Ladaniya constituency (now Babubarhi constituency). He was a member of the first ministry of Bihar led by Krishana Sinha. Yadav served as the 12th Speaker of the Bihar Legislative Assembly from 1995–2000. He represented the Babubarhi Constituency in Madhubani from 1977–1980 and 1990-till death. Yadav died at his official residence on Tuesday, 82 years old and sitting Rashtriya Janata Dal MLA from Babubarhi assembly seat in Madhubani. Bihar Governor V C Pande, assembly Speaker Sadanand Singh, Bihar Legislative Council chairman Prof. Jabir Hussain, Chief Minister Rabri Devi and RJD supremo's Lalu Prasad Yadav expressed grief and shock at the sudden demise of Yadav.

== Memories ==
- Dev Narayan Yadav College
