= Sikandra, Bihar Assembly constituency =

Assembly constituency in Bihar, India

Coordinates: 24.96°N 86.03°E

Sikandra
- Constituency No. 240 for the Bihar Legislative Assembly

Constituency details
- Country: India
- Region: East India
- State: Bihar
- District: Jamui
- Lok Sabha constituency: Jamui
- Established: 1962
- Total electors: 301,506
- Reservation: SC

Member of Legislative Assembly
- 18th Bihar Legislative Assembly
- Incumbent Praful Manjhi
- Party: HAM(S)
- Alliance: NDA
- Elected year: 2025
- Preceded by: Sudhir Kumar, INC

Sikandra is an assembly constituency for Bihar Legislative Assembly in Jamui district of Bihar, India. It comes under Jamui (Lok Sabha constituency).

== Members of the Legislative Assembly ==
Year	Member	Party
1962	Mushtaque Ahmed Shah	Indian National Congress
1967	S. Vivekanand	Samyukta Socialist Party
1969	Rameshwar Paswan	Indian National Congress
1972	Rameshwar Paswan	Indian National Congress
1977	Nagina Chaudhary	Janata Party
1980	Rameshwar Paswan	Independent politician
1985	Rameshwar Paswan	Indian National Congress
1990	Chandan Kumar	Communist Party of India
1995	Chandan Kumar	Communist Party of India
2000	Chandan Kumar	Kosal Party
2005	Rameshwar Paswan	Lok Janshakti Party
2005	Rameshwar Paswan	Janata Dal (United)
2010	Rameshwar Paswan	Janata Dal (United)
2015	Sudhir Kumar	Indian National Congress
2020	Prafull Kumar Manjhi	Hindustani Awam Morcha
2025	Prafull Kumar Manjhi	Hindustani Awam Morcha

== Election results ==
=== 2025 ===
Detailed Results at: https://results.eci.gov.in/ResultAcGenNov2025/ConstituencywiseS04240.htm

Bihar Assembly election, 2025: Sikandra
Party	Candidate	Votes	%	±%
HAM(S)	Prafull Manjhi	91,603	47.16	+16.49
RJD	Uday Narain Choudhary	67,696	34.85	
JSP	Subhash Chandra Bosh	12,298	6.33	
AIMIM	Manoj Das	10,701	5.51	
INC	Vinod Kumar Chaudhary	1,803	0.93	−26.16
NOTA	None of the above	3,825	1.97	+0.01
Majority		23,907	12.31	+8.73
Turnout		194,223	64.42	+11.29
HAM(S) hold		Swing		

=== 2020 ===
Bihar Assembly election, 2020: Sikandra
Party	Candidate	Votes	%	±%
HAM(S)	Prafull Kumar Manjhi	47,061	30.67	
INC	Sudhir Kumar	41,556	27.09	▼15.57
Independent	Subhash Chandra Bosh	18,105	11.8	
LJP	Ravishankar Paswan	10,703	6.98	▼29.91
Independent	Er. Indrajeet Prasad Gupta	7,576	4.94	
RLSP	Nandlal Ravidas	7,284	4.75	
Independent	Sindhu Kumar Paswan	4,724	3.08	
Independent	Shiv Shankar Choudhary	3,113	2.03	
Independent	Rameshwar Paswan	2,153	1.4	
Independent	Dharmendra Paswan	2,025	1.32	
Aam Janmat Party	Brahamdeo Anand Paswan	1,762	1.15	
BMP	Vishnu Priya	1,434	0.93	▼1.39
NOTA	None of the above	3,014	1.96	▼0.87
Majority		5,505	3.58	▼2.19
Turnout		153,426	53.13	▲3.37
HAM(S) gain from INC		Swing		

=== 2015 ===
2015 Bihar Legislative Assembly election: Sikandra
Party	Candidate	Votes	%	±%
INC	Sudhir Kumar Alias Banty Choudhary	59,092	42.66	
LJP	Subhash Chandra Bosh	51,102	36.89	
CPI	Girja Choudhry	8,026	5.79	
Garib Janta Dal (Secular)	Golden Kumar	4,431	3.2	
Independent	Shiv Shankar Prasad Choudhary	3,372	2.43	
Samras Samaj Party	Ravishankar Paswan	3,350	2.42	
BMP	Jagdish Prasad Das	3,213	2.32	
BSP	Rekha Das	2,021	1.46	
NOTA	None of the above	3,924	2.83	
Majority		7,990	5.77	
Turnout		138,531	49.76	
