= Babubarhi Assembly constituency =

Coordinates: 26°26′01″N 86°16′19″E

- Constituency No. 34 for the Bihar Legislative Assembly

Constituency details
- Country: India
- Region: East India
- State: Bihar
- District: Madhubani
- Established: 1977
- Total electors: 308,096
- Reservation: None

Member of Legislative Assembly
- 18th Bihar Legislative Assembly
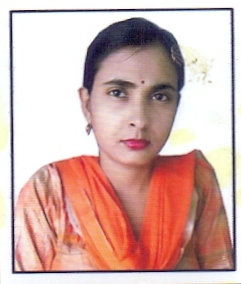
- Incumbent Mina Kumari
- Party: JD(U)
- Alliance: NDA
- Elected year: 2025

Babubarhi Assembly constituency is an assembly constituency in Madhubani district in the Indian state of Bihar.

== Overview ==
As per Delimitation of Parliamentary and Assembly constituencies Order, 2008, No. 34 Babubarhi Assembly constituency is composed of the following: Babubarhi and Ladania community development blocks; Sukki, Kanhauli, Bhakua, Chandardih, Inarwa, Chandargobraura North and Chandargobraura South gram panchayats of Khajauli CD Block.

Babubarhi Assembly constituency is part of No. 7 Jhanjharpur (Lok Sabha constituency).

== Members of Legislative Assembly ==
| Year | Name | Party |
|---|---|---|
| 1977 | Deo Narayan Yadav | Janata Party |
| 1980 | Mahendra Narain Jha | Indian National Congress (I) |
| 1985 | Guna Nand Jha | Indian National Congress |
| 1990 | Deo Narayan Yadav | Janata Dal |
| 1995 | Deo Narayan Yadav | Janata Dal |
| 2000 | Deo Narayan Yadav | Rashtriya Janata Dal |
| 2003^ | Uma Kant Yadav | Rashtriya Janata Dal |
| 2005 | Uma Kant Yadav | Rashtriya Janata Dal |
| 2005 | Kapil Deo Kamat | Janata Dal (United) |
| 2010 | Uma Kant Yadav | Rashtriya Janata Dal |
| 2015 | Kapil Deo Kamat | Janata Dal (United) |
| 2020 | Mina Kumari | Janata Dal (United) |
| 2025 | Mina Kumari | Janata Dal (United) |

== Election results ==
=== 2025 ===
2025 Bihar Legislative Assembly election: Babubarhi
| Party | Candidate | Votes | % | ±% |
|---|---|---|---|---|
| JD(U) | Mina Kumari | 98,221 | 47.61 | +7.22 |
| RJD | Arun Kumar Singh | 80,653 | 39.09 | +4.7 |
| JSP | Alok Kumar Yadav | 7,740 | 3.75 | |
| Independent | Umesh Kumar Yadav | 5,547 | 2.69 | |
| Janshakti Janta Dal | Shanti Devi | 2,556 | 1.24 | |
| Independent | Amir Kumar Mahto | 2,327 | 1.13 | |
| NOTA | None of the above | 5,248 | 2.54 | −0.06 |
| Majority | | 17,568 | 8.52 | +2.52 |
| Turnout | | 206,322 | 66.97 | +6.02 |
| JD(U) hold | | Swing | | |

=== 2020 ===
2020 Bihar Legislative Assembly election: Babubarhi
| Party | Candidate | Votes | % | ±% |
|---|---|---|---|---|
| JD(U) | Mina Kumari | 77,367 | 40.39 | +2.72 |
| RJD | Umakant Yadav | 65,879 | 34.39 | |
| RLSP | Mahendra Prasad Singh | 11,759 | 6.14 | |
| LJP | Amar Nath Prasad | 9,818 | 5.13 | −20.12 |
| Voters Party International | Shiv Nandan Mandal | 3,653 | 1.91 | |
| Independent | Maha Narayan Roy | 3,492 | 1.82 | |
| The Plurals Party | Shalini Kumari | 3,413 | 1.78 | |
| SAP | Manoj Jha | 2,941 | 1.54 | |
| Bhartiya Rashtriya Dal | Vishwanath Roy | 2,242 | 1.17 | |
| Jago Hindustan Party | Vidya Sagar Mandal | 1,954 | 1.02 | |
| NOTA | None of the above | 4,988 | 2.6 | −2.38 |
| Majority | | 11,488 | 6.0 | −6.42 |
| Turnout | | 191,559 | 60.95 | +3.2 |
| JD(U) hold | | Swing | | |

=== 2015 ===
2015 Bihar Legislative Assembly election: Babubarhi
| Party | Candidate | Votes | % | ±% |
|---|---|---|---|---|
| JD(U) | Kapil Deo Kamat | 61,486 | 37.67 | |
| LJP | Binod Kumar Singh | 41,219 | 25.25 | |
| SP | Uma Kant Yadav | 27,153 | 16.63 | |
| Independent | Shiv Sundar Kamat | 3,920 | 2.4 | |
| CPI | Surya Narayan Mahto | 3,635 | 2.23 | |
| Independent | Vishwanath Roy | 3,404 | 2.09 | |
| Independent | Vijay Kumar Singh | 3,332 | 2.04 | |
| Independent | Dilip Kumar Sharma | 3,328 | 2.04 | |
| BSP | Rita Devi | 2,105 | 1.29 | |
| Akhil Bhartiya Mithila Party | S.N. Jha | 1,591 | 0.97 | |
| NOTA | None of the above | 8,134 | 4.98 | |
| Majority | | 20,267 | 12.42 | |
| Turnout | | 163,234 | 57.75 | |
