= Bihar Legislative Assembly =

Lower house of the bicameral legislature of the Indian state of Bihar

- 18th Bihar Assembly

Type
- Type: Lower house of the Bihar Legislature
- Term limits: 5 years

History
- Founded: 20 April 1952 (74 years ago)

Leadership
- Governor: Syed Ata Hasnain since 14 March 2026
- Speaker: Prem Kumar, BJP since 2 December 2025
- Deputy Speaker: Narendra Narayan Yadav, JD(U) since 3 December 2025
- Leader of the House (Chief Minister): Samrat Choudhary, BJP since 15 April 2026
- Deputy Leader of the House (Deputy Chief Ministers): Vijay Kumar Chaudhary; Bijendra Prasad Yadav, JD(U) since 15 April 2026
- Leader of the Opposition: Tejashwi Yadav, RJD since 17 November 2025

Structure
- Seats: 243
- Political groups: Government (200) NDA (200): BJP (88); JD(U) (84); LJP(RV) (19); HAM(S) (5); RLM (4); Opposition (43) MGB(35): RJD (25); INC (6); CPI(ML)L (2); IIP (1); CPI(M) (1); Others(8): AIMIM (5); JSP (1); BSP (1); IND (1) (Note: 178-Mokama MLA Anant Kumar Singh was expelled from JD(U) on 25 October 2026.)

Elections
- Voting system: First-past-the-post
- Last election: 6–11 November 2025
- Next election: October–November 2030

Meeting place
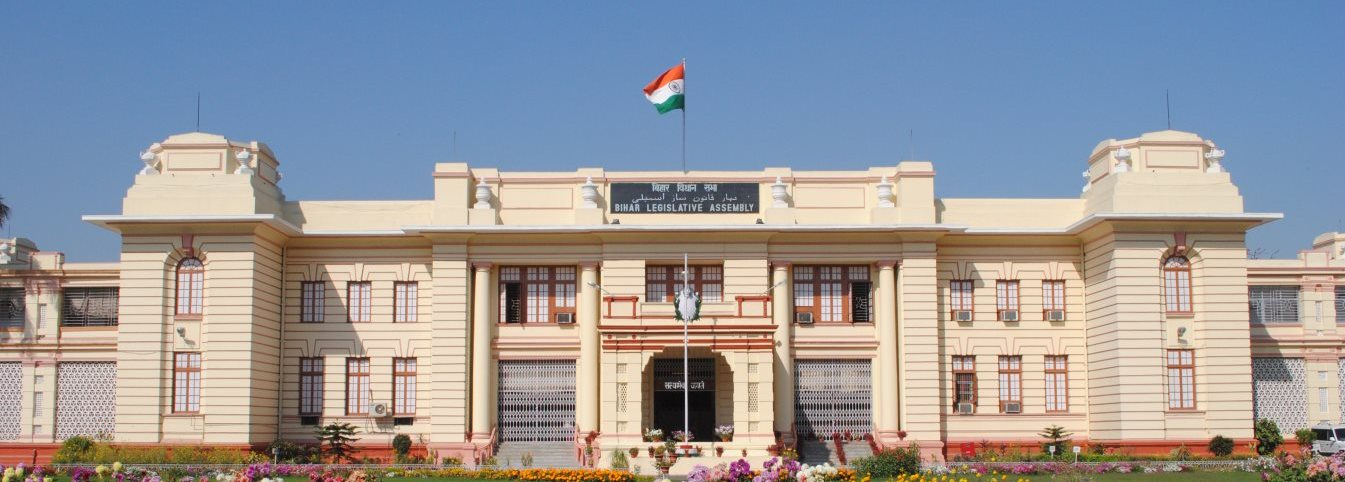
- Bihar State Assembly, Patna, Bihar, India

Website
- Bihar Legislative Assembly

The Bihar Legislative Assembly (ISO: Bihār Vidhān Sabhā) is the lower house of the bicameral Bihar Legislature of the state of Bihar in India. The first state elections were held in 1952.

Before the partition of Bihar, the total strength of membership in the assembly was 331, including one nominated member. After the partition, the seats were reduced to 243 members. Shri Krishna Singh became the first leader of the House and the first chief minister, Anugrah Narayan Singh was elected as the first deputy leader of the house and the first deputy chief minister.

== Office bearers ==
| S.No | Position | Portrait | Name | Party | Constituency | Office Taken | Ref |
|---|---|---|---|---|---|---|---|
| 1 | Speaker | | Prem Kumar | BJP | Gaya Town | 2 December 2025 | |
| 2 | Deputy Speaker | | Narendra Narayan Yadav | JD(U) | Alamnagar | 3 December 2025 | |
| 3 | Leader of the House (Chief Minister) | | Samrat Choudhary | BJP | Tarapur | 15 April 2026 | |
| 4 | Deputy Leader of the House (Deputy Chief Ministers) | | Vijay Kumar Chaudhary | JD(U) | Sarairanjan | 15 April 2026 | |
| 5 | Deputy Leader of the House (Deputy Chief Ministers) | | Bijendra Prasad Yadav | JD(U) | Supaul | 15 April 2026 | |
| 6 | Chief Whip | | Sanjiv Chaurasiya | BJP | Digha | 15 May 2026 | |
| 7 | Deputy Chief Whip | | Manjeet Kumar Singh | JD(U) | Barauli | 15 May 2026 | |

== History ==
After the passing of the Government of India Act 1935, Bihar and Orissa became separate states. A bicameral system of legislature was introduced according to the act. On 22 July 1936, the first Bihar legislative council was set up. It had 30 members and Rajiv Ranjan Prasad was the chairman. The first joint session of the two houses of the Bihar Assembly took place on 22 July 1937. Ram Dayalu Singh was elected as the speaker of the Bihar Assembly.

== Bihar Legislative Assembly terms ==
Following are the dates of constitution and dissolution of the Bihar Legislative Assembly. First sitting date and date of completion of term for each Vidhan Sabha can be different from the constitution and dissolution dates (respectively).

| Vidhan Sabha | Constitution | Dissolution | Days | Speaker | Ministry |
|---|---|---|---|---|---|
| Interim Government | 25 April 1946 | 19 May 1952 | 2,041 | Bindeshwari Prasad Verma | First Shri Krishna Sinha ministry |
| 1st | 20 May 1952 | 31 March 1957 | 1,776 | Bindeshwari Prasad Verma | Second Shri Krishna Sinha ministry |
| 2nd | 20 May 1957 | 15 March 1962 | 1,760 | Bindeshwari Prasad Verma | Third Shri Krishna Sinha ministry (Till 1961); Deep Narayan Singh interim ministry (17 days); First Binodanand Jha ministry (1961–62) |
| 3rd | 16 March 1962 | 16 March 1967 | 1,826 | Laxmi Narayan Sudhanshu | |
| 4th | 17 March 1967 | 26 February 1969 | 712 | Dhaniklal Mandal | |
| 5th | 26 February 1969 | 28 March 1972 | 1,126 | Ram Narayan Mandal | |
| 6th | 29 March 1972 | 30 April 1977 | 1,858 | Hari Nath Mishr | |
| 7th | 24 June 1977 | 17 February 1980 | 968 | Tripurari Prasad Singh | |
| 8th | 8 June 1980 | 12 March 1985 | 1,738 | Radhanandan Jha | |
| 9th | 12 March 1985 | 10 March 1990 | 1,824 | Shiva Chandra Jha (till 1989) Md Hidayatullah Khan | |
| 10th | 10 March 1990 | 28 March 1995 | 1,844 | Ghulam Sarwar | |
| 11th | 4 April 1995 | 2 March 2000 | 1,795 | Devnarayan Yadav | |
| 12th | 3 March 2000 | 6 March 2005 | 1,830 | Sadanand Singh | |
| 13th | 7 March 2005 | 24 November 2005 | 263 | Uday Narayan Chaudhary | |
| 14th | 24 November 2005 | 26 November 2010 | 1,829 | Uday Narayan Chaudhary | Second Nitish Kumar ministry |
| 15th | 26 November 2010 | 20 November 2015 | 1,821 | Uday Narayan Chaudhary | Third Nitish Kumar ministry (2010–14); Jitan Ram Manjhi ministry (2014–15); Fourth Nitish Kumar ministry (2015-15) |
| 16th | 20 November 2015 | 14 November 2020 | 1,821 | Vijay Kumar Chaudhary | Fifth Nitish Kumar ministry (2015–17); Sixth Nitish Kumar ministry (2017-20) |
| 17th | 16 November 2020 | 17 November 2025 | 1,827 | Vijay Kumar Sinha (till 9 August 2022) Awadh Bihari Choudhary (till 28 January 2024) Nand Kishore Yadav (from 15 February 2024) | Seventh Nitish Kumar ministry (2020–22); Eighth Nitish Kumar ministry (2022-2024); Ninth Nitish Kumar ministry (2024-2025) |
| 18th | 20 November 2025 | Incumbent | 345 | Prem Kumar | Tenth Nitish Kumar ministry (2025–2026); Choudhary ministry (2026-present) |

== Working ==
The Bihar Legislative Assembly is not a permanent body and is subject to dissolution. The tenure of the legislative assembly is five years from the date appointed for its first sitting unless dissolved sooner. Members of the legislative assembly are directly elected by the people.

There are three sessions every year: budget session, monsoon session, and winter session.

The sessions of the legislative assembly are presided over by the speaker. The speaker certifies whether a bill is ordinary bill or money bill. Generally, the speaker does not participate in voting, except in the case of a tie. Prem Kumar is the current speaker of the Bihar Legislative Assembly. The legislative assembly also has a Secretariat. The secretary is under the disciplinary control of the speaker. The function of the secretary is to assist the speaker. Bateshwar Nath Pandey is the current secretary of the Bihar Legislative Assembly.

== Composition ==
| Alliance | Political party | No. of MLAs | Leader of the party |
|---|---|---|---|
| Government; NDA; Seats: 200 | Bharatiya Janata Party | 88 | Samrat Choudhary (Chief Minister) |
| Government; NDA; Seats: 200 | Janata Dal (United) | 84 | Shrawan Kumar |
| Government; NDA; Seats: 200 | Lok Janshakti Party (Ram Vilas) | 19 | Raju Tiwari |
| Government; NDA; Seats: 200 | Hindustani Awam Morcha (Secular) | 5 | Prafull Kumar Singh |
| Government; NDA; Seats: 200 | Rashtriya Lok Morcha | 4 | Madhav Anand |
| Opposition; MGB; Seats: 35 | Rashtriya Janata Dal | 25 | Tejashwi Yadav (Leader of the Opposition) |
| Opposition; MGB; Seats: 35 | Indian National Congress | 6 | |
| Opposition; MGB; Seats: 35 | Communist Party of India (Marxist–Leninist) Liberation | 2 | |
| Opposition; MGB; Seats: 35 | Indian Inclusive Party | 1 | Indrajeet Prasad Gupta |
| Opposition; MGB; Seats: 35 | Communist Party of India (Marxist) | 1 | Ajay Kumar |
| Others; Seats: 8 | All India Majlis-e-Ittehadul Muslimeen | 5 | Akhtarul Iman |
| Others; Seats: 8 | Bahujan Samaj Party | 1 | Satish Kumar Yadav |
| Others; Seats: 8 | Jan Suraaj Party | 1 | Prashant Kishor |
| Others; Seats: 8 | Independent | 1 | Anant Kumar Singh (Note: 178-Mokama MLA Anant Kumar Singh was expelled from JD(U) on 25 October 2026.) |
| Total | | 243 | |

== Members of Legislative Assembly ==
Full list of elected candidates

| District | No. | Constituency | Name | Party | Alliance | Remarks |
|---|---|---|---|---|---|---|
| West Champaran | 1 | Valmiki Nagar | Surendra Prasad Kushwaha | INC | MGB | |
| West Champaran | 2 | Ramnagar (SC) | Nand Kishor Ram | BJP | NDA | |
| West Champaran | 3 | Narkatiaganj | Sanjay Kumar Pandey | BJP | NDA | |
| West Champaran | 4 | Bagaha | Ram Singh | BJP | NDA | |
| West Champaran | 5 | Lauriya | Vinay Bihari | BJP | NDA | |
| West Champaran | 6 | Nautan | Narayan Prasad | BJP | NDA | Minister |
| West Champaran | 7 | Chanpatia | Abhishek Ranjan | INC | MGB | |
| West Champaran | 8 | Bettiah | Renu Devi | BJP | NDA | |
| West Champaran | 9 | Sikta | Sammridh Varma | JD(U) | NDA | |
| East Champaran | 10 | Raxaul | Pramod Kumar Sinha | BJP | NDA | |
| East Champaran | 11 | Sugauli | Rajesh Kumar | LJP(RV) | NDA | |
| East Champaran | 12 | Narkatiya | Vishal Kumar | JD(U) | NDA | |
| East Champaran | 13 | Harsidhi (SC) | Krishnanandan Paswan | BJP | NDA | |
| East Champaran | 14 | Govindganj | Raju Tiwari | LJP(RV) | NDA | |
| East Champaran | 15 | Kesaria | Shalini Mishra | JD(U) | NDA | |
| East Champaran | 16 | Kalyanpur | Sachindra Prasad Singh | BJP | NDA | |
| East Champaran | 17 | Pipra | Shyambabu Prasad Yadav | BJP | NDA | |
| East Champaran | 18 | Madhuban | Rana Randhir Singh | BJP | NDA | |
| East Champaran | 19 | Motihari | Pramod Kumar | BJP | NDA | Minister |
| East Champaran | 20 | Chiraia | Lal Babu Prasad Gupta | BJP | NDA | |
| East Champaran | 21 | Dhaka | Faisal Rahman | RJD | MGB | |
| Sheohar | 22 | Sheohar | Shweta Gupta | JD(U) | NDA | |
| Sitamarhi | 23 | Riga | Baidyanath Prasad | BJP | NDA | |
| Sitamarhi | 24 | Bathnaha (SC) | Anil Kumar | BJP | NDA | |
| Sitamarhi | 25 | Parihar | Gayatri Devi Yadav | BJP | NDA | |
| Sitamarhi | 26 | Sursand | Nagendra Raut | JD(U) | NDA | |
| Sitamarhi | 27 | Bajpatti | Rameshwar Mahto | RLM | NDA | |
| Sitamarhi | 28 | Sitamarhi | Sunil Kumar Pintu | BJP | NDA | |
| Sitamarhi | 29 | Runnisaidpur | Pankaj Kumar Mishra | JD(U) | NDA | |
| Sitamarhi | 30 | Belsand | Amit Kumar | LJP(RV) | NDA | |
| Madhubani | 31 | Harlakhi | Sudhanshu Shekhar | JD(U) | NDA | |
| Madhubani | 32 | Benipatti | Vinod Narayan Jha | BJP | NDA | |
| Madhubani | 33 | Khajauli | Arun Shankar Prasad | BJP | NDA | Minister |
| Madhubani | 34 | Babubarhi | Mina Kumari | JD(U) | NDA | |
| Madhubani | 35 | Bisfi | Asif Ahmad | RJD | MGB | |
| Madhubani | 36 | Madhubani | Madhav Anand | RLM | NDA | |
| Madhubani | 37 | Rajnagar (SC) | Sujit Paswan | BJP | NDA | |
| Madhubani | 38 | Jhanjharpur | Nitish Mishra | BJP | NDA | |
| Madhubani | 39 | Phulparas | Sheela Kumari Mandal | JD(U) | NDA | |
| Madhubani | 40 | Laukaha | Satish Kumar Sah | JD(U) | NDA | |
| Supaul | 41 | Nirmali | Aniruddha Prasad Yadav | JD(U) | NDA | |
| Supaul | 42 | Pipra | Rambilash Kamat | JD(U) | NDA | |
| Supaul | 43 | Supaul | Bijendra Prasad Yadav | JD(U) | NDA | Deputy Chief Minister (Since 15 April 2026) |
| Supaul | 44 | Triveniganj (SC) | Sonam Rani Sardar | JD(U) | NDA | |
| Supaul | 45 | Chhatapur | Neeraj Kumar Singh | BJP | NDA | |
| Araria | 46 | Narpatganj | Devanti Yadav | BJP | NDA | |
| Araria | 47 | Raniganj (SC) | Avinash Mangalam | RJD | MGB | |
| Araria | 48 | Forbesganj | Manoj Bishwas | INC | MGB | |
| Araria | 49 | Araria | Avidur Rahman | INC | MGB | |
| Araria | 50 | Jokihat | Mohammad Murshid Alam | AIMIM | None | |
| Araria | 51 | Sikti | Vijay Kumar Mandal | BJP | NDA | |
| Kishanganj | 52 | Bahadurganj | Mohammad Tauseef Alam | AIMIM | None | |
| Kishanganj | 53 | Thakurganj | Gopal Kumar Agarwal | JD(U) | NDA | |
| Kishanganj | 54 | Kishanganj | Qamrul Hoda | INC | MGB | |
| Kishanganj | 55 | Kochadhaman | Sarwar Alam | AIMIM | None | |
| Purnia | 56 | Amour | Akhtarul Iman | AIMIM | None | |
| Purnia | 57 | Baisi | Ghulam Sarwar | AIMIM | None | |
| Purnia | 58 | Kasba | Nitesh Kumar Singh | LJP(RV) | NDA | |
| Purnia | 59 | Banmankhi (SC) | Krishna Kumar Rishi | BJP | NDA | |
| Purnia | 60 | Rupauli | Kaladhar Mandal | JD(U) | NDA | |
| Purnia | 61 | Dhamdaha | Leshi Singh | JD(U) | NDA | |
| Purnia | 62 | Purnia | Vijay Kumar Khemka | BJP | NDA | |
| Katihar | 63 | Katihar | Tarkishore Prasad | BJP | NDA | |
| Katihar | 64 | Kadwa | Dulal Chandra Goswami | JD(U) | NDA | |
| Katihar | 65 | Balrampur | Sangita Devi | LJP(RV) | NDA | |
| Katihar | 66 | Pranpur | Nisha Singh | BJP | NDA | |
| Katihar | 67 | Manihari (ST) | Manohar Prasad Singh | INC | MGB | |
| Katihar | 68 | Barari | Bijay Singh | JD(U) | NDA | |
| Katihar | 69 | Korha (SC) | Kavita Devi | BJP | NDA | |
| Madhepura | 70 | Alamnagar | Narendra Narayan Yadav | JD(U) | NDA | Deputy Speaker |
| Madhepura | 71 | Bihariganj | Niranjan Kumar Mehta | JD(U) | NDA | |
| Madhepura | 72 | Singheshwar (SC) | Ramesh Rishidev | JD(U) | NDA | |
| Madhepura | 73 | Madhepura | Chandrashekhar Yadav | RJD | MGB | |
| Saharsa | 74 | Sonbarsha (SC) | Ratnesh Sada | JD(U) | NDA | |
| Saharsa | 75 | Saharsa | Indrajeet Prasad Gupta | IIP | MGB | |
| Saharsa | 76 | Simri Bakhtiarpur | Sanjay Kumar Singh | LJP(RV) | NDA | |
| Saharsa | 77 | Mahishi | Gautam Krishna | RJD | MGB | |
| Darbhanga | 78 | Kusheshwar Asthan (SC) | Atirek Kumar | JD(U) | NDA | |
| Darbhanga | 79 | Gaura Bauram | Sujit Kumar | BJP | NDA | |
| Darbhanga | 80 | Benipur | Binay Kumar Choudhary | JD(U) | NDA | |
| Darbhanga | 81 | Alinagar | Maithili Thakur | BJP | NDA | |
| Darbhanga | 82 | Darbhanga Rural | Rajesh Kumar Mandal | JD(U) | NDA | |
| Darbhanga | 83 | Darbhanga | Sanjay Saraogi | BJP | NDA | |
| Darbhanga | 84 | Hayaghat | Ram Chandra Prasad | BJP | NDA | |
| Darbhanga | 85 | Bahadurpur | Madan Sahni | JD(U) | NDA | |
| Darbhanga | 86 | Keoti | Murari Mohan Jha | BJP | NDA | |
| Darbhanga | 87 | Jale | Jibesh Kumar | BJP | NDA | |
| Muzaffarpur | 88 | Gaighat | Komal Singh | JD(U) | NDA | |
| Muzaffarpur | 89 | Aurai | Rama Nishad | BJP | NDA | Minister |
| Muzaffarpur | 90 | Minapur | Ajay Kushwaha | JD(U) | NDA | |
| Muzaffarpur | 91 | Bochahan (SC) | Baby Kumari | LJP(RV) | NDA | |
| Muzaffarpur | 92 | Sakra (SC) | Aditya Kumar | JD(U) | NDA | |
| Muzaffarpur | 93 | Kurhani | Kedar Prasad Gupta | BJP | NDA | |
| Muzaffarpur | 94 | Muzaffarpur | Ranjan Kumar | BJP | NDA | |
| Muzaffarpur | 95 | Kanti | Ajit Singh | JD(U) | NDA | |
| Muzaffarpur | 96 | Baruraj | Arun Kumar Singh | BJP | NDA | |
| Muzaffarpur | 97 | Paroo | Shankar Prasad Yadav | RJD | MGB | |
| Muzaffarpur | 98 | Sahebganj | Raju Kumar Singh | BJP | NDA | |
| Gopalganj | 99 | Baikunthpur | Mithlesh Tiwari | BJP | NDA | |
| Gopalganj | 100 | Barauli | Manjeet Kumar Singh | JD(U) | NDA | |
| Gopalganj | 101 | Gopalganj | Subhash Singh | BJP | NDA | |
| Gopalganj | 102 | Kuchaikote | Amrendra Kumar Pandey | JD(U) | NDA | |
| Gopalganj | 103 | Bhore (SC) | Sunil Kumar | JD(U) | NDA | |
| Gopalganj | 104 | Hathua | Ramsewak Singh Kushwaha | JD(U) | NDA | |
| Siwan | 105 | Siwan | Mangal Pandey | BJP | NDA | Minister |
| Siwan | 106 | Ziradei | Bhism Pratap Singh Kushwaha | JD(U) | NDA | |
| Siwan | 107 | Darauli (SC) | Vishnu Deo Paswan | LJP(RV) | NDA | |
| Siwan | 108 | Raghunathpur | Osama Shahab | RJD | MGB | |
| Siwan | 109 | Daraunda | Karanjeet Singh | BJP | NDA | |
| Siwan | 110 | Barharia | Indradev Patel | JD(U) | NDA | |
| Siwan | 111 | Goriakothi | Devesh Kant Singh | BJP | NDA | |
| Siwan | 112 | Maharajganj | Hemnarayan Sah | JD(U) | NDA | |
| Saran | 113 | Ekma | Manoranjan Singh Dhumal | JD(U) | NDA | |
| Saran | 114 | Manjhi | Randhir Kumar Singh | JD(U) | NDA | |
| Saran | 115 | Baniapur | Kedar Nath Singh | BJP | NDA | |
| Saran | 116 | Taraiya | Janak Singh | BJP | NDA | |
| Saran | 117 | Marhaura | Jitendra Kumar Ray | RJD | MGB | |
| Saran | 118 | Chapra | Chhoti Kumari | BJP | NDA | |
| Saran | 119 | Garkha (SC) | Surendra Ram | RJD | MGB | |
| Saran | 120 | Amnour | Krishan Kumar Mantoo | BJP | NDA | |
| Saran | 121 | Parsa | Karishma Rai | RJD | MGB | |
| Saran | 122 | Sonpur | Vinay Kumar Singh | BJP | NDA | |
| Vaishali | 123 | Hajipur | Awadhesh Singh | BJP | NDA | |
| Vaishali | 124 | Lalganj | Sanjay Kumar Singh | BJP | NDA | |
| Vaishali | 125 | Vaishali | Siddharth Patel | JD(U) | NDA | |
| Vaishali | 126 | Mahua | Sanjay Kumar Singh | LJP(RV) | NDA | Minister |
| Vaishali | 127 | Raja Pakar (SC) | Mahendra Ram | JD(U) | NDA | |
| Vaishali | 128 | Raghopur | Tejashwi Yadav | RJD | MGB | |
| Vaishali | 129 | Mahnar | Umesh Singh Kushwaha | JD(U) | NDA | |
| Vaishali | 130 | Patepur (SC) | Lakhendra Kumar Raushan | BJP | NDA | Minister |
| Samastipur | 131 | Kalyanpur | Maheshwar Hazari | JD(U) | NDA | |
| Samastipur | 132 | Warisnagar | Manjarik Mrinal | JD(U) | NDA | |
| Samastipur | 133 | Samastipur | Ashwamedh Devi | JD(U) | NDA | |
| Samastipur | 134 | Ujiarpur | Alok Kumar Mehta | RJD | MGB | |
| Samastipur | 135 | Morwa | Ranvijay Sahu | RJD | MGB | |
| Samastipur | 136 | Sarairanjan | Vijay Kumar Chaudhary | JD(U) | NDA | Deputy Chief Minister (Since 15 April 2026) |
| Samastipur | 137 | Mohiuddinnagar | Rajesh Kumar Singh | BJP | NDA | |
| Samastipur | 138 | Bibhutipur | Ajay Kumar Kushwaha | CPI(M) | MGB | |
| Samastipur | 139 | Rosera (SC) | Birendra Kumar | BJP | NDA | |
| Samastipur | 140 | Hasanpur | Raj Kumar Ray | JD(U) | NDA | |
| Begusarai | 141 | Cheria-Bariarpur | Sushil Kumar | JD(U) | NDA | |
| Begusarai | 142 | Bachhwara | Surendra Mehata | BJP | NDA | Minister |
| Begusarai | 143 | Teghra | Rajnish Kumar Singh | BJP | NDA | |
| Begusarai | 144 | Matihani | Narendra Kumar Singh | RJD | MGB | |
| Begusarai | 145 | Sahebpur Kamal | Sadanand Yadav | RJD | MGB | |
| Begusarai | 146 | Begusarai | Kundan Kumar | BJP | NDA | |
| Begusarai | 147 | Bakhri (SC) | Sanjay Paswan | LJP(RV) | NDA | |
| Khagaria | 148 | Alauli (SC) | Ram Chandra Sada | JD(U) | NDA | |
| Khagaria | 149 | Khagaria | Bablu Mandal | JD(U) | NDA | |
| Khagaria | 150 | Beldaur | Panna Lal Singh Patel | JD(U) | NDA | |
| Khagaria | 151 | Parbatta | Aditya Kumar Shorya | LJP(RV) | NDA | |
| Bhagalpur | 152 | Bihpur | Kumar Shailendra | BJP | NDA | |
| Bhagalpur | 153 | Gopalpur | Shailesh Kumar Mandal | JD(U) | NDA | |
| Bhagalpur | 154 | Pirpainti (SC) | Murari Paswan | BJP | NDA | |
| Bhagalpur | 155 | Kahalgaon | Shubhanand Mukesh | JD(U) | NDA | |
| Bhagalpur | 156 | Bhagalpur | Rohit Pandey | BJP | NDA | |
| Bhagalpur | 157 | Sultanganj | Lalit Narayan Mandal | JD(U) | NDA | |
| Bhagalpur | 158 | Nathnagar | Mithun Yadav | LJP(RV) | NDA | |
| Banka | 159 | Amarpur | Jayant Raj Kushwaha | JD(U) | NDA | |
| Banka | 160 | Dhoraiya (SC) | Manish Kumar | JD(U) | NDA | |
| Banka | 161 | Banka | Ramnarayan Mandal | BJP | NDA | |
| Banka | 162 | Katoria (ST) | Puran Lal Tudu | BJP | NDA | |
| Banka | 163 | Belhar | Manoj Yadav | JD(U) | NDA | |
| Munger | 164 | Tarapur | Samrat Choudhary | BJP | NDA | Chief Minister |
| Munger | 165 | Munger | Kumar Pranay | BJP | NDA | |
| Munger | 166 | Jamalpur | Nachiketa Mandal | JD(U) | NDA | |
| Lakhisarai | 167 | Suryagarha | Ramanand Mandal | JD(U) | NDA | |
| Lakhisarai | 168 | Lakhisarai | Vijay Kumar Sinha | BJP | NDA | Deputy Chief Minister (Till 14 April 2026) |
| Sheikhpura | 169 | Sheikhpura | Randhir Kumar Soni | JD(U) | NDA | |
| Sheikhpura | 170 | Barbigha | Kumar Puspanjay | JD(U) | NDA | |
| Nalanda | 171 | Asthawan | Jitendra Kumar | JD(U) | NDA | |
| Nalanda | 172 | Biharsharif | Sunil Kumar | BJP | NDA | |
| Nalanda | 173 | Rajgir (SC) | Kaushal Kishore | JD(U) | NDA | |
| Nalanda | 174 | Islampur | Ruhail Ranjan | JD(U) | NDA | |
| Nalanda | 175 | Hilsa | Krishna Murari Sharan | JD(U) | NDA | |
| Nalanda | 176 | Nalanda | Shrawan Kumar | JD(U) | NDA | Minister |
| Nalanda | 177 | Harnaut | Hari Narayan Singh | JD(U) | NDA | |
| Patna | 178 | Mokama | Anant Kumar Singh | IND | None | Expelled from JD(U) on 25 October 2026. |
| Patna | 179 | Barh | Siyaram Singh | BJP | NDA | |
| Patna | 180 | Bakhtiarpur | Arun Kumar | LJP(RV) | NDA | |
| Patna | 181 | Digha | Sanjiv Chaurasiya | BJP | NDA | |
| Patna | 182 | Bankipur | Nitin Nabin | BJP | NDA | Resigned on 30 March 2026 |
| Patna | 182 | Bankipur | Prashant Kishor | JSP | None | Elected on 3 August 2026 |
| Patna | 183 | Kumhrar | Sanjay Kumar | BJP | NDA | |
| Patna | 184 | Patna Sahib | Ratnesh Kumar Kushwaha | BJP | NDA | |
| Patna | 185 | Fatuha | Rama Nand Yadav | RJD | MGB | |
| Patna | 186 | Danapur | Ram Kripal Yadav | BJP | NDA | Minister |
| Patna | 187 | Maner | Virendra Yadav | RJD | MGB | |
| Patna | 188 | Phulwari (SC) | Shyam Rajak | JD(U) | NDA | |
| Patna | 189 | Masaurhi (SC) | Arun Manjhi | JD(U) | NDA | |
| Patna | 190 | Paliganj | Sandeep Yadav | CPI(ML)L | MGB | |
| Patna | 191 | Bikram | Siddharth Saurav | BJP | NDA | |
| Bhojpur | 192 | Sandesh | Radha Charan Sah | JD(U) | NDA | |
| Bhojpur | 193 | Barhara | Raghvendra Pratap Singh | BJP | NDA | |
| Bhojpur | 194 | Arrah | Sanjay Singh Tiger | BJP | NDA | Minister |
| Bhojpur | 195 | Agiaon (SC) | Mahesh Paswan | BJP | NDA | |
| Bhojpur | 196 | Tarari | Vishal Prashant | BJP | NDA | |
| Bhojpur | 197 | Jagdishpur | Bhagwan Singh Kushwaha | JD(U) | NDA | |
| Bhojpur | 198 | Shahpur | Rakesh Ojha | BJP | NDA | |
| Buxar | 199 | Brahampur | Shambhu Nath Yadav | RJD | MGB | |
| Buxar | 200 | Buxar | Anand Mishra | BJP | NDA | |
| Buxar | 201 | Dumraon | Rahul Kumar Singh | JD(U) | NDA | |
| Buxar | 202 | Rajpur (SC) | Santosh Kumar Nirala | JD(U) | NDA | |
| Kaimur | 203 | Ramgarh | Satish Kumar Singh Yadav | BSP | None | |
| Kaimur | 204 | Mohania (SC) | Sangita Kumari | BJP | NDA | |
| Kaimur | 205 | Bhabua | Bharat Bind | BJP | NDA | |
| Kaimur | 206 | Chainpur | Mohammad Zama Khan | JD(U) | NDA | |
| Rohtas | 207 | Chenari (SC) | Murari Prasad Gautam | LJP(RV) | NDA | |
| Rohtas | 208 | Sasaram | Snehlata Kushwaha | RLM | NDA | |
| Rohtas | 209 | Kargahar | Bashisth Singh | JD(U) | NDA | |
| Rohtas | 210 | Dinara | Alok Kumar Singh | RLM | NDA | |
| Rohtas | 211 | Nokha | Nagendra Chandravanshi | JD(U) | NDA | |
| Rohtas | 212 | Dehri | Rajeev Ranjan Singh | LJP(RV) | NDA | |
| Rohtas | 213 | Karakat | Arun Singh Kushwaha | CPI(ML)L | MGB | |
| Arwal | 214 | Arwal | Manoj Kumar | BJP | NDA | |
| Arwal | 215 | Kurtha | Pappu Verma | JD(U) | NDA | |
| Jehanabad | 216 | Jehanabad | Rahul Sharma | RJD | MGB | |
| Jehanabad | 217 | Ghosi | Rituraj Kumar | JD(U) | NDA | |
| Jehanabad | 218 | Makhdumpur (SC) | Subedar Das | RJD | MGB | |
| Aurangabad | 219 | Goh | Amrender Kushwaha | RJD | MGB | |
| Aurangabad | 220 | Obra | Prakash Chandra | LJP(RV) | NDA | |
| Aurangabad | 221 | Nabinagar | Chetan Anand | JD(U) | NDA | |
| Aurangabad | 222 | Kutumba (SC) | Lalan Ram | HAM(S) | NDA | |
| Aurangabad | 223 | Aurangabad | Trivikram Singh | BJP | NDA | |
| Aurangabad | 224 | Rafiganj | Pramod Kumar Singh | JD(U) | NDA | |
| Gaya | 225 | Gurua | Upendra Prasad | BJP | NDA | |
| Gaya | 226 | Sherghati | Uday Kumar Singh | LJP(RV) | NDA | |
| Gaya | 227 | Imamganj (SC) | Deepa Manjhi | HAM(S) | NDA | |
| Gaya | 228 | Barachatti (SC) | Jyoti Devi | HAM(S) | NDA | |
| Gaya | 229 | Bodh Gaya (SC) | Kumar Sarvjeet | RJD | MGB | |
| Gaya | 230 | Gaya Town | Prem Kumar | BJP | NDA | Speaker |
| Gaya | 231 | Tikari | Ajay Dangi | RJD | MGB | |
| Gaya | 232 | Belaganj | Manorama Devi | JD(U) | NDA | |
| Gaya | 233 | Atri | Romit Kumar | HAM(S) | NDA | |
| Gaya | 234 | Wazirganj | Birendra Singh | BJP | NDA | |
| Nawada | 235 | Rajauli (SC) | Vimala Rajvanshi | LJP(RV) | NDA | |
| Nawada | 236 | Hisua | Anil Singh | BJP | NDA | |
| Nawada | 237 | Nawada | Vibha Devi Yadav | JD(U) | NDA | |
| Nawada | 238 | Gobindpur | Binita Mehta | LJP(RV) | NDA | |
| Nawada | 239 | Warsaliganj | Anita Mahto | RJD | MGB | |
| Jamui | 240 | Sikandra (SC) | Prafull Kumar Manjhi | HAM(S) | NDA | |
| Jamui | 241 | Jamui | Shreyasi Singh | BJP | NDA | Minister |
| Jamui | 242 | Jhajha | Damodar Rawat | JD(U) | NDA | |
| Jamui | 243 | Chakai | Savitri Devi | RJD | MGB | |

== See also ==
- Bihar Economic Survey
- Bihar Legislative Council – Upper house of the bicameral legislature of the Indian state of Bihar
- Government of Bihar – Indian State Government
- List of chief ministers of Bihar
- List of constituencies of the Bihar Legislative Assembly
- List of deputy chief ministers of Bihar
- List of speakers of the Bihar Legislative Assembly
- List of governors of Bihar
- List of leaders of the opposition in the Bihar Legislative Assembly
- Patna Secretariat
