= October 2005 Bihar Legislative Assembly election =

Election in India

- 18, 26 October 2005; 13, 19 November 2005

243 seats in the Bihar Legislative Assembly
- Turnout: 45.85%
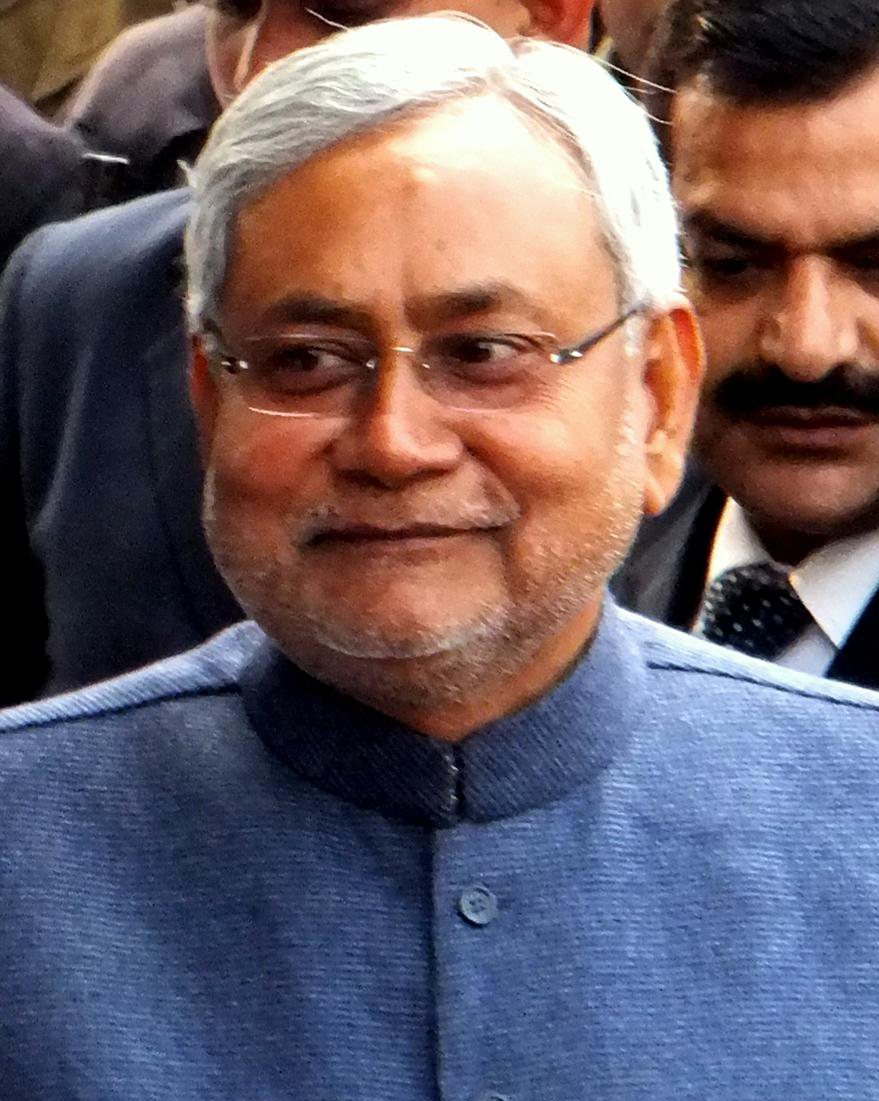

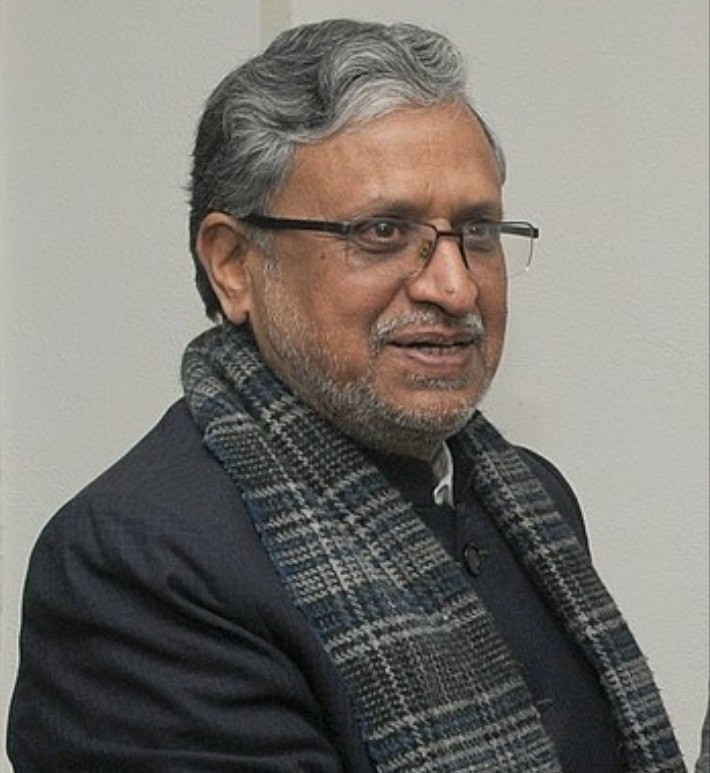

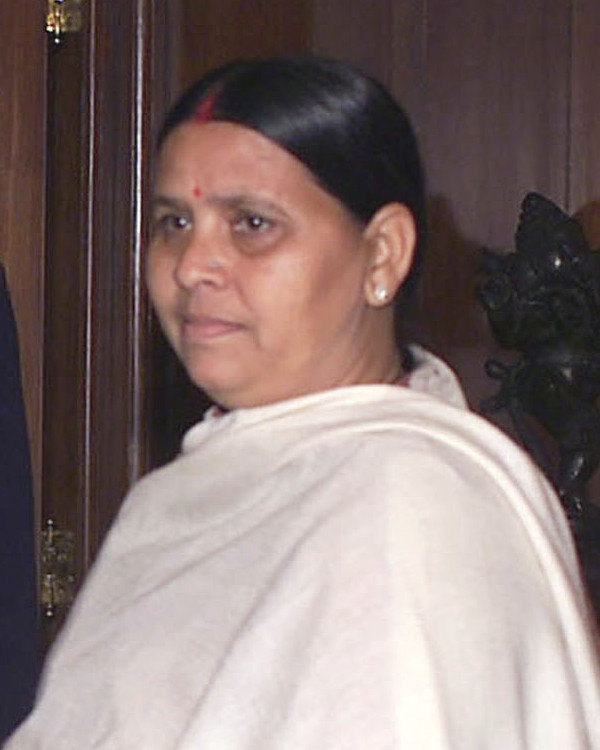

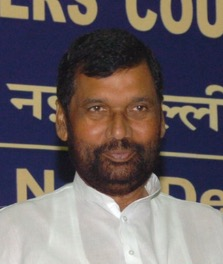
	Majority party	Minority party	Third party
Leader	Nitish Kumar	Sushil Modi	Rabri Devi
Party	JD(U)	BJP	RJD
Alliance	NDA	NDA	UPA
Leader since	2005	2005	1996
Leader's seat	MLC (didn't contested)	Did not contest	Raghopur
Last election	55	37	75
Seats won	88	55	54
Seat change	▲33	▲18	▼21
Popular vote	4,819,759	3,686,720	5,525,081
Percentage	20.46%	15.65%	23.45%
Swing	▲5.91%	▲4.68%	▼1.62%
	Fourth party	Fifth party
Leader	Ram Vilas Paswan	Sadanand Singh
Party	SP	INC
Alliance	NDA	UPA
Leader since	2000	2005
Leader's seat	Did not contest	Kahalgong (lost)
Last election	29	10
Seats won	10	9
Seat change	▼19	▼1
Popular vote	2,615,901	1,435,449
Percentage	11.1%	6.09%
Swing		▲1.09%
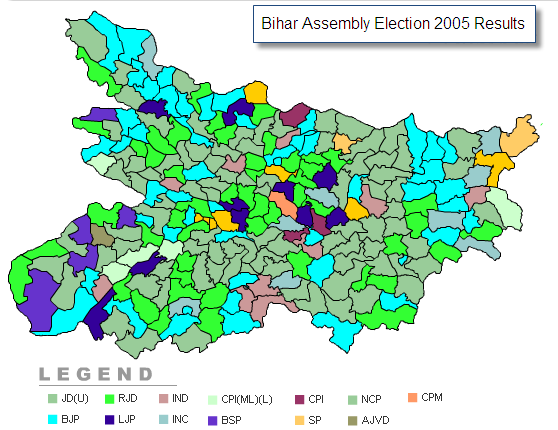
- Detailed result of 2005 election
Chief Minister before election
Rabri Devi
JD
Elected Chief Minister
Nitish Kumar
JD(U)

Bihar Assembly elections were held twice in the year 2005. There was a fractured verdict in the February 2005 Assembly Election. Since no government could be formed in Bihar, fresh elections were held in October–November the same year.

The Janata Dal (United) emerged as the majority seat winner after the Oct- Nov 2005 election, and ruled along with the Bharatiya Janata Party (2nd Highest) as part of the National Democratic Alliance. The incumbent chief minister was Nitish Kumar.

One of the oldest political parties in India, the Indian National Congress, surprisingly finished 4th and 5th in both the elections respectively.

== Schedule ==
Bihar Assembly elections were held in four phases in October 2005. A total of 2135 candidates were contested from the 243 constituencies in the Bihar Assembly elections of October 2005. Out of 2135 candidates in the October 2005 elections, male and female candidates were 1999 (93%) and 136 (7%) respectively.

Pole Event and Place	Phase-I	Phase-II	Phase-III	Phase-IV
Counting of Votes	22 November 2005	22 November 2005	22 November 2005	22 November 2005
Issue of notification	23 September 2005	28 September 2005	19 October 2005	26 October 2005
Last Date for making nominations	30 September 2005	5 October 2005	26 October 2005	2 November 2005
Scrutiny of nominations	1 October 2005	6 October 2005	27 October 2005	3 November 2005
Last Date for withdrawal of candidature	3 October 2005	8 October 2005	29 October 2005	5 November 2005
District Name	1. Patna^; 2. Kaimur; 3. Rohtas; 4. Buxar; 5. Aurangabad; 6. Gaya; 7. Arwal; 8. Jehanabad; 9. Nawada; 10. Jamui; 11. Banka	1. Bhagalpur; 2. Munger; 3. Lakhisara; 4. Sheikhpur; 5. Begusarai; 6. Khagaria; 7. Katihar; 8. Purnea; 9. Vaishali; 10. Muzaffarpur; 11. Samastipur	1. West Champaran; 2. East Champaran; 3. Sitamarhi; 4. Sheohar; 5. Darbhanga; 6. Madhubani; 7. Supaul; 8. Saharsa; 9. Madhepura; 10. Araria; 11. Kishanganj	1. Patna; 2. Nalanda; 3. Saran; 4. Siwan; 5. Gopalganj
Total No. of Assembly Constituencies	61	69	72	41
Status	Done	Done	Done	Done
^ Masaurhi, Phulwari, Bikram, Paliganj.
Total No. of Assembly Constituencies				243
Assembly Constituencies reserved for Scheduled Castes				39
No. of Electors				5.27 crores
No. of Polling Booths	Estimated 7,300 more Auxiliary Polling Stations will be added to 50,063 booths of last Assembly elections.			
Source: India Election

== Parties and Alliances ==
=== National Democratic Alliance ===
Party	Flag	Symbol	Photo	Leader	Seats contested
Janata Dal (United)				Nitish Kumar	139
Bharatiya Janata Party				Sushil Kumar Modi	102
Independent					2

=== United Progressive Alliance ===
Party	Flag	Symbol	Photo	Leader	Contesting Seats
Rashtriya Janata Dal				Rabri Devi	175
Indian National Congress				Sadanand Singh	51
Communist Party of India (Marxist)				Prakash Karat	7 + 3 (Note: Friendly Contest on Bisfi, Sugauli and Purnea between CPI(M) and RJD, INC.)
Nationalist Congress Party				Tariq Anwar	8
Independent					2

=== LJP + Left Alliance ===
Party	Flag	Symbol	Photo	Leader	Seats contested
Lok Janshakti Party				Ram Vilas Paswan	202
Communist Party of India				Ardhendu Bhushan Bardhan	34 + 1 (Note: Friendly contest on Begusarai between CPI and LJP.)
All India Forward Bloc				Debabrata Biswas	2 + 1 (Note: Friendly contest on Basantpur between AIFB and LJP.)
Independent					5

== Results ==
Party	Party Flag	Seats contested	Seats Won	Seats change	Efficiency	Vote share
Janata Dal (United)		139	88	▲33	63.30%	20.46
Bharatiya Janata Party		102	55	▲18	53.92%	15.65
Rashtriya Janata Dal		175	54	▼21	30.81%	23.45
Lok Janshakti Party		203	10	▼19	4.92%	11.10
Indian National Congress		51	9	▼1	17.64%	6.09%
Communist Party of India (Marxist–Leninist) Liberation		85	5	▼2	5.88%	2.37%
Bahujan Samaj Party		212	4	▼2		4.17%
Communist Party of India		35	3	Steady		2.09%
Samajwadi Party		158	2	▼2		2.52%
Nationalist Congress Party		8	1	▼2		0.79%
Communist Party of India (Marxist)		10	1	▼1		0.68%
Akhil Jan Vikas Dal		12	1	▲1		0.21%
Independent		766	10	▼7		8.77%
Total			243		-	100%

=== District wise results ===
District	Seats							
District	Seats	JDU	BJP	RJD	LJP	INC	IND	OTH
Araria	6	2	4	—N/a	—N/a	—N/a	—N/a	—N/a
Arwal	2	1	—N/a	—N/a	1	—N/a	—N/a	—N/a
Aurangabad	6	2	1	2	1	—N/a	—N/a	—N/a
Banka	5	2	1	2	—N/a	—N/a	—N/a	—N/a
Begusarai	7	1	1	—N/a	1	1	1	2
Bhagalpur	7	4	1	2	—N/a	—N/a	—N/a	—N/a
Bhojpur	7	3	2	1	—N/a	—N/a	—N/a	1
Buxar	4	1	—N/a	1	—N/a	—N/a	—N/a	2
Darbhanga	9	—N/a	2	6	1	—N/a	—N/a	—N/a
East Champaran	11	3	5	2	1	—N/a	—N/a	—N/a
Gaya	10	3	2	4	—N/a	1	—N/a	—N/a
Gopalganj	6	1	2	2	—N/a	—N/a	—N/a	1
Jamui	4	3	1	—N/a	—N/a	—N/a	—N/a	—N/a
Jehanabad	3	1	—N/a	2	—N/a	—N/a	—N/a	—N/a
Kaimur	4	1	—N/a	2	—N/a	—N/a	—N/a	1
Katihar	7	—N/a	2	1	—N/a	2	—N/a	2
Khagaria	4	3	—N/a	—N/a	1	—N/a	—N/a	—N/a
Kishanganj	3	—N/a	—N/a	1	—N/a	1	—N/a	1
Lakhisarai	2	—N/a	1	1	—N/a	—N/a	—N/a	—N/a
Madhepura	5	5	—N/a	—N/a	—N/a	—N/a	—N/a	—N/a
Madhubani	11	4	3	1	—N/a	—N/a	1	2
Munger	4	3	—N/a	1	—N/a	—N/a	—N/a	—N/a
Muzaffarpur	11	7	1	2	—N/a	—N/a	1	—N/a
Nalanda	9	8	1	—N/a	—N/a	—N/a	—N/a	—N/a
Nawada	5	—N/a	2	—N/a	—N/a	—N/a	3	—N/a
Patna	13	4	6	2	—N/a	—N/a	—N/a	1
Purnia	7	—N/a	3	2	—N/a	1	1	—N/a
Rohtas	7	2	2	—N/a	—N/a	—N/a	1	2
Saharsa	4	2	1	—N/a	—N/a	—N/a	1	—N/a
Samastipur	10	2	—N/a	5	1	1	—N/a	1
Saran	10	5	2	2	—N/a	—N/a	1	—N/a
Sheikhpura	1	—N/a	—N/a	—N/a	—N/a	1	—N/a	—N/a
Sheohar	1	—N/a	—N/a	1	—N/a	—N/a	—N/a	—N/a
Sitamarhi	8	2	2	3	1	—N/a	—N/a	—N/a
Siwan	8	3	2	2	—N/a	—N/a	—N/a	1
Supaul	5	5	—N/a	—N/a	—N/a	—N/a	—N/a	—N/a
Vaishali	8	2	1	3	2	—N/a	—N/a	—N/a
West Champaran	9	3	4	1	—N/a	1	—N/a	—N/a
Total	243	88	55	54	10	9	10	17

== Detailed result ==
Bihar Assembly elections were held in four phases in October 2005. A total of 2135 candidates were contested from the 243 constituencies in the Bihar Assembly elections of October 2005. Out of 2135 candidates in the October 2005 elections, male and female candidates were 1999 (93%) and 136 (7%) respectively.

The Janata Dal (United) was the largest party in the seat after the Oct- Nov 2005 election, and ruled along with the Bharatiya Janata Party as part of the National Democratic Alliance. The incumbent chief minister was Nitish Kumar.

District	Constituency		Winner				Runner Up				Margin	%
District	#	Name (Note: SC and ST indicate constituencies reserved for Scheduled Castes and Scheduled Tribes respectively.)	Candidate	Party	Votes	%	Candidate	Party	Votes	%	Margin	%
West; Champaran	1	Dhanaha	Rajesh Singh	RJD	19,164	32.29	Ramadhar Yadav	SP	17,700	29.82	1,464	2.47
West; Champaran	2	Bagha (SC)	Purnmasi Ram	JD(U)	60,794	50.70	Narsingh Baitha	INC	42,403	35.36	18,391	15.34
West; Champaran	3	Ramnagar	Chandra Mohan Rai	BJP	39,147	37.45	Fakroodin Khan	RJD	38,228	36.57	919	0.88
West; Champaran	4	Shikarpur (SC)	Bhagirathi Devi	BJP	35,147	35.74	Subodh Kumar	NCP	29,893	30.40	5,254	5.34
West; Champaran	5	Sikta	Khurshid Ahmad	INC	35,811	33.77	Dilip Verma	SP	28,212	26.60	7,599	7.17
West; Champaran	6	Lauria	Pradeep Singh	JD(U)	28,089	28.60	Shambhu Tiwari	BSP	26,065	26.54	2,024	2.06
West; Champaran	7	Chanpatia	Satish Dubey	BJP	42,960	48.36	Vishwa M. Sharma	INC	22,086	24.86	20,874	23.50
West; Champaran	8	Bettiah	Renu Devi	BJP	55,184	47.87	Md. Shamim Akthar	INC	38,718	33.59	16,466	14.28
West; Champaran	9	Nautan	Baidyanath Mahto	JD(U)	35,497	37.52	Amar Yadav	RJD	30,194	31.92	5,303	5.61
East; Champaran	10	Raxaul	Ajay Km Singh	BJP	38,448	39.71	Rajnandan Rai	LJP	29,999	30.99	8,449	8.73
East; Champaran	11	Sugauli	Ramchandra Sahani	BJP	35,869	32.41	Vijay Prasad Gupta	RJD	29,264	26.44	6,605	5.97
East; Champaran	12	Motihari	Pramod Kumar	BJP	56,119	45.31	Rama Devi	RJD	35,416	28.60	20,703	16.72
East; Champaran	13	Adapur	Shyam Bihari Prasad	JD(U)	44,714	40.58	Sabir Ali	LJP	28,706	26.05	16,008	14.53
East; Champaran	14	Dhaka	Avaneesh Kumar Singh	BJP	33,162	32.36	Bhai Pawan Jaiswal	LJP	30,472	29.74	2,690	2.63
East; Champaran	15	Ghorasahan	Laxmi Narayan Yadav	RJD	30,951	31.82	Pramod Kumar Sinha	JD(U)	30,137	30.98	814	0.84
East; Champaran	16	Madhuban	Shivjee Rai	JD(U)	47,990	47.67	Rana Randhir	RJD	28,512	28.32	19,478	19.35
East; Champaran	17	Pipra (SC)	Krishnanandan Paswan	BJP	43,239	48.61	Surendra Kr. Chandra	RJD	32,760	36.83	10,479	11.78
East; Champaran	18	Kesariya	Rajesh Kr. Raushan	RJD	31,090	35.23	Razia Khatoon	JD(U)	30,112	34.12	978	1.11
East; Champaran	19	Harsidhi	Maheshwar Singh	LJP	35,811	37.01	Awadhesh Kushwaha	JD(U)	35,703	36.90	108	0.11
East; Champaran	20	Gobindganj	Meena Dwivedi	JD(U)	35,743	40.22	Rajan Tiwari	LJP	19,722	22.19	16,021	18.03
Gopalganj	21	Kateya	Amrendra Km. Pandey	BSP	38,024	36.92	Kiran Devi	RJD	33,821	32.84	4,203	4.08
Gopalganj	22	Bhore (SC)	Anil Kumar	RJD	33,081	35.95	Indradev Manjhi	BJP	27,190	29.55	5,891	6.40
Gopalganj	23	Mirganj	Ramsewak Singh	JD(U)	30,748	33.53	Babuddin Khan	INC	23,135	25.23	7,613	8.30
Gopalganj	24	Gopalganj	Subhash Singh	BJP	39,205	36.75	Riyazul Hauqe	BSP	31,271	29.31	7,934	7.44
Gopalganj	25	Barauli	Rampravesh Rai	BJP	38,235	39.24	Md. Nemtullah	RJD	37,081	38.05	1,154	1.18
Gopalganj	26	Baikunthpur	Deo Dutt Prasad	RJD	44,291	42.37	Manjeet Kumar Singh	JD(U)	37,634	36.00	6,657	6.37
Siwan	27	Basantpur	Manikchand Rai	RJD	47,922	47.84	Satyadeo Prasad Singh	BJP	33,137	33.08	14,785	14.76
Siwan	28	Goreakothi	Indradeo Prasad	RJD	36,972	41.69	Bhumendra N. Singh	BJP	32,953	37.16	4,019	4.53
Siwan	29	Siwan	Vyas Deo Prasad	BJP	42,756	42.94	Awadh Bihari	RJD	39,587	39.76	3,169	3.18
Siwan	30	Mairwa (SC)	Ramayan Manjhi	BJP	30,148	34.25	Satyadeo Ram	CPI(ML)	29,768	33.81	380	0.43
Siwan	31	Darauli	Amar Nath Yadav	CPI(ML)	30,355	32.58	Sheo Shanker Yadav	RJD	26,347	28.28	4,008	4.30
Siwan	32	Ziradei	Shyam Bahadur Singh	JD(U)	42,267	49.32	Azazul Haque	RJD	27,887	32.54	14,380	16.78
Siwan	33	Maharajganj	Damodar Singh	JD(U)	43,799	50.58	Uma Shankar Singh	RJD	30,833	35.60	12,966	14.97
Siwan	34	Raghunathpur	Jagmato Devi	JD(U)	39,917	42.29	Vijay Shanker Dubey	INC	19,060	20.19	20,857	22.10
Saran	35	Manjhi	Gautam Singh	JD(U)	38,002	42.35	Ravindra Nath Mishra	INC	36,622	40.81	1,380	1.54
Saran	36	Baniapur	Manoranjan Singh	JD(U)	32,440	39.21	Uma Pandey	INC	29,787	36.00	2,653	3.21
Saran	37	Masrakh	Kedar Nath Singh	JD(U)	33,694	37.73	Tarkeshwar Singh	INC	31,572	35.35	2,122	2.38
Saran	38	Taraiya	Ram Das Rai	RJD	29,615	35.44	Janak Singh	BJP	22,802	27.29	6,813	8.15
Saran	39	Marhaura	Lal Babu Rai	IND	35,628	42.14	Jitendra Rai	JD(U)	13,129	15.53	22,499	26.61
Saran	40	Jalalpur	Janardan Singh	BJP	45,468	48.63	Balagul Mobin	RJD	33,782	36.13	11,686	12.50
Saran	41	Chapra	Ram Pravesh Rai	JD(U)	40,371	39.75	Udit Rai	RJD	36,743	36.18	3,628	3.57
Saran	42	Garkha (SC)	Gyan Chand Manjhi	BJP	28,634	34.59	Raghunandan Manjhi	INC	26,817	32.40	1,817	2.20
Saran	43	Parsa	Chhote Lal Ray	JD(U)	41,284	48.02	Chandrika Roy	RJD	30,911	35.95	10,373	12.07
Saran	44	Sonepur	Ramanuj Yadav	RJD	44,139	44.86	Vinay Kumar Singh	BJP	43,026	43.73	1,113	1.13
Vaishali	45	Hajipur	Nityanand Rai	BJP	47,760	43.79	Rajendra Ray	RJD	32,502	29.80	15,258	13.99
Vaishali	46	Raghopur	Rabri Devi	RJD	35,891	42.31	Satish Kumar	JD(U)	30,601	36.08	5,290	6.24
Vaishali	47	Mahnar	Rama Kishore Singh	LJP	40,901	43.66	Munshilal Rai	RJD	36,227	38.67	4,674	4.99
Vaishali	48	Jandaha	Achyutanand Singh	LJP	37,973	38.89	Umesh Kushawaha	RJD	34,207	35.03	3,766	3.86
Vaishali	49	Patepur (SC)	Prema Chaudhary	RJD	32,792	36.65	Mahendra Baitha	LJP	29,276	32.72	3,516	3.93
Vaishali	50	Mahua (SC)	Shiv Chandra Ram	RJD	36,642	39.48	Dasai Chowdhary	JD(U)	29,627	31.92	7,015	7.56
Vaishali	51	Lalganj	Vijay Kumar Shukla	JD(U)	36,852	39.41	Rajkumar Sah	RJD	33,041	35.33	3,811	4.08
Vaishali	52	Vaishali	Brishin Patel	JD(U)	34,426	36.46	Veena Sahi	INC	31,931	33.81	2,495	2.64
Muzaffarpur	53	Paru	Ashok Kumar Singh	BJP	43,569	42.68	Mithilesh Ps. Yadav	RJD	40,489	39.66	3,080	3.02
Muzaffarpur	54	Sahebganj	Raju Kumar Singh	JD(U)	47,591	46.77	Ram Vichar Rai	RJD	42,323	41.60	5,268	5.18
Muzaffarpur	55	Baruraj	Shashi Kumar Ray	JD(U)	32,992	33.90	Brij Kishor Singh	RJD	30,018	30.84	2,974	3.06
Muzaffarpur	56	Kanti	Ajit Kumar	JD(U)	38,294	38.83	Md. Haidar Azad	RJD	28,091	28.49	10,203	10.35
Muzaffarpur	57	Kurhani	Manoj Kumar Singh	JD(U)	43,714	41.72	Ajay Nishad	RJD	35,324	33.71	8,390	8.01
Muzaffarpur	58	Sakra (SC)	Bilat Paswan	JD(U)	36,020	38.47	Lal Babu Ram	RJD	35,948	38.39	72	0.08
Muzaffarpur	59	Muzaffarpur	Vijendra Choudhary	IND	59,410	51.37	Vinita Vijay	INC	34,572	29.89	24,838	21.47
Muzaffarpur	60	Bochaha (SC)	Ramai Ram	RJD	46,861	42.08	Shiv Nath Chaudhary	JD(U)	41,081	36.89	5,780	5.19
Muzaffarpur	61	Gaighatti	Maheshwar Ps Yadav	RJD	34,081	39.50	Ashok Kumar Singh	JD(U)	30,768	35.66	3,313	3.84
Muzaffarpur	62	Aurai	Arjun Ray	JD(U)	44,891	54.69	Abhay Kumar	IND	13,521	16.47	31,370	38.22
Muzaffarpur	63	Minapur	Dinesh Prasad	JD(U)	40,070	41.48	Hind Kesari Yadav	RJD	28,566	29.57	11,504	11.91
Sitamarhi	64	Runisaidpur	Gudi Devi	JD(U)	43,402	41.94	Bhola Rai	RJD	28,866	27.89	14,536	14.05
Sitamarhi	65	Belsand	Sanjay Kumar Gupta	RJD	30,899	36.66	Sunita Singh	JD(U)	29,516	35.02	1,383	1.64
Sheohar	66	Sheohar	Ajit Kumar Jha	RJD	31,331	32.80	Thakur Ratnakar	JD(U)	31,126	32.59	205	0.21
Sitamarhi	67	Sitamarhi	Sunil Kumar Pintu	BJP	50,973	46.06	Md. Khalil Ansari	INC	29,720	26.86	21,253	19.21
Sitamarhi	68	Bathnaha	Nagina Devi	LJP	35,640	33.51	Suryadeo Rai	RJD	26,202	24.63	9,438	8.87
Sitamarhi	69	Majorganj (SC)	Dinkar Ram	BJP	44,146	51.77	Lalita Devi	INC	24,676	28.94	19,470	22.83
Sitamarhi	70	Sonbarsa	Ram Chandra Purvey	RJD	35,843	36.17	Amzad Hussain	BSP	23,537	23.75	12,306	12.42
Sitamarhi	71	Sursand	Jai Nandan Prasad	RJD	33,233	35.07	Baidyanath Prasad	BJP	32,739	34.55	494	0.52
Sitamarhi	72	Pupri	Shahid Ali Khan	JD(U)	38,301	39.63	Ram Dulari Devi	RJD	31,639	32.73	6,662	6.89
Madhubani	73	Benipatti	Shaligram Yadav	JD(U)	38,825	42.48	Yugeshwar Jha	INC	31,447	34.41	7,378	8.07
Madhubani	74	Bisfi	Hari Bhushan Thakur	IND	33,772	40.92	Md. Ahmar Hassan	INC	26,967	32.68	6,805	8.25
Madhubani	75	Harlakhi	Ram Naresh Pandey	CPI	37,437	36.70	Sita Ram Yadav	RJD	34,574	33.89	2,863	2.81
Madhubani	76	Khajauli (SC)	Ram Prit Paswan	BJP	37,827	41.35	Ram Lakhan Raman	RJD	29,687	32.45	8,140	8.90
Madhubani	77	Babubarhi	Kapil Deb Kamat	JD(U)	39,826	43.07	Uma Kant Yadav	RJD	37,744	40.82	2,082	2.25
Madhubani	78	Madhubani	Ram Deo Mahto	BJP	38,007	37.62	Aslam	RJD	26,055	25.79	11,952	11.83
Madhubani	79	Pandaul	Vinod Narayan Jha	BJP	33,552	38.10	Naiyar Azam	RJD	30,241	34.34	3,311	3.76
Madhubani	80	Jhanjharpur	Nitish Mishra	JD(U)	41,004	46.95	Ram Autar Ch.	RJD	24,344	27.88	16,660	19.08
Madhubani	81	Phulparas	Deo Nath Yadav	SP	29,500	35.12	Bharat Bhushan	JD(U)	24,522	29.19	4,978	5.93
Madhubani	82	Laukaha	Hari Prasad Sah	JD(U)	35,737	41.83	Anis Ahmad	RJD	26,990	31.59	8,747	10.24
Madhubani	83	Madhepur	Jagat Narayan Singh	RJD	31,544	35.71	Roop Narayan Jha	LJP	24,765	28.04	6,779	7.67
Darbhanga	84	Manigachhi	Lalit Kumar Yadav	RJD	32,553	37.55	Prabhakar Chaudhary	JD(U)	30,625	35.32	1,928	2.22
Darbhanga	85	Bahera	Abdul Bari Siddiqui	RJD	38,910	44.76	Ram Narayan Thakur	BJP	31,096	35.77	7,814	8.99
Darbhanga	86	Ghanshyampur	Izhar Ahmad	LJP	33,888	33.24	Dr. Mahabir Prasad	RJD	29,035	28.48	4,853	4.76
Darbhanga	87	Baheri	Hare Krishna Yadav	RJD	33,420	35.54	Narendra Km. Singh	JD(U)	26,465	28.14	6,955	7.40
Darbhanga	88	Darbhanga; Rural (SC)	Pitamber Paswan	RJD	31,258	37.03	Ram Chandra Paswan	JD(U)	20,864	24.71	10,394	12.31
Darbhanga	89	Darbhanga	Sanjay Saraogi	BJP	53,263	53.72	Madan Mohan Jha	INC	28,280	28.52	24,983	25.20
Darbhanga	90	Keoti	Ashok Kumar Yadav	BJP	41,817	43.46	Mahboob Ahmad Khan	RJD	35,165	36.55	6,652	6.91
Darbhanga	91	Jale	Ram Niwas Pd.	RJD	30,422	34.64	Vijay Kumar Mishra	BJP	30,218	34.41	204	0.23
Darbhanga	92	Hayaghat	Harinandan Yadav	RJD	25,841	30.70	Uma Kant Chaudhary	JD(U)	23,917	28.42	1,924	2.29
Samastipur	93	Kalyanpur	Ashwamedh Devi	JD(U)	47,220	45.69	Ashok Prasad Verma	RJD	41,293	39.95	5,927	5.73
Samastipur	94	Warisnagar (SC)	Maheshwar Hazari	LJP	33,565	36.73	Bhikhar Baitha	RJD	29,886	32.70	3,679	4.03
Samastipur	95	Samastipur	Ramnath Thakur	JD(U)	45,969	42.59	Nizam Ahmad	RJD	32,787	30.37	13,182	12.21
Samastipur	96	Sarairanjan	Ramchandra Nishad	RJD	36,995	34.42	Vijay Chaudhary	JD(U)	27,725	25.80	9,270	8.63
Samastipur	97	Mohiuddin Nagar	Ajai Kumar Bulganin	RJD	45,219	44.18	Rana Gangeshwar	LJP	39,148	38.25	6,071	5.93
Samastipur	98	Dalsinghsarai	Ram Lakhan Mahto	RJD	41,456	35.95	Sheel Kumar Roy	LJP	38,884	33.72	2,572	2.23
Samastipur	99	Bibhutpur	Ram Deo Verma	CPI(M)	54,616	43.66	Ram Balak Singh	LJP	41,865	33.47	12,751	10.19
Samastipur	100	Rosera	Gajendra Prasad Singh	RJD	38,142	38.96	Ashok Kumar	JD(U)	35,010	35.76	3,132	3.20
Samastipur	101	Singhia (SC)	Dr. Ashok Kumar	INC	32,764	38.51	Ram Sewak Hazari	LJP	21,323	25.06	11,441	13.45
Samastipur	102	Hasanpur	Sunil Kumar Pushpam	RJD	31,553	37.03	Ram Narayan Mandal	LJP	24,115	28.30	7,438	8.73
Begusarai	103	Balia	Jamshed Asraf	JD(U)	46,987	50.73	Srinarayan Yadav	RJD	28,992	31.30	17,995	19.43
Begusarai	104	Matihani	Narendar Kumar Singh	IND	47,906	47.77	Abhay Kumar Singh	INC	25,518	25.45	22,388	22.32
Begusarai	105	Begusarai	Bhola Singh	BJP	39,768	36.26	Kamli Mahato	CPI	27,733	25.29	12,035	10.97
Begusarai	106	Barauni	Rajendra Prasad Singh	CPI	34,102	35.40	Surendra Mehta	BJP	29,145	30.25	4,957	5.15
Begusarai	107	Bachwara	Ramdeo Rai	INC	36,807	35.99	Awdhesh Kumar Rai	CPI	33,789	33.04	3,018	2.95
Begusarai	108	Cheria Bariarpur	Anil Chaudhary	LJP	32,892	34.28	Kumari Savitri	RJD	32,359	33.73	533	0.56
Begusarai	109	Bakhri (SC)	Ram Binod Paswan	CPI	37,876	41.90	Ramanand Ram	RJD	24,109	26.67	13,767	15.23
Supaul	110	Raghopur	Niraj Kumar Singh	JD(U)	45,079	38.75	Jai Vardhan Yadav	INC	25,691	22.08	19,388	16.67
Supaul	111	Kishunpur	Aniruddha Yadav	JD(U)	52,668	56.90	Vijay Kumar Gupta	INC	27,107	29.29	25,561	27.62
Supaul	112	Supaul	Bijendra Prasad Yadav	JD(U)	48,457	47.28	Md. Israil Rayeen	RJD	36,222	35.34	12,235	11.94
Supaul	113	Tribeniganj	Vishwa Mohan Kumar	JD(U)	30,889	35.47	Anita Devi	RJD	23,459	26.94	7,430	8.53
Supaul	114	Chhatapur (SC)	Vishwa Mohan Bharti	JD(U)	39,949	48.07	Mahendra Narayan	RJD	28,014	33.71	11,935	14.36
Madhepura	115	Kumarkhand (SC)	Ramesh Rishidev	JD(U)	32,198	45.05	Amit Kumar Bharti	RJD	30,220	42.28	1,978	2.77
Madhepura	116	Singheshwar	Rameshwar P. Yadav	JD(U)	28,917	35.31	Arvind Kumar	RJD	27,986	34.17	931	1.14
Saharsa	117	Saharsa	Sajeev Kumar Jha	BJP	40,816	39.12	Dr. Abdul Gafoor	RJD	34,657	33.22	6,159	5.90
Saharsa	118	Mahishi	Gunjeshwar Sah	JD(U)	38,283	45.54	Surendra Yadav	RJD	31,400	37.35	6,883	8.19
Saharsa	119	Simri-Bakhtiarpur	Dinesh Chandra	JD(U)	43,246	46.01	Mehboob Ali Kaiser	INC	35,184	37.43	8,062	8.58
Madhepura	120	Madhepura	Manindra Mandal	JD(U)	34,582	38.95	Dr. Ashok Kumar	RJD	26,710	30.08	7,872	8.87
Saharsa	121	Sonbarsa	Kishore Kumar	IND	46,759	47.01	Ranjit Yadav	RJD	30,598	30.77	16,161	16.25
Madhepura	122	Kishanganj	Renu Kumari	JD(U)	37,286	45.59	Rabindra Yadav	IND	15,738	19.24	21,548	26.35
Madhepura	123	Alamnagar	Narendra Nr. Yadav	JD(U)	39,676	45.67	Chandeshwari Sinh	LJP	29,589	34.06	10,087	11.61
Purnia	124	Rupauli	Bima Bharti	RJD	28,681	32.49	Shankar Singh	LJP	26,690	30.24	1,991	2.26
Purnia	125	Dhamdaha	Dilip Kumar Yadav	RJD	39,175	39.42	Leshi Singh	JD(U)	35,578	35.80	3,597	3.62
Purnia	126	Banmankhi (SC)	Krishna Kumar Rishi	BJP	38,140	46.75	Kant Lal Rishi	RJD	29,320	35.94	8,820	10.81
Araria	127	Raniganj (SC)	Ramji Das Rishidev	BJP	34,796	32.43	Shanti Devi	RJD	30,690	28.61	4,106	3.83
Araria	128	Narpatganj	Janardan Yadav	BJP	36,329	31.07	Anil Kumar Yadav	RJD	32,122	27.47	4,207	3.60
Araria	129	Forbesganj	Laxmi Narayan Mehta	BJP	61,354	47.71	Zakir Hussain Khan	RJD	55,293	43.00	6,061	4.71
Araria	130	Araria	Pradeep Kumar Singh	BJP	36,089	32.71	Moidur Rahman	INC	32,938	29.85	3,151	2.86
Araria	131	Sikti	Murli Dhar Mandal	JD(U)	47,758	35.04	Aftab Azim	LJP	25,934	19.03	21,824	16.01
Araria	132	Jokihat	Manzar Alam	JD(U)	39,007	37.12	Sarfraz Alam	RJD	36,481	34.71	2,526	2.40
Kishanganj	133	Bahadurganj	Md. Tousif Alam	INC	58,938	62.32	Sikandar Singh	IND	15,917	16.83	43,021	45.49
Kishanganj	134	Thakurganj	Gopal Kumar Agarwal	SP	38,592	29.62	Mhd. Jawed	INC	32,483	24.93	6,109	4.69
Kishanganj	135	Kishanganj	Akhatarul Iman	RJD	47,693	39.46	Sanjeev Yadav	BJP	39,239	32.46	8,454	6.99
Purnia	136	Amour	Abdul Jalil Mastan	INC	42,041	49.05	Saba Zafar	SP	27,423	32.00	14,618	17.06
Purnia	137	Baisi	Syed Ruknudin	IND	30,153	31.99	Abdus Subhan	RJD	26,042	27.63	4,111	4.36
Purnia	138	Kasba	Pradip Kumar Das	BJP	49,113	38.73	Md. Afak Alam	RJD	43,104	33.99	6,009	4.74
Purnia	139	Purnea	Raj Kishore Keshri	BJP	46,841	39.43	Ram Charitra Yadav	RJD	30,262	25.47	16,579	13.95
Katihar	140	Korha (SC)	Sunita Devi	INC	49,632	45.76	Mahesh Paswan	BJP	37,483	34.56	12,149	11.20
Katihar	141	Barari	Bibhash Chaudhary	BJP	38,493	36.77	Muhammed Shakur	NCP	35,330	33.74	3,163	3.02
Katihar	142	Katihar	Tar Kishor Prasad	BJP	47,777	40.28	Ram P. Mahto	RJD	47,661	40.19	116	0.10
Katihar	143	Kadwa	Abdul Jalil	NCP	46,221	41.33	Himraj Singh	BJP	33,685	30.12	12,536	11.21
Katihar	144	Barsoi	Munnaf Alam	CPI(ML)	39,872	33.33	Dulal Goswami	BJP	38,035	31.80	1,837	1.54
Katihar	145	Pranpur	Mahendra N. Yadav	RJD	38,772	38.36	Binod Kumar Singh	BJP	34,386	34.02	4,386	4.34
Katihar	146	Manihari	Mubarak Hussain	INC	27,822	32.91	Vishwanath Singh	JD(U)	26,538	31.39	1,284	1.52
Bhagalpur	147	Pirpainti	Shobha Kant Mandal	RJD	31,046	27.02	Dilip Kumar Sinha	BJP	29,591	25.75	1,455	1.27
Bhagalpur	148	Colgong	Ajay Kumar Mandal	JD(U)	58,640	47.69	Sadanand Singh	INC	45,068	36.66	13,572	11.04
Bhagalpur	149	Nathnagar	Sudha Shrivastav	JD(U)	45,646	39.87	Pravez Khan	RJD	41,211	36.00	4,435	3.87
Bhagalpur	150	Bhagalpur	Ashwini Kumar Ch.	BJP	53,698	58.12	Prawin Singh	INC	31,921	34.55	21,777	23.57
Bhagalpur	151	Gopalpur	Narendra Kr. Niraj	JD(U)	48,049	50.11	Amit Rana	RJD	33,037	34.46	15,012	15.66
Bhagalpur	152	Bihpur	Shailesh Kumar	RJD	33,284	41.56	Kumar Shailendra	BJP	32,842	41.01	442	0.55
Bhagalpur	153	Sultanganj (SC)	Sudhanshu Bhaskar	JD(U)	48,063	46.55	Ganesh Paswan	RJD	36,367	35.22	11,696	11.33
Banka	154	Amarpur	Surendra Prasad Singh	RJD	33,679	38.11	Bedanand Singh	JD(U)	31,278	35.39	2,401	2.72
Banka	155	Dhuraiya (SC)	Bhudeo Choudhary	JD(U)	47,697	46.72	Munilal Paswan	CPI	29,467	28.86	18,230	17.86
Banka	156	Banka	Ram Narayan Mandal	BJP	44,470	46.91	Jawed Iqbal Ansari	RJD	35,200	37.13	9,270	9.78
Banka	157	Belhar	Janardan Manjhi	JD(U)	32,970	40.60	Ramdeo Yadav	RJD	27,142	33.42	5,828	7.18
Banka	158	Katoria	Raj Kishor Prasad	RJD	38,724	36.35	Manoj Yadav	BJP	38,644	36.27	80	0.08
Jamui	159	Chakai	Phalguni Prasad Yadav	BJP	24,975	26.84	Arjun Mandal	JD(U)	19,292	20.73	5,683	6.11
Jamui	160	Jhajha	Damodar Rawat	JD(U)	37,789	44.66	Rashid Ahmad	RJD	25,445	30.07	12,344	14.59
Munger	161	Tarapur	Shakuni Chaudhury	RJD	32,828	41.38	Rajeev Kumar Singh	JD(U)	32,217	40.61	611	0.77
Munger	162	Kharagpur	Anant Kumar Satyarthi	JD(U)	43,945	46.69	Shanti Devi	RJD	31,345	33.30	12,600	13.39
Khagaria	163	Parbatta	Ramanand Prasad Singh	JD(U)	45,684	44.17	Rajesh Kumar	IND	41,539	40.16	4,145	4.01
Khagaria	164	Chautham	Panna Lal Singh	JD(U)	30,292	30.83	Sunita Sharma	LJP	29,270	29.79	1,022	1.04
Khagaria	165	Khagaria	Poonam Devi	JD(U)	37,899	38.65	Gita Yadav	CPI(M)	26,845	27.38	11,054	11.27
Khagaria	166	Alauli (SC)	Pashupati Kumar Paras	LJP	40,870	46.75	Rambriksha Sada	RJD	32,293	36.94	8,577	9.81
Munger	167	Monghyr	Monazir Hassan	JD(U)	59,381	64.23	Dhanraj Singh	INC	21,463	23.22	37,918	41.01
Munger	168	Jamalpur	Shailesh Kumar	JD(U)	52,682	58.11	Upendra Pd. Verma	RJD	19,976	22.03	32,706	36.08
Lakhisarai	169	Surajgarha	Prem Ranjan Patel	BJP	39,703	38.97	Prahalad Yadav	RJD	37,239	36.55	2,464	2.42
Jamui	170	Jamui	Abhay Singh	JD(U)	38,968	37.09	Vijay Prakash	RJD	29,878	28.44	9,090	8.65
Jamui	171	Sikandra (SC)	Rameshwar Paswan	JD(U)	38,060	48.65	Prayag Choudhary	RJD	22,695	29.01	15,365	19.64
Lakhisarai	172	Lakhisarai	Phulena Singh	RJD	41,448	40.27	Vijay Kumar Sinha	BJP	41,368	40.19	80	0.08
Sheikhpura	173	Sheikhpura	Sunila Devi	INC	35,976	43.92	Rinku Devi	IND	23,528	28.72	12,448	15.20
Nalanda	174	Barbigha (SC)	Ramsundar Kanaujia	JD(U)	34,223	48.44	Mahavir Choudhary	INC	24,550	34.75	9,673	13.69
Nalanda	175	Asthawan	Jitendra Kumar	JD(U)	40,474	55.55	Dr. Puspanjay	IND	24,988	34.30	15,486	21.26
Nalanda	176	Bihar	Dr. Sunil Kumar	JD(U)	62,634	54.80	Syed N. Navi	RJD	39,227	34.32	23,407	20.48
Nalanda	177	Rajgir (SC)	Satyadeo Narain Arya	BJP	36,344	57.45	Arjun Paswan	CPI	10,328	16.33	26,016	41.12
Nalanda	178	Nalanda	Shrawon Kumar	JD(U)	37,806	46.69	Ram Naresh Singh	AIFB	33,756	41.68	4,050	5.00
Nalanda	179	Islampur	Ramswaroop Prasad	JD(U)	46,510	51.28	Rakesh Roshan	CPI	27,412	30.22	19,098	21.06
Nalanda	180	Hilsa	Ramcharitra P. Singh	JD(U)	41,371	47.71	Rajesh Kumar Singh	LJP	29,111	33.57	12,260	14.14
Nalanda	181	Chandi	Hari Narayan Singh	JD(U)	37,186	52.03	Naresh Kumar Yadav	LJP	12,930	18.09	24,256	33.94
Nalanda	182	Harnaut	Sunil Kumar	JD(U)	44,110	60.94	Uday Shankar Prasad	RJD	11,517	15.91	32,593	45.03
Patna	183	Mokameh	Anant Kumar Singh	JD(U)	35,877	39.69	Nalini Ranjan Sharma	LJP	33,042	36.55	2,835	3.14
Patna	184	Barh	Gyanendra Singh	JD(U)	37,667	41.64	Anil Kumar Singh	RJD	24,031	26.56	13,636	15.07
Patna	185	Bakhtiarpur	Vinode Yadav	BJP	35,774	40.24	Anirudh Kumar	RJD	32,719	36.80	3,055	3.44
Patna	186	Fatwa (SC)	Saryug Paswan	JD(U)	35,130	39.85	Sanjeev Prasad Tony	INC	25,066	28.44	10,064	11.42
Patna	187	Masaurhi	Punam Devi	JD(U)	41,314	40.53	Raj Kishore Prasad	RJD	30,047	29.47	11,267	11.05
Patna	188	Patna West	Navin Kishore Pd. Sinha	BJP	1,17,915	69.33	Rajesh Kumar Sinha	INC	31,796	18.70	86,119	50.64
Patna	189	Patna Central	Arun Kumar Sinha	BJP	89,614	69.29	Aquil Haider	NCP	29,574	22.87	60,040	46.42
Patna	190	Patna East	Nand Kishore Yadav	BJP	70,148	72.99	Bharti Devi	RJD	34,178	35.56	35,970	37.43
Patna	191	Dinapur	Asha Devi	BJP	49,989	52.01	Ramanand Yadav	RJD	32,827	34.16	17,162	17.86
Patna	192	Maner	Shrikant Nirala	RJD	34,669	36.79	Sacchidanand Rai	JD(U)	30,538	32.41	4,131	4.38
Patna	193	Phulwari (SC)	Shyam Rajak	RJD	44,999	38.57	Arun Manjhi	JD(U)	44,420	38.07	579	0.50
Patna	194	Bikram	Anil Kumar	BJP	41,140	43.16	Shyam Deo Singh	RJD	26,967	28.29	14,173	14.87
Patna	195	Paliganj	Nand Kumar Nanda	CPI(ML)	30,118	30.17	Dr. Usha Vidyarthi	BJP	29,228	29.28	890	0.89
Bhojpur	196	Sandesh	Vijendra Kumar Yadav	RJD	40,387	39.01	Sanjay Singh	BJP	28,894	27.91	11,493	11.10
Bhojpur	197	Barhara	Asha Devi	JD(U)	41,129	40.81	Raghvendra Pratap	RJD	37,945	37.65	3,184	3.16
Bhojpur	198	Arrah	Amrendra Pratap Singh	BJP	53,489	47.19	Md. Nwaj Alam	RJD	38,337	33.82	15,152	13.37
Bhojpur	199	Shahpur	Munni Devi	BJP	34,121	35.91	Shivanand Tiwary	RJD	31,314	32.95	2,807	2.95
Buxar	200	Brahmpur	Ajeet Chaudhari	RJD	32,138	34.92	Vivek Thakur	BJP	25,254	27.44	6,884	7.48
Buxar	201	Buxar	Hriday Narayan Singh	BSP	46,192	45.17	Prof. Sukhda Pandey	BJP	45,165	44.16	1,027	1.00
Buxar	202	Rajpur (SC)	Shyam Payari Devi	JD(U)	32,137	36.14	Santosh Kumar Nirala	BSP	26,437	29.73	5,700	6.41
Buxar	203	Dumraon	Dadan Singh	AJVD	31,089	29.84	Rambihari Singh	JD(U)	22,584	21.68	8,505	8.16
Bhojpur	204	Jagdishpur	Sri Bhagwan Singh	JD(U)	41,992	41.26	Dinesh Kumar Singh	RJD	40,889	40.18	1,103	1.08
Bhojpur	205	Piro	Narendra Kumar Pandey	JD(U)	46,338	44.02	Triveni Singh	RJD	35,963	34.17	10,375	9.86
Bhojpur	206	Sahar (SC)	Ram Naresh Ram	CPI(ML)	40,866	47.71	Jyoti	INC	21,717	25.35	19,149	22.36
Rohtas	207	Karakat	Arun Singh	CPI(ML)	36,721	35.22	Rajeshwar Raj	JD(U)	23,175	22.23	13,546	12.99
Rohtas	208	Bikramganj	Jai Kumar Singh	JD(U)	41,765	41.66	Akhlaque Ahmad	RJD	38,024	37.93	3,741	3.73
Rohtas	209	Dinara	Sita Sundari Devi	BSP	41,938	37.63	Ramdhani Singh	JD(U)	41,054	36.84	884	0.79
Kaimur	210	Ramgarh	Jagadanand Singh	RJD	51,804	48.75	Ram Pratap Singh	BSP	29,987	28.22	21,817	20.53
Kaimur	211	Mohania (SC)	Chhedi Paswan	JD(U)	49,487	43.40	Suresh Pasi	RJD	35,325	30.98	14,162	12.42
Kaimur	212	Bhabhua	Ram Chandra Yadav	BSP	37,778	29.49	Anand B. Pandey	BJP	31,950	24.94	5,828	4.55
Kaimur	213	Chainpur	Mahabali Singh	RJD	34,655	31.27	Brij Kishor Bind	BJP	32,739	29.54	1,916	1.73
Rohtas	214	Sasaram	Jawahar Prasad	BJP	53,904	45.47	Ashok Kushwaha	RJD	44,079	37.18	9,825	8.29
Rohtas	215	Chenari (SC)	Lalan Paswan	JD(U)	48,645	41.69	Jawahar Paswan	RJD	30,904	26.48	17,741	15.20
Rohtas	216	Nokha	Rameshwar Chaurasiya	BJP	45,653	43.99	Anand Mohan Singh	RJD	34,264	33.02	11,389	10.97
Rohtas	217	Dehri	Pradeep Joshi	IND	70,558	59.10	Md. Ilyas Hussain	RJD	27,281	22.85	43,277	36.25
Aurangabad	218	Nabinagar	Vijay Kumar Singh	LJP	42,371	40.37	Bheem Kumar Yadav	RJD	37,617	35.84	4,754	4.53
Aurangabad	219	Deo (SC)	Renu Devi	JD(U)	32,417	36.24	Suresh Paswan	RJD	31,582	35.31	835	0.93
Aurangabad	220	Aurangabad	Ramadhar Singh	BJP	55,813	47.38	Suresh Mehta	RJD	35,953	30.52	19,860	16.86
Aurangabad	221	Rafiganj	Md. Nehaluddin	RJD	29,194	36.39	Sunil Kumar	JD(U)	25,384	31.64	3,810	4.75
Aurangabad	222	Obra	Satyanarayan Singh	RJD	32,618	29.26	Raja Ram Singh	CPI(ML)	24,023	21.55	8,595	7.71
Aurangabad	223	Goh	Ranvijay Kumar	JD(U)	26,526	28.66	Deo Narayan Yadav	INC	22,596	24.42	3,930	4.25
Arwal	224	Arwal	Dularchand Singh	LJP	33,810	37.84	Ranjeet Kumar	BJP	25,371	28.39	8,439	9.44
Arwal	225	Kurtha	Suchitra Sinha	JD(U)	31,372	38.38	Sahdeo Prasad Yadav	RJD	18,580	22.73	12,792	15.65
Jehanabad	226	Makhdumpur	Krishna Nandan Verma	RJD	32,252	40.22	Ramashray Singh	JD(U)	23,628	29.46	8,624	10.75
Jehanabad	227	Jahanabad	Sachidanand Yadav	RJD	28,696	36.16	Md. Akber Imam	JD(U)	24,215	30.52	4,481	5.65
Jehanabad	228	Ghosi	Jagdish Sharma	JD(U)	54,114	57.54	Ajay Singh	RJD	24,994	26.58	29,120	30.97
Gaya	229	Belaganj	Surendra Prasad	RJD	33,475	44.25	Md. Amjad	JD(U)	27,125	35.85	6,350	8.39
Gaya	230	Konch	Dr. Anil Kumar	JD(U)	34,062	39.84	Sheobachan Yadav	RJD	30,664	35.87	3,398	3.97
Gaya	231	Gaya Mufassil	Awadesh Km. Singh	INC	27,282	29.73	Vindeshwari Yadav	IND	24,617	26.83	2,665	2.90
Gaya	232	Gaya Town	Prem Kumar	BJP	48,099	58.23	Sanjay Sahay	INC	23,208	28.10	24,891	30.14
Gaya	233	Imamganj (SC)	Uday Narayan	JD(U)	30,665	40.48	Ram Swaroop Paswan	RJD	24,023	31.71	6,642	8.77
Gaya	234	Gurua	Shakeel Ah. Khan	RJD	27,777	31.15	Birbhadra Yashraj	BJP	26,197	29.38	1,580	1.77
Gaya	235	Bodh Gaya (SC)	Hari Manjhi	BJP	25,383	32.28	Phoolchand Manjhi	RJD	23,670	30.11	1,713	2.18
Gaya	236	Barachatti (SC)	Jitan Ram Manjhi	JD(U)	29,298	35.79	Samta Devi	RJD	25,156	30.73	4,142	5.06
Gaya	237	Fatehpur (SC)	Ajay Paswan	RJD	27,883	36.71	Shyamdeo Paswan	LJP	25,060	33.00	2,823	3.72
Gaya	238	Atri	Kunti Devi	RJD	32,162	38.61	Virendra Singh	BJP	29,240	35.10	2,922	3.51
Nawada	239	Nawada	Purnima Yadav	IND	40,430	34.23	Raj Ballabh Yadav	RJD	38,426	32.53	2,004	1.70
Nawada	240	Rajauli (SC)	Banwari Ram	BJP	45,699	47.03	Nand Kishore Ch.	RJD	36,622	37.69	9,077	9.34
Nawada	241	Gobindpur	Kaushal Yadav	IND	41,859	47.20	Sanjay Km. Prabhat	RJD	26,583	29.98	15,276	17.23
Nawada	242	Warsaliganj	Pradeep Mahto	IND	37,406	42.29	Aruna Devi	INC	36,851	41.66	555	0.63
Nawada	243	Hisua	Anil Singh	BJP	43,276	53.97	Aditya Singh	INC	26,809	33.43	16,467	20.54

== See also ==
- Politics of Bihar
