= Raniganj (disambiguation) =

Raniganj is a neighbourhood in Asansol, West Bengal, India.

Raniganj may also refer to:

In Asansol, West Bengal

- Raniganj (community development block), West Bengal
- Raniganj, West Bengal Assembly constituency, West Bengal
- Raniganj railway station
- Raniganj Coalfield
- Raniganj Girls' College

In Bihar

- Raniganj, Araria town in Bihar
- Raniganj, Araria (community development block) Bihar community development block
- Raniganj, Bihar Assembly constituency, Bihar, India

In Uttar Pradesh

- Raniganj, Gonda, a village in Gonda district of Uttar Pradesh, India
- Raniganj, Pratapgarh district in Uttar Pradesh
  - Raniganj tehsil, sub-district of Pratapgarh
- Raniganj, Uttar Pradesh Assembly constituency in Pratapgarh district
- Ranigunj, Amethi district, a town in Amethi district, Uttar Pradesh

Other places

- Ranigunj, a neighbourhood in Secunderabad, Telangana, India
- Raniganj, Nepal, a village development committee in Sarlahi District in the Janakpur Zone of south-eastern Nepal

== See also ==
- Mission Raniganj, 2023 Indian film about a mining accident at the Raniganj Coalfield
