= Ramji Das Rishidev =

Indian politician (1954–2020)

Minister of Environment & Forest Government of Bihar
- In office 13 April 2008 – 26 November 2010
- Chief Minister: Nitish Kumar
- Preceded by: Ramchandra Sahani
- Succeeded by: Sushil Kumar Modi

Minister of Co-operatives Government of Bihar
- In office 24 November 2005 – 13 April 2008
- Chief Minister: Nitish Kumar
- Succeeded by: Giriraj Singh

Member of Bihar Legislative Assembly
- In office 2005–2010
- Preceded by: Parmanand Rishideo
- Succeeded by: Parmanand Rishideo
- Constituency: Raniganj

Member of Parliament, Lok Sabha
- In office 1998–1999
- Preceded by: Sukdeo Paswan
- Succeeded by: Sukdeo Paswan
- Constituency: Araria

Personal details
- Born: May 6, 1954 Gokhalpur, Araria district, Bihar
- Died: 14 September 2020 (aged 66)
- Party: Bharatiya Janata Party
- Spouse: Sukumari Devi (m. 1972)
- Children: 4 Sons & 3 Daughters
- Occupation: Politician

Ramji Das Rishidev (born 6 May 1954) was an Indian politician and former cabinet minister in the Government of Bihar from November 2005 to November 2010. He represented Araria in Lok Sabha in 1998 and Raniganj in Bihar Legislative Assembly in 2005.
