= Raniganj, Araria =

Coordinates: 26°05′00″N 87°14′10″E

Raniganj is a city and municipality in Araria district of the Indian state of Bihar. It is the headquarter of the Raniganj, Araria (community development block).

== Governance ==
Raniganj is the state assembly constituency.

Achmit Rishidev from Janata Dal (United)(JD(U)) party is the MLA representing the Raniganj constituency in the Bihar legislative assembly. He was elected in 2020 Bihar Legislative Assembly election.

== Languages ==
The main language is Hindi. Some residents speak Maithili, Bhojpuri, Urdu, Bengali, or Marwari.

== Tourism ==
Raniganj has the biggest zoo of Bihar (Vriksha Vatika)

== Healthcare ==
Raniganj has one government hospital and many private hospitals and clinics.

== Transport ==
Daily bus service is available from Purnia, Patna, Siliguri, Kolkata, Bhagalpur, Katihar, Birpur, Jogbani, Saharsa, Darbhanga and Muzaffarpur.

Major daily Hindi newspapers include Dainik Jagaran, Hindustan, Dainik Bhaskar, and Prabhat Khabar.

== Climate ==
Raniganj has hot and wet summers and cold and dry winters.

== Education ==
Many government and private school and colleges operate in Raniganj.

=== Colleges ===
- Y.N.P. Inter College
- S.N.V. Inter College
- K.D. College (for bachelors degrees)

=== Schools ===
- Laljee High School Raniganj
- Kalavati Girls High School
- RamanJi Laxmi Saraswati Sishu Mandir
- Seemanchal Public School
- Modern Public School
- Motherland Public School
- Residential Gurukul
- Swarnim Public School
- Residential Paramount
- Shanti Niketan
- Disha Public School
- Govt. Middle School Raniganj
- Govt. Middle School Hasanpur, Ranganj

=== Coaching institutes ===
- Sankalp Science Study Center
- Lakshaya Classes
- Shanti Niketan Coaching
- Sunrise Coaching Center
- Mathematics Institute
- Rakesh Physics
- Safalta Classes
- Success Point
- Carrer Point Coaching Center
- Lingua English Spoken & Grammar Classes
- Oxford English Institute
- The Classroom For JEE/NEET
- Newton Classes
