= Kishanganj Assembly constituency =

Kishanganj Assembly constituency may refer to these electoral constituencies in India:

- Kishanganj, Bihar Assembly constituency, in Kishanganj district, Bihar (within the Kishanganj Lok Sabha constituency)
- Kishanganj, Madhepura Assembly constituency, in Madhepura district, Bihar
- Kishanganj, Rajasthan Assembly constituency, in Rajasthan
