= Prem Shankar =

Prem Shankar, Prem Shanker or Premshankar is a given name. Notable people with the given name include:

- Prem Shankar Jha (born 1938), Indian economist, journalist and writer
- Prem Shankar Prasad (born 1980), Indian politician
- Prem Shanker Goel (born 1947), Indian space scientist and bureaucrat
- Premshankar Verma, Indian politician
