= Manjeet Kumar Singh =

Indian politician (born 1972)

Deputy Chief Whip of Bihar Legislative Assembly
- Incumbent
- Assumed office 15 May 2026
- Chief Minister: Samrat Choudhary
- Speaker: Dr. Prem Kumar
- Chief Whip: Sanjiv Chaurasiya

Member of the Bihar Legislative Assembly
- Incumbent
- Assumed office 14 November 2025
- Preceded by: Rampravesh Rai
- Constituency: Barauli
- In office 2010–2015
- Preceded by: Deo Dutt Prasad Yadav
- Succeeded by: Mithlesh Tiwari
- Constituency: Baikunthpur, Bihar
- In office 2000–2005
- Preceded by: Deo Dutt Prasad Yadav
- Succeeded by: Deo Dutt Prasad Yadav
- Constituency: Baikunthpur

Personal details
- Born: 7 August 1972 (age 54) Gopalganj
- Citizenship: India
- Party: Janta Dal (United)
- Other political affiliations: Samata Party (former)
- Spouse: Neha Singh
- Children: 3
- Education: Udai Pratap Autonomous College (Bachelor of Arts)
- Occupation: MLA
- Profession: Social Work
- Nickname: Vikaspurush

Manjeet Kumar Singh (born 7 August 1972) is an Indian politician and is a member of the 18th Legislative Assembly of Bihar and has earlier been part of the 12th Legislative Assembly and 15th Legislative Assembly of Bihar of India. He represents Barauli constituency in Gopalganj district of Bihar and has previously represented Baikunthpur constituency in Gopalganj district of Bihar. He is also the Deputy Chief Whip of the ruling NDA alliance in the Bihar Legislative Assembly.

== Personal life ==
Manjeet is the son of Braj Kishore Narayan Singh, a six-time MLA, former Bihar Government minister, and founding member of the Samta Party, and Sudha Devi.

== Education ==
Manjeet completed his early education in Patna, then earned a Bachelor of Arts from Udai Pratap Autonomous College (Purvanchal University) in Varanasi. During his studies, he became actively involved in student politics.

== Political career ==
Manjeet Singh contested his first ever student union elections in college and was elected as the Head of the Sports Department of the Union marking a start to his political career.

Following his father’s demise, former Chief Minister Nitish Kumar nominated him as the Samata Party candidate for the Baikunthpur Legislative Assembly in 2000. He won the election against Rashtriya Janata Dal's Deo Dutt Prasad Yadav.

In October 2003, Manjeet with other key leaders of the Samata Party merged with Janata Dal (United).

In 2010, he again won the election against Rashtriya Janata Dal's Deo Dutt Prasad Yadav.

In 2020 after the seat was shared to Mithilesh Tiwari of Bharatiya Janata Party as in form of coalition. Manjeet Singh gave his resignation from Janata Dal (United) and contested independently in 2020 Bihar Legislative Assembly election. He received 43,354 votes (23.67%) as an independent candidate.

In 2022, Manjeet was offered a position in Rashtriya Janata Dal, but Nitish Kumar personally intervened, preventing him from joining and instead inducting him back where he was appointed as the state party vice president.

In 2025, National Democratic Alliance fielded him in Barauli, apart from his usual constituency where he won by over 12,000 votes against Rashtriya Janata Dal's Dilip Singh.

In 2026, he was appointed Deputy Chief Whip of the ruling party in the Samrat Chaudhary's cabinet reshuffle.

== Posts held ==
From	To	Position	Comments
2000	2005	Member, 12th Legislative Assembly of Bihar from Baikunthpur	
2010	2015	Member, 15th Legislative Assembly of Bihar from Baikunthpur	
2022	2025	State Vice-President of Janata Dal (United)	
2025	2030	Member, 18th Legislative Assembly of Bihar from Barauli	
2026	Present	Deputy Chief Whip of the Bihar Legislative Assembly	

== Elections contested ==
=== 2025 ===
2025 Bihar Legislative Assembly election: Barauli
Party	Candidate	Votes	%	±%
JD(U)	Manjeet Kumar Singh	88,657	45.66	
RJD	Dilip Kumar Singh	76,283	39.29	+0.78
BSP	Reyazul Haque Urf Raju	13,397	6.9	+4.14
Independent	Sonu Kumar	4,804	2.47	
JSP	Faiz Ahmad	2,911	1.5	
Independent	Sita Devi	2,204	1.14	
NOTA	None of the above	4,006	2.06	+1.68
Majority		12,374	6.37	−1.67
Turnout		194,177	68.33	+9.65
JD(U) gain from BJP		Swing		

=== 2020 ===
Bihar Assembly election, 2020: Baikunthpur
Party	Candidate	Votes	%	±%
RJD	Prem Shankar Prasad	67,807	37.01	
BJP	Mithilesh Tiwari	56,694	30.95	−4.16
Independent	Manjeet Kumar Singh	43,354	23.67	
Independent	Rajendra Prasad	2,010	1.1	
NOTA	None of the above	4,097	2.24	−0.77
Majority		11,113	6.06	−2.76
Turnout		183,196	57.71	+0.93
RJD gain from BJP		Swing		
