= Baikunthpur, Bihar Assembly constituency =

- Constituency No. -99 for the Bihar Legislative Assembly

Constituency details
- Country: India
- Region: East India
- State: Bihar
- District: Gopalganj
- Established: 1951
- Total electors: 308,361

Member of Legislative Assembly
- 18th Bihar Legislative Assembly
- Incumbent Mithlesh Tiwari; Minister of Education, Bihar
- Party: BJP
- Alliance: NDA
- Elected year: 2025
- Preceded by: Prem Shankar Prasad, RJD

Baikunthpur
- Assembly constituency
- Location within Bihar
- Coordinates: 26°17′09″N 84°44′00″E
- Country: India
- State: Bihar
- District: Gopalganj
- Constituency No.: 99
- Type: Open
- Lok Sabha constituency: 17. Gopalganj (SC)
- Electoral system: First past the post

Baikunthpur Assembly constituency is an assembly constituency in Dighwa Dubauli locality of Gopalganj district in the Indian state of Bihar.

== Overview ==
As per Delimitation of Parliamentary and Assembly constituencies Order, 2008, No. 99 Baikunthpur Assembly constituency is composed of the following: Baikunthpur and Sidhwalia community development blocks; Rampur, Salempur Purvi, Salempur Paschimi, Hasanpur, Sadaua, Pipra and Khajuriya gram panchayats of Barauli CD Block.

Baikunthpur Assembly constituency is part of No. 17 Gopalganj (Lok Sabha constituency) (SC).

== Members of the Legislative Assembly ==
Year	Name	Party
1952	Shivbachan Trivedi	Indian National Congress
1957	Trivikram Deo Narain Singh	Independent politician
1962	Shivbachan Trivedi	Indian National Congress
1967	Sabhapati Singh	Samyukta Socialist Party
1969	Shivbachan Trivedi	Indian National Congress
1972	Sabhapati Singh	Samyukta Socialist Party
1977	Braj Kishor Narain Singh	Janata Party
1980	Braj Kishor Narain Singh	Janata Party
1985	Braj Kishor Narain Singh	Indian National Congress
1990	Braj Kishor Narain Singh	Indian National Congress
1995	Lal Babu Yadav	Janata Dal
1996^	Deo Dutt Prasad Yadav	Janata Dal
2000	Manjeet Kumar Singh	Samata Party
2005	Deo Dutt Prasad Yadav	Rashtriya Janata Dal
2005	Deo Dutt Prasad Yadav	Rashtriya Janata Dal
2010	Manjeet Kumar Singh	Janata Dal (United)
2015	Mithlesh Tiwari	Bharatiya Janata Party
2020	Prem Shankar Prasad	Rashtriya Janata Dal
2025	Mithlesh Tiwari	Bharatiya Janata Party

^ denotes by-polls

== Election results ==
In the 2020 state assembly election, Manjeet Kumar Singh In the 2015 state assembly elections, Mithlesh Tiwari of Bharatiya Janata Party won the Baikunthpur assembly seat defeating his nearest rival Manjeet Kumar Singh of Janata Dal (United). Contests in most years were multi cornered but only winners and runners up are being mentioned. In 2010 Manjeet Kumar Singh defeated Devdatt Prasad of Rashtriya Janata Dal by a big margin. Going past election Devdatt Prasad of RJD defeated Manjeet Kumar Singh of JD(U) in October 2005 and February 2005. Manjeet Kumar Singh of JD(U) defeated Lal Babu Prasad Yadav of RJD in 2000. Lal Babu Prasad Yadav of JD defeated former Bihar Cabinet Minister Braj Kishor Narayan Singh of Congress in 1995. Shri Braj Kishor Narayan Singh of Congress defeated Devdatt Prasad of JD in 1990 and Deodat Rai of LD in 1985. Braj Kishor Narayan Singh representing Janata Party (JP) defeated Deodat Rai of Janata Party (Secular – Charan Singh) in 1980. Braj Kishor Narayan Singh representing JP defeated Deonandan Singh of CPI in 1977.

=== 2025 ===
2025 Bihar Legislative Assembly election: Baikunthpur
Party	Candidate	Votes	%	±%
BJP	Mithilesh Tiwari	104,133	49.05	+18.1
RJD	Prem Shankar Prasad	87,180	41.07	+4.06
JSP	Ajay Prasad	7,335	3.46	
BSP	Pradeep Kumar	4,142	1.95	
Rashtrawadi Janlok Party (Satya)	Ram Narayan Singh	3,497	1.65	
Independent	Raj Kishor Singh	2,408	1.13	
NOTA	None of the above	2,018	0.95	−1.29
Majority		16,953	7.98	+1.92
Turnout		212,287	68.84	+11.13
BJP hold		Swing	NDA	

=== 2020 ===
Bihar Assembly election, 2020: Baikunthpur
Party	Candidate	Votes	%	±%
RJD	Prem Shankar Prasad	67,807	37.01	
BJP	Mithilesh Tiwari	56,694	30.95	−4.16
Independent	Manjeet Kumar Singh	43,354	23.67	
Independent	Rajendra Prasad	2,010	1.1	
NOTA	None of the above	4,097	2.24	−0.77
Majority		11,113	6.06	−2.76
Turnout		183,196	57.71	+0.93
RJD gain from BJP		Swing		

=== 2015 ===
2015 Bihar Legislative Assembly election: Baikunthpur
Party	Candidate	Votes	%	±%
BJP	Mithilesh Tiwari	56,162	35.11	
JD(U)	Manjeet Kumar Singh	42,047	26.29	
Independent	Manorma Devi	36,734	22.97	
BSP	Anup Kumar Tewari	3,735	2.34	
Independent	Gorakh Yadav	3,405	2.13	
Independent	Mohan Singh	3,055	1.91	
JAP(L)	Dinesh Singh	2,236	1.4	
Bhartiya New Sanskar Krantikari Party	Z. Rahman	2,103	1.31	
CPI	Krishna Vihari Prasad Yadav	1,866	1.17	
SP	Shaukat Ali	1,586	0.99	
NOTA	None of the above	4,813	3.01	
Majority		14,115	8.82	
Turnout		159,956	56.78	
Bhartiya New Sanskar Krantikari Party	Z. Rahman	2,103	1.31	
