= Basantpur Assembly constituency =

Coordinates: 26°15′12″N 84°36′27″E

Basantpur
- Former constituency No. 27 for the Bihar Legislative Assembly

Constituency details
- Country: India
- Region: East India
- State: Bihar
- District: Siwan
- Lok Sabha constituency: Maharajganj
- Established: 1957
- Abolished: 2010

Basantpur was a Bihar Legislative Assembly Constituency in Siwan district in the Indian state of Bihar. This Constituency was till 2010. In 2010, two blocks of Basantpur constituency were merged with Goreyakothi block and a new constituency was formed. Satyadeo Prasad Singh was Mla from this constituency From 2000 to 2005 and Manik Chandra Ray became Mla in 2005. From 1985 to 2010 the Main Contestors of this Constituency were Satyadeo Prasad Singh Of BJP and Manik Chandra Rai of RJD.

== Overview ==
It was part of Siwan Lok Sabha constituency.

As a consequence of the orders of the Delimitation Commission of India, Basantpur Assembly constituency ceased to exist in 2010.

== Members of Vidhan Sabha ==
Year	Member	Party
1957	Krishna Kant Singh (Note: Basantpur West)	Indian National Congress
1957	Sabhapati Singh (Note: Basantpur East)	Praja Socialist Party
1962	Jhulan Singh (Note: Basantpur West)	Indian National Congress
1962	Sabhapati Singh (Note: Basantpur East)	Praja Socialist Party
1967-77: Constituency defunct
1977	Vidya Bhaushan Singh	Janata Party
1980	Manik Chand Rai	Janata Party (Secular)
1985	Manik Chand Rai	Indian National Congress
1990	Manik Chand Rai	Indian National Congress
1995	Manik Chand Rai	Janata Dal
2000	Satyadeo Prasad Singh	Bharatiya Janata Party
2005	Satyadeo Prasad Singh	Bharatiya Janata Party
2005	Manik Chand Ray	Rashtriya Janata Dal
2010 onwards: Constituency doesn't exist
