= Parmanand =

Parmanand is a name. Notable people with the name include:

== People ==
- Parmanand Jha (born 1946), Nepali politician
- Parmanand Hinduja (1900–1971), Indian businessman
- Parmanand Rishideo (born 1962), Indian politician
- Parmanand Singh (born 1905), Indo-Fijian politician
- Babu Parmanand (1932–2008), Indian politician
- Bhagat Parmanand, Vaishnava mystic
- Parma Nand, Fijian-New Zealand doctor

== Other uses ==
- Bhai Parmanand Institute of Business Studies, college in India
