= Anand Shankar Singh =

Indian politician

Member of Bihar Legislative Assembly
- In office 2015–2025
- Preceded by: Ramadhar Singh
- Succeeded by: Trivikram Narayan Singh
- Constituency: Aurangabad, Bihar

Personal details
- Born: Aurangabad, Bihar
- Party: Indian National Congress
- Occupation: Politician

Anand Shankar Singh is an Indian politician and is currently a Member of Bihar Legislative Assembly in the 2015 & 2020 Bihar Legislative Assembly election from Aurangabad (Bihar Vidhan Sabha constituency) in Bihar.
