= Shashi Bhushan Singh =

Indian politician

Member of Bihar Legislative Assembly
- In office 2020–2025
- Preceded by: Ramchandra Sahani
- Succeeded by: Rajesh Kumar Gupta
- Constituency: Sugauli

Personal details
- Party: VIP
- Other political affiliations: RJD
- Occupation: Politician

Shashi Bhushan Singh is an Indian politician from Bihar and a former Member of the Bihar Legislative Assembly. He won the Sugauli Constituency on the RJD ticket in the 2020 Bihar Legislative Assembly election. And got ticket from VIP in 2025 Bihar Legislative Assembly election from the same seat but his nomination was rejected.
