= Kishunpur Assembly constituency =

Former constituency of the Bihar legislative assembly in India

Coordinates: 26°11′07″N 86°38′21″E

Kishunpur
- Former constituency for the Bihar Legislative Assembly

Constituency details
- Country: India
- Region: East India
- State: Bihar
- District: Supaul
- Established: 1977
- Abolished: 2008

Kishunpur Assembly constituency was an assembly constituency in Supaul district in the Indian state of Bihar.

As a consequence of the orders of the Delimitation Commission of India, Kishunpur Assembly constituency ceased to exist in 2010.

== Results ==
=== 1977–2005 ===
In October 2005 and February 2005 state assembly elections Aniruddha Prasad Yadav of JD(U) won the Kishunpur assembly seat defeating his nearest rival Vijay Kumar Gupta of Congress and Bijay Kumar Gupta of LJP respectively. Contests in most years were multi cornered but only winners and runners are being mentioned. Yaduwansh Kumar Yadav of RJD defeated Vijay Kumar Gupta of Congress in 2000. Vijay Kumar Gupta of Congress defeated Vinayak Prasad Yadav of JD in 1995. Vinayak Prasad Yadav of JD defeated Yaduvans Kumar Yadav of Congress. Vishwanath Gurmaita of Congress defeated Vinayak Prasad Yadav of LD in 1985 and Yadubans Kumar Yadav of Janata Party (Secular – Charan Singh) in 1980. Baidyanath Mehta of JP defeated Yamuna Prasad Mandal of Congress in 1977.
