= Mithilesh Tiwari =

Indian politician

Minister of Education Government of Bihar
- Incumbent
- Assumed office 7 May 2026
- Chief Minister: Samrat Choudhary
- Preceded by: Vijay Kumar Chaudhary

Member of Bihar Legislative Assembly
- Incumbent
- Assumed office 2025
- Preceded by: Prem Shankar Prasad
- Constituency: Baikunthpur
- In office 2015–2020
- Preceded by: Manjeet Kumar Singh
- Succeeded by: Prem Shankar Prasad
- Constituency: Baikunthpur

Personal details
- Born: 29 December 1971 (age 54) Dumaria, Gopalganj district, India
- Party: Bharatiya Janata Party
- Spouse: Savita Devi
- Children: 1 son, 1 daughter
- Parent: Dev Narayan Tiwari (father)
- Education: B.A. (Economics)

Mithlesh Tiwari is an Indian politician. He was elected to the Bihar Legislative Assembly from Baikunthpur constituency of Bihar in the 2015 Bihar Legislative Assembly election as a member of the Bharatiya Janata Party. He is currently serving as Education Minister of Bihar.
