= Raghopur, Supaul Assembly constituency =

Former Assembly constituency in Bihar, India

Coordinates: 26°16′22″N 86°50′46″E

Raghopur
- Former constituency for the Bihar Legislative Assembly

Constituency details
- Country: India
- Region: East India
- State: Bihar
- District: Supaul
- Established: 1951
- Abolished: 2008

Raghopur or Raghopur-Supaul (Supaul Dist) Vidhan Sabha constituency was an assembly constituency in Supaul district in the Indian state of Bihar.

As a consequence of the orders of the Delimitation Commission of India, this seat ceased to exist in 2010. But Bihar continues have another constituency by the same name.

== Members of Vidhan Sabha ==
Election	Name of the Member	Political Party
1951	-	-
1957	-	-
1962	-	-
1967	A Goit	Socialist Party
1969	-	-
1972	-	-
1977	Aseshwar Goit	Janata Party
1980	Amrendra Mishra	Indian National Congress (Indira)
1985	Amrendra Mishra	Indian National Congress
1990	Amrendra Mishra	Indian National Congress
1995	Lakhan Thakur	Janata Dal
2000	Uday Prakash Goit	Rashtriya Janata Dal
2005 (Feb)	Neeraj Kumar Singh (Bablu)	Janata Dal (United)
2005 (Oct)	Neeraj Kumar Singh (Bablu)	Janata Dal (United)
2010 onwards	Seat does not exist	

== Election results ==
=== 1967 Vidhan Sabha ===
- A. Goit (SSP): 21,967 votes
- B.P. Mehta (INC): 17,918 votes

=== 1977-2004 ===
In the October 2005 and February 2005 state assembly elections, Niraj Kumar Singh Bablu of Janata Dal (United) won the Raghopur assembly seat defeating his nearest rivals Jai Vardhan Yadav of Congress and Md. Zeayuddin of Bahujan Samaj Party, respectively. Contests in most years were multi cornered but only winners and runners are being mentioned. Uday Prakash Goit of Rashtriya Janata Dal defeated Lakhan Thakur of JD(U) in 2000. Lakhan Thakur of Janata Dal defeated Amarendra Mishra of Congress in 1995. Amarendra Mishra of Congress defeated Udai Prakash Goit of Janata Dal in 1990, Aseshwar Goit of Lok Dal in 1985 and Kumar Sashindra Singh, Independent, in 1980. Asehswar Goit of Janata Party defeated Amarendra Mishra of Congress in 1977.

=== February 2005 Vidhan Sabha ===
- Niraj Kumar Singh 'Bablu' (JD-U): 27,601 votes
- Zeyauddin (BSP)

=== October 2005 Vidhan Sabha ===
- Niraj Kumar Singh 'Bablu' (JD-U): 45,079 votes
- Jai Vardhan Yadav (INC): 25,691
- Zeyauddin (BSP)
