= Aurangabad, Bihar Assembly constituency =

Assembly constituency in Bihar, India

Coordinates: 24.75°N 84.37°E

Aurangabad Assembly constituency
- Constituency No. 223 for the Bihar Legislative Assembly

Constituency details
- Country: India
- Region: East India
- State: Bihar
- District: Aurangabad
- Lok Sabha constituency: Aurangabad
- Established: 1973
- Total electors: 312,764

Member of Legislative Assembly
- 18th Bihar Legislative Assembly
- Incumbent Trivikram Narayan Singh
- Party: BJP
- Alliance: NDA
- Elected year: 2025

Aurangabad Assembly constituency is an assembly constituency for Bihar Legislative Assembly in Aurangabad district, Bihar. It comes under Aurangabad (Bihar Lok Sabha constituency). On 26 January 1973, Aurangabad district, Bihar was created (government notification number 07/11-2071-72 dated 19 January 1973).

Before Anand Shankar Singh, Ramdhar Singh from BJP was MLA from this constituency.

== Members of Legislative Assembly ==
Year	Name	Party
1952	Priyabrat Narain Singh	Indian National Congress
1957	Priyabrat Narain Singh	Indian National Congress
1962	Brij Mohan Singh	Swatantra Party
1967	Saryoo Singh	Praja Socialist Party
1969	Saryoo Singh	Praja Socialist Party
1972	Brij Mohan Singh	Indian National Congress
1977	Ram Naresh Singh	Indian National Congress
1980	Ram Naresh Singh	Independent politician
1985	Brij Mohan Singh	Indian National Congress
1990	Brij Mohan Singh	Indian National Congress
1995	Ramadhar Singh	Bharatiya Janata Party
2000	Suresh Mehta	Rashtriya Janata Dal
2005	Ramadhar Singh	Bharatiya Janata Party
2005	Ramadhar Singh	Bharatiya Janata Party
2010	Ramadhar Singh	Bharatiya Janata Party
2015	Anand Shankar Singh	Indian National Congress
2020	Anand Shankar Singh	Indian National Congress
2025	Trivikram Singh	Bharatiya Janata Party

== Election results ==
=== 2025 ===
Bihar Assembly election, 2025: Aurangabad
Party	Candidate	Votes	%	±%
BJP	Trivikram Narayan Singh	87,200	43.38	+3.43
INC	Anand Shankar Singh	80,406	40.0	−1.27
BSP	Shakti Kumar Mishra	19,776	9.84	−1.03
Independent	Surendra Prasad	2,854	1.42	
JSP	Nand Kishor Yadav	2,755	1.37	
NOTA	None of the above	3,352	1.67	+0.21
Majority		6,794	3.38	+2.06
Turnout		200,994	64.26	+10.9
BJP gain from INC		Swing		

=== 2020 ===
Bihar Assembly election, 2020: Aurangabad
Party	Candidate	Votes	%	±%
INC	Anand Shankar Singh	70,018	41.27	▼0.43
BJP	Ramadhar Singh	67,775	39.95	▲10.31
BSP	Anil Kumar	18,444	10.87	▲0.87
Independent	Sanjiv Kumar Singh	2,610	1.54	
BMP	Suresh Prasad	2,366	1.39	▲0.73
JAP(L)	Chandesh Pd Gupta	2,254	1.33	▼1.04
Pragatisheel Magahi Samaj	Archana Devi	1,614	0.95	
NOTA	None of the above	2,484	1.46	▲0.86
Majority		2,243	1.32	▼10.74
Turnout		169,654	53.36	▲0.4
INC hold		Swing		

=== 2015 ===
2015 Bihar Legislative Assembly election: Aurangabad
Party	Candidate	Votes	%	±%
INC	Anand Shankar Singh	63,637	41.7	
BJP	Ramadhar Singh	45,239	29.64	
BSP	Kaushal Singh	15,260	10.0	
Independent	Kumar Gaurav	5,978	3.92	
JAP(L)	Sanjit Kumar Chourasia	3,623	2.37	
Independent	Ram Chandar Yadav	3,013	1.97	
CPI	Sinesh Rahi	2,714	1.78	
Independent	Vikram Kumar	1,811	1.19	
Independent	Satyendra Singh	1,702	1.12	
NOTA	None of the above	910	0.6	
Majority		18,398	12.06	
Turnout		152,603	52.96	
