= Dighwa Dubauli =

Dighwa Dubauli refers to a locality village in Gopalganj district of Bihar in India. There is a railway station with the same name and also a market. The market is the biggest one in the neighboring areas and draws people from remote villages, like Reotith, Sirsa, shanker pur, Sirsa Manpur, Dighwa, Bankati, Pipra, Bijulpur to name a few.

== Education ==
Dighwa Dubauli has two major high schools, Reotith High School and Sirsa high school. There are many private schools that offer good education up to elementary level. Dighwa Dubauli is also famous as an industrial training hub due to two industrial training institutes namely RN Private ITI and Yogendra Singh ITI.

== Transport ==
Dighwa Dubauli is well connected through railway to major towns like Gopalganj and Chapra. The train service at the moment is not good because only 4 trains pass this station in 24 hour period. There are many private buses too that connect the town to Patna, Muzaffarpur, etc. There are auto service offered for reaching villages nearby.

== Police station ==
Baikunthpur police station is very close to the railway station.

== Nearby villages ==
Nearby villages consist of Khajuhatti, Reotith, Sirsa, Manpur Dighwa, Bankati, Pipra, Bijulpur, Maharani, Usari, Mahua, Sabili, and Singasani Dham, Chiutahan, safiyabad, sisai etc.

== Market ==
The market in Dighwa Dubauli is well known and attended by many villagers. Almost everything is available in the market. The market is open until 9 pm. Reotith market is also good market near the area. Reotith is in near South Bankatti village.
