= Neeraj Kumar Singh Bablu =

Indian politician based in Bihar

Neeraj Kumar Singh
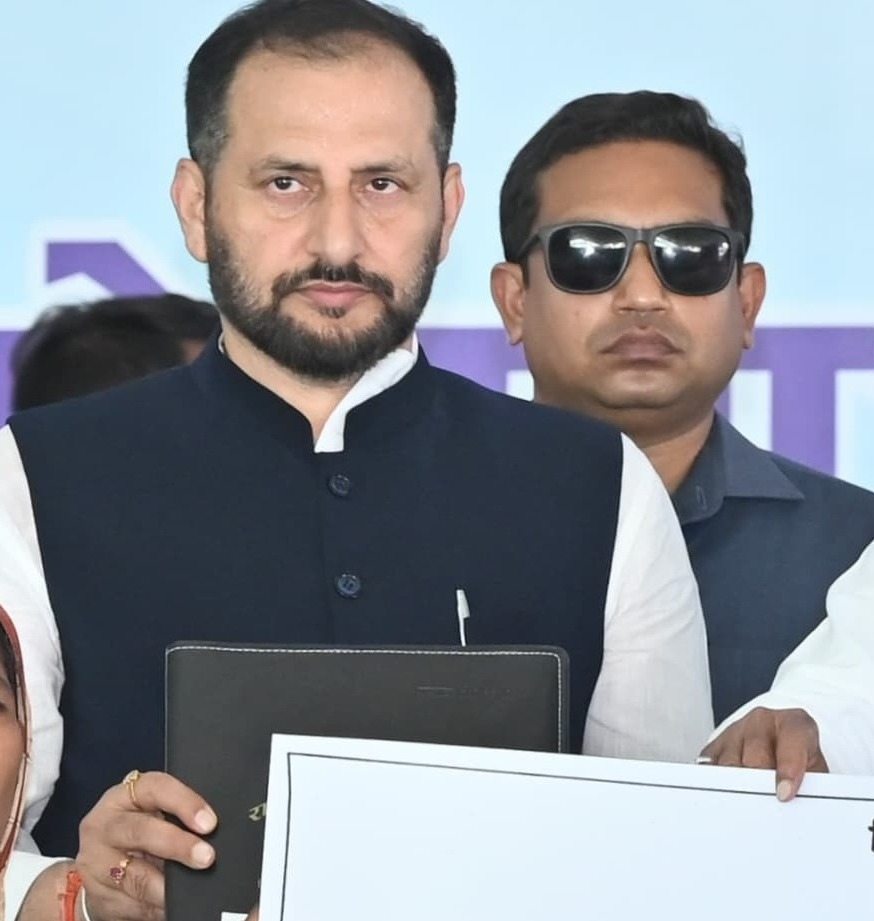

Minister of Public Health Engineering Government of Bihar
- In office 15 March 2024 – 20 November 2025
- Chief Minister: Nitish Kumar
- Preceded by: Nitish Kumar
- Succeeded by: Sanjay Kumar Singh

Member of Bihar Legislative Assembly
- Incumbent
- Assumed office Nov 2010
- Preceded by: Vishwa Mohan Bharti
- Constituency: Chhatapur
- In office Feb 2005 – Nov 2010
- Preceded by: Uday Prakash Goit
- Succeeded by: Constituency abolished
- Constituency: Raghopur (Supaul)

Personal details
- Born: 2 February 1969 (age 57) Maldiha, Purnia, Bihar
- Party: Bharatiya Janata Party
- Other political affiliations: Janata Dal (United) (until 2015)
- Spouse: Nutan Singh
- Children: 2
- Parent: Ram Kishor Singh (father)
- Relatives: Sushant Singh Rajput (cousin)
- Education: B.Sc
- Profession: Agriculture

Neeraj Kumar Singh alias Bablu (born 1969) is an Indian politician who is serving as a Member of the Bihar Legislative Assembly from the Chhatapur representing the Bharatiya Janata Party. He became Minister of Environment and Forest in Seventh Nitish Kumar ministry on February 9, 2021.

== Early life and education ==
Bablu was born 2 February 1969 in Maldiha village in the Purnia district of Bihar to his father Ram Kishor Singh. He is married to Nootan Singh, they have two sons. He belongs to the General Class Rajput community. He holds a Bachelor of Applied Science degree.

He is the cousin of the famous Bollywood actor Sushant Singh Rajput, who died in June 2020.

== Political career ==
He stepped in politics earlier but has come into action in 2005 as a member of Janata Dal (United) by defeating Uday Kumar Goit from Raghopur-Supaul Constituency which he served till its delimitation in Bihar Vidhan Sabha. In 2010 he was elected from Chhatapur (Vidhan Sabha constituency). Later he quit JD-U and joined BJP. He was elected to Vidhan Sabha from Chhatarpur as member of BJP in 2015 and 2020 and 2025.
