= Sugauli Assembly constituency =

Coordinates: 26°47′N 84°44′E

Sugauli
- Constituency No. 11 for the Bihar Legislative Assembly

Constituency details
- Country: India
- Region: East India
- State: Bihar
- District: East Champaran
- Lok Sabha constituency: Paschim Champaran
- Established: 1951
- Total electors: 283,696
- Reservation: None

Member of Legislative Assembly
- 18th Bihar Legislative Assembly
- Incumbent Rajesh Kumar Gupta
- Party: LJP(RV)
- Alliance: NDA
- Elected year: 2025
- Preceded by: Ramchandra Sahani

Sugauli Assembly constituency is an assembly constituency in East Champaran district in the Indian state of Bihar. It is located District entry point 60.3 kilometres Northeast Old Morden City Mehsi. 19.2 kilometres north of the District headquarter Motihari.

== Overview ==
As per orders of Delimitation of Parliamentary and Assembly constituencies Order, 2008, 11. Sugauli Assembly constituency is composed of the following: Sugauli and Ramgarhwa community development blocks.

Sugauli Assembly constituency is part of 2. Paschim Champaran (Lok Sabha constituency). It was earlier part of Bettiah (Lok Sabha constituency).

== Members of the Legislative Assembly ==
Year	Name	Party
1952	Jai Narain Prasad	Indian National Congress
1962	Bidya Kishore Bidyalankar	Indian National Congress
1967	M.L. Modi	Bharatiya Jana Sangh
1969	Badari Narayan Jha	Indian National Congress
1972	Azizul Haque	Socialist Party
1977	Ramashray Singh	Communist Party of India (Marxist)
1980	Ramashray Singh	Communist Party of India (Marxist)
1985	Suresh Kumar Mishra	Indian National Congress
1990	Ramashray Singh	Communist Party of India (Marxist)
1995	Chandra Shekhar Dwiwedi	Independent
2000	Vijay Prasad Gupta	Kosal Party
2005	Vijay Prasad Gupta	Rashtriya Janata Dal
2005	Ramchandra Sahani	Bharatiya Janata Party
2010	Ramchandra Sahani	Bharatiya Janata Party
2015	Ramchandra Sahani	Bharatiya Janata Party
2020	Shashi Bhushan Singh	Rashtriya Janata Dal
2025	Rajesh Kumar Gupta	Lok Janshakti Party (Ram Vilas)

== Election results ==
=== 2025 ===
2025 Bihar Legislative Assembly election: Sugauli
Party	Candidate	Votes	%	±%
LJP(RV)	Rajesh Kumar Gupta	98,875	49.74	
JJD	Shyam Kishor Chaudhary	40,684	20.47	
BSP	Zulfiquar Aftab	25,036	12.59	
JSP	Ajay Kumar Jha	24,718	12.43	
Kisan Suraj Dal	Jitendra Tiwari	4,250	2.14	
NOTA	None of the above	5,227	2.63	▲1.34
Majority		58,191	29.27	▲27.25
Turnout		198,790	70.07	▲10.73
LJP(RV) gain from RJD		Swing	11.48	

=== 2020 ===
2020 Bihar Legislative Assembly election: Sugauli
Party	Candidate	Votes	%	±%
RJD	Shashi Bhushan Singh	65,267	38.26	▲3.13
VIP	Ramchandra Sahani	61,820	36.24	
LJP	Vijay Prasad Gupta	14,188	8.32	
RLSP	Sant Singh Kushwaha	6,710	3.93	
AIMF	Sadre Alam	3,431	2.01	
Jago Hindustan Party	Vinod Kumar Mahto	2,499	1.46	
Independent	Akhilesh Kumar Mishra	2,393	1.4	
Jan Sangharsh Dal	Shekh Alauddin	1,973	1.16	
Independent	Shekh Manjar Hussain	1,970	1.15	
Independent	Amrit Raj	1,854	1.09	
Independent	Vishnu Prasad Gupta	1,558	0.91	
Janta Dal Rashtravadi	Zulfiquar Aftab	1,550	0.91	
NOTA	None of the above	2,193	1.29	▼0.33
Majority		3,447	2.02	▼2.97
Turnout		170,583	59.34	▼0.5
RJD gain from BJP		Swing		

=== 2015 ===
2015 Bihar Legislative Assembly election: Sugauli
Party	Candidate	Votes	%	±%
BJP	Ramchandra Sahani	62,384	40.12	
RJD	Om Prakash Choudhary	54,628	35.13	
Independent	Shashi Bhushan Singh	15,004	9.65	
Independent	Ram Gopal	6,950	4.47	
CPI	Radha Mohan Singh	4,335	2.79	
CPI(M)	Madan Mohan Yadav	2,666	1.71	
NOTA	None of the above	2,523	1.62	
Majority		7,756	4.99	
Turnout		155,495	59.84	
BJP hold		Swing		

=== 2010 ===
2010 Bihar Legislative Assembly election: Sugauli
Party	Candidate	Votes	%	±%
BJP	Ramchandra Sahani	39,021	34.42	
RJD	Vijay Prasad Gupta	26,642	23.50	
INC	Mahammed Umar	10,922	9.63	
Independent	Arjun Singh	10,697	9.44	
Majority		12,379	10.92	
Turnout		1,13,367	55.32	
BJP hold		Swing		
