= Dumar Lal Baitha =

Indian politician

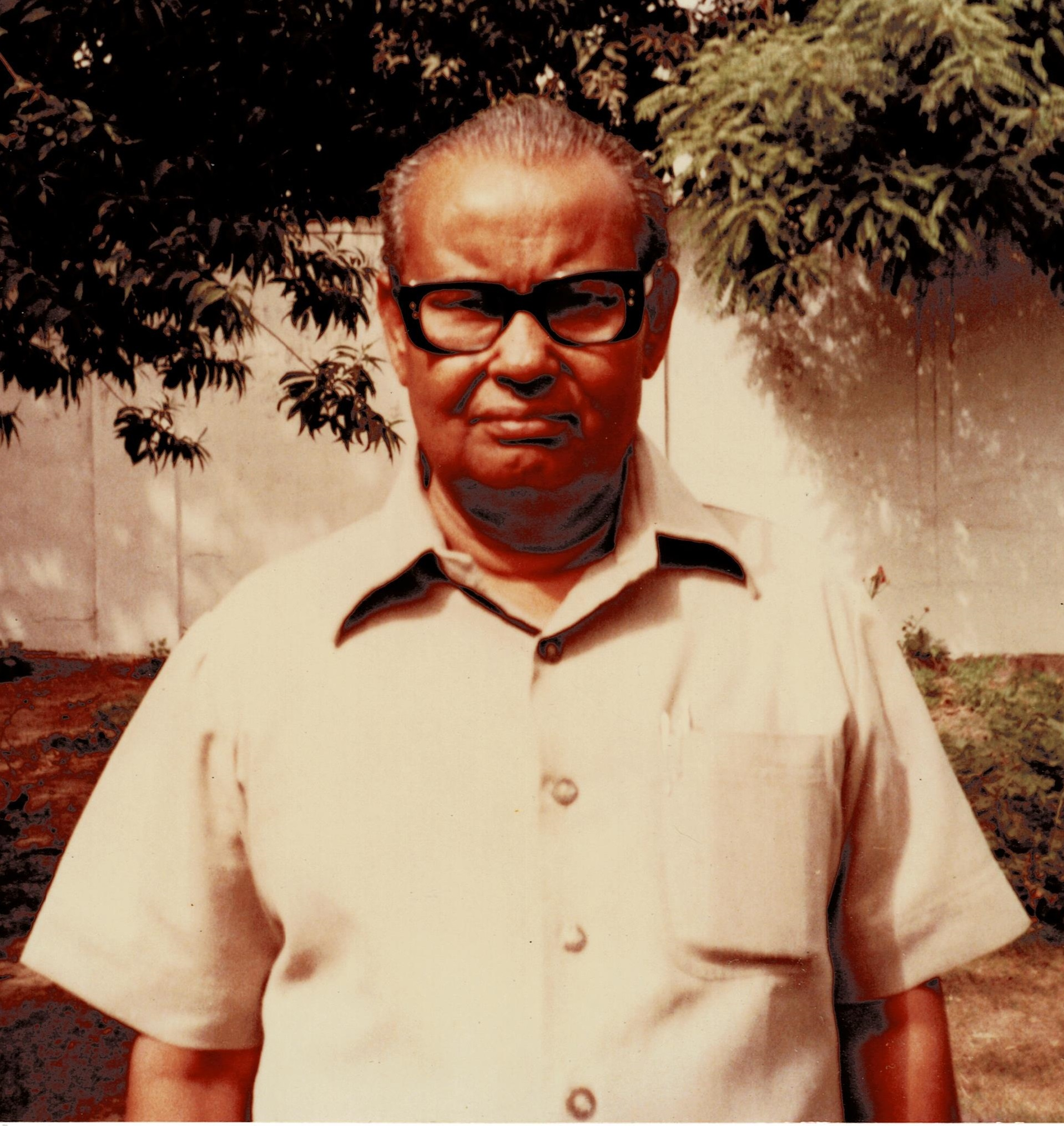

Union Minister of State for Defence
- In office 4 July 1989 – 2 December 1989
- Prime Minister: Rajiv Gandhi
- Preceded by: Chintamani Panigrahi
- Succeeded by: Raja Ramanna

Deputy Minister for Food and Civil Supplies
- In office 14 February 1988 – 4 July 1989

Member of Parliament, Lok Sabha
- In office 21 January 1980 – 27 November 1989
- Preceded by: Mahendra Narayan Sardar
- Succeeded by: Sukdeo Paswan
- Constituency: Araria, Bihar

President, Bihar Pradesh Congress Committee
- In office 1985-1988
- Preceded by: Bindeshwari Dubey
- Succeeded by: Tariq Anwar

Member of Bihar Legislative Assembly
- In office 20 May 1952 – 28 March 1972
- Constituency: Narpatganj-cum-Dharhara; Forbesganj; Narpatganj; Raniganj

Personal details
- Born: January 1, 1924 Balua Kaliaganj, Araria Sub Division, Purnia District, Bihar, British India
- Died: February 10, 1997 Dr. Ram Manohar Lohia Hospital
- Party: Indian National Congress
- Spouse: Abharani Devi

Dumar Lal Baitha (1924-1997) was an Indian politician, agriculturist and lawyer. He was elected to the Lower House of the Indian Parliament, the Lok Sabha, from Araria, Bihar as a member of the Indian National Congress.

== Personal life and death ==
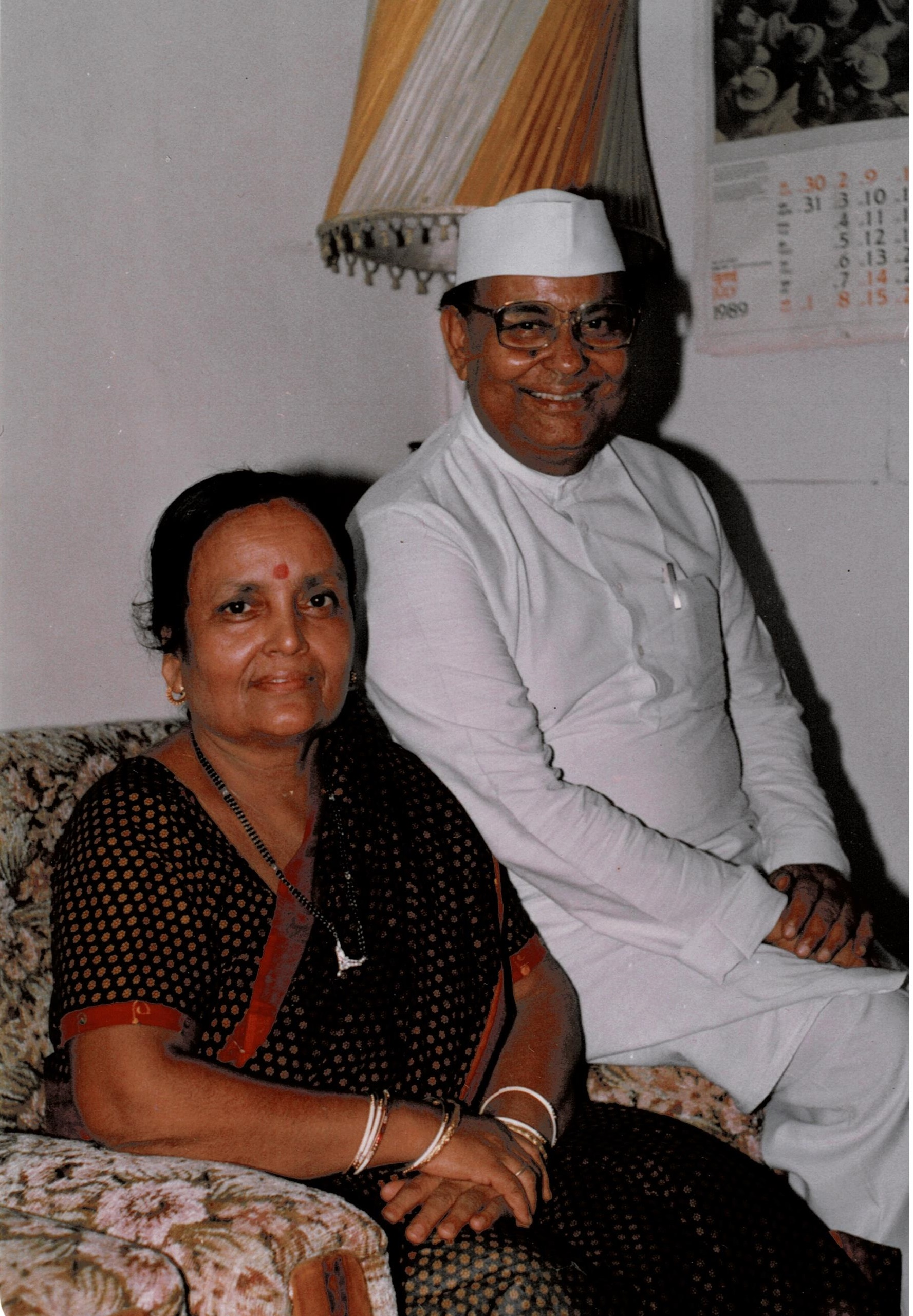
Baitha and his wife in 1989

He married Abharani Devi.

He died at Dr. Ram Manohar Lohia Hospital on 10 February 1997.
