= Trivikram Narayan Singh =

Indian politician

Member of Bihar Legislative Assembly
- Incumbent
- Assumed office 2025
- Preceded by: Anand Shankar Singh
- Constituency: Aurangabad

State Secretary of Bharatiya Janata Party – Bihar
- Incumbent
- Assumed office 9 August 2023
- President: Samrat Choudhary; Dilip Jaiswal

Personal details
- Party: Bharatiya Janata Party
- Profession: Politician

Trivikram Narayan Singh is an Indian politician from Bihar. He is elected as a Member of Legislative Assembly in 2025 Bihar Legislative Assembly election from Aurangabad constituency. He was appointed as State Secretary of Bharatiya Janata Party – Bihar on 9 August 2023 under the Presidency of Samrat Choudhary.
