= Bharat Bind =

Indian politician (born 1958)

Bharat Bind (born 15 May 1958) is an Indian politician from Bihar. He is an MLA from Bhabua Assembly constituency in Kaimur District. He won the 2020 Bihar Legislative Assembly election representing Rashtriya Janata Dal.

== Early life and education ==
Bind is from Chainpur, Kaimur District, Bihar. His father Ramdhani Bind is a farmer. He completed his Class 10 at Bahudeshiya High School, Ramgarh, Kaimur.

== Career ==
Bind won from Bhabua Assembly constituency representing Rashtriya Janata Dal in the 2020 Bihar Legislative Assembly election. He polled 57,561 votes and defeated his nearest rival, Rinki Rani Pandey of Bharatiya Janata Party, by a margin of 10,045 votes. Earlier, he lost the 2015 Bihar Legislative Assembly election, coming third behind winner Anand Bhushan Pandey of BJP who defeated Janata Dal's Pramod Kumar Singh by 7,744 votes. Contesting on BSP ticket, Bind polled 29,983 votes behind the top two.
