= Ram Lal Singh =

Indian politician (died 2019)

MLA of Bhabua
- In office 1985–1990
- Preceded by: Shyam Narayan Pandey
- Succeeded by: Vijay Shankar Pandey
- In office 1995–2000
- Preceded by: Vijay Shankar Pandey
- Succeeded by: Pramod Singh

Personal details
- Born: 1928 / 1929 (exact date not known)
- Died: 28 February 2019
- Party: Communist Party of India

Ram Lal Singh was an Indian politician representing the Communist Party of India. In both 1985 and 1995, he was elected as a member of the Bihar Legislative Assembly from Bhabua. He died on 28 February 2019 at the age of 90.
