= Sukdeo Paswan =

Indian politician

Member of Parliament, Lok Sabha
- In office 20 October 1999 – 18 May 2009
- Preceded by: Ramji Das Rishidev
- Succeeded by: Pradeep Kumar Singh
- Constituency: Araria
- In office 2 December 1989 – 4 December 1997
- Preceded by: Dumar Lal Baitha
- Succeeded by: Ramji Das Rishidev
- Constituency: Araria

Personal details
- Born: 5 November 1953 (age 72) Araria, Bihar
- Party: Lok Janshakti Party
- Other political affiliations: Janata Dal; Rashtriya Janata Dal; Bharatiya Janata Party; Indian National Congress
- Spouse: Neelam Paswan
- Children: 4
- As of 26 September, 2006

Sukhdeo Paswan (born 5 November 1953) is an Indian politician. He is a five-term Member of Parliament from the Araria constituency of Bihar. He was last an MP in the 14th Lok Sabha of India as a member of the Bharatiya Janata Party. In July 2010, he joined the Lok Janshakti Party.
