= Devesh Kant Singh =

Indian politician (born 1968)

Devesh Kant Singh (born 8 August 1968) is an Indian politician from Bihar. He is an MLA from Goriakothi Assembly constituency in Siwan District. He won the 2020 and 2025 Bihar Legislative Assembly election representing Bharatiya Janata Party.

== Early life and education ==
Singh is from Goriakothi, Siwan District, Bihar. He is the son of Bhumendra Narayan Singh, a two time MLA from Goriakothi constituency for BJP. He completed his graduation in 1988 at Patna from a college affiliated with Patna University.

== Career ==
Singh won from Goriakothi Assembly constituency in Siwan district in the 2025 and 2020 Bihar Legislative Assembly Election representing Bharatiya Janata Party. In 2020 he defeated his nearest rival, Nutan Devi of the RJD, by a margin of 11,891 votes.

Singh lost the 2015 Bihar Legislative Assembly election to Satyadeo Prasad Singh of RJD by 7000 votes.
