= Goriakothi Assembly constituency =

Coordinates: 26°15′12″N 84°36′27″E

Goreyakothi
- Constituency No. 111 for the Bihar Legislative Assembly

Constituency details
- Country: India
- Region: East India
- State: Bihar
- District: Siwan
- Lok Sabha constituency: Maharajganj
- Established: 1967
- Total electors: 331,190

Member of Legislative Assembly
- 18th Bihar Legislative Assembly
- Incumbent Devesh Kant Singh
- Elected year: 2025
- Preceded by: Satyadeo Prasad Singh

Goreyakothi is a Bihar Legislative Assembly Constituency in Siwan district in the Indian state of Bihar. This constituency was formed in 2010 after two blocks of Basantpur constituency were merged with Goreyakothi block and a new constituency was formed. Bhumendra Narayan Singh was the first MLA of this newly formed Goriakothi assembly seat in 2010. Satyadeo Prasad Singh was MLA from this constituency from 2015 to 2020 and Deveshkant Singh became MLA in 2020.

== Overview ==
As per Delimitation of Parliamentary and Assembly constituencies Order, 2008, No. 111 Goriakothi Assembly constituency is composed of the following: Goriakothi, Lakri Nabiganj and Basantpur. community development blocks.

Goriakothi Assembly constituency is part of No. 19 Maharajganj (Lok Sabha constituency).

== Members of the Legislative Assembly ==
Year	Name	Party
1967	Krishna Kant Singh	Indian National Congress
1969	Krishna Kant Singh	Lok Tantrik Congress
1972	Mahamaya Prasad	Indian National Congress
1977	Krishna Kant Singh	Indian National Congress
1980	Ajit Kumar Singh	Indian National Congress
1985	Indra Deo Prasad	Bharatiya Janata Party
1990	Ajit Kumar Singh	Janata Dal
1995	Indra Deo Prasad	Janata Dal
2000	Indra Deo Prasad	Rashtriya Janata Dal
2005	Bhumendra Narayan Singh	Bharatiya Janata Party
2005	Indra Deo Prasad	Rashtriya Janata Dal
2010	Bhumendra Narayan Singh	Bharatiya Janata Party
2015	Satyadeo Prasad Singh	Rashtriya Janata Dal
2020	Devesh Kant Singh	Bharatiya Janata Party
2025	Devesh Kant Singh	Bharatiya Janata Party

== Election results ==
=== 2025 ===
2025 Bihar Legislative Assembly election: Goriakothi
Party	Candidate	Votes	%	±%
BJP	Devesh Kant Singh	105,909	49.64	+3.98
RJD	Anwarul Haque	93,524	43.84	+4.39
JSP	Ejaz Ahmad Siddique	3,281	1.54	
Independent	Ashok Kumar Varma	2,797	1.31	−0.83
NOTA	None of the above	3,655	1.71	+1.12
Majority		12,385	5.8	−0.41
Turnout		213,345	64.42	+6.62
BJP hold		Swing		

=== 2020 ===
Bihar Assembly election, 2020: Goriakothi
Party	Candidate	Votes	%	±%
BJP	Devesh Kant Singh	87,368	45.66	▲7.52
RJD	Nutan devi	75,477	39.45	▼3.3
Independent	Aravind Kumar Singh	5,223	2.73	
Independent	Ashok Kumar Varma	4,104	2.14	
Independent	Kaunain Ahamad	3,136	1.64	
Independent	Anup Kumar Tewari	2,377	1.24	
JAP(L)	Premchand Singh	1,767	0.92	
NOTA	None of the above	1,121	0.59	▼0.79
Majority		11,891	6.21	▲1.6
Turnout		191,341	57.8	▲2.45
BJP gain from RJD		Swing		

=== 2015 ===
2015 Bihar Legislative Assembly election: Goriakothi
Party	Candidate	Votes	%	±%
RJD	Satyadeo Prasad Singh	70,965	42.75	
BJP	Devesh Kant Singh	63,314	38.14	
Independent	Tribhuwan Ram	5,230	3.15	
Independent	Renu Yadav	4,016	2.42	
Independent	Ashok Kumar Singh	3,060	1.84	
CPI	Tarkeshwar Yadav	2,921	1.76	
Independent	Lal Babu Sharma	2,890	1.74	
BSP	Raj Kapur Prasad Yadav	2,010	1.21	
Independent	Chandrama Sah	1,581	0.95	
Independent	Ramayan Singh	1,575	0.95	
Independent	Uma Shankar Tiwari	1,530	0.92	
NOTA	None of the above	2,296	1.38	
Majority		7,651	4.61	
Turnout		166,010	55.35	
