= Bhabua Assembly constituency =

Constituency of the Bihar legislative assembly in India

Coordinates: 25.04°N 83.61°E

Bhabua
- Constituency No. 205 for the Bihar Legislative Assembly

Constituency details
- Country: India
- Region: East India
- State: Bihar
- District: Kaimur
- Lok Sabha constituency: Sasaram
- Established: 1957
- Reservation: None

Member of Legislative Assembly
- 18th Bihar Legislative Assembly
- Incumbent Bharat Bind
- Party: BJP
- Alliance: NDA
- Elected year: 2025

Bhabua is one of 243 constituencies of legislative assembly of Bihar. It comes under Sasaram Lok Sabha constituency.

== Overview ==
Bhabua comprises Community Blocks of Bhabua & Rampur. The constituency has a preponderance of voters belonging to Koeri and Kurmi caste. The Brahmins and Kayasthas stand second only to the twin caste of Koeri-Kurmi in population, in this constituency.

== Members of the Legislative Assembly ==
Year	Member	Party
1957	Dular Chand Ram	Indian National Congress
1957	Aliwaris Khan	Indian National Congress
1962	Shyam Narain Pandey	Indian National Congress
1967	Shyam Narain Pandey	Indian National Congress
1969	Chandramauli Mishra	Bharatiya Jana Sangh
1972	Shyam Narayan Pandey	Indian National Congress
1977	Shib Pariksha Singh	Janata Party
1980	Shyam Narayan Pandey	Indian National Congress
1985	Ram Lal Singh	Communist Party of India
1990	Vijay Shankar Pandey	Indian National Congress
1995	Ram Lal Singh	Communist Party of India
2000	Pramod Kumar Singh	Rashtriya Janata Dal
2005	Pramod Kumar Singh	Rashtriya Janata Dal
2005	Ram Chandra Yadav	Bahujan Samaj Party
2010	Pramod Kumar Singh	Lok Janshakti Party
2015	Anand Bhushan Pandey	Bharatiya Janata Party
2018^	Rinki Rani Pandey	Bharatiya Janata Party
2020	Bharat Bind	Rashtriya Janata Dal
2025	Bharat Bind	Bharatiya Janata Party

== Election results ==
=== 2025 ===
2025 Bihar Legislative Assembly election: Bhabua
Party	Candidate	Votes	%	±%
BJP	Bharat Bind	80,039	41.48	+14.26
RJD	Birendra Kumar Singh	55,624	28.83	−4.15
BSP	Vikash Singh	39,711	20.58	
JSP	Jainendra Kumar Arya	6,775	3.51	
RLJP	Vikash Kumar Tiwari	6,244	3.24	
NOTA	None of the above	1,927	1.0	−1.1
Majority		24,415	12.65	+6.89
Turnout		192,958	68.78	+5.25
BJP hold		Swing		

=== 2020 ===
2020 Bihar Legislative Assembly election: Bhabua
Party	Candidate	Votes	%	±%
RJD	Bharat Bind	57,561	32.98	
BJP	Rinki Rani Pandey	47,516	27.22	−7.37
RLSP	Birendra Kumar Singh Kushwaha	37,014	21.21	
Independent	Doctor Pramod Kumar Singh	20,639	11.83	
NOTA	None of the above	3,671	2.1	+1.66
Majority		10,045	5.76	+0.49
Turnout		174,534	63.53	+3.85
RJD gain from BJP		Swing		

=== 2015 ===
2015 Bihar Legislative Assembly election: Bhabua
Party	Candidate	Votes	%	±%
BJP	Anand Bhushan Pandey	50,768	34.59	
JD(U)	Pramod Kumar Singh	43,024	29.32	
BSP	Bharat Bind	29,983	20.43	
SS	Sanjay Sinha	4,857	3.31	
Independent	Vikash Singh	3,192	2.17	
Independent	Jagmohan Pal	2,276	1.55	
SP	Nitu Singh Yadav	1,991	1.36	
CPI	Balram Chaubey	1,896	1.29	
NOTA	None of the above	642	0.44	
Majority		7,744	5.27	
Turnout		146,759	59.68	
BJP gain from RJD		Swing	{{{swing}}}	

== See also ==
- List of constituencies of Bihar Legislative Assembly
