= Chhatapur Assembly constituency =

Assembly constituency in Bihar, India

Coordinates: 26°11′56″N 87°00′18″E

Chhatapur
- Constituency No. 45 for the Bihar Legislative Assembly

Constituency details
- Country: India
- Region: East India
- State: Bihar
- District: Supaul
- Established: 1967
- Total electors: 301,120
- Reservation: None

Member of Legislative Assembly
- 18th Bihar Legislative Assembly
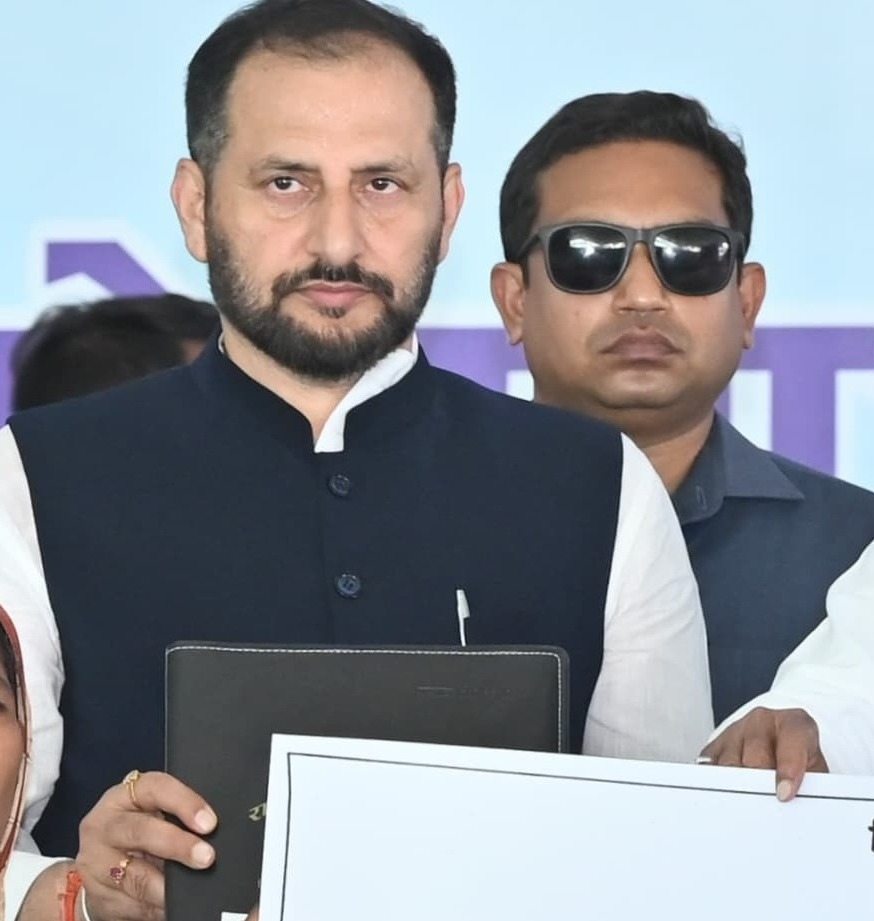
- Incumbent Neeraj Kumar Singh
- Party: BJP
- Alliance: NDA
- Elected year: 2025
- Preceded by: Vishwa Mohan Bharti JD(U)

Chhatapur Assembly constituency is an assembly constituency in Supaul district in the Indian state of Bihar. It has been an open seat since 2010, but earlier it was reserved for Scheduled Castes. There are a total of 23 gram panchayat under the Chhatapur block.

== Overview ==
As per Delimitation of Parliamentary and Assembly constituencies Order, 2008, No. 45 Chhatapur Assembly constituency is composed of the following: Chhatapur and Basantpur community development blocks.

Chhatapur Assembly constituency is part of No. 8 Supaul (Lok Sabha constituency).

== Members of the Legislative Assembly ==
Year	Name	Party
1967	Kumbha Narayan Sardar	Samyukta Socialist Party
1969	Kumbha Narayan Sardar	Samyukta Socialist Party
1972	Kumbha Narayan Sardar	Indian National Congress
1977	Sitaram Paswan	Janata Party
1980	Kumbha Narayan Sardar	Indian National Congress (I)
1985	Kumbha Narayan Sardar	Indian National Congress
1990	Yogendra Narayan Sardar	Janata Dal
1995	Vishwa Mohan Bharti	Janata Dal
2000	Gita Devi	Rashtriya Janata Dal
2002^	Gauri Shankar Sardar	Rashtriya Janata Dal
2005	Mahendra Narayan Sardar	Rashtriya Janata Dal
2005	Vishwa Mohan Bharti	Janata Dal (United)
2010	Neeraj Kumar Singh	Janata Dal (United)
2015	Neeraj Kumar Singh	Bharatiya Janata Party
2020	Neeraj Kumar Singh	Bharatiya Janata Party
2025	Neeraj Kumar Singh	Bharatiya Janata Party

== Election results ==
=== 2025 ===
Bihar Assembly election, 2025: Chhatapur
Party	Candidate	Votes	%	±%
BJP	Neeraj Kumar Singh	122,491	49.18	+2.79
RJD	Vipin Kumar Singh	106,313	42.69	+6.51
Independent	Deepak Kumar	3,993	1.6	
NOTA	None of the above	4,767	1.91	+1.31
Majority		16,178	6.49	−3.72
Turnout		249,059	74.68	+9.5
BJP hold		Swing		

=== 2020 ===
Bihar Assembly election, 2020: Chhatapur
Party	Candidate	Votes	%	±%
BJP	Neeraj Kumar Singh	93,755	46.39	+2.68
RJD	Vipin Kumar Singh	73,120	36.18	−2.17
Independent	Deo Narayan Sada	4,274	2.11	
JAP(L)	Sanjeev Mishra	3,659	1.81	+0.21
Independent	Arun Kumar Azad	3,526	1.74	
Independent	Nasiblal Sada	3,287	1.63	
Independent	Baban Singh	2,531	1.25	
Independent	Dayanand Mishra	2,088	1.03	
AIMIM	Alam	1,990	0.98	
NOTA	None of the above	1,219	0.6	−1.73
Majority		20,635	10.21	+4.85
Turnout		202,088	65.18	−0.6
BJP hold		Swing		

=== 2015 ===
2015 Bihar Legislative Assembly election: Chhatapur
Party	Candidate	Votes	%	±%
BJP	Niraj Kumar Singh	75,697	43.71	
RJD	Jahur Alam	66,405	38.35	
Independent	Upendra Prasad Singh	6,244	3.61	
BSP	Aqueel Ahmad	4,135	2.39	
SS	Deepak Kumar Sah	3,200	1.85	
Independent	Md. Akbar Ali	3,167	1.83	
JAP(L)	Sanjay Kumar Mishra	2,779	1.6	
CPI(M)	Nitu Kumari	2,570	1.48	
Independent	Bishnudev Paswan	2,383	1.38	
Sarvajan Kalyan Loktantrik Party	Ramsundar Mukhiya	1,568	0.91	
NOTA	None of the above	4,041	2.33	
Majority		9,292	5.36	
Turnout		173,177	65.78	

=== 1990 ===
- Yogendra Nr. Sardar (JD): 57,721 votes
- Kumbh Nr. Sardar (INC): 33,698 votes

=== 1977 ===
- Sitaram Paswan (Janata Party): 27,709 votes
- Kumbh Narayan Sardar (INC): 12,296 votes
