= Suresh Mehta Kushwaha =

Indian politician

Member of Bihar Legislative Assembly
- In office 2000–2005
- Preceded by: Ramadhar Singh
- Succeeded by: Ramadhar Singh
- Constituency: Aurangabad, Bihar

Personal details
- Born: Aurangabad, Bihar
- Party: Rashtriya Janata Dal
- Occupation: Politician

Suresh Mehta is an Indian politician and a member of Rashtriya Janata Dal political party based in Bihar. Mehta was elected to Bihar Legislative Assembly on the symbol of Rashtriya Janata Dal in 2000 Bihar Legislative Assembly election. He is the sole non-Rajput candidate to be elected from Aurangabad Vidhan Sabha constituency to Bihar Legislative Assembly since the commencement of elections in until now.

Mehta has been associated with Rashtriya Janata Dal for decades. He has also been the district unit president of RJD for Aurangabad district. In 2020, he was involved in consultation with the prisoners locked in Daudnagar prison of Aurangabad for ending their hunger strike. The inmates were protesting to get some of their demands fulfilled by prison authorities; it was only after involvement of Mehta that the truce happened.

In 2014, Mehta deserted Rashtriya Janata Dal for a brief period of time. He, along with six other deserters were led by Shakuni Choudhary. All of the met Chief Minister Nitish Kumar and joined Janata Dal (United) for a brief period of time.

In 2002, complaint was lodged in a police station in Patna by a junior engineer who accompanied police officials to evict the government flats occupied by unauthorised occupants at the Bir Chand Patel road in Patna. It was alleged that sons of Mehta assaulted the police party and the engineer who were authorised to evict the illegal occupants from several government flats and houses. The engineer named R.K Prasad was subsequently threatened by another MLA Ram Das Rai. However, Rai and Mehta's aide denied the charges and alleged that this was an attempt to frame them under false charges as they had some previous reservation with the officials.
