= Ramchandra Sahani =

Indian politician

Minister of Mines & Geology Government of Bihar
- In office 13 April 2008 – 26 November 2010
- Chief Minister: Nitish Kumar
- Preceded by: Sushil Kumar Modi
- Succeeded by: Satyadeo Narain Arya

Minister of Environment & Forest Government of Bihar
- In office 24 November 2005 – 13 April 2008
- Chief Minister: Nitish Kumar
- Succeeded by: Ramji Das Rishidev

Member of Bihar Legislative Assembly
- In office 2005–2020
- Preceded by: Vijay Prasad Gupta
- Succeeded by: Shashi Bhushan Singh
- Constituency: Sugauli

Personal details
- Born: 2 March 1944 (age 81) Kaithwalia, East Champaran, Bihar
- Political party: Bharatiya Janata Party
- Occupation: Politician

Ramchandra Sahani is a member of the Bharatiya Janata Party, Bihar. He won the Bihar Legislative Assembly election in 2005, 2010 and 2015 from Sugauli.
