= Reotith =

- Village
- Time zone: IST (UTC+5:30)
- Area code: 06159

Reotith is a village located in the Gopalganj district of Bihar, India. It is well known for its thriving market area and cultural significance.

The village hosts a bustling marketplace, including reotith/ganesh market and the established New Market Reotith. These markets serve as a commercial hub for the local community, offering a variety of goods and services to the residents and neighbouring villages. Hundreds of shops are present, making it a significant economic centre in the region. They are many languages spoken, including Bhojpuri, Hindi, Urdu and some people speak English.

== See also ==
- List of villages in India
