= Ramadhar Singh =

Indian

Minister of Cooperative Government of Bihar
- In office 26 August 2011 – 16 June 2013
- Chief Minister: Nitish Kumar
- Preceded by: Sushil Kumar Modi
- Succeeded by: Nitish Kumar
- In office 26 November 2010 – 19 May 2011
- Chief Minister: Nitish Kumar
- Preceded by: Giriraj Singh
- Succeeded by: Sushil Kumar Modi

Member of Bihar Legislative Assembly
- In office 2005–2015
- Preceded by: Suresh Mehta Kushwaha
- Succeeded by: Anand Shankar Singh
- Constituency: Aurangabad
- In office 1995–2000
- Preceded by: Brijmohan Singh
- Succeeded by: Suresh Mehta Kushwaha
- Constituency: Aurangabad

Personal details
- Party: Bharatiya Janata Party

Ramadhar Singh is an Indian politician with the Bharatiya Janata Party. A leader of the party in the state of Bihar, he has been representing the Aurangabad seat in the state assembly winning four out of five elections since 1995. After winning the recent 2010 Bihar legislative assembly election with a margin of 7%, he was appointed Cooperative Minister in Nitish Kumar's cabinet.

However, in May 2011, he was forced to resign after it was revealed by the opposition that he had been repeatedly ignoring court appearance orders related to a communal speech in Aurangabad in 1992. Though he has 12 cases under the Indian Penal code pending against him in the courts, the opposition has alleged that he had not revealed this case in his election affidavit. He has secured bail in the remaining 11 cases.

After resigning, Singh claimed that he was ignorant of the court orders and that his lawyers had failed him in the matter.
