= Raniganj, Gonda =

Raniganj, Uttar Pradesh Raniganj
- village
- Location in Uttar Pradesh, India Raniganj, Uttar Pradesh (India)
- Coordinates: 27.04533°N 82.2167°E
- Country: India
- State: Uttar Pradesh
- District: Gonda

Government
  - Body: Gram panchayat
- Elevation: 97 m (318 ft)

Languages
  - Official: Hindi
- Time zone: UTC+5:30 (IST)
- Vehicle registration: UP
- Nearest city: Gonda
- Lok Sabha constituency: Gonda
- Website: up.gov.in

Raniganj is a village in Gonda district of Uttar Pradesh state of India.

Located along National Highway 231, Raniganj is also a junction railway station on the Indian Railways system.

== See also ==
- Railway stations in India
