= Ram Chandra Singh Yadav =

Indian politician

Member of Bihar Legislative Assembly
- In office 2005–2010
- Preceded by: Dr. Pramod Kumar Singh
- Succeeded by: Dr. Pramod Kumar Singh
- Constituency: Bhabua

Personal details
- Born: Ram Chandra Singh Yadav Bhabua, Kaimur, Bihar
- Party: Bahujan Samaj Party
- Other political affiliations: Janata Dal; Rashtriya Janata Dal; Samajwadi Party
- Spouse: Nitu Singh Yadav
- Education: Educated
- Profession: Agriculturist

Ram Chandra Singh Yadav is an Indian politician. He was elected to the Bihar Legislative Assembly from Bhabua as a member of the Bahujan Samaj Party in 2005-2010. Yadav contested 2019 Indian general elections from Buxar as an Independent candidate but lost.
