= Achmit Rishidev =

Indian politician

Bihar Legislative Assembly
- In office 2015–2025
- Constituency: Raniganj

Personal details
- Party: JD(U)
- Occupation: Politics

Achmit Rishidev is an Indian politician from Bihar and a member of the Bihar Legislative Assembly. Rishidev won the Raniganj assembly constituency on the JD(U) ticket in the 2020 Bihar Legislative Assembly election.
