= Deo Dutt Prasad Yadav =

Indian politician

Member of Bihar Legislative Assembly
- In office 1996–2000
- Preceded by: Lal Babu Yadav
- Succeeded by: Manjeet Kumar Singh
- Constituency: Baikunthpur
- In office 2005–2010
- Preceded by: Manjeet Kumar Singh
- Succeeded by: Manjeet Kumar Singh
- Constituency: Baikunthpur

Personal details
- Born: Baikunthpur,Gopalganj, Bihar
- Party: Rashtriya Janata Dal; Janata Dal
- Children: Prem Shankar Yadav
- Education: B.A. From Bihar University, Muzaffarpur; L.L.B. From Patna University, Patna
- Occupation: Politician social work

Deo Dutt Prasad Yadav is an Indian politician who was elected as a member of Bihar Legislative Assembly from Baikunthpur constituency in 1996 as a member of Janata Dal, in 2005 elected as Rashtriya Janata Dal candidate.

== Legacy ==
His son (Prem Shankar Yadav) is currently member of Bihar Legislative Assembly from Baikunthpur constituency.

== See also ==
- Baikunthpur (Vidhan Sabha constituency)
