= Kishanganj, Madhepura Assembly constituency =

Former constituency of the Bihar legislative assembly in India

Coordinates: 25°40′37″N 86°56′35″E

Kishanganj
- Former constituency for the Bihar Legislative Assembly

Constituency details
- Country: India
- Region: East India
- State: Bihar
- District: Madhepura
- Lok Sabha constituency: Madhepura
- Established: 1977
- Abolished: 2008

Kishanganj Assembly constituency was an assembly constituency in Madhepura district in the Indian state of Bihar. It was reserved for Scheduled castes.

As a consequence of the orders of the Delimitation Commission of India, Kishanganj Assembly constituency ceased to exist in 2010.

It was part of Madhepura Lok Sabha constituency.

== Results ==
=== 1977-2005 ===
In the October 2005 and February 2005 state assembly elections, Renu Kumari of JD(U) won the Kishanganj assembly seat defeating her nearest rival Prof. Rabindra Charan Yadav, Independent/ RJD. Contests in most years were multi cornered but only winners and runners are being mentioned. Prof. Rabindra Charan Yadav of RJD/ JD defeated Md. Abdul Sattar of JD(U) in 2000, Jai Krishna Mehta of Congress in 1995, and Maheshwar Mehta of Congress in 1990. Rajnandan Prasad of LD defeated Singheshwar Mehta of Congress in 1985. Singheshwar Mehta of Congress defeated Rajnandan Prasad of Janata Party (Secular – Charan Singh) in 1980. Rajnandan Prasad of JP defeated Bishnudeo Singh, Independent, in 1977.
