= Parmanand Rishideo =

Indian politician

Member of the Bihar Legislative Assembly

Personal details
- Born: 12 January 1962 (age 64) Araria,Bihar
- Party: Bharatiya Janata Party
- Spouse: Jyotsna Rishideo
- Children: One Son,One Daughter
- Education: Jawaharlal Nehru University, New Delhi
- Occupation: Politician

Parmanand Rishideo (born 12 January 1962) is an Indian politician. He is a member of the Bihar Legislative Assembly, and currently represents Raniganj. He exposed the Mahadalit Land Scam when he raised the issue on the floor of the Bihar Legislative Assembly.
