= Satyadeo Prasad Singh =

Indian politician

- Mr. SP Singh in 2026

Member of Bihar Legislative Assembly Goreyakothi Constituency
- In office 2015–2020
- Preceded by: Bhupendra Narayan Singh
- Succeeded by: Devesh Kant Singh
- Constituency: Goreyakothi

Member of Bihar Legislative Assembly Basantpur Constituency
- In office 2000–2010
- Preceded by: Manik Chand Roy
- Succeeded by: Manik Chand Roy
- Constituency: Basantpur

Founder Member Of Bharatiya Janata Party (BJP)(Founded In 1980)

Personal details
- Born: 1 November 1960 (age 65) Siwan, Bihar, India
- Other political affiliations: Bharatiya Janata Party(1980-2012) Rashtriya Janata Dal(2012-2020) Janata Dal United (2021-2025)
- Education: Graduate (Physics)
- As of 01 April 2026

Satyadeo Prasad Singh is an Indian politician. He has been MLA for more than a decade from Goreyakothi and Basantpur Constituency of Siwan, Bihar. He is a JP Senani. He is contesting Bihar Legislative Assembly Elections from 1985.

== Early life ==
Singh was born on 1 November 1960 in Village Kauriya of District Siwan, Bihar. His father Shivpujan Singh was a government teacher. Satyadeo belongs to Rajput caste.

He has earned a degree in Physics from V.V. Muzaffarpur now named as Jagdam College Chhapra. He was also studying law from Ganga Singh College Chhapra but he couldn’t complete his degree because he got arrested in Ram Janmabhoomi Case. Later he married Usha Singh in April 2003 after becoming MLa and the couple have two children namely Vijay Raj and Ravi Prakash Raushan.

== Political career ==
Singh belongs to a socialist class of politicians. He is a JP Senani and had participated very actively in the movement led by Jayprakash Narayan against the Emergency in 1975.

Singh actively participated in the 1977 general elections and later he became the founder member of the BJP. In 1980 general elections he was offered ticket for the first time by BJP but he couldn’t contest because his age was less than 25. Singh contested for the first time in 1985 from Basantpur Constituency of Siwan on ticket of BJP. He lost with a very less margin in the general elections of 1985, 1990 and 1995. He consecutively lost three elections on BJP Ticket.

He again contested in year 2000 for the fourth time and he won by defeating his rival Manik Chand Ray of RJD from Basantpur.

In 2010 his constituency Basantpur was merged in Goreyakothi Constituency. In 2010 Elections BJP denied him ticket and he contested as an independent candidate from Goreyakothi and secured 12000 votes but lost the election. In 2012 he joined RJD in presence of RJD chief Lalu Yadav in Madarpur Field of Lakri Nabiganj.

In 2015 Singh got the ticket of RJD from Goreyakothi and he won by defeating the candidate of BJP and became the first Rajput MLA from this constituency.

In 2020 RJD denied him ticket and he contested as a candidate of RLSP but he lost. Sources say that he indirectly shifted his entire votes to BJP candidate that helped the BJP candidate in winning the election.

In 2025 Singh was not fighting the election and was silent but after a derogatory remark on Rajput caste by BJP candidate he announced to support the RJD candidate. Sources say that his support to RJD candidate helped him to get around 93k votes.

== Positions held ==
#	From	To	Position	Party
1.	1985	2012	Member District Executive, BJP Siwan	Bharatiya Janata Party
2.	1995	1997	Vice District President, BJP Siwan	Bharatiya Janata Party
3.	1998	2000	Vice President, BJP Bihar	Bharatiya Janata Party
4.	2000	2005	Member of Bihar Legislative Assembly (1st term)	Bharatiya Janata Party
5.	2005	2010	Member of Bihar Legislative Assembly (2nd term)	Bharatiya Janata Party
6.	2012	2014	Member National Executive (RJD)	Rashtriya Janata Dal
7.	2015	2020	Member of Bihar Legislative Assembly (3rd term)	Rashtriya Janata Dal
8.	2021	2023	Member of State Political Advisory Committee (JDU)	Janata Dal United
9.	2024	2025	Member of State Executive (JDU)	Janata Dal United

== Election results ==
Satyadeo Prasad Singh of BJP defeated Manik Chandra Roy of RJD by 1000 votes in the 2000 assembly elections.

Satyadeo Prasad Singh of BJP defeated Manik Chandra Roy of RJD by 3000 votes in the 2005 assembly elections.

Satyadeo Prasad Singh of RJD defeated Devesh Kaant Singh of BJP by 7,000 votes in the 2015 assembly election. Siwan.
