= Prem Shankar Prasad =

Indian politician (born 1980)

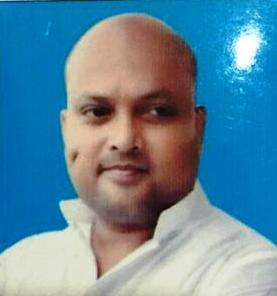

Member of the Bihar Legislative Assembly
- In office 2020–2025
- Preceded by: Mithlesh Tiwari
- Succeeded by: Mithlesh Tiwari
- Constituency: Baikunthpur

Personal details
- Born: 7 September 1980 (age 46) Baikunthpur,Gopalganj, Bihar
- Party: Rashtriya Janata Dal
- Parent: Deo Dutt Prasad Yadav (father)
- Education: MBA, BBA

Prem Shankar Prasad (born 7 September 1980), also known as Prem Shankar Yadav, is an Indian politician and a member of Bihar Legislative Assembly, representing the Baikunthpur Assembly constituency in the Gopalganj district in the state of Bihar. He is also a member of the Rashtriya Janata Dal party.

== Political life ==
His father (Deo Dutt Prasad Yadav) won Baikunthpur constituency three times.
