= Raniganj, Bihar Assembly constituency =

- Constituency No. 47 - for the Bihar Legislative Assembly

Constituency details
- Country: India
- Region: East India
- State: Bihar
- District: Araria
- Established: 1957
- Total electors: 301,120
- Reservation: SC

Member of Legislative Assembly
- 18th Bihar Legislative Assembly
- Incumbent Avinash Mangalam
- Party: RJD
- Alliance: MGB
- Elected year: 2025

Raniganj is one of the 243 constituencies of the Bihar Legislative Assembly.

Each election in the Raniganj Vidhansabha constituency has been won by a different political party (1957–2025).
1. INC (5 term) (29.4%)
2. BJP (3 term) (17.6%)
3. JP (1 term) (5.88%)
4. JD (2 term) (11.8%)
5. RJD (2 term) (11.8%)
6. JDU (2 term) (11.8%)
7. IND (2 term) (11.8%)

== Overview ==
Raniganj is a town in Araria district of Bihar. It is having 32 Panchayats. It is one of the largest blocks in Araria District. As per Delimitation of Parliamentary and Assembly constituencies Order, 2008, No 47 Raniganj Assembly constituency is composed of the following: Raniganj community development block; Birnagar East, Birnagar West, Dhaneshwari, Haripur Kala, Khutha Baijnathpur, Naya Bhargama and Vishaharia gram panchayats of Bhargama CD Block.

== Raniganj:RJD Gains Ground, Wins Assembly Seat in 2025 ==
In the 2024 Lok Sabha election, BJP candidate Pradeep Kumar Singh secured 1,06,300 votes in the Raniganj Assembly segment, while RJD candidate Shahnawaz received 88,069 votes. BJP led by 18,231 votes.

However, in the 2025 Bihar Assembly election, RJD candidate Avinash Mangalam secured 1,11,590 votes, while JD(U) candidate Achmit Rishidev received 1,03,060 votes.

Avinash Mangalam won by a margin of 8,530 votes.

Raniganj Assembly constituency is part of No 9 Araria (Lok Sabha constituency).

== Members of the Legislative Assembly ==
| Year | Name | Party |
|---|---|---|
| 1957 | Ram Narayan Mandal | Indian National Congress |
| 1962 | Ganesh Lal Verma | Independent |
| 1967 | Dumar Lal Baitha | Indian National Congress |
| 1969 | Dumar Lal Baitha | Indian National Congress |
| 1972 | Bundel Paswan | Independent |
| 1977 | Adhik Lal Paswan | Janata Party |
| 1980 | Yamuna Prasad Ram | Indian National Congress (I) |
| 1985 | Yamuna Prasad Ram | Indian National Congress |
| 1990 | Shanti Devi | Janata Dal |
| 1995 | Shanti Devi | Janata Dal |
| 2000 | Yamuna Prasad Ram | Rashtriya Janata Dal |
| 2005 | Parmanand Rishideo | Bharatiya Janata Party |
| 2005 | Ramji Das Rishidev | Bharatiya Janata Party |
| 2010 | Parmanand Rishideo | Bharatiya Janata Party |
| 2015 | Achmit Rishidev | Janata Dal (United) |
| 2020 | Achmit Rishidev | Janata Dal (United) |
| 2025 | Avinash Mangalam | Rashtriya Janata Dal |

== Election results ==
=== 2025 ===
2025 Bihar Legislative Assembly election: Raniganj
| Party | Candidate | Votes | % | ±% |
|---|---|---|---|---|
| RJD | Avinash Mangalam | 111,590 | 48.44 | +5.56 |
| JD(U) | Achmit Rishidev | 103,060 | 44.74 | +0.62 |
| JSP | Krityanand Ram | 3,183 | 1.38 | |
| Independent | Aman Raj | 3,126 | 1.36 | |
| Independent | Hiranand Paswan | 2,146 | 0.93 | |
| NOTA | None of the above | 5,118 | 2.22 | −0.78 |
| Majority | | 8,530 | 3.7 | +2.46 |
| Turnout | | 230,348 | 67.25 | +12.0 |
| RJD gain from JD(U) | | Swing | | |

=== 2020 ===
2020 Bihar Legislative Assembly election: Raniganj
| Party | Candidate | Votes | % | ±% |
|---|---|---|---|---|
| JD(U) | Achmit Rishidev | 81,901 | 44.12 | −4.03 |
| RJD | Avinash Mangalam | 79,597 | 42.88 | |
| LJP | Parmanand Rishidev | 5,038 | 2.71 | |
| JAP(L) | Sunil Paswan | 2,922 | 1.57 | +0.12 |
| Independent | Shankar Brahamchari | 2,467 | 1.33 | |
| AIMIM | Roshan Devi | 2,412 | 1.3 | +0.27 |
| Independent | Kalo Paswan | 1,943 | 1.05 | |
| NOTA | None of the above | 5,577 | 3.0 | −0.93 |
| Majority | | 2,304 | 1.24 | −8.01 |
| Turnout | | 185,640 | 55.25 | −1.67 |
| JD(U) hold | | Swing | | |

=== 2015 ===
In the 2015 Bihar Assembly Elections, Achmit Rishidev of JDU defeated Ramji Das Rishidev of BJP.

2015 Bihar Legislative Assembly election: Raniganj
| Party | Candidate | Votes | % | ±% |
|---|---|---|---|---|
| JD(U) | Achmit Rishidev | 77,717 | 48.15 | |
| BJP | Ramji Das Rishidev | 62,787 | 38.9 | |
| Independent | Basant Paswan | 2,976 | 1.84 | |
| JAP(L) | Sunil Paswan | 2,342 | 1.45 | |
| BSP | Jay Ram Rishidev | 1,935 | 1.2 | |
| AIMIM | Dr. Amit Kumar | 1,669 | 1.03 | |
| NOTA | None of the above | 6,351 | 3.93 | |
| Majority | | 14,930 | 9.25 | |
| Turnout | | 161,402 | 56.92 | |

=== 2010 ===
In November 2010, October 2005 and February 2005 state assembly elections, Parmanand Rishideo of BJP won the Raniganj, Araraia seat defeating his nearest rivals Shanti Devi of RJD in November 2010 and October 2005, and Ashok Paswan of LJP in February 2005. Contests in most years were multi cornered but only winners and runners up are being mentioned. Yamuna Prasad Ram of RJD defeated Ramji Das Rishideo of BJP in 2000. Shanti Devi of JD defeated Yamuna Prasad Ram of Congress in 1995 and 1990. Yamuna Prasad Ram of Congress defeated Bundel Paswan of JP in 1985 and Sukhdeo Paswan of Janata Party (Secular – Charan Singh) in 1980. Adhik Lal Paswan of JP defeated Bundel Paswan of Congress in 1977.
