= Araria Lok Sabha constituency =

Lok Sabha Constituency in Bihar

Coordinates: 26.1°N 87.4°E

Araria
- Lok Sabha constituency

Constituency details
- Country: India
- Region: East India
- State: Bihar
- Assembly constituencies: Narpatganj; Raniganj; Forbesganj; Araria; Jokihat; Sikti
- Established: 1967
- Reservation: None

Member of Parliament
- 18th Lok Sabha
- Incumbent Pradeep Kumar Singh
- Party: BJP
- Alliance: NDA
- Elected year: 2024
- Preceded by: Sarfaraz Alam; RJD

Araria Lok Sabha constituency is one of the 40 Lok Sabha (parliamentary) constituencies in Bihar state in eastern India. In 2024, the incumbent Pradeep Kumar Singh of Bharatiya Janata Party again won the election from this constituency.

According to the 2011 census Araria district has a population of 2,811,569, roughly equal to the nation of Jamaica or the US state of Utah. This gives it a ranking of 139th in India (out of a total of 640). The district has a population density of992 inhabitants per square kilometre (2,570/sq mi) . Its population growth rate over the decade 2001-2011 was 30%. Araria has a sex ratio of 921 females for every 1000 males, and a literacy rate of 55.1%. 6.00% of the population lives in urban areas. Scheduled Castes and Scheduled Tribes make up 13.61% and 1.38% of the population respectively.

Religions in Araria district (2011)
Religion	Percent
Hinduism	56.68%
Islam	42.95%
Other or not stated	0.37%

== Demographics ==
Historical population
Year	Pop.	±% p.a.
1901	374,909	—
1911	402,864	+0.72%
1921	430,193	+0.66%
1931	465,311	+0.79%
1941	506,546	+0.85%
1951	537,600	+0.60%
1961	779,578	+3.79%
1971	994,586	+2.47%
1981	1,272,151	+2.49%
1991	1,611,638	+2.39%
2001	2,158,608	+2.97%
2011	2,811,569	+2.68%

== Araria Lok Sabha Election 2024 ==
=== Pradeep Kumar Singh (BJP) vs. Shahnawaz (RJD) ===
Assembly Constituency-Wise Vote Comparison

No.	Assembly Constituency	Pradeep Kumar Singh (BJP)	Shahnawaz (RJD)	Lead
1	Narpatganj	1,22,421	83,647	BJP +38,774
2	Raniganj	1,06,300	88,069	BJP +18,231
3	Forbesganj	1,26,457	87,254	BJP +39,203
4	Araria	74,655	1,22,933	RJD +48,278
5	Jokihat	56,826	1,21,794	RJD +64,968
6	Sikti	1,12,459	75,207	BJP +37,252
Total	6 Assembly Constituencies	5,99,118	5,78,904	BJP +20,214

=== Assembly-Wise Lead Summary ===
Party	Number of Constituencies Leading
BJP (Pradeep Kumar Singh)	4
RJD (Shahnawaz)	2

=== Key Election Figures ===
- Total BJP Votes: 5,99,118
- Total RJD Votes: 5,78,904
- Overall Vote Margin: 20,214
- BJP Lead: 4 Assembly Constituencies
- RJD Lead: 2 Assembly Constituencies

Overall EVM Vote Lead: BJP – 20,214 Votes

Each election in the Araria Lok Sabha constituency has been won by a different political party (1967–2024)
1. INC (4 term) (25.0%)
2. BJP (5 term) (31.2%)
3. JD (3 term) (18.8%)
4. JP (1 term) (6.25%)
5. RJD (3 term) (18.8%)

Hinduism is the majority religion. Muslims are majority in Araria and Jokihat blocks, and are in near-majority in Palasi block.

Block	Hindu %	Muslim %	Other %
Narpatganj	70.45	29.23	0.32
Forbesganj	62.56	36.99	0.45
Bhargama	75.26	24.52	0.22
Raniganj	69.09	30.3	0.61
Araria	39.01	60.61	0.38
kursakanta	74.79	24.92	0.29
Sikti	65.09	34.73	0.18
Palasi	51.09	48.46	0.45
Jokihat	21.39	78.38	0.23

Languages in Araria district (2011)
1. Urdu (28.7%)
2. Hindi (25.1%)
3. Maithili (20.6%)
4. 'Other' Hindi (16.4%)
5. Bengali (2.17%)
6. Kulhaiya (2.10%)
7. Surjapuri (1.91%)
8. Santali (1.05%)
9. Others (2.01%)

== Assembly segments ==
Araria Lok Sabha constituency comprises the following six assembly segments:

#	Name	District	Member	Party	2024 lead
46	Narpatganj	Araria	Devanti Yadav	BJP	BJP
47	Raniganj (SC)	Araria	Avinash Manglam	RJD	BJP
48	Forbesganj	Araria	Manoj Bishwas	INC	BJP
49	Araria	Araria	Avidur Rahman	INC	RJD
50	Jokihat	Araria	Murshid Alam	AIMIM	RJD
51	Sikti	Araria	Vijay Kumar Mandal	BJP	BJP

== Members of Parliament ==
Year	Name	Party
1967	Tulmohan Ram	Indian National Congress
1971	Tulmohan Ram	Indian National Congress
1977	Mahendra Narayan Sardar	Janata Party
1980	Dumar Lal Baitha	Indian National Congress (I)
1984	Dumar Lal Baitha	Indian National Congress
1989	Sukdeo Paswan	Janata Dal
1991	Sukdeo Paswan	Janata Dal
1996	Sukdeo Paswan	Janata Dal
1998	Ramji Das Rishidev	Bharatiya Janata Party
1999	Sukdeo Paswan	Rashtriya Janata Dal
2004	Sukdeo Paswan	Bharatiya Janata Party
2009	Pradeep Kumar Singh	Bharatiya Janata Party
2014	Mohammed Taslimuddin	Rashtriya Janata Dal
2018^	Sarfaraz Alam	Rashtriya Janata Dal
2019	Pradeep Kumar Singh	Bharatiya Janata Party
2024	Pradeep Kumar Singh	Bharatiya Janata Party

^ by poll

== Election results ==
=== 2024 ===
2024 Indian general elections: Araria
Party	Candidate	Votes	%	±%
BJP	Pradeep Kumar Singh	600,146	47.91	▼4.96
RJD	Mohammed Shahnawaz Alam	5,80,052	46.31	▲5.17
Independent	Shatrughan Prasad Suman	13,746	1.10%	New entry
BSP	Md Ghousul Azam	12,690	1.08%	New entry
NOTA	None of the Above	13,504	1.08	▼0.68
Margin of victory		20,094	1.6	▼10.16
Turnout		12,52,751	62.02	
BJP hold		Swing	▼4.96	

=== 2019 ===
2019 Indian general elections: Araria
Party	Candidate	Votes	%	±%
BJP	Pradeep Kumar Singh	618,434	52.87	+9.68
RJD	Sarfaraz Alam	4,81,193	41.14	−8.01
NOTA	None of the Above	20,618	1.76	+0.06
Majority		1,37,241	11.73	+5.77
Turnout		11,69,741	64.79	+5.13
BJP gain from RJD		Swing	+3.72	

=== 2018 By election ===
By Election, 2018: Araria
Party	Candidate	Votes	%	±%
RJD	Sarfaraz Alam	509,334	49.15	+7.34
BJP	Pradeep Kumar Singh	4,47,546	43.19	+16.39
JAP(L)	Prince Victor	20,922	2.02	N/A
RJSP	Upendra Sahani	18,772	1.81	N/A
IND.	Sudama Singh	11,347	1.10	N/A
NOTA	None of the Above	17,607	1.70	−−
Majority		61,788	5.96	−9.05
Turnout		10,36,194	59.62	−1.82
RJD hold		Swing	+7.34	

=== 2014 ===
2014 Indian general elections: Araria
Party	Candidate	Votes	%	±%
RJD	Taslimuddin	407,978	41.81	+41.81
BJP	Pradeep Kumar Singh	2,61,474	26.80	−11.91
JD(U)	Vijay Kumar Mandal	2,21,769	22.73	+22.73
BSP	Abdul Rahman	17,724	1.82	+0.37
IND.	Pankaj Kishor Mandal	10,704	1.10	+1.10
SJP(R)	Sar Wat Jahre Ansari	6,376	0.65	+0.65
AAP	Chandra Bhushan	5,685	0.58	+0.58
Independent	Alamdar Hussain	5,645	0.58	+0.58
CPI(ML)L	Sanjay Kumar Rishidev	5,292	0.54	+0.22
Janta Dal Rashtravadi	Md. Aslam Beg	5,149	0.53	+0.53
Bharat Vikas Morcha	Rajesh Kumar	4,646	0.48	+0.48
Lok Dal	Ramanand Rishideo	3,411	0.35	+0.35
Bahujan Mukti Party	Bidayanand Paswan	3,350	0.34	+0.34
NOTA	None of the Above	16,608	1.70	
Majority		1,46,504	15.01	+11.93
Turnout		9,75,811	61.48	+5.77
RJD gain from BJP		Swing	+3.10	

=== 2009 ===
2009 Indian general elections: Araria
Party	Candidate	Votes	%	±%
BJP	Pradeep Kumar Singh	202,702	21.58	New entry
LJP	Zakr Hussain Khan	260240	19.85%	New entry
INC	Dr Shakil Ahmad khan	49619	3.79%	
Independent	DiNesh Rathour	27308	2.08%	
IND.	Prince Victor	22264	1.7%	
BSP	Raja Raman Bhaskar	10578	0.81%	
Independent	Laxmi Sada	9487	0.72%	
Independent	Shukdeo Paswan	9015	0.69%	
Independent	Mohammad Saifur Rab	6936	0.53%	
independent	Pramod Singh Yadav	5,889	0.45%	
Independent	Abdul Wahab	4475	0.34%	
Independent	Satya narayan (Writer)	4199	0.32	
RKJP Rashtriya karantikari Janata Party	Ayajudin	4179	0.32	
Independent	Vijay Sah	4088	0.31%	
Independent	Sadhana Devi	3628	0.28%	
Independent	Nityanad Bishwas	3534	0.27%	
Independent	Abdul Gafoor	3157	0.24%	
RJJM Rashtriya Jan Jagaran Morcha	Nasim Ahmad Gazi	3089	0.24%	
Independent	Sada Nand Choudhary	2751	0.21%	
Independent	Kanahiya Kumar Das	2740	0.21%	
Independent	Nand Lal Paswan	2678	0.20%	
CPI (ML)(L)	Kamali Devi	2319	0.18%	
Independent	OM Prakash	1955	0.15%	
Independent	Sanjay Kumar Kha	1924	0.15%	
Independent	Md Sajjad	1632	0.12%	
Margin of victory		22502	1.73%	
Turnout		730456	55.71%	
BJP gain from LJP		Swing		

=== 2004 ===
2004 Indian general elections: Araria
Party	Candidate	Votes	%	±%
BJP	Sukdeo Paswan	216,677		
SP	Rarji Das Rishideo	188,933		
LJP	Ram Sewak Hazari	173,502		
BSP	Narayan Kumar Ram	17,316		
Independent	Satya Narayan Writer	11,946		
Margin of victory		27,744		
Turnout		652439		
BJP hold		Swing		

== See also ==
- Araria district
- List of constituencies of the Lok Sabha
