= Araria (disambiguation) =

Araria is a neighbourhood in Bihar, India.

Araria may also refer to:

- Araria (community development block)
- Araria district
  - Araria subdivision
  - Araria Assembly constituency
  - Araria Lok Sabha constituency
