= Araria subdivision =

Administrative subdivision in Araria, Bihar

Araria
- subdivision
- Country: India
- State: Bihar
- Region: Mithila
- District: Araria
- Assembly constituency: Raniganj, Araria
- Time zone: UTC+5.30 (IST)
- Vehicle registration: BR-

Araria subdivision is an administrative subdivision out of two subdivisions of Araria district in the state of Bihar, India. It comprises 6 Blocks of Araria The headquarter of the subdivision is in Araria town.

== Etymology ==
During the British Raj the area was under the administration of a British district collector and municipal commissioner, Alexander John Forbes (1807-1890) of East India Company. Forbes had a bungalow at the same location. Consequently, the area was known as 'residential area' also abbreviated as 'R-area'. Over time, the name transformed to 'Araria' and the neighbouring subdivision came to be known as 'Forbesganj'.

== Politics ==
Araria (Vidhan Sabha constituency) is the assembly constituency representing Araria (community development block). The same constituency also includes Araria nagar parishad. Avidur Rahman from Indian National Congress is the MLA elected in the 2020 Bihar Legislative Assembly election from Araria (Vidhan Sabha constituency).

Araria subdivision is part of No 9 Araria (Lok Sabha constituency) (SC). Pradeep Kumar Singh, BJP is the MP elected in the 2019 Indian general election.

== Blocks of Araria subdivision ==
Araria subdivision has six blocks.

1. Araria
2. Jokihat
3. Kursakanta
4. Raniganj
5. Sikti
6. Palasi

== See also ==
- Forbesganj subdivision
- Administration in Bihar
