= Narpatganj =

Narpatganj Madhura
- Town
- Location in Bihar, India
- Coordinates: 26°20′0″N 87°6′0″E
- Country: India
- State: Bihar
- District: Araria

Government
  - Body: Narpat Ganj

Area
  - Total: 2,828.83 km^{2} (1,092.22 sq mi)
- Elevation: 68 m (223 ft)

Population
  - Total: 1.8 million
  - Density: 1,000/km^{2} (2,600/sq mi)

Languages
  - Official: Maithili, Hindi
- Time zone: UTC+5:30 (IST)
- PIN: 854335
- Telephone code: 06455
- ISO 3166 code: IN-BR
- Vehicle registration: BR38
- Coastline: 00 kilometres (0 mi)
- Nearest city: Forbesganj, Katihar
- Sex ratio: 89.94% ♂/♀
- Literacy: 48%%
- Lok Sabha constituency: Narpatganj
- Civic agency: Narpat Ganj
- Climate: Humid (Köppen)
- Precipitation: 1,020 millimetres (40 in)
- Avg. summer temperature: 32 °C (90 °F)
- Avg. winter temperature: 3 °C (37 °F)
- Website: www.allaboutbihar.com

Narpatganj is a Secular town and municipal headquarter of Narpatganj (community development block) of Forbesganj subdivision in the Araria district of Bihar state, India.

== Geography ==
Narpatganj is municipal headquarter of Narpatganj (community development block), one of the 9 blocks in Araria district.

=== Location ===
National Highway 27 passes through Narpatganj. Nearest airport is Purnia airport.

== Administration and politics ==
Narpatganj (Vidhan Sabha constituency) is the assembly constituency for the city. Jai Prakash Yadav (BJP) elected in 2020 is the MLA.

== Transport ==
Nearest airport is Bagdogra (IXB) which is approximately 175 KM.
