= Narpatganj (disambiguation) =

Narpatganj is a town in Bihar, India.

Narpatganj may also refer to:

- Narpatganj (community development block)
- Narpatganj (Vidhan Sabha constituency)

== See also ==
- Narapati (disambiguation)
- Ganj (disambiguation)
