= Araria (community development block) =

Community development block in Araria district, Bihar, India

- CD Block
- Country: India
- State: Bihar
- Region: Mithila
- District: Araria
- Subdivision: Araria
- Headquarters: Araria (town)

Government
  - Type: Community development
  - Body: Araria Block

Languages
  - Main: Maithili, Hindi, Urdu, English
- Time zone: UTC+5:30 (IST)

Araria is a Community development block and a town in district of Araria, in Bihar state of India. It is one out of 6 blocks of Araria subdivision. The headquarter of the block is at Araria town.

The block is divided into many Village Councils and villages.

== Etymology ==
During the British Raj the area was under the administration of a British district collector and municipal commissioner, Alexander John Forbes (1807-1890) of East India Company. Forbes had a bungalow at the same location. Consequently, the area was known as 'residential area' also abbreviated as 'R-area'. Over time the name transformed to 'Araria' and the neighbouring subdivision came to be known as 'Forbesganj'.

== Gram Panchayats ==
Gram panchayats of Araria block in Araria subdivision, Araria district.

== Politics ==
Araria (Vidhan Sabha constituency) is the assembly constituency representing Araria (community development block). The same constituency also includes Araria nagar parishad. Avidur Rahman from Indian National Congress is the MLA elected in the 2020 Bihar Legislative Assembly election.

Araria (Vidhan Sabha constituency) is part of No 9 Araria (Lok Sabha constituency) (SC). Pradeep Kumar Singh, BJP is the MP elected in the 2019 Indian general election.

== See also ==
- Administration in Bihar
