= Narapati =

Narapati (Sanskrit: नरपति, romanized: narapati) is a Sanskrit word meant king (literally man-lord).

== Burmese ==
Narapati was a Burmese royal title, and may refer to:

=== Kings ===
- Sithu II: King of Burma, r. 1174–1211 who is also known as Narapati Sithu
- Narapati I of Ava: King of Ava, r. 1442–68
- Narapati II of Ava: King of Ava, r. 1501–27
- Narapati of Prome: King of Prome, r. 1532–39
- Narapati III of Ava: King of Ava, r. 1545–51
- Narapati IV of Ava: King of Ava, r. 1551–55
- Narapati of Mrauk-U: King of Arakan, r. 1638–45

=== Queens ===
- Narapati Medaw: Chief vicereine of Prome, r. 1551–88

== Javanese ==
- Narapati Raja Śrī Sañjaya: King of Mataram

== See also ==
- Narpatganj (disambiguation)
- Narpati Singh, Indian ruler and freedom fighter
- Narpat Singh Rajvi, Indian politician
- Narpath, Indian mentalist
- Narpat Singh Rajpurohit, Indian environmentalist
- Nripati Chattopadhyay, Indian actor
