= Haripur Kala =

- Gram Panchayat
- Country: India
- Elevation: 61 m (200 ft)
- Postal code: 854202

Haripur Kala otherwise Harpur Kalan is a gram panchayat in Bhargama block in Araria district of the state of Bihar in India. It had a population of 3,406 people in 2011, which was relatively uneducated.
