= Maa Khadgeshwari Kali Mandir =

Hindu temple in Bihar, India

- Location in Bihar

Religion
- Affiliation: Hinduism
- District: Araria district
- Deity: Kali
- Festivals: Deepawali, Maha Shivaratri, Vijayadashami, Kali Puja

Location
- Location: Araria
- State: Bihar
- Country: India
- Interactive map of Maa Khadgeshwari Kali Mandir
- Coordinates: 26°13′N 87°46′E

Architecture
- Creator: Sarojanand Dixit (Nanu Baba).
- Established: 1884
- Groundbreaking: 1987
- Completed: 2011

Specifications
- Temple: 1
- Monument: 2

Maa Khadgeshwari Kali Mandir is a Hindu temple dedicated to Goddess Kali. It is a part of Hindu pilgrimage and located in Araria, in Araria district of Bihar, India.

The temple is visited by Hindus from Bihar, Jharkhand, West Bengal and neighboring country Nepal with the hope that Maa Kali will fulfill their wishes.

Special prayers are held every Tuesday and Saturday wherein "Kheer" or "Khichdi" is offered to Kali maa as prasad by her devotees and is distributed among all.

The height of the temple 152 feet (46 m), which makes it tallest Kali temple of the world.

The main temple along with Lord Shiva is situated in the same premises.

== History ==
In 1884, the idol of the goddess was initially kept in a Jhopadi. In the early days, locals started worshipping by visiting the temple. The present priest and patron of the temple Sarojanand Dixit (Popularly known as Nanu Baba), a former football player, holds the overall management and worshiping work of the temple since the early 1970s. His initiative to build the tallest Kali Temple of Asia at the same place started in 1987. The construction work of the temple completed in 2011 through donations, crowdsource funding, and public charity The temple is considered to be over 200 years old according to local reports.
