= Anil Kumar Yadav =

Anil Kumar Yadav may refer to two Indian politicians from Bihar:

- Anil Kumar Yadav (politician, born 1956), represented Khagaria in the Lok Sabha 1996–1998
- Anil Kumar Yadav (politician, born 1960), represented Narpatganj in the BLA 2015–2020
