= Tulmohan Ram =

Indian politician

Member of Parliament, Lok Sabha
- In office 3 March 1967 – 23 March 1977
- Preceded by: Constituency established
- Succeeded by: Mahendra Narayan Sardar
- Constituency: Araria
- In office 16 April 1962 – 3 March 1967
- Preceded by: Constituency established
- Succeeded by: Constituency abolished
- Constituency: Sonbarsa

Member of Bihar Legislative Assembly
- In office 25 February 1957 – 16 April 1962 Serving with Yogeshwar Jha
- Preceded by: Constituency established
- Succeeded by: Khub Lal Mahto
- Constituency: Triveniganj

Tulmohan Ram was an Indian politician belonging to Indian National Congress. He was a member of the 5th Lok Sabha, representing Araria in Bihar.

During Indira Gandhi’s government in 1974, Ram was indicted in a corruption case relating to issuance of licenses from then Foreign Trade ministry. L. N. Mishra was then the Foreign Trade Minister.
