= Akarthappa Village, Bihar =

Indian village in Araria district, Bihar

Akarthappa is a large village which is based in the Bhargama block of the Araria district of the state of Bihar. It has a total population of 2501 out of which 1286 are males and 1215 are females, as per the census of 2011. The location code number as per the Census of India is 221679.

== Literacy rate ==
There is a total of 551 literate people in the village of Akarthappa out of which 345 are males and 206 are females. The nearest school is Ums Akar Thapa which runs from class 1 to class 8. The literacy rate of Akarthappa village was 28.56% compared to 61.80% of Bihar. In Akarthappa male literacy stands at 34.47% while the female literacy rate was 22.20%.

== Demographics ==
The PIN code of Akarthappa is 854334 and the Post Office is K.Baijnathpur.

== Railway ==
The nearest railway stations to Akarthappa are:

- Janakinagar- 11.16 km
- Harapatti - 11.82 km
- Rupauli - 12.19 km
- Banmankhi Junction - 13.7 km
- MURLIGANJ - 14.87 km
- Sukhasan Kothi - 15.3 km
- Aurahi - 17.9 km

== Adjacent communities ==
Akarthappa is surrounded with these nearby villages:

- Bhattaon Kamat
- Chiraiya
- Nawalganj Pitamber
- Baija Patti
- Peare Lal Chakla
- Newa Lal Chakla
- Bisaria
- Bisaria Patti
- Majrahi Chakla
- Bhargaon
