= Jai Prakash Yadav =

Jai Prakash Yadav may refer to:

- Jai Prakash Yadav (cricketer) and coach from Bhopal.
- Jai Prakash Yadav (politician) from Narpatganj, Bihar.
