= Vijay Kumar Mandal =

Indian politician

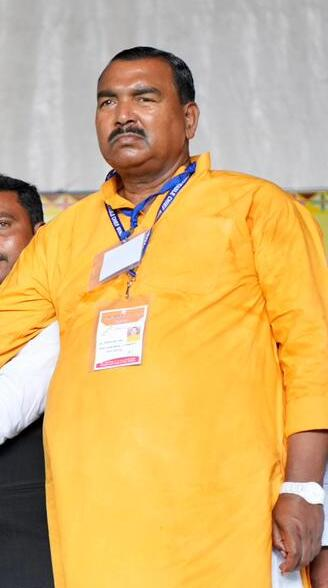

Minister of Disaster Management Government of Bihar
- In office 16 March 2025 – 6 October 2025
- Preceded by: Hari Narayan Pramanik
- Succeeded by: Narayan Prasad

Member of the Bihar Legislative Assembly
- Incumbent
- Assumed office 2015
- Preceded by: Anandi Prasad Yadav
- Constituency: Sikti
- In office 2009–2010
- Preceded by: Pradeep Kumar Singh
- Succeeded by: Zakir Hussain Khan
- Constituency: Araria
- In office 1995–2005
- Preceded by: Vinod Kumar Roy
- Succeeded by: Pradeep Kumar Singh
- Constituency: Araria

Personal details
- Born: 1 January 1965 (age 61)
- Party: Bharatiya Janata Party
- Occupation: Politician

Vijay Kumar Mandal (born 1 January 1965) is an Indian politician from Bihar. He is a five time Member of Bihar Legislative Assembly representing Bharatiya Janata Party.

== Early life and education ==
Mandal is from Araria, Araria district, Bihar. His father Nandkeshwar Mandal is a farmer. He completed his Class 10 at Government High School, Araria in 1984.

== Career ==
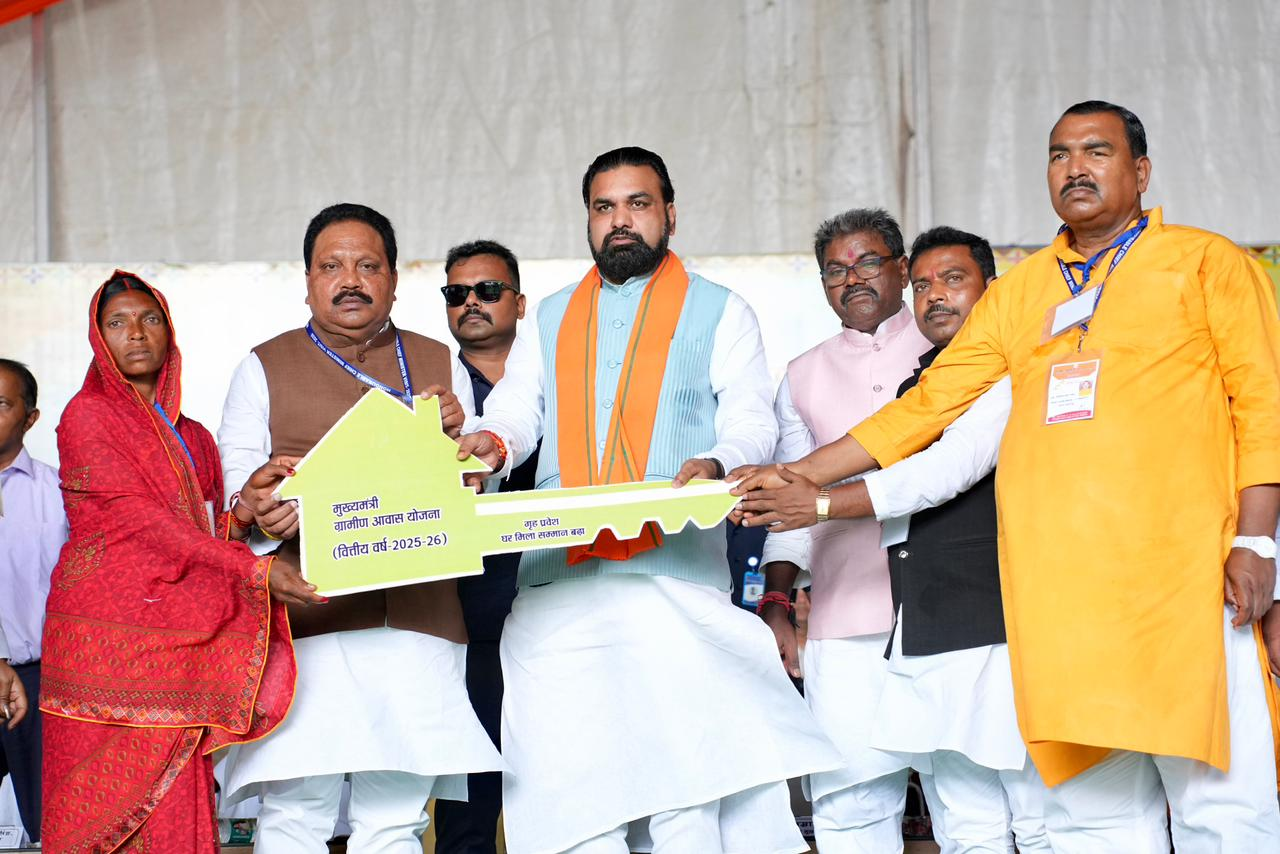
Mandal Participating in Chief Minister Assistance Program in Araira with CM Samrat Chaudhary and others.

Mandal first won from Araria Assembly constituency representing the Bhartiya Pragatisheel Party in the 1995 Bihar Legislative Assembly election. He polled 112,284 votes and won the seat with a vote share of 63.4 per cent. He retained the seat as an independent in the 2000 Bihar Legislative Assembly election.

Later, he won from Sikti Assembly constituency representing Bharatiya Janata Party ticket in the 2015 election as well as 2020 election. In between, he won the 2009 by election representing Lok Janshakti Party as the seat fell vacant following the election of the then sitting MLA Pradeep Kumar Singh to Araria (Lok Sabha constituency).
