= Dholbajja =

Village in Bihar, India

Dholbajja is a village in the Forbesganj subdivision of Araria district, in the state of Bihar, India. The Pin code is 854318.
