= Vidya Sagar Keshri =

Indian politician

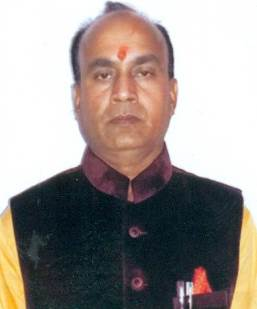

Member of Bihar Legislative Assembly
- In office 2015 - 2025
- Preceded by: Padam Parag Roy
- Succeeded by: Manoj Bishwas
- Constituency: Forbesganj

Personal details
- Born: 1 January 1962 (age 64)
- Party: Bharatiya Janata Party
- Occupation: Politician

Vidya Sagar Keshri is a politician, social worker and an educationist coming from town Forbesganj of Araria, Bihar. He was active as a student leader during his initial years in college politics. Later on, he got more and more involved in social work especially working in area of social upliftment of lower castes. He has been striving to create social harmony among different castes and for this purpose he runs an NGO named Sauharda Bharat, which is actively involved in organising intercaste festivals, mela and Pujas. He is a member of the Bharatiya Janata Party from Bihar. He has won the Bihar Legislative Assembly election in 2015 and 2020 from Forbesganj.
