= Forbesganj Assembly constituency =

Coordinates: 26°17′N 87°17′E

Forbesganj
- Constituency No. 48 - for the Bihar Legislative Assembly
- Forbesganj Vidhan sabha Constituency -048

Constituency details
- Country: India
- Region: East India
- State: Bihar
- District: Araria
- Lok Sabha constituency: Araria -09
- Established: 1951
- Total electors: 301,120
- Reservation: None

Member of Legislative Assembly
- 18th Bihar Legislative Assembly
- Incumbent Manoj Bishwas
- Party: INC
- Alliance: MGB
- Elected year: 2025

Each election in the Forbesganj Vidhansabha constituency has been won by a different political party (1952–2025).
1. INC (10 term) (52.6%)
2. BJP (7 term) (36.8%)
3. PSP (1 term) (5.26%)
4. BSP (1 term) (5.26%)

Forbesganj Assembly constituency is an assembly constituency in Araria district in the Indian state of Bihar. Vidyasagar Kesari is the MLA of Forbesganj assembly constituency elected in 2015 and 2020. Forbesganj Witnesses a Shift in Electoral Results Between 2024 and 2025

=== Forbesganj Assembly: BJP's Vote Margin Declines, INC Gains won Ground ===
In the 2024 Lok Sabha election, BJP candidate Pradeep Kumar Singh secured 1,26,457 votes, while RJD candidate Shahnawaz Alam received 87,254 votes in the Forbesganj Assembly segment.leading RJD by 39,203 votes

However, in the 2025 Bihar Assembly election, Congress candidate Manoj Biswas secured 1,20,114 votes, while BJP candidate Vidya Sagar Keshri received 1,19,893 votes. Manoj Biswas won by a narrow margin of 221 votes.

== History ==
As per Delimitation of Parliamentary and Assembly constituencies Order, 2008, No 48 Forbesganj Assembly constituency is composed of the following: Forbesganj community development block.

Forbesganj Assembly constituency is part of No 9 Araria (Lok Sabha constituency) .

In 2015 Bihar Legislative Assembly election, Forbesganj was one of the 36 seats to have VVPAT enabled electronic voting machines.

== Members of the Legislative Assembly ==
Year	Name	Party
1952	Bokai Mandal	Indian National Congress
1957	Dumar Lal Baitha	Indian National Congress
1957	Shital Prasad Gupta	Indian National Congress
1962	Saryu Mishra	Praja Socialist Party
1967	Saryu Mishra	Indian National Congress
1969	Saryu Mishra	Indian National Congress
1972	Saryu Mishra	Indian National Congress
1977	Saryu Mishra	Indian National Congress
1980	Saryu Mishra	Indian National Congress (I)
1985	Saryu Mishra	Indian National Congress
1990	Mayanand Thakur	Bharatiya Janata Party
1995	Mayanand Thakur	Bharatiya Janata Party
2000	Zakir Hussain Khan	Bahujan Samaj Party
2005	Laxmi Narayan Mehta	Bharatiya Janata Party
2005	Laxmi Narayan Mehta	Bharatiya Janata Party
2010	Padam Parag Roy	Bharatiya Janata Party
2015	Vidya Sagar Keshri	Bharatiya Janata Party
2020	Vidya Sagar Keshri	Bharatiya Janata Party
2025	Manoj Bishwas	Indian National Congress

== Election Results ==
=== 2025 ===
2025 Bihar Legislative Assembly election: Forbesganj
Party	Candidate	Votes	%	±%
INC	Manoj Bishwas	120,114	47.77	▲7.79
BJP	Vidya Sagar Keshri	119,893	47.68	▼1.85
NOTA	None of the above	3,114	1.24	▼0.38
Majority		221	0.09	▼9.46
Turnout		251,439	69.82	▲9.26
INC gain from BJP		Swing		

=== 2020 ===
2020 Bihar Legislative Assembly election: Forbesganj
Party	Candidate	Votes	%	±%
BJP	Vidya Sagar Keshri	102,212	49.53	+3.32
INC	Zakir Hussain Khan	82,510	39.98	
Independent	Pradeep Kumar Deo	6,452	3.13	
BSP	Raja Raman Bhaskar	5,818	2.82	+0.53
JAP(L)	Akhlaqur Rahman	2,207	1.07	−9.09
NOTA	None of the above	3,351	1.62	−0.22
Majority		19,702	9.55	−4.02
Turnout		206,372	60.56	−1.43
BJP hold		Swing		

=== 2015 ===
2015 Bihar Legislative Assembly election: Forbesganj
Party	Candidate	Votes	%	±%
BJP	Vidya Sagar Keshri	85,929	46.21	
RJD	Krityanand Biswas	60,691	32.64	
JAP(L)	Zakir Hussain Khan	18,894	10.16	
BSP	Laxmi Narayan Mehta	4,262	2.29	
Independent	Raja Raman Bhaskar	3,259	1.75	
NCP	Ashok Mishra	2,304	1.24	
Independent	Satya Narayan Writer	1,917	1.03	
NOTA	None of the above	3,428	1.84	
Majority		25,238	13.57	
Turnout		185,936	61.99	

=== 2010 ===
In the 2010 state assembly elections, Padam Parag Roy Venu of BJP won the Forbesganj assembly seat defeating his nearest rival Maya Nand Thakur of LJP. Contests in most years were multi cornered but only winners and runners up are being mentioned. Laxmi Narayan Mehta of BJP defeated Zakir Hussain Khan of RJD in October 2005 and February 2005. Zakir Hussain Khan representing BSP defeated Laxmi Narayan Mehta, Independent, in 2000. Mayanand Thakur representing BJP defeated Laxmi Narayan Mehta, Independent, in 1995, and Shital Prasad Gupta of Congress in 1990. Saryu Mishra of Congress defeated Rai Bahadur Keshri of BJP in 1985, Nakshtra Malakar of CPI in 1980 and Lal Chand Sahni of JP.

Vidyasagar Kesari was first elected in 2015 Bihar Legislative Assembly election, and re-elected in 2020 Bihar Legislative Assembly election.
