= Laxmi Narayan Mehta =

Indian politician

Laxmi Narayan Mehta is a former member of the Bihar Legislative Assembly from Bihar, India. He is from the Bharatiya Janata Party (BJP) and represents the Forbesganj Assembly constituency. Mehta is a member of Koeri community. In 2009 Indian general elections, Mehta expressed his discontent against the decision of the high command of the Bhartiya Janata Party, which decided not to field any candidate from the Koeri caste in the general elections of 2009. Mehta, in an interview to the print media, told that estimated population of his caste group was 9 percent in the state of Bihar. He further stressed that there are approximately 60,000 votes in each Parliamentary constituency of Bihar, belonging to people of his caste and hence they deserved representation in the seat sharing arrangement.
