= Sikti Assembly constituency =

Coordinates: 26°23′20″N 87°32′26″E

Sikti
- Constituency No. 51 for the Bihar Legislative Assembly

Constituency details
- Country: India
- Region: East India
- State: Bihar
- District: Araria
- Total electors: 301,120

Member of Legislative Assembly
- 18th Bihar Legislative Assembly
- Incumbent Vijay Kumar Mandal
- Party: BJP
- Alliance: NDA
- Elected year: 2025

Each election in the Sikti Vidhansabha constituency has been won by a different political party (1977–2025).
1. INC (3 term) (25.0%)
2. BJP (5 term) (41.7%)
3. JD (1 term) (8.33%)
4. JDU (1 term) (8.33%)
5. IND (2 term) (16.7%)

Sikti is an assembly constituency in Araria district in the Indian state of Bihar. The constituency is part of Araria Lok Sabha constituency.

Ten elections have been held here since it came into existence in 1977. Of these, Congress and BJP have been successful three times, independents twice, Janata Dal and Janata Dal United once each. Azimuddin was the MLA here five times in 1962, 1967, 1969, 1972 and 1977 respectively and became a minister four times. Congress veterans Sheetal Prasad Gupta and Rameshwar Yadav have also represented this area. As of 2020, Vijay Kumar Mandal of BJP is the MLA. Vijay Kumar Mandal has been made Disaster Minister in 2025.

== Sikti Assembly: BJP's Vote Margin Declines, VIP Gains Ground ==
In the 2024 Lok Sabha election, BJP secured 1,12,459 votes in Sikti, while RJD's Shahnawaz received 75,207 votes. In the 2025 Assembly election, BJP's Vijay Kumar Mandal secured 1,11,342 votes, while VIP's Hari Narayan Pramanik received 92,020 votes. Key Highlights: - BJP votes decreased by 1,117. - VIP received 16,813 more votes than RJD's 2024 tally. - BJP's winning margin dropped from 37,252 (2024) to 19,322 (2025).

Before 1977, most of this area was part of Palasi Assembly constituency.

== Extent of the constituency ==
As per Delimitation of Parliamentary and Assembly constituencies Order, 2008, Sikti Assembly constituency is composed of the following: Sikti and Kursakanta community development blocks; Balua Kaliyaganj, Baradbatta, Chouri, Dehti North, Dehti South, Dharamganj, Dighli, Kankhudia, Pipra Bijwar and Chahatpur gram panchayats of Palasi CD Block.

According to the 2011 Census, the Hindu population is higher in the Sikti and Kursakanta blocks, whereas in the Palasi block, the Muslim population is approximately equal.

Block	Hindu %	Muslim %	Other %
Kursakanta	74.79	24.92	0.29
Sikti	65.09	34.73	0.18
Palasi	51.09	48.46	0.45

== Members of the Legislative Assembly ==
Year	Name	Party
Before 1977: See Palasi
1977	Md Azimuddin	Independent
1980	Shital Prasad Gupta	Indian National Congress (I)
1985	Rameshwar Yadav	Indian National Congress
1990	Md Azimuddin	Janata Dal
1995	Rameshwar Yadav	Indian National Congress
2000	Anandi Prasad Yadav	Bharatiya Janata Party
2005	Murlidhar Mandal	Independent
2005	Murlidhar Mandal	Janata Dal (United)
2010	Anandi Prasad Yadav	Bharatiya Janata Party
2015	Vijay Kumar Mandal	Bharatiya Janata Party
2020	Vijay Kumar Mandal	Bharatiya Janata Party
2025	Vijay Kumar Mandal	Bharatiya Janata Party
2030		

== Election results ==
=== 2025 ===
2025 Bihar Legislative Assembly election: Sikti
Party	Candidate	Votes	%	±%
BJP	Vijay Kumar Mandal	111,342	50.56	▲3.64
VIP	Hari Narayan Pramanik	92,020	41.78	
JSP	Raghib Bablu	3,789	1.72	
BSP	Bhola Prasad Singh	3,357	1.52	
Peace Party (India)	Md Sabir Alam	2,211	1.0	
AAP	Dinesh Kumar Arya	2,210	1.0	
Prism Party	Jaynarayan Sada	2,204	1.0	
NOTA	None of the above	2,018	0.92	▼0.37
Majority		19,322	8.78	▲1.19
Turnout		220,229	72.74	▲10.5
BJP gain from VIP		Swing		

=== 2020 ===
2020 Bihar Legislative Assembly election: Sikti
Party	Candidate	Votes	%	±%
BJP	Vijay Kumar Mandal	84,128	46.92	▲0.44
RJD	Shatrughan Prasad Suman	70,518	39.33	
Independent	Abhishek Anand	6,839	3.81	
Independent	Md. Quamruzzama	4,515	2.52	
Independent	Rajesh Kumar Mishra	2,961	1.65	
NOTA	None of the above	2,310	1.29	▼1.16
Majority		13,610	7.59	▲2.7
Turnout		179,283	62.24	▼1.71
BJP gain from RJD		Swing		

=== 2015 ===
2015 Bihar Legislative Assembly election: Sikti
Party	Candidate	Votes	%	±%
BJP	Vijay Kumar Mandal	76,995	46.48	
JD(U)	Shatrughan Prasad Suman	68,889	41.59	
JAP(L)	Bal Krishna Jha	4,725	2.85	
NCP	Azimuddin	2,192	1.32	
Janta Dal Rashtravadi	Hatim	2,171	1.31	
BSP	Vinod Rishidev	1,853	1.12	
Independent	Veerendra Nath Mishra	1,563	0.94	
NOTA	None of the above	4,052	2.45	
Majority		8,106	4.89	
Turnout		165,656	63.95	
New All India Congress Party	Ashok Sah	563	0.34	New entry

=== 2010 ===
2010 Bihar Legislative Assembly election: Sikti
Party	Candidate	Votes	%	±%
BJP	Anandi Prasad Yadav	42076	31.18 %	▲20.58
LJP	Vijay Kumar Mandal	32202	23.86%	New entry
INC	Shagufta	20280	15.03%	New entry
Independent	Azimuddin	13509	10.01%	New entry
Independent	Murlidhar Mandal	12496	9.26%	▼25.78
Independent	Lukman	3969	2.9%	New entry
Independent	Mahendra Prasad Mandal	1,781	1.3%	New entry
Independent	Jai Narayan Sada	1780	1.3%	New entry
Independent	Paltu Mandal	1631	1.2%	New entry
BSP	Gopal Kumar Mandal	1545	1.1%	New entry
NCP	Mantu Bhagat	1328	1%	New entry
Independent	Kalpana Devi	1221	0.9%	New entry
SP	Farooqueahamad	1,139	0.8%	▼13.5
Majority		9874	7.3%	▲1.4
Turnout		134957	63.71 %	▲9.11
BJP gain from LJP		Swing		

=== 2005 ===
Feb 2005

February 2005 Bihar Legislative Assembly election: Sikti
Party	Candidate	Votes	%	±%
Independent	Murlidhar Mandal	32887	23.9%	
LJP	Aftab Azim	24710	18%	
Independent	Hasnain Mirza	20405	14.8%	
BJP	Anandi Prasad Yadav	14638	10.6%	
Independent	Md Murshid	10095	7.3%	
INC	Vijay Kumar Yadav	7698	5.6%	
RJD	Md Haidar	7092	5.2%	
Independent	Ranjeet Yadav	7078	5.1%	
Independent	Khushi Lal Sah	2,331	1.7%	
Independent	Khoshi Devi	2018	1.5%	
Independent	Deva Nand Mandal	1972	1.4%	
Independent	Jamil Akhtar	1854	1.4	
Independent	Shri Balak Das Rishi	1624	1.2%	
Independent	Dilip Kumar Yadav	1271	0.9%	
Independent	Mangal Kumar Ram	1095	0.8%	
Independent	Md. Ismail Azad	907	0.7%	
Majority		8177	5.9%	
Turnout		1,37,676	54.6%	
Independent gain from LJP		Swing		

=== 2000 ===
2000 Bihar Legislative Assembly election:Sikti
Party	Candidate	Votes	%	±%
BJP	Anandi Prasad Yadav	54981	37.28 %	
Independent	Md Azim Uddin	40798	27.66%	
RJD	Jamil Akhter	26225	17.78	
Ajeya Bharat Party	Jagar Nath Mandal	12087	8.19%	
INC	Rameshwar Yadav	4581	3.11%	
Bhartiya Jana Congress (rashtriya)	Murshid Alam	2549	1.73%	
NCP	Athar Hussain	1924	1.3%	
BSP	Ashok Choudhary	1253	0.9%	
Independent	Jaibadul Haque	1,055	0.7%	
Independent	Ishwar Chand Ray	962	0.7%	
Independent	Janardan Pd. Mandal	359	0.2%	
Independent	Lakshman Prasad Sah	319	0.2%	
Independent	Lukman	276	0.2%	
Independent	Anant Lal Mandal	128	0.1	
Majority		14183	9.5%	
Turnout		1,48,917	70.5%	
BJP gain from Independent		Swing		

=== 1995 ===
1995 Bihar Legislative Assembly election: Sikti
Party	Candidate	Votes	%	±%
INC	Rameshwar Yadav	34518	24.64%	
Independent	Jamil Akhtar	26244	18.73%	
JD	Md Azimuddin	25336	18.09%	
SP	Anandi Prasad Yadav	19022		
BJP	Jagdish Jaiswal	9608		
Majority		8274		
Turnout		140084	69.05 %	
INC gain from Independent		Swing		

=== 1990 ===
1990 Bihar Legislative Assembly election: Sikti
Party	Candidate	Votes	%	±%
JD	Md Azimuddin	38726	34.21%	
INC	Rameshwar Yadav	21300	18.82%	
Independent	Jagnnath Madal	11781	11.24%	
Independent	Rameshwar Pd Singh	19022	10.41%	
Independent	Anant Lal Mandal	5979	5.28%	
Independent	Md Jamil Akhatar	4976	4.4%	
Majority		17426		
Turnout		113198	63.13%	
JD gain from INC		Swing		

=== 1985 ===
1985 Bihar Legislative Assembly election: Sikti
Party	Candidate	Votes	%	±%
INC	Rameshwar Yadav	42775	46.93%	
LKD Lok Dal	Md Azimuddin	35289	38.72%	
BJP	Tara Chand	6697	7.35%	
Janta Party	Murli Dhar Mandal	4605	5.05%	
Independent	Nageshwar Thakur	1777	1.95%	
Majority		7486	8.2%	
Turnout		91143	61.56%	
INC gain from LKD Lok Dal		Swing		

=== 1980 ===
1980 Bihar Legislative Assembly election: Sikti
Party	Candidate	Votes	%	±%
INC	Shital Pd Gupta	35867	44.2%	
JNP(SC) Janata Party (Secular) Charan Singh	Md Azimuddin	27493	33.88%	
BJP	Abdul Qaumum	15655	19.29%	
Independent	Bande Lal Rishideo	1303	1.6%	
JNP(SR) Janata Party (Secular) Raj Narain	Gajendar Lal Sharma	822	1.01%	
Majority		8374	10.32	
Turnout		81138	60.82%	
INC gain from JNP(SC)Janata Party (secular)ch.charan singh		Swing		

=== 1977 ===
1977 Bihar Legislative Assembly election: Sikti
Party	Candidate	Votes	%	±%
Independent	Md Azimuddin	20323	30.21%	
INC	Maya Nand Thakur	10604	15.76%	
JP	Sushila Kappor	8314	12.36%	
Independent	Shayam Sundar Bishwas	6870	10.21%	
Independent	Murli Dhar Mandal	5185	7.71%	
Independent	Abdur Rahaman	5089	7.57%	
Independent	Kriti Narayan Sah	2935	4.36%	
Independent	Shiv Nandan Rai	1932	2.87%	
Independent	Qbiyum	1409	2.09%	
Independent	Md Muslim	1372	2.04%	
Independent	Bechan Ali	966	1.44%	
Independent	Gaya Suddin Ahmad	915	1.36%	
Independent	Mangatu Ram Khetan	844	1.25%	
Independent	Chandrika Prasad Mandal	506	0.75%	
Majority		9719	14.45	
Turnout		67264	60.03%	
Independent gain from INC		Swing		
