= Palasi Assembly constituency =

Coordinates: 26°14′N 87°34′E

Kishanganj
- Constituency for the Bihar Legislative Assembly

Constituency details
- Country: India
- Region: East India
- State: Bihar
- District: Kishanganj
- Lok Sabha constituency: Kishanganj
- Established: 1951
- Total electors: 62629 (62.42%)
- Reservation: None

Member of Legislative Assembly
- 18th Bihar Legislative Assembly
- Incumbent Maya Nand Thakur
- Party: INC
- Elected year: 1972

Palasi is a block and a notified area in Araria district in the Indian state of Bihar. This block is 28 km away from Araria (the district headquarters) and lies north-east direction. Most of the people are poor and educationally weak. There are 21 panchayat and 104 villages. This block is higher educational person. Their source of income are mainly agriculture. The population residing here is mainly Hindu and Muslim. The cause of the poverty is illiteracy and the recurrent floods in this area by Koshi and Bakra rivers. Palasi is now developing, and all the minimum needs of the people are fulfilled at Palasi block. Sukhsaina panchayat is the border of jokihat block balwa village are divided in three panchayat he is the clean village There is also a Primary Health Center that provides health services to a limited extent. As such, for serious ailments, people have to go to places like Purnia, Araria and Kishanganj.

== Palasi Demographic Profile ==
According to the 2011 Census, Palasi Block in Araria district has a nearly balanced religious population. Hindus constitute 51.09%, while Muslims account for 48.46% of the population. Other religious communities together make up a small share of the population. Religion Population Percentage Hindu 126,899 Muslim 120,349 Christian 262 Jain 165 Sikh 34 Buddhist 8 Other Religions 1 Religion Not Stated 651 Total 248,369

Block	Hindu %	Muslim %	Other %
Palasi	51.09	48.46	0.45

Each election in the Palasi Vidhansabha constituency has been won by a different political party (1952–1977).
1. INC (3 term) (50.0%)
2. IND (2 term) (33.3%)
3. SWP (1term) (16.7%)

== Members of the Legislative Assembly ==
Year	Name	Party
1952	PUNYANAND JHA	Indian National Congress
1957	Shanti Devi	INC
1962	Mohammad Azimuddin	Swatantra Party
1967	Mohammad Azimuddin	Independent politician
1969	Mohammad Azimuddin	Independent politician
1972	Maya Nand Thakur	Indian National Congress
From 1977:See Sikti Assembly constituency

== Election results ==
1972 Bihar Legislative Assembly election: PALASI
Party	Candidate	Votes	%	±%
INC	Maya Nand Thakur	28450	46.52	
Independent	Mohammad Azimuddin	23077	37.73	
Independent	VACHAN ALI	3,385	5.54	
ABJS	GAYNESHWAR YADAV	2,811	4.60	
Syndicate Congress	SHYAM NARAYAN	1,167	1.91	
SOP	DEO LAL ROY	1,001	1.64	
Independent	DABIRUDDIN	983	1.61	
Independent	SURYA MOHAN THAKUR	167	0.27	
SWA	HSAN	115	0.19	
Majority		5373	8.79%	
Turnout		62629	62.42%	
INC gain from Independent		Swing		

1969 Bihar Legislative Assembly election: PALASI
Party	Candidate	Votes	%	±%
Independent	Mohammad Azimuddin	18889	37.78	
ABJS	SHYAM SUNDAR BISWAS	14700	29.40	
INC	GULAB CHAND ROY	7,687	15.37	
SSP	LAL MOHAR MANDAL	4,354	8.71	
LTC	RAMANAND THAKUR	1,868	3.74	
PSP	BADRI NARAYAN MANDAL	1,752	3.50	
BKD	RAJABUL	750	1.50	
Majority		4189	8.38%	
Turnout		52022	58.67%	
Independent gain from ABJS		Swing		

1967 Bihar Legislative Assembly election: PALASI
Party	Candidate	Votes	%	±%
Independent	Mohammad Azimuddin	12580	29.49	
ABJS	SHYAM SUNDAR BISWAS	8241	19.32	
PSP	L.N. SINGH	5,392	12.64	
SSP	L.M. MANDAL	5,319	12.47	
INC	P.K. THAKUR	4,980	11.67	
Independent	K.N.JHA	3,335	7.82	
Independent	A. REHMAN	1,242	2.91	
ABJS	S. JMJAMAL	994	2.33	
SWA	G.L. VERMA	573	1.34	
Majority		4339	10.17%	
Turnout		46142	55.21%	
Independent gain from ABJS		Swing		

1962 Bihar Legislative Assembly election: PALASI
Party	Candidate	Votes	%	±%
SWA	Mohammad Azimuddin	15626	51.48	
INC	Shanti Devi	9177	30.33	
PSP	BADRI NARAIN MANDAL	5,553	18.29	
Independent				
Majority		6449	21.24%	
Turnout		32169	35.67%	
SWA gain from INC		Swing		

1957 Bihar Legislative Assembly election: PALASI
Party	Candidate	Votes	%	±%
INC	Shanti Devi	10126		
PSP	ABDUR RAZAQUE	8825		
Independent				
Majority		1301	4.95%	
Turnout		29293	36.00%	
INC gain from PSP		Swing		

1952 Bihar Legislative Assembly election: PALASI
Party	Candidate	Votes	%	±%
INC	PUNYANAND JHA	11252		
Socialist	RAJAQUE MOHAMMAD ABDUR	4296		
Independent				
Majority		6956	37.09%	
Turnout		18756	28.81%	
INC gain from Socialist		Swing		
