= Anil Kumar Yadav (politician, born 1960) =

Indian politician

Bihar Legislative Assembly
- In office 2015–2020
- Preceded by: Devanti Yadav
- Succeeded by: Jai Prakash Yadav
- Constituency: Narpatganj

Personal details
- Born: 24 March 1960 (age 66) Khajuri, Araria, Bihar
- Party: Rashtriya Janata Dal
- Parent: Singheshwar Prasad Yadav
- Education: Bachelor of Arts
- Occupation: Farmer, Business
- Profession: Politician

Anil Kumar Yadav is an Indian politician and a member of Bihar Legislative Assembly of India.

== Career ==
He used to represent the Narpatganj constituency in the Araria district of Bihar. He was elected in February 2005, 2015 as a member of Rashtriya Janata Dal. He entered politics in 1974 and he also participated in the 1978 emergency. In 2020, he lost to Jai Prakash Yadav of BJP. He was elected in February 2005 as member of Bihar Legislative Assembly. He was elected two times for Bhargama block Pramukh. He was elected as chairman of Krishi Udpadan Bazar Samiti Forbisganj in 2004.
