= Jokihat Assembly constituency =

Coordinates: 26°08′01″N 87°36′35″E

Jokihat
- Constituency No. 50 for the Bihar Legislative Assembly

Constituency details
- Country: India
- Region: East India
- State: Bihar
- District: Araria
- Lok Sabha constituency: Araria
- Established: 1967
- Total electors: 301,120
- Reservation: None

Member of Legislative Assembly
- 18th Bihar Legislative Assembly
- Incumbent Mohammad Murshid Alam
- Party: AIMIM
- Alliance: None
- Elected year: 2020

Jokihat Assembly constituency is an assembly constituency in Araria district in the Indian state of Bihar

Each election in the Raniganj Vidhansabha constituency has been won by a different political party (1967–2025).
1. JDU (4 term) (23.5%)
2. INC (2 term) (11.8%)
3. RJD (2 term) (11.8%)
4. AIMIM (2 term) (11.8%)
5. IND (2 term) (11.8%)
6. SP (1 term) (5.88%)
7. PSP (1 term) (5.88%)
8. JD (1 term) (5.88%)
9. JP (1 term) (5.88%)
10. JPS (1 term) (5.88%)

== Overview ==
As per Delimitation of Parliamentary and Assembly constituencies Order, 2008, No 50 Jokihat Assembly constituency is composed of the following: Jokihat community development block; Barahkumba, Bhikha, Nakta Khurd, Pakri, Pechaili, Ramnagar, Sohandar, Suksaina, Majlispur, Kujri and Miyanpur gram panchayats of Palasi CD Block.

== Jokihat: RJD's Vote Share Sees a Major Decline in 2025 Assembly Election ==
In the 2024 Lok Sabha election, RJD candidate Shahnawaz Alam received 1,21,794 votes in the Jokihat Assembly segment, while BJP candidate Pradeep Kumar Singh secured 56,826 votes. RJD led by 64,968 votes.

However, in the 2025 Bihar Assembly election, AIMIM candidate Mohammad Murshid Alam secured 83,737 votes, while JD(U)'s Manzar Alam received 54,934 votes. RJD candidate Mohammad Shahnawaz Alam received only 29,659 votes.

AIMIM won the seat by 28,803 votes.

Notably, RJD's vote tally declined by 92,135 votes compared with its 2024 Lok Sabha performance in this Assembly segment.

Jokihat Assembly constituency is part of No 9 Araria (Lok Sabha constituency) (SC).

== Members of the Legislative Assembly ==
Year	Name	Party
1967	Nazamuddin	Praja Socialist Party
1969	Mohammed Taslimuddin	Indian National Congress
1972	Mohammed Taslimuddin	Independent
1977	Mohammed Taslimuddin	Janata Party
1980	Moidur Rehman	Indian National Congress (I)
1985	Mohammed Taslimuddin	Janata Party (Secular)
1990	Moidur Rahman	Independent
1995	Mohammed Taslimuddin	Samajwadi Party
1996^	Sarfaraz Alam	Janata Dal
2000	Sarfaraz Alam	Rashtriya Janata Dal
2005	Manzar Alam	Janata Dal (United)
2005	Manzar Alam	Janata Dal (United)
2010	Sarfaraz Alam	Janata Dal (United)
2015	Sarfaraz Alam	Janata Dal (United)
2018^	Mohammed Shahnawaz Alam	Rashtriya Janata Dal
2020	Mohammed Shahnawaz Alam	All India Majlis-e-Ittehadul Muslimeen
2020	Mohammed Shahnawaz Alam	Rashtriya Janata Dal
2025	Mohammad Murshid Alam	All India Majlis-e-Ittehadul Muslimeen

^by-election

== Election results ==
=== 2025 ===
Bihar Assembly election, 2025: Jokihat
Party	Candidate	Votes	%	±%
AIMIM	Mohammad Murshid Alam	83,737	38.52	▲4.3
JD(U)	Manzar Alam	54,934	25.27	
JSP	Sarfaraz Alam	35,354	16.26	
RJD	Mohammed Shahnawaz Alam	29,659	13.64	▼16.34
Bharatiya Momin Front	Md Ismail	4,137	1.9	
Rashtriya Jansambhavna Party	Musarrat	2,609	1.2	
NOTA	None of the above	4,003	1.84	▲0.21
Majority		28,803	13.25	▲9.01
Turnout		217,385	71.55	▲12.19
AIMIM hold		Swing		

=== 2020 ===
Bihar Assembly election, 2020: Jokihat
Party	Candidate	Votes	%	±%
AIMIM	Mohammed Shahnawaz Alam	59,596	34.22	
RJD	Sarfaraz Alam	52,213	29.98	
BJP	Ranjit Yadav	48,933	28.1	
Independent	Saba Perween	3,696	2.12	
SDPI	Md Shabbir Ahmad	2,350	1.35	▲0.62
NOTA	None of the above	2,844	1.63	▼1.77
Majority		7,383	4.24	▼29.81
Turnout		174,138	59.36	▼2.17
AIMIM gain from JD(U)		Swing		

=== 2015 ===
2015 Bihar Legislative Assembly election: Jokihat
Party	Candidate	Votes	%	±%
JD(U)	Sarfaraz Alam	92,890	58.6	
Independent	Ranjit Yadav	38,910	24.55	
JAP(L)	Kausar Zia	5,499	3.47	
HAM(S)	Bibi Zeba Khatun	4,206	2.65	
Independent	Maha Nand Bishwas	2,557	1.61	
Independent	Sanjay Kumar Thakur	2,157	1.36	
BSP	Sarfuddin	1,593	1.01	
NOTA	None of the above	5,388	3.4	
Majority		53,980	34.05	
Turnout		158,505	61.53	
