= Bhargama (community development block) =

Community development block in Araria district, Bihar, India

- CD Block
- Country: India
- State: Bihar
- Region: Mithila
- District: Araria
- Subdivision: Forbesganj
- Headquarters: Bhargama (town)

Government
  - Type: Community development
  - Body: Araria Block

Languages
  - Official: Hindi, Urdu, English
  - Regional: Maithili
- Time zone: UTC+5:30 (IST)

Bhargama is a Community development block and a town in district of Araria, in Mithila region, in Bihar state of India. It is one out of 3 blocks of Forbesganj subdivision. The headquarter of the block is at Bhargama town.

The block is divided into many Village Councils and villages.

== Administration and politics ==
Narpatganj (Vidhan Sabha constituency) is the assembly constituency for the block. Jai Prakash Yadav (BJP) elected in 2020 is the MLA.

== Gram Panchayats ==
There are many gram panchayats of Bhargama block in Forbesganj subdivision, Araria district.

== Education ==
Jawahar High school is located in the block.

== See also ==
- Administration in Bihar
