= Pradeep Singh (politician) =

Indian politician

Member of Parliament, Lok Sabha
- Incumbent
- Assumed office 23 May 2019
- Preceded by: Sarfaraz Alam
- Constituency: Araria
- In office May 2009 – May 2014
- Preceded by: Sukdeo Paswan
- Succeeded by: Mohammed Taslimuddin
- Constituency: Araria

Member of Bihar Legislative Assembly
- In office 2005–2009
- Preceded by: Vijay Kumar Mandal
- Succeeded by: Vijay Kumar Mandal
- Constituency: Araria

Personal details
- Born: 29 December 1964 (age 61) Kauvachar, Bihar, India
- Party: Bharatiya Janata Party
- Spouse: Mrs.Manju Singh (m. 1990)
- Children: 4 Daughters (in the educational/professional fields of Medicine, Business, Law and Journalism
- Profession: Agriculturist & Businessperson

Pradeep Singh (born 29 December 1964) is an Indian politician and a member of the Bhartiya Janata Party (BJP) serving as the Member of parliament (MP) in the Loksabha from Araria, Bihar. He has been a prominent representative for the region, winning the Araria Lok Sabha constituency seat multiple times, including in 2009 Indian general election, 2019 Indian general election, and 2024 Indian general election. Previously, He served as an MLA in Bihar Legislative Assembly twice in 2005 until 2009, when he moved to national politics and was elected as a Member of Parliament for the first time in Parliament of India.

== Parliamentary positions and committee involvement ==
Singh first entered the Lok Sabha as a member of the 15th Lok Sabha, representing the Araria constituency in Bihar after winning the election on 16 May 2009. During this term, he served on the Committee on Health and Family Welfare from 2009 until the end of the term in 2014. He also held membership in the Consultative Committee of the Ministry of Social Justice and Empowerment from 2010 to 2013.

Singh was re-elected to the 17th Lok Sabha from Araria on 23 May 2019. In this term, he was appointed to the Standing Committee on Chemicals and Fertilisers on 13 September 2019, a position he retained into subsequent parliamentary activities.

Following his victory in the 2024 Indian general election, Singh assumed office in the 18th Lok Sabha on 5 June 2024. He joined the Consultative Committee of the Ministry of Petroleum and Natural Gas in June 2024 and the Committee on Industry on 26 September 2024. Additionally, he serves on the Consultative Committee for the Ministry of Jal Shakti.

== Early life and education ==
Pradeep Singh was born on 29 December 1964 in Kauvachar, located in Forbesganj, Araria. His father, the late Ram Lal Singh (also known as Ram Lal Snehi), worked as a teacher and littérateur, earning a posthumous President's Award Rashtrapati Award for distinguished literary contributions.

Singh was raised in the rural environs of Araria district, where his family's emphasis on education and literature likely influenced his formative years; he exhibited an early inclination toward social service, joining the Rashtriya Swayamsevak Sangh after completing basic schooling. He began his public life as a member of the RSS before transitioning into electoral politics as a member of the Bihar Legislative Assembly in 2005.

== Electoral History ==
Pradeep Singh first entered elected office in the October-November 2005 Bihar Legislative Assembly winning the Araria constituency seat as a BJP candidate.

In the 2009 Lok Sabha elections, Singh secured victory in the Araria parliamentary constituency for the BJP, polling 282,742 votes (38.7% of valid votes) to defeat the Lok Janshakti Party's Zakir Hussain Khan, who received 260,240 votes (35.6%).

Singh contested the Araria seat again in the 2014 Lok Sabha elections but lost to Rashtriya Janata Dal candidate Mohammed Taslimuddin.

He reclaimed the Araria parliamentary seat in the 2019 Indian general elections, winning for the BJP with 618,434 votes (52.9% of valid votes) against Rashtriya Janata Dal's Sarfaraz Alam, who garnered 481,193 votes (41.1%).

Singh retained the Araria Lok Sabha constituency in the 2024 Indian general election, securing 600,146 total votes (including 599,118 electronic votes and 1,028 postal votes) as the BJP nominee to defeat the Rashtriya Janata Dal's Mohammed Shahnawaz Alam.

== Key initiatives in constituency development ==
Pradeep Singh has prioritized agricultural infrastructure in Araria, a key maize-producing district, by advocating for the establishment of maize-based industries and dedicated purchase and storage centers to enhance farmer incomes and reduce post-harvest losses. On July 24, 2024, he raised this issue in the Lok Sabha under Rule 377, emphasizing the need for industrial setup to process local produce and support economic growth in the constituency.

In infrastructure development, Singh has pushed for accelerated road connectivity, including the completion of pending construction works across Araria to improve transportation and access in rural areas. He highlighted these gaps in parliamentary interventions during his tenure, aligning with broader efforts to address the district's underdeveloped road network amid its flood-prone terrain.

Singh has also sought enhanced aviation infrastructure by inquiring about plans for airport construction in Araria, aiming to boost connectivity for a border district with Nepal, facilitate trade, and attract investment. This initiative, raised in Lok Sabha questions, targets long-term economic upliftment in a region marked by high poverty rates.

Singh has used his platform in the Lok Sabha to raise Matter of public importance related to farmers, highlighting the scarcity of essential fertilisers like DAP and potash and demanding immediate government intervention for their availability.

He is a key political voice for the Extremely Backward Class (EBC) in Bihar, particularly for the Gangai community, and often advocates for the revitalisation of the co-operative banks to empower local rural economies.
