= Araria district =

District in Bihar, India

- District
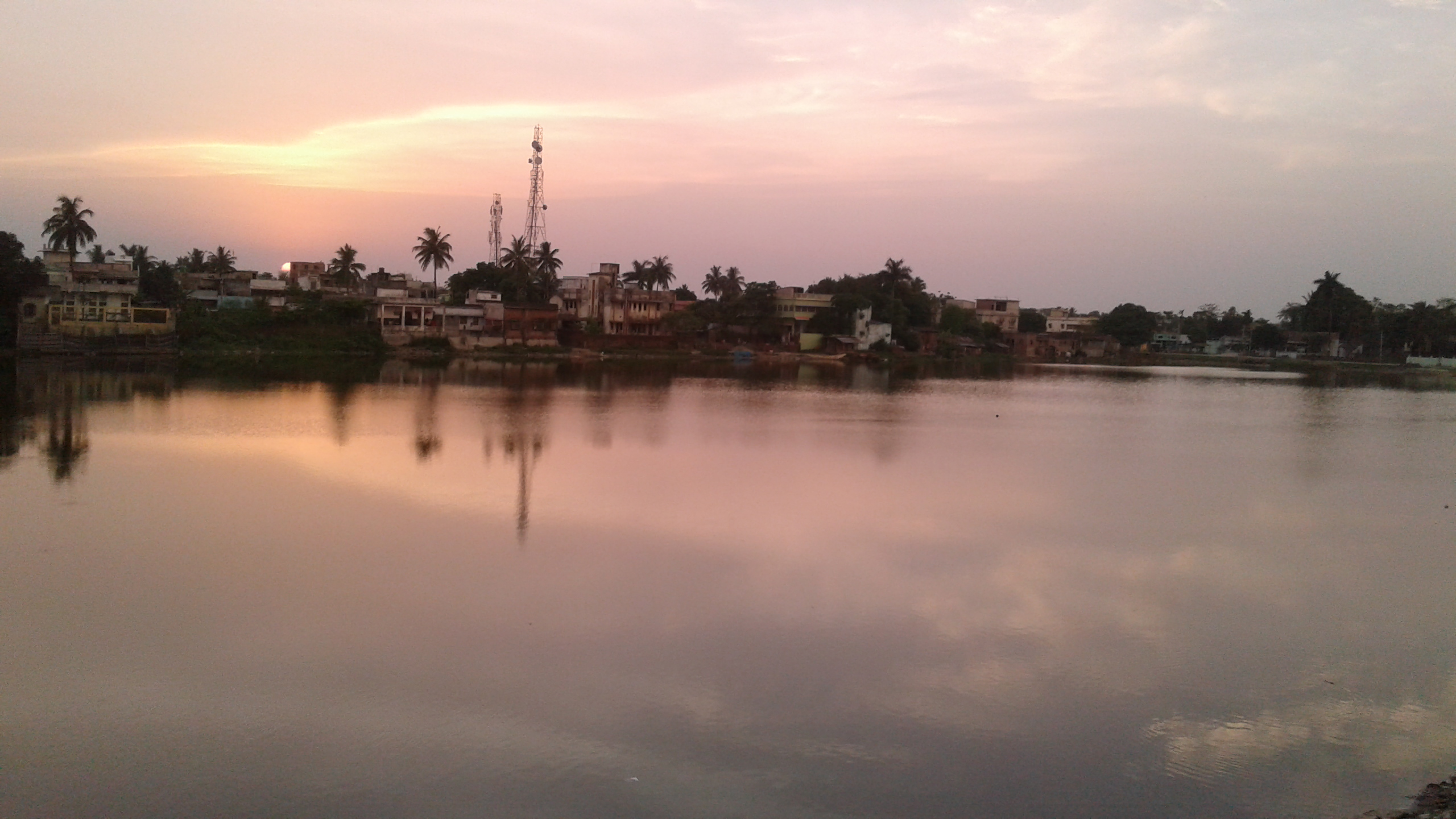
- Sunset at Sultan Pokhar, Forbesganj
- Interactive map of Araria district
- Country: India
- State: Bihar
- Region: Mithila
- Division: Purnia
- Established: 14 Jan 1990
- Headquarters: Araria

Government
  - Lok Sabha constituencies: Araria
  - Vidhan Sabha constituencies: Narpatganj, Raniganj, Forbesganj, Araria, Jokihat, Sikti

Area
  - Total: 2,830 km^{2} (1,090 sq mi)

Population (2011)
  - Total: 2,811,569
  - Density: 993/km^{2} (2,570/sq mi)

Demographics
  - Literacy: 53.53%(2011)
  - Sex ratio: 921 females for every 1000 males
- Time zone: UTC+05:30 (IST)
- Major highways: NH 27
- HDI (2016): ▲0.251 (low)
- Website: araria.nic.in

Araria district is one of the thirty-eight districts of Bihar state, India. Araria district is a part of Purnia division. The district occupies an area of 2,830 km^{2} (1,090 sq mi). Araria town is the administrative headquarters of this district. The Indo–Nepal border is about 8 km from Forbesganj headquarters.

== Etymology ==
During the British Raj, the area was under the administration of a British district collector and municipal commissioner, Alexander John Forbes (1807-1890) of East India Company. Forbes had a bungalow at the same location. Consequently, the area was known as 'residential area' also abbreviated as 'R-area'. Over time, the name transformed to 'Araria' and the neighbouring subdivision came to be known as 'Forbesganj'.

== History ==
Araria district is a part of the Mithila region. Mithila first gained prominence after being settled by Indo-Aryan peoples who established the Mithila Kingdom (also called Kingdom of the Videhas).

During the late Vedic period (c. 1100–500 BCE), Kingdom of the Videhas became one of the major political and cultural centers of South Asia, along with Kuru and Pañcāla. The kings of the Kingdom of the Videhas were called Janakas. The Mithila Kingdom was later incorporated into the Vajjika League, which had its capital in the city of Vaishali, which is also in Mithila. The territory of the district became Araria sub-division of the former Purnia district in 1964. Araria district was formed in January 1990 as one of the administrative districts of under Purnia Division.

=== 2017 North Bihar Floods ===
2017 Floods affected 19 districts of North Bihar causing death of 514 people, in which Araria district accounted for 95 deaths alone. Floods have claimed 215 lives in Araria over 18 years, of which 61 in 2016.

== Geography ==
Araria district occupies an area of 2,830 square kilometres (1,090 sq mi).

National Highway 27 runs through the district.

== Politics ==
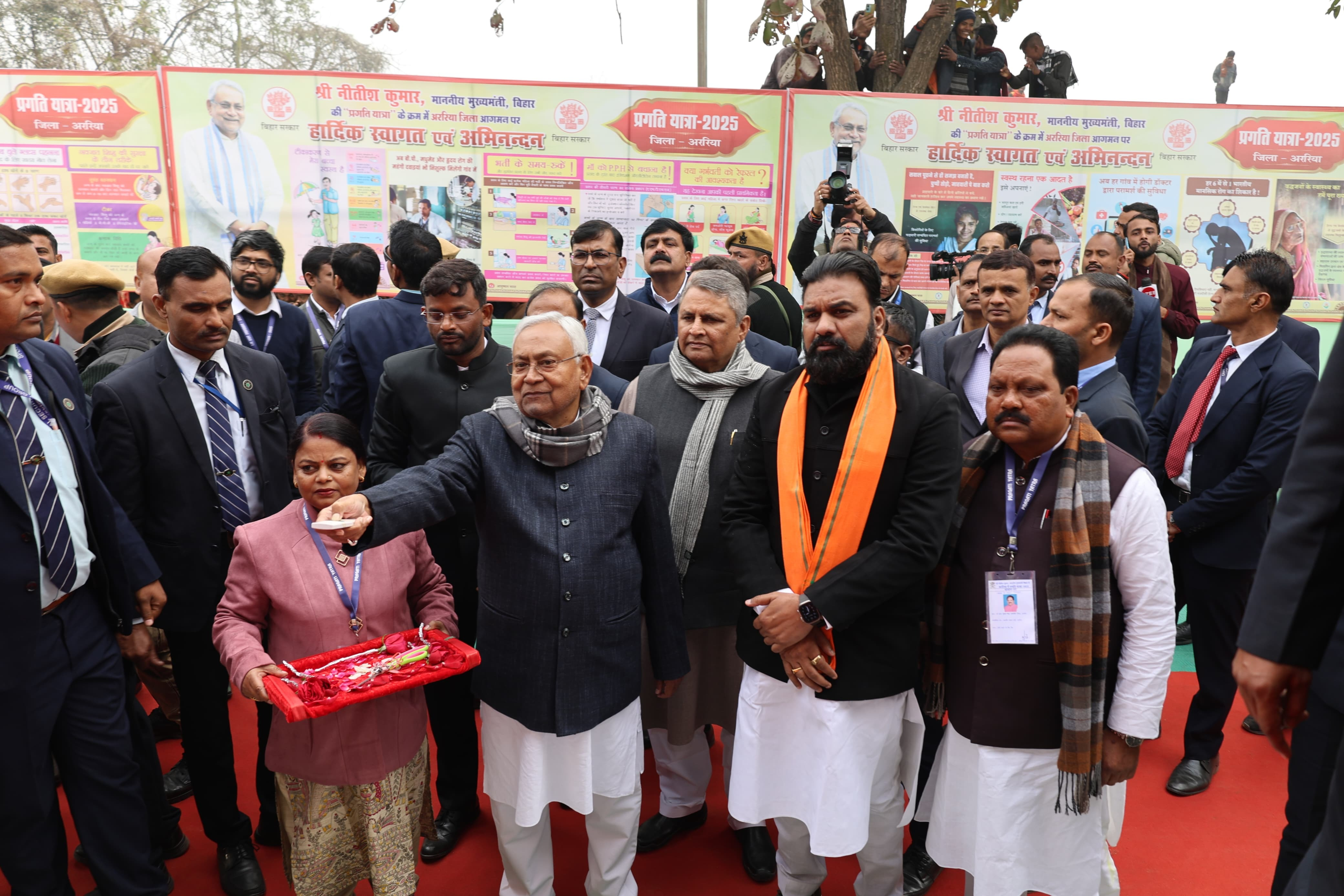
Nitish Kumar, Samrat Chaudhary and Araria MP Pradeep Kumar Singh inaugurating various schemes in Araria.

District	No.	Constituency	Name	Party	Alliance	Remarks
Araria	46	Narpatganj	Devanti Yadav	BJP	NDA	
Araria	47	Raniganj (SC)	Avinash Mangalam	RJD	MGB	
Araria	48	Forbesganj	Manoj Bishwas	INC	MGB	
Araria	49	Araria	Avidur Rahman	INC	MGB	
Araria	50	Jokihat	Mohammad Murshid Alam	AIMIM	None	
Araria	51	Sikti	Vijay Kumar Mandal	BJP	NDA	

== Economy ==
In 2006 the Indian government named Araria one of the country's 250 most backward districts (out of a total of 640) and it is also in the list of 112 aspirational districts of India by NITI Aayog. It is one of the 36 districts in Bihar receiving funds from the Backward Regions Grant Fund Programme (BRGF).

== Demographics ==
Historical population
Year	Pop.	±% p.a.
1901	374,909	—
1911	402,864	+0.72%
1921	430,193	+0.66%
1931	465,311	+0.79%
1941	506,546	+0.85%
1951	537,600	+0.60%
1961	779,578	+3.79%
1971	994,586	+2.47%
1981	1,272,151	+2.49%
1991	1,611,638	+2.39%
2001	2,158,608	+2.97%
2011	2,811,569	+2.68%

According to the 2011 census Araria district has a population of 2,811,569, roughly equal to the nation of Jamaica or the US state of Utah. This gives it a ranking of 139th in India (out of a total of 640). The district has a population density of992 inhabitants per square kilometre (2,570/sq mi) . Its population growth rate over the decade 2001-2011 was 30%. Araria has a sex ratio of 921 females for every 1000 males, and a literacy rate of 55.1%. 6.00% of the population lives in urban areas. Scheduled Castes and Scheduled Tribes make up 13.61% and 1.38% of the population respectively.

Religions in Araria district (2011)
Religion	Percent
Hinduism	56.68%
Islam	42.95%
Other or not stated	0.37%

Hinduism is the majority religion. Muslims are majority in Araria and Jokihat blocks, and are in near-majority in Palasi block.

Block	Hindu %	Muslim %	Other %
Narpatganj	70.45	29.23	0.32
Forbesganj	62.56	36.99	0.45
Bhargama	75.26	24.52	0.22
Raniganj	69.09	30.3	0.61
Araria	39.01	60.61	0.38
Kursakatta	74.79	24.92	0.29
Sikti	65.09	34.73	0.18
Palasi	51.09	48.46	0.45
Jokihat	21.39	78.38	0.23

Languages in Araria district (2011)
1. Urdu (28.7%)
2. Hindi (25.1%)
3. Maithili (20.6%)
4. 'Other' Hindi (16.4%)
5. Bengali (2.17%)
6. Kulhaiya (2.10%)
7. Surjapuri (1.91%)
8. Santali (1.05%)
9. Others (2.01%)

At the time of the 2011 Census of India, 28.71% Urdu, 25.05% Hindi, 20.57% Maithili, 2.17% Bengali, 2.10% Kulhaiya, 1.91% Surjapuri and 1.05% Santali as their first language. The main language is Maithili, mainly the Thethi and Eastern Maithili dialects, although most people record their language as Hindi or Urdu in the census. There is a presence of Surjapuri speakers in Sikti and Palasi, and Kulhaiya is a major Maithili dialect spoken by the Kulhaiya Muslim community in this district.

== Administration ==
The district is divided into two subdivisions, Forbesganj subdivision and Araria subdivision.

== Notable people ==
- Phanishwar Nath 'Renu', novelist and story writer.
- Family of Mohammed Taslimuddin
  - Mohammed Taslimuddin Former Union Minister of State
  - Mohammed Shahnawaz Alam, Indian politician and MLA
  - Sarfaraz Alam, Indian politician and MLA
- Subrata Roy, chairman of Sahara Group
- Quaiser Khalid IPS, Maharashtra Cadre, Poet, Educationist

== See also ==
- Districts of Bihar
- Araria Lok Sabha constituency
