= Narpat Singh Rajpurohit =

Indian environmentalist

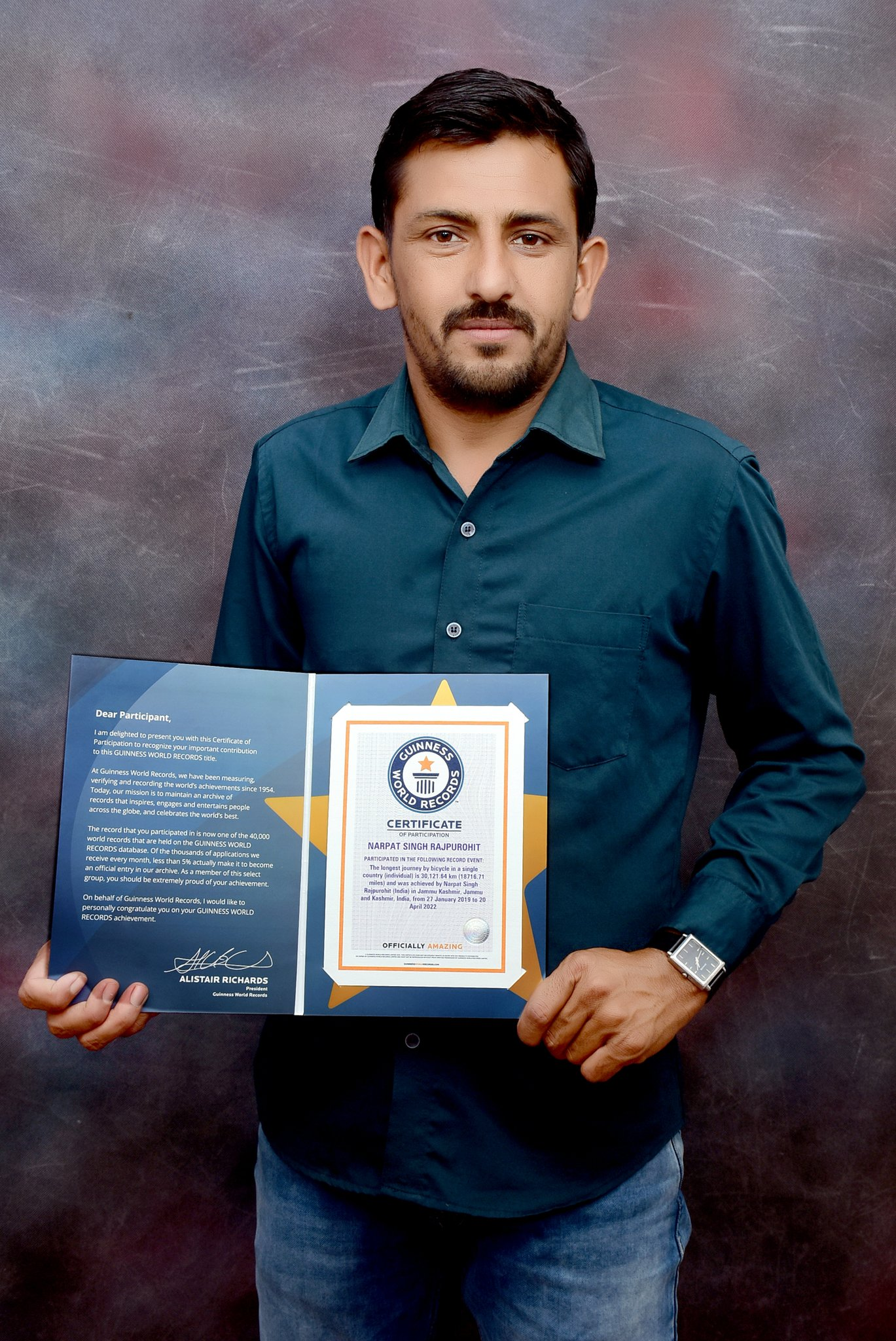
- Born: Barmer, Rajasthan, India
- Occupation(s): Social worker and environmentalist

Narpat Singh Rajpurohit, also known as Greenman, is an Indian social worker, cyclist and environmentalist. He was born in Barmer district of Rajasthan.

He started his cycle journey from Jammu Airport on 27 January 2019 and completed the journey in Jaipur on 20 April 2022. On April 20, 2022, he registered his name in the Guinness World Records by completing the longest journey of 30,121.64 kilometers by cycle in a single country.
