= Araria Assembly constituency =

Coordinates: 26°08′N 87°28′E

Araria
- Constituency No. 49 for the Bihar Legislative Assembly

Constituency details
- Country: India
- Region: East India
- State: Bihar
- District: Araria
- Lok Sabha constituency: Araria
- Established: 1951
- Total electors: 301,120
- Reservation: None

Member of Legislative Assembly
- 18th Bihar Legislative Assembly
- Incumbent Avidur Rahaman
- Party: INC
- Alliance: MGB
- Elected year: 2025

Each election in the Araria Vidhansabha constituency has been won by a different political party (1952–2025).
1. INC (8 term) (42.1%)
2. BJP (2 term) (10.5%)
3. SSP (1 term) (5.26%)
4. JP(S) (1 term) (5.26%)
5. BPP (1 term) (5.26%)
6. LJP (2 term) (10.5%)
7. IND (4 term) (21.1%)

Araria Assembly constituency is an assembly constituency in Araria district in the Indian state of Bihar.

== Overview ==
As per Delimitation of Parliamentary and Assembly constituencies Order, 2008, No 49 Araria Assembly constituency is composed of the following: Araria (community development block) including Araria nagar parishad.

== Araria: Congress Retains Seat as Election Results Show a Major Shift in Vote Figures ==
In the 2024 Lok Sabha election, BJP candidate Pradeep Kumar Singh secured 74,655 votes in the Araria Assembly segment, while RJD candidate Shahnawaz received 1,22,933 votes. RJD led by 48,278 votes.

In the 2025 Bihar Assembly election, Congress candidate Abidur Rahman secured 91,529 votes, while JD(U) candidate Shagufta Azim received 78,788 votes.

Abidur Rahman won by a margin of 12,741 votes.

Araria Assembly constituency is part of No 9 Araria (Lok Sabha constituency) (SC).

== Members of the Legislative Assembly ==
Year	Name	Party
1952	Ziaur Rahman Hazi	Independent
1957	Ziaur Rahman Hazi	Indian National Congress
1962	Balkrishna Jha	Independent
1967	Shital Prasad Gupta	Indian National Congress
1969	Shital Prasad Gupta	Indian National Congress
1972	Azam	Samyukta Socialist Party
1977	Srideo Jha	Indian National Congress
1980	Taslimuddin	Janata Party (Secular)
1985	Halimuddin Ahmed	Indian National Congress
1990	Vinod Kumar Roy	Independent
1995	Vijay Kumar Mandal	Bihar People's Party
2000	Vijay Kumar Mandal	Independent
2005	Pradeep Kumar Singh	Bharatiya Janata Party
2005	Pradeep Kumar Singh	Bharatiya Janata Party
2009^	Vijay Kumar Mandal	Lok Janshakti Party
2010	Zakir Hussain Khan	Lok Janshakti Party
2015	Avidur Rahman	Indian National Congress
2020	Avidur Rahman	Indian National Congress
2025	Avidur Rahman	Indian National Congress

^by-election

== Election results ==
=== 2025 ===
Bihar Assembly election, 2025: Araria
Party	Candidate	Votes	%	±%
INC	Avidur Rahman	91,529	37.81	−17.03
JD(U)	Shagufta Azim	78,788	32.55	+3.22
AIMIM	Md. Manzoor Alam	53,421	22.07	+17.32
Independent	Shivdeep W Lande	4,085	1.69	
JSP	Farhat Ara Begum	2,434	1.01	
RUC	Md. Rashid Anwer	2,351	0.97	
AAP	Chandra Bhushan	2,224	0.92	
NOTA	None of the above	3,610	1.49	−0.86
Majority		12,741	5.26	−20.25
Turnout		242,085	72.34	+13.43
INC hold		Swing		

=== 2020 ===
Bihar Assembly election, 2020: Araria
Party	Candidate	Votes	%	±%
INC	Avidur Rahman	103,054	54.84	+2.07
JD(U)	Shagufta Azim	55,118	29.33	
AIMIM	Md. Rashid Anwer	8,924	4.75	
LJP	Chandra Shekhar Singh Baban	8,203	4.37	−25.6
The Plurals Party	Amit Anand Jha	1,802	0.96	
NOTA	None of the above	4,425	2.35	+0.12
Majority		47,936	25.51	+2.71
Turnout		187,908	58.91	−4.29
INC hold		Swing		

=== 2015 ===
2015 Bihar Legislative Assembly election: Araria constituency
Party	Candidate	Votes	%	±%
INC	Avidur Rahman	92,667	52.77	
LJP	Ajay Kumar Jha	52,623	29.97	
CPI	Captain S. R. Jha	5,898	3.36	
JAP(L)	Haider Yasin	4,862	2.77	
SP	Shad Ahmad	3,377	1.92	
Independent	Vijay Kumar Mishra	3,113	1.77	
Independent	Md. Sarvar Alam	2,714	1.55	
Independent	Vinod Kumar	2,344	1.33	
NOTA	None of the above	3,924	2.23	
Majority		40,044	22.8	
Turnout		175,608	63.2	

=== 2010 ===
In the November 2010 state assembly elections, Zakir Hussain Khan of LJP won the Araria assembly seat defeating his nearest rival Narayan Kumar Jha of BJP. Contests in most years were multi cornered but only winners and runners up are being mentioned. Pradeep Kumar Singh of BJP defeated Moidur Rahman of Congress in October 2005 and February 2005. Vijay Kumar Mandal, Independent, defeated Moidur Rahman of Congress in 2000. Vijay Kumar Mandal of BPP defeated Durga Das Rathore of BJP in 1995. Vinod Kumar Roy, Independent, defeated Nand Kishore Mandal, Independent, in 1990. Halimuddin Ahmed of Congress defeated Nand Kishore Mandal of LD in 1985. Mohd. Taslimuddin of Janata Party (Secular – Charan Singh) defeated Shrideo Jha of Congress in 1980. Srideo Jha of Congress defeated Deo Narayan Mishra of JP in 1977.
