= Devanti Yadav =

Indian politician

Member of the Bihar Legislative Assembly
- Incumbent
- Assumed office 14 November 2025
- Preceded by: Jai Prakash Yadav
- Constituency: Narpatganj
- In office 26 November 2010 – 20 November 2015
- Preceded by: Janardan Yadav
- Succeeded by: Anil Kumar Yadav
- Constituency: Narpatganj

Personal details
- Party: Bharatiya Janata Party
- Profession: Politician

Devanti Yadav is an Indian politician from Bihar. She was elected as a Member of Legislative Assembly in 2025 Bihar Legislative Assembly election, representing the Narpatganj Assembly constituency in Araria district. She is a member of the Bharatiya Janata Party.
