= Narpath =

Indian mentalist

- Born: Narpath Raman; Tiruchirappalli
- Occupation: Mentalist

Narpath Raman (better known as Narpath-Next Door Mind Reader) is an Indian mentalist. He's the mentalist to be named as one of the top 20 inspiring men in 2017.

Narpath did his BE in Mechanical engineering from Hindustan Institute of Technology and Science, Chennai. He has worked as management consultant in a reputed company and quit his job at the age on 23 to become a street performer and then started performing on the streets in Bangalore, Karnataka.

Narpath's first mind-reading show was held at Rangasthala Auditorium at MG Road, Bengaluru.

Though Narpath has worked with many notable personalities but he came into the limelight in 2018 when he astonished Mahendra Singh Dhoni revealing his first crush to the entire world in an event in Jaipur.
