= Mohammad Murshid Alam =

Indian politician

Member of Bihar Legislative Assembly
- Incumbent
- Assumed office 2025
- Preceded by: Mohammed Shahnawaz Alam
- Constituency: Jokihat

Personal details
- Party: All India Majlis-e-Ittehadul Muslimeen

Mohammad Murshid Alam is an Indian politician from All India Majlis-e-Ittehadul Muslimeen and a member of Bihar Legislative Assembly from Jokihat Assembly constituency seat.
