= Narpatganj (community development block) =

Community development block in Araria district, Bihar, India

- CD Block
- Country: India
- State: Bihar
- Region: Mithila
- District: Araria
- Subdivision: Forbesganj
- Headquarters: Narpatganj (town)

Government
  - Type: Community development
  - Body: Araria Block

Languages
  - Official: Hindi, Urdu, English
  - Regional: Maithili
- Time zone: UTC+5:30 (IST)

Narpatganj is a community development block in the Araria district in Bihar, India. It is one out of 3 blocks of the Forbesganj subdivision. The headquarters of the block is in Narpatganj town.

The block is divided into many Village Councils and villages.

== Geography ==
Narpatganj is one of the 9 blocks in Araria district.

== Demographics ==
=== Population ===
The total population of the block is 270,128. There are 64 villages and 0 towns in this block. The literacy rate is 34.71%. The female literacy rate is 20.56%. The male literacy rate is 47.22%.

== Administration and politics ==
Narpatganj (Vidhan Sabha constituency) is the block's assembly constituency. Jai Prakash Yadav (BJP), elected in 2020, is the MLA. The Block Pramukh of this block is Manoj Yadav

== Gram Panchayats ==
Many gram panchayats are in the Narpatganj block in Forbesganj subdivision, Araria district.

=== Village List ===
1. Ajitnagar
2. Amrori
3. Anchraand Hanuman nagar
4. Baghua Dibiganj
5. Bardaha
6. Barhara
7. Barhepara
8. Bariarpur
9. Barmotra Arazi
10. Basmatiya
11. Bela
12. Belsandi
13. Belwa
14. Bhadwar
15. Bhairoganj
16. Bhanghi
17. Bhawanipur
18. Bhorhar
19. Chakorwa
20. Dahrahra
21. Damiya
22. Dargahiganj
23. Dombana
24. Dumari
25. Fatehpur
26. Gadhgawan
27. Garuha Bishunpur
28. Ghurna
29. Goarpuchhri
30. GokhulPur
31. Hanumannagar
32. Jitwarpur
33. Kamat Pathraha
34. Kandhaili
35. Khaira
36. Khapdeh
37. Kochgaon
38. Koskapur
39. Kuchgaon
40. Lachhmipur
41. Madhubani
42. Madhura
43. Maheshpatti
44. Manikpur
45. Mirdaul
46. Nathpur
47. Nawabganj
48. Parasi
49. Patehpur Arazi
50. Pathraha
51. Pathraha
52. Pharhi
53. Pithaura
54. Pokharia
55. Posdaha
56. Rajganj
57. Ramghat
58. Rewahi
59. Sahabganj
60. Sawaldeh
61. Shyamnagar
62. Sonapur
63. Tamganj
64. Tamganj Toufir
65. Tope Nawabganj

== See also ==
- Administration in Bihar
