= Forbesganj (community development block) =

Community development block in Araria district, Bihar, India

- CD Block
- Country: India
- State: Bihar
- Region: Mithila
- District: Araria
- Subdivision: Forbesganj
- Headquarters: Forbesganj (town)

Government
  - Type: Community development
  - Body: Forbesganj Block

Languages
  - Official: Maithili, Hindi, Urdu, English
- Time zone: UTC+5:30 (IST)

Forbesganj is a Community development block and a town in district of Araria, in Bihar state of India. It is one of the three blocks of Forbesganj subdivision. The headquarter of the block is at Forbesganj town.

== Etymology ==
During the British Raj the area was under the administration of a British district collector and municipal commissioner, Alexander John Forbes (1807-1890) of East India Company. Forbes had a bungalow at the same location. Consequently the area was known as 'residential area' also abbreviated as 'R-area'. Over time the name transformed to 'Araria' and the neighbouring subdivision came to be known as 'Forbesganj'.

== Gram Panchayats ==
The block is divided into many Village Councils and villages. There are multiple gram panchayats of Forbesganj block in Forbesganj subdivision, Araria district.

== See also ==
- Administration in Bihar
