= Kanpur railway station =

Railway station in Uttar Pradesh, India

Kanpur Junction railway station
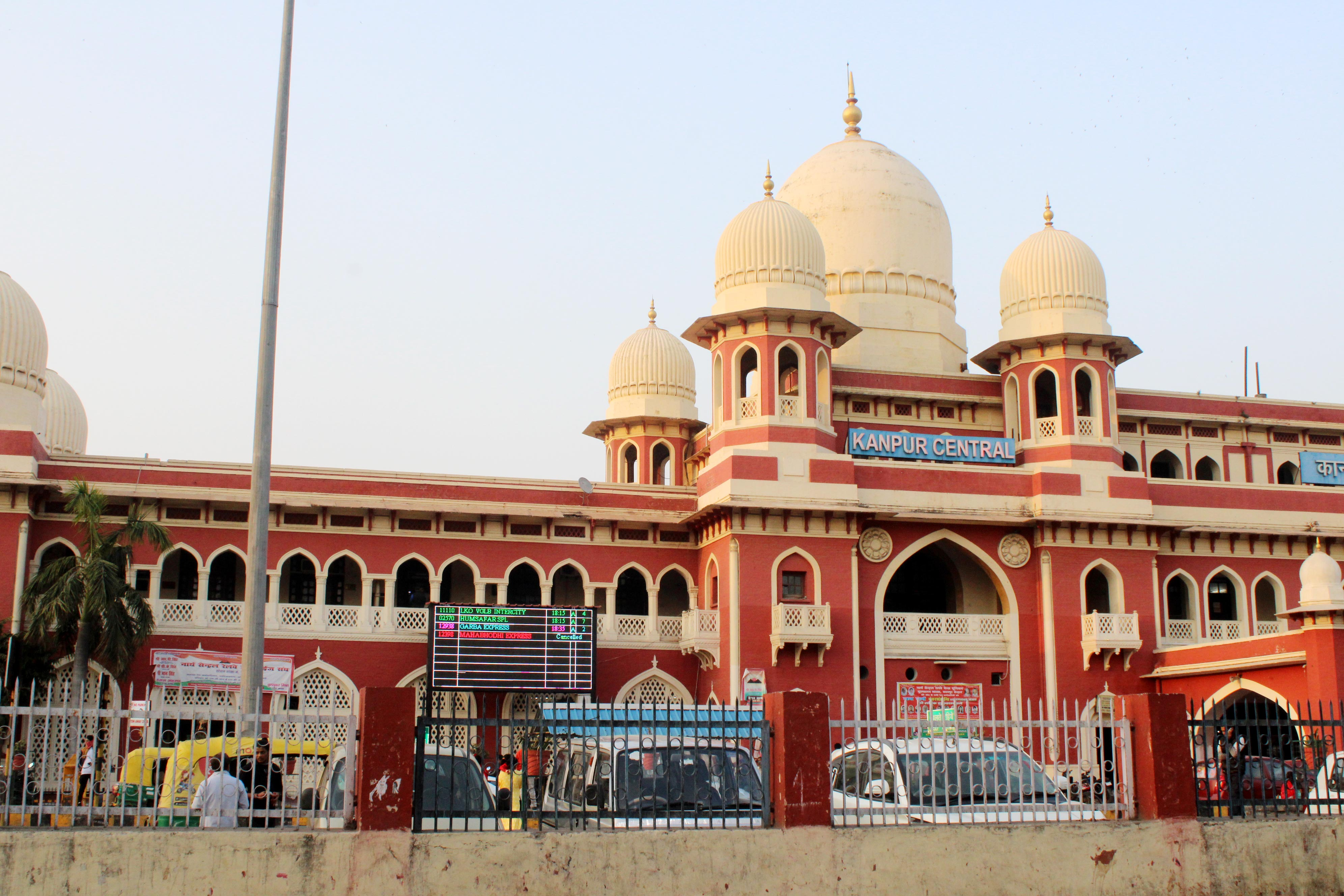

General information
- Location: India
- System: Indian Railways station
- Line: Kanpur–Prayagraj line

Construction
- Structure type: Standard (on-ground station)

Other information
- Status: Partially defunct
- Station code: CNB
- Zone(s): North Central Railway
- Division(s): Allahabad

History
- Opened: 1859
- Closed: 1930

Kanpur Junction (also known as Kanpur Purana) was a former station in Kanpur on the Kanpur–Prayagraj line opened in 1859 and closed after the opening of Kanpur Central, the present station.

== History ==
After the first passenger train service was inaugurated between Bombay and Thane, this was the fourth railway line in India opened from Allahabad to Kanpur (180 km) on 3 March 1859, which was the first passenger railway line in North India. This was followed in 1889 by the Delhi–Ambala–Kalka line.
