= Raniganj, Araria (community development block) =

Community development block in Araria district, Bihar, India

Raniganj
- Community development block
- Country: India
- State: Bihar
- Region: Mithila
- District: Araria
- Assembly constituency: Raniganj
- Time zone: UTC+5.30 (IST)
- Vehicle registration: BR-

Raniganj, Bihar is an administrative block (community development block) in Araria subdivision of Araria district in the Indian state of Bihar. It has a Vidhan Sabha Constituency with same name.

The block has 32 Panchayats and is one of the largest Community development blocks in Araria District.

== Politics ==
Raniganj is the state assembly constituency.

Achmit Rishidev from Janata Dal (United)(JD(U)) party is the MLA representing the Raniganj constituency in the Bihar legislative assembly. He was elected in 2020 Bihar Legislative Assembly election.

== Tourism ==
Raniganj Vriksh Vatika is a park spread over an area of 289 acre. It was developed by consolidating sparse forest area on Raniganj-Forbesganj road. The park has a large pond and animals such as hog deer, python, migratory birds. There are plans to build a zoo here.

== Transport ==
Raniganj is connected by road to district and commissionaire headquarters. It has a designated bus stand situated at Raniganj-Araria road. Nowadays many transport vehicles are passing through Raniganj market towards Jogbani and finally Nepal. Big transport vehicles are also made their ways through the market for saving toll charges. They cause huge traffic jam in the market. A no entry for transport vehicle during the day time has been brought in force since January 1, 2018.

It does not have any railway station. The nearest railway station is Araria RS. The station is a very small and doesn't have stoppage of super fast trains. Araria which is around 30 km from the Raniganj Block is connected to New Delhi by Seemanchal Experess. The train runs on daily basis. The Araria court station is also connected with Kolkata by Kolkata-Jogbani Express.

== Healthcare ==
Adequate medical facilities are not available. It has a referral hospital operated by government of Bihar. Only basic medical facilities are available in the hospital. Infrastructure development of the hospital is still under progress. Patients with more complex cases are usually referred to Araria or Purnia. Few practicing doctors are available who take care of common people.

== Education ==
The block lacks robust educational infrastructure. There is only one college which provides graduation level degree. Kalawati Degree College which provides graduation level degree is situated on Raniganj-Forbesganj Road. The college is affiliated with B N Mandal university, Madhepura. There are two more colleges which provide Intermediate level degree. There are few government high schools which are situated in the Market. Laljee High School, BLD High school, Kalawati Girls high school are famous of them. There are few other private schools mainly situated in the market area. These schools are trying hard to impart quality education.
