= Mohammed Shahnawaz Alam =

Indian politician

Shahnawaz Alam
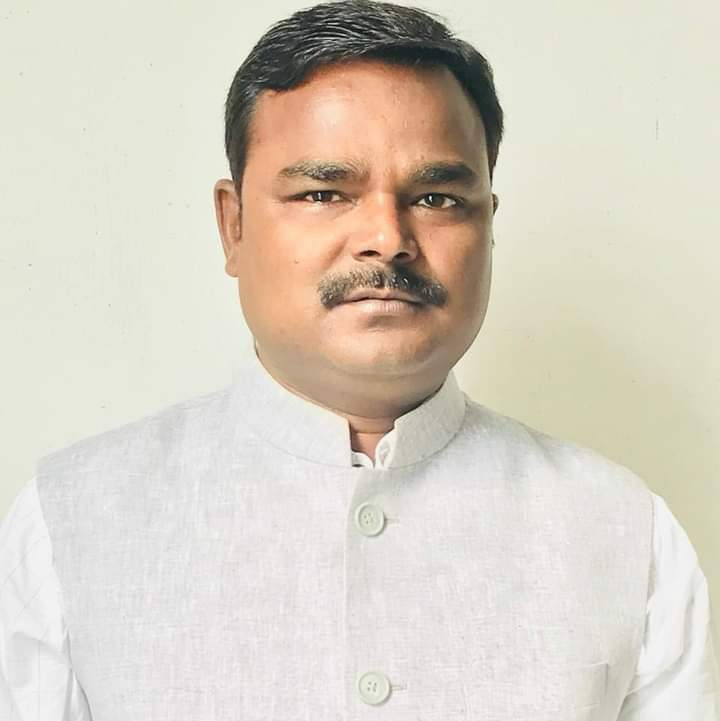

Minister of Disaster Management, Government of Bihar
- In office 16 August 2022 – February 2024
- Governor: Phagu Chouhan; Rajendra Arlekar
- Chief Minister: Nitish Kumar
- Deputy Chief Minister: Tejashwi Yadav
- Preceded by: Renu Devi

Member of the Legislative Assembly
- In office 31 May 2018 – 14 November 2025
- Preceded by: Sarfaraz Alam
- Succeeded by: Md. Murshid Alam
- Constituency: Jokihat

Personal details
- Born: 10 September 1982 (age 44) Jokihat, Bihar, India
- Party: Rashtriya Janata Dal
- Other political affiliations: All India Majlis-e-Ittehadul Muslimeen
- Relations: Sarfaraz Alam (Brother)|
- Parent: Mohammed Taslimuddin (father)
- Education: Delhi University, Bharti Vidyapeeth, Pune
- Profession: Politician
- Portfolio: Disaster Management

1 education. =((Law from Delhi University))

Shahnawaz Alam (born 10 September 1982) is an Indian politician. He was the Cabinet Minister in Bihar government with Disaster Management portfolio till February 2024. He was an MLA representing Jokihat assembly constituency of Bihar Legislative Assembly from May 2018 till November 2025.

== Party switch from AIMIM to RJD ==
He along with three other AIMIM MLAs viz., Anzar Nayeemi, Syed Ruknuddin Ahmed and Izhar Asfi joined RJD on 29 June 2022 in the presence of RJD chief Lalu Prasad Yadav leaving Amour MLA and Bihar AIMIM chief Akhtarul Iman as lone AIMIM MLA in the Legislative Assembly. After these four MLAs joined the RJD, party became the largest force in the Assembly with 80 members surpassing Bhartiya Janata Party (BJP).

== Family and personal life ==
He is the youngest son of former Indian politician and Minister of State Home in Union government Taslimuddin. Late Taslimuddin had represented Kishanganj, Araria and Purnia Lok Sabha of Seemanchal and Jokihat as an MLA. Shahnawaz is the brother of former Member of Parliament from Araria and Jokihat MLA Sarfaraz Alam.

== Political career ==
He comes from the flood-prone, Seemanchal area of Bihar, where flood destruction is an issue. The local population has hopes for him as a Disaster Management minister to work for the upliftment of the communities of the area.

He was a Member of Legislative Assembly from Bihar for a short period from May 2018 to November 2020 as a Rashtriya Janata Dal MLA from Jokihat but when Rashtriya Janata Dal denied him ticket in 2020 Bihar Assembly Election, he joined All India Majlis-E-Ittehadul Muslimeen (AIMIM) of Hyderabad MP Asaduddin Owaisi.

He contested the election against his brother and ex Jokihat MLA Sarfaraz Alam who was contesting on RJD ticket and won the election for second time with big margin as an AIMIM candidate. He rejoined the Rashtriya Janata Dal (RJD) party in 2022.

=== Work ===
Shahnawaz Alam is often involved in building local infrastructure to provide better connectivity for villagers. One upcoming project from him is the Mahananada basin plan. He himself belongs to same area where the Koshi river is.

He is the best mla of Bihar After winning in 2020, he has laid foundation stone of many roads and bridges in his constituency.[22][23][24][25][26]
