= Narpatganj Assembly constituency =

Coordinates: 26°20′N 87°07′E

Narpatganj
- Constituency No. 46 for the Bihar Legislative Assembly

Constituency details
- Country: India
- Region: East India
- State: Bihar
- District: Araria
- Established: 1962
- Total electors: 301,120
- Reservation: None

Member of Legislative Assembly
- 18th Bihar Legislative Assembly
- Incumbent Devanti Yadav
- Party: BJP
- Alliance: NDA
- Elected year: 2025

Narpatganj Assembly constituency is an assembly constituency in Araria district in the Indian state of Bihar. Jai Prakash Yadav (BJP), elected in 2020 is the MLA.

Each election in the Narpatganj Vidhansabha constituency has been won by a different political party (1962–2025).
1. INC (5 term) (31.2%)
2. BJP (6 term) (37.5%)
3. JP (1 term) (6.25%)
4. JD (2 term) (12.5%)
5. RJD (2 term) (12.5%)

== Overview ==
As per Delimitation of Parliamentary and Assembly constituencies Order, 2008, No 46 Narpatganj Assembly constituency is composed of the following: Narpatganj (community development block); Bhargama, Jainagar, Khajuri, Kushmaul, Manullahpatti, Paikpar, Raghunathpur North, Raghunathpur South, Rampur Aadi, Shankarpur, Simarbani, Sirsiya Hanumanganj and Sirsiya Kala of Bhargama (community development block).

== Narpatganj: BJP Maintains Its Lead in 2025 Assembly Election ==
In the 2024 Lok Sabha election, BJP candidate Pradeep Kumar Singh secured 1,22,421 votes in the Narpatganj Assembly segment, while RJD candidate Shahnawaz Alam received 83,647 votes. BJP led by 38,774 votes.

In the 2025 Bihar Assembly election, BJP candidate Devanti Yadav secured 1,20,557 votes, while RJD candidate Manish Yadav received 95,204 votes.

Devanti Yadav won by a margin of 25,353 votes.

The comparison shows that BJP retained Narpatganj, although its lead over RJD narrowed between the two elections.

Narpatganj Assembly constituency is part of No 9 Araria (Lok Sabha constituency) (SC).

== Members of the Legislative Assembly ==
Year	Name	Party
1962	Dumar Lal Baitha	Indian National Congress
1967	Satya Narayan Yadav	Indian National Congress
1969	Satya Narayan Yadav	Indian National Congress
1972	Satya Narayan Yadav	Indian National Congress
1977	Janardan Yadav	Janata Party
1980	Janardan Yadav	Bharatiya Janata Party
1985	Indranand Yadav	Indian National Congress
1990	Dayanand Yadav	Janata Dal
1995	Dayanand Yadav	Janata Dal
2000	Janardan Yadav	Bharatiya Janata Party
2005	Anil Kumar Yadav	Rashtriya Janata Dal
2005	Janardan Yadav	Bharatiya Janata Party
2010	Devanti Yadav	Bharatiya Janata Party
2015	Anil Kumar Yadav	Rashtriya Janata Dal
2020	Jai Prakash Yadav	Bharatiya Janata Party
2025	Devanti Yadav	Bharatiya Janata Party

== Election results ==
=== 2025 ===
2025 Bihar Legislative Assembly election: Narpatganj
Party	Candidate	Votes	%	±%
BJP	Devanti Yadav	120,557	49.89	+0.83
RJD	Manish Yadav	95,204	39.4	+4.61
Independent	Anil Kumar Yadav	10,669	4.42	
Independent	Shravan Kumar Das	3,761	1.56	
NOTA	None of the above	2,796	1.16	+0.72
Majority		25,353	10.49	−3.78
Turnout		241,647	71.79	+10.74
BJP hold		Swing		

=== 2020 ===
2020 Bihar Legislative Assembly election: Narpatganj
Party	Candidate	Votes	%	±%
BJP	Jai Prakash Yadav	98,397	49.06	+12.49
RJD	Anil Kumar Yadav	69,787	34.79	−16.53
AIMIM	Hadis	5,495	2.74	
Independent	Akhilesh Kumar	4,891	2.44	
JAP(L)	Prince Victor	3,993	1.99	−0.5
Janta Dal Rashtravadi	Harun	2,863	1.43	
Independent	Alok Kumar	2,774	1.38	
Independent	Prasenjeet Krishna	2,288	1.14	
BMP	Anant Kumar Ray	1,950	0.97	+0.48
NOTA	None of the above	874	0.44	−2.2
Majority		28,610	14.27	−0.48
Turnout		200,574	61.05	−1.36
BJP gain from RJD		Swing		

=== 2015 ===
2015 Bihar Legislative Assembly election: Narpatganj
Party	Candidate	Votes	%	±%
RJD	Anil Kumar Yadav	90,250	51.32	
BJP	Janardan Yadav	64,299	36.57	
JAP(L)	Prince Victor	4,377	2.49	
BSP	Guru Prasad Yadav	2,483	1.41	
CPI	Shyam Deo Roy	2,410	1.37	
NOTA	None of the above	4,637	2.64	
Majority		25,951	14.75	
Turnout		175,843	62.41	
