= Mohammed Taslimuddin =

Indian politician

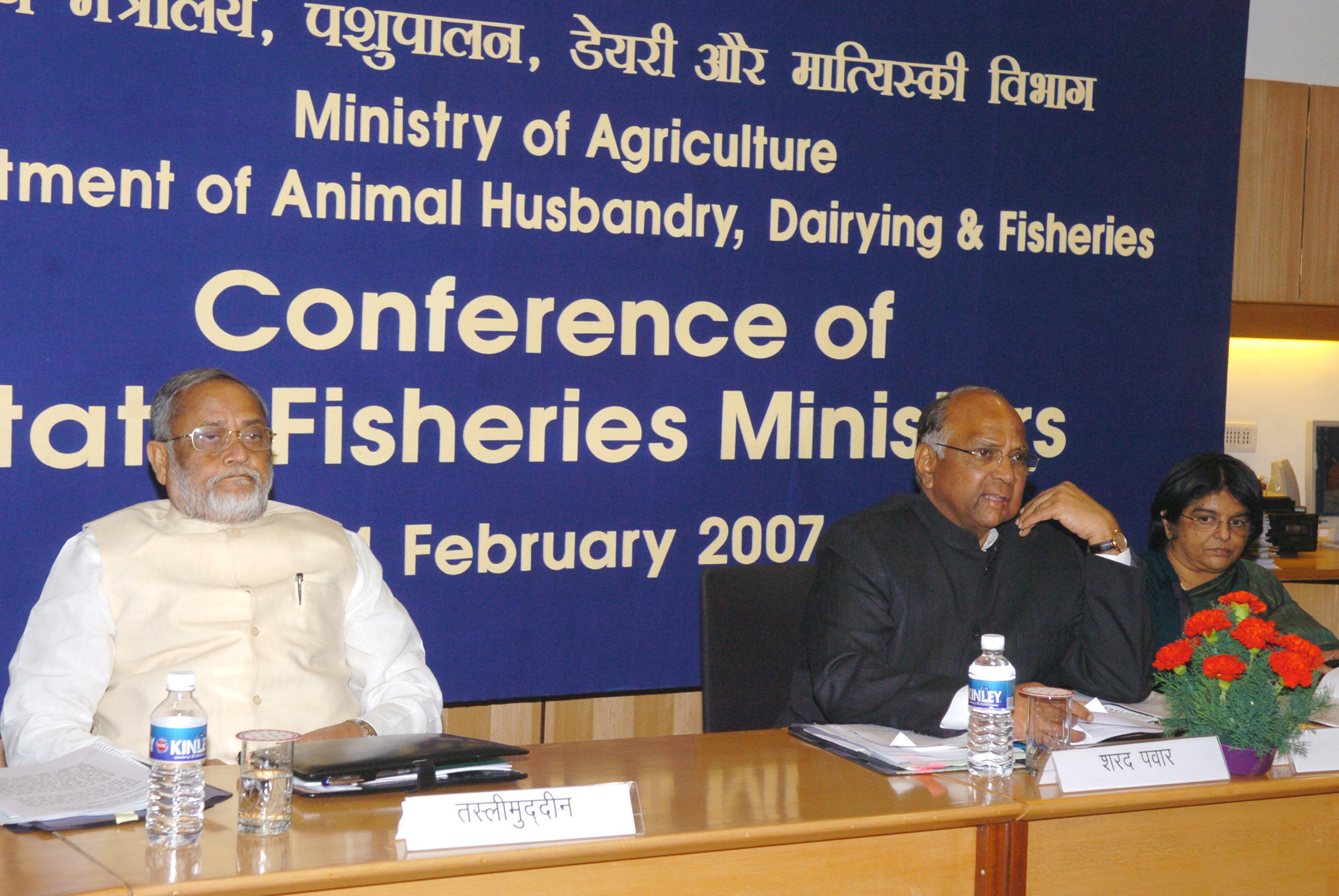
- Mohammed in 2007

Union Minister of State for Home Affairs
- In office 1 June 1996 – 9 June 1996
- Preceded by: Meijinlung Kamson
- Succeeded by: Maqbool Dar

Union Minister of State for Agriculture
- In office 25 May 2004 – 22 May 2009
- Preceded by: Akhilesh Prasad Singh
- Succeeded by: K. V. Thomas

Member of Parliament, Lok Sabha
- In office 16 May 2014 – 17 September 2017
- Preceded by: Pradeep Kumar Singh
- Succeeded by: Sarfaraz Alam
- Constituency: Araria
- In office 10 May 1996 – 26 April 1999
- Preceded by: Syed Shahabuddin
- Succeeded by: Shahnawaz Hussain
- Constituency: Kishanganj
- In office 16 May 2004 – 16 May 2009
- Preceded by: Shahnawaz Hussain
- Succeeded by: Asrarul Haq Qasmi
- Constituency: Kishanganj

Member of Bihar Legislative Assembly
- In office 9 February 1969 – 31 May 1980
- Preceded by: Nazamuddin
- Succeeded by: Moidur Rahman
- Constituency: Jokihat
- In office 5 March 1985 – 27 February 1990
- Preceded by: Moidur Rahman
- Succeeded by: Moidur Rahman
- Constituency: Jokihat
- In office 28 March 1995 – 10 May 1996
- Preceded by: Moidur Rahman
- Succeeded by: Sarfaraz Alam
- Constituency: Jokihat

Personal details
- Born: 4 January 1943 Sisauna, Bihar, British India
- Died: 17 September 2017 (aged 74) Chennai, Tamil Nadu, India
- Party: Rashtriya Janata Dal
- Other political affiliations: Indian National Congress (1969-1972); Independent (1972-1977); Janata Party (1977-1979); Janata Party (Secular) (1979-1980); Lok Dal (1980-1988); Janata Dal (1988-1992, 1995-1997); Samajwadi Party (1992-1995)
- Spouse: Akhtari Begum (m. 1949)
- Children: 7, including Sarfaraz Alam and Mohammed Shahnawaz Alam
- As of 17 September, 2017

Mohammed Taslimuddin (4 January 1943 – 17 September 2017) was an Indian politician and a veteran RJD leader, along with serving in various other parties as an MLA and MP. He hailed from the village of Sisauna in the Araria district of Bihar. He started his political career as a sarpanch and was elected to the Bihar Legislative Assembly for the first time in 1969, serving as an MLA eight times. In 1989, he was first elected to the Lok Sabha from the Purnia constituency. He was thrice elected as an MP from the Kishanganj constituency in 1996, 1998 and 2004. He served his final stint as an MP in the 16th Lok Sabha after being elected from the Araria constituency.

He died on 17 September 2017 at the age of 74 after being treated for respiratory problems in Chennai. He was buried with state honours on 19 September 2017 at his birthplace in Sisauna, Jokihat.

== Political history ==
Mohammed Taslimuddin was born in 1943, Sisauna village of district Araria, Bihar. In the year 1969, it was the first time he was elected to the Bihar Legislative Assembly as a Congress nominee. In the year 1989, he was elected as a Janata Dal candidate from district Purnea, Bihar also in the years of 1996, 1998, 2004 and 2014. In the year 1995, he won from the Jokihat seat as a Samajwadi Party candidate. In the year 1996, he fought Lok Sabha seat as a Janata Dal nominee from Kishanganj and he won. In the year 1996, in the government of HD Deve Gowda, he was a Union Minister of state for home affairs. He was Minister of Agriculture and Minister of State in the Ministry of Consumer Affairs, Food and Public Distribution during 2004 to 2009 in Manmohan Singh's government.

== Legal issues and allegations ==
Throughout his political career, Taslimuddin faced several criminal allegations. According to a 2004 report by The Tribune, he had 11 pending cases involving serious charges such as attempted murder, extortion, and violations of the Arms Act and the Cheating Act.

One of the earliest reported cases dates back to 1996, when an FIR alleged that Taslimuddin and about 15 supporters entered Rajokhar village in Araria district, opened fire, and hurled bombs. Authorities reportedly recovered used cartridges and explosives at the scene.

In November 2004, Taslimuddin surrendered before a court in Patna in connection with a cheque dishonour case, after a non-bailable warrant had been issued against him. He was granted bail on a personal bond.

The same year, the Bihar state government, led by the Rashtriya Janata Dal (RJD), formally withdrew a separate criminal case against him, citing lack of evidence and a withdrawal by the complainant.

In December 2008, a private construction company filed an FIR alleging that Taslimuddin demanded ₹2 crore in extortion from a ₹64 crore road construction project in Araria. He reportedly threatened the company's engineers. Taslimuddin denied the charges.

In August 2014, he surrendered before a Fast-Track Court in Kishanganj in connection with a 2009 election code violation case. He was later granted bail.

=== Alleged political support ===
Taslimuddin's appointment as Union Minister of State in the Manmohan Singh-led United Progressive Alliance government in 2004 attracted criticism due to the number of serious cases pending against him at the time. Despite this, he was inducted into the Council of Ministers.

Additionally, the RJD-led Bihar government withdrew at least one criminal case against him in 2004, following a meeting chaired at the Chief Minister’s residence.

Opposition parties, including the BJP, demanded his removal from the Union cabinet citing the issuance of non-bailable warrants and attachment orders in some cases.

Lok Sabha
Preceded by Pradeep Kumar Singh	Member of Parliament for Araria; 2014–2017	Succeeded by Sarfaraz Alam
