= Manoj Bishwas =

Indian politician

Member of Bihar Legislative Assembly
- Incumbent
- Assumed office 2025
- Preceded by: Vidya Sagar Keshri
- Constituency: Forbesganj

Personal details
- Party: Indian National Congress

Manoj Bishwas is an Indian politician from Indian National Congress and a member of Bihar Legislative Assembly from Forbesganj Assembly constituency seat.
