= Sarfaraz Alam =

Indian politician

Member of Parliament, Lok Sabha
- In office 14 March 2018 – 23 May 2019
- Preceded by: Mohammed Taslimuddin
- Succeeded by: Pradeep Kumar Singh
- Constituency: Araria

Member of the Bihar Legislative Assembly for Jokihat
- In office (1996-2000), (2000-2005), (2010-2015), (2015 – 2018)

Personal details
- Born: Village- Sisona, Thana- Jokihat, Post Office- Jokihat, Dist- Araria
- Party: Jan Suraaj Party (2025-present)
- Other political affiliations: Rashtriya Janata Dal (2010-2025)
- Parent: Mohammed Taslimuddin

Sarfraz Alam is an Indian politician who represented the Araria seat of Bihar in the Indian Parliament as a candidate of the Rashtriya Janata Dal from 2018 to 2019. He also served as a Minister in the Rabri Devi cabinet during his tenure as a member of the Bihar Legislative Assembly.

== Personal life ==
Alam is the son of Mohammed Taslimuddin, who was a member of Rashtriya Janata Dal and an MP from the Araria seat. He has 7 children with his wife Begum Shania.

== Career ==
Alam had been elected to the Bihar Legislative Assembly (from Jokihat seat) for four terms (1996, 2000, 2010, 2015) - first and second term as a candidate of Rashtriya Janata Dal, and the next two as a candidate of Janata Dal (United).

In January 2016, he was suspended by his party after a FIR was lodged against him for allegedly misbehaving with a couple in a train.

In February 2018, Alam rejoined Rashtriya Janata Dal. He said that Bihar Chief Minister Nitish Kumar had betrayed secular forces by breaking the Mahagathbandhan alliance and allying with Bharatiya Janata Party. Subsequently, he was nominated by the party to contest the Parliamentary bypoll for the seat of Araria (vacated due to the death of sitting MP Mohammed Taslimuddin).

On 16 october, a month before 2025 Bihar Legislative Assembly elections, Sarfaraz joined Prashant Kishor's Jan Suraaj Party

== Legal issues ==
January 2023, Sarfaraz Alam was sent to judicial custody in connection with a 26-year-old kidnapping case registered in 1996. The case, filed under case number 175/96 at the Araria police station, was based on a complaint by Shankar Kumar Jha alias Sakal Jha. He alleged that on the night of 15 May 1996, Alam, along with four to five unidentified individuals, forcibly abducted him from the residence of engineer Naveen Kumar Singh in Araria, where Jha was staying to assist Singh's family in his absence.

According to the complaint, Jha was taken on a motorcycle to an isolated area near the Chargharia river, where he overheard discussions among the accused about whether to kill or release him. He was later released near Town Hall. A warrant had been pending against Alam for several years, and the case remained unresolved.

On 3 January 2023, Alam appeared before the Special MP/MLA Court in Araria and was remanded to judicial custody. The court also demanded a status report from the SP regarding other pending cases against him. His bail was denied, and the next hearing was scheduled for 9 January 2023.
