= Jai Prakash Yadav (politician) =

Indian politician

Member of Bihar Legislative Assembly
- In office 2020–2025
- Preceded by: Anil Kumar Yadav
- Succeeded by: Devanti Yadav
- Constituency: Narpatganj

Personal details
- Born: 25 April 1955 (age 70)
- Party: Bharatiya Janata Party
- Occupation: Politician

Jai Prakash Yadav is an Indian politician from Bharatiya Janata Party, Bihar and a first term Member of Bihar Legislative Assembly from Narpatganj Assembly constituency.
