= Araria =

- City
- Location in Bihar, India Araria (India)
- Coordinates: 26.15°N 87.52°E
- Country: India
- State: Bihar
- Region: Kosi-Seemanchal
- District: Araria
- Established: January 1990

Government
  - Type: Municipal Council
  - Body: Araria Municipal Council
  - District Magistrate: Shri ANIL KUMAR (IAS)
- Elevation: 47 m (154 ft)

Population (2011)
  - Total: 79,021

Languages
  - Official: Hindi, Maithili
  - Additional official: Urdu
  - Regional Language: Maithili
- Time zone: UTC+5:30 (IST)
- PIN: 8543xx (Araria)
- Vehicle registration: BR-38
- Lok Sabha constituency: Araria
- Vidhan Sabha constituency: Araria
- Website: https://araria.nic.in

Araria is a city and a municipality that is the headquarters of Araria district in the Indian state of Bihar. Araria is situated in the northern part of Bihar.

== Etymology ==
During the British Raj the area was under the administration of a British district collector and municipal commissioner, Alexander John Forbes (1807-1890) of East India Company. Forbes had a bungalow at the same location. Consequently, the area was known as 'residential area' also abbreviated as 'R-area'. Over time the name transformed to 'Araria' and the neighbouring subdivision came to be known as 'Forbesganj'.

== History ==
Araria is a part of the Mithila region. Mithila first gained prominence after being settled by Indo-Aryan peoples who established the Mithila Kingdom (also called Kingdom of the Videhas).

During the late Vedic period (c. 1100–500 BCE), Kingdom of the Videhas became one of the major political and cultural centers of South Asia, along with Kuru and Pañcāla. The kings of the Kingdom of the Videhas were called Jankas. The Mithila Kingdom was later incorporated into the Vajjika League, which had its capital in the city of Vaishali, which is also in Mithila.

== Demographics ==
Araria is primarily a rural district; 93% of the total population lives in rural areas (713 villages). Only two out of nine tehsils have an urban population that is concentrated in Forbesganj and Araria(Census 2001).

In 2008 survey findings, Araria lagged behind the all India average in seven out of eight indicators and also lagged behind the all India level in terms of two more health-related indicators. Most of the villages lack some basic infrastructure: 92 percent are without any medical facilities; 20 percent of the villages lack formal facilities of education of any type; 597 out of 713 villages are without electricity; and 50 percent of the villages are without all-weather road connectivity. The overall work participation rate is 40.3 percent, which is much less in the case of the female population. Agriculture laborers dominate the labor force (64.7% of the total) which is almost double the national average.

Religions in Araria Town (2011)
Religion	Percent
Hinduism	59.05%
Islam	40.11%
Others	0.83%

There is a substantial concentration of minority (mainly Muslims) population. Against the state average of 20.52%, Muslims constitute 49.4 percent of the total rural populations, but their percentages are 77.5% in Jokihat, 62.70% in Araria, and 46.8% in Palasi subdivisions. The number of minority groups - Christian, Sikh, Buddhist and Jains - are less in comparison. The rural literacy rate is 33.2 percent, much below the state and national averages. The worst is the female literacy rate, i.e. 20.4%. In other words, only one out of five women are literate. Even sex ratio, i.e., 917 is less than state and all India level.

Kulhayya people majorly live in this region.

== Geography ==
Araria is located at 26.15°N 87.52°E. It has an average elevation of 47 metres (154 feet). Araria is situated at the northern part of Purnia and Madhepura in Bihar. Borders of Araria are surrounded by Nepal on the northern side, Kishanganj on the eastern side and Supaul on the south-west side. The district came into existence by the division of Purnia district on Makar Sankranti day of 1990. The district touches the Indo-Nepal international border also this area is close to three countries: Nepal, Bangladesh, and Bhutan. Hence, the district is important in terms of security. Jogbani is the last point of Araria and after that, Morang district of Nepal starts.

Kosi river used to pass through Araria, although it has changed its path long ago. The other important river of Araria is Panaar. Agriculture has flourished along the banks of this river, although it becomes catastrophic during the rainy season because of floods. A canal also passes through Araria. In clean weather Kangchenjunga range of mountains can be seen from here (especially after rain).

== Wildlife ==
Araria is the natural habitat of the Gangetic Dolphins. In the local rivers of Araria, Gangetic dolphins (South Asian river dolphins) are found.

== Culture ==
Durga Puja mela is one of the biggest festival celebrations at a different place in Araria. Many notable other festivals are celebrated like Chhat pooja, Diwali, Durga Puja, Janmashtami etc. Hindus and Muslim are living friendly environment and celebrating each festival.

Replica Stoop: situated Near Manikpur 5 km far from Araria district headquarter going towards Forbesganj.

The movie Teesri Kasam was shot in the villages of Araria. It was Basu Bhattacharya's film, based on Mare Gaye Gulfam written by Phanishwar Nath 'Renu', starring Raj Kapoor and Waheeda Rehman.

== Transport ==
=== Railway ===
Araria is accessible to other parts of India by railways via Katihar.

The nearest Railway Station is Araria court & Araria(R S). Araria Court Railway station lies on Katihar-Jogbani Branch Line. There are daily and weekly train available for Jogbani, Purnia, Katihar, Kolkata, Siliguri Junction, Begusarai, Patliputra Junction, Allahabad, Kanpur, Delhi.

=== Road ===
Connected with NH 27.

Buses for most of the districts and internal blocks are available from the bus terminal.

=== Airport ===
The nearest airport is Purnia Airport, now become a commercial airport from non-commercial airport.

== Politics ==
Araria Assembly constituency is the assembly constituency representing Araria (community development block). The same constituency also includes Araria Nagar Parishad. Avidur Rahman from Indian National Congress is the MLA elected in the 2020 Bihar Legislative Assembly election.

Araria (Vidhan Sabha constituency) is part of No 9 Araria (Lok Sabha constituency) (SC). Pardeep Kumar Singh from BJP (MP) elected in the 2024 Indian general election.

== Notable people ==
- Mohammed Taslimuddin - Former Union Minister of State
- Phanishwar Nath 'Renu' - Writer of modern Hindi literature
- Subrata Roy - Chairman of Sahara Group
- Quaiser Khalid, IPS - Police officer, Maharashtra Cadre, Poet, Educationist
- Bakhtiyar Ahmad- Founder of Araria Advertisers and social media activist
