= Forbesganj subdivision =

Administrative subdivision in Araria, Bihar

Forbesganj
- subdivision
- Country: India
- State: Bihar
- Region: Mithila
- District: Araria
- Assembly constituency: Raniganj
- Time zone: UTC+5.30 (IST)
- Vehicle registration: BR-

Forbesganj subdivision is an administrative subdivision out of two subdivisions of Araria district in the state of Bihar, India. It comprises 6 Blocks of Araria The headquarter of the subdivision is in Forbesganj town.

== Etymology ==
During the British Raj the area was under the administration of a British district collector and municipal commissioner, Alexander John Forbes (1807-1890) of East India Company. Forbes had a bungalow at the same location. Consequently the area was known as 'residential area' also abbreviated as 'R-area'. Over time, the name transformed to 'Araria' and the neighbouring subdivision came to be known as 'Forbesganj'.

== Health ==
Sub divisional Hospital Forbesganj is located near the Subdivision Office, Forbesganj

== Blocks of Forbesganj subdivision ==
1. Forbesganj
2. Narpatganj
3. Bhargama
