= Avidur Rahman =

Indian politician

Abidur Rahman

Member of the Bihar Legislative Assembly
- Incumbent
- Assumed office 1 December 2015
- Preceded by: Zakir Hussain Khan
- Constituency: Araria

Personal details
- Born: 2 January 1962 (age 64) Bihar, India
- Party: Indian National Congress

Abidur Rahman is an Indian politician belonging to Indian National Congress. He was elected as a member of Bihar Legislative Assembly from Araria in 2015.
