= Sasaram Lok Sabha constituency =

Constituency of the Indian parliament in Bihar

Coordinates: 25.0°N 84.0°E

Sasaram
- Lok Sabha constituency

Constituency details
- Country: India
- Region: East India
- State: Bihar
- Assembly constituencies: Mohania; Bhabhua; Chainpur; Chenari; Sasaram; Kargahar
- Established: 1957
- Reservation: SC

Member of Parliament
- 18th Lok Sabha
- Incumbent Manoj Kumar
- Party: Indian National Congress
- Elected year: 2024

Sasaram is one of the 40 Lok Sabha (parliamentary) constituencies in Bihar state in eastern India. It is reserved for Scheduled Castes.

== Assembly segments ==
As of May 2019, Sasaram Lok Sabha constituency comprises the following six legislative assembly segments:

| # | Name | District | Member | Party | 2024 lead |
|---|---|---|---|---|---|
| 204 | Mohania (SC) | Kaimur | Sangita Kumari | BJP | INC |
| 205 | Bhabhua | Kaimur | Bharat Bind | BJP | INC |
| 206 | Chainpur | Kaimur | Mohd Zama Khan | JD(U) | BJP |
| 207 | Chenari (SC) | Rohtas | Murari Prasad Gautam | LJP(RV) | INC |
| 208 | Sasaram | Rohtas | Snehlata Kushwaha | RLM | BJP |
| 209 | Kargahar | Rohtas | Bashisth Singh | JD(U) | BJP |

== Members of Parliament ==
=== 1952-1957 ===
As Shahabad South Lok Sabha constituency in 1st Lok Sabha.

| Year | Name | Party |
|---|---|---|
| 1952 | Ram Subhag Singh | Indian National Congress |
| 1952 | Jagjivan Ram | Indian National Congress |

=== 1957-Present ===
As Sasaram Lok Sabha constituency from 2nd Lok Sabha onwards. The following is the list of the Members of Parliament elected from this Lok Sabha constituency:

| Year | Name | Party |
|---|---|---|
| 1957 | Ram Subhag Singh | Indian National Congress |
| 1957 | Jagjivan Ram | Indian National Congress |
| 1962 | Jagjivan Ram | Indian National Congress |
| 1967 | Jagjivan Ram | Indian National Congress |
| 1971 | Jagjivan Ram | Indian National Congress |
| 1977 | Jagjivan Ram | Janata Party |
| 1980 | Jagjivan Ram | Janata Party |
| 1984 | Jagjivan Ram | Indian National Congress (J) |
| 1989 | Chhedi Paswan | Janata Dal |
| 1991 | Chhedi Paswan | Janata Dal |
| 1996 | Muni Lall | Bharatiya Janata Party |
| 1998 | Muni Lall | Bharatiya Janata Party |
| 1999 | Muni Lall | Bharatiya Janata Party |
| 2004 | Meira Kumar | Indian National Congress |
| 2009 | Meira Kumar | Indian National Congress |
| 2014 | Chhedi Paswan | Bharatiya Janata Party |
| 2019 | Chhedi Paswan | Bharatiya Janata Party |
| 2024 | Manoj Kumar | Indian National Congress |

== Election results ==
=== 2024 Indian general elections ===
2024 Indian general elections: Sasaram
| Party | Candidate | Votes | % | ±% |
|---|---|---|---|---|
| INC | Manoj Kumar | 513,004 | 46.72 | ▲12.96 |
| BJP | Shivesh Kumar | 4,93,847 | 44.98 | ▼5.78 |
| NOTA | None of the above | 17,219 | 1.57 | ▼0.38 |
| Majority | | 19,157 | 1.74 | ▼15.26 |
| Turnout | | 10,97,925 | 57.34 | ▲2.77 |
| INC gain from BJP | | Swing | ▲12.96 | |

=== 2019 ===
2019 Indian general elections: Sasaram
| Party | Candidate | Votes | % | ±% |
|---|---|---|---|---|
| BJP | Chhedi Paswan | 494,800 | 50.76 | +7.57 |
| INC | Meira Kumar | 3,29,055 | 33.76 | −1.96 |
| BSP | Manoj Kumar | 86,406 | 8.86 | |
| NOTA | None of the Above | 18,988 | 1.95 | |
| Majority | | 1,65,745 | 17.00 | +9.53 |
| Turnout | | 9,75,577 | 54.57 | |
| BJP hold | | Swing | | |

=== 2014 Election ===
2014 Indian general elections: Sasaram
| Party | Candidate | Votes | % | ±% |
|---|---|---|---|---|
| BJP | Chhedi Paswan | 3,66,087 | 43.19 | |
| INC | Meira Kumar | 3,02,760 | 35.72 | |
| JD(U) | Karra Parasu Ramaiah | 93,310 | 11.01 | |
| BSP | Baleshwar Bharti | 31,528 | 3.72 | |
| AAP | Geeta Arya | 11,005 | 1.30 | |
| NOTA | None of the Above | 13,379 | 1.58 | |
| Majority | | 63,327 | 7.47 | |
| Turnout | | 8,47,608 | 52.72 | |
| BJP gain from INC | | Swing | | |

=== General elections 2009 ===
2009 Indian general election: Sasaram
| Party | Candidate | Votes | % | ±% |
|---|---|---|---|---|
| INC | Meira Kumar | 192,213 | 32.09 | |
| BJP | Muni Lal | 1,49,259 | 24.92 | |
| RJD | Lalan Paswan | 1,09,498 | 18.28 | |
| BSP | Gandhi Azad | 96,613 | 16.13 | |
| Independent | 4 Independent candidates | 19,410 | 3.23 | |
| Other parties | 7 Other party candidates | 32,038 | 5.34 | |
| Majority | | 42,954 | 7.17 | |

=== 2004 Indian general election ===
2004 Indian general election: Sasaram
| Party | Candidate | Votes | % | ±% |
|---|---|---|---|---|
| INC | Meira Kumar | 416,673 | 59.76 | |
| BJP | Muni Lall | 1,58,411 | 22.72 | |
| BSP | Madan Ram | 96,580 | 13.85 | |
| CPI(ML)L | Dukhi Ram | 9,936 | 1.42 | |
| SJP(R) | Ashok Kumar | 3,587 | 0.51 | |
| Independent | Sudarshan Ram | 3,403 | 0.49 | |
| AD | Shiv Kumar Mushehar | 2,142 | 0.31 | |
| Independent | Vashishth Paswan | 2,131 | 0.31 | |
| SP | Ram Bachan Ram | 1,896 | 0.27 | |
| Independent | Tengar Paswan | 1,386 | 0.20 | |
| Independent | Phekhu Ram | 1,123 | 0.16 | |
| Majority | | 2,58,262 | 37.04 | |
| Turnout | | | | |
| Swing to INC from BJP | | Swing | | |

=== 1999 Indian general election ===
1999 Indian general election: Sasaram (SC)
| Party | Candidate | Votes | % | ±% |
|---|---|---|---|---|
| BJP | Muni Lall | 257,223 | 39.37 | |
| RJD | Ram Keshi Bharati | 2,38,547 | 36.51 | |
| BSP | Chandrika Das | 82,861 | 12.68 | |
| NCP | Chhedi Paswan | 46,449 | 7.11 | |
| CPI(ML)L | Ravishanker Ram | 14,320 | 2.19 | |
| Ajeya Bharat Party | Amitesh Kumar Choudhary | 7,612 | 1.17 | |
| Independent | Ayodhaya Ram | 4,251 | 0.65 | |
| Shoshit Samaj Dal | Tengar Paswan | 2,052 | 0.31 | |
| Majority | | 18,676 | 2.86 | |
| Turnout | | 6,62,269 | 57.87 | |
| Swing to BJP from RJD | | Swing | | |

=== 1998 Indian general election ===
1998 Indian general election: Sasaram (SC)
| Party | Candidate | Votes | % | ±% |
|---|---|---|---|---|
| BJP | Muni Lall | 282,865 | 42.10 | |
| RJD | Ram Keshi Prasad | 1,94,137 | 28.89 | |
| BSP | Chhedi Paswan | 1,41,322 | 21.03 | |
| JD | Rama Shanker Paswan | 23,701 | 3.53 | |
| CPI(ML)L | Ravi Shankar Ram | 21,307 | 3.17 | |
| Independent | Satyendra Ram | 6,509 | 0.97 | |
| Independent | Banshidhar Paswan | 2,119 | 0.32 | |
| Majority | | 88,728 | 13.21 | |
| Turnout | | 6,82,985 | 59.69 | |
| Swing to BJP from RJD | | Swing | | |

=== 1996 Indian general election ===
1996 Indian general election: Sasaram (SC)
| Party | Candidate | Votes | % | ±% |
|---|---|---|---|---|
| BJP | Muni Lal | 282,075 | 48.17 | |
| JD | Chhedi Paswan | 2,28,442 | 39.01 | |
| BSP | Vishram Ram | 32,415 | 5.54 | |
| INC | Ishwar Dayal Ram | 11,925 | 2.04 | |
| CPI(ML)L | Ravi Shanker Ram | 8,670 | 1.48 | |
| Others | 2 Other Party Candidates | 2,100 | 0.36 | |
| Independent | 12 Independent Candidates | 19,920 | 3.42 | |
| Majority | | 53,633 | 9.16 | |
| Turnout | | | | |
| Swing to BJP from JD | | Swing | | |

=== 1991 Indian general election ===
1991 Indian general election: Sasaram (SC)
| Party | Candidate | Votes | % | ±% |
|---|---|---|---|---|
| JD | Chhedi Paswan | 210,823 | 44.49 | |
| INC | Meira Kumar | 1,88,261 | 39.73 | |
| BJP | Surendra Ram | 40,549 | 8.56 | |
| IPF | Prabhoo Lal Paswan | 10,505 | 2.22 | |
| BSP | Sheodhar Ram | 9,113 | 1.92 | |
| JP | Mahabir Paswan | 7,453 | 1.57 | |
| Others | 2 Other Party Candidates | 1,298 | 0.28 | |
| Independent | 11 Independent Candidates | 5,904 | 1.25 | |
| Majority | | 22,562 | 4.76 | |
| Turnout | | | | |
| Swing to JD from INC | | Swing | | |

=== 1989 Indian general election ===
1989 Indian general election: Sasaram (SC)
| Party | Candidate | Votes | % | ±% |
|---|---|---|---|---|
| JD | Chhedi Paswan | 306,615 | 57.70 | |
| INC | Meira Kumar | 1,92,959 | 36.31 | |
| IPF | Parsu Ram Lal | 14,082 | 2.65 | |
| BSP | Kalwshwar Ram | 12,973 | 2.44 | |
| LKD | Ram Vachen Ram | 2,194 | 0.41 | |
| Independent | Arun Kumar Ram | 1,739 | 0.33 | |
| Independent | Ghasita Ram Coudhary | 870 | 0.16 | |
| Majority | | 1,13,656 | 21.39 | |
| Turnout | | 5,38,050 | 55.71 | |
| Swing to JD from INC | | Swing | | |

=== 1984 Indian general election ===
1984 Indian general election: Sasaram (SC)
| Party | Candidate | Votes | % | ±% |
|---|---|---|---|---|
| INC(J) | Jagjivan Ram | 207,275 | 48.25 | |
| INC | Mahabir Paswan | 2,05,903 | 47.93 | |
| Independent | Farsani Ram | 5,529 | 1.29 | |
| Independent | Rajni Kant Ram | 4,730 | 1.10 | |
| Independent | Ghasita Ram Chaudhary | 2,146 | 0.50 | |
| Independent | Mahgoo Ram | 1,965 | 0.46 | |
| Independent | Jagdish Narayan Rai | 1,434 | 0.33 | |
| Independent | Akloo Ram | 584 | 0.14 | |
| Majority | | 1,372 | 0.32 | |
| Turnout | | 4,35,671 | 52.73 | |
| Swing to INC(J) from INC | | Swing | | |

=== 1980 Indian general election ===
1980 Indian general election: Sasaram (SC)
| Party | Candidate | Votes | % | ±% |
|---|---|---|---|---|
| JP | Jagjivan Ram | 169,207 | 43.98 | |
| INC(I) | Mahabir Paswan | 1,18,037 | 30.68 | |
| JP(S) | Shiva Nandan Paswan | 80,516 | 20.93 | |
| Independent | Daya Shankar Ram | 6,928 | 1.80 | |
| Independent | Ram Prasad Das | 4,640 | 1.21 | |
| Independent | Lakshman Ram | 2,401 | 0.62 | |
| Shoshit Samaj Dal | R. V. Paswan | 1,530 | 0.40 | |
| Independent | Atirajo Devi | 1,511 | 0.39 | |
| Majority | | 51,170 | 13.30 | |
| Turnout | | 3,91,165 | 52.08 | |
| Swing to JP from INC(I) | | Swing | | |

=== 1977 Indian general election ===
1977 Indian general election: Sasaram (SC)
| Party | Candidate | Votes | % | ±% |
|---|---|---|---|---|
| JP | Jagjivan Ram | 327,995 | 78.49 | |
| INC | Mungeri Lall | 84,185 | 20.15 | |
| Independent | Ram Prasad Das | 5,696 | 1.36 | |
| Majority | | 2,43,810 | 58.34 | |
| Turnout | | 4,25,637 | 64.98 | |
| Swing to JP from INC | | Swing | | |

=== 1971 Indian general election ===
1971 Indian general election: Sasaram (SC)
| Party | Candidate | Votes | % | ±% |
|---|---|---|---|---|
| INC | Jagjivan Ram | 210,353 | 66.93 | |
| INC(O) | Mahabir Pasawan | 88,153 | 28.05 | |
| Independent | Ram Prasad Das | 6,421 | 2.04 | |
| Independent | Dular Chand Ram | 3,034 | 0.97 | |
| Independent | Kapil Ram | 2,627 | 0.84 | |
| Independent | Ram Keshi Prasad | 2,455 | 0.78 | |
| Jharkhand Party | Lakshmi Ram | 788 | 0.25 | |
| Independent | Shyam Kumari | 460 | 0.15 | |
| Majority | | 1,22,200 | 38.88 | |
| Turnout | | 3,22,156 | 52.62 | |
| Swing to INC from INC(O) | | Swing | | |

=== 1967 Indian general election ===
1967 Indian general election: Sasaram (SC)
| Party | Candidate | Votes | % | ±% |
|---|---|---|---|---|
| INC | Jagjivan Ram | 149,355 | 53.90 | |
| PSP | S. Ram | 38,689 | 13.96 | |
| ABJS | S. Choudhary | 31,692 | 11.44 | |
| SSP | R. V. Prasad | 21,728 | 7.84 | |
| Independent | S. Chamar | 13,220 | 4.77 | |
| Independent | R. Chamar | 10,592 | 3.82 | |
| Independent | R. P. Das | 6,030 | 2.18 | |
| Independent | R. P. Lal | 5,801 | 2.09 | |
| Majority | | 1,10,666 | 39.94 | |
| Turnout | | 2,91,181 | 54.33 | |
| Swing to INC from PSP | | Swing | | |

=== 1962 Indian general election ===
1962 Indian general election: Sasaram (SC)
| Party | Candidate | Votes | % | ±% |
|---|---|---|---|---|
| INC | Jagjivan Ram | 137,060 | 54.27 | |
| SWA | Rameshwar Agnibhoj | 83,065 | 32.89 | |
| PSP | Ram Prakash Lal | 15,074 | 5.97 | |
| ABJS | Sahdeo Ram | 11,738 | 4.65 | |
| Socialist | Ram Veyas Prasad | 5,594 | 2.22 | |
| Majority | | 53,995 | 21.38 | |
| Turnout | | 2,61,839 | 62.83 | |
| Swing to INC from SWA | | Swing | | |

== See also ==
- Rohtas district, in Bihar
- List of constituencies of the Lok Sabha

Lok Sabha
| Preceded by Satara | Constituency represented by the leader of the opposition 1979 | Vacant till 1989; No Official opposition Title next held by Amethi |
