= Chenari Assembly constituency =

Constituency of the Bihar legislative assembly in India

- Constituency No. 207 for the Bihar Legislative Assembly

Constituency details
- Country: India
- Region: East India
- State: Bihar
- District: Rohtas
- Established: 1962
- Total electors: 312,311

Member of Legislative Assembly
- 18th Bihar Legislative Assembly
- Incumbent Murari Prasad Gautam
- Party: LJP(RV)
- Alliance: NDA
- Elected year: 2025

Chenari Assembly constituency is one of 243 constituencies of legislative assembly of Bihar. It comes under Sasaram Lok Sabha constituency.

== Overview ==
Chenari comprises community blocks of Nauhatta, Rohtas & Chenari; Gram Panchayats Alampur, Raipurchor, Karup, Konki, Kumahu, Mohammadpur, Nad, Sikraur, Sheosagar, Sonahar & Uloh of Sheosagar CD Block.

== Members of the Legislative Assembly ==
| Year | Name | Party |
|---|---|---|
| 1962 | Shri Gobind Ram | Indian National Congress |
| 1967 | Ramkrishna Ram | Indian National Congress |
| 1969 | Ramkrishna Ram | Indian National Congress |
| 1972 | Ram Bachan Paswan | Hindustani Shoshit Dal |
| 1977 | Ram Bachan Paswan | Janata Party |
| 1980 | Dudnath Paswan | Indian National Congress (I) |
| 1985 | Chhedi Paswan | Lok Dal |
| 1990 | Jawahar Paswan | Janata Dal |
| 1995 | Jawahar Paswan | Janata Dal |
| 2000 | Chhedi Paswan | Rashtriya Janata Dal |
| 2005 | Lalan Paswan | Janata Dal (United) |
| 2005 | Lalan Paswan | Janata Dal (United) |
| 2009^ | Murari Prasad Gautam | Indian National Congress |
| 2010 | Shyam Bihari Ram | Janata Dal (United) |
| 2015 | Lalan Paswan | Rashtriya Lok Samta Party |
| 2020 | Murari Prasad Gautam | Indian National Congress |
| 2025 | Murari Prasad Gautam | Lok Janshakti Party (Ram Vilas) |

^by-election

== Election results ==
=== 2025 ===
2025 Bihar Legislative Assembly election: Chenari
| Party | Candidate | Votes | % | ±% |
|---|---|---|---|---|
| LJP(RV) | Murari Prasad Gautam | 95,579 | 46.44 | |
| INC | Mangal Ram | 73,591 | 35.76 | −5.49 |
| JSP | Neha Kumari | 9,404 | 4.57 | |
| ASP(KR) | Amit Paswan | 7,536 | 3.66 | |
| Independent | Sukhari Ram | 4,266 | 2.07 | |
| BSP | Sweta Devi | 3,511 | 1.71 | −5.69 |
| Independent | Hare Ram Ram | 2,006 | 0.97 | |
| NOTA | None of the above | 2,328 | 1.13 | −0.85 |
| Majority | | 21,988 | 10.68 | +0.32 |
| Turnout | | 205,793 | 65.89 | +8.64 |
| LJP(RV) gain from INC | | Swing | | |

=== 2020 ===
Bihar Assembly election, 2020: Chenari
| Party | Candidate | Votes | % | ±% |
|---|---|---|---|---|
| INC | Murari Prasad Gautam | 71,701 | 41.25 | +2.61 |
| JD(U) | Lalan Paswan | 53,698 | 30.89 | |
| LJP | Chandra Shekhar Paswan | 18,074 | 10.4 | |
| BSP | Shyam Bihari Ram | 12,864 | 7.4 | +3.79 |
| Independent | Manish Kumar Rajak | 3,068 | 1.77 | |
| Independent | Ram Adhar Paswan | 2,549 | 1.47 | |
| NOTA | None of the above | 3,450 | 1.98 | −3.9 |
| Majority | | 18,003 | 10.36 | +3.89 |
| Turnout | | 173,823 | 57.25 | +2.82 |
| INC gain from | | Swing | | |

=== 2015 ===
2015 Bihar Legislative Assembly election: Chenari
| Party | Candidate | Votes | % | ±% |
|---|---|---|---|---|
| RLSP | Lalan Paswan | 68,148 | 45.11 | |
| INC | Mangal Ram | 58,367 | 38.64 | |
| BSP | Ramendra Ram | 5,455 | 3.61 | |
| Independent | Aman Kumar | 2,589 | 1.71 | |
| SP | Ravi Paswan | 1,752 | 1.16 | |
| Independent | Mahendra Baitha | 1,369 | 0.91 | |
| NOTA | None of the above | 8,876 | 5.88 | |
| Majority | | 9,781 | 6.47 | |
| Turnout | | 151,067 | 54.43 | |

== See also ==
- List of constituencies of Bihar Legislative Assembly
