= Saunja, India =

Coordinates: 24°55′N 83°56′E

Saunja Prabhu Dham Saunja
- Village
- Motto: Satyamev Jayate
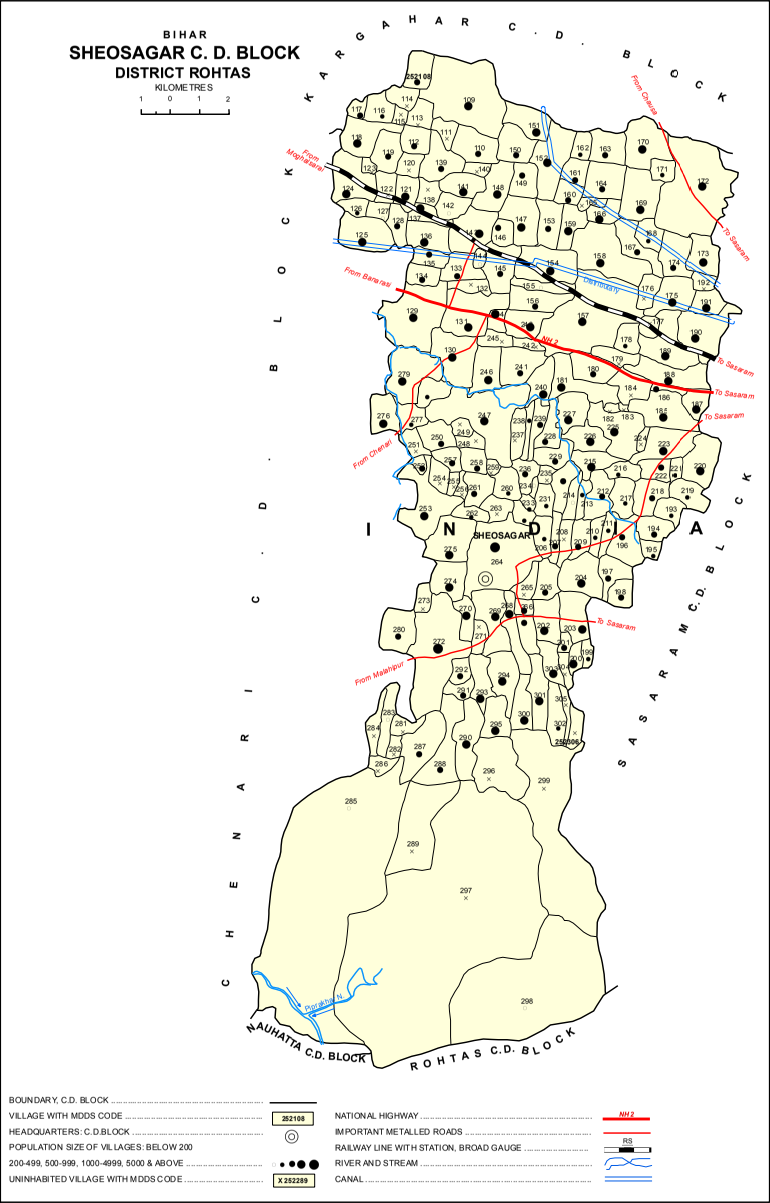
- Map showing Saunja (#171) in Sheosagar block.
- Country: India

Government
  - Margdarshak: Vishwanath Pandey

Area
  - Total: 20 km^{2} (7.7 sq mi)

Population (2011)
  - Total: 592
  - Density: 592/km^{2} (1,530/sq mi)
- Time zone: UTC+05:30 (IST)
- Area code: 821111
- Website: www.saunja.in

Saunja (or Sounja) is a small village in Sheosagar block of Rohtas district, in southern Bihar, India.

== Demographics ==
Saunja is a medium size village located in Sheosagar of Rohtas district, Bihar, with total 93 families residing. The Saunja village has population of 592 of which 285 are males while 307 are females as per Population Census 2011.

In Saunja village, the population of children aged 0-6 is 89, which makes up 15.03% of the total population of the village. The average sex ratio of Saunja village is 1,077, which is higher than the Bihar state average of 918. The child sex ratio for the Saunja as per census is 679, lower than the Bihar average of 935.

Saunja village a has higher literacy rate compared to the rest of Bihar. In 2011, the literacy rate of Saunja village was 69.58% compared to 61.80% of Bihar. In Saunja, male literacy stands at 78.02% while the female literacy rate was 62.36%.

As per the constitution of India and Panchyati Raaj Act, Saunja village is administrated by a sarpanch (the head of the village) who is elected representative of village.
