= Meira Kumar =

15th Speaker of the Lok Sabha from 2009 to 2014

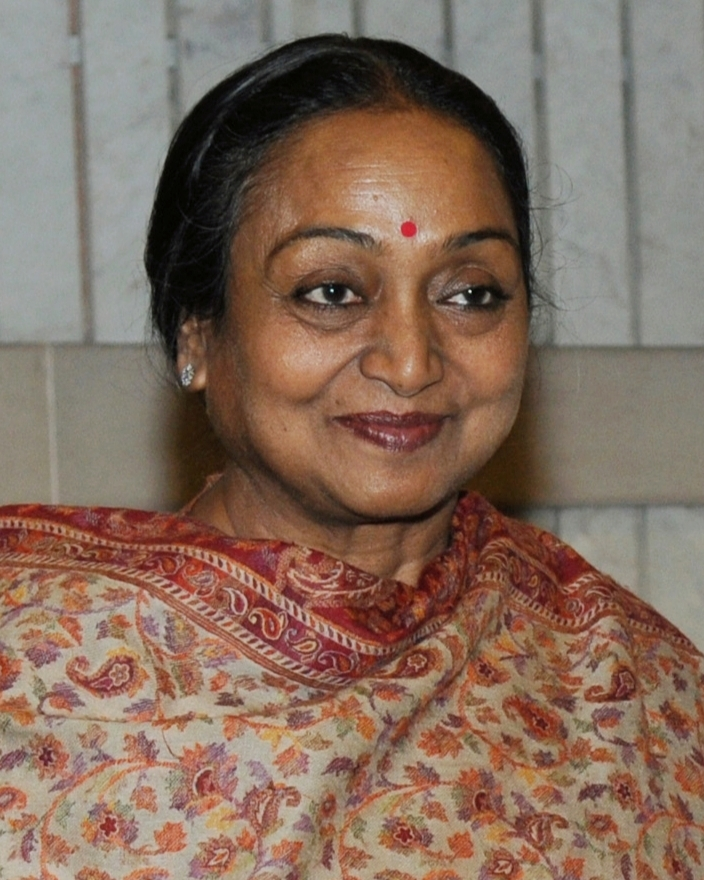
- Kumar in 2013

15th Speaker of the Lok Sabha
- In office 4 June 2009 – 4 June 2014
- President: Pratibha Patil; Pranab Mukherjee
- Deputy: Kariya Munda
- Leader of the House: Pranab Mukherjee; Sushilkumar Shinde
- Preceded by: Somnath Chatterjee
- Succeeded by: Sumitra Mahajan

Union Minister of Water Resources
- In office 22 May 2009 – 25 May 2009
- Prime Minister: Manmohan Singh
- Cabinet: Manmohan II
- Preceded by: Saifuddin Soz
- Succeeded by: Pawan Kumar Bansal

Union Minister of Social Justice and Empowerment
- In office 22 May 2004 – 22 May 2009
- Prime Minister: Manmohan Singh
- Cabinet: Manmohan I
- Preceded by: Satyanarayan Jatiya
- Succeeded by: Selja Kumari

Member of Parliament, Lok Sabha
- In office 2004–2014
- Preceded by: Muni Lall
- Succeeded by: Chhedi Paswan
- Constituency: Sasaram, Bihar
- In office 1996–1999
- Preceded by: Kalka Dass
- Succeeded by: Anita Arya
- Constituency: Karol Bagh, Delhi
- In office 1985–1989
- Preceded by: Chowdhary Girdhari Lal
- Succeeded by: Mayawati
- Constituency: Bijnor, Uttar Pradesh

Personal details
- Born: 31 March 1945 (age 81) Arrah, Bihar, British India (present day Bihar, India)
- Party: Indian National Congress
- Other political affiliations: United Progressive Alliance
- Spouse: Manjul Kumar (m. 1968)
- Relations: Sumitra Devi (mother-in-law)
- Children: 3 (1 son and 2 daughters)
- Parent: Jagjivan Ram (father)
- Education: Faculty of Law, University of Delhi

Meira Kumar (born 31 March 1945) is an Indian politician and former diplomat. A member of the Indian National Congress, she was the Minister of Social Justice and Empowerment from 2004 to 2009, the Minister of Water Resources for a brief period in 2009. She served as the 15th Speaker of Lok Sabha from 2009 to 2014, being the first woman to hold the post. Kumar became just the second woman to be nominated for President of India by a major political block when she secured the United Progressive Alliance's nomination in 2017.

Prior to being a member of the 15th Lok Sabha, Kumar had been elected earlier to the 8th, 11th, 12th and 14th Lok Sabha. Kumar was the joint presidential candidate by the leading opposition parties for 2017 presidential election and lost the election to the NDA nominee Ram Nath Kovind. Meira Kumar's vote share is the third highest for a losing candidate, behind that of Neelam Sanjiva Reddy in the 1969 Presidential elections and K. Subba Rao in 1967 Presidential elections.

== Early life ==
Meira Kumar was born on 31 March 1945, in Bhojpur district, Bihar of the British India (present day Bihar, India) to Jagjivan Ram, a Dalit Chamar leader and former Deputy Prime Minister and Indrani Devi, a prominent leader of the Indian freedom struggle. Growing up, Kumar shared a close relationship with her mother, with whom she spent most of her time. She has described her as the biggest influence from her childhood.

Kumar attended the Welham Girls' School, Dehradun and Maharani Gayatri Devi Girls' Public School in Jaipur. She studied at Banasthali Vidyapith for a short duration. She completed her Master's degree and Bachelors of Law from Indraprastha College and the Faculty of Law, University of Delhi respectively. She also received an honorary doctorate from Banasthali Vidyapith in 2010.

Kumar worked as a social worker during her youth, actively participating in movements supporting social reforms, human rights, and democratic ideas. She was appointed as the Chairperson of National Drought Relief Committee constituted by the Congress during 1967 famine in region of Bihar. As the head of the commission, Kumar launched a Family Adoption Scheme under which drought-affected families were provided support from volunteering households.

== Career ==
=== Foreign Service ===
Kumar joined the Indian Foreign Service in 1973 and was posted as language trainee at the Embassy of India Spain. During this period, she obtained a diploma in Spanish. Later, she was posted at the High Commission of India, United Kingdom . After working as a diplomat for a decade, Kumar quit the Indian Foreign Services in 1985 and decided to enter politics after being encouraged by her father Jagjivan Ram and later Prime Minister Rajiv Gandhi .

=== Political career ===
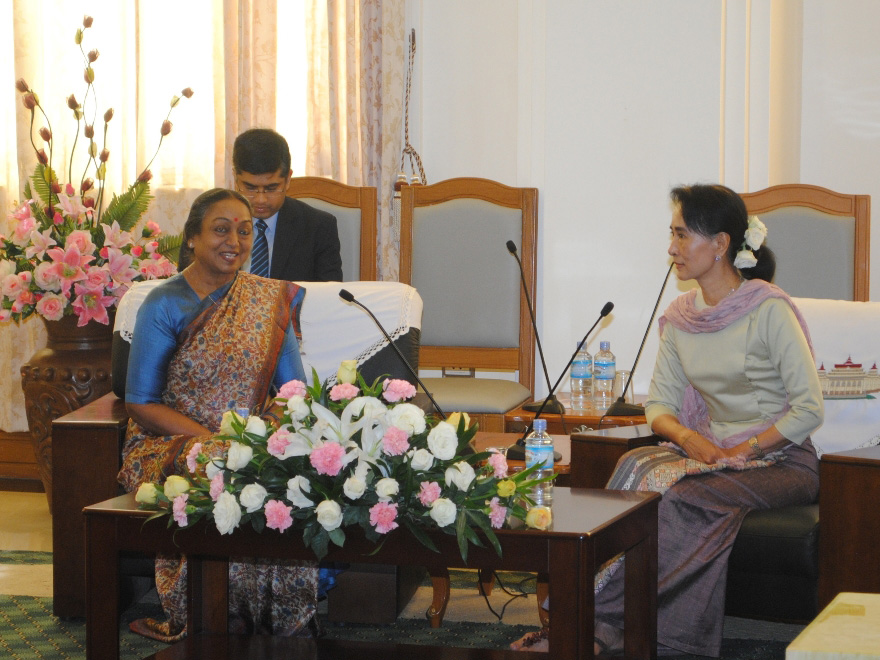
Kumar meeting Burmese leader Aung Suu Kyi in 2013.

Kumar entered electoral politics in 1985, when she received an Indian National Congress' nomination for the Lok Sabha from the Bijnor constituency bye-poll in Uttar Pradesh. She defeated, as a newcomer, two veteran dalit leaders including Ram Vilas Paswan of the Janata Dal and Mayawati of the Bahujan Samaj Party. Following her election to the Lok Sabha, Kumar was appointed as member of the Ministry of External Affairs' Consultative Committee in 1986.

Meera Kumar lost elections for 9th Lok Sabha (1989) and 10th Lok Sabha from Sasaram, but went on to win elections for the 11th (in 1996) and the 12th Lok Sabhas from Karol Bagh in Delhi. She lost her seat to the candidate from the Bhartiya Janata Party in 1999 election, but was able re-elected with a significant majority from her father's former constituency of Sasaram in Bihar in 2004 and 2009. In the 2014 general election and in 2019, Kumar contested from Sasaram and lost both times to her nemesis Chhedi Paswan who has defeated her in Sasaram four times.

Following the Congress party's win in the 2004 Indian general elections, Kumar served in the United Progressive Alliance's Government as the Minister of Social Justice and Empowerment from 2004 to 2009, under the premiership of Manmohan Singh.

She entered active politics in the year 1985. She has been a Lok Sabha MP five times. She has also been a minister in the central government.

In 2009, the United Progressive Alliance returned to power after an improved performance in the general election and Kumar was, on 22 May 2009, briefly inducted as member of the centre's cabinet as the Minister for Water Resources.

However, she was later nominated for the position of the Speaker of Lok Sabha and she submitted her resignation three days after assuming ministerial office. Kumar was then elected as the first ever woman speaker of Lok Sabha and remained in office from 2009 to 2014.

==== 2017 presidential election ====
Kumar secured the United Progressive Alliance's nomination for the 2017 Indian presidential election, becoming just the third woman to be nominated for president of India by a major political bloc, (Note: While Lakshmi Sahgal was also nominated by the Left Front during the 11th presidential election, she secured only 10 percent of the total votes polled.) after Pratibha Patil. Although she received support from most of the major opposition parties for her election to the office, she went on to lose to the National Democratic Alliance nominee Ram Nath Kovind.

Kovind received a total of 2,930 votes (which included both Members of Parliament and Members of the Legislative Assemblies) amounting to electoral college votes of 702,044. He defeated Kumar, who received a total of 1,844 votes amounting to 367,314 votes in terms of electoral college.

| Party (Alliance) | Candidate | Electoral Votes | Vote Percentage | States carried |
|---|---|---|---|---|
| BJP (NDA) | Ram Nath Kovind | 702,044 | 65.65% | 21 |
| INC (UPA) | Meira Kumar | 367,314 | 34.35% | 10 |

==== National Legislators' Conference ====
- In September 2022, Meira Kumar was appointed a key patron of NLC Bharat.

== Lok Sabha electoral history ==
Meira Kumar has been elected 5 times as Lok Sabha MP. She lost from Sasaram in 2019.

| # | Term start | Term end | Position | Party |
|---|---|---|---|---|
| 1. | 1985 | 1989 | MP (1st term) in 8th Lok Sabha from Bijnor (by-poll) | INC |
| 2. | 1996 | 1998 | MP (2nd term) in 11th Lok Sabha from Karol Bagh | INC |
| 3. | 1998 | 1999 | MP (3rd term) in 12th Lok Sabha from Karol Bagh | INC |
| 4. | 2004 | 2009 | MP (4th term) in 14th Lok Sabha from Sasaram | INC |
| 5. | 2009 | 2014 | MP (5th term) in 15th Lok Sabha from Sasaram | INC |

== See also ==
- List of Jatavs
- Navtej Sarna
- Taranjit Singh Sandhu
- Harsh Vardhan Shringla
- List of politicians from Bihar

Lok Sabha
| Preceded by Chowdhary Girdhari Lal | Member of Parliament for Bijnor; 1985–1989 | Succeeded by Mayawati |
| Preceded by Kalka Dass | Member of Parliament for Karol Bagh; 1996–1999 | Succeeded by Anita Arya |
| Preceded by Muni Lall | Member of Parliament for Sasaram; 2004–2014 | Succeeded by Chhedi Paswan |
Political offices
| Preceded by Satyanarayan Jatiya | Union Minister of Social Justice and Empowerment; 22 May 2004 – 22 May 2009 | Succeeded by Selja Kumari |
| Preceded by Saifuddin Soz | Union Minister of Water Resources; 22 May 2009 – 25 May 2009 | Succeeded by Pawan Kumar Bansal |
| Preceded by Somnath Chatterjee | Speaker of the Lok Sabha; 4 June 2009 – 4 June 2014 | Succeeded by Sumitra Mahajan |
