= Chhedi Paswan =

Indian politician (born 1956)

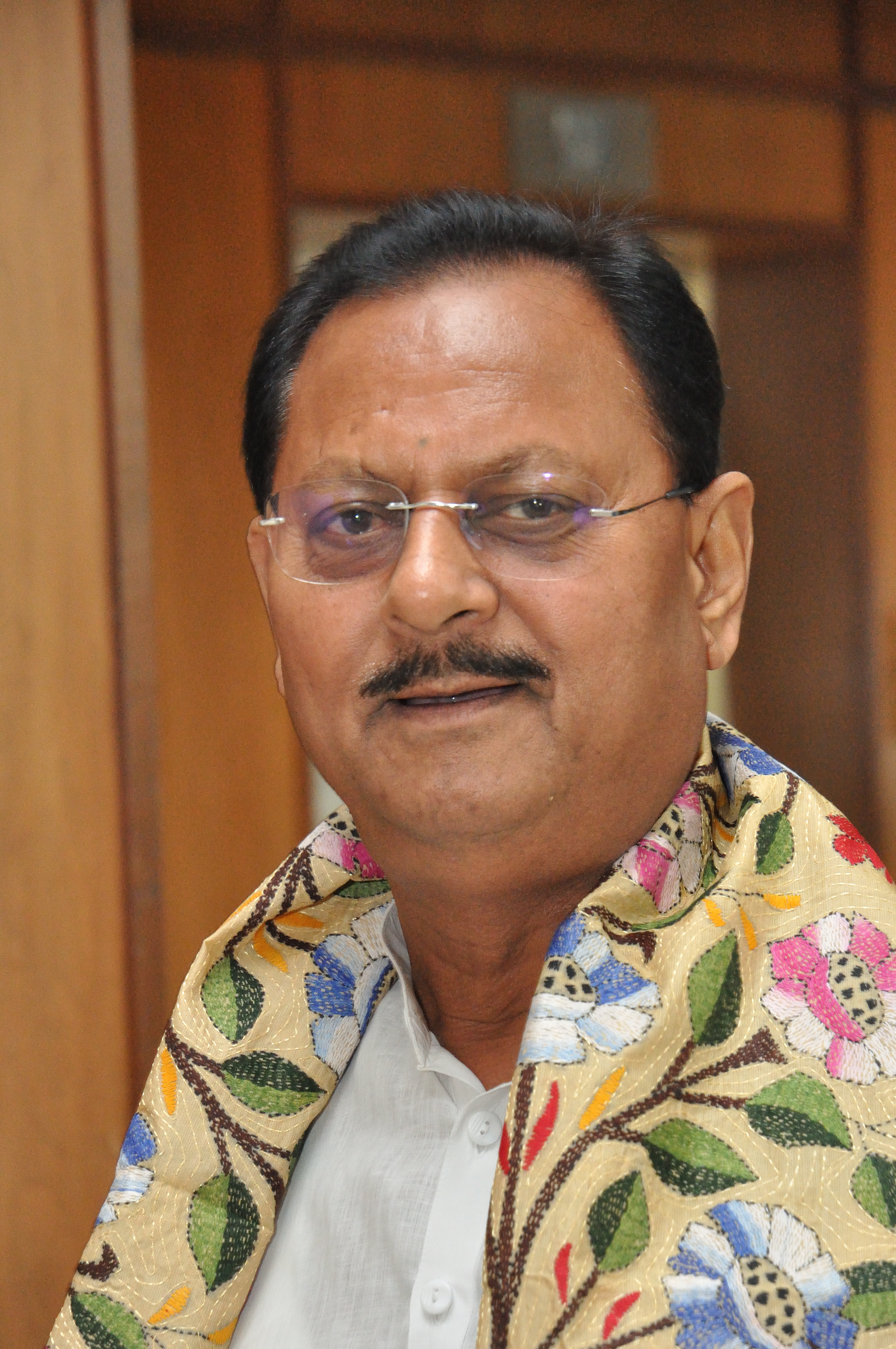
- Paswan in 2017

Member of Parliament, Lok Sabha
- In office 16 May 2014 – 4 June 2024
- Preceded by: Meira Kumar
- Succeeded by: Manoj Kumar
- Constituency: Sasaram
- In office 1989–1996
- Preceded by: Jagjivan Ram
- Succeeded by: Muni Lall
- Constituency: Sasaram

Personal details
- Born: 4 February 1956 (age 70) Sasaram, Bihar, India
- Party: Bharatiya Janata Party (2014-present)
- Other political affiliations: Janata Dal (United)
- Spouse: Premkali Devi
- Children: 5
- Education: Patna University
- Profession: Social Worker

Chhedi Paswan (born 4 February 1956) is a former member of 16th Lok Sabha and a former member of Bihar Legislative Assembly. He represented the Bharatiya Janata Party (BJP) from 2014 to 2024. At various points, he has been with Janata Party, then its Charan Singh faction, then the reunited Janata Dal, Bahujan Samaj Party, Nationalist Congress Party, Lalu Prasad Yadav's RJD and Nitish Kumar's JD(U).

== Career ==
He lost 1980 Bihar vidhan sabha election as member of Charan Singh faction from Chenari constituency. Between 1985 and 1989, he was a Member of the Legislative Assembly of Bihar, where he represented the Lok Dal party from the Chenari. He was Secretary General of the Yuva Lok Dal in Bihar between 1987 and 1989.

Paswan was elected to the Lok Sabha, the lower house of the Parliament of India, in 1989 and 1991 as a Janata Dal candidate from Sasaram constituency, defeating Meira Kumar of the Indian National Congress party on both occasions. He lost the 1996 Lok Sabha election to Muni Lall of the BJP. He also lost Lok Sabha election from Sasaram in 1998 as member of NCP and in 1999 as member of BSP. He was then elected to Bihar Vidhan Sabha (2000–2005) from Chenari as member of Lalu Prasad's RJD. He then joined Nitish Kumar's Janata Dal (United) and lost election from Mohania seat in February 2005, and won from there in October 2005 and 2010.

He defected to the BJP in 2014 from Janata Dal (United) after alleging party leader Nitish Kumar was acting in an autocratic manner. He contested the 2014 Lok Sabha election and won the Sasaram seat but the victory was set aside by the Patna High Court on the grounds that his election affidavit did not mention criminal cases pending against him. The Supreme Court of India stayed the order but Paswan's voting rights were not restored, which prevented him from voting in the 2017 presidential elections.

== Personal life ==
Paswan was born on 4 February 1956 in Sasaram to Ramchandra Paswan and Laxmina Devi. He was awarded a M.A. degree in labour and social welfare from the Patna University. He is married to Premkali Devi. He has three sons and two daughters.
