= Bharatiya Dalit Sahitya Akademi =

- Formation: 1984
- Type: NGO
- Purpose: Dalit literature, art and culture
- Headquarters: New Delhi, India
- Location: New Delhi, India
- Region served: India
- President: Dr. S. P. Sumanakshar
- Publication: Indian Literature
- Parent organisation: Ministry of Culture, Government of India

Bharatiya Dalit Sahitya Akademi is an academic organization dedicated to the promotion of Indian Dalit literature, art and culture in the languages of India. The organization is an all India Dalit writers association established 1984. It was founded by Jagjivan Ram, the 4th deputy prime minister of India.

== Aim ==
The Akademi was established for fulfilling the unaccomplished dream of B. R. Ambedkar to alleviate the discrimination faced by Dalits.

== Controversy ==
The members of the Akademi publicly burned multiple copies of the famed novel Rangbhoomi, written by Premchand on 31 July 2004 at Jantar Mantar park in New Delhi. This incident made a maelstrom and provoked the traditional literary establishments and it was caused to divide the Akademi to many Dalit organizations all over in India.

== National executives ==
- President: Dr. S. P. Sumanakshar (founder president)
- General secretary: Prof. Jay Sumanakshar

=== List of state presidents ===
Following people served as state presidents of the organization:

No.	Name	State
1	G. Dhanasekhar	Andhra Pradesh
2	G.P. Upadhayaya	Arunachal Pradesh
3	B.L. Rabidas	Assam
4	Jaga Ram Shastri	Bihar
5	G.R. Banjare Jwala	Chhattisgarh
6	Gurmeet Singh Jaura	Chandigarh
7	Dr. Rajmal Singh Raj	Delhi
8	Shambhu Bhau Bandekar	Goa
9	Jayavant Singh Mahipatsingh Jadeja	Gujarat
10	Gurudyal Singh Morthala	Haryana
11	Adv. Dalip Singh	Himachal Pradesh
12	Dr. Raju Ram	Jharkhand
13	Sudesh Kumari	Jammu and Kashmir
14	H.M. Kundargi	Karnataka
15	T. Balakrishnan	Kerala
16	P.C. Bairwa	Madhya Pradesh
17	Anand Gavali	Maharashtra
18	R. K. Gunchandra	Manipur
19	Rajmani Nongthomba	Meghalaya
20	Khaidem Kanta Singh	Mizoram
21	R.K. Gunachandra	Nagaland
22	Premraj Nial	Orissa
23	Dr. P. Vasugi Jayaraman	Pondicherry
24	Tirath Tongaria	Punjab
25	Prof. Swami Atma Ram Upadhyay	Rajasthan
26	Dilkhush Ruchal	Sikkim
27	Dr. C.P. Desi	Tamilnadu
28	Sayan Saha	Tripura
29	Adv. Jitender Manu	Telangana
30	Dr. Lalati Devi	Uttar Pradesh
31	Prof. Jaipal Singh	Uttaranchal
32	Adv.Roshan Lal Arya	Uttrakhand
33	Arjun Sankar	West Bengal
34	Devji Jogi Bhai Tandel	Daman and Diu
35	Dr. Ajay Kumar Sonkar	Andaman and Nicobar Islands
36	B.L. Rabidas	North-East State's Committee
37	P. Vishnu Murthy	South India State's Committee

== Awards ==
- Dr. Ambedkar International Award
- Dr. Ambedkar National Award
- Dr. Ambedkar Distinguished Service award
- Dr. Ambedkar Sahityashree National Award
- Dr. Ambedkar Sewashree National Award
- Dr. Ambedkar Excellency National Award
- Dr. Ambedkar Fellowship National Award

=== Recipients ===
- Dalai Lama - Dr. Ambedkar International Award in 1991
- Santhome Higher Secondary School - Dr. Ambedkar Fellowship Award in 2010
- P.R. Salve - Dr. Ambedkar Distinguished Service award in 2012
- S.J. Jecob - Dr. Ambedkar International Award in 2019
- Akkavila Salim - Dr. Ambedkar National Award in 2013
- Palash Bandopadhyay - Dr. Ambedkar Sewashree National Award in 2021
- Subhash Das - Dr. Ambedkar Excellency National Award in 2023
- Karoor Soman - Dr. Ambedkar Sahityashree National Award in 2023
- Jimsith Ambalappad - Dr. Ambedkar National Award in 2024
- Sukhesh R. Pilla Dr. Ambedkar Sahityashree National Award in 2024
