= Anita Arya =

Indian politician

Anita Arya is an Indian politician who is a member of the Bharatiya Janata party. She represented Karol Bagh, Delhi in 13th Lok Sabha. She was Mayor of Delhi in 1999.

== Early life and education ==
Anita Arya was born on 26 January 1963, at Agra, Uttar Pradesh. She was born to father Kundan Lal Nimal and mother Premwati. She went to Smt. Singhuri Bal Girls Intermediate College in Agra for her 10th–12th standard education.

She received her PhD, M.A. and, B.A. from Agra College, Agra (Uttar Pradesh). She received her B.ED from Maharshi Dayanand University, Rohtak (Haryana). Her PhD thesis was titled "Sir Jadunath Sarkar- His Biography and contributions to Medieval Indian History".

== Career ==
=== Delhi ===
From February 1997 to October 1999 she served as a municipal councillor in New Delhi. She also served as the mayor of Delhi for a short period of time from April to October 1999, where she also continued in the Municipal Corporation as a deputy chairperson of the Education Committee.

During her time serving as mayor, she worked on creating better hygienic conditions and decreasing pollution. She also created better educational facilities at government-run schools. She also created special health care programs for women and children.

=== Lok Sabha ===
In 1999 she was elected to the 13th Lok Sabha from the Karol Bagh Lok Sabha Constituency. Karol Bagh being the only reserved constituency in Delhi, she was up against Meira Kumar, another Dalit woman who had previously won the constituency.

Her supporters are said to have chanted, "Here comes the Daughter of the Dalits!" during her campaign.

=== Committees ===
From 1999 to 2000 she served on the Committee on Railways. From 2000 to 2001 she served on the Committee on the Empowerment of Women. From 2000 to 2004 she was a member of the Consultative Committee of the Ministry of Mines and Minerals.

== Controversies ==
In 2001, Union Minister Shanta Kumar made casteist remarks against former President Bangaru Laxman. Anita Arya along with Ramnath Kovind and Ashok Pradhan had met with Bhartiya Janta Party president K. Jana Krishnamurthy to demand action against Kumar, for hurting Dalit sentiments and potentially losing a block of Dalit votes.

== Current roles ==
Anita Arya is only one of eight women in the Bharatiya Janta Party's National Executive Members.

She also has written a volume of three books titled "Indian Women", the volumes are "Society and Law", "Education and Empowerment", and "Work and Development".

She is also a non-official member of the New Delhi Municipal Council.

== Personal life ==
Anita Arya got married in 1990 to Parveen Chandra Arya. She has two children.

Her hobbies include reading books or magazines related to politics or religion. She also enjoys cooking, watching movies, and listening to the public.
