= Manoj Kumar (Sasaram politician) =

Indian politician

Member of Parliament, Lok Sabha
- Incumbent
- Assumed office 4 June 2024
- Preceded by: Chhedi Paswan
- Constituency: Sasaram

Personal details
- Born: 10 January 1983 (age 43) Sakari Kudra Kaimur Bihar
- Party: Indian National Congress
- Spouse: Manaki Devi (m. 30 May 1995)
- Children: 4 Sons, 1 Daughter
- Parent(s): Ramji Ram, Yashoda Devi
- Occupation: Agriculture

Manoj Kumar (born 1984) is an Indian politician who is member of 18th Lok Sabha. He is Member of Parliament of Lok Sabha from Sasaram.
