= Lalan Paswan =

Indian politician

Bihar Legislative Assembly
- In office February 2005 – September 2005
- Constituency: Chenari
- In office September 2005 - November 2010
- In office November 2015 - November 2020

Personal details
- Party: Bharatiya Janata Party
- Other political affiliations: Rashtriya Lok Samta Party; Janata Dal (United)

Lalan Paswan is an Indian politician. He was elected to the Bihar Legislative Assembly from Chenari constituency of Bihar in the February 2005 and October 2005 as a member of the Janata Dal (United) again 2015 Bihar Legislative Assembly election as a member of the Rashtriya Lok Samta Party.
