= Shyam Bihari Ram =

Indian politician

Shyam Bihari Ram is an Indian politician. He was elected to the Bihar Legislative Assembly from Chenari constituency of Bihar in the 2010 Bihar Legislative Assembly election as a member of the Janata Dal (United).
