= Biar Bandh =

Biar Bandh Biarbāndh
- village
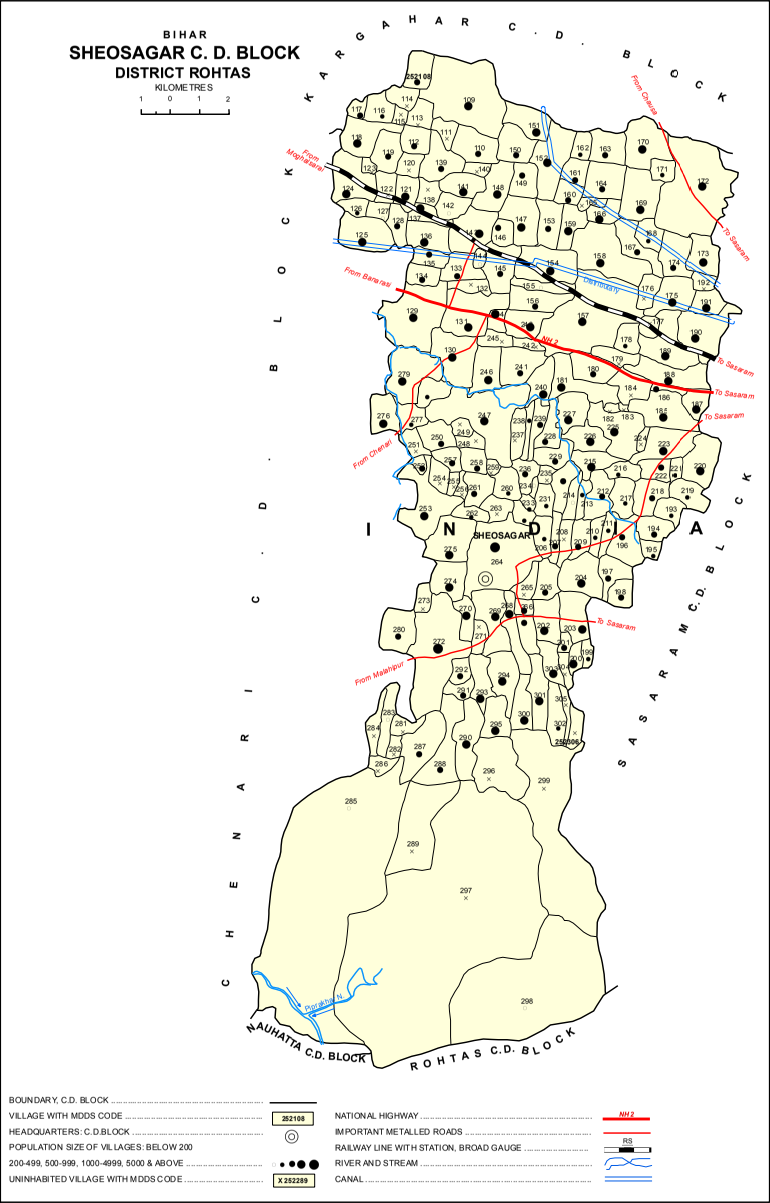
- Map showing Biar Bandh (#139) in Sheosagar block.

- Location in Bihar, India Biar Bandh (India)
- Coordinates: 25.02534°N 83.88299°E
- Country: India
- State: Bihar
- District: Rohtas

Area
  - Total: 1.72 km^{2} (0.66 sq mi)

Population
  - Total: 987
  - Density: 574/km^{2} (1,490/sq mi)

Languages
  - Official: Bhojpuri, Hindi
- Time zone: UTC+5:30 (IST)
- Postal code: 821111
- ISO 3166 code: IN-BR
- Vehicle registration: BR-24
- Coastline: 0 kilometres (0 mi)
- Nearest city: Sasaram

Biar Bandh is a village in Sheosagar block of Rohtas district in Bihar state, India. As of 2011, its population was 987, in 212 families.

== Agriculture ==
Biar Bandh has an agricultural credit society. It has 127.4 hectares of farmland, in addition to 1.3 hectares of permanent pasturage. Most of the land (103.4 hectares) was irrigated in 2011, mostly by canal.

== Amenities ==
As of 2011, Biar Bandh possessed a single primary school. It had no medical facilities or post office. Biar Bandh had both landline and cell phone coverage, but no internet access. Villagers had access to electricity, but not tap water; drinking water instead was provided by hand pump. It had no permanent pucca roads; rather, it had impermanent kutcha roads.
