= Muni Lall =

Indian politician (1938-2019)

Muni Lall मुनि लाल

Member of Parliament, Lok Sabha
- In office 1996–2004
- Preceded by: Chhedi Paswan
- Succeeded by: Meira Kumar
- Constituency: Sasaram, Bihar

Minister of State, Government of India
- In office 13 October 1999 – 22 May 2004
- Prime Minister: Atal Bihari Vajpayee
- Minister: Satyanarayan Jatiya
- MoS for: Ministry of Labour and Employment

Personal details
- Born: 6 August 1938 Bhojpur, Bihar Province, British India
- Died: 23 December 2019 (aged 81) Patna, Bihar, India
- Party: Bharatiya Janata Party
- Children: Shivesh Kumar
- Occupation: Indian Administrative Services

Muni Lall (6 August 1938 – 23 December 2019) was an Indian politician, minister and civil servant.

== Early life ==
He was born on 6 August 1938 to Ram Ashray Prasad at Bhojpur, Bihar Province, British India. He completed a B.A (Eco.) and an M.A (Pol. Sci) from Patna University. Later he was admitted to study for a PhD at the London School of Economics with a research topic on the "Development of Tribals through Co-operativization." But he did not submit a thesis for approval due to personal problems.

== Civil service ==
He got selected into civil services in and held the post of SDO, Land Reforms and SDM of Chas in Bihar government for 5 years.

Later he got promoted to ADM, Supply & Rationing, M.D of Bihar State Tribal Development Corporation, Bihar State Hill Area Lift Irrigation Corp. and BIADA (Bokaro). He was also DC and DM of Bokaro district. He was then promoted to Additional Secretary, Special Secretary and Secretary in Dept. of Planning & Development in Bihar Government.

== Political career ==
He took voluntary retirement in 1996 to join politics and held position as National President in BJP of Scheduled Caste Morcha.

In 1996, he became Member of Parliament into Lok Sabha representing Sasaram constituency. In 1998, he was re-elected from same seat and again in 1999 Lok Sabha elections. In 1999, he was appointed as Union Minister of State for Labour & Employment. He also served as -

- Member of Standing Committee on Energy
- Member of Consultative Committee, Ministry of Coal
- Member of Standing Committee on Industry
- Member of Committee on Welfare of Scheduled Caste and Scheduled Tribes

=== Seminars attended ===
He attended 88th Session of the ILC of International Labour Organization, 89th Session of the ILC of International Labour Organization, 90th Session of the ILC of International Labour Organization and 37th Session of the Indian Labour Conference.

He died at Paras Hospital in Patna district, Bihar.
