= Jagjivan Ram =

Indian independence activist and politician (1908–1986)

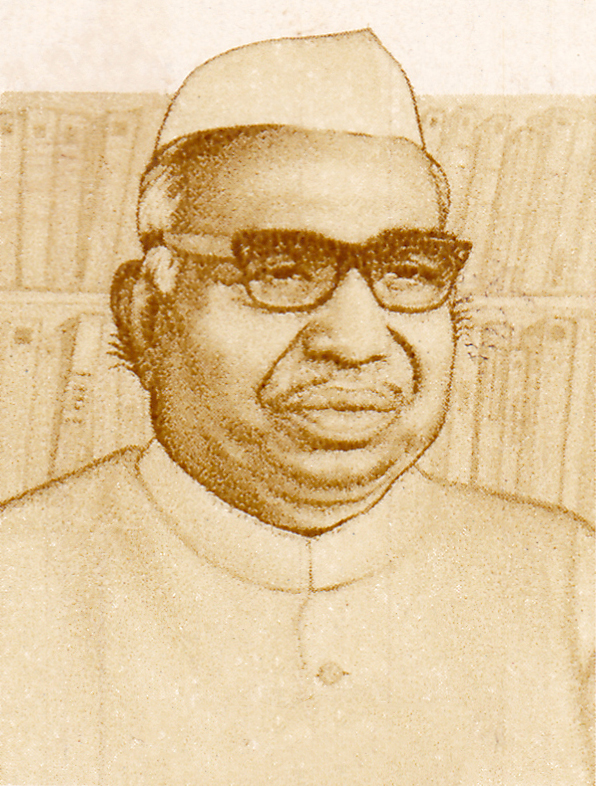
- Ram on a commemorative stamp of India

Deputy Prime Minister of India
- In office 24 January 1979 – 28 July 1979 Serving with Charan Singh
- Prime Minister: Morarji Desai
- Preceded by: Morarji Desai
- Succeeded by: Yashwantrao Chavan

Leader of the Opposition in Lok Sabha
- In office 29 July 1979 – 22 August 1979
- Preceded by: Yashwantrao Chavan
- Succeeded by: Rajiv Gandhi

Union Minister of Defence
- In office 27 June 1970 – 10 October 1974
- Prime Minister: Indira Gandhi
- Preceded by: Sardar Swaran Singh
- Succeeded by: Sardar Swaran Singh
- In office 24 March 1977 – 28 July 1979
- Prime Minister: Morarji Desai
- Preceded by: Bansi Lal
- Succeeded by: Chidambaram Subramaniam

Union Minister of Agriculture and Irrigation
- In office 13 March 1967 – 27 June 1970
- Prime Minister: Indira Gandhi
- Preceded by: Chidambaram Subramaniam
- Succeeded by: Fakhruddin Ali Ahmed
- In office 10 October 1974 – 2 February 1977
- Prime Minister: Indira Gandhi
- Preceded by: Chidambaram Subramaniam
- Succeeded by: Indira Gandhi

Member of Parliament, Lok Sabha
- In office 1952 – 1957
- Preceded by: Constituency established
- Succeeded by: Ram Subhag Singh
- Constituency: Shahabad South, Bihar
- In office 1962 – 1986
- Preceded by: Ram Subhag Singh
- Succeeded by: Chhedi Paswan
- Constituency: Sasaram, Bihar

Member of Constituent Assembly of India
- In office 9 December 1946 – 24 January 1950
- President: Rajendra Prasad
- Preceded by: Assembly established
- Succeeded by: Assembly dissolved

Personal details
- Born: 5 April 1908 Arrah, Bengal Presidency, British India (present-day Bihar, India)
- Died: 6 July 1986 (aged 78) New Delhi, Delhi, India
- Party: Indian National Congress-Jagjivan (1981–1986)
- Other political affiliations: Indian National Congress (until 1977); Congress for Democracy (1977); Janata Party (1977–1981)
- Spouse: Indrani Devi (m. 1935; died 1986)
- Children: 3; including Meira Kumar
- Education: Banaras Hindu University; University of Calcutta

Jagjivan Ram (5 April 1908 – 6 July 1986), popularly known as Babuji, was an Indian independence activist and politician who served as a minister with various portfolios for over 30 years, making him the longest-serving Union Cabinet minister in Indian history. He also served as the Deputy Prime Minister of India from January to July 1979. He played a pivotal role as the Defence Minister of India during the Indo-Pak War of 1971. As Union Agriculture Minister during two separate tenures, he contributed significantly to the Green Revolution and the modernization of Indian agriculture, particularly during the 1974 drought when he was entrusted with addressing a severe food crisis.

He was instrumental in the foundation of the All India Depressed Classes League, an organisation dedicated to attaining equality for Dalits, in 1935 and was elected to Bihar Legislative Assembly in 1937, after which he organised the rural labour movement. In 1946, he became the youngest minister in Jawaharlal Nehru's interim government, the first cabinet of India as a Labour Minister and also a member of the Constituent Assembly of India, where he ensured that social justice was enshrined in the Constitution. He went on to serve as a minister with various portfolios till 1979 as a member of the Indian National Congress (INC).

Though he opposed Prime Minister Indira Gandhi during the Emergency (1975–77), he left Congress in 1977 and joined the Janata Party alliance, along with his Congress for Democracy and later served as the Deputy Prime Minister of India (1977–79); then in 1981, he formed Congress (J). At his death, he was the last surviving minister of the Interim Government and the last surviving original member of the first cabinet of independent India.

== Early life and education ==
Jagjivan Ram was born on April 5, 1908 in Chandwa village near Ara, the headquarters of Shahabad district of Bengal Presidency (now Bhojpur (Ara) district of Bihar) into a family belonging to the Chamar community. He had an elder brother, Sant Lal, and three sisters. His father Sobhi Ram was with the British Indian Army, posted at Peshawar, but later resigned due to some differences, and bought farming land in his native village Chandwa and settled there. He also became a Mahant of the Shiv Narayani sect, and being skilled in calligraphy, illustrated many books for the sect that were distributed locally.

Young Jagjivan attended a local school in January 1914. Upon the premature death of his father, Jagjivan and his mother Vasanti Devi were left in a harsh economic situation. He joined Aggrawal Middle School in Arrah in 1920, where the medium of instruction was English for the first time, and joined Arrah Town School in 1922. It was here that he faced caste discrimination for the first time, yet remained unfazed. An often cited incident occurred in this school; there was a tradition of having two water pots in the school, one for Hindus and another for Muslims. Jagjivan drank water from the Hindu pot, and because he was from an untouchable class, the matter was reported to the Principal, who placed a third pot for dalits in the school. Jagjivan broke this pot twice in protest, until the Principal decided against placing the third pot. A turning point in his life came in 1925, when Pt. Madan Mohan Malviya visited his school, and impressed by his welcome address, invited him to join the Banaras Hindu University.

Jagjivan Ram passed his matriculation in the first division and joined the Banaras Hindu University (BHU) in 1927, where he was awarded the Birla scholarship, and passed his Inter Science Examination. While at BHU, he organised the scheduled castes to protest against social discrimination. As a Dalit student, he was denied basic services like meals in his hostel and haircuts by local barbers. A Dalit barber would arrive occasionally to trim his hair. Eventually, Jagjivan left BHU and continued his education at Calcutta University. In 2007, the BHU set up a Babu Jagjivan Ram Chair in its faculty of social sciences to study caste discrimination and economic backwardness.

He received a B. Sc. degree from the University of Calcutta in 1931, where again he organised conferences to draw attention toward issues of discrimination, and also participated in the anti-untouchability movement started by Mahatma Gandhi.

== Early career ==
Netaji Subhash Chandra Bose took notice of him at Kolkata, when in 1928 he organised a Mazdoor Rally at Wellington Square, in which approximately 50,000 people participated. When the devastating 1934 Nepal–Bihar earthquake occurred he got actively involved in the relief work and his efforts were appreciated. When popular rule was introduced under the 1935 Act and the scheduled castes were given representation in the legislatures, both the nationalists and the British loyalists sought him because of his first-hand knowledge of the social and economic situation in Bihar. Jagjivan Ram was nominated to the Bihar Council. He chose to go with the nationalists and joined Congress, which wanted him not only because he was valued as an able spokesperson for the depressed classes, but also that he could counter B. R. Ambedkar; he was elected to the Bihar assembly in 1937. However, he resigned his membership on the issue of irrigation cess. He criticized Ambedkar as a "coward" who could not lead his people.

In 1935, he contributed to the establishment of the All-India Depressed Classes League, an organisation dedicated to attaining equality for untouchables. He was also drawn into the Indian National Congress. In the same year he voted in favor of a resolution presented in the 1935 session of the Hindu Mahasabha demanding that temples and drinking water wells be opened up to Dalits; and in the early 1940s was imprisoned twice for his active participation in the Satyagraha and the Quit India Movements. He was among the principal leaders who publicly denounced India's participation in the World War II between the European nations and for which he was imprisoned in 1940.

== Role in the Constitution ==
In the Constituent Assembly he advocated for the rights of Dalits and argued for affirmative action based on caste in elected bodies and government services.

== Parliamentary career ==
In 1946, he became the youngest minister in Jawaharlal Nehru's provisional government and also the subsequent First Indian Cabinet, as a Labour Minister, where he is credited with laying the foundation for several labour welfare policies in India. He was a part of the prestigious high-profile Indian delegation that attended the International Labour Organization (ILO)'s International Labour Conference on 16 August 1947 in Geneva, along with the great Gandhian Bihar Bibhuti Dr. Anugrah Narayan Sinha, his chief political mentor and also the then head of the delegation, and a few days later he was elected President of the ILO. He served as Labour minister until 1952. He was member of the Constituent assembly that drafted India's constitution. Ram also served in the interim national government of 1946. Later, he held several ministerial posts in Nehru's Cabinet – Communications (1952–56), Transport and Railways (1956–62), and Transport and Communications (1962–63).

In Indira Gandhi's government, he worked as minister for Labour, Employment, and Rehabilitation (1966–67), and Union Minister for Food and Agriculture (1967–70), where he is best remembered for having successfully led the Green Revolution during his tenure. When the Congress Party split in 1969, Jagjivan Ram joined the camp led by Indira Gandhi, and became the president of that faction of Congress. He worked as the Minister of Defence (1970–74) making him the virtual No. 2 in the cabinet, Minister for Agriculture and Irrigation (1974–77). It was during his tenure as the minister of Defence that the Indo-Pakistani War of 1971 was fought, and Bangladesh gained independence. While loyal to prime minister Indira Gandhi for most of the Indian Emergency, in 1977 he along with five other politicians resigned from the Cabinet and formed the Congress for Democracy party, within the Janata coalition.

A few days before the elections, on a Sunday, Jagjivan Ram addressed an Opposition rally at the famous Ram Lila Grounds in Delhi. The national broadcaster Doordarshan allegedly attempted to stop crowds from participating in the demonstration by telecasting the blockbuster movie Bobby. The rally still drew large crowds, and a newspaper headline the next day ran "Babu beats Bobby". He was the Deputy Prime Minister of India when Morarji Desai was the prime minister, from 1977 to 1979. Though initially reluctant to join the cabinet, he was not present at the oath-taking ceremony on 24 March 1977, but he eventually did so at the behest of Jai Prakash Narayan, who insisted that his presence was necessary, "not just as an individual but as a political and social force." However, he was once again given the defence portfolio. His last position in government was as Deputy Prime Minister of India in the Janata Party government of 1977–1979.

In 1978, explicit photos of his son Suresh Ram with Sushma Chaudhary were published on Surya magazine. This incident is said to have significantly damaged the career of Jagjivan Ram and contributed to the split in the Janata Party.

When the split in Janata Party forced an early General Election in 1980, Janata Party contested it with Jagjivan Ram as its Prime Ministerial candidate, but the party won only 31 seats out of 542. Disillusioned with the Janata party he joined Congress (Urs) faction. In 1981, he separated from that faction as well, and formed his own party, the Congress (J).

He remained a member of Parliament right from the first election in 1952 till his death in 1986, after over forty years as a parliamentarian. He was elected from Sasaram parliament constituency in Bihar. His uninterrupted representation in the Parliament from 1936 to 1986 is a world record.

== Positions held ==
=== Politics and government ===
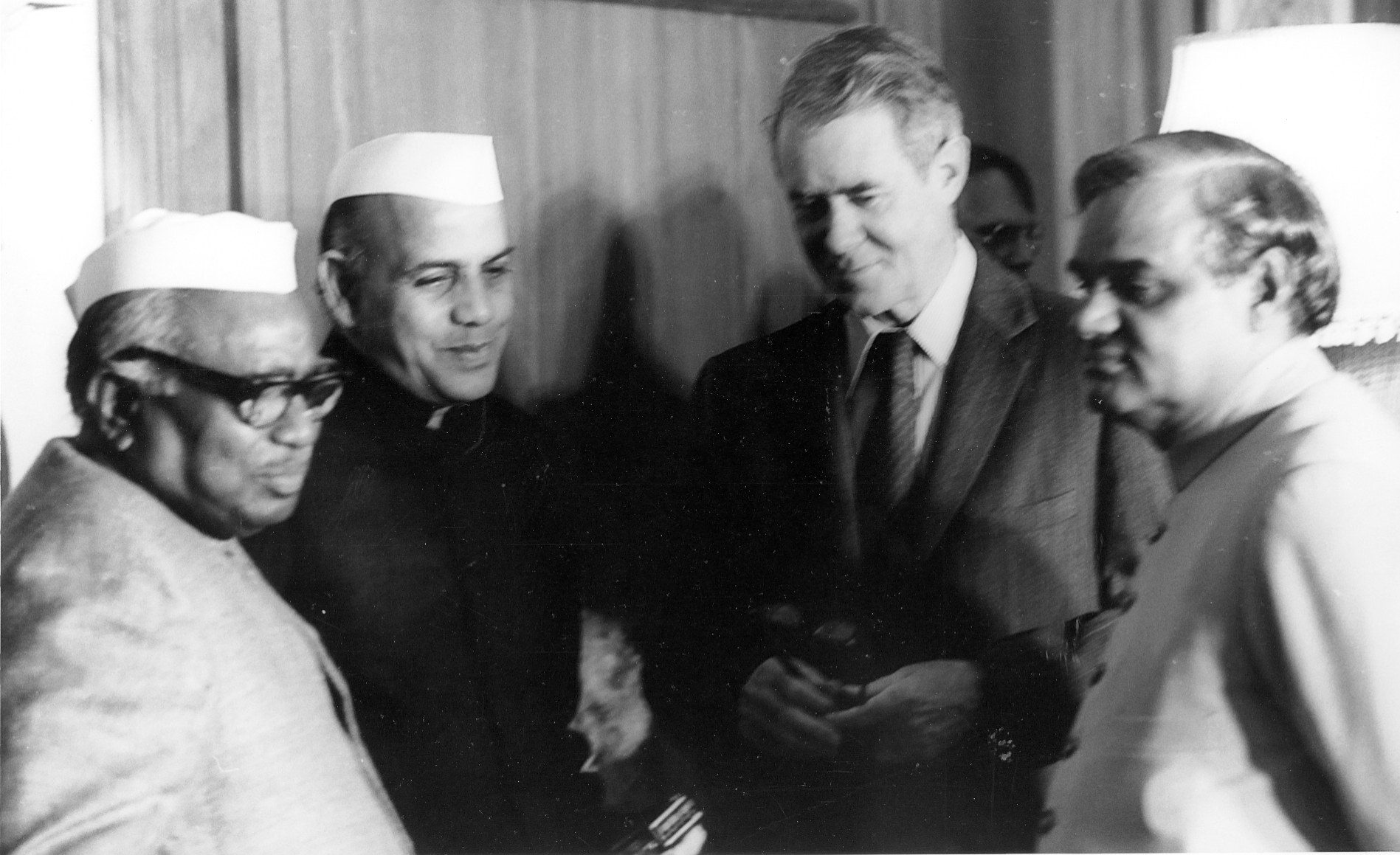
Left-right: Indian Defense Minister Jagjivan Ram, Indian Minister of Commerce Mohan Dharia, U.S. Secretary of State Cyrus Vance, and Indian Minister of external Affairs Atal Bihari Vajpayee

- Member of the Central Legislature for over 30 years consecutively.
- He holds the record for being the longest-serving cabinet minister in India.
- Union Minister of Labour, 1946–1952.
- Union Minister for Communications, 1952–1956.
- Union Minister for Transport and Railways, 1956–1962.
- Union Minister for Transport and Communications, 1962–1963.
- Union Minister for Labour, Employment and Rehabilitation, 1966–1967.
- Union Minister for Food and Agriculture, 1967–1970.
- Union Minister of Defence, 1970–1974, 1977–1979.
- Union Minister of Agriculture and Irrigation, 1974–1977.
- President of Indian National Congress
- Founding Member, Congress for Democracy party (aligned with Janata Party), 1977.
- Deputy Prime Minister of India, 24 January 1979 – 28 July 1979.
- Founder, Congress (J).

=== Other positions held ===
- He served as President of the Bharat Scouts and Guides from September 1976 to April 1983.

== Election Contested ==
=== Lok Sabha ===
| Year | Constituency | Party | Votes | % | Opponent | Opponent Party | | Opponent Votes | % | Result | Margin | % |
|---|---|---|---|---|---|---|---|---|---|---|---|---|
| 1957 | Sasaram | INC | —N/a | —N/a | Unopposed | —N/a | —N/a | —N/a | —N/a | Won | —N/a | |
| 1962 | Sasaram | INC | 137,060 | 54.27 | Rameshwar Agnibhoj | | SWA | 83,065 | 32.89 | Won | 53,995 | 21.38 |
| 1967 | Sasaram | INC | 149,355 | 53.90 | S. Ram | | PSP | 38,689 | 13.96 | Won | 110,666 | 39.94 |
| 1971 | Sasaram | INC | 210,353 | 66.93 | Mahabir Pasawan | | INC(O) | 88,153 | 28.05 | Won | 122,200 | 38.88 |
| 1977 | Sasaram | BLD | 327,995 | 78.49 | Mungeri Lall | | INC | 84,185 | 20.15 | Won | 243,810 | 58.34 |
| 1980 | Sasaram | JP | 169,207 | 43.98 | Mahabir Paswan | | INC(I) | 118,037 | 30.68 | Won | 51,170 | 13.30 |
| 1984 | Sasaram | IC(S) | 207,275 | 48.25 | Mahabir Paswan | | INC | 205,903 | 47.93 | Won | 1,372 | 0.32 |

== Personal life ==
After the death of his first wife in August 1933 due to a brief illness, Jagjivan Ram married Indrani Devi, a daughter of Dr. Birbal, a well-known social worker of Kanpur. The couple had two children, Suresh Kumar (died in 1985) and Meira Kumar, a five-time Member of Parliament, who won from his former seat Sasaram in both 2004 and 2009, and became the first woman Speaker of Lok Sabha in 2009.

== Legacy ==
He founded the Bharatiya Dalit Sahitya Akademi to help uplift Dalits in India.

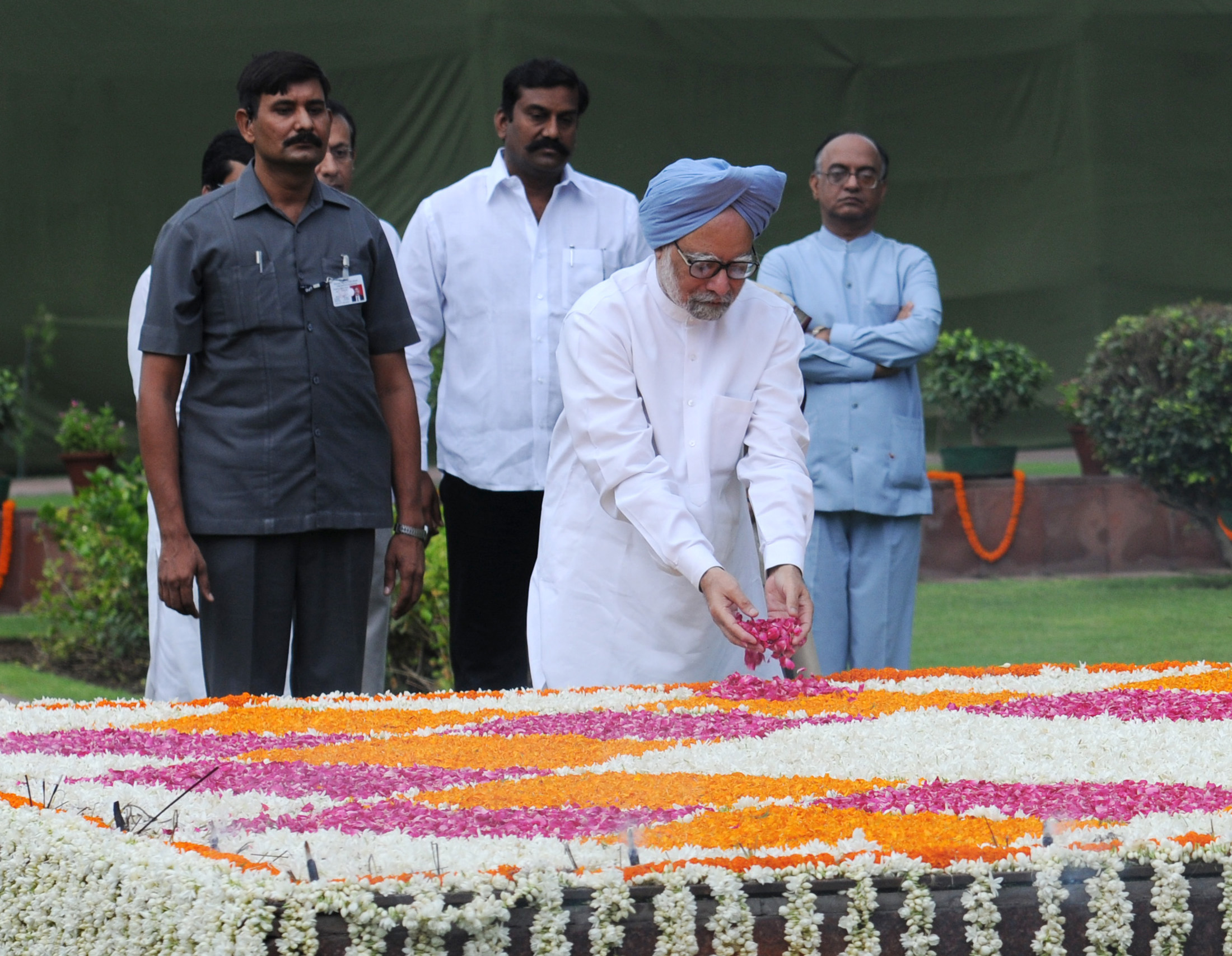
The Prime Minister, Dr Manmohan Singh paying floral tributes at the Samadhi of the former Deputy Prime Minister, Babu Jagjivan Ram, on his 24th death anniversary, at Samta Sthal in Delhi on 06 July 2010

The place of his cremation has been turned into a memorial, Samta Sthal, and his birth anniversary is observed as Samata Diwas (Equality Day) in India. His birth centenary celebrations were held all over the nation in 2008. Demands for awarding him a posthumous Bharat Ratna have been raised from time to time in Hyderabad. Andhra University conferred an honorary doctorate on him in 1973, and in 2009 on the occasion of his 101st birth anniversary, his statue was unveiled on the university premises.

To propagate his ideologies, the 'Babu Jagjivan Ram National Foundation' has been set up by Ministry of Social Justice, Govt. of India in Delhi.

The training academy for Railway Protection Force officers is named after Jagjivan Ram.

The first indigenously built electric locomotive, a WAM-1 model, was named after him and was recently restored by the Eastern Railway.

In 2015, the Babu Jagjeevan Ram English Medium Secondary School was established in Mahatma Gandhi Nagar, Yerawada, Pune. As of March 2016, the school serves 125 7th and 8th graders from Yerawada. The school honours Babuji and his advocacy of education and opportunity for all people of lower castes by being the first Pune Municipal Corporation public school to offer education past the 7th grade.

He also has a hospital named in his honour – Jagjivan Ram Hospital – in the Mumbai Central Area of Mumbai.

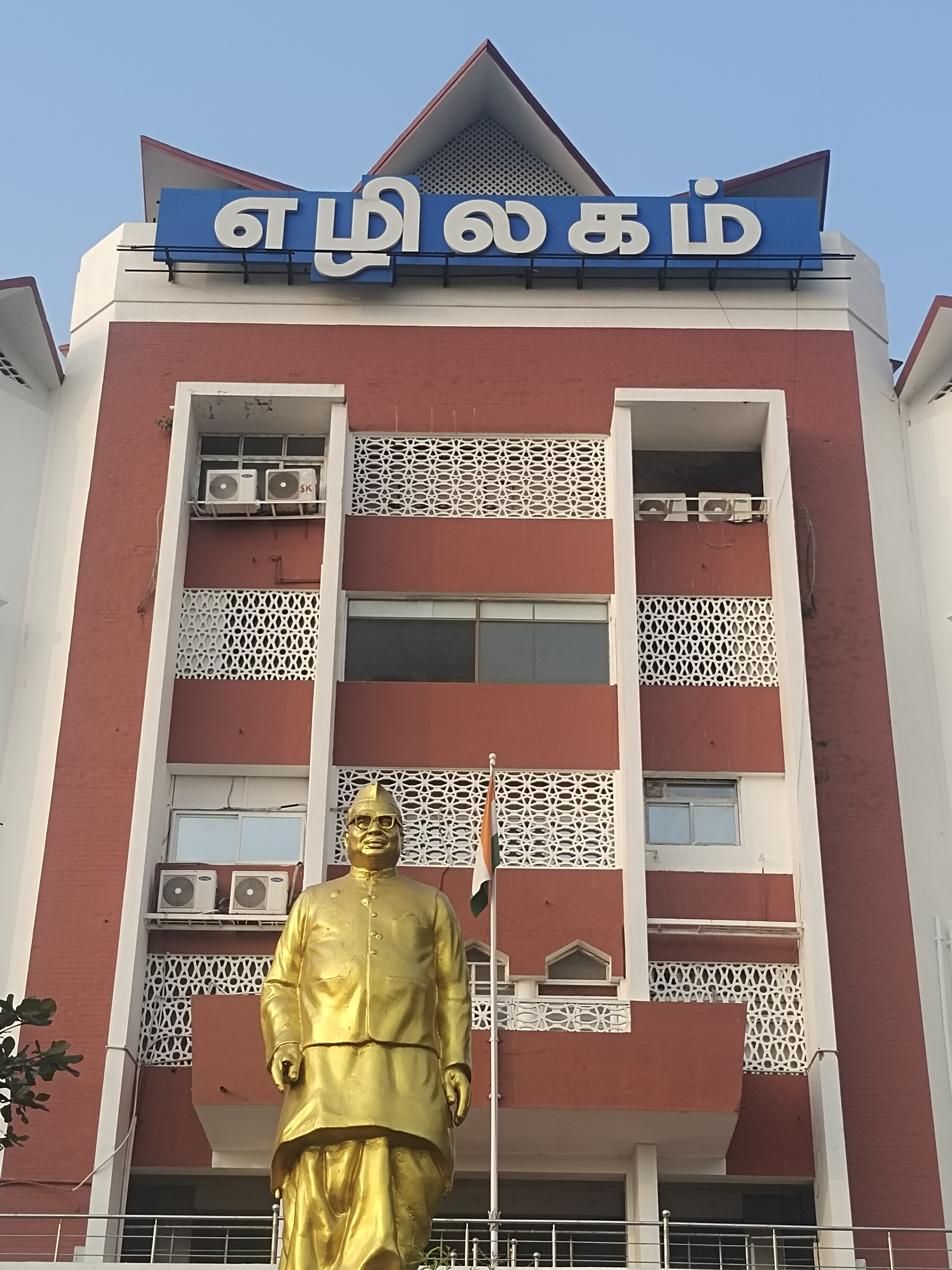
Statue of Babu Jagjivan Ram at Chennai Beach

== See also ==
- List of Jatavs
- List of politicians from Bihar
- Dalit people
- Chamar
- Ravidassia

== Further reading and bibliography ==
- Ram, Jagjivan; Shachi Rani Gurtu (1951). Jagjivan Ram on labour problems. Ram.
- Ram, Jagjivan (1980). Caste challenge in India. Vision Books.
- Sharma, Devendra Prasad (1974). Jagjivan Ram: the man and the times. Indian Book Co.
- Chanchreek, Kanhaiyalal (1975). Jagjivanram: a select bibliography, 1908–1975. S. Chand.
- Singh, Nau Nihal (1977). Jagjivan Ram: symbol of social change. Sundeep Prakashan.
- Ram, Jagjivan (1977). Four decades of Jagjivan Ram's parliamentary career. S. Chand.
- Ramesh Chandra, Sangh Mittra (2003). Jagjivan Ram And His Times. Commonwealth Publishers. ISBN 81-7169-737-2.
- Secretariat, Lok Sabha (2005). Babu Jagjivan Ram in parliament: a commemorative volume. Lok Sabha Secretariat.
- Maurya, Dr. Omprakash. Babu Jagjivan Ram. Publications Division, Govt. of India.
- Dr.U., Subramanian. Babu Jagjivan Ram. Tamilvendanpathippagam.
- "Valedictory Centenary Lecture by President of India on Jagjivan Ram Centenary Function". President of India website. 5 April 2008.
- "PM's Address at Babu Jagjivan Ram Centenary Seminar on Agriculture". ICAR. 7 February 2008.

Political offices
| Preceded by Bansi Lal | Minister of Defence; 1977–1979 | Succeeded by Chidambaram Subramaniam |
| Preceded by Morarji Desai | Deputy Prime Minister of India; 1979–1979; Served alongside: Charan Singh | Succeeded by Yashwantrao Chavan |
| Preceded by Sardar Swaran Singh | Minister of Defence; 1970–1974 | Succeeded by Sardar Swaran Singh |
Honorary titles
| Preceded by Dharma Vira | President of the Bharat Scouts and Guides; 1976–1983 | Succeeded by Shankarrao Chavan |
