= K.P. Ramaiah =

Karra Parasu Ramaiah (born 5 November 1954, Kanduru Palem) is an Indian politician and former civil servant.

K.P. Ramaiah hails from Andhra Pradesh. He studied at the Zilla Parishad School in Nellore District. Afterwards he studied economics at V.R. College (Nellore) and did postgraduate studies in political science at Sri Venkateswara University in Tirupati. He obtained a B.Ed. degree there, and began lecturing. In 1983 he began studying law at V.R. Law College. In 1986 he joined the Indian Administrative Service as a Bihar cadre. In 1989 he became SDO in Bhabhua. As a civil servant, he worked as District Magistrate of Patna and Divisional commissioner of Patna and Tirhut, later becoming the Principal Secretary of the SC & ST Department. He served as the secretary of the Mahadalit Commission, set up by Chief Minister Nitish Kumar to work for welfare amongst Dalit castes.

K.P. Ramaiah joined politics soon after his voluntary retirement from the IAS. He joined the Janata Dal (United) in early March 2014. He was fielded as the candidate of the JD(U) in the Sasaram Lok Sabha constituency in the 2014 general election.
