= Murari Prasad Gautam =

Indian politician

Minister of Panchayati Raj Government of Bihar
- In office 16 August 2022 – 28 January 2024
- Chief Minister: Nitish Kumar
- Preceded by: Samrat Chaudhary

Member of Bihar Legislative Assembly
- Incumbent
- Assumed office 2020
- Constituency: Chenari
- In office 2009–2010
- Constituency: Chenari

Personal details
- Born: 1 March 1980 (age 46) Rohtas, Bihar
- Party: LJP(RV)
- Other political affiliations: BJP, INC (pre-2024)
- Profession: Teacher

Murari Prasad Gautam is an Indian politician from Bihar currently serving as Member of Legislative Assembly in Bihar Legislative Assembly representing Chenari constituency.

Murari Prasad Gautam joined the BJP on 28 February 2024, ahead of the general elections. In 2025, he ran for reelection in Chenari constituency as a LJP(RV) candidate and won.
