= Sheosagar =

Sheosagar Shiusāgar
- Village
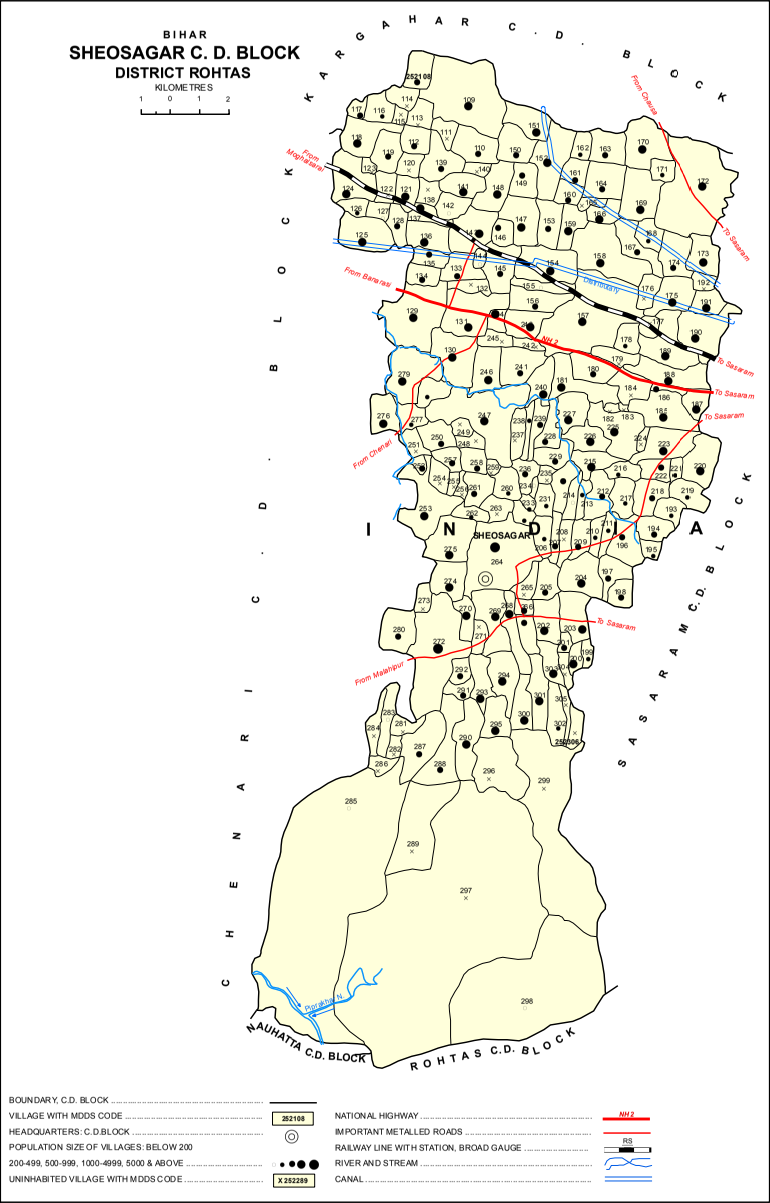

- Location in Bihar, India
- Coordinates: 24.97434°N 83.90632°E
- Country: India
- State: Bihar
- District: Rohtas

Population (2011)
  - Total: 2,065

Languages
  - Official: Hindi
  - Local: Bhojpuri
- Time zone: UTC+5:30 (IST)
- PIN: 821111

Sheosagar, also spelled Shiusagar or Shivsagar, is a village and corresponding community development block in Rohtas district of Bihar, India. As of 2011, the village of Sheosagar had a population of 2,065, in 345 households, while the entire block had a population of 176,080. The nearest major city is Sasaram, the capital of Rohtas district.

== Geography ==
Located in the western part of Rohtas district, Sheosagar block is geographically diverse, encompassing both parts of the Sasaram plain and areas of the Rohtas plateau, at the eastern end of the Vindhya Range. The area generally slopes downward toward the northeast.

== Demographics ==
Historical population
Year	Pop.	±%
2001	144,176	—
2011	176,080	+22.1%
Source: 2011 Census of India

Sheosagar is an entirely rural block, with no major urban centres. The sex ratio of the block in 2011 was 929, which was slightly higher than the average of 918 in all of Rohtas district. This ratio was more equal among 0- to 6-year-olds, with 953 females for every 1000 males; again, this was a bit higher than the district average of 931 for this age group. Members of scheduled castes made up 22.78% of the block's population (40,118 individuals), a slightly higher proportion than the district average of 20.11%. Members of scheduled tribes constituted 1.11% of the population (1,962 individuals), which was about equal to the district average of 1.12%. The literacy rate of Sheosagar block was 71.79%, which was slightly below the district average of 72.5%. Literacy was substantially higher among males (81.42%) than among females (61.37%); however, the 20.05% gender gap in literacy was slightly less pronounced than the district average of 21.04%.

The village of Sheosagar had a population of 2,065 in 2011, of whom 363 (17.58%) were in the 0–6 age group. The literacy rate of the town was 62.95%, with 1,300 people able to read and write (750 male and 550 female).

=== Employment ===
A majority of Sheosagar block's workforce was employed in agriculture, with 22.33% of the workforce being cultivators who owned or leased their own land and another 52.85% being agricultural labourers who worked someone else's land for wages. A further 4.14% were engaged in household industries, and all other forms of work accounted for the remaining 20.68% of the workforce.

In Sheosagar itself, there was a total workforce of 660 (483 men and 177 women) in 2011, of whom 442 (398 men and 44 women) were main workers and 218 (85 men and 133 women) were marginal workers. Between the two categories combined, there were 51 cultivators, 207 agricultural labourers, 45 household industry workers, and 357 other workers.

== Amenities ==
Of the 153 inhabited villages in Sheosagar block, 90 had schools, which was 58.82% of them; this was a lower rate than the district average of 70.24%. However, the population served by these schools consisted of 84.23% of the block's population, which was also lower than the Rohtas district average of 91.92%. Only 3 villages had medical facilities, which, at 1.96%, was far below the district average of 22.25%; the population they served was only 3.21% of the district, which was still far below the district average. Both percentages, in fact, were the lowest among all blocks in Rohtas district. All 153 villages had access to clean drinking water. 24 villages had post offices. 117 had telephone services, which at 76.47% was substantially higher than the district average of 47.7%; as much as 87.05% of the block's population had telephone access. 71 villages had transport communications (bus, rail, or navigable waterways). 18 villages had banks, and 16 had agricultural credit societies. 80 villages had permanent pucca roads. 134 villages had access to electricity, which was 87.58% of them, slightly higher than the district average of 82.24%; 94.15% of the block's population lived in villages with access to electricity. However, only 14.43% of block residents had electric lights; most (84.84%) households relied on kerosene for lighting instead.

53.43% of the block's household lived in permanent houses made of pucca materials in 2011, while 31.57% lived in semi-permanent houses and 14.7% lived in temporary houses made of kutcha materials. A large majority of households (90.83%) mainly used hand pumps for drinking water, with 3.47% using mainly tap water and 4.41% using mainly wells. A large majority of households had no toilet in their home, with 80.93% relying on open defecation; 14.4% had toilets connected to septic tanks and 1.45% had toilets connected to sewer systems. 23.5% of households had a kitchen in their home, while 70.26% did not. (The remainder mostly cooked outside the house.) Most households (73.44%) primarily used cowdung cake as fuel for cooking, while another 16.97% used mainly firewood. 53.39% of households had access to banks.

24.99% of households had radios, 17.13% had televisions, 0.52% had computers with internet access, 5.14% had computers with no internet access, 1.66% had landline telephones and 57.63% had cell phones (1.63% had both types of phone), 35.9% had bicycles, 7.71% had motor scooters, motorcycles, or mopeds, 11.84% had automobiles, and 27.76% had none of the aforementioned assets.

On 5 July 2017, Sheosagar block was declared "Open Defecation Free", with toilets installed in 16,232 households during the ODF campaign of the preceding six months. It was the sixth block in Rohtas to achieve this status.

The village of Sheosagar possessed two primary schools and four middle schools. It had one medical centre. It did not have well or tap water; water in the village was supplied by hand pump. There were no public toilets. There was a post office. Sheosagar was served by landline phone access as well as mobile phone coverage, and it had Internet access. There was bus service and a railway station. Residents had access to automobiles and tractors. The village was connected to national highways as well as state highways. It had pucca roads. There was an agricultural credit society. Sheosagar village possessed a daily mandi, but a weekly haat did not meet here. It had a community centre and a recreation centre with access to sports fields, and there was a public library. 38 hectares were under cultivation, which was all irrigated by canal.

== Villages ==
The sub-district of Sheosagar contains 153 inhabited villages and 46 uninhabited ones, for a total of 199 villages:

Village name	Total land area (hectares)	Population (in 2011)
Bhagwalia	91	990
Sondihra	115	970
Silari	526	2,009
Parasdiha	159	631
Bankat	61	0
Khairi Barki	84	927
Sonbarsa	68	0
Bhimpur	75	0
Hathigawan	30	0
Bardiha	78	398
Gopalapur	40	694
Masihabad	170	1,529
Akorha	134	632
Khairi Chhokti	76	0
Rasendua	77	1,313
Keshopur	68	0
Kandharapur	33	0
Auraiyan	223	1,204
Parari	166	1,280
Ramdehri	45	239
Misraulia	44	161
Nimia	73	630
Pakhnari	399	3,048
Chenari Chhokti	262	1,573
Bamhaur	242	2,197
Mahadehri	59	0
Paharpur	70	882
Jigna	93	560
Bahuwara	106	1,000
Gajaundha	77	1,026
Bhagwanpur	70	0
Biar Bandh	172	987
Pakri	38	0
Sahuwa	80	1,244
Dahuwa	104	140
Kurtha	178	1,102
Mauni	34	136
Baraila	175	965
Pariagpur	55	523
Chamraha	175	1,032
Dumri	159	1,577
Shahpur	100	581
Gamharia	135	519
Saina	136	1,146
Torana	240	1,421
Kekarha	116	566
Samahuta	254	1,353
Samahuti	75	25
Rajhain	133	946
Kirihiri	701	3,890
Patarhi	310	2,477
Admapur	102	1,038
Torni	76	560
Torni	71	659
Anantpura	62	430
Pipri	148	626
Chandanpura	155	915
Ibrahimpur	38	0
Mojri	84	1,117
Rampur Telari	149	667
Telara	71	487
Kaithi	209	1,703
Garura	228	1,342
Godnian	60	419
Konar	671	4,396
Berukahi	133	1,194
Dehara	149	878
Rampur Joi	157	1,004
Chitwar	66	0
Tiki Dihara	34	0
Bhairwa	79	205
Kaua Dehri	85	0
Auwan	102	746
Ghatkan	212	1,319
Rasulpur	18	0
Elahi Chak	10	0
Gorwar	118	0
Mor	210	1,347
Patti Chatarbhuj	39	651
Kanjrar	75	1,003
Sarae	185	2,030
Kumahu	253	2,648
Doriawan	227	1,286
Saidabad	93	1,042
Sikrauli	42	0
Kirihiri	79	293
Kaupa	90	688
Kewantarhi	43	266
Patarhi	153	842
Niu	96	595
Morkap	76	535
Khatolla	32	489
Rampur Amawan	48	1,483
Biura	36	835
Khurhia	124	1,364
Konki	145	1,129
Nad	189	1,625
Chanari	104	617
Semri Nagi	79	368
Semri Patak	62	877
Khanipur	57	0
Kajhawan	80	881
Kararipatti Garhi	57	442
Kararipatti Sharki	47	228
Banrua	130	932
Darangia	46	383
Manki	58	200
Senuwar	115	1,238
Barewa	66	424
Phalwaria	95	389
Kusahar	124	902
Burhharka	112	427
Semri	167	2,313
Pipari	34	440
Janjra	84	906
Karup	177	2,849
Ahmad Chak	20	0
Malwar	223	3,103
Marichwar	102	1,376
Rehi	114	1,086
Sonbarsa	90	513
Mauni	97	614
Saunja	92	592
Mitanda	73	393
Budhua	53	319
Chakia	21	383
Rampur	14	117
Sarae Bahan	26	0
Sewati	81	991
Isharpura	76	0
Chhuria	49	255
Madaini	67	620
Thanuan	91	1,080
Bhadarshila	163	695
Kusahi	47	0
Girdharia	114	1,224
Sheosagar (capital)	51	2,065
Kadwa	52	0
Chanua	151	1,306
Sonahar	486	4,839
Mahawar	42	0
Bhimakoni	36	0
Pakaria	88	675
Ahladpur	50	0
Shahpur	28	643
Sikraur	267	2,297
Keshopur	64	0
Arazi Sarae	32	0
Sarae Hewandhi	23	0
Baheri	63	696
Markan	80	538
Banahi	24	0
Patkhaulia	95	272
Naudiha	91	732
Bishunpur	55	289
Kusaha	81	0
Chor	499	6,473
Uchauli	63	0
Karma	42	778
Kala Shahar	80	795
Danrwa	129	1,235
Baddi	206	2,236
Amtha	76	1,124
Gamharia	48	0
Alampur	585	8,453
Sarean	61	0
Khurhnu	138	1,543
Majhui	209	2,170
Kekai	114	1,181
Maldaha	70	355
Pitambarpur	98	400
Mohanian	236	1,954
Kajhawan	179	687
Chamaraha	66	0
Bania Dih	38	0
Mahua Pokhar	109	183
Bahdimpur	86	0
Kusumha	2,997	106
Panari Dai	47	0
Sighanpura	209	844
Lutra	249	798
Khari Ghat	435	0
Ulho	192	2,169
Barka Dih	68	892
Kachnath	38	997
Gosahar	110	1,883
Murlipur	146	2,002
Sikandarpur	103	1,350
Tar Dih	294	0
Narwa	4,104	0
Chapri	1,461	66
Darshana	1,085	0
Mohammadpur	120	2,293
Bisrampur	130	3,270
Khardihan	115	431
Sukuhin	93	2,504
Dhanauti	34	0
Sigthi	44	0
Duba	55	0
