= Raghopur, Vaishali =

Community development block in Vaishali district, Bihar, India

Raghopur
- Community development block
- Location in Bihar, India
- Coordinates: 25.56°N 85.35°E
- Country: India
- State: Bihar
- District: Vaishali

Government
  - Type: Community development block
  - MLA: Tejashwi Yadav (RJD)
  - Member of Parliament: Chirag Paswan (LJP)(RV)
- Elevation: 46 m (151 ft)

Languages
  - Official: Bajjika, Hindi
- Time zone: UTC+5:30 (IST)
- PIN: 844508
- Telephone code: 06224
- ISO 3166 code: IN-BR
- Lok Sabha constituency: Hajipur
- Vidhan Sabha constituency: Raghopur

Raghopur is a community development block in Vaishali district of Bihar. Situated between two streams of the Ganges river, it is a river island. Ancient name of Raghopur is Kotigram.

== History ==
The creation and history of the Raghopur island are much older than previously thought, as recently Harappan-type bricks from Raghopur Diara were discovered. While digging for piling work to build a house at the Diara, around 10 km north of Patna, the landowner came across thousands of large bricks. He used some and kept the rest as samples out of curiosity. On 4 April 2017, the director of the state archaeological directorate, Atul Verma, visited the area and checked the samples. Vijay Kumar Choudhary, archaeologist and executive director of the Bihar Heritage Development Society, confirmed Harappan bricks had the proportions of 1:2:4 in terms of thickness, width, and length. He said the state archaeological directorate's move was a step in the right direction to establish that human settlements existed in the area. Raghopur Diara is situated between Chechar in the north and Didarganj in the south, places of archaeological importance. Chechar in Vaishali is a Neolithic site, while remains from the Mauryan period have been found during excavations at Didarganj in Patna.

== Demographics ==
As of the 2001 India census, Raghopur had a population of 187,722. Males constitute 54% of the population. Raghopur has an average literacy rate of 33%. The villages in Raghopur include Paharpur, Jurawanpur, Fatehpur, Birpur, Chaksingar, Rampur, and Shiv Nagar. Among all, Birpur is the largest village in this block.

== Notable people ==
- Uday Narayan Rai, Former Minister, Bihar
- Satish Kumar Yadav, Former MLA, Raghopur
- Rakesh Raushan, Politician

== Transport ==
The nearest towns to Raghopur are Patna, Hajipur and Bidupur. The nearest railway stations are Khoosarupur Fatuha and Bankaghat. The nearest airport is in Patna. There is only one seasonal road link (Pipa pul) that connects it to Patna, Fatuha. Apart from that, boats are a primary method of reaching the area. New Six lane Ganga bridge inaugurated in 2025 for all weather connection, kachchi dargah bidupur bridge. From didarganj to Himmatpur, Raghopur. In future this bridge extend to Nepal.
