= Prakash Veer =

Indian politician

Member of the Bihar Legislative Assembly
- In office 2015–2025
- Preceded by: Kanhaiya Kumar
- Succeeded by: Vimal Rajbanshi
- Constituency: Rajauli

Personal details
- Born: 25 December 1966 (age 59)
- Party: JJD (from 2025)
- Other political affiliations: RJD (till 2025)

Prakash Veer (born 25 December 1966) is an Indian politician and a member of Bihar Legislative Assembly from the Rajauli Assembly constituency. He was elected in 2015, again in 2020, but lost in 2025 to Vimal Rajbanshi, who ran as a LJP(RV) candidate. He was a member of the Rashtriya Janata Dal and new political party founded by Tej Pratap Yadav named Janshakti Janata Dal.
