= Rakesh Raushan =

Indian politician

State Vice-President, LJP (Ram Vilas), Bihar
- In office October 2021 – November 2024
- Preceded by: position established
- Succeeded by: Sanjay Kumar Singh

Personal details
- Born: 1990 (approx.) Raghopur, Vaishali, Bihar
- Party: Bharatiya Janata Party (November 2025–present)
- Other political affiliations: Samajwadi Party (till 2015), Lok Janshakti Party (2015–2021), Lok Janshakti Party (Ram Vilas) (2021–Nov 2024), Independent (Nov 2024–Nov 2025)
- Spouse: Annu Priya
- Education: B. Tech in Electronics and Instrumentation Engineering, Dr. M.G.R. Educational And Research Institute, Chennai, Tamil Nadu
- Occupation: Politician, businessman, agriculturist

Rakesh Raushan (born 1990, approx.) is an Indian politician and businessman from Raghopur, Vaishali, Bihar. He currently member of the Bharatiya Janata Party and campaigned for their candidate Satish Kumar Yadav in the 2025 Bihar Legislative Assembly election against two-term incumbent Tejashwi Yadav of the Rashtriya Janata Dal.

== Early life and education ==
Rakesh Raushan was born in Raghopur, Vaishali, Bihar. He completed his Bachelor of Technology in Electronics and Instrumentation Engineering from Dr. M.G.R. Educational and Research Institute, Chennai, Tamil Nadu.

== Political career ==
Rakesh Raushan began his political career with the Samajwadi Party contesting the 2015 Bihar Legislative Assembly election from Raghopur, where he received 5,220 votes and came third.

In the 2020 Bihar Legislative Assembly election, he contested on a Lok Janshakti Party ticket from the same constituency, securing 24,947 votes and finishing third again.

He was appointed as the State Vice-President of Lok Janshakti Party (Ram Vilas) in Bihar from October 2021 to November 2024.

In November 2024, he resigned from LJP (Ram Vilas) and became an independent candidate for the Tirhut Graduates Sub-Election 2024 but lost.

He joined the Bharatiya Janata Party in November 2025 and campaigned for their candidate Satish Kumar Yadav against Tejashwi Yadav in the 2025 Bihar Legislative Assembly elections.

== Family and personal life ==
Rakesh Raushan is the son of Brijnath Singh, a prominent LJP leader and politician from Raghopur. His spouse is Annu Priya.

=== Electoral Performance ===
| Year | Constituency | Party | Votes | Result | Position |
|---|---|---|---|---|---|
| 2015 | Raghopur | Samajwadi Party | 5,220 | Lost | 3rd |
| 2020 | Raghopur | Lok Janshakti Party | 24,947 | Lost | 3rd |
| 2024 | Tirhut Graduates Constituency (MLC) | Independent | 7,576 | Lost | 5th |
