= List of leaders of the opposition in the Bihar Legislative Assembly =

Leader of the Opposition of Bihar Legislative Assembly
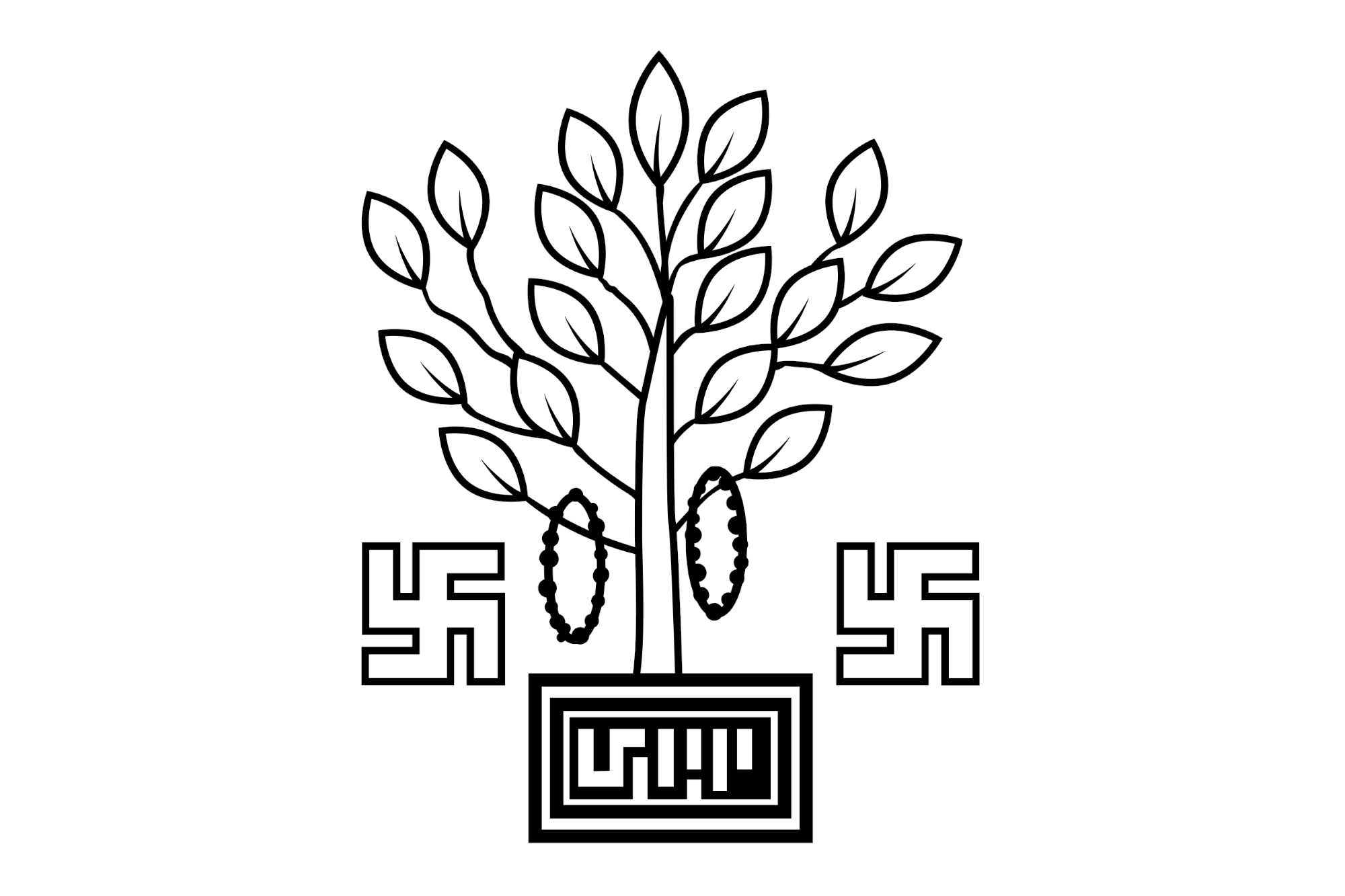
- Seal of Bihar Government

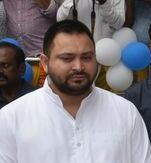
- Incumbent; Tejashwi Yadav since 16 February 2024
- Member of: Bihar Legislative Assembly
- Seat: Raghopur
- Nominator: Members of Official Opposition
- Appointer: Speaker of Bihar assembly
- Term length: 5 years No renewable limit

The leader of the opposition is the politician who leads the official opposition in the Bihar Legislative Assembly. The incumbent leader of opposition is Tejashwi Yadav.

== Leaders of the opposition ==
No	Portrait	Name	Constituency	Term of office			Assembly (election)	Party
1		Basawon Singh	Dehri	1952	1957	4 years, 299 days	1st (1952 election)	Socialist Party
2		Sushil Kumar Bage	Kolebira	20 May 1957	15 March 1962	4 years, 299 days	2nd (1957 election)	Jharkhand Party
3		Kamakhya Narain Singh	Barhi	16 March 1962	16 March 1967	5 years, 0 days	3rd (1962 election)	Swatantra Party
4		Mahesh Prasad Singh		17 March 1967	26 February 1969	1 year, 346 days	4th (1967 election)	Indian National Congress
5		Bhola Paswan Shastri	Korha	18 March 1969	15 March 1970	362 days	5th (1969 election)	Lok Tantrik Congress
6		Ramanand Tiwary	Shahpur	16 March 1970	15 March 1971	364 days	5th (1969 election)	Samyukta Socialist Party
7		Daroga Prasad Rai	Parsa	16 March 1971	28 March 1972	1 year, 12 days	5th (1969 election)	Indian National Congress
8		Karpoori Thakur	Tajpur				6th (1972 election)	Samyukta Socialist Party
9		Sunil Mukherjee	Patna West				6th (1972 election)	Communist Party of India
10		Ram Lakhan Singh Yadav	Danapur				7th (1977 election)	Indian National Congress
11		Jagannath Mishra	Jhanjharpur				7th (1977 election)	Indian National Congress
(7)		Karpoori Thakur	Samastipur	30 June 1980	12 February 1988	7 years, 227 days	8th (1980 election)	Janata Party (Secular)
(7)		Karpoori Thakur	Sonbarsha	30 June 1980	12 February 1988	7 years, 227 days	9th (1985 election)	Lokdal
12		Lalu Prasad Yadav	Sonpur	18 March 1989	7 December 1989	264 days	9th (1985 election)	Lokdal
13		Anup Lal Yadav	Triveniganj	18 January 1990	19 March 1990	60 days	9th (1985 election)	Lokdal
(11)		Jagannath Mishra	Jhanjharpur	20 March 1990	14 April 1994	4 years, 25 days	10th (1990 election)	Indian National Congress
14	Portrait of Ramashray Prasad Singh	Ramashray Prasad Singh	Konch	29 June 1994	15 March 1995	259 days	10th (1990 election)	Indian National Congress
15		Yashwant Sinha	Ranchi	17 April 1995	24 January 1996	282 days	11th (1995 election)	Bharatiya Janata Party
16		Sushil Kumar Modi	Patna Central	19 March 1996	1 March 2000	8 years, 9 days	11th (1995 election)	Bharatiya Janata Party
16		Sushil Kumar Modi	Patna Central	15 March 2000	28 March 2004	8 years, 9 days	12th (2000 election)	Bharatiya Janata Party
17		Upendra Kushwaha	Jandaha	29 March 2004	5 March 2005	341 days	12th (2000 election)	Janata Dal (United)
18		Rabri Devi	Raghopur	30 November 2005	24 November 2010	4 years, 359 days	14th (2005 election)	Rashtriya Janata Dal
19		Abdul Bari Siddiqui	Alinagar	6 December 2010	19 June 2013	2 years, 195 days	15th (2010 election)	Rashtriya Janata Dal
19		Nand Kishore Yadav	Patna Sahib	19 June 2013	4 December 2015	2 years, 168 days	15th (2010 election)	Bharatiya Janata Party
21		Prem Kumar	Gaya Town	4 December 2015	28 July 2017	1 year, 236 days	16th (2015 election)	Bharatiya Janata Party
22		Tejashwi Yadav	Raghopur	28 July 2017	9 August 2022	5 years, 12 days	16th (2015 election)	Rashtriya Janata Dal
22		Tejashwi Yadav	Raghopur	28 July 2017	9 August 2022	5 years, 12 days	17th (2020 election)	Rashtriya Janata Dal
23		Vijay Kumar Sinha	Lakhisarai	24 August 2022	28 January 2024	1 year, 157 days	17th (2020 election)	Bharatiya Janata Party
(22)		Tejashwi Yadav	Raghopur	16 February 2024	incumbent	2 years, 270 days	17th (2020 election)	Rashtriya Janata Dal
(22)		Tejashwi Yadav	Raghopur	16 February 2024	incumbent	2 years, 270 days	18th (2025 election)	Rashtriya Janata Dal

== See also ==
List of leaders of the opposition in the Bihar Legislative Council
