= Uday Narayan =

Uday Narayan may refer to:

- Uday Narayan Choudhary, Indian politician
- Uday Narayan Rai, Indian politician
