= Janshakti Janata Dal =

Indian political party founded in 2025

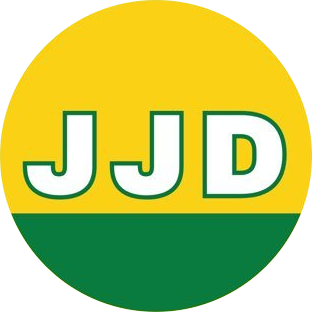
- Abbreviation: JJD
- Leader: Tej Pratap Yadav
- Spokesperson: Dr. Prem Yadav
- Founder: Tej Pratap Yadav
- Founded: 26 September 2025; 12 months ago
- Split from: Rashtriya Janata Dal
- Headquarters: Patna, Bihar – 800001
- Colours: Yellow and Green
- Slogan: Social Justice; Social Rights; Total Change
- ECI status: RUPP
- Seats in Rajya Sabha: 0 / 245
- Seats in Lok Sabha: 0 / 543
- Seats in Bihar Legislative Assembly: 0 / 243
- Seats in Bihar Legislative Council: 0 / 75

Election symbol
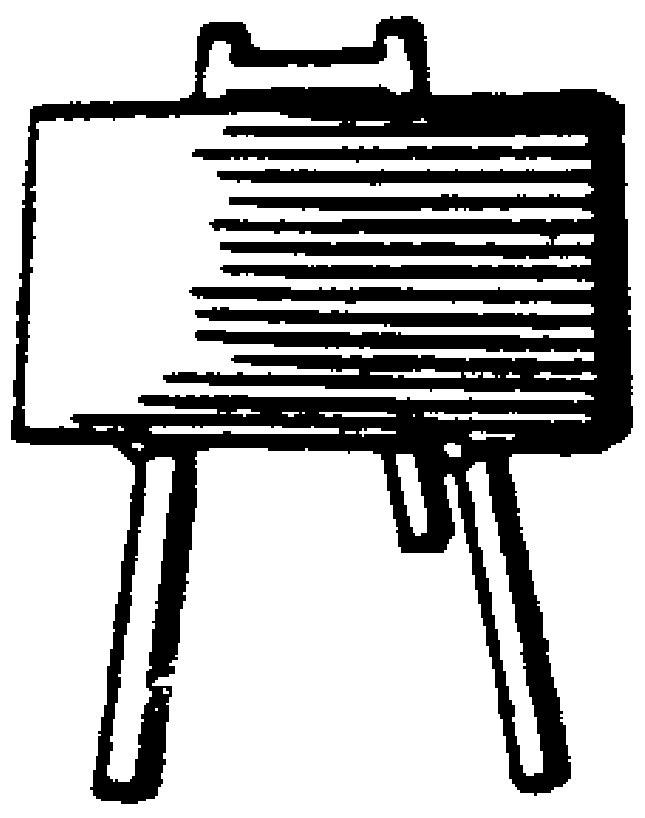

Website
- https://janshaktijanatadal.org/

Janshakti Janata Dal ("People's Power Party"), abbreviated as JJD, is an Indian political party founded by Tej Pratap Yadav, the son of Lalu Prasad Yadav and Rabri Devi, on 26 September 2025, following his expulsion from the Rashtriya Janata Dal. After the conclusion of the 2025 Bihar Legislative Assembly election, party president Tej Pratap Yadav announced that the Janshakti Janata Dal would extend support to the NDA government.

Yadav had, on 18 August 2025, floated the new political party, which had been led by Balendra Das as President since its formation before the 2024 Indian general election. Dainik Jagran reported that the party has been registered since 2020.

== Office holders ==
| S.No. | Portrait | Name | Term in office | | |
| S.No. | Portrait | Name | Assumed office | Left office | Time in office |
|---|---|---|---|---|---|
| 1 | | Tej Pratap Yadav; President Janshakti Janta Dal | 26 September 2025 | Incumbent | 1 year, 23 days |
| 2 | | Dr. Prem Yadav; Spokesperson Janshakti Janta Dal | 26 September 2025 | Incumbent | 1 year, 23 days |

== Electoral Performance ==
The party's first list of candidates for the 2025 Bihar Legislative Assembly election had a total of 21 candidates. Yadav himself announced his candidacy from Mahua constituency in Vaishali district, Bihar. The party failed to win any seat.

=== Bihar Assembly Elections ===
| Year | Vidhan sabha | Party leader | Seats contested | Seats won / Seats Contested | Overall vote | Overall vote % | Vote swing | Ref. |
|---|---|---|---|---|---|---|---|---|
| 2025 | 17th Assembly | Tej Pratap Yadav | 45 | 0 / 45 | 135514 | 0.27% | New entry | |

== Candidate list along with Results for Bihar Assembly Elections 2025 ==
| AC No. | AC Name | Candidate name | Gender | Age | Total Votes | Vote % |
|---|---|---|---|---|---|---|
| 11 | Sugauli | Shyam Kishor Chaudhary | Male | 35 | 40,684 | 20.47 |
| 126 | Mahua | Tej Pratap Yadav | Male | 36 | 35,703 | 16.89 |
| 191 | Bikram | Ajeet Kumar | Male | 41 | 4,937 | 2.29 |
| 14 | Govindganj | Ashutosh Kumar | Male | 30 | 3,471 | 1.90 |
| 15 | Kesaria | Vinod Kumar | Male | 36 | 3,313 | 1.88 |
| 20 | Chiraia | Mukesh Kumar | Male | 35 | 2,920 | 1.47 |
| 187 | Maner | Shankar Kumar | Male | 49 | 3,290 | 1.45 |
| 235 | Rajauli (SC) | Prakash Vir | Male | 59 | 2,856 | 1.42 |
| 30 | Belsand | Vikash Kumar | Male | 35 | 2,284 | 1.25 |
| 34 | Babubarhi | Shanti Devi | Female | 64 | 2,556 | 1.24 |
| 31 | Harlakhi | Jitender Yadav | Male | 34 | 1,907 | 1.04 |
| 102 | Kuchaikote | Braj Bihari Bhatt | Male | 57 | 2,025 | 1.00 |
| 84 | Hayaghat | Jagnnath Singh | Male | 64 | 1,465 | 0.87 |
| 195 | Agiaon (SC) | Barun Deo | Male | 54 | 1,326 | 0.86 |
| 137 | Mohiuddinnagar | Ajay Kumar Bulganin | Male | 62 | 1,498 | 0.82 |
| 138 | Bibhutipur | Neel Kamal | Male | 26 | 1,518 | 0.77 |
| 29 | Runnisaidpur | Pramod Kumar | Male | 49 | 1,231 | 0.64 |
| 234 | Wazirganj | Prem Kumar | Male | 35 | 1,316 | 0.63 |
| 122 | Sonepur | Surendra Prasad Yadav | Male | 57 | 1,235 | 0.62 |
| 18 | Madhuban | Shivshankar Ray | Male | 56 | 1,101 | 0.60 |
| 115 | Baniapur | Pushpa Kumari | Female | 30 | 1,135 | 0.57 |
| 108 | Raghunathpur | Pashupati Nath Chaturvedi | Male | 71 | 996 | 0.55 |
| 88 | Gaighat | Umesh Prasad Singh | Male | 63 | 1,226 | 0.55 |
| 73 | Madhepura | Sanjay Yadav | Male | 45 | 1,278 | 0.53 |
| 233 | Atri | Avinash Kumar Sonu | Male | 33 | 1,026 | 0.52 |
| 143 | Teghra | Chandra Prakash Singh | Male | 56 | 1,059 | 0.50 |
| 214 | Arwal | Arun Kumar | Male | 30 | 804 | 0.47 |
| 32 | Benipatti | Abadh Kishor Jha | Male | 48 | 811 | 0.46 |
| 201 | Dumraon | Dinesh Singh | Male | 41 | 829 | 0.42 |
| 129 | Mahnar | Jai Singh | Male | 38 | 849 | 0.42 |
| 180 | Bakhtiarpur | Gulshan Kumar Yadav | Male | 30 | 791 | 0.40 |
| 6 | Nautan | Ajeet Kumar Sah | Male | 28 | 782 | 0.38 |
| 116 | Taraiya | Vivek Kumar | Male | 29 | 681 | 0.35 |
| 35 | Bisfi | Sonu Kumar | Male | 27 | 697 | 0.34 |
| 198 | Shahpur | Madan Yadav | Male | 50 | 589 | 0.33 |
| 54 | Kishanganj | Md Tariq Anwar | Male | 45 | 749 | 0.33 |
| 197 | Jagdishpur | Neeraj Roy | Male | 32 | 607 | 0.32 |
| 128 | Raghopur | Prem Kumar | Male | 36 | 709 | 0.30 |
| 130 | Patepur (SC) | Rina Kumari | Female | 36 | 559 | 0.27 |
| 184 | Patna Sahib | Minu Kumari | Female | 39 | 606 | 0.26 |
| 146 | Begusarai | Ramkrishna Mahto | Male | 31 | 519 | 0.23 |
| 93 | Kurhani | Md Gulam Masoom | Male | 38 | 524 | 0.23 |
| 164 | Tarapur | Sukhdev Yadav | Male | 79 | 387 | 0.18 |
| 196 | Tarari | Sikandar Kumar | Male | 43 | 327 | 0.17 |
| 77 | Mahishi | Devnarayan Yadav | Male | 45 | 338 | 0.17 |

NOTE:

- 1. Out of 45 candidates who contested the election, only 2 were able to retain their security deposits, having secured at least one-sixth (16.67%) of the total votes.
- 2. Following the rejection of the nomination of VIP candidate Shashi Bhushan Singh, the Mahagathbandhan extended its support to JJD candidate Shyam Kishore Chaudhary from the Sugauli constituency.
- 3. The symbol allotted to the party was the “blackboard.”
- 4. The total number of votes secured was 135,514, which constituted a 0.27% share of the total votes cast across the state.
