= Hajipur Lok Sabha constituency =

Lok Sabha Constituency in Bihar, India

Coordinates: 25.7°N 85.2°E

Hajipur BR-31
- Lok Sabha constituency

Constituency details
- Country: India
- Region: East India
- State: Bihar
- Assembly constituencies: Hajipur; Lalganj; Mahua; Raja Pakar; Raghopur; Mahnar
- Established: 1957
- Reservation: SC

Member of Parliament
- 18th Lok Sabha
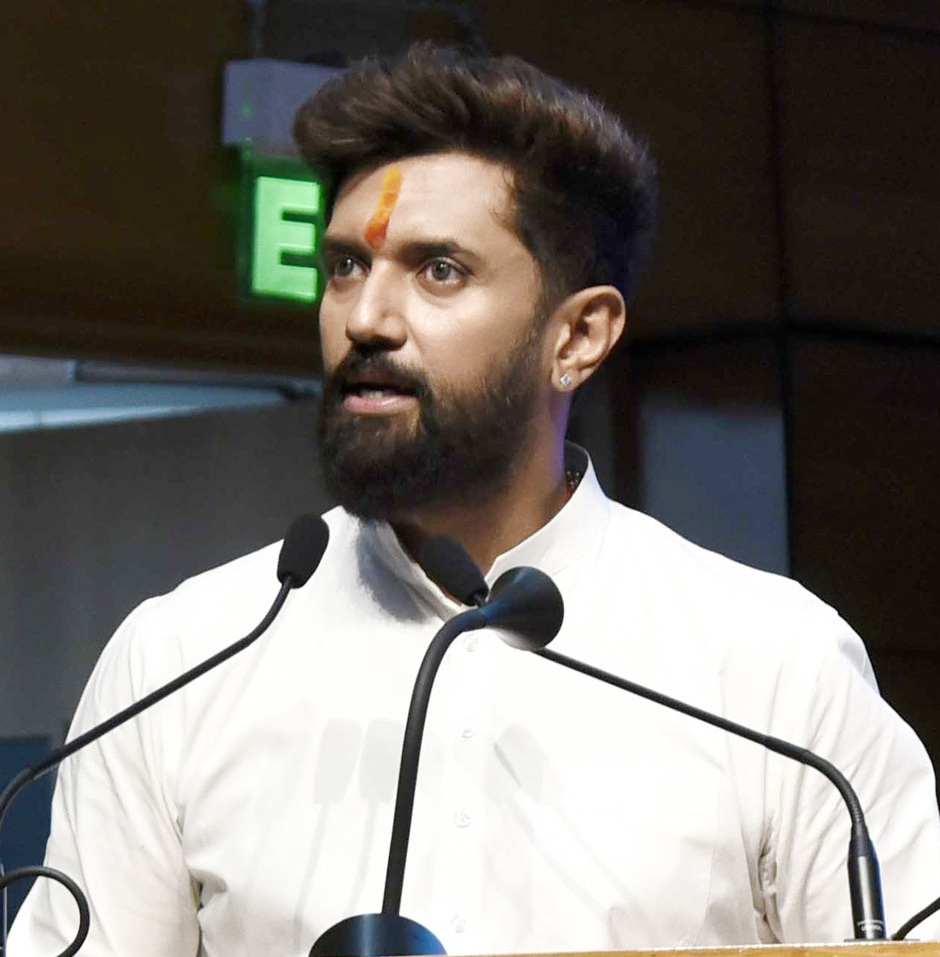
- Incumbent Chirag Ram Vilas Paswan; Union Minister of Food Processing Industries; S/O: Ram Vilas Paswan
- Party: LJP(RV)
- Alliance: NDA
- Preceded by: Pashupati Paras

Hajipur Lok Sabha constituency is one of the 40 Lok Sabha constituencies in Bihar in India.

Most successful parties from Hajipur Lok Sabha
1. INC (4 times) (24.0%)
2. INC(O) (1 time) (6.00%)
3. JP (1 time) (5.00%)
4. JP(S) (1 time) (6.00%)
5. JD (4 times) (24.0%)
6. JDU (2 times) (12.0%)
7. LJP (3 times) (17.0%)
8. LJP(RV) (1 time) (6.00%)

== Assembly Segments ==
Hajipur Lok Sabha constituency comprises the following six Vidhan Sabha (legislative assembly) segments:

#	Name	District	Member	Party	2024 lead
123	Hajipur	Vaishali	Awadhesh Singh	BJP	LJP(RV)
124	Lalganj	Vaishali	Sanjay Kumar Singh	BJP	LJP(RV)
126	Mahua	Vaishali	Sanjay Kumar Singh	LJP(RV)	LJP(RV)
127	Raja Pakar (SC)	Vaishali	Mahendra Ram	JD(U)	LJP(RV)
128	Raghopur	Vaishali	Tejashwi Yadav	RJD	RJD
129	Mahnar	Vaishali	Umesh Singh Kushwaha	JD(U)	LJP (RV)

== Members of Parliament ==
Year	Name	Party
1957	Rajeshwara Patel	Indian National Congress
1962	Rajeshwara Patel	Indian National Congress
1967	Valmiki Choudhary	Indian National Congress
1971	Digvijay Narain Singh	Indian National Congress (O)
1977	Ram Vilas Paswan	Janata Party
1980	Ram Vilas Paswan	Janata Party (Secular)
1984	Ram Ratan Ram	Indian National Congress
1989	Ram Vilas Paswan	Janata Dal
1991	Ram Sundar Das	Janata Dal
1996	Ram Vilas Paswan	Janata Dal
1998	Ram Vilas Paswan	Janata Dal
1999	Ram Vilas Paswan	Janata Dal (United)
2004	Ram Vilas Paswan	Lok Janshakti Party
2009	Ram Sundar Das	Janata Dal (United)
2014	Ram Vilas Paswan	Lok Janshakti Party
2019	Pashupati Kumar Paras	Lok Janshakti Party
2024	Chirag Paswan	Lok Janshakti Party (Ram Vilas)

== Election Results ==
Vote share of Winning candidates
2024	53.29%
2019	53.76%
2014	50.31%
2009	44.44%
2004	61.72%
1999	55.75%
1998	60.58%
1996	51.59%
1991	65.76%
1989	84.08%
1984	53.61%
1980	57.77%
1977	89.30%
1971	35.84%
1967	30.25%
1962	41.63%
1957	23.12%

=== 2024 ===
2024 Indian general elections: Hajipur
Party	Candidate	Votes	%	±%
LJP(RV)	Chirag Paswan	615,718	53.29	−0.42
RJD	Shiv Chandra Ram	445,613	38.57	+5.24
NOTA	None of the above	32,967	3.20	
Independent	Surendra Kumar Paswan	17,245	1.49	
Majority		170,105	14.72	
Turnout		1,155,605	58.57	
LJP(RV) gain from LJP		Swing		

=== 2019 ===
2019 Indian general elections: Hajipur
Party	Candidate	Votes	%	±%
LJP	Pashupati Kumar Paras	541,310	53.76	+3.45
RJD	Shiv Chandra Ram	335,861	33.36	+33.36
Independent	Raj Kumar Paswan	30,797	3.06	N/A
NOTA	None of the Above	25,256	2.51	+0.85
BSP	Umesh Das	14,579	1.45	+0.05
NCP	Dasai Chowdhary	4,875	0.48	+0.48
Majority		205,449		
Turnout		1,007,680	55.26	+0.41
LJP hold		Swing		

=== 2014 ===
2014 Indian general elections: Hajipur
Party	Candidate	Votes	%	±%
LJP	Ram Vilas Paswan	455,652	50.31	▲12.70
INC	Sanjeev Prasad Toni	230,152	25.41	▲21.52
JD(U)	Ram Sundar Das	95,790	10.58	▼33.86
Independent	Viphiya Devi	24,399	2.69	N/A
Independent	Dina Nath Ram	21,045	2.32	N/A
BSP	Dhaneshwar Ram	12,688	1.40	▲0.47
NOTA	None of the Above	15,047	1.66	N/A
Majority		225,500	24.90	▲18.07
Turnout		904,706	54.85	▲13.02
LJP gain from JD(U)		Swing		

=== 2009 ===
General Election, 2009: Hajipur
Party	Candidate	Votes	%	±%
JD(U)	Ram Sundar Das	246,715	44.44	
LJP	Ram Vilas Paswan	2,08,761	37.61	
INC	Dasai Choudhary	21,585	3.89	
LTSD	Dinesh Chandra Bhushan	17,150	3.09	
Independent	Sanjay Paswan	14,217	2.56	
Independent	Rajendra Kumar Paswan	13,071	2.35	
Independent	Ram Tirth Paswan	10,537	1.90	
Independent	Pratima Kumari	5,948	1.07	
BSP	Maheshwar Das	5,175	0.93	
Independent	Nand Lal Paswan	4,621	0.78	
Majority		37,954	6.83	
Turnout		5,55,107	41.83	
JD(U) gain from LJP		Swing		

=== 2004 ===
2004 Indian general election: Hajipur (SC)
Party	Candidate	Votes	%	±%
LJP	Ram Vilas Paswan	477,495	61.72	New entry
JD(U)	Chhedi Paswan	239,694	30.98	▼24.77
BSP	Chandeshwar Das	16,146	2.09	▲2.00
SJP(R)	Ram Sundar Das	14,801	1.91	▲1.27
Independent	Lalan Ram	8,322	1.08	Steady
JP	Jitendra Kumar	8,065	1.04	New entry
AD	Laxman Paswan	4,753	0.61	New entry
JD(S)	Uttam Choudhary Unnat	4,321	0.56	New entry
Majority		237,801	30.74	▲17.20
Turnout				
LJP gain from JD(U)		Swing		

=== 1999 ===
1999 Indian general election: Hajipur (SC)
Party	Candidate	Votes	%	±%
JD(U)	Ram Vilas Paswan	434,609	55.75	New entry
RJD	Ramai Ram	329,105	42.21	New entry
SJP(R)	Ram Sundar Das	5,027	0.64	▼37.82
Independent	Vinod Paswan	3,795	0.49	Steady
SPSP	Rampati Ram	3,260	0.42	New entry
Independent	Narayan Das	2,119	0.27	Steady
Independent	Ram Ekban Paswar	1,686	0.22	Steady
Majority		105,504	13.54	▼8.58
Turnout		790,448	74.27	▼0.92
JD(U) gain from JD		Swing		

=== 1998 ===
1998 Indian general election: Hajipur (SC)
Party	Candidate	Votes	%	±%
JD	Ram Vilas Paswan	486,350	60.58	▲8.99
SJP(R)	Ram Sunder Das	308,789	38.46	New entry
Independent	Geeta Devi	3,690	0.46	Steady
Independent	Narayan Das	2,863	0.36	Steady
Independent	Ramjeet Prasad	620	0.08	Steady
Independent	Veer Chandra Ram	542	0.07	Steady
Majority		177,561	22.12	▲15.97
Turnout		802,854	75.19	▲3.39
JD hold		Swing		

=== 1996 ===
1996 Indian general election: Hajipur (SC)
Party	Candidate	Votes	%	±%
JD	Ram Vilas Paswan	387,781	51.59	▼14.17
SAP	Ram Sundar Das	341,550	45.44	New entry
Independent	Raj Kumar Paswan	7,153	0.95	Steady
INC	Taneshwar Azad	4,166	0.55	▼13.28
BSP	Lakshmi Paswan	659	0.09	New entry
Independent	9 Independent Candidates	10,342	1.38	Steady
Majority		46,231	6.15	▼43.29
Turnout		759,759	71.80	▼4.68
JD hold		Swing		

=== 1991 ===
1991 Indian general election: Hajipur (SC)
Party	Candidate	Votes	%	±%
JD	Ram Sunder Das	489,105	65.76	▼18.32
JP	Dasai Choudhary	121,353	16.32	New entry
INC	Sanjiv Prasad Toni	102,831	13.83	▼1.30
BJP	Rajender Ram	28,312	3.81	New entry
DDP	Nathu Baitha	324	0.04	▼0.19
Independent	9 Independent Candidates	1,872	0.23	Steady
Majority		367,752	49.44	▼19.51
Turnout		749,558	76.48	▲1.14
JD hold		Swing		

=== 1989 ===
1989 Indian general election: Hajipur (SC)
Party	Candidate	Votes	%	±%
JD	Ram Vilas Paswan	615,129	84.08	New entry
INC	Mahabir Paswan	110,681	15.13	▼38.48
LKD(B)	Nagina Ram	2,238	0.31	New entry
PVP	Mahendra Bagat	1,833	0.25	New entry
DDP	Dashrath Paswan	1,711	0.23	New entry
Majority		504,448	68.95	▲60.23
Turnout		736,399	75.34	▲4.15
JD gain from INC		Swing		

=== 1984 ===
1984 Indian general election: Hajipur (SC)
Party	Candidate	Votes	%	±%
INC	Ram Ratan Ram	314,725	53.61	New entry
LKD	Ram Vilas Paswan	263,509	44.89	New entry
Independent	Rama Sankar Bharati	4,457	0.76	Steady
Independent	Suresh Ram	3,067	0.52	Steady
Independent	Kameshwar Bhagat	1,275	0.22	Steady
Majority		51,216	8.72	▼22.90
Turnout		593,853	71.19	▲10.09
INC gain from JP(S)		Swing		

=== 1980 ===
1980 Indian general election: Hajipur (SC)
Party	Candidate	Votes	%	±%
JP(S)	Ram Vilas Paswan	266,428	57.77	New entry
JP	Medni Paswan	120,589	26.15	▼63.15
INC(I)	Shyama Kumari	70,295	15.24	New entry
Independent	Kamta Prasad	2,162	0.47	Steady
Independent	Rajendra Bhagat	1,739	0.38	Steady
Majority		145,839	31.62	▼49.21
Turnout		465,147	61.10	▼15.97
JP(S) gain from JP		Swing		

=== 1977 ===
1977 Indian general election: Hajipur (SC)
Party	Candidate	Votes	%	±%
JP	Ram Vilas Paswan	469,007	89.30	New entry
INC	Baleshwar Ram	44,462	8.47	▼25.59
Independent	Ram Das Rajak	5,308	1.01	Steady
Independent	Ram Sundar Das	3,449	0.66	Steady
Independent	Lal Mohar Paswan	1,349	0.26	Steady
Independent	Vachchu Lal Azad	835	0.16	Steady
Independent	Annu Das	496	0.09	Steady
Independent	Suryadev Chaudhary	273	0.05	Steady
Majority		424,545	80.83	▲79.05
Turnout		529,440	77.07	▲12.56
JP gain from INC(O)		Swing		

=== 1971 ===
1971 Indian general election: Hajipur
Party	Candidate	Votes	%	±%
INC(O)	Digvijay Narain Singh	142,771	35.84	New entry
INC	Valmiki Chaudhary	135,687	34.06	▲3.81
SSP	Awadh Bihari Singh	67,472	16.94	▼4.74
PSP	Kamalesh Rai	37,670	9.46	▲5.30
RRP	Shrivedantijee	7,643	1.92	New entry
Independent	Ramnarain Singh	3,663	0.92	Steady
BKD	Shiv Shankar Rai	2,558	0.64	New entry
Independent	Bachulal Azad	907	0.23	Steady
Majority		7,084	1.78	▼6.79
Turnout		401,687	64.51	▲3.78
INC(O) gain from INC		Swing		

=== 1967 ===
1967 Indian general election: Hajipur
Party	Candidate	Votes	%	±%
INC	V. Chaudhary	100,645	30.25	▼11.38
SSP	S. Rai	72,115	21.68	New entry
Independent	S. Sharwan	57,076	17.16	Steady
JKD	R. Patel	35,246	10.59	New entry
ABJS	A. K. Verma	32,970	9.91	New entry
PSP	S. R. Yadav	13,830	4.16	▼6.02
Independent	B. N. Chaudhary	12,560	3.78	Steady
Independent	S. Devi	8,226	2.47	Steady
Majority		28,530	8.57	▼0.14
Turnout		346,087	60.73	▼0.92
INC hold		Swing		

=== 1962 ===
1962 Indian general election: Hajipur
Party	Candidate	Votes	%	±%
INC	Rajeshwar Patel	104,351	41.63	▲18.51
Socialist	Achhaibat Rai	82,501	32.92	New entry
SWA	Praduman Pd. Singh	38,263	15.27	New entry
PSP	Samser Bahadoor Singh	25,522	10.18	▼15.62
Majority		21,850	8.71	▲3.78
Turnout		259,738	61.65	▲16.62
INC hold		Swing		

=== 1957 ===
1957 Indian general election: Hajipur
Party	Candidate	Votes	%	±%
INC	Rajeshwar Patel	163,476	23.12	New entry
INC	Chandramani Lal Chaudhary	135,135	19.11	New entry
PSP	Ram Sundar Dass	100,257	14.18	New entry
CNSPJP	Ram Balak Roy	89,870	12.71	New entry
PSP	Yogendra Sukla	82,190	11.62	New entry
Independent	Awadhesh Narain Sinha	73,131	10.34	Steady
Independent	Kali Bhagat	62,980	8.91	Steady
Majority		34,878	4.93	New entry
Turnout		707,039	45.03	New entry
INC win (new seat)				

== See also ==
- Vaishali district
- List of constituencies of the Lok Sabha
