= Rajauli Assembly constituency =

Assembly constituency in Bihar, India

Coordinates: 24.65°N 85.51°E

- Constituency No. - for the Bihar Legislative Assembly

Constituency details
- Country: India
- Region: East India
- State: Bihar
- District: Nawada
- Established: 1951
- Total electors: 331,278

Member of Legislative Assembly
- 18th Bihar Legislative Assembly
- Incumbent Vimal Rajbanshi
- Party: LJP(RV)
- Alliance: NDA
- Elected year: 2025

Rajauli Assembly constituency is an assembly constituency for Bihar Legislative Assembly in Nawada district of Bihar, India. It comes under Nawada (Lok Sabha constituency). Prakash Veer of RJD had won the 2020 Bihar Legislative Assembly election from Rajauli. Before 2025 Bihar Legislative Assembly election Prakash Veer joined Janshakti Janata Dal led by Tej Pratap Yadav.

== Members of the Legislative Assembly ==
Year	Member	Party
1951	Radha Krishna Prasad Sinha	Indian National Congress
1957	Ramswaroop Prasad Yadav	Indian National Congress
1962	Ramswaroop Prasad Yadav	Indian National Congress
1967	Shanti Devi	Indian National Congress
1969	Babu Lal	Bharatiya Jana Sangh
1972	Banwari Ram	Indian National Congress
1977	Babu Lal	Independent
1980	Banwari Ram	Janata Party
1985	Banwari Ram	Independent
1990	Babu Lal	Bharatiya Janata Party
1995	Babu Lal	Janata Dal
2000	Rajaram Paswan	Rashtriya Janata Dal
2005	Nand Kishore Choudhary	Rashtriya Janata Dal
2005	Banwari Ram	Bharatiya Janata Party
2010	Kanhaiya Kumar	Bharatiya Janata Party
2015	Prakash Veer	Rashtriya Janata Dal
2020	Prakash Veer	Rashtriya Janata Dal
2020	Prakash Veer	Janshakti Janata Dal
2025	Vimal Rajbanshi	Lok Janshakti Party (Ram Vilas)

== Election results ==
=== 2025 ===
Bihar Legislative Assembly Election, 2025: Rajauli
Party	Candidate	Votes	%	±%
LJP(RV)	Vimal Rajbanshi	90,272	44.98	
RJD	Pinki Bharti	86,319	43.01	▲1.29
BSP	Akhilesh Kumar	3,832	1.91	
JSP	Naresh Chaudhari	3,321	1.65	
Janshakti Janta Dal	Prakash Vir	2,856	1.42	
RLJP	Pratima Kumari	2,262	1.13	
SBSP	Chandan Kumar	2,160	1.08	
Independent	Vijay Paswan	2,120	1.06	
NOTA	None of the above	4,286	2.14	▲1.43
Majority		3,953	1.97	▼5.53
Turnout		200,701	60.58	▲10.15
LJP(RV) gain from RJD		Swing	new	

=== 2020 ===
In the 2015 Bihar Legislative Assembly election in Rajauli, RJD won with 45.81% votes while BJP came in second with 42.81% votes, with a vote margin of 4615 votes.

2020 Bihar Legislative Assembly election: Rajauli
Party	Candidate	Votes	%	±%
RJD	Prakash Veer	69,984	41.72	−4.09
BJP	Kanhaiya Kumar	57,391	34.22	−8.59
Independent	Arjun Ram	14,394	8.58	
Independent	Prema Chaudhary	5,309	3.17	
Independent	Banwari Ram	3,506	2.09	
Independent	Prithaviraj Basant	2,296	1.37	
Independent	Ranjit Kumar	2,219	1.32	
Independent	Balmiki Ram	1,956	1.17	
RLSP	Mithilesh Rajvanshi	1,529	0.91	
NOTA	None of the above	1,188	0.71	−2.89
Majority		12,593	7.5	+4.5
Turnout		167,735	50.43	−0.42
RJD hold		Swing		

=== 2015 ===
2015 Bihar Legislative Assembly election: Rajauli
Party	Candidate	Votes	%	±%
RJD	Prakash Veer	70,549	45.81	
BJP	Arjun Ram	65,934	42.81	
CPI(ML)L	Vinay Paswan	2,987	1.94	
BSP	Rakesh Kumar	2,518	1.63	
RPI	Rajendra Paswan	1,409	0.91	
NOTA	None of the above	5,541	3.6	
Majority		4,615	3.0	
Turnout		154,019	50.85	
