= Shiv Chandra Ram =

Indian politician from Bihar

MLA, Bihar Legislative Assembly
- In office 2015–2020
- Preceded by: Sanjay Kumar
- Succeeded by: Pratima Kumari Das
- Constituency: Raja Pakar

Minister of Art, Culture & Youth Affairs
- In office 20 November 2015 – 26 July 2017
- Preceded by: Ranju Geeta
- Succeeded by: Krishna Kumar Rishi

MLA, Bihar Legislative Assembly
- In office February 2005 – 2010
- Preceded by: Dasai Chowdhary
- Succeeded by: Ravindra Ray
- Constituency: Mahua

Personal details
- Born: February 5, 1971 Mahua, Vaishali district, Bihar, India
- Party: Rashtriya Janata Dal
- Other political affiliations: None
- Spouse: Anita Adarsh
- Children: 1 son, 3 daughters
- Parent: Prabhu Ram (father)
- Education: Graduate
- Occupation: Politician, Animal Husbandry
- Known for: Senior RJD leader and Dalit representative

Shiv Chandra Ram (born 5 February 1971) is an Indian politician from the state of Bihar. He is a senior leader of the Rashtriya Janata Dal (RJD) and has served as a Member of the Legislative Assembly in the Bihar Legislative Assembly and as the Minister of Art, Culture & Youth Affairs in the Government of Bihar. He is regarded as a senior Dalit leader of the RJD and a close aide of Lalu Prasad Yadav and Tejashwi Yadav

He currently serves as the National President of Ravidas Chetna Manch and is a former National President of Yuva RJD.

== Early life and education ==
Shiv Chandra Ram was born on 5 February 1971 in Mahua, Vaishali district, Bihar to Prabhu Ram. He completed his graduation and later engaged in Animal husbandry as a profession before entering active politics.

== Political career ==
Shiv Chandra Ram began his political career with the Rashtriya Janata Dal. He was first elected as a Member of Bihar Legislative Assembly from the Mahua constituency in the February 2005 on an RJD ticket. He was re-elected from the same constituency in the October 2005 election, again representing the RJD.

In the 2015 Bihar Legislative Assembly election, Ram contested from the Raja Pakar seat as an RJD candidate and won, defeating Pratima Kumari Das of the Janata Dal (United). Following his victory, he was appointed as the *Minister of Art, Culture & Youth Affairs* in the Government of Bihar on 20 November 2015 and held the position until 26 July 2017. During his tenure, he succeeded Ranju Geeta and was succeeded by Krishna Kumar Rishi.

In the 2019 Indian general election, Ram contested from the Hajipur parliamentary constituency as an RJD candidate but lost to Pashupati Kumar Paras of the LJP by a margin of 2,05,449 votes.

He later contested the 2020 Bihar Legislative Assembly election from the Patepur seat but was defeated by Lakhendra Kumar Raushan of the Bharatiya Janata Party by 25,839 votes.

In the 2024 Indian general election, he again contested from Hajipur as an RJD candidate but lost to Chirag Paswan of the Lok Janshakti Party (Ram Vilas) by 1,70,105 votes.

Ram currently serves as the National President of Ravidas Chetna Manch and previously held the position of National President of Yuva RJD. He is regarded as a senior Dalit leader of the RJD and a close aide of Lalu Prasad Yadav and Tejashwi Yadav.

== Personal life ==
He is married to Anita Adarsh, who works as an Anganwadi Sevika. The couple has one son and three daughters.
