= Raja Pakar Assembly constituency =

Legislative constituency in Bihar, India

Coordinates: 25°42′34″N 85°21′02″E

Raja Pakar
- Constituency No. 127 for the Bihar Legislative Assembly

Constituency details
- Country: India
- Region: East India
- State: Bihar
- District: Vaishali
- Established: 2008
- Total electors: 281,602

Member of Legislative Assembly
- 18th Bihar Legislative Assembly
- Incumbent Mahendra Ram
- Party: JD(U)
- Alliance: NDA
- Elected year: 2025

Raja Pakar Assembly constituency is an assembly constituency in Vaishali district in the Indian state of Bihar. It is reserved for scheduled castes.

== Overview ==
As per Delimitation of Parliamentary and Assembly constituencies Order, 2008, No. 127 Raja Pakar Assembly constituency is composed of the following: Raja Pakar, Desri and Sahdei Buzurg community development blocks.

Raja Pakar Assembly constituency (SC) is part of No. 21 Hajipur (Lok Sabha constituency) (SC). Pratima Kumari Das is the current MLA from the constituency.

== Members of the Legislative Assembly ==
Year	Name	Party
Until 2008: Constituency did not exist
2010	Sanjay Kumar	Janata Dal (United)
2015	Shiv Chandra Ram	Rashtriya Janata Dal
2020	Pratima Kumari Das	Indian National Congress
2025	Mahendra Ram	Janata Dal (United)

== Election results ==
=== 2025 ===
Bihar Legislative Assembly Election, 2025: Raja Pakar
Party	Candidate	Votes	%	±%
JD(U)	Mahendra Ram	96,258	52.31	+17.82
INC	Pratima Kumari Das	48,069	26.12	−9.55
CPI	Mohit Paswan	12,990	7.06	
Independent	Ajay Kumar Paswan	5,748	3.12	
JSP	Mukesh Kumar	4,701	2.55	
Independent	Kavita Kumari	3,477	1.89	
ASP(KR)	Pankaj Kumar	2,989	1.62	
RLJP	Shivnath Kumar Paswan	1,983	1.08	
NOTA	None of the above	2,137	1.16	−1.42
Majority		48,189	26.19	+25.01
Turnout		184,018	65.35	+9.44
JD(U) gain from INC		Swing		

=== 2020 ===
In the 2010 state assembly elections, Sanjay Kumar of JD(U) won the newly created Raja Pakar assembly seat defeating his nearest rival Gaurishankar Paswan of LJP. In 2015 Shivchandr Ram of Rashtriya Janata Dal emerged victorious in the assembly elections from this reserved seat.

Bihar Assembly election, 2020: Raja Pakar
Party	Candidate	Votes	%	±%
INC	Pratima Kumari Das	54,299	35.67	
JD(U)	Mahendra Ram	52,503	34.49	
LJP	Dhananjay Kumar	24,689	16.22	−17.98
Independent	Manohar Kumar	3,867	2.54	
Independent	Prema Devi	2,589	1.7	
BSP	Pharesh Ram	2,482	1.63	+0.41
Independent	Bedami Devi	1,770	1.16	
JAP(L)	Ashok Kumar Mallik	1,518	1.0	
Independent	Amar Paswan	1,474	0.97	
NOTA	None of the above	3,928	2.58	+1.15
Majority		1,796	1.18	−10.07
Turnout		152,215	55.91	+0.71
INC gain from RJD		Swing		

=== 2015 ===
2015 Bihar Legislative Assembly election: Raja Pakar
Party	Candidate	Votes	%	±%
RJD	Shivchandra Ram	61,251	45.45	
LJP	Ram Nath Raman	46,096	34.2	
Independent	Pankaj Kumar	4,508	3.34	
Independent	Gaurishankar Paswan	4,406	3.27	
CPI(M)	Ram Shankar Ram Alias Ram Shankar Bharati	2,697	2.0	
Independent	Dasai Chaudhari	2,394	1.78	
Independent	Rajendra Ram	2,312	1.72	
BSP	Ramesh Das	1,651	1.22	
SP	Amod Kumar Paswan	1,288	0.96	
Independent	Gajendra Rajak	1,278	0.95	
NOTA	None of the above	1,925	1.43	
Majority		15,155	11.25	
Turnout		134,779	55.2	
