= Ram Sundar Das =

Indian politician (1921–2015)

15th Chief Minister of Bihar
- In office 21 April 1979 – 17 February 1980
- Preceded by: Karpuri Thakur
- Succeeded by: Jagannath Mishra

Member of Parliament, Lok Sabha
- In office 16 May 2009 – 16 May 2014
- Preceded by: Ram Vilas Paswan
- Succeeded by: Ram Vilas Paswan
- Constituency: Hajipur, Bihar
- In office 15 June 1991 – 10 May 1996
- Preceded by: Ram Vilas Paswan
- Succeeded by: Ram Vilas Paswan
- Constituency: Hajipur, Bihar

Member of the Bihar Legislative Assembly
- In office 1990–1991
- Preceded by: Baleshwar Paswan
- Succeeded by: L. Mahto
- Constituency: Patepur
- In office 1977–1980
- Preceded by: Ram Jaipal Singh Yadav
- Succeeded by: Lalu Prasad Yadav
- Constituency: Sonpur

Personal details
- Born: 9 January 1921 Gangajal, Bihar and Orissa Province, British India
- Died: 6 March 2015 (aged 94) Patna, Bihar, India
- Party: Janata Dal (United)
- Other political affiliations: Janata Dal, Janata Party
- Spouse: Savita Devi
- Children: 3
- Occupation: Politician

Ram Sundar Das (9 January 1921 – 6 March 2015) was an Indian freedom fighter, politician and former Chief Minister of Bihar state. He was a two-time Member of Parliament from Hajipur constituency.

== Early life and family ==
Das was born on 9 January 1921 in Gangajal near Sonpur, Saran District in Bihar. He matriculated from a school in Sonpur and attended Vidyasagar College in Calcutta. He dropped out of college to join the Indian freedom movement. He was married to Savita Devi in 1956 and had three children, two sons and one daughter.

== Political career ==
He played an active role in 1942 Quit India Movement. Das served as a functionary in Congress Socialist Party in his native place Sonpur. The Congress Socialist Party, through a series of mergers became a part of the Praja Socialist Party (PSP). Das served as member of PSP's Bihar Provincial Executive Council. In 1957 Lok Sabha elections, he was Socialists' losing candidate from Hajipur. Later he would win the seat twice. In 1968, he was elected as a Member of Bihar's legislative council and continued in this role until 1977.

In the 1977 Bihar Legislative Assembly election, that led to a decisive defeat of the ruling Indian National Congress at the hands of Janata party, Das was elected as the MLA for Sonpur. Janata Party was a recent amalgam of disparate groups including Indian National Congress (O), Bharatiya Lok Dal, Socialists and Jana Sangh.

In fight in the party broke over the question of Chief Minister, Karpoori Thakur's decision to implement the Mungeri Lal Commission report, that recommended the institution of reservations for Backward Castes in government jobs. Upper caste members of Janata Party tried to water down the reservation policy by unseating Thakur as Chief Minister. To wean away Dalit MLAs, Das, a Dalit himself, was nominated as the candidate. Though Das and Thakur were both Socialist, Das was considered more moderate and accommodative than the Chief Minister. Thakur resigned and Das became the Chief Minister of Bihar on 21 April 1979. The reservation law was weakened by allowing upper castes to obtain a greater percentage of government jobs. The internal tensions in Janata Party caused it to split into multiple factions which led to Congress returning to power in 1980.

In the late 1980s, some of the remnants of Janata Party had come together to form Janata Dal, which formed a coalition government at the national level following the 1989 Indian general election. In 1990 Bihar Legislative Assembly election, Janata Dal won the largest number of seats and sought to form government with the outside support of BJP and Communists. Das was a contender for Chief Ministership pitted against Raghunath Jha and Lalu Prasad Yadav. Yadav was supported by Devi Lal and Nitish Kumar, Jha by Chandra Shekhar and Das by Prime Minister, VP Singh.

Lalu Yadav had campaigned vastly in favour for implementing Mandal Commission, which sought to reserve government jobs for backward castes in Central government jobs. Das was less keen on this. VP Singh's support of Das was interpreted as a lack of enthusiasm for this form of social engineering. Nitish Kumar rallied backward caste MLAs towards Yadav. In the election, Yadav won narrowly over Das by a vote of 59 to 56. Jha won 12, mostly upper caste MLAs.

Ironically he joined Chandra Shekhar's Samajwadi Janata Party around 1995 though Chandra Shekhar had opposed his candidature for CM's post. Ram Sundar Das remained with that party until 2008, and in another twist joined Janata Dal (United) that time, though those people had also opposed his candidature for CM's post back in 1990. He died on 6 March 2015 at the age of 94.

=== Electoral record ===
- 1957 : lost from Hajipur (Lok Sabha constituency) in 1957 Indian general election, as Socialist Party (India) candidate
- 1968-1977 : Member of Bihar Legislative Council.
- 1977 : Lost Lok Sabha election from Hajipur as an independent, coming fourth and getting just 3,449 votes
- 1977 : Elected to Bihar Legislative Assembly from Sonpur (Vidhan Sabha constituency) (सोनपुर)
  - Served as Chief Minister of Bihar in 1979
- 1980 : Came third as Janata Party candidate in Sonpur, losing to Lalu Yadav of Janata Party (Secular)
- 1984 : Lost Lok Sabha election from Palamu seat as Janata Party candidate, then in Bihar and now in Jharkhand.
- 1985 : Lost Bihar Vidhan Sabha election from Garkha (SC) seat, as Janata Party's candidate
- 1990 : Elected to Bihar Vidhan Sabha from Patepur. Vacated the seat next year when elected to Lok Sabha.
- 1991 : Elected to Lok Sabha from Hajipur, as Janata Dal candidate
- 1996 : Lost Lok Sabha election from Hajipur as Samata Party (led by Uday Mandal its President) candidate, but he could be a different person with the same name. Das was probably never a part of Samata Party.
- 1998 : Lost from Hajipur as member of Samajwadi Janata Party (Rashtriya)
- 1999 : Lost from Hajipur as member of Samajwadi Janata Party (Rashtriya). Came third with just 5,027 votes.
- 2004 : One Ram Sundar Das lost Lok Sabha election from Hajipur as member of Samajwadi Janata Party (Rashtriya), but he might be another person with the same name because his age was just 67 as per the data. But the age could be a typo.
- 2009 : Elected to Lok Sabha from Hajipur, as Janata Dal (United) candidate. Defeated Ram Vilas Paswan.
- 2014 : Lost Lok Sabha Election from Hajipur (came third), as candidate for Nitish Kumar's Janata Dal (United)

Lok Sabha
Preceded by Ram Vilas Paswan	Member of Parliament for Hajipur; 1991–1996	Succeeded by Ram Vilas Paswan
Preceded by Ram Vilas Paswan	Member of Parliament for Hajipur; 2009–2014	Succeeded by Ram Vilas Paswan
Party political offices
Preceded by	Leader of the Janata Dal (United) Party in the 16th Lok Sabha; 2009-2014	Succeeded by Kaushalendra Kumar
Political offices
Preceded by Karpoori Thakur	Chief Minister of Bihar; 21 April 1979 – 17 February 1980	Succeeded by President's rule
