= Ram Ratan Ram =

Indian politician (1921–2002)

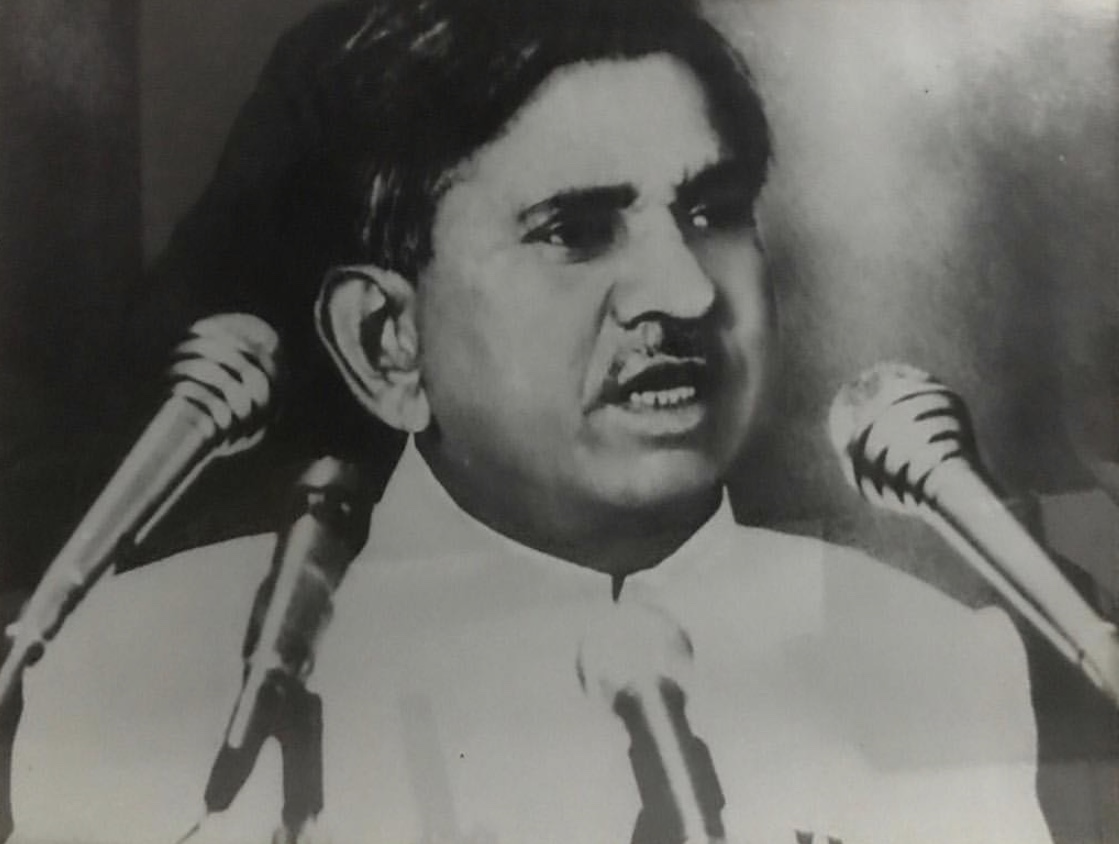
- Ram speaking at the Kremlin, Russia at 70th anniversary celebrations of the October Revolution in 1987

Member of Parliament, Lok Sabha
- In office 28 December 1984 – 28 November 1989
- Preceded by: Ram Vilas Paswan
- Succeeded by: Ram Vilas Paswan
- Constituency: Hajipur, Bihar

Member of Bihar Legislative Assembly
- In office 1980–1985
- Preceded by: Hira Ram Toofani
- Succeeded by: Hari Ram
- Constituency: Kanke
- In office 1972–1977
- Preceded by: Brindawan Swansi
- Succeeded by: Rajendra Singh
- Constituency: Silli

Personal details
- Born: 24 March 1921 Ranchi, Bihar, British India (now Jharkhand, India)
- Died: 20 August 2002 (aged 81) New Delhi
- Party: Indian National Congress

Ram Ratan Ram (1921–2002) was an Indian politician. He was a Member of Parliament and former General Secretary, Indian National Congress. He served as social worker and advocate, under the mentorship of Bose. He was elected to the Bihar Vidhan Sabha in 1952 and won every consecutive election till his move to the centre in 1984. Ram was elected to the Lok Sabha, the lower house of the Parliament of India from Hajipur in Bihar as a member of the Indian National Congress.

He was a prominent member of the Indian National Congress post independence. Mr. Ram Ratan Ram also served as the Chairman of the SC/ST Commission of India and was also one of the pioneers in the formation of the state of Jharkhand.

At a state level politician in Bihar, he held several portfolios during the years before his Lok Sabha term, most notably as Minister for Home Affairs in the Government of Bihar.

== Early and personal life ==
Sri Ram was B.A., LL.B., affiliated with [Congress (I)—Bihar, Hajipur (Res. Sch. Castes), 1984] s. of late Shri Laxman Ram; b. at Ranchi, 24 March 1921; early education at Nibaran Ashram started by Mahatma Gandhi, B. K. High School, Ranchi College, Doranda College, Chotanagpur Law College, Ranchi University, Bihar;

Married to Smt. Bina Devi, 29 April 1942; they had 8 sons and daughter.

He spent most of his time between New Delhi, Ranchi and Patna. On 16 August 2002 he was admitted to Escorts Heart Institute under Dr. Naresh Trehan due to a heart attack and died on 20 August 2002.

== Political career ==
In his early years, he was a part of the freedom movement as he went on to complete his education in law subsequently working as an advocate, political and social worker, participated in 1942 Movement.

He was Cabinet Minister, Government of Bihar, 1974–77; Member, (i) All India Congress Committee and (ii) Bihar Pradesh Congress Committee; President, Ranchi District Congress Committee; Secretary, (i) Backward Classes Federation, 1952–64, (ii) Depressed Classes League, Bihar, 1952–72; and (iii) Ranchi Nagar Charmodyog Sahakari Samiti Limited, 1955–80; chairman, (i) Jagannath Mandir Trust, 1975–85, (ii) Bihar State Leather Industries Development Corporation, 1984–85, (iii) Scheduled Castes Parishad, Bihar and (iv) East Bengal Refugees Association; present chairman, Shaheed Smarak Samiti, Ranchi; General Secretary, D.C.L., Bihar; Member, (i) Railway Consultative Committee, South, Eastern Railway, 1953–62, (ii) Transport Authority, Ranchi, 1953–62, (iii) Bihar State Scheduled Castes Advisory Board, 1952–85 and (iv) Forest Advisory Board, Bihar, 1952–62 and had been member of several Development Committees of State Government in Ranchi District; Member, (i) Bihar Vidhan Sabha, 1952–62, 1972–77, 1980–84 and (ii) Bihar Vidhan Parishad, 1964–70.
