= Uday Narayan Rai =

Indian politician

Member of Bihar Legislative Assembly
- In office 1980–1995
- Preceded by: Babu Lal Shastri
- Succeeded by: Lalu Prasad Yadav
- Constituency: Raghopur

Personal details
- Born: 1932
- Died: 25 August 2022 (aged 89–90) AIIMS Patna, Patna, Bihar, India
- Party: Janata Dal (United) (2020–2022)
- Other political affiliations: Rashtriya Janata Dal (until 2020)
- Occupation: Politician
- Nickname(s): Bhola Babu, Bhola Rai

Uday Narayan Rai (1932 – 25 August 2022), also known as Bhola Babu and Bhola Rai, was an Indian politician from the state of Bihar. He was a member of the Bihar Legislative Assembly from Raghopur and served as a state cabinet minister in the governments of Lalu Prasad Yadav and Rabri Devi.

He was elected as the Member of the Legislative Assembly (MLA) three times in the Bihar Assembly elections of 1980, 1985, and 1990.

Uday Narayan Rai began his political career with the Rashtriya Janata Dal (RJD) and later joined the Janata Dal (United) (JDU). Uday Narayan Rai passed away on 25 August 2022 at AIIMS Patna, Bihar, at the age of 90. He was cremated with full state honors in Vaishali.

== Political career ==
Rai won the seat of Raghopur constituency for three consecutive terms in 1980, 1985 and 1990. He vacated the seat upon the directive of Lalu Prasad Yadav in 1995 so that Lalu Prasad Yadav could contest from the constituency in the 1995 election. He served as a cabinet minister in the governments of Lalu Prasad Yadav and Rabri Devi.

In 2020, he quit Rashtriya Janata Dal following not being nominated as a Member of Legislative Council, and announced that he would support National Democratic Alliance (NDA) against Tejashwi Yadav, the incumbent MLA of Raghopur. In September 2020, he joined Janata Dal (United).
