= Ramswaroop Prasad Yadav =

Indian politician

Member of the Bihar Legislative Assembly
- In office 1957–1967
- Preceded by: Radha Krishna Prasad Sinha
- Succeeded by: Shanti Devi
- Constituency: Rajauli

Personal details
- Born: Rajauli Nawada district, Bihar
- Party: Indian National Congress
- Occupation: Politician social work

Ramswaroop Prasad Yadav was an Indian politician who was elected as a member of Bihar Legislative Assembly from Rajauli constituency in 1957 and 1962 as the candidate of Indian National Congress.

== See also ==
- Rajauli Assembly constituency
- 1957 Bihar Legislative Assembly election
- 1962 Bihar Legislative Assembly election
