= Hari Sahni =

Indian politician

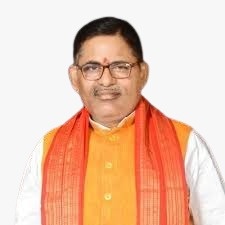

Minister of BC & EBC Welfare Government of Bihar
- In office 15 March 2024 – 20 November 2025
- Chief Minister: Nitish Kumar
- Preceded by: Prem Kumar
- Succeeded by: Rama Nishad

Leader of the Opposition Bihar Legislative Council
- In office 20 August 2023 – 14 February 2024
- Chief Minister: Nitish Kumar
- Preceded by: Samrat Choudhary
- Succeeded by: Rabri Devi

Member of Bihar Legislative Council
- Incumbent
- Assumed office 22 July 2022
- Preceded by: Arjun Sahani
- Constituency: elected by Members of Legislative Assembly

Personal details
- Born: 2 March 1964 (age 62) Bahadurpur, Bihar, India
- Party: Bharatiya Janata Party
- Spouse: Shanti Devi
- Parent: Baso Sahni (father)
- Education: Master of Commerce
- Alma mater: Lalit Narayan Mithila University
- Profession: Politician

Hari Sahni is an Indian politician and the former Minister of Backward Classes & Extremely Backward Classes Welfare in the Government of Bihar. He had also served as the leader of the opposition in the Bihar Legislative Council for 6 months from Aug-2023 to Feb-2024. He is a member of the Bharatiya Janata Party and a member of Bihar Legislative Council since 2022.

He had been the District President of BJP Darbhanga and had contested in 2015 Bihar Legislative Assembly election from Bahadurpur but had lost to Bhola Yadav of RJD by margin of 16,989 votes.
