= Pratima Kumari Das =

Indian politician

Member of Bihar Legislative Assembly
- In office 2020–2025
- Preceded by: Shiv Chandra Ram
- Succeeded by: Mahendra Ram
- Constituency: Raja Pakar

Personal details
- Born: 13 September 1975 (age 50)
- Party: INC

Pratima Kumari Das (born 13 September 1975) is an Indian politician from Bihar. She is a former MLA from Raja Pakar Assembly constituency, which is reserved for SC community in Vaishali district, representing Indian National Congress Party. She won the 2020 Bihar Legislative Assembly election but lost in the next election in 2025.

== Early life and education ==
Kumari is from Kumhrar, Bihar. She is born to Prabhu Narayan and Rajkumari Devi. She married Birendra Kumar. She is an advocate. She completed her B.Sc. from B.R.A.U. Gaya, Bihar and later, did her L.L.B. at Magadh University.

== Career ==
Kumari won the 2020 Bihar Legislative Assembly election from Raja Pakar Assembly constituency representing Indian National Congress Party. She polled 54,299 votes and defeated her nearest rival, Mahendra Ram of Janata Dal (United), by a margin of 1,796 votes. She lost to Ram in the 2025 Bihar Legislative Assembly election. Contesting again on Congress ticket she polled 48,069 and lost by 48,189 votes. Before the election, she felt that the grand old party should contest all the 243 seats.
