= Valmiki Choudhary =

Indian politician

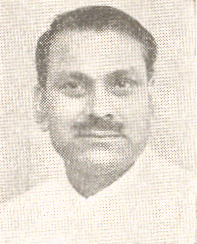

Member of Parliament, Lok Sabha
- In office 1967–1971
- Preceded by: Rajeshwara Patel
- Succeeded by: Digvijay Narain Singh
- Constituency: Hajipur, Bihar

Personal details
- Born: 26 July 1921 Jamalpur, Monghyr district, Bihar, British India
- Died: 28 March 1996 (aged 74)
- Party: Indian National Congress
- Spouse: Binda Rani Choudhary

Valmiki Choudhary (26 July 1921 – 28 March 1996) was an Indian politician. He was elected to the Lok Sabha, the lower house of the Parliament of India from the Hajipur in Bihar as a member of the Indian National Congress.

Choudhary died on 28 March 1996, at the age of 74. MPs paid tribute to him on 10 June.
