= Rajeshwara Patel =

Indian politician

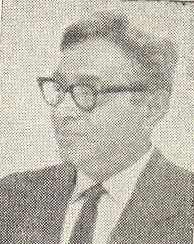

Member of Parliament, Lok Sabha
- In office 1952–1967
- Succeeded by: Valmiki Choudhary
- Constituency: Hajipur, Bihar

Personal details
- Born: 5 July 1911 Hajipur, Bihar, British India
- Party: Indian National Congress

Rajeshwara Patel (born 5 July 1911, date of death unknown) was an Indian politician. He was elected to the Lok Sabha, the lower house of the Parliament of India from the Hajipur in Bihar as a member of the Indian National Congress.
