= Ravindra Ray =

Indian politician

MLA, Bihar Legislative Assembly
- In office 2010–2015
- Preceded by: Shiv Chandra Ram
- Succeeded by: Tej Pratap Yadav
- Constituency: Mahua

Personal details
- Born: Hajipur, Bihar
- Party: Hindustani Awam Morcha; Janata Dal (United)
- Occupation: Politician social work

Ravindra Ray is an Indian politician who was elected as a member of Bihar Legislative Assembly from Mahua constituency in 2010 as a member of Janata Dal (United) but lost the 2015 election to Tej Pratap Yadav as a candidate of Hindustani Awam Morcha.

== See also ==
- Mahua Assembly constituency
