= Arjun Sahani =

Indian politician

Member of Bihar Legislative Council
- In office 22 July 2016 – 21 July 2022
- Preceded by: Kiran Ghai Sinha
- Succeeded by: Hari Sahni
- Constituency: elected by Legislative Assembly members

Personal details
- Party: Bharatiya Janata Party

Arjun Sahani is former member of Bihar Legislative Council. He is currently the Bharatiya Janata Party's state secretary. Sahani is a former member of the Extremely Backward Caste Commission and head of the Bihar Matsyajeevi Manch. He is a resident of Darbhanga.
