= Sushil Kumar Modi =

Indian politician (1952–2024)

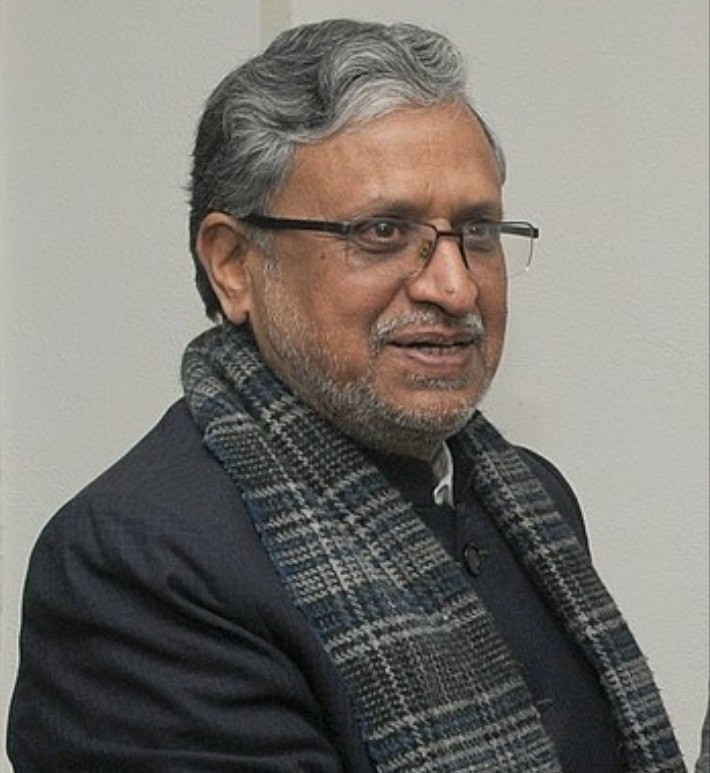
- Modi in 2015

Member of Parliament, Rajya Sabha
- In office 7 December 2020 – 2 April 2024
- Preceded by: Ram Vilas Paswan
- Succeeded by: Dharamshila Gupta
- Constituency: Bihar

Member of Parliament, Lok Sabha
- In office 2004–2005
- Preceded by: Subodh Ray
- Succeeded by: Syed Shahnawaz Hussain
- Constituency: Bhagalpur

4th Deputy Chief Minister of Bihar
- In office 27 July 2017 – 16 November 2020
- Chief Minister: Nitish Kumar
- Preceded by: Tejashwi Yadav
- Succeeded by: Tarkishore Prasad, Renu Devi
- In office 24 November 2005 – 16 June 2013
- Chief Minister: Nitish Kumar
- Preceded by: Ram Jaipal Singh Yadav
- Succeeded by: Tejashwi Yadav

Leader of the Opposition Bihar Legislative Assembly
- In office 19 March 1996 – 28 March 2004
- Chief Minister: Lalu Prasad Yadav; Rabri Devi
- Preceded by: Yashwant Sinha
- Succeeded by: Upendra Kushwaha

Leader of the Opposition Bihar Legislative Council
- In office 19 June 2013 – 27 July 2017
- Chief Minister: Nitish Kumar
- Preceded by: Ghulam Ghaus
- Succeeded by: Rabri Devi

Member of Bihar Legislative Assembly
- In office 1990–2004
- Preceded by: Aquil Haider
- Succeeded by: Arun Kumar Sinha
- Constituency: Patna Central

Member of Bihar Legislative Council
- In office 7 May 2006 – 11 December 2020
- Succeeded by: Shahnawaz Hussain
- Constituency: elected by the Members of Legislative Assembly

Personal details
- Born: 5 January 1952 Patna, Bihar, India
- Died: 13 May 2024 (aged 72) Patna, Bihar, India
- Party: Bharatiya Janata Party
- Spouse: Jessie George (m. 1986)
- Children: 2
- Education: Patna University
- Website: www.sushilmodi.in

Sushil Kumar Modi (5 January 1952 – 13 May 2024) was an Indian politician from the Bharatiya Janata Party who was a Member of Parliament in the Rajya Sabha from Bihar. He was a Deputy Chief Minister of Bihar as well as the Finance Minister of Bihar from 2005 to 2013 and 2017 to 2020. He was a lifelong member of the Rashtriya Swayamsevak Sangh. He was appointed the chairman of the Empowered Committee of State Finance Ministers for the Implementation of Goods and Service Tax in July 2011. He was posthumously honored with the Padma Bhushan, India's third-highest civilian award, by the Government of India.

== Early life and education ==
Sushil Modi was born on 5 January 1952. He was born to Moti Lal Modi and Ratna Devi. He attended Patna Science College and graduated with a B.Sc. (Hons) Botany degree in 1973. He enrolled in the M.Sc. Botany Course at Patna University but left the course midway to join the social movement started by Jai Prakash Narayan.

Modi married Jessie George on 13 August 1986, a Christian Keralite hailing from Mumbai. Modi and Jessy were classmates during their research studies. During this time, they fell in love and decided to get married.

His wife was a college professor, with whom he had two sons, Utkarsh Tathagat and Akshay Amritanshu.

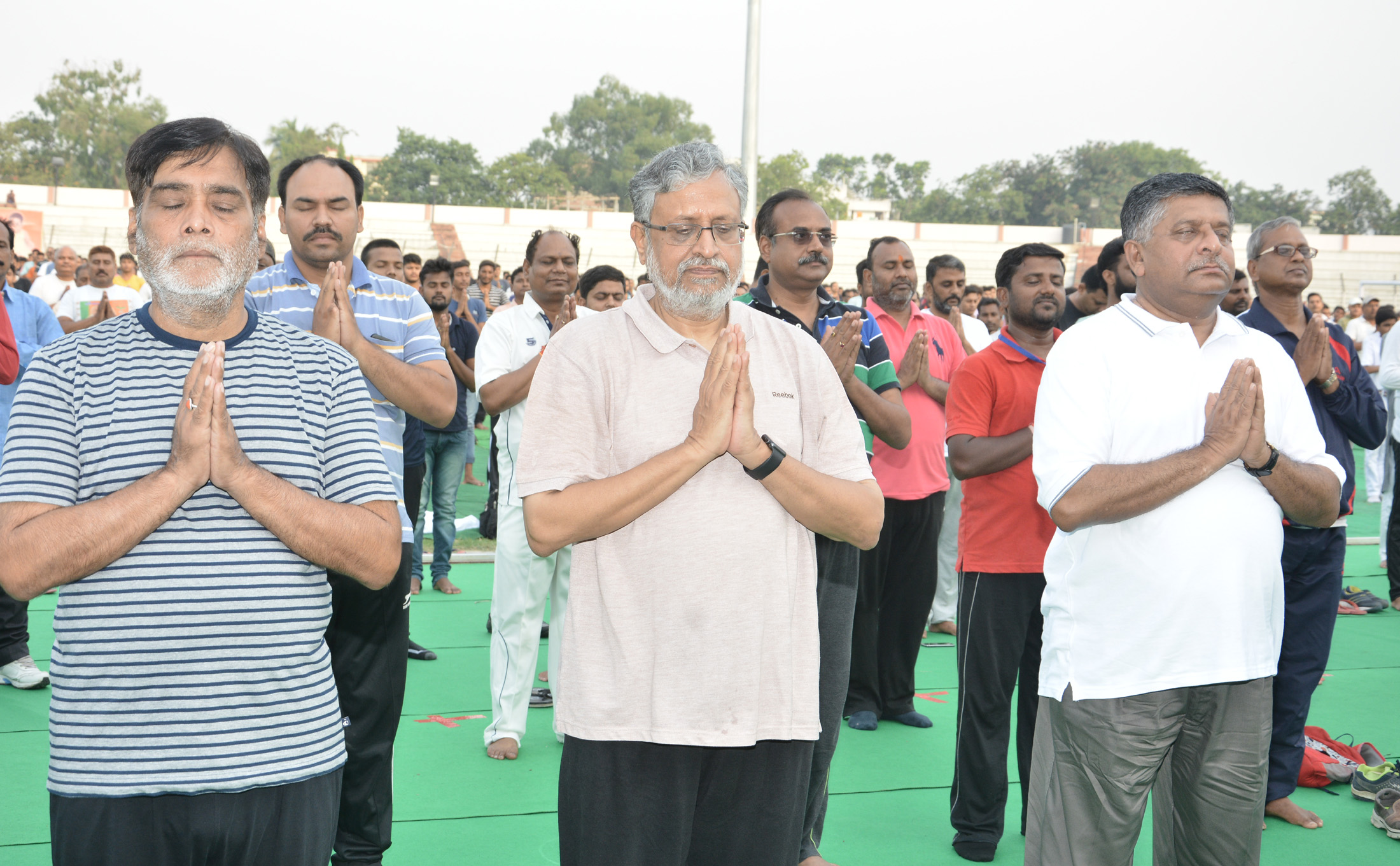
Sushil Modi performs Yoga, on the occasion of the 4th International Day of Yoga 2018 along with Union Minister Ravi Shankar Prasad and Ram Kripal Yadav

== Early political career ==
Sushil Modi's political career started as a student activist at Patna University. He became the General-Secretary of Patna University Students' Union in 1973, Lalu Prasad Yadav who later came to be his biggest political rival was the president of the union at the time. In 1974, he became a Member of Bihar Pradesh Chaatra (Student) Sangharsh Samiti which spearheaded the famous Bihar Student's Movement of 1974. Modi was arrested five times during JP Movement and the Emergency. He was arrested during the 1974 student movement in Bihar. He challenged the constitutional validity of MISA Act in the Supreme Court of India which resulted in section 9 of the MISA Act being struck down as unconstitutional. He was booked under the MISA and various other acts from 1973 to 1977. During The Emergency, he was arrested on 30 June 1975 and remained in Jail for 19 months continuously.

Modi was appointed the State Secretary of the Akhil Bharatiya Vidyarthi Parishad after the Emergency. From 1977 to 1986, he held various leadership positions in the ABVP. During his tenure at ABVP he led a movement against the declaration of Urdu as the second language of Bihar and Uttar Pradesh. Concerned about the issue of illegal migration from Bangladesh in the bordering districts of Bihar he raised the issue and after Assam Movement, a movement against illegal migration was launched in Bihar under his leadership.

== Political career ==
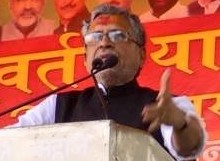
Sushil Modi addressing a rally in Nayagaon, Sonpur in 2015

In 1990, he joined active politics and successfully contested from Patna Central Assembly (now known as Kumhrar (Vidhan Sabha constituency)). He was re-elected in 1995 and 2000. In 1990, he was made the Chief Whip of the BJP Bihar Legislature Party. From 1996 until 2004 he was the Leader of Opposition in the State Assembly. He filed the Public Interest Litigation (PIL) in the Patna High Court against Lalu Prasad Yadav, which was later known as the Fodder Scam. He became a member of Lok Sabha in 2004 representing the constituency of Bhagalpur.

Modi was the Minister for Parliamentary Affairs in a short-lived Nitish Kumar government in 2000. He supported the formation of the State of Jharkhand.

In 2005 Bihar election, NDA came to power and Modi was elected the leader of Bihar BJP Legislature Party. He subsequently resigned from the Lok Sabha and took over as the Deputy Chief Minister of Bihar. He was given the Finance Portfolio along with a number of other departments. After NDA victory in 2010 Bihar elections, he continued to be the Deputy Chief Minister of Bihar. Modi did not contest the 2005 and 2010 Bihar Assembly elections to be able to campaign for BJP.

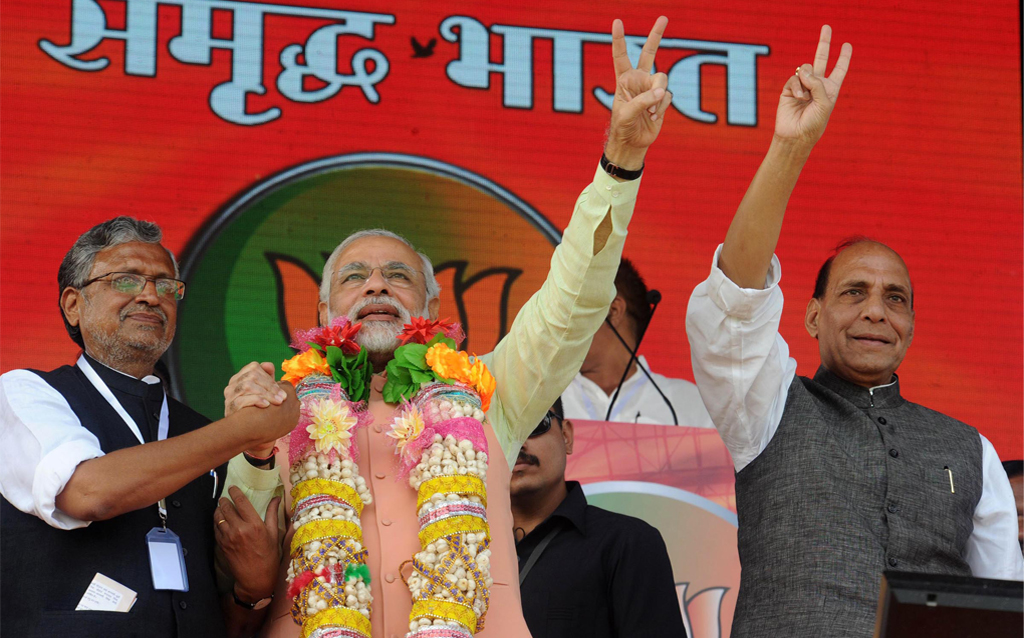
Sushil Modi with Narendra Modi and Rajnath Singh at Hunkar Rally

In 2017, Sushil Modi was the main player behind the fall of the JDU-RJD Grand Alliance government in Bihar, with his continuous tirade against RJD chief Lalu Prasad and his family for four months over his alleged benami properties and irregular financial transactions.

Sushil Kumar Modi was Nitish Kumar’s deputy Chief Minister for 11 years and the duo was often referred to as Ram-Laxman ki jodi in the political circles of Bihar.

On 8 December 2020, he was elected unopposed to the Rajya Sabha from Bihar to fill the vacant seat after Ram Vilas Paswan's death. He became one of the few Indian leaders to have been a member of both the Rajya Sabha and the Lok Sabha — both houses of the legislature.

=== Political views ===
Modi was opposed to efforts to legalize same-sex marriage in India, describing supporters as "left-liberals” who want to “imitate the West and impose such laws" on the Indian public. Modi argued that legalizing same-sex marriage in India would "cause complete havoc with the delicate balance of personal laws in the country".

== Illness and death ==
On 3 April 2024, Modi revealed that he had been diagnosed with cancer six months previously, and would not take part in the BJP’s Lok Sabha campaign for the 2024 general election. He died after a prolonged battle with cancer on 13 May 2024, at the age of 72. During the Lok Sabha elections, he had revealed his illness on social media. According to Narendra Modi "He has played an invaluable role in the rise and success of BJP in Bihar".

== Positions held ==
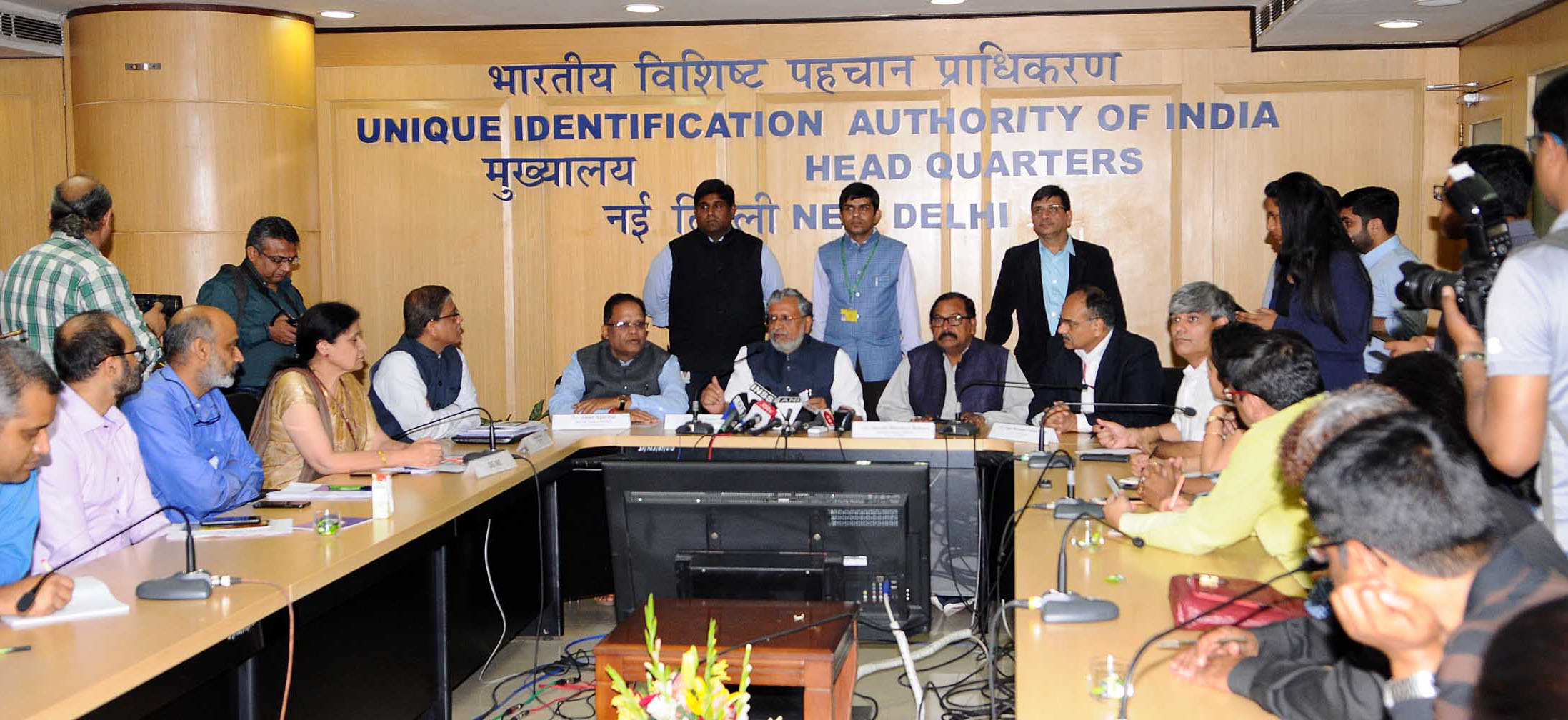
Deputy Chief Minister of Bihar & Convener of the GoM, Shri Sushil Kumar Modi addressing a press conference after the 7th Meeting of the Group of Ministers on IT (GoM on IT) for GST Implementation, in New Delhi

Period	Positions
1973–1977	General Secretary, Patna University Students Union
1983–1986	All India General Secretary, Akhil Bharatiya Vidyarthi Parishad
1995–1996	Secretary, Bharatiya Janata Party
1990–2004	Member of Bihar Legislative Assembly from Patna Central
1996–2004	Leader of Opposition in the Bihar Legislative Assembly
2000	Minister of Parliamentary Affairs
2004–2005	Member of Lok Sabha from Bhagalpur
2006–2020	Member of Bihar Legislative Council
2005–2013	Deputy Chief Minister of Bihar & Finance Minister of Bihar
2013–2017	Leader of Opposition in the Bihar Legislative Council
2017–2020	Deputy Chief Minister of Bihar & Finance Minister of Bihar
2020–2024	Member, Rajya Sabha

== See also ==
- List of finance ministers of Bihar
- List of deputy chief ministers of Bihar
- List of politicians from Bihar

Lok Sabha
Preceded by Subodh Ray	Member of Parliament for Bhagalpur; 2004 – 2006	Succeeded by Syed Shahnawaz Hussain
