= Mukesh Kumar Raushan =

Indian politician

Member of the Bihar Legislative Assembly
- In office 2020 – 14 Nov 2025
- Preceded by: Tej Pratap Yadav
- Succeeded by: Sanjay Kumar Singh
- Constituency: Mahua

Personal details
- Born: 12 May 1985 (age 40) Hajipur, Bihar
- Party: Rashtriya Janata Dal
- Occupation: Politician dental surgeon businessman and social work

Mukesh Kumar Raushan also known as Mukesh Yadav (born May 12, 1985, Hajipur, Bihar, India) is an Indian politician who was elected as a member of Bihar Legislative Assembly from Mahua constituency in 2020 as a member of Rashtriya Janata Dal and defeated Ashma Praveen of Janata Dal (United). He will contest from Mahua vidhan sabha in 2025 Bihar election.

== See also ==
- Mahua Assembly constituency
