= Mahua Assembly constituency =

Coordinates: 25°48′45″N 85°23′55″E

Mahua
- Constituency No. 126 for the Bihar Legislative Assembly

Constituency details
- Country: India
- Region: East India
- State: Bihar
- District: Vaishali
- Established: 1951
- Total electors: 295,843

Member of Legislative Assembly
- 18th Bihar Legislative Assembly
- Incumbent Sanjay Kumar Singh; PHED Minister, Bihar
- Party: LJP(RV)
- Alliance: NDA
- Elected year: 2025
- Preceded by: Mukesh Kumar Raushan; RJD

Mahua is an assembly constituency in Vaishali district, Bihar, India.

== Overview ==
As per Delimitation of Parliamentary and Assembly constituencies Order, 2008, No. 126 Mahua Assembly constituency is composed of the following: Mahua and Chehara Kala community development blocks.

Mahua Assembly constituency is part of No. 21 Hajipur (LokSabha constituency) (SC).

== Members of the Legislative Assembly ==
Year	Member	Party
1952	Veerchand Patel	Indian National Congress
1952	Phudeni Prasad	Socialist Party
1957	Bindeshwari Prasad Verma	Indian National Congress
1957	Shivnandan Ram	Indian National Congress
1962	Mira Devi	Indian National Congress
1967-1977: Constituency did not exist
1977	Phudeni Prasad	Janata Party
1980	Dasai Chowdhary	Janata Party (Secular)
1985	Dasai Chowdhary	Lokdal
1990	Munsilal Paswan	Janata Dal
1995	Munsilal Paswan	Janata Dal
2000	Dasai Chowdhary	Rashtriya Janata Dal
2005	Shiv Chandra Ram	Rashtriya Janata Dal
2005	Shiv Chandra Ram	Rashtriya Janata Dal
2010	Ravindra Ray	Janata Dal (United)
2015	Tej Pratap Yadav	Rashtriya Janata Dal
2020	Mukesh Kumar Raushan	Rashtriya Janata Dal
2025	Sanjay Kumar Singh	Lok Janshakti Party (Ram Vilas)

== Election results ==
=== 2025 ===
Bihar Assembly election, 2025: Mahua
Party	Candidate	Votes	%	±%
LJP(RV)	Sanjay Kumar Singh	87,641	41.47	
RJD	Mukesh Kumar Raushan	42,644	20.18	▼16.3
JJD	Tej Pratap Yadav	35,703	16.89	
AIMIM	Amit Kumar	15,783	7.47	
Independent	Ashma Parveen	7,427	3.51	
BSP	Rimjhim Devi	6,739	3.19	
Independent	Ram Sagar Sahni	3,649	1.73	
JSP	Indrajeet Pradhan	2,386	1.13	
NOTA	None of the above	2,717	1.29	▲0.36
Majority		44,997	21.29	▲13.28
Turnout		211,328	71.34	▲11.3
LJP(RV) gain from RJD		Swing		

=== 2020 ===
Bihar Assembly election, 2020: Mahua
Party	Candidate	Votes	%	±%
RJD	Mukesh Kumar Raushan	62,747	36.48	−6.86
JD(U)	Ashma Parveen	48,977	28.47	
LJP	Sanjay Kumar Singh	25,198	14.65	
RLSP	Ravindra Kumar	6,341	3.69	
Independent	Vinod Kumar	4,898	2.85	
Independent	Archana Kumari Jha	2,526	1.47	
Independent	Amresh Kumar	2,106	1.22	
Bhartiya Party (Loktantrik)	Suman Kumar Sinha	2,068	1.2	
Apna Kisan Party	Vikash Kumar Sharma	1,939	1.13	
Bhartiya Rashtriya Dal	Baidyanath Prasad Ray	1,786	1.04	
Independent	Puran Thakur	1,735	1.01	
NOTA	None of the above	1,595	0.93	−0.33
Majority		13,770	8.01	−10.22
Turnout		172,026	60.04	+1.83
RJD hold		Swing		

=== 2015 ===
2015 Bihar Legislative Assembly election: Mahua
Party	Candidate	Votes	%	±%
RJD	Tej Pratap Yadav	66,927	43.34	
HAM(S)	Ravindra Ray	38,772	25.11	
Independent	Binod Kumar	15,578	10.09	
JAP(L)	Jageshwar Ray	3,961	2.56	
Janta Dal Rashtravadi	Rizwanul Azam	3,189	2.06	
SDPI	Reyaz Ahmad	2,624	1.7	
CPI	Vishwanath Ray Viplavi	1,898	1.23	
BSP	Ashoke Krantti	1,814	1.17	
Bhartiya Dalit Party	Satyanarayan Sharma	1,625	1.05	
Independent	Surjit Kumar	1,580	1.02	
Aap Aur Hum Party	Mohammad Alam	1,399	0.91	
NOTA	None of the above	1,942	1.26	
Majority		28,155	18.23	
Turnout		154,435	58.21	
