= Tej Pratap Yadav =

Indian politician and YouTuber (born 1988)

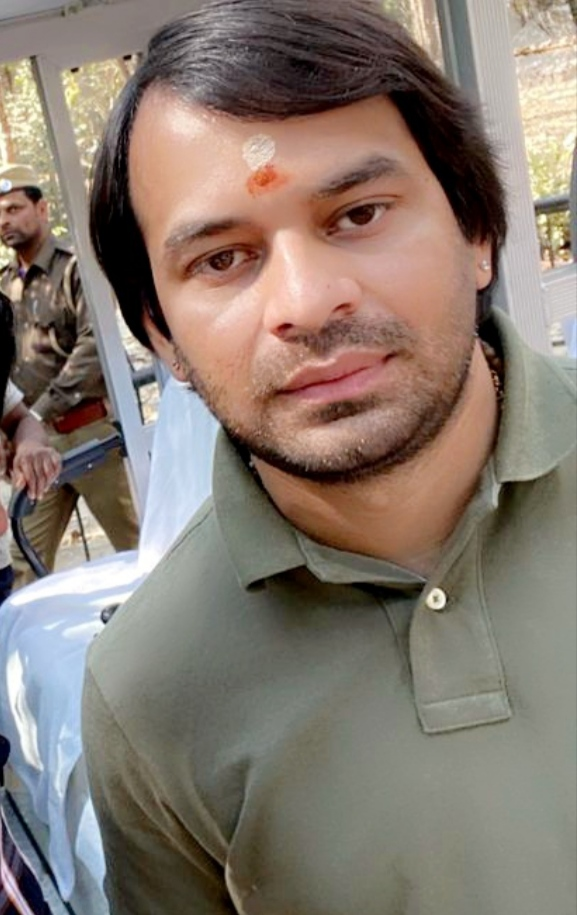
- Yadav in 2023

Cabinet Minister Government of Bihar
- In office 16 August 2022 – 28 January 2024
- Governor: Rajendra Arlekar; Phagu Chauhan
- Chief Minister: Nitish kumar
- Ministry and Departments: Environment; Forest & Climate Change
- Preceded by: Neeraj Kumar Singh
- In office 20 November 2015 – 26 July 2017
- Governor: Ram Nath Kovind; Keshari Nath Tripathi
- Chief Minister: Nitish Kumar
- Ministry and Departments: Health; Forest and Environment; Backward & Extremely Backward Class Welfare
- Preceded by: Ashwini Kumar Choubey
- Succeeded by: Mangal Pandey

Member of the Bihar Legislative Assembly
- In office 8 November 2020 – 14 November 2025
- Preceded by: Raj Kumar Ray
- Succeeded by: Raj Kumar Ray
- Constituency: Hasanpur
- In office 2015–2020
- Preceded by: Ravindra Ray Yadav
- Succeeded by: Mukesh Raushan
- Constituency: Mahua

President of the Janshakti Janta Dal
- Incumbent
- Assumed office 26 September 2025
- Preceded by: Office Established

Personal details
- Born: 16 April 1988 (age 38) Gopalganj, Bihar, India
- Party: Janshakti Janata Dal (2025-present)
- Other political affiliations: Rashtriya Janata Dal (till 2025)
- Spouse: Aishwarya Rai (m. 2018)
- Domestic partner(s): Anushka Yadav (m. 2013) (Note: In May 2025, Tej Pratap Yadav shared on social media that he had been in a relationship with Anushka Yadav for 12 years, but later said his account was hacked. He had earlier married Aishwarya Rai in 2018, and their divorce is still pending.) (alleged) and Nishu Sinha (m. 2025) (alleged)
- Relations: Tejashwi Yadav (brother); Misa Bharti (sister); Tej Pratap Singh Yadav (brother-in-law); Chiranjeev Rao (brother-in-law); Sadhu Yadav (uncle); Subhash Prasad Yadav (uncle); Chandrika Roy (father-in-law)
- Parents: Lalu Prasad Yadav (father); Rabri Devi (mother)
- Occupation: Politician

Tej Pratap Yadav (born 16 April 1988) is an Indian politician and content creator. He was cabinet minister of Environment, Forest and Climate Change in the Government of Bihar. He is the elder son of former Chief Ministers of Bihar, Lalu Prasad Yadav and Rabri Devi.

== Early life and education ==
Tej Pratap Yadav was born on 16 April 1988 in Gopalganj, Bihar. He is the elder son among the seven daughters and two sons of two former Chief Ministers of Bihar, Lalu Prasad Yadav and his wife Rabri Devi. His 7 sisters are Misa Bharti, Rohini, Chanda, Ragini, Hema, Anushka and Raj Lakshmi Yadav. Tejashwi Yadav is his younger brother.

He passed the 12th (Intermediate) from BSEB in 2010, as stated in the affidavit submitted by him during the 2020 Bihar Legislative Assembly election.

== Personal life ==
He married Aishwarya Rai, the daughter of Chandrika Rai and granddaughter of Bihar's former Chief Minister, Daroga Prasad Rai. He has been accused by his wife of beating her, using drugs, and cross-dressing. One of his grievances against his wife, according to the Times of India report, is that "she has not been able to adjust to his way of life".

On 24 May 2025, he publicly revealed his 12-year relationship with Anushka Yadav via Facebook. Yadav initially claimed that his account had been compromised, and the post was later removed. However, on 30 June 2025 in an interview with Chitra Tripathi of ABP News, he admitted that he had made the post himself and deleted it later due to family pressure. Despite his 2018 marriage to Aishwarya Rai, which is still pending in the family court, it is thought that he has been with Anushka for the past 12 years and that the two are already married, based on a number of widely circulated photos and other sources.

In a post on X the next day, his father, Lalu Yadav, declared that he was expelled from his family and the party.

== Political career ==
He became a Cabinet Minister of Health in Nitish Kumar's government from November 2015 until July 2017. In December 2015, as the Environment Minister of Bihar, he promoted horse-riding as an initiative to curb pollution in the state.

The marital discord between Yadav and Aishwarya Roy, daughter of Chandrika Roy, resulted into political "subplot in fight for Parsa seat" of Bihar Assembly, in 2020. Aishwarya also urged the public to vote for CM Nitish Kumar, who is a key political rival of her husband's family.

Tej Pratap Yadav was officially removed from the Rashtriya Janata Dal (RJD) for six years over irresponsible behaviour and failing to conform to probity and family values by RJD president Lalu Prasad Yadav on 25 May 2025.

=== Team Tej Pratap Yadav ===
Tej Pratap Yadav announced an alliance with five minor Bihar-based political parties including Vanchit Vikaas Insaan Party, Bhojpuriya Jan Morcha, Pragatisheel Janata Party, Wajib Adhikar Party and Sanyukt Kisan Vikas Party on 5 August 2025 during a press conference at Maurya Hotel, Patna to contest 2025 Bihar Legislative Assembly election. While, Yadav haven't floated any political party and he is planning to contest election as an Independent candidate.

=== Janshakti Janta Dal ===
Janshakti Janata Dal ("People's Power Party"), abbreviated as JJD, is an Indian political party founded by Tej Pratap Yadav, the son of Lalu Prasad Yadav and Rabri Devi, on 26 September 2025, following his expulsion from the Rashtriya Janata Dal. After the conclusion of the 2025 Bihar Legislative Assembly election, party president Tej Pratap Yadav announced that the Janshakti Janata Dal would extend support to the NDA government.

Yadav had, on 18 August 2025, floated the new political party, which had been led by Balendra Das as President since its formation before the 2024 Indian general election. Dainik Jagran reported that the party has been registered since 2020.

Yadav however lost the election to LJP(RV) candidate Sanjay Kumar Singh and came third behind Singh and incumbent MLA Mukesh Kumar Raushan of the RJD. Mr Yadav garnered around 35,000 votes but lost by a huge margin of 51,000 votes.

== Television career ==
In 2026, Yadav made his television debut with Bhojpuri Bawaal, billed as the first Bhojpuri celebrity reality show. The show premiered on 2 August 2026 on JioHotstar and Colors TV. Its cast included Pawan Singh, Dinesh Lal Yadav 'Nirahua', Aamrapali Dubey and Kajal Raghwani. The show did not use the usual format of tasks and eliminations. It followed the personal and professional lives of its participants instead. In a review for ThePrint, Harsh Tiwari called Yadav the show's funniest participant. Tiwari pointed to scenes such as Yadav's visit to a Patna university and a dinner he hosted to bring Bhojpuri stars together.

In September 2026, Yadav joined Rise & Fall season 2 as a contestant. The reality show is hosted by former cricketer Virender Sehwag and premiered on 26 September 2026. In the show's promo, he compared himself to a banyan tree whose roots are stronger than its branches. He also said he planned to hold a darbaar in the show's penthouse. During the show, he became emotional while speaking about his mother, Rabri Devi, in a conversation with fellow contestant Swara Bhasker.

== Positions held ==
Tej Pratap Yadav has served 2 times as MLA.

From	To	Position	Constituency
2015	2020	MLA in the 16th Bihar Assembly	Mahua
2020	2025	MLA in the 17th Bihar Assembly	Hasanpur

== Controversies ==
On 24 May 2025, Tej Pratap Yadav posted a photo on Facebook with a woman named Anushka Yadav, claiming they had been in a romantic relationship for 12 years. The post quickly went viral, sparking public backlash and internal party tensions. The following day, Lalu Prasad Yadav announced his son's expulsion from the RJD for six years and severed familial ties, citing that Tej Pratap's public behavior contradicted the moral values upheld by the party and the family. Tej Pratap later claimed that his Facebook account had been hacked and that the post was part of a conspiracy to defame him. However. on 30 June 2025 he admitted that he had made the post himself.

=== Holi incident involving police officer ===
On 14 March 2025, during Holi celebrations at his official residence in Patna, Tej Pratap Yadav was recorded instructing his bodyguard, Constable Deepak Kumar, to dance to a song, threatening suspension if he refused. In the video, Yadav is heard saying; "Ae sipahi, Deepak, ek gana bajayenge uspe tumko thumka lagana hai. Bura mat mano Holi hai. Aaj nahi thumka lagaoge toh suspend kar diye jaoge." (transl. Hey Sipahi, Deepak, i'll play a song and you have to dance to it. Don't take it badly, it's Holi. If you don't dance today, you'll be suspended.)

The incident sparked widespread criticism, with opposition parties accusing Yadav of abusing his position and disrespecting the police force. JDU national spokesperson Rajiv Ranjan commented that such behavior reflects a return to the 'Jungle Raj' era in Bihar.

=== Tej Pratap threatens PM Modi over Lalu's security downgrade ===
In 2017, Tej Pratap Yadav threatened to skin Prime Minister Narendra Modi alive after Lalu Prasad's security was downgraded from Z+ to Z. Lalu defended his son over this. On the last day of voting in the 2019 general elections, a video of an alleged assault on a video journalist by his bodyguards went viral, while Yadav lodged an FIR calling it a conspiracy to kill him.

== YouTube career ==
Tej Pratap Yadav also runs a YouTube vlog channel called "LR Vlog", YouTube (@lrvlog1624) in which he shares his daily life and travel videos. Recently, his channel crossed 1 lakh subscribers. To celebrate 1 lakh subscribers milestone, a hoarding featuring Yadav was cropped up in Bihar's capital Patna. The hoarding was a "Thank You" to the 1 lakh subscribers of his vlog channel, while also urging people to subscribe to his YouTube channel. After losing in the 2025 Bihar Assembly election, he launched a new YouTube channel named TY vlogs.

== Filmography ==
=== Television ===
Year	Show	Role	Note	Ref.
2026	Rise and Fall 2	Contestant	16th place	
