= Vimal Rajbanshi =

Indian politician

Vimal Rajbanshi (born 1966) is an Indian politician from Bihar. He is a member of Legislative Assembly of Bihar representing the Rajauli Assembly constituency, which is reserved for Scheduled Caste community in Nawada district of Bihar. He is a member of the Lok Janshakti Party (Ram Vilas).

== Early life ==
He is from Rajauli, Bihar. He is the son of Chando Rajbanhi.

== Career ==
Rajbanshi was elected from the Rajauli Assembly constituency representing the Lok Janshakti Party (Ram Vilas) in the 2025 Bihar Legislative Assembly election. He polled 90,272 votes and defeated his nearest rival, Pinki Bharti of RJD by a margin of 3953 votes. He became an MLA for the first time.
