= List of leaders of the opposition in the Bihar Legislative Council =

Bihar Vidhan Parishad Vipaksha Neta

Leader of the Opposition of Bihar Legislative Council
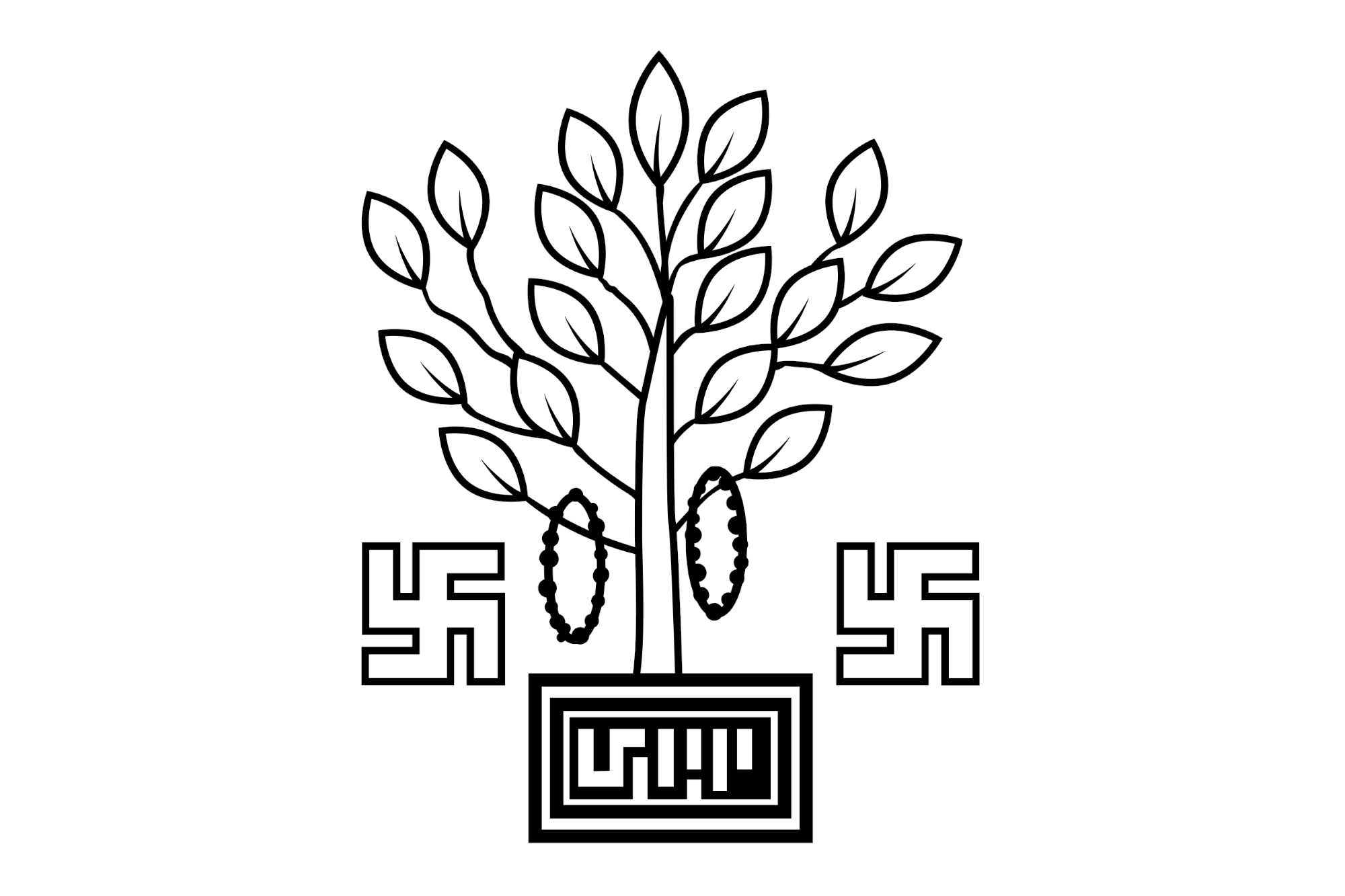
- Seal of Bihar Government

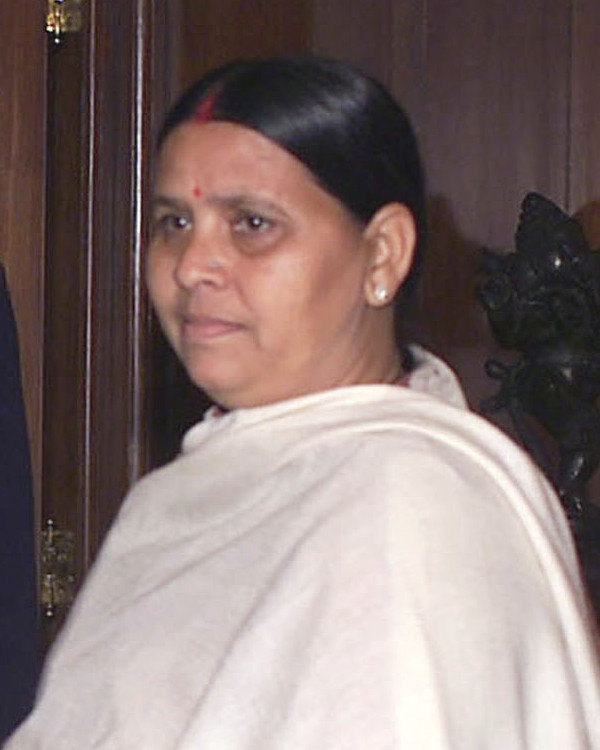
- Incumbent; Rabri Devi since 16 February 2024
- Member of: Bihar Legislative Council
- Seat: Vidhan Parishad
- Nominator: Members of Official Opposition
- Appointer: Chair of Bihar Legislative Council
- Term length: 5 years No renewable limit

The leader of the opposition is the politician who leads the official opposition in the Bihar Legislative Council. The incumbent leader of opposition in the upper house of state legislature is Rabri Devi.

== Leaders of the opposition ==
No	Portrait	Name	Constituency	Term of office			Chief Minister	Party
		Ganga Prasad Chaurasia	MLA's	20 November 2000	5 March 2005	4 years, 105 days	Rabri Devi	Bharatiya Janata Party
		Ghulam Ghaus	MLA's	18 March 2011	19 June 2013	2 years, 93 days	Nitish Kumar	Rashtriya Janata Dal
		Sushil Modi	MLA's	19 June 2013	27 July 2017	4 years, 38 days	Nitish Kumar	Bharatiya Janata Party
Vacant since no opposition party had 10% seats				27 July 2017	12 May 2018	289 days	Nitish Kumar	N/A
		Rabri Devi	MLA's	12 May 2018	23 June 2020	2 years, 42 days	Nitish Kumar	Rashtriya Janata Dal
Vacant since no opposition party had 10% seats				23 June 2020	11 April 2022	2 years, 47 days	Nitish Kumar	N/A
		Rabri Devi	MLA's	11 April 2022	9 August 2022	120 days	Nitish Kumar	Rashtriya Janata Dal
		Samrat Chaudhary	MLA's	24 August 2022	20 August 2023	361 days	Nitish Kumar	Bharatiya Janata Party
		Hari Sahni	MLA's	20 August 2023	16 February 2024	180 days	Nitish Kumar	Bharatiya Janata Party
		Rabri Devi	MLA's	16 February 2024	incumbent	2 years, 203 days	Nitish Kumar	Rashtriya Janata Dal
