= Satish Kumar Yadav =

Indian politician from Bihar

Member of Bihar Legislative Assembly
- In office 24 November 2010 – 8 November 2015
- Preceded by: Rabri Devi
- Succeeded by: Tejashwi Yadav
- Constituency: Raghopur

Personal details
- Born: 9 February 1966 (age 60) Vaishali district, Bihar, India
- Party: Bharatiya Janata Party (2015–present)
- Other political affiliations: Janata Dal (United) (2005–2015); Rashtriya Janata Dal (1990–2005)
- Parent: Shyam Narayan Yadav (father)
- Education: Magadh University
- Profession: Politician, Farmer

Satish Kumar Yadav (born 9 February 1966), also known as Satish Rai, is an Indian politician and farmer from Bihar. He represented the Raghopur constituency in the Bihar Legislative Assembly from 2010 to 2015. As of 2025, he is affiliated with the Bharatiya Janata Party (BJP). He is also known among locals for his social work, particularly for helping poor and needy people in the region.

== Early life and education ==
Satish Kumar Yadav was born on 9 February 1966 in Rampur Shyamchand village, Raghopur, Vaishali district, Bihar. His father, Shyam Narayan Yadav, was a farmer. He completed his post-graduation (M.Sc.) from Magadh University.

== Political career ==
Yadav began his political career with the Rashtriya Janata Dal (RJD) and later joined the Janata Dal (United) (JDU). In the 2010 Bihar Legislative Assembly election, he contested from Raghopur on a JDU ticket and defeated former Chief Minister Rabri Devi by a margin of 13,006 votes.

Due to the JDU-RJD alliance in 2015, the Raghopur seat was allotted to RJD, and Tejashwi Yadav contested and won. Satish Kumar Yadav then joined the Bharatiya Janata Party (BJP) and contested as its candidate but lost by 22,733 votes.

In the 2020 Bihar Legislative Assembly election, Satish Kumar Yadav once again contested from Raghopur as a BJP candidate against Tejashwi Yadav. However, the presence of the Lok Janshakti Party (LJP) candidate divided the Rajput vote base, which led to Yadav losing by a margin of 38,174 votes.

In the 2025 Bihar Legislative Assembly election, Yadav is again contesting from Raghopur as the BJP candidate against Tejashwi Yadav, creating a tough electoral battle.

In the 2025 Bihar Legislative Assembly election, Satish Kumar Yadav contested from the Raghopur Assembly constituency as the Bharatiya Janata Party candidate. He received 1,04,065 votes and finished as the runner-up, losing to Tejashwi Yadav by a margin of 14,532 votes.

== Personal life ==
Yadav resides in Rampur Shyamchand, Raghopur, Vaishali. Apart from politics, he is involved in agriculture and is popularly known among locals as “Satish Rai.”

== See also ==
- Raghopur (Vidhan Sabha constituency)
- Tejashwi Yadav
- Bihar Legislative Assembly
