= Rabri Devi =

Indian politician (born 1959)

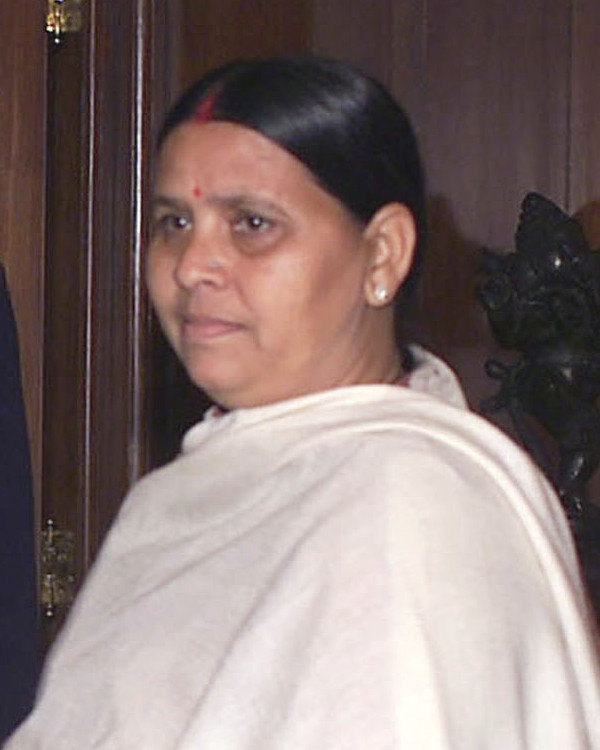
- Devi in 2005

Leader of the Opposition in Bihar Legislative Council
- Incumbent
- Assumed office 14 February 2024
- Preceded by: Hari Sahni
- In office 13 April 2022 – 9 August 2022
- Leader: Nitish Kumar
- Preceded by: Herself
- Succeeded by: Samrat Choudhary
- In office 12 May 2018 – 23 June 2020
- Preceded by: Sushil Kumar Modi
- Succeeded by: Herself

21st Chief Minister of Bihar
- In office 11 March 2000 – 6 March 2005
- Governor: V. C. Pande; M. Rama Jois; Buta Singh
- Preceded by: Nitish Kumar
- Succeeded by: President's rule
- In office 9 March 1999 – 2 March 2000
- Governor: V. C. Pande
- Preceded by: President's rule
- Succeeded by: Nitish Kumar
- In office 25 July 1997 – 11 February 1999
- Governor: A. R. Kidwai; Sunder Singh Bhandari
- Preceded by: Lalu Prasad Yadav
- Succeeded by: President's rule

Member of Bihar Legislative Council
- Incumbent
- Assumed office 7 May 2012
- Constituency: Elected by the MLAs
- In office 11 December 1997 – 2 June 2000
- Constituency: Elected by the MLAs

18th Leader of the Opposition in Bihar Legislative Assembly
- In office 20 November 2005 – 23 December 2010
- Preceded by: Upendra Kushwaha
- Succeeded by: Abdul Bari Siddiqui

Member of Bihar Legislative Assembly
- In office 2 June 2000 – 26 November 2010
- Preceded by: Lalu Prasad
- Succeeded by: Satish Kumar Yadav
- Constituency: Raghopur

Personal details
- Born: 1 January 1959 (age 67) Salar Kalan, Bihar, India
- Party: Rashtriya Janata Dal
- Other political affiliations: Janata Dal
- Spouse: Lalu Prasad (m. 1973)
- Relations: Tej Pratap Singh Yadav (son-in-law); Chiranjeev Rao (son-in-law); Sadhu Yadav (brother); Subhash Prasad Yadav (brother)
- Children: 9 (including Tejashwi, Tej Pratap and Misa)

Rabri Devi (Devanagri: राबड़ी देवी, IAST: rābar̤ī devī Sanskrit pronunciation: [ɾɑːbəɽiː d̪eːʋiː]) is an Indian politician who currently serves as the leader of the opposition in the Bihar Legislative Council. She served as the chief minister of Bihar almost continuously between 1997 to 2005; she is the first and only woman till date to have held the office. She is also served as leader of the house in legislative assembly). She was a member (MLA) of Bihar Legislative Assembly and previously served as the leader of the opposition in the Bihar Legislative Assembly.

A member of the Rashtriya Janata Dal, she is married to Indian politician Lalu Prasad Yadav, the former chief minister of Bihar from 1990–1997. Her sons Tejashwi Yadav & Tej Pratap Yadav and daughter Misa Bharti are also politicians.

== Early life and education ==
Rabri was born in 1955 in Salar Kalan village, located near Mirganj in the Gopalganj district of Bihar. However, she has stated in affidavits submitted for elections that her birth year is as early as 1953. Her parents are Sib Prasad Chaudhary and Maharjia Devi. She is named after an Indian sweet as per a custom in her family. Her 3 sisters are similarly named Jalebi, Rasgulla and Paan.

She has studied only up to the fifth standard at a local school in her village. Her parents were hesitant to send their daughters to schools located far away. As a result, none of her sisters got any formal education. Prabhunath Yadav, Subhash Prasad Yadav and Sadhu Yadav are her three brothers.

== Political career ==
Devi became the first female Chief Minister of Bihar on 25 July 1997, after her husband, incumbent chief minister Lalu Prasad Yadav, was forced to resign following the arrest warrant issued against him in corruption charges relating to the Fodder scam. Her appointment as the chief minister of Bihar is considered one of the most unexpected decisions in Indian political history, as she was a traditional housewife and had no prior interest in politics. She came under severe criticism and mockery, due to her illiteracy and inexperience.

She went on to rule the state until 2005. She was also the last chief minister of undivided Bihar.

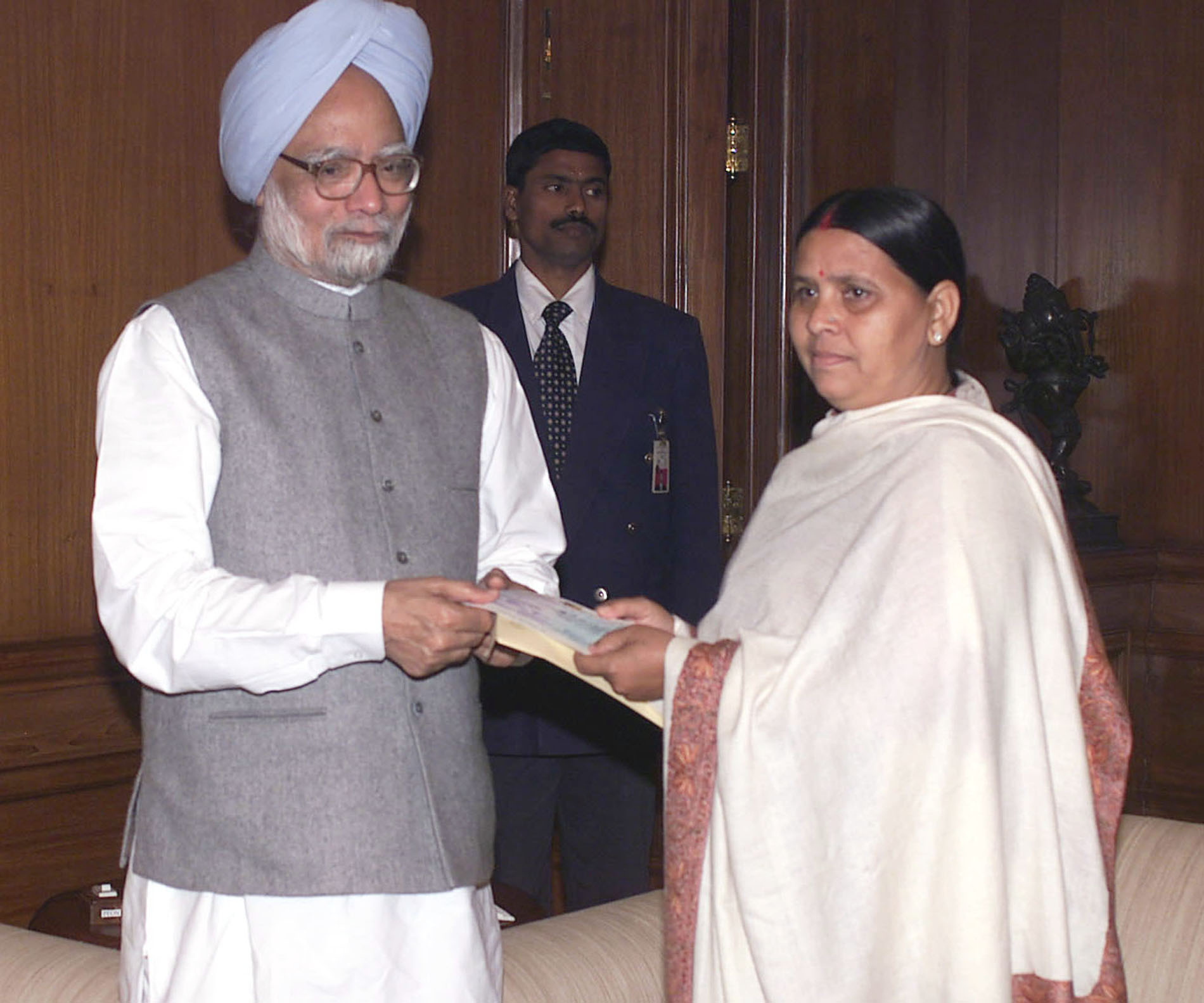
Bihar CM Devi presents Rs.10 crore cheque to Prime Minister of the time, Manmohan Singh for the national relief fund

Devi was elected thrice to the Bihar Vidhan Sabha from the Raghopur seat. In the 2010 Bihar Legislative Assembly election, Devi contested from two seats: Raghopur and Sonpur, but lost both in an election where the Rashtriya Janata Dal faced defeat, winning only 22 seats.

She contested from Saran in 2014 Lok Sabha election but lost to Rajiv Pratap Rudy of BJP.

Devi was elected unopposed to the Legislative Council in 2024 elections.

== Personal life and family ==
Rabri Devi married Lalu Prasad on 1 June 1973 at the age of 18 years, in an arranged marriage. Together, they have seven daughters and two sons. During her wedding, Lalu went on to demand an additional ₹5,000 as dowry from her father, which was eventually fulfilled.

She is also known for maintaining a simple and grounded public image while continuing to remain active in Bihar politics as a senior leader.

== Positions held ==
Rabri Devi has been elected 3 times as MLA and 4 times as MLC.

#	From	To	Position	Party
1.	1997	2000	MLC (1st term) in Bihar Legislative Council; Chief Minister (1st & 2nd term) in Government of Bihar	RJD
2.	2000	2005	MLA (1st term) from Raghopur (by-poll); Chief Minister (3rd term) in Government of Bihar	RJD
3.	Feb 2005	Oct 2005	MLA (2nd term) from Raghopur	RJD
4.	2005	2010	MLA (3rd term) from Raghopur; Leader of Opposition in Bihar Legislative Assembly (1st term)	RJD
5.	2012	2018	MLC (2nd term) in Bihar Legislative Council	RJD
6.	2018	2024	MLC (3rd term) in Bihar Legislative Council; Leader of Opposition in Bihar Legislative Council (1st & 2nd term)	RJD
7.	2024	Present	MLC (4th term) in Bihar Legislative Council; Leader of Opposition in Bihar Legislative Council (3rd term)	RJD

Preceded by Lalu Prasad Yadav	Chief Minister of Bihar; 1997—1999	Succeeded by President's rule
Preceded by President's rule	Chief Minister of Bihar; 1999—2000	Succeeded by Nitish Kumar
Preceded by Nitish Kumar	Chief Minister of Bihar; 2000—2005	Succeeded by President's rule
