= Raghopur Assembly constituency =

Assembly constituency in Bihar, India

Coordinates: 25°31′06″N 85°22′50″E

Raghopur
- Constituency No. 128 for the Bihar Legislative Assembly

Constituency details
- Country: India
- Region: East India
- State: Bihar
- District: Vaishali
- Lok Sabha constituency: Hajipur
- Established: 1951
- Total electors: 345,491

Member of Legislative Assembly
- 18th Bihar Legislative Assembly
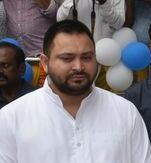
- Incumbent Tejashwi Yadav
- Party: RJD
- Alliance: MGB
- Elected year: 2025
- Preceded by: Satish Kumar Yadav

Raghopur is an assembly constituency in Vaishali district in the Indian state of Bihar. It consists of Raghopur and Bidupur.

Lalu Prasad Yadav won this seat twice, his wife Rabri Devi won it three times, and they both served as Chief Minister while representing this seat. Their son Tejashwi Yadav has also won it twice (2015, 2020, 2025) and been Deputy CM and Leader of Opposition while holding it. Rabri Devi has also lost from this seat once, in 2010 from Satish Kumar (JDU). Currently Satish Kumar is a member of Bharatiya Janta Party.

Most successful parties from Raghopur Assembly
1. RJD (8 times) (38.0%)
2. INC (3 times) (16.0%)
3. JD (2 times) (11.0%)
4. BJS (1 time) (5.00%)
5. Socialist Party (1 time) (5.00%)
6. SSP (1 time) (5.00%)
7. JP (1 time) (5.00%)
8. JP(S) (1 time) (5.00%)
9. LD (1 time) (5.00%)
10. JD(U) (1 time) (5.00%)

== Overview ==
As per Delimitation of Parliamentary and Assembly constituencies Order, 2008, No. 128 Raghopur Assembly constituency is composed of the following: Raghopur and Bidupur community development blocks.

Raghopur Assembly constituency is part of No. 21 Hajipur (Lok Sabha constituency) (SC).

== Members of the Legislative Assembly ==
Year	Member	Party
1952	Harivansh Narayan Singh	Indian National Congress
1957	Harivansh Narayan Singh	Indian National Congress
1962	Devendra Sinha	Socialist Party
1967
1967	Harivansh Narayan Singh	Bharatiya Jana Sangh
1969	Rambriksh Rai	Indian National Congress
1972	Babu Lal Shastri	Samyukta Socialist Party
1977	Babu Lal Shastri	Janata Party
1980	Uday Narayan Rai	Janata Party (Secular)
1985	Uday Narayan Rai	Lok Dal
1990	Uday Narayan Rai	Janata Dal
1995	Lalu Prasad Yadav	Janata Dal
1998^	Rajgir Choudhary	Rashtriya Janata Dal
2000	Lalu Prasad Yadav	Rashtriya Janata Dal
2000^	Rabri Devi	Rashtriya Janata Dal
2005	Rabri Devi	Rashtriya Janata Dal
2005	Rabri Devi	Rashtriya Janata Dal
2010	Satish Kumar Yadav	Janata Dal (United)
2015	Tejashwi Yadav	Rashtriya Janata Dal
2020	Tejashwi Yadav	Rashtriya Janata Dal
2025	Tejashwi Yadav	Rashtriya Janata Dal

^denotes by-election

== Election results ==
=== 2025 ===
Bihar Legislative Assembly Election, 2025: Raghopur
Party	Candidate	Votes	%	±%
RJD	Tejashwi Yadav	118,597	49.74	▲1.00
BJP	Satish Kumar Yadav	104,065	43.64	▲14.00
Independent	Baliram Singh	3,086	1.29	
JSP	Chanchal Kumar	2,399	1.01	
NOTA	None of the above	4,033	1.69	▼0.54
Majority		14,532	6.10	▼13.00
Turnout		238,448	69.02	▲10.99
RJD hold		Swing	▲9.01	

=== 2020 ===
2020 Bihar Legislative Assembly election: Raghopur
Party	Candidate	Votes	%	±%
RJD	Tejashwi Yadav	97,404	48.74	−0.41
BJP	Satish Kumar Yadav	59,230	29.64	−7.26
LJP	Rakesh Raushan	24,947	12.48	
Independent	Rajeshwar Ray	3,481	1.74	
JAP(L)	Kumar Sameer Raja Yadav	3,413	1.71	+1.21
Independent	Ramswaroop Ray	2,672	1.34	
NOTA	None of the above	4,458	2.23	+1.74
Majority		38,174	19.1	+6.85
Turnout		199,853	58.03	−0.43
RJD hold		Swing		

=== 2015 ===
2015 Bihar Legislative Assembly election: Raghopur
Party	Candidate	Votes	%	±%
RJD	Tejashwi Yadav	91,236	49.15	
BJP	Satish Kumar Yadav	68,503	36.9	
SP	Rakesh Raushan	5,220	2.81	
Janta Dal Rashtravadi	Rizwanul Azam	4,800	2.59	
CPI(ML)L	Rambabu Bhagat	2,538	1.37	
Independent	Arun Ray	2,381	1.28	
NOTA	None of the above	903	0.49	
Majority		22,733	12.25	
Turnout		185,628	58.46	
RJD gain from JD(U)		Swing		

=== 2010 ===
2010 Bihar Legislative Assembly election: Raghopur
Party	Candidate	Votes	%	±%
JD(U)	Satish Kumar Yadav	64,222	48.06	
RJD	Rabri Devi	51,216	38.32	
IND	Rijwanul Azam	3,877	2.90	
IND	Sant Nirala	3,844	2.88	
INC	Chandra Devi	3,824	2.86	
Majority		13,006	9.73	
Turnout		133,656	50.85	
JD(U) gain from RJD		Swing		

=== 2005 ===
- Rabri Devi (RJD): 48,460 votes
- Rajiv Ranjan (Ram Vilas Paswan's LJP) : 23,419 votes

=== 2000 ===
- LaluPrasad (RJD): 70,134 votes
- Vishundeo Rai (JD-U): 41,006 votes
  - Lalu Yadav retained Danapur seat and vacated this seat for his wife Rabri Devi.

==== 2000 bypoll ====
- Rabri Devi (RJD): 108,768 votes
- Veera Devi F JD(U): 46,951 votes

=== 1967 ===
- H. N. Singh (BJS): 23,145 votes
- R. B. Rai (INC): 20,043 votes
