= Sanjay Kumar Singh (Mahua) =

Indian politician from Bihar

Minister of Public Health Engineering Government of Bihar
- Incumbent
- Assumed office 7 May 2026
- Chief Minister: Samrat Choudhary
- Preceded by: Samrat Choudhary(as Chief Minister)
- In office 20 November 2025 – 15 April 2026
- Chief Minister: Nitish Kumar
- Preceded by: Neeraj Kumar Singh
- Succeeded by: Samrat Choudhary

Member of the Bihar Legislative Assembly
- Incumbent
- Assumed office 14 November 2025
- Preceded by: Mukesh Kumar Raushan
- Constituency: Mahua

Personal details
- Born: 12 April 1979 (age 47) Mahua, Vaishali, Bihar, India
- Party: Lok Janshakti Party (Ram Vilas)
- Spouse: Alka Singh
- Children: 2 daughters, 1 son
- Parent: Late Ramnath Singh (father)
- Education: BRABU Muzaffarpur
- Profession: Businessman, Politician

Sanjay Kumar Singh (born 12 April 1979) is an Indian politician and businessman from Bihar. He currently serves as the Minister for public health engineering of Bihar. He is the sitting Member of the Bihar Legislative Assembly from the Mahua Assembly constituency, elected for the first time in the 2025 Bihar Legislative Assembly election. He is a member of the Lok Janshakti Party (Ram Vilas), and is considered close to party national president and Union Minister Chirag Paswan.

== Early life and education ==
Sanjay Kumar Singh was born on 12 April 1979 in Mahua, Vaishali district, Bihar. He completed his graduation in 2016 from Babasaheb Bhimrao Ambedkar Bihar University (BRABU), Muzaffarpur. His father, Late Ramnath Singh, was respected locally.

== Political career ==
Singh contested the 2025 Bihar Legislative Assembly election as the NDA-backed candidate of the Lok Janshakti Party (Ram Vilas). He won the Mahua seat, defeating his opponents in a multi-cornered contest.

Before his victory, the seat was held by Mukesh Kumar Raushan. Singh received strong campaign support from Chirag Paswan and several NDA leaders.

The Election Commission of India confirmed his win with official vote data.

== Personal life ==
Sanjay Kumar Singh is married to Alka Singh. The couple has two daughters and one son. Apart from politics, he is a businessman based in Mahua.

== See also ==
- Mahua Assembly constituency
- Bihar Legislative Assembly
- Chirag Paswan
- Lok Janshakti Party (Ram Vilas)
