= Tejashwi Yadav =

Indian politician (born 1989)

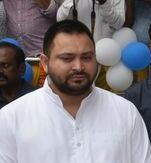
- Yadav in 2023

22nd Leader of the Opposition in Bihar Legislative Assembly
- Incumbent
- Assumed office 16 February 2024
- Chief Minister: Nitish Kumar; Samrat Choudhary
- Preceded by: Vijay Kumar Sinha
- In office 28 July 2017 – 9 August 2022
- Chief Minister: Nitish Kumar
- Preceded by: Prem Kumar
- Succeeded by: Vijay Kumar Sinha

5th Deputy Chief Minister of Bihar
- In office 10 August 2022 – 28 January 2024
- Governor: Phagu Chauhan; Rajendra Arlekar
- Chief Minister: Nitish Kumar
- Ministry and Departments: Health & Family Welfare; Road Construction; Housing & Urban Development; Rural Development
- Preceded by: Tarkishore Prasad; Renu Devi
- Succeeded by: Samrat Choudhary; Vijay Kumar Sinha
- In office 20 November 2015 – 26 July 2017
- Governor: Ram Nath Kovind; Keshari Nath Tripathi
- Chief Minister: Nitish Kumar
- Ministry and Departments: Road Construction; Building Construction; Backward Class Development
- Preceded by: Sushil Kumar Modi
- Succeeded by: Sushil Kumar Modi

Member of Bihar Legislative Assembly
- Incumbent
- Assumed office 1 December 2015
- Preceded by: Satish Kumar Yadav
- Constituency: Raghopur

1st National Working President of Rashtriya Janata Dal
- Incumbent
- Assumed office 25 january 2026

Personal details
- Born: Tejashwi Prasad Yadav; 9 November 1989 (age 37) Gopalganj, Bihar, India
- Party: Rashtriya Janata Dal (since 2015)
- Spouse: Rajshree Yadav (m. 2021)
- Relations: Tej Pratap Yadav (brother); Misa Bharti (sister); Tej Pratap Singh Yadav (brother-in-law); Chiranjeev Rao (brother-in-law); Sadhu Yadav (uncle); Subhash Prasad Yadav (uncle)
- Children: 2
- Parents: Lalu Prasad Yadav (father); Rabri Devi (mother)
- Occupation: Politician; cricketer
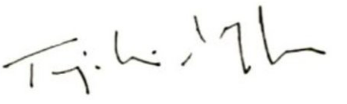
- Signature
- Cricket career

Cricket information
- Batting: Right-handed
- Bowling: Right-arm bowler
- Role: Middle-order batter

Domestic team information
- Years: Team
- 2009–10: Jharkhand

Career statistics
Competition	FC	LA	T20
Matches	1	2	4
Runs scored	20	14	3
Batting average	10.00	7.00	3.00
100s/50s	0/0	0/0	0/0
Top score	19	9	3
Balls bowled	30	24	36
Wickets	0	1	0
Bowling average	—	23.00	—
5 wickets in innings	0	0	0
10 wickets in match	0	0	0
Best bowling	—	1/10	—
Catches/stumpings	0/0	1/0	1/0
- Source: ESPNcricinfo, 2 May, 2016

Tejashwi Prasad Yadav (born 9 November 1989) is an Indian politician and former professional cricketer. He has previously served for two terms as the Deputy Chief Minister of Bihar and current leader of opposition in lower house. He is the youngest son of former Chief Ministers of Bihar Lalu Prasad Yadav and Rabri Devi.

== Early life and education ==
Mr. Yadav was born in Gopalganj, Bihar to Rabri Devi and Lalu Prasad Yadav, both former chief ministers of Bihar. He is the youngest of the nine siblings and has seven sisters and a brother. He went to school in Patna and later, moved to Delhi, along with his eldest sister, Misa Bharti. In Delhi, he attended Delhi Public School in Vasant Vihar for primary classes till Class V.

He also studied at Delhi Public School, R. K. Puram from Class 6 but dropped out. He did not complete his Class 10 and discontinued his studies to pursue sports.

== Personal life ==
On 9 December 2021, Yadav married his long-time friend, Rachel Godinho, a Goan Catholic; she later changed her name to Rajshree Yadav. She is from Rewari, Haryana, and has been living in Delhi since childhood. She and Yadav studied together at DPS school in RK Puram, New Delhi.

== Cricket career ==
As a professional cricketer, he was in the Delhi Daredevils and the Jharkhand cricket team. He is noted to have been both the youngest Deputy Chief Minister of Bihar and the youngest Leader of Opposition in India. He was featured in the Indian Express '100 Most Powerful Indians' in 2020 and 2021.

He captained his school cricket team. He played in the Delhi Public School's cricket team and was selected for the U-15 cricket team of Delhi as an all rounder at the age of 13. His team also included Virat Kohli as its captain. The U-15 team won the national championship, where Mr. Yadav had a match winning partnership with Ishant Sharma in the finals. He dropped out of his school in Class X to pursue a sports career and was eventually got into U-17 and U-19 cricket team of Delhi. He was also selected in the list of standby players for the world cup winning U-19 Indian national cricket team, later in the same year.

He was contracted by the Delhi Daredevils for the 2008 Indian Premier League franchise. But remained in the reserve bench of the team for the entire seasons between 2008 and 2012.

He was also selected for the state level Jharkhand cricket team in 2009. His professional cricket debut began with four Twenty20 matches, primarily, in the capacity of a bowler in the Syed Mushtaq Ali Trophy. Following when he was called for a first class game against Vidarbha cricket team at Dhanbad.

In 2010, he made his one-day debut in the Vijay Hazare Trophy and played two matches against Odisha cricket team and the Tripura cricket team, respectively.

In 2013, Mr. Yadav retired from his cricket career.

== Political career ==
Mr. Yadav started his political life in 2010, campaigning for the Rashtriya Janata Dal.

He first became an MLA winning the 2015 Bihar Legislative Assembly election, representing the Mahagathbandan (grand alliance) from the Raghopur constituency. The alliance won the elections and he became the Deputy Chief Minister of Bihar and was minister for public works, forestry and environment in the 5th Nitish Kumar cabinet.

In March 2018, he become the de facto leader of the Rashtriya Janata Dal. He led the Rashtriya Janata Dal in the 2020 Bihar Legislative Assembly elections, as the chief ministerial candidate of the Mahagathbandhan. The alliance won 110 seats in total out of 243, with RJD winning 75 seats, continuing to remain the single largest political party in Bihar. Since the majority required was 122, the alliance was unable to form the government, and he was elected as the Leader of Opposition of Bihar.

On 10 August 2022, he took oath as the Deputy Chief Minister of Bihar with Nitish Kumar taking oath as chief minister as part of the Mahagathbandan formed with RJD, Congress and other Opposition Parties.

In 2024, Nitish Kumar left the Mahagathbandhan and formed the government with BJP, effectively terminating Mr. Yadav's tenure as deputy chief minister once again.

He led the Rashtriya Janata Dal in the 2025 Bihar Legislative Assembly elections, as the chief ministerial candidate of the Mahagathbandhan. The alliance won 35 seats in total out of 243, with RJD winning 25 seats, a record low.

== Positions held ==
Tejashwi Yadav has served 3 times as MLA.

From	To	Position	Constituency
2015	2020	MLA in the 16th Bihar Assembly	Raghopur
2020	2025	MLA in the 17th Bihar Assembly	Raghopur
2025	Present	MLA in the 18th Bihar Assembly	Raghopur

== Criminal cases ==
=== IRCTC Hotel Tender Scam ===
In 2017, the Central Bureau of Investigation (CBI) filed a case against Lalu Prasad Yadav, Rabri Devi, Tejashwi Yadav, and others alleging irregularities in awarding contracts to maintain IRCTC hotels in Ranchi and Puri during Lalu's tenure as Railway Minister. The CBI alleged that in exchange for awarding these tenders to a private company, prime land in Patna was transferred to a shell company named "Sujata Hotel" controlled by the Yadav family at a fraction of its market value. A detailed charge sheet named Tejashwi Yadav as an accused for offences under IPC sections 120B (criminal conspiracy) and 420 (cheating), along with provisions of the Prevention of Corruption Act.

This caused Nitish Kumar to pull the Janata Dal (United), out of the alliance and form a new government along with the Bharatiya Janata Party. In 2018, he was granted bail, and the case remains under trial in a Delhi court.

=== Land-for-Jobs Scam ===
In 2022, the CBI filed a new case accusing Lalu Prasad Yadav, Rabri Devi, Tejashwi Yadav, and other family members of taking plots of land from people in return for giving them Group D railway jobs during Lalu's tenure as Railway Minister between 2004 and 2009. The Enforcement Directorate also began a separate investigation under the money laundering law, claiming the money from these deals was moved through shell companies and benami properties to benefit the family. The ED attached several properties linked to Mr. Yadav and questioned Tejashwi several times. In 2023, the CBI filed a charge sheet naming him, and the court is currently hearing arguments on whether to formally frame charges.

=== Shakti Malik Murder Allegation ===
In October 2020, former RJD leader Shakti Malik was shot dead in Purnia district, Bihar. He was killed by three men in Purnea district of Bihar on Sunday. The attackers, who arrived on a bike, entered Malik's house while he was sleeping and shot him in the head, killing him instantly.

After his murder, his family filed an FIR accusing Tejashwi Yadav and his brother Tej Pratap Yadav of planning the killing and issuing threats against him. After the killing, a video went viral in which Malik claimed that Tejashwi Prasad Yadav had demanded Rs 50 lakh as a donation for giving him a party ticket to contest from the Raniganj seat and had threatened to eliminate him if he continued his work in the constituency. The case was registered under sections for murder, criminal conspiracy, and the Arms Act.

=== Other Cases Declared in Election Affidavit ===
In his 2020 election affidavit, Tejashwi Yadav disclosed that he faces 11 criminal cases. These include charges such as criminal conspiracy, cheating, forgery, and offences under anti-corruption and money-laundering laws. Many of the cases are tied to the IRCTC and land-for-jobs scams, while others stem from FIRs filed over political protests and alleged public order violations in Bihar.

== Controversy ==
=== Defamation Case over “Gujarati Thugs” Remark ===
In 2024, Tejashwi Yadav courted controversy by remarking that “only Gujaratis can be thugs,” in an apparent jibe at economic offenders. A social worker in Gujarat filed a criminal defamation complaint against him under IPC sections 499 and 500. Tejashwi withdrew his remark in court, and in February 2024, the Supreme Court of India quashed the defamation proceedings, bringing the case to an end.

== See also ==
- 2025 Bihar Legislative Assembly election
- Lalu Prasad Yadav
- Rabri Devi
- Rashtriya Janata Dal
- List of politicians from Bihar

State Legislative Assembly
Preceded by Satish Kumar	Member of the Bihar Legislative Assembly from Raghopur Assembly constituency 2015–	Incumbent
Political offices
Preceded by Vacant	Deputy Chief Minister of Bihar in the Fifth Nitish Kumar ministry 2015 – 2017	Succeeded by Sushil Kumar Modi
Preceded by Prem Kumar (politician)	Leader of the Opposition in the Bihar Legislative Assembly; 2017 –	Succeeded by Incumbent
