= Ramshekhar Prasad Singh =

Indian politician (born 1924)

Member of Parliament, Lok Sabha
- In office 1962–1977
- Preceded by: Rajendra Singh
- Succeeded by: Lalu Prasad Yadav
- Constituency: Chapra, Bihar

Personal details
- Born: 17 January 1924
- Party: Indian National Congress
- Spouse: Lakshmi Devi

Ramshekhar Prasad Singh (born 17 January 1924) is an Indian politician. He was elected to the Lok Sabha, the lower house of the Parliament of India from Chapra, Bihar as a member of the Indian National Congress.He was defeated by Lalu Prasad Yadav in 1977.
