= Chhapra Lok Sabha constituency =

Former constituency in Bihar, India

Coordinates: 25.8°N 84.7°E

Chapra
- Former Lok Sabha constituency

Constituency details
- Country: India
- Region: East India
- State: Bihar
- Assembly constituencies: Taraiya; Marhaura; Amnour; Chapra; Garkha; Parsa; Sonpur
- Established: 1952
- Abolished: 2008
- Reservation: None

Chhapra Lok Sabha constituency was in Bihar and it existed until 2008, after which it was replaced by Saran Lok Sabha constituency, when delimitation was done.

== Assembly segments ==
Presently, Chapra Lok Sabha constituency comprises seven Vidhan Sabha (legislative assembly) segments. These are

No	Name	District	Member	Party
116	Taraiya	Saran	Janak Singh	BJP
117	Marhaura	Saran	Jitendra Kumar Ray	Rashtriya Janata Dal
118	Chapra	Saran	C. N. Gupta	BJP
119	Garkha	Saran	Surendra Ram	Rashtriya Janata Dal
120	Amnour	Saran	Krishna Kumar Mantoo	BJP
121	Parsa	Saran	Chhote Lal Ray	Rashtriya Janata Dal
122	Sonpur	Saran	Ramanuj Prasad Yadav	Rashtriya Janata Dal

== Members of Lok Sabha ==
Year	Member	Party
1957	Rajendra Singh	Praja Socialist Party
1962	Ramshekhar Prasad Singh	Indian National Congress
1967	Ramshekhar Prasad Singh	Indian National Congress
1971	Ramshekhar Prasad Singh	Indian National Congress
1977	Lalu Prasad Yadav	Janata Party
1980	Satya Deo Singh	Janata Party
1984	Ram Bahadur Singh	Janata Party
1989	Lalu Prasad Yadav	Janata Dal
1990^	Lal Babu Rai	Janata Dal
1991	Lal Babu Rai	Janata Dal
1996	Rajiv Pratap Rudy	Bharatiya Janata Party
1998	Heera Lal Rai	Rashtriya Janata Dal
1999	Rajiv Pratap Rudy	Bharatiya Janata Party
2004	Lalu Prasad Yadav	Rashtriya Janata Dal
2008 onwards : See Saran

^By-Poll

In 2004, Lok Sabha polls were countermanded in Chapra (छपरा) following allegations of rigging. Re-poll was done on 31 May 2004. Lalu won the elections after the re-poll.

== Election results ==
=== General Election, 1957 ===
1957 Indian general election: Chapra
Party	Candidate	Votes	%	±%
PSP	Rajendra Singh	75,994	45.69	New entry
INC	Leela Devi Verma	73,046	43.92	New entry
Independent	P. N. Singh	17,282	10.39	New entry
Majority		2,948	1.77	New entry
Turnout		1,66,322	42.68	New entry
PSP win (new seat)				

=== General Election, 1962 ===
1962 Indian general election: Chapra
Party	Candidate	Votes	%	±%
INC	Ramsekhar Prasad Singh	85,952	38.82	▼5.10
PSP	Rajendra Singh	64,748	29.24	▼16.45
Independent	Harmandan Prasad Yadav	34,637	15.64	N/A
Independent	Bhikari Nath	22,460	10.14	N/A
Socialist Party (India)	Ramsubhag Singh	8,593	3.88	New entry
RRP	Ratna Devi	5,030	2.27	New entry
Majority		21,204	9.58	▲7.81
Turnout		2,21,420	49.66	▲6.98
INC gain from PSP		Swing		

=== General Election, 1967 ===
1967 Indian general election: Chapra
Party	Candidate	Votes	%	±%
INC	R. P. Singh	83,267	29.89	▼8.93
SSP	H. P. Yadav	55,058	19.76	New entry
Independent	A. K. Singh	36,210	13.00	N/A
ABJS	M. Shriwastava	28,297	10.16	New entry
Jan Kranti Party	C. Singh	22,875	8.21	New entry
Independent	R. Das	15,855	5.69	N/A
SWA	S. N. Singh	15,309	5.49	New entry
Independent	V. Singh	11,433	4.10	N/A
Independent	H. Roy	10,314	3.70	N/A
Majority		28,209	10.13	▲0.55
Turnout		2,78,618	51.55	▲1.89
INC hold		Swing		

=== General Election, 1971 ===
1971 Indian general election: Chapra
Party	Candidate	Votes	%	±%
INC	Ram Shekhar Prasad Singh	129,134	42.08	▲12.19
BKD	Satyadeo Singh	89,964	29.31	New entry
PSP	Janak Yadav	27,021	8.80	New entry
ABJS	Awadhesh Kumar Singh	25,454	8.29	▼1.87
SSP	Hari Nandan Prasad Yadav	19,609	6.39	▼13.37
SUCI	Amar Kumar Pandey	7,010	2.28	
Majority		39,170	12.77	▲2.64
Turnout				
INC hold		Swing		

=== General Election, 1977 ===
1977 Indian general election: Chapra
Party	Candidate	Votes	%	±%
JP	Lalu Prasad Yadav	415,409	85.97	New entry
INC	Ram Shekhar Prasad Singh	41,609	8.61	▼33.47
CPI	Sheo Bachan Singh	21,194	4.39	New entry
Independent	Daroga Rai	2,345	0.49	N/A
Independent	Shatrughna Prasad Singh	1,951	0.40	N/A
Independent	Bhola Singh	690	0.14	N/A
Majority		373,800	77.36	▲64.59
Turnout				
JP hold		Swing		

=== General Election, 1980 ===
1980 Indian general election: Chapra
Party	Candidate	Votes	%	±%
JP	Satyadeo Singh	160,054	41.18	▼44.79
JP(S)	Lalu Prasad Yadav	151,273	38.92	New entry
INC(I)	Budhan Prasad Yadav	58,510	15.06	▲6.45
INC(U)	Ramshekhar Prasad Singh	1,991	0.51	New entry
Independent	15 Independent Candidates	16,808	4.32	N/A
Majority		8,781	2.26	▼75.10
Turnout				
JP hold		Swing		

=== General Election, 1984 ===
1984 Indian general elections: Chapra
Party	Candidate	Votes	%	±%
JP	Ram Bahadur Singh	163,494	35.91	▼5.27
INC	Bhishmaprasad Yadav	137,488	30.20	▲15.14
LKD	Lalu Prasad Yadav	128,705	28.27	New entry
BJP	Madhu Sudan Singh	7,565	1.66	New entry
Independent	12 Independent Candidates	18,004	3.96	N/A
Majority		26,006	5.71	▲3.45
Turnout				
JP hold		Swing		

=== General Election, 1989 ===
1989 Indian general election: Chapra
Party	Candidate	Votes	%	±%
JD	Lalu Prasad Yadav	333,897	51.14	New entry
JP	Lalan Singh	192,015	29.41	▼6.50
INC	Heera Lal Rai	117,327	17.97	▼12.23
Independent	11 Independent Candidates	4,978	0.76	N/A
Others	Other 3 Candidates	3,813	0.58	N/A
BSP	Om Prakash Sharma	899	0.14	New entry
Majority		141,882	21.73	▲16.02
Turnout				
JD hold		Swing		

=== By-Election, 1990 ===
Bye-election to Lok Sabha from Chapra Parliamentary Constituency - Vacancy caused due to the resignation of Shri Lalu Prasad on 26-4-1990

=== General Election, 1991 ===
1991 Indian general election: Chapra
Party	Candidate	Votes	%	±%
JD	Lal Babu Rai	350,282	53.85	
JP	Lalan Singh	225,709	34.70	
INC	Ram Jaypal Singh Yadav	42,293	6.50	
BJP	Ram Das Rai	26,955	4.14	
Independent	17 Independent Candidates	4,658	0.72	
Others	Other 3 Candidates	614	0.10	
Majority		124,573	19.15	
Turnout				
JD hold		Swing		

=== General Election, 1996 ===
1996 Indian general election: Chhapra
Party	Candidate	Votes	%	±%
BJP	Rajiv Pratap Rudy	339,086	47.80	▲43.66
JD	Lal Babu Rai	323,590	45.61	▼8.24
Independent	Ram Babu Rai	22,912	3.23	N/A
INC	Kavita Singh	12,489	1.76	▼4.74
Others	Other 20 Independent Candidates	10,812	1.52	N/A
AIIC(T)	Devendra Singh	516	0.07	New entry
Majority		15,496	2.19	▼16.96
Turnout		7,09,405	71.41	
BJP hold		Swing		

=== General Election, 1998 ===
1998 Indian general election: Chapra
Party	Candidate	Votes	%	±%
RJD	Heera Lal Rai	331,591	44.96	New entry
BJP	Rajiv Pratap Rudy	322,264	43.70	▼4.10
JD	Chandrika Rai	66,148	8.97	▼36.64
BJC	Baidya Nath Prasad Singh Vikal	5,810	0.79	New entry
Independent	Anil Kumar Singh	5,092	0.69	N/A
SP	Janak Yadav	3,261	0.44	New entry
Independent	Pramod Kumar Singh	1,918	0.26	N/A
Independent	Srikant Prasad	1,411	0.19	N/A
Majority		9,327	1.26	▼0.93
Turnout				
RJD hold		Swing		

=== General Election, 1999 ===
1999 Indian general elections: Chapra
Party	Candidate	Votes	%	±%
BJP	Rajiv Pratap Rudy	390,477	50.71	▲7.01
RJD	Hira Lal Rai	346,924	45.05	▲0.09
BSP	Bachchu Prasad Biru	12,378	1.61	New entry
JD(S)	Lal Babu Rai	11,689	1.52	New entry
Independent	Praveen Kumar	3,208	0.42	N/A
Independent	Anil Kumar Singh	2,562	0.33	N/A
NCP	Ajay Kumar Singh	2,385	0.31	New entry
Independent	Ram Kripal Prasad Yadav	452	0.06	N/A
Majority		43,553	5.66	▲4.40
Turnout				
BJP hold		Swing		

=== General Election, 2004 ===
2004 Indian general elections: Chapra
Party	Candidate	Votes	%	±%
RJD	Lalu Prasad Yadav	228,882	51.31	▲6.26
BJP	Rajiv Pratap Rudy	168,459	37.76	▼12.95
BSP	Abhay Raj Kishor Rai	12,322	2.76	▲1.15
Independent	Brajesh Kumar	10,753	2.41	N/A
SP	Bachchu Prasad	8,910	2.00	New entry
Independent	Narendra Kumar Singh	5,775	1.29	N/A
Independent	Manoranjan Kumar Srivastava	5,264	1.18	N/A
Independent	Kamala Saran	3,187	0.71	N/A
AD(K)	Rajeshwar Singh	2,549	0.57	New entry
Majority		60,423	13.55	▲7.89
Turnout				
RJD hold		Swing		

== See also ==
- Saran (Lok Sabha constituency)
- Saran district
- List of former constituencies of the Lok Sabha
