= Vijai Shankar Dubey =

Indian civil servant

V S Dubey
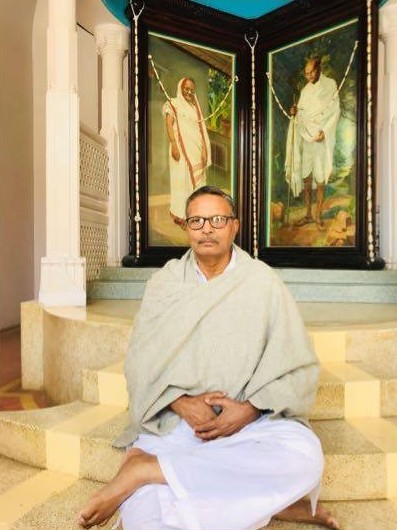

Former Chief Secretary / Vice Chancellor

Personal details
- Born: 15 July 1942 (age 84)
- Spouse: Asha Dubey
- Children: Shalini; Shivani; Vikas
- Education: Postgraduate in History from Allahabad University.
- Alma mater: Allahabad University,

Vijai Shankar Dubey is an Indian Administrative Service officer of 1966 cadre batch. He is the only IAS officer to have served as Chief Secretary of two states Bihar & Jharkhand.

== Career ==
V S Dubey is a native of Village Odra District Ambedkar Nagar( Then Ayodhya)Uttar Pradesh. He was a gold medalist from the Allahabad University and joined IAS in 1966. He was the district magistrate of Patna in the 1970s.

He was appointed as Chief Secretary of Bihar in 1998 and then was handpicked by the Atal Bihari Vajpayee Government to be the first Chief Secretary of Jharkhand State in 2000. After retirement in 2002, he went on to serve as vice-chancellor of Nalanda Open University from 2003 to 2009. Dubey was the first officer to be appointed as Chairman of the Bihar Administrative Reforms Commission. On 11 June 2010, Dubey was appointed as an advisor to Jharkhand Governor MOH Farook. Dubey, as advisor to Jharkhand Governor during the President's rule, held portfolios of finance, industries, personnel, cabinet vigilance, mines and geology, energy, road construction, building construction, forest and environment, revenue and land reforms etc. Dubey is remembered as a no-nonsense, development-oriented officer, credited with initiating several schemes, including intensifying, expanding railway network in Jharkhand. He has worked with chief minister Nitish Kumar in various capacities. Dubey is the Working President of Mahavir Cancer Sansthan in Patna, Bihar.

== Fodder Scam ==
Lalu Prasad Yadav was the Chief Minister of undivided Bihar when the then finance commissioner V S Dubey found financial irregularities. On 19 January 1996, State Finance Secretary Dubey ordered investigations into cases of excessive withdrawals. He followed it up on 20 January 1996 by dispatching one of his secretaries to make an inquiry of the excessive withdrawals of money by the Animal Husbandry department from the Ranchi treasury. The inquiry uncovered criminal wrongdoing which is commonly known as Fodder Scam.
