= Fodder Scam =

Embezzlement scandal in Bihar state, India

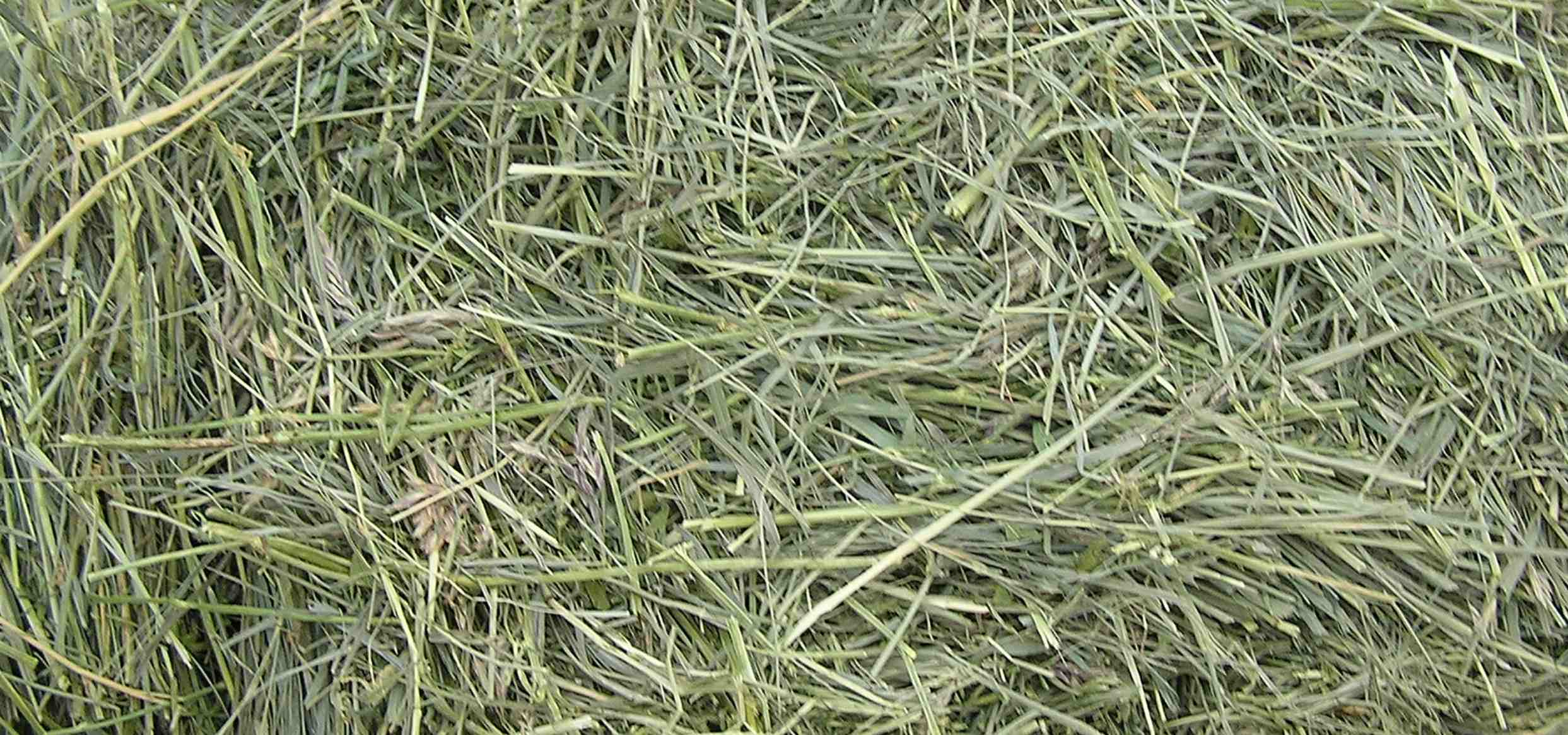
The Fodder Scam involved hundreds of millions of dollars in alleged fraudulent reimbursements from the treasury of Bihar state for fodder, medicines and husbandry supplies for non-existent livestock.

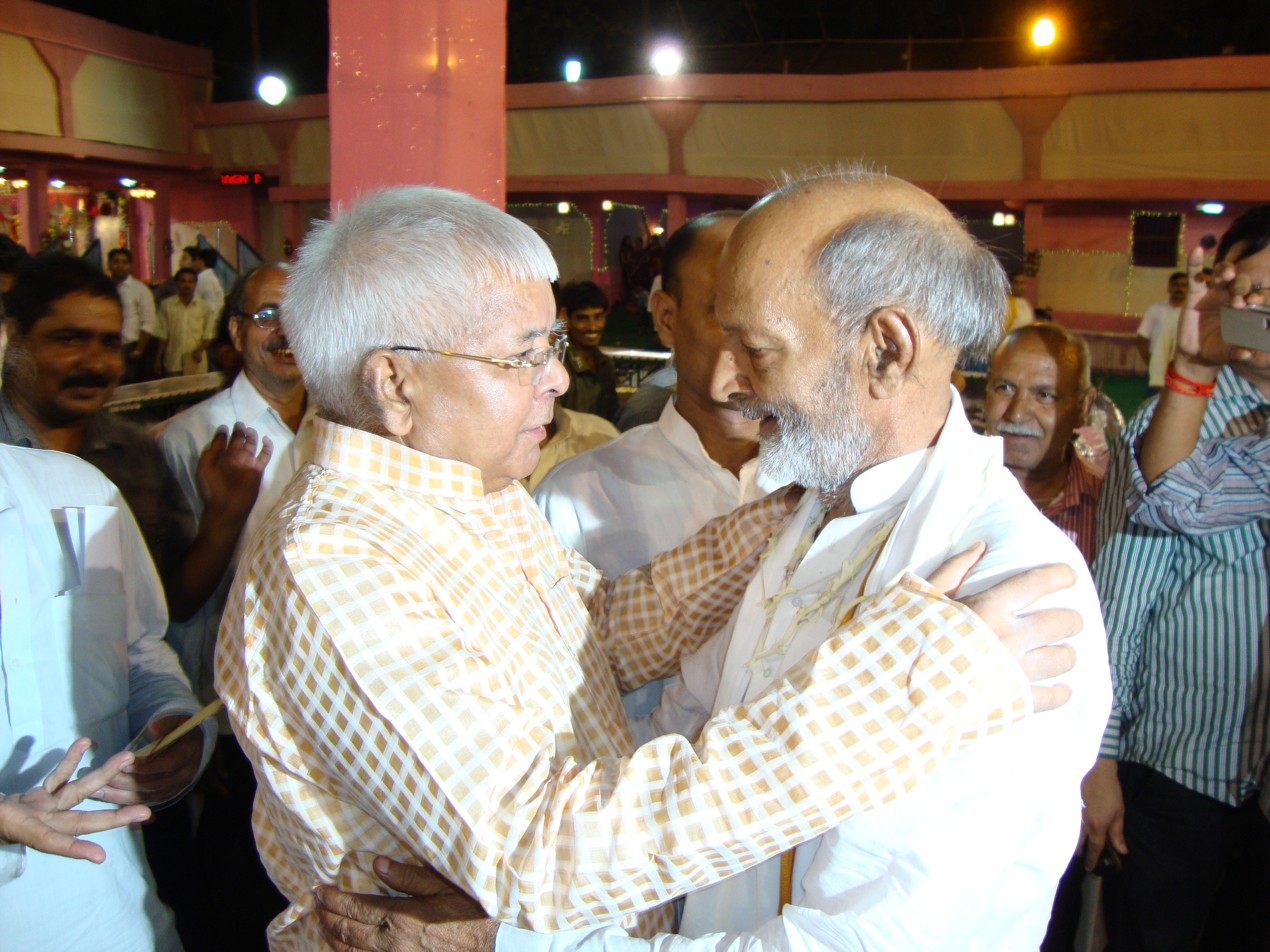
Lalu Prasad Yadav, on the left, is the highest-profile person convicted in the fodder scam.

The Fodder Scam was a corruption scandal that involved the embezzlement of about ₹940 crore (equivalent to ₹52 billion or US$540 million in 2026) from the government treasury of the east Indian state of Bihar. Among those implicated in the theft and arrested were then the chief minister of Bihar, Lalu Prasad Yadav, as well as former chief minister Jagannath Mishra. The scandal led to the end of Yadav's reign as chief minister. Dineshwar Prasad Sharma is also alleged to have received ₹300.60 crore from S. N. Sinha. On 23 December 2017, Yadav was convicted by a special CBI court, whereas Misra was acquitted.

The theft spanned many years, and allegedly involved numerous administrative and elected officials of Bihar State across multiple administrations of the Indian National Congress and the Janata Dal Parties. The corruption scheme involved the fabrication of "vast herds of fictitious livestock" for which fodder, medicines and animal husbandry equipment was supposedly procured. Although the scandal broke in 1996, the theft had been in progress, and increased in size, for over two decades. Besides the magnitude and duration of the theft, the scam was and continues to be covered in Indian media due to the extensive nexus among tenured bureaucrats, elected politicians and businesspeople that it revealed, and as an example of the Mafia Raj that has penetrated several state-run economic sectors in the country.

As of May 2013, the trial was completed in 44 out of a total of 53 cases. More than 500 accused have been convicted and awarded punishments by various courts.

== The scam ==
The scam had its origins in small-scale embezzlement by some government employees submitting false expense reports, which grew in magnitude and drew additional elements, such as politicians and businesses, over time, until a full-fledged mafia had formed. Jagannath Mishra, who served his first stint as the chief minister of Bihar in the mid-1970s, was the earliest chief minister to be accused of knowing involvement in the scam.

In February 1985, the then-comptroller and auditor general of India (CAG), T. N. Chaturvedi, took notice of delayed monthly account submissions by the Bihar state treasury and departments and wrote to the then Bihar chief minister, Chandrashekhar Singh, warning him that this could be indicative of temporary embezzlement. This initiated a continuous chain of closer scrutiny and warnings by principal accountants general (PAGs) and CAGs to the Bihar government across the tenures of multiple chief ministers (cutting across party affiliations), but the warnings were ignored in a manner that was suggestive of a pattern by extremely senior political and bureaucratic officials in the Bihar government. In 1992, Bidhu Bhushan Dvivedi, a police inspector with the state's anti-corruption vigilance unit, submitted a report outlining the fodder scam and likely involvement at the chief ministerial level to the director general of the same vigilance unit, G. Narayan. In alleged reprisal, Dvivedi was transferred out of the vigilance unit to a different branch of the administration, and then suspended from service. He was later to be a witness as corruption cases relating to the scam went to trial, and reinstated by order of the Jharkhand High Court.

== Exposure and investigation ==
The Bihar Veterinary Association (BVA) for the first time exposed Animal Husbandry Mafia in its 1985 press conference. In 1990 the BVA's executive committee was changed and Dr Dinneshwar Prasad Sharma was made the general secretary of the BVA. Once the mafia had control over the association, they went all guns blazing. At that point, Dr. Dharmendra Sinha and Dr. Biresh Prasad Sinha (the ex-office bearers of the BVA) started collecting and gathering information against this whole unethical practice of Mafia. They exposed this to all the political guns of Bihar. Among all these political guns was Sushil Kumar Modi, who initiated the whole episode after it was broken out by V S Dubey. The then charismatic yet "native" leader Yadav was the chief minister of undivided Bihar, where the then-finance commissioner Dubey stumbled upon the financial irregularities of a massive scale.

In 1992, then-Police Inspector Bidhu Bhushan Dvivedi, who was with the state Vigilance Department, submitted a detailed report highlighting the inclusion of high-profile persons including the chief minister and others. His reports were ignored and he was transferred to another department and was slapped with multiple frivolous inquiries and suspension. He was also threatened by bomb-hurling at his residence so as to stay away from participating in investigations. Although the scam was later picked by other authorities and persons of interests, Dvivedi was never given true credit for unearthing the biggest scam while being in a subordinate rank with true compassion and honesty.

On 19 January 1996, State Finance Secretary Dubey ordered district magistrates and deputy commissioners of all districts to go into cases of excessive withdrawals. He followed it up on 20 January 1996 by dispatching one of his additional secretaries to make an enquiry of the excessive drawls of money by Animal Husbandry department from Ranchi treasury. The enquiry revealed a whole scale loot of government money; drawn fraudulently by forged documents. Then on 27 January 1996, the deputy commissioner of West Singhbhum district, Amit Khare, acted on direction from Vijai Shankar Dubey to conduct a raid on the offices of the animal husbandry department in the town of Chaibasa in the district under his authority. The documents his team seized, and went public with, conclusively indicated large-scale embezzlement by an organised mafia of officials and business people. The news of fodder scam was first broken out by Indian journalist Ravi S Jha, who working with the Asian Age then in Calcutta, named the then-Bihar chief minister of having implicit involvement in the scam. Based on evidence he collected from Chaibasa, Jha not only found out widespread involvement of Bihar government machinery in the scam, but also even mentioned how earlier governments too were taking advantage of a shoddy system, where top government officials along with the ministers were flouting norms to make money illegally. Jha, an associate director of Public Affairs, is currently working with anti-corruption crusader and good governance promoter Rajeev Chandrasekhar, the Rajya Sabha Member of Parliament. Yadav ordered the constitution of a committee to probe the irregularities.

There were fears that state police, who were accountable to the state administration, and the probe committee would not investigate the case vigorously, and demands were raised to transfer the case to the Central Bureau of Investigation (CBI), which is under federal rather than state jurisdiction. Allegations were also made that several of the probe committee members were themselves complicit in the scam. A public interest litigation was filed with the Supreme Court of India, which led to the court's involvement; and based on the ultimate directions issued by the Supreme Court, in March 1996, the Patna High Court ordered that the case be handed over to the CBI.

An inquiry by the CBI began and, within days, the CBI filed a submission to the High Court that Bihar officials and legislators were blocking access to documents that could reveal the existence of a politician-official-business mafia nexus at work. Some legislators of the Bihar Legislative Council responded by claiming the court had been misinformed by the CBI and initiating a privilege motion to discuss possible action against senior figures in the regional headquarters of the CBI, which could proceed similar to a contempt of court proceeding and result in stalling the investigation or even prosecution of the named CBI officials.

However, U. N. Biswas, the regional CBI director, and the other officials tendered an unqualified apology to the Legislative Council, the privilege motion was dropped, and the CBI probe continued. As the investigation proceeded, the CBI unearthed linkages to the serving chief minister of Bihar, Lalu Prasad Yadav and, on 10 May 1997, made a formal request to the federally-appointed Governor of Bihar to prosecute Lalu (who is often referred by his first name in Indian media). On the same day, a businessman, Harish Khandelwal, who was one of the accused was found dead on train tracks with a note that stated that he was being coerced by the CBI to turn witness for the prosecution. The CBI rejected the charge and its local director, U. N. Biswas, kept the appeal to the governor in place. An income tax Investigation also blamed Lalu for the scam. On 8 May 2017, In a major setback for RJD leader Lalu Prasad Yadav, the Supreme Court has ordered separate trials in all four cases registered against him in the Rs. 1,000 crore fodder scam. Because the Supreme Court was hearing a CBI plea challenging the Jharkhand High Court's dropping of conspiracy charges against Yadav, the higher court asked the trial court to complete the trial in nine months.

== Path to prosecution ==
A few days of uncertainty followed the CBI's request to the state governor to prosecute the chief minister. The governor, A. R. Kidwai, was accountable to the federal government, and had already stated that he would need to be satisfied that strong evidence against Lalu existed before he would permit a formal indictment to proceed. The federal government, led by newly appointed prime minister Inder Kumar Gujral who had just succeeded the short-lived government of the previous prime minister H. D. Deve Gowda, consisted of a coalition that depended on support from federal legislators affiliated with Lalu for its survival. It was also unclear why the CBI had sought the governor's consent in the first place and, when the High Court demanded to know why it was being sought, the CBI stated that it was a "precautionary measure." The High Court, questioning the tactic, warned that it would allow some time for the permission to transpire, but if it sensed a delay, it would force a prosecution on its own authority.

On 17 June, the governor gave permission for Lalu and others to be prosecuted. Five senior Bihar government officials (Mahesh Prasad, science and technology secretary; K. Arumugam, labour secretary; Beck Julius, animal husbandry department secretary; Phoolchand Singh, former finance secretary; Ramraj Ram, former AHD director), the first four of whom were IAS officers, were taken into judicial custody on the same day. The CBI also began preparing a chargesheet against Lalu to be filed in a special court. Expecting to be accused and imprisoned, Lalu filed an anticipatory bail petition, which the CBI opposed in a deposition to the court, listing the evidence against Lalu. Also, on 21 June, fearing that evidence and documentation that might prove essential in further exposing the scam were being destroyed, the CBI conducted raids on Lalu's residence and those of some relatives suspected of complicity.

On 23 June, the CBI filed chargesheets against Lalu and 55 other co-accused, including Chandradeo Prasad Verma (a former union minister), Jagannath Mishra (former Bihar chief minister), two members of Lalu's cabinet (Bhola Ram Toofani and Vidya Sagar Nishad), three Bihar state assembly legislators (RK Rana of the Janata Dal, Jagdish Sharma of the Congress party, and Dhruv Bhagat of the Bharatiya Janata Party) and some current and former IAS officers (including the 4 who were already in custody). Mishra was granted anticipatory bail by the Bihar state High Court. Lalu's anticipatory bail petition, however, was rejected by the same court, and he appealed to the Supreme Court, which resulted in a final denial of bail on 29 July. On the same day, Bihar state police were ordered to arrest him. The next day, he was jailed. Later, the Bihar Director General of Police, SK Saxena, justified the one-day delay in arresting Lalu by stating in court that "any precipitate action would have led to police firing and killing of a large number of people."

== End of Lalu's chief ministership ==
As it became evident that Lalu would be engulfed in the scandal and its prosecution, demands for him to be removed from the chief ministership had gained momentum both from other parties, as well as within Lalu's own party, the Janata Dal. On 5 July, Lalu formally parted ways with the Janata Dal and formed his own party, the Rashtriya Janata Dal (or RJD), taking with him virtually all the Janata Dal legislators in the Bihar state assembly and winning a vote of confidence in the state assembly a few days later. The RJD continued to support the coalition federal government, however. With demands for his resignation continuing to mount, on 25 July, Lalu resigned from his position, but was able to install his wife, Rabri Devi as the new chief minister on the same day. On 28 July 1997, Rabri's new government won another vote of confidence in the Bihar legislature by 194–110, thanks to the Congress and Jharkhand Mukti Morcha parties voting in alignment with the RJD.

Lalu claimed he had been instrumental in helping HD Deve Gowda become the prime minister. However, there was press speculation that Gowda held a grudge against Lalu for insisting that Gowda step down when Gowda's fledgling government ran into internal coalition squabbles, and this motivated him to push CBI Director Joginder Singh for Lalu's prosecution. Much later, in 2008, Lalu also claimed that Deve Gowda confessed, and "wept and fainted," when Lalu confronted him on inciting the CBI to pursue the prosecution. Looking retrospectively, Lalu has said that the scam had a lasting negative impact on his political career, and may have ended his prospects to one day be prime minister of India.

There were reports that Joginder Singh had violated norms in keeping the new prime minister, IK Gujral, in the dark as he pursued the prosecution. Gujral's own new government also depended on Lalu for support in parliament, and Joginder Singh later alleged that Gujral had attempted to block the scam investigation from proceeding. On 30 June, the federal government issued orders to transfer Singh out of the CBI and into the Home Ministry as a Special Secretary, which was technically a promotion but also had the effect of removing him from the investigation. There was also an alleged follow-on move to transfer U. N. Biswas, the regional CBI director, which led to the High Court warning that it would act to disallow any such transfer.

== Prosecution ==
As the CBI discovered further evidence over the following years, it filed additional cases related to fraud and criminal conspiracy based on specific criminal acts of illegal withdrawals from the Bihar treasury. Most new cases filed after the division of Bihar state (into the new Bihar and Jharkhand states) in November 2000 were filed in the new Jharkhand High Court located in Ranchi, and several cases previously filed in the Patna High Court in Patna were also transferred to Ranchi. Of the 63 cases that the agency had filed by May 2007, the majority were being litigated in the Jharkhand High Court.

Lalu's initial chargesheet, filed by the CBI on 27 April 1996, was against case RC 20-A/96, relating to fraudulent withdrawals of ₹370 million (US$3.8 million) from the Chaibasa treasury of the (then) Bihar government, and was based on statutes including Indian Penal Code sections 420 (cheating) and 120(B) (criminal conspiracy), as well as section 13(2) of the Prevention of Corruption Act, 1988. Even though he had been jailed, he was kept in relative comfort at the Bihar Military Police guest house. After 135 days in judicial custody, Lalu was released on bail on 12 December 1997. The next year, on 28 October 1998, he was rearrested on a different conspiracy case relating to the fodder scam, at first being kept in the same guest house, but then being moved to Patna's Beur jail when the Supreme Court objected. After being granted bail, he was rearrested yet again in a disproportionate assets case on 5 April 2000. His wife and then Chief Minister Rabri Devi was also asked to surrender on that date, but then immediately granted bail. This stint in prison lasted 11 days for Lalu, followed by one day's imprisonment in another fodder scam case on 28 November 2000.

Jagannath Mishra had been permitted bail in June 1997, and avoided judicial remand when Lalu was first detained in July 1997. However, he was taken into custody on 16 September of the same year. He was freed on bail on 13 October but then remanded again, at the same time as Lalu, on 28 October 1998, when he was kept at the same guest house as Lalu, and later shifted to Beur jail along with him. Mishra was freed on bail on 18 December, but then rearrested in a different fodder scam case on 7 June 2000.

Due to the multiplicity of cases, Lalu Yadav, Jagannath Mishra, and the other accused have been remanded several times in the years since 2000. In 2007, 58 former officials and suppliers were convicted, and given terms of 5 to 6 years each. As of May 2007, about 200 people had been punished with jail terms of between 2 and 7 years. A 2005 litigation of one of the cases (RC 68-A/96) in the Jharkhand High Court involved over 20 truckloads of documents.

On 1 March 2012, nearly 16 years after CBI was handled over the case, a special CBI court in Patna framed charges against Lalu Prasad Yadav and Jagannath Mishra along with 32 other accused. Of the total 44 accused, six have died, two have turned approvers, while two others are still evading arrest. The CBI had chargesheeted them in this case on 3 March 2003. The court said that the trial would begin soon.

=== Disproportionate assets case ===
A disproportionate assets (DA) case was filed against Lalu in August 1998. The Income Tax claimed that Lalu had amassed wealth of Rs. 4.6 million out of the government treasury. Lalu and Rabri were chargesheeted in April 2000 and charges were framed by the court on 9 June 2000. Finally, the couple was acquitted on 18 December 2006 by a special CBI court.

CBI didn't appeal against this verdict in high court. However, Government of Bihar challenged the verdict (of CBI court) in Patna High Court and the high court accepted the plea. This verdict of Patna High Court was challenged by Lalu and the CBI in SC. The SC in April 2010 declared that the Government of Bihar has no right to file appeal against acquittal of the accused even in cases where the CBI refuses to challenge the trial court or High Court's verdict favouring the accused.

In yet another twist in the case, Government of Chhattisgarh in an unrelated case requested the Supreme Court to review its verdict in Lalu Yadav Disproportionate assets case. The Government of Chhattisgarh was aggrieved by Supreme Court verdict in DA case when it was trying to challenge the acquittal of former chief minister Ajit Jogi's son Amit Jogi in a murder case. After the trial court in Chhattisgarh acquitted Amit Jogi in May 2007, for over three-and-a-half years, the CBI again (similar to Lalu's DA case) did not file any appeal. Chhattisgarh High Court rejected Government of Chhattisgarh's appeal due to Supreme Court's order (which is binding on all) in Lalu Disproportionate assets case. On 19 March 2012, the Supreme Court agreed to review its own decision in Lalu's Disproportionate assets case. However, in May 2012, Supreme Court dismissed the Review Petition holding that the earlier Judgment did not suffer from any mistake apparent on the face of the record warranting any review. On 6 January 2018, the CBI Court has awarded Lalu a three-and-a-half-year jail term and five-lakh fine.

== Convictions ==
As of May 2013, the trial has completed in 44 cases out of a total of 53 cases. More than 500 accused have been convicted and awarded punishments by various courts. Some of the most prominent convicts include former CM of Bihar Lalu Prasad, former Member of Parliament Rabindra Kumar Rana and former Member of Legislative Assembly Dhruv Bhagat.

On 30 September 2013, a Special CBI Court in Ranchi convicted Lalu Prasad Yadav and Jagannath Mishra along with 44 others in the case. Thirty-seven people were taken into judicial custody. The court has announced a sentence of five years and four years for Lalu and Jagannath Mishra, respectively.

== Sentence ==
Former Bihar chief minister and Rashtriya Janata Dal president Lalu Prasad was sentenced to five years in jail in a fodder scam case by a special CBI court on 3 October 2013. The court of Pravas Kumar Singh announced the quantum of punishment via video conference due to security reasons. Prasad has also been slapped with a fine of Rs 2.5 million. The 65-year-old leader has lost his Lok Sabha seat and is also barred from contesting election for six years following the sentencing due to an earlier Supreme Court order.

Another former Bihar chief minister, Jagannath Mishra, has been handed a 4-year sentence.

== Impact ==
Since it broke into public light, the fodder scam has become symbolic of bureaucratic corruption and the criminalisation of politics in India generally, and in Bihar in particular. It has been called a symptom of a "deep and chronic malady afflicting the Bihar government and quite a few other state governments as well." In the Indian parliament, it was cited as an important indicator of the deep inroads made by Mafia Raj in the politics and economics of the country. Reference has also been made to the anarchic nature of governance (the "withering away of the state") that occurs when a mafia develops in a state-controlled sector of the economy.

The investigation and prosecution in the Fodder Scam has said to be guided by the political consideration and motive. For making a strong against case against the politicians and the bureaucrats, CBI launched the prosecution against majority of the officials including lower level staffs, which did not have any nexus with the scam. Many employees of the department were suspended and sentenced by the Courts, against whom there were evidence or direct involvement in the scam. The rationale given in the judgement for such penalty was their posting or deputation in the offices from where the scams were conducted, without any direct involvement in the scams. Due to this the family members of many employees were left without any option for earning. The trail which was started in 1996 is still in process and the fate of many innocent people has been hanging without a certainty.

Lalu Prasad Yadav is the only person on whom the Lok Sabha debated for a complete session as the official agenda.

As of now, Lalu Prasad Yadav has been awarded a three-and-a-half-year jail term and a five-lakh fine by the CBI court on 6 January 2018.

On 24 January 2018 the court passed judgement for the third case and has awarded a five-year jail term and imposed a fine of ₹10,00,000/- (INR One Million) on Lalu Prasad Yadav. The total jail term in the three judgement sentences amount to 13½ years.

== In popular culture ==
In 2021, Indian web series Maharani was loosely based on this scam and subsequently Rabri Devi was made the Chief Minister of Bihar.

== See also ==
- Corruption in India
- List of political scandals in India

== Sources ==
- "Nitish will join hands with BJP again, claims Sushil Kumar Modi". FirstPost. 20 February 2014. Archived from the original on 2 March 2014.
