= Ram Das Rai =

Indian politician

MLA, Bihar Legislative Assembly
- In office 1985–1990
- Preceded by: Prabhunath Singh
- Succeeded by: Rajiv Pratap Rudy
- Constituency: Taraiya
- In office 1995–2010
- Preceded by: Rajiv Pratap Rudy
- Succeeded by: Janak Singh
- Constituency: Taraiya

Personal details
- Born: Taraiya ,Saran district, Bihar
- Died: 3 September 2010 New Delhi, India
- Party: Rashtriya Janata Dal; Janata Dal; Bharatiya Janata Party
- Children: 4 daughters and 1 son
- Parent: Churaman Rai
- Education: B.A (Bihar University)
- Occupation: Politician

Ram Das Rai was an Indian politician. He was elected as a member of Bihar Legislative Assembly from Taraiya constituency in Saran district, Bihar.

== Political life ==
Rai started his political life from BJS in 1972 but lost to Prabhunath Singh and won four times from Taraiya constituency.

== Death ==
Rai died on 3 September 2010 in New Delhi, India.

== See also ==
- Taraiya Assembly constituency
