= Mudrika Prasad Rai =

Indian politician

Member of Bihar Legislative Assembly
- In office 2015–2020
- Preceded by: Janak Singh
- Succeeded by: Janak Singh
- Constituency: Taraiya

Personal details
- Born: Mudrika Prasad Rai; 5 June 1964 (age 62) Village- Chakhan, Post. Shamkauria, PS. Ishuapur, Dist-Saran district, Bihar
- Party: Rashtriya Janata Dal
- Education: Bachelor of Science (Civil)
- Profession: Politician social worker agriculturist

Mudrika Prasad Rai or Mudrika Yadav was an Indian politician. He was elected to the Bihar Legislative Assembly from Taraiya (2015 Member of Bihar Legislative Assembly) as a member of the Rashtriya Janata Dal.
