= Lal Babu Rai =

Indian politician

Member of Parliament, Lok Sabha
- In office 1989-1996
- Preceded by: Lalu Prasad Yadav
- Succeeded by: Rajiv Pratap Rudy
- Constituency: Chapra, Bihar

Personal details
- Born: 29 July 1946 (age 79) Chirand, Saran district, Bihar, British India
- Party: Janata Dal
- Spouse: Sharda Devi
- Children: 4 Rita Singh, Dilip kumar (former, deceased), Pradeep kumar, Anil kumar

Lal Babu Rai (born 1946) is an Indian politician. Before entering politics he was a lawyer in Patna high court. He began his political career contesting from Chapra assembly seat from Jan sangh ticket in 1975. He was later elected to the Lok Sabha, the lower house of the Parliament of India from Chapra, Bihar as a member of the Janata Dal, in 1990 by-poll and 1991 general election.
