= Taraiya Assembly constituency =

Coordinates: 26°04′07″N 84°53′13″E

Taraiya
- Constituency No. 116 for the Bihar Legislative Assembly

Constituency details
- Country: India
- Region: East India
- State: Bihar
- District: Saran
- Established: 1967
- Total electors: 298,532

Member of Legislative Assembly
- 18th Bihar Legislative Assembly
- Incumbent Janak Singh
- Party: BJP
- Alliance: NDA
- Elected year: 2025

Taraiya Assembly constituency is an assembly constituency in Saran district in the Indian state of Bihar. Taraiya city has one of the tallest Shiva temple in Bihar. The Vidhan Sabha constituency consists of neighboring blocks such as Isuapur, and Mashrakh Panapur.

== Overview ==
As per Delimitation of Parliamentary and Assembly constituencies Order, 2008, No. 116 Taraiya Assembly constituency is composed of the following:Taraiya, Panapur and Ishuapur community development blocks. Panchayat are following: Dumari, Chanchaliya, Madhopur, Chainpur etc.

Taraiya Assembly constituency is part of No. 19 Maharajganj (Lok Sabha constituency). It was earlier part of Chapra (Lok Sabha constituency).

== Members of the Legislative Assembly ==
Year	Name	Party
1967	Dharam Nath Singh	Samyukta Socialist Party
1969	Prabu Narayan Singh	Janata Party
1972	Prabhunath Singh	Indian National Congress
1977	Dharam Nath Singh	Janata Party
1980	Prabhunath Singh	Indian National Congress
1985	Ram Das Rai	Bharatiya Janata Party
1990	Rajiv Pratap Rudy	Janata Dal
1995	Ram Das Rai	Janata Dal
2000	Ram Das Rai	Rashtriya Janata Dal
2005	Janak Singh	Lok Janshakti Party
2005	Ram Das Rai	Rashtriya Janata Dal
2010	Janak Singh	Bharatiya Janata Party
2015	Mudrika Prasad Rai	Rashtriya Janata Dal
2020	Janak Singh	Bharatiya Janata Party
2025	Janak Singh	Bharatiya Janata Party

== Election results ==
=== 2025 ===
2025 Bihar Legislative Assembly election: Taraiya
Party	Candidate	Votes	%	±%
BJP	Janak Singh	85,564	44.21	+12.06
RJD	shailendra pratap singh	84,235	43.52	+18.17
JSP	Satendra Sahni	5,086	2.63	
Independent	Mumtaj Ansari	2,748	1.42	
Independent	Mithilesh Kumar	2,663	1.38	−4.06
Independent	Vijesh Ray	2,621	1.35	
BSP	Braj Bihari Singh	1,875	0.97	−0.08
AAP	Amit Kumar Singh	1,851	0.96	
NOTA	None of the above	1,724	0.89	+0.15
Majority		1,329	0.69	−6.11
Turnout		193,538	64.83	+9.93
BJP hold		Swing	NDA	

=== 2020 ===
2020 Bihar Legislative Assembly election: Taraiya
Party	Candidate	Votes	%	±%
BJP	Janak Singh	53,430	32.15	−1.55
RJD	Sipahi Lal Mahto	42,123	25.35	−22.53
Independent	Sudhir Kumar Singh	15,425	9.28	
Independent	Shailendra Pratap	13,995	8.42	
Independent	Saroj Kumar Giri	11,550	6.95	
Independent	Mithilesh Kumar	9,039	5.44	
Independent	Mudrika Prasad Roy	7,289	4.39	
Independent	Satrudhan Singh	4,510	2.71	
BSP	Shaukat Ali	1,753	1.05	
NOTA	None of the above	1,229	0.74	−1.98
Majority		11,307	6.8	−7.38
Turnout		166,185	54.9	+3.09
BJP gain from RJD		Swing		

=== 2015 ===
2015 Bihar Legislative Assembly election: Taraiya
Party	Candidate	Votes	%	±%
RJD	Mudrika Prasad Roy	69,012	47.88	
BJP	Janak Singh	48,572	33.7	
Independent	Braj Bihari Singh	3,980	2.76	
Independent	Nazare Imam Khan	3,747	2.6	
Independent	Hemant Kumar Singh	3,195	2.22	
CPI(M)	Geeta Sagar Ram	2,840	1.97	
CPI(ML)L	Sabha Ray	2,069	1.44	
Public Mission Party	Satyendra Kumar Singh	1,929	1.34	
ABHM	Abhimanyu Kumar "Manish"	1,824	1.27	
NOTA	None of the above	3,921	2.72	
Majority		20,440	14.18	
Turnout		144,128	51.81	
Bhartiya New Sanskar Krantikari Party	Lalan Sah	611	0.42	
