= Dumari, Saran district =

Dumari Village
- Village
- Location in Bihar, India
- Coordinates: 26°04′07″N 84°53′13″E
- Country: India
- State: Bihar
- District: Saran district
- Block/Police Station: Taraiya
- Gram Panchayat: Dumari Village

Government
  - Chief Minister: Nitish Kumar (JD(U))
  - MP: Janardan Singh Sigriwal(BJP)

Area
  - Total: 1.13 km^{2} (0.44 sq mi)

Population (2011)
  - Total: 1,724
  - Density: 1,530/km^{2} (3,950/sq mi)

Languages
  - Local: Bhojpuri; Hindi
- Time zone: UTC+5:30 (IST)
- PIN: 841424
- Lok Sabha constituency: Maharajganj (Saran)
- Vidhan Sabha constituency: Taraiya
- Website: saran.bih.nic.in

Dumari is a village in Taraiya block of Saran district in Bihar, India. Located in a rural area of Saran district, it is one of the 79 villages of Taraiya block. The village has 321 homes.

== Geography ==
Dumari is a medium-sized village situated in the northernmost part of the Saran (Chhapra) district with a distance of about 77 km from the state capital, Patna. It is in a north-east direction of Taraiya Block (Police Station) with a distance of about 3 km. A famous temple of Lord Shiva (Shiv Mandir) and Brahm Baba (made by the late Ramadhar Singh) is in Dumari Village. The nearest major road at the distance of less than 1 km is Sohagara-Nainijor-Guthani Road. The nearest river to this village, at a distance of about 3 km, is Gandak river.

== Demographics ==
According to the 2011 India census, Dumari's population was 1,724. Out of this, 903 are male and 821 are female. The village has 270 children in the age bracket of 0–6 years. Among them, 155 are boys and 115 are girls.

== Employment, culture, society and its people ==
The local languages are Bhojpuri and Hindi as well. There are people of various castes like Rajput, Baitha (Dhobi), Shav etc. Despite such a great diversity, there is a common thread linking the people of this village because the 'fraternity and brotherhood' among these people are perfect. There are some temples of Hindu deities like Goddesses Maa Kali and Chanki, Lord Hanuman and Lord Shiva. This village is known for farmers. The number of employed people of Dumari village is more than 150 working in private sectors including their own businesses and also working in Indian and international companies.

== Nearest railway stations and towns ==
Tha nearest railway station is Shamkouriya and Mashrakh railway station.

Chhapra is the nearest town.
