= Rajiv Pratap Rudy =

Indian politician and commercial pilot (born 1962)

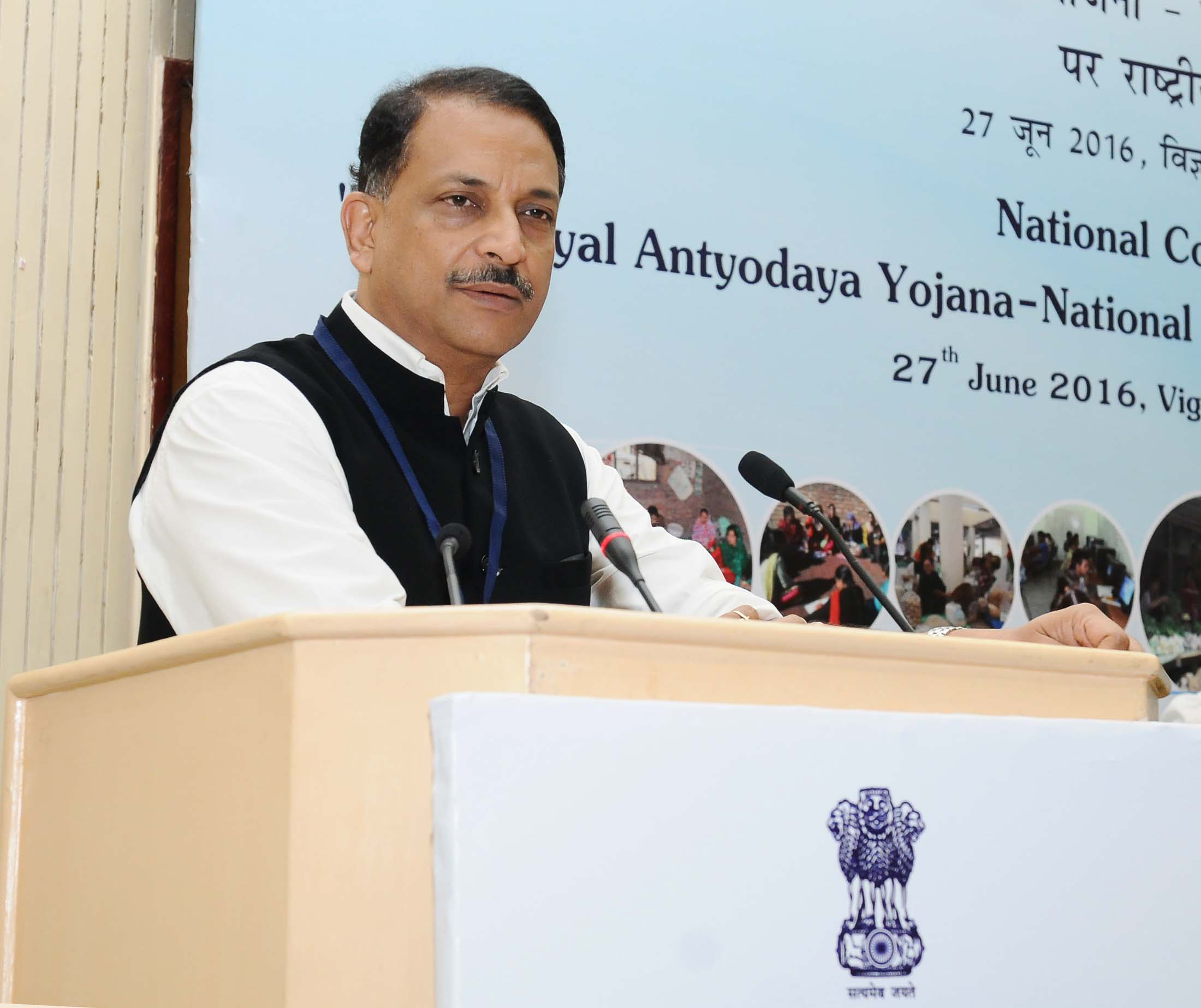
- Rudy in 2016

Union Minister of State
- In office 9 November 2014 – 31 August 2017
- Prime Minister: Narendra Modi
- Ministry: Term
- Skill Development & Entrepreneurship (Independent Charge): 9 November 2014 - 31 August 2017
- Parliamentary Affairs: 9 November 2014 - 5 July 2016
- In office 1 September 2002 – 22 May 2004
- Prime Minister: Atal Bihari Vajpayee
- Ministry: Term
- Civil Aviation (Independent Charge): 24 May 2003 - 22 May 2004
- Commerce & Industry: 1 September 2002 - 24 May 2003

Member of Parliament, Lok Sabha
- Incumbent
- Assumed office 16 May 2014
- Preceded by: Lalu Prasad Yadav
- Constituency: Saran, Bihar
- In office 6 October 1999 – 17 May 2004
- Preceded by: Heera Lal Rai
- Succeeded by: Lalu Prasad Yadav
- Constituency: Chapra, Bihar
- In office 10 May 1996 – 4 December 1997
- Preceded by: Lal Babu Rai
- Succeeded by: Heera Lal Rai
- Constituency: Chapra, Bihar

Member of Parliament, Rajya Sabha
- In office 4 July 2008 – 16 May 2014
- Preceded by: Jai Narain Prasad Nishad
- Succeeded by: Pavan Varma
- Constituency: Bihar

Member of Bihar Legislative Assembly
- In office 1990–1995
- Preceded by: Ram Das Rai
- Succeeded by: Ram Das Rai
- Constituency: Taraiya

Personal details
- Born: 30 March 1962 (age 64) Amnour, Bihar, India
- Party: Bharatiya Janata Party (since 1999)
- Other political affiliations: Bihar People's Party (1995-1999); Janata Dal
- Spouse: Neelam Pratap (m. 1991)
- Children: 2
- Education: Panjab University

Rajiv Pratap Rudy (born 30 March 1962) is an Indian politician from Bihar. He is a four-time Member of Parliament representing Bharatiya Janata Party. In 2024, he won from Saran (Lok Sabha constituency) in Bihar. Earlier, he won three times in 1996, 1999 and 2014 from Chapra Assembly Constituency, which later became Saran. He was also an MLA from Taraiya Assembly Constituency representing Janata Dal in 1990. He is also a licensed pilot.

== Early life ==
Rajiv Pratap Rudy was born to Vishwanath Singh and Prabha Singh on 30 March 1962 in Patna, Bihar. His ancestral village is Amnour, Saran, Bihar. Rudy did his schooling from St. Michael's High School, Patna. Later, he completed his pre-university from DAV College, Chandigarh. He completed his B.A. (Hons.) in Economics at Government College, Chandigarh. Later he also got a degree in Law from Panjab University in 1985 and studied post-graduation in Economics from Magadh University in 1987.

Prior to joining politics, he was a lecturer of Economics in A.N. College, Patna. He was into student politics at Panjab University at Chandigarh when studying at Government College.

== Personal life ==
Rudy married Neelam Pratap on 9 March 1991 at the age of 29. They have two daughters. Elder daughter, Avshreya Rudy (born 1993), is a lawyer and also a polo player. His younger daughter, Atisha Pratap Singh (born 2000), is a kuchipudi dancer.

== Political career ==
Rudy entered politics in 1989 as a campaign manager of Harmohan Dhawan, who contested from the Chandigarh Lok Sabha constituency. He was actively associated with former prime minister Chandra Shekhar.

Rudy was first elected in 1990 as a Member of the Bihar Legislative Assembly on Janata Dal ticket from Taraiya at the young age of 28.

=== As Member of Parliament ===
Rudy was elected to the Lok Sabha winning the 1996 Indian General Election in Bihar as a candidate of the BJP from Chapra (Lok Sabha constituency). He won the 1999 Indian General Election in Bihar and was re–elected for a second term of Lok Sabha on BJP ticket.

He then served as the Minister of State for Commerce, Trade & Industry and subsequently became Civil Aviation Minister with independent charge in the National Democratic Alliance government led by Atal Bihari Vajpayee in 2001.

Rudy had earlier held the post of National Vice President of the Bharatiya Janata Yuva Morcha. He was the General Secretary and member of the BJP National Executive.

Rudy lost to Lalu Prasad in 2004 General elections in Chapra (Lok Sabha constituency). He was then elected to Rajya Sabha from Bihar in 2010. He contested the 2014 Lok Sabha Elections from Saran (Lok Sabha constituency) and defeated former Chief Minister of Bihar, Rabri Devi. following which he was sworn-in as Minister of State on 9 November 2014 and got Minister of State (Independent Charge) of Skill Development & Entrepreneurship.

In 2014, Rudy became the Minister of State (Independent Charge) for Skill Development and Entrepreneurship in Narendra Modi's government. Simultaneously he also shared Parliamentary Affairs department jointly with Minister of State, Mukhtar Abbas Naqvi. Rudy was a General Secretary of Bharatiya Janata Party, a position relinquished soon after he joined the government. Rudy is a trained pilot and holds a commercial pilot's license. He is featured in the Limca Book of Records as the only parliamentarian to fly a commercial aircraft, an Airbus-320 of Indigo airlines.

== Controversies ==
During that tenure as Civil Aviation Minister, Rudy was in controversy of non-payment of his bills at Taj Exotica Resort & Spa, Goa, which he had to later pay. In October 2015, Rajiv Pratap Rudy was in a controversy over sharing on Twitter a screenshot of Pakistan's daily Dawn website carrying Nitish Kumar's ad of vote appeal during 2015 Bihar Legislative Assembly election, prompting JD (U) to launch a sharp attack on him and seek his immediate sacking. He submitted his resignation from the cabinet on 31 August 2017 prior to imminent reshuffle on 2 September 2017.

In May 2021, Rajiv Pratap Rudy was criticized when 30 unused ambulances were found parked at his Amnour Vishw-Prabha community centre, even when Bihar was struggling under second wave of COVID-19 pandemic. These ambulances were purchased using funds from the Members of Parliament Local Area Development Scheme (MPLADS). Jan Adhikar Party chief Pappu Yadav raided that community centre run by Rudy.

Lok Sabha
| Preceded by Lal Babu Rai | Member of Parliament for Chapra; 1996 – 1998 | Succeeded by Heera Lal Rai |
| Preceded by Heera Lal Rai | Member of Parliament for Chapra; 1999 – 2004 | Succeeded by Lalu Prasad Yadav |
| Preceded by Lalu Prasad Yadav | Member of Parliament for Saran; 2014 – Present | Incumbent |
Political offices
| Preceded by Ministry Created | Minister of Skill Development and Entrepreneurship; 26 May 2014 – 3 September 2017; Minister of State (Independent Charge) | Succeeded by Dharmendra Pradhan |
