= Janak Singh (Bihar politician) =

Indian politician

Member of Bihar Legislative Assembly
- Incumbent
- Assumed office November 2020
- Chief Minister: Samrat Choudhary
- Preceded by: Mudrika Prasad Rai
- Constituency: Taraiya

Personal details
- Born: 15 December 1960 (age 65)
- Party: Bharatiya Janata Party
- Parent: Khedaran Singh
- Occupation: MLA
- Profession: Social Work, Agriculture, Dairy & Other

Janak Singh is an Indian politician, currently a member of Bhartiya Janata Party and Member Of Legislative Assembly from Taraiya (Vidhan Sabha constituency).

He was made the deputy Chief Secretary of BJP in Bihar. He has been involved with RSS and ABVP from early age.

He inaugurated the health fair at Taraiya referral hospital. Recently he was also involved in a minor controversy.
