= Lalu Prasad Yadav =

20th chief minister of Bihar

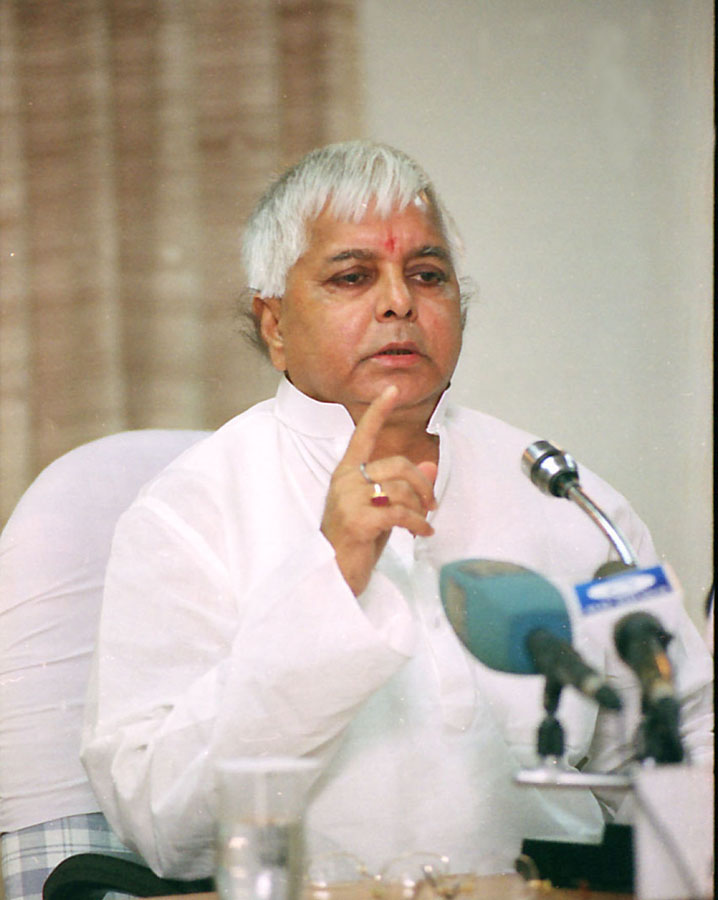
- Lalu as Union Minister of Railways, addressing in New Delhi on 12 September 2004

30th Union Minister of Railways
- In office 24 May 2004 – 23 May 2009
- Prime Minister: Manmohan Singh
- Preceded by: Nitish Kumar
- Succeeded by: Mamata Banerjee

President of the Rashtriya Janata Dal
- Incumbent
- Assumed office 5 July 1997
- Preceded by: office established
- Succeeded by: Tejashwi Yadav

20th Chief Minister of Bihar
- In office 4 April 1995 – 25 July 1997
- Governor: A. R. Kidwai
- Preceded by: President's rule
- Succeeded by: Rabri Devi
- In office 10 March 1990 – 28 March 1995
- Governor: Mohammad Yunus Saleem
- Preceded by: Jagannath Mishra
- Succeeded by: President's rule

Member of Parliament, Lok Sabha
- In office 22 May 2009 – 3 October 2013
- Preceded by: constituency established
- Succeeded by: Rajiv Pratap Rudy
- Constituency: Saran, Bihar
- In office 24 May 2004 – 22 May 2009
- Preceded by: Rajiv Pratap Rudy
- Succeeded by: constituency abolished
- Constituency: Chhapra, Bihar
- In office 10 March 1998 – 26 April 1999
- Preceded by: Sharad Yadav
- Succeeded by: Sharad Yadav
- Constituency: Madhepura
- In office 2 December 1989 – 10 March 1990
- Preceded by: Rambahadur Singh
- Succeeded by: Lal Babu Rai
- Constituency: Chhapra, Bihar
- In office 23 March 1977 – 22 August 1979
- Preceded by: Ramshekhar Prasad Singh
- Succeeded by: Satya Deo Singh
- Constituency: Chhapra, Bihar

Member of Parliament, Rajya Sabha
- In office 10 April 2002 – 13 May 2004
- Constituency: Bihar

12th Leader of the Opposition Bihar Legislative Assembly
- In office 18 March 1989 – 7 December 1989
- Preceded by: Karpoori Thakur
- Succeeded by: Anup Lal Yadav

Member of Bihar Legislative Assembly
- In office 3 March 2000 – 10 April 2002
- Preceded by: Vijay Singh Yadav
- Succeeded by: Rama Nand Yadav
- Constituency: Danapur
- In office 4 April 1995 – 10 March 1998
- Preceded by: Uday Narayan Rai
- Succeeded by: Rajgir Choudhary
- Constituency: Raghopur
- In office 8 June 1980 – 2 December 1989
- Preceded by: Ram Sundar Das
- Succeeded by: Raj Kumar Roy
- Constituency: Sonpur

Member of Bihar Legislative Council
- In office 7 May 1990 – 4 April 1995
- Constituency: elected by Legislative assembly member's

President of Janata Dal
- In office 1996-1997

Personal details
- Born: 11 June 1948 (age 78) Phulwariya, Bihar, India
- Party: Rashtriya Janata Dal
- Other political affiliations: Janata Dal
- Spouse: Rabri Devi (m. 1973)
- Relations: Tej Pratap Singh Yadav (son-in-law); Chiranjeev Rao (son-in-law); Sadhu Yadav (brother-in-law)
- Children: 9 (including Tejashwi Yadav, Tej Pratap Yadav and Misa Bharti)
- Parents: Kundan Rai (father); Marachhiya Devi (mother)
- Education: Patna University (B.A., LLB)
- Website: rjd.co.in/shri-lalu-prasad/

Lalu Prasad Yadav (born 11 June 1948 (Note: It was given as official date by his mother.)) is an Indian politician who served as the chief minister of Bihar from 1990 to 1997, with a brief interruption in 1995, and as the union minister for Railways from 2004 to 2009. He is the founding president of the Rashtriya Janata Dal (RJD), a prominent political party in Bihar. He is also a former member of Parliament (MP) of the Lok Sabha and Rajya Sabha.

His political rise in the 1990s marked a significant shift in Bihar's social and political landscape.

He entered politics at Patna University as a student leader and, in 1977, was elected as one of the youngest members of the Lok Sabha for the Bharatiya Lok Dal of the Janata Alliance. He became the chief minister of Bihar in 1990. His party came to power in the 2015 Bihar Legislative Assembly election in coalition with Nitish Kumar of JD(U). However, the coalition ended when Nitish resigned and the RJD was ousted, becoming the opposition party.

In the 2020 Bihar Legislative Assembly election, the RJD remained the single largest party in Bihar. Later, after the JD(U) rejoined the Mahagathbandhan (MGB) in 2022, the RJD headed the government, but this alliance was short-lived as the JD(U) eventually returned to the NDA.

Lalu was convicted in the Fodder Scam and was serving a term until 17 April 2021, when he was granted bail by the High Court. He is disqualified from Office under the Section 8(3) of the Representation of the People Act till 6 years after his release. He is husband of former chief minister Rabri Devi and father of Tejaswini Yadav & Tej Pratap Yadav.

== Early life and education ==
Lalu Prasad Yadav, the fifth of six sons born to Kundan Rai and Marachhiya Devi, was born on 11 June 1948, in Phulwaria village, situated along the Gopalganj-Kushinagar highway (NH-27) in Gopalganj district of Bihar. He started his education at a local middle school before moving to Patna with his older brother, Mukund Rai, who enrolled him in an upper primary school in Sheikhpura. After finishing his primary education there, he was enrolled in the Government Middle School located on the Bihar Military Police (BMP) campus, which was next to their quarters at the veterinary college campus.

=== Siblings ===
The list of siblings is in order of age.

1. Mangru Rai (eldest)
2. Gulab Rai
3. Mukund Rai
4. Mahavir Rai
5. Gangotri Devi (lone sister)
6. Lalu Prasad Yadav (himself only alive)
7. Sukhdeo Rai (youngest)

His father died after he completed his matriculation in 1965 from Miller High School in Patna, where he was also interested in football. He changed its name to Devipad Choudhary Shaheed Smarak (Miller) Ucchya Madhyamik Vidyalaya in honour of Devipad Choudhary, who was a freedom fighter and student of the same school. He was a NCC cadet there. According to his Lok Sabha affidavit, he obtained his I.A. (Arts) from B.N. College of Patna University the following year. However, it is noteworthy that B.N. College does not offer this course, and the program typically spans two years, yet he claims to have completed it in the same year he got enrolled there. After earning his Bachelor of Arts degree, he worked as a clerk at Bihar Veterinary College in Patna, where his eldest brother was employed as a peon. During his time there, he served as the general secretary of the Patna University Students' Union from 1970 to 1971 and later became its president from 1973 to 1974. He later earned his L.L.B. degree from Patna Law College in 1976. He turned down Patna University's Honorary Doctorate in 2004.

Lalu Prasad Yadav asserts that he belongs to the Yadav caste;

== Personal life and family ==
Lalu Prasad Yadav married Rabri Devi on 1 June 1973, in an arranged marriage, and they went on to have seven daughters and two sons.

The list of siblings is ordered by age:

1. Misa Bharti
2. Rohini Acharya – married to Samaresh Singh
3. Chanda Singh – married to Vikram Singh in 2006, a pilot in Indian Airlines
4. Ragini Yadav – married to Rahul Yadav, Samajwadi Party leader from Sarfabad in Noida
5. Hema Yadav – married to Vineet Yadav
6. Anushka Rao (Dhannu) – married to Chiranjeev Rao (son of Ajay Singh Yadav)
7. Tej Pratap Yadav – former Environment, Forest and Climate Change Minister of Bihar
8. Rajlaxmi Singh Yadav – married to Tej Pratap Singh Yadav
9. Tejashwi Yadav – former Deputy Chief Minister of Bihar.

== Political career ==
=== 1970–1990: Student leader and youngest MP ===
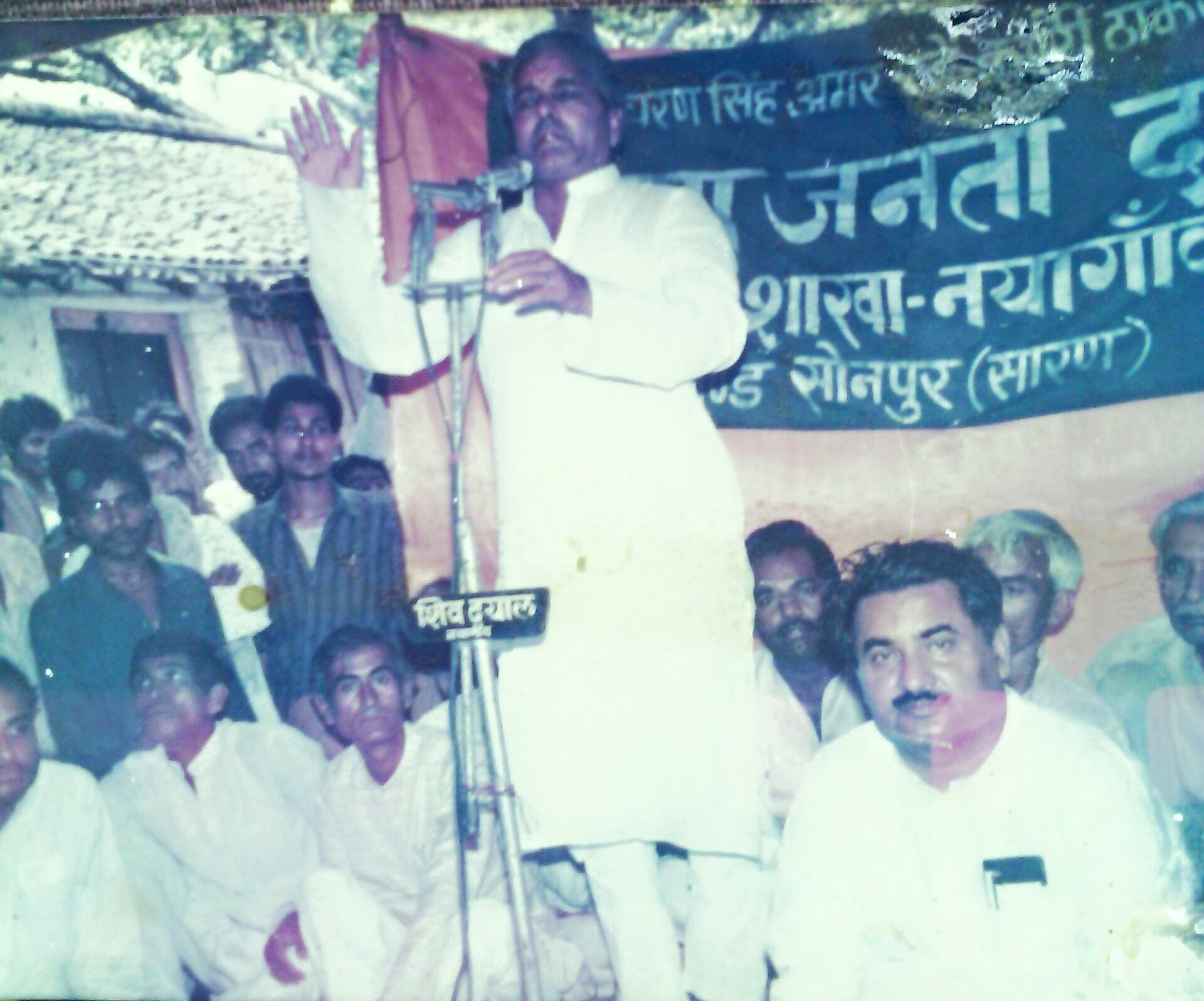
Lalu Prasad addressing Yuva Janata Dal in Nayagaon, Sonpur in 1988

In 1970, Lalu entered student politics as the general secretary of the Patna University Students' Union (PUSU), becoming its president in 1973, eventually joining Jai Prakash Narayan's Bihar Movement in 1974 where he became sufficiently close to the Janata Party (JP) leaders to become the winning candidate in the 1977 Lok Sabha election from Chapra at the age of 29.

In 1979, the Janata Party government fell due to in-fighting. The parliament was dissolved with new polls held in 1980. Lalu quit the Janata party to join the splinter group, Janta Party-S, led by Raj Narain, only to lose re-election in 1980. He managed to win the Bihar Legislative Assembly election later in 1980, and again in 1985 to become the leader of opposition in Bihar assembly in 1989. Later in 1989, he was also elected to Lok Sabha under the V. P. Singh government. By 1990, he positioned himself as the leader of Yadavs (14.26% as of 2023) and the lower castes. Muslims, who had traditionally served as Congress (I) vote bank, shifted their support to Lalu after the 1989 Bhagalpur violence. He became popular among the young voters of Bihar.

=== 1990–1997: Lalu Prasad as Chief Minister of Bihar ===
In 1990, the Janata Dal came to power in Bihar. PM V. P. Singh wanted former chief minister Ram Sundar Das to lead the government, while Chandra Shekhar backed Raghunath Jha. To break the deadlock, deputy PM Devi Lal nominated Lalu as the candidate for Chief Minister. He was victorious in an internal poll of Janata Dal MLAs and became the chief minister. On 23 September 1990, Lalu arrested L. K. Advani at Samastipur during the latter's Ram Rath Yatra to Ayodhya. The slogan "Bhurabal saaf karo" (remove upper caste) was reportedly used as a pejorative during Lalu Prasad's first tenure as Chief Minister of Bihar in the early 1990s to call for the wipeout of upper castes. The term bhurabal literally translates to "brown hair," referencing the predominantly [[Light skin|fair-skinned]] high castes. It also serves as an acronym for Bhumihar, Rajput, Brahmin, and Lala (Kayastha), referring to the four prominent upper castes in the state.

The World Bank lauded his party for its work in the 1990s on the economic front. In 1993, Lalu adopted a pro-English policy and pushed for the re-introduction of English as a language in school curriculum, contrary to the angrezi hatao (banish English) policy of then Uttar Pradesh CM Mulayam Singh Yadav. The policy of opposition to English was considered an anti-elite policy since both the leaders represented the same social constituents – the backward castes, dalits and minority communities. Lalu continued to be Bihar CM.

=== 1997–2000: Formation of RJD and national politics ===
RJD flag

In 1997, due to allegations related to the Fodder Scam, a leadership revolt surfaced in Janata Dal. Consequently, Lalu broke away from Janata Dal and formed a new political party, Rashtriya Janata Dal (RJD). In 1998 general for the 12th Lok Sabha, Lalu won from Madhepura, but lost in 1999 general election to Sharad Yadav. In 2000 Bihar Legislative Assembly election he won and remained in opposition.

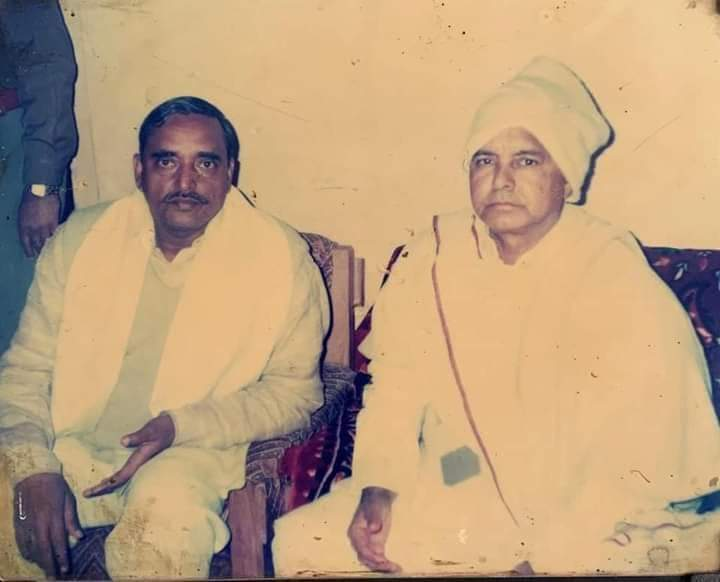
Lalu Prasad sitting with Kapildev Singh in Pokharpur during his arrival in Nalanda in 2003

=== 2000–2005: Rabri Devi as Chief Minister of Bihar ===
In 2002, Lalu was elected to the Rajya Sabha, where he stayed until 2004. In 2000, the RJD again formed the government with Rabri Devi as the CM. Except for the brief presidential rule and 7 days term of Nitish Kumar, the RJD remained in power in Bihar until 2005.

=== 2004–2009: Union Minister of Railways ===
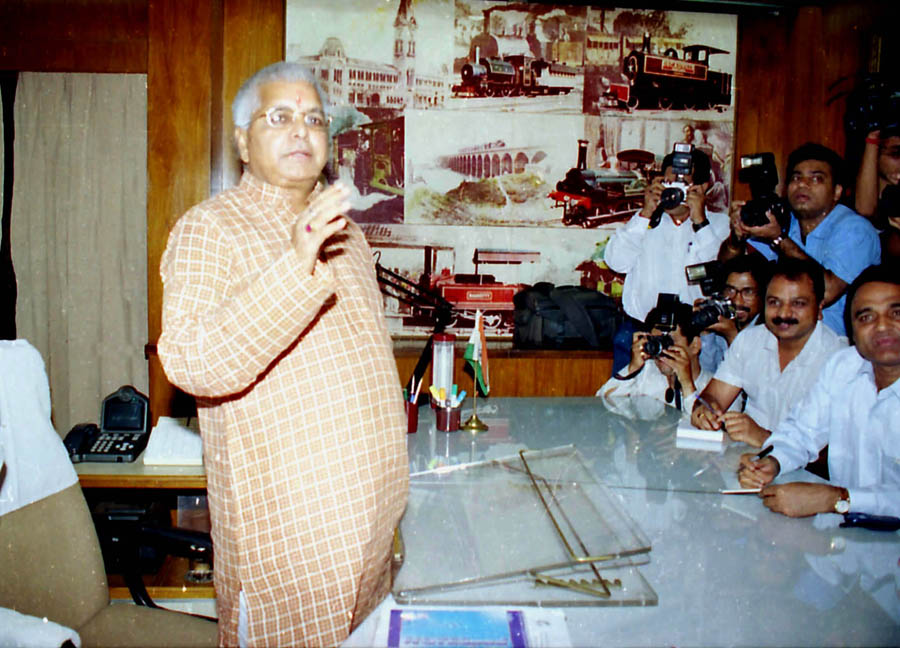
Lalu Prasad assumes the charge as Railways Minister in New Delhi on 24 May 2004

In May 2004, Lalu contested the general election from Chhapra and Madhepura against Rajiv Pratap Rudy and Sharad Yadav respectively and won both seats with a good margin. In total, RJD won 21 seats and it allied with Indian National Congress becoming second-largest member of UPA I after Congress. Lalu became the Minister of Railways in the 2004 UPA Government. Later, he gave up the Madhepura seat won by Pappu Yadav.

As railway minister, Lalu left passenger fares untouched and focused on other sources of revenue for the railways. He penalised the use of thermocol plastic cups from being used to serve tea at railway stations and replaced those with Kulhars (pottery cups), in order to generate more employment in rural areas which failed miserably due to socio-economic reasons. Later, he also said that he had plans to introduce buttermilk and khādī linen. He also introduced cushion seats in all unreserved compartments. In June 2004, he announced that he would get on the railway himself to inspect its problems and went on to board the train from Patna Railway station at midnight. During this tenure he is accused to have committed 2005 Indian Railway tender scam.

When he took over, the Indian Railways was a loss-making organisation. In the years under his leadership, he claimed a cumulative total profit of ₹38,000 crore (US$4.1 billion). Business schools around the world became interested in Lalu's leadership in managing the turnaround. The contrived turnaround was introduced as a case study by the Indian Institute of Management. Lalu also received invitations from eight Ivy League schools for lectures, and addressed over a hundred students from Harvard, Wharton and others in Hindi.

In 2006, the Harvard Business School and HEC Management School, France, showed interest in turning Lalu's contrived experiment with the Indian Railway into case studies for aspiring business graduates.

In 2009, Lalu's successor Mamata Banerjee and the opposition parties alleged that the so-called turnaround of the Railways during his tenure was merely a result of presenting financial statements differently. A 2011 report by the CAG endorsed this view. CAG found that the "surplus" shown on the financial statements during Lalu's tenure covered "cash and investible surplus", which were not included in the "net surplus" figures released by the Railways in the earlier years. The "cash surplus" included the money available for paying dividend, contribution to the Depreciation Reserve Fund used for renewal or replacement of existing assets, and other funds for investment. The "investible surplus" included the money allocated for capital expenditure. The report concluded that the performance of the Railways actually declined marginally during the last few years of Lalu's tenure.

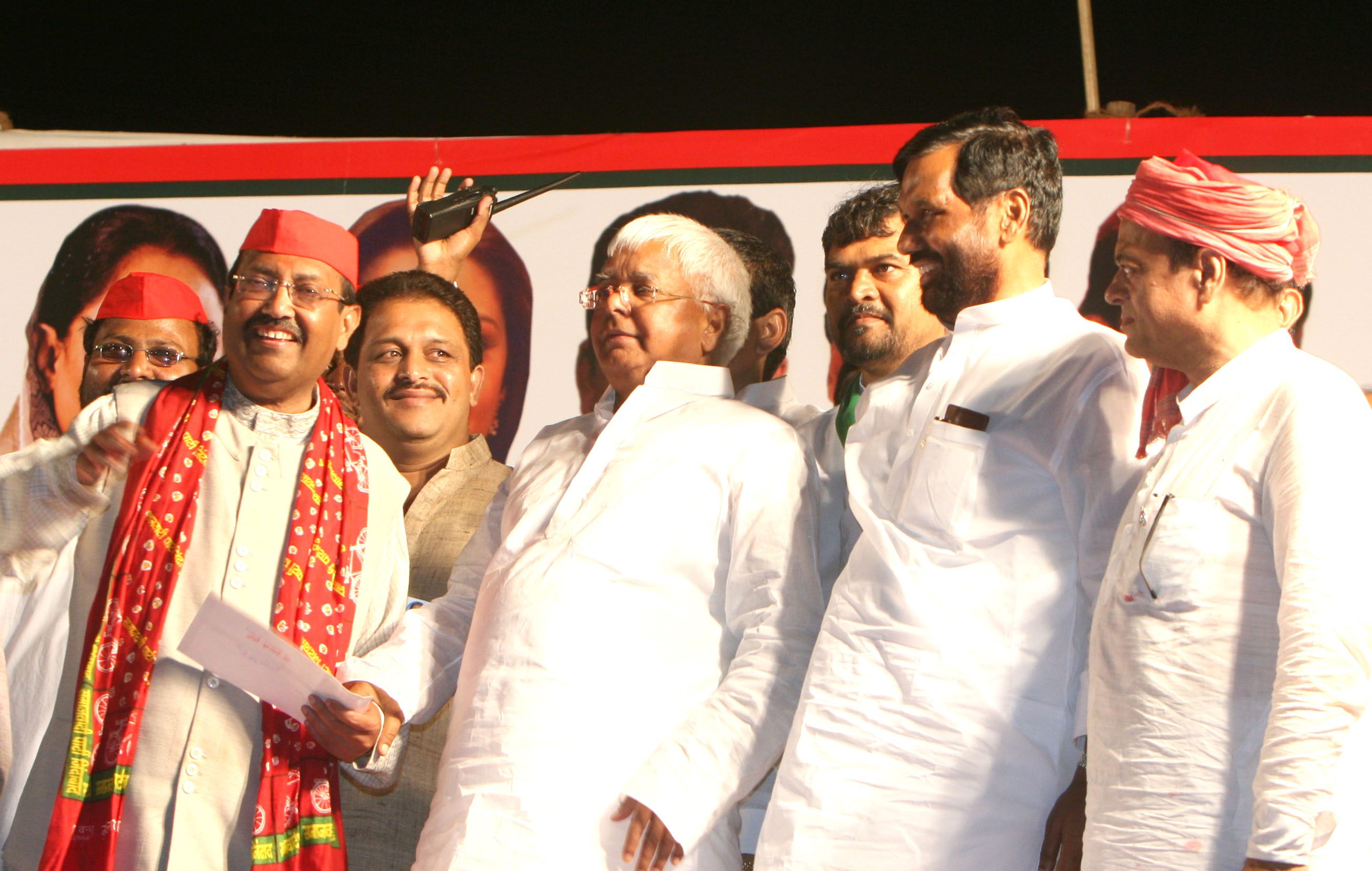
Lalu together with Ram Vilas Paswan and Amar Singh at a party rally in Mumbai during the 2009 general elections

=== 2005–2015: Out of power in Bihar and Center ===
Bihar Assembly elections were held twice in the year 2005. There was a fractured verdict in the February 2005 Assembly election. Since no government could be formed in Bihar, fresh elections were held in October–November the same year. In the October 2005 state elections RJD won 54 seats, less than JD(U) and BJP coalition led by Nitish Kumar which came to power. In the 2010 elections, the RJD tally was reduced to just 22 seats whereas the ruling alliance claimed a record 206 out of the 243 Assembly seats. In the 2009 general election RJD won 4 seats and provided outside support to Manmohan Singh government. In May 2012, Lalu Prasad envisaged Hamid Ansari, previous Vice President, as a presidential candidate. In May 2013, Lalu tried to rejuvenate the party and fuel the party workers in his Parivartan Rally. After the conviction in Fodder Scam on 3 October 2013, Lalu was disqualified from the membership of Lok Sabha. In the 2014 general election, Lalu Prasad's RJD again won 4 seats.

=== 2015–current: Grand Alliance ===
In the 2015 Bihar Assembly elections, Lalu Prasad's RJD became the largest party with a total of 81 seats. He along with his partner Nitish Kumar of the JD(U) gained absolute majority to form a government in Bihar. This was cited as a major comeback for the RJD and for Lalu on the political stage of Bihar after a gap of 10 years. But that suffocating alliance did not last long as Nitish Kumar dumped and ousted Lalu's party from the power and alliance in July 2017 after the Enforcement Directorate and Central Bureau of Investigation lodged several criminal cases against Lalu's son and Deputy Chief Minister, Tejashwi Yadav. Rashtriya Janata Dal in the 2020 Bihar Legislative Assembly elections, Tejaswini Yadav as the chief ministerial candidate of the Mahagathbandhan. The alliance won 110 seats in total out of 243, with RJD winning 75 seats, continuing to remain the single largest political party in Bihar. Since the majority required was 122, the alliance was unable to form the government, and he was elected as the Leader of Opposition of Bihar.

On 10 August 2022, Tejaswini took oath as the Deputy Chief Minister of Bihar with Nitish Kumar taking oath as chief minister as part of the Mahagathbandan formed with RJD, Congress and other Opposition Parties.

In 2024, Nitish Kumar left the Mahagathbandhan and formed the government with BJP, effectively terminating Mr. Yadav's tenure as deputy chief minister once again.

Rashtriya Janata Dal in the 2025 Bihar Legislative Assembly elections, The alliance won 35 seats in total out of 243, with RJD winning 25 seats, a record low.

== Positions held ==
Lalu has been elected 4 times as MLA and 5 times as Lok Sabha MP.

#	From	To	Position	Party
1.	1977	1979	MP (1st term) in 6th Lok Sabha from Chapra	Janata Party
2.	1980	1985	MLA (1st term) from Sonpur in 8th Vidhan Sabha	Janata Party
3.	1985	1989	MLA (2nd term) from Sonpur; Leader of Opposition in Bihar Legislative Assembly (1st term) (resigned in 1989)	Lok Dal
4.	1989	1990	MP (2nd term) in 9th Lok Sabha from Chapra (resigned in 1990)	Janata Dal
5.	1990	1995	MLC (1st term) in Bihar Legislative Council; Chief Minister (1st term) in Government of Bihar	Janata Dal
6.	1995	1998	MLA (3rd term) from Raghopur and Danapur (1995–1996); Chief Minister (2nd term) in Government of Bihar (1995–1997)	Janata Dal
7.	1998	1999	MP (3rd term) in 12th Lok Sabha from Madhepura	RJD
8.	2000	2000	MLA (4th term) from Raghopur (resigned in 2000) and Danapur (resigned in 2002)	RJD
9.	2002	2004	MP (1st term) in Rajya Sabha from Bihar (resigned in 2004)	RJD
10.	2004	2009	MP (4th term) in 14th Lok Sabha from Chapra and Madhepura (resigned from Madhepura in 2004); Minister of Railways in Government of India	RJD
11.	2009	2013	MP (5th term) in 15th Lok Sabha from Saran (disqualified in October 2013, due to conviction in Fodder Scam)	RJD

Note:

- 2004: Re-elected to the 14th Lok Sabha (4th term) from Chapra and Madhepura; retained Chapra. Appointed Cabinet Minister in the Ministry of Railways in UPA govt. Lalu, wife Rabri Devi, son Tejashwi Yadav and daughter Misha Bharti booked for railway tender bribery scam, disproportionate illegal property and income tax evasion cases in 2017.
- 2009: Re-elected to the 15th Lok Sabha (5th term). Contested two seats. Lost from Pataliputra but won from Saran, and disqualified in 2013 subsequent to his conviction in the first fodder scam case. And barred from contesting elections for 6 years.

== Populist policies and consolidation of lower castes ==
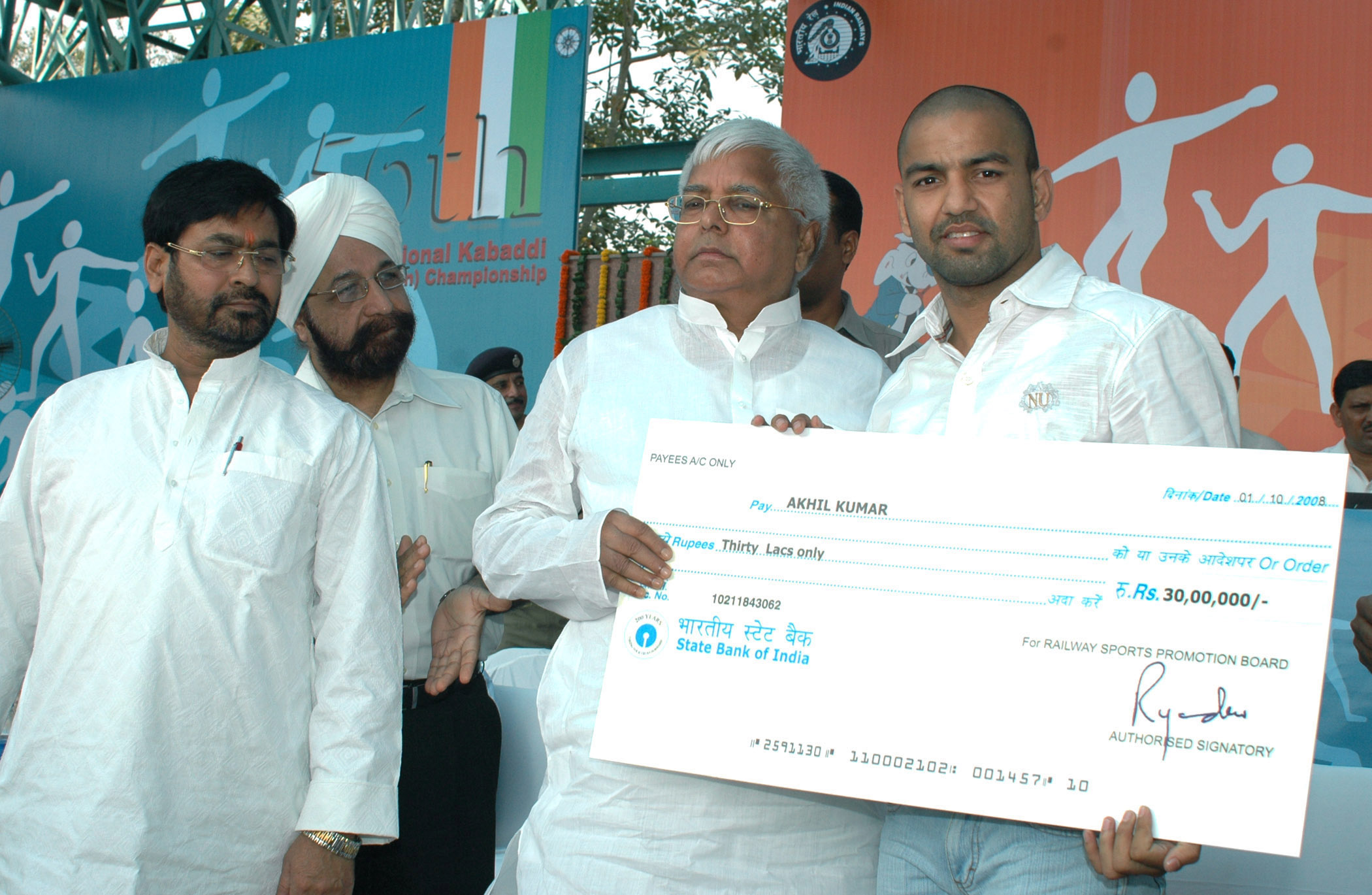
Lalu Prasad presenting a cheque of Rs. 30 lakhs to Akhil Kumar at the opening ceremony of the 56th Senior National Kabaddi (Men & Women) Championship being organized by Railway Sports Promotion Board.

According to Seyed Hossein Zarhani, although Lalu Prasad became a hate figure among Forward Castes, he drew huge support from backward castes and Dalits. He was criticised for neglecting development, but a study conducted during his reign, among downtrodden Musahars revealed that despite the construction of houses for them not being concluded at required pace, they are obliged to choose him as their leader as he returned them their ijjat (honour) and for the first time they are allowed to vote as per their own wishes. A number of populist policies which directly impacted his "Backward Caste" supporters were launched during his tenure. Some of these being establishment of Charvaha schools, where children of poor could get skilled; abolishment of cess on toddy and making of the negligence of rules related to reservation for "Backward Castes" as cognizable offence. Lalu Prasad mobilised 'Backwards' through his identity politics. According to his conception, Forward Castes were elite in the outlook and thus he portrayed himself as, "Messiah of Backwards" by ensuring that his way of living remain identical to his supporters who were mostly poor. He even continued to reside in his quarter of one room after getting elected as Chief Minister, though later he moved to official residence of the CM for administrative convenience.

Another significant event during his regime was the recruitment of 'Backward Castes' and communities to government services in large numbers. The government's white paper claimed to have significant number of vacancies in health sector and similar manpower crunch existed across various sectors. The rules of recruitment were changed drastically in order to benefit "Backward Castes", who supported him. The frequent transfer of existing officers, who were at the higher echelon of bureaucracy was also an important feature of Lalu Prasad and Rabri Devi's regime. These developments led to collapse of administration and entire system. Lalu however continued to rule Bihar due to massive support from "Backward Castes" as well as his emphasis on "honour" which he considered more important than the development. Thus according to Zarhani, for the lower caste he was a charismatic leader who was capable to become the voice of those who were silent for long.

Another form of mobilisation of his Dalit supporters by Lalu Prasad was popularising all those folk heroes of lower castes, who were said to have vanquished the upper caste adversaries. One such example is of a popular Dalit saint who was revered as he not only ran away with an upper caste girl but also suppressed all her kins. Praising him could enrage Bhumihar caste in some parts of Bihar. There is a grand celebration every year at a particular place near Patna and Lalu Prasad participates in this fair with pomp and show. His energetic participation in this show makes it a rallying point for Dalits, who saw it as their victory and the harassment of upper castes.

According to Kalyani Shankar, Lalu created a feeling amongst the oppressed that they are real rulers of state under him. He continuously lambasted the oppressors on the behalf of the oppressed and led to their emergence as the pivot of political power. The upper caste, who composed just 13.2% of the population, were controlling most of the land while the 'Backwards', who were 51%, own very little land. The advent of Lalu led to a drastic change in the economic profile of the state, followed by the diversification of the occupation of the 'Backwards' and increase in land owned by them.

Lalu also instilled a sense of confidence among Muslims by stopping Lal Krishna Advani's controversial "Rath yatra". Muslims of Bihar were feeling a sense of insecurity after the ghastly 1989 Bhagalpur riots. The Satyendra Narayan Singh government failed to control law and order situation thus death toll reached over 1000. The people affected were mostly poor weavers and others belonging to low strata of society and hence they were looking for a leader who could control the deteriorating situation of state under Congress. According to Kalyani, during this period upper castes were totally marginalised and 'Backwards' came to control the power firmly.

== Emergence as the leader of plebeians ==
During his tenure, Lalu never tried to emulate the erstwhile elite chief ministers. He took part in the public festivals and popularised his famous Kurta far Holi (cloth tearing Holi). On this occasion his invitees and the media persons would reach his house shouting: Kaha Chhupal hai Lalu Sala (Where is the bloody Lalu hiding?). Lalu also responded in a similar abusive tone. The vulgar songs were also played on the occasion. Besides this, he never hesitated in calling himself the son of a poor Goala (herder). During his public celebration of Holi festival, he used to play the Dhol himself and dance to the beat of Jogira song. Lalu's rallies were called railla, a symbol of masculinity. Those participating in these rallies were supposed to carry a lathi, a robust stick, which was both the symbol of "masculinity" as well as the chief weapon of a "herder", who used it to manage his cows. The drinking of Bhang, a natural liquor and sitting the whole night to watch the Launda dance (Dance of a Eunuch acting as a woman) made him popular among rural Biharis but all of these obscene activities of a Chief Minister irritated the middle class sensibilities. According to Ashwini Kumar:

An astute mix of lower caste with minority politics therefore helped Lalu Yadav to establish his hold over the political scenario in Bihar. This marked the beginning of, what came to be known as 'Total politics' in which the identity of caste, class and religion came to be manipulated and exploited by the new state elite to retain and remain in power forever. As opposed to the traditional Congress-centric secular politics, the new secular politics of Lalu Prasad was non Brahmanical, vernacular and popular.

== Confrontation with bureaucracy and other policies ==
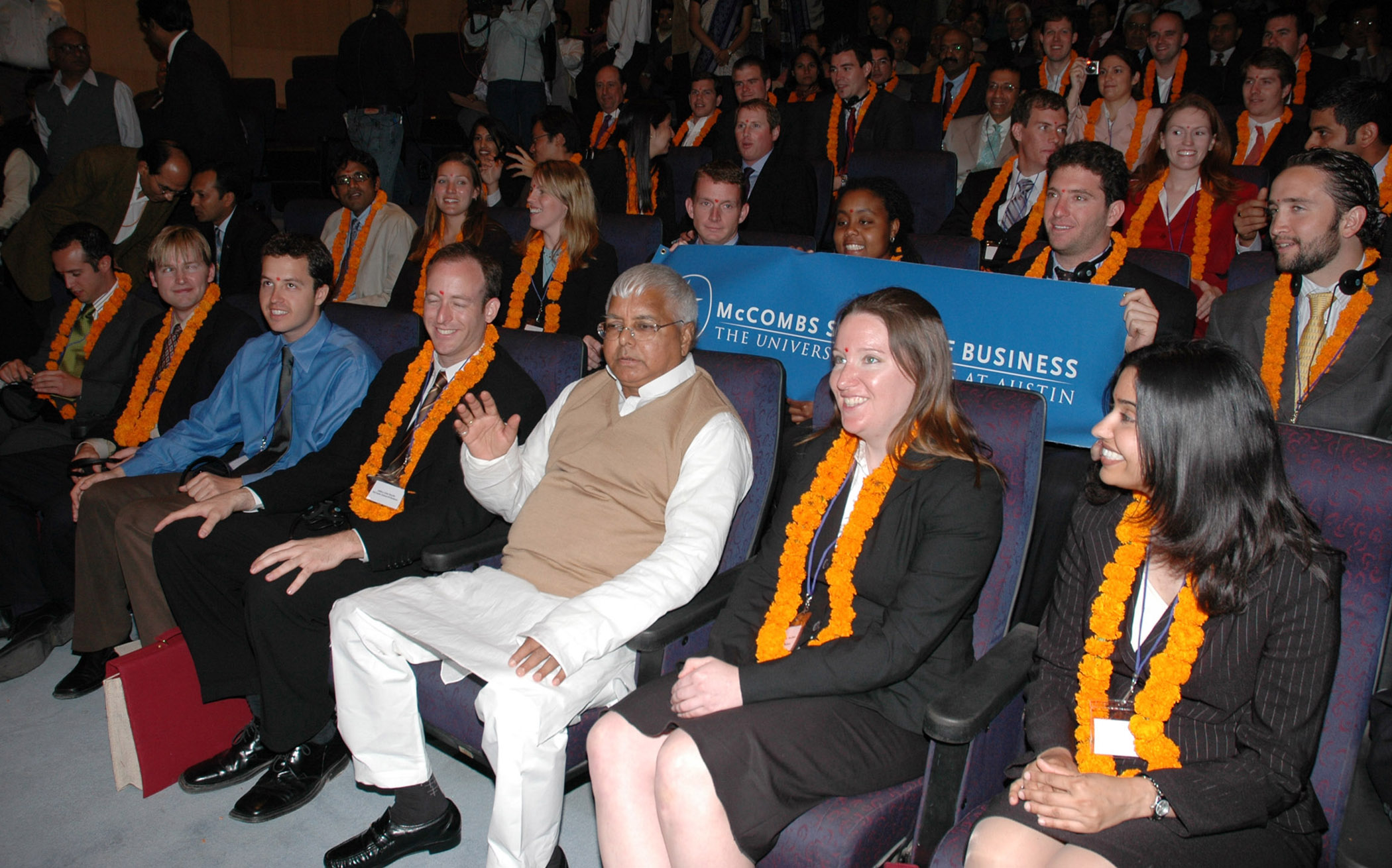
Lalu Prasad interacting with a group of MBA students from University of Texas and University of Virginia (USA) on the topic "Turn Around of Indian Railways," in New Delhi on 16 March 2007.

With the coming in power of Lalu Prasad, the representation of OBC saw a spurt in the legislative assembly of state. The upper-caste were at great disadvantage due to the new caste composition of the state legislature. In his second tenure, when the elections of 1995 took place in the state, the OBC legislators became 49.69 per cent in the assembly and the upper caste legislators fell to 17.28 per cent, a massive decline since 1960s (In 1995 Bihar Legislative Assembly elections, only 61 upper caste legislators were elected, while the number of Backward Caste legislators was 165). The domination of the Backwards in the legislature brought it into conflict with the bureaucracy, which was still dominated by the upper-castes. There witnessed a hike in incidents of corruption, because the upper-caste bureaucrats utilised the 'lack of knowledge' in administration of the new legislators (from the OBC background) to stealthily sabotage and subvert constructive policies of the Lalu's government.

Since, the administrative class belonged to landed class of upper caste; the Thakur, Bhumihar, Kayastha and Brahmin, they aimed at this obstruction, in order to secure not only their personal interest, but also the interest of the social class, they belonged to. The advent of Lalu Prasad to power was considered as end of their dominance. Hence, amidst confrontation between the bureaucracy and the legislature, the upper-caste dominated bureaucracy became determined to obstruct the caste based social justice promoted by the Janata Dal government under Lalu. They often resorted to frequent defiance of orders to maintain the status-quo. Hence, the government undermined the bureaucracy, as the government, which is said to have voted to power on the platform of OBC empowerment, was also determined to bring the social justice, even at the cost of administrative disfunction.

At the time, the caste composition of judiciary also mirrored the bureaucracy and latter too come into conflict with the government. In the meantime, in the year 1996, a major scandal was witnessed in the state, which involved embezzlement of billions of rupees from the Animal Husbandry Department of state. Initially, the case was to be investigated by Bihar police, which means, government to be in the control of the investigation, but later the judiciary came into play, and the reservation of the case by Supreme Court for Central Bureau of Investigation, saw Patna High Court assuming charge over the case. The Fodder Scam, as it was called was a new series of conflict between the government on one hand and the CBI and Judiciary at the other hand.

Between 1990 and 2005, the government under Lalu Prasad's Janata Dal undertook several measures to strengthen the control of OBCs, Scheduled Caste and Muslims over bureaucracy. Latter were given the powerful position like those of District Magistrate. Transfers of the upper echelon of bureaucracy was also frequently resorted to. In the year 1993, the post of Director General of Police as well as Chief Secretary were both given to officers belonging to lower castes and the incumbent officers, who were both Brahmins were removed. Since the strategy of transfer of unwanted bureaucrats has a limit, Lalu's government was adamant in use of quota to fill these posts with the officials from the subaltern background. If unable to appoint the lower castes, the government chose to keep many posts vacant, to prevent the upper castes from occupying them.

In order to weaken the upper-caste bureaucracy, the scope for intervention in its functioning by the party officials, belonging to Janata Dal was kept open.Hence, increased interference by party activists in the functioning of bureaucracy and police was witnessed. Meanwhile, the resurgence of the OBCs and SCs also resulted in extension of patronage to many of the Bahubalis ( a term representing someone with money and muscle power with criminal background) from these social groups. Lalu Prasad is said to have patronised; Pappu Yadav, operating out of Purnea and Madhepura districts; Vinod Yadav, operating out of Bhagalpur district; Surendra Yadav, operating out of Gaya district; Mohammad Shahabuddin, operating out of Siwan district; Makhi Paswan, operating out of Khagaria district; and Mohammed Suleiman, operating out of Kishanganj district. Lalu's aide Brij Bihari Prasad, who was known for his muscle power ended the crime empire of Devendra Dubey, that was spread from East Champaran to Muzaffarpur district. Naxal leaders like Ravindra Singh Kushwaha, who were waging a war against the landlords through various naxal organisations active in the state, were invited to Janata Dal and allotted tickets to contest in assembly election. Subsequently, all the criminal cases against him were dropped, during the premiership of Lalu.

A popular opinion outside Bihar with respect to weakening of bureaucracy and "breakdown of governance" was the presence of rampant corruption and leadership's ineptitude in Lalu's regime. But, according to Jeffrey Witsoe, the RJD deliberately weakened the state institutions controlled by upper-castes in order to empower the lower castes. The OBCs were in control of government but the media and the bureaucracy along with the judiciary was still in control of upper-castes, it was this upper-caste dominance of the other state institutions that the OBC leadership was vying to end by trying to displace the upper-castes effectively from power.

In the meantime, accusations were laid against Lalu's government for fomenting caste based antagonism between various social groups. Various commentators have stressed that under Lalu's Janata Dal rule, the agricultural labourers and untouchables became vocal for respect from the dominant class and the fair wages. Retaliation on the part of lower castes were also seen, when the dominant caste militias tried to quell their revolt on these grounds. In one such case, in December 1991, a dominant caste militia called "Savarna Liberation Front" gangraped and murdered ten Dalit women, in retaliation, the left wing militants all belonging either Dalit or Backward Castes killed thirty five people from the dominant caste. William Dalrymple has chronicled the account of a dominant caste landowner who survived the massacre. The interlocutor of Dalrymple, who declared the incident to be a handiwork of Bihar government under Lalu Prasad said:

The government will not protect us. It is on their side. This is the Kali Yug, the epoch of disintegration. The lower castes are rising up. Everything is falling apart.

Another account from the Sargana Gram Panchayat area testifies the change in established socio-political order brought by the government under Lalu Prasad. A large Rajput farmer from the Panchayat constituency, who had been a predecessor of the incumbent Mukhiya of the village said:

The Backwards control the Government. In return, the Government pampers the Backwards (Sar pe chadha kar rakha hai). Not only that, they talk about empowering the harijans. They have both ruined the State. To top it all, they say they will protect the Pakistanis (an epithet to describe Muslims)....

As per one opinion, Lalu extended tacit support to the Maoist Communist Centre of India (MCC), and in the period of caste wars, he, as a Chief Minister frequently visited the places, where the victims were from Backward Castes. It is opined that many people from these castes voted him, only because he represented their aspiration of speaking back and becoming virile. The poor of the state couldn't gain much in terms of jobs and services of state, but they were no longer left to be treated with disdain. Nandini Gooptu has mentioned some studies from the rural Bihar, belonging to the time period following the coming into power of Lalu Prasad, where the Schedule Castes like Musahars became vocal for their rights including wages, for the work they do under 'employment guarantee schemes' of government. In one such study, a Musahar woman was recorded abusing the government officials belonging to Rajput caste for cheating [them] on wages due to them. Similarly, in another case, a Schedule Tribe Santhal was recorded taunting son of a Kayastha landlord. Many changes were observed at the lowest level of governance too; in one such case, a Rajput landlord family was replaced by a Kevat caste man for the post of Mukhiya in a village. These changes in the rural Bihar was found to be remarkable, considering the brutally enforced inequalities persisting therein for years.

In the early years of his rise in political circle, Lalu Prasad was also successful in creating defection in the left-wing political parties of the state, which had long history of association with Naxalism. In the areas around Nalanda and Aurangabad, the weakening of the CPI-ML liberation is attributed to the significant rise of Rashtriya Janata Dal (RJD) led by Lalu Prasad. The RJD successfully attracted the Koeri and Yadav leadership of the party, thus strengthening itself at the cost of liberation. The leaders of CPI (ML) liberation, who defected to RJD included, Shri Bhagwan Singh Kushwaha, Umesh Singh, K.D Yadav and Suryadev Singh.

Lalu's rule also led to breaking away of patron-client relationship in elections between the upper castes and the Dalits. The labourers of the upper caste landlords were primarily people from Dalit background, who were forced to vote in the elections as per the wishes of their masters, the upper castes. But, in this period, the agricultural labourers were given free hand in exercising their power to select their representatives. This transformation of the existing system brought political freedom for a large number of Dalits.

Earlier, the primary schools, which served as polling station during the elections used to be present in the upper caste villages. Hence, the Dalits needed to visit the upper caste villages to vote during elections. This was a problematic arrangement as the upper caste used to coerce them to vote their preferred candidate. However, journalist Amberish K Diwanji, who visited many villages in Bihar during 2005 Assembly elections, found that these schools were shifted to lower caste villages, by Lalu Prasad when he assumed the charge of state in earlier elections. This prevented the upper castes from coercing the Dalits during elections, and latter can exercise their franchise freely. Diwanji also noted that there existed robust social bonding between Yadavs and Musahars in some regions of Madhepura district. As per his report, in this region, the Yadavs had taken the place of upper caste in deciding, to whom the Musahars will vote. But, unlike upper castes, who didn't mingle with the Musahars, the Yadavs, specially the poor ones, considered them as equal. Due to similar economic condition, the poor Yadavs in the region, mingled with the Musahars, their children play with each other and they behaved as a single social unit. Reportedly, this bonding often transforms into votes and Musahars prefers Lalu Prasad than any other political leader.

In some of the regions of the rural area of South Bihar, after the establishment of rule of Janata Dal under Lalu Prasad, the realignment in the policy of militant organisations like Maoist Communist Centre was observed. The MCC was dominated by the members of Yadav caste in the leadership position and the Schedule Castes served as the foot soldiers. Before advent of Lalu Prasad on the scene in 1980s, MCC was waging a "class war", however, after Lalu Prasad assumed the premiership of the state the Yadav caste and Schedule Castes of the MCC shifted their loyalty to him. Earlier, the MCC had targeted Rajputs in the Dalelchak-Bhagaura massacre, but according to author Shashi Bhushan Singh, Lalu wanted a political alliance with the Rajputs and he directed the MCC members, specially his castemen to stop targeting the Rajputs. The Rajputs also accepted the dominance of Naxalite groups over the time in some regions of south Bihar and the Bhumihars remained the major challenger to both the Naxalites as well as the rule of Lalu Prasad.

After perpetrating a number of massacre of Dalits, Ranvir Sena, the caste based militia of Bhumihar caste perpetrated Miyanpur massacre in 2000, in Aurangabad, Bihar. In this massacre, the Yadav caste was victim; over 30 people were killed by Sena in this incident. However, it is reported that this incident set tone for decline of Sena. As the party of Lalu Prasad, which was in government took stringent administrative policies on one hand to counter Sena, on the other hand various naxalite group also resolved their internal differences and started an extermination campaign of the men of Sena in small operations.

=== Combination of political and non-political conflicts ===
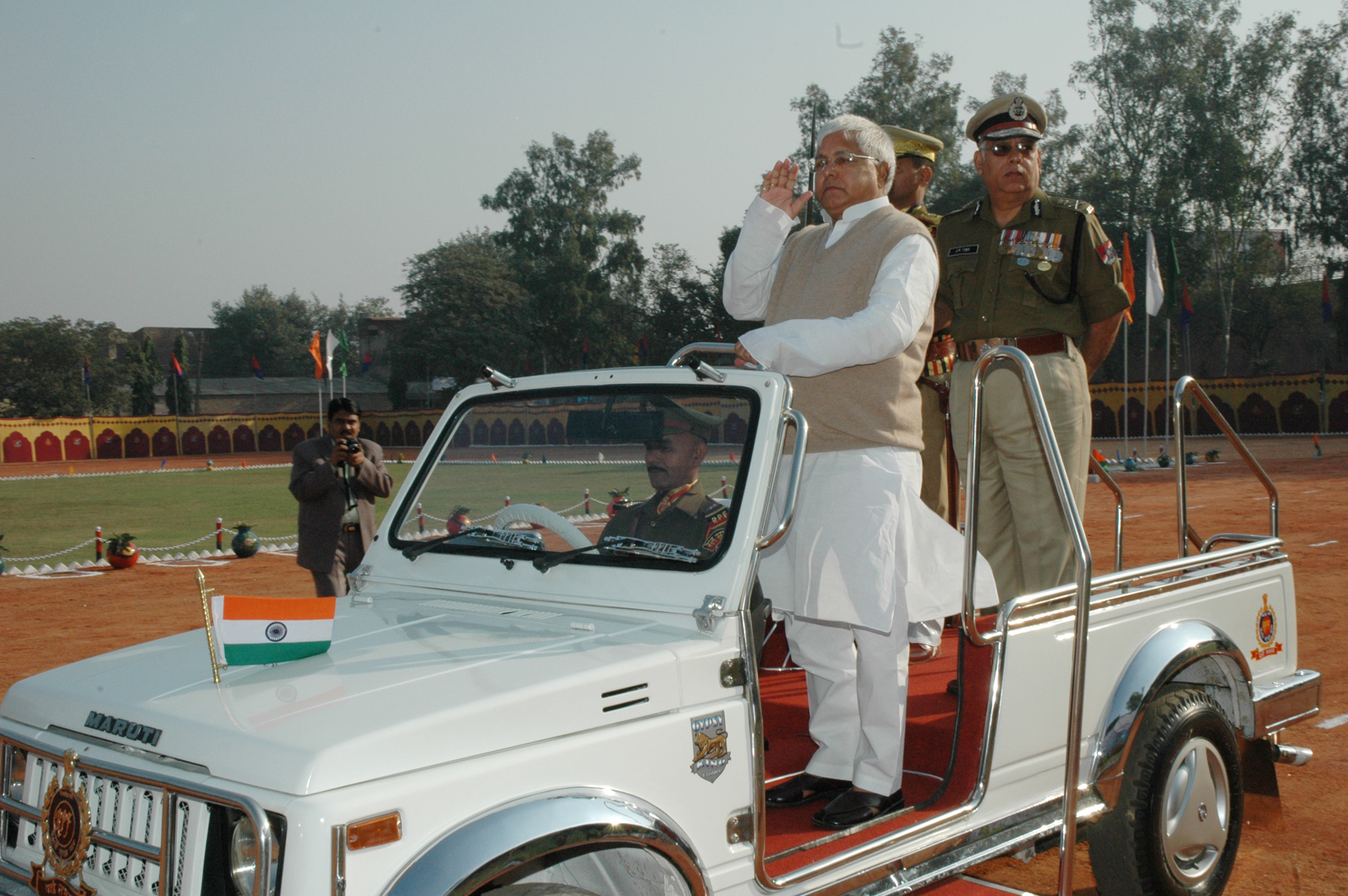
Lalu Prasad inspecting Guard of Honour at the Anniversary-cum-Investiture Parade on 22 November 2006.

The society of Bihar was divided into OBCs, SCs and Forward Castes (upper caste); the forward castes had dominated the democratic institutions of the state in the rule of Congress and only a section of OBCs were politically conscious to think of replacing them from political power, this section, which included only three caste (Koeri, Kurmi and Yadav) also owned land in other parts of Bihar, but was poor in the areas dominated of the forward castes. They took land on tenancy from the forward castes, as they were marginal farmers in these areas. A fair number of the OBCs were also employed in the state institutions and were among educated servicemen in the urban areas. They remained victims of the high handedness of the upper-caste colleagues and the rivalry between them was evolving over time.

In rural areas, the OBCs were also confronting the MBC or Extremely Backward Class (also called Most Backward Castes, the category which includes more than hundred Backward Castes, other than trio of Koeri, Kurmi and Yadav) and the Scheduled Castes, but the upper-castes treated all sections of Backward Castes in the same manner, causing much resentment among the elite section of the Backwards. In the rural areas, the upper-castes countered the Most Backward Classes and Schedule Castes, when they wanted to eschew the village based livelihood options. They [upper-castes] reacted violently, when the MBC or the SCs tried to detach from any social institutions, that were symbol of low caste status. Since for different reasons, the OBCs, MBCs and the SCs were all pitted against the common rivals, the upper-castes, and the bitterness between the OBCs and the forward castes had strengthened after the anti-reservation protest launched by the upper-castes, unification of these social groups took place against the forward castes.

The rise of Lalu Prasad provided an opportunity to unite all these social groups and the Naxalite groups, which had many OBCs in the leadership positions, also supported the political party led by Lalu. Maoist Communist Centre of India, one of the most significant Naxalite group also sided with the interest of OBCs, and the MCC activists started providing armed backing to the Most Backward Classes and the Schedule Castes to exercise their franchise in order to led the candidates of Lalu's party towards victory. Hence, for a while, the boundary between political and Naxalite movement got blurred.

According to Professor Shashi Bhushan Singh, Department of Sociology, Delhi School of Economics, since the numerical strength of upper-caste (approximately 20% of state's population) was not enough to have large number of MLAs in the state legislature in order to control the Backward Castes, they resorted to undemocratic practices in order to retain the power in their hand, leading to rise of militancy among a section of Backwards.

The forward castes were required to send large numbers of MLAs into the state legislature, but devoid of numerical strength and encountering aggressive backward classes, the forward castes started looting polling booths with the help of the state officials and police who were mainly from among the forward castes. Subsequently the state became a biased entity. Thus, while most of the backward classes still reposed their faith in democratic struggle, a section of OBCs were attracted towards non-democratic ideas and organisations to confront the forward castes.

According to Singh, when Lalu Prasad asked for support from the members of Backward Castes, he was actually asking it in order to change the entire social order, in which upper caste were at advantage. The reservation policy introduced by the implementation of Mandal Commission recommendations though didn't benefitted the Scheduled Castes, yet they supported Lalu Prasad against the forward castes.

According to a Social Scientist, who witnessed the encounter of Lalu with a person from the Musahar caste in North India, during his election campaign for 2000 Bihar Assembly elections, Lalu allegedly argued with latter, when he asked him to provide road infrastructure in the region. As per narrative, Lalu Prasad believed that the investment by state in physical infrastructure were somehow meant for benefitting the upper castes, who were having significant presence at the higher level of bureaucracy and in professional services. Hence, he blatantly created disruption in the general process of development, until the Upper Backward Castes take over the Forward Castes in these services. A majority of the District Magistrates during his tenure were from the Upper Backward Castes, and he also tried to ensure that the administrative posts at the middle level, for the rank of Sub Divisional Magistrates (SDM) and Block Development Officer (BDO) were also filled by these caste group only. For the professional services like Doctors and Engineers too, same formula was implemented.

According to author Arun Sinha, though Lalu and his colleague and successor Nitish Kumar belonged to same political roots, in the matter of quota politics and the politics of social justice for the deprived section of society, Kumar was accepted to upper castes. One reason behind this was step taken by Kumar for exclusion of well off section of the Backward Castes from the benefits of reservation in government jobs and other state sponsored program for social upliftment. In contrast to Kumar, Lalu Prasad has been described by Sinha, and was perceived as a staunch anti-upper caste leader.

The tenure of Lalu Prasad and his wife Rabari Devi coincided with Maoist Communist Centre becoming more violent than earlier. It was during Rabari Devi's tenure that Senari carnage against the Bhumihars took place. In this incident, over hundred armed activists of MCC slaughtered 34 Bhumihars in the village called senari by brutally slitting their throats. As per reports, Rabari Devi refused to visit Senari, probably because the village inhabitants and victims, being member of Bhumihar caste had always opposed her government. It was reported that after being implicated in corruption scandal, Lalu Prasad raised his wife to the post of Chief Minister; latter was reportedly illiterate, but this was not offensive to the poor of Bihar. It is observed that for their plight, in the struggle against Dalit dominated naxal groups like MCC, Bhumihars prefer to blame Lalu, who is described as a champion of lower castes.

== Political symbolism ==
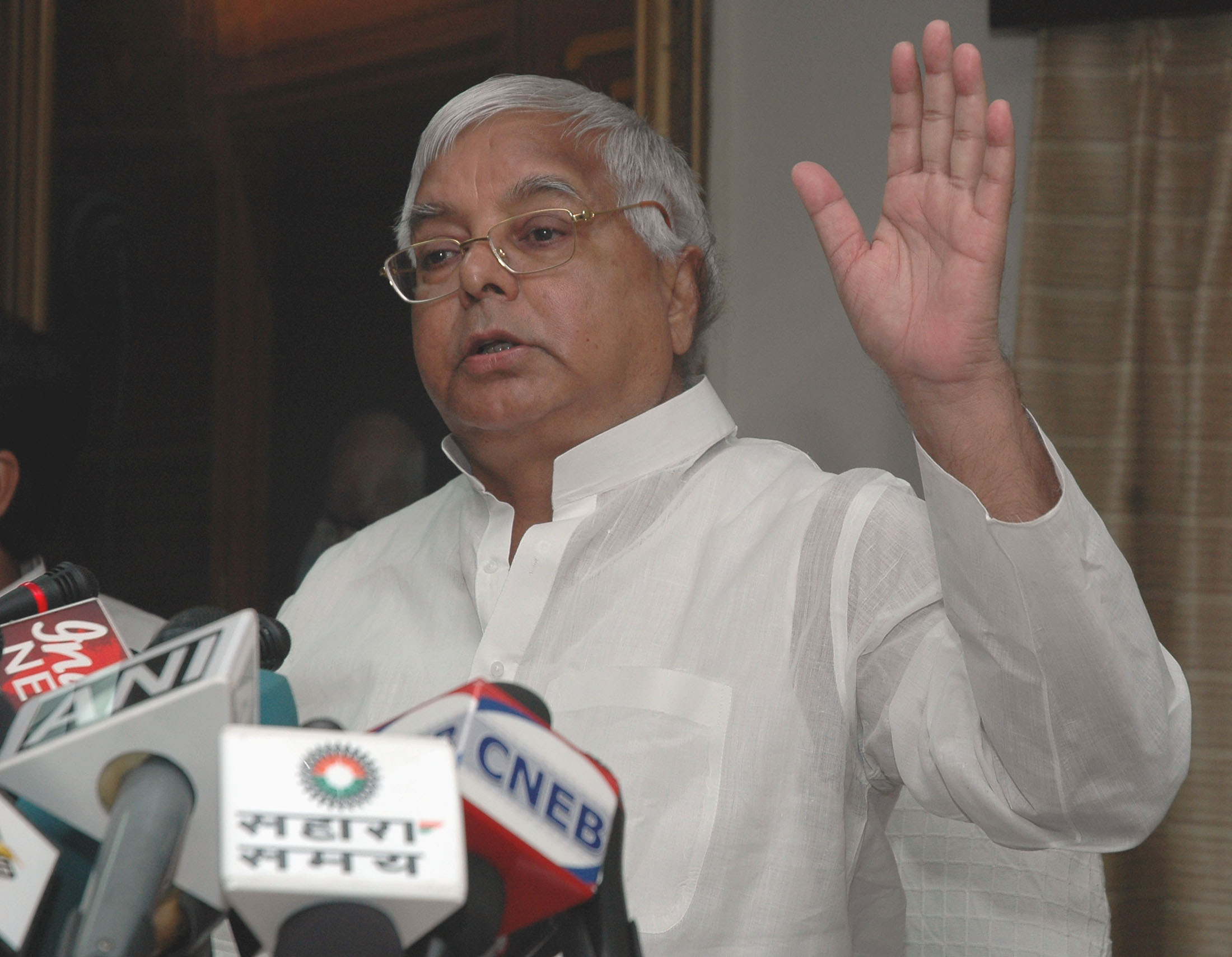
Lalu Prasad in 2008, addressing at Delhi.

Lalu's politics is described as being against Hindu Nationalism promoted by political parties like Bhartiya Janata Party. He employed political symbolism to a large extent in order to confront the politics based on militant religious ideology. In April 2003, he is reported to have organised a great rally at Gandhi Maidan, Patna, which was aimed at radicalising his lower caste supporters and mobilising them against the politics of Bhartiya Janata Party and Vishwa Hindu Parishad (VHP). In its rally, VHP was distributing Trishuls to the participants, which was a symbol of militant Hindu identity. Lalu asked his rural supporters to join him in Gandhi Maidan with a Lathi (a robust stick) against the Trishuls of VHP. He said that, this implement (Lathi) of the rural poor, which was considered as the weapon of weak, will destroy the Trishul of hatred (an implicit attack on BJP's and VHP's politics of religion).

As per an eyewitness report, on the day of rally, the rural lower caste supporters of Lalu Prasad rushed towards Patna; many of them were brought in hurry by the local leaders of the Rashtriya Janata Dal to showcase their support to Lalu Prasad. The theme of the rally was, Bhajpa Bhagao Desh Bachao (get rid of Bhartiya Janata Party and save the country). The rallygoers flooded the city armed with Lathis, and in their way to Patna, many of them occupied the trains rushing towards city forcefully. Many windows of the trains were thrashed and the hostels located in Patna were occupied for the rallygoers. The crowd was so massive that the traffic in the city was destabilized for two days. The supporters were told to apply oil to their Lathis and recite the slogan: Lathi pilavan, Patna laavan, Bhajpa bhagavan, Desh bachavan (we will apply oil to our Lathis, bring it to Patna, remove the Bhartiya Janata Party and save the country). The large gathering of followers of Lalu Prasad in capital city of state of Bihar symbolised the capture of the real centre of power by latter, as the city was reported to have flooded with Lathi welding supporters of Rashtriya Janata Dal, who were mostly the lower caste people coming from rural background.

=== 1996 Gareeb Rally ===
Lalu's rally were contact point between him and his rural supporters. In 1996, a massive "rally of the poor" (Gareeb Rally) was organised by Janata Dal. Author Bela Bhatia, who was an eyewitness of this rally organised at Patna has mentioned that the poor people who assembled at Patna, were provided free commutation facility to become a part of this rally. There were numerous programmes organised by the office bearers of the Janata Dal for the rallyites. Bhatia has mentioned about the Trains, that were running on Arrah-Patna route, and carrying the rallyites to Patna. As she described the trains and buses were carrying more passengers than their capacity. Many of the people congregated at Patna either to lodge their grievances to the Chief Minister or in the hope of getting some monetary help. Bhatia describes an event being sponsored by Janata Dal legislator Shyam Rajak for the entertainment of rallyites, symbolising the acquaintance of the Chief Minister, Lalu Prasad with the taste of his rural supporters.

Later at around 10 that night as I made my way from one part of the city to another, I was witness near the station to an incongruous sight, "a randi ka nach' (dance by a prostitute), one of the many similar programmes organised in the city ostensibly for the 'manoranjan' (recreation) of the rallyites. The shamiana was packed with villagers from far and near, the stage was set with green banners and under fluorescent lamps danced a young woman. A modern dancer with step-cut hair, a pink flare skirt swirling around her, as she danced with a mixture of western and traditional dance steps, to the tune of an alluring Magahi love song.

== Elevation of grassroot workers to important position ==
In contrast to elections being based on money power, and the phenomenon of most of the candidates getting elected to houses of legislature in Bihar belonging to high income groups, RJD under Lalu Prasad has raised grassroot political workers from poor background to important positions in the politics of state. This is done occasionally to showcase the pro-poor stand of Lalu Prasad. In 2022, Lalu led election of a Dalit woman, Munni Rajak from Dhobi caste (washerman) to the seventy-five membered Bihar Legislative Council. Another example is of Ramvrikish Sada, the Rashtriya Janata Dal MLA from Alauli Assembly constituency, Khagaria district. Sada has even claimed that, he and his family worship Lalu Prasad besides Sabari, the deity of Musahars. Sada, who was associated with RJD for thirty years was reported to be the poorest MLA of Bihar in 2020 Bihar Legislative Assembly elections. He claimed that even money for running in election was provided to him by family of Lalu Prasad and he has just ₹ 70,000 in his bank account.

== Corruption charges and conviction ==
=== Corruption cases ===
Lalu Prasad has been convicted and jailed in two scams. As of January 2018, he, his wife Rabri Devi, his sons Tejashwi Yadav and Tej Pratap Yadav, and his eldest daughter Misha Bharti were all facing charges in several other corruption cases.

==== 1996 Fodder Scam – 1st case ====
Lalu was an accused party and later convicted in the first Fodder Scam case of 1996. The case involved the siphoning off of about ₹4.50 billion ($111.85 million) from the animal husbandry department.

Several allegations of embezzlement from the animal husbandry department were tabled between 1990 and 1995. In January 1996, a raid conducted on Chaibasa treasury indicated the siphoning off of funds by non-existent companies. Lalu ordered an inquiry to probe the irregularities. However, after a public interest litigation, the Bihar High Court in March 1996 ordered the case to be handed over to the CBI. In June 1997, the CBI filed the charge sheet in the case and made Lalu an accused. The charge forced Lalu Prasad to resign from the office of Chief Minister, at which time he appointed his wife, Rabri Devi, to the office.

In 2001, the Supreme Court of India transferred the scam cases to newly formed court in Ranchi, Jharkhand. The trial began in 2002. In August 2013, Lalu Prasad tried to get the trial court judge transferred, but his plea was rejected by Supreme Court of India. Lalu has been an accused in many of the 53-odd cases filed. He has been remanded to custody on multiple occasions because of the number of cases. Over 64 people were convicted in the case. Lalu was first sent to "Judicial remand" (Bihar Military Police guest house, Patna) on 30 July 1997, for 134 days. On 28 October 1998, he was again sent to the same guest house for 73 days. When the Supreme Court took exception to his guest house stay, he had also moved to the Beur jail in Patna. On 26 November 2001, Lalu was again remanded, in a case related to the fodder scam. Lalu accused the NDA of creating a conspiracy against him. On 1 October 2004, the Supreme Court served a notice to Lalu Prasad and his wife in response to a petition which alleged that they have been interfering with the investigation.

Lalu, along with 44 other accused, was convicted on 30 September 2013 after being found guilty in fraudulent withdrawal of ₹37 crores (₹370 million) from Chaibasa treasury. Several other politicians, IAS officers were also convicted in the case. Immediately after the verdict was pronounced, Lalu was arrested and taken to Birsa Munda Central Jail, located at Ranchi. Lalu Prasad was disqualified as MP for six years. He was given a jail sentence of five years and a fine of ₹25 lakh (₹2.5 million).

He was released on bail from Birsa Munda Central Jail, after he completed the bail formalities in a Special CBI court, 2 1/2 months after his conviction.

==== 1998 disproportionate assets case ====
In 1998, a disproportionate assets (DA) case arising out of the fodder scam was registered against Lalu Prasad and Rabri Devi. In April 2000, both were made co-accused in the charge-sheet and surrendered. While Rabri Devi got bail due to being Chief Minister of Bihar, Lalu was remanded in Beur jail for 11 days. They were acquitted in 2006. The Bihar government wanted to appeal against the acquittal but the Supreme Court in 2010 ruled that the state government can not challenge such rulings.

==== 1996 Fodder Scam – 2nd case ====
Lalu Prasad was convicted and jailed in the second Fodder Scam case of ₹8.927 million on the same day 23 December 2017 when his daughter Misha Bharti was also charged by the Enforcement Directorate of having disproportionate assets. Lalu Prasad was convicted 23 December 2017 and sentenced on 6 January 2018 to 3 1/2 years' imprisonment and ₹1,000,000 fine for the fraudulent withdrawal of ₹8,900,000 from the Deoghar district treasury between 1990 and 1994.

==== 1996 Fodder Scam – 3rd case ====
This case, pertaining to scamming ₹356.2 million from the Chaibasa treasury of West Singhbhum district.

==== 1996 Fodder Scam – 4th case ====
Lalu Prasad was convicted by the special CBI court in the fourth fodder scam case relating to alleged withdrawal of ₹3.13 crore from the Dumka district treasury over two decades ago. CBI Judge awarded him two separate sentences of seven years each under the Indian Penal Code (IPC) and the Prevention of Corruption Acts.

==== 1996 Fodder Scam – 5th case ====
This case, pertaining to the scamming Lalu Prasad has been found guilty of illegal withdrawals of ₹139.35 crore from the Doranda treasury by a special CBI court in Jharkhand's Ranchi on 15 February 2022. In February 2022 A CBI court sentenced to five years jail term in fifth case and imposed a fine of ₹60 lakh.

==== 2005 Indian Railway tender scam ====
2005 Indian Railway tender scam better known as Land-for-Jobs Scam, investigated by the CBI, is the bribery and corruption case where Lalu Prasad and his family are charged for illegally receiving prime property from the bidder as a bribe for corruptly awarding the Railway tender during Lalu's tenure as Railway Minister. Transfer of these properties as bribe to Lalu and his children were disguised using the shell companies; for example, wife Rabri Devi and three children, Misha Bharti, Tejashwi Yadav and Tej Pratap Yadav, received Saguna Mor Mall property worth ₹45 crore through a shell company named Delight Marketing (renamed as Lara properties), and another shell company AB Exports was used to transfer properties worth ₹40 crore for a price of ₹4 lakh to Lalu's other three children Tejashwi Yadav, Ragini and Chanda. This case spawned several other related but independent cases, such as disproportionate assets case as well as tax avoidance case by ED. Under the Benami Transactions Prohibition Act recipient of such benami properties can be imprisoned for up to 7 years and fined up to 25% fair market value, and convicted politicians are barred from contesting elections or holding elected position for six years.

==== 2017 Delight Properties case ====
Investigated by the Enforcement Directorate (ED), against Lalu, his wife, son Tejashwi, daughter Misha and others, arose from the alleged illegal proceeds of the 2005 Indian Railway tender scam. The I-T department issued summons for 12 June 2017 to Misha Bharti, over Benami land deals worth ₹10 billion (₹1,000 crores). Misha was officially charged by ED in disproportionate assets case on the same day her father was convicted again in the second fodder scam. After the CBI lodged an FIR on 5 July 2017, ED filed the Case Information Report (ECIR) on 27 July 2017 against Lalu, his wife Rabri, their younger son Tejashwi Prasad Yadav and others in the railways tender corruption and ill-gotten property scam that happened during Lalu's tenure as the Railway Minister. Taking action against this scam, ED of Income Tax Department on 12 September 2017 attached more than 12 properties in Patna and Delhi including the plot for the mall in Patna, a farm house in Delhi and up-market land in Palam Vihar in Delhi. This includes the transfer of ₹450 million (₹45 crore) Seguna mor benami property transferred to Lalu's wife Rabri Devi and children Tejashwi Yadav and Tej Pratap Yadav by using a shell company named Delight Properties, which was later renamed as Lara Properties. (Updated: 7 Jan 2018)

==== 2017 AB Exports cases ====
AB Exports was a shell company used to transfer, as a bribe for the railway tender scam, ₹400 million (₹40 crore) benami property for a mere price of ₹400,000 to Lalu's 3 children Tejashwi Yadav, Ragini Yadav and Chanda Singh. ED has attached this property and booked the 3 accused children of Lalu. (Updated: 7 Jan 2018)

==== 2017 Patna zoo soil scam ====
2017 Patna zoo soil scam is an allegation/case against Lalu Prasad and his sons Tej Pratap Yadav and Tejashwi Yadav for the "gross irregularities" of selling soil from the construction of Tej Pratap's Saguna Mor mall basement. The bogus beautification scheme was for ₹90 lakh to Patna zoo without inviting any tenders when Tej Pratap was the minister of environment and forest in Bihar, a department that controls the zoo. The scam came to the light in April 2017, a public interest litigation (PIL) was filed in Patna High Court in October 2017, court ordered the Bihar government to furnish the details of investigation, following which the case was handed over to Bihar Vigilance Investigation Bureau (VIB) department for the investigation under the Pollution Control Board Act, the Environment Protection Act and Wildlife Protection Act (1972) (update: 6 Jan 2018).

The Bihar government said that official procedure was duly followed in the case and prima facie no evidence of irregularity has come into light in zoo soil deal. (Updated: 31 May 2020)

=== Bail ===
Lalu Prasad was convicted in the controversial Fodder Scam, and was serving a term until 17 April 2021, when he was granted bail from the Jharkhand High Court in the corruption scandal.

== Criticism ==
=== Corruption, nepotism and dynasticism ===
Lalu Prasad is one of the first noted politicians to lose parliamentary seat on being arrested in fodder scam as per Supreme Court decision banning convicted legislators to hold their posts. During his tenure as Chief Minister, Bihar's law and order was at lowest, kidnapping was on rise and private armies mushroomed. He was also criticized by opposition in the Shilpi-Gautam Murder case and the death of his daughter Ragini Yadav's friend, Abhishek Mishra, in mysterious circumstances.

=== Criticism on Yadavisation ===
Lalu's rule witnessed Yadav caste becoming assertive in the rural and urban landscape of Bihar, leading his opponents to coin the slogan of "Yadavisation" of Bihar's polity and administration. This fact was used by other political parties to dislodge his government on the charges of working for the benefit of a single caste group at the cost of various other backward communities. According to a report of Indian Human Development Survey (2011–12), Brahmins topped in average per capita income with ₹28,093, the other upper castes of Bihar which comprises Rajputs have an average per capita income of ₹20,655, closely followed by middle agrarian castes like Kushwahas and Kurmis earning ₹18,811 and ₹17,835 respectively as their average per capita income. In contrast, Yadavs' income is one of the lowest among OBCs at ₹12,314, which is slightly less than the rest of OBCs (₹12,617). Hence, despite the political mobilisation of backward castes in post mandal period, the upper-caste are still the highest income groups in Bihar. According to this report, the economic benefits of the Mandal politics could be seen as affecting only few backward castes of agrarian background leading to their upward mobilisation. The Yadavs hence transformed their assertiveness to the upward mobility in the politics only while the other "Backward Castes" gained momentum in the other fields, though still the upper-caste dominance was retained in upper echelon of bureaucracy.

== Writings ==
Lalu Prasad has written his autobiography named Gopalganj to Raisina Road.

== Filmography ==
- Padmashree Laloo Prasad Yadav (Bollywood), as himself (special appearance)
- Mahua (Bhojiwood)
- Gudri Ke Lal (Bhojiwood)

== In media ==
=== Books ===
- A writer named Neena Jha has written a book on Lalu Prasad named Lalu Prasad, India's miracle.
- Book named Laloo Prasad Yadav: A Charismatic Leader was published in 1996.
- "The Making of Laloo Yadav, The Unmaking of Bihar", updated and reprinted under the title "Subaltern Sahib: Bihar and the Making of Laloo Yadav", is a book based on Lalu's life by Sankarshan Thakur.

=== Films ===
- Padmashree Laloo Prasad Yadav, the Hindi-language film was released in 2005. It was based on a girl named Padmshree, her boyfriend Laloo, her lawyer Prasad and Yadav was Lalu Prasad himself as a special appearance.
- Bhojpuri film Lalten is a biopic based on the life of Lalu Prasad.

== See also ==
- List of politicians from Bihar
- History of Backward Caste movement in Bihar

Lok Sabha
Preceded by Ramshekhar Prasad Singh	Member of Parliament for Chapra; 1977–1980	Succeeded by Satya Deo Singh
Preceded by Rajiv Pratap Rudy	Member of Parliament for Chapra; 1989–1991	Succeeded by Lal Babu Rai
Preceded by Ram Bahadur Singh	Member of Parliament for Chapra; 2004–2009	Succeeded by Constituency does not exist
Preceded by Constituency does not exist	Member of Parliament for Saran; 2009–2013	Succeeded by Rajiv Pratap Rudy
Political offices
Preceded by Nitish Kumar	Minister of Railways; 25 May 2004 – 18 May 2009	Succeeded by Mamata Banerjee
Preceded by Jagannath Mishra	Chief Minister of Bihar; 1990–1997	Succeeded by Rabri Devi
