= Disproportionate assets =

Disproportionate assets is a concept in Indian law where a person in public office has accumulated significant unexplained wealth, accounting for both the assets they held previously and legal sources of income. Disproportionate assets cases are investigated by the CBI Central Bureau of Investigation and the Income Tax Department.

The concept is extensively used to initiate corruption investigations against public servants and elected politicians in India, and has been codified in several pieces of national- and state-level legislation, including the Prevention of Corruption Act, 1988.

On 29 September 2014, J Jayalalithaa, Chief Minister of Tamil Nadu, was convicted of disproportionate assets and was sentenced to jail for four years. This made Jayalalithaa the first sitting chief minister in India to be removed from office due to corruption charges. She was later acquitted on 11 May 2015 by the Karnataka High Court. On 14 February 2017, the Supreme Court of India over-ruled the Karnataka High Court. Sasikala and the other accused were convicted and sentenced to four years' imprisonment, as well as being fined ₹10 crore (equivalent to ₹11 crore or US$1.6 million in 2019) each. The case against Jayalalithaa was abated because she had died but fines were levied on her properties.
