= Nayagaon railway station =

Railway station in Saran, Bihar, India

Naya gaon railway station
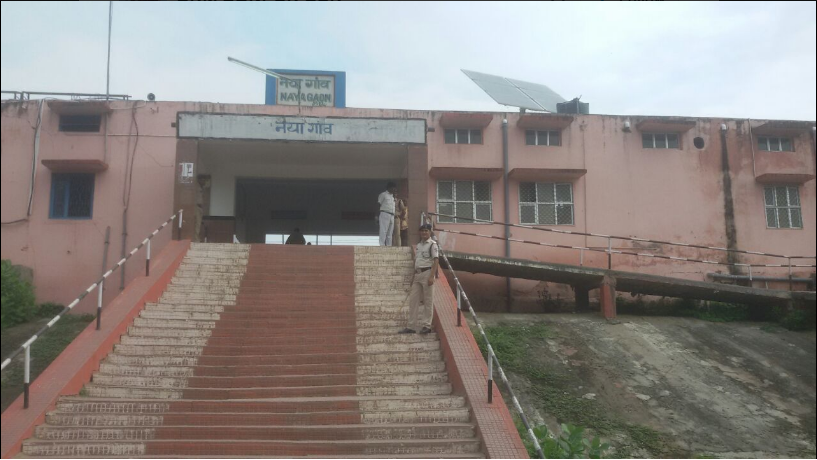
- Naya gaon, Sonpur

General information
- Location: Nayagaon, Bihar, Sonpur-841217; India
- Coordinates: 25.74°N 85.08°E
- Elevation: 56 metres (184 ft)
- System: Indian Railways station
- Owner: East Central Railway of the Indian Railways
- Operator: Indian Railways
- Lines: Barauni–Gorakhpur, Raxaul and Jainagar lines; Muzaffarpur–Gorakhpur line (via Hajipur, Raxaul and Sitamarhi); Barauni–Samastipur–Muzaffarpur–Hajipur line
- Platforms: 3
- Tracks: 6
- Connections: Hajipur

Construction
- Structure type: Standard (on ground station)
- Parking: Available

Other information
- Status: Functioning
- Station code: NYO
- Zone(s): East Central Railway
- Division(s): Sonpur

History
- Opened: 1972; 54 years ago
- Electrified: 2010; 16 years ago

Passengers
- 10,000 per day
Location

Naya gaon railway station, (Station code: NYO), is a railway station in Sonpur Block in Saran district in the Indian state of Bihar. One siding Railway line from Rail Wheel Plant, Bela plant site to Nayagaon station is under construction.

== Trains ==
Naya gaon falls under the jurisdiction of Sonpur railway division. Major trains pass through Nayagaon railway station(NYO):

- Lichchavi Express (Train no. 14006 / 05)
- Bagh Express (Train no. 13020)
- Sealdah Ballia Express (Train no 13106)

Trains between Nayagaon and Patliputra:

- Gorakhpur–Patliputra Passenger (Train no. 55008)
- Patliputra Gorakhpur Passenger (Train no. 55007)

Route between Nayagaon and Digha Bridge Halt: pathGoogle location

Trains running on Digha–Sonpur rail–road bridge between Sonpur and Patliputra are:

- Raxaul–Hajipur Intercity Express (Train no. 15202)
- Gorakhpur–Patliputra Passenger (Train no. 55042)
- Sonepur–Gorakhpur Passenger (Train no.55209)
- Patliputra–Barauni DEMU (Train no. 75216)
- Patliputra–Narkatiaganj Intercity (Train no. 25201)

== Gallery ==
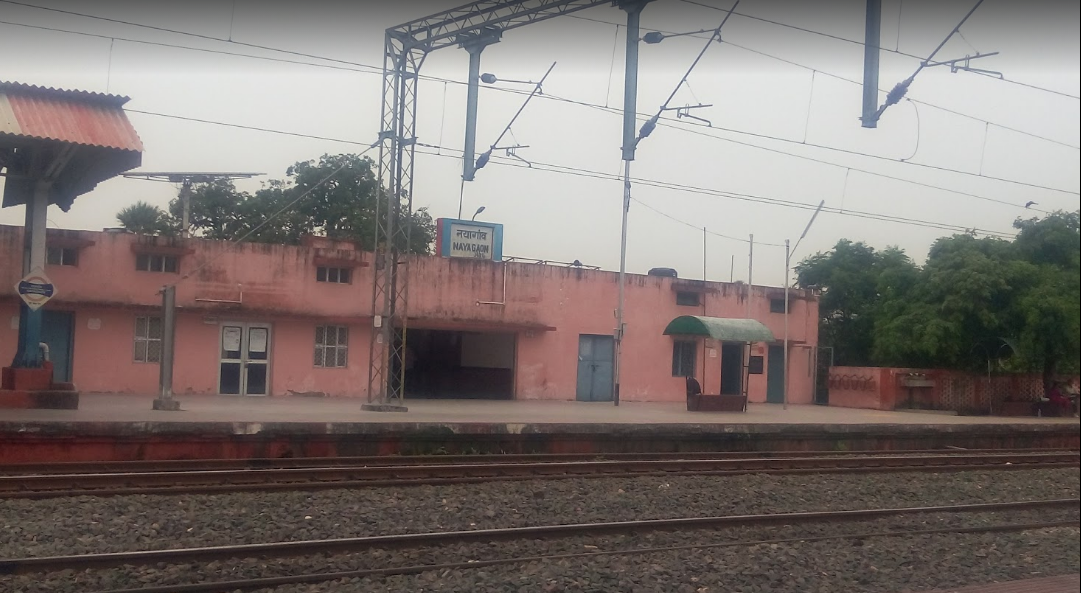
Nayagaon station 1

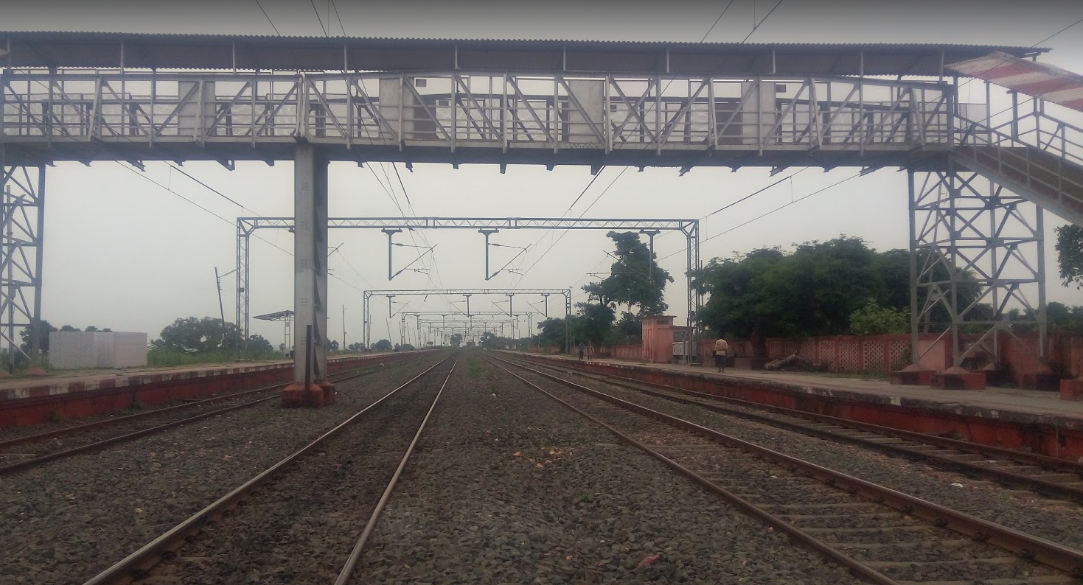
Nayagaon station 2

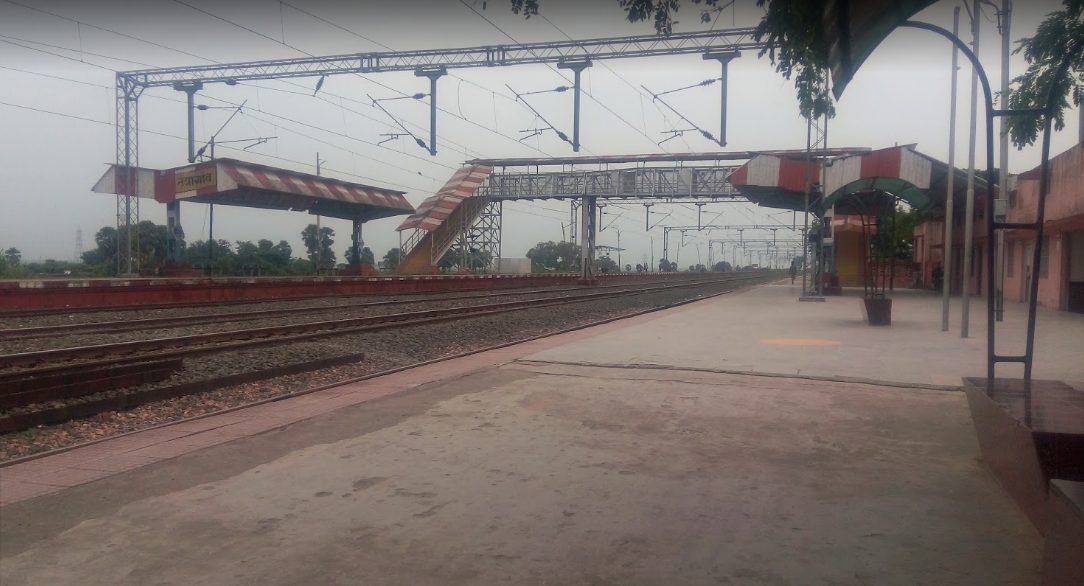
Nayagaon station 3

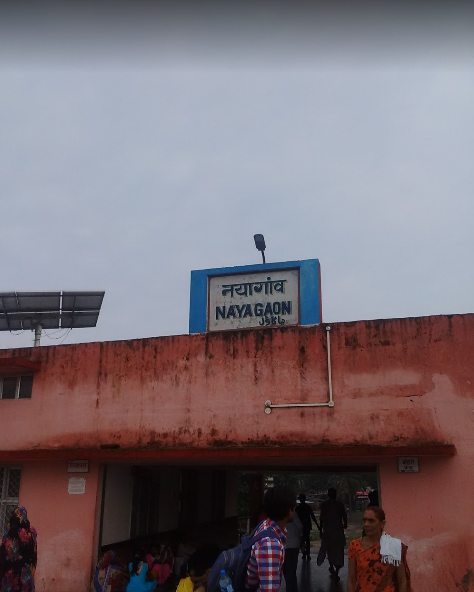
Nayagaon station 4

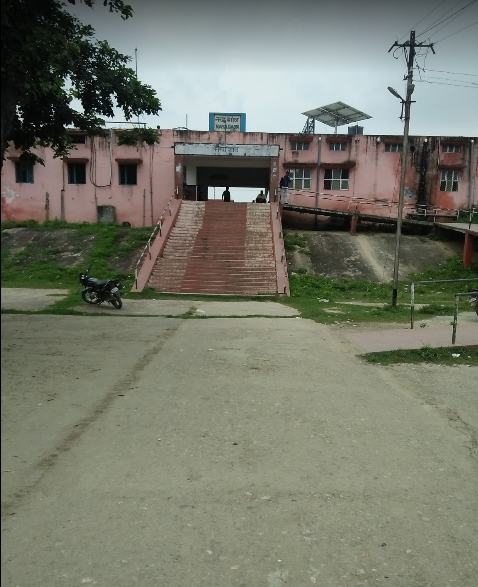
Nayagaon station 5

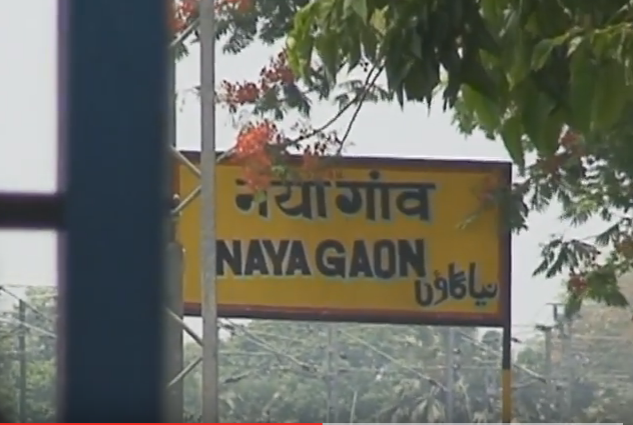
Nayagaon railway station 6

== Nearest railway station ==
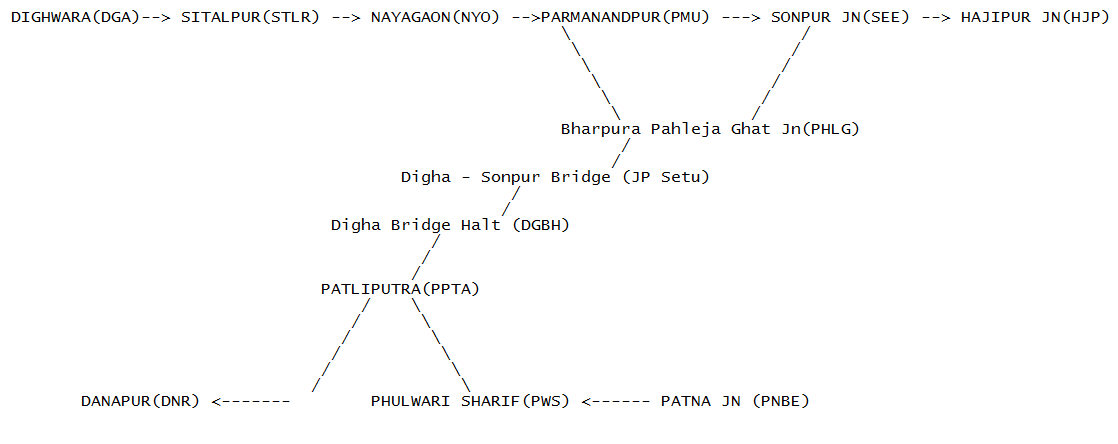
Danapur Sonpur division stations

The distance from nearby stations are:

S.No	Station	distance (in km)
1	Patliputra	20
2	Sonpur	11
3	Parmanandpur	4
4	Bharpura Pahlejaghat	9
5	Sitalpur	7
6	Dighwara	12
7	Digha Bridge Halt (DGBH)	15

== Facilities ==
The major facilities available are Waiting rooms, retiring room

=== Platforms ===
There are 3 platforms at Nayagaon railway station. The platforms are interconnected with three foot overbridge (FOB).
