= Shikarpur =

Shikarpur or Shakkarpur or Sikarpur may refer to the following places:

== India ==
- Shikarpur, Bihar (Vidhan Sabha constituency)
- Shikarpur, Gujarat, a village and Harappan archeological site in Kutch district of Gujarat
- Shikarpur, Shimoga, a town in Karnataka
- Shikarpur, Sultanpur Lodhi, a village in Kapurthala district of Punjab
- Shikarpur, Bulandshahr, a city and municipal board in Uttar Pradesh
  - Shikarpur (Assembly constituency), an assembly constituency in Uttar Pradesh
- Shikarpur, Muzaffarnagar, a town in Uttar Pradesh
- Shikarpur, Jaunpur, a village in Uttar Pradesh
- Shikarpur, Sonepur, a village in Uttar Pradesh
- Shikarpur, Najafgarh, a village in Delhi
- Sikarpur, Cooch Behar, a village in West Bengal

== Pakistan ==
- Shikarpur, Sindh, a city in Sindh Province
  - Shikarpur District, the district
  - Shikarpur railway station

== Others ==
- Shikarpur (web series), Indian web series
