= Sealdah–Ballia Express =

Train in India

Overview
- Service type: Express
- Locale: West Bengal, Jharkhand, Bihar & Uttar Pradesh
- First service: 6 January 2004; 22 years ago
- Current operator: Eastern Railway

Route
- Termini: Sealdah (SDAH); Ballia (BUI)
- Stops: 32
- Distance travelled: 680 km (423 mi)
- Average journey time: 15 hours 50 minutes
- Service frequency: Daily
- Train number: 13105 / 13106

On-board services
- Classes: AC 2 Tier, AC 3 Tier, Sleeper Class, Second Class Seating, General Unreserved
- Seating arrangements: Yes
- Sleeping arrangements: Yes
- Catering facilities: Available
- Observation facilities: Large windows
- Baggage facilities: Available
- Other facilities: Below the seats

Technical
- Rolling stock: LHB coach
- Track gauge: 1,676 mm (5 ft 6 in)
- Operating speed: 43 km/h (27 mph) average including halts.

The 13105 / 13106 Sealdah–Ballia Express is a express-type train of Indian Railways linking the city of Kolkata with Ballia district of Uttar Pradesh.

== Stoppage ==
This is a long-distance running express and covers its journey within a day. This train covers 669 kilometers at a speed of 40 km/h and through its journey it passes through important stations like:

- Sealdah
- Naihati
- Bandel
- Burdwan
- Durgapur
- Andal
- Asansol
- Chittaranjan
- Madhupur
- Jasidih
- Simultala
- Jhajha
- Gidhaur
- Jamui
- Mananpur
- Kiul
- Barhiya
- Barauni
- Vidyapatidham
- Mohiuddinnagar
- Shahpur Patoree
- Mehnar Road
- Desari
- Akshaywat Rai Nagar
- Hajipur
- Sonpur
- Nayagaon
- Sitalpur
- Dighwara
- Chhapra
- Suraimanpur
- Reoti
- Sahatwar
- Ballia

== Facility ==
This train features a 2AC, a 3AC, a HA-1 AC, Sleeper Class and general sitting type of coaches. All the classes except general class require prior reservation. Tatkal scheme is available in this train, whereas pantry car facility is unavailable. This train is very popular among travelers; as a result of this people have to book their tickets at least four months in advance and even in some cases the Tatkal tickets are unavailable due to their high demand. This is one of the most important trains in this route after Purvanchal Express via Mau.

== Train detail ==
Train No.	Sector	Departure	Arrival	Frequency	Stops	Distance
13105	Sealdah–Ballia Express	13:40	05:30	Daily	SDAH, ASN, JHJ, KUL, BRN, CHP, BUI, NYO, HJP, SEE	669 km
13106	Ballia–Sealdah Express	08:50	02:15	Daily	SDAH, ASN, JHJ, KUL, BRN, CHP, BUI, NYO, HJP, SEE	669 km

== Traction ==
As the route is fully electrified, it is now hauled by Sealdah based WAP 7 or Howrah-based WAP-4 throughout the entire journey. But sometimes Sealdah - Ballia Express is hauled by WAG-9 locomotive of different loco sheds.

== See also ==
- Eastern Railway zone
- Sealdah
- Ballia
