= List of villages in Sonpur block =

Sonpur is a tehsil/block in the Saran district of Bihar. The sub-district code of Sonpur block is 01267. There are about 91 villages in Sonpur block.

== List of Sonpur tehsil villages ==
- Abdul Hai
- Akilpur
- Apsaid
- Babhanganwan
- Badurahi
- Baijalpur
- Baijalpur Fakir
- Baijalpur Faqir
- Baijalpur Jamuni
- Baijalpur Kesho
- Baijalpur Tamuni
- Banwari Chak
- Baqarpur
- Barbatta
- Bariar Chak
- Bharanpura
- Chhitar Chak
- Chak Daria Sultanpur
- Chak Jujhari
- ChakDaria
- Chandpura
- Chaturpur
- Chausia
- Chhapra
- Chhitar Chak
- Chittu Pakar
- Chitarsenpur
- Damodarpur
- Dariyapur
- Dudhaila
- Dumari Buzurg
- Faqrabad
- Gangajal
- Garibpatti
- Gheghta
- Gobind Chak
- Gopalpur
- Hasanpur
- Hasilpur
- Ismail Chak
- Jahangirpur
- Jaitiya
- Jan Mohammad
- Kalyanpur
- Kapur Chak
- Karam Chak
- Kasmar
- Kasturi Chak
- Kharika
- Khemi Chak
- Khuntaha
- Ladanpur
- Lahlad Chak
- Lawang Patti
- Lodipur
- Mahammadali Chak
- Mahmud Chak
- Makhdumpur
- Makra
- Milki
- Mirzapur
- Mohabatpur
- Mohammadpur
- Murgia Chak
- Murthan
- Mustafa Chak
- Naudiha
- Nawada
- Naya Gaon
- Nazarmira
- Pahleza Ghat
- Parmanandpur
- Parvezabad
- Rahar Diyara
- Rahimpur
- Raipur Hasanpur
- Rajapur
- Ramsapur
- Rasen Chak
- Rasulpur
- Saidpur
- Sabalpur
- Salehpur
- Semara
- Shahpur
- Shekh Duman
- Shikarpur
- Sighinpur
- Siktia
- Sobhepur
- Sultanpur
