= Daksha yajna =

Hindu legend of the destruction of Daksha's sacrifice

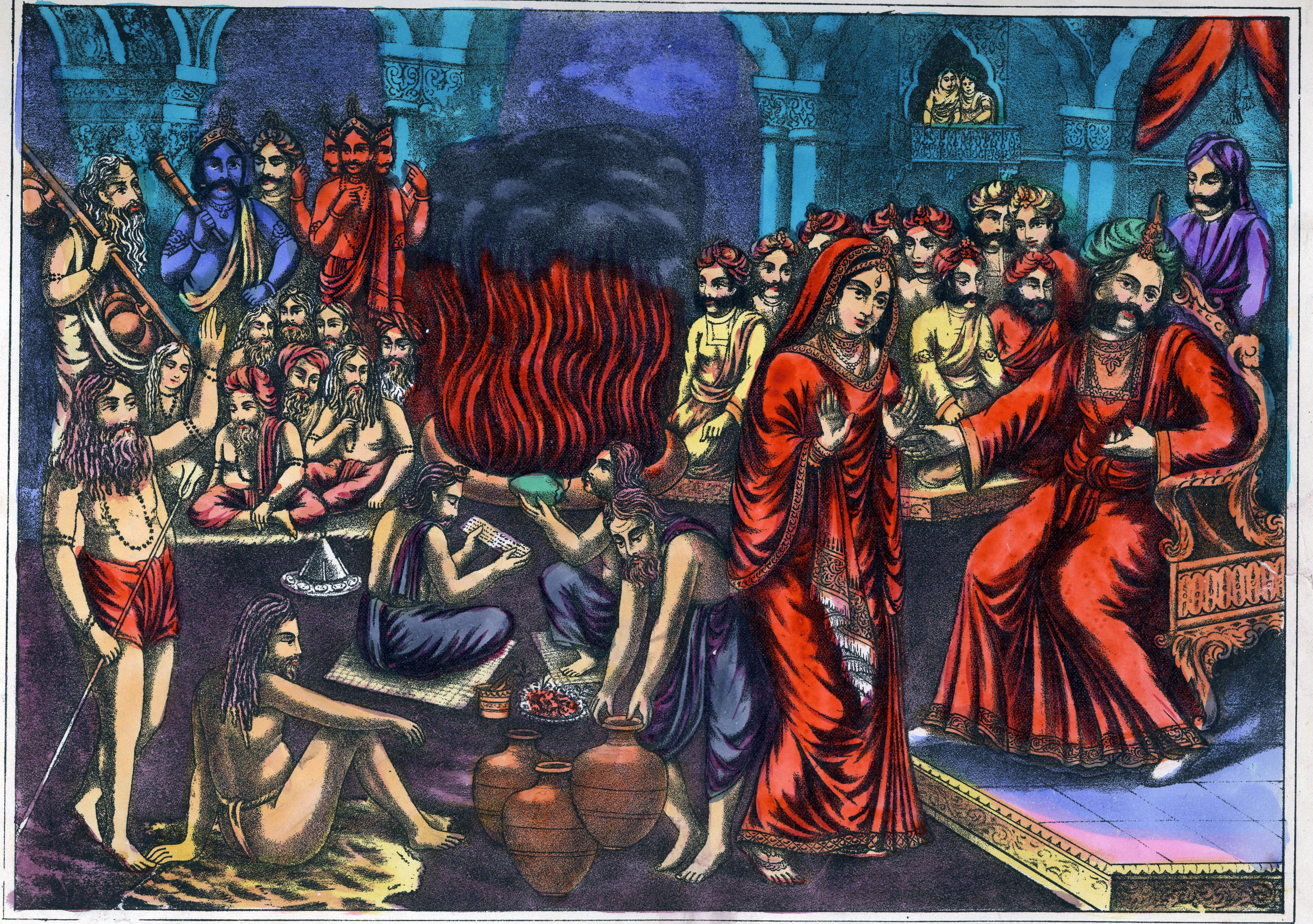
Sati confronts Daksha

Dakṣayajña (Note: Also rendered Daksha Yajna, Daksha Yajnam, Daksha Yagna, Daksha Yagnam, and Daksha Yaga) is an important event in Hindu mythology that is narrated in various Hindu scriptures. It refers to a yajna (ritual-sacrifice) organised by Daksha, where his daughter, Sati, immolates herself. The wrath of the god Shiva, Sati's husband, thereafter destroys the sacrificial ceremony. The tale is also called Daksha-Yajna-Nasha ("destruction of Daksha's sacrifice). The legend forms the liturgical basis of the establishment of the Shakta pithas, the temples of Mahadevi, the supreme deity of Shaktism. It also becomes a prelude to the legend of Parvati, Sati's reincarnation, who later marries Shiva.

The tale is mainly told in the Vayu Purana. It is also mentioned in the Kasi Kanda of the Skanda Purana, the Kurma Purana, Harivamsa Purana, and the Padma Purana. The Linga Purana, Shiva Purana, and Matsya Purana also detail the incident. Variations of the legend may be observed in later Puranas, each text lending a superior account to their supreme deity (depending on Vaishnava, Shaiva, and Shakta traditions) in their literature.

== Myth ==
=== Sati-Shiva marriage ===
Daksha was one of the Prajapati, a son of Brahma, and among his foremost creations. Daksha married Manu's daughter, Prasuti, sometimes equated with Asikni, another of Daksha's wives. Sati (also known as Uma) was his youngest daughter, and also his favourite.

Sati was deeply in love with the destroyer deity, Shiva, and wished to become his wife. Her worship and devotion of Shiva strengthened her immense desire to wed him. However, Daksha did not like his daughter's yearning for Shiva, mainly because he was a Prajapati and the son of the god Brahma; his daughter Sati was a royal princess. They were wealthy nobility, and their royal lifestyle was entirely different from that of Shiva. As a king, Daksha wanted to increase his influence and power by making marriage alliances with powerful kingdoms, and influential sages and deities.

Shiva, on the other hand, led a modest life. He lived among the downtrodden, wore tiger skin, smeared ashes on his body, had thick locks of matted hair, and was full of purity. His abode was Mount Kailash in the Himalayas. He embraced all living beings, and did not make any distinction between good souls and bad souls. The Bhutaganas, his followers, consisted of all kinds of ghosts, demons, ghouls, and goblins. He wandered through gardens and graveyards alike. As a consequence, Daksha had an aversion towards Shiva being his daughter’s companion. However, unlike Daksha, Sati loved Shiva as she had a revelation that Shiva was a powerful yogi. Sati won Shiva as her husband by undergoing severe austerities (tapas). Despite Daksha's disapproval, Sati married Shiva.

=== Brahma's yajna ===
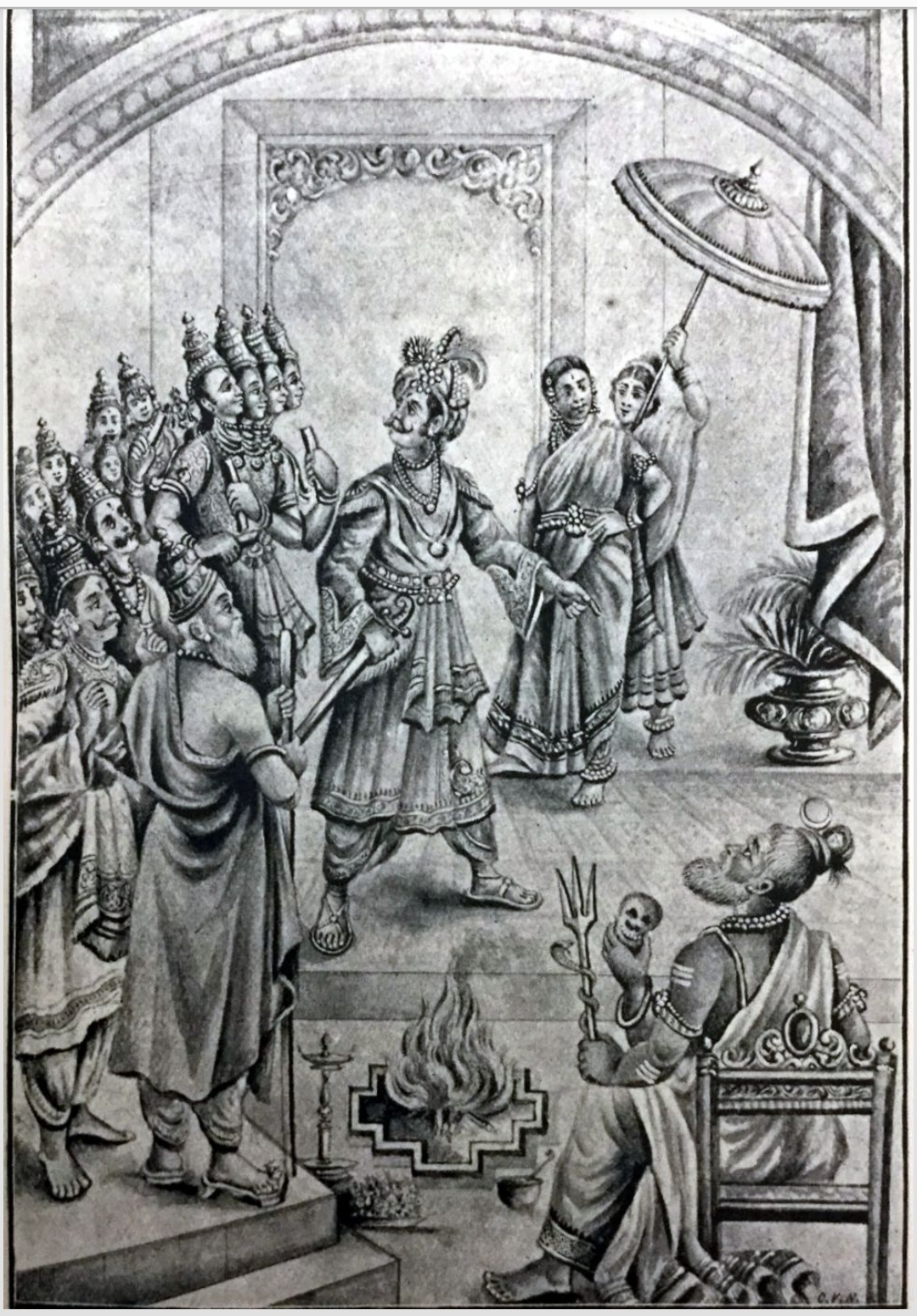
Daksha criticising Rudra for insulting him in the Satya Yuga

Once, Brahma conducted a huge yajna (ritual sacrifice), where all the Prajapatis, deities, and kings of the world were invited. Shiva and Sati were also called on to participate in the yajna. All of them came for the yajna and sat in the ceremonial place. Daksha came last. When he arrived, everyone in the yajna, with the exception of Brahma and Shiva, stood up, showing their reverence for him. Brahma, being Daksha's father, did not rise. Shiva, being Daksha's son-in-law, and also due to the fact that he himself was superior in stature to Daksha, remained seated. Daksha misunderstood Shiva’s gesture and considered this act an insult. Daksha vowed to take revenge on the insult in the same manner.

== Ceremony ==
Daksha’s grudge towards Shiva grew after Brahma's yajna. With the prime motive of insulting Shiva, Daksha initiated a great yajna, similar to that of Brahma. The Bhagavata Purana mentions its name as Brihaspatistava. The yajna was to be presided over by the sage Bhrigu. He invited all the deities, Prajapatis, and kings to attend the yajna, and intentionally avoided inviting Shiva and Sati. Despite being invited, Brahma and Vishnu decline to attend the yajna according to the Skanda Purana.

=== Dadhichi-Daksha argument ===
The Kurma Purana discusses the dialogues between the sage Dadhichi and Daksha. After the sacrifice and hymns were offered to the twelve Aditya deities; Dadhichi noticed that there was no sacrificial portion (Havvis) allotted to Shiva and his wife, and no Vedic hymns were used in the yajna addressing Shiva. He warned Daksha that he was not to alter the Vedas for his personal reasons; the priests and sages supported this. Daksha replied to Dadhichi that he would not do so, and insulted Shiva this very act. Dadhichi left the yajna because of this argument.

=== Death of Sati ===
Sati learned of the grand yajna organised by her father, and asked Shiva to attend the yajna. Shiva refused her request, saying that it was inappropriate to attend a function without being invited. He reminded her that they had not been invited intentionally. Sati was of the notion that there was no need for them to receive an invitation in order to attend, as she was Daksha’s favourite daughter, and no formality existed between them. She constantly pleaded with Shiva to let her attend the ceremony, and turned a deaf ear to her husband's reasoning. Relenting, Shiva allowed Sati to go to her parents' home, along with his followers, including Nandi, to attend the ceremony, but refused to accompany her. Sati cursed Daksha, warning that the wrath of Shiva would destroy him and his kingdom. Unable to bear further humiliation, Sati took her own life by jumping into the sacrificial fire. Other versions of the legend state that Sati, losing all control over her anger, takes upon the form of Adi Shakti or Durga, and curses Daksha to fall to ruin. She immolates her body using her own energy and returns to the Sarvaloka. The onlookers tried to save her, but it was too late. They were only able to retrieve the half-burnt body of Sati..

=== Destruction of the yajna by Shiva ===
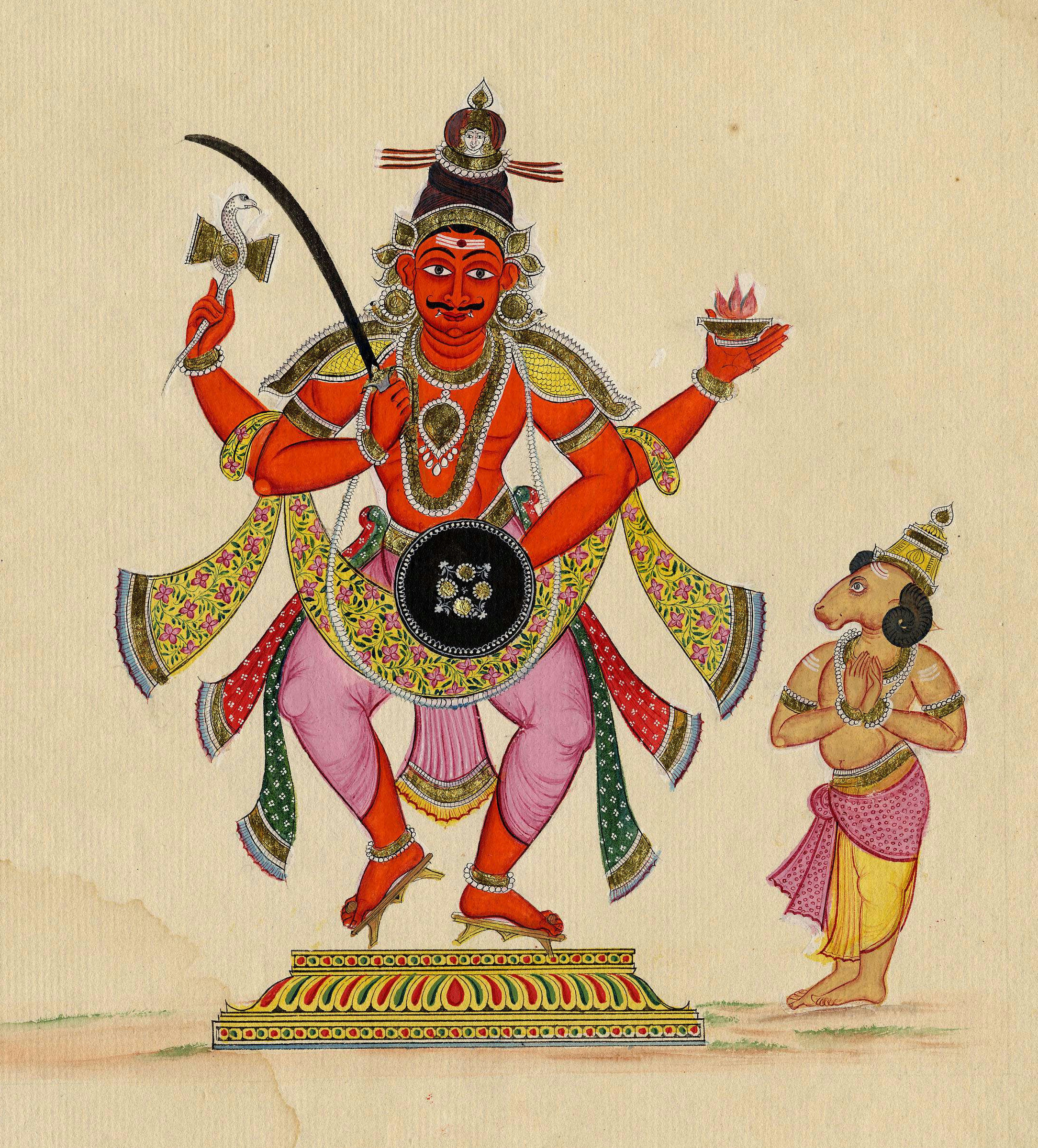
Virabhadra and Daksha

Shiva was deeply pained upon hearing of his wife's death. His grief grew into a terrible anger when he realised how Daksha's actions had contributed to his own daughter's demise. Shiva's rage became so intense that he plucked a lock of hair from his head and smashed it on the ground, breaking it into two with his leg. Armed and frightening, two fearsome beings, Virabhadra and Bhadrakali (Rudrakali) emerged. Shiva ordered them to kill Daksha and destroy the yajna.

The ferocious Virabhadra and Bhadrakali, along with the Bhutaganas, reached the yajna site. The invitees renounced the yajna and started running away from the turmoil. Sage Bhrigu created an army with his divine penance powers to resist Shiva’s attack and protect the yajna. Bhrigu’s army was demolished, and the premises were ravaged. All those who participated, even the other Prajapatis and the deities, were mercilessly beaten, wounded, or even slaughtered. The Vayu Purana mentions the attack of Bhutaganas: the tip of the nose of Saraswati and Aditi(the mother of devas) were cut, Yama's staff bone was broken, Mitra's eyes were pulled out, Indra was trampled by Virabhadra and the Bhutaganas, Pushan's teeth were knocked out, Chandra was beaten heavily, all of the Prajapatis' were beaten, the hands of Vahini were cut off, and Bhrigu's beard was cut off.

There are three differing accounts of the conclusion of this conflict, two of which leading to an intervention by Parabrahman or Vishnu, and one of which ends with Daksha's decapitation.

The Linga Purana and the Bhagavata Purana mention the decapitation of Daksha. Daksha was caught and decapitated, and the attack culminated when the Bhutaganas started plucking out Bhrigu’s white beard as a victory souvenir.

The Vayu Purana states that Daksha and Yajneshvara, the personification of yajna, took the form of an antelope, and jumped towards the sky. Virabhadra captured and decapitated him. Daksha begs mercy from the Parabrahman (the Ultimate Reality in Hinduism), who rises from the yajna fire, and forgives Daksha. The Parabrahman informs Daksha that Shiva was, in fact, a manifestation of Parabrahman. Daksha then becomes a great devotee of Shiva.

The Harivamsha Purana and the Kurma Purana describe a conflict between Vishnu and Shiva or Virabhadra. In the Kurma Purana, Vishnu engages in combat with Virabhadra upon Garuda, employing his Sudarshana Chakra. Virabhadra is able to fend off the attacks of the deity, and Brahma finally intervenes to put an end to the violence, by brokering a peace between Shiva and Daksha. In the Harivamsha, Vishnu catches hold of Shiva's throat, rendering it blue. Nandi strikes Vishnu's head with the Pinaka, leaving the preserver deity undeterred. When propitiated, Vishnu offers a portion of the sacrificial offerings to Shiva, restoring peace between the parties.

== Aftermath ==
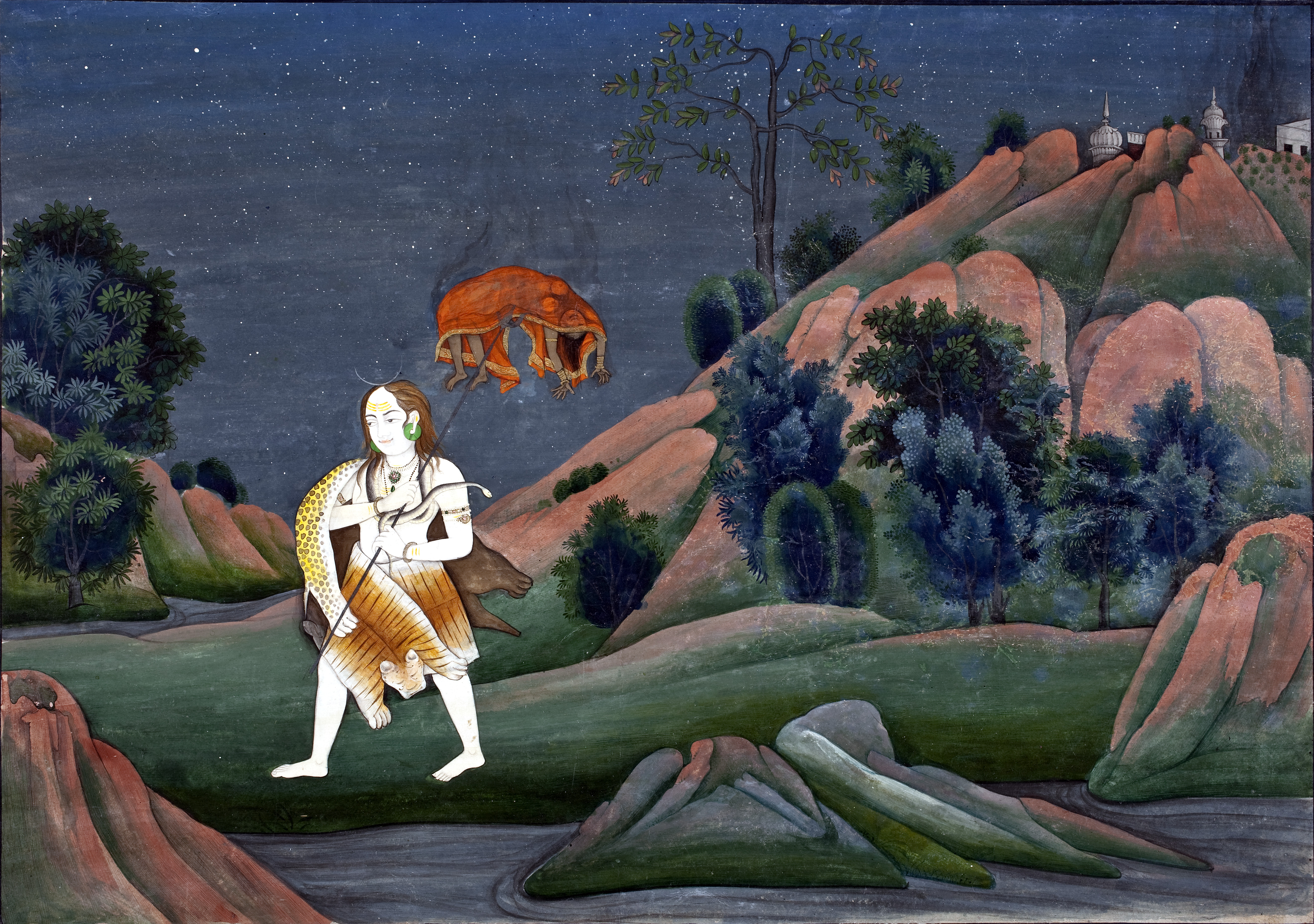
Shiva wandering around holding Sati's corpse

According to the Bhagavata Purana, since the obstruction of the yajna are held to create havoc upon all of nature, Brahma and Vishnu went to the grief-stricken Shiva. They comforted and showed their sympathy towards Shiva. They requested him to come to the yajna location, pacify the Bhutaganas, and allow the yajna to be completed. Shiva agreed. Shiva found the burnt body of Sati and permitted the continuation of the yajna. Daksha was absolved by Shiva, and the head of a goat was fixed on the decapitated body of Daksha, restoring his life. The yajna was completed successfully.

In Shakta Puranas like the Devi Bhagavata Purana, Kalika Purana, Shiva was distressed and could not part from his beloved wife. He took the corpse of Sati and wandered around the universe. To reduce Shiva's grief, Vishnu cuts Sati's corpse according to Vaishnava Puranas, whose parts fell on the places Shiva wandered. The Shaiva Puranas say that her body disintegrated on its own, and the parts fell while Shiva was carrying Sati's corpse to various places. These places commemorating each body part came to be known as the Shakta pithas.

Shiva went into isolation, and wandered all around the world, until Sati reincarnated as Parvati, the daughter of the King Himavana. Like Sati, Parvati took severe austerities, gave away all her royal privileges, and went to the forest. He eventually realised Parvati is Sati herself. Shiva tested her affection and devotion in disguise. Later, he wed Parvati.

== Shakta pithas ==
The legend of the Daksha Yajna is considered to be the reason behind the origin of Shakta pithas, Shiva walked in remorse with sati's corpse, as he walked her organs rot and fall off creating the Shakta pithas, which are the sacred abodes of Devi in Shaktism. These shrines are located all over South Asia. Most of the temples are located in India and Bangladesh; there are also a few shrines in Pakistan, Nepal and Sri Lanka. There are 54 Shakta pithas as per the Puranas, including:

- Sharada Pitha (Saraswati)
- Varanasi Pitha (Vishalakshi)
- Gaya Pitha (Sarvamangala)
- Jwalamukhi Pitha (Jwalamukhi)
- Prayaga Pitha (Madhaveshwari)
- Kamakhya Kamarupa Pitha (Kamakhya)
- Draksharama Pitha (Manikyamba),
- Oddyana Peetha (Girija Viraja)
- Pushkarini Peetha (Puruhutika)
- Ujjain Pitha (Mahakali)
- Mahur Ekaveera Peetha (Renuka),
- Kolhapur Sri Peetha (Mahalakshmi),
- Srisailam Peetha (Bhramarambika),
- Yogini Peetha (Jogulamba),
- Mysuru Krouncha Peetha (Chamundeshwari)
- Kanchipuram Kamakoti Peetha (Kamakshi)
- Thirukonamalai Lanka Pitha (Shankari) .

== Commemoration ==
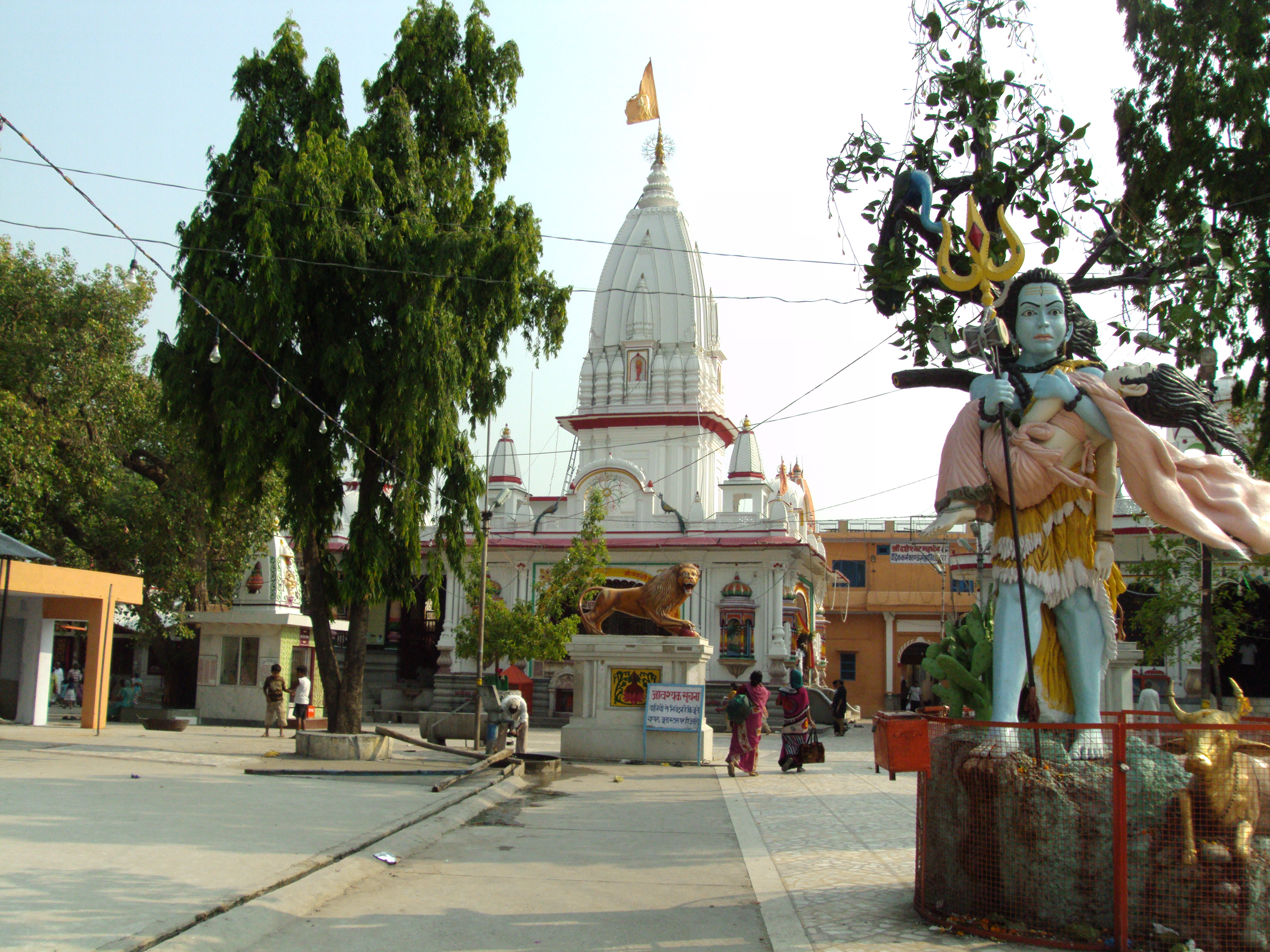
Daksheswara Mahadev Temple with Shiva carrying Sati's corpse (rightmost).

Various sites like Kottiyoor, Kerala; the Aami Mandir of Chhapra in Bihar the Daksheswara Mahadev Temple of Kankhal in Uttarakhand, and Draksharama, in Andhra Pradesh claim to be the location of Daksha yajna and the self-immolation of Sati.

Kottiyoor Vysakha Mahotsavam, a 27‑day Yajna ceremony, conducted in the serene hilly jungle location of Kottiyoor yearly commemorating the Daksha Yaga. The pooja and rituals were classified by Shri Sankaracharya.
