= Kalyanpur, Saran district =

Kalyanpur village
- Village
- Country: India
- State: Bihar
- District: Saran
- Block: Sonpur
- Gram Panchayat: Kalyanpur

Area
  - Total: 10 km^{2} (3.9 sq mi)
- Elevation: 43 m (141 ft)

Population
  - Total: 3,608
  - Density: 360/km^{2} (930/sq mi)
- Time zone: UTC+5:30 (IST)
- ISO 3166 code: IN-BR

Kalyanpur is a small village located in the Sonpur tehsil (block) of Saran district of the state of Bihar, India. It has an altitude of 43 meters (141 ft). Kalyanpur village is situated 8 km (4 mi) away from the sub-district headquarters of Sonpur and 47 km (29 mi) away from the district headquarters of Chhapra. As per 2009 stats, Kalyanpur is the gram panchayat of Kalyanpur village. Near the Gularia Chowk is the small market in Kalyanpur village. Sonpur is the nearest town, at approximately 8 km away from Kalyanpur. Kalyanpur village is connected by Sonpur Darihara Rewaghat road to Gandak baandh road.

== Geography ==
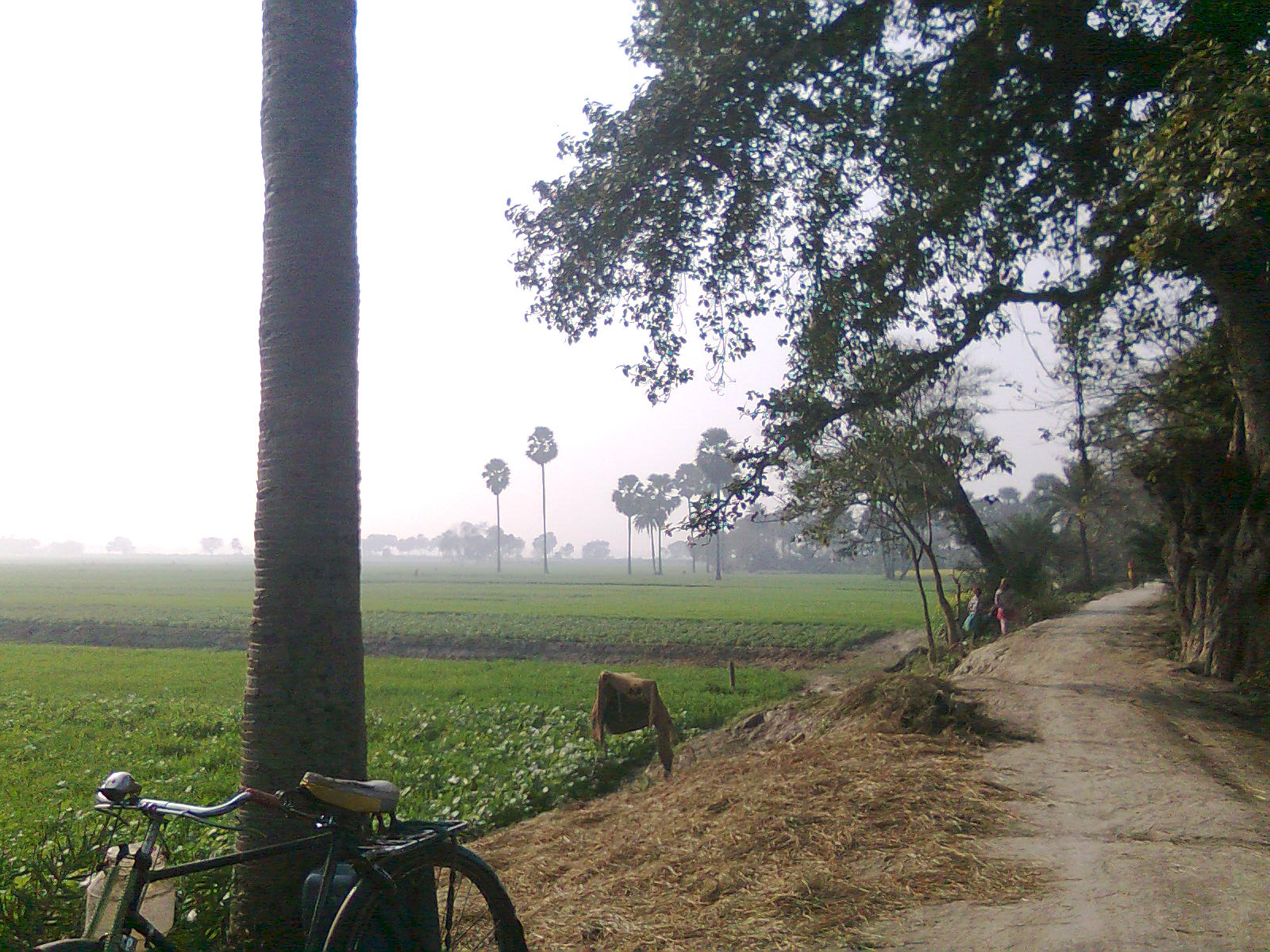
Kalyanpur village farms

Kalyanpur village is located about 8 km (4 mi) north of Sonpur city. It has an area of 100 hectares. It is at an altitude of 43 meters (141 ft). Most of the village is agricultural land, with rice and wheat as the main crop. Due to variations in annual rainfall, local farmers cannot depend on seasonal rain and instead use unlined perennial wells for irrigation. The village is near the Gandak river used of agriculture and other purposes.

== Demographics ==
As of the 2011 India census, Kalyanpur had a population of 3,608. Males constituted 52% of the population and females 48%. Kalyanpur had an average literacy rate of 70%, higher than the national average of 59.5%: male literacy was 74%, and female literacy was 62%. In Kalyanpur, 4.5% of the population was under 5 years of age. There were 597 houses in Kalyanpur village.

The nearest village is Shikarpur.

== Transportation and connectivity ==
Kalyanpur has good road communications due to development efforts by the government. A railway station is at Sonpur, about 8 kilometres (4 mi) from the village.

== Infrastructure ==
Kalyanpur village has a comprehensive electricity supply but not a regular power supply. Due to efforts of local governing bodies, solar panels have been introduced to provide power for street lighting.

== See also ==
- Sonpur
