= Aami Mandir =

Hindu temple in India

Aami Temple
- Location in Bihar

Religion
- Affiliation: Hinduism
- District: saran
- Deity: Sati, Ambika Bhavani, Shiva
- Festivals: Durga Puja, Aami Mela, Shivaratri, Dusshera

Location
- Location: Dighwara
- State: Bihar
- Country: India
- Coordinates: 25.60531°N 85.20629°E

Architecture
- Type: Mandir, Yagya Kund
- Creator: Raja Daksha Prajapati
- Completed: Dvapara Yuga
- Inscriptions: Wall painting

Aami Mandir, also known as Ambika Bhawani Temple, is considered as a Shakta pitha. It is a Hindu temple of the Goddess Sati, located at Ami, a prominent village in Dighwara of Saran District in Bihar, India.

The temple is equidistant from Lord Shiva’s Pashupatinath temple in Kathmandu, Vishwanath temple in Varanasi and Baidyanath Dham in Deoghar.

== Transportation ==
The nearest airport is Jayprakash Narayan Airport patna at a distance of about 57 km from the temple. The Aami Village lies on the roadside of NH 19. It connects with the major cities of Uttar Pradesh, and Bihar. Dighwara is the nearest railway station from Aami, which is about 2.5 km from the village.
