= Sonpur community development block =

Sonpur सोनपुर सामुदायिक विकास प्रखंड
- Community development block
- Location in Bihar, India
- Coordinates: 25.73°N 85.18°E
- Country: India
- State: Bihar
- District: Saran

Government
  - Type: Community development block

Area
  - Total: 159.65 km^{2} (61.64 sq mi)
- Elevation: 43 m (141 ft)

Population (2011)
  - Total: 232,340
  - Density: 1,455/km^{2} (3,770/sq mi)

Languages
  - Official: Bhojpuri, Hindi
- Time zone: UTC+5:30 (IST)
- Postal code: 841101
- ISO 3166 code: IN-BR
- Lok Sabha constituency: Saran
- Vidhan Sabha constituency: Sonpur (Vidhan Sabha constituency)
- Website: Sonpur block, Saran website, under Integrated Block Information system

Sonpur Community development block (C.D. block; Hindi: सोनपुर सामुदायिक विकास प्रखंड) is a rural area earmarked for administration and development in Saran district. The area is administered by a block development officer. It is the second largest block of Saran district in terms of population. A community development block covers several gram panchayats, panchayat samiti, Primary Agricultural Co-operative societies (PACS) and other local administrative unit at the village level. It is represented by Sonpur Vidhan Sabha constituency in Bihar Legislative Assembly and Saran Lok Sabha constituency in Indian parliament.

Currently, C.D. blocks are administrative units of 3rd level in Bihar state of India (equal to tehsils in other states). Sonpur nagar panchayat was established in 2002. The civic body election in Sonpur nagar panchayat was held in May 2017. The term of office-bearers is five years.

The real estate land prices soared in Sonepur after the start of construction of Digha–Sonpur rail–cum–road bridge in 2002. Real estate companies like RAV Solutions PVT Ltd, TCW Realty PVT Ltd, and Phenomenal Projects are acquiring large chunks of land and selling it in small plots.

Sonpur block (प्रखण्ड) has 98 villages. Sonpur Sub-division (अनुमंडल) consists of Sonepur, Parsa, Garkha, Dighwara, and Dariapur blocks. Sonpur block has 23 village panchayats and 73 villages.

== Demographics ==
Religion in Sonpur block
Religion	Percent
Hindus	96%
Muslims	3%
Others	1%

Sonpur block has a population of 232,340. 14% of the people live in urban areas while 86% live in rural areas. Currently there are 20 community development blocks in the district. As of the Ministry of Drinking Water and Sanitation 2009 report and 2011 Census, these were the findings.

Block name	SC	ST	General and OBC	Total
Sonpur	22400	79	209861	232340

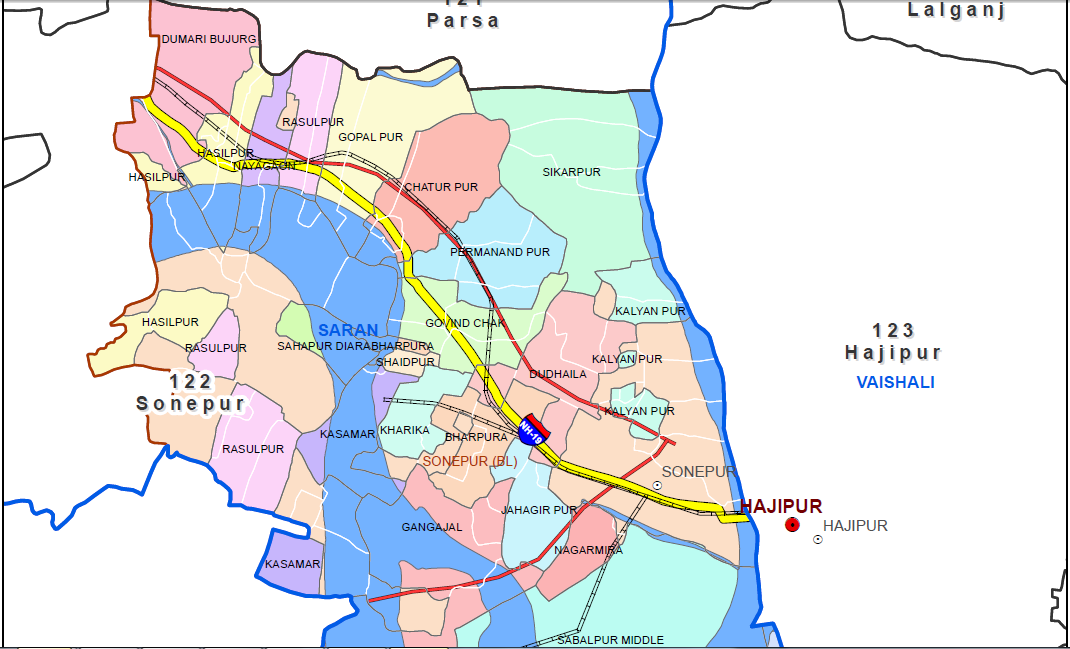
Sonpur block in Saran

== Gram panchayats ==
Sonpur block has one nagar Panchayat and 23 gram panchayats. Number of villages is 116. They are:

1. Dumri Bujurg
2. Hasilpur
3. Nayagaon
4. Rasulpur
5. Gopalpur
6. Chaturpur
7. Parmanandpur
8. Govindchak
9. Saidpur
10. Kasmar
11. Kharika
12. Gangajal
13. Bharpura
14. Shahpur Diyara
15. Jahangirpur
16. Dudhaila
17. Shikarpur
18. Kalyanpur
19. Najarmira
20. Sabalpur Uttari
21. Sabalpur Pashchimi
22. Sabalpur Madhyavarti
23. Sabalpur Purvi
