= Sonepur Cattle Fair =

Cattle fair held on Kartik Poornima in Sonepur, Bihar

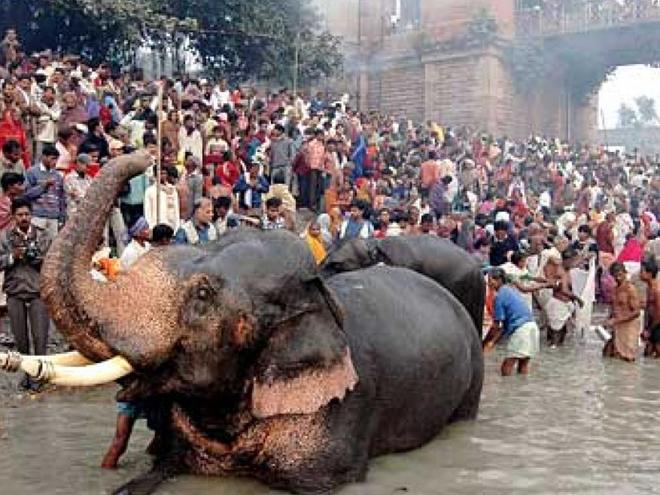
- Sonepur Cattle Fair
- Genre: Religious
- Dates: November - December
- Begins: Kartik Poornima
- Frequency: Annually
- Location: Sonepur
- Coordinates: 25.69°N 85.18°E
- Country: India
- Established: During Vedic Period
- Participants: Hindu
- Attendance: >2,500,000-3,000,000
- Major events: Cultural Programs, Shopping, Regional and Indian Food, Quality Woolen and Kashmiri dresses, Adventurous Rides and many more.
- Organiser: Bihar State Tourism Development Corporation
- Website: https://tourism.bihar.gov.in/

Sonepur Cattle Fair is held on Kartik Poornima (the full moon day) over the months of November and December in Sonepur, Bihar, on the confluence of river Ganges (Gandak). It is also known as Harihar Kshetra Mela. To date, it is the biggest cattle fair in Asia and usually lasts from between fifteen days to one month in duration. The Sonepur Cattle Fair used to attract traders from places as far away as Tamil Nadu and Delhi. In 2018, the Fair started on the 21st of November and continued until the 22nd of December.

== History ==
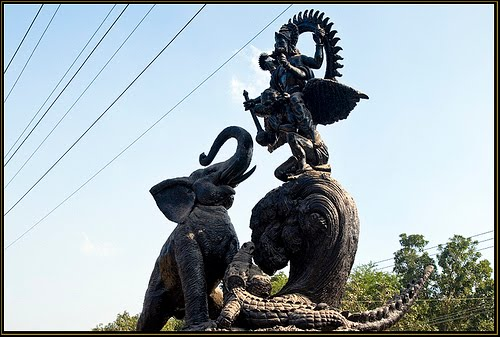
Lord Vishnu with Gaj and Grah

Originally, the venue of the fair was Hajipur and only the performance of the puja used to take place at the Harihar Nath temple of Sonpur. However, under the rule of the Mughal Emperor Aurangzeb, the venue of the fair got shifted to Sonpur. The temple of Harihar Nath is believed to have been originally built by Lord Rama, on his way to the court of King Janak to win the hand of Mata Sita. It is further said that Raja Man Singh later got the temple repaired. The Harihar Nath temple, as it stands today, was built by Raja Ram Narain, an influential person during the late Mughal period.

Gajendhra Moksha legendnto an elephant and a crocodile respectively by the curse of great sages Agasthya and Dewala muni. One day the elephant's leg was caught by the crocodile. It is said that the location was in Nepal. It is said that both of them fought hard for many years with their herds and while fighting, they came to the place near this temple. But ultimately the King Elephant weakened and took the lotus flower from river in its trunk and prayed to the supreme god Vishnu (Hari) to save him. Vishnu heard his prayer and cut down the crocodile with his Chakra. But the touch of the chakra released Huhu from the curse. Vishnu also released Indrayamuna from his curse and took him to his abode Vaikuntha.

Since Sonpur is situated at the convergence of the sacred rivers Ganges and Gandak, the Hindus regard it as a holy site. One of the purposes of the people visiting the Sonpur Cattle Fair, apart from the fair, is to take a holy dip at the convergence and pay respects at the Hariharnath Temple.

== The Fair Trade ==
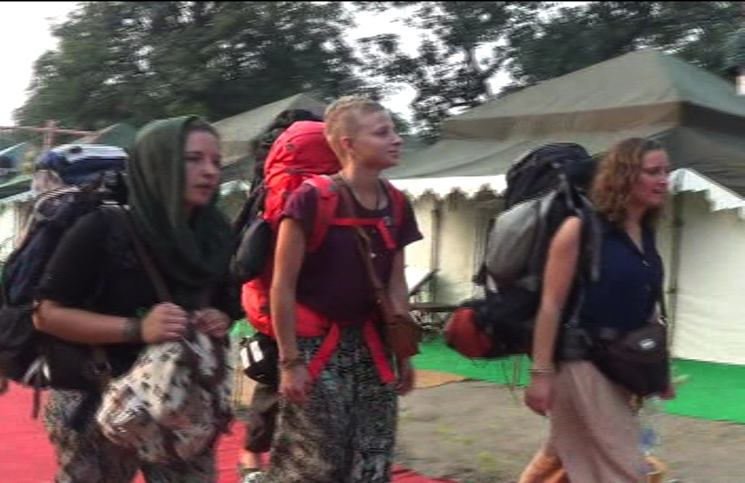
Foreign tourists at Sonpur Mela.

Many farm animals can be bought at the Sonpur mela from all breeds of dogs, buffaloes, donkeys, ponies, Persian horses, rabbits, goats and even the occasional camel. Many varieties of birds and poultry are also available. The area that attracts all, however, is the Haathi Bazaar where elephants are lined up for sale. The Sonpur Fair is the only place where such a large number of elephants are traded — although they cannot legally be sold. Numerous stalls are also set up at the grounds of the Sonpur Cattle Fair. Trade in elephants has been prohibited at Sonpur Mela since 2004 owing to strict enforcement of Wildlife Protection Act, 1972 and further denial of transfer of ownership certificate to the elephant owners. One will find a wide variety of goods in these stalls, ranging from garments, to weapons and furniture, toys, utensils and agricultural implements, jewelry and handicrafts. A major attraction is the sight of numerous elephants, beautifully decorated for the purpose of sale. In 2001, the number of elephants brought to Sonpur Mela was 92, 354 elephants in 2004, while in 2016, 13 elephants made it to the fair, only for display, not for sale. In 2017, there were 3 tuskers at the fair. In 2017, the Central Government banned the sale of cattles under the Prevention of cruelty to Animal Rules at Sonepur cattle fair.

A 'railgram' stall is set up by Railways, where toy train is also erected for children. Sonpur Mela continues to attract foreign tourists who arrive with the motive of capturing various elements of rural settlement. Apart from the photo opportunity, elephants continue to lure most foreign tourists. Swiss cottages are set up by Bihar State Tourism Development Corporation (BSTDC) at the Sonpur fair, with facilities of Internet facility, motor boat ride in river Gandak, food at the tourist village and pre-paid taxis from Patna Airport to Sonpur fair. Disneyland park is set up during the Sonpur Mela.

== Info ==
Harihar Kshetra Sonpur Mela in Official Records
Year	Elephants	Horses	Ox
2001	92	15,035	1,00,000
2004	354	15,035	1,32,754
2007	77	8,580	8,186
2014	39	5,580	1,00,000
2015	17	4,580	1,00,000
2016	13	4,020	1,00,000
2017	3	5,400	1,00,000

Duration: One Month (approximately in Month of November — December)

Cycle: Yearly

In 2013, the Fair started on November 16 and continued till December 15.

2018 Sonpur Harihar Kshetra Mela will commence from 21 November and finish on 22 December. It will be for 32 days. The fair will include events like boat racing, Dangal, water surfing, Water Bath Canning.

== Transportation ==
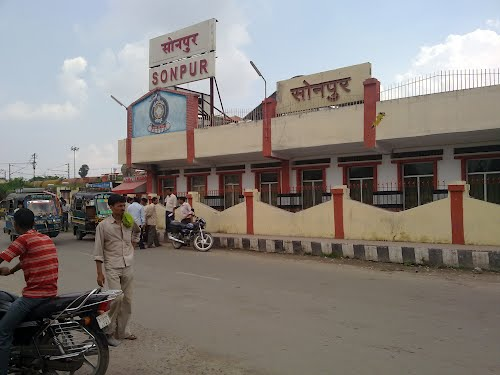
Sonpur railway station

Sonpur is easily accessible by Roadways and Railways. Moreover, it is only 25 kilometers from Bihar's Capital Patna, which is well connected by Airways, Railways and Roadways to the other parts of the country. During the time of Fair, BSTDC also organizes Ferries from Patna to Sonpur. There are various taxi and car rental services that provide private transport to expats, tourists, with driver to Sonpur mela and back.

== See also ==
- Pushkar Fair
