= Nayagaon, Bihar =

Nayagaon Naya ganw
- semi-urban area
- Location in Bihar, India Nayagaon (India)
- Coordinates: 25.74°N 85.08°E
- Country: India
- State: Bihar
- District: Saran

Government
  - Type: Local Village Body
  - Body: Gram Panchayat
  - MLA: Dr Ramanuj Prasad(RJD)
  - Member of Parliament: Rajiv Pratap Rudy

Area
  - Total: 2.09 km^{2} (0.81 sq mi)

Population (2011)
  - Total: 8,575
  - Density: 4,102/km^{2} (10,620/sq mi)

Languages
  - Official: Maithili; Bhojpuri; Hindi
- Time zone: UTC+5:30 (IST)
- PIN: 841217
- ISO 3166 code: IN-BR
- Nearest city: Sonpur
- Vidhan Sabha constituency: Sonpur
- Lok Sabha constituency: Saran
- Civic agency: Nayagaon Panchayat

Nayagaon is a semi-urban area in Sonpur Block in Saran in Bihar, India. Nayagaon is part of Sonpur (Vidhan Sabha constituency) and Saran (Lok Sabha constituency). New townships are being built in Nayagaon, N G Town by Phenomenal Projects Pvt., The Sai Green Mega Township Project by TCW (The Corporate World) Realty under Greater Patna Project, Natural City by Bold India Infra Private Limited Devkripa Green city Shital Green City Project Of Shital Buildtech Pvt Ltd, Kazari infra tech pvt ltd, Rav Residency and Aryavart Group. The distance of Nayagaon to Patna(Patliputra) has been reduced from earlier 45 km to 15 km due to Digha–Sonpur rail–road bridge. Nayagaon is located on NH 19, Nayagaon Sarai. Nayagaon is located at Mouza/Mauja Rasulpur. It is located along river Ganges. It is also near the under construction Hajipur-Chhapra-Ghazipur four-lane Highway (NH 31). The distance to AIIMS Patna in Phulwari Sharif is also reduced due to Digha-AIIMS elevated highway (Patli Path). Census code of Nayagaon is 234491. A power sub-station became functional in Nayagaon under Deen Dayal Upadhyaya Gram Jyoti Yojana in August 2020. An ITI (Industrial training institute) is also planned in Nayagaon. Nayagaon is 12 km from Rail Wheel Plant, Bela, Dariapur Block in Saran. A stadium is being constructed at the cost of Rs 55 lakhs in the sports ground of Gogal Singh Intermediate College, Nayagaon. An inter-modal terminal at Kalughat, Nayagaon is being constructed as part of National Waterway 1 under the government's Jal Marg Vikas project.

== Naya gaon railway station ==
Nayagaon falls under the jurisdiction of Sonpur railway division. Route between Nayagaon and Digha Bridge Halt: pathGoogle location

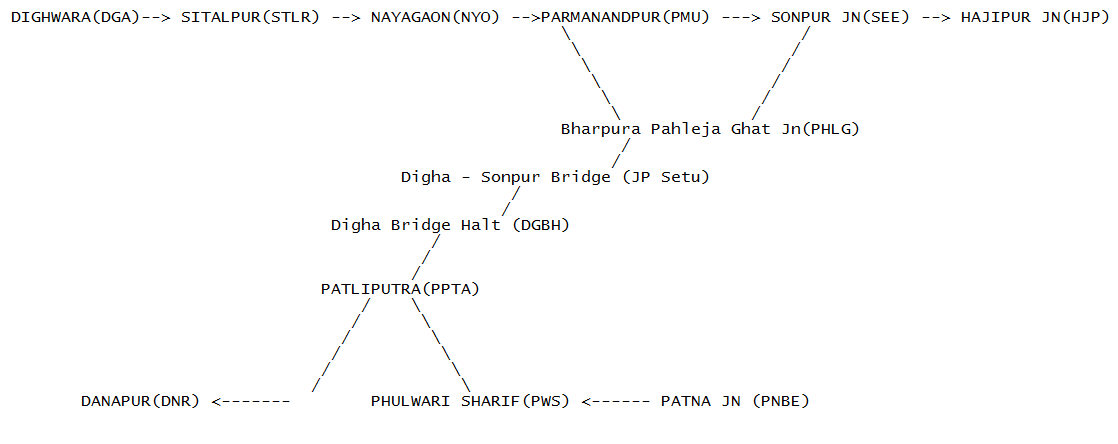
Danapur Sonpur division stations

== Important landmarks ==
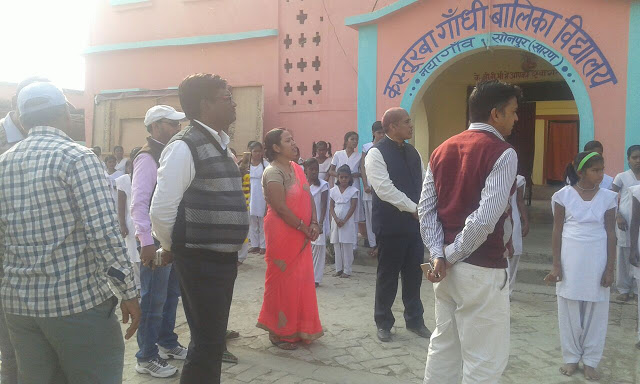
Kasturba Gandhi Balika Vidyalaya nayagaon sonpur

Nayagaon has a good market.

- State Bank of India, Nayagaon Branch (004862), Saran, Bihar – IFSC Code-SBIN0004862
- Gogal Singh Intermediate College, Nayagaon
- Kasturba Gandhi Balika Vidyalaya (KGBV), Nayagaon
- Sant Ravidas Bhavan
- Kaalratri Temple, Dumri Buzurg, Nayagaon.
- St. Kevin's Academy, Nayagaon
- Raghubir Singh High School, Mahadalichak, Nayagaon
- Devki Nand senior secondary school Nayagaon
- Upgraded Middle School (Ums) Baherwa Gachi School, Nayagaon.
- SAHID RAJENDRA DWAR

== Demographics ==
The population of Nayagaon is 8,575 as per 2011 census. The sex ratio is 924 females per 1000 males. Area of Nayagaon is 209 hectares.

Area	SC	ST	General and OBC	Total
Naya ganw	1167	1	7407	8575

== Nayagaon Panchayat ==
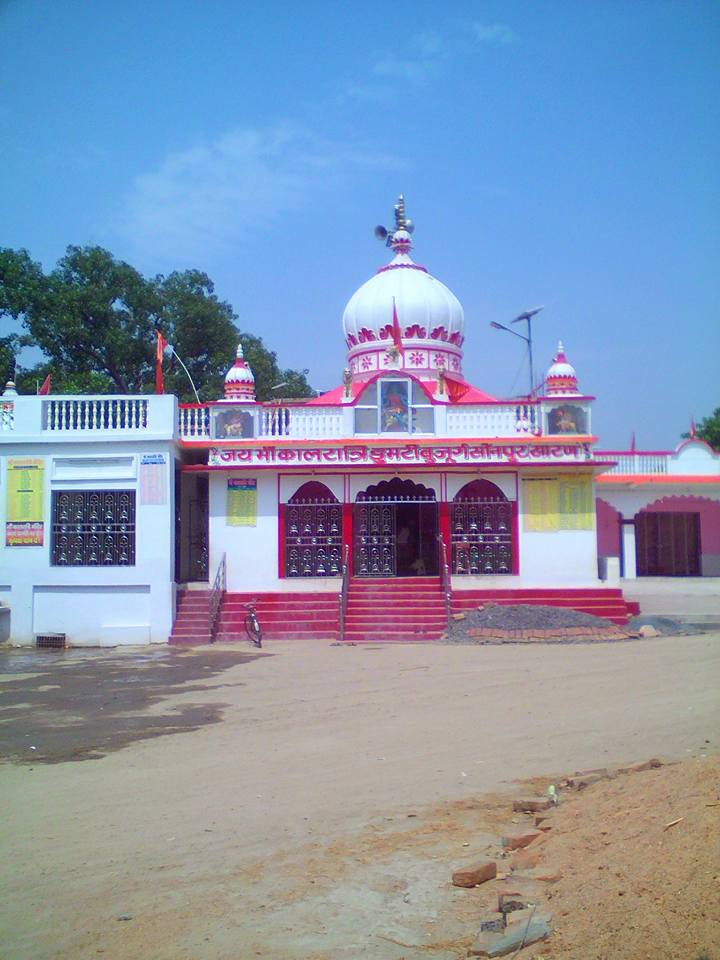
Kaalratri Temple Dumri Buzurg Nayagaon Saran Bihar

Panchayat Elections in Sonepur were held in June 2016.

== Nayagaon Police Station ==
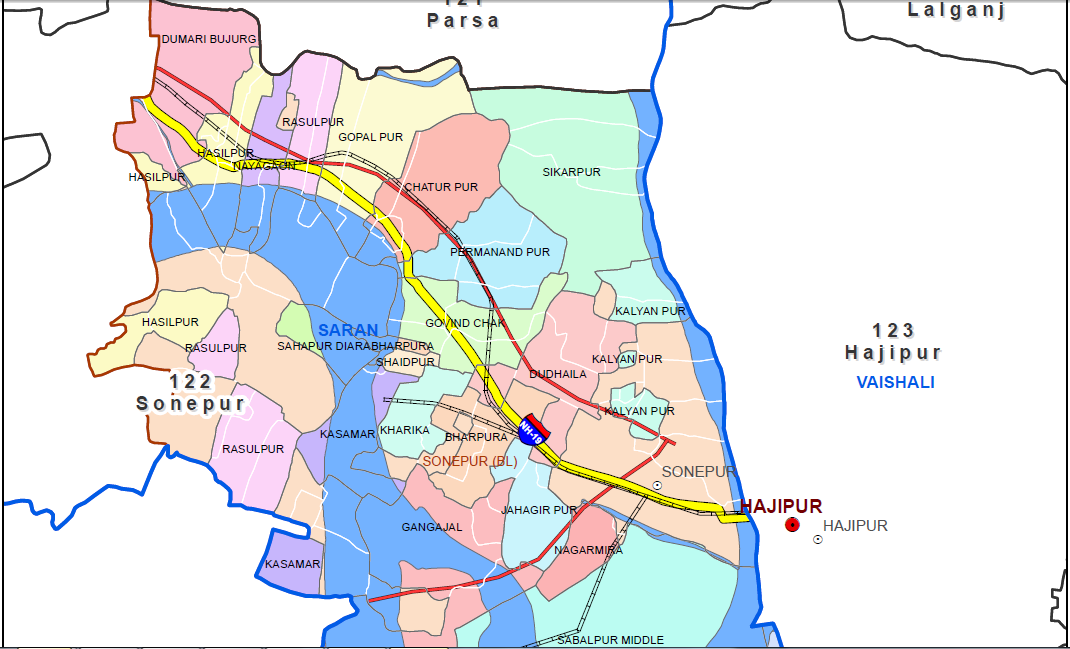
Nayagaon location in Sonpur block in Saran

Areas that come under the jurisdiction of Nayagaon P.S are:

1. Mohammadchak
2. Rasulpur
3. Kasturi Chak-Paswan tola
4. Chuturpur
5. Madrani Chak ghat
6. Nayagaon
7. Sitabganj
8. Dumri Buzurg
