= Ramanuj Prasad Yadav =

Indian politician

Member of Bihar Legislative Assembly
- In office 2015–2025
- Preceded by: Vinay Kumar Singh
- Succeeded by: Vinay Kumar Singh
- Constituency: Sonpur

Member of Bihar Legislative Assembly
- In office 2005–2010
- Preceded by: Vinay Kumar Singh
- Succeeded by: Vinay Kumar Singh
- Constituency: Sonpur

Personal details
- Born: Ramanuj Prasad Yadav; 12 November 1959 (age 66) Village-Najarmeera, Postoffice+thana-Sonepur, Dist-Saran district, Bihar
- Party: Rashtriya Janata Dal( 2000-till); Janata Dal (before-2000)
- Education: Master of Arts; LLB; PhD
- Profession: Politician, social worker, advocate, professor

Ramanuj Prasad Yadav is an Indian politician. He was elected to the Bihar Legislative Assembly from Sonpur as 2015 Member of Bihar Legislative Assembly as a member of the Rashtriya Janata Dal.
