= Sonpur Assembly constituency =

Assembly constituency in Bihar, India

Coordinates: 25°42′N 85°11′E

Sonpur
- Constituency No. 122 for the Bihar Legislative Assembly

Constituency details
- Country: India
- Region: East India
- State: Bihar
- District: Saran
- Established: 1951
- Total electors: 290,014

Member of Legislative Assembly
- 18th Bihar Legislative Assembly
- Incumbent Vinay Kumar Singh
- Party: BJP
- Alliance: NDA
- Elected year: 2025

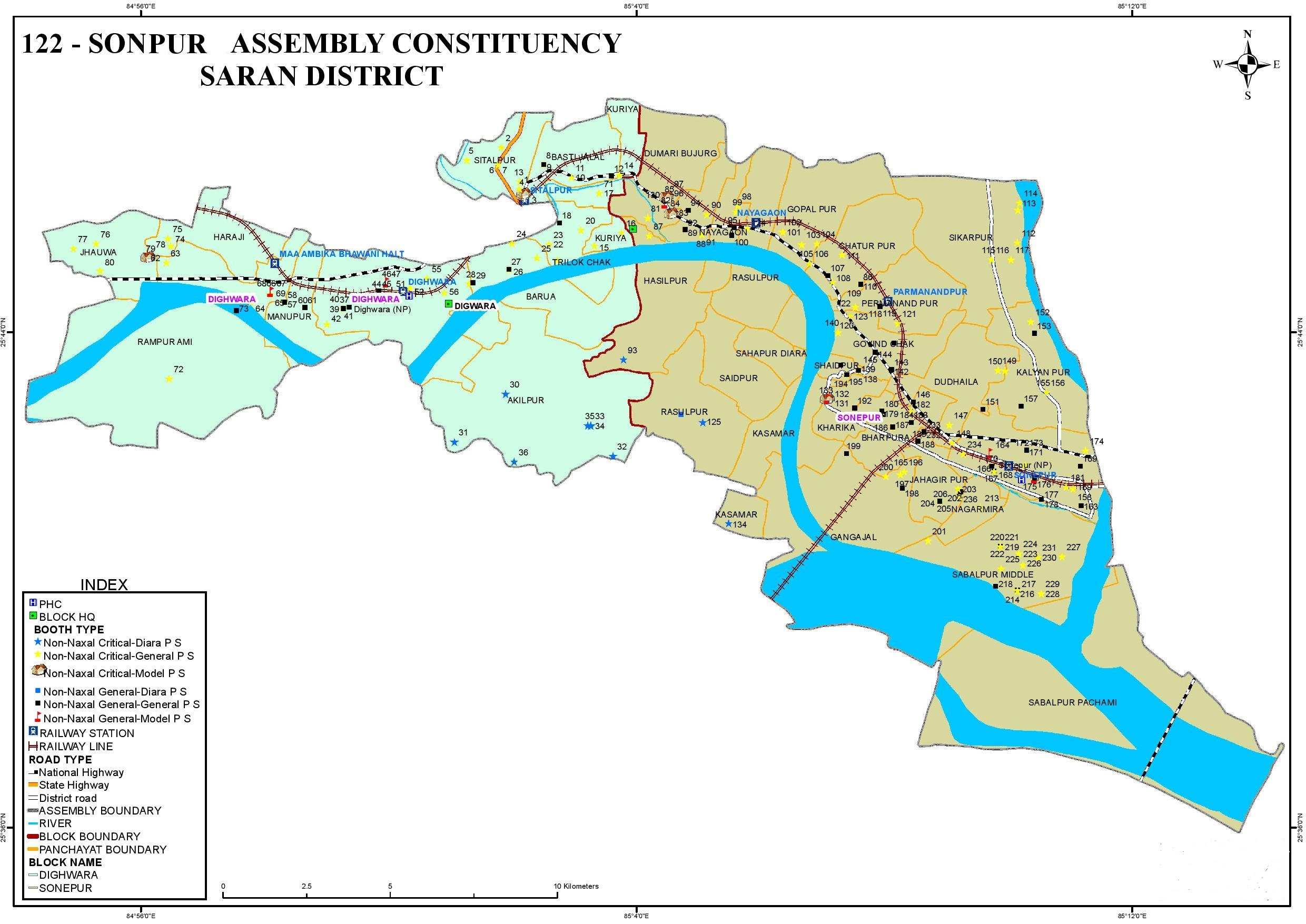
Sonpur Vidhan Sabha Saran Bihar

Sonpur Assembly constituency, often spelt Sonepur, is in Saran district in the Indian state of Bihar.

Ram Sundar Das, sitting MLA from Sonpur 1977–1980, served as Bihar's Chief Minister briefly in 1979.

== Overview ==
As per Delimitation of Parliamentary and Assembly constituencies Order, 2008, No. 122 Sonpur Assembly constituency is composed of the following: Sonpur and Dighwara C.D. blocks.

Sonpur Assembly constituency is part of No. 20 Saran (Lok Sabha constituency). It was earlier part of Chapra (Lok Sabha constituency).

== Members of Vidhan Sabha ==
Year	Member	Party
1952	Jagadish Sharma	Indian National Congress
1957	Ram Binod Singh	Independent
1962	Sheo Bachan Singh	Communist Party of India
1967	Ram Jaipal Singh Yadav	Indian National Congress
1969	Ram Jaipal Singh Yadav	Indian National Congress
1972	Ram Jaipal Singh Yadav	Indian National Congress
1977	Ram Sunder Das	Janata Party
1980	Lalu Prasad Yadav	Janata Party
1985	Lalu Prasad Yadav	Lok Dal
1990	Raj Kumar Roy	Janata Dal
1995	Raj Kumar Roy	Janata Dal
2000	Vinay Kumar Singh	Bharatiya Janata Party
2005	Ramanuj Prasad Yadav	Rashtriya Janata Dal
2005	Ramanuj Prasad Yadav	Rashtriya Janata Dal
2010	Vinay Kumar Singh	Bharatiya Janata Party
2015	Ramanuj Prasad Yadav	Rashtriya Janata Dal
2020	Ramanuj Prasad Yadav	Rashtriya Janata Dal
2025	Vinay Kumar Singh	Bharatiya Janata Party

== Election results ==
=== 2025 ===
Bihar Legislative Assembly Election, 2025: Sonepur
Party	Candidate	Votes	%	±%
BJP	Vinay Kumar Singh	90,842	45.59	+6.41
RJD	Ramanuj Prasad Yadav	86,075	43.2	+0.09
JSP	Chandan Lal Mehta	11,977	6.01	
Independent	Ramesh Kumar	3,156	1.58	−1.68
NOTA	None of the above	2,606	1.31	+0.4
Majority		4,767	2.39	−1.54
Turnout		199,240	68.7	+9.74
BJP gain from RJD		Swing		

=== 2020 ===
Bihar Assembly election, 2020: Sonpur
Party	Candidate	Votes	%	±%
RJD	Ramanuj Prasad Yadav	73,247	43.11	−11.76
BJP	Vinay Kumar Singh	66,561	39.18	+7.51
Independent	Chandan Lal	8,667	5.1	
Independent	Ramesh Kumar	5,541	3.26	
Independent	Suman Kumar	3,055	1.8	
Independent	Hem Narayan Singh	3,044	1.79	
Independent	Pinki Kumari Prasad	1,942	1.14	
NCP	Dharamveer Kumar	1,603	0.94	
NOTA	None of the above	1,546	0.91	−1.82
Majority		6,686	3.93	−19.27
Turnout		169,896	58.96	+0.4
RJD hold		Swing		

=== 2015 ===
- Ramanuj Prasad Yadav (RJD): 86,082 votes
- Vinay Kumar Singh (BJP): 49,686 votes

2015 Bihar Legislative Assembly election: Sonpur
Party	Candidate	Votes	%	±%
RJD	Dr. Ramanuj Prasad	86,082	54.87	
BJP	Vinay Kumar Singh	49,686	31.67	
Independent	Binod Kumar Singh	3,606	2.3	
Sarvajan Kalyan Loktantrik Party	Pradeep Kumar Sahni	3,265	2.08	
Independent	Sudhir Kumar Singh Alias Bhola Singh	2,312	1.47	
Independent	Ashok Singh	2,172	1.38	
NOTA	None of the above	4,290	2.73	
Majority		36,396	23.2	
Turnout		156,884	58.56	

=== 1980 ===
- Lalu Prasad Yadav (Janata-Secular): 45,041 votes
- Jawahar Prasad Singh (Indira Congress): 35,874 votes
- Ram Sunder Das (Janata Party): 10,396 votes

=== 1977 ===
- Ram Sunder Das (JNP): 40,747 votes
- Rameshwar Prasad Rai (IND): 15,411 votes
