= Ramsapur =

Village in Jaunpur, Uttar Pradesh, India

Ramsapur is a village in Jaunpur, Uttar Pradesh, India.
