= Shikarpur, Najafgarh =

Shikar Pur is a large village located in Najafgarh of South West Delhi district, Delhi with total 457 families residing. The village is located near Haryana-Border near Gurgaon. Gurgaon border is only 2 km from the village. Najafgarh Drain acts a border between the two states here. The village is very well developed having 100% permanent houses, RCC streets, street lights, Internet and telephone connectivity, a transport facility, Delhi Jal Board water supply, and all-round electricity. There is also plenty of greenery around the village. The Shikar Pur village has population of 2842 of which 1532 are males while 1310 are females as per Population Census 2011.

In ShikarPur village population of children with age 0-6 is 325 which makes up 11.44% of total population of village. Average Sex Ratio of Shikar Pur village is 855 which is lower than Delhi state average of 868. Child Sex Ratio for the Shikar Pur as per census is 729, lower than Delhi average of 871.

Shikar Pur village has a lower literacy rate compared to Delhi. In 2011, literacy rate of Shikar Pur village was 84.31% compared to 86.21% of Delhi. In Shikar Pur Male literacy stands at 93.08% while female literacy rate was 74.25%.

Shikar Pur village of southwest Delhi has substantial population of Schedule Caste. Schedule Caste constitutes 32.30% of total population in Shikar Pur village. The village Shikar Pur currently does not have any Schedule Tribe population. Most of the residents belongs to Tyagi Brahmin Caste, which is about 70% of total population. 7% Muslims are also living in the village .

Shikarpur is well connected to Najafgarh, its nearest town through DTC & Gramin Seva. DTC route number 829 Buses operate from the village to Najafgarh & up to Tilaknagar at regular intervals throughout the day. First bus from village to Najafgarh starts at 5 A.M and from Tilaknagar/Najafgarh to village at 6 A.M. Subsequently, first bus from village to Tilaknagar starts at 06:45 A.M from village. Gramin Seva operates from Chawla Stand to village at regular intervals on hourly basis.

Other means of coming to village are through Bus route no. 898 of Asalatpur Khawad which will take up to Khawad mode. Village is about 1.3 km from Mod which can be covered by Walking. Route no. 818 bus of Jhatikara village can also be taken which will terminate at Jhatikara village. Any one can go by Walking about 1.3 km from Jhatikara village to Shikarpur.

The Delhi government is considering declaring the Najafgarh jheel in southwest Delhi a notified wetland. Once the area is outlined and conservation plan approved, the lake is expected to cater to west Delhi's water requirements. Currently, the portion of the jheel in Delhi is privately owned across five villages, including Rawta, Ghumanhera, Jainpur, Shikarpur and Jhatikra. The Najafgarh jheel was part of Sahibi river, which flowed from Rajasthan. The 1883 Gazetteer of Delhi shows the spread of the lake as 220 square kilometres. The jheel used to dry out, as it was a seasonal water body and during the rabi season, farmers would sow on its bed. This is how private land holdings came into the picture.
