= Sahatwar =

- Town
- Location in Uttar Pradesh, India
- Coordinates: 25°50′N 84°18′E
- Country: India
- State: Uttar Pradesh
- District: Ballia
- Established: 1879
- Founder: Mahatpal

Population (2011)
  - Total: 20,615

Languages
  - Official: Hindi
  - Local: Bhojpuri
- Time zone: UTC+5:30 (IST)
- PIN: 277211
- Chairman = Sarita Singh

Sahatwar is a large town with the official status of nagar panchayat in Ballia district in the Indian state of Uttar Pradesh.

== Demographics ==
Sahatwar nagar panchayat has a population of 20,615 of which 10,731 are males while 9,884 are females as of the 2011 census, when there were 3148 children in the 0-6 age group, 15.27% of the total population. The female sex ratio is 921 against a state average of 912. Moreover, the child sex ratio in Sahatwar is around 970 compared to Uttar Pradesh's state average of 902. The literacy rate of Sahatwar is 67.30%, lower than the state average of 67.68%. In Sahatwar male literacy is around 75.93% while the female literacy rate is 57.85%.

== Temples and mosques ==
The Mahatpaleswar Nath temple (Old Shiva temple) is in the heart of the city. This city is also surrounded by a number of other temples, including Palat Baba to the east, Thakur Ji (Baulli) to the west, Sri Chainram Baba to the north, and Shri Ishwari Bhram Baba temple to the south. Apart from these some other old temples are there in Sahatwar as old Shankar Bhagwan Temple, Old Ram Janki Temple, Shajha Nand Braham Baba.

There are two mosques in the Sahatwar (Badi Masjid Near Police Chauki and Chhoti Masjid Near Purani Bazaar).

== Economy ==
Sahatwar is a trade center for around a hundred nearby small villages, including Dumariya, Khanpur, Haldi, Parsha, Harpur, Bani ke Bari (Purab Tola), Datuali, Baburani, Kopadhi and New Basti Chandpur (Singhi Mathiya), Bisauli and Husenabad (Husainabad). It is well linked to surrounding areas by both rail and roads.
