= Shikarpur, Jaunpur =

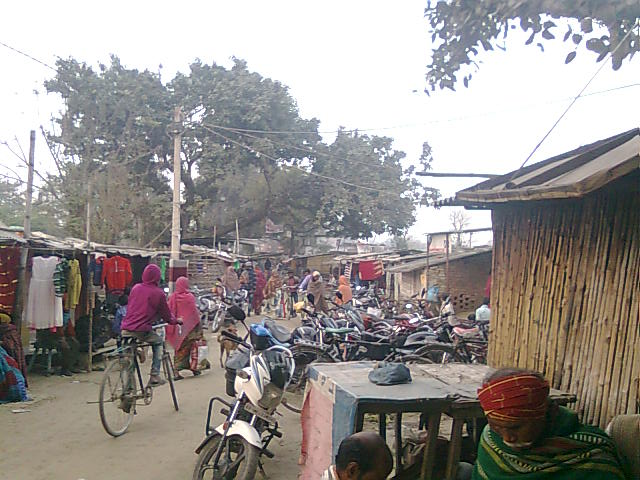
Shikarpur village main market.

Shikarpur is a village in Jaunpur tehsil of Jaunpur district, in the Varanasi division of the Indian state of Uttar Pradesh. According to the 2011 census, the population was 2,090.
