= Shikarpur, Sonepur =

Shikarpur
- Village
- Location in Bihar, India Shikarpur (India)
- Coordinates: 27.1082°N 84.4665°E
- Country: India
- State: Bihar
- District: Saran

Population (2001)
  - Total: 6,973

Languages
  - Official: Hindi
- Time zone: UTC+5:30 (IST)
- Vehicle registration: UP

Shikarpur is a village in Sonpur tehsil of Saran district in the Indian state of Bihar. Shikarpur's population is around 6973.
