= Sarvamangla =

Religion
- Affiliation: Hinduism
- District: Korba, Chhattisgarh
- Deity: Lord (Shiva)

Location
- Location: Korba, Chhattisgarh
- State: Chhattisgarh
- Country: India

Sarvamangla is a temple situated at Korba, Chhattisgarh in India.

Sarvamangala is one of the famous temple in Korba district. The Goddess of this temple is Durga. This temple was built by the ancestors of Rajeshwar Dayal one of the Zamindar in Korba. The temple is surrounded by Trilokinath Mandir, Kali Mandir and Jyoti Kalash Bhavan. There is also a cave, which goes under the river and comes out on the other side. Rani Dhanraj Kunwar Devi was used to this cave for her daily visit to the temple. It is beautifully painted Red which makes it even better.
