= Dighwara =

- Town
- Location in Bihar, India
- Coordinates: 25.73°N 85.0°E
- Country: India
- State: Bihar
- District: Saran
- Elevation: 43 m (141 ft)

Population (2011)
  - Total: 32,741

Languages
  - Official: Hindi
- Time zone: UTC+5:30 (IST)
- Lok Sabha constituency: Saran
- Vidhan Sabha constituency: Sonpur
- Website: http://dighwara.in/

Dighwara is a town and a Nagar Panchayat in the Saran district, state of Bihar, India. The name probably derives from 'Dirgh-dwar', literally "large gate", as Dighwara is claimed to be the entrance to the mythological city of king Daksha. During British Rule it was a Feudal Estate ruled by the Raghuvanshis.The town lies on the banks of Ganges River. A road bridge has been planned to be constructed over Ganges, between Dighwara and Danapur.

== History ==
The archaeological records suggests that Dighwara in Saran had supplied copper plate issued in the reign of king Mahendrapala in 898 A.D.

== Geography ==
Dighwara is located at 25.73°N 85.0°E. It has an average elevation of 43 metres (141 feet).

The State Government in collaboration with Power Grid Corporation of India founded the Sitalpur Power Grid in the year 2000 to provide electricity to the Rail Wheel Plant, Bela in Dariapur block and neighbouring villages in a radius of 25km.

== Demographics ==
As of the 2001 census of India, the Government of Bihar decided to develop Dighwara as a city of Patna Mahanagar.

Villages under the jurisdiction of Dighwara are:

- Aami
- Akilpur diyara
- Barbanna
- Basatpur
- Basti jalal
- Bodha Chapra
- Sitalpur
- Chaknoor
- Farhada
- Gorainpur
- Haraji
- Hematpur
- Kuraiya
- Laxmipur kakadhian
- Malkhachak
- Manupur
- Mirpur Bhual
- Pipra
- Raipatti
- Ramdaschak
- Rampur Pratappur
- Saidpur
- Trilokchak
- Bagheen

== Languages spoken in Dighwara ==
The major languages of the town are: Hindi, Bhojpuri and English. Although for cultural practices Sanskrit is used.

== Education ==
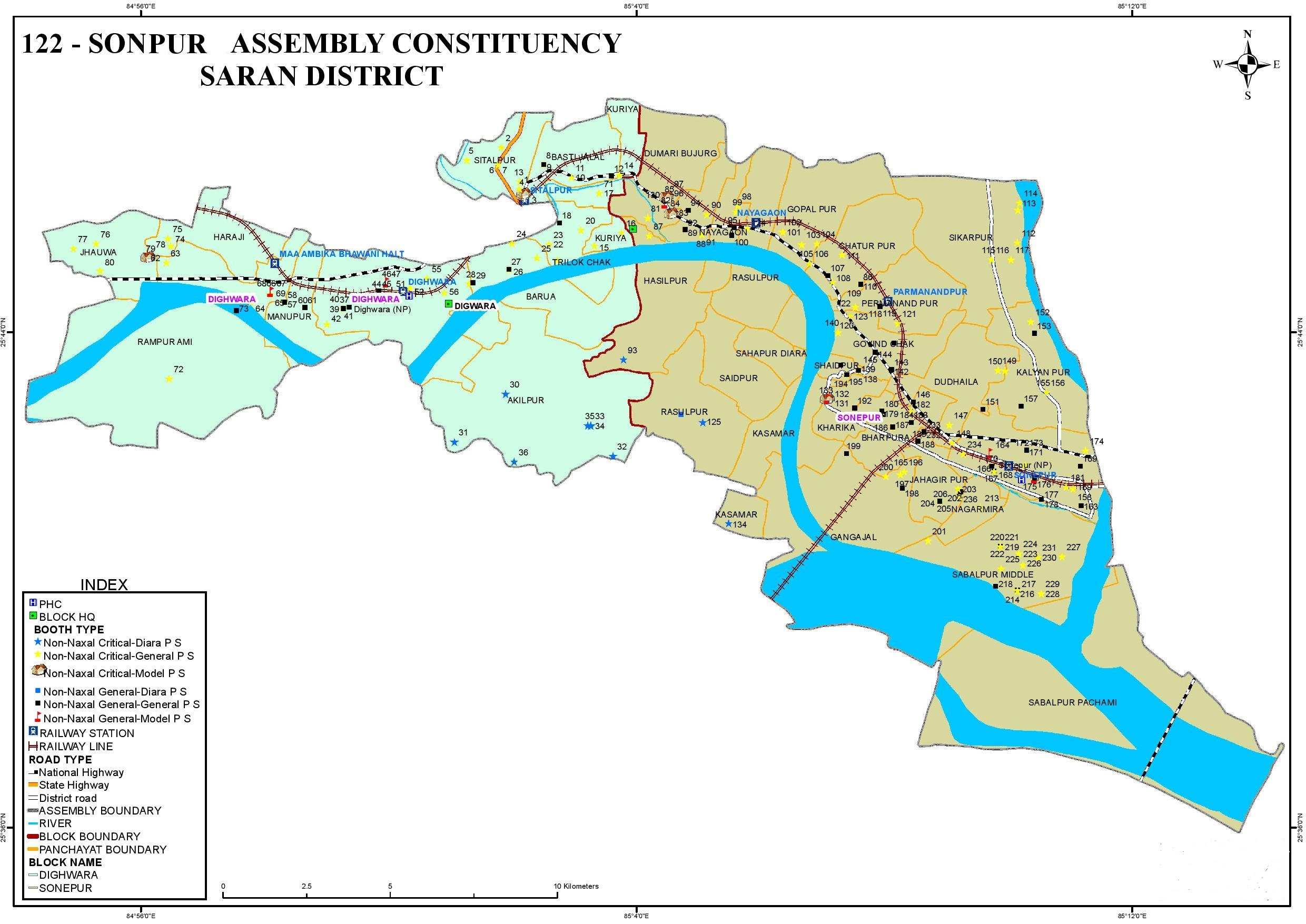
Dighwara block in Sonpur Vidhan Sabha

- Girls High School Shankarpur Road
- Jai Govind High School, Dighwara
- Middle School, Dighwara
- K N T College, Bhairopur
- Y N College, Dighwara
- Sri Baldev Vidyalaya, Trilokchak.
- Shyam Sundar Phula Devi Mahila college Dighwara
- Ram Jangal Singh College Dighwara
- S p Academy Dighwara
- Kendriya Vidyalaya -Dariyapur
- S.S.Academy - Ami.
- Central Public School Pukar Complex
- Holy Trinity Mission School, Bus Stand Dighwara
- S.C.I. Institute, Shankarpur Road, Dighwara
- Life Line Academy, Bus stand, Dighwara

== Hospitals of Dighwara ==
- Rajkiya Hospital, Dighwara

== Temples ==
=== Budhiya Mai Mandir or Temple of Budhiya Mai, Haraji ===
Budhiya Mai Mandir is one of the oldest temples in Dighwara block. It is situated at Haraji Bazaar. Its nearest railway station is Awatar Nagar Railway Station. It is located 100 meter away from NH 19, Haraji.

=== Thakur Jee Maharaj Temple or Thakurbadi, Haraji ===
Thakurbadi is the oldest temple in Panchayat Bhavan Road, Harajee. In this temple, there are many statues of the Hindu religion's Gods like Thakur Jee, Shiv Jee, and Ganesh Jee. It is situated in Panchayat Bhawan Road, Haraji.

=== Nakati Devi Mandir or Temple of Nakati Devi, Dighwara ===
This is actually the temple of Durga. A statue of Mahishasur mardini is installs in the temple. The statue is probably made of the historical Pall period.

=== Temple of Maa Ambika, (Aami) ===
Dedicated to the goddess Durga in her Ambika form, the temple lies roughly 2.5 kilometres (1.6 mi) west of Dighwara town. It is an old fort like building on the banks of the Ganges River. The temple is an example of standard north Indian temple architecture and has a central shrine or garvagriha housing the main idol of goddess Ambika. There is a yagya kunda where religious acts are carried out. A large idol of Shiva has been erected recently near the yagya kunda. Ambika Ashthan is mentioned in the ancient Hindu Markandeya Purana. The story of Maa Durga Sapt Sati supposedly took place in Aami, Dighwara. It is the place where Durga materialised to present gifts to Raja Surath. The claim is under investigation by many authors and experts in Indian archaeology.
