= Ladanpur =

Village in Jaunpur, Uttar Pradesh, India

Ladanpur is a village in Jaunpur, Uttar Pradesh, India. It is in the Bhiwani district. It is 216 meters above sea level.
