= Milki =

Milki, Jatt Muslims
Muslim Jats

Regions with significant populations
- India, Pakistan

Languages
- Urdu, Punjabi

Religion
- Islam

Milki also known as Jatt Muslims are community in India. The term milki originates from the word milk meaning revenue-free land grants. It refers to the collection of shaikh lineages in Awadh region. Milki shaikhs married other Milki families of Awadh in the past as they claim foreign descent but not this distinction doesn't exist
