= Rail Wheel Plant, Bela =

Railway wheels manufacturing unit in India

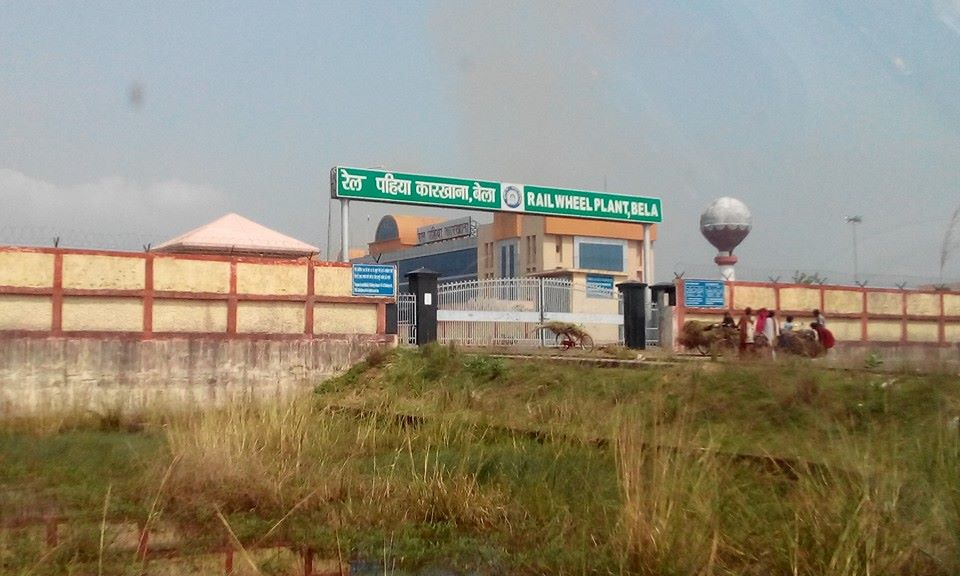
- Native name: रेल पहिया कारखाना, बेला
- Company type: Production unit
- Industry: Rail
- Founded: 2004
- Headquarters: Bela, Saran, Bihar
- Area served: India
- Key people: Ashwini Vaishnaw (Minister for Railways); Atulya Sinha (Chief Administrative Officer)
- Products: Wheels for Indian Railways
- Revenue: ₹15 billion (US$160 million) (2011–12)
- Owner: Indian Railways
- Website: rwp.indianrailways.gov.in

Indian Railways
Overview
- Headquarters: East Central Railway Zonal Headquarters, Hajipur
- Reporting mark: IR
- Locale: India
- Dates of operation: 2014–Present

Other
- Website: www.indianrailways.gov.in

Rail Wheel Plant, Bela (Hindi: रेल पहिया कारखाना, बेला) is an independent production unit of Indian Railways situated in the Bela gram panchayat of Dariapur Block, Parsa in Saran district of Bihar. It was inaugurated in 2008 by former Railway Minister Lalu Prasad Yadav, and was built at a cost of ₹1,450 crore (US$150 million). The station is spread over an area of 165 acres (0.67 km^{2}), and employs approximately 956 persons appointed by the Indian Railways, along with 300 contractual staff members.

== Construction ==
The Rail Wheel Plant's construction, which started in July 2008, was a step to revive industrialization in North Bihar. Indian Railways made history by awarding this project as an Engineering Procurement & Construction (EPC) contract to Larsen & Toubro Limited (L&T). It was the first time in the history of Indian Railways that a highly sophisticated factory was set up without any foreign collaboration. It was possible because of the in-house capability of railway engineers and expertise of L&T. The construction division of L&T (ECC) was involved in civil & electrical works, whereas the Railway Business Unit (an initiative of L&T in rolling stock projects) set up methods and procedures along with interfacing of equipment. Working in close coordination with contractors and sub-contractors, Indian Railways achieved completion of the project within the stipulated time-frame of 40 months (24 months of the original time schedule and additional extensions).

It was a challenge for Indian Railways to start civil works in a difficult site which is surrounded by rivers on all sides. To add to complications, the elevation of the plant was lower than the river bed. Because the soil was loose, stone columns were constructed to increase the load-bearing capacity of the soil. Additionally, Bihar is a remote area so L&T deployed 24-hour security because there was the constant fear of unlawful activities by locals and Maoist insurgents.

One siding Railway line from the plant site to Nayagaon railway station is under construction. The plant dispatched its first consignment of about 250 broad gauge passenger coach wheels in October 2016. Nearly 3000 workers were employed during peak construction period including 300 highly skilled engineers of various specialties.

== Safety ==
The Rail Wheel Plant project was completed with a safety record of 1 million safe man hours. This admirable safety record was achieved through a daily morning pep-talk and vigilant site supervision by trained and qualified safety stewards.

== Villages affected ==
The villages of Dariyapur Block specially Lalu Tola, Mushahari, Durbela, Babu Tola, and Kochwara were affected by the acquisition of land from farmers of these villages.

Indian Railways compensated farmers for the acquired lands and promised them jobs in the plant.

== Electricity ==
The State Government in collaboration with Power Grid Corporation of India founded the Sitalpur Power Grid in the year 2000 to provide electricity to the plant and neighboring villages in a radius of 25 km.

== Education ==
The Rail Wheel Plant founded some institutions for its employee and members of neighboring villages, especially Bela Gram Panchayat and Dariyapur:

- Kendriya Vidyalaya, Bela (affiliated from CBSE Delhi)
- Yamunachari High School, Dariyapur (State Government School affiliated from BSEB Patna)
- Government High School, Dariyapur (State Government School affiliated from BSEB Patna)

== See also ==
- Diesel Locomotive Factory, Marhowrah
- Electric Locomotive Factory, Madhepura
- Chittaranjan Locomotive Works, Asansol
- Banaras Locomotive Works, Varanasi
- Integral Coach Factory, Chennai
- Modern Coach Factory, Raebareli
- Rail Coach Factory, Kapurthala
- Rail Wheel Factory, Yelahanka
- Titagarh Wagons, Titagarh
- List of locomotive builders by countries
