= Sonpur, Bihar =

City in Bihar, India

Sonpur
- City
- Sonepur
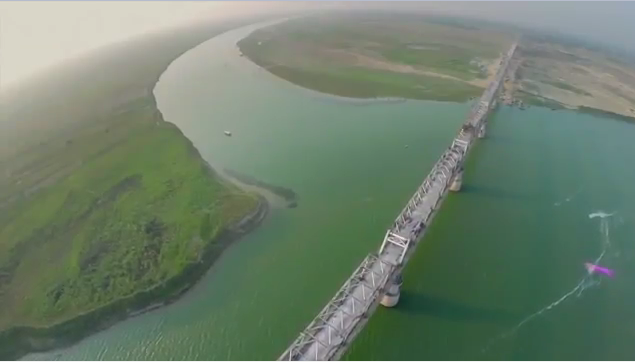
- Digha–Sonpur Bridge

- Location in Bihar, India
- Coordinates: 25.7°N 85.18°E
- Country: India
- State: Bihar
- District: Saran

Government
  - MLA: Vinay Singh ( B.J.P)
  - Member of Parliament: Rajiv Pratap Rudy

Area
  - Total: 8.27 km^{2} (3.19 sq mi)

Population (2021)
  - Total: 288,102
  - Density: 4,568/km^{2} (11,830/sq mi)

Languages
  - Official: Hindi

Regional Languages
  - Regional: Bhojpuri
- Time zone: UTC+5:30 (IST)
- PIN: 841101
- Telephone code: +91-6158
- ISO 3166 code: IN-BR
- Vehicle registration: BR-04
- Lok Sabha constituency: Saran
- Vidhan Sabha constituency: Sonepur
- Civic agency: Sonepur Nagar Panchayat

Sonpur, officially named Sonepur, is a city in the Indian state of Bihar, situated on the banks of the Gandaki River and Ganges River in the Saran District. Sonpur hosts Asia's largest cattle fair, which starts on Kartik Poornima.

== Geography ==
The town is located at 25.7°N 85.1832°E at an altitude of 42 metres (137 ft) above sea level.

The Gandaki River would have been the route of the movement of Buddha and his followers from the Nepalese Tarai to Magadh. This is why many stupas and similar structures, including Pillars of Ashoka, are found on the banks of the river. The location of Pathar Ki Mosque just opposite the confluence of the Gandaki and the Ganges shows the Muslim influence of trade and commerce in medieval times. The current township, Patna, is just the modern version of the makeshift headquarters of military establishments in the old Patna City which in turn was a later version of Pataliputra, the capital of the Maurya Empire.

== Transportation ==
Sonpur is in the Saran District of Bihar and is easily accessible via railways, roads, and waterways.

=== Roads ===
Sonepur Township Special Area including Core Area and Sonepur Greenfield International Airport

Sonpur is nearly 3 km from Hajipur, 25 km from Patna, 58 km from Muzaffarpur and 60 km from Chhapra, the headquarters of Saran District. Buses, taxis and rickshaws are easily available.

=== Railways ===
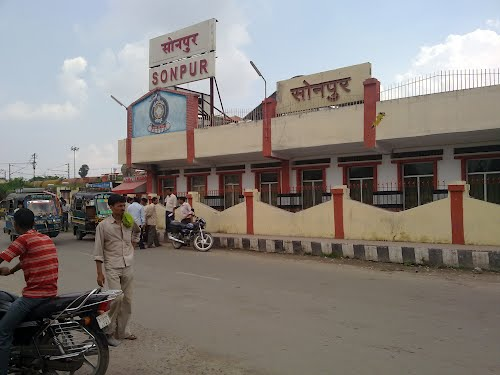
Sonpur station

The nearest railway station is Sonpur Junction railway station. It has trains connecting to almost every part of India. It is the divisional headquarters of the East Central Railway of the Indian Railways.

=== Waterways ===
The Bihar State Tourism Development Corporation (BSTDC) organizes ferries to Sonpur during the Sonepur Cattle Fair.

=== Airways ===
The nearest airport to Sonpur is the Jay Prakash Narayan Airport in Patna, around 25 km away.

=== Sonpur airport ===
The proposed Sonepur Greenfield International Airport is a major planned aviation project approved by the Bihar Cabinet in February 2026, targeting completion by 2030.The airport will be constructed in Hardiya Chanwar area, situated between Dariyapur in Chhapra and Sonepur in the Saran district, roughly 30–35 km from Patna City Centre. It will features a dual-runway layout with 4,200-meter runways designed to accommodate large wide-body aircraft, including the Airbus A380. Site clearance has been granted by the Ministry of Civil Aviation, and a Detailed Project Report (DPR) is currently being prepared by RITES Ltd. The main objective to build this greenfield airport is to serve as a major North Bihar aviation hub and a high-capacity alternative/gateway to the constrained Jay Prakash Narayan International Airport in Patna. Hardiya Chanwar is a vast, waterlogged agricultural tract. It spans four major blocks of Saran district: Parsa, Dariyapur, Dighwara, and Sonepur. Thousands of acres of land in this area remain submerged in water. While channels such as the Nehura Nala (which drains into the Gandak River) and the Mahdalichak Canal (which drains into the Ganges) exist for water discharge, waterlogging remains a major problem for the local farmers.

== Real estate boom ==
Real estate prices soared in Sonepur after the start of construction of Digha–Sonpur bridge in 2002. Real estate companies were reported to be acquiring large chunks of land and dividing them into small plots.

== Sonpur Satellite City ==
Sonpur Satellite City (Hariharnathpuram) is a planned greenfield mega township near Patna, Bihar, designed to reduce urban congestion across the capital. The Sonpur Township will be located approximately 6 kilometers from the station and approximately 1 kilometer from the proposed airport. Its core area is approximately 2,000 acres, and the special area is approximately 33,000 acres. The project includes 42 rural areas and 6 urban wards in Sonpur, 98 villages in Dariyapur, 2 in Parsa, and 4 in Dighwara. The state government has decided to develop it under the name "Hariharnathpuram," and its master plan will be ready by March 31, 2027.

== Cattle fair ==
Sonepur Cattle Fair is held annually in the city. The sight of numerous elephants, decorated for the purpose of sale, is an important visitor attraction.

The fair is held on Kartik Poornima in November. It is also known as Harihar Kshetra Mela and attracts visitors from all over Asia. To date, it is the largest cattle fair of India and stretches on from fifteen days to one month. It has its origins in ancient times: Chandragupta Maurya used to buy elephants and horses across the river Ganges. The Sonepur Cattle Fair once attracted traders from places as distant as Central Asia. In 2001, the number of elephants brought to Sonpur was 92, rising 354 elephants in 2004, while in 2016, 13 elephants made it to the fair, only for display, not for sale. In 2017, there were three tuskers at the fair. The fair continues to attract foreign tourists who come to see various elements of rural settlement. Apart from the photo opportunity, elephants continue to lure foreign tourists. Swiss cottages are set up by Bihar State Tourism Development Corporation (BSTDC) at the Sonpur fair, with facilities with Internet access, motor boat rides on the Gandaki River, food at the tourist village and pre-paid taxis from Patna Airport to the cattle fair. A Disneyland park is set up during the fair. A railgram stall is also set up by railways, with toy trains also being erected for children.

== Hariharnath Mandir ==
Hariharnath Mandir (Hindi: हरिहर नाथ मंदिर) in Sonpur is also known for being a famous temple and being the site of the Battle of Ghaghra. During Kartik Purnima a ceremonial bathing in the Ganges is held by Hindus. On the day of full moon, immense crowds assemble and bathe. The Shiva temple, Kali temple and other temples and historical religious monuments are situated here and social and economical activities are at their highest peak during the cattle fair period.

According to Uday Pratap Singh, author of the book Baba Hariharanath, before 1757, the Hariharanath Mandir was composed of artistic rock clusters of timber and black stones. These pictures and praises of Hari were engraved on them. Meanwhile, this temple was reconstructed by Ram Narayan Singh, the deputy sub-ruler of Mir Qasim. He was a resident of Nayagaon, Saran. After this, in 1860, the Empress of Tekai built a hospice in the temple premises. In 1871, the remaining three oases of the temple complex were constructed by Maharana Jangbahadur of Nepal. In the 1934 Nepal–Bihar earthquake, the temple complex, Osara and Pakora were damaged. After this the Birla family rebuilt it. The English writer Harry Abbott has highlighted the importance of this temple in his diary while visiting the Hariharnath Mandir. In 1871, English writer Minden Wilson described the Sonpur fair in his diary.

== See also ==
- List of villages in Sonpur tehsil
