= Dariapur community development block =

Dariapur dariyāpur sāmudāyik vikāś prakhanḍ
- Community Development Block
- Location in Bihar, India
- Coordinates: 25.73°N 85.0°E
- Country: India
- State: Bihar
- District: Saran

Government
  - Type: Community development block

Area
  - Total: 225.70 km^{2} (87.14 sq mi)
- Elevation: 43 m (141 ft)

Population (2011)
  - Total: 296,164
  - Density: 1,312/km^{2} (3,400/sq mi)

Languages
  - Official: Bhojpuri, Hindi
- Time zone: UTC+5:30 (IST)
- Postal code: 841221
- ISO 3166 code: IN-BR
- Lok Sabha constituency: Saran
- Vidhan Sabha constituency: Parsa (Vidhan Sabha constituency)
- Website: Dariyapur Block, Saran Website, under Integrated Block Information system

Dariapur community development block (Hindi: dariyāpur sāmudāyik vikāś prakhanḍ) is a rural area earmarked for administration and development in Saran district . The area is administered by a Block Development Officer. It is the largest Block of Saran District in terms of population. A community development block covers several gram panchayats, Panchayat Samiti (Block), Primary Agricultural Co-operative societies (PACS) and other local administrative unit at the village level. It is represented by Parsa Vidhan Sabha constituency in Bihar Legislative Assembly and Saran Lok Sabha constituency in Indian parliament. Currently, C.D.Blocks are administrative units of 3rd level in Bihar state of India (equal to Tehsil in other states). Rail Wheel Plant, Bela is located in Dariapur.

== Demographics ==
Dariapur Block of Saran district has highest population among all community development blocks of Saran district. Currently there are 20 community development blocks in the district. As of Ministry of Drinking Water and Sanitation 2009 report and 2011 Census, these were the findings.

Block Name	SC	ST	General and OBC	Total
Dariapur	33852	861	261451	296164

Major religion followed in this area is Hinduism. There is a small Muslim minority also present.

== Gram panchayats and Panchayat Samiti ==
Following are the twenty five Gram Panchayats and Panchayat samitis (Block Development councils) are present in Dariyapur block:

1. Driyapur
2. Bela
3. Pirari Dih
4. Hariharpur
5. Bishambharpur
6. Fatahpur Chain
7. Pratappur
8. Sajanpur Matihan
9. Akbarpur
10. Mujouna
11. Khanpur
12. Kakarhat
13. Sutihar
14. Jitwarpur
15. Pojhoi Khajouli
16. Natha Chapra
17. Mohmmadpur
18. Bajhiya
19. Harna
20. Bisahi
21. Saidpur
22. Barwe
23. Darihara
24. Manpura
25. Magarpal

=== Primary Agricultural Co-operative Systems ===
PACS is a Bihar Government scheme to improve Village economy and is administered by. There are 25 PACS in Dariyapur Block and these are as follows : Akbarpur, Bajahiya, Barwe, Bela, Bisahi, Bishambharpur, Darihara, Dariyapur, Fatahpur Chain, Hariharpur, Harna, Jitwarpur, Kakarahat, Khanpur, Magarpal, Manpura, Mohmmadpur, Mojouna, Natha Chapra, Pirari Dih , Pojhi Khajouli, Pratappur, Saidpur, Sajanpur Maithan, Sutihar
