= Pojhi Kapoor =

- Village
- Location in Bihar, India Pojhi Kapoor (India)
- Coordinates: 25.87°N 84.85°E
- Country: India
- State: Bihar
- District: Saran
- Elevation: 36 m (118 ft)

Population (2011)
  - Total: 4,254

Languages
  - Official: Hindi
- Time zone: UTC+5:30 (IST)
- Postal code: 841415
- ISO 3166 code: IN-BR

Pojhi Kapoor (also Pojhikpur, Pojhikapur) is a village and part of Bhualpur Panchayat of Saran district, Bihar, India.

== Geography ==
Pojhi Kapoor is located at 25.87°N 84.85°E. It has an average elevation of 36 metres.

== Location ==
Pojhi Kapoor (Postal Code 841415) is about 15 km from the district headquarters Chhapra. It falls under Bhualpur Panchayat of Marhaura Block of Saran district. Garkha is the nearest city. The village is well-connected by roads in all seasons. The nearest railway station is Chhapra (Station Code-CPR) and the nearest airport is Lok Nayak Jayaprakash Airport, Patna.

== Development Works ==
The village is equipped with pipelines for water supply. Public water taps has been also installed at a few places. Village has been water rich but due to the increasing population and lack of awareness for water conservation, the water level goes down, causing summers to become hard for people nowadays. Most hand pumps and wells dry during summer. However, a supply of water is available periodically morning to evening but it is also subject to the availability of electricity. One of the major issues faced by farmers in past years was irrigation of crops because most of the existing old pumps were not working at all due to low water level but this has been somewhat resolved by new submersible pumps installed in 2019 (private, with the help of government subsidies), which allow farmers to irrigate their crops at lower rates.

== Demographics ==
As of 2011 India census, Pojhi Kapoor had a population of 4,254. Males constitute 55% of the population and females 45%.

== Pojhi Kapoor and Pojhi Buzurg ==
This village has been historically divided in two parts. The western part of Pojhi is known as Pojhi Kapoor and the eastern part of the village is known as Pojhi Buzurg.

== Healthcare ==
- There is a Government Primary Health Care Center, which is situated at Pojhi Kapoor providing round-the-clock medical service to the local population.
- Electricity supply is available 24 hours a day.

== Schools ==
Pojhi Kapoor has three primary schools and one Higher Secondary School specifically for girls affiliated to Bihar School Examination Board.

- Sitaram Project Balika Uchhayatar(+2) Vidyalaya, Pojhi Kapoor
- Prathmik Vidyalya, Pojhi Kapoor
- Prathmik Kanya Vidyalya, Pojhi Buzurg
- Prathmik Vidyalya, Pojhi Buzurg

== Gallery ==
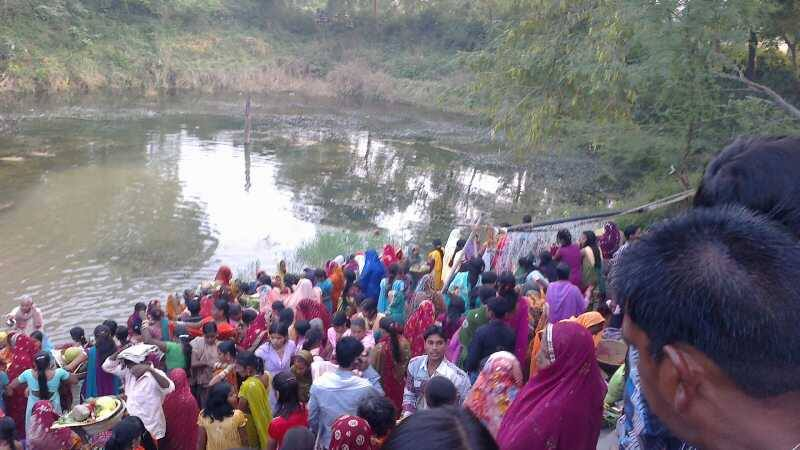
Chhath Ghat
- Lal Babu Rai, Ex-MLA Marhaura, Leader Janata Dal (United)
