= Marhaura subdivision =

Administrative subdivision in Saran district, Bihar, India

- Subdivision
- Location in Bihar, India Marhaura subdivision (India)
- Coordinates: 25.9601847°N 84.8468411°E
- Country: India
- State: Bihar
- District: Saran
- Headquarters: Marhaura

Area
  - Total: 709.1 km^{2} (273.8 sq mi)

Population (2011)
  - Total: 1,052,529
  - Density: 1,484/km^{2} (3,844/sq mi)

Languages
  - Official / Regional: Hindi, Bhojpuri
- Time zone: UTC+05:30 (IST)
- PIN: 841418
- Vehicle registration: BR-04

Marhaura subdivision is an administrative subdivision in the Saran district of Bihar, India. The subdivision headquarters is the town of Marhaura. It occupies the north-western part of the district and encompasses several community development blocks.

== Geography ==
Situated in the Gangetic plains of southern Bihar, Marhaura subdivision features predominantly alluvial terrain. The area consists of flat fertile plains interspersed with seasonal streams and low-lying riverine tracts. Some parts of the subdivision are prone to monsoon flooding during periods of heavy rainfall or high river discharge, while other upland areas are comparatively less vulnerable.

== Administration ==
Marhaura is one of three subdivisions in Saran district, alongside Chhapra/Sadar and Sonepur. According to the district administration, it comprises the following Community Development (CD) Blocks:

- Amnour (Amnaur / Amnour)
- Isuapur
- Marhaura
- Mashrak
- Panapur
- Taraiya

The official block mapping is available on the Saran Division portal.

== Demographics ==
As per the 2011 Census of India, Marhaura subdivision had a combined population of 1,052,529 across its six CD Blocks, covering an area of 709.1 km².

2011 Census — selected figures by CD Block
Block	Population (2011)	Area (km²)
Amnour	200,395	127.1
Isuapur	146,822	102.0
Marhaura	265,123	150.0
Mashrak	188,899	123.0
Panapur	121,738	108.0
Taraiya	129,552	99.0
Total	1,052,529	709.1

Detailed literacy rates, sex-ratio, and SC/ST population for each block are recorded in the District Census Handbook and accompanying census tables.

== Economy ==
The subdivision’s economy is largely agrarian. Agriculture and allied activities provide the primary source of livelihood, with crop patterns, irrigation, and small-scale industries documented in the District Census Handbook and District Industrial Potential Survey reports.

== Transport ==
Road and rail are the main transport modes. The subdivision is connected via major roads to its block headquarters and neighboring towns, and railway stations in Marhaura and nearby towns serve passenger and freight transport.

== Education and public services ==
Educational and health facilities are distributed across the blocks, including primary, upper primary, and secondary schools, primary health centres, and sub-centres. Village Directory data in the District Census Handbook provides comprehensive lists of such amenities.

== See also ==
- Bihar
- Saran district
- Marhaura
- Amnour
- Mashrak
- Panapur
