= Saran Lok Sabha constituency =

Constituency of the Indian parliament in Bihar

Coordinates: 25.9°N 84.8°E

Saran
- Lok Sabha constituency

Constituency details
- Country: India
- Region: East India
- State: Bihar
- Established: 2009
- Reservation: None

Member of Parliament
- 18th Lok Sabha
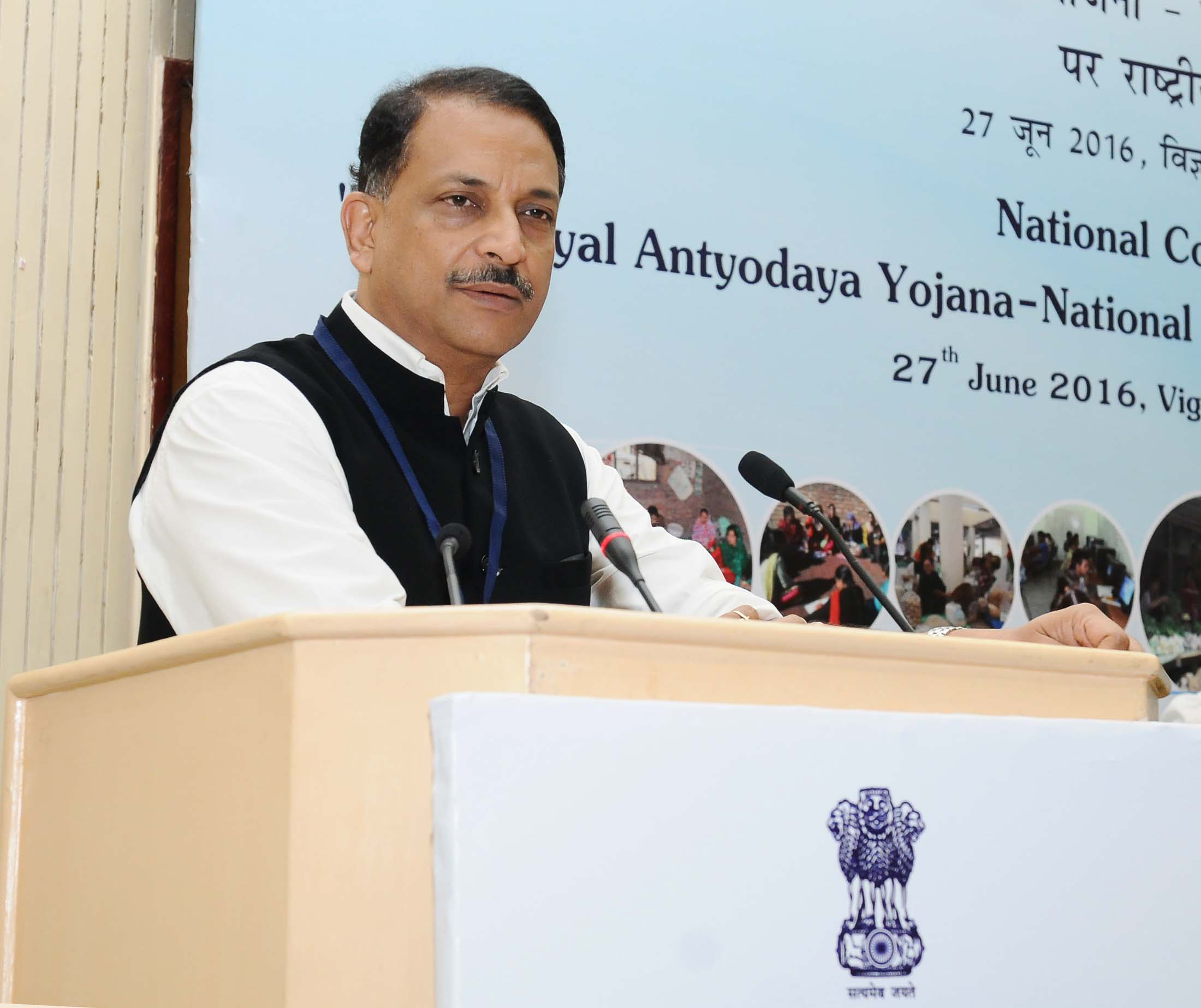
- Incumbent Rajiv Pratap Rudy
- Party: BJP
- Alliance: NDA
- Elected year: 2024
- Preceded by: Lalu Prasad Yadav, RJD

Saran is one of the 40 Lok Sabha (parliamentary) constituencies in Bihar state in eastern India. This constituency came into existence in 2008 as a part of the implementation of delimitation of parliamentary constituencies based on the recommendations of the Delimitation Commission of India constituted in 2002. Before delimitation, it was Chapra (Lok Sabha constituency).

Most successful parties from Saran Lok Sabha
1. BJP (3 times) (75.0%)
2. RJD (1 time) (25.0%)

== Vidhan Sabha segments ==
Presently, Saran Lok Sabha constituency comprises the following six Vidhan Sabha (legislative assembly) segments:

#	Name	District	Member	Party	2024 lead
117	Marhaura	Saran	Jitendra Rai	RJD	BJP
118	Chapra	Saran	Chhoti Kumari	BJP	BJP
119	Garkha (SC)	Saran	Surendra Ram	RJD	RJD
120	Amnour	Saran	Krishna Kumar Mantoo	BJP	BJP
121	Parsa	Saran	Karishma Rai	RJD	RJD
122	Sonpur	Saran	Vinay Kumar Singh	BJP	RJD

== Members of Lok Sabha ==
Year	Name	Party
Until 2008 : See Chapra
2009	Lalu Prasad Yadav	Rashtriya Janata Dal
2014	Rajiv Pratap Rudy	Bharatiya Janata Party
2019	Rajiv Pratap Rudy	Bharatiya Janata Party
2024	Rajiv Pratap Rudy	Bharatiya Janata Party

== Election results ==
=== General elections 2009 ===
2009 Indian general elections: Saran
Party	Candidate	Votes	%	±%
RJD	Lalu Prasad Yadav	274,209	47.21	
BJP	Rajiv Pratap Rudy	2,22,394	38.29	
BSP	Salim Parwez	45,027	7.75	
Independent	Sheo Das Singh	9,798	1.69	
Majority		51,815	8.92	
Turnout		5,80,829	48.77	
RJD win (new seat)				

=== General Elections 2014 ===
2014 Indian general elections: Saran
Party	Candidate	Votes	%	±%
BJP	Rajiv Pratap Rudy	355,120	41.12	+2.83
RJD	Rabri Devi	3,14,172	36.38	−10.38
JD(U)	Saleem Perwez	1,07,008	12.39	N/A
BSP	Bal Mukund Chauhan	15,500	1.79	−5.96
NOTA	None of the Above	19,163	2.22	N/A
Majority		40,948	4.74	−4.18
Turnout		8,63,254	56.10	+7.33
BJP gain from RJD		Swing		

=== 2019 ===
2019 Indian general elections: Saran
Party	Candidate	Votes	%	±%
BJP	Rajiv Pratap Rudy	499,342	51.29	+10.17
RJD	Chandrika Roy	3,60,913	38.28	+1.9
NOTA	None of the Above	28,267	3.00	+0.78
Majority		1,38,429	14.70	
Turnout		9,43,615	56.60	
BJP hold		Swing		

=== 2024 ===
2024 Indian general election: Saran
Party	Candidate	Votes	%	±%
BJP	Rajiv Pratap Rudy	471,752	46.18	▼5.11
RJD	Rohini Acharya	4,58,091	44.84	▲6.56
NOTA	None of the above	11,417	1.11	▼1.89
Majority		13,661	1.34	
Turnout		10,22,613	56.79	
BJP hold		Swing		

== See also ==
- Saran district
- List of constituencies of the Lok Sabha
- Pataliputra (Lok Sabha constituency)
