= Revelganj =

- Town
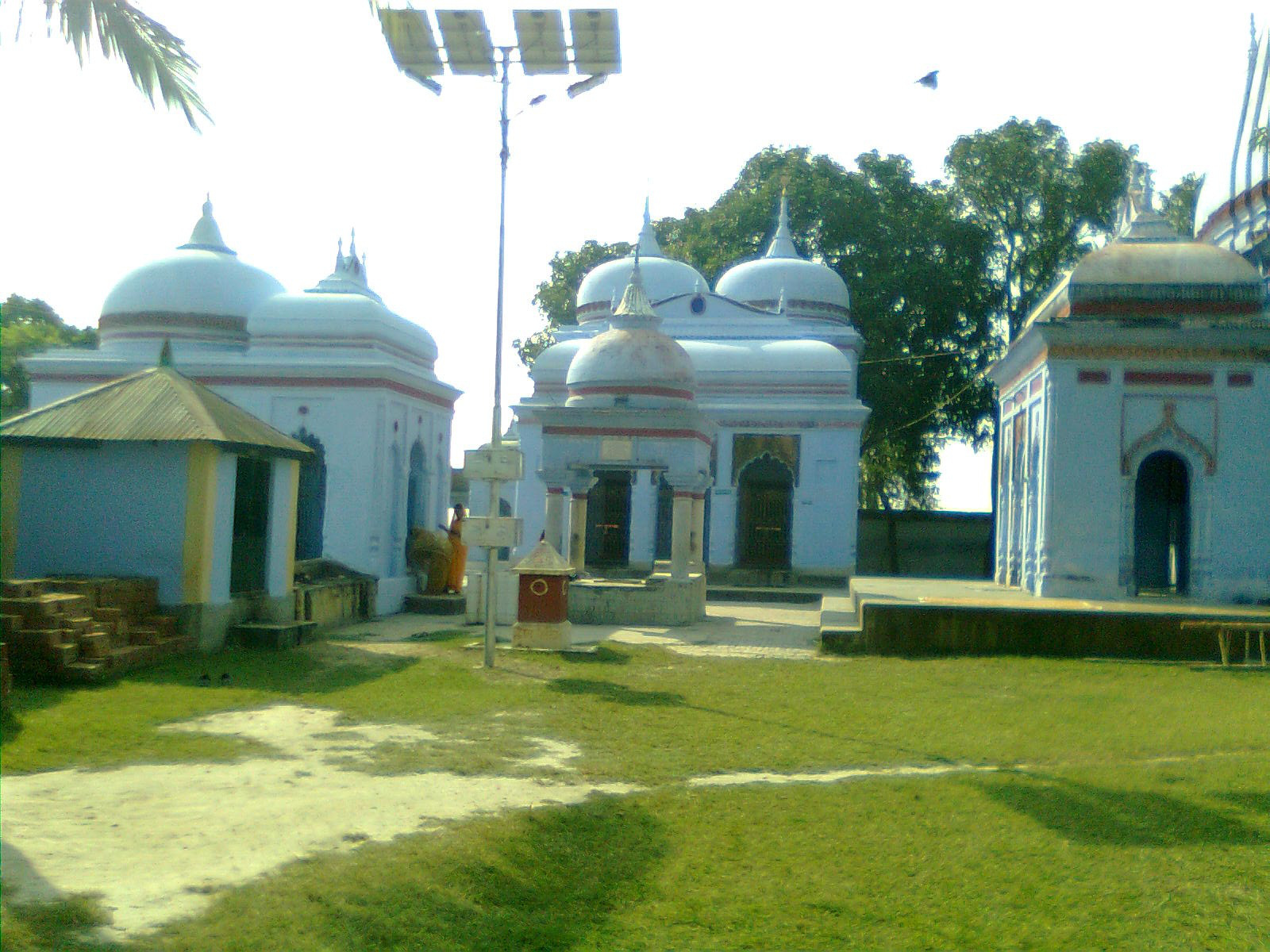
- Goutam Asthan

- Location in Bihar, India
- Coordinates: 25.78°N 84.67°E
- Country: India
- State: Bihar
- District: Saran district
- Elevation: 52 m (171 ft)

Population (2011)
  - Total: 39,039
- Time zone: UTC+5:30 (IST)
- Postal code: 841315
- Lok Sabha constituency: Saran
- Vidhan Sabha constituency: Chapra

Revelganj is a town and one of the oldest nagar panchayat in Saran district in the Indian state of Bihar.

== Nagar Panchayat ==
The Nagar Panchayat of Rivilganj is considered as one of the oldest Nagar Panchayat of Bihar.

== History ==
Rivilganj was the birthplace of Mata Anjana, the mother of Hanuman, the bhakt (devotee) of Rama. This place is also known for Ahilya Uddhar (absolution). A temple devoted to Maharishi Gautam, also known as Gautam Sthan, is located at Godna locality. A temple devoted to Kali Mata, also known as Kaliasthan, is located at Baiju Tolla locality. There is also an ashram of Shringi Rishi in the municipality.

== Geography ==
Rivilganj is located at 25.78°N 84.67°E. It has an average elevation of 52 metres (170 feet). It is located at the confluence of the Ganges and Ghaghara (Sarayu) rivers.

== Demographics ==
As of 2001 India census, Rivilganj had a population of 34,044. Males constitute 52% of the population and females 48%.
