= Yaduvanshi Rai =

Indian politician

MLA, Bihar Legislative Assembly
- In office 1995–2005
- Preceded by: Surendra Sharma
- Succeeded by: Lal Babu Rai
- Constituency: Marhaura

Personal details
- Born: Saran district, Bihar
- Died: 13 September 2016 Gurugram, Haryana
- Party: Rashtriya Janata Dal; Janata Dal
- Children: Jitendra Kumar Rai
- Occupation: Politician

Yaduvanshi Rai was an Indian politician. He was elected as a member of Bihar Legislative Assembly from Marhaura constituency in Saran district, Bihar.

== Death ==
Rai died on 13 September 2016 in Medanta, Gurugram, Haryana

== See also ==
- Marhaura Assembly constituency

== Legacy ==
- His son (Jitendra Kumar Rai) active in politics and currently MLA from Marhaura constituency in Bihar Legislative Assembly.
