= Gandar =

Coordinates: 31°53′N 76°33′E

Gandar is a village situated in Chapra district of Bihar, India. It has a total population of around 3,000. This village is situated 15 km from Marhaura. It is 7 km east from Mashrak railway station on State Highway 73. Dr. Birendra Ray Institute of Medical Sciences (Brims Hospitals) is a multi-speciality hospital near this village. It was established on 10 August, 2018 with the aim of providing medical services in rural areas.
