= Patrahi Khurd =

Village in Saran, Bihar, India

- Village
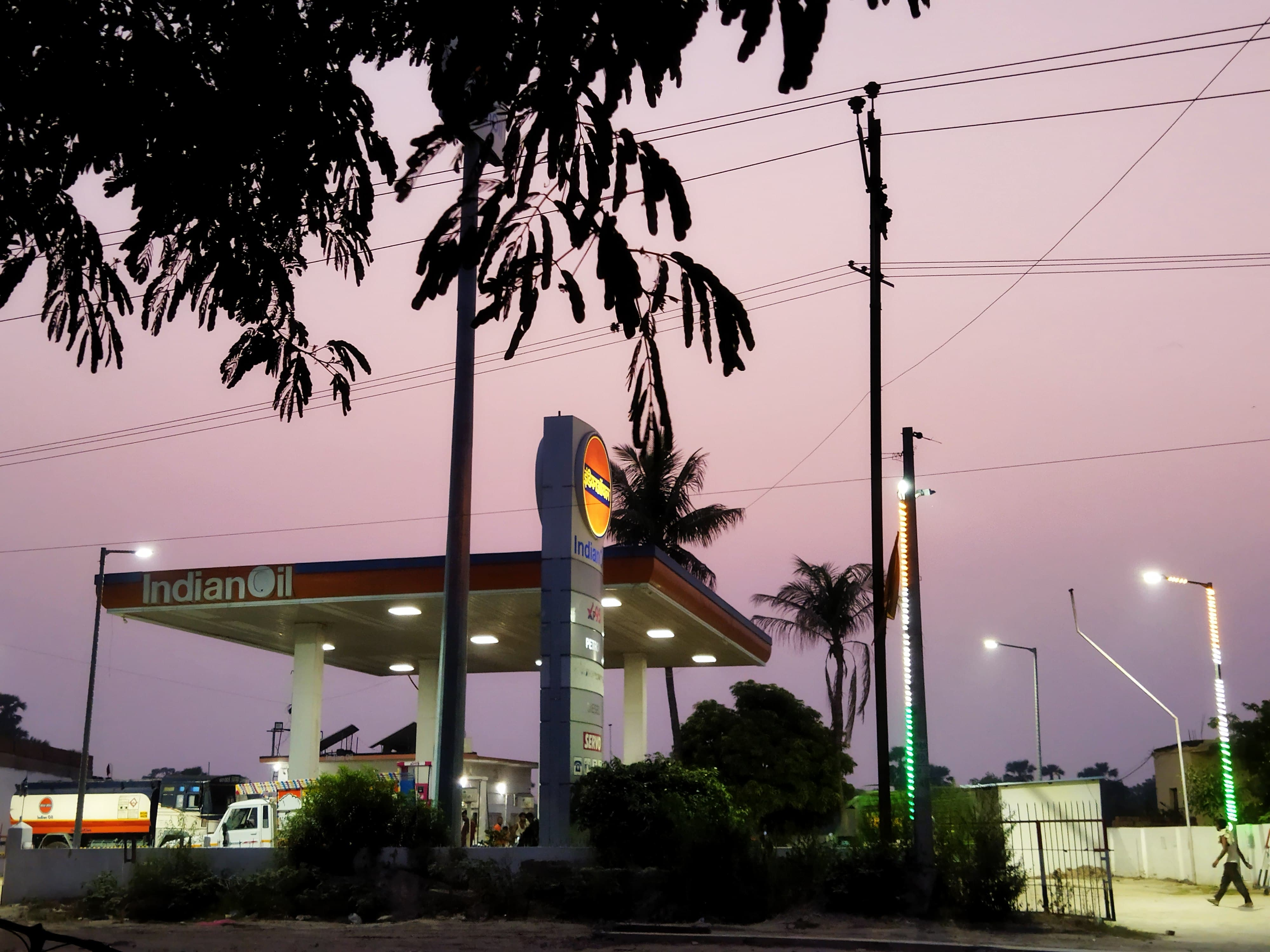
- Patrahi Khurd Indian Oil petrol pump

- Location in Bihar, India Patrahi Khurd (India)
- Coordinates: 25.9049998°N 84.9416555°E
- Country: India
- State: Bihar
- District: Saran
- Block/Tehsil: Amnour

Government
  - Type: Panchayati Raj
  - Body: Gram Panchayat

Area
  - Total: 52 ha (130 acres)

Population (2011)
  - Total: 1,226
  - Density: 2,400/km^{2} (6,100/sq mi)

Languages
  - Official: Hindi, Bhojpuri
- Time zone: UTC+5:30 (IST)
- PIN: 841402
- Vehicle registration: BR-04

Patrahi Khurd is a village in the Amnour community development block of Saran district, Bihar, India. It comes under the jurisdiction of the Paiga Mitrasen Gram Panchayat and is part of the Saran division.

== Geography ==
Patrahi Khurd lies in the north-central part of Bihar within Amnour block of Saran district. It is located about 9 km from the block headquarters at Amnour and about 29 km from the district headquarters at Chhapra. The village is situated on the Gangetic plain, with flat alluvial terrain used mainly for agriculture. Its exact coordinates are 25.9049998°N 84.9416555°E, according to mapping databases.

== Administration ==
Patrahi Khurd is administered under the Panchayati Raj system of local self-government. The governing body is the Gram Panchayat, and the village comes under the jurisdiction of Paiga Mitrasen Gram Panchayat. It falls under Amnour block in Saran district and is part of the Saran division. The village is recorded in the Census with code 233973.

== Demographics ==
As per the 2011 Census of India:

- Total households: 205
- Total population: 1,226 (Males: 594; Females: 632)
- Children (0–6 years): 206 (16.80%)
- Overall sex ratio: 1064 females per 1000 males (higher than Bihar average of 918)
- Child sex ratio (0–6): 1060
- Literacy rate: 64.31% (Male: 76.32%; Female: 53.04%)
- Scheduled Castes: 134 (10.93% of population); Scheduled Tribes: 0

=== Work profile ===
Out of 262 total workers:

- 184 were main workers (employed for more than 6 months)
- 78 were marginal workers
- Among main workers: 51 cultivators, 27 agricultural labourers

=== Demographics Table (2011) ===
Indicator	Value
Population	1,226
Male	594
Female	632
Households	205
Children (0–6 yrs)	206
Literacy rate	64.31% (M: 76.32%, F: 53.04%)
Sex ratio	1064 ♀/1000 ♂
Child sex ratio (0–6)	1060 ♀/1000 ♂
Scheduled Castes	134
Scheduled Tribes	0

== Economy ==
The economy of Patrahi Khurd is predominantly agrarian. Most villagers are engaged in cultivation and agricultural labour. A notable proportion of workers are marginal or seasonal workers, reflecting the cyclical nature of agricultural employment.

== Infrastructure ==
- Area: Approximately 52 hectares (per Census village records).
- Education: The village has an upper primary school (UMS Patrahi Khurd), providing education up to class 8.
- Postal: The area is served under the postal PIN code 841402 (Amnour/Chapra region).
- Transport: The village is connected to Amnour and other nearby settlements via rural roads. The nearest railway facilities are at Chhapra and other small local stations in Saran district.

== Culture ==
Residents celebrate common Bihari festivals such as Chhath, Diwali, and Holi. Folk traditions and agrarian cultural practices are also significant. Temples and shrines are present within or near the settlement, in line with regional religious practices.

== See also ==
- Amnour
- Saran district
