= Ekma =

- town
- Location in Bihar, India
- Coordinates: 25°57′0″N 84°32′0″E
- Country: India
- State: Bihar
- District: Saran

Languages
  - Official: Hindi, Bhojpuri
- Time zone: UTC+5:30 (IST)
- PIN: 841208
- Telephone code: 06155

Ekma is a Tehsil town and Taluka of Banwari Amnour in Saran district of Bihar state, India.

== See also ==
- Eksar
