= Chhote Lal Ray =

Indian politician

Member of the Bihar Legislative Assembly
- In office 2020–2025
- Preceded by: Chandrika Rai
- Succeeded by: Karishma Rai
- Constituency: Parsa
- In office 2005–2010
- Preceded by: Chandrika Rai
- Succeeded by: Chandrika Rai
- Constituency: Parsa

Personal details
- Party: Rashtriya Janata Dal
- Education: 10th Pass
- Occupation: Politician, social worker

Chhote Lal Ray is an Indian politician and a member of Bihar Legislative Assembly, representing the Parsa Assembly constituency in the Saran district in the state of Bihar. He is a member of the Rashtriya Janata Dal party.
