= Parsa Assembly constituency =

Coordinates: 25°53′01″N 85°01′28″E

Parsa
- Constituency No. 121 for the Bihar Legislative Assembly

Constituency details
- Country: India
- Region: East India
- State: Bihar
- District: Saran
- Lok Sabha constituency: 20. Saran
- Established: 1951
- Total electors: 270,589

Member of Legislative Assembly
- 18th Bihar Legislative Assembly
- Incumbent Karishma Rai
- Party: RJD
- Alliance: MGB
- Elected year: 2025

Parsa Assembly constituency is an assembly constituency in Saran district in the Indian state of Bihar.

== Overview ==
As per Delimitation of Parliamentary and Assembly constituencies Order, 2008, No. 121 Parsa Assembly constituency is composed of the following: Dariapur community development block; Shankardih, Anjani, Banouta, Anyay, Baligaw, Marar, Bahar Marar and Parsouna gram panchayats of Parsa CD Block.

Parsa Assembly constituency is part of No. 20 Saran (Lok Sabha constituency). It was earlier part of Chapra (Lok Sabha constituency).

== Members of the Legislative Assembly ==
Year	Name	Party
1952	Daroga Prasad Rai	Indian National Congress
1957	Daroga Prasad Rai	Indian National Congress
1962	Daroga Prasad Rai	Indian National Congress
1967	Daroga Prasad Rai	Indian National Congress
1969	Daroga Prasad Rai	Indian National Congress
1972	Daroga Prasad Rai	Indian National Congress
1977	Ramanand Prasad Rai	Janata Party
1980	Daroga Prasad Rai	Indian National Congress
1981^	Parvati Rai	Indian National Congress
1985	Chandrika Rai	Indian National Congress
1990	Chandrika Rai	Independent politician
1995	Chandrika Rai	Janata Dal
2000	Chandrika Rai	Rashtriya Janata Dal
2005	Chandrika Rai	Rashtriya Janata Dal
2005	Chhote Lal Rai	Janata Dal (United)
2010	Chhote Lal Rai	Janata Dal (United)
2015	Chandrika Rai	Rashtriya Janata Dal
2020	Chhote Lal Rai	Rashtriya Janata Dal
2025	Karishma Rai	Rashtriya Janata Dal

^by-election

== Election results ==
=== 2025 ===
Bihar Legislative Assembly Election, 2025: Parsa
Party	Candidate	Votes	%	±%
RJD	Karishma Rai	89,093	49.16	+4.8
JD(U)	Chhote Lal Ray	63,321	34.94	+1.81
JSP	Mosaheb Mahto	10,126	5.59	
Independent	Shriniwas Sah	3,211	1.77	
BSP	Md Samim Ansari	2,540	1.4	
AAP	Pawan Tiwari	1,977	1.09	
NOTA	None of the above	4,677	2.58	−0.78
Majority		25,772	14.22	+2.99
Turnout		181,235	66.98	+9.24
RJD hold		Swing		

=== 2020 ===
2020 Bihar Legislative Assembly election: Parsa
Party	Candidate	Votes	%	±%
RJD	Chhote Lal Ray	68,316	44.36	−11.55
JD(U)	Chandrika Rai	51,023	33.13	
LJP	Rakesh Kumar Singh	12,186	7.91	−17.35
Independent	Manager Singh	4,558	2.96	
Independent	Mahesh Ray	4,119	2.67	
Independent	Swami Jeetendra	2,550	1.66	
JAP(L)	Shailendra Kumar	2,363	1.53	+1.2
Independent	Sandhya Ray	2,038	1.32	−1.96
NOTA	None of the above	5,179	3.36	−1.01
Majority		17,293	11.23	−19.42
Turnout		153,994	57.74	+2.47
RJD hold		Swing		

=== 2015 ===
2015 Bihar Legislative Assembly election: Parsa
Party	Candidate	Votes	%	±%
RJD	Chandrika Rai	77,211	55.91	
LJP	Chhote Lal Ray	34,876	25.26	
Independent	Ritesh Kumar Roushan	5,907	4.28	
Independent	Sandhya Ray	4,533	3.28	
BSP	Shiv Kumar Prasad Rai	2,371	1.72	
NOTA	None of the above	6,030	4.37	
Majority		42,335	30.65	
Turnout		138,093	55.27	
