= Narayanpur (234060) =

Narayanpur is a village in Parsa block, Saran district of Bihar, India. As of the 2011 Census of India, it had a population of 2,000 across 268 households.
