= Inai =

Inai Indrapuri
- village
- Interactive map of Inai
- Country: India
- State: Bihar
- District: Saran

Government
  - Body: Gram panchayat

Population (2011)
  - Total: 8,000 approx.

Bhojpuri Languages Bhojpuri
  - Official: Maithili, Hindi
- Time zone: UTC+5:30 (IST)
- PIN: 841314
- Telephone code: 06152
- ISO 3166 code: IN-BR
- Vehicle registration: BR-04
- Coastline: 0 kilometres (0 mi)
- Patna: Chhapra
- Sex ratio: 975 approx ♂/♀
- Literacy: 60%%
- Lok Sabha constituency: Chhapra
- Civic agency: Gram panchayat

Inai is a village in Saran district of Bihar state, India. As of the 2011 Census of India, it had a population of 4,944 across 782 households.
