= Chapra Assembly constituency =

Chapra Assembly constituency may refer to

- Chapra, Bihar Assembly constituency
- Chapra, West Bengal Assembly constituency
