= Bhishma Prasad Yadav =

Indian politician

MLA, Bihar Legislative Assembly
- In office 1969–1977
- Preceded by: Devi Laljee
- Succeeded by: Surya Singh
- Constituency: Marhaura
- In office 1980–1990
- Preceded by: Surya Singh
- Succeeded by: Surendra Sharma
- Constituency: Marhaura

Personal details
- Born: Saran district, Bihar
- Party: Indian National Congress
- Occupation: Politician

Bhishma Prasad Yadav was an Indian politician. He was elected as a member of Bihar Legislative Assembly from Marhaura constituency in Saran district, Bihar.

== Political life ==
Yadav was elected fourth time from Marhaura constituency as a member of Indian National Congress

== See also ==
- Marhaura Assembly constituency
