= Udit Rai =

Indian politician

Health ministers of Bihar Government of Bihar
- In office 9 March 1999 – 2 March 2000
- Chief Minister: Rabri Devi
- Preceded by: Mahaveer Prasad
- Succeeded by: Shakeel Ahmad
- Constituency: Chapra

Member of Bihar Legislative Assembly
- In office 1990–2005
- Preceded by: Janak Yadav
- Succeeded by: Ram Parvash Rai

Personal details
- Party: Rashtriya Janata Dal
- Parent: Gorakh Rai (father)
- Occupation: Politician

Udit Rai is an Indian politician and a member of the Bihar Legislative Assembly from Chapra constituency.

== Political career ==
Rai served as a health ministers of Bihar from 9 March 1999 to 2 March 2000, for the Rashtriya Janata Dal government in Bihar led by Rabri Devi.
