= Jalalpur, Bihar Assembly constituency =

Constituency of the Bihar legislative assembly in India

Coordinates: 25°54′08″N 84°41′30″E

Jalalpur
- Former constituency for the Bihar Legislative Assembly

Constituency details
- Country: India
- Region: East India
- State: Bihar
- District: Saran
- Established: 1967
- Abolished: 2008

Jalalpur Assembly constituency was an assembly constituency in Saran district in the Indian state of Bihar.

== Overview ==
As a consequence of the orders of the Delimitation Commission of India, Jalalpur Assembly constituency ceased to exist in 2010.

== Members of Vidhan Sabha ==
Year	Member	Party
1967	Kamakhya Narain Singh	Jan Kranti Dal
1969	Kumar Kalika Singh	Indian National Congress
1972	Kumar Kalika Singh	Indian National Congress
1977	Kameshwar Singh	Janata Party
1980	Kumar Kalika Singh	Indian National Congress (I)
1982^	Sudhir Kumar Singh	Indian National Congress
1985	Sudhir Kumar Singh	Indian National Congress
1990	Nirmala Singh	Indian National Congress
1995	Abhay Raj Kishore	Communist Party of India
2000	Janardan Singh Sigriwal	Independent
2005	Janardan Singh Sigriwal	Bharatiya Janata Party
2005	Janardan Singh Sigriwal	Bharatiya Janata Party
2010 onwards: Constituency does not exist
