= Eksar =

Coordinates: 26°01′37″N 84°32′20″E

- village
- Interactive map of Eksar
- Country: India
- State: Bihar
- Established: 1000ed

Population
  - Total: 2,000

Languages
  - Official: Bhojpuri, Hindi
- Time zone: UTC+5:30 (IST)
- Postal code: 841204
- ISO 3166 code: IN-BR

Eksar is a small village in the Saran district of Bihar state in India. The village is inhabited by 500 families and around 2,000 people. It is 40 km from Chhapra city.

The basic source of livelihood for people is farming and it is well known for rice, wheat and mango orchards. The landmarks in the village include several temples. All the temples are placed at different-different location such as Badham Baba, Hanuman Temple is situated in the south of the village, Kali Temple situated in the middle of the village, and a Shiva temple in the middle of the village. This village is famous for many types of old story.
