= Acharya Sarangdhar =

'Acharya' Sarangdhar
- आचार्य सारंगधर
- Born: Pirari village, Saran district, Bihar, India
- Occupations: Teacher, writer, poet, story writer
- Writing career
- Notable works: Shabd Vigyan (शब्द विज्ञान), Shabd Sampada (शब्द संपदा)
- Notable awards: 2015: President Award (National Award for Teachers) 2018: Bharat Gaurav 2011: Vidyasagar Award

'Acharya' Sarangdhar is a teacher, Hindi writer, poet, essayist, story writer and scholar. He has penned books on Hindi 'vyakaran', essays, poems and is a columnist in various Hindi and Bhojpuri magazines published from India and abroad.

He has been conferred with President Award (National Award for Teachers) 2015, Bharat Gaurav Award 2014 and Vidyasagar Award in 2011 for his contribution to Hindi literature.

== Career ==
On 18 May 1988 he began his career as a Teacher in education department of Bihar Government. Apart from teaching he is a member of various Hindi, Sanskrit and Bhojpuri committees.

== Awards and recognitions ==
- President Award (National Award for Teachers) for his contribution in education.
- Bharat Gaurav award by Vikramshila University for contribution in the field of Hindi and Bhojpuri literature.
- D. Litt ( Vidyasagar Award) – Vikramshila Hindi Vidyapeeth Gandhinagar, Gujarat awarded him with D. Litt degree for his extra ordinary contributions in the field of Hindi Literature.
- Kameshwar Singh Darbhanga University Darbhanga, Bihar awarded him with PhD degree for his research work on comparative study of Sanskrit and Bhojpuri Vyakaran.
- He was awarded with the 'Samman Patra (सम्मान पत्र)' from commissioner of Saran, S.P Saran and Buddhijeevi Vichar Mantra Chhapra for his book 'Shabd Vigyan'.

== Works ==
Acharya Sarangdhar's contributions to Hindi Vyakaran writings include:

He has written the following books on Hindi Vyakaran:

- Shabd Vigyan (शब्द विज्ञान)
- Shabd Sampada (शब्द संपदा)

India in Hindi and Sanskrit:

- Mahavaiyakaran Hanuman (महावैयाकरण हनूमान)
- Bhasha Ka Mahatva (भाषा का महत्व)
- Hindi Ka Saralya (हिंदी का सरल्य)
- Patro Me Sambodhan (पत्रों में संबोधन)
- Vividh Proyog (विविध प्रोयोग)
- Sanskrit me Dwivachan ki Aniwaryata (संस्कृत में द्विवचन की अनिवार्यता)
- Sanskrit Ki Saralta (संस्कृत की सरलता)
- Hindi me Ling Vidhan (हिंदी में लिंग विधान)
- Annadbhawantibhootani (अन्नादभवान्तिभूतानी)
- Vyakaran Bina bhasha adhuri (व्याकरण बिना भाषा अधूरी)

His works in field of poetry are:

- Hey bharat ma mujhe bata de! (हे भारत मा मुझे बता दे!)
- Namamiram Raghvagham (नममिराम राघवम)
- Vividha me ekta (विविधा में एकता)
- O veer! vijay lekar aana (वो वीर! विजय लेकर आना)

Some of his works in Bhojpuri includes:

- Ekre naam pratibha ha (एकरे नाम प्रतिभा हा)
- Bhikhari Thakur ke natakan me muhavara-mimanta (भिकारी ठाकुर के नाटकन में मुहवारामिमांता)
