= C. N. Gupta =

Indian politician

Chaturbhuj Nath Gupta

Member of Bihar Legislative Assembly
- In office 2015–2025
- Preceded by: Randhir Kumar Singh
- Succeeded by: Chhoti Kumari
- Constituency: Chapra

Personal details
- Born: 3 April 1947 (age 79) Motipur, Muzaffarpur
- Party: Bharatiya Janata Party
- Spouse: Gayatri Aryani (m. 1971)
- Children: 3
- Occupation: Politician

C. N. Gupta (3 April 1947) is an Indian politician from Bihar and a Member of the Bihar Legislative Assembly.

== Early life and education ==
C.N. Gupta completed his intermediate school education from Shri Radha Krishna Goenka College, Sitamarhi in 1965. He then completed his MBBS education from Darbhanga Medical College and Hospital in 1970.

== Political career ==
Gupta is a RSS sanghchalak of Saran division including Chhapra, Siwan and Gopalganj. C.N. Gupta is a well known face in Chhapra and adjoining areas as a doctor (pathologist) and social worker. He joined RSS in 1967. He fought the Chhapra assembly by-election as an independent candidate in 2014 and came second in the by-election ahead of BJP candidate Kanhaiya Singh.

Gupta won the Chapra Assembly constituency on the BJP ticket in the 2015 Bihar Legislative Assembly election and 2020 Bihar Legislative Assembly election. BJP denied him ticket in 2025 Bihar Legislative Assembly election.

== Personal life ==
Gupta is married to Gayatri Aryani. She was district chairman of Inner Wheel Club of Chhapra (Inner Wheel District 325) from 2018 to 2019.

Gupta belongs to Vaishya community (Teli). Gupta served as president of Bihar Tailik Sahu Samaj till 2013.. Gupta retired as civil surgeon of Siwan in 2007 and runs a pathological laboratory in Chhapra.
