= Daroga Prasad Rai =

Former Chief Minister of Bihar

10th Chief Minister of Bihar
- In office 16 February 1970 – 22 December 1970
- Preceded by: President's rule
- Succeeded by: Karpoori Thakur
- Constituency: Parsa, Saran District, Sub Division- Sonepur

Personal details
- Born: 2 September 1922 Bajahiya, Saran district, Bihar and Orissa Province, British India,
- Died: 15 April 1981 (age 58) Patna, Bihar, India
- Party: Indian National Congress
- Spouse: Parvati Devi (Died.2005)
- Children: Chandrika Ray (Ex. Minister Bihar), Bidhan Ray (Business man), Anil Ray (Retd. Colonel), Ashok Ray (Retd. Chief engineer, TISCO), Sunil Ray (Supreme Court advocate)
- As of February 9, 2008

Daroga Prasad Rai (2 September 1922 – 15 April 1981) was an Indian politician from the state of Bihar. He was the Chief Minister of Bihar in 1970 for ten months, but Congress was reduced to a minority in December 1970 and Karpoori Thakur became the first socialist Chief Minister for a few months, with Jana Sangh support. From 2 July 1973 to 11 April 1975, he was the Deputy Chief Minister and in charge of finance in Abdul Gafoor's ministry. In the 1990s, when the Janata Dal family began to be dominant in politics, his son, Chandrika Roy, also accompanied Lalu Prasad Yadav. Chandrika Roy is the second of the five sons of Daroga Rai. Daroga Prasad Rai's grand daughter, Aishwarya Rai, married Tej Pratap Yadav, the eldest son of Lalu Prasad Yadav, on 12 May 2018.

== Early and Personal Life ==
Daroga Prasad Rai was born in an Yadava Ahir family in the Saran district of Bihar.

Daroga Prasad Rai was married to Parvati Devi. The couple has five sons: Vidhanchandra Rai, Dr. Chandrika Rai, Ashok Rai, Anil Rai, and Sunil Rai.

== In Bihar Legislative assembly ==
In First General Elections held in 1951-52 he contested from Parsa constituency of Bihar Vidhan Sabha and won.

== In memory ==
- Daroga Prasad Rai College, Siwan, Bihar.

== See also ==
- Daroga Prasad Rai Path
