= Janardan Singh Sigriwal =

Indian politician

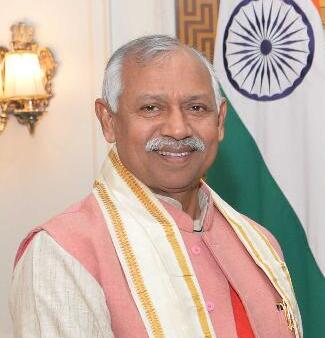
- Sigriwal in 2020

Member of Parliament, Lok Sabha
- Incumbent
- Assumed office 2014
- Preceded by: Prabhunath Singh
- Constituency: Maharajganj

Minister of Labour Resources Government of Bihar
- In office 26 November 2010 – 16 June 2013
- Chief Minister: Nitish Kumar
- Preceded by: Awadhesh Narain Singh

Minister of Art, Culture & Youth Affairs Government of Bihar
- In office 24 November 2005 – 13 April 2008
- Chief Minister: Nitish Kumar
- Succeeded by: Renu Devi

Member of Bihar Legislative Assembly
- In office 2010–2014
- Preceded by: Ram Pravesh Rai
- Succeeded by: Randhir Kumar Singh
- Constituency: Chapra
- In office 2000–2010
- Preceded by: Abhay Raj Kishore
- Succeeded by: constituency defunct
- Constituency: Jalalpur

Personal details
- Born: 2 January 1959 (age 67) Saran
- Party: Bharatiya Janata Party
- Spouse: Shiv Kumari Devi
- Children: 5
- Profession: Politician
- As of 15 December, 2019

Janardhan Singh Sigriwal is an Indian politician of Bharatiya Janata Party. He is a member of the 17th Lok Sabha (the lower house of the Parliament of India) representing Maharajganj (Bihar Lok Sabha constituency). Earlier he won Bihar assembly elections in 2000, Feb-2005, October 2005 from Jalalpur. He represented Chapra seat since 2010 in Bihar assembly. He was also Minister of Labour Resources. He was a sports and youth minister in Nitish Kumar cabinet.

== Background family and education ==
He was born in Saran district in Bihar. He studied in local schools and graduated from Rajendra College, Chapra. At present his residence is in Jalalpur (Block) in Saran district in Bihar.

== Political career ==
He was first elected MLA from Jalalpur seat. After that he shifted to Chapra seat and won that seat. He remained MLA of Chapra till he won the 2014 Lok Sabha elections from Maharajganj . He was among the ministers who were removed when JDU broke the alliance unilaterally.

Fame India Best Twenty Five MP Award for 2020 for most Responsible MP went to Janardhan Singh Sigriwal. In 2023, Sigriwal participated in protest against Bihar government led by Nitish Kumar and Tejaswi Yadav. Bhartiya Janata Party organised this protest to support the cause of Bihar teacher's exam aspirants, who were against the domicile policy of Government of Bihar in recruitment as teacher in state's government educational institutions. Sigriwal was part of this protest, in response to which, the Nitish Kumar led government ordered lathi charge to break the protest. As per media reports, despite having Y category security, Sigriwal was beaten by Bihar police. He got serious injuries and was admitted in hospital. As per reports, when he was beaten by police, he tried to explain them that he is a Member of Parliament, yet the Bihar Police thrashed him; other BJP political activists were also chased and beaten severely.

Singh has been a victim of public rage for several times. In 2020, he went to a flood affected area in Siwan, falling under his constituency to meet the flood victims. Here, a dispute occurred between local Mukhiya and flood victims with his supporters. As a result of which, Sigriwal and his supporters were thrashed. As per media reports, chairs were also used by flood victims in attack upon him.

== Parliamentary works ==
On 12/07/2019 Janardan Singh Sigriwal, Member of Parliament of Bharatiya Janata Party and representing Maharajganj Parliamentary constituency has moved private member bill, Compulsory Voting Bill 2019 for making voting Compulsory all eligible voters in Lok Sabha.
