= Chandrika Roy =

Indian politician

Chandrika Rai

Cabinet Minister Government of Bihar
- In office 20 November 2015 – 26 July 2017
- Governor: Ram Nath Kovind
- Chief Minister: Nitish Kumar
- Ministry & Departments: Transport
- Preceded by: Brishin Patel
- Succeeded by: Santosh Kumar Nirala

Member of Bihar Legislative Assembly
- In office 20 November 2015 – 14 November 2020
- Constituency: Parsa
- Preceded by: Chhote Lal Ray
- Succeeded by: Chhote Lal Ray
- In office 12 March 1985 – 24 November 2005
- Preceded by: Chhote Lal Ray
- Succeeded by: Chhote Lal Ray

Personal details
- Born: 31 December 1957 (age 68) Bajahiya, Saran district, Bihar
- Party: Rashtriya Janata Dal (Till 2015); Janata Dal (United) (2015 - Present)
- Spouse: Purnima Roy
- Children: Aishwarya Roy Apurva Roy Aayushi Roy
- Education: Patna university (BA, MA)
- Occupation: Politician

Chandrika Rai is an Indian politician from Saran district of Bihar, India. He was a Member of Bihar Legislative Assembly (2015-2020) representing Parsa (Vidhan Sabha constituency) from RJD Party. Now he is in the Janata Dal (United) Party.

== Political career ==
Roy made entry into politics in 1985 as member of Bihar Legislative Assembly from Parsa (Vidhan Sabha constituency). Again in 1990, 1995 and 2000, he won from the same constituency. In October 2005 and 2010 Bihar Legislative Assembly elections, he lost to Chhotelal Rai. He also held the position as Minister of Transport Department of Government of Bihar from 2015 to 2017. Currently, he is serving as Member of Bihar Legislative Assembly from Parsa (Vidhan Sabha constituency) since 2015.

He quit the Rashtriya Janata Dal due to the marital dispute between his daughter and RJD president Lalu Prasad Yadav's son Tej Pratap Yadav.

== Personal life ==
Chandrika Roy is the second son of the five sons of Daroga Prasad Rai. He is married to Purnima Priyadarshini and has 3 children, namely Apurva Roy, Aishwarya Roy and Aayushi Roy. Chandrika Rai's daughter Aishwarya Roy married Tej Pratap Yadav, the eldest son of Lalu Prasad Yadav on 12 May 2018.

== See also ==
- Bihar Legislative Assembly
- Politics of India
- Tej Pratap Yadav
- Lalu Prasad Yadav
