= Surendra Ram =

Indian politician

Surendra Ram is an Indian politician. He is a member of Rashtriya Janata Dal and a member of the Bihar Legislative Assembly from Garkha Assembly constituency
