= Marhaura Assembly constituency =

Coordinates: 25°58′22″N 84°51′39″E

Marhaura
- Constituency No. - for the Bihar Legislative Assembly

Constituency details
- Country: India
- Region: East India
- State: Bihar
- District: Saran
- Established: 1951
- Total electors: 271,541

Member of Legislative Assembly
- 18th Bihar Legislative Assembly
- Incumbent Jitendra Kumar Rai
- Party: RJD
- Alliance: MGB
- Elected year: 2025

Marhaura is an assembly constituency in Saran district in the Indian state of Bihar.

== Overview ==
As per Delimitation of Parliamentary and Assembly constituencies Order, 2008, No. 117 Marhaura Assembly constituency is composed of the following: Marhaura and Nagra community development blocks.

Marhaura Assembly constituency is part of No. 20 Saran (Lok Sabha constituency). It was earlier part of Chapra (Lok Sabha constituency).

== Members of the Legislative Assembly ==
Year	Name	Party
1952	Ram Swarup Devi	Indian National Congress
1952^	Janardan Prasad Singh	Praja Socialist Party
1957	Devi Laljee	Praja Socialist Party
1962	Suraj Singh	Indian National Congress
1967	Devi Laljee	Samyukta Socialist Party
1969	Bhishma Prasad Yadav	Indian National Congress
1972	Bhishma Prasad Yadav	Indian National Congress
1977	Surya Singh	Janata Party
1980	Bhishma Prasad Yadav	Indian National Congress
1985	Bhishma Prasad Yadav	Indian National Congress
1990	Surendra Sharma	Independent politician
1995	Yaduvanshi Rai	Janata Dal
2000	Yaduvanshi Rai	Rashtriya Janata Dal
2005	Lal Babu Rai	Independent politician
2005	Lal Babu Rai	Independent politician
2010	Jitendra Kumar Ray	Rashtriya Janata Dal
2015	Jitendra Kumar Ray	Rashtriya Janata Dal
2020	Jitendra Kumar Ray	Rashtriya Janata Dal
2025	Jitendra Kumar Ray	Rashtriya Janata Dal

== Election results ==
=== 2025 ===
2025 Bihar Legislative Assembly election: Marhaura
Party	Candidate	Votes	%	±%
RJD	Jitendra Kumar Ray	86,118	47.97	+8.53
JSP	Naveen Kumar Singh	58,190	32.42	
Independent	Ankit Kumar	17,310	9.64	
Independent	Sandev Kumar Ray	3,483	1.94	
Rashtriya Jansambhavna Party	Lalu Prasad Yadav	2,820	1.57	
Rashtriya Sab Janshakti Party	Purushottam Kumar	2,338	1.3	
NOTA	None of the above	4,809	2.68	+1.67
Majority		27,928	15.55	+8.04
Turnout		179,508	66.11	+9.5
RJD hold		Swing		

=== 2020 ===
2020 Bihar Legislative Assembly election: Marhaura
Party	Candidate	Votes	%	±%
RJD	Jitendra Kumar Ray	59,812	39.44	−8.17
JD(U)	Altaf Alam	48,427	31.93	
LJP	Vinay Kumar	6,550	4.32	
Independent	Lal Babu Ray	6,323	4.17	
Independent	Nagendra Ray	4,445	2.93	
Independent	Pankaj Kumar	3,512	2.32	
Independent	Chandeshwar Choudhary	3,329	2.19	
Independent	Anand Kumar Rai	3,108	2.05	
BSP	Ashwani Kumar	2,638	1.74	−1.48
Independent	Prabhat Kumar Giri	1,731	1.14	
NOTA	None of the above	1,525	1.01	−1.88
Majority		11,385	7.51	−4.42
Turnout		151,664	56.61	−0.44
RJD hold		Swing		

=== 2015 ===
2015 Bihar Legislative Assembly election: Marhaura
Party	Candidate	Votes	%	±%
RJD	Jeetendra Kumar Rai	66,714	47.61	
BJP	Lal Babu Ray	49,996	35.68	
Independent	Israr Ahmad Khan	7,260	5.18	
BSP	Jai Ram Ray	4,505	3.22	
Independent	Lalu Ray	2,584	1.84	
Independent	Nazre Hassan	1,993	1.42	
BMP	Baleshwar Prasad Yadav	1,278	0.91	
NOTA	None of the above	4,047	2.89	
Majority		16,718	11.93	
Turnout		140,120	57.05	
RJD hold		Swing		
