= Jitendra Kumar Rai =

Indian politician

Member of Bihar Legislative Assembly
- Incumbent
- Assumed office 25 November 2010
- Preceded by: Lal Babu Ray
- Constituency: Marhaura

Minister of Sports Government of Bihar
- In office 10 January 2024 – 28 January 2024
- Chief Minister: Nitish Kumar
- Preceded by: Position Established
- Succeeded by: Samrat Choudhary

Minister of Art, Culture & Youth Affairs Government of Bihar
- In office 16 August 2022 – 28 January 2024
- Chief Minister: Nitish Kumar
- Preceded by: Nitish Kumar
- Succeeded by: Vijay Kumar Sinha

Personal details
- Born: Jitendra Kumar Rai; 1 March 1978 (age 48) Pojhi Buzurg,Saran, Bihar
- Party: Rashtriya Janata Dal (2010-); Janata Dal (United) (before-2010)

Jitendra Kumar Rai (born 1978) is an Indian politician from Bihar. He is a member of Bihar Legislative Assembly from Marhaura representing RJD. He is four time MLA from 2010 to 2025.

== Early life and education ==
Rai is from Marhaura, Saran district, Bihar. He is the son of Yaduvanshi Ray, a two time MLA from Marhaura. He completed his intermediate at Rajendra College in 1994 and later did his graduation at Lok Mahavidyalaya, Hafijpur , Siwan in 1998.

== Career ==
Rai won from Marhaura Assembly constituency representing Rashtriya Janata Dal in the 2020 Bihar Legislative Assembly election. He polled 59,812 votes and defeated his nearest rival, Altaf Alam of Janata Dal (United), by a margin of 11,385 votes. Earlier, he won the 2010 and 2015 Bihar Legislative Assembly elections.
