= Garkha Assembly constituency =

Coordinates: 25°50′06″N 84°52′16″E

Garkha
- Constituency No. 119 for the Bihar Legislative Assembly

Constituency details
- Country: India
- Region: East India
- State: Bihar
- District: Saran
- Lok Sabha constituency: Saran
- Established: 1957
- Total electors: 311,162

Member of Legislative Assembly
- 18th Bihar Legislative Assembly
- Incumbent Surendra Ram
- Party: RJD
- Alliance: MGB
- Elected year: 2025

Garkha is an assembly constituency in Saran district in the Indian state of Bihar. It is reserved for scheduled castes.

Garkha is a small town. Facilities include a police station and hospital. It is 55 km away from the state capital Patna.

== Overview ==
As per Delimitation of Parliamentary and Assembly constituencies Order, 2008, No. 119 Garkha Assembly constituency (SC) is composed of the following: Garkha community development block; Badlu Tola, Lohari, Purwi Telpa, Sherpur, Bishunupura, Khalpura Bala, Maharajganj, Chirand, Jalalpur, Bhairopur Nijamat, Dumari, Musepur, Raipur Bingawa and Kotwa Patti Rampur gram panchayats of Chapra CD Block.

Garkha Assembly constituency (SC) is part of No. 20 Saran (Lok Sabha constituency). It was previously part of Chapra (Lok Sabha constituency).

== Members of the Legislative Assembly ==
Year	Name	Party
1957	Ram Jaipal Singh Yadav	Praja Socialist Party
1962	Shivshankar Prasad Singh	Indian National Congress
1967	Vishwanath Bhagat	Independent politician
1969	Jaglal Chaudhary	Indian National Congress
1972	Raghunandan Majhi	Indian National Congress
1977	Muneshwar Choudhary	Janata Party
1980	Raghunandan Majhi	Indian National Congress
1985	Raghunandan Majhi	Indian National Congress
1990	Muneshwar Choudhary	Independent politician
1995	Muneshwar Choudhary	Janata Dal
2000	Muneshwar Choudhary	Rashtriya Janata Dal
2005	Raghunandan Majhi	Independent politician
2005	Gyanchand Manjhi	Bharatiya Janata Party
2010	Gyanchand Manjhi	Bharatiya Janata Party
2015	Muneshwar Choudhary	Rashtriya Janata Dal
2020	Surendra Ram	Rashtriya Janata Dal
2025	Surendra Ram	Rashtriya Janata Dal

== Election results ==
=== 2025 ===
Bihar Legislative Assembly Election, 2025: Garkha
Party	Candidate	Votes	%	±%
RJD	Surendra Ram	91,134	44.78	▼2.43
LJP(RV)	Simant Mrinal	78,330	38.49	
Independent	Muneshwar Chaudhary	9,453	4.65	
JSP	Manohar Kumar Ram	5,314	2.61	
BSP	Avinash Kumar	3,278	1.61	▲0.34
Independent	Raghunandan Manjhi	2,774	1.36	
Independent	Rajkumar	2,678	1.32	
NOTA	None of the above	2,617	1.29	▼0.9
Majority		12,804	6.29	▲0.67
Turnout		203,497	65.4	▲7.87
RJD hold		Swing		

=== 2020 ===
Bihar Assembly election, 2020: Garkha
Party	Candidate	Votes	%	±%
RJD	Surendra Ram	83,412	47.21	−9.38
BJP	Gyanchand Manjhi	73,475	41.59	+10.29
JAP(L)	Muneshwar Choudhary	4,419	2.5	+1.97
Independent	Bigan Manjhi	2,874	1.63	
Independent	Shiv Prasad Manjhi	2,681	1.52	
BSP	Sabita Devi	2,247	1.27	+0.87
NOTA	None of the above	3,874	2.19	−1.0
Majority		9,937	5.62	−19.67
Turnout		176,670	57.53	+1.83
RJD hold		Swing		

=== 2015 ===
2015 Bihar Legislative Assembly election: Garkha
Party	Candidate	Votes	%	±%
RJD	Muneshwar Chaudhary	89,249	56.59	
BJP	Gyanchand Manjhi	49,366	31.3	
Independent	Sampat Ram Rahi	4,723	2.99	
CPI	Shivji Das	2,246	1.42	
Independent	Raghunandan Manjhi	2,224	1.41	
NOTA	None of the above	5,027	3.19	
Majority		39,883	25.29	
Turnout		157,714	55.7	
