= Marhaura =

Marhaura Marhowrah
- Town
- Location in Bihar, India
- Coordinates: 25.97°N 84.87°E
- Country: India
- State: Bihar
- District: Saran
- Elevation: 52 m (171 ft)

Population (2011)
  - Total: 29,932

Languages
  - Official: Bhojpuri, Hindi
- Time zone: UTC+5:30 (IST)
- PIN: 841418
- Lok Sabha constituency: Saran
- Vidhan Sabha constituency: Marhaura

Marhaura (also spelt as Marhowrah) is a town in the administrative sub-division area of the same name, in Saran district in the Indian state of Bihar. It is Marhaura (Vidhan Sabha constituency). Marhaura was the industrial hub of Saran in the 1980s.

== Geography ==
Marhaura is located at 25.97°N 84.87°E. It has an average elevation of 52 metres (170 feet). Marhaura is 26 km from the nearest city, Chhapra, and has good connectivity of transportation by rail and road.

== Demographics ==
As of 2001 India census, Marhaura had a population of 24,534. Males constitute 52% of the population and females 48%. Marhaura has an average literacy rate of 42%, lower than the national average of 59.5%: male literacy is 54%, and female literacy is 29%. In Marhaura, 19% of the population is under 6 years of age.

== Cultural buildings ==
There is a Shakti pitha temple, Gadhdevi Maa and an ancient temple of lord Shiva located at Shilhauri, that has many faithful followers. Both the temples are situated either side of railway station and 2 km from the railway station.

== Rail Diesel Locomotive Engine Factory ==
Former Rail Minister Lalu Prasad had proposed a rail diesel engine factory in Marhaura, Saran however nothing happened after announcement. Finally land has been acquired in 2016-17 and construction work has started and chances are construction will be completed in 2018. The contract to develop the factory is being awarded to the American company GE.
