= Ram Pravesh Rai =

Indian politician

Member of Bihar Legislative Assembly
- In office 2005–2010
- Constituency: Chapra

Personal details
- Born: 1966-2014 Narharpur]
- Party: Janata Dal (United)
- Spouse: Pataso Devi
- Children: Anand Ray
- Parent: Hardev Ray (father)
- Occupation: Politician

Ram Pravesh Rai is an Indian politician and a Member of the Bihar Legislative Assembly from Chapra constituency and former president district council.

== Political life ==
Rai was elected in February 2005 Bihar Legislative Assembly election and October 2005 Bihar Legislative Assembly election from Chapra constituency.
