= Panapur =

Village in Bihar, India

Panapur is a village in Bihar, India.
