= Karishma Rai =

Indian politician

Karishma Rai is an Indian politician from Bihar. She is a member of the Bihar Legislative Assembly from Parsa Assembly constituency Saran district. She won the 2025 Bihar Legislative Assembly election representing the Rashtriya Janata Dal. She contested on RJD and defeated sitting MLA Chhote Lal Ray who defected from RJD to the Janata Dal (United) party. She won by a margin of 25,772 votes.
