= Chhoti Kumari =

Indian politician

Member of the Bihar Legislative Assembly
- Incumbent
- Assumed office 14 November 2025
- Preceded by: C. N. Gupta
- Constituency: Chapra

Personal details
- Party: Bharatiya Janata Party
- Profession: Politician

Chhoti Kumari is an Indian politician from Bihar. She is elected as a Member of Legislative Assembly in 2025 Bihar Legislative Assembly election from Chapra constituency. She is a member of the Bharatiya Janata Party
