= Amnour =

- Interactive map of Amnour
- Country: India
- State: Bihar
- District: Saran
- Division: Saran
- Elevation: 57 m (187 ft)
- Time zone: UTC+05:30 (IST)
- Std. Code: 06159
- Pin code: 841401

Amnour is a block in Saran district of Bihar state, India. Amnour's block headquarters is Amnour town. It belongs to Saran division. It is located 32 km north of the district headquarters Chhapra, and 52 km south of the state capital Patna. Amnour block is bounded by Marhaurah block to the west, Isuapur block to the west, Maker block to the east, and Taraiya block to the north. Marhaura City, Dighwara City, Lalganj City, and Lalganj City are the cities near Amnour.

Amnour consists of 19 villages and 19 panchayats. Arna, Chak is the smallest village and Amnaur Harnaraen is the largest. It is in the 57 meter elevation (altitude). This place is on the border of Saran district and Vaishali district.

== Demographics ==
The 2011 census report on the total population of Amnour block was 168,339 living in 24,643 houses, spread across a total of 19 villages and 19 panchayats. Males were 86,326 and females were 82,013.

== Weather and climate ==
Amnour's summer highest day temperature is between 25.8 °C and 42 °C. The average temperature in January is 12.5 °C, February is 19 °C, March is 26 °C, April is 30.3 °C, and May is 33 °C.
