= Chapra, Bihar Assembly constituency =

Assembly constituency in Bihar, India

Coordinates: 25°47′05″N 84°43′39″E

Chapra, Bihar
- Constituency No. - for the Bihar Legislative Assembly
- Location in Saran

Constituency details
- Country: India
- Region: East India
- State: Bihar
- District: Saran
- Established: 1957
- Total electors: 325,112

Member of Legislative Assembly
- 18th Bihar Legislative Assembly
- Incumbent Chhoti Kumari
- Party: BJP
- Alliance: NDA
- Elected year: 2025

Chapra (pronounced Chhapra) is an assembly constituency in Saran district in the Indian state of Bihar. In 2015 Bihar Legislative Assembly election, Chapra was one of the 36 seats to have VVPAT enabled electronic voting machines.

== Overview ==
Chhapra assembly seat has a unique distinction of electing either a Rajput or Yadav since 1967 belonging to various parties. The dominating caste, after delimitation is Vaishya which accounts for 65,000 of the 2.89 lakh voters. The vaishya community has 10-12% population in Chhapra.

As per Delimitation of Parliamentary and Assembly constituencies Order, 2008, No. 118 Chapra Assembly constituency is composed of the following: Chhapra municipality and Naini, Fakuli, Karinga, Sadha, Mouna, Tenua and Barhara Mahaji gram panchayats of Chapra community development block; Rivilganj CD Block.

Chapra Assembly constituency is part of No. 20 Saran (Lok Sabha constituency). It was earlier part of Chapra (Lok Sabha constituency). Chhapra assembly seat had a unique distinction of electing either a Rajput or Yadav since 1965 till 2014 belonging to various parties. Randhir Kumar Singh (RJD) won the by-poll from Chhapra in 2014. First time, a non-Yadav non-Rajput Dr. C. N. Gupta (BJP) won from assembly seat in 2015 Bihar Legislative Assembly election.

== Members of the Legislative Assembly ==
Year	Name	Party
1957	Prabhunath Singh	Indian National Congress
1957	Jaglal Chaudhary	Indian National Congress
1962	Sundri Devi	Indian National Congress
1967	Uday Pratap N. Singh	Bharatiya Jana Sangh
1969	Janak Yadav	Praja Socialist Party
1972	Janak Yadav	Indian National Congress
1977	Mithlesh Kumar Singh	Janata Party
1980	Janak Yadav	Janata Party
1985	Janak Yadav	Independent
1990	Udit Rai	Independent
1995	Udit Rai	Janata Dal
2000	Udit Rai	Rashtriya Janata Dal
2005	Ram Pravesh Rai	Janata Dal (United)
2005	Ram Pravesh Rai	Janata Dal (United)
2010	Janardan Singh Sigriwal	Bharatiya Janata Party
2014^	Randhir Kumar Singh	Rashtriya Janata Dal
2015	C. N. Gupta	Bharatiya Janata Party
2020	C. N. Gupta	Bharatiya Janata Party
2025	Chhoti Kumari	Bharatiya Janata Party

== Election results ==
=== 2025 ===
2025 Bihar Legislative Assembly election: Chapra
Party	Candidate	Votes	%	±%
BJP	Chhoti Kumari	86,845	45.86	▲0.89
RJD	Khesari Lal Yadav	79,245	41.84	▲0.89
Independent	Rakhi Gupta	11,488	6.07	
JSP	Jai Prakash Singh	3,433	1.81	
ASP(KR)	Shak Naushad	2,093	1.11	
Independent	Rana Yashwant Pratap Singh	2,026	1.07	
NOTA	None of the above	2,706	1.43	▲0.29
Majority		7,600	4.02	▲0.0
Turnout		189,389	58.25	▲7.26
BJP gain from RJD		Swing	NDA	

=== 2020 ===
2020 Bihar Legislative Assembly election: Chapra
Party	Candidate	Votes	%	±%
BJP	Dr. C. N. Gupta	75,710	44.97	▼0.3
RJD	Randhir Kumar Singh	68,939	40.95	▲2.87
Independent	Sunil Kumar	6,062	3.6	
Independent	Sanjeev Kumar Singh	3,744	2.22	
Independent	Subhash Ray	3,193	1.9	
BSP	Manoj Mahato	2,909	1.73	▼0.78
NOTA	None of the above	1,920	1.14	▼1.06
Majority		6,771	4.02	▼3.17
Turnout		168,361	50.99	▼0.88
BJP hold		Swing		

=== 2015 ===
2015 Bihar Legislative Assembly election: Chapra
Party	Candidate	Votes	%	±%
BJP	Dr. C. N. Gupta	71,646	45.27	
RJD	Randhir Kumar Singh	60,267	38.08	
Independent	Udit Rai	5,707	3.61	
Independent	Kanhaiya Singh	5,176	3.27	
BSP	Subhash Rai	3,969	2.51	
Independent	Santosh Kumar Mishra	2,837	1.79	
NOTA	None of the above	3,488	2.2	
Majority		11,379	7.19	
Turnout		158,247	51.87	

=== 2014 bypoll ===
Bihar Assembly election, 2010: Chapra, Bihar
Party	Candidate	Votes	%	±%
RJD	Randhir Kumar Singh			
Independent	C. N. Gupta			
BJP	Kanhaiya Singh			
NOTA	None of the Above			
Majority				
Turnout				
Registered electors				
RJD gain from BJP		Swing		

=== 2010 ===
2010 Bihar Legislative Assembly election: Chapra
Party	Candidate	Votes	%	±%
BJP	Janardan Singh Sigriwal	61,045	53.36	
RJD	Pramendra Ranjan Singh	25,174	22.00	
Independent	Subhash Ray	7,626	6.67	
INC	Anil Kumar Singh	4,322	3.78	
BSP	Rajeshnath Prasad	2,063	1.80	
Independent	Siyaram Singh	1,306	1.14	
Independent	Praveen Kumar Alias Piku Yadav	1,297	1.13	
JD(S)	Rambabu Rai	1,189	1.04	
Independent	Randhir Rai	1,178	1.03	
NCP	Amita Devi	1,059	0.93	
Independent	Ramjee Singh	1,048	0.92	
Independent	Arif Khan	958	0.84	
JP(S)	Jitendra Kumar Singh	956	0.84	
Independent	Tarkeshwar Singh	892	0.78	
Independent	Mukesh Kumar Singh	840	0.73	
Independent	Gyani Kumar Sharma	839	0.73	
Independent	Indrajit Rai	765	0.67	
Independent	Rajnarayan Gupta	525	0.46	
Independent	Amiteshwar Sahay	369	0.32	
Independent	Sunita Kumari	352	0.31	
BED	Rajendra Mahto	339	0.30	
SP	Sandeep Kumar	264	0.23	
Majority		35,871	31.36	
Turnout		114,406	44.9	
BJP gain from JD(U)		Swing		

=== 2005 ===
February 2005 Bihar Legislative Assembly election : Chapra
Party	Candidate	Votes	%	±%
JD(U)	Ram Parvash Rai	33,776	36.88	
RJD	Udit Rai	31,527	34.41	
Independent	Subhash Rai	4,602	5.03	
Independent	Laxman Rai	2,180	2.38	
Independent	Ramjee Singh	1,466	1.60	
BSP	Harendar Rai	1,387	1.51	
Independent	Vinod Singh	1,112	1.21	
Independent	Arun Kumar	1,099	1.20	
AD(K)	Ashok Kumar	1,085	1.18	
Independent	Jitendra Kumar	684	0.75	
Bharatiya Momin Front	Md Beraj	657	0.72	
Independent	Brajesh Kumar	617	0.67	
Independent	Sanjay Rai	585	0.64	
SP	Birendra Kumar	563	0.61	
Independent	Rabish Chandra	534	0.58	
Independent	Nutan Devi	487	0.53	
Independent	Raju Rai	464	0.51	
Independent	Nand Kishore	327	0.36	
Majority		2,249	2.46	
Turnout		91,562		
JD(U) gain from RJD		Swing		

=== 2000 ===
2000 Bihar Legislative Assembly election: Chapra
Party	Candidate	Votes	%	±%
RJD	Udit Rai	76,749	52.89	
BJP	Rambabu Ray	54,030	37.23	
Independent	Jai Narayan Singh Solanki	7,486	5.16	
INC	Jitendra Kr Singh	2,014	1.39	
CPI	Surendra Prasad Yadav	1,975	1.36	
BSP	Chandra Bhushan Prasad	838	0.58	
Independent	Sheodas Singh	417	0.29	
Independent	Laxmi Narayan Yadav	358	0.25	
BJC	Purushotam Singh	308	0.21	
Independent	Birendra Kumar Yadav	301	0.21	
Independent	Brajesh Kumar	167	0.12	
Ajeya Bharat Party	Rabindra Singh	111	0.08	
Independent	Brahmdeo Narain Gyani	86	0.06	
Independent	Bhagat Singh	76	0.05	
Independent	Harendra Ray	64	0.04	
AD(K)	Muneshwar Prasad	55	0.04	
Independent	Abhay Kumar Singh	45	0.03	
Independent	Birendra Prasad	37	0.03	
Majority		22,719	15.66	
Turnout		145,117	73.58	
RJD gain from JD		Swing		

=== 1995 ===
1995 Bihar Legislative Assembly election: Chapra
Party	Candidate	Votes	%	±%
JD	Udit Rai	31,577	31.7	
INC	Janak Yadav	23,618	23.71	
BJP	Jai Narayan Singh Solanki	19,138	19.21	
Independent	Ram Babu Rai	12,140	12.19	
Samata Party	Mithilesh Kumar Singh	904	0.91	
Bhartiya Pragatisheel Party	Yashwant Singh	164	0.16	
Independent	Yogender Prasad Yadav	49	0.05	
Independent	Abhay Kumar Singh	35	0.04	
Independent	Vishavjit Sinha	35	0.04	
Independent	Suman Kumar	29	0.03	
Independent	Uday Kumar Mishra	21	0.02	
Independent	Rameshwar Prasad Sinha	20	0.02	
Independent	Heera Lal Rai	19	0.02	
Independent	Mahesh Singh	13	0.01	
Independent	Nagender Pandey	13	0.01	
Independent	Anjani Singh	10	0.01	
Majority		7,959	7.99	
Turnout		99,613	55.04	
JD gain from Independent		Swing		

=== 1990 ===
1990 Bihar Legislative Assembly election: Chapra
Party	Candidate	Votes	%	±%
Independent	Udit Rai	65,355	49.08	
JD	Janak Yadau	46,292	34.76	
BJP	Ganesh Koo Singh	10,480	7.87	
INC	Ram Shekher Singh	9,322	7.00	
Independent	Surendra Nath Tiwari	535	0.40	
BSP	Om Prakash Sharma	443	0.33	
Independent	Suresh Singh	333	0.25	
Janata Party (JP)	Raghubansh Singh	114	0.09	
Independent	Ramjee Singh	82	0.06	
Independent	Reoti Raman Prasad	62	0.05	
Independent	Ramedeo Singh	53	0.04	
Independent	Krishna Roy	41	0.03	
Independent	Raja Baboo Prasad	31	0.02	
Independent	Nityanand Singh	24	0.02	
Majority		19,063	14.32	
Turnout		133,167	66.27	
Independent hold		Swing		

=== 1985 ===
1985 Bihar Legislative Assembly election: Chapra
Party	Candidate	Votes	%	±%
Independent	Janak Yadav	46,438	50.99	
INC	Mithilesh Kumar Singh	36,153	39.70	
Janta Party	Ramjanam Gupta	3,834	4.21	
BJP	Sabhapati Vishwakarma	3,689	4.05	
Independent	Nawal Kishore Nirala	353	0.39	
Independent	Satya Narain Prasad	225	0.25	
Independent	Ramji Singh	144	0.16	
Independent	Ramdeo Singh	123	0.14	
Independent	Keshari Nandan Sinha	117	0.13	
Majority		10,285	11.29	
Turnout		91,076	59.6	
Independent gain from JP		Swing		

=== 1980 ===
1980 Bihar Legislative Assembly election: Chapra
Party	Candidate	Votes	%	±%
JP	Janak Yadav	27,568	34.14	
Janata Party (JP)	Mithilesh Kumar Singh	21,838	27.04	
BJP	Subhapati Bishwakarma	13,311	16.48	
INC(I)	Hira Lal Rai	13,116	16.24	
Independent	Baldeo Singh	3,269	4.05	
Independent	Anirudh Singh	796	0.99	
Independent	Birendra Maharaj	358	0.44	
Janata Party (secular) - Raj Narain	Ravindra Prasad Verma	214	0.27	
Independent	Ram Pratap Singh	141	0.17	
Independent	Hari Ram Singh	139	0.17	
Majority		5,730	7.10	
Turnout		80,750	54.35	
JP hold		Swing		

=== 1977 ===
1977 Bihar Legislative Assembly election: Chapra
Party	Candidate	Votes	%	±%
JP	Mithlesh Kumar Singh	32,865	51.55	
Independent	Janak Yadav	14,978	23.49	
INC	Ram Jaipal Singh Yadav	13,734	21.54	
Independent	Shankar Prasad	5,400	0.85	
Independent	Mukhtar Ahmed	4,320	0.68	
Independent	Ramji Singh	4,230	0.66	
Independent	Rameshwar Prasad Rajpal	4,020	0.63	
Independent	Lalit Mohan Singh Yadav	1,240	0.19	
Independent	Shrimati Sundari Devi	1,050	0.16	
Independent	Shiv Kumar Singh	1,040	0.16	
Independent	Udai Pratap N Singh	450	0.07	
Majority		17,887	28.07	
Turnout		63,752	55.43	
JP gain from INC		Swing		

=== 1972 ===
1972 Bihar Legislative Assembly election: Chapra
Party	Candidate	Votes	%	±%
INC	Janak Yadav	30,240	43.43	
INC(O)	Udai Pratap N Singh	23,172	33.28	
ABJS	Lal Babu Roy	13,870	19.92	
Independent	Prahalad Singh	1,104	1.59	
SSP	Dhanjaya Prasad Singh	946	1.36	
Independent	Rameshwar Prasad Rajpal	297	0.43	
Majority		7,068	10.15	
Turnout		69,629	65.24	

=== 1957 ===
In the 1969 Bihar Legislative Assembly election, Janak Yadav of the Praja Socialist Party won the Chapra constituency. In the 1967 Bihar Legislative Assembly election, Uday Pratap N Singh of Bharatiya Jana Sangh won the Chapra assembly seat. In the 1962, Bihar Vidhan Sabha elections, Sundri Devi of the Indian National Congress (INC) won the Chapra assembly seat.1957, Bihar Vidhan Sabha elections, Prabhunath Singh and Jaglal Chaudhary of the Indian National Congress (INC) won the Chapra assembly seat.
