= Saran district =

District in Bihar, India

- District
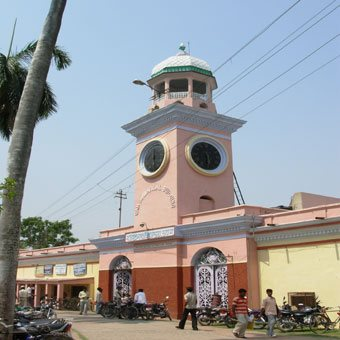

- Location of Saran district in Bihar
- Coordinates (Chhapra): 25°55′N 84°45′E
- Country: India
- State: Bihar
- Division: Saran
- Headquarters: Chhapra
- Tehsils: 20

Government
  - Lok Sabha constituencies: 1. Saran, 2. Maharajganj (shared with Siwan district)
  - Vidhan Sabha constituencies: Ekma, Manjhi, Baniapur, Taraiya, Marhaura, Chapra, Garkha, Amnour, Parsa, Sonpur

Area
  - Total: 2,641 km^{2} (1,020 sq mi)

Population (2011)
  - Total: 3,951,862
  - Density: 1,496/km^{2} (3,876/sq mi)

Demographics
  - Literacy: 83.2% (2024)
  - Sex ratio: 949
- Time zone: UTC+05:30 (IST)
- PIN Code: 841206
- Major highways: NH 28B, NH 85, NH 101, NH 102, NH 19
- Website: saran.nic.in

Saran district is one of the 38 districts of Indian state of Bihar. The district, part of Saran Division, is also known as Chhapra district after the headquarters of the district, Chhapra.

It is considered as one of the richest zamindaris of Bihar after Raj Darbhanga, Hathwa Raj, Bettiah Raj and Raj Najarganj, Saran Raj Bhatkeshri Estate.

== Typonym ==
It is said that "Saran" is a corrupted form of the word Sarangaranya (forest of deer). According to legend, earlier it was a dense forest full of deer and the home of Rishi Sarangi. Another suggestion is that the name is corruption of Sakra-aranya (the forest of Indra).

== History ==
One of the earliest reliable historical references to the region dates back to 898 CE, when the village of Dighwara Dubauli in present-day Saran produced a copper plate inscription issued during the reign of King Mahendrapal Deva.

=== Medieval Period ===
According to the Ain-i-Akbari, Saran was one of the six sarkars (revenue divisions) forming the province of Bihar during the Mughal period. By the time the Diwani (revenue administration) was granted to the East India Company in 1765, the number of sarkars had increased to eight, including Saran and Champaran. These two were later merged into a single administrative unit known as Saran.

=== British Era ===
When Commissioner’s Divisions were established in 1829, Saran—along with Champaran—was placed under the Patna Division. The two regions were separated in 1866, when Champaran became an independent district.

Saran became part of the Tirhut Division when it was created in 1908. At that time, the district consisted of three subdivisions:

- Saran
- Siwan
- Gopalganj

In 1972, all three subdivisions were elevated to full-fledged districts. The present-day Saran district, after the separation of Siwan and Gopalganj, continues to have its headquarters at Chhapra.

== Etymology ==
Several theories explain the origin of the name Saran:

- General Cunningham suggested that Saran was earlier known as “Saran” or “Asylum,” associated with a stupa or pillar built by Emperor Ashoka.
- Another theory proposes that the name originates from Saranga-Aranya, meaning “deer forest”, reflecting the region’s prehistoric landscape, which was once covered with forests inhabited by deer.

== Geography ==
Saran district is primarily served by the Gandak, Ghaghara, and Ganga rivers, which play a significant role in shaping the region’s topography and agriculture. The confluence of the Ghaghara and Ganga near Saran is one of the notable geographical features of the area. Numerous minor streams and seasonal rivulets flow through the district, contributing to its fertile soil but also making certain parts prone to seasonal flooding. Like much of northern Bihar, the district lies within the fertile Gangetic plain.

Saran district spans an area of 2,641 square kilometres (1,020 sq mi). It is bordered by Siwan and Gopalganj districts to the west, Muzaffarpur and Vaishali districts to the east, and the Ganga River to the south, across which lie Patna and Bhojpur districts. To the north, it is bounded by parts of Gopalganj and Siwan. The district’s terrain is largely alluvial and flat, with agriculture dominating land use across most of the region.

The district of Saran is situated between 25°36' and 26°13' north latitude and 84°24' and 85°15' east longitude in the southern post of the Saran Division of North Bihar.

== Demographics ==
Saran District Census 2011: Key Demographic Data
| Description | 2011 (Figures) |
|---|---|
| Population | 39.52 Lakhs (3,951,862) |
| Male Population | 2,022,821 |
| Female Population | 1,929,041 |
| Sex Ratio (Females per 1000 Males) | 954 |
| Child Population (0–6 years) | 681,142 |
| Male Child Population (0–6 years) | 353,738 |
| Female Child Population (0–6 years) | 327,404 |
| Child Sex Ratio (0–6 years) | 926 |
| Child Proportion (0–6 years) | 17.24% |
| Boys Proportion (0–6 years) | 17.49% |
| Girls Proportion (0–6 years) | 16.97% |
| Literates | 2,157,454 |
| Male Literates | 1,285,767 |
| Female Literates | 871,687 |
| Average Literacy Rate | 65.96% |
| Male Literacy Rate | 77.03% |
| Female Literacy Rate | 54.42% |
| Number of Subdivisions | 3 |
| Area (sq. km) | 2,641 |
| Population Density (per km²) | 1,496 |
| Proportion to Bihar Population | 3.80% |

=== Population ===
According to the 2011 Census, Saran district has a population of 3,951,862, roughly equal to the nation of Liberia or the US state of Oregon. This gives the district a population ranking of 60th in India (out of 640 districts). Saran has a population density of 1,493 inhabitants per square kilometre (3,870/sq mi). The district recorded a population growth rate of 21.37% over the decade from 2001 to 2011.

Saran has a sex ratio of 949 females for every 1,000 males, and a literacy rate of 68.57%. Additionally, 8.94% of the district’s population lives in urban areas roughly equal to the nation of Liberia or the US state of Oregon.

=== Religion ===
Religions in Saran district (2011 Census)
| Religion | Number of Followers | Percentage |
|---|---|---|
| Hinduism | 3,534,772 | 89.45% |
| Islam | 406,449 | 10.28% |
| Religion not stated | 7,282 | 0.18% |
| Christian | 2,330 | 0.06% |
| Sikh | 371 | 0.01% |
| Jain | 322 | 0.01% |
| Buddhist | 229 | 0.01% |
| Other religions and persuasions | 107 | 0% |

Hindus constitute the overwhelming majority of the district’s population, followed by Muslims.

=== Language ===
Languages of Saran district (2011 Census)
| Language | Percentage | Number of Speakers |
|---|---|---|
| Bhojpuri | 93.16% | 3,679,108 |
| Hindi | 4.45% | 175,708 |
| Urdu | 2.28% | 90,030 |
| Others | 0.11% | 4,997 |

At the time of the 2011 Census of India, 93.16% of the population in Saran district spoke Bhojpuri as their first language, 4.45% spoke Hindi, and 2.28% spoke Urdu.

Bhojpuri is a language belonging to the Bihari language group, with nearly 40 million speakers, and is written in both the Devanagari and Kaithi scripts.

=== Literacy ===
Literacy Rates in Saran district (2011 Census)
| Category | Average Literacy Rate | Male Literacy Rate | Female Literacy Rate |
|---|---|---|---|
| Total Population | 65.96% | 77.03% | 54.42% |
| Urban Area | 75.13% | 82.32% | 67.24% |
| Rural Area | 65.04% | 76.49% | 53.17% |

=== Urban and Rural Distribution ===
Urban and Rural Population of Saran district (2011 Census)
| Area | Total Population | Male | Female | Percentage of Total Population | Sex Ratio (Females per 1000 Males) |
|---|---|---|---|---|---|
| Urban | 353,202 | 184,702 | 168,500 | 8.94% | 913 |
| Rural | 3,598,660 | 1,838,119 | 1,760,541 | 91.06% | 958 |

=== Caste Composition ===
Scheduled Castes (SC) and Scheduled Tribes (ST) in Saran district
| Group | Total Population | Male | Female | Sex Ratio (Females per 1000 Males) |
|---|---|---|---|---|
| Scheduled Castes (SC) | 474,066 | 242,976 | 231,090 | 952 |
| Scheduled Tribes (ST) | 36,786 | 18,322 | 18,464 | 1008 |

=== Historical Population of Saran District ===
Historical Population of Saran District (1901–2011)
| Year | Population | Variation | Variation % | Male | Female |
|---|---|---|---|---|---|
| 1901 | 9,59,000 | - | - | 4,36,000 | 5,23,000 |
| 1911 | 9,12,000 | -47,700 | -4.97% | 4,24,000 | 4,88,000 |
| 1921 | 9,32,000 | 20,100 | 2.20% | 4,51,000 | 4,81,000 |
| 1931 | 9,90,000 | 58,350 | 6.26% | 4,86,000 | 5,04,000 |
| 1941 | 11,39,000 | 1,49,000 | 15.03% | 5,47,000 | 5,92,000 |
| 1951 | 12,56,000 | 1,17,000 | 10.30% | 5,89,000 | 6,67,000 |
| 1961 | 14,47,000 | 1,91,000 | 15.20% | 6,74,000 | 7,73,000 |
| 1971 | 17,10,000 | 2,62,000 | 18.13% | 8,33,000 | 8,77,000 |
| 1981 | 20,84,000 | 3,75,000 | 21.91% | 10,32,000 | 10,52,000 |
| 1991 | 25,73,000 | 4,89,000 | 23.44% | 13,11,000 | 12,62,000 |
| 2001 | 32,49,000 | 6,76,000 | 26.26% | 16,53,000 | 15,96,000 |
| 2011 | 39,52,000 | 7,03,000 | 21.64% | 20,23,000 | 19,29,000 |

== Politics ==
| District | No. | Constituency | Name | Party | Alliance | Remarks |
|---|---|---|---|---|---|---|
| Saran | 113 | Ekma | Manoranjan Singh Dhumal | JD(U) | NDA | |
| Saran | 114 | Manjhi | Randhir Kumar Singh | JD(U) | NDA | |
| Saran | 115 | Baniapur | Kedar Nath Singh | BJP | NDA | |
| Saran | 116 | Taraiya | Janak Singh | BJP | NDA | |
| Saran | 117 | Marhaura | Jitendra Kumar Ray | RJD | MGB | |
| Saran | 118 | Chapra | Chhoti Kumari | BJP | NDA | |
| Saran | 119 | Garkha (SC) | Surendra Ram | RJD | MGB | |
| Saran | 120 | Amnour | Krishan Kumar Mantoo | BJP | NDA | |
| Saran | 121 | Parsa | Karishma Rai | RJD | MGB | |
| Saran | 122 | Sonpur | Vinay Kumar Singh | BJP | NDA | |

== Economy & Industry ==
Agriculture is the primary economic activity in Saran district, with major crops including paddy, wheat, sugarcane, potato, and maize. The district’s soil is predominantly alluvial, and the diara areas along the beds of its three rivers are highly fertile, although they are subject to periodic flooding. There are no minerals of significant economic value in the region. Over the years, the economy of Saran has experienced sustained growth, with the sugar factories in the district playing a major role in shaping its industrial landscape.

=== Industries ===
Saran district hosts several notable industrial units. The Rail Wheel Factory is located at Bela, Chhapra, and a Diesel Locomotive Factory, Marhowrah. These units contribute significantly to the district’s industrial development and employment opportunities.

=== Leather Cluster ===
Saran district also has a prominent leather cluster known for manufacturing ladies’ and gents’ chappals and Nagra shoes. The cluster comprises 68 functional units, generating an annual turnover of approximately ₹405 lakh and providing employment to around 3,300 people.

=== Banking ===
Banking Infrastructure in Saran District
| Parameter | Details |
|---|---|
| Lead Bank | Bank of India |
| Number of other Scheduled Banks | 12 |
| Number of Branches of other Scheduled Banks | 72 |
| Name of Regional Rural Banks | 64 |
| Number of Branches of Co-operative Banks | 18 |
| Number of Branches of LDBs | 6 |

== Government ==
The present collector and District Magistrate of Saran is IAS Aman Samir. The Divisional Commissioner is Gopal Meena (I.A.S).

The district has three subdivisions, 20 community development blocks and 1,807 villages.

=== Sub-divisions ===
Sub-divisions of Saran District
| Sl. No. | Sub-division Name |
|---|---|
| 1 | Chhapra |
| 2 | Marhaura |
| 3 | Sonpur |

=== Blocks of Saran District ===
Blocks of Saran District with Population
| Sl. No. | Block Name | Population |
|---|---|---|
| 1 | Amnour | 200,395 |
| 2 | Baniyapur | 262,673 |
| 3 | Chhapra | 442,639 |
| 4 | Dariyapur | 296,164 |
| 5 | Dighwara | 129,552 |
| 6 | Ekma | 214,445 |
| 7 | Garkha | 268,156 |
| 8 | Ishupur | 146,822 |
| 9 | Jalalpur | 174,156 |
| 10 | Lahladpur | 79,969 |
| 11 | Maker | 84,695 |
| 12 | Manjhi | 268,073 |
| 13 | Marhaura | 265,123 |
| 14 | Mashrakh | 188,899 |
| 15 | Nagra | 124,028 |
| 16 | Panapur | 121,738 |
| 17 | Parsa | 155,838 |
| 18 | Revelganj | 119,660 |
| 19 | Sonpur | 270,116 |
| 20 | Taraiya | 138,721 |

=== Panchayats Summary per Block ===
| Sl. No. | Block Name | Total Panchayats |
|---|---|---|
| 1 | Lahladpur | 8 |
| 2 | Maker | 8 |
| 3 | Isuapur | 13 |
| 4 | Sadar | 21 |
| 5 | Jalalpur | 15 |
| 6 | Nagra | 10 |
| 7 | Dighwara | 10 |
| 8 | Taraiya | 13 |
| 9 | Ekma | 18 |
| 10 | Parsa | 13 |
| 11 | Amnour | 18 |
| 12 | Rivilganj | 9 |
| 13 | Mashrak | 17 |
| 14 | Dariyapur | 22 |
| 15 | Marhaura | 21 |
| 16 | Sonpur | 23 |
| 17 | Panapur | 8 |
| 18 | Baniyapur | 25 |
| 19 | Manjhi | 25 |
| 20 | Garkha | 23 |

== Heritage & Tourism ==
Saran district is home to several sites of historical, cultural, and religious significance. The district attracts both domestic and international visitors due to its ancient temples, ashrams, and archaeological sites. The following table highlights the major tourist and heritage sites in Saran along with a brief description of their importance

Major Tourist Sites in Saran District
| S.No | Site Name | Description |
|---|---|---|
| 1 | Aami | Situated about 28 km east of Chhapra. Maharaja Daksha and King Surat are said to have practised asceticism here. Contains an old Durga temple known as Ambasthan, a garden, and a deep perennial well. |
| 2 | Sonepur | Located at the confluence of the Ganga and Gandak rivers. Famous for Harihar Kshetra Mela on Kartik Purnima, attracting domestic and international visitors. Legend: Lord Vishnu and Lord Shiva resolved the fight between Gaj (elephant) and Ghariyal (crocodile) here. Mela lasts more than a fortnight. |
| 3 | Dhorn Ashram | Contains many exhibits of archaeological importance. Features the ancient temple of Bhagwan Dhadheswarnath on the bank of river Gandaki, with a gigantic stone Shivling. |
| 4 | Gautham Asthan | Ashram of Gautam Rishi, located 5 km west of Chhapra. Believed to be the site where Ahilya, wife of sage Gautam, was redeemed from her curse. |
| 5 | Silhauri | Important according to Shiv Puran and Ram Charitra Manas. Believed that Lord Indra and Yamraj tested King Shivi here. A mela is organised every Shivratri for devotees of Baba Shilanath. |
| 6 | Chirand | Located 11 km east of Chhapra. Archaeological excavations revealed a 4,000-year-old developed neo-lithic culture. Inhabitants were engaged in animal husbandry, agriculture, and hunting. |

== Education ==
Saran district has a well-established network of educational institutions ranging from universities and constituent colleges to technical, professional and teacher-training institutes. The district is served primarily by Jai Prakash University, Chhapra, which oversees most degree colleges in Saran and neighbouring districts.

=== Constituent and Degree Colleges ===
Constituent and Degree Colleges in Saran District
| Name of College | Location | Type / Affiliation | Notable Details |
|---|---|---|---|
| Rajendra College | Chapra | Constituent – Jai Prakash University | Established in 1938; offers Intermediate, UG and PG programmes. |
| Ganga Singh College | Chapra | Constituent – Jai Prakash University | Offers courses in Arts and Science. |
| Jagdam College | Chapra | Constituent – Jai Prakash University | Major college located near NH-19. |
| Jaglal Choudhary College | Chapra | Constituent – Jai Prakash University | Offers undergraduate programmes in Arts and Science. |
| Ram Jaipal College | Chapra | Constituent – Jai Prakash University | Postgraduate and degree college on Dak Bunglow Road. |
| Jai Prakash Mahila College | Chapra | Constituent – Jai Prakash University | Women's college offering UG and PG courses. |
| P.C. Vigyan College | Chapra | Constituent – Jai Prakash University | Science-focused college. |
| Hotilal Ramnath College | Amnour | Constituent – Jai Prakash University | Serves the Amnour region. |
| Yadu Nandan College | Dighwara | Degree College (Affiliated to JPU) | Provides undergraduate courses. |
| Nand Lal Singh College | Daudpur | Degree College (Affiliated to JPU) | Serves Daudpur and nearby rural areas. |
| Prabhunath College | Parsa | Degree College (Affiliated to JPU) | Located in Parsa block. |
| S.D.S. College | Chapra | Degree College (Affiliated to JPU) | Offers programs in Arts. |
| Tapeshwar Singh College | Chapra | Degree College (Affiliated to JPU) | Provides undergraduate education. |

=== Technical and Professional Institutions ===
Saran district also has institutions offering engineering, technology, medical and professional training:

- Loknayak Jai Prakash Institute of Technology(L.N.J.P.I.T.), Chapra – A government engineering college offering B.Tech programmes in several branches.
- Government Medical College and Hospital, Chapra
- Government Teachers’ Training College, Chapra – Provides B.Ed and teacher-training programmes.
- Moti Singh Jogeshwari Ayurved College and Hospital, Chapra – An institution offering Ayurvedic medical education.

== Transport ==
Chhapra is well-connected by rail and road, with a major railway junction and several national highways.

=== Roadways ===
Chhapra is served by several National Highways, including the under-construction NH 19 (Chhapra–Hajipur Highway), which is being developed as a four-lane highway. Other National Highways passing through or connecting to Chhapra in the Saran district include NH 85, NH 101, NH 102 and NH 331. Additionally, NH 722 (Chhapra-Muzaffarpur) is also being upgraded to a four-lane highway.

Key National Highways

- NH 19: The Chhapra-Hajipur Highway spans 66.74 km as a four-lane road and forms part of the old NH 19.
- NH 331: This highway runs from Chhapra to Mohammadpur, passing through major destinations such as Jalalpur, Baniapur, and Sahajitpur.
- NH 722: The Chhapra-Muzaffarpur section of this highway is currently being upgraded to a four-lane road, enhancing connectivity and road conditions.
- Other Highways: The Saran district, where Chhapra is located, is also connected by several other National Highways, including NH 85, NH 101, and NH 102.

=== Chhapra Double Decker Flyover ===
Chhapra Double Decker Flyover is a two-tier elevated road under construction in Chhapra, Saran district, Bihar, India. The project aims to ease traffic congestion in the city by separating through-traffic from local movement across major intersections.

The flyover has a total length of about 3.5 kilometres, extending from Bhikhari Thakur Chowk to the Bus Stand, covering key points such as Gandhi Chowk, Katahari Bagh, Salempur Chowk, and Municipal Chowk. Each deck is around 5.5 metres wide, with a vertical clearance of approximately 7.5 metres between levels.

The project was launched in July 2018 at an initial cost of ₹411.32 crore, later revised to ₹696 crore under the Central Road Fund (CRF). Construction is being carried out by the Bihar State Bridge Construction Corporation Limited (BSBCCL).

Once completed, it will be one of the longest double-decker flyovers in North India.

=== Railways ===
Chhapra Junction is the major Railway Station of the Saran District lies on the North Eastern Railway zone. It is connected directly to all the major cities of India.

=== UP Coming Projects ===
- Fatehabad–Chanchaliya High-Level Bridge over the Gandak River

A new high-level, three-lane PSC box-girder bridge is being constructed across the Gandak River, connecting Fatehabad (Paru) in Muzaffarpur to Chanchaliya (Taraiya) in Saran. The project, estimated to cost around ₹589 crore, includes a high-level three-lane bridge measuring approximately 2,280 metres along with about 2,200 metres of approach roads. Once completed, the bridge will dramatically reduce the travel distance between Paru and Taraiya from nearly 49 km to just 10 km, significantly cutting travel time and fuel consumption. It is expected to boost local trade, ease movement between Muzaffarpur, Chhapra, and Siwan, and improve regional connectivity to Uttar Pradesh. Currently, land acquisition and survey activities are in progress following the government's approval of the project.

- Widening of NH-102 (Chhapra–Rewaghat–Muzaffarpur)

The entire NH-102 stretch from Chhapra to Rewaghat and Muzaffarpur is being upgraded to a two-lane highway with paved shoulders, improving regional road quality and safety.

- Four-Laning of NH-85 and NH-102 (Gopalganj–Siwan–Chhapra–Muzaffarpur)

The Central Government has initiated the process to develop a combined 169-km corridor into a four-lane highway.

1. NH-85 (Gopalganj–Siwan–Chhapra): 95 km
2. NH-102 (Chhapra–Muzaffarpur): 74 km

== Notable people ==
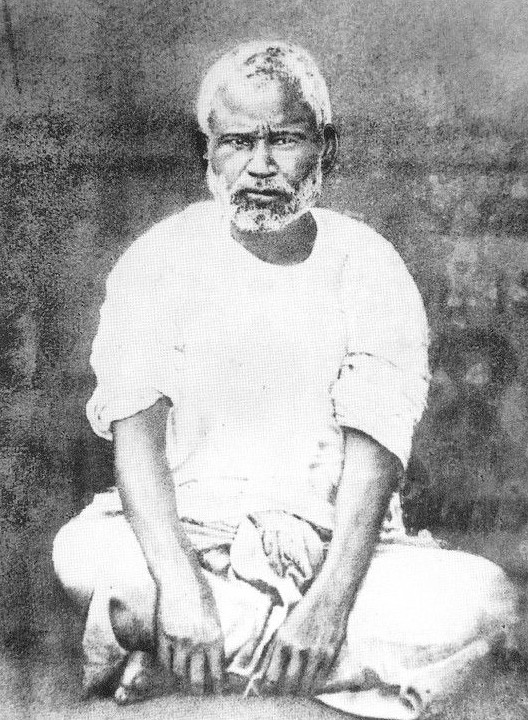
Adbhutananda

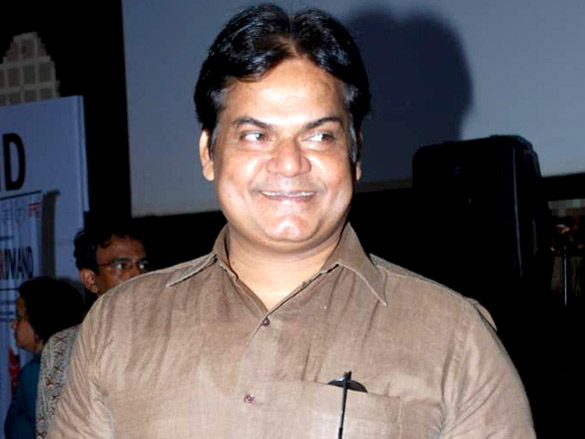
Akhilendra Mishra

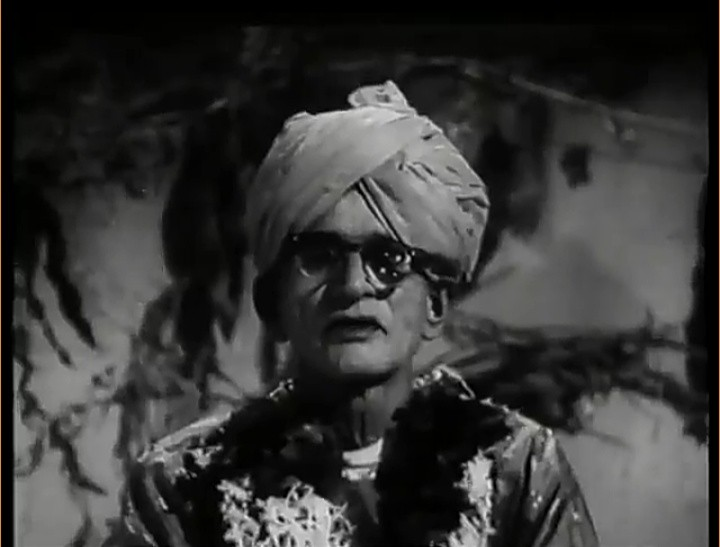
Bhikhari Thakur

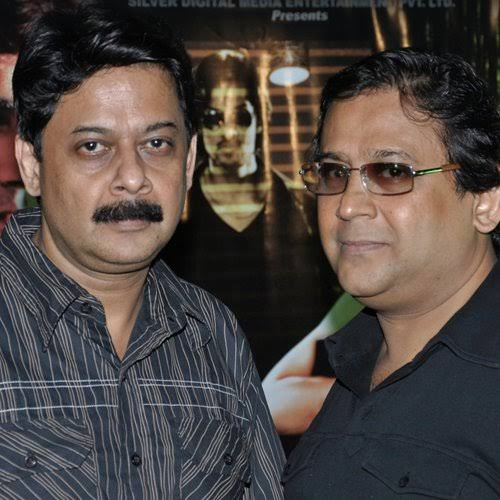
Anand–Milind

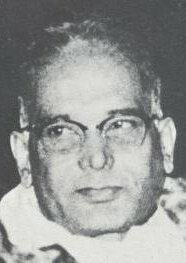
Jayaprakash Narayan

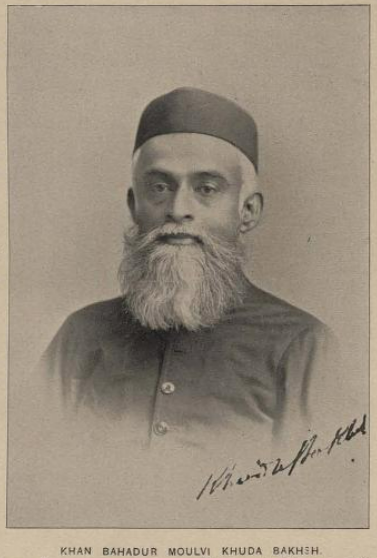
Khuda Bakhsh

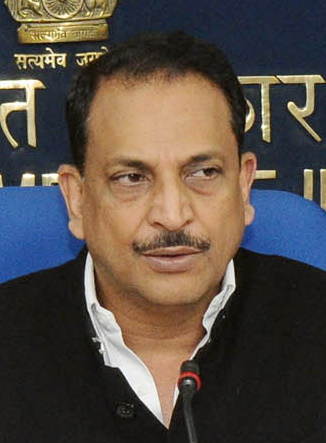
Rajiv Pratap Rudy
- Adbhutananda, Hindu monk, disciple of Ramakrishna
- Akhilendra Mishra, Bollywood actor
- Anand–Milind, music director
- Bhikhari Thakur, Bhojpuri language poet and singer
- Brajkishore Prasad, national activist
- Chitragupta (composer), music director
- Daroga Prasad Rai, 10th Chief Minister of Bihar
- Jayaprakash Narayan, Indian independence activist
- Khuda Bakhsh 1842–1908, Indian lawyer, judge, historian and founder of Khuda Bakhsh Oriental Library, Patna
- Mahendar Misir, Bhojpuri poet
- Raghuveer Narayan, Bhojpuri poet
- Rajiv Pratap Rudy, Minister of State (Independent Charge) Skill Development and Entrepreneurship
- Ramchandra Manjhi, Bhojpuri folk dancer
- Surur Hoda, Socialist leader and Order of British Empire (OBE) recipient
- Prabhunath Singh, 4 times Member of Parliament and 2 times MLA
- Janardan Singh Sigriwal, 3 times Member of Parliament and 2 times MLA
- Acharya Sarangdhar, teacher and writer
- King Babu Ganesh Singh ji, King of Bhatkeshri Estate
- King Babu Harsahay Mahto, Father of King Babu Ganesh Singh ji, Bhatkeshri Estate
- Babu Chhathu Singh Koiri, Son of King Babu Ganesh Singh ji, Bhatkeshri Estate
